= List of PlayStation (console) games (M–Z) =

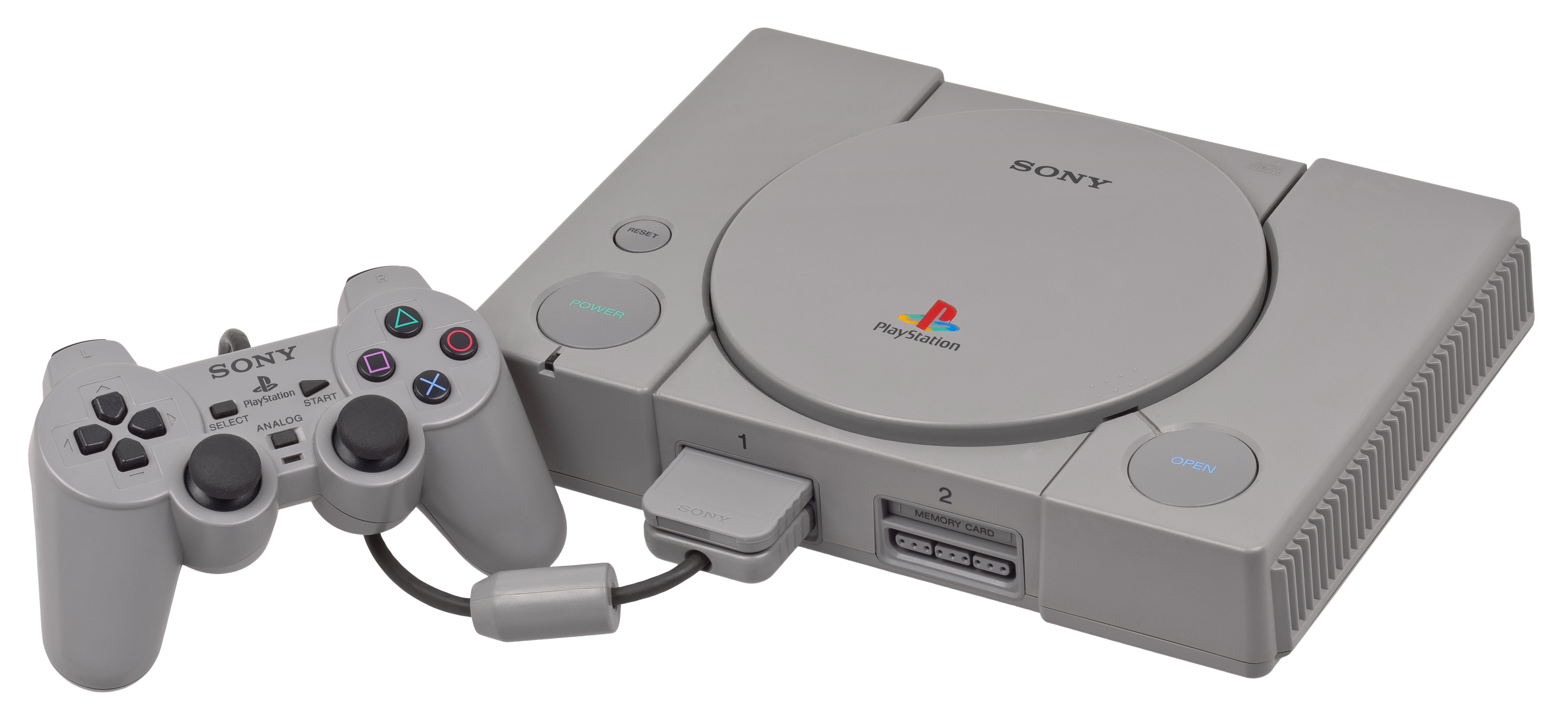
The Sony PlayStation console.

This is a continued list of games for the Sony PlayStation video game system, organized alphabetically by name. There are often different names for the same game in different regions.

== Games list (M–Z) ==
There are currently 4053 (Note: This number is always up to date by this script.) games across both this page (M to Z) and the remainder of the list from A to L.

For a chronological list, click the sort button in any of the available region's column. Games dated December 3, 1994 (JP), September 9, 1995 (NA), September 29, 1995 (EU), and November 15, 1995 (AU) are launch titles of each region respectively.

Key
| P Essentials (PlayStation) (Platinum) | PS2 Also on PS2 |

| Title | Developer(s) | Publisher(s) | Regions released | | | Options | Ref. |
| Title | Developer(s) | Publisher(s) | Japan | Europe/PAL | North America | Options | Ref. |
|---|---|---|---|---|---|---|---|
| M&M's Shell Shocked | Boston Animation | Simon & Schuster Interactive^{NA}, JoWooD Productions^{PAL} | Unreleased | July 20, 2003 | September 28, 2001 | | |
| m: Kimi o Tsutaete | Nexus Interact | Nexus Interact | December 20, 1996 | Unreleased | Unreleased | | |
| Maboroshi Tsukiyo | SIMS | Kaga Tech | April 6, 2000 | Unreleased | Unreleased | | |
| Machine Head •Blam! Machinehead^{PAL} | Core Design | Eidos Interactive | May 23, 1997 | October 1996 | November 15, 1996 | | |
| Machine Hunter | Eurocom | MGM Interactive | Unreleased | Unreleased | August 31, 1997 | | |
| Macross Digital Mission VF-X | UNiT Inc. | Bandai Visual | February 28, 1997 | Unreleased | Unreleased | | |
| Macross: Do You Remember Love? | Scarab | Bandai | May 27, 1999 | Unreleased | Unreleased | | |
| Macross Plus: Game Edition | Shoeisha | Takara | June 29, 2000 | Unreleased | Unreleased | | |
| Macross VF-X 2 | UNiT Inc. | Bandai | September 2, 1999 | Unreleased | Unreleased | | |
| Mad Panic Coaster | Hakuhodo | Hakuhodo | November 3, 1997 | Unreleased | Unreleased | | |
| Mad Stalker: Full Metal Force | Fill-in-Cafe | Family Soft | July 3, 1997 | Unreleased | Unreleased | | |
| Madden NFL 97 | EA Tiburon | EA Sports | Unreleased | 1996 | August 15, 1996 | | |
| Madden NFL 98 | EA Tiburon | EA Sports | Unreleased | 1997 | August 26, 1997 | | |
| Madden NFL 99 | EA Tiburon | EA Sports | Unreleased | 1998 | August 1, 1998 | | |
| Madden NFL 2000 | EA Tiburon | EA Sports | Unreleased | 1999 | August 31, 1999 | | |
| Madden NFL 2001 | EA Tiburon | EA Sports | Unreleased | 2000 | August 22, 2000 | | |
| Madden NFL 2002 | EA Tiburon, Budcat Creations | EA Sports | Unreleased | Unreleased | August 15, 2001 | | |
| Madden NFL 2003 | EA Tiburon, Budcat Creations | EA Sports | Unreleased | Unreleased | August 13, 2002 | | |
| Madden NFL 2004 | EA Tiburon, Budcat Creations | EA Sports | Unreleased | Unreleased | August 12, 2003 | | |
| Madden NFL 2005 | EA Tiburon, Budcat Creations | EA Sports | Unreleased | Unreleased | September 14, 2004 | | |
| The Maestromusic | Global A | Global A | July 27, 2000 | Unreleased | Unreleased | | |
| The Maestromusic: Encore (Note: expansion for The Maestromusic.) | Global A | Global A | November 22, 2000 | Unreleased | Unreleased | | |
| The Maestromusic: Christmas Edition (Note: expansion for The Maestromusic.) (Note: Contains mini-games.) | Global A | Global A | December 7, 2000 | Unreleased | Unreleased | | |
| Magic Carpet | Krisalis Software | Electronic Arts | February 14, 1997 | March 15, 1996 | March 15, 1996 | | |
| Magic: The Gathering: BattleMage | Realtime Associates | Acclaim Entertainmentm | Unreleased | Unreleased | September 15, 1997 | | |
| Magical Date: Doki Doki Kokuhaku Daisakusen | Taito | Taito | November 20, 1997 | Unreleased | Unreleased | | |
| Magical Dice Kids | SCEI | SCEI | August 3, 2000 | Unreleased | Unreleased | | |
| Magical Drop | Data East | Data East | January 13, 1996 | Unreleased | Unreleased | | |
| Magical Drop III •Magical Drop III + Wonderful!^{JP} | Data East | ^{JP}Data East, ^{PAL}Swing! Entertainment | February 25, 1999 | July 23, 2000 | Unreleased | | |
| Magical Drop III: Yokubari Tokudaigou! | Data East | Data East | October 30, 1997 | Unreleased | Unreleased | | |
| Magical Drop F - Daibouken Mo Rakujyanai! | Data East, SAS Sakata | Data East | October 21, 1999 | Unreleased | Unreleased | | |
| Magical Medical | Konami | Konami | September 10, 1998 | Unreleased | Unreleased | | |
| Magical Music Eigo de One - Two - Three! | | Bandai | September 21, 2000 | Unreleased | Unreleased | | |
| Magical Tetris Challenge •Magical Tetris Challenge featuring Mickey^{JP} | Capcom | Capcom^{JP/NA}, Sony Computer Entertainment^{PAL} | March 18, 1999 | March 18, 1999 | Unreleased | | |
| Magical Zunou Power!! Party Selection | Pixel | Vap | March 19, 1998 | Unreleased | Unreleased | | |
| Mahjong (Family 1500 Series) | Magnolia | I'Max | November 21, 2002 | Unreleased | Unreleased | | |
| Mahjong (Hyper Value 2800)) | Konami | Konami | January 13, 2000 | Unreleased | Unreleased | | |
| Mahjong (Selen) | ProSoft | Selen | July 12, 2001 | Unreleased | Unreleased | | |
| Mahjong Club | Natsu System | Hect | April 9, 1998 | Unreleased | Unreleased | | |
| Mahjong de Asobo | Vap | Vap | November 30, 2000 | Unreleased | Unreleased | | |
| Mahjong de Pon! Hanafuda de Koi! Our Graduation | Kid | Kid | February 3, 2000 | Unreleased | Unreleased | | |
| Mahjong Ganryuujima | Cosmos Computer | ASCII Entertainment | July 7, 1995 | Unreleased | Unreleased | | |
| Mahjong Gokuu Tenjiku | Chat Noir | Electronic Arts Victor | December 3, 1994 | Unreleased | Unreleased | | |
| Mahjong Gokuu Tenjiku 99 (Note: update for Mahjong Gokuu Tenjiku.) | Chat Noir | Chat Noir | June 3, 1999 | Unreleased | Unreleased | | |
| Mahjong II | Mediarium | Success | July 22, 1999 | Unreleased | Unreleased | | |
| Mahjong Senjutsu: Andou Mitsuru Pro no Akuukan Satsuhou | Mediarium | Success | June 14, 1996 | Unreleased | Unreleased | | |
| Mahjong Station Mazin | Chat Noir | Chat Noir | December 3, 1994 | Unreleased | Unreleased | | |
| Mahjong Taikai II Special | Koei | Koei | November 29, 1996 | Unreleased | Unreleased | | |
| Mahjong Uranai Fortuna: Tsuki no Megami-tachi | Affect | Affect | January 1, 2002 | Unreleased | Unreleased | | |
| Mahjong Yarouze! | Konami | Konami | April 28, 1999 | Unreleased | Unreleased | | |
| Mahjong Youchien: Tamago Gumi | Affect | Affect | March 12, 1998 | Unreleased | Unreleased | | |
| Mahjong Youchien: Tamago Gumi 2 | Affect | Affect | September 28, 2000 | Unreleased | Unreleased | | |
| Mahou Shoujo Fancy Coco | Pow | Planning Office Wada | September 13, 1996 | Unreleased | Unreleased | | |
| Mahou Shoujo Pretty Sammy Part 1: In The Earth | Pioneer LDC | Pioneer LDC | December 20, 1996 | Unreleased | Unreleased | | |
| Mahou Shoujo Pretty Sammy Part 2: In the Julyhelm | Pioneer LDC | Pioneer LDC | March 14, 1997 | Unreleased | Unreleased | | |
| Mahoutsukai ni Naru Houhou | TGL | TGL | February 18, 1999 | Unreleased | Unreleased | | |
| Mainichi Neko Youbi | Affect | Bandai | September 3, 1998 | Unreleased | Unreleased | | |
| Majokko Daisakusen: Little Witching Mischiefs | Toys for Bob | Bandai | February 4, 1999 | Unreleased | Unreleased | | |
| Makeruna! Makendō 2 | Fill-in-Cafe | Datam Polystar | November 10, 1995 | Unreleased | Unreleased | | |
| Makikou: Mystery Adventure | Success | Success | May 24, 2001 | Unreleased | Unreleased | | |
| Manic Game Girl | Joycast Entertainment | Joycast Entertainment | This game was released exclusively in South Korea (2002) | | | | |
| Marble Master •Swing^{PAL} | Software 2000 | Conspiracy Entertainment | Unreleased | 2002 | July 10, 2002 | | |
| Marby Baby Story | Ponos | Ponos | February 18, 1999 | Unreleased | Unreleased | | |
| Maria: Kimitachi ga Umareta Wake | Break | Axela | December 11, 1997 | Unreleased | Unreleased | | |
| Maria 2: Jutai Kokuchi no Nazo | Break | Axela | August 5, 1999 | Unreleased | Unreleased | | |
| Marie no Atelier: Salburg no Renkinjutsushi | Gust | Gust | May 23, 1997 | Unreleased | Unreleased | | |
| Marie no Atelier Plus - Salburg no Renkinjutsushi (Note: update for Marie no Atelier: Salburg no Renkinjutsushi.) (Note: Contains mini-games.) | Gust | Gust | June 4, 1998 | Unreleased | Unreleased | | |
| Mario Mushano no Chou-Shogi-Juku | King Records | King Records | October 23, 1997 | Unreleased | Unreleased | | |
| Marionette Company | Micro Cabin | Micro Cabin | May 20, 1999 | Unreleased | Unreleased | | |
| Marionette Company 2 Chu! | Micro Cabin | Micro Cabin | May 18, 2000 | Unreleased | Unreleased | | |
| Marl Jong!! | Nippon Ichi Software | Nippon Ichi Software | April 24, 2003 | Unreleased | Unreleased | | |
| Mars Moose Cosmic Quest 1: City Sights | Lightspan | Lightspan | Unreleased | Unreleased | 1998 | | |
| Mars Moose Cosmic Quest 2: Fairy Tale Island | Lightspan | Lightspan | Unreleased | Unreleased | 1998 | | |
| Mars Moose Cosmic Quest 3: Race Through France | Lightspan | Lightspan | Unreleased | Unreleased | 1998 | | |
| Mars Moose Stay & Play 1: In the Clubhouse | Lightspan | Lightspan | Unreleased | Unreleased | 1998 | | |
| Mars Moose Stay & Play 2: In Mars' Bedroom | Lightspan | Lightspan | Unreleased | Unreleased | 1998 | | |
| Mars Moose Stay & Play 3: In Lonnie's Classroom | Lightspan | Lightspan | Unreleased | Unreleased | 1998 | | |
| Mars Moose Walkabout 1: The Natural History Museum | Lightspan | Lightspan | Unreleased | Unreleased | 1998 | | |
| Mars Moose Walkabout 2: The Shakespeare Festival | Lightspan | Lightspan | Unreleased | Unreleased | 1998 | | |
| Mars Moose Walkabout 3: World Sports Day | Lightspan | Lightspan | Unreleased | Unreleased | 1998 | | |
| Martial Beat | Konami | Konami | February 7, 2002 | Unreleased | Unreleased | | |
| Martial Beat 2 | Konami | Konami | September 12, 2002 | Unreleased | Unreleased | | |
| Martian Gothic: Unification | Coyote Developments | Take-Two Interactive | Unreleased | October 5, 2001 | November 2, 2001 | | |
| Marvel Super Heroes | Capcom | Capcom^{JP/NA}, Virgin Interactive Entertainment^{PAL} | September 25, 1997 | December 1997 | September 25, 1997 | | |
| Marvel Super Heroes vs. Street Fighter | Capcom | Capcom^{NA/EU}, Virgin Interactive Entertainment^{PAL} | February 25, 1999 | May 1999 | February 25, 1999 | | |
| Marvel vs. Capcom: Clash of Super Heroes | Capcom | Capcom^{JP/NA}, Virgin Interactive Entertainment^{PAL} | November 11, 1999 | January 30, 2000 | January 31, 2000 | | |
| Mary-Kate and Ashley: Crush Course | n-Space | Acclaim Entertainment | Unreleased | 2001 | October 31, 2001 | | |
| Mary-Kate and Ashley: Magical Mystery Mall | n-Space | Acclaim Entertainment | Unreleased | 2000 | October 15, 2000 | | |
| Mary-Kate and Ashley: Winner's Circle | Tantalus Software | Acclaim Entertainment | Unreleased | May 25, 2001 | March 1, 2001 | | |
| Mary King's Riding Star | Midas | Midas | Unreleased | December 10, 1999 | Unreleased | | |
| Mass Destruction | NMS Software | ASC Games^{NA}, BMG Interactive^{PAL} | Unreleased | November 1997 | September 30, 1997 | | |
| Master of Monsters: Disciples of Gaia | SystemSoft | ASCII Entertainment | Unreleased | Unreleased | October 13, 1998 | | |
| The Master's Fighter | Shinemasa Play | Shinemasa Play | November 20, 1997 | Unreleased | Unreleased | | |
| Masters: Shin Harukanaru Augusta | T&E Soft | Soft Bank | July 12, 1996 | Unreleased | Unreleased | | |
| Masumon Kids: The Another World of The Master of Monsters | SystemSoft | Toshiba EMI | June 25, 1998 | Unreleased | Unreleased | | |
| The Match Golf | Marble | Zoom-X | January 22, 1998 | Unreleased | Unreleased | | |
| Mat Hoffman's Pro BMX | Runecraft | Activision | September 5, 2002 | May 25, 2001 | May 16, 2001 | | |
| Matsukata Hiroki no World Fishing | Tose | Bullet-Proof Software | January 19, 1996 | Unreleased | Unreleased | | |
| Matsumoto Reiji 999: Story of Galaxy Express 999 | Polygon Magic | Banpresto | June 28, 2001 | Unreleased | Unreleased | | |
| Max Surfing 2nd | KSS | KSS | September 21, 2000 | Unreleased | Unreleased | | |
| Maximum Force | Tantalus Interactive | Midway | Unreleased | Unreleased | September 30, 1997 | | |
| MaxRacer | PD | PD | April 18, 1997 | Unreleased | Unreleased | | |
| Mawatte Mucho! | Tohoku Shinsha | Tohoku Shinsha | June 25, 1998 | Unreleased | Unreleased | | |
| Maze Heroes: Meikyuu Densetsu | Media Entertainment | Media Entertainment | November 28, 2002 | Unreleased | Unreleased | | |
| MDK | Neversoft | Playmates Interactive Entertainment^{NA}, Shiny Entertainment^{PAL} | August 5, 1999 | November 1997 | November 10, 1997 | | |
| MechWarrior 2 | Quantum Factory | Activision | Unreleased | April 11, 1997 | March 28, 1997 | | |
| Medal of Honor | DreamWorks Interactive | Electronic Arts | Unreleased | 1999 | October 31, 1999 | P | |
| Medal of Honor: Underground | DreamWorks Interactive | Electronic Arts | Unreleased | December 1, 2000 | October 27, 2000 | P | |
| Medarot R | Natsume Co., Ltd. | Imagineer | November 25, 1999 | Unreleased | Unreleased | | |
| MediEvil | Sony Computer Entertainment | Sony Computer Entertainment | June 17, 1999 | October 1, 1998 | October 21, 1998 | P | |
| MediEvil 2 | Sony Computer Entertainment | Sony Computer Entertainment | Unreleased | April 19, 2000 | May 15, 2000 | P | |
| Medarot R: Parts Collection (Note: stand-alone expansion for Medarot R.) (Note: Includes playable Ranking Battles to earn parts and points, and the Pocket Robottle game for the PocketStation.) | Natsume Co., Ltd. | Imagineer | March 16, 2000 | Unreleased | Unreleased | | |
| Mega Man 8 •Rockman 8^{JP} | Capcom | Capcom^{JP/NA}, Infogrames^{PAL} | December 17, 1996 | February 27, 1997 | February 28, 1997 | | |
| Mega Man: Battle & Chase | Capcom | Capcom^{JP}, Infogrames^{PAL} | March 20, 1997 | November 30, 1998 | Unreleased | | |
| Mega Man Legends •Rockman DASH^{JP} | Capcom | Capcom^{JP/NA}, Virgin Interactive Entertainment^{PAL} | December 18, 1997 | December 4, 1998 | July 14, 1998 | | |
| Mega Man Legends 2 •Rockman DASH 2^{JP} | Capcom | Capcom | April 20, 2000 | August 3, 2001 | April 26, 2000 | | |
| Mega Man X3 | Capcom | Capcom^{JP}, Virgin Interactive Entertainment^{PAL} | April 26, 1996 | March 1997 | Unreleased | | |
| Mega Man X4 •Rockman X4^{JP} | Capcom | Capcom^{JP/NA}, Virgin Interactive Entertainment^{PAL} | August 1, 1997 | October 13, 1997 | July 15, 1997 | | |
| Mega Man X5 •Rockman X5^{JP} | Capcom | Capcom | November 30, 2000 | August 3, 2001 | February 3, 2001 | | |
| Mega Man X6 •Rockman X6^{JP} | Capcom | Capcom | November 29, 2001 | February 8, 2002 | December 7, 2001 | | |
| Megatudo 2096 | General Support | Banpresto | October 18, 1996 | Unreleased | Unreleased | | |
| Meguri Aishite | Sony Music Entertainment Japan | Sony Music Entertainment Japan | February 25, 1999 | Unreleased | Unreleased | | |
| Meitantei Conan | Jorudan | Bandai | November 19, 1998 | Unreleased | Unreleased | | |
| Meitantei Conan: 3-Jin no Meitantei | KID | Bandai | August 10, 2000 | Unreleased | Unreleased | | |
| Meitantei Conan: The Board Game | | Bandai | August 29, 2002 | Unreleased | Unreleased | | |
| Meitantei Conan: Saikou no Aibou | KID | Bandai | April 25, 2002 | Unreleased | Unreleased | | |
| Meitantei Conan: Trick Trick Vol. 1 | Kamui | Bandai | April 17, 2003 | Unreleased | Unreleased | | |
| Melty Lancer: Ginga Shoujo Keisatsu 2086 | Tenky | Imagineer | March 22, 1996 | Unreleased | Unreleased | | |
| Melty Lancer: Re-inforce | Tenky | Imagineer | December 4, 1997 | Unreleased | Unreleased | | |
| Melty Lancer: The 3rd Planet | Tenky | Konami | June 17, 1999 | Unreleased | Unreleased | | |
| Memorial * Series: Sunsoft Vol. 1: Ikki / Super Arabian | SunSoft | SunSoft | November 4, 2001 | Unreleased | Unreleased | | |
| Memorial * Series: Sunsoft Vol. 2: Route-16 Turbo / Atlantis no Nazo | SunSoft | SunSoft | December 6, 2001 | Unreleased | Unreleased | | |
| Memorial * Series: Sunsoft Vol. 3: Madoola no Tsubasa / Toukaidou Gojuusan Tsugi | SunSoft | SunSoft | December 27, 2001 | Unreleased | Unreleased | | |
| Memorial * Series: Sunsoft Vol. 4: Chou Wakusei Senki Metafight / Ripple Island | SunSoft | SunSoft | February 14, 2002 | Unreleased | Unreleased | | |
| Memorial * Series: Sunsoft Vol. 5: Raf World / Hebereke | SunSoft | SunSoft | March 28, 2002 | Unreleased | Unreleased | | |
| Memorial * Series: Sunsoft Vol. 6: Battle Formula / Gimmick! | SunSoft | SunSoft | November 21, 2002 | Unreleased | Unreleased | | |
| Memories Off | Kid | Kid | September 30, 1999 | Unreleased | Unreleased | | |
| Memories Off 2nd | Kid | Kid | September 27, 2001 | Unreleased | Unreleased | | |
| Men in Black: The Game | Gigawatt Studios | Gremlin Interactive | Unreleased | April 4, 1998 | Unreleased | | |
| Men in Black: The Series – Crashdown | Runecraft | Infogrames | Unreleased | November 2, 2001 | November 1, 2001 | | |
| Menkyo o Torou | Twilight Express | Twilight Express | May 25, 2000 | Unreleased | Unreleased | | |
| Meremanoid | Xing Entertainment | Xing Entertainment | August 5, 1999 | Unreleased | Unreleased | | |
| Mermaid no Kisetsu | Game Village | NetVillage | December 13, 2001 | Unreleased | Unreleased | | |
| Mermaid no Kisetsu: Curtain Call (Note: stand-alone expansion for Mermaid no Kisetsu.) (Note: Contains quiz mini-games.) | Game Village | NetVillage | August 1, 2002 | Unreleased | Unreleased | | |
| Merriment Carrying Caravan | Tenky | Imagineer | August 6, 1998 | Unreleased | Unreleased | | |
| Meru Purana | Gust | Gust | June 21, 1996 | Unreleased | Unreleased | | |
| Meta-Ph-List: Gamma X 2097 | ADM | ADM | January 31, 1997 | Unreleased | Unreleased | | |
| Metal Angel 3 | Victor Interactive Software | Victor Interactive Software | June 13, 1997 | Unreleased | Unreleased | | |
| Metal Gear Solid | Konami | Konami | September 3, 1998 | February 22, 1999 | October 21, 1998 | P | |
| Metal Gear Solid: Integral (Note: update for Metal Gear Solid.) | Konami | Konami | June 24, 1999 | Unreleased | Unreleased | | |
| Metal Gear Solid: VR Missions (Note: expansion for Metal Gear Solid. The North American edition runs independently; the PAL edition requires the original game discs.), Metal Gear Solid: Special Missions^{PAL} | Konami | Konami | Unreleased | October 29, 1999 | October 12, 1999 | | |
| Metal Jacket | Team Tornado | Pony Canyon | September 22, 1995 | Unreleased | Unreleased | | |
| Metal Slug | Nazca Corporation | SNK | August 7, 1997 | Unreleased | Unreleased | | |
| Metal Slug X | ProSoft | SNK^{JP}, Agetec^{NA}, Virgin Interactive Entertainment^{PAL} | January 25, 2001 | 2000^{AU} August 1, 2003 | April 14, 2001 | | |
| Metamoru Panic: Doki Doki Youma Busters!! | Fill-In Cafe | Family Soft | December 22, 1995 | Unreleased | Unreleased | | |
| Mezase! Airline Pilot | Twilight Express | Twilight Express | August 5, 1999 | Unreleased | Unreleased | | |
| Mezase! Meimon Yakyubu | Dazz | Dazz | March 18, 1999 | Unreleased | Unreleased | | |
| Mezase! Senkyuu Ou | Seibu Kaihatsu | Seibu Kaihatsu | April 19, 1996 | Unreleased | Unreleased | | |
| Michael Owen's WLS 99 | Silicon Dreams Studio | Eidos Interactive | Unreleased | 1998 | Unreleased | | |
| Michael Schumacher Racing World Kart 2002 | Radon Labs | JoWooD Productions | Unreleased | September 18, 2002 | Unreleased | | |
| Michelin Rally Masters: Race of Champions | Digital Illusions | Infogrames | Unreleased | 2000 | October 15, 2000 | | |
| Michinoku Hitou Koimonogatari Kai (Note: update for Bishoujo Hanafuda Kikou: Michinoku Hitou Koimonogatari.) | Fog | Fog | December 22, 1999 | Unreleased | Unreleased | | |
| Mickey's Wild Adventure | Phygnosis | Sony Computer Entertainment | Unreleased | March 1, 1996 | Unreleased | P | |
| Mickey to Nakamatachi - Kazuasobi IroIro | Atlus | Atlus | November 15, 2001 | Unreleased | Unreleased | | |
| Micro Machines V3 | Codemasters | Midway | January 1, 1998 | March 1997 | December 15, 1997 | P | |
| Midnight Run: Road Fighter 2 | Konami Computer Entertainment Aoyama | Konami | November 27, 1997 | January 1998 | Unreleased | | |
| Midori no Makibao: Kuroi Inazuma Shiroi Kiseki | Axela | Axela | March 19, 1998 | Unreleased | Unreleased | | |
| Mighty Hits | Altron | Altron | December 27, 1996 | Unreleased | Unreleased | | |
| Mighty Hits Special^{PAL}, Mighty Hits Special (Pop Collection 1280 Vol. 4)^{JP} (Note: update for Mighty Hits.) (Note: Contains shooting mini-games.) | Altron | Altron | July 15, 1999 | 1999 | Unreleased | | |
| Mikagura Shōjo Tanteidan | Human Entertainment | Human Entertainment | September 17, 1998 | Unreleased | Unreleased | | |
| Mike Tyson Boxing •Prince Naseem Boxing^{PAL} | Codemasters | Codemasters | Unreleased | November 3, 2000 | October 31, 2000 | | |
| Milky Season | KID | KID | February 28, 2002 | Unreleased | Unreleased | | |
| Mille Miglia | Kung Fu Games | SCi | Unreleased | October 13, 2000 | Unreleased | | |
| Million Classic | Cepia | Bandai | March 18, 1999 | Unreleased | Unreleased | | |
| Minakata Hakudou Toujou | Thinking Rabbit | Atlus | August 7, 1997 | Unreleased | Unreleased | | |
| MiniMoni: Dice de Pyon! | Konami | Konami | March 20, 2002 | Unreleased | Unreleased | | |
| MiniMoni ni Naru no da Pyon! | | Bandai | September 26, 2002 | Unreleased | Unreleased | | |
| MiniMoni: Shaka tto Tambourine! Dapyon! | Sega | Sega | September 19, 2002 | Unreleased | Unreleased | | |
| MiniMoni: Step Up Pyon Pyon Pyon | Konami | Konami | December 12, 2002 | Unreleased | Unreleased | | |
| Minna Atsumare! Igo Kyoushitsu | SilverStar | I.Magic | December 11, 2003 | Unreleased | Unreleased | | |
| Minna no Igo | Sunsoft | SunSoft | October 25, 2001 | Unreleased | Unreleased | | |
| Minna no Kanji Kyoushitsu: Chousen!! Kanji Kentei •Kanji Quiz: Kanji Kentei ni Challenge^{JP} | Dyna Corporation | Dyna Corporation | April 26, 2001 | Unreleased | Unreleased | | |
| Minna no Mahjong | Success | Success | May 31, 2001 | Unreleased | Unreleased | | |
| Minna no Othello | Success | Success | February 28, 2002 | Unreleased | Unreleased | | |
| Minna no Shiiku Kyoushitsu: Kuwagata-hen | Dyna Corporation | Dyna Corporation | September 6, 2001 | Unreleased | Unreleased | | |
| Minna no Shogi: Chuukyuuhen | Success | Success | March 7, 2002 | Unreleased | Unreleased | | |
| Minna no Shogi: Jokyuuhen | Success | Success | March 7, 2002 | Unreleased | Unreleased | | |
| Minna no Shogi: Shokyuuhen | Success | Success | March 7, 2002 | Unreleased | Unreleased | | |
| Minnya de Ghost Hunter | E3 Staff | E3 Staff | December 5, 2002 | Unreleased | Unreleased | | |
| Minton Keibu no Sousa File: Doukeshi Satsujin Jiken | Thinking Rabbit | Riverhillsoft | December 4, 1997 | Unreleased | Unreleased | | |
| Miracle Jim no Bassing Beat | E3 Staff | Hearty Robin | February 11, 1998 | Unreleased | Unreleased | | |
| Miracle Space Race | Miracle Designs | Mud Duck Productions^{NA}, Midas Interactive Entertainment^{EU} | Unreleased | 2003 | May 15, 2003 | | |
| Miracle World: Fushigi no Kuni no IQ Meiro | Wizard | Wizard | December 8, 1995 | Unreleased | Unreleased | | |
| Mirano no Arubaito Collection | West One | Victor Interactive Software | July 1, 1999 | Unreleased | Unreleased | | |
| Misa no Mahou Monogatari | Sammy Studios | Sammy Studios | February 26, 1998 | Unreleased | Unreleased | | |
| Misaki-Aggressive | Zero System | Shoeisha | July 23, 1998 | Unreleased | Unreleased | | |
| The Misadventures of Tron Bonne | Capcom | Capcom^{JP/NA}, Eidos Interactive^{EU} | July 22, 1999 | June 16, 2000 | April 30, 2000 | | |
| Miss Spider's Tea Party | Hypnotix | Simon & Schuster Interactive | Unreleased | Unreleased | November 1, 2000 | | |
| Missile Command | Meyer/Glass Interactive | Hasbro Interactive | Unreleased | Unreleased | November 16, 1999 | | |
| The Mission | Microids | Microids | Unreleased | December 22, 2000 | Unreleased | | |
| Mission: Impossible | X-Ample Architectures | Infogrames | Unreleased | Unreleased | November 13, 1999 | | |
| Missland | Altron | Altron | April 28, 1995 | Unreleased | Unreleased | | |
| Missland 2 | Altron | Altron | November 26, 1998 | Unreleased | Unreleased | | |
| Mitouhou e no Chousen: Alps-Hen | We Net | We Net | July 24, 1997 | Unreleased | Unreleased | | |
| Mitsumete Knight | Konami, Red Company | Konami | March 19, 1998 | Unreleased | Unreleased | | |
| Mitsumete Knight R Daibouken hen | Konami | Konami | November 26, 1998 | Unreleased | Unreleased | | |
| Mizuki Shigeru no Yokai Butouden | KSS | KSS | April 25, 1997 | Unreleased | Unreleased | | |
| Mizzurna Falls | Human Entertainment | Human Entertainment | December 23, 1998 | Unreleased | Unreleased | | |
| MLB '98 | Sony Computer Entertainment | Sony Computer Entertainment | Unreleased | Unreleased | July 10, 1997 | | |
| MLB '99 | Sony Computer Entertainment | Sony Computer Entertainment | Unreleased | Unreleased | April 1, 1998 | | |
| MLB 2000 | 989 Sports | 989 Sports | Unreleased | Unreleased | March 1, 1999 | | |
| MLB 2001 | 989 Sports | 989 Sports | Unreleased | Unreleased | March 29, 2000 | | |
| MLB 2002 | 989 Sports | Sony Computer Entertainment | Unreleased | Unreleased | May 8, 2001 | | |
| MLB 2003 | 989 Sports | Sony Computer Entertainment | Unreleased | Unreleased | June 19, 2002 | | |
| MLB 2004 | 989 Sports | Sony Computer Entertainment | Unreleased | Unreleased | April 29, 2003 | | |
| MLB 2005 | 989 Sports | Sony Computer Entertainment | Unreleased | Unreleased | March 4, 2004 | | |
| MLB Pennant Race | Sony Interactive Studios America | SCEA | Unreleased | Unreleased | September 30, 1996 | | |
| Mobil 1: Rally Championship | Magnetic Fields, Creative Asylum Limited | Actualize | Unreleased | 2000 | March 7, 2000 | | |
| Mobile Armor •Simple 1500 Series Vol. 90: The Sensha^{JP} | Highwaystar | Agetec Inc. | March 28, 2002 | Unreleased | October 24, 2002 | | |
| Mobile Light Force | Psikyo | XS Games | December 15, 1995 | 2002 | April 10, 2003 | | |
| Mobile Suit Gundam | Sunrise | Bandai | June 23, 1995 | Unreleased | Unreleased | | |
| Mobile Suit Gundam: Char's Counterattack | | Bandai | December 17, 1998 | Unreleased | Unreleased | | |
| Mobile Suit Gundam: Perfect One Year War | | Bandai | July 31, 1997 | Unreleased | Unreleased | | |
| Mobile Suit Z-Gundam | | Bandai | December 11, 1997 | Unreleased | Unreleased | | |
| Mobius Link 3D | I.Magic | Itochu | April 2, 1998 | Unreleased | Unreleased | | |
| Momotarou Densetsu | Make | Hudson Soft | December 23, 1998 | Unreleased | Unreleased | | |
| Momotarou Dentetsu 7 | Make | Hudson Soft | December 23, 1997 | Unreleased | Unreleased | | |
| Momotarou Dentetsu V | Make | Hudson Soft | December 16, 1999 | Unreleased | Unreleased | | |
| Momotarou Matsuri: Ishikawa Rokuemon no Maki | Make | Hudson Soft | September 13, 2001 | Unreleased | Unreleased | | |
| Mona & Moki: Drive Me Wild | Lightspan | Lightspan | Unreleased | Unreleased | 1998 | | |
| Mona & Moki: Drive Me Wilder | Lightspan | Lightspan | Unreleased | Unreleased | 1998 | | |
| Monaco Grand Prix Racing Simulation | Ubi Soft Paris | Ubi Soft | September 30, 1999 | July 1999 | July 15, 1999 | | |
| Money Idol Exchanger | Face | Affect | November 5, 1998 | Unreleased | Unreleased | | |
| Monkey Hero | Blam! | Take-Two Interactive | Unreleased | 1999 | February 28, 1999 | | |
| Monkey Magic | Mpen | Sunsoft | July 13, 2000 | Unreleased | November 27, 1999 | | |
| Monopoly | Gremlin Interactive | Hasbro Interactive | January 8, 1998 | 1997 | November 15, 1997 | P | |
| Monster * Race | Koei | Koei | December 17, 1998 | Unreleased | Unreleased | | |
| Monster Bass | Magical Company | XS Games | June 15, 2000 | Unreleased | December 15, 2002 | | |
| Monster Collection: Kamen no Madoushi | Kadokawa | ESP Software | October 28, 1999 | Unreleased | Unreleased | | |
| Monster Complete World | Idea Factory | Idea Factory | May 27, 1999 | Unreleased | Unreleased | | |
| Monster Punish | Siesta | Teichiku Records | December 16, 1999 | Unreleased | Unreleased | | |
| Monster Racer | Microids | Microids | Unreleased | 2001 | Unreleased | | |
| Monster Rancher | Tecmo | Tecmo | July 24, 1997 | Unreleased | November 30, 1997 | | |
| Monster Rancher 2 | Tecmo | Tecmo | February 25, 1999 | October 20, 2000 | September 3, 1999 | | |
| Monster Rancher Battle Card: Episode II | Tecmo | Tecmo | March 23, 2000 | Unreleased | August 2, 2000 | | |
| Monster Rancher Hop-A-Bout | Tecmo | Tecmo | March 22, 2001 | Unreleased | December 10, 2000 | | |
| Monster Seed | NK System | Sunsoft | November 5, 1998 | 1999 | April 5, 1999 | | |
| Monsters, Inc. Scream Team •Monsters, Inc. Scare Island^{PAL} •Monsters, Inc. Monster Academy^{JP} | Artificial Mind and Movement | Sony Computer Entertainment | March 14, 2002 | February 1, 2002 | October 30, 2001 | P | |
| Monte Carlo Games Compendium | Mere Mortals | Midas Interactive | Unreleased | March 28, 2002 | Unreleased | | |
| Moon: Remix RPG Adventure | Love-de-Lic | ASCII Entertainment | October 16, 1997 | Unreleased | Unreleased | | |
| Moonlight Syndrome | Human Entertainment | Human Entertainment | October 9, 1997 | Unreleased | Unreleased | | |
| Moorhen 3: Chicken Chase | Similis (game developer) | Ubi Soft | Unreleased | September 20, 2002 | Unreleased | | |
| Moorhuhn 2 | Similis (game developer) | Phenomedia | Unreleased | December 15, 2000 | Unreleased | | |
| Moorhuhn Kart | Sproing Interactive Media | Phenomedia | Unreleased | November 17, 2003 | Unreleased | | |
| Moorhuhn X | Sproing Interactive Media | Phenomedia | Unreleased | July 20, 2005^{DE} | Unreleased | | |
| Mori no Oukoku | Asmik Ace Entertainment, Inc | Asmik Ace Entertainment, Inc | October 12, 1999 | Unreleased | Unreleased | | |
| Morita Kazurou no Chess | Yuki | Yuki | December 16, 1999 | Unreleased | Unreleased | | |
| Morita Kazurou no Gomokunarabe to Renju | Yuki | Yuki | December 16, 1999 | Unreleased | Unreleased | | |
| Morita Kazurou no Hanafuda | Yuki | Yuki | December 16, 1999 | Unreleased | Unreleased | | |
| Morita Kazurou no Mahjong | Yuki | Yuki | February 17, 2000 | Unreleased | Unreleased | | |
| Morita Kazurou no Reversi | Yuki | Yuki | September 22, 1999 | Unreleased | Unreleased | | |
| Morita Kazurou no Shogi Dojo | Yuki | Yuki | September 22, 1999 | Unreleased | Unreleased | | |
| Morita Shogi | Random House | Seta Corporation | December 4, 1997 | Unreleased | Unreleased | | |
| Moritaka Chisato: Safari Tokyo | Oracion | Koei | October 22, 1998 | Unreleased | Unreleased | | |
| Mort the Chicken | AndNow Interactive | Crave Entertainment | Unreleased | Unreleased | November 3, 2000 | | |
| Mortal Kombat II | Probe Entertainment | Acclaim Japan | August 12, 1996 | Unreleased | Unreleased | | |
| Mortal Kombat 3 | Williams | Sony Computer Entertainment | June 14, 1996 | December 8, 1995 | October 7, 1995 | | |
| Mortal Kombat 4 | Eurocom | Midway Games | Unreleased | October 15, 1998 | June 24, 1998 | | |
| Mortal Kombat Mythologies: Sub-Zero | Avalanche Software | Midway Games | Unreleased | December 2, 1997 | October 10, 1997 | | |
| Mortal Kombat: Special Forces | Midway | Midway | Unreleased | September 29, 2000 | June 30, 2000 | | |
| Mortal Kombat Trilogy (Note: update for Mortal Kombat 3.) | Avalanche Software | Midway Games | April 2, 1998 | December 9, 1996 | October 1, 1996 | P | |
| Moses Prince Of Egypt | The Code Monkeys | Midas Interactive | Unreleased | September 1, 2000 | Unreleased | | |
| Moto Racer | Delphine Software International | Electronic Arts | Unreleased | Unreleased | October 15, 1997 | P | |
| Moto Racer 2 | Delphine Software International | Electronic Arts | Unreleased | Unreleased | November 10, 1998 | P | |
| Moto Racer World Tour | Delphine Software International | Sony Computer Entertainment^{EU}, Infogrames^{NA} | Unreleased | September 29, 2000 | November 7, 2000 | P | |
| Motocross Mania | Deibus Studios | Take-Two Interactive | Unreleased | Unreleased | June 20, 2001 | | |
| Motocross Mania 2 | Gotham Games | Gotham Games | Unreleased | July 4, 2003 | June 24, 2003 | | |
| Motor Toon Grand Prix | Sony Computer Entertainment | Sony Computer Entertainment | December 16, 1994 | Unreleased | Unreleased | | |
| Motor Toon Grand Prix 2 •Motor Toon Grand Prix^{NA} | Polyphony Digital | Sony Computer Entertainment | May 24, 1996 | November 15, 1996 | October 15, 1996 | | |
| Motorhead | Digital Illusions CE | Fox Interactive, Gremlin Interactive | Unreleased | April 1998 | November 11, 1998 | | |
| Motor Mash | Eutechnyx | Ocean Software | Unreleased | November 1997 | Unreleased | | |
| Motteke Tamago with Ganbare Kamonohashi | Naxat Soft | Naxat Soft | April 23, 1998 | Unreleased | Unreleased | | |
| Motto! Oja Majo Do-Re-Mi: Mahodou Smile Party | | Bandai | July 26, 2001 | Unreleased | Unreleased | | |
| Motto Trump Shiyouyo! i-Mode de Grand Prix | Pure Sound | Pure Sound | June 27, 2002 | Unreleased | Unreleased | | |
| Motto! Nyan to Wonderful 2 | Banpresto | Banpresto | February 11, 1999 | Unreleased | Unreleased | | |
| Mouja | Racdym | Virgin Interactive Entertainment | January 10, 1997 | Unreleased | Unreleased | | |
| Mouri Motonari: Chikai no Sanshi | Koei | Koei | February 26, 1998 | Unreleased | Unreleased | | |
| Mr. Driller | Namco | Namco^{JP}, Namco Hometek^{NA}, Sony Computer Entertainment^{EU} | June 29, 2000 | 2000 | October 5, 2000 | | |
| Mr. Driller G | Namco | Namco | November 22, 2001 | Unreleased | Unreleased | | |
| Mr. Prospector: Horiate-kun | Rythmics | ASK | August 19, 1999 | Unreleased | Unreleased | | |
| Ms. Pac-Man Maze Madness | Namco Hometek | Namco^{JP}, Namco Hometek^{NA}, Sony Computer Entertainment^{EU} | December 28, 2000 | October 17, 2000 | September 12, 2000 | | |
| MTB Dirt Cross | Sammy Studios | Sammy Studios | October 15, 1998 | Unreleased | Unreleased | | |
| MTV Sports: Pure Ride | Radical Entertainment | THQ | Unreleased | Unreleased | September 2, 2000 | | |
| MTV Sports: Skateboarding featuring Andy MacDonald | Darkblack | THQ | Unreleased | 2000 | September 16, 2000 | | |
| MTV Sports: Snowboarding | Radical Entertainment | THQ | Unreleased | Unreleased | October 25, 1999 | | |
| MTV Sports: T.J. Lavin's Ultimate BMX | Blue Shift | THQ | Unreleased | Unreleased | March 20, 2001 | | |
| The Mummy •Hamunaptra: Ushinawareta Sabaku no Miyako^{JP} | Rebellion Developments | Konami | Unreleased | Unreleased | November 30, 2000 | | |
| Munasawagi no Yokan: Yagami Hiroki no Game-Taste | Nippon Create | Kodansha | May 20, 1999 | Unreleased | Unreleased | | |
| Muppet Monster Adventure | Magenta Software | Sony Computer Entertainment^{EU}, Midway Games^{NA} | Unreleased | October 20, 2000 | November 8, 2000 | | |
| Muppet RaceMania | Traveller's Tales | Sony Computer Entertainment^{EU}, Midway Games^{NA} | Unreleased | April 19, 2000 | October 3, 2000 | | |
| Murakoshi Masami no Bakuchou Nippon Rettou •Murakoshi Masami no Bakuchou Nippon Rettou: TsuriCon Edition^{JP} | A-Wave | Victor Interactive Software | June 11, 1998 | Unreleased | Unreleased | | |
| Murakoshi Masami no Bakuchou Nippon Rettou 2 | A-Wave | Victor Interactive Software | September 14, 2000 | Unreleased | Unreleased | | |
| Murakoshi Masami no Pakuchikou Seabass Fishing | A-Wave | Victor Interactive Software | March 25, 1999 | Unreleased | Unreleased | | |
| The Murasaki Kinshiro | SunSoft | SunSoft | May 2, 2000 | Unreleased | Unreleased | | |
| Murder on the Eurasia Express | System Sacom | Enix Corporation | September 26, 1998 | Unreleased | Unreleased | | |
| Mushi no Idokoro | Gen Soft | Gen Soft | June 28, 1996 | Unreleased | Unreleased | | |
| Mushi Taro | Victor Interactive Software | Victor Interactive Software | July 6, 2000 | Unreleased | Unreleased | | |
| Muteki-ō Tri-Zenon | Marvelous Entertainment | Marvelous Entertainment | March 15, 2001 | Unreleased | Unreleased | | |
| My Disney Kitchen | Atlus | Atlus^{JP}, BAM! Entertainment^{NA} | February 7, 2002 | Unreleased | June 10, 2002 | | |
| My Dream: On Air ga Matenakute | Nippon Create | Nippon Create | September 18, 1997 | Unreleased | Unreleased | | |
| My Garden | TechnoSoft | TechnoSoft | September 2, 1999 | Unreleased | Unreleased | | |
| My Home Dream | Victor Interactive Software | Victor Interactive Software | December 2, 1999 | Unreleased | Unreleased | | |
| Myst | Cyan Worlds, Alfa System | Psygnosis, Soft Bank^{JP} | January 27, 1995 | November 15, 1996 | September 30, 1996 | | |
| Mystic Ark: Maboroshi Gekijo | Produce | Enix Corporation | March 18, 1999 | Unreleased | Unreleased | | |
| The Mystic Dragoons | Dual | Xing Entertainment | June 17, 1999 | Unreleased | Unreleased | | |
| Mystic Mind | Mycom | Mycom | September 3, 1998 | Unreleased | Unreleased | | |
| N2O: Nitrous Oxide | Gremlin Interactive | Gremlin Interactive^{EU}, Fox Interactive^{NA} | Unreleased | September 1998 | June 30, 1998 | | |
| Nagano Winter Olympics '98 | Konami | Konami | December 18, 1997 | February 1998 | January 15, 1998 | | |
| Nage Libre: Rasen no Soukoku | Varie | Varie | February 21, 1997 | Unreleased | Unreleased | | |
| Nainai no Meitantei | Tose | Namco | December 22, 1999 | Unreleased | Unreleased | | |
| Najavu no Daibouken: My Favorite Namjatown | Namco | Namco | October 13, 2000 | Unreleased | Unreleased | | |
| Namco Anthology 1 | Tose | Namco | June 4, 1998 | Unreleased | Unreleased | | |
| Namco Anthology 2 | Tose | Namco | September 23, 1998 | Unreleased | Unreleased | | |
| Namco Mahjong: Sparrow Garden | Namco | Namco | January 1, 1996 | Unreleased | Unreleased | | |
| Namco Museum Encore | Namco | Namco | October 30, 1997 | Unreleased | Unreleased | | |
| NAMCO Museum Vol. 1 | Namco | Namco^{JP}, Namco Hometek^{NA}, Sony Computer Entertainment^{EU} | November 22, 1995 | August 17, 1996 | June 10, 1996 | | |
| NAMCO Museum Vol. 2 | Namco | Namco^{JP}, Namco Hometek^{NA}, Sony Computer Entertainment^{EU} | February 9, 1996 | November 22, 1996 | October 10, 1996 | | |
| NAMCO Museum Vol. 3 | Namco | Namco^{JP}, Namco Hometek^{NA}, Sony Computer Entertainment^{EU} | June 21, 1996 | February 12, 1997 | February 5, 1997 | | |
| NAMCO Museum Vol. 4 | Namco | Namco^{JP}, Namco Hometek^{NA}, Sony Computer Entertainment^{EU} | November 8, 1996 | August 18, 1997 | July 10, 1997 | | |
| NAMCO Museum Vol. 5 | Namco | Namco^{JP}, Namco Hometek^{NA}, Sony Computer Entertainment^{EU} | February 28, 1997 | February 26, 1998 | November 15, 1997 | | |
| Namco Soccer Prime Goal •J-League Prime Goal EX^{JP} | Namco | Namco^{JP}, Namco Hometek^{NA} | September 29, 1995 | November 1996 | Unreleased | | |
| Nanatsu no Hikan | Koei | Koei | August 9, 1996 | Unreleased | Unreleased | | |
| Naniwa no Akindo: Futte Nanbo no Saikoro Jinsei | OeRSTED | Sony Music Entertainment Japan | March 28, 1997 | Unreleased | Unreleased | | |
| Naniwa Kinyuu Michi | Kodansha | Kodansha | July 19, 2001 | Unreleased | Unreleased | | |
| Naniwa Wangan Battle | Medioza | Medioza | March 26, 1998 | Unreleased | Unreleased | | |
| Nankuro | Success | Success | May 27, 1999 | Unreleased | Unreleased | | |
| Nankuro 2 | Success | Success | January 27, 2000 | Unreleased | Unreleased | | |
| Nankuro 3 | Success | Success | November 30, 2000 | Unreleased | Unreleased | | |
| Nankuro 4 | Success | Success | May 24, 2001 | Unreleased | Unreleased | | |
| NanoTek Warrior | Tetragon Inc. | Virgin Interactive Entertainment | May 9, 1997 | June 1997 | February 28, 1997 | | |
| Nantettantei Idol: The Jigsaw Puzzle | | Bandai | October 10, 2002 | Unreleased | Unreleased | | |
| Naruto: Shinobi no Sato no Jintori Kassen | Dimps Corporation | Bandai | June 26, 2003 | Unreleased | Unreleased | | |
| NASCAR 98 | Stormfront Studios | EA Sports | Unreleased | Unreleased | October 10, 1997 | | |
| NASCAR 99 | Stormfront Studios | EA Sports | Unreleased | Unreleased | September 22, 1998 | | |
| NASCAR 2000 | Stormfront Studios | EA Sports | Unreleased | Unreleased | September 24, 1999 | | |
| NASCAR 2001 | EA Black Box | EA Sports | Unreleased | Unreleased | October 30, 2000 | | |
| NASCAR Heat | Monster Games | Hasbro Interactive | Unreleased | Unreleased | November 6, 2000 | | |
| NASCAR Racing | Papyrus Design Group | Sierra On-Line | Unreleased | Unreleased | September 30, 1996 | | |
| NASCAR Rumble | EA Sports | EA Sports | Unreleased | Unreleased | February 3, 2000 | | |
| NASCAR Thunder 2002 | EA Tiburon | Electronic Arts | Unreleased | Unreleased | October 7, 2001 | | |
| NASCAR Thunder 2003 | EA Sports | Electronic Arts | Unreleased | Unreleased | September 19, 2002 | | |
| NASCAR Thunder 2004 | EA Sports | EA Sports | Unreleased | Unreleased | September 16, 2003 | | |
| Natsuiro Kenjutsu Komachi | NEC Interchannel | NEC Interchannel | March 16, 2000 | Unreleased | Unreleased | | |
| Navit | Artdink | Artdink | September 3, 1998 | Unreleased | Unreleased | | |
| Nazo-Oh | | Bandai | August 30, 1996 | Unreleased | Unreleased | | |
| NBA Basketball 2000 | Radical Entertainment | Fox Interactive | Unreleased | 1999 | October 31, 1999 | | |
| NBA Fastbreak '98 | Visual Concepts | Midway Games | Unreleased | Unreleased | November 10, 1997 | | |
| NBA Hangtime | Midway | Midway | Unreleased | Unreleased | May 15, 1997 | | |
| NBA Hoopz | Eurocom Entertainment Software | Midway Games | Unreleased | Unreleased | February 17, 2001 | | |
| NBA In The Zone | Konami | Konami | Unreleased | 1995 | December 14, 1995 | | |
| NBA In The Zone 2 | Konami | Konami | Unreleased | 1996 | November 21, 1996 | | |
| NBA In The Zone '98 •NBA Pro 98^{AU} | Konami | Konami | Unreleased | 1997 | January 31, 1998 | | |
| NBA In The Zone '99 | Konami | Konami | Unreleased | Unreleased | March 31, 1999 | | |
| NBA In The Zone 2000 | Konami | Konami | Unreleased | Unreleased | February 2, 2000 | | |
| NBA Jam Extreme | Sculptured Software | Acclaim Entertainment | Unreleased | 1996 | October 31, 1996 | | |
| NBA Jam Tournament Edition | Iguana UK | Acclaim Entertainment | Unreleased | 1995 | September 9, 1995 | | |
| NBA Live 96 | EA Canada | THQ | June 14, 1996 | May 1996 | March 10, 1996 | | |
| NBA Live 97 | EA Canada | THQ | February 28, 1997 | December 1996 | November 16, 1996 | | |
| NBA Live 98 | EA Canada | Electronic Arts | April 2, 1998 | December 1997 | November 10, 1997 | | |
| NBA Live 99 | EA Canada | EA Sports | April 28, 1999 | 1998 | November 15, 1998 | | |
| NBA Live 2000 | EA Canada | EA Sports | February 24, 2000 | 1999 | November 16, 1999 | | |
| NBA Live 2001 | EA Sports | EA Sports | Unreleased | November 10, 2000 | October 16, 2000 | | |
| NBA Live 2002 | EA Sports | Electronic Arts | Unreleased | November 23, 2001 | November 16, 2001 | | |
| NBA Live 2003 | EA Canada | EA Sports | Unreleased | Unreleased | October 8, 2002 | | |
| NBA ShootOut | London Studio | Sony Computer Entertainment | June 5, 1996 | March 20, 1996 | March 10, 1996 | | |
| NBA ShootOut '97 | London Studio | Sony Computer Entertainment | June 27, 1997 | March 20, 1997 | March 11, 1997 | | |
| NBA ShootOut 98 | Sony Interactive Studios America | Sony Computer Entertainment | Unreleased | May 28, 1998 | March 11, 1998 | | |
| NBA ShootOut 2000 | 989 Sports | 989 Sports | Unreleased | Unreleased | December 21, 1999 | | |
| NBA ShootOut 2001 | 989 Sports | SCEA | Unreleased | Unreleased | October 24, 2000 | | |
| NBA ShootOut 2002 | 989 Sports | SCEA | Unreleased | Unreleased | September 21, 2001 | | |
| NBA ShootOut 2003 | 989 Studios | 989 Studios | Unreleased | Unreleased | September 25, 2002 | | |
| NBA ShootOut 2004 | 989 Sports | SCEA | Unreleased | Unreleased | October 8, 2003 | | |
| NBA Showtime: NBA on NBC | Eurocom | Midway | Unreleased | 1999 | November 16, 1999 | | |
| NCAA Basketball: Final Four 97 | High Voltage Software | Mindscape | Unreleased | Unreleased | March 31, 1997 | | |
| NCAA Final Four 99 | Killer Game | 989 Sports | Unreleased | Unreleased | January 13, 1999 | | |
| NCAA Final Four 2000 | 989 Sports | 989 Sports | Unreleased | Unreleased | October 31, 1999 | | |
| NCAA Final Four 2001 | 989 Sports | SCEA | Unreleased | Unreleased | November 15, 2000 | | |
| NCAA Football 98 | EA Tiburon | Electronic Arts | Unreleased | Unreleased | August 5, 1997 | | |
| NCAA Football 99 | EA Tiburon | EA Sports | Unreleased | Unreleased | August 1, 1998 | | |
| NCAA Football 2000 | EA Sports | EA Sports | Unreleased | Unreleased | July 27, 1999 | | |
| NCAA Football 2001 | EA Sports | EA Sports | Unreleased | Unreleased | July 26, 2000 | | |
| NCAA Gamebreaker | Sony Interactive Studios America | SCEA | Unreleased | Unreleased | August 31, 1996 | | |
| NCAA Gamebreaker 98 | SCEA | SCEA | Unreleased | Unreleased | August 1, 1997 | | |
| NCAA Gamebreaker 99 | 989 Sports | 989 Sports | Unreleased | Unreleased | October 10, 1998 | | |
| NCAA Gamebreaker 2000 | Red Zone Entertainment | 989 Sports | Unreleased | Unreleased | August 10, 1999 | | |
| NCAA Gamebreaker 2001 | 989 Sports | SCEA | Unreleased | Unreleased | August 21, 2000 | | |
| NCAA March Madness 98 | EA Sports | Electronic Arts | Unreleased | Unreleased | February 28, 1998 | | |
| NCAA March Madness 99 | EA Sports | EA Sports | Unreleased | Unreleased | November 30, 1998 | | |
| NCAA March Madness 2000 | Black Ops Entertainment | EA Sports | Unreleased | Unreleased | September 30, 1999 | | |
| NCAA March Madness 2001 | Black Ops Entertainment | EA Sports | Unreleased | Unreleased | November 29, 2000 | | |
| Necronomicon: The Dawning of Darkness | Cryo Interactive | The Adventure Company | Unreleased | November 9, 2001 | Unreleased | | |
| Nectaris: Military Madness | Matrix Software | Jaleco Entertainment | Unreleased | Unreleased | December 10, 1998 | | |
| Need for Speed II; Over Drivin' II^{JP} | EA Canada | Electronic Arts | July 3, 1997 | 1997 | March 31, 1997 | | |
| Need for Speed III: Hot Pursuit; Over Drivin' III: Hot Pursuit^{JP} | EA Canada | Electronic Arts | September 23, 1998 | April 3, 1998 | March 25, 1998 | | |
| Need for Speed: High Stakes^{NA} •Need for Speed: Road Challenge^{PAL,BR} •Over Drivin' IV^{JP} | EA Canada | Electronic Arts | June 17, 1999 | March 30, 1999 | March 26, 1999 | P | |
| Need for Speed: Porsche Unleashed •Need for Speed: Porsche^{PAL} •Need for Speed: Porsche 2000^{PAL} | Eden Studios | Electronic Arts | Unreleased | June 23, 2000; September 21, 2001 | February 29, 2000 | P | |
| Nekketsu Oyako | Technosoft | Technosoft | December 3, 1994 | Unreleased | Unreleased | | |
| Neko na Ka-n-ke-i | Victor Interactive Software | Victor Interactive Software | November 5, 1998 | Unreleased | Unreleased | | |
| Neko Zamurai | Human Entertainment | Human Entertainment | March 4, 1999 | Unreleased | Unreleased | | |
| Nemuru Mayu: Sleeping Cocoon | Asmik Ace | Asmik Ace | March 23, 2000 | Unreleased | Unreleased | | |
| Neo Atlas | Artdink | Artdink | February 26, 1998 | Unreleased | Unreleased | | |
| Neo Atlas II | Artdink | Artdink | September 2, 1999 | Unreleased | Unreleased | | |
| Neo Planet | Map Japan | GungHo Online Entertainment | July 5, 1996 | Unreleased | Unreleased | | |
| Neorude | TechnoSoft | TechnoSoft | May 9, 1997 | Unreleased | Unreleased | | |
| Neorude 2 | TechnoSoft | TechnoSoft | November 20, 1997 | Unreleased | Unreleased | | |
| Neorude: Kizamareta Monshou | TechnoSoft | TechnoSoft | December 16, 1999 | Unreleased | Unreleased | | |
| Nessa no Hoshi | Itochu | Itochu | September 11, 1997 | Unreleased | Unreleased | | |
| Netz Magazine: Altezza | Dentsu | Netz Magazine | November 27, 1998 | Unreleased | Unreleased | | |
| Neues | Imageworks | Escot | February 10, 2000 | Unreleased | Unreleased | | |
| Newman/Haas Racing | Studio 33 | Psygnosis | Unreleased | Unreleased | March 31, 1998 | | |
| Next King: Koi no Sennen Oukoku | Alfa System | Bandai | June 27, 1997 | Unreleased | Unreleased | | |
| The Next Tetris | Blue Planet Software | Hasbro Interactive^{NA, PAL}, Bullet-Proof Software^{JP} | January 7, 1999 | 1999 | May 31, 1999 | | |
| The Next Tetris DLX (Note: update for The Next Tetris.) | Blue Planet Software | Bullet-Proof Software | December 16, 1999 | Unreleased | Unreleased | | |
| NFL Blitz | Midway | Midway | Unreleased | Unreleased | September 10, 1998 | | |
| NFL Blitz 2000 | Midway | Midway | Unreleased | Unreleased | August 24, 1999 | | |
| NFL Blitz 2001 | Midway | Midway | Unreleased | Unreleased | September 12, 2000 | | |
| NFL Full Contact | Robin Antonick | Konami | Unreleased | Unreleased | August 10, 1996 | | |
| NFL GameDay | Sony Interactive Studios America | SCEA | Unreleased | Unreleased | November 10, 1995 | | |
| NFL GameDay 97 | Sony Interactive Studios America | SCEA | Unreleased | Unreleased | November 30, 1996 | | |
| NFL GameDay 98 | 989 Studios | SCEA | Unreleased | Unreleased | August 26, 1997 | | |
| NFL GameDay 99 | Red Line Studios | 989 Studios | Unreleased | Unreleased | August 26, 1998 | | |
| NFL GameDay 2000 | Red Zone Entertainment | 989 Sports | Unreleased | Unreleased | July 31, 1999 | | |
| NFL GameDay 2001 | 989 Sports | SCEA | Unreleased | Unreleased | August 16, 2000 | | |
| NFL GameDay 2002 | 989 Sports | SCEA | Unreleased | Unreleased | August 8, 2001 | | |
| NFL GameDay 2003 | 989 Sports | SCEA | Unreleased | Unreleased | August 14, 2002 | | |
| NFL GameDay 2004 | 989 Sports | SCEA | Unreleased | Unreleased | August 12, 2003 | | |
| NFL GameDay 2005 | 989 Studios | 989 Sports | Unreleased | Unreleased | August 10, 2004 | | |
| NFL Quarterback Club 97 | Iguana Entertainment | Acclaim Entertainment | Unreleased | Unreleased | November 30, 1996 | | |
| NFL Xtreme | 989 Sports | SCEA | Unreleased | October 1998 | June 30, 1998 | | |
| NFL Xtreme 2 | 989 Sports | 989 Sports | Unreleased | Unreleased | July 20, 1999 | | |
| N-Gauge Unten Kibun Game: Gatan Goton | Beyond Interactive | Toshiba EMI | March 11, 1999 | Unreleased | Unreleased | | |
| NGEN Racing | Curly Monsters | Infogrames | Unreleased | May 12, 2000 | May 31, 2000 | | |
| NHL 97 | Visual Concepts | EA Sports | Unreleased | Unreleased | October 15, 1996 | | |
| NHL 98 | EA Sports | EA Sports | Unreleased | Unreleased | August 31, 1997 | | |
| NHL 99 | EA Canada | EA Sports | Unreleased | Unreleased | October 1, 1998 | | |
| NHL 2000 | EA Sports | EA Sports | Unreleased | 1999 | September 30, 1999 | | |
| NHL 2001 | Page 44 Studios | EA Sports | Unreleased | Unreleased | September 26, 2000 | | |
| NHL Blades of Steel 2000 | Konami | Konami | March 30, 2000 | 2000 | March 6, 2000 | | |
| NHL Breakaway 98 | Sculptured Software | Acclaim Entertainment | Unreleased | Unreleased | September 30, 1997 | | |
| NHL Championship 2000 | Radical Entertainment | Fox Interactive | Unreleased | Unreleased | October 6, 1999 | | |
| NHL FaceOff | Sony Interactive Studios America | SCEA | Unreleased | 1996 | November 30, 1995 | | |
| NHL FaceOff '97 •NHL PowerRink '97^{JP} | Killer Game | SCEA | May 30, 1997 | 1997 | October 23, 1996 | | |
| NHL FaceOff 98 | Killer Game | SCEA | Unreleased | April 1998 | September 24, 1997 | | |
| NHL FaceOff 99 | Killer Game | 989 Sports | Unreleased | 1999 | October 3, 1998 | | |
| NHL FaceOff 2000 | SolWorks | 989 Sports | Unreleased | Unreleased | September 14, 1999 | | |
| NHL FaceOff 2001 | SolWorks | SCEA | Unreleased | Unreleased | September 5, 2000 | | |
| NHL Open Ice: 2 on 2 Challenge | Avalanche Software | Midway | Unreleased | Unreleased | November 30, 1996 | | |
| NHL PowerPlay '96 | Radical Entertainment | Virgin Interactive Entertainment | Unreleased | Unreleased | September 30, 1996 | | |
| NHL PowerPlay 98 | Radical Entertainment | Virgin Interactive Entertainment | Unreleased | Unreleased | August 31, 1997 | | |
| NHL Rock the Rink | EA Canada | Electronic Arts | Unreleased | Unreleased | March 16, 2000 | | |
| Nibiiro no Koubou: 32-nin no Sensha Chou | Shangri-La | Shangri-La | February 28, 1997 | Unreleased | Unreleased | | |
| Nice Cats | Midas Interactive | The Code Monkeys | Unreleased | September 1, 2000 | Unreleased | | |
| Nichibutsu Mahjong: Joshikou Meijinsen | Nichibutsu | Nichibutsu | May 26, 1995 | Unreleased | Unreleased | | |
| Nicktoons Racing | Software Creations | Infogrames | Unreleased | 2001 | September 7, 2001 | | |
| Night Head: The Labyrinth | Scitron & Art. | Fuji Television Network, Pony Canyon | November 17, 1995 | Unreleased | Unreleased | | |
| Night Raid | Takumi Corporation | Takumi Corporation | October 10, 2002 | Unreleased | Unreleased | | |
| Night Striker | Fill-in-Cafe | Ving | July 28, 1995 | Unreleased | Unreleased | | |
| Nightmare Creatures | Kalisto | Activision | February 26, 1998 | January 1998 | October 30, 1997 | | |
| Nightmare Creatures II | Kalisto | Konami | Unreleased | September 8, 2000 | May 24, 2000 | | |
| Nightruth: Explanation of the paranormal - "Yami no Tobira" | Sonnet | Sonnet | November 1, 1996 | Unreleased | Unreleased | | |
| Nijiiro Dodgeball: Otome-tachi no Seishun | Will | Atlus | December 12, 2002 | Unreleased | Unreleased | | |
| Nijiiro Twinkle: Guruguru Daisakusen | ASCII | ASCII | August 27, 1998 | Unreleased | Unreleased | | |
| Nikakudori Deluxe | DigiCube | DigiCube | April 25, 2002 | Unreleased | Unreleased | | |
| Ningyo no Rakuin | NEC Interchannel | NEC Interchannel | August 3, 2000 | Unreleased | Unreleased | | |
| Ninja Jaja Marukun Oniriki Ninpoucho | Infinity | Jaleco | February 21, 1997 | Unreleased | Unreleased | | |
| Ninja: Shadow of Darkness | Core Design | Eidos | Unreleased | September 1998 | October 1, 1998 | | |
| Ninku | Tose | Tomy | December 22, 1995 | Unreleased | Unreleased | | |
| Ninpu Sentai Hurricaneger | | Bandai | November 28, 2002 | Unreleased | Unreleased | | |
| Nippon Golf Kyoukai Kanshuu: Double Eagle | Graphic Research | Sunsoft | May 30, 1997 | Unreleased | Unreleased | | |
| Nippon Pro Mahjong Renmei Kounin: Doujou Yaburi | Chat Noir | Naxat Soft | May 30, 1997 | Unreleased | Unreleased | | |
| Nippon Pro Mahjong Renmei Kounin: Doujou Yaburi 2 | Chat Noir | Naxat Soft | December 22, 1999 | Unreleased | Unreleased | | |
| Nippon Pro Mahjong Renmei Kounin: Honkaku Pro Mahjong | Chat Noir | Naxat Soft | November 29, 2001 | Unreleased | Unreleased | | |
| Nippon Pro Mahjong Renmei Kounin: Shin Tetsuman | Chat Noir | Naxat Soft | October 8, 1998 | Unreleased | Unreleased | | |
| Nippon Sumo Kyoukai Kounin: Nippon Oozumou | Konami | Konami | July 13, 2000 | Unreleased | Unreleased | | |
| Nishijin Pachinko Tengoku EX | KSS | KSS | August 26, 1999 | Unreleased | Unreleased | | |
| Nishijin Pachinko Tengoku Vol. 1 | KSS | KSS | January 31, 1997 | Unreleased | Unreleased | | |
| Nishijin Pachinko Tengoku Vol. 2 | KSS | KSS | July 24, 1997 | Unreleased | Unreleased | | |
| Nishijin Pachinko Tengoku Vol. 3 | KSS | KSS | December 17, 1998 | Unreleased | Unreleased | | |
| Nishijin Pachinko Tettei Kouryaku: CR Hanaman Sokuhou & CR Obake Land | Media Rings | Media Rings | October 11, 2000 | Unreleased | Unreleased | | |
| No-Appointment Gals: Olympos | Human Entertainment | Human Entertainment | October 25, 1996 | Unreleased | Unreleased | | |
| No Fear Downhill Mountain Biking | Unique Development Studios | Codemasters | Unreleased | Unreleased | November 16, 1999 | | |
| No One Can Stop Mr. Domino! | Artdink | Artdink^{JP}, Acclaim Entertainment^{NA}, [[[JVC Music Europe]]^{PAL} | January 8, 1998 | September 1998 | December 2, 1998 | | |
| Nobunaga Hiroku: Ge-Ten no Yume | Athena | Athena | May 30, 1997 | Unreleased | Unreleased | | |
| Nobunaga no Yabou Returns | Koei | Koei | August 2, 1996 | Unreleased | Unreleased | | |
| Nobunaga no Yabou: Bushou Fuuunroku | Koei | Koei | February 18, 1999 | Unreleased | Unreleased | | |
| Nobunaga no Yabou: Haouden | Koei | Koei | September 15, 1995 | Unreleased | Unreleased | | |
| Nobunaga no Yabou: Reppuuden •Nobunaga no Yabou: Reppuuden with Power Up Kit^{JP} | Koei | Koei | September 9, 1999 | Unreleased | Unreleased | | |
| Nobunaga no Yabou: Sengouku Gunyuuden | Koei | Koei | March 7, 1998 | Unreleased | Unreleased | | |
| Nobunaga no Yabou: Shouseiroku •Nobunaga no Yabou: Shouseiroku with Power-Up Kit^{JP} | Koei | Koei | November 27, 1997 | Unreleased | Unreleased | | |
| Nobunaga no Yabou: Tenshouki •Nobunaga no Yabou: Tenshouki with Power-Up Kit^{JP} | Koei | Koei | March 29, 1996 | Unreleased | Unreleased | | |
| Nobunaga no Yabou: Zenkokuban | Koei | Koei | January 22, 1998 | Unreleased | Unreleased | | |
| Nobunaga Shippuuki: Ko | Bullet-Proof Software | Bullet-Proof Software | April 26, 1996 | Unreleased | Unreleased | | |
| Noddy's Magic Adventure | Mind's Eye Productions | BBC Multimedia | Unreleased | December 1, 2000 | Unreleased | | |
| NOeL: Not Digital | Pioneer LDC | Pioneer LDC | July 26, 1996 | Unreleased | Unreleased | | |
| NOeL: La Neige | Pioneer LDC | Pioneer LDC | February 26, 1998 | Unreleased | Unreleased | | |
| NOeL: La Neige Special | Pioneer LDC | Pioneer LDC | August 6, 1998 | Unreleased | Unreleased | | |
| NOeL 3: Mission on the Line | Pioneer LDC | Pioneer LDC | March 11, 1999 | Unreleased | Unreleased | | |
| Noon | Micro Cabin | Micro Cabin | January 29, 1998 | Unreleased | Unreleased | | |
| Norse By Norsewest | Beam Software | Interplay | Unreleased | May 1997 | November 17, 1997 | | |
| Not Treasure Hunter | Acti-Art | Acti-Art | December 20, 1996 | Unreleased | Unreleased | | |
| The Note^{PAL} •Koukai Sarena Katta Shuki: The Note^{JP} | Team Bughouse | SunSoft | January 17, 1997 | October 1, 1997 | Unreleased | | |
| Novastorm | Psygnosis | Psygnosis | March 1, 1996 | September 29, 1995 | November 2, 1995 | | |
| Novels: Game Center Arashi R | Visit | Visit | May 4, 1999 | Unreleased | Unreleased | | |
| Nuclear Strike | Electronic Arts | Electronic Arts | Unreleased | September 1997 | August 31, 1997 | | |
| Nukumori no Naka de | Zero System | Zero System | August 30, 2001 | Unreleased | Unreleased | | |
| NuPa: Numeric Paint Puzzle | Jupiter Corporation | Tomy | March 29, 1996 | Unreleased | Unreleased | | |
| Nurse Monogatari | Mycom | Mycom | April 15, 1999 | Unreleased | Unreleased | | |
| Nyan to Wonderful | Pandora Box | Banpresto | August 30, 1996 | Unreleased | Unreleased | | |
| Oasis Road | Idea Factory | Idea Factory | February 25, 1999 | Unreleased | Unreleased | | |
| Ocha no ma Battle | Hori | Hori | December 14, 2000 | Unreleased | Unreleased | | |
| Ochan no Oekaki Logic | SunSoft | SunSoft | September 8, 1995 | Unreleased | Unreleased | | |
| Ochan no Oekaki Logic 2 | SunSoft | SunSoft | September 27, 1996 | Unreleased | Unreleased | | |
| Ochan no Oekaki Logic 3 | SunSoft | SunSoft | February 15, 2001 | Unreleased | Unreleased | | |
| Oda Nobunaga Den | Koei | Koei | September 23, 1998 | Unreleased | Unreleased | | |
| Odo Odo Oddity | IDC | IDC | March 14, 1997 | Unreleased | Unreleased | | |
| Oddworld: Abe's Exoddus •Abe '99^{JP} | Oddworld Inhabitants | GT Interactive | August 26, 1999 | November 27, 1998 | October 31, 1999 | P | |
| Oddworld: Abe's Oddysee •Abe a Go Go^{JP} | Oddworld Inhabitants | GT Interactive | December 11, 1997 | September 15, 1997 | September 15, 1997 | P | |
| O.D.T. | Psygnosis | Psygnosis | Unreleased | Unreleased | August 31, 1998 | | |
| Oekaki Puzzle | Success | Success | May 27, 1999 | Unreleased | Unreleased | | |
| Oekaki Puzzle 2 | Success | Success | January 27, 2000 | Unreleased | Unreleased | | |
| Oekaki Puzzle 3 | Success | Success | June 29, 2000 | Unreleased | Unreleased | | |
| Oekaki Puzzle 4 | Success | Success | November 30, 2000 | Unreleased | Unreleased | | |
| Oekaki Puzzle 5 | Success | Success | April 26, 2002 | Unreleased | Unreleased | | |
| Off-World Interceptor Extreme | Crystal Dynamics | Crystal Dynamics | November 22, 1995 | November 15, 1995 | September 29, 1995 | | |
| Ogre Battle: The March of the Black Queen | Quest | Atlus | September 27, 1996 | Unreleased | August 6, 1997 | | |
| Oh No! | Asmik Ace | Asmik Ace | November 16, 2000 | Unreleased | Unreleased | | |
| Oha Star Dance Dance Revolution | Konami | Konami | September 14, 2000 | Unreleased | Unreleased | | |
| Oja Majo Doremi | | Bandai | March 20, 2002 | Unreleased | Unreleased | | |
| Oja Majo Doremi Dokkan! Nijiiro Paradise | | Bandai | November 28, 2002 | Unreleased | Unreleased | | |
| Oja Majo Do-Re-Mi #: Mahodou Dance Carnival! | | Bandai | September 21, 2000 | Unreleased | Unreleased | | |
| Ojyousama Express | MediaWorks | MediaWorks | July 30, 1998 | Unreleased | Unreleased | | |
| Okada Toshi no Tsume Shougi Kyoushitsu Nintei-Ou | ASCII Entertainment | ASCII Entertainment | December 17, 1998 | Unreleased | Unreleased | | |
| Okappari-Oh | Spiel | Naxat Soft | August 6, 1998 | Unreleased | Unreleased | | |
| Olympia Takasago: Virtua Pachi-Slot III | Map Japan | Map Japan | May 21, 1998 | Unreleased | Unreleased | | |
| Olympia Yamasa: Virtua Pachi-Slot II: Jissen! Bishoujo Kouryaku Hou | Map Japan | Map Japan | April 18, 1997 | Unreleased | Unreleased | | |
| Olympic Soccer: Atlanta 1996 | Silicon Dreams Studio | Eidos Interactive | November 8, 1996 | July 1996 | July 18, 1996 | | |
| Olympic Summer Games | Silicon Dreams Studio | Eidos Interactive | Unreleased | Unreleased | June 18, 1996 | | |
| Omega Assault | NAPS team | Phoenix Games | Unreleased | August 19, 2004 | Unreleased | | |
| Omega Boost | Polyphony Digital | Sony Computer Entertainment | April 22, 1999 | September 14, 1999 | August 31, 1999 | | |
| Omiai Commando: Bakappuru ni Tukkomi o | Magical Company | Enix | March 30, 2000 | Unreleased | Unreleased | | |
| Omise de Tensyu | Technosoft | Technosoft | April 8, 1999 | Unreleased | Unreleased | | |
| Omizu no Hanamichi | Pony Canyon | Pony Canyon | August 17, 2000 | Unreleased | Unreleased | | |
| One | Visual Concepts | ASC Games | Unreleased | Unreleased | November 30, 1997 | | |
| One on One | Jorudan | Jorudan | November 26, 1998 | Unreleased | Unreleased | | |
| One Piece Mansion | Capcom | Capcom | June 21, 2001 | November 16, 2001 | October 1, 2001 | | |
| One Piece: Ocean's Dream | FlipFlop | Bandai | May 1, 2003 | Unreleased | Unreleased | | |
| One Piece: Tobidase Kaizokudan! | | Bandai | August 2, 2001 | Unreleased | Unreleased | | |
| One Two Smash: Tanoshii Tennis | Tears | Hect | February 24, 2000 | Unreleased | Unreleased | | |
| The Oni Taiji: Mezase! Nidaime Momotarou | Prism Inc. | Nippon Ichi Software | October 13, 1995 | Unreleased | Unreleased | | |
| Oni Zero: Fukkatsu | Pandora Box | Pandora Box | March 22, 2001 | Unreleased | Unreleased | | |
| Ooedo Huusui Ingaritsu Hanabi 2 | Magical Company | Magical Company | June 22, 2000 | Unreleased | Unreleased | | |
| The Open Golf: History of Turnberry | Banpresto | Banpresto | July 19, 1996 | Unreleased | Unreleased | | |
| Option Tuning Car Battle | MTO | MTO | January 15, 1998 | Unreleased | Unreleased | | |
| Option Tuning Car Battle 2 | Jaleco | Jaleco | February 18, 1999 | Unreleased | Unreleased | | |
| Option Tuning Car Battle Spec-R | Caps | MTO | May 11, 2000 | Unreleased | Unreleased | | |
| Oracle no Houseki: Jewels of the Oracle | Infini | SunSoft | December 6, 1996 | Unreleased | Unreleased | | |
| Ore no Ryouri | Japan Studio | SCEI | September 9, 1999 | Unreleased | Unreleased | | |
| Ore no Shikabane wo Koete Yuke | Alfa System | SCEI | June 17, 1999 | Unreleased | Unreleased | | |
| Osaka Naniwa Matenrow | Kid | Kid | April 8, 1999 | Unreleased | Unreleased | | |
| Oshaberi Oekaki Kikansha Thomas to Nakamatachi | Banpresto | Banpresto | December 19, 2002 | Unreleased | Unreleased | | |
| Oshaberi Oekaki Soreike! Anpanman | Banpresto | Banpresto | December 19, 2002 | Unreleased | Unreleased | | |
| Oshigotoshiki Jinsei Game: Mezase Shokugyou King | Takara | Takara | December 14, 2000 | Unreleased | Unreleased | | |
| Otenami Haiken | Success | Success | June 21, 2001 | Unreleased | Unreleased | | |
| Otenki Kororin | Takumi Corporation | Takumi Corporation | May 2, 2002 | Unreleased | Unreleased | | |
| Othello World II: Yume to Michi e no Chousen | Pre Stage | Tsukuda Original | December 8, 1995 | Unreleased | Unreleased | | |
| Otona no Asobi | Nichibutsu | Nichibutsu | December 2, 1998 | Unreleased | Unreleased | | |
| Ouji-sama LV1 | Alice Blue | Kid | March 20, 2002 | Unreleased | Unreleased | | |
| Ouji-sama LV1.5 (Note: stand-alone expansion for Ouji-sama LV1.) (Note: Contains mini-games.) | Alice Blue | Kid | February 20, 2003 | Unreleased | Unreleased | | |
| Oukyuu no Hihou: Tenshon | Wizard | Vap | September 27, 1996 | Unreleased | Unreleased | | |
| Ouma ga Toki | Break | Victor Interactive Software | August 9, 2001 | Unreleased | Unreleased | | |
| Ouma ga Toki 2 | Break | Victor Interactive Software | September 13, 2001 | Unreleased | Unreleased | | |
| Out Live: Be Eliminate Yesterday | Sunsoft | SunSoft | July 24, 1997 | Unreleased | Unreleased | | |
| OverBlood | Riverhillsoft | Electronic Arts^{NA}, Electronic Arts^{PAL}, Riverhillsoft^{JP} | August 2, 1996 | June 1997 | May 18, 1997 | | |
| OverBlood 2 | Riverhillsoft | Riverhillsoft^{JP}, Evolution Games^{PAL} | July 23, 1998 | April 13, 2001 | Unreleased | | |
| Over Drivin' Skyline Memorial | Electronic Arts Victor | Electronic Arts Victor | October 2, 1997 | Unreleased | Unreleased | | |
| Oyaji no Jikan: Nechan, Hanafuda de Shoubu Ya | Visit | Visit | February 17, 2000 | Unreleased | Unreleased | | |
| Oyaji no Jikan: Nechan, Mahjong de Shoubu Ya | Visit | Visit | February 17, 2000 | Unreleased | Unreleased | | |
| Oyaji no Jikan: Nechan, Tsuri Iku De! | Visit | Visit | February 17, 2000 | Unreleased | Unreleased | | |
| P.K.'s Place: Carlos at the Races! | Lightspan | Lightspan | Unreleased | Unreleased | 1998 | | |
| P.K.'s Place: Daphne and the Seventh Wonder! | Lightspan | Lightspan | Unreleased | Unreleased | 1998 | | |
| P.K.'s Place: Hoopo at Sea! | Lightspan | Lightspan | Unreleased | Unreleased | 1998 | | |
| P.K.'s Place: Party on the Patio! | Lightspan | Lightspan | Unreleased | Unreleased | 1998 | | |
| Paca Paca Passion | Produce! | Produce! | June 24, 1999 | Unreleased | Unreleased | | |
| Paca Paca Passion 2 | Produce! | Produce! | April 20, 2000 | Unreleased | Unreleased | | |
| Paca Paca Passion Special | Produce! | CyberFront | April 4, 2002 | Unreleased | Unreleased | | |
| Pachi Pachi Saga | TEN | TEN | April 26, 1996 | Unreleased | Unreleased | | |
| Pachi-Slot Aruze Oukoku | Aruze Corp | Aruze Corp | June 3, 1999 | Unreleased | Unreleased | | |
| Pachi-Slot Aruze Oukoku 2 | Aruze Corp | Aruze Corp | November 25, 1999 | Unreleased | Unreleased | | |
| Pachi-Slot Aruze Oukoku 3 | Aruze Corp | Aruze Corp | July 19, 2000 | Unreleased | Unreleased | | |
| Pachi-Slot Aruze Oukoku 4 | Aruze Corp | Aruze Corp | December 14, 2000 | Unreleased | Unreleased | | |
| Pachi-Slot Aruze Oukoku 5 | Aruze Corp | Aruze Corp | November 15, 2001 | Unreleased | Unreleased | | |
| Pachi-Slot Kanzen Kaiseki: Wet2 Poker •Pachi-Slot Kanzen Kaiseki: Wai Wai Pulsar / 77^{JP} | Human Entertainment | Human Entertainment | March 12, 1998 | Unreleased | Unreleased | | |
| Pachi-Slot Kanzen Kouryaku: Takasago Super Project | Syscom | Syscom | May 24, 2001 | Unreleased | Unreleased | | |
| Pachi-Slot Kanzen Kouryaku: Takasago Super Project 2 | Syscom | Syscom | December 6, 2001 | Unreleased | Unreleased | | |
| Pachi-Slot Kanzen Kouryaku: Universal Koushiki Gaido Volume 1 | Syscom | Syscom | March 14, 1997 | Unreleased | Unreleased | | |
| Pachi-Slot Kanzen Kouryaku: Universal Koushiki Gaido Volume 2 | Syscom | Syscom | July 31, 1997 | Unreleased | Unreleased | | |
| Pachi-Slot Kanzen Kouryaku: Universal Koushiki Gaido Volume 3 | Syscom | Syscom | August 6, 1998 | Unreleased | Unreleased | | |
| Pachi-Slot Kanzen Kouryaku: Universal Koushiki Gaido Volume 4 | Syscom | Syscom | June 24, 1999 | Unreleased | Unreleased | | |
| Pachi-Slot Master: Sammy SP | Sammy Studios | Sammy Studios | March 18, 1999 | Unreleased | Unreleased | | |
| Pachi Slot Teiou: Big Wave - Pika Gorou - BB Junkie 7 | Bull's Eye | Bull's Eye | January 28, 1999 | Unreleased | Unreleased | | |
| Pachi-Slot Teiou 2: Kagestu / Two Pair / Beaver X | Mecko | Mecko | August 26, 1999 | Unreleased | Unreleased | | |
| Pachi-Slot Teiou 3: Sea Master X / Epsilon R / Wai Wai Pulsar | Yamasa | Media Entertainment | December 2, 1999 | Unreleased | Unreleased | | |
| Pachi-Slot Teiou 4: Oicho Kaba X / Magical Pops / Lequio 30 | Yamasa | Media Entertainment | January 27, 2000 | Unreleased | Unreleased | | |
| Pachi-Slot Teiou 5: Kongdom / Super Star Dust 2 / Flying Momonga | Yamasa | Media Entertainment | March 16, 2000 | Unreleased | Unreleased | | |
| Pachi-Slot Teiou 6: Kung-Fu Lady / BangBang / Prelude 2 | Yamasa | Media Entertainment | March 16, 2000 | Unreleased | Unreleased | | |
| Pachi-Slot Teiou 7: Maker Suishou Manual 1: Beat the Dragon 2 / Lupin Sansei / Hot Rod Queen | Yamasa | Media Entertainment | October 12, 2000 | Unreleased | Unreleased | | |
| Pachi-Slot Teiou: Maker Suishou Manual 5: Race Queen 2 / Tomcat | Yamasa | Media Entertainment | August 30, 2001 | Unreleased | Unreleased | | |
| Pachi-Slot Teiou: Maker Suishou Manual 6: Takarabune | Yamasa | Media Entertainment | November 15, 2001 | Unreleased | Unreleased | | |
| Pachi-Slot Teiou Mini: Dr. A7 | Bull's Eye | Bull's Eye | June 24, 1999 | Unreleased | Unreleased | | |
| Pachi-Slot Teiou W: Arabesque R / Hot Rod Queen | Bull's Eye | Bull's Eye | August 10, 2000 | Unreleased | Unreleased | | |
| Pachi-Slot Teiou: Battle Night / Atlantis Dome | Olympia | Media Entertainment | December 28, 2000 | Unreleased | Unreleased | | |
| Pachi-Slot Teiou: Beat the Dragon 2 | Olympia | Media Entertainment | November 30, 2000 | Unreleased | Unreleased | | |
| Pachi-Slot Teiou: Bunny Girl SP | Olympia | Media Entertainment | August 9, 2001 | Unreleased | Unreleased | | |
| Pachi-Slot Teiou: CR Soreite Hama-Chan 2 | Olympia | Media Entertainment | August 30, 2001 | Unreleased | Unreleased | | |
| Pachi-Slot Teiou: Dateline Pegasus | Olympia | Media Entertainment | August 30, 2001 | Unreleased | Unreleased | | |
| Pachi-Slot Teiou: Golgo 13 - Las Vegas | Olympia | Media Entertainment | May 30, 2002 | Unreleased | Unreleased | | |
| Pachi-Slot Teiou: Maker Suishou Manual 2: Ice Story | Olympia | Media Entertainment | March 1, 2001 | Unreleased | Unreleased | | |
| Pachi-Slot Teiou: Maker Suishou Manual 3: I'm Angel White 2 & Blue 2 | Olympia | Media Entertainment | April 26, 2001 | Unreleased | Unreleased | | |
| Pachi-Slot Teiou: Maker Suishou Manual 4: Exhaust / Ooedo Sakura Fubuki 2 | Olympia | Media Entertainment | April 26, 2001 | Unreleased | Unreleased | | |
| Pachi-Slot Teiou: Maker Suishou Manual 7: Trick Monster 2 | Olympia | Media Entertainment | February 14, 2002 | Unreleased | Unreleased | | |
| Pachi-Slot Teiou: Naniwaou Fubuki | Olympia | Media Entertainment | April 18, 2002 | Unreleased | Unreleased | | |
| Pachi-Slot Teiou: Shimabai 30 | Olympia | Media Entertainment | June 20, 2002 | Unreleased | Unreleased | | |
| Pachi-Slot Teiou: Yamasa Remix | Olympia | Media Entertainment | August 31, 2002 | Unreleased | Unreleased | | |
| Pachinko & Pachi-Slot Parlor! Pro Extra | Olympia | Nippon Telenet | September 28, 2000 | Unreleased | Unreleased | | |
| Pachinko Daisuki | Heiwa | Seta Corporation | September 20, 1996 | Unreleased | Unreleased | | |
| Pachinko Dream | Konami | Konami | October 18, 1996 | Unreleased | Unreleased | | |
| Pachinko Hall Shinso Dai Kaiten | Nexton | Nexton | February 26, 1998 | Unreleased | Unreleased | | |
| Pachio-kun: Pachinko Land Adventure | Marionette | Coconuts Japan | April 14, 1995 | Unreleased | Unreleased | | |
| Pachitte Chonmage | Hack Berry | Hack Berry | November 25, 1999 | Unreleased | Unreleased | | |
| Pachitte Chonmage 2: Kyoraku Kounin / Tanukichu 2000 & Jungle P | Hack Berry | Hack Berry | June 1, 2000 | Unreleased | Unreleased | | |
| Pachitte Chonmage 3: Kyoraku Kounin / Gladiator & Tama-chan | Hack Berry | Hack Berry | April 18, 2002 | Unreleased | Unreleased | | |
| Pac-Man World | Namco Hometek | Namco^{JP}, Namco Hometek^{NA}, Sony Computer Entertainment^{EU} | September 2, 1999 | February 28, 2000 | October 12, 1999 | | |
| Paipai | ProSoft | Selen | July 12, 2001 | Unreleased | Unreleased | | |
| Pajama Sam 3: You Are What You Eat from Your Head to Your Feet | Runecraft | Infogrames | Unreleased | 2001 | December 7, 2001 | | |
| PAL: Shinken Densetsu | Fill-in-Cafe | Tohoku Shinsha | April 25, 1997 | Unreleased | Unreleased | | |
| Palm Town | Mycom | Mycom | July 8, 1999 | Unreleased | Unreleased | | |
| Pandemonium! •Magical Hoppers^{JP} | Toys for Bob | Crystal Dynamics | February 28, 1997 | November 1996 | November 15, 1996 | P | |
| Pandemonium 2 •Miracle Jumpers^{JP} | Crystal Dynamics | Midway Games^{NA}, Crystal Dynamics^{PAL} | May 21, 1998 | November 5, 1997 | October 1, 1997 | | |
| Pandora Project: The Logic Master | NK System | Team Bughouse | May 3, 1996 | Unreleased | Unreleased | | |
| Panekit | SCEI | SCEI | August 5, 1999 | Unreleased | Unreleased | | |
| Panel Quiz Attack 25 | Fujitsu | Fujitsu | December 18, 1997 | Unreleased | Unreleased | | |
| Pangaea | Success | Success | August 26, 1999 | Unreleased | Unreleased | | |
| Panzer Bandit | Fill-in-Cafe | Banpresto | August 7, 1997 | Unreleased | Unreleased | | |
| Panzer Front | Enterbrain | ASCII Entertainment^{JP}, JVC Music Europe^{PAL}, Agetec^{NA} | December 22, 1999 | April 17, 2001 | October 9, 2001 | | |
| Panzer Front bis. (Note: update for Panzer Front.) | Enterbrain | ASCII Entertainment | February 8, 2001 | Unreleased | Unreleased | | |
| Panzer General | SSI | SSI | Unreleased | June 1996 | March 10, 1996 | | |
| PAQA | SCEI | SCEI | September 22, 1999 | Unreleased | Unreleased | | |
| Paradise Casino | DigiCube | Phoenix Games | March 28, 2002 | 2003 | Unreleased | | |
| ParanoiaScape | Jorudan | Mathilda | May 28, 1998 | Unreleased | Unreleased | | |
| PaRappa the Rapper | NanaOn-Sha | SCEI | December 6, 1996 | September 26, 1997 | November 19, 1997 | | |
| Parasite Eve | Square | Square^{JP}, Square Electronic Arts^{NA} | March 29, 1998 | Unreleased | September 8, 1998 | | |
| Parasite Eve II | Square | Square^{JP/EU}, Square Electronic Arts^{NA} | December 16, 1999 | August 25, 2000 | September 2, 2000 | P | |
| Paris-Marseille Racing | Davilex | Davilex | Unreleased | October 30, 2000 | Unreleased | | |
| Paris-Marseille Racing II | Davilex | Davilex | Unreleased | October 25, 2002 | Unreleased | | |
| Parlor Station | Aqua Rouge | GMF | August 27, 1998 | Unreleased | Unreleased | | |
| Parlor! Pro | Nippon Telenet | Irem | April 25, 1997 | Unreleased | Unreleased | | |
| Parlor! Pro 2 | Nippon Telenet | Nippon Rental | October 30, 1997 | Unreleased | Unreleased | | |
| Parlor! Pro 3 | Nippon Telenet | Nippon Rental | June 25, 1998 | Unreleased | Unreleased | | |
| Parlor! Pro 4 | Nippon Telenet | Nippon Telenet | November 12, 1998 | Unreleased | Unreleased | | |
| Parlor! Pro 5 | Nippon Telenet | Nippon Telenet | January 28, 1999 | Unreleased | Unreleased | | |
| Parlor! Pro 6 | Nippon Telenet | Nippon Telenet | February 11, 1999 | Unreleased | Unreleased | | |
| Parlor! Pro 7 | Nippon Telenet | Nippon Telenet | March 25, 1999 | Unreleased | Unreleased | | |
| Parlor! Pro 8 | Nippon Telenet | Nippon Telenet | December 9, 1999 | Unreleased | Unreleased | | |
| Parlor! Pro Jr. Vol. 1 | Nippon Telenet | Nippon Telenet | June 10, 1999 | Unreleased | Unreleased | | |
| Parlor! Pro Jr. Vol. 2 | Nippon Telenet | Nippon Telenet | November 2, 1999 | Unreleased | Unreleased | | |
| Parlor! Pro Jr. Vol. 3 | Nippon Telenet | Nippon Telenet | November 25, 1999 | Unreleased | Unreleased | | |
| Parlor! Pro Jr. Vol. 4 | Nippon Telenet | Nippon Telenet | December 22, 1999 | Unreleased | Unreleased | | |
| Parlor! Pro Jr. Vol. 5 | Nippon Telenet | Nippon Telenet | February 24, 2000 | Unreleased | Unreleased | | |
| Parlor! Pro Jr. Vol. 6 | Nippon Telenet | Nippon Telenet | March 16, 2000 | Unreleased | Unreleased | | |
| Parlor! Pro Special: CR Harenchi Gakuen & Chou-Shindai | Nippon Telenet | Nippon Telenet | November 30, 2000 | Unreleased | Unreleased | | |
| Paro Wars | Konami | KCE Tokyo | September 25, 1997 | Unreleased | Unreleased | | |
| Pastel Muses •Simple 1500 Series Vol. 20: The Puzzle | Soft Office | Soft Office, D3 Publisher | August 21, 1997 | Unreleased | Unreleased | | |
| Patriotic Pinball | Wildfire Studios | Gotham Games | Unreleased | Unreleased | April 23, 2003 | | |
| Pax Corpus | Cryo Interactive, R&P Electronic Media | Cryo Interactive | Unreleased | October 1997 | Unreleased | | |
| PD Ultraman Invader | Taito | Bandai | December 22, 1995 | Unreleased | Unreleased | | |
| Peak Performance; Touge Max: Saisoku Drift Master^{JP} | Cave | Atlus^{JP,NA}, JVC Music Europe^{PAL} | January 24, 1997 | November 1, 1997 | March 31, 1997 | | |
| Pebble Beach no Hatou Plus | T&E Soft | Soft Bank | December 13, 1996 | Unreleased | Unreleased | | |
| Pepsiman | KID | KID | March 4, 1999 | Unreleased | Unreleased | | |
| Perfect Assassin | Grolier Interactive | Grolier Interactive | Unreleased | 1998 | Unreleased | | |
| Perfect Fishing: Bass Fishing | Seta Corporation | Seta Corporation | March 4, 2000 | Unreleased | Unreleased | | |
| Perfect Fishing: Rock Fishing | Seta Corporation | Seta Corporation | March 4, 2000 | Unreleased | Unreleased | | |
| Perfect Golf 2 | Seta Corporation | Seta Corporation | May 28, 1998 | Unreleased | Unreleased | | |
| Perfect Performer: The Yellow Monkey | FunHouse | FunHouse | July 1, 1999 | Unreleased | Unreleased | | |
| Perfect Weapon •Body Hazard^{JP} | Gray Matter | ASC Games | July 3, 1997 | 1997 | November 10, 1996 | | |
| Persona | Atlus | Atlus | September 20, 1996 | Unreleased | June 24, 1996 | | |
| Persona 2: Eternal Punishment | Atlus | Atlus | June 29, 2000 | Unreleased | December 22, 2000 | | |
| Persona 2: Innocent Sin | Atlus | Atlus | June 24, 1999 | Unreleased | Unreleased | | |
| Pet in TV | MuuMuu | Sony Computer Entertainment | May 23, 1997 | 1997 | Unreleased | | |
| Pet in TV with my dear Dog | Sugar & Rockets | Sony Computer Entertainment | November 11, 1999 | Unreleased | Unreleased | | |
| Pet Pet Pet | Magical Company | Magical Company | October 7, 1999 | Unreleased | Unreleased | | |
| Peter Jacobsen's Golden Tee Golf | Incredible Technologies | Infogrames | Unreleased | Unreleased | September 20, 2000 | | |
| PGA European Tour Golf | Gremlin Interactive | Infogrames | Unreleased | 1999 | Unreleased | | |
| PGA Tour 96 | Hitmen Productions | Electronic Arts | February 23, 1996 | November 1995 | September 23, 1995 | P | |
| PGA Tour 97 | EA Sports | EA Sports | Unreleased | October 1996 | September 30, 1996 | | |
| PGA Tour 98 | NuFX | Electronic Arts | Unreleased | October 1997 | September 27, 1997 | | |
| Philosoma | G Artist | SCEA | July 28, 1995 | March 1996 | January 10, 1996 | | |
| Phix: The Adventure | Affect | Agetec | May 18, 2000 | Unreleased | July 15, 2003 | | |
| Photo Genic | Fill-in-Cafe | Sunsoft | December 18, 1997 | Unreleased | Unreleased | | |
| Pikiinya! EX | Crea-Tech | ASCII Entertainment | July 16, 1998 | Unreleased | Unreleased | | |
| Pikupiku Sentarou | Kodansha | Kodansha | February 18, 1999 | Unreleased | Unreleased | | |
| Pilot Ni Narou! •Wing Over 2^{PAL} | Beluga Computer | Victor Interactive Software •JVC Music Europe^{PAL} | September 23, 1998 | Unreleased | Unreleased | | |
| Pinball Fantasies Deluxe | Digital Illusions | Vap | October 25, 1996 | Unreleased | Unreleased | | |
| Pinball Power •Pinball: Golden Logres ^{JP} | LittleWing | Midas Interactive Entertainment | July 22, 1999 | September 1, 2000 | Unreleased | | |
| Pink Panther: Pinkadelic Pursuit •Simple 1500 Series Vol. 104: The Pink Panther: Pinkadelic Pursuit^{JP} | Etranges Libellules | Wanadoo Edition^{EU}, DreamCatcher Interactive^{NA}, D3 Publisher^{JP} | February 27, 2003 | November 29, 2002 | January 4, 2003 | | |
| Pinocchia no Miru Yume | Takara | Takara | August 5, 1999 | Unreleased | Unreleased | | |
| Pinobee | Artoon | Hudson Soft | September 5, 2002 | October 10, 2003 | April 15, 2003 | | |
| Pipe Dreams 3D | Sick Puppies | Empire Interactive | Unreleased | Unreleased | October 23, 2001 | | |
| Pitball | Time Warner Interactive | Accolade | December 6, 1996 | 1996 | October 31, 1996 | | |
| Pitfall 3D: Beyond the Jungle | Luxoflux | Activision | Unreleased | Unreleased | February 28, 1998 | | |
| Pixygarden | Imageworks | Escot | September 30, 1999 | Unreleased | Unreleased | | |
| Plane Crazy | Project Two Interactive | Inner Workings, Ltd. | Unreleased | September 15, 1999 | Unreleased | | |
| Planet Dob | Hudson Soft | Hudson Soft | November 18, 1999 | Unreleased | Unreleased | | |
| Planet Laika | Quintet, Zeque | Enix | October 21, 1999 | Unreleased | Unreleased | | |
| Planet of the Apes | Visiware Software | Ubisoft | Unreleased | 2002 | August 22, 2002 | | |
| Plarail Tetsudou Monoshiri Hyakka | Atlus | Atlus | November 14, 2002 | Unreleased | Unreleased | | |
| Play de Oboeru Chuugaku Eitango Deruderu 1200 | Graphic Research | Nagase Brothers | July 23, 1999 | Unreleased | Unreleased | | |
| Play de Oboeru Eijukugo Deruderu 750 | Graphic Research | Nagase Brothers | July 5, 2000 | Unreleased | Unreleased | | |
| Play de Oboeru Eitango Deruderu 1700: Center Shiken Level Taiou | Graphic Research | Nagase Brothers | January 14, 1999 | Unreleased | Unreleased | | |
| Play de Oboeru Kanji Kentai Deruderu 1100 | Graphic Research | Nagase Brothers | December 21, 2000 | Unreleased | Unreleased | | |
| Play de Oboeru Series Nihonshi Quiz Deruderu 1800 | Graphic Research | Nagase Brothers | February 29, 2000 | Unreleased | Unreleased | | |
| Play de Oboeru Series Sekaishi Quiz Deruderu 1800 | Graphic Research | Nagase Brothers | February 29, 2000 | Unreleased | Unreleased | | |
| Play de Oboeru TOEIC Test Goku DeruDeru 1700 | Graphic Research | Nagase Brothers | February 29, 2000 | Unreleased | Unreleased | | |
| Play Stadium | Banpresto | Banpresto | April 12, 1996 | Unreleased | Unreleased | | |
| Play Stadium 2 | Banpresto | Banpresto | April 11, 1997 | Unreleased | Unreleased | | |
| Play Stadium 3 | Banpresto | Banpresto | April 16, 1998 | Unreleased | Unreleased | | |
| Play Stadium 4: Fumetsu no Dai League Ball | Banpresto | Banpresto | July 29, 1999 | Unreleased | Unreleased | | |
| Play with the Teletubbies | Asylum Entertainment | Knowledge Adventure | Unreleased | 2000 | August 8, 2000 | | |
| Player Manager | Anco Software | Softgold | Unreleased | 1997 | Unreleased | | |
| Player Manager 2000 | Anco Software | Ubi Soft | Unreleased | June 20, 2000 | Unreleased | | |
| Player Manager Ninety Nine •Guy Roux Manager '99^{EU} | Anco Software | Anco Software | Unreleased | 1997 | Unreleased | | |
| Pocke-Kano: Fumio Ueno | Datam Polystar | Datam Polystar | December 16, 1999 | Unreleased | Unreleased | | |
| Pocke-Kano: Shizuka Houjouin | Datam Polystar | Datam Polystar | December 16, 1999 | Unreleased | Unreleased | | |
| Pocke-Kano: Yumi Aida | Datam Polystar | Datam Polystar | December 16, 1999 | Unreleased | Unreleased | | |
| Pocket Digimon World | | Bandai | June 29, 2000 | Unreleased | Unreleased | | |
| Pocket Digimon World: Cool & Nature Battle Disc (Note: stand-alone expansion for Pocket Digimon World.) | | Bandai | February 22, 2001 | Unreleased | Unreleased | | |
| Pocket Digimon World: Wind Battle Disc (Note: stand-alone expansion for Pocket Digimon World.) | | Bandai | October 26, 2000 | Unreleased | Unreleased | | |
| Pocket Dungeon | Liquid | SCEI | May 4, 1999 | Unreleased | Unreleased | | |
| Pocket Family: Happy Family Plan | Hudson Soft | Hudson Soft | July 8, 1999 | Unreleased | Unreleased | | |
| Pocket Fighter | Capcom | Capcom^{JP/NA}, Virgin Interactive Entertainment^{PAL} | June 11, 1998 | November 1998 | July 11, 1998 | | |
| Pocket Jiman | Sugar and Rockets | Sony Computer Entertainment | January 13, 2000 | Unreleased | Unreleased | | |
| Pocket MuuMuu | Sugar and Rockets | Sony Computer Entertainment | February 4, 1999 | Unreleased | Unreleased | | |
| Pocket Tuner | River Hill Software | | August 12, 1999 | Unreleased | Unreleased | | |
| PO'ed | Any Channel | Accolade^{NA}, Warner Interactive Europe^{PAL} | Unreleased | November 1996 | April 10, 1996 | | |
| Point Blank | Namco | Namco^{JP}, Namco Hometek^{NA}, Sony Computer Entertainment^{PAL} | August 7, 1997 | July 1998 | April 15, 1998 | | |
| Point Blank 2 | Namco | Namco^{JP}, Namco Hometek^{NA}, Sony Computer Entertainment^{PAL} | August 6, 1998 | September 1, 1999 | May 10, 1999 | | |
| Point Blank 3 | Namco | Namco^{JP}, Namco Hometek^{NA}, Sony Computer Entertainment^{PAL} | December 21, 2000 | 2001 | May 16, 2001 | | |
| Pojitto | Kan's | Play Avenue | September 20, 1996 | Unreleased | Unreleased | | |
| Polaris SnoCross | Vicarious Visions | Vatical Entertainment | Unreleased | Unreleased | September 8, 2000 | | |
| Policenauts | Konami | Konami | January 19, 1996 | Unreleased | Unreleased | | |
| Policenauts Private Collection (Note: Includes a playable shooting trainer and shooting sections alongside its reference and video material.) | Konami | Konami | February 9, 1996 | Unreleased | Unreleased | | |
| Pong: The Next Level | Supersonic Software | Hasbro Interactive | Unreleased | 1999 | October 19, 1999 | | |
| Ponkkikkids 21 | Sunsoft | SunSoft | December 13, 2001 | Unreleased | Unreleased | | |
| Pool Academy | Ornith | Ubi Soft | April 1, 1999 | 2001 | Unreleased | | |
| Pool Hustler | Ornith | Activision | May 21, 1998 | 1998 | November 9, 1998 | | |
| Pool Shark •Ultimate 8-Ball^{NA} | Gremlin Interactive | Gremlin Interactive, THQ^{NA} | Unreleased | January 1999 | May 31, 1999 | | |
| Pop de Cute na Shinri Test: Alabama | D3Publisher | D3Publisher | September 21, 2000 | Unreleased | Unreleased | | |
| Pop'n Music | Konami | Konami | February 25, 1999 | Unreleased | Unreleased | | |
| Pop'n Music 2 | Konami | Konami | September 14, 1999 | Unreleased | Unreleased | | |
| Pop'n Music 3 Append Disc (Note: expansion for compatible Pop'n Music key discs.) | Konami | Konami | February 10, 2000 | Unreleased | Unreleased | | |
| Pop'n Music 4 Append Disc (Note: expansion for compatible Pop'n Music key discs.) | Konami | Konami | October 12, 2000 | Unreleased | Unreleased | | |
| Pop'n Music 5 | Konami | Konami | November 22, 2001 | Unreleased | Unreleased | | |
| Pop'n Music 6 | Konami | Konami | June 27, 2002 | Unreleased | Unreleased | | |
| Pop'n Music: Animation Melody | Konami | Konami | July 27, 2000 | Unreleased | Unreleased | | |
| Pop'n Music: Disney Tunes | Konami | Konami | November 22, 2000 | Unreleased | Unreleased | | |
| Pop'n Pop | Taito | Taito | October 22, 1998 | 1998 | Unreleased | | |
| Pop'n Tanks! | Symbio Systems | Enix | July 29, 1999 | Unreleased | Unreleased | | |
| PoPoLoCrois | SCEI | SCEI | July 12, 1996 | Unreleased | Unreleased | | |
| PoPoLoCrois Monogatari II | SCEI | SCEI | January 27, 2000 | Unreleased | Unreleased | | |
| PoPoRoGue | SCEI | SCEI | November 26, 1998 | Unreleased | Unreleased | | |
| Popstar Maker; 100% Star | Teque Interactive | Eidos Interactive | Unreleased | November 23, 2001 | Unreleased | | |
| Populous: The Beginning | Bullfrog Productions | Electronic Arts | June 10, 1999 | 1999 | April 2, 1999 | | |
| Porsche Challenge | SCEE London Studio | SCEA | Unreleased | April 1997 | August 15, 1997 | P | |
| Potestas | Nexus Interact | Nexus Interact | April 12, 1996 | Unreleased | Unreleased | | |
| Power Dolls 2: Detachment of Limited Line Service | Kogado Studio | ASCII Entertainment | November 20, 1997 | Unreleased | Unreleased | | |
| Power League | Hudson Soft | Hudson Soft | November 12, 1998 | Unreleased | Unreleased | | |
| Power Move Pro Wrestling | Yuke's | Activision | Unreleased | December 20, 1996 | November 10, 1996 | | |
| Power Play Sports Trivia | Starsphere Interactive | Ubis Soft | Unreleased | Unreleased | May 15, 2002 | | |
| Power Rangers Lightspeed Rescue | Climax Group | THQ | Unreleased | December 1, 2000 | September 26, 2000 | | |
| Power Rangers Time Force | Climax Group | THQ | Unreleased | December 7, 2001 | November 2, 2001 | | |
| Power Rangers Zeo Full Tilt Battle Pinball | Kaze | Bandai | September 27, 1996 | June 1997 | September 30, 1996 | | |
| Power Serve 3D Tennis^{NA} •Ground Stroke: Advanced Tennis Game^{JP} •Power Serve^{EU} | SPS | Ocean Software^{PAL,NA}, SPS^{JP} | August 11, 1995 | February 9, 1996 | September 9, 1995 | | |
| Power Shovel •Simple 1500 Series Vol. 89: The Power Shovel^{JP} | Taito Corporation | Acclaim | September 21, 2000 | November 30, 2001 | July 15, 2001 | | |
| PowerSlave •Exhumed^{PAL} | Lobotomy Software | PlayMates, BMG Interactive^{PAL} | July 10, 1997 | April 1997 | February 28, 1997 | | |
| Power Spike Pro Beach Volleyball •Beach Volleyball^{PAL} | Carapace | Infogrames | Unreleased | October 27, 2000 | November 15, 2000 | | |
| The Powerpuff Girls: Chemical X-traction | VIS Entertainment | BAM! Entertainment | Unreleased | November 18, 2001 | December 7, 2001 | | |
| Poy Poy •Poitter's Point^{JP} | KCET | Konami | June 12, 1997 | June 1997 | September 1, 1997 | | |
| Poy Poy 2 •Poitter's Point 2^{JP} | KCET | Konami | July 9, 1998 | July 9, 1998 | Unreleased | | |
| Premier Manager 98 | Gremlin Interactive | Dinamic Multimedia | Unreleased | July 1998 | Unreleased | | |
| Premier Manager: Ninety Nine | Gremlin Interactive | Dinamic Multimedia | Unreleased | August 1999 | Unreleased | | |
| Premier Manager 2000 | Infogrames Sheffield House | Infogrames | Unreleased | March 31, 2000 | Unreleased | | |
| Primal Rage | Probe Entertainment | Time Warner Interactive | December 13, 1996 | May 1996 | November 14, 1995 | | |
| Prince of Tennis | WinkySoft | Konami | February 28, 2002 | Unreleased | Unreleased | | |
| Prince of Tennis: Sweat & Tears | Tenky | Konami | September 26, 2002 | Unreleased | Unreleased | | |
| Princess Maker: Go! Go! Princess | NineLives | NineLives | January 21, 1999 | Unreleased | Unreleased | | |
| Princess Maker: Pocket Daisakusen | NineLives | NineLives | August 13, 1998 | Unreleased | Unreleased | | |
| Princess Maker: Yumemiru Yosei | SCEI | SCEI | January 24, 1997 | Unreleased | Unreleased | | |
| Prism Court | Fujitsu | Fujitsu | February 19, 1998 | Unreleased | Unreleased | | |
| Prismaticallization | Arc System Works | Arc System Works | October 28, 1999 | Unreleased | Unreleased | | |
| Prisoner | Feycraft | Mycom | November 11, 1999 | Unreleased | Unreleased | | |
| Prisoner of Ice | Insect | Xing Entertainment | December 25, 1997 | Unreleased | Unreleased | | |
| Pro 18 World Tour Golf | Intelligent Games | Psygnosis | Unreleased | Unreleased | April 10, 1999 | | |
| Pro Backgammon •Backgammon^{JP} | Mere Mortals | Altron | January 14, 1999 | March 28, 2003 | Unreleased | | |
| Pro Bodyboarding | Theyer GFX | Midas Interactive Entertainment | Unreleased | April 12, 2002 | Unreleased | | |
| Pro Evolution Soccer | Konami Computer Entertainment Tokyo | Konami | Unreleased | February 15, 2002 | Unreleased | | |
| Pro Evolution Soccer 2^{PAL} •World Soccer Winning Eleven 2002^{JP} | Konami Computer Entertainment Tokyo | Konami | April 25, 2002 | October 25, 2002 | Unreleased | | |
| Pro Logic Mahjong Hai-Shin | Aques | Aques | January 31, 1997 | Unreleased | Unreleased | | |
| Pro Mahjong Kiwame Plus | Athena | Athena | August 30, 1996 | Unreleased | Unreleased | | |
| Pro Mahjong Kiwame Plus II | Athena | Athena | December 10, 1998 | Unreleased | Unreleased | | |
| Pro Mahjong Kiwame Tengensenhen •Pro Mahjong Kiwame Tengensenhen (Goku Series)^{JP} | Athena | Athena | October 28, 1999 | Unreleased | Unreleased | | |
| Pro Mahjong Tsuwamono 2 | Culture Brain | Culture Brain | May 13, 1999 | Unreleased | Unreleased | | |
| Pro Mahjong Tsuwamono 3 | Culture Brain | Culture Brain | May 18, 2000 | Unreleased | Unreleased | | |
| The Pro Mahjong: Menkyo Minnaten | Chat Noir | Naxat Soft | December 17, 1997 | Unreleased | Unreleased | | |
| Pro Pinball: The Web | Empire Interactive | Interplay | Unreleased | July 1996 | October 10, 1996 | | |
| Pro Pinball: Big Race USA | Empire Interactive | Cunning Developments | Unreleased | 1998 | August 10, 2000 | | |
| Pro Pinball: Fantastic Journey | Empire Interactive | Take-Two Interactive | Unreleased | March 23, 2001 | October 17, 2000 | | |
| Pro Pinball: Timeshock! | Empire Interactive | Cunning Developments | Unreleased | February 1998 | August 31, 1998 | | |
| Pro Yakyū Nettō: Puzzle Stadium | Coconuts Japan | Coconuts Japan | May 7, 1998 | Unreleased | Unreleased | | |
| Pro Wrestling Sengokuden | Dream Japan | KSS | June 27, 1997 | Unreleased | Unreleased | | |
| Pro Wrestling Sengokuden 2: Kakutou Emaki | Dream Japan | KSS | June 25, 1998 | Unreleased | Unreleased | | |
| Pro Wrestling Sengokuden: Hyper Tag Match | Dream Japan | KSS | October 23, 1997 | Unreleased | Unreleased | | |
| Pro Yakyuu Simulation Dugout '99 | DigiCube | DigiCube | October 28, 1999 | Unreleased | Unreleased | | |
| Professional Underground League of Pain | Beyond Reality | Psygnosis | Unreleased | April 1, 1997 | February 14, 1997 | | |
| Project GaiaRay | Art Co. Ltd. | Shoeisha | October 23, 1997 | Unreleased | Unreleased | | |
| Project Horned Owl | Alfa System | SCEA | December 29, 1995 | Unreleased | August 31, 1996 | | |
| Project Overkill | Konami | Konami | Unreleased | November 1996 | September 15, 1996 | | |
| Project V6 | General Entertainment | General Entertainment | February 26, 1998 | Unreleased | Unreleased | | |
| Proof Club | Yutaka | Yutaka | July 17, 1997 | Unreleased | Unreleased | | |
| Psybadek | Psygnosis | Psygnosis | Unreleased | 1998 | October 31, 1998 | | |
| Psychic Detective | Colossal Pictures | Electronic Arts | Unreleased | April 1996 | March 1, 1996 | | |
| Psychic Force | Taito | Taito^{JP}, Acclaim Entertainment^{NA/PAL} | October 4, 1996 | July 1997 | April 10, 1997 | | |
| Psychic Force 2 | Taito | Taito^{JP}, JVC Music Europe^{PAL} | October 7, 1999 | 2001 | Unreleased | | |
| Psychic Force: Puzzle Taisen | C.P. Brain | Taito | October 2, 1997 | Unreleased | Unreleased | | |
| Psychometrer Eiji | Kodansha | Kodansha | February 18, 1999 | Unreleased | Unreleased | | |
| Puchi Carat | Taito | Event Horizon Software | June 25, 1998 | 2000 | Unreleased | | |
| Pu-Li-Ru-La | Taito | Xing Entertainment | October 2, 1997 | Unreleased | Unreleased | | |
| Pukunpa: Joshikousei no Houkago... | Athena | Athena | September 27, 1996 | Unreleased | Unreleased | | |
| Puma Street Soccer | PixelStorm | SunSoft | Unreleased | May 1999 | Unreleased | | |
| Puffy: P.S. I Love You | Sony Music Entertainment | Sony Music Entertainment | March 11, 1999 | Unreleased | Unreleased | | |
| Punch the Monkey! Game Edition | KAZe | Bandai | June 22, 2000 | Unreleased | Unreleased | | |
| Punky Skunk | Visit | Jaleco | November 1, 1996 | Unreleased | February 14, 1998 | | |
| Puppet Zoo Pilomy | Human Entertainment | Human Entertainment | February 16, 1996 | Unreleased | Unreleased | | |
| Purumui Purumui | F2 Company | Culture Publishers | September 14, 1999 | Unreleased | Unreleased | | |
| Pururun! With Shape UP Girls | Graphic Research | J-Wing | January 10, 1997 | Unreleased | Unreleased | | |
| Putter Golf •Simple 1500 Series Vol. 69: The Putter Golf^{JP} | Agetec | D3 Publisher | August 30, 2001 | Unreleased | October 24, 2001 | | |
| Puyo Puyo Tsuu Ketteiban | Compile | Compile | November 15, 1996 | Unreleased | Unreleased | | |
| Puyo Puyo Box | Compile | Compile | December 21, 2000 | Unreleased | Unreleased | | |
| Puyo Puyo Sun Ketteiban | Compile | Compile | November 27, 1997 | Unreleased | Unreleased | | |
| Puyo Puyo~n | Compile | Compile | December 16, 1999 | Unreleased | Unreleased | | |
| Puzzle Arena Toshinden | Electronics Application | Takara | June 20, 1997 | Unreleased | Unreleased | | |
| Puzzle Mania | Human Entertainment | Human Entertainment | February 25, 1999 | Unreleased | Unreleased | | |
| Puzzle Mania 2 | Human Entertainment | Human Entertainment | March 25, 1999 | Unreleased | Unreleased | | |
| Starsweep •Puzzle: Star Sweep^{NA} | Axela | A1 Games^{NA}, Namco^{JP} | October 30, 1997 | Unreleased | January 15, 2001 | | |
| Puzznic | Altron | Altron^{JP}, Midas Interactive Entertainment^{PAL}, Mud Duck Productions^{NA} | March 22, 2001 | February 7, 2003 | May 15, 2003 | | |
| Q*Bert | Artech Studios | Hasbro Interactive | Unreleased | 1999 | November 12, 1999 | | |
| Qix 2000 | Success | Success | October 28, 2000 | Unreleased | Unreleased | | |
| Qix Neo •Simple 1500 Series Vol. 80: The Jintori - Volfied 1500^{JP} | Taito Corporation | Taito^{JP}, Mud Duck Productions^{NA} | December 20, 2001 | Unreleased | December 1, 2003 | | |
| The Quaddle Family Mysteries: The Case of the Scarce Scarab Garden | Lightspan | Lightspan | Unreleased | Unreleased | 1998 | | |
| The Quaddle Family Mysteries: The Case of the Scarce Scarab Lobby/Kitchen | Lightspan | Lightspan | Unreleased | Unreleased | 1998 | | |
| The Quaddle Family Mysteries: The Case of the Scarce Scarab Parlor/Family Room | Lightspan | Lightspan | Unreleased | Unreleased | 1998 | | |
| Quake II | Hammerhead | Activision | Unreleased | October 8, 1999 | September 30, 1999 | | |
| Quantum Gate I: Akumu no Joshou | Affect | Gaga | June 6, 1997 | Unreleased | Unreleased | | |
| Queens Road | Angel | Angel | March 20, 1997 | Unreleased | Unreleased | | |
| Quest for Fame | Virtual Music | SCEI | July 10, 1997 | Unreleased | Unreleased | | |
| Quiz $ Millionaire: Waku Waku Party | Hothouse Creations | Eidos Interactive | November 28, 2002 | Unreleased | Unreleased | | |
| Quiz Charaokedon! Touei Tokusatsu Hero Part 1 | Banpresto | Banpresto | July 22, 1999 | Unreleased | Unreleased | | |
| Quiz Charaokedon! Touei Tokusatsu Hero Part 2 | Banpresto | Banpresto | October 21, 1999 | Unreleased | Unreleased | | |
| Quiz Darake no Jinsei Game | OeRSTED | Takara | September 30, 1999 | Unreleased | Unreleased | | |
| Quiz Darake no Jinsei Game Dai-2-kai! | OeRSTED | Takara | October 17, 2002 | Unreleased | Unreleased | | |
| Quiz de Battle | DigiCube | DigiCube | March 14, 2002 | Unreleased | Unreleased | | |
| Quiz Master Blue | Success | Success | June 29, 2000 | Unreleased | Unreleased | | |
| Quiz Master Red | Success | Success | June 29, 2000 | Unreleased | Unreleased | | |
| Quiz Master Yellow | Success | Success | June 29, 2000 | Unreleased | Unreleased | | |
| Quiz Nanairo Dreams | Capcom | Capcom | June 27, 1997 | Unreleased | Unreleased | | |
| Quo Vadis: Iberukatsu Seneki | Glams | Glams | April 18, 1997 | Unreleased | Unreleased | | |
| R-Types | SCEA | Racdym | Unreleased | Unreleased | February 28, 1999 | | |
| R-Type Delta | Irem | Irem, Agetec | November 19, 1998 | 1999 | July 31, 1999 | | |
| R: Rock'n Riders | Pixy Corporation | FAB | April 1, 1999 | Unreleased | Unreleased | | |
| R4: Ridge Racer Type 4 | Namco | Namco | December 3, 1998 | September 1, 1999 | May 5, 1999 | P | |
| R?MJ: The Mystery Hospital | | Bandai | November 27, 1997 | Unreleased | Unreleased | | |
| Race Drivin' a Go! Go! | Time Warner Interactive | Time Warner Interactive | June 28, 1996 | Unreleased | Unreleased | | |
| Racingroovy VS | Sammy Studios | Sammy Studios | January 10, 1997 | Unreleased | Unreleased | | |
| Racing Lagoon | Square | Square | June 10, 1999 | Unreleased | Unreleased | | |
| Radikal Bikers | Gaelco | Infogrames | Unreleased | 1999 | Unreleased | | |
| Rage Racer | Namco | Namco^{JP}, Namco Hometek^{NA}, Sony Computer Entertainment^{PAL} | December 3, 1996 | June 1997 | April 30, 1997 | | |
| Rageball | NAPS team | Midas Interactive Entertainment | Unreleased | Unreleased | July 25, 2002 | | |
| Raiden DX | Seibu Kaihatsu | Nihon System | April 11, 1997 | Unreleased | Unreleased | | |
| The Raiden Project | Seibu Kaihatsu | Seibu Kaihatsu, SCEA | January 27, 1995 | November 1995 | September 9, 1995 | | |
| Railroad Tycoon II | PopTop Software | Take-Two Interactive | Unreleased | April 21, 2000 | January 31, 2000 | | |
| Rakugaki Showtime | Treasure | Enix | July 29, 1999 | Unreleased | Unreleased | | |
| Rakushiku Manabu Unten Menkyo | Vingt-et-un Systems | D3Publisher | May 2, 2001 | Unreleased | Unreleased | | |
| Rally Cross | SCEA | SCEA | July 17, 1997 | July 1997 | January 31, 1997 | | |
| Rally Cross 2 | Idol Minds | 989 Studios | Unreleased | July 20, 1999 | October 31, 1998 | | |
| Rally de Africa | Prism Arts | Prism Arts | September 23, 1998 | Unreleased | Unreleased | | |
| Rally de Europe | Prism Arts | Prism Arts | April 27, 2000 | Unreleased | Unreleased | | |
| Ramen Hashi | Tomy Corporation | Tomy Corporation | September 7, 1999 | Unreleased | Unreleased | | |
| Rampage World Tour | Game Refuge | Midway Games | Unreleased | December 1997 | September 30, 1997 | | |
| Rampage 2: Universal Tour | Avalanche Software | Midway Games | Unreleased | 1999 | March 31, 1999 | | |
| Rampage Through Time | Avalanche Software | Midway Games | Unreleased | September 29, 2000 | June 9, 2000 | | |
| Ranma ½: Battle Renaissance | Atelier Double | Shogakukan | December 6, 1996 | Unreleased | Unreleased | | |
| Rami-chan no Ōedo Sugoroku: Keiō Yūgekitai Gaiden | Victor Interactive Software | Victor Interactive Software | September 17, 1998 | Unreleased | Unreleased | | |
| Rapid Angel | Techno Soleil | Techno Soleil | August 13, 1998 | Unreleased | Unreleased | | |
| Rapid Reload | Media.Vision | SCEI | April 28, 1995 | September 29, 1995 | Unreleased | | |
| Rascal | Traveller's Tales | Phygnosis^{NA/EU}, Takara^{JP} | March 18, 1999 | March 31, 1998 | March 31, 1998 | | |
| Rascal Racers | Telegames | Telegames | Unreleased | Unreleased | March 19, 2004 | | |
| Rat Attack! | Pure Entertainment | Mindscape | Unreleased | October 15, 1999 | August 31, 1999 | | |
| The Raven Project | Cryo Interactive | Cryo Interactive | Unreleased | March 25, 1997 | Unreleased | | |
| RayCrisis: Series Termination | Taito Corporation | Working Designs | Unreleased | Unreleased | October 25, 2000 | | |
| Ray Tracers | Taito | Taito^{JP}, THQ^{NA}, Sony Computer Entertainment^{PAL} | January 17, 1997 | September 1997 | December 31, 1997 | | |
| Rayman | Ubi Pictures | Ubi Soft | September 22, 1995 | September 1995 | September 7, 1995 | P | |
| Rayman 2: The Great Escape | Ubi Pictures | Ubi Soft | Unreleased | September 8, 2000 | September 15, 2000 | P | |
| Rayman Junior: English | Aqua Pacific | Ubi Soft | Unreleased | November 10, 2000 | Unreleased | | |
| Rayman Junior Level 1 | Aqua Pacific | Ubi Soft | Unreleased | December 15, 2000 | Unreleased | | |
| Rayman Junior Level 2 | Aqua Pacific | Ubi Soft | Unreleased | December 15, 2000 | Unreleased | | |
| Rayman Junior Level 3 | Aqua Pacific | Ubi Soft | Unreleased | January 12, 2001 | Unreleased | | |
| Rayman Rush | Ubi Soft Shanghai | Ubi Soft | Unreleased | March 8, 2002 | March 26, 2002 | | |
| RayStorm | Taito | Taito^{JP}, Working Designs^{NA}, Sony Computer Entertainment^{PAL} | January 10, 1997 | September 1997 | September 15, 1997 | | |
| Razor Freestyle Scooter | Shaba Games | Crave Entertainment^{NA}, Ubi Soft^{PAL} | Unreleased | March 31, 2001 | December 11, 2000 | | |
| Razor Racing •Scooter Racing^{PAL} | Vision Scape | Crave Entertainment^{NA}, Ubi Soft^{PAL} | Unreleased | March 15, 2002 | November 1, 2001 | | |
| RC de Go! •Simple 1500 Series Vol. 68: The RC Car^{JP} | Taito | Taito^{JP}, Acclaim Entertainment^{NA/PAL} | July 6, 2000 | October 13, 2000 | November 9, 2000 | | |
| RC Helicopter^{NA} •Simple 1500 Series Vol. 53: The Helicopter^{JP} | D's Garage 21 | D3 Publisher^{JP}, A1 Games^{NA} | December 14, 2000 | Unreleased | June 1, 2002 | | |
| RC Revenge | Acclaim Studios Cheltenham | Acclaim Entertainment | Unreleased | Unreleased | August 16, 2000 | | |
| R/C Stunt Copter | Big Grub, Shiny Entertainment | Titus Interactive^{NA}, Interplay Entertainment^{PAL} | Unreleased | Unreleased | July 31, 1999 | | |
| Re-Volt | Acclaim Studios London | Acclaim Entertainment | January 6, 2000 | September 3, 1999 | August 18, 1999 | | |
| Reach Mahjong | Pony Canyon | Pony Canyon | December 14, 2000 | Unreleased | Unreleased | | |
| Ready 2 Rumble Boxing | Point of View | Midway Games | Unreleased | 1999 | October 31, 1999 | | |
| Ready 2 Rumble Boxing: Round 2 | Point of View | Midway Games | Unreleased | December 1, 2000 | November 9, 2000 | | |
| Ready Maid | Zero System | PrincessSoft | October 24, 2002 | Unreleased | Unreleased | | |
| Real Bout Garou Densetsu | SNK | SNK | January 10, 1997 | Unreleased | Unreleased | | |
| Real Bout Garou Densetsu Special: Dominated Mind | SNK | SNK | June 25, 1998 | Unreleased | Unreleased | | |
| Real Robot Battle Line | WinkySoft | Banpresto | August 12, 1999 | Unreleased | Unreleased | | |
| Real Robots Final Attack | Banpresto | Banpresto | January 8, 1998 | Unreleased | Unreleased | | |
| ReBoot | Electronic Arts | Electronic Arts | Unreleased | 1998 | February 28, 1998 | | |
| Red Asphalt •Rock & Roll Racing 2: Red Asphalt^{PAL} | Interplay | Interplay | Unreleased | December 1997 | January 10, 1998 | | |
| Reel Fishing | Victor Interactive Software | Victor Interactive Software^{JP}, Natsume Inc.^{NA/PAL} | October 10, 1996 | 1998 | March 31, 1998 | | |
| Reel Fishing II | Victor Interactive Software | Victor Interactive Software^{JP}, Natsume Inc.^{NA/PAL} | January 27, 2000 | October 6, 2000 | June 14, 2000 | | |
| Refrain Love: Anata ni Aitai | Riverhillsoft | Riverhillsoft | March 14, 1997 | Unreleased | Unreleased | | |
| Refrain Love 2 | Riverhillsoft | Riverhillsoft | January 28, 1999 | Unreleased | Unreleased | | |
| Reikoku: Ikeda Kizoku Shinrei Kenkyuujo | Infinity | Media Factory | October 26, 2000 | Unreleased | Unreleased | | |
| Re-Loaded | Gremlin Interactive | Interplay Entertainment | Unreleased | December 6, 1996 | November 30, 1996 | | |
| Remote Control Dandy | Human Entertainment | Human Entertainment | July 22, 1999 | Unreleased | Unreleased | | |
| Renai Kouhosei: Starlight Scramble | Wizard | KSS | September 23, 1998 | Unreleased | Unreleased | | |
| Renai Kouza Real Age | Imagineer | Imagineer | June 24, 1999 | Unreleased | Unreleased | | |
| Renegade Racers | Interplay | Interplay | Unreleased | Unreleased | March 9, 2000 | | |
| Rescue 24 Hours | CS | CS | March 14, 1997 | Unreleased | Unreleased | | |
| Rescue Copter | Conspiracy Entertainment | Conspiracy Entertainment | Unreleased | Unreleased | December 8, 2002 | | |
| Rescue Heroes: Molten Menace | Runecraft | Knowledge Adventure^{NA}, Vivendi Universal Interactive Publishing^{EU} | Unreleased | 2001 | September 24, 2001 | | |
| Rescue Shot^{PAL} Rescue Shot Bubibo^{JP} | Now Production | Namco^{JP}, Namco Hometek^{NA} | January 20, 2000 | May 6, 2000 | Unreleased | | |
| Resident Evil •Bio Hazard^{JP} | Capcom | Capcom^{JP/NA}, Virgin Interactive Entertainment^{EU} | March 22, 1996 | August 1, 1996 | March 30, 1996 | P | |
| Resident Evil: Director's Cut (Note: update for Resident Evil.) •Resident Evil: Director's Cut Dual Shock Ver.^{US,EU} •Biohazard Director's Cut^{JP} •Biohazard Director's Cut Dual Shock Ver.^{JP} | Capcom | Capcom^{JP/NA}, Virgin Interactive Entertainment^{EU} | September 25, 1997 | December 10, 1997 | September 30, 1997 | | |
| Resident Evil 2 •Resident Evil 2: Dual Shock Ver.^{US,EU} •Biohazard 2^{JP} •Biohazard 2: Dual Shock Ver.^{JP} | Capcom | Capcom^{JP/NA}, Virgin Interactive Entertainment^{EU} | January 29, 1998 | May 8, 1998 | January 21, 1998 | P | |
| Resident Evil 3: Nemesis •Biohazard 3: Last Escape^{JP} | Capcom | Capcom^{JP/NA}, Eidos Interactive^{EU} | September 22, 1999 | March 17, 2000 | November 10, 1999 | | |
| Resident Evil Survivor •Biohazard Gun Survivor^{JP} | Capcom | Capcom^{JP/NA}, Eidos Interactive^{EU} | January 27, 2000 | March 31, 2000 | August 30, 2000 | | |
| Restaurant Dream | Siesta | Teichiku Records | July 1, 1999 | Unreleased | Unreleased | | |
| Retro Force | Psygnosis | Psygnosis | Unreleased | May 1999 | Unreleased | | |
| Return Fire | Silent Software Inc | Time Warner Interactive | Unreleased | September 1996 | April 12, 1996 | | |
| Return to Zork | Activision | Bandai Visual (Emotion Digital Software) | September 27, 1996 | Unreleased | Unreleased | | |
| Reversi | ProSoft | Selen | January 24, 2002 | Unreleased | Unreleased | | |
| Reversi II | Success | Success | August 26, 1999 | Unreleased | Unreleased | | |
| Reverthion | TechnoSoft | TechnoSoft | December 1, 1995 | Unreleased | Unreleased | | |
| Revolution X | Software Creations | Acclaim | March 1, 1996 | April 1996 | January 4, 1996 | | |
| Rhapsody: A Musical Adventure •The Puppet Princess of Marl Kingdom^{JP} | Nippon Ichi Software | Atlus^{NA}, Nippon Ichi Software^{JP} | December 17, 1998 | Unreleased | July 30, 2000 | | |
| Rhythm 'n' Face | OutSide Directors Company | Asmik Ace Entertainment, Inc | March 9, 2000 | Unreleased | Unreleased | | |
| Rhythm Beat | Phoenix Games | Phoenix Games | Unreleased | 2004 | Unreleased | | |
| Ridge Racer | Namco | Namco^{JP}, Namco Hometek^{NA}, Sony Computer Entertainment^{PAL} | December 3, 1994 | September 29, 1995 | September 9, 1995 | P | |
| Ridge Racer Revolution | Namco | Namco^{JP}, Namco Hometek^{NA}, Sony Computer Entertainment^{PAL} | December 3, 1995 | May 17, 1996 | September 30, 1996 | P | |
| Rikujou Boueitai Mao-chan | Marvelous Inc. | Marvelous Inc. | January 23, 2003 | Unreleased | Unreleased | | |
| Ring of Sias | Athena | Athena | April 12, 1996 | Unreleased | Unreleased | | |
| Riot Stars | Hect | Hect | May 2, 1997 | Unreleased | Unreleased | | |
| Rise 2: Resurrection | Mirage | Acclaim Entertainment | September 13, 1996 | June 1996 | March 6, 1996 | | |
| Rising Zan: The Samurai Gunman | UEP Systems | Agetec Inc. | March 25, 1999 | Unreleased | September 30, 1999 | | |
| Risk | Runecraft | Hasbro Interactive | Unreleased | 1997 | May 31, 1998 | | |
| Rival Schools | Capcom | Capcom^{JP/NA}, Virgin Interactive Entertainment^{PAL} | July 30, 1998 | 1998 | September 30, 1998 | | |
| Riven: The Sequel to Myst | Sunsoft | Acclaim Entertainment | Unreleased | February 1998 | November 30, 1997 | | |
| Road Rage •Speed King^{JP} | Konami | Konami | December 13, 1996 | January 8, 1997 | Unreleased | | |
| Road Rash | Apple Advanced Technology Group | Electronic Arts | March 22, 1996 | March 1996 | December 29, 1995 | P | |
| Road Rash 3D | Electronic Arts | Electronic Arts | Unreleased | Unreleased | May 31, 1998 | | |
| Road Rash: Jailbreak | EA Redwood Shores | Electronic Arts | Unreleased | Unreleased | January 26, 2000 | | |
| Road & Track Presents: The Need for Speed •Road & Track Presents: Over Drivin' DX^{JP} | EA Canada | Electronic Arts, Electronic Arts Victor^{JP} | April 19, 1996 | March 20, 1996 | March 20, 1996 | | |
| Roadsters | Smart Dog | Titus Interactive | Unreleased | Unreleased | March 21, 2000 | | |
| Road Writer | Lightspan | Lightspan | Unreleased | Unreleased | 1999 | | |
| Robbit Mon Dieu | Sugar and Rockets | Sony Computer Entertainment | October 14, 1999 | Unreleased | Unreleased | | |
| Robin Hood: The Siege | Ivolgamus | Phoenix Games | Unreleased | March 2, 2004 | Unreleased | | |
| Robin Lloyd no Bouken | Gust | Gust | January 6, 2000 | Unreleased | Unreleased | | |
| Robo Pit | Altron | Kokopeli Digital Studios | January 13, 1996 | October 1996 | July 10, 1996 | | |
| Robo Pit 2 | Altron | SCEI | August 21, 1997 | June 27, 2003 | August 30, 2003 | | |
| Robot X Robot | Nemesys | Nemesys | October 14, 1999 | Unreleased | Unreleased | | |
| Robotron X | Midway | Midway | Unreleased | March 1997 | November 30, 1996 | | |
| Rock 'Em Sock 'Em Robots Arena | Paradox Development | Mattel Interactive | Unreleased | Unreleased | December 4, 2000 | | |
| Rocket Power: Team Rocket Rescue | Darkblack | THQ | Unreleased | Unreleased | September 4, 2001 | | |
| Rockman | Capcom | Capcom | August 5, 1999 | Unreleased | Unreleased | | |
| Rockman 2 | Capcom | Capcom | September 2, 1999 | Unreleased | Unreleased | | |
| Rockman 3 | Capcom | Capcom | September 14, 1999 | Unreleased | Unreleased | | |
| Rockman 4 | Capcom | Capcom | October 28, 1999 | Unreleased | Unreleased | | |
| Rockman 5 | Capcom | Capcom | November 25, 1999 | Unreleased | Unreleased | | |
| Rockman 6 | Capcom | Capcom | December 9, 1999 | Unreleased | Unreleased | | |
| Rogue Trip: Vacation 2012 | SingleTrac | GT Interactive | Unreleased | November 30, 1998 | September 30, 1998 | | |
| Roland Garros French Open 2001 | Carapace | Cryo Interactive | Unreleased | June 1, 2001 | Unreleased | | |
| Rollcage | Attention to Detail | Psygnosis | Unreleased | March 1999 | March 31, 1999 | | |
| Rollcage Stage II | Attention to Detail | Midway | Unreleased | March 8, 2000 | October 10, 2000 | | |
| Romance of the Three Kingdoms IV: Wall of Fire •SanGokuShi IV with Power-Up Kit^{JP} | Koei | Koei | September 29, 1995 | Unreleased | March 10, 1996 | | |
| Romance of the Three Kingdoms VI: Awakening of the Dragon •SanGokuShi VI with Power-Up Kit^{JP} | Koei | Koei | October 8, 1998 | Unreleased | March 31, 2000 | | |
| Romance wa Ken no Kagayaki II | Kadokawa | Kadokawa | September 19, 2002 | Unreleased | Unreleased | | |
| Ronaldo V-Football | Power and Magic Development | Infogrames | Unreleased | May 20, 2000 | Unreleased | | |
| The RonRon | SunSoft | SunSoft | May 2, 2000 | Unreleased | Unreleased | | |
| Roommate: Inoue Ryoko | Fupac | Datam Polystar | July 29, 1999 | Unreleased | Unreleased | | |
| Rosco McQueen Firefighter Extreme •Fire Panic^{JP} | Psygnosis | Psygnosis | Unreleased | Unreleased | August 31, 1998 | | |
| Roswell Conspiracies: Aliens, Myths and Legends | Red Lemon Studios | Red Storm Entertainment^{NA}, Ubi Soft^{PAL} | Unreleased | Unreleased | June 14, 2001 | | |
| Rox | Altron | Altron | October 22, 1998 | May 1, 2003 | Unreleased | | |
| RPG Maker | Kuusou Kagaku | Agetec | November 27, 1997 | Unreleased | September 19, 2000 | | |
| RPG Tsukuru 4 | Agenda | Enterbrain | December 7, 2000 | Unreleased | Unreleased | | |
| RTL Ski Jumping 2002 | VCC Entertainment | THQ | Unreleased | November 23, 2001 | Unreleased | | |
| Rubbish Blazon | Pandora Box | Pandora Box | April 27, 2000 | Unreleased | Unreleased | | |
| Rugrats: Search for Reptar | n-space | THQ | Unreleased | November 1998 | October 31, 1998 | | |
| Rugrats in Paris: The Movie | Avalanche Software | THQ | Unreleased | Unreleased | October 29, 2000 | P | |
| Rugrats: Studio Tour | n-Space | THQ | Unreleased | December 15, 1999 | November 10, 1999 | | |
| Rugrats: Totally Angelica | Art Co., Ltd | THQ | Unreleased | June 29, 2001 | April 13, 2001 | | |
| Rune no Joka: Hikari to Yamo no Sei-oujo | MediaWorks | Takara | April 25, 1997 | Unreleased | Unreleased | | |
| Runabout 2 | Graphic Research | Hot-B | Unreleased | Unreleased | May 19, 2000 | | |
| Rung Rung: Oz no Mahou Tsukai - Another World | Affect | Affect | June 15, 2000 | Unreleased | Unreleased | | |
| Running High | System Sacom | Rex Entertainment | April 25, 1997 | Unreleased | Unreleased | | |
| Running Wild | Blue Shift | 989 Studios^{NA}, Sony Computer Entertainment^{PAL} | Unreleased | Unreleased | September 30, 1998 | | |
| Rurouni Kenshin: Meiji Kenkaku Romantan: Ishin Gekitōhen | ZOOM Inc. | | November 29, 1996 | Unreleased | Unreleased | | |
| Rurouni Kenshin: Meiji Kenyaku Romantan: Juuyuushi Inbou Hen | | | December 18, 1997 | Unreleased | Unreleased | | |
| Rush Hour •Speedster^{PAL} •BattleRound USA^{JP} | Clockwork Games | Psygnosis | April 29, 1998 | May 1, 1997 | April 30, 1997 | | |
| Rushdown | Canal+ Multimedia | Canal+ Multimedia^{PAL}, Electronic Arts^{NA} | Unreleased | Unreleased | February 28, 1999 | | |
| Ryuki Densyo: Dragoon | KSS | KSS | December 18, 1997 | Unreleased | Unreleased | | |
| S.C.A.R.S. | Vivid Image | Ubis Soft | Unreleased | September 1998 | August 31, 1998 | | |
| Saban's Iznogoud | Microids | Microids | Unreleased | June 1998 | Unreleased | | |
| Sabre Marionette J: Battle Sabres | Tom Create | Bandai Visual | March 28, 1997 | Unreleased | Unreleased | | |
| Sabrina the Teenage Witch: A Twitch in Time! | Knowledge Adventure Inc. | Simon & Schuster | Unreleased | July 27, 2001 | March 30, 2001 | | |
| SaGa Frontier | Square | Square^{JP}, Sony Computer Entertainment^{NA} | July 11, 1997 | Unreleased | March 31, 1998 | | |
| SaGa Frontier 2 | Square | Square^{JP/EU}, Square Electronic Arts^{NA} | April 1, 1999 | March 22, 2000 | January 31, 2000 | | |
| Saibara Rieko no Mahjong Toriadama Kikou | Media Rings | Media Rings | February 24, 2000 | Unreleased | Unreleased | | |
| Saikyo Todai Shogi | Mycom | Mycom | December 3, 1998 | Unreleased | Unreleased | | |
| Saikyo Todai Shogi 2 | Mycom | Mycom | November 18, 1999 | Unreleased | Unreleased | | |
| Saikyou Ginsei Chess | SilverStar | I'Max | October 24, 2002 | Unreleased | Unreleased | | |
| Saikyou Ginsei Mahjong | SilverStar | I.Magic | August 29, 2002 | Unreleased | Unreleased | | |
| Saikyou Ginsei Shogi 2 | SilverStar | I'Max | October 24, 2002 | Unreleased | Unreleased | | |
| Saikyou no Igo: The Strongest Game of Go | Oxford Softworks | Itochu | December 1, 1998 | Unreleased | Unreleased | | |
| Saikyou no Shogi | Oxford Softworks | Unbalance | June 3, 1999 | Unreleased | Unreleased | | |
| Saishuu Densha | Visit | Visit | February 26, 1998 | Unreleased | Unreleased | | |
| Saiyuki: Journey West | Koei | Sony Computer Entertainment | November 11, 1999 | Unreleased | August 13, 2001 | | |
| Sakamoto Ryuma: Ishin Kaikoku | KID | KID | December 11, 1997 | Unreleased | Unreleased | | |
| Sakigake!! Otokojuku: The Dodge Ball | Access | Bandai | August 29, 2002 | Unreleased | Unreleased | | |
| Sakumashiki Jinsei Game | Takara | Takara | December 10, 1998 | Unreleased | Unreleased | | |
| Salamander Deluxe Pack Plus | Konami | Konami | July 3, 1997 | Unreleased | Unreleased | | |
| Salary Man Champ: Tatakau Salary Man | Success | Visit | May 31, 2001 | Unreleased | Unreleased | | |
| Salary Man Kintaro: The Game | | Bandai | June 22, 2000 | Unreleased | Unreleased | | |
| Salary Man Settai Mahjong | Visit | Visit | May 10, 2001 | Unreleased | Unreleased | | |
| Saltwater Sportfishing | Take-Two Interactive | Coresoft | Unreleased | Unreleased | November 28, 2001 | | |
| Salzburg no Majo: The Witch of Salzburg | System Sacom | T_Dogs | June 20, 1997 | Unreleased | Unreleased | | |
| Sammy Sosa High Heat Baseball 2001 | Team .366 | The 3DO Company | Unreleased | Unreleased | February 29, 2000 | | |
| Sammy Sosa Softball Slam | The 3DO Company | The 3DO Company | Unreleased | Unreleased | February 29, 2000 | | |
| Sampras Extreme Tennis | Codemasters | Virgin Interactive Entertainment | January 10, 1997 | November 1996 | Unreleased | | |
| Samurai Deeper Kyo | | Bandai | December 12, 2002 | Unreleased | Unreleased | | |
| Samurai Shodown III: Blades of Blood •Samurai Spirits: Zankuro Musouken^{JP} | SNK | SNK | August 30, 1996 | 1996 | November 30, 1996 | | |
| Samurai Shodown IV: Amakusa's Revenge •Samurai Spirits: Amakusa's Descent^{JP} | SNK | SNK | December 25, 1997 | Unreleased | Unreleased | | |
| Samurai Shodown: Warrior's Rage •Samurai Spirits: Warrior's Rage 2^{JP} | SNK | SNK | December 22, 1999 | Unreleased | April 18, 2000 | | |
| Samurai Spirits Kenkaku Yubinan Pack | SNK | SNK | March 26, 1998 | Unreleased | Unreleased | | |
| San Francisco Rush: Extreme Racing | Climax Group | Midway | Unreleased | April 2, 1998 | February 28, 1998 | | |
| Sangokushi II | Koei | Koei | September 23, 1998 | Unreleased | Unreleased | | |
| Sangokushi III | Koei | Koei | February 22, 2001 | Unreleased | Unreleased | | |
| Sangokushi V •SanGokuShi V with Power-Up Kit^{JP} | Koei | Koei | February 14, 1997 | Unreleased | Unreleased | | |
| SanGokuShi VII | Koei | Koei | February 1, 2001 | Unreleased | Unreleased | | |
| Sangokushi Returns | Koei | Koei | March 20, 1997 | Unreleased | Unreleased | | |
| SanGokushi: Eiketsuden | Koei | Koei | March 29, 1996 | Unreleased | Unreleased | | |
| SanGokuShi: Koumeiden | Koei | Koei | February 14, 1997 | Unreleased | Unreleased | | |
| Sankyo Fever Vol. 2: Jikki Simulation | Vistec | TEN | October 25, 1997 | Unreleased | Unreleased | | |
| Sankyo Fever Vol. 3: Jikki Simulation | Vistec | TEN | May 28, 1998 | Unreleased | Unreleased | | |
| Sankyo Fever: Downtown Geki | Vistec | TEN | July 5, 1996 | Unreleased | Unreleased | | |
| Sankyo Fever: Jikki Simulation | Vistec | TEN | March 8, 1996 | Unreleased | Unreleased | | |
| Santa Claus Saves the Earth | Ivolgamus | Telegames | Unreleased | November 29, 2002 | Unreleased | | |
| Sanyo Pachinko Paradise | Irem | Irem | July 29, 1999 | Unreleased | Unreleased | | |
| Sanyo Pachinko Paradise 2: Umi Monogatari Special | Irem | Irem | November 18, 1999 | Unreleased | Unreleased | | |
| Sanyo Pachinko Paradise 3 | Irem | Irem | March 9, 2000 | Unreleased | Unreleased | | |
| Sanyo Pachinko Paradise 4 | Irem | Irem | October 12, 2000 | Unreleased | Unreleased | | |
| Sanyo Pachinko Paradise 5 | Irem | Irem | May 10, 2001 | Unreleased | Unreleased | | |
| Saraba Uchuu Senkan Yamato: Ai no Senshi Tachi | Bec | Bandai | May 2, 2000 | Unreleased | Unreleased | | |
| SatelliTV | Nippon Ichi Software | Nippon Ichi Software | January 8, 1998 | Unreleased | Unreleased | | |
| Satomi no Nazo | Sound Technology | Sound Technology | November 6, 1997 | Unreleased | Unreleased | | |
| Schnappi das kleine Krokodil – 3 Fun-Games | Sproing Interactive Media | Phenomedia | Unreleased | March 1, 2005^{DE} | Unreleased | | |
| Schrodinger no Neko | Dual | Takara | May 30, 1997 | Unreleased | Unreleased | | |
| Scooby-Doo and the Cyber Chase | Art Co., Ltd | THQ | Unreleased | October 4, 2001 | December 7, 2001 | | |
| Scrabble | Runecraft | Hasbro Interactive^{NA}, Ubi Soft^{PAL} | Unreleased | 2001 | October 31, 1999 | | |
| Screen | KID | Electronic Arts Square | May 25, 2000 | Unreleased | Unreleased | | |
| SD Gundam Eiyuden: Daikessen!! Shiki vs Musha | Bec | Bandai | March 1, 2001 | Unreleased | Unreleased | | |
| SD Gundam: G Century | Japan Art Media | Bandai | March 20, 1997 | Unreleased | Unreleased | | |
| SD Gundam G Generation | | Bandai | August 6, 1998 | Unreleased | Unreleased | | |
| SD Gundam G Generation-F | | Bandai | August 3, 2000 | Unreleased | Unreleased | | |
| SD Gundam G Generation F.I.F. (Note: expansion for SD Gundam G Generation F.) | | Bandai | May 2, 2001 | Unreleased | Unreleased | | |
| SD Gundam G Generation Zero | | Bandai | August 12, 1999 | Unreleased | Unreleased | | |
| SD Gundam: Over Galaxian | Lay-Up | Bandai | June 28, 1996 | Unreleased | Unreleased | | |
| Sea-Doo Hydrocross | Vicarious Visions | Vatical Entertainment | Unreleased | Unreleased | June 4, 2001 | | |
| SeaBass Fishing | A-Wave | Victor Interactive Software | June 21, 1996 | Unreleased | Unreleased | | |
| SeaBass Fishing 2 | A-Wave | Victor Interactive Software | September 25, 1997 | Unreleased | Unreleased | | |
| The Secret of Googol: Eggs All Around | Lightspan | Lightspan | Unreleased | Unreleased | 1997 | | |
| The Secret of Googol: Googol Gulch - General Store, Math Arcade | Lightspan | Lightspan | Unreleased | Unreleased | 1997 | | |
| The Secret of Googol: Googolfest - Arcade Isle, Moon Feast Isle | Lightspan | Lightspan | Unreleased | Unreleased | 1997 | | |
| The Secret of Googol: Googolfest - Party Isle, Toy Isle | Lightspan | Lightspan | Unreleased | Unreleased | 1997 | | |
| The Secret of Googol: Reshaping Googol - Castle | Lightspan | Lightspan | Unreleased | Unreleased | 1997 | | |
| The Secret of Googol: Reshaping Googol - The Submarine | Lightspan | Lightspan | Unreleased | Unreleased | 1997 | | |
| The Secret of Googol: Reshaping Googol - The Tower | Lightspan | Lightspan | Unreleased | Unreleased | 1997 | | |
| The Secret of Googol: Reshaping Googol - Under the Ocean | Lightspan | Lightspan | Unreleased | Unreleased | 1997 | | |
| The Secret of Googol: The Googol Counting Fair - Corral, Fun House | Lightspan | Lightspan | Unreleased | Unreleased | 1997 | | |
| The Secret of Googol: The Googol Counting Fair - Midways | Lightspan | Lightspan | Unreleased | Unreleased | 1997 | | |
| Segare Ijiri | Enix | Enix | June 3, 1999 | Unreleased | Unreleased | | |
| Seikai no Monshō | | Bandai | May 25, 2000 | Unreleased | Unreleased | | |
| Seikoku 1092: Souheiden | Yutaka | Yutaka | November 6, 1997 | Unreleased | Unreleased | | |
| Seirei Hata RayBlade | Winkysoft | Winkysoft | March 23, 2000 | Unreleased | Unreleased | | |
| Seirei Shoukan: Princess of Darkness | Shoeisha | Shoeisha | June 25, 1998 | Unreleased | Unreleased | | |
| Seishoujo Kantai Virgin Fleet | Konami | Konami | July 1, 1999 | Unreleased | Unreleased | | |
| Sekai Saikyou Ginsei Igo | I.Magic | I.Magic | November 29, 2001 | Unreleased | Unreleased | | |
| Sekai Saikyou Ginsei Igo 2 | I.Magic | I.Magic | March 21, 2003 | Unreleased | Unreleased | | |
| Sekai Saikyou Ginsei Igo 3 | I'Max | I'Max | October 23, 2003 | Unreleased | Unreleased | | |
| Sekai Saikyou Ginsei Shogi | I'Max | I'Max | November 29, 2001 | Unreleased | Unreleased | | |
| Sengoku Cyber: Fujimaru Jigokuhen | Pandora Box | SCEI | October 27, 1995 | Unreleased | Unreleased | | |
| Sengoku Mugen | Alpha Unit | Banpresto | May 31, 2001 | Unreleased | Unreleased | | |
| Senkai Taisen: TV Animation Senkaiden Fuukami Engiyori | Opera House | Bandai | June 29, 2000 | Unreleased | Unreleased | | |
| Senkai Tsuuroku Seishi | Opera House | Bandai | March 29, 2001 | Unreleased | Unreleased | | |
| Senran | Angel | Angel | August 23, 1996 | Unreleased | Unreleased | | |
| Senryaku Shidan: Tora! Tora! Tora! Rikusenhen | Nexus Interact | Dazz | February 24, 2000 | Unreleased | Unreleased | | |
| Senryaku Shogi | Electronic Arts Victor | Electronic Arts Victor | November 17, 1995 | Unreleased | Unreleased | | |
| Sensible Soccer | Krisalis Software | GT Interactive | Unreleased | 1998 | Unreleased | | |
| Sentient | Psygnosis | Psygnosis | Unreleased | July 1, 1997 | March 31, 1997 | | |
| Sentimental Graffiti | NEC Interchannel | NEC Interchannel | March 29, 2001 | Unreleased | Unreleased | | |
| Sentimental Journey | Banpresto | Banpresto | September 23, 1998 | Unreleased | Unreleased | | |
| Sentinel Returns | Hookstone | Psygnosis | Unreleased | July 1998 | August 31, 1998 | | |
| Sentou Kokka Kai Improved (Note: update for Sentou Kokka: Air Land Battle.) | Marionette | SCEI | April 11, 1997 | Unreleased | Unreleased | | |
| Sentou Kokka: Air Land Battle | Marionette | SCEI | December 1, 1995 | Unreleased | Unreleased | | |
| Sentou Mecha Xabungle: The Racing Action | Access | Bandai | April 3, 2003 | Unreleased | Unreleased | | |
| Septentrion: Out of the Blue | Human Entertainment | Human Entertainment | March 11, 1999 | Unreleased | Unreleased | | |
| Serial Experiments Lain (video game) | Pioneer LDC | Pioneer LDC | November 26, 1998 | Unreleased | Unreleased | | |
| Serofans | NineLives | NineLives | December 11, 1997 | Unreleased | Unreleased | | |
| Sesame Street Sports | Realtime Associates | NewKidCo^{NA}, Ubi Soft^{PAL} | Unreleased | Unreleased | October 31, 2001 | | |
| Sesame Street: Elmo's Letter Adventure | Realtime Associates | NewKidCo^{NA}, Ubi Soft^{PAL} | Unreleased | Unreleased | October 16, 1998 | | |
| Sesame Street: Elmo's Number Journey | Realtime Associates | NewKidCo^{NA}, Ubi Soft^{PAL} | Unreleased | Unreleased | October 16, 1998 | | |
| Sexy Parodius | Konami | Konami | November 1, 1996 | Unreleased | Unreleased | | |
| Shachou Eiyuuden: The Eagle Shooting Heroes | SCEI | SCEI | November 30, 2000 | Unreleased | Unreleased | | |
| Shadow and Shadow | Kero Q | PrincessSoft | February 28, 2002 | Unreleased | Unreleased | | |
| Shadow Gunner: The Robot Wars | Vertex Multimedia | Ubi Soft | Unreleased | October 1998 | Unreleased | | |
| Shadow Madness | Crave Entertainment | Crave Entertainment | Unreleased | February 25, 2000 | April 30, 1999 | | |
| Shadow Man | Acclaim Studios Teesside | Acclaim Entertainment | Unreleased | 1999 | September 30, 1999 | | |
| Shadow Master | Hammerhead | Psygnosis | Unreleased | Unreleased | December 31, 1997 | | |
| Shadow Tower | FromSoftware | Agetec | October 31, 1999 | Unreleased | November 19, 1999 | | |
| Shake Kids | On Demand | On Demand | July 16, 1998 | Unreleased | Unreleased | | |
| Shaman King: Spirit of Shamans | Dimps | Bandai | June 6, 2002 | Unreleased | Unreleased | | |
| Shanghai: Banri no Choujou | SCEI | SCEI | March 24, 1995 | Unreleased | Unreleased | | |
| Shanghai: Dynasty | Success | Success | March 22, 2001 | Unreleased | Unreleased | | |
| Shanghai: Great Moments | Activision | Sunsoft | January 17, 1997 | Unreleased | Unreleased | | |
| Shanghai: Shouryuu Sairin | Taito | Taito | June 7, 2001 | Unreleased | Unreleased | | |
| Shanghai: True Valor | Sunsoft | Sunsoft | September 23, 1998 | Unreleased | May 31, 1999 | | |
| ShaoLin •Lord of Fist^{JP} | Polygon Magic | ^{JP}MediaWorks, ^{PAL}THQ | August 26, 1999 | March 31, 2000 | Unreleased | | |
| Sheep | Minds-Eye Productions | Empire Interactive^{PAL,NA}, Syscom^{JP} | June 14, 2001 | November 17, 2000 | November 6, 2000 | | |
| Sheep, Dog, 'n' Wolf •Looney Tunes: Sheep Raider^{NA} | Infogrames Lyon House | Infogrames | Unreleased | September 14, 2001 | September 27, 2001 | P | |
| Shellshock | U.S. Gold | Core Design | October 25, 1996 | April 19, 1996 | June 30, 1996 | | |
| Shibasu 1-2-3 Destiny! | Jaleco | Jaleco | January 6, 2000 | Unreleased | Unreleased | | |
| Shichida Shiki Unou de Asoventure: Katachi 123 0~2-Sai Muke | Success | Succes | September 21, 2000 | Unreleased | Unreleased | | |
| Shichida Shiki Unou de Asoventure: Katachi 123 2~4-Sai Muke | Success | Succes | September 21, 2000 | Unreleased | Unreleased | | |
| Shichida Shiki Unou de Asoventure: Katachi 123 4~6-Sai Muke | Success | Succes | September 21, 2000 | Unreleased | Unreleased | | |
| Shichida Shiki Unou de Asoventure: Kotoba ABC 0~2-Sai Muke | Success | Succes | September 21, 2000 | Unreleased | Unreleased | | |
| Shichida Shiki Unou de Asoventure: Kotoba ABC 2~4-Sai Muke | Success | Succes | September 21, 2000 | Unreleased | Unreleased | | |
| Shichida Shiki Unou de Asoventure: Kotoba ABC 4~6-Sai Muke | Success | Succes | September 21, 2000 | Unreleased | Unreleased | | |
| Shichisei Toushin Guyferd: Crown Kaimetsu Sakusen | Capcom | Capcom | November 19, 1998 | Unreleased | Unreleased | | |
| Shiki Oriori no Bass Tsuri | Visit | Visit | June 15, 2000 | Unreleased | Unreleased | | |
| Shin DX Okuman Chouja Game: Tsukutte! Utte! Oumouke! | Takara | Takara | June 19, 2003 | Unreleased | Unreleased | | |
| Shin Fortune Quest: Sokutaku no Kishi-tachi | MediaWorks | MediaWorks | June 21, 1996 | Unreleased | Unreleased | | |
| Shin Masou Kishin: Panzer Warfare | Banpresto | Banpresto | November 25, 1999 | Unreleased | Unreleased | | |
| Shin Megami Tensei | Atlus | Atlus | May 31, 2001 | Unreleased | Unreleased | | |
| Shin Megami Tensei II | Atlus | Atlus | March 20, 2002 | Unreleased | Unreleased | | |
| Shin Megami Tensei If... | Atlus | Atlus | December 26, 2002 | Unreleased | Unreleased | | |
| Shin Megami Tensei: Devil Children - Black Book / Red Book | Atlus | Atlus | March 28, 2002 | Unreleased | Unreleased | | |
| Shin Megami Tensei: Devil Summoner: Soul Hackers | Atlus | Atlus | April 8, 1999 | Unreleased | Unreleased | | |
| Shin Nippon Pro Wrestling: Toukon Retsuden | Yuke's | Tomy | September 29, 1995 | Unreleased | Unreleased | | |
| Shin Nippon Pro Wrestling: Toukon Retsuden 2 | Yuke's | Tomy | December 20, 1996 | Unreleased | Unreleased | | |
| Shin Nippon Pro Wrestling: Toukon Retsuden 3 | Yuke's | Tomy | March 26, 1998 | Unreleased | Unreleased | | |
| Shin SD Sengokuden - Kidou Musha Taisen | | Bandai | December 20, 1996 | Unreleased | Unreleased | | |
| Shin Sedai Robot Senki: Brave Saga | Takara | Takara | December 17, 1998 | Unreleased | Unreleased | | |
| Shin Shikoutei | Shangri-La | Shangri-La | May 30, 1997 | Unreleased | Unreleased | | |
| Shin Super Robot Taisen | WinkySoft | Banpresto | December 27, 1996 | Unreleased | Unreleased | | |
| Shin Super Robot Taisen Special Disk (Note: expansion for Shin Super Robot Taisen.) | WinkySoft | Banpresto | March 28, 1997 | Unreleased | Unreleased | | |
| Shin Theme Park | Tose | Electronic Arts Victor | April 11, 1997 | Unreleased | Unreleased | | |
| Shingata Kururin Pa! | Sky Think Systems | Sky Think Systems | July 26, 1996 | Unreleased | Unreleased | | |
| Shinobi no Roku | Astec 21 | Astec 21 | October 5, 2000 | Unreleased | Unreleased | | |
| The Shinri Game 2 (Note: Includes competitive mini-games for two players in addition to psychological tests.) | Ukiyotei | Visit | May 2, 1997 | Unreleased | Unreleased | | |
| The Shinri Game 3 (Note: Includes 30 mini-games, with one-player and two-player competitive play, in addition to psychological tests.) | Ukiyotei | Visit | November 27, 1997 | Unreleased | Unreleased | | |
| Shinsei Toire no Kakosan | Future Pirates | Success | November 25, 1999 | Unreleased | Unreleased | | |
| Shinseiden Megaseed: Fukkatsu-hen | Japan Media Programming | Banpresto | July 31, 1997 | Unreleased | Unreleased | | |
| Shinseiki Evangelion: Eva to Yukai na Nakama Tachi | Gainax | Gainax | July 23, 1998 | Unreleased | Unreleased | | |
| Shinseiki Evangelion: Koutetsu no Girlfriend | Gainax | Gainax | April 16, 1998 | Unreleased | Unreleased | | |
| Shinseiki GPX Cyber Formula: Aratanaru Chousensha | Aspect | Vap | March 18, 1999 | Unreleased | Unreleased | | |
| Shin Senki VanGale | Aroma | Aroma | August 28, 1997 | Unreleased | Unreleased | | |
| Shinsetsu Samurai Spirits Bushido Retsuden | SNK, Asastsu, Fuji Television | SNK | June 27, 1997 | Unreleased | Unreleased | | |
| Shinshuku Taisan: It's a Noni! | TMF | Tonkin House | November 20, 1997 | Unreleased | Unreleased | | |
| Shinsou Kaiten: Wanwan Umi Monogatari: Sanyo Pachinko Paradise DX | Irem | Irem | October 25, 2001 | Unreleased | Unreleased | | |
| Shipwreckers! •Overboard!^{PAL} | Psygnosis | Psygnosis | Unreleased | October 1997 | October 31, 1997 | | |
| Shiritsu Houou Gakuen: 1-toshi Junai Kumi | J-Wing | J-Wing | January 25, 2001 | Unreleased | Unreleased | | |
| Shiritsu Houou Gakuen: 2-toshi Junai Kumi | J-Wing | J-Wing | April 26, 2001 | Unreleased | Unreleased | | |
| Shiritsu Justice Gakuen: Nekketsu Seisyun Nikki 2 | Capcom | Capcom | June 24, 1999 | Unreleased | Unreleased | | |
| Shisenfu Gekikara Mahjong | C-Lab | C-Lab | October 15, 1998 | Unreleased | Unreleased | | |
| Shisha no Yobu Yakata | Pandora Box | Pandora Box | January 20, 2000 | Unreleased | Unreleased | | |
| Shockwave Assault •Shockwave^{JP} | Apple Advanced Technology Group | Crystal Dynamics | October 18, 1996 | 1996 | December 5, 1995 | | |
| Shockwave: Operation Jumpgate (Note: Stand-alone expansion for Shockwave.) | Apple Advanced Technology Group | Crystal Dynamics | October 18, 1996 | Unreleased | Unreleased | | |
| Shogi II | Success | Success | October 28, 1999 | Unreleased | Unreleased | | |
| Shogi Saikyou 2 | Magical Company | Magical Company | March 19, 1998 | Unreleased | Unreleased | | |
| Shogi Saikyou: Pro ni Manabu | Magical Company | Magical Company | April 28, 1999 | Unreleased | Unreleased | | |
| Shoot | NAPS team | Phoenix Games | Unreleased | 2005^{DE} | Unreleased | | |
| Shooter: Space Shot •Simple 1500 Series Vol. 35: The Shooting^{JP} | A1 Games | Agetec, D3 Publisher^{JP} | August 3, 2000 | Unreleased | January 1, 2001 | | |
| Shooter: Starfighter Sanvein | A1 games | Success | March 30, 2000 | September 1, 2000 | February 28, 2001 | | |
| Shoryu Sangokuengi | Imagineer | Imagineer | February 16, 1996 | Unreleased | Unreleased | | |
| Shougi Joryuu Meijini-sen | Seta Corporation | Seta Corporation | December 8, 1995 | Unreleased | Unreleased | | |
| Shrek: Treasure Hunt | The Code Monkeys | TDK Interactive | Unreleased | November 29, 2002 | October 18, 2002 | | |
| Shura no Mon | Kodansha | Kodansha | April 2, 1998 | Unreleased | Unreleased | | |
| Shutokou Battle Gaiden: Super Technic Challenge | MediaQuest | MediaQuest | December 20, 1996 | Unreleased | Unreleased | | |
| Shutokou Battle R | Genki | Genki | April 25, 1997 | Unreleased | Unreleased | | |
| Shuukan Gallop: Breed Master | Pony Canyon | Pony Canyon | November 25, 1999 | Unreleased | Unreleased | | |
| Side By Side Special •Side By Side Special 2000^{JP} | Taito | Taito | December 4, 1997 | Unreleased | Unreleased | | |
| Side Pocket 3 | Prosoft Corporation | Data East | April 16, 1998 | Unreleased | Unreleased | | |
| Sidewinder 2 | Pegasus Entertainment | Asmik Ace | December 18, 1997 | Unreleased | Unreleased | | |
| Silent Bomber | CyberConnect2 | Bandai | October 28, 1999 | July 14, 2000 | February 29, 2000 | | |
| Silent Hill | Konami | Konami | March 4, 1999 | August 1, 1999 | January 31, 1999 | P | |
| Silent Iron | Phoenix Games | Phoenix Games | Unreleased | 2004 | Unreleased | | |
| Silent Mobius: Case Titanic | Gainax | Gainax | October 8, 1998 | Unreleased | Unreleased | | |
| Silent Mobius: Genei no Datenshi | TechnoSoft | Bandai | December 23, 1998 | Unreleased | Unreleased | | |
| Silhouette * Stories | Kaneko | Kaneko | September 27, 1996 | Unreleased | Unreleased | | |
| Silhouette Mirage | Treasure | Working Designs | July 23, 1998 | Unreleased | January 5, 2000 | | |
| Silver Jiken | Grasshopper Manufacture | ASCII Entertainment | October 7, 1999 | Unreleased | Unreleased | | |
| Silverload | Millennium Interactive | Vic Tokai | Unreleased | Unreleased | May 31, 1996 | | |
| SimCity 2000 | Maxis | EA Games | December 20, 1996 | November 1996 | July 6, 1996 | | |
| Simple 1500 Jitsuyou Series Vol. 07: Tanoshiku Manabu Unten Menkyo (Note: Includes interactive 3D driving exercises in addition to written driving-licence tests.) | | D3Publisher | May 2, 2001 | Unreleased | Unreleased | | |
| Simple 1500 Jitsuyou Series Vol. 18: Kanji Quiz ~Kanji Kentei ni Challenge~ (Note: Includes the "Kanji Shop" mini-game, in which players identify kanji for fish, fruit and flowers, alongside examination practice.) | | D3Publisher | May 23, 2002 | Unreleased | Unreleased | | |
| Simple 1500 Series Vol. 1: The Mahjong | Chatnoir | Culture Publishers | October 22, 1998 | Unreleased | Unreleased | | |
| Simple 1500 Series Vol. 2: The Shōgi | Alpha-Beta | Culture Publishers | October 22, 1998 | Unreleased | Unreleased | | |
| Simple 1500 Series Vol. 3: The Gomoku Narabe | Itsui | Culture Publishers | October 22, 1998 | Unreleased | Unreleased | | |
| Simple 1500 Series Vol. 4: The Reversi | Itsui | Culture Publishers | October 22, 1998 | Unreleased | Unreleased | | |
| Simple 1500 Series Vol. 5: The Igo | Ken Chen / Chat Noir | Culture Publishers | November 19, 1998 | Unreleased | Unreleased | | |
| Simple 1500 Series Vol. 6: The Hanafuda | Success / Chat Noir | Culture Publishers | November 19, 1998 | Unreleased | Unreleased | | |
| Simple 1500 Series Vol. 7: The Card | Success / Chat Noir | Culture Publishers | November 19, 1998 | Unreleased | Unreleased | | |
| Simple 1500 Series Vol. 8: The Solitaire | F2 Company | Culture Publishers | November 19, 1998 | Unreleased | Unreleased | | |
| Simple 1500 Series Vol. 9: The Chess •Check Mate^{PAL} | Success / Chat Noir | Culture Publishers | April 22, 1999 | April 1, 2001 | Unreleased | | |
| Simple 1500 Series Vol. 10: The Billiard | Argent / Success | Culture Publishers | April 22, 1999 | Unreleased | Unreleased | | |
| Simple 1500 Series Vol. 11: The Pinball 3D | Nekogumi | Culture Publishers | July 22, 1999 | Unreleased | Unreleased | | |
| Simple 1500 Series Vol. 12: The Quiz | Tears | Culture Publishers | August 12, 1999 | Unreleased | Unreleased | | |
| Simple 1500 Series Vol. 13: The Race^{JP} •Racing^{NA} •Pro Racer^{PAL} | Tamsoft | Culture Publishers^{JP}, Midas Interactive Entertainment^{PAL}, Agetec^{US} | July 22, 1999 | May 2, 2003 | January 2001 | | |
| Simple 1500 Series Vol. 14: The Block Kuzushi •Block Kuzushi | Tamsoft | Karuchua, D3 Publisher | August 12, 1999 | Unreleased | Unreleased | | |
| Simple 1500 Series Vol. 15: The Pachinko | Craftman (video game developer) | Culture Publishers | October 7, 1999 | Unreleased | Unreleased | | |
| Simple 1500 Series Vol. 16: The Pachi-Slot | D3 Publisher | D3 Publisher | November 19, 1999 | Unreleased | Unreleased | | |
| Simple 1500 Series Vol. 17: The Bike Race | NCS | D3 Publisher | September 30, 1999 | Unreleased | Unreleased | | |
| Simple 1500 Series Vol. 18: The Bowling^{JP} •Bowling^{NA} | Tamsoft | D3 Publisher^{JP}, Agetec^{NA} | November 18, 1999 | Unreleased | May 14, 2001 | | |
| Simple 1500 Series Vol. 19: The Sugoroku | Amedio | D3 Publisher | November 18, 1999 | Unreleased | Unreleased | | |
| Simple 1500 Series Vol. 21: The Yakyuu | E's | D3 Publisher | October 5, 2000 | Unreleased | Unreleased | | |
| Simple 1500 Series Vol. 22: The Pro Wrestling | Yuke's | D3 Publisher | December 9, 1999 | Unreleased | Unreleased | | |
| Simple 1500 Series Vol. 23: The Gateball | Amedio | D3 Publisher | December 9, 1999 | Unreleased | Unreleased | | |
| Simple 1500 Series Vol. 24: The Gun Shooting | Nekogumi | D3 Publisher | December 9, 1999 | Unreleased | Unreleased | | |
| Simple 1500 Series Vol. 25: The Keiba | Nekogumi | D3 Publisher | March 30, 2000 | Unreleased | Unreleased | | |
| Simple 1500 Series Vol. 26: The Tennis^{JP} •All Star Tennis^{PAL} •Tennis^{NA} | Nekogumi | D3 Publisher^{JP}, Midas Interactive^{PAL}, Agetec^{NA} | February 24, 2000 | April 25, 2003 | June 28, 2001 | | |
| Simple 1500 Series Vol. 27: The Snowboard^{JP} •Snowboarding^{NA} •Snowboard Racer^{PAL} | Atelier Double | D3 Publisher^{JP}, Midas Interactive^{PAL}, A1 Games^{NA} | February 24, 2000 | May 2, 2003 | December 10, 2000 | | |
| Simple 1500 Series Vol. 28: The Dungeon RPG | Mint | D3 Publisher | April 27, 2000 | Unreleased | Unreleased | | |
| Simple 1500 Series Vol. 29: The Tsuri | Access | D3 Publisher | July 13, 2000 | Unreleased | Unreleased | | |
| Simple 1500 Series Vol. 30: The Basket - 1 on 1 Plus | D3 Publisher | D3 Publisher | May 2, 2000 | Unreleased | Unreleased | | |
| Simple 1500 Series Vol. 31: The Sound Novel | Axes Art Amuse | D3 Publisher | July 13, 2000 | Unreleased | Unreleased | | |
| Simple 1500 Series Vol. 32: The Boxing •Boxing^{NA} •All Star Boxing^{PAL} | Nekogumi | D3 Publisher, A1 Games^{NA}, Midas Interactive Entertainment^{PAL} | August 3, 2000 | May 2, 2003 | May 14, 2001 | | |
| Simple 1500 Series Vol. 33: The Takkyuu | Amedio | D3 Publisher | August 3, 2000 | Unreleased | Unreleased | | |
| Simple 1500 Series Vol. 34: The Quiz Bangumi | Athena | D3 Publisher | August 3, 2000 | Unreleased | Unreleased | | |
| Simple 1500 Series Vol. 36: The Renai Simulation: Natsuiro Celebration | HuneX | D3 Publisher | August 24, 2000 | Unreleased | Unreleased | | |
| Simple 1500 Series Vol. 37: The Illust Puzzle & Slide Puzzle | Earthly Production | D3 Publisher | September 14, 2000 | Unreleased | Unreleased | | |
| Simple 1500 Series Vol. 38: The Real Racing: Toyota | D3 Publisher | D3 Publisher | September 14, 2000 | Unreleased | Unreleased | | |
| Simple 1500 Series Vol. 39: The Mahjong 2 | Warashi | D3 Publisher | October 26, 2000 | Unreleased | Unreleased | | |
| Simple 1500 Series Vol. 40: The Shogi 2 | Warashi | D3 Publisher | October 26, 2000 | Unreleased | Unreleased | | |
| Simple 1500 Series Vol. 41: The Reversi 2 | Yuki | D3 Publisher | October 26, 2000 | Unreleased | Unreleased | | |
| Simple 1500 Series Vol. 42: The Igo 2 | Yuki | D3 Publisher | October 26, 2000 | Unreleased | Unreleased | | |
| Simple 1500 Series Vol. 43: The Hanafuda 2 | Yuki | D3 Publisher | October 26, 2000 | Unreleased | Unreleased | | |
| Simple 1500 Series Vol. 46: The Mahjong Ochi Ge - Raku Jong | Enterbrain | D3 Publisher | November 16, 2000 | Unreleased | Unreleased | | |
| Simple 1500 Series Vol. 49: The Casino | Break | D3 Publisher | December 7, 2000 | Unreleased | Unreleased | | |
| Simple 1500 Series Vol. 50: The Billiard 2^{JP} •Billiards^{NA} | Agenda | D3 Publisher^{JP}, Agetec^{NA} | December 7, 2000 | Unreleased | May 14, 2001 | | |
| Simple 1500 Series Vol. 51: The Jigsaw Puzzle | AMS | D3 Publisher | December 28, 2000 | Unreleased | Unreleased | | |
| Simple 1500 Series Vol. 52: The Pro Wrestling 2 | Yuke's | D3 Publisher | December 14, 2000 | Unreleased | Unreleased | | |
| Simple 1500 Series Vol. 55: The Darts | Amedio | D3 Publisher | February 1, 2001 | Unreleased | Unreleased | | |
| Simple 1500 Series Vol. 56: The Sniper | Sol | D3 Publisher | March 22, 2001 | Unreleased | Unreleased | | |
| Simple 1500 Series Vol. 57: The Meiro | Mint | D3 Publisher | March 22, 2001 | Unreleased | Unreleased | | |
| Simple 1500 Series Vol. 58: The Sumo | D3Publisher | D3 Publisher | April 26, 2001 | Unreleased | Unreleased | | |
| Simple 1500 Series Vol. 59: The Suiri - IT Tantei: 18 no Jikenbo | Tomcat System | D3 Publisher | April 26, 2001 | Unreleased | Unreleased | | |
| Simple 1500 Series Vol. 60: The Table Hockey | Break | D3 Publisher | April 26, 2001 | Unreleased | Unreleased | | |
| Simple 1500 Series Vol. 61: The Quiz 2 | O Part | D3 Publisher | May 2, 2001 | Unreleased | Unreleased | | |
| Simple 1500 Series Vol. 62: The Ski | Atelier Double | D3 Publisher | May 31, 2001 | Unreleased | Unreleased | | |
| Simple 1500 Series Vol. 63: The Gun Shooting 2 | AMS | D3Publisher | May 31, 2001 | Unreleased | Unreleased | | |
| Simple 1500 Series Vol. 65: The Golf | Highwaystar | D3Publisher | July 5, 2001 | Unreleased | Unreleased | | |
| Simple 1500 Series Vol. 66: The Kaiten - Mawasun Da!! | Taito | D3Publisher | July 5, 2001 | Unreleased | Unreleased | | |
| Simple 1500 Series Vol. 70: The War Simulation - Nin no Tsukurishisha-tachi | Sol | D3Publisher | August 30, 2001 | Unreleased | Unreleased | | |
| Simple 1500 Series Vol. 71: The Renai Simulation 2 - Fureai | S-Neo | D3Publisher | August 30, 2001 | Unreleased | Unreleased | | |
| Simple 1500 Series Vol. 72: The Beach Volley | Break | D3Publisher | August 30, 2001 | Unreleased | Unreleased | | |
| Simple 1500 Series Vol. 73: The Invaders ~Space Invaders 1500~ | Taito | D3 Publisher | September 27, 2001 | Unreleased | Unreleased | | |
| Simple 1500 Series Vol. 74: The Horror Mystery | Game Stage | D3Publisher | September 27, 2001 | Unreleased | Unreleased | | |
| Simple 1500 Series Vol. 77: The Suiei | Game Stage | D3Publisher | October 25, 2001 | Unreleased | Unreleased | | |
| Simple 1500 Series Vol. 78: The Zero Yon | Opera House | D3Publisher | October 25, 2001 | Unreleased | Unreleased | | |
| Simple 1500 Series Vol. 79: The Shisenshou | Warashi | D3Publisher | December 20, 2001 | Unreleased | Unreleased | | |
| Simple 1500 Series Vol. 81: The Renai Adventure - Okaeri! | S-Neo | D3Publisher | December 20, 2001 | Unreleased | Unreleased | | |
| Simple 1500 Series Vol. 82: The Sensuikan | Tomcat System | D3Publisher | February 28, 2002 | Unreleased | Unreleased | | |
| Simple 1500 Series Vol. 84: The Intro Quiz | AMS | D3Publisher | January 31, 2002 | Unreleased | Unreleased | | |
| Simple 1500 Series Vol. 85: The Sengoku Bushou ~Tenka Touitsu no Yabou~ | Siesta | D3Publisher | January 31, 2002 | Unreleased | Unreleased | | |
| Simple 1500 Series Vol. 86: The Onigokko | Siesta | D3Publisher | February 28, 2002 | Unreleased | Unreleased | | |
| Simple 1500 Series Vol. 87: The Kyoutei | Highwaystar | D3Publisher | February 28, 2002 | Unreleased | Unreleased | | |
| Simple 1500 Series Vol. 88: The Gal Mahjong | Highwaystar | D3Publisher | March 28, 2002 | Unreleased | Unreleased | | |
| Simple 1500 Series Vol. 91: The Gambler ~Honoo no Tobaku Densetsu~ | Tomcat System | D3Publisher | March 28, 2002 | Unreleased | Unreleased | | |
| Simple 1500 Series Vol. 92: The Tozan RPG ~Ginrei no Hasha~ | HuneX | D3Publisher | March 28, 2002 | Unreleased | Unreleased | | |
| Simple 1500 Series Vol. 94: The Cameraman - Gekisha Boy Omakefu | Tomcat System | D3Publisher | May 23, 2002 | Unreleased | Unreleased | | |
| Simple 1500 Series Vol. 96: The Yakyuu 2 | Access | D3Publisher | July 25, 2002 | Unreleased | Unreleased | | |
| Simple 1500 Series Vol. 98: The Futsal | Axes Art Amuse | D3Publisher | September 5, 2002 | Unreleased | Unreleased | | |
| Simple 1500 Series Vol. 99: The Kendo - Ken no Hanamichi | Amedio | D3Publisher | August 29, 2002 | Unreleased | Unreleased | | |
| Simple 1500 Series Vol. 100: The Uchuuhikoushi | Amedio | D3Publisher | August 29, 2002 | Unreleased | Unreleased | | |
| Simple 1500 Series Vol. 101: The Sentou | Max Entertainment | D3Publisher | January 30, 2003 | Unreleased | Unreleased | | |
| The Simpsons Wrestling | Big Ape Productions | Fox Interactive, Activision^{NA}, Electronic Arts^{PAL} | Unreleased | March 22, 2001 | April 12, 2001 | | |
| SimTown | Imagineering | Imagineering | May 16, 1997 | Unreleased | Unreleased | | |
| Simulation Pro Yakyuu '99 | Hect | Hect | July 29, 1999 | Unreleased | Unreleased | | |
| Simulation RPG Tsukuru | Pegasus Japan | ASCII | September 17, 1998 | Unreleased | Unreleased | | |
| Simulation Zoo | C&E Inc. | Soft Bank | November 29, 1996 | Unreleased | Unreleased | | |
| Sister Princess | Stack | Media Works | March 8, 2001 | Unreleased | Unreleased | | |
| Sister Princess 2 | Stack | Media Works | March 20, 2003 | Unreleased | Unreleased | | |
| Sister Princess: Pure Stories (Note: stand-alone expansion for Sister Princess.) (Note: Contains quiz mini-games.) | Stack | Media Works | December 13, 2001 | Unreleased | Unreleased | | |
| Sitting Ducks | The Code Monkeys | Light & Shadow Production | Unreleased | April 16, 2004 | Unreleased | | |
| Skeleton Warriors | Neversoft Entertainment | Playmates^{NA}, Virgin Interactive Entertainment^{PAL} | Unreleased | September 1, 1996 | May 22, 1996 | | |
| Ski Air Mix | KID | KID | July 23, 1998 | September 1, 2000 | Unreleased | | |
| Skullmonkeys •Klaymen Klaymen 2: Skullmonkey no Gyakushuu^{JP} | The Neverhood, Inc. | Electronic Arts^{NA/PAL}, River Hill Software^{JP} | August 13, 1998 | February 20, 1998 | January 31, 1998 | | |
| Sky Sports Football Quiz | Hothouse Creations | THQ | Unreleased | December 7, 2001 | Unreleased | | |
| Sky Sports Football Quiz Season 02 | Hothouse Creations | THQ | Unreleased | June 7, 2002 | Unreleased | | |
| Skydiving Extreme | Metro | Natsume Inc. | January 11, 2001 | Unreleased | August 9, 2001 | | |
| SL de Ikou! | Tomy | Tomy | December 17, 1998 | Unreleased | Unreleased | | |
| SL de Ikou! II | Tomy | Tomy | December 16, 1999 | Unreleased | Unreleased | | |
| Slam Dragon | Jaleco | Jaleco | April 12, 1996 | Unreleased | Unreleased | | |
| Slam 'n' Jam 96 featuring Magic & Kareem | Left Field Productions | Crystal Dynamics | Unreleased | 1996 | May 10, 1996 | | |
| Slamscape | Viacom New Media | Viacom New Media | Unreleased | Unreleased | September 30, 1996 | | |
| Slap Happy Rhythm Busters | Polygon Magic | ASK | June 29, 2000 | Unreleased | Unreleased | | |
| Slayers Royal | Japan Art Media | ESP Software | April 23, 1998 | Unreleased | Unreleased | | |
| Slayers Royal 2 | Kadokawa Shoten | ESP Software | July 1, 1999 | Unreleased | Unreleased | | |
| Slayers Wonderful | Banpresto | Banpresto | October 22, 1998 | Unreleased | Unreleased | | |
| Sled Storm | EA Canada | Electronic Arts | Unreleased | August 11, 1999 | July 31, 1999 | | |
| Slime Shiyou | Tohoku Shinsha | Tohoku Shinsha | October 4, 1996 | Unreleased | Unreleased | | |
| Slither Link | Game Studio | Success | June 28, 2001 | Unreleased | Unreleased | | |
| Slot! Pro: Ooeto Sakura Fubuki 2 | Nippon Telenet | Nippon Telenet | November 22, 2000 | Unreleased | Unreleased | | |
| Slot! Pro 2: Bakuretsu Oozumou Kurenai & Murasaki | Nippon Telenet | Nippon Telenet | March 29, 2001 | Unreleased | Unreleased | | |
| Slot! Pro 3: Juggler Special | Nippon Telenet | Nippon Telenet | February 14, 2002 | Unreleased | Unreleased | | |
| Slot! Pro 4: Tairyou Special | Nippon Telenet | Nippon Telenet | February 28, 2002 | Unreleased | Unreleased | | |
| Slot! Pro 5: Naniwa Sakura Fubuki & Shimauta | Nippon Telenet | Nippon Telenet | June 13, 2002 | Unreleased | Unreleased | | |
| Slot! Pro 6: Hyper Juggler V | Nippon Telenet | Nippon Telenet | September 26, 2002 | Unreleased | Unreleased | | |
| Slot! Pro 7: Hana Densetsu | Nippon Telenet | Nippon Telenet | November 21, 2002 | Unreleased | Unreleased | | |
| Slot! Pro 8: Shimauta 30 & Hana Densetsu 25 | Nippon Telenet | Nippon Telenet | June 19, 2003 | Unreleased | Unreleased | | |
| Slots | Coresoft | Activision | Unreleased | Unreleased | June 27, 2003 | | |
| Slotter Mania: Gekinetsu Okisuro! Siosai Special | Dorart | Dorart | April 26, 2001 | Unreleased | Unreleased | | |
| Slotter Mania 2 | Dorart | Dorart | January 17, 2002 | Unreleased | Unreleased | | |
| Slotter Mania 3 | Dorart | Dorart | March 28, 2002 | Unreleased | Unreleased | | |
| Slotter Mania 4: Gekiatsu Youkou! Siolar & King Castle & Kabuto | Dorart | Dorart | June 27, 2002 | Unreleased | Unreleased | | |
| Slotter Mania 5 | Dorart | Dorart | September 26, 2002 | Unreleased | Unreleased | | |
| Slotter Mania 6: Bakuretsu Sairai! Wadatsumi (2 Types) & Blue Lagoon | Dorart | Dorart | October 24, 2002 | Unreleased | Unreleased | | |
| Slotter Mania 7: Gekiatsu! Siosai-musume Seizoroi DX + Apache A | Dorart | Dorart | December 19, 2002 | Unreleased | Unreleased | | |
| Slotter Mania 8 | Dorart | Dorart | January 30, 2003 | Unreleased | Unreleased | | |
| Slotter Mania 9 | Dorart | Dorart | March 13, 2003 | Unreleased | Unreleased | | |
| Slotter Mania Core: Tokonatsu no Atsusa! Oasis | Dorart | Dorart | November 8, 2001 | Unreleased | Unreleased | | |
| Slotter Mania Gaiden: Chouatsu Densetsu! Golden Rookie & Fire V & Ryuuou | Dorart | Dorart | September 12, 2002 | Unreleased | Unreleased | | |
| Small Soldiers | DreamWorks Interactive | Electronic Arts | Unreleased | September 30, 1998 | September 30, 1998 | | |
| Smash Court^{JP} •Namco Tennis Smash Court^{PAL} | Namco | Namco^{JP}, Sony Computer Entertainment^{PAL} | September 6, 1999 | December 15, 1996 | Unreleased | | |
| Smash Court 2^{JP} •Anna Kournikova's Smash Court Tennis^{PAL} | Namco | Namco^{JP}, Sony Computer Entertainment^{PAL} | November 12, 1998 | June 1, 1999 | Unreleased | | |
| Smash Court 3 | Namco | Namco | November 9, 2000 | Unreleased | Unreleased | | |
| The Smurfs | Doki Denki | Infogrames | Unreleased | 1999 | December 14, 1999 | | |
| Smurf Racer! •3, 2, 1... Smurf! My First Racing Game^{PAL} | Artificial Mind & Movement | Infogrames | Unreleased | 2001 | April 1, 2001 | | |
| Snatcher | Konami | Konami | February 12, 1996 | Unreleased | Unreleased | | |
| Snobow Kids Plus | Racdym | Atlus | January 21, 1999 | Unreleased | Unreleased | | |
| Sno-Cross Championship Racing | UDS | Crave Entertainment | Unreleased | Unreleased | August 9, 2000 | | |
| Snow Break^{JP} •Extreme Snow Break^{PAL} | Toka | Atlus^{JP}, Microids^{PAL} | January 29, 1998 | March 10, 1998 | Unreleased | | |
| The Snowman | Gaga | Gaga | December 8, 1995 | Unreleased | Unreleased | | |
| Snow Racer '98 | Pam Development | Infogrames | Unreleased | 1998 | Unreleased | | |
| Soccer '97 | Silicon Dreams | Eidos Interactive | Unreleased | March 1997 | Unreleased | | |
| Soccer Kid | Krisalis Software | Telegames | Unreleased | December 13, 2003 | Unreleased | | |
| Söldnerschild Special | Koei | Koei | March 19, 1998 | Unreleased | Unreleased | | |
| Sol Divide | Boom | XS Games | Unreleased | Unreleased | March 11, 2003 | | |
| Sold Out | Make | Shinko Music | June 20, 1997 | Unreleased | Unreleased | | |
| Solid Link: Dungeon Side | Hect | Hect | November 16, 2000 | Unreleased | Unreleased | | |
| Solid Link: Tower Side | Hect | Hect | November 16, 2000 | Unreleased | Unreleased | | |
| Sonata | T&E Soft | T&E Soft | March 4, 1999 | Unreleased | Unreleased | | |
| Sonic Wings Special | Video System | Hamster Corporation^{JP}, Phoenix Games^{PAL} | August 30, 1996 | August 12, 2004 | Unreleased | | |
| Sorcerer's Maze^{NA} •Prism Land Story^{JP} •Prism Land^{PAL} | Dream Creators / D-cruise | XS Games^{NA}, Hect^{JP}, Midas Interactive^{PAL} | March 19, 1998 | May 31, 2001 | December 4, 2003 | | |
| Soreike! Anpanman | | Bandai | September 21, 2000 | Unreleased | Unreleased | | |
| Soreike! Anpanman 2: Anpanman to Daibouken! | | Bandai | July 26, 2001 | Unreleased | Unreleased | | |
| Soreike! Anpanman 3 | | Bandai | March 20, 2002 | Unreleased | Unreleased | | |
| Sotsugyou Crossworld | Hearty Robin | Hearty Robin | June 28, 1996 | Unreleased | Unreleased | | |
| Sotsugyou II: Neo Generation | Headroom | Riverhillsoft | October 27, 1995 | Unreleased | Unreleased | | |
| Sotsugyou III: Wedding Bell | West One | Shogakukan | April 2, 1998 | Unreleased | Unreleased | | |
| Sotsugyou M: Seito Kaichou no Karei naru Inbou | West One | Hearty Robin | July 30, 1998 | Unreleased | Unreleased | | |
| Sotsugyou R: Graduation Real | Headroom | Bandai | March 8, 1996 | Unreleased | Unreleased | | |
| Sotsugyou Vacation | Mycom | Mycom | October 16, 1997 | Unreleased | Unreleased | | |
| Sougaku Toshi Osaka | Tenky | King Records | March 11, 1999 | Unreleased | Unreleased | | |
| Sōkaigi | Yuke's | Square Co. | May 28, 1998 | Unreleased | Unreleased | | |
| Soukoban Basic | Itochu | Itochu | August 7, 1997 | Unreleased | Unreleased | | |
| Soukoban Basic 2 | Itochu | Itochu | August 6, 1998 | Unreleased | Unreleased | | |
| Soukoban Nanmon Shinan | Unbalance | Unbalance | April 1, 1999 | Unreleased | Unreleased | | |
| Soukou Kihei Votoms: Koutetsu no Gunzei | Takara | Takara | September 30, 1999 | Unreleased | Unreleased | | |
| Soukou Kihei Votoms: Lightning Slash | Takara | Takara | March 18, 1999 | Unreleased | Unreleased | | |
| Soukou Kihei Votoms: Uoodo-Kummen Hen | Takara | Takara | April 2, 1998 | Unreleased | Unreleased | | |
| Soukou Kihei Votoms Gaiden: Blue Knight Berserga Story | Takara | Takara | October 30, 1997 | Unreleased | Unreleased | | |
| Soukuu no Tsubasa: Gotha World | Micronet co., Ltd. | Micronet co., Ltd. | December 18, 1997 | Unreleased | Unreleased | | |
| Soukyuugurentai: Oubushutsugeki | Outback Pty | Data East | December 25, 1997 | Unreleased | Unreleased | | |
| Soul Blade •Soul Edge^{JP} | Namco | Namco | December 20, 1996 | May 1, 1997 | January 1997 | P | |
| Soul Master | Koei | Koei | November 20, 1997 | Unreleased | Unreleased | | |
| Soul of the Samurai •Ronin Blade^{PAL} | Konami Computer Entertainment Sapporo | Konami | April 28, 1999 | 1999 | August 31, 1999 | | |
| Sound Novel Evolution 1: Otogirisou Sosei-Hen | Chunsoft | Chunsoft | March 25, 1999 | Unreleased | Unreleased | | |
| Sound Novel Evolution 2: Kamaitachi no Yoru: Tokubetsu-Hen | Chunsoft | Chunsoft | December 3, 1998 | Unreleased | Unreleased | | |
| Sound Novel Evolution 3: Machi - Unmei no Kousaten | Chunsoft | Chunsoft | January 28, 1999 | Unreleased | Unreleased | | |
| Sound Novel Tsukūru 2 | ASCII Entertainment | ASCII Entertainment | September 25, 1997 | Unreleased | Unreleased | | |
| Souten no Shiroki Kami no Za: Great Peak | Pandora Box | SCEI | July 16, 1998 | Unreleased | Unreleased | | |
| South Park | Appaloosa Interactive | Acclaim Entertainment | Unreleased | 1999 | September 30, 1999 | | |
| South Park: Chef's Luv Shack | Acclaim Studios Austin | Acclaim Entertainment | Unreleased | Unreleased | October 31, 1999 | | |
| South Park Rally | Tantalus Interactive | Acclaim Entertainment | Unreleased | 1999 | November 30, 1999 | | |
| Soviet Strike | EA Tiburon | Electronic Arts | Unreleased | November 1996 | October 31, 1996 | P | |
| Space Adventure Cobra: The Shooting | SCEI | SCEI | November 22, 1996 | Unreleased | Unreleased | | |
| Space Battleship Yamato | | Bandai | February 4, 1999 | Unreleased | Unreleased | | |
| Space Battleship Yamato: Eiyuu no Kiseki | | Bandai | September 28, 2000 | Unreleased | Unreleased | | |
| Space Chaser 2000 | Success | Success | October 26, 2000 | Unreleased | Unreleased | | |
| Space Debris | Rage Software | Sony Computer Entertainment | Unreleased | January 2000 | Unreleased | | |
| Space Griffon VF-9 | Panther Software | Atlus | January 27, 1995 | Unreleased | November 25, 1995 | | |
| Space Hulk: Vengeance of the Blood Angels | Krisalis Software | Electronic Arts | Unreleased | July 1, 1996 | July 1, 1996 | | |
| Space Invaders •Space Invaders X^{JP} | Z-Axis | Activision | February 17, 2000 | 1999 | September 30, 1999 | | |
| Space Invaders - The Original Game | Taito | Taito | July 31, 1997 | Unreleased | Unreleased | | |
| Space Invaders 2000 | Taito | Taito | December 3, 1998 | Unreleased | Unreleased | | |
| Space Jam | Sculptured Software | Acclaim | Unreleased | March 14, 1997 | October 31, 1996 | | |
| Space Rider | NAPS team | Phoenix Games | Unreleased | August 9, 2004 | Unreleased | | |
| Spawn: The Eternal | Sony Interactive Studios America | Sony Computer Entertainment | September 17, 1998 | April 10, 1998 | December 9, 1997 | | |
| Spec Ops: Airborne Commando | Big Grub | Sony Computer Entertainment | Unreleased | Unreleased | October 31, 2002 | | |
| Spec Ops: Covert Assault | Runecraft | Sony Computer Entertainment | Unreleased | Unreleased | June 28, 2001 | | |
| Spec Ops: Ranger Elite | Runecraft | Take-Two Interactive | Unreleased | Unreleased | April 29, 2001 | | |
| Spec Ops: Stealth Patrol | Runecraft | Take-Two Interactive | Unreleased | Unreleased | June 5, 2000 | | |
| Spectral Blade | Idea Factory | Idea Factory | December 22, 1999 | Unreleased | Unreleased | | |
| Spectral Force | Idea Factory | Idea Factory | October 9, 1997 | Unreleased | Unreleased | | |
| Spectral Force 2 | Idea Factory | Idea Factory | October 15, 1998 | Unreleased | Unreleased | | |
| Spectral Force: Lovely Wickedness | Idea Factory | Idea Factory | August 26, 1999 | Unreleased | Unreleased | | |
| Spectral Tower | Idea Factory | Idea Factory | October 4, 1996 | Unreleased | Unreleased | | |
| Spectral Tower II | Idea Factory | Idea Factory | January 29, 1998 | Unreleased | Unreleased | | |
| Speed Freaks •Speed Punks^{NA} | Funcom | Sony Computer Entertainment | Unreleased | September 15, 1999 | April 18, 2000 | | |
| Speed Machines | Mere Mortals | Midas Interactive Entertainment | Unreleased | 2003 | Unreleased | | |
| Speed Racer | Graphic Research | Jaleco Entertainment | Unreleased | Unreleased | February 20, 1998 | | |
| Speedball 2100 | Bitmap Brothers | Take-Two Interactive | Unreleased | Unreleased | October 24, 2000 | | |
| Spice World | SCEE London Studio | Sony Computer Entertainment^{PAL}, Phygnosis^{NA} | Unreleased | June 1998 | July 31, 1998 | | |
| Spider-Man | Neversoft | Activision | April 26, 2001 | September 15, 2000 | August 30, 2000 | P | |
| Spider-Man 2: Enter Electro | Vicarious Visions | Activision | October 31, 2002 | October 26, 2001 | October 19, 2001 | P | |
| Spider: The Video Game | Boss Game Studios | BMG Interactive | Unreleased | April 1997 | February 26, 1997 | | |
| Spin Jam | Entertainment International | Empire Interactive | Unreleased | Unreleased | September 24, 2000 | | |
| SpongeBob SquarePants: SuperSponge | Climax Group | THQ | Unreleased | November 16, 2001 | September 21, 2001 | | |
| Sports Car GT | Point of View | Electronic Arts | Unreleased | Unreleased | March 31, 1999 | | |
| Sports Superbike | Midas Interactive Entertainment | Midas Interactive Entertainment | Unreleased | September 1, 2000 | Unreleased | | |
| Sports Superbike 2 | Interactive Entertainment | Midas Interactive Entertainment^{PAL}Mud Duck Productions^{NA} | Unreleased | December 13, 2002 | October 6, 2002 | | |
| Spot Goes To Hollywood | Burst Studios | Virgin Interactive Entertainment | Unreleased | February 15, 1997 | November 30, 1996 | | |
| Spriggan: Lunar Verse | FromSoftware | FromSoftware | June 17, 1999 | Unreleased | Unreleased | | |
| Spyro The Dragon | Insomniac Games | Sony Computer Entertainment | April 1, 1999 | October 23, 1998 | September 10, 1998 | P | |
| Spyro 2: Ripto's Rage! •Spyro 2: Gateway to Glimmer^{PAL} | Insomniac Games | Sony Computer Entertainment | March 16, 2000 | November 5, 1999 | October 31, 1999 | P | |
| Spyro: Year of the Dragon | Insomniac Games | Sony Computer Entertainment | Unreleased | November 10, 2000 | October 10, 2000 | P | |
| S.Q. Sound Qube | Human Entertainment | Human Entertainment | March 12, 1998 | Unreleased | Unreleased | | |
| St. Luminous Mission High School | Xing Entertainment | Xing Entertainment | May 25, 2000 | Unreleased | Unreleased | | |
| Stahlfeder: Tekkou Hikuudan | Santos | Santos | January 26, 1996 | Unreleased | Unreleased | | |
| Stakes Winner 2 | Saurus | Saurus | May 9, 1997 | Unreleased | Unreleased | | |
| Stakes Winner: G1 Kanzen Seihahe no Michi | Saurus | Saurus | December 6, 1996 | Unreleased | Unreleased | | |
| Standby Say You! | Human Entertainment | Human Entertainment | April 11, 1997 | Unreleased | Unreleased | | |
| The Star Bowling DX | Aroma | Aroma | January 22, 1998 | Unreleased | Unreleased | | |
| Star Fighter | Krisalis Software | Acclaim | Unreleased | Unreleased | July 18, 1996 | | |
| Star Gladiator Episode I: Final Crusade | Capcom | Capcom^{JP/NA}, Virgin Interactive Entertainment^{PAL} | October 25, 1996 | December 1996 | October 31, 1996 | | |
| Star Ixiom | Kuusou Kugaku | Namco^{JP}, Sony Computer Entertainment^{PAL} | September 9, 1999 | 2000 | Unreleased | | |
| Star Monja | GMF | GMF | June 18, 1998 | Unreleased | Unreleased | | |
| Star Ocean: The Second Story | Tri-Ace | Enix | July 30, 1998 | April 12, 2000 | May 31, 1999 | | |
| Star Trek: Invasion | Warthog | Activision | Unreleased | September 15, 2000 | June 29, 2000 | | |
| Star Wars Episode I: Jedi Power Battles | LucasArts | LucasArts | Unreleased | April 2000 | March 31, 2000 | | |
| Star Wars Episode I: The Phantom Menace | Big Ape Productions | LucasArts | Unreleased | September 24, 1999 | August 31, 1999 | | |
| Star Wars: Dark Forces | LucasArts | LucasArts | Unreleased | 1997 | November 30, 1996 | | |
| Star Wars: Demolition | Luxoflux | LucasArts^{NA}, Activision^{PAL} | Unreleased | December 15, 2000 | November 12, 2000 | | |
| Star Wars: Masters of Teräs Käsi | LucasArts | LucasArts | September 23, 1998 | March 1998 | October 31, 1997 | | |
| Star Wars: Rebel Assault II: The Hidden Empire | LucasArts | LucasArts | Unreleased | 1997 | November 30, 1996 | P | |
| Starblade Alpha | High Tech Lab Japan | Namco | March 31, 1995 | February 1996 | April 27, 1996 | | |
| StarBorders | Office Create | Acclaim Japan | August 21, 1997 | Unreleased | Unreleased | | |
| Startling Adventures: Kuusou Daibouken X 3 | Capcom | Capcom | May 24, 2001 | Unreleased | Unreleased | | |
| Startling Odyssey 1: Blue Evolution | Ray Force | Ray Force | July 15, 1999 | Unreleased | Unreleased | | |
| Starwinder | Mindscape | Mindscape | September 25, 1997 | January 10, 1997 | October 31, 1996 | | |
| Steel Harbinger | Mindscape | Mindscape | Unreleased | December 1996 | September 30, 1996 | | |
| Steel Reign | Chantemar Creations | Sony Computer Entertainment | Unreleased | February 1, 1998 | August 31, 1997 | | |
| Stock Car Racer | Kung Fu | Midas Interactive Entertainment | Unreleased | December 13, 2002 | Unreleased | | |
| Stolen Song: Tomoyasu Hotei | SCEI | SCEI | May 21, 1998 | Unreleased | Unreleased | | |
| Stone Walkers | SunSoft | SunSoft | October 18, 1996 | Unreleased | Unreleased | | |
| Str.at.e.s Analogy-ology! | Lightspan | Lightspan | Unreleased | Unreleased | 1998 | | |
| Str.at.e.s Match-A-Batch | Lightspan | Lightspan | Unreleased | Unreleased | 1998 | | |
| Str.at.e.s Matchmania! | Lightspan | Lightspan | Unreleased | Unreleased | 1998 | | |
| Str.at.e.s Parallel Lives! | Lightspan | Lightspan | Unreleased | Unreleased | 1998 | | |
| Str.at.e.s Riddle Roundup! | Lightspan | Lightspan | Unreleased | Unreleased | 1998 | | |
| Str.at.e.s Riddle Wrangler! | Lightspan | Lightspan | Unreleased | Unreleased | 1998 | | |
| Str.at.e.s Title This! Title That! | Lightspan | Lightspan | Unreleased | Unreleased | 1998 | | |
| Str.at.e.s Titlerama! | Lightspan | Lightspan | Unreleased | Unreleased | 1998 | | |
| Stray Sheep: Poe to Merry no Daibouken | Robot | Robot | September 9, 1999 | Unreleased | Unreleased | | |
| Streak: Hoverboard Racing | SingleTrac | GT Interactive | Unreleased | 1998 | October 31, 1998 | | |
| Street Fighter Alpha: Warrior's Dreams •Street Fighter Zero^{JP} | Capcom | Capcom^{JP/NA}, Virgin Interactive Entertainment^{PAL} | December 22, 1995 | May 21, 1996 | February 7, 1996 | | |
| Street Fighter Alpha 2 •Street Fighter Zero 2^{JP} | Capcom | Capcom^{JP/NA}, Virgin Interactive Entertainment^{PAL} | August 9, 1996 | December 1996 | September 30, 1996 | | |
| Street Fighter Alpha 3 •Street Fighter Zero 3^{JP} | Capcom | Capcom^{JP/NA}, Virgin Interactive Entertainment^{PAL} | December 23, 1998 | June 25, 1999 | April 30, 1999 | | |
| Street Fighter Collection | Capcom | Capcom^{JP/NA}, Virgin Interactive Entertainment^{PAL} | October 23, 1997 | July 1998 | December 16, 1997 | | |
| Street Fighter Collection 2 | Mitchell Corporation | Capcom^{JP/NA}, Virgin Interactive Entertainment^{PAL} | October 23, 1997 | July 1998 | October 31, 1998 | | |
| Street Fighter II Movie | Capcom | Capcom | December 15, 1995 | Unreleased | Unreleased | | |
| Street Fighter EX Plus Alpha | Arika | Capcom^{JP/NA}, Virgin Interactive Entertainment^{PAL} | July 17, 1997 | 1997 | September 30, 1997 | P | |
| Street Fighter EX2 Plus | Arika | Capcom^{JP/NA}, Virgin Interactive Entertainment^{PAL} | June 11, 1999 | 2000 | December 30, 1999 | | |
| Street Fighter Zero 2′ (Note: update for Street Fighter Alpha 2.) | Capcom | Capcom | November 12, 1998 | Unreleased | Unreleased | | |
| Street Fighter: The Movie | Incredible Technologies | Acclaim | August 11, 1995 | September 29, 1995 | September 9, 1995 | | |
| Street Racer | Vivid Image | Ubi Soft | January 10, 1997 | December 1, 1996 | October 31, 1996 | | |
| Street Racquetball •Simple 1500 Series Vol. 97: The Squash^{JP} | Highwaystar | Agetec Inc. | July 26, 2003 | Unreleased | January 7, 2003 | | |
| Street Scooters | TYO | Eon Digital Entertainment | July 29, 1999 | 2000 | Unreleased | | |
| Street Sk8er •Street Boarders^{JP} •"Simple 1500 Series Vol. 47: The Skateboard"^{JP} | Atelier Double | Electronic Arts | October 22, 1998 | April 1999 | February 26, 1999 | | |
| Street Sk8er 2 | Atelier Double | Electronic Arts | August 10, 2000 | March 14, 2000 | March 14, 2000 | | |
| Stressless Lesson: Les Les | Compile | Max Five | June 27, 1997 | Unreleased | Unreleased | | |
| Strider Hiryū | Capcom | Capcom | October 24, 2006 | Unreleased | Unreleased | | |
| Strider 2 •Strider Hiryū 2^{JP} | Capcom | Capcom | February 24, 2000 | December 15, 2000 | July 29, 2000 | | |
| Strike Force Hydra | Ignition Entertainment | Ignition Entertainment | Unreleased | May 23, 2003 | Unreleased | | |
| Strike Point | MotiveTime, Ltd. | Technos | Unreleased | Unreleased | September 1, 1996 | | |
| Striker '96 •Striker: World Cup Premiere Stage^{JP} | Rage Software | Acclaim | November 22, 1995 | February 1996 | February 15, 1996 | | |
| Striker Pro 2000 •UEFA Striker^{PAL} | Rage Software | Infogrames | Unreleased | 1999 | May 31, 2000 | | |
| Strikers 1945 (Japan) | Psiyko | Psikyo | July 19, 1996 | Unreleased | Unreleased | | |
| Strikers 1945 II •Strikers 1945^{US} | Psikyo | Success | October 22, 1998 | 2002 | March 27, 2001 | | |
| Stuart Little 2 | Magenta Software | Sony Computer Entertainment | Unreleased | July 19, 2002 | July 17, 2002 | P | |
| Studio P | Agenda | Argent | August 23, 1996 | Unreleased | Unreleased | | |
| Study Quest: Keisanjima no Daibouken | Shigakusha | Shigakusha | July 6, 2000 | Unreleased | Unreleased | | |
| Subete ga F ni Naru | KID | Electronic Arts Square | March 28, 2002 | Unreleased | Unreleased | | |
| Submarine Commander | Victor Interactive Software | JVC Music Europe | Unreleased | April 6, 2001 | Unreleased | | |
| Suchie-Pai Adventure: Doki Doki Nightmare | Jaleco | Jaleco | April 9, 1998 | Unreleased | Unreleased | | |
| Sudoku | Success | Success | May 27, 1999 | Unreleased | Unreleased | | |
| Sudoku 2 | Success | Success | January 27, 2000 | Unreleased | Unreleased | | |
| Sudoku 3 | Success | Success | June 29, 2000 | Unreleased | Unreleased | | |
| Sudoku 4 | Success | Success | November 30, 2000 | Unreleased | Unreleased | | |
| Sudoku 5 | Success | Success | May 24, 2001 | Unreleased | Unreleased | | |
| Suikoden | Konami Computer Entertainment Tokyo | Konami | December 15, 1995 | April 11, 1997 | November 1, 1996 | | |
| Suikoden II •幻想水滸伝II (Gensō Suikoden Tsū)^{JP} | Konami | Konami | December 17, 1999 | July 28, 2000 | August 31, 1999 | | |
| Suikoden: Tendou 108 Sei | Koei | Koei | April 2, 1998 | Unreleased | Unreleased | | |
| Suikoden: Tenmei no Chikai | Koei | Koei | October 4, 1996 | Unreleased | Unreleased | | |
| Suiko Enbu: Outlaws of the Lost Dynasty | Data East | Data East | January 26, 1996 | Unreleased | Unreleased | | |
| Suizokukan Project: Fish Hunter e no Michi | Teichiku Records | Teichiku Records | March 11, 1999 | Unreleased | Unreleased | | |
| Summon Night | Flight-Plan | Banpresto | January 6, 2000 | Unreleased | Unreleased | | |
| Summon Night 2 | Flight-Plan | Banpresto | August 2, 2001 | Unreleased | Unreleased | | |
| Suna no Embrace: Eden no Sato no Never | Idea Factory | Idea Factory | July 27, 2000 | Unreleased | Unreleased | | |
| Super Adventure Rockman | Kouyousha | Capcom | June 25, 1998 | Unreleased | Unreleased | | |
| Super Bass Fishing | King Records | King Records | August 26, 1999 | Unreleased | Unreleased | | |
| Super Black Bass X2 | Starfish | Starfish | February 3, 2000 | Unreleased | Unreleased | | |
| Super Bubble Pop | Zombie Studios, Runecraft | Jaleco | Unreleased | Unreleased | December 25, 2002 | | |
| Super Dropzone: Intergalactic Rescue Mission | Ignition Entertainment | Ignition Entertainment | Unreleased | October 3, 2003 | Unreleased | | |
| Super Football Champ | Taito | Mindscape | November 29, 1996 | October 1997 | Unreleased | | |
| Super GALS! Kotobuki Ran Special → Coolmen Get you Gals Party → | Konami | Konami | August 8, 2002 | Unreleased | Unreleased | | |
| Super Hero Sakusen | Banpresto | Banpresto | January 28, 1999 | Unreleased | Unreleased | | |
| Super Hero Sakusen: Diedal's Ambition | Banpresto | Banpresto | November 22, 2000 | Unreleased | Unreleased | | |
| Super Live Stadium | SquareSoft | Aques | January 1, 1998 | Unreleased | Unreleased | | |
| Super Match Soccer | Cranberry Source | Acclaim Entertainment | Unreleased | August 1998 | Unreleased | | |
| Super Puzzle Fighter II Turbo •Super Puzzle Fighter II X^{JP} | Capcom | Capcom^{JP/NA}, Virgin Interactive Entertainment^{PAL} | December 6, 1996 | July 1, 1997 | November 30, 1996 | | |
| Super Robot Shooting | Minato Giken | Banpresto | March 20, 1997 | Unreleased | Unreleased | | |
| Super Robot Wars Alpha | Banpresto | Banpresto | May 25, 2000 | Unreleased | Unreleased | | |
| Super Robot Wars Alpha Gaiden | Banpresto | Banpresto | May 29, 2001 | Unreleased | Unreleased | | |
| Super Robot Wars EX | WinkySoft | Banpresto | January 6, 2000 | Unreleased | Unreleased | | |
| Super Robot Wars F | WinkySoft | Banpresto | December 10, 1998 | Unreleased | Unreleased | | |
| Super Robot Wars F Final | WinkySoft | Banpresto | April 15, 1999 | Unreleased | Unreleased | | |
| Super Shot Soccer | Tecmo | Tecmo | Unreleased | Unreleased | June 14, 2002 | | |
| Super Tokusatsu Taisen 2001 | Japan Art Media | Banpresto | September 6, 2001 | Unreleased | Unreleased | | |
| Superbike 2000 | Milestone srl | EA Sports | Unreleased | March 2000 | March 1, 2000 | | |
| Superbike Masters | Phoenix Games | Phoenix Games | Unreleased | June 10, 2004 | Unreleased | | |
| Supercross 2000 | MBL Research | EA Sports | Unreleased | 1999 | October 31, 1999 | | |
| Supercross | Page 44 Studios | EA Sports | Unreleased | Unreleased | November 21, 2000 | | |
| SuperCross Circuit | Idol Minds | 989 Sports | Unreleased | Unreleased | October 31, 1999 | | |
| Superstar Dance Club: #1 Hits!!! | Warashi | XS Games | November 1, 2001 | July 4, 2003 | December 1, 2002 | | |
| Surf Riders •Max Surfing 2000^{JP} | ACOT | Ubi Soft | November 18, 1999 | September 29, 2000 | August 1, 2000 | | |
| Susume! Kaizoku | Artdink | Artdink | December 3, 1998 | Unreleased | Unreleased | | |
| Susume! Taisen Puzzle Dama | Konami | Konami | March 1, 1996 | Unreleased | Unreleased | | |
| Suzu Monogatari | Capcom | Capcom | June 1, 2000 | Unreleased | Unreleased | | |
| Suzuki Bakuhatsu | SOL | Enix | July 6, 2000 | Unreleased | Unreleased | | |
| Suzumepai Yuugi '99: Tanuki no Kawasanyou | Media Rings | Media Rings | December 17, 1998 | Unreleased | Unreleased | | |
| Sven-Goran Eriksson's World Cup Challenge •Mundial 2002 Challenge •Marcel Desailly Pro Football •WM Nationalspieler | Anco Software | The 3DO Company | Unreleased | May 20, 2002 | Unreleased | | |
| Sven-Goran Eriksson's World Cup Manager | Anco Software | The 3DO Company | Unreleased | June 28, 2002 | Unreleased | | |
| Swagman | Core Design | Eidos Interactive | Unreleased | July 1, 1997 | August 10, 1997 | | |
| Sword of Camelot | The Code Monkeys | Midas Interactive | Unreleased | April 12, 2001 | Unreleased | | |
| Sydney 2000 | Attention to Detail | Eidos Interactive | Unreleased | Unreleased | July 31, 2000 | | |
| Syndicate Wars | Bullfrog Productions | Electronic Arts | Unreleased | July 31, 1997 | July 31, 1997 | | |
| Syphon Filter | 989 Studios | Sony Computer Entertainment | August 12, 1999 | July 9, 1999 | January 31, 1999 | | |
| Syphon Filter 2 | 989 Studios | Sony Computer Entertainment | Unreleased | July 20, 2000 | February 29, 2000 | P | |
| Syphon Filter 3 | 989 Studios | Sony Computer Entertainment | Unreleased | November 30, 2001 | November 5, 2001 | P | |
| Syusse Mahjong Daisettai | King Records | King Records | August 23, 1996 | Unreleased | Unreleased | | |
| T: Kara Hajimaru Monogatari | Jaleco | Jaleco | June 4, 1998 | Unreleased | Unreleased | | |
| T'ai Fu: Wrath of the Tiger | DreamWorks Interactive | Activision | Unreleased | April 26, 1999 | February 28, 1999 | | |
| T.R.A.G. •Hard Edge^{JP,PAL} | SunSoft | SunSoft | December 3, 1998 | May 20, 1999 | March 31, 1999 | | |
| Tactical Armor Custom Gasaraki | Kuusou Kagaku | Atlus | January 13, 2000 | Unreleased | Unreleased | | |
| Tactics Ogre: Let Us Cling Together | Kuusou Kagaku | Atlus | September 25, 1997 | Unreleased | September 25, 1997 | | |
| Tadaima Wakusei Kaitakuchuu! | Altron | Altron | November 3, 1995 | Unreleased | Unreleased | | |
| Taiho Shichauzo! | Pioneer LDC | Pioneer LDC | March 29, 2001 | Unreleased | Unreleased | | |
| Taikai Nobunaga Ten: Ge-Ten II | I'Max | I'Max | June 6, 1997 | Unreleased | Unreleased | | |
| Taiketsu Rumi-Zu! | Sanyo | Octagon | June 21, 1996 | Unreleased | Unreleased | | |
| Taikou Risshiden II | Koei | Koei | February 23, 1996 | Unreleased | Unreleased | | |
| Taikou Risshiden III | Koei | Koei | August 19, 1999 | Unreleased | Unreleased | | |
| Taikyoku Igo: Shinzui / Go Sennin | J-Wing | J-Wing | February 4, 1999 | Unreleased | Unreleased | | |
| Taikyoku Igo: Shinzui / Go Sennin Nigou | J-Wing | J-Wing | March 23, 2000 | Unreleased | Unreleased | | |
| Taikyoku Shogi: Kiwame | Log | Log | September 29, 1995 | Unreleased | Unreleased | | |
| Tail Concerto | CyberConnect2 | Atlus | April 16, 1998 | 1999 | August 31, 1999 | | |
| Tail of the Sun | Artdink | SCEA | April 26, 1996 | Unreleased | April 30, 1997 | | |
| Taisen Renai Simulation: Trifers Mahou Gakuen | ASCII Entertainment | ASCII Entertainment | April 20, 2000 | Unreleased | Unreleased | | |
| Taiyou no Otsuge | Progress Software | Progress Software | April 22, 1999 | Unreleased | Unreleased | | |
| Takeo Oshima: Mahjong Teiou | Gaps | Gaps | August 30, 1996 | Unreleased | Unreleased | | |
| Takuramakan | Petra | Petra | November 22, 1996 | Unreleased | Unreleased | | |
| Tales of Destiny | Namco | Namco | December 23, 1997 | Unreleased | September 30, 1998 | | |
| Tales of Eternia •Tales of Destiny II^{NA} | Wolf Team | Namco^{JP}, Namco Hometek^{NA} | November 30, 2000 | Unreleased | September 10, 2001 | | |
| Tales of Fandom Vol. 1 (Note: stand-alone expansion for the Tales series.) (Note: Contains mini-games.) | Wolf Team | Namco | January 31, 2002 | Unreleased | Unreleased | | |
| Tales of Phantasia | Wolf Team | Namco | December 23, 1998 | Unreleased | Unreleased | | |
| Tall Twins Tower | Open Sesame | Techno Soleil | November 2, 2000 | Unreleased | Unreleased | | |
| Tall Infinity | Techno Soleil | Agetec | December 22, 1999 | Unreleased | August 20, 2003 | | |
| TAMA | Time Warner Interactive | Time Warner Interactive | December 3, 1994 | Unreleased | Unreleased | | |
| Tamago de Puzzle | Matrix Software | SCEI | May 20, 1999 | Unreleased | Unreleased | | |
| Tanaka Torahiko no Uru Toraryuu Shogi | Arc System Works | Arc System Works | September 9, 1999 | Unreleased | Unreleased | | |
| Tank Racer | Glass Ghost, Simis | Grolier Interactive | Unreleased | March 26, 1999 | Unreleased | | |
| Tanoshii Mahjong | Koei | Koei | December 17, 1998 | Unreleased | Unreleased | | |
| Tantei Jinguuji Saburou Early Collection | Data East | Data East | August 5, 1999 | Unreleased | Unreleased | | |
| Tantei Jinguuji Saburou: Mikan no Rupo | Data East | Data East | November 29, 1996 | Unreleased | Unreleased | | |
| Tantei Jinguuji Saburou: Touka ga Kienu Aidani | Data East | Data East | November 25, 1999 | Unreleased | Unreleased | | |
| Tantei Jinguuji Saburou: Yume no Owarini | Data East | Data East | April 23, 1998 | Unreleased | Unreleased | | |
| Taregoro: Tarepanda no Iru Nichijou | | Bandai | August 31, 2000 | Unreleased | Unreleased | | |
| Tasogare no Ode: Ode to the Sunset Era | Tonkin House | Tonkin House | December 27, 1996 | Unreleased | Unreleased | | |
| Tatsunoko Fight | Electronics Application | Takara | October 5, 2000 | Unreleased | Unreleased | | |
| Taxi 2 | DC Studios | Ubi Soft | Unreleased | 2002 | Unreleased | | |
| Team Buddies | SCEE London Studio | Sony Computer Entertainment^{PAL}, Midway Games^{NA} | Unreleased | September 15, 2000 | September 18, 2000 | | |
| Team LOSI RC Racer^{NA} •Buggy^{PAL} | Gremlin Interactive | Gremlin Interactive^{PAL}, Fox Interactive^{NA} | Unreleased | July 1, 1998 | October 1, 1998 | | |
| Tear Ring Saga | Tirnanog | Enterbrain | May 24, 2001 | Unreleased | Unreleased | | |
| Techno BB | Konami | Konami | April 26, 2001 | Unreleased | Unreleased | | |
| TechnoMage: Return of Eternity | Sunflowers Interactive | Sunflowers Interactive | Unreleased | June 29, 2001 | Unreleased | | |
| Tecmo Stackers •Deron Dero Dero^{JP} | Tecmo | Tecmo | December 29, 1995 | Unreleased | September 1, 1997 | | |
| Tecmo Super Bowl | Tecmo | Tecmo | Unreleased | Unreleased | August 10, 1996 | | |
| Tecmo World Golf •The Perfect Golf^{JP} | Tecmo | Tecmo | December 1, 1995 | Unreleased | June 1, 1996 | | |
| Tecmo's Deception: Invitation to Darkness | Tecmo | Tecmo | July 26, 1996 | November 22, 1996 | July 25, 1996 | | |
| Tehodoki Mahjong: Nyuumon-hen | Spiel | Naxat Soft | March 25, 1999 | Unreleased | Unreleased | | |
| Teitoku no Ketsudan II | Koei | Koei | August 23, 1996 | Unreleased | Unreleased | | |
| Teitoku no Ketsudan III •Teitoku no Ketsudan III with Power-Up Kit^{JP} | Koei | Koei | March 28, 1997 | Unreleased | Unreleased | | |
| Tekken | Namco | Namco^{JP}, Namco Hometek^{NA}, Sony Computer Entertainment^{PAL} | March 31, 1995 | November 7, 1995 | November 8, 1995 | P | |
| Tekken 2 | Namco | Namco^{JP}, Namco Hometek^{NA}, Sony Computer Entertainment^{PAL} | March 29, 1996 | August 27, 1996 | October 2, 1996 | P | |
| Tekken 3 | Namco | Namco^{JP}, Namco Hometek^{NA}, Sony Computer Entertainment^{PAL} | March 26, 1998 | September 12, 1998 | April 25, 1998 | P | |
| Tempest X3 | High Voltage Software | Interplay Productions | Unreleased | February 1997 | November 30, 1996 | | |
| Tenchi Muyo! Toukou Muyou | Xing Entertainment | Xing Entertainment | September 13, 1996 | Unreleased | Unreleased | | |
| Tenchi o Kurau II: Sekiheki no Tatakai | Capcom | Capcom | March 22, 1996 | Unreleased | Unreleased | | |
| Tenchu: Stealth Assassins | Acquire | Activision, SCEI^{JP} | February 26, 1998 | October 30, 1998 | August 31, 1998 | P | |
| Tenchu 2: Birth of the Stealth Assassins | Acquire | Activision | November 30, 2000 | September 8, 2000 | August 7, 2000 | | |
| Tenchu: Shinobi Hyakusen (Note: stand-alone expansion for Tenchu: Shinobi Gaisen.) | Acquire, Various | SCEI | November 11, 1999 | Unreleased | Unreleased | | |
| Tenchu: Shinobi Gaisen (Note: update for Tenchu: Stealth Assassins.) | Acquire | SCEI | February 24, 1999 | Unreleased | Unreleased | | |
| Tenga-Seiha | Imagineer | Imagineer | February 21, 1997 | Unreleased | Unreleased | | |
| Tenka Touitsu | Unbalance | Unbalance | February 4, 1999 | Unreleased | Unreleased | | |
| Tenku no Escaflowne | | Bandai | September 25, 1997 | Unreleased | Unreleased | | |
| Tenkuu no Restaurant | Crea-Tech | Media Factory | November 16, 2000 | Unreleased | Unreleased | | |
| Tenkuu no Restaurant: Hello Project Version | Crea-Tech | Media Factory | March 1, 2001 | Unreleased | Unreleased | | |
| Tenma de Jack: Odoroki Manenoki Daitoubou | Exrays | Enix Corporation | March 23, 2000 | Unreleased | Unreleased | | |
| Tennis Arena | Smartdog | Ubisoft | March 19, 1998 | November 1997 | February 28, 1998 | | |
| Ten Pin Alley | Adrenlin Entertainment | SCEA | Unreleased | Unreleased | November 30, 1996 | | |
| Tensen-Nyannyan: Gekigyouban | TimePoint | TimePoint | February 26, 1998 | Unreleased | Unreleased | | |
| Tenshi Doumei | Entergram | TGL | April 23, 1998 | Unreleased | Unreleased | | |
| Tenshi na Konamaiki | Kamui | Bandai | September 26, 2002 | Unreleased | Unreleased | | |
| Tenshi no Shippo | | Bandai | February 27, 2003 | Unreleased | Unreleased | | |
| Tentama | KID | KID | January 25, 2001 | Unreleased | Unreleased | | |
| Terracon | Picture House | SCEE | Unreleased | August 25, 2000 | Unreleased | | |
| Test Drive 4 | Pitbull Syndicate | Accolade | April 2, 1998 | November 3, 1997 | September 30, 1997 | | |
| Test Drive 5 | Pitbull Syndicate | Accolade | March 25, 1999 | November 6, 1998 | September 30, 1998 | | |
| Test Drive 6 | Pitbull Syndicate | Infogrames North America^{NA}, Cryo Interactive^{PAL} | Unreleased | June 30, 2000 | October 31, 1999 | | |
| Test Drive Le Mans^{NA} •Le Mans 24 Hours^{PAL} | Eutechnyx | Infogrames | Unreleased | November 26, 1999 | May 4, 2000 | | |
| Test Drive: Off-Road | Elite Systems | Accolade^{NA}, Eidos Interactive^{PAL} | Unreleased | July 1, 1997 | February 28, 1997 | | |
| Test Drive: Off-Road 2^{NA} •Test Drive 4x4^{PAL} | Accolade, Pitbull Syndicate | Accolade | April 8, 1999 | 1999 | September 30, 1998 | | |
| Test Drive: Off-Road 3^{NA} •4x4 World Trophy^{PAL} | Infogrames North America | Infogrames North America | Unreleased | April 19, 2000 | October 18, 1999 | | |
| The Tetris | Success | Success | July 19, 2000 | Unreleased | Unreleased | | |
| Tetris Plus | Jaleco | Jaleco | September 6, 1996 | October 1997 | October 18, 1996 | | |
| Tetris with Cardcaptor Sakura: Eternal Heart | Arika | Arika | August 10, 2000 | Unreleased | Unreleased | | |
| Tetris X | Bullet-Proof Software | Bullet-Proof Software | March 29, 1996 | Unreleased | Unreleased | | |
| Tetsu Ikuzawa Kanshuu Meisha Retsuden: Greatest 70's | Graphic Research | Epoch Co. | December 18, 1997 | Unreleased | Unreleased | | |
| Tetsudou O '96: Ikuze Okuban Chouja | Atlus | Atlus | December 15, 1995 | Unreleased | Unreleased | | |
| Tetsudou O 2: Sekai Seifuku no Yabou | Earthly Soft | Atlus | September 25, 1997 | Unreleased | Unreleased | | |
| Tettelkaiseki Hissyou Pachislot Doujyho Yamasa & Pioneer | Yamasa | Hiromi | November 12, 1998 | Unreleased | Unreleased | | |
| TFX | Tomcat System | Imagineer | November 29, 1996 | Unreleased | Unreleased | | |
| That's Pon! | Shoeisha | Shoeisha | May 12, 1995 | Unreleased | Unreleased | | |
| That's QT | Koei | Koei | January 27, 2000 | Unreleased | Unreleased | | |
| Theme Aquarium | Tose | Electronic Arts Square | December 17, 1998 | Unreleased | Unreleased | | |
| Theme Hospital | Bullfrog Productions | Electronic Arts | June 18, 1998 | February 1998 | April 14, 1998 | | |
| Theme Park | Bullfrog Productions | Electronic Arts | December 29, 1995 | October 30, 1995 | October 15, 1995 | | |
| Theme Park World^{PAL,JP} •Sim Theme Park^{NA} | Climax Studios | Electronic Arts | March 16, 2000 | February 16, 2001 | March 22, 2000 | | |
| This is Football | London Studio | Sony Computer Entertainment | Unreleased | 1999 | Unreleased | | |
| This is Football 2 | London Studio | Sony Computer Entertainment | Unreleased | 2000 | Unreleased | | |
| Thousand Arms | Red Company | Atlus | December 17, 1998 | Unreleased | September 30, 1999 | | |
| Thrasher Presents: Skate and Destroy | Z-Axis | Rockstar Games | March 4, 2000 | November 15, 1999 | September 26, 1999 | | |
| Threads of Fate | Square | Square | October 14, 1999 | Unreleased | July 14, 2000 | | |
| The Three Decoders: Key to the Carousel | Lightspan | Lightspan | Unreleased | Unreleased | 2000 | | |
| The Three Decoders: Riddle of the Ring | Lightspan | Lightspan | Unreleased | Unreleased | 2000 | | |
| The Three Stooges | Cinemaware | Metro3D | Unreleased | Unreleased | February 7, 2004 | | |
| The Tower: Bonus Edition | Open Book | Open Book | November 1, 1996 | Unreleased | Unreleased | | |
| Thoroughbred Breeder II Plus | Hect | Hect | November 17, 1995 | Unreleased | Unreleased | | |
| Thoroughbred Breeder: Sekai Seiha-hen | Hect | Hect | April 23, 1998 | Unreleased | Unreleased | | |
| Thoroughbred Tatsu no Eikan: The Winning Throughbreds | Island Creation | Island Creation | May 3, 1996 | Unreleased | Unreleased | | |
| Thunder Force V | TechnoSoft | Working Designs | May 21, 1998 | Unreleased | August 31, 1998 | | |
| Thunder Storm LX-3 & Road Blaster | Ecseco | Ecseco | October 20, 1995 | Unreleased | Unreleased | | |
| Thunder Truck Rally •Monster Trucks^{PAL} | Reflections Interactive | Psygnosis | Unreleased | October 1997 | June 3, 1997 | | |
| TigerShark | n-space | GT Interactive | April 2, 1998 | August 10, 1997 | March 15, 1997 | | |
| Tiger Woods PGA Tour 99 | Adrenalin Entertainment, Electronic Arts | Electronic Arts | April 8, 1999 | November 15, 1998 | November 23, 1998 | | |
| Tiger Woods PGA Tour 2000 | EA Redwood Shores | Electronic Arts | Unreleased | January 30, 2000 | December 1999 | | |
| Tiger Woods PGA Tour Golf | EA Redwood Shores | Electronic Arts | Unreleased | December 8, 2000 | November 13, 2000 | | |
| Tigger's Honey Hunt •Disney Winnie l'Ourson : La Chasse au Miel de Tigrou^{FR} | Doki Denki Studio | NewKidCo^{NA}, Ubi Soft^{PAL} | Unreleased | December 8, 2000 | November 2000 | P | |
| Tilk: Aoi Umi kara Kita Shoujo | Entergram | TGL | April 25, 1997 | Unreleased | Unreleased | | |
| Time Bokan Series: Bokan Desuyo •Time Bokan: Yattaman^{PAL} | Eleven | Banpresto | March 12, 1998 | June 10, 2001 | Unreleased | | |
| Time Bokan Series: Bokan to Ippatsu! Doronbo | Eleven | Banpresto | November 29, 1996 | Unreleased | Unreleased | | |
| Time Commando | Adeline Software | Activision^{NA}, Electronic Arts^{PAL}, Virgin Interactive Entertainment^{JP} | November 15, 1996 | September 1996 | September 30, 1996 | | |
| Time Crisis | Namco | Namco^{JP}, Namco Hometek^{NA}, Sony Computer Entertainment^{PAL} | June 27, 1997 | November 30, 1997 | November 12, 1997 | P | |
| Time Crisis: Project Titan | Namco | Namco^{JP}, Namco Hometek^{NA}, Sony Computer Entertainment^{PAL} | April 26, 2001 | April 6, 2001 | June 20, 2001 | P | |
| Time Gal and Ninja Hayate | Taito | Taito | July 5, 1996 | Unreleased | Unreleased | | |
| Timeless Jade Trade | Lightspan | Lightspan | Unreleased | Unreleased | 1999 | | |
| Timeless Math: Brainswarm | Lightspan | Lightspan | Unreleased | Unreleased | 2001 | | |
| Timeless Math: Lunar Base | Lightspan | Lightspan | Unreleased | Unreleased | 2001 | | |
| Timeless Math: Maya - King Jaguar's Village | Lightspan | Lightspan | Unreleased | Unreleased | 2001 | | |
| Timeless Math: Maya - Observatory | Lightspan | Lightspan | Unreleased | Unreleased | 2001 | | |
| Timeless Math: Maya - Search and Rescue | Lightspan | Lightspan | Unreleased | Unreleased | 2001 | | |
| Timeless Math: Rover Recovery | Lightspan | Lightspan | Unreleased | Unreleased | 2001 | | |
| Timeless Math: Space Flight Rescue | Lightspan | Lightspan | Unreleased | Unreleased | 2001 | | |
| Tintin: Destination Adventure | Runecraft | Infogrames | Unreleased | September 21, 2001 | Unreleased | | |
| Tiny Bullets | Kuusou Kagaku | SCEI | April 13, 2000 | Unreleased | Unreleased | | |
| Tiny Tank | Appaloosa Interactive | Sony Computer Entertainment | Unreleased | February 4, 2000 | August 31, 1999 | | |
| Tiny Toon Adventures: The Great Beanstalk •Tiny Toon Adventures: Buster And The Beanstalk^{PAL} | Terraglyph Interactive Studios | NewKidCo^{NA}, Sony Computer Entertainment^{PAL} | Unreleased | November 5, 1999 | November 18, 1998 | | |
| Tiny Toon Adventures: Toonenstein -- Dare to Scare | Terraglyph Interactive Studios | Vatical Entertainment^{NA}, Swing! Entertainment^{PAL} | Unreleased | November 2, 1999 | November 2, 1999 | | |
| Tiny Toon Adventures: Plucky's Big Adventure | Warthog | Conspiracy Entertainment^{NA}, Swing! Entertainment^{PAL} | Unreleased | October 3, 2001 | September 21, 2001 | | |
| Titan Wars | Crystal Dynamics | Crystal Dynamics | Unreleased | November 15, 1996 | Unreleased | | |
| TIZ: Tokyo Insect Zoo | General Entertainment | General Entertainment | March 29, 1996 | Unreleased | Unreleased | | |
| TNN Motor Sports Hardcore 4x4 | Gremlin Interactive | ASC Games | March 30, 1997 | December 13, 1996 | November 28, 1996 | | |
| TNN Motor Sports Hardcore TR | Eutechnyx | ASC Games | Unreleased | Unreleased | December 2, 1999 | | |
| Toaplan Shooting Battle 1 | Gazelle | Banpresto | August 30, 1996 | Unreleased | Unreleased | | |
| Tobaku Mokushiroku Kaiji | Kodansha | Kodansha | May 25, 2000 | Unreleased | Unreleased | | |
| Tobal No. 1 | DreamFactory | SCEA | August 2, 1996 | January 10, 1997 | September 30, 1996 | | |
| Tobal 2 | DreamFactory | Square | April 25, 1997 | Unreleased | Unreleased | | |
| TOCA Championship Racing | Codemasters | Codemasters | June 18, 1998 | November 1, 1997 | September 3, 1998 | P | |
| TOCA 2 Touring Cars •Touring Car Challenge^{NA} | Codemasters | Codemasters | Unreleased | December 1998 | November 11, 1999 | P | |
| TOCA World Touring Cars •Jarrett & Labonte Stock Car Racing^{NA} •WTC: World Touring Car Championship ^{JP} | Codemasters | Codemasters | November 9, 2000 | August 25, 2000 | October 2, 2000 | P | |
| Tōkidenshō Angel Eyes | Tecmo | Tecmo | December 11, 1997 | Unreleased | Unreleased | | |
| To Heart | Leaf | Leaf | March 25, 1999 | Unreleased | Unreleased | | |
| Tokimeki Memorial: Forever With You | Konami | Konami | October 13, 1995 | Unreleased | Unreleased | | |
| Tokimeki Memorial Drama Series Vol. 1 Nijiiro no Seishun | Konami | Konami | July 10, 1997 | Unreleased | Unreleased | | |
| Tokimeki Memorial Drama Series Vol. 2 Irodori no Love Song | Konami | Konami | March 26, 1998 | Unreleased | Unreleased | | |
| Tokimeki Memorial Drama Series Vol. 3 Tabidachi no Uta | Konami | Konami | April 1, 1999 | Unreleased | Unreleased | | |
| Tokimeki Memorial Private Collection | Konami | Konami | April 26, 1996 | Unreleased | Unreleased | | |
| Tokimeki Memorial Selection: Fujisaki Shiori | Konami | Konami | March 27, 1997 | Unreleased | Unreleased | | |
| Tokimeki Memorial: Taisen Puzzle-Dama | Konami | Konami | September 27, 1996 | Unreleased | Unreleased | | |
| Tokimeki Memorial Taisen Tokkae Dama | Konami | Konami | September 16, 1997 | Unreleased | Unreleased | | |
| Tokimeki Memorial 2 | Konami Computer Entertainment Tokyo | Konami | November 25, 1999 | Unreleased | Unreleased | | |
| Tokimeki Memorial 2 Substories: Dancing Summer Vacation (Note: stand-alone expansion for Tokimeki Memorial 2.) (Note: Contains mini-games.) | Konami | Konami | September 13, 2001 | Unreleased | Unreleased | | |
| Tokimeki Memorial 2 Substories: Leaping School Festival (Note: stand-alone expansion for Tokimeki Memorial 2.) (Note: Contains mini-games.) | Konami | Konami | March 29, 2001 | Unreleased | Unreleased | | |
| Tokimeki Memorial 2 Substories: Memories Ringing On (Note: stand-alone expansion for Tokimeki Memorial 2.) (Note: Contains mini-games.) | Konami | Konami | August 30, 2001 | Unreleased | Unreleased | | |
| Tokimeki Memorial 2 Taisen Puzzle Dama | Konami | Konami | March 15, 2001 | Unreleased | Unreleased | | |
| Tokimeki no Houkago | Konami | Konami | July 16, 1998 | Unreleased | Unreleased | | |
| Toko Toko Trouble | Media Entertainment | Media Entertainment | February 20, 2003 | Unreleased | Unreleased | | |
| Tokoro-san no Daifugou | Konami | Konami | November 16, 2000 | Unreleased | Unreleased | | |
| Tokyo 23ku Seifuku-Wars | Tao Human Systems | Map Japan | March 26, 1998 | Unreleased | Unreleased | | |
| Tokyo Dungeon | Marubeni | Kadokawa | November 22, 1995 | Unreleased | Unreleased | | |
| Tokyo Highway Battle | Genki | Jaleco Entertainment | May 3, 1996 | June 27, 1997 | September 30, 1996 | | |
| Tokyo Majin Gakuen Ken Kaze Tobari | Open Sesame | Asmik Ace Entertainment, Inc | June 18, 1998 | Unreleased | Unreleased | | |
| Tokyo Majin Gakuen Oboro-Kitan (Note: expansion for Tokyo Majin Gakuen Kenpuuchou.) (Note: Contains mini-games.) | Open Sesame | Asmik Ace Entertainment, Inc | April 22, 1999 | Unreleased | Unreleased | | |
| Tokyo Majin Gakuen Gehoujou | Shout! Designworks | Asmik Ace Entertainment, Inc | January 24, 2002 | Unreleased | Unreleased | | |
| Tokyo Mew Mew | WinkySoft | Takara | December 5, 2002 | Unreleased | Unreleased | | |
| Tokyo Shadow | Taito Corporation | Taito Corporation | September 27, 1996 | Unreleased | Unreleased | | |
| Tokyo Wakusei Planetokio | OutSide Directors Company | Asmik Ace Entertainment, Inc | August 26, 1999 | Unreleased | Unreleased | | |
| Tom Clancy's Rainbow Six | Red Storm Entertainment | Red Storm Entertainment | June 13, 2002 | November 19, 1999 | November 23, 1999 | | |
| Tom Clancy's Rainbow Six: Lone Wolf | Red Storm Entertainment | Red Storm Entertainment | Unreleased | July 5, 2002 | August 22, 2002 | | |
| Tom Clancy's Rainbow Six: Rogue Spear | Red Storm Entertainment | Red Storm Entertainment | Unreleased | January 19, 2001 | March 27, 2001 | P | |
| Tom and Jerry in House Trap | Warthog Games | NewKidCo^{NA}, Ubi Soft^{PAL} | September 19, 2002 | November 20, 2000 | November 21, 2000 | | |
| Tomb Raider | Core Design | Eidos Interactive | February 14, 1997 | November 22, 1996 | November 14, 1996 | P | |
| Tomb Raider II | Core Design | Eidos Interactive | January 22, 1998 | November 21, 1997 | November 21, 1997 | P | |
| Tomb Raider III: Adventures of Lara Croft | Core Design | Eidos Interactive | March 4, 1999 | November 24, 1998 | November 20, 1998 | P | |
| Tomb Raider: The Last Revelation | Core Design | Eidos Interactive | July 19, 2000 | December 3, 1999 | November 24, 1999 | | |
| Tomb Raider: Chronicles | Core Design | Eidos Interactive | May 31, 2001 | November 17, 2000 | November 26, 2000 | P | |
| Tomba! •Tombi!^{PAL} •Ore! Tomba^{JP} | Whoopee Camp | Whoopee Camp^{JP}, Sony Computer Entertainment^{NA/PAL} | December 25, 1997 | September 4, 1998 | June 30, 1998 | | |
| Tomba! 2: The Evil Swine Return •Tombi! 2^{PAL} •Tomba! The Wild Adventures^{JP} | Whoopee Camp | Whoopee Camp^{JP}, Sony Computer Entertainment^{NA/PAL} | October 28, 1999 | June 16, 2000 | January 18, 2000 | | |
| Tomika Town o Tsukurou! | Tomy Corporation | Tomy Corporation | March 11, 1999 | Unreleased | Unreleased | | |
| Tommi Mäkinen Rally •International Rally Championship^{FR} | EuroPress Software | EuroPress Software | Unreleased | June 3, 1998^{FR} | Unreleased | | |
| Tonde! Tonde! Diet | Twilight Express | Twilight Express | December 20, 2001 | Unreleased | Unreleased | | |
| Tonka Space Station | Data Design Interactive | Hasbro Interacrtive | Unreleased | Unreleased | November 6, 2000 | | |
| Tony Hawk's Pro Skater •Tony Hawk's Skateboarding^{PAL} | Neversoft | Activision | March 30, 2000 | October 18, 1999 | August 29, 1999 | P | |
| Tony Hawk's Pro Skater 2 | Neversoft | Activision | March 8, 2001 | September 29, 2000 | September 19, 2000 | P | |
| Tony Hawk's Pro Skater 3 | Shaba Games | Activision | Unreleased | November 30, 2001 | October 30, 2001 | P | |
| Tony Hawk's Pro Skater 4 | Vicarious Visions | Activision | Unreleased | November 15, 2002 | October 23, 2002 | P | |
| Tonzura Kun | Pony Canyon | Pony Canyon | September 6, 1996 | Unreleased | Unreleased | | |
| Top Gun: Fire At Will | MicroProse | Spectrum Holobyte | February 15, 1997 | July 15, 1996 | June 15, 1996 | | |
| ToPoLo | FlipFlop | Artdink | December 16, 1996 | Unreleased | Unreleased | | |
| Tora! Tora! Tora! | Nexus Interact | Dazz | November 13, 1997 | Unreleased | Unreleased | | |
| Torneko: The Last Hope | Matrix Software | Enix Corporation | September 15, 1999 | Unreleased | November 15, 2000 | | |
| Toshinden Card Quest | Takara | Takara | April 2, 1998 | Unreleased | Unreleased | | |
| Toshinden Subaru •Toshinden 4^{PAL} | Tamsoft | Studio 3 | August 12, 1999 | June 30, 2000 | Unreleased | | |
| Total Eclipse Turbo | Crystal Dynamics | Crystal Dynamics | October 13, 1995 | November 12, 1997 | August 29, 1995 | | |
| Touge Max 2 | Cave | Atlus | September 17, 1998 | Unreleased | Unreleased | | |
| Touge Max G | Cave | Atlus | January 13, 2000 | Unreleased | Unreleased | | |
| Touhou Chinyuuki: Hafling Hearts!! | Earthly Soft | Naxat Soft | November 22, 1996 | Unreleased | Unreleased | | |
| Tour Party: Sotsugyou Ryokou ni Ikou | Japan Media Programming | Takara | February 26, 1998 | Unreleased | Unreleased | | |
| Tower Dream 2 | Crea-Tech | Axela | December 23, 1998 | Unreleased | Unreleased | | |
| Toy Story 2: Buzz Lightyear to the Rescue | Traveller's Tales | Activision | Unreleased | February 4, 2000 | November 16, 1999 | P | |
| Toy Story Racer | Traveller's Tales | Activision | Unreleased | March 23, 2001 | March 5, 2001 | | |
| Toyomaru Club Vol. 1 | KSS | KSS | September 13, 2001 | Unreleased | Unreleased | | |
| Toyota Netz Racing | Atlus | Atlus | 1999 | Unreleased | Unreleased | | |
| Toys | The Code Monkeys | Phoenix Games | Unreleased | August 9, 2004 | Unreleased | | |
| Toys Dream | Mediamuse | KSS | November 26, 1998 | Unreleased | Unreleased | | |
| Transformers: Beast Wars Transmetals | Wavedge | Bam! Entertainment | December 9, 1999 | Unreleased | June 24, 2000 | | |
| Transport Tycoon | MicroProse | MicroProse | Unreleased | September 15, 1997 | Unreleased | | |
| Transport Tycoon 3D | MicroProse | Unbalance | August 6, 1998 | Unreleased | Unreleased | | |
| Trap Gunner: Countdown to Oblivion | Racdym | Atlus | August 6, 1998 | June 25, 1999 | September 30, 1998 | | |
| Trash It | Rage Software | GT Interactive | Unreleased | July 1997 | Unreleased | | |
| Treasure Gear | MiraiSoft | MiraiSoft | July 31, 1997 | Unreleased | Unreleased | | |
| Treasure Planet | Magenta Software | Sony Computer Entertainment | Unreleased | November 13, 2002 | November 13, 2002 | P | |
| Treasures of the Deep | Black Ops Entertainment | Namco Hometek^{NA}, Sony Computer Entertainment^{PAL} | Unreleased | July 1, 1998 | August 31, 1997 | | |
| Trick'n Snowboarder | Cave | Capcom^{JP/NA}, Virgin Interactive Entertainment^{PAL} | February 4, 1999 | December 29, 2000 | October 19, 1999 | | |
| Trickshot | Selen | Phoenix Games | Unreleased | March 14, 2003 | Unreleased | | |
| Triple Play 97 | Electronic Arts | EA Sports | January 17, 1997 | Unreleased | August 1, 1996 | | |
| Triple Play 98 | Electronic Arts | EA Canada | September 25, 1997 | Unreleased | May 13, 1997 | | |
| Triple Play 99 | EA Sports | EA Sports | November 12, 1998 | Unreleased | February 28, 1998 | | |
| Triple Play 2000 | Treyarch | EA Sports | Unreleased | May 7, 1999 | February 28, 1999 | | |
| Triple Play 2001 | Treyarch | EA Sports | Unreleased | Unreleased | March 14, 2000 | | |
| Triple Play Baseball | EA Sports | Treyarch | Unreleased | Unreleased | March 12, 2001 | | |
| Tripuzz | Santos | Santos | October 30, 1997 | Unreleased | Unreleased | | |
| TRL: The Rail Loaders | MBA International | Victory Japan | April 6, 2000 | Unreleased | Unreleased | | |
| Truck Racing | Kung Fu | Midas Interactive Entertainment | Unreleased | December 13, 2002 | Unreleased | | |
| Truck Rally | Phoenix Games | Phoenix Games | Unreleased | August 9, 2004 | Unreleased | | |
| True Love Story | Bits Laboratory | ASCII Entertainment | December 13, 1996 | Unreleased | Unreleased | | |
| True Love Story ~Remember my Heart~ (Note: update for True Love Story.) | Bits Laboratory | ASCII Entertainment | December 11, 1997 | Unreleased | Unreleased | | |
| True Love Story 2 | Bits Laboratory | ASCII Entertainment | January 21, 1999 | Unreleased | Unreleased | | |
| True Pinball | Digital Illusions | Acclaim | May 31, 1996 | May 1996 | June 24, 1996 | P | |
| Tsumu | Hect | Hect | December 10, 1998 | Unreleased | Unreleased | | |
| Tsumu Light | Hect | Hect | September 14, 1999 | Unreleased | Unreleased | | |
| Tsun Tsun Kumi: Suuji de Puni Puni | Kodansha | Kodansha | September 23, 1998 | Unreleased | Unreleased | | |
| Tsun Tsun Kumi 2: Moji Moji Pakkun | Kodansha | Kodansha | November 19, 1998 | Unreleased | Unreleased | | |
| Tsun Tsun Kumi 3: Kanjivader | Kodansha | Kodansha | January 28, 1999 | Unreleased | Unreleased | | |
| Tsuribaka Nisshi | Atelier Double | Shogakukan | September 13, 1996 | Unreleased | Unreleased | | |
| Tsuri Kichi Sanpei: The Tsuri | Vingt-et-un Systems | Bandai | June 27, 2002 | Unreleased | Unreleased | | |
| Tsuukai!! Slot Shooting | Shoeisha | Shoeisha | June 14, 1996 | Unreleased | Unreleased | | |
| Tsuwadou Keiryuu Mizuumihen | Vingt-et-un Systems | Oz Club | January 28, 1999 | Unreleased | Unreleased | | |
| Tsuwadou Seabass Fishing | Vingt-et-un Systems | Oz Club | December 11, 1997 | Unreleased | Unreleased | | |
| Tunnel B1 | NEON Software | Acclaim, Ocean Software | October 4, 1996 | October 19, 1996 | October 31, 1996 | | |
| Turbo Prop Racing •Rapid Racer^{PAL} | London Studio | Sony Computer Entertainment | July 15, 1998 | October 1, 1997 | July 17, 1998 | | |
| Turf Wind '96: Take Yutaka Kyousouba Ikusei Game | Tose | Jaleco | September 27, 1996 | Unreleased | Unreleased | | |
| Turnabout | Artdink | Natsume Inc. | April 6, 2000 | May 1, 2004 | March 31, 2003 | | |
| Tunguska: Legend of Faith | Exortus | Take-Two Interactive | Unreleased | October 27, 2000 | Unreleased | | |
| TV Kamishibai Vol. 1 | Konami | Konami | December 9, 1999 | Unreleased | Unreleased | | |
| Tweenies: Game Time | Intelligent Games | BBC Multimedia | Unreleased | March 30, 2001 | Unreleased | | |
| Twilight Syndrome: Kyuumeihen | Human Entertainment | Human Entertainment | July 19, 1996 | Unreleased | Unreleased | | |
| Twilight Syndrome Saikai | Spike | Spike | July 27, 2000 | Unreleased | Unreleased | | |
| Twilight Syndrome: Tansakuhen | Human Entertainment | Human Entertainment | March 1, 1996 | Unreleased | Unreleased | | |
| Twin Goddesses | Polygram Magic of Japan | Polygram Magic of Japan | December 22, 1994 | Unreleased | Unreleased | | |
| TwinBee RPG | Konami Computer Entertainment Tokyo | Konami | April 2, 1998 | Unreleased | Unreleased | | |
| Twinbee Taisen Puzzle Dama | Konami | Konami | December 9, 1994 | Unreleased | Unreleased | | |
| Twins Story: Kimi ni Tsutaetakute | Fujitsu | Panther Software | June 24, 1999 | Unreleased | Unreleased | | |
| Twisted Metal | SCEA/Single Trac | SCEA | November 15, 1996 | January 16, 1996 | November 10, 1995 | | |
| Twisted Metal 2 •Twisted Metal: World Tour^{PAL} •Twisted Metal EX^{JP} | SCEA/Single Trac | SCEA | August 28, 1997 | February 10, 1997 | November 8, 1996 | | |
| Twisted Metal III | 989 Studios | 989 Studios | Unreleased | Unreleased | November 10, 1998 | | |
| Twisted Metal 4 | 989 Studios | SCEA | Unreleased | Unreleased | November 16, 1999 | | |
| Twisted Metal: Small Brawl | Incognito Entertainment | SCEA | Unreleased | Unreleased | November 27, 2001 | | |
| Two-Tenkaku | Sony Music Entertainment | Sony Music Entertainment | November 29, 1995 | Unreleased | Unreleased | | |
| Tyco R/C: Assault with a Battery | Lucky Chicken Games | Mattel Interactive | June 13, 2002 | Unreleased | September 19, 2000 | | |
| Ubik | Cryo Interactive | Cryo Interactive | Unreleased | October 27, 2000 | Unreleased | | |
| Uchi ni Pochi ga Yattekita - in my pocket | Konami | Konami | March 11, 1999 | Unreleased | Unreleased | | |
| Uchuu Goushouden: Bakuretsu Akindo | Astec 21 | Astec 21 | March 22, 1996 | Unreleased | Unreleased | | |
| Uchuu no Rendezvous: Rama | Soft Bank | Soft Bank | May 7, 1998 | Unreleased | Unreleased | | |
| Uchuu Seibutsu Flopon-kun P! | Asmik Ace | Asmik Ace | March 31, 1995 | Unreleased | Unreleased | | |
| UEFA Challenge | Infogrames Sheffield House | Infogrames | Unreleased | April 13, 2001 | Unreleased | | |
| UEFA Champions League 1998/99 | Silicon Dreams | Eidos Interactive | Unreleased | March 26, 1999 | Unreleased | | |
| UEFA Champions League 1999/00 | Silicon Dreams | Eidos Interactive | Unreleased | March 2000 | Unreleased | | |
| UEFA Champions League 2000/01 | Silicon Dreams | Eidos Interactive | Unreleased | 2000 | Unreleased | | |
| UEFA Euro 2000 | EA Sports | EA Sports | Unreleased | August 10, 2000 | Unreleased | | |
| UFO: A Day in the Life | Love-de-Lic | ASCII Entertainment | June 24, 1999 | Unreleased | Unreleased | | |
| Ugetsu Kitan | Tonkin House | Tonkin House | July 5, 1996 | Unreleased | Unreleased | | |
| Ugoku Tomika Zukan | Atlus | Atlus | November 14, 2002 | Unreleased | Unreleased | | |
| Uki Uki Tsuri Tengoku: Kawa Monogatari | Teichiku Records | Teichiku Records | August 6, 1998 | Unreleased | Unreleased | | |
| Uki Uki Tsuri Tengoku: Ningyo Densetsu no Nazo | Teichiku Records | Teichiku Records | September 11, 1997 | Unreleased | Unreleased | | |
| Uki Uki Tsuri Tengoku: Uokami Densetsu o Oe | Teichiku Records | Teichiku Records | February 17, 2000 | Unreleased | Unreleased | | |
| Ultima Underworld: The Stygian Abyss | Blue Sky Productions | Origin Systems | March 14, 1997 | Unreleased | Unreleased | | |
| Ultimate Brain Games | Telegames Inc. | Telegames Inc. | Unreleased | Unreleased | December 2, 2003 | | |
| Ultimate Fighting Championship | Opus | Crave Entertainment | Unreleased | Unreleased | November 13, 2000 | | |
| Ultraman Cosmos | | Bandai | November 29, 2001 | Unreleased | Unreleased | | |
| Ultraman Fighting Evolution | Banpresto | Banpresto | February 19, 1998 | Unreleased | Unreleased | | |
| Ultraman Tiga & Ultraman Dyna: New Generations | | Bandai | July 16, 1998 | Unreleased | Unreleased | | |
| Ultraman Zearth | Tohoku Shinsha | Tohoku Shinsha | July 16, 1998 | Unreleased | Unreleased | | |
| Umezawa Yukari no Taikyoku Igo: Heisei Kiin II | Daiki | Daiki | December 17, 1998 | Unreleased | Unreleased | | |
| Umi no Nushi Tsuri: Takarajima ni Mukatte | Victor Interactive Software | Victor Interactive Software | July 22, 1999 | Unreleased | Unreleased | | |
| Umi no Oh! Yah! | Victor Interactive Software | Victor Interactive Software | October 29, 1998 | Unreleased | Unreleased | | |
| Umihara Kawase: Shun | Jackpot | XING | February 28, 1997 | Unreleased | Unreleased | | |
| Umihara Kawase: Shun - Second Edition (Note: update for Umihara Kawase: Shun.) | Jackpot | XING | January 1, 2000 | Unreleased | Unreleased | | |
| Um Jammer Lammy | NanaOn-Sha | SCEA | March 18, 1999 | September 10, 1999 | August 17, 1999 | | |
| Undou Fusoku Kaishou! Punch de Diet | Twilight Express | Twilight Express | March 14, 2002 | Unreleased | Unreleased | | |
| Ungra Walker | Success | Success | June 6, 2002 | Unreleased | Unreleased | | |
| The Unholy War | Toys For Bob | Eidos Interactive | Unreleased | September 1998 | September 30, 1998 | | |
| Universal Hata Kansen Kaiseki: Pachi-Slot Simulator | Human Entertainment | Human Entertainment | September 29, 1995 | Unreleased | Unreleased | | |
| Universal Nuts | Lay-Up | Lay-Up | February 5, 1998 | Unreleased | Unreleased | | |
| Universal Virtua Pachi-Slot: Hisshou Kouryakuhou | Map Japan | Map Japan | June 16, 1995 | Unreleased | Unreleased | | |
| Unknown Variable 1: Masque Manor | Lightspan | Lightspan | Unreleased | Unreleased | 1999 | | |
| Unknown Variable 2: Raven's Ridge | Lightspan | Lightspan | Unreleased | Unreleased | 1999 | | |
| Uno | Tose | MediaQuest | April 2, 1998 | Unreleased | Unreleased | | |
| The Unsolved | Japan Media Programming | Virgin Interactive Entertainment | May 2, 1997 | Unreleased | Unreleased | | |
| unStack | System Create | System Create | May 3, 1996 | Unreleased | Unreleased | | |
| Unten Daisuki - Doki Doki * Norimono Daibouken | Sunsoft | Sunsoft | December 13, 2001 | Unreleased | Unreleased | | |
| U.P.P. | Panther Software | Panther Software | September 17, 1998 | Unreleased | Unreleased | | |
| Uprising X | Cyclone Studios | The 3DO Company | Unreleased | Unreleased | November 30, 1998 | | |
| Urawaza Mahjong: Korette Tenwatte Yatsukai | Vaill | Spike | June 29, 2000 | Unreleased | Unreleased | | |
| Urban Chaos | Mucky Foot Productions | Eidos Interactive | Unreleased | April 15, 2000 | March 31, 2000 | | |
| USA Racer | Davilex | Davilex | Unreleased | May 10, 2002 | Unreleased | | |
| U.S. Navy Fighters | Electronic Arts | Electronic Arts Victor | November 6, 1997 | Unreleased | Unreleased | | |
| Utautau: Seirei Songs | Opus | Enix Corporation | February 24, 2000 | Unreleased | Unreleased | | |
| V-Rally | Infogrames Multimedia | Infogrames Multimedia^{PAL}, Electronic Arts^{NA} | Unreleased | July 1997 | September 30, 1997 | P | |
| V-Rally 2 | Eden Studios | Infogrames^{PAL}, Electronic Arts^{NA} | January 27, 2000 | 1999 | October 31, 1999 | P | |
| V-Ball: Beach Volley Heroes | Avit | Funsoft | Unreleased | 1998 | Unreleased | | |
| V-Tennis | Tonkin House | Acclaim Entertainment^{PAL,NA}, Tonkin House^{JP} | September 22, 1995 | June 15, 1997 | June 1, 1996 | | |
| V-Tennis 2 | Tonkin House | Tonkin House | November 29, 1996 | Unreleased | Unreleased | | |
| V2000 | Frontier Developments | Grolier Interactive | Unreleased | October 1998 | Unreleased | | |
| Vadims | Soft Bank | Soft Bank | May 10, 1996 | Unreleased | Unreleased | | |
| Vagrant Story | Square | Square | February 10, 2000 | June 21, 2000 | May 15, 2000 | | |
| Valkyrie Profile | Tri-Ace | Enix Corporation | December 22, 1999 | Unreleased | August 29, 2000 | | |
| Vampire: Kyuuketsuki Densetsu | Artdink | Artdink | March 4, 1999 | Unreleased | Unreleased | | |
| Vampire Hunter D •Vampire Hunter^{PAL} | Jaleco Entertainment | Jaleco Entertainment | December 9, 1999 | 2000 | September 25, 2000 | | |
| Vanark | Bit Town | Jaleco Entertainment | Unreleased | Unreleased | March 31, 2000 | | |
| Vandal Hearts | Konami Computer Entertainment Tokyo | Konami | October 25, 1996 | June 1, 1997 | March 27, 1997 | | |
| Vandal Hearts II | Konami Computer Entertainment Nagoya | Konami | July 8, 1999 | June 30, 2000 | November 30, 1999 | | |
| Vanguard Bandits •Epica Stella^{JP} | S-Neo | Working Designs | July 30, 1998 | Unreleased | April 29, 2000 | | |
| Vanishing Point | Clockwork Games | Acclaim Entertainment | Unreleased | March 9, 2001 | February 5, 2001 | | |
| Vegas Casino •Super Casino Special^{JP} •Super Casino Special (SuperLite 1500 Series)^{JP} | Coconuts Japan | Coconuts Japan^{JP}, Success^{JP}, Midas Interactive Entertainment^{PAL} | September 13, 1996; December 22, 1999 | September 1, 2000 | Unreleased | | |
| Vegas Games 2000 •Midnight in Vegas^{PAL} | The 3DO Company | The 3DO Company | Unreleased | 2000 | September 28, 1999 | | |
| Vehicle Cavalier | Vanguard Works | Vanguard Works | February 16, 1996 | Unreleased | Unreleased | | |
| Velldeselba Senki: Tsubasa no Kunshou | Tenky | SCEI | April 18, 1997 | Unreleased | Unreleased | | |
| Vermin Kids | Nexton | Electronic Arts Victor | November 1, 1996 | Unreleased | Unreleased | | |
| Versailles: A Game of Intrigue | Cryo Interactive | Cryo Interactive, Canal+ Multimedia, Réunion des Musées Nationaux | Unreleased | April 1998 | Unreleased | | |
| Vib-Ribbon | NanaOn-Sha | Sony Computer Entertainment | December 9, 1999 | September 1, 2000 | Unreleased | | |
| Victory Spike | Imagineer | Imagineer | June 7, 1996 | Unreleased | Unreleased | | |
| Victory Boxing Challenger •Victory Boxing^{JP} | Victor Interactive Software | JVC Music Europe^{PAL},Victor Interactive Software^{JP} | May 18, 2000 | 2001 | Unreleased | | |
| Victory Zone | SCEJ | SCEI | March 31, 1995 | Unreleased | Unreleased | | |
| Victory Zone 2 | SCEJ | SCEI | September 20, 1996 | Unreleased | Unreleased | | |
| Viewpoint | Visual Concepts | Electronic Arts | Unreleased | Unreleased | November 28, 1995 | | |
| Vigilante 8 | Luxoflux | Activision | Unreleased | Unreleased | May 31, 1998 | | |
| Vigilante 8: 2nd Offense | Luxoflux | Activision | Unreleased | Unreleased | October 31, 1999 | | |
| V.I.P. | Ubi Soft Shanghai | Ubi Soft | Unreleased | Unreleased | April 1, 2001 | | |
| Viper | X-ample | Infogrames | Unreleased | July 1998 | Unreleased | | |
| Virtua Pachi-Slot 7 | Map Japan | Map Japan | September 7, 2000 | Unreleased | Unreleased | | |
| Virtua Pachi-Slot EX | Map Japan | Map Japan | October 21, 1999 | Unreleased | Unreleased | | |
| Virtua Pachi-Slot Olympia Special | Map Japan | Map Japan | October 22, 1998 | Unreleased | Unreleased | | |
| Virtua Pachi-Slot V | Map Japan | Map Japan | September 2, 1999 | Unreleased | Unreleased | | |
| Virtua Pachi-Slot VI | Map Japan | Map Japan | February 17, 2000 | Unreleased | Unreleased | | |
| Virtual Bowling | Nichibutsu | Nichibutsu | July 31, 1997 | Unreleased | Unreleased | | |
| Virtual Gallop Kishudou | ISCO | Sunsoft | December 27, 1996 | Unreleased | Unreleased | | |
| Virtual Golf | Core Design | Victor Interactive Software | August 23, 1996 | September 27, 1996 | Unreleased | | |
| Virtual Hiyru no Ken | Culture Brain | Culture Brain | July 17, 1997 | Unreleased | Unreleased | | |
| Virtual Kasparov | Titus Software | Titus Software | Unreleased | Unreleased | August 15, 2001 | | |
| Virtual Kyotei '98 | Nichibutsu | Nichibutsu | July 2, 1998 | Unreleased | Unreleased | | |
| Virtual Kyotei '99 | Nichibutsu | Nichibutsu | April 1, 1999 | Unreleased | Unreleased | | |
| Virtual Kyotei 2000 | Nichibutsu | Nichibutsu | May 2, 2000 | Unreleased | Unreleased | | |
| Virtual Kyotei 21 | Nichibutsu | Nichibutsu | May 2, 2001 | Unreleased | Unreleased | | |
| Virtual Pool | Celeris | Interplay | Unreleased | May 1997 | February 28, 1997 | | |
| Virtual Pool 3 | Digital Mayhem | XS Games | Unreleased | Unreleased | August 11, 2003 | | |
| Virtual Pro Wrestling | Aki Corp. | Asmik Ace Entertainment, Inc | September 13, 1996 | Unreleased | Unreleased | | |
| Virus: The Battle Field | Polygram Magic of Japan | Polygram Magic of Japan | April 8, 1999 | Unreleased | Unreleased | | |
| Virus: It is Aware | Cryo Interactive | Cryo Interactive | Unreleased | June 1999 | Unreleased | | |
| The Visitors: The Relic of St. Rolande | Gaumont Multimedia | Ubi Soft | Unreleased | April 24, 2001 | Unreleased | | |
| Viva Football | Crimson Studio | Virgin Interactive Entertainment | February 10, 2000 | September 1998 | September 1999 | | |
| VMX Racing | Studio E | Playmates | Unreleased | Unreleased | June 30, 1997 | | |
| Voice Fantasia: Ushinawareta Voice Power | Japan Media Programming | ASK | October 12, 1997 | Unreleased | Unreleased | | |
| Voice Idol Collection: Pool Bar Story | Four Winds Software | Data East | April 18, 1997 | Unreleased | Unreleased | | |
| Voice Paradice Excella | Fill-In Cafe | ASK | November 22, 1997 | Unreleased | Unreleased | | |
| Volfoss | Namco | Namco | February 22, 2001 | Unreleased | Unreleased | | |
| VR Baseball '97 | VR Sports | Interplay | Unreleased | September 1997 | March 31, 1997 | | |
| VR Baseball '99 | VR Sports | Interplay | Unreleased | Unreleased | May 31, 1998 | | |
| VR Sports Powerboat Racing | Promethean Designs | Interplay | Unreleased | Unreleased | March 31, 1998 | | |
| Vs. | Polygon Magic | THQ | Unreleased | Unreleased | November 30, 1997 | | |
| Wacky Races | Appalosa Interactive | Infogrames | July 26, 2001 | October 19, 2001 | Unreleased | | |
| Wagamama * Fairy: Mirumo de Pon! Mirumo no Mahou Gakkou Monogatari | Jupiter Corporation | Konami | March 20, 2003 | Unreleased | Unreleased | | |
| Wai Wai 3-nin Uchi Mahjong | Hori | Hori | December 14, 2000 | Unreleased | Unreleased | | |
| Wai Wai Jansou | Hori | Hori | July 6, 2000 | Unreleased | Unreleased | | |
| Wai Wai Trump Taisen | Hori | Hori | December 14, 2000 | Unreleased | Unreleased | | |
| Waku Waku Bowling | Coconuts Japan | Coconuts Japan | April 2, 1998 | Unreleased | Unreleased | | |
| Waku Waku Derby | Dream Japan | Dream Japan | December 18, 1997 | Unreleased | Unreleased | | |
| Waku Waku Volley | Art Co., Ltd | Athena | November 26, 1998 | Unreleased | Unreleased | | |
| WakuPuyo Dungeon Ketteiban | Hori | Hori | March 18, 1999 | Unreleased | Unreleased | | |
| Wakusei Koukitai Little Cats | NEC | Family Soft | June 25, 1998 | Unreleased | Unreleased | | |
| Walt Disney World Quest: Magical Racing Tour | Crystal Dynamics | Eidos Interactive | Unreleased | June 23, 2000 | March 23, 2000 | | |
| Wangan Trial | Tose | Victor Interactive Software | March 7, 1998 | Unreleased | Unreleased | | |
| Wanted | NAPS team | Phoenix Games | Unreleased | 2004 | Unreleased | | |
| Warcraft 2: The Dark Saga | Climax Group | Electronic Arts | Unreleased | August 31, 1997 | August 31, 1997 | | |
| Warera Mitsurin Tankentai!! | Groove Box Japan | Victor Interactive Software | April 20, 2000 | Unreleased | Unreleased | | |
| WarGames: Defcon 1 | Interactive Studios Ltd. | MGM Interactive^{NA}, Electronic Arts^{PAL} | Unreleased | 1998 | June 30, 1998 | | |
| War Gods | Eurocom | Midway | Unreleased | October 1997 | June 20, 1997 | | |
| WarJetz | The 3DO Company | The 3DO Company | Unreleased | May 25, 2001 | June 27, 2001 | | |
| Warhammer: Dark Omen | Mindscape | Electronic Arts | Unreleased | 1998 | April 7, 1998 | | |
| Warhammer: Shadow of the Horned Rat | SSI | Mindscape | Unreleased | December 1996 | November 1, 1996 | | |
| Warhawk | SingleTrac | SCEA | October 4, 1996 | December 1995 | November 10, 1995 | | |
| Warm Up! GP 2001 | Lankhor | Microids | Unreleased | February 9, 2001 | Unreleased | | |
| Warriors of Might and Magic | The 3DO Company | The 3DO Company | Unreleased | Unreleased | February 7, 2000 | | |
| Warpath: Jurassic Park | Black Ops Entertainment | Electronic Arts | Unreleased | 1999 | October 31, 1999 | | |
| Warzone 2100 | Pumpkin Studios | Eidos Interactive | Unreleased | Unreleased | May 31, 1999 | | |
| Watashi no Rika-Chan | Takara | Takara | March 7, 2002 | Unreleased | Unreleased | | |
| Water Summer | Circus | PrincessSoft | July 18, 2002 | Unreleased | Unreleased | | |
| Wayne Gretzky's 3D Hockey '98 | Software Creations | Midway | Unreleased | Unreleased | December 26, 1997 | | |
| WCW Backstage Assault | Kodiak Interactive | Electronic Arts | Unreleased | December 1, 2000 | November 2000 | | |
| WCW Mayhem | Kodiak Interactive | Electronic Arts | Unreleased | 1999 | August 31, 1999 | | |
| WCW Nitro | Inland Productions | THQ | Unreleased | June 1998 | February 1998 | | |
| WCW/nWo Thunder | Inland Productions | THQ | Unreleased | 1999 | December 31, 1998 | | |
| WCW vs. the World •Virtual Pro-Westling^{JP} | The Man Breeze | THQ, Asmik Ace Entertainment^{JP} | September 13, 1996 | December 1997 | February 28, 1997 | | |
| Weakest Link | Traveller's Tales | Activision | Unreleased | 2001 | September 28, 2001 | | |
| Wedding Peach: Doki Doki Oiro-naoshi | KSS | KSS | September 27, 1996 | Unreleased | Unreleased | | |
| Welcome House | Gust | Gust | February 23, 1996 | Unreleased | Unreleased | | |
| Welcome House 2: Keaton and his Uncle | Gust | Gust | December 20, 1996 | Unreleased | Unreleased | | |
| Weltorv Estleia | Hudson Soft | Hudson Soft | February 25, 1999 | Unreleased | Unreleased | | |
| Wheel of Fortune | Artech Studios | Hasbro Interactive | Unreleased | Unreleased | December 15, 1998 | | |
| Wheel of Fortune 2nd Edition | Artech Studios | Hasbro Interactive | Unreleased | Unreleased | October 18, 2000 | | |
| Westlife Fan-O-Mania | Runecraft | TDK Mediactive | June 28, 2002 | Unreleased | Unreleased | | |
| Whistle: Fuki Nukeru Kaze | Konami | Konami | January 30, 2003 | Unreleased | Unreleased | | |
| White Diamond | Dual | Escot | November 25, 1999 | Unreleased | Unreleased | | |
| Whizz | Flair Software | Konami^{PAL}, B-Factory^{JP} | September 18, 1999 | February 1997 | Unreleased | | |
| Who Wants to Be a Millionaire? •Quiz $ Millionaire^{JP} •Wer wird Millionär^{DE} | Hothouse Creations | Eidos Interactive | December 20, 2001 | September 29, 2000 | Unreleased | | |
| Who Wants to Be a Millionaire? 2nd Edition | Jellyvision | Sony Computer Entertainment | Unreleased | Unreleased | June 23, 2000 | | |
| Who Wants to Be a Millionaire? 2nd Edition (Europe) •Wer wird Millionär 2. Edition^{DE} | Hothouse Creations | Eidos Interactive | Unreleased | September 29, 2001 | Unreleased | | |
| Who Wants to Be a Millionaire? 3rd Edition | Jellyvision | Sony Computer Entertainment | Unreleased | Unreleased | June 11, 2001 | | |
| Wer wird Millionär 3 (German) | Hothouse Creations | Eidos Interactive | Unreleased | November 30, 2002 | Unreleased | | |
| Who Wants to Be a Millionaire? Junior •Wer wird Millionär Junior^{DE} | Hothouse Creations | Eidos Interactive | Unreleased | July 6, 2001 | Unreleased | | |
| Wild 9 | Shiny Entertainment | Interplay Entertainment | February 10, 2000 | September 1998 | September 30, 1998 | | |
| Wild Arms | Media.Vision | Sony Computer Entertainment | December 20, 1996 | October 1998 | April 30, 1997 | | |
| Wild Arms 2 | Media.Vision | Sony Computer Entertainment | September 2, 1999 | Unreleased | April 30, 2000 | | |
| Wild Boater | Tao Human | Tao Human, Midas Interactive Entertainment | November 2, 1999 | Unreleased | Unreleased | | |
| Wild Rapids •Bakuryuu^{JP} | Fujimic, Inc. | GN Software^{PAL}, Fuji Television^{JP} | September 14, 2000 | September 8, 2000 | Unreleased | | |
| The Wild Thornberrys: Animal Adventure | Know Wonder | Mattel Interactive | Unreleased | Unreleased | November 8, 2000 | | |
| Williams Arcade's Greatest Hits | Digital Eclipse | Williams | Unreleased | Unreleased | April 10, 1996 | | |
| Windsurfer's Paradise | Theyer GFX | Midas Interactive | Unreleased | April 12, 2002 | Unreleased | | |
| Wing Commander III: Heart of the Tiger | Origin Systems | Electronic Arts | Unreleased | 1996 | March 15, 1996 | | |
| Wing Commander IV: The Price of Freedom | Origin Systems | Electronic Arts | Unreleased | 1997 | May 14, 1997 | | |
| Wing Over | Beluga Computer | Victor Interactive Software •JVC Music Europe^{PAL} | February 21, 1997 | October 1997 | Unreleased | | |
| Winky The Little Bear | The Code Monkeys | Phoenix Games | Unreleased | June 27, 2003 | Unreleased | | |
| Winnie the Pooh: Kindergarten | Hi Corp | BAM! Entertainment^{NA}, Sony Computer Entertainment^{PAL} | Unreleased | 2002 | November 5, 2002 | | |
| Winnie the Pooh: Preschool | Hi Corp | BAM! Entertainment | Unreleased | Unreleased | November 5, 2002 | | |
| Winning Eleven 3: Final Version (Note: update for World Soccer Jikkyou Winning Eleven 3: World Cup France '98.) | Konami Computer Entertainment Tokyo | Konami | November 12, 1998 | Unreleased | Unreleased | | |
| Winning Lure | Hori | Hori | July 27, 2000 | Unreleased | Unreleased | | |
| Winning Post EX | Koei | Koei | December 29, 1995 | Unreleased | Unreleased | | |
| Winning Post 2 | Koei | Koei | March 22, 1996 | Unreleased | Unreleased | | |
| Winning Post 2: Program '96 (Note: update for Winning Post 2.) | Koei | Koei | October 4, 1996 | Unreleased | Unreleased | | |
| Winning Post 2: Final '97 (Note: update for Winning Post 2.) | Koei | Koei | October 2, 1997 | Unreleased | Unreleased | | |
| Winning Post 3 | Koei | Koei | February 26, 1998 | Unreleased | Unreleased | | |
| Winning Post 3: Program '98 (Note: update for Winning Post 3.) | Koei | Koei | October 1, 1998 | Unreleased | Unreleased | | |
| Winning Post 4 | Koei | Koei | September 18, 1999 | Unreleased | Unreleased | | |
| Winning Post 4: Program 2000 (Note: update for Winning Post 4.) | Koei | Koei | March 23, 2000 | Unreleased | Unreleased | | |
| Wipeout | Psygnosis | Psygnosis | March 22, 1996 | September 29, 1995 | November 21, 1995 | P | |
| Wipeout 3 | Psygnosis | Psygnosis | Unreleased | Unreleased | August 31, 1999 | | |
| Wipeout 3: Special Edition (Note: update for Wipeout 3.) | Psygnosis | Psygnosis | Unreleased | July 14, 2000 | Unreleased | | |
| Wipeout XL •Wipeout 2097^{PAL} | Psygnosis | Psygnosis | November 8, 1996 | October 1996; February 1998 | September 30, 1996 | P | |
| Wizard's Harmony | Arc System Works | Arc System Works | December 29, 1995 | Unreleased | Unreleased | | |
| Wizard's Harmony 2 | Arc System Works | Arc System Works | October 16, 1997 | Unreleased | Unreleased | | |
| Wizard's Harmony R | Arc System Works | Arc System Works | November 26, 1998 | Unreleased | Unreleased | | |
| Wizardry VII: Gadeia no Houshu | Sir-Tech | Sir-Tech | October 13, 1995 | Unreleased | Unreleased | | |
| Wizardry Empire | Sir-Tech | Sir-Tech | December 28, 2000 | Unreleased | Unreleased | | |
| Wizardry Empire 2 | Sir-Tech | Sir-Tech | October 17, 2002 | Unreleased | Unreleased | | |
| Wizardry: Dimguil | Sir-Tech | Sir-Tech | April 20, 2000 | Unreleased | Unreleased | | |
| Wizardry: Llylgamyn Saga | Sir-Tech | Sir-Tech | February 26, 1998 | Unreleased | Unreleased | | |
| Wizardry: New Age of Llylgamyn | Sir-Tech | Sir-Tech | October 28, 1999 | Unreleased | Unreleased | | |
| Wolf Fang | Xing Entertainment | Xing Entertainment | May 10, 1996 | Unreleased | Unreleased | | |
| Wolkenkratzer: Shinpan no Tou | West One | Asmik Ace Entertainment, Inc | March 1, 1996 | Unreleased | Unreleased | | |
| Wonder B-Cruise | Sunsoft | SunSoft | October 7, 1999 | Unreleased | Unreleased | | |
| Wonder Trek | Zest Works | SCEI | December 10, 1998 | Unreleased | Unreleased | | |
| Wonder 3 | MBA International | Xing Entertainment | April 2, 1998 | Unreleased | Unreleased | | |
| Woody Woodpecker Racing | Syrox Developments | Konami | July 12, 2001 | December 22, 2000 | November 16, 2000 | | |
| World Championship Snooker | Blade Interactive | Codemasters | Unreleased | 2000 | Unreleased | | |
| World Cup 98 | EA Canada | EA Sports | Unreleased | March 31, 1998 | March 31, 1998 | | |
| World Cup Golf: Professional Edition | Arc Developments | U.S. Gold | March 1, 1996 | January 1996 | January 15, 1996 | | |
| World Destruction League: Thunder Tanks | The 3DO Company | The 3DO Company | Unreleased | November 17, 2000 | September 9, 2000 | | |
| World League Basketball | High Voltage Software | Mindscape | Unreleased | 1997 | Unreleased | | |
| World League Soccer 98 | Silicon Dreams Studio | Eidos | Unreleased | May 1998 | Unreleased | | |
| World Neverland: Olerud Oukoku Monogatari | Riverhillsoft | Riverhillsoft | October 23, 1997 | Unreleased | Unreleased | | |
| World Neverland 2: Pluto Kyouwakoku Monogatari | Riverhillsoft | Riverhillsoft | February 25, 1999 | Unreleased | Unreleased | | |
| World Neverland Series: Waneba Island | Riverhillsoft | Riverhillsoft | March 30, 2000 | Unreleased | Unreleased | | |
| World Pro Tennis '98 | I.Magic | Magnolia | August 6, 1998 | Unreleased | Unreleased | | |
| World Soccer Jikkyou Winning Eleven 3: World Cup France '98 | Konami | Konami | May 28, 1998 | Unreleased | Unreleased | | |
| World Stadium 2 | Namco | Namco | April 29, 1998 | Unreleased | Unreleased | | |
| World Stadium 3 | Namco | Namco | April 8, 1999 | Unreleased | Unreleased | | |
| World Stadium 4 | Namco | Namco | March 23, 2000 | Unreleased | Unreleased | | |
| World Stadium 5 | Namco | Namco | May 10, 2001 | Unreleased | Unreleased | | |
| World Stadium EX | Namco | Namco | July 26, 1996 | Unreleased | Unreleased | | |
| World's Scariest Police Chases •Folles Poursuites^{FR} | UDS | Fox Interactive, Activision | Unreleased | June 29, 2001 | May 21, 2001 | | |
| World Tennis Stars | Ignition Entertainment | Ignition Entertainment | Unreleased | June 2, 2004 | Unreleased | | |
| World Tour Conductor | TYO | TYO | August 26, 1999 | Unreleased | Unreleased | | |
| Worms | Team17 | Ocean Software | February 28, 1997 | December 1995 | August 7, 1996 | P | |
| Worms Armageddon | Team17 | Hasbro Interactive | Unreleased | November 30, 1999 | November 30, 1999 | | |
| Worms Pinball | Team17 | Infogrames | Unreleased | January 2000 | Unreleased | | |
| Worms World Party | The Code Monkeys | Ubi Soft | Unreleased | December 14, 2001 | December 14, 2001 | | |
| WRC: FIA World Rally Championship Arcade | Unique Development Studios | SCEE | Unreleased | November 8, 2002 | Unreleased | P | |
| Wreckin' Crew | Quickdraw Dev | Telstar | Unreleased | October 7, 1998 | October 7, 1998 | | |
| Wu-Tang: Shaolin Style | Paradox Development | Activision | June 29, 2000 | 1999 | October 31, 1999 | | |
| WWF Attitude | Acclaim Studios Salt Lake City | Acclaim Entertainment | Unreleased | Unreleased | July 31, 1999 | | |
| WWF In Your House | Sculptured Software | Acclaim Entertainment | February 27, 1997 | December 1996 | November 21, 1996 | | |
| WWF SmackDown! | Yuke's | THQ^{NA/PAL}, Yuke's^{JP} | August 8, 2000 | April 2000 | March 2, 2000 | P | |
| WWF SmackDown! 2: Know Your Role | Yuke's | THQ^{NA/PAL}, Yuke's^{JP} | January 25, 2001 | December 1, 2000 | November 21, 2000 | P | |
| WWF War Zone | Iguana West | Acclaim Entertainment | Unreleased | August 1998 | July 14, 1998 | P | |
| WWF WrestleMania: The Arcade Game | Sculptured Software | Acclaim Entertainment | January 26, 1996 | November 1995 | October 18, 1995 | | |
| X2 | Team17 | Ocean Software, Capcom^{JP} | August 21, 1997 | November 1996 | Unreleased | | |
| X: Unmei no Sentaku | | Bandai | August 22, 2002 | Unreleased | Unreleased | | |
| X-Bladez: Inline Skater | Vision Scape | Crave Entertainment^{NA}, Ubi Soft^{PAL} | Unreleased | March 22, 2002 | January 30, 2002 | | |
| X-COM: Terror from the Deep | MicroProse | MicroProse | Unreleased | December 1996 | Unreleased | | |
| X-COM: UFO Defense •X-COM: Enemy Unknown^{PAL} | MicroProse | MicroProse | Unreleased | November 1995 | October 25, 1995 | | |
| The X-Files | HyperBole Studios | Fox Interactive^{NA}, Sony Computer Entertainment^{PAL} | Unreleased | September 1999 | September 30, 1999 | | |
| X-Men: Children of the Atom | Probe Entertainment | Acclaim Entertainment | Unreleased | February 1998 | February 1998 | | |
| X-Men: Mutant Academy | Paradox Development | Activision | April 12, 2001 | August 18, 2000 | July 11, 2000 | | |
| X-Men: Mutant Academy 2 | Paradox Development | Activision | March 6, 2003 | September 21, 2001 | September 17, 2001 | | |
| X-Men vs. Street Fighter | Capcom | Capcom^{JP/NA}, Virgin Interactive Entertainment^{PAL} | February 26, 1998 | 1998 | June 11, 1998 | | |
| Xena: Warrior Princess | Universal Studios Digital Arts | Electronic Arts | Unreleased | 1999 | September 30, 1999 | | |
| Xenocracy | Grolier Interactive | | Unreleased | June 1998 | Unreleased | | |
| Xenogears | Square | Square^{JP}, Square Electronic Arts^{US} | February 11, 1998 | Unreleased | October 20, 1998 | | |
| Xevious 3D/G+ | Namco | Namco | March 28, 1997 | August 1997 | June 30, 1997 | | |
| XI [sai] Jumbo | Shift | SCEI | December 22, 1999 | Unreleased | Unreleased | | |
| XS Airboat Racing | Miracle Designs | XS Games | Unreleased | Unreleased | June 10, 2003 | | |
| XS Junior League Dodgeball | Yumedia | XS Games | Unreleased | Unreleased | September 3, 2003 | | |
| XS Junior League Football | Wahoo Studios | XS Games | Unreleased | Unreleased | December 3, 2003 | | |
| XS Junior League Soccer | Wahoo Studios | XS Games | Unreleased | 2003 | September 29, 2004 | | |
| XS Moto | XS Games | XS Games | Unreleased | Unreleased | March 1, 2003 | | |
| Xtreme Roller | Microïds | Microïds | Unreleased | October 5, 2001 | Unreleased | | |
| Yacht Racing Game 1999: Ore no Yatto: Ganbare Nippon Challenge | Graphic Research | Tomy Corporation | October 7, 1999 | Unreleased | Unreleased | | |
| Yakata: Nightmare Project | Chime | ASK | June 4, 1998 | Unreleased | Unreleased | | |
| Yakiniku Bugyou | Media Entertainment | Media Entertainment | May 24, 2001 | Unreleased | Unreleased | | |
| Yakitori Musume: Sugo Ude Hanjouki | Media Entertainment | Media Entertainment | May 9, 2002 | Unreleased | Unreleased | | |
| Yaku Tsuu: Noroi no Game | Idea Factory | | February 7, 1997 | Unreleased | Unreleased | | |
| Yaku: Yūjō Dangi | Axes Art Amuse, Idea Factory | Idea Factory | January 13, 1996 | Unreleased | Unreleased | | |
| Yamasa Digi Guide: Faust | Yamasa | Yamasa | January 18, 2001 | Unreleased | Unreleased | | |
| Yamasa Digi Guide: Hyper Rush | Yamasa | Yamasa | October 5, 2000 | Unreleased | Unreleased | | |
| Yamasa Digi Guide: M-771 | Yamasa | Yamasa | November 16, 2000 | Unreleased | Unreleased | | |
| Yamasa Digi Guide: New Pulsar R | Yamasa | Yamasa | October 5, 2000 | Unreleased | Unreleased | | |
| Yamasa Digi Guide: Umekagetsu R | Yamasa | Yamasa | December 21, 2000 | Unreleased | Unreleased | | |
| Yamasa Digi Selection | Yamasa | Yamasa | April 25, 2002 | Unreleased | Unreleased | | |
| Yamasa Digi Selection 2 | Yamasa | Yamasa | October 24, 2002 | Unreleased | Unreleased | | |
| Yamasa Digi World: Tetra Master | Yamasa | Yamasa | May 24, 2001 | Unreleased | Unreleased | | |
| Yami Fuku Natsu: Teito Monogatari Futatabi | B-Factory | B-Factory | April 8, 1999 | Unreleased | Unreleased | | |
| Yancharu Moncha | Sunsoft | Sunsoft | May 24, 2001 | Unreleased | Unreleased | | |
| Yarudora Series Vol. 1: Double Cast | Sugar and Rockets | SCEI | June 25, 1998 | Unreleased | Unreleased | | |
| Yarudora Series Vol. 2: Kisetsu o Dakishimete | Sugar and Rockets | SCEI | July 23, 1998 | Unreleased | Unreleased | | |
| Yarudora Series Vol. 3: Sampaguita | Sugar and Rockets | SCEI | October 15, 1998 | Unreleased | Unreleased | | |
| Yarudora Series Vol. 4: Yukiwari no Hana | Sugar and Rockets | SCEI | November 26, 1998 | Unreleased | Unreleased | | |
| Yellow Brick Road | Synergy Inc. | Acclaim Japan | August 30, 1996 | Unreleased | Unreleased | | |
| YetiSports Deluxe | Edelweiss | JoWooD Productions | Unreleased | November 12, 2004 | Unreleased | | |
| YetiSports World Tour | Edelweiss | JoWooD Productions | Unreleased | November 12, 2004 | Unreleased | | |
| Yoshimoto Mahjong Club Deluxe | Psikyo | Psikyo | February 11, 1999 | Unreleased | Unreleased | | |
| Yoshimoto Muchicco Dai-kessen | Polygon Magic | Sony Music Entertainment Japan | September 30, 1999 | Unreleased | Unreleased | | |
| Yoshimura Shogi | Konami | Konami | March 26, 1998 | Unreleased | Unreleased | | |
| You Don't Know Jack | Starsphere | Sierra On-Line^{NA}, Rockstar Games^{EU} | Unreleased | April 21, 2001 | October 31, 1999 | | |
| You Don't Know Jack: Mock 2 | Starsphere | Sierra On-Line | Unreleased | Unreleased | November 6, 2000 | | |
| Youchien Gaiden Kareinaru Casino Club: Double Draw | GungHo | Affect | December 21, 2000 | Unreleased | Unreleased | | |
| Youkai Hana Asobi | Unbalance | Unbalance | August 9, 2001 | Unreleased | Unreleased | | |
| Yoyo's Puzzle Park •Gussun Paradise^{JP} | Irem | Irem^{JP}, JVC Music Europe^{PAL} | November 22, 1996 | April 1999 | Unreleased | | |
| Yu-Gi-Oh! Forbidden Memories •Yu-Gi-Oh! Shin Duel Monsters^{JP} | KCEJ | Konami | December 9, 1999 | November 22, 2002 | March 20, 2002 | | |
| Yu-Gi-Oh! Monster Capsule: Breed & Battle | KCES | Konami | July 23, 1998 | Unreleased | Unreleased | | |
| Yukinko Burning | PrincessSoft | PrincessSoft | January 31, 2002 | Unreleased | Unreleased | | |
| Yukyu Gensokyoku | Starlight Marry | Media Works | August 28, 1997 | Unreleased | Unreleased | | |
| Yukyu Gensokyoku 2nd Album | Starlight Marry | Media Works | March 26, 1998 | Unreleased | Unreleased | | |
| Yukyu Gensokyoku 3: Perpetual Blue | Starlight Marry | Media Works | December 22, 1999 | Unreleased | Unreleased | | |
| Yukyu Gensokyoku ensemble (Note: stand-alone expansion for the Yukyu Gensokyoku series.) | Starlight Marry | Media Works | December 10, 1998 | Unreleased | Unreleased | | |
| Yukyu Gensokyoku ensemble 2 (Note: stand-alone expansion for the Yukyu Gensokyoku series.) | Starlight Marry | Media Works | March 4, 1999 | Unreleased | Unreleased | | |
| Yume no Tsubasa | KID | KID | September 28, 2000 | Unreleased | Unreleased | | |
| Yume-Iroiro | Feathered | Feathered | July 30, 1998 | Unreleased | Unreleased | | |
| Yuugen Kaisha Chikyuu Boueitai: Earth Defenders Corporation | Japan Art Media | Media Rings | April 28, 1999 | Unreleased | Unreleased | | |
| Yuukyuu Kumikyoku All Star Project | MediaWorks | MediaWorks | August 24, 2000 | Unreleased | Unreleased | | |
| Yuukyuu no Eden | ASCII Entertainment | ASCII Entertainment | April 22, 1999 | Unreleased | Unreleased | | |
| Yuusha-Ou GaoGaiGar: Blockaded Numbers | Takara | Takara | April 8, 1999 | Unreleased | Unreleased | | |
| Yuuwaku Office Renaika | Japan Media Programming | Takara | July 30, 1998 | Unreleased | Unreleased | | |
| Yuuyami Doori Tankentai | Spike | Spike | October 7, 1999 | Unreleased | Unreleased | | |
| Z | The Bitmap Brothers | GT Interactive | Unreleased | December 1997 | Unreleased | | |
| Zanac X Zanac | Compile | Compile | November 29, 2001 | Unreleased | Unreleased | | |
| ZeiramZone | Tao Human Systems | Banpresto | December 31, 1996 | Unreleased | Unreleased | | |
| Zen-Nippon Pro Wrestling: Ouja no Kon | Human Entertainment | Human Entertainment | April 8, 1999 | Unreleased | Unreleased | | |
| Zera-Chan Puzzle: Pitatto Pair | GungHo | Affect | March 15, 2001 | Unreleased | Unreleased | | |
| Zero4 Champ DooZy-J | Media Kings | Media Kings | June 20, 1997 | Unreleased | Unreleased | | |
| Zero Divide | ZOOM Inc. | Time Warner Interactive^{NA}, Ocean Software^{PAL}, ZOOM Inc.^{JP} | August 25, 1995 | February 10, 1996 | September 9, 1995 | | |
| Zero Divide 2 •Zero Divide 2: The Secret Wish^{JP} | ZOOM Inc. | ZOOM Inc.^{JP}, SCEE^{PAL} | June 27, 1997 | October 15, 1998 | Unreleased | | |
| Zero Kara No Shogi: Shogi Youchien Ayumi-gumi | Affect | Affect | April 8, 1999 | Unreleased | Unreleased | | |
| Zero Pilot: Ginyoku no Senshi | Marionette | SCEI | March 12, 1998 | Unreleased | Unreleased | | |
| Zeus: Carnage Heart Second | Artdink | Artdink | November 5, 1998 | Unreleased | Unreleased | | |
| Zeus II: Carnage Heart | Artdink | Artdink | November 7, 1999 | Unreleased | Unreleased | | |
| Zig Zag Ball | Upstar | Upstar | December 10, 1998 | Unreleased | Unreleased | | |
| Zill O'll | Team-Infinite | Koei | October 7, 1997 | Unreleased | Unreleased | | |
| Zipangu Jima: Unmei wa Saikoro ga Kimeru!? | Human Entertainment | Human Entertainment | October 7, 1999 | Unreleased | Unreleased | | |
| Zoboomafoo: Leapin' Lemurs! | Encore Software, Inc. | Big Grub | Unreleased | Unreleased | October 7, 2001 | | |
| Zoids: Teikoku vs Kyouwakoku - Mecha Seita no Idenshi | Tomy | Tomy | November 22, 2000 | Unreleased | Unreleased | | |
| Zoids Battle Card Game: Seihou Tairiku Senki | Tomy | Tomy | July 26, 2001 | Unreleased | Unreleased | | |
| Zoids 2: Herikku Kyouwakoku vs Gairosu Teikoku | Will | Tomy | February 21, 2002 | Unreleased | Unreleased | | |
| Zoku Gussun Oyoyo | Irem | Banpresto | October 10, 1996 | Unreleased | Unreleased | | |
| Zoku Hatsukoi Monogatari: Shuugaku Ryokou | Koga Game Factory | Tokuma Shoten | March 26, 1998 | Unreleased | Unreleased | | |
| Zoku Mikagura Shōjo Tanteidan ~Kanketsuhen~ | Human Entertainment | Human Entertainment | October 7, 1999 | Unreleased | Unreleased | | |
| Zoop | Hookstone | Viacom New Media | Unreleased | November 22, 1996 | November 20, 1995 | | |
| Zork I: The Great Underground Empire | Shoeisha | Shoeisha | March 15, 1996 | Unreleased | Unreleased | | |
| Zutto Issho: With me Everytime | Beyond Interactive | Toshiba EMI | March 12, 1998 | Unreleased | Unreleased | | |
| ZXE-D: Legend of Plasmalite | | Bandai | December 20, 1996 | Unreleased | Unreleased | | |

== Applications List (M-Z) ==
| Title | Developer(s) | Publisher(s) | Regions released | | | Ref. |
| Title | Developer(s) | Publisher(s) | Japan | Europe/PAL | North America | Ref. |
|---|---|---|---|---|---|---|
| Math Gallery Collection 1 | Lightspan | Lightspan | Unreleased | Unreleased | 1998 | |
| Math Gallery Collection 2 | Lightspan | Lightspan | Unreleased | Unreleased | 1998 | |
| Meka Pokeler | Atlus | Atlus | April 20, 2000 | Unreleased | Unreleased | |
| Mobile Tomodachi | Future Pirates | Hamster | October 17, 2002 | Unreleased | Unreleased | |
| Mizutani Junko: Believer Dreamer | Antinos Records | Antinos Records | June 21, 1996 | Unreleased | Unreleased | |
| MTV Music Generator •Music 2000^{PAL} | Jester Interactive | Codemasters | Unreleased | November 26, 1999; April 6, 2001 | November 30, 1999 | |
| Music | Jester Interactive | Codemasters | Unreleased | November 1998 | Unreleased | |
| Nakajima Miyuki: Namiromu | Exit | Oracion | October 15, 1998 | Unreleased | Unreleased | |
| Neko no Kaikata | Billiken Soft | D3Publisher | April 18, 2002 | Unreleased | Unreleased | |
| Norikae Annai- 2000 Edition | Jourdan | D3Publisher | October 15, 1998 | Unreleased | Unreleased | |
| Ongaku Tsukuru 3 | Enterbrain | Enterbrain | March 8, 2001 | Unreleased | Unreleased | |
| Ongaku Tsukuru: Kanade-Ru 2 | Success | ASCII Entertainment | March 12, 1998 | Unreleased | Unreleased | |
| P.K.'s Math Studio | Lightspan | Lightspan | Unreleased | Unreleased | 1998 | |
| Pao Leeming Kanshuu: Fuusui Nyuumon | Success | Success | January 25, 2001 | Unreleased | Unreleased | |
| Pi to Mail | Hudson Soft | Hudson Soft | February 11, 1999 | Unreleased | Unreleased | |
| Pokeler | Atlus | Atlus | October 28, 1999 | Unreleased | Unreleased | |
| Pokeler DX Black | Atlus | Atlus | April 20, 2000 | Unreleased | Unreleased | |
| Pokeler DX Pink | Atlus | Atlus | April 20, 2000 | Unreleased | Unreleased | |
| PokeTan | Sugar & Rockets | SCEI | October 21, 1999 | Unreleased | Unreleased | |
| Power Stakes | Tose | Aques | April 11, 1997 | Unreleased | Unreleased | |
| Power Stakes 2 | Tose | Aques | April 9, 1998 | Unreleased | Unreleased | |
| Power Stakes Grade 1 | Tose | Aques | October 9, 1997 | Unreleased | Unreleased | |
| Robots: Video Alchemy | Sony Music Entertainment Japan | Sony Music Entertainment Japan | September 9, 1998 | Unreleased | Unreleased | |
| Sakkyoku Surundamon: Dance Remix-hen | Ving | Ving | June 29, 1999 | Unreleased | Unreleased | |
| Seiyou Senseijyutsu | Success | Success | August 26, 1999 | Unreleased | Unreleased | |
| Sentimental Graffiti: Yakusoko | NEC Interchannel | NEC Interchannel | March 29, 2001 | Unreleased | Unreleased | |
| Shi-Hashira Suimyou | Success | Success | September 22, 1999 | Unreleased | Unreleased | |
| Shichu Suimei Pitagraph | Datam Polystar | Datam Polystar | December 29, 1995 | Unreleased | Unreleased | |
| The Shinri Game | Visit | Visit | April 26, 1996 | Unreleased | Unreleased | |
| The Shinri Game IV: Itsumo Shin ni Hoshizora o | Visit | Visit | November 5, 1998 | Unreleased | Unreleased | |
| The Shinri Game 5 | Visit | Visit | December 22, 1999 | Unreleased | Unreleased | |
| The Shinri Game 6 | Visit | Visit | March 23, 2000 | Unreleased | Unreleased | |
| The Shinri Game 7 | Visit | Visit | June 22, 2000 | Unreleased | Unreleased | |
| The Shinri Game 8 | Visit | Visit | September 21, 2000 | Unreleased | Unreleased | |
| The Shinri Game 9 | Visit | Visit | December 21, 2000 | Unreleased | Unreleased | |
| The Shinri Game 10 | Visit | Visit | March 22, 2001 | Unreleased | Unreleased | |
| Simple 1500 Jitsuyou Series Vol. 01: Norikae Annai- 2000 Edition | Jourdan | D3Publisher | October 15, 1998 | Unreleased | Unreleased | |
| Simple 1500 Jitsuyou Series Vol. 02: Katei no Fuusui | | D3Publisher | August 24, 2000 | Unreleased | Unreleased | |
| Simple 1500 Jitsuyou Series Vol. 03: Seimei Handan | Game Stage | D3Publisher | August 24, 2000 | Unreleased | Unreleased | |
| Simple 1500 Jitsuyou Series Vol. 04: Ryouri ~Teiban Ryouri Recipe Shuu~ | Nekogumi | D3Publisher | August 24, 2000 | Unreleased | Unreleased | |
| Simple 1500 Jitsuyou Series Vol. 05: Kusuri no Jiten ~Pill book 2001nen ban~ | | D3Publisher | January 7, 2001 | Unreleased | Unreleased | |
| Simple 1500 Jitsuyou Series Vol. 06: Cocktail no Recipe | | D3Publisher | January 17, 2001 | Unreleased | Unreleased | |
| Simple 1500 Jitsuyou Series Vol. 08: 1jikan de Wakaru Kabushiki Toushi | | D3Publisher | July 26, 2001 | Unreleased | Unreleased | |
| Simple 1500 Jitsuyou Series Vol. 09: Watashi Style no Aromatherapy | Infinity | D3Publisher | July 26, 2001 | Unreleased | Unreleased | |
| Simple 1500 Jitsuyou Series Vol. 10: Tarot Uranai | Vingt-et-un Systems | D3Publisher | October 25, 2001 | Unreleased | Unreleased | |
| Simple 1500 Jitsuyou Series Vol. 11: Katei de Dekiru Tsubo Shiatsu | | D3Publisher | December 13, 2001 | Unreleased | Unreleased | |
| Simple 1500 Jitsuyou Series Vol. 12: Katei no Igaku ~Shindan Jiten~ | | D3Publisher | December 13, 2001 | Unreleased | Unreleased | |
| Simple 1500 Jitsuyou Series Vol. 13: Shinri Game ~Soreike X Kokorojii Kokoro no Uso no Maka Fushigi | | D3Publisher | February 14, 2002 | Unreleased | Unreleased | |
| Simple 1500 Jitsuyou Series Vol. 14: Kurashi no Manner ~Kankonsōsai-hen~ | | D3Publisher | February 14, 2002 | Unreleased | Unreleased | |
| Simple 1500 Jitsuyou Series Vol. 15: Inu no Kaikata ~Sekai no Inu Catalogue~ | | D3Publisher | April 18, 2002 | Unreleased | Unreleased | |
| Simple 1500 Jitsuyou Series Vol. 16: Neko no Kaikata ~Sekai no Neko Catalogue~ | | D3Publisher | April 18, 2002 | Unreleased | Unreleased | |
| Simple 1500 Jitsuyou Series Vol. 17: Planetarium | Highwaystar | D3Publisher | April 18, 2002 | Unreleased | Unreleased | |
| Sister Princess 2 Premium Fan Disc | Stack | Media Works | November 13, 2003 | Unreleased | Unreleased | |
| Sno Pokeler | Atlus | Atlus | April 20, 2000 | Unreleased | Unreleased | |
| Soreike x Kokoroji | Access | Polygram Magic of Japan | November 8, 1996 | Unreleased | Unreleased | |
| Space Adventure Cobra: Galaxy Nights | SCEI | SCEI | February 18, 1998 | Unreleased | Unreleased | |
| Space Adventure Cobra: The Psycogun Vol. 1 | SCEI | SCEI | January 22, 1998 | Unreleased | Unreleased | |
| Space Adventure Cobra: The Psycogun Vol. 2 | SCEI | SCEI | January 22, 1998 | Unreleased | Unreleased | |
| Space MOSA: Southern All Stars Space Museum of Southern Art | Hanson | Hanson | January 22, 1998 | Unreleased | Unreleased | |
| Spawn: The Ultimate | Oracion | Oracion | December 17, 1998 | Unreleased | Unreleased | |
| Story Lane Theater 1 | Lightspan | Lightspan | Unreleased | Unreleased | 1998 | |
| Story Lane Theater 2 | Lightspan | Lightspan | Unreleased | Unreleased | 1998 | |
| Story Lane Theater 3 | Lightspan | Lightspan | Unreleased | Unreleased | 1998 | |
| Story Lane Theater 4 | Lightspan | Lightspan | Unreleased | Unreleased | 1998 | |
| Story Lane Theater 5 | Lightspan | Lightspan | Unreleased | Unreleased | 1998 | |
| Tomoa Yamamoto: Noise Reduction | Antinos Records | Antinos Records | June 21, 1996 | Unreleased | Unreleased | |
| Tomomi Tsumoda: Come and Kiss Me | Antinos Records | Antinos Records | June 21, 1996 | Unreleased | Unreleased | |
| True Love Story Fan Disk | Bits Laboratory | ASCII Entertainment | November 25, 1999 | Unreleased | Unreleased | |
| The Uranai: Renai Seiza Uranai | Visit | Visit | November 11, 1999 | Unreleased | Unreleased | |
| The Uranai 2: Mainichi no Tarot Uranai | Visit | Visit | November 18, 1999 | Unreleased | Unreleased | |
| The Uranai 3: Mainichi no Houi Uranai | Visit | Visit | August 24, 2000 | Unreleased | Unreleased | |
| The Uranai 4: Harapeko Kuma no Kaiun Kabbalah Uranai | Visit | Visit | August 24, 2000 | Unreleased | Unreleased | |
| The Uranai 5: Shinpi no Rune Uranai | Visit | Visit | November 30, 2000 | Unreleased | Unreleased | |
| The Uranai 6: Suisei-san no Tottemo Maruhoshi Senseijutsu | Visit | Visit | November 30, 2000 | Unreleased | Unreleased | |
| Uranai-to Monogatari: Sono I | Ariadne | Tohoku Shinsha | January 19, 1996 | Unreleased | Unreleased | |
| Write Away 1 | Lightspan | Lightspan | Unreleased | Unreleased | 1999 | |
| Write Away 2 | Lightspan | Lightspan | Unreleased | Unreleased | 1999 | |
| Write Away 3 | Lightspan | Lightspan | Unreleased | Unreleased | 1999 | |
| Write Away 4 | Lightspan | Lightspan | Unreleased | Unreleased | 1999 | |
| Write Away 5 | Lightspan | Lightspan | Unreleased | Unreleased | 1999 | |
| Write Away 6 | Lightspan | Lightspan | Unreleased | Unreleased | 1999 | |
| Write Away 7 | Lightspan | Lightspan | Unreleased | Unreleased | 1999 | |
| Write Away 8 | Lightspan | Lightspan | Unreleased | Unreleased | 1999 | |
| Write Away 9 | Lightspan | Lightspan | Unreleased | Unreleased | 1999 | |
| Write Away 10 | Lightspan | Lightspan | Unreleased | Unreleased | 1999 | |
| Yamagata Digital Museum | Infinity | Imagineer | November 18, 1999 | Unreleased | Unreleased | |
| Yaoi Junichi Gokuhi Project UFO Wotsuie!! | Nippon Clary Business | Nippon Clary Business | May 24, 1996 | Unreleased | Unreleased | |
| The Yellow Monkey: Trancemission VJ Remix | Oracion | Hands-On Entertainment | April 14, 2000 | Unreleased | Unreleased | |
| Yukie Nakama: Moonlight to Daybreak | Antinos Records | Antinos Records | June 21, 1996 | Unreleased | Unreleased | |
| Yukiko Morikawa: Because I Love You | Antinos Records | Antinos Records | June 21, 1996 | Unreleased | Unreleased | |
| Zen Super Robot Taisen Denshi Daihyakka | Banpresto | Banpresto | October 29, 1998 | Unreleased | Unreleased | |

== Bundles List (M-Z) ==
| Title | Developer(s) | Publisher(s) | Regions released | | | Ref. |
| Title | Developer(s) | Publisher(s) | Japan | Europe/PAL | North America | Ref. |
|---|---|---|---|---|---|---|
| Math on the Move!: Addition/Subtraction Advanced | Lightspan | Lightspan | Unreleased | Unreleased | 1998 | |
| Math on the Move!: Addition/Subtraction Intermediate | Lightspan | Lightspan | Unreleased | Unreleased | 1998 | |
| Math on the Move!: Multiplication/Division Advanced | Lightspan | Lightspan | Unreleased | Unreleased | 1998 | |
| Math on the Move!: Multiplication/Division Intermediate | Lightspan | Lightspan | Unreleased | Unreleased | 1998 | |
| Metal Gear Solid: Twin Pack | Konami | Konami | Unreleased | 2000 | Unreleased | |
| Nankuro Shuu | Success | Success | February 7, 2002 | Unreleased | Unreleased | |
| Nichibutsu Arcade Classics | Nichibutsu | Nichibutsu | December 29, 1995 | Unreleased | Unreleased | |
| Oekaki Puzzle Shuu | Success | Success | January 24, 2002 | Unreleased | Unreleased | |
| Parlor! Pro Collection | Irem | Nippon Telenet | September 21, 2000 | Unreleased | Unreleased | |
| Parlor! Pro Jr. Collection | Irem | Nippon Telenet | July 13, 2000 | Unreleased | Unreleased | |
| Quiz Shuu | Success | Success | December 20, 2001 | Unreleased | Unreleased | |
| Rayman Brain Games | Aqua Pacific | Ubisoft | Unreleased | Unreleased | August 11, 2001 | |
| Science is Elementary 1 | Lightspan | Lightspan | Unreleased | Unreleased | 1998 | |
| Science is Elementary 2 | Lightspan | Lightspan | Unreleased | Unreleased | 1998 | |
| Science is Elementary 3 | Lightspan | Lightspan | Unreleased | Unreleased | 1998 | |
| Spyro Collector's Edition | Insomniac Games | Sony Computer Entertainment Inc. | Unreleased | Unreleased | May 8, 2002 | |
| Sudoku Shuu | Success | Success | November 29, 2001 | Unreleased | Unreleased | |
| Super Robot Wars Complete Box | WinkySoft | Banpresto | June 10, 1999 | Unreleased | Unreleased | |
| SuperLite 3-in-1: Board Game Shuu | Success | Success | September 26, 2002 | Unreleased | Unreleased | |
| Tokyo Majin Gakuen: Kenpuu Chou Emaki | Shout! Designworks | Asmik Ace Entertainment, Inc | July 13, 2000 | Unreleased | Unreleased | |
| Tomb Raider Collector's Edition | Eidos Interactive | Eidos Interactive | Unreleased | Unreleased | 2002 | |
| Tsuri Shuu | Success | Success | December 20, 2001 | Unreleased | Unreleased | |
| Twilight Syndrome Special | Human Entertainment | Human Entertainment | July 2, 1998 | Unreleased | Unreleased | |
| Yukyu Gensokyoku Hozonhan: Perpetual Collection | Starlight Marry | Media Works | October 14, 1999 | Unreleased | Unreleased | |

== See also ==
- List of PlayStation games (A–L)
