= Cultural depictions of George Washington =

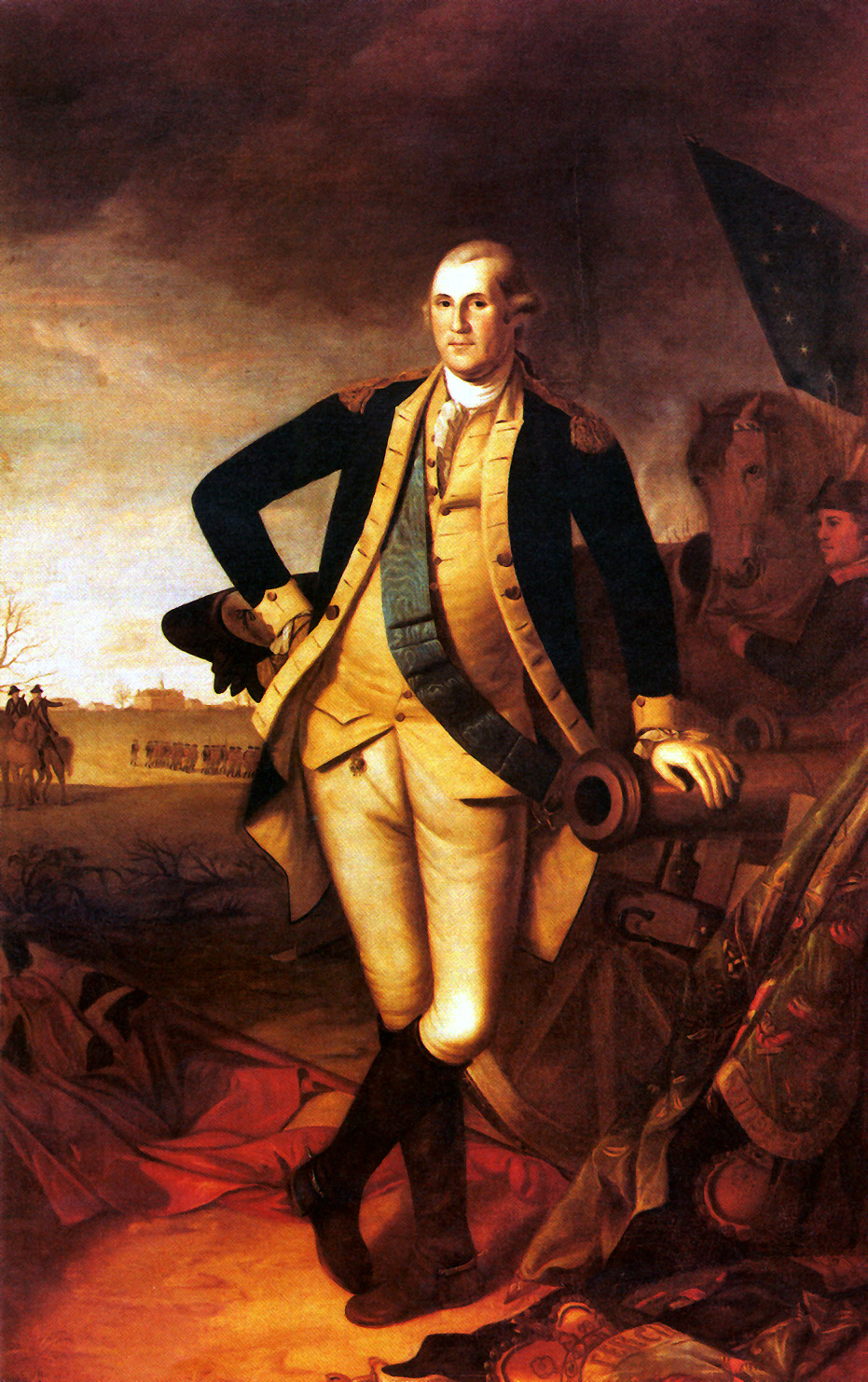
Washington at Princeton, by Charles Willson Peale, 1779

George Washington has inspired artistic and cultural works for more than two hundred years. The following lists cover various media to include items of historic interest, enduring works of high art, and recent representations in popular culture. The entries represent portrayals that a reader has a reasonable chance of encountering rather than a complete catalog. Lesser known works are not included.

For purposes of classification, popular culture music is a separate section from operas and oratorios. Television covers live action series, TV movies, miniseries, and North American animation but not Japanese anime, which appears with manga and graphic novels.

== Art ==
Washington is among the historical figures depicted in Our Nation's 200th Birthday, The Telephone's 100th Birthday (1976) by Stanley Meltzoff for Bell System.

In 2004, the Metropolitan Museum of Art displayed a selection of paintings, drawings, sculpture and decorative arts of George Washington from its collection. It was shown as a complement to its exhibit Gilbert Stuart.

== Gallery ==
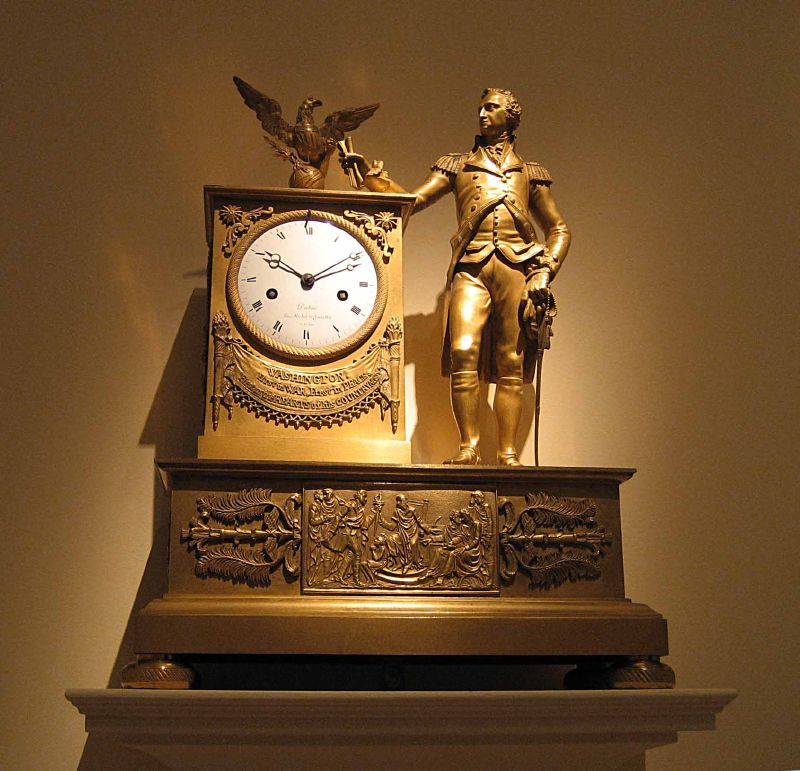
A ca. 1810–1815 French Empire mantel clock, portraying George Washington. In the drapery swag under the dial can be read the famous quote by Henry Lee.

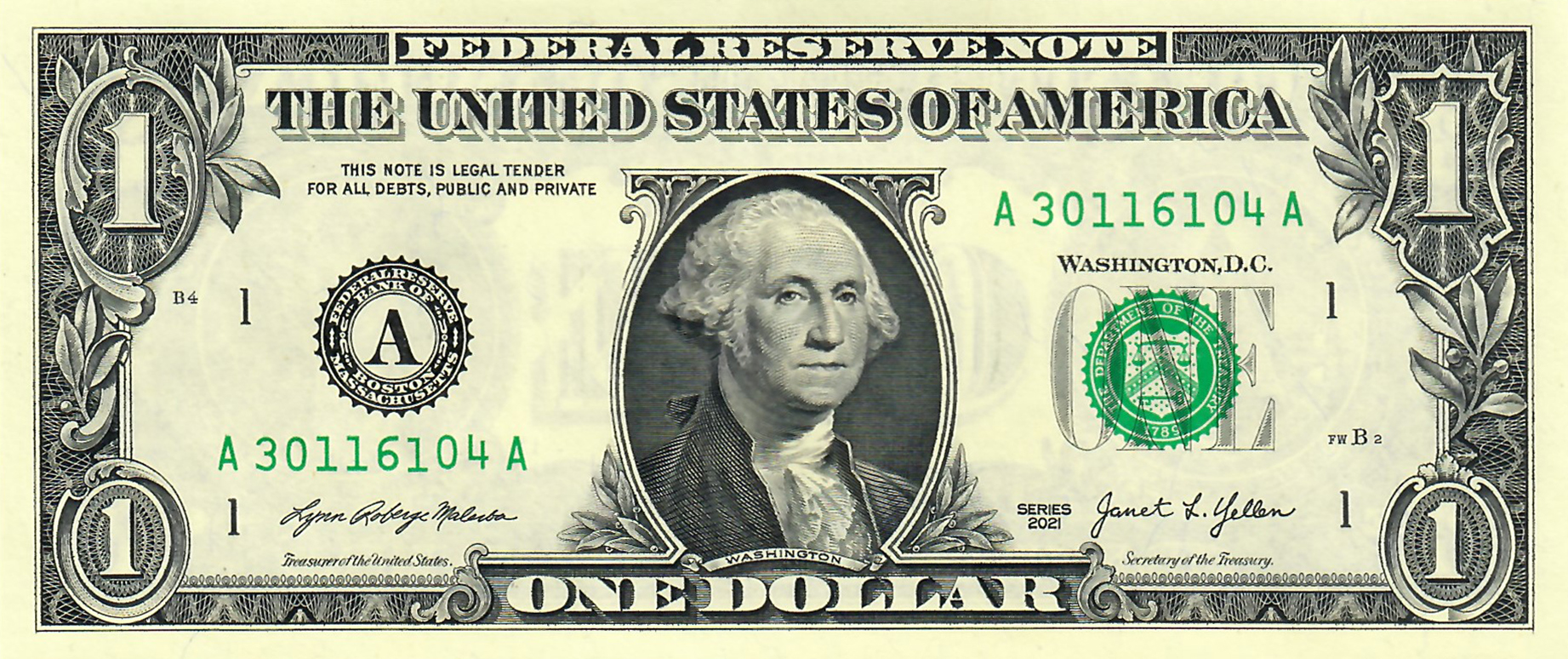
The United States one-dollar bill has George Washington's face on it.

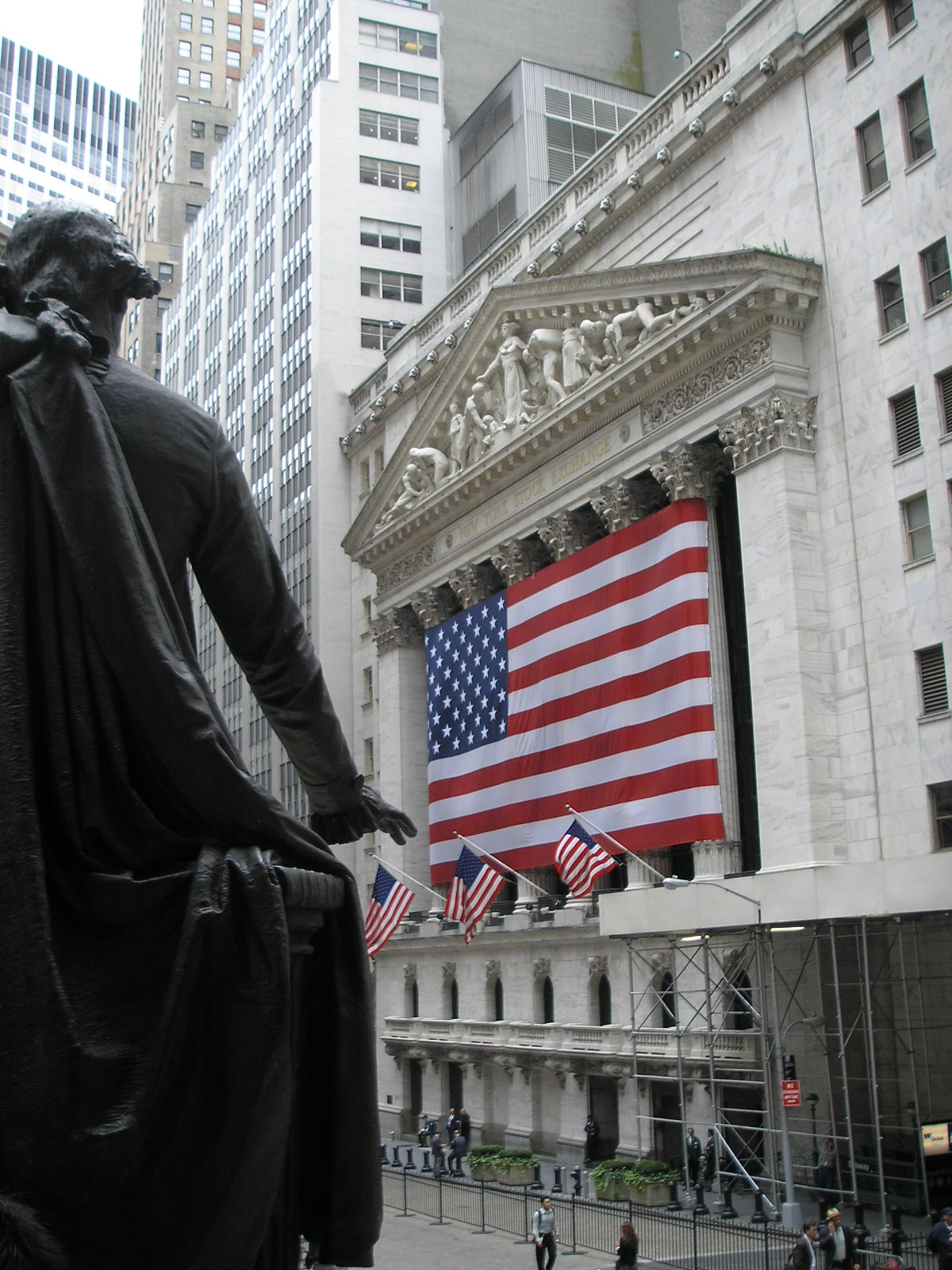
The statue of Washington outside Federal Hall National Memorial, facing Wall Street and the New York Stock Exchange Building in New York City.

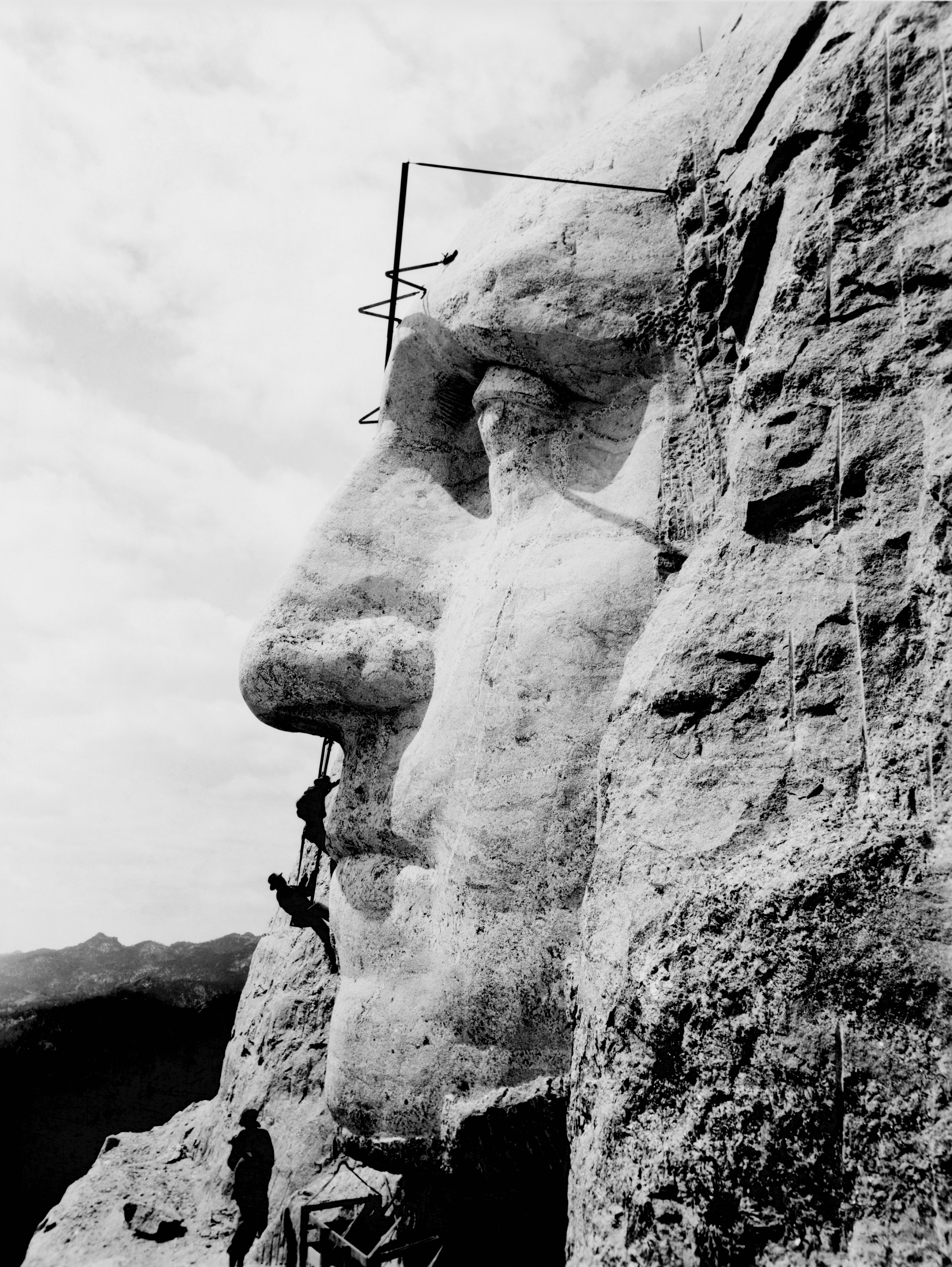
Construction on the George Washington portrait at Mount Rushmore, c. 1932.

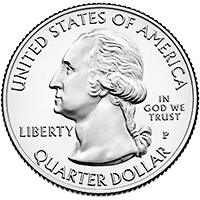
Quarter with profile of Washington bust. He faces left regally and wears a colonial-style queue in his hair. "UNITED STATES OF AMERICA" is at top, "QUARTER DOLLAR" at bottom, "LIBERTY" at left, and "IN GOD WE TRUST" above "P" at right. Just below the bust is "JF uc" in tiny letters.

== Documentaries ==
Date	Title	Portrayer	Country	Notes	IMDB
1994	The American Revolution	Cliff Robertson	USA	Voice role	
2002	Founding Brothers	Brian Dennehy	USA	Voice role	
2007	Searching for George Washington	Martin Sheen	USA	Voice role	
2007	Alexander Hamilton	Richard Easton	USA	Voice role	

== Films ==
Date	Title	Portrayer	Country	Notes	IMDB	Ref.
1909	Washington Under the American Flag	Joseph Kilgour	USA	Directed by J. Stuart Blackton		
1909	Washington Under the British Flag	Joseph Kilgour	USA	Directed by J. Stuart Blackton		
1915	The Battle Cry of Peace	Joseph Kilgour	USA	Directed by J. Stuart Blackton and Wilfrid North		
1916	The Dawn of Freedom	Joseph Kilgour	USA	Directed by Theodore Marston and Paul Scardon		
1917	The Spirit of '76	William Beery	USA	Directed by Frank Montgomery		
1924	Yorktown	George Nash	USA	Black and white silent film directed by Webster Campbell		
1924	America	Arthur Dewey	USA	Directed by D.W. Griffith		
1927	The Flag	Francis X. Bushman	USA	Directed by Arthur Maude		
1931	Alexander Hamilton	Alan Mowbray	USA	Directed by John G. Adolfi		
1932	The Phantom President	Alan Mowbray	USA	Directed by Norman Taurog		
1936	Give Me Liberty	Robert Warwick	USA	Directed by B. Reeves Eason		
1939	Sons of Liberty	Montagu Love	USA	Directed by Michael Curtiz		
1940	The Howards of Virginia	George Houston	USA	Directed by Frank Lloyd		
1942	The Remarkable Andrew	Montagu Love	USA	Directed by Stuart Heisler		
1945	Where Do We Go from Here?	Alan Mowbray	USA	Directed by Gregory Ratoff		
1946	Monsieur Beaucaire	Douglass Dumbrille	USA	Directed by George Marshall		
1947	Unconquered	Richard Gaines	USA	Directed by Cecil B. DeMille		
1951	When the Redskins Rode	James Seay	USA	Directed by Lew Landers		
1959	John Paul Jones	John Crawford	USA / Spain	Directed by John Farrow		
1961	La Fayette	Howard St. John	France / Italy	Directed by Jean Dréville		
1976	Independence	Patrick O'Neal	USA	Directed by John Huston		
2000	The Patriot	Terry Layman	USA	Directed by Roland Emmerich		
2006	We Fight to Be Free	Sebastian Roché	USA	Directed by Kees Van Oostrum		
2008	An American Carol	Jon Voight	USA	Directed by David Zucker		
2014	Mr. Peabody & Sherman	Jess Harnell	USA	Directed by Rob Minkoff		
2015	Beyond the Mask	John Arden McClure	USA	Directed by Chad Burns		
2021	America: The Motion Picture	Channing Tatum	USA	Directed by Matt Thompson		
	The General		USA			
	The Virginian		USA	Directed by Jason Hall		
2026	Young Washington	William Franklyn-Miller	USA	Directed by Jon Erwin		

== Television ==
Date	Title	Portrayer	Country	Notes	IMDB
1952	Hallmark Hall of Fame The Plot to Kidnap George Washington	Tod Griffin	USA		
1955	You Are There Washington Crosses the Delaware (December 25, 1776) CBS	Russ Conway	USA		
1972	Bewitched George Washington Zapped Here (Parts 1 and 2)	Will Geer	USA		
1975	The Muppet Show: Sex and Violence	Jim Henson	USA	Featured a Muppet version of George Washington	
1989	A Little Bit Strange	—N/a	USA/Canada		
1998–2001	Histeria!	—N/a	USA	Featured a caricature of Washington modeled after Bob Hope as an occasional guest host.	
1999	Celebrity DeathMatch	—N/a	USA	Faced-off against Abraham Lincoln	
2007	Masters of Horror "The Washingtonians"	—N/a	USA	Washington is portrayed as a cannibal in a fictional account of alternate history.	
2011	Deadliest Warrior	Nick Schroeder (young)	USA	In the third-season premiere, Washington battled Napoleon.	
2013–2014	Sleepy Hollow	Louis Herthum	USA		
2014	Epic Rap Battles of History	Peter Shukoff	USA	YouTube web series; episode "George Washington vs. William Wallace".	
2014	Ben 10: Omniverse	David Kaye	USA	Voice role	
2014–2017	Turn: Washington's Spies	Ian Kahn	USA		
2015	Turn: Washington's Spies	Bryan Adrian	USA		
2016	Timeless	Damian O'Hare	USA		
2017	Legends of Tomorrow	Randall Batinkoff	USA	Two episodes	
2018	Outlander	Simon Harrison	Scotland/USA	Episode "Wilmington"	

=== Television movies ===
Date	Title	Portrayer	Country	Notes	IMDB	Ref.
1975	Valley Forge	Richard Basehart	USA	TV movie directed by Fielder Cook		
1976	The Patriots	Ralph Clanton	USA	TV movie directed by Bob Hankal and Robert Strane		
1979	The Rebels	Peter Graves	USA	TV movie directed by Russ Mayberry		
1992	1775	Adam West	USA	TV movie directed by David Trainer		
2000	The Crossing	Jeff Daniels	USA	TV movie directed by Robert Harmonstarring		
2003	Benedict Arnold: A Question of Honor	Kelsey Grammer	USA	TV movie directed by Mikael Salomon		

=== Miniseries ===
Date	Title	Portrayer	Country	Notes	IMDB
1984	George Washington	Barry Bostwick	USA	TV miniseries directed by Buzz Kulik	
1986	George Washington II: The Forging of a Nation	Barry Bostwick	USA	TV miniseries directed by William A. Graham	
1997	LIBERTY! The American Revolution	Stephen Lang (voice)	USA	TV miniseries directed by Ellen Hovde and Muffie Meyer	
2000	Founding Fathers	Brian Dennehy (voice)	USA	TV miniseries directed by Mark Hufnail and Melissa Jo Peltier	
2000	The American President	Walter Cronkite (voice)	USA	TV miniseries directed by Philip Kunhardt III, Philip Kunhardt Jr., Peter W. Kunhardt, and James A. Edgar	
2002	Liberty's Kids	Michael Santo (voice)	USA	TV animated series	
2006	Washington the Warrior	Jackson Bolt, Shea Patrick (young)	USA	TV miniseries directed by Robert M. Wise	
2006	The War That Made America	Larry Nehring	USA	TV miniseries directed by Ben Loeterman and Eric Stange	
2008	John Adams	David Morse	USA	TV miniseries directed by Tom Hooper starring David Morse as Washington	
2015	Sons of Liberty	Jason O'Mara	USA	TV miniseries	
2020	Washington	Nicholas Rowe	USA	TV miniseries	

== Theatre ==
Date	Title	Portrayers	Country	Notes	IMDB
1920	George Washington	Walter Hampden	USA	Ran for 16 performances	
2015	Hamilton	Christopher Jackson, Nicholas Christopher, Isaiah Johnson	USA	Musical based on the life of Alexander Hamilton, written by Lin Manuel-Miranda. Washington features as a main character in the musical. A digital recording of the musical is available on Disney+.	

== Video games ==
George Washington is featured in modern video games as a prominent fictionalized character from world history in Age of Empires III, Civilization V and Assassin's Creed III (as himself in game and a counter-history King in DLC). These games are discussed in Winnerling and Kershbaumer's Early Modernity and Video Games explaining that the player manipulating the games' semiotic system of communications thereby "gives insights in his historical consciousness."

Date	Title	Portrayer	Country	Notes	IMDB	Ref.
1991	Bill & Ted's Excellent Video Game Adventure	—N/a	USA	One of the historical figures that must be retrieved within the game.		
1993	Day of the Tentacle	—N/a	USA	A character that travels to the past meets George Washington, and among other things, "converts" a kumquat tree to a cherry tree for George to cut down		
1993	Mario's Time Machine	—N/a	USA			
1994	Liberty or Death	—N/a	Japan, USA			
2004	The Political Machine	—N/a	USA			
2005	Age of Empires III	Daniel Riordan	USA	Voice role		
2005	Civilization IV	—N/a	USA			
2007	Age of Empires III: The WarChiefs	Daniel Riordan	USA	Voice role		
2008	The Political Machine 2008	—N/a	USA			
2008	Civilization IV: Colonization	—N/a	USA			
2009	Scribblenauts	—N/a	USA	Washington also appears in a similar fashion in all of the sequels to Scribblenauts.		
2009	Empire: Total War	—N/a	USA	Washington is a selectable general for the United States faction		
2010	Civilization V	Marcel Jeanin	USA	Voice role		
2012	The Political Machine 2012	—N/a	USA			
2012	Assassin's Creed III	Robin Atkin Downes	Canada	Voice role. Ratonhnhaké:ton interacts with Washington during the course of the American Revolution.		
2012	Assassin's Creed III: The Tyranny of King Washington	Robin Atkin Downes	Canada	Voice role. Revolves around an alternative history, wherein Washington becomes corrupted by an ancient artifact, and dubs himself King.		
2013	BioShock Infinite	—N/a		Patriot robots are modeled after George Washington.		
2014	Team Fortress 2	—N/a	USA	George Washington is featured in a comic called A Cold Day in Hell.		
2014	Second Chance Heroes	—N/a	USA, Canada	George Washington is featured in a comic book introduction to the game.		
2014	Assassin's Creed: Rogue	Tod Fennell	Bulgaria	Voice role. A young Washington briefly appears during a party for his half-brother, Lawrence.		
2016	The Political Machine 2016	—N/a	USA			
2018	The Council	Christian Erickson	France	Voice role		
2020	The Political Machine 2020	—N/a	USA			
2020	Age of Empires III: Definitive Edition	Daniel Riordan	USA	Voice role		
2021	Funko Pop! Blitz		USA			
2025	Electoral Carnage	—N/a	USA			

== Internet ==
Date	Title	Portrayer	Country	Notes	IMDB	Ref.
2014	Epic Rap Battles of History	Peter Shukoff	USA	Washington features in a rap battle against Scottish resistance leader William Wallace.		

== See also ==
- George Washington
- George Washington on U.S. postage stamps
  - Washington-Franklin postage stamps
- List of paintings of George Washington
- List of statues of George Washington
- List of memorials to George Washington
- Hamilton (2015 musical)
- Valley Forge play
