= The Political Machine =

2004 video game

- Developer: Stardock
- Publisher: Ubisoft
- Platform: Microsoft Windows
- Release: NA: August 10, 2004
- Genre: Government simulation
- Modes: Single-player, multiplayer

The Political Machine is a government simulation game from Stardock and the first game in the Political Machine series, in which the player leads a campaign to elect the President of the United States. The player accomplishes this goal by traveling from state to state and engaging in a variety of activities to either raise money or raise poll numbers. Each game starts with the selection of a pre-created candidate or creation of a fictional candidate from one of the two major American political parties, the Republican Party and the Democratic Party. Headquarters and fundraisers are possible, the effectiveness of which depends on various factors.

When enough money is accumulated the player can invest it in advertisements (either through newspapers, radio, or TV media). The effectiveness of these ads are determined by several factors. For instance, an ad supporting tax cuts will work better with Republican Texas than with Democratic Massachusetts. A key factor in the game is the concept of "Stamina" and "Turns". In each turn, representing one week, a candidate has a set amount of stamina to engage in activities. For example, establishing or upgrading a campaign HQ costs more stamina than creating a newspaper ad.

== Candidates ==
=== Basic candidates ===
==== Democrats ====
Chloe Sullivan has several strong areas as a candidate but lacks experience.

- Bill Clinton
- Hillary Clinton
- John Edwards
- Al Gore
- Jeffory Jackson (fictitious character based on politician and 1984 and 1988 presidential candidate Jesse Jackson)
- John Kerry
- Chloe Sullivan (fictitious character, possibly named after a character from the television series Smallville)
- Tom Vilsack

==== Republican ====
- Barbara Bush
- George H. W. Bush
- George W. Bush
- Laura Bush
- Dick Cheney
- Mike Forbes (fictitious character based on 1996 and 2000 presidential candidate Steve Forbes)
- Bill Mason (although there is a Bill Mason, he is not related to politics; the computer game character is based on the 1996 Republican presidential nominee Bob Dole)
- Condoleezza Rice
- Arnold Schwarzenegger (actually ineligible for the office of U.S. President; see § Presidential ambitions)

=== Unlockable candidates ===
These candidates have to be defeated by a member of the opposite party in Campaign Mode in order to unlock them.

==== Democratic ====
- Wesley Clark
- Jimmy Carter
- Bill Richardson
- Dick Gephardt
- Lyndon B. Johnson
- Woodrow Wilson (mislabeled as from Georgia; although he spent much of his childhood there, Wilson was elected from New Jersey, where he served as governor)
- Franklin D. Roosevelt
- Thomas Jefferson (member of the Democratic-Republicans, predecessors to the Democrats and the Whigs, and in turn the Republicans)

==== Republican ====
- William Howard Taft
- Gerald Ford
- Ulysses S. Grant
- Richard Nixon
- Theodore Roosevelt (mislabeled as from Ohio)
- Ronald Reagan
- Abraham Lincoln
- George Washington (sympathetic to the Federalists, predecessors to the Whigs, and in turn the Republicans)

== Legacy ==
A sequel, The Political Machine 2008, was released on June 24, 2008. A second sequel, The Political Machine 2012, was released on July 31, 2012. A third sequel, The Political Machine 2016, was released on February 4, 2016. A fourth sequel, The Political Machine 2020, was released on March 3, 2020. A fifth sequel, The Political Machine 2024, was released on May 2, 2024.

== Reception ==
Reception

Aggregate score
Aggregator	Score
Metacritic	72/100

Review scores
Publication	Score
1Up.com	C
Computer Gaming World	4.5/5
Game Informer	7/10
GameRevolution	C−
GameSpot	7.4/10
GameSpy	4/5
GameZone	7.5/10
IGN	7.9/10
PC Format	82%
PC Gamer (US)	73%

The game received "average" reviews according to video game review aggregator Metacritic.

The editors of Computer Gaming World nominated The Political Machine as their 2004 "Strategy Game of the Year (General)", although it lost to The Sims 2. They wrote, "[W]e were enamored with Stardock's The Political Machine, which let us run the 2004 presidential campaign in a way that was far more fun than its real-life counterpart." The Political Machine won Computer Games Magazine's 2004 "Best Budget Game" award.
