= Atli Örvarsson =

Icelandic composer

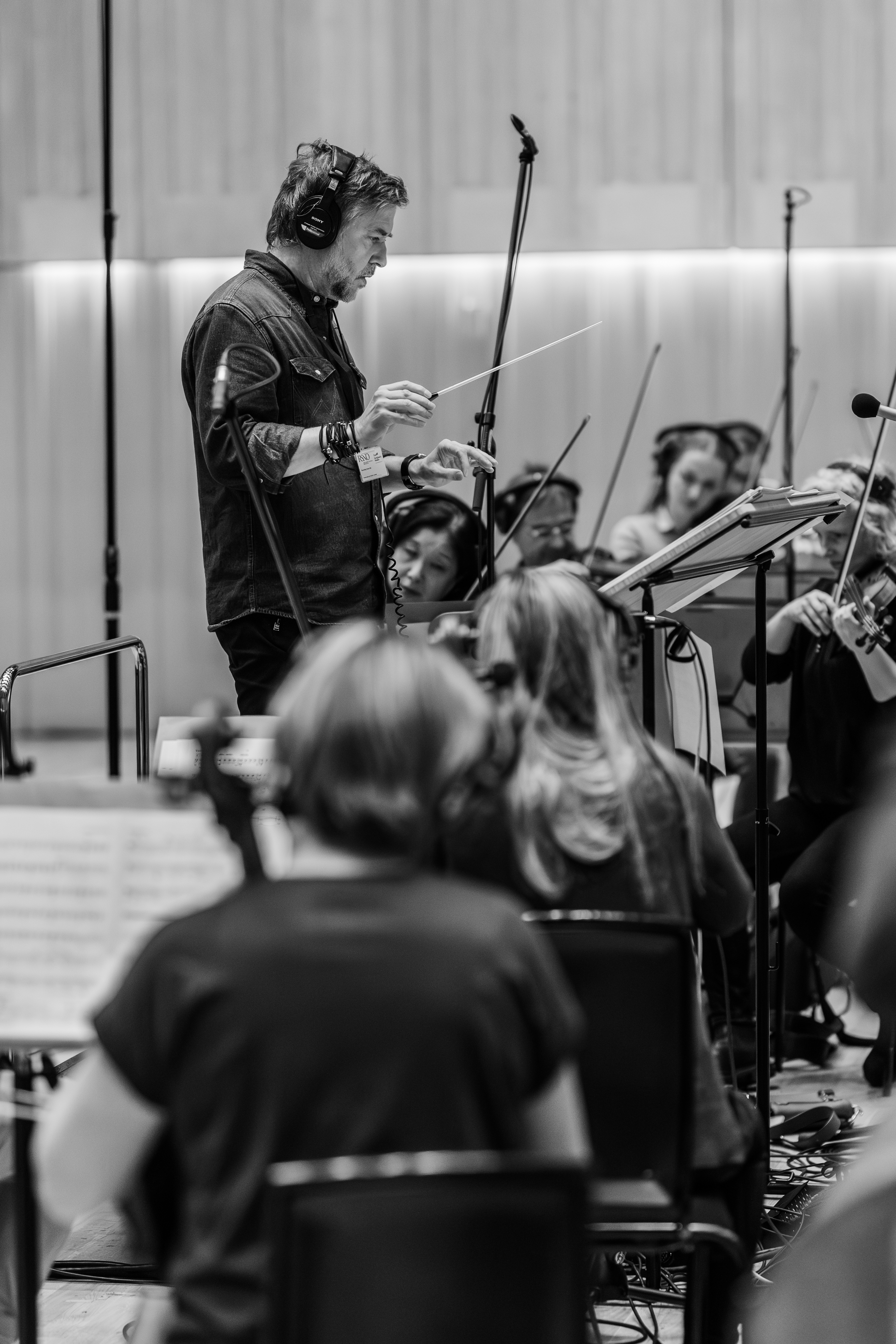
- Atli Örvarsson conducting in a recording session in 2024

Background information
- Origin: Akureyri, Iceland
- Genre: Film scores
- Occupations: Composer; conductor; musician; songwriter
- Instruments: Percussion; keys
- Years active: 2000–present
- Website: atlimusic.com

Atli Örvarsson (Icelandic pronunciation: [ˈaʰtlɪ ˈœrvar̥sɔn]) is an Icelandic-American film score composer. Atli's credits include composing and orchestrating music for some of Hollywood's biggest projects, including the Pirates of the Caribbean series, Angels & Demons, The Holiday, The Eagle, Vantage Point, Babylon A.D., Thick as Thieves, The Fourth Kind, and Season of the Witch. Atli's most recent credits include Apple TV's Silo and Defending Jacob, The Mortal Instruments: City of Bones, Hansel & Gretel: Witch Hunters, A Single Shot, NBC series Chicago Fire, and together with Hans Zimmer contributed music to the Zack Snyder Superman reinstallment Man of Steel.

Originally from the small town of Akureyri, Atli became established in the local music scene at a young age. He earned three platinum and two gold records as a member of the Icelandic band Sálin hans Jóns míns before studying film composing at Berklee College of Music and the University of North Carolina School of the Arts. He excelled in composing and was awarded the Pete Carpenter Fellowship, which brought him to Los Angeles. He began working alongside TV veteran Mike Post on NYPD Blue and three Law & Order brands. Atli soon caught the attention of composer Hans Zimmer, who extended an invitation to join his team at Remote Control Productions.

== Filmography ==
=== Film ===
Year	Title	Director	Notes
2005	Stuart Little 3: Call of the Wild	Audu Paden	
2007	The Last Confederate: The Story of Robert Adams	A. Blaine Miller	
2008	Vantage Point	Pete Travis	
2008	Babylon A.D.	Mathieu Kassovitz	
2009	Thick as Thieves	Mimi Leder	
2009	The Fourth Kind	Olatunde Osunsanmi	
2011	Season of the Witch	Dominic Sena	
2011	The Eagle	Kevin Macdonald	
2013	Hansel & Gretel: Witch Hunters	Tommy Wirkola	
2013	The Mortal Instruments: City of Bones	Harald Zwart	
2013	A Single Shot	David M. Rosenthal	
2015	The Perfect Guy	David M. Rosenthal	Co-composed with David Fleming
2015	Rams	Grímur Hákonarson	
2016	Bilal: A New Breed of Hero	Khurram H. Alavi; Ayman Jamal	
2016	The Edge of Seventeen	Kelly Fremon Craig	
2017	The Hitman's Bodyguard	Patrick Hughes	
2018	How It Ends	David M. Rosenthal	
2019	Jacob's Ladder	David M. Rosenthal	
2020	Eurovision Song Contest: The Story of Fire Saga	David Dobkin	
2021	Hitman's Wife's Bodyguard	Patrick Hughes	
2022	No Limit	David M. Rosenthal	
2025	Dongji Rescue	Guan Hu, Fei Zhenxiang	
2026	Ladies First	Thea Sharrock	

=== Television ===
Year	Title	Network	Notes
2002, 2005	Law & Order: Criminal Intent	NBC	Co-composed with Mike Post
2003–2004	L.A. Dragnet	ABC	Co-composed with Mike Post
2006	Six Degrees	ABC	Co-composed with Michael Giacchino & Adam Cohen
2010	Law & Order: Los Angeles	NBC	Theme music composed by Mike Post
2012–present	Chicago Fire	NBC	
2014–present	Chicago P.D.	NBC	
2015–present	Chicago Med	NBC	
2017	Chicago Justice	NBC	
2019–present	FBI	CBS	
2020–present	FBI: Most Wanted	CBS	
2020	Defending Jacob	Apple TV+	Theme music composed by Ólafur Arnalds
2022	Unprecedented	Discovery+	
2023–present	Silo	Apple TV+	
2025	On Call	Prime Video	
