= Kevin Ridger =

British actor

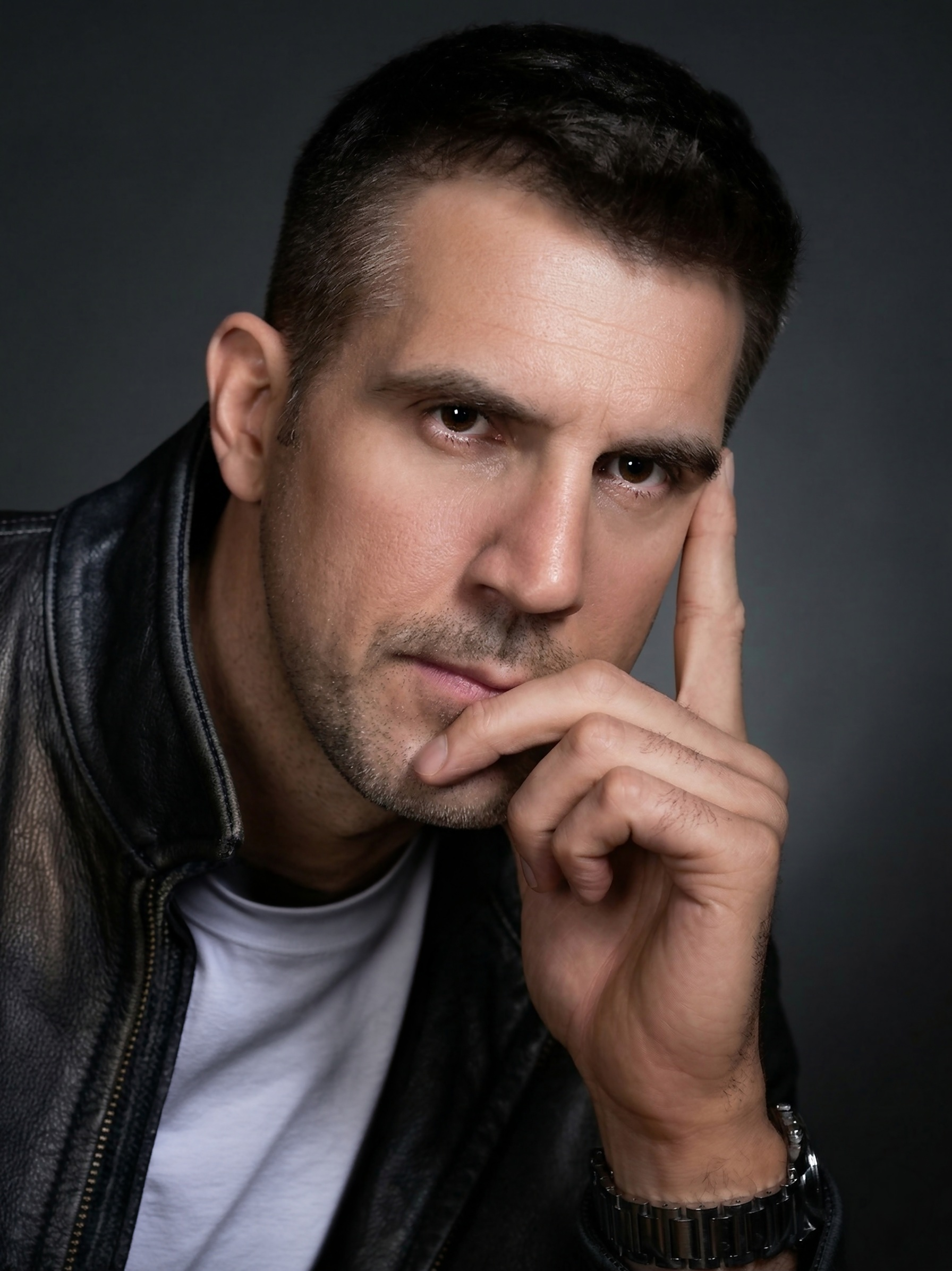
- Kevin Ridger
- Born: Cambridge, England
- Occupation: Actor
- Years active: 2005–present
- Notable work: Wolf Warrior, The Battle at Lake Changjin, Sniper, Formed Police Unit, Marco Polo, Dongji Rescue

Kevin Ridger, formerly known as Kevin Lee, is a British actor who began his acting career in China. He has played roles in films directed by Jackie Chan, Zhang Yimou, and Wu Jing, often portraying villains or military figures. His works include Wolf Warrior, The Battle at Lake Changjin, Sniper, Formed Police Unit, and playing a knight in the Netflix series Marco Polo. He also appeared in S.W.A.T. (2019) starring Robert Knepper.

In 2025 Ridger made a career pivot with the historical war drama Dongji Rescue, based on the Lisbon Maru incident. He plays Lieutenant Colonel Stewart, a British POW rescued by Chinese fishermen, a role that marked his first on-screen portrayal of a heroic character. Co-directed by Guan Hu and Fei Zhenxiang, the film premiered in China on 8 August 2025 and is slated for international release.

Following the film's release, Ridger's online content—including behind-the-scenes reflections and reputation-driven storytelling—has amassed over 30 million views across social media platforms.

== Early life ==
Kevin was born in Cambridge, United Kingdom. As a child he enjoyed watching Chinese martial arts films featuring Jackie Chan, Bruce Lee, and Jet Li.

He earned a degree in IT before deciding to study Chinese martial arts in Mudanjiang, Heilongjiang, China. He later returned to the UK, worked as a salesman and financial consultant, and eventually trained as an actor before returning to China in 2010.

== Film career ==
Ridger says that he met director Wu Jing while renewing his work visa at the Public Security Bureau in Beijing. He went on to star in Wu Jing's Wolf Warrior (2015), the first in the patriotic Wolf Warrior franchise, and later featured in Stanley Tong's Kung Fu Yoga (2016) and Zhang Chong's Super Me (2019). Ridger is widely recognized for portraying Crazy Bull in Wolf Warrior and American colonel Allan Maclean in The Battle at Lake Changjin (2021). He was cast in Zhang Yimou’s Sniper (2022).

His breakout heroic role came in 2025 with Dongji Rescue, playing a real-life British POW. The film marked a turning point in Ridger's public perception, with its emotional weight and historical legacy bringing him praise from international audiences and media.
