= Al Clark (producer) =

Australian film producer

Al Clark is an Australian film producer. He is best known for his producer role on The Adventures of Priscilla, Queen of the Desert and his executive producer role on the film, Chopper. Clark is also the author of four books. Time Flies and Time Flies Too are Clark's memoirs, which merge the early days of punk and new wave popular music with the truncated British film renaissance of the 1980s and the world of international film finance, and later chronicle his move to Australia and his work there. Clark's first book Raymond Chandler in Hollywood provides an insight into the work of the writer of detective fiction and includes interviews with many of the Hollywood figures who were associated with Raymond Chandler and his films. His second book Making Priscilla, also titled The Lavender Bus: How a Hit Movie Was Made and Sold, is a behind-the-scenes tale outlining the follies of film-making and how The Adventures of Priscilla, Queen of the Desert became an international success.

== Early life and education ==
Clark was born in Huelva, Andalucia, in southern Spain, and grew up there during the time of Franco's dictatorship, a childhood Clark described as extreme and intense.

He and his sister Lesley were home schooled by their mother, a former Glasgow school teacher. Fluent in Spanish, his parents were the only people he spoke English to until the age of 9 when he was sent to a boarding school in Scotland.

== Career ==
=== UK ===
Clark first worked as a journalist at Time Out in London before becoming Publicity Director at Virgin Records. It was here that he represented the Sex Pistols, Phil Collins, Mike Oldfield and Tangerine Dream.

His working life in London from 1971 – 1987 was dominated by Tony Elliott, founder, publisher and editor of Time Out magazine UK and Richard Branson, Founder at Virgin Group.

Over his time with Virgin and during the early years when the company expanded into different fields, Clark worked as a Publicity Director, a Book Editor for Virgin Books, Virgin's first Head of Creative Affairs and Head of Production for Virgin Films. Oscar winner, A Shocking Accident, starring Rupert Everett and Jenny Seagrove was made in association with Virgin Films. Clark's first six films produced under the Virgin umbrella include: Nineteen Eighty-Four directed by Michael Radford and starring John Hurt and Richard Burton, Absolute Beginners directed by Julien Temple and starring David Bowie and James Fox and Gothic directed by Ken Russell and starring Gabriel Byrne, Natasha Richardson and Timothy Spall.

=== Australia ===
Clark was the executive producer for The Crossing directed by George Ogilvie and starring Russell Crowe and Danielle Spencer. He worked as a Commissioner on the AFC Board for a 3-year term 1989 - 1992. Clark served on the Screen Australia board from December 2014 - December 2017. In 1994 Clark produced the award-winning feature film, The Adventures of Priscilla, Queen of the Desert - Director, Stephan Elliott and starring Terence Stamp, Hugo Weaving and Guy Pearce. Together with his wife, Andrena Finlay, Clark owns and operates Wildheart Films. Their credits include: Executive Producer, Thunderstruck, Producer, Red Hill, and Producer, Swinging Safari. Clark has served as Jury Member at several film festivals including: Jury President, Adelaide Film Festival, 2013, Jury Member, San Sebastian International Film Festival 2003 and Jury Member Valladolid International Film Festival, 1999.

== Personal life ==
Clark has married twice. His first marriage was to Yoli with whom he had two children - Jason and Louise. They divorced in the early 1980s. Al met his second wife, Australian producer Andrena Finlay, at the Cannes Film Festival in 1983 and again in 1986. Following that second meeting, Clark moved to Australia and married Finlay in December 1987. Clark and Finlay have two children – Rachel and Jamie.

== Filmography ==
- 1984 - Secret Places (executive producer) – director Zelda Barron – with Marie-Therese Relin, Jenny Agutter
- 1984 - Nineteen Eighty-Four (co-producer) – director Michael Radford – with John Hurt, Richard Burton
- 1986 - Absolute Beginners (executive producer) – director Julien Temple – with David Bowie, James Fox
- 1986 - Captive (executive producer) – director Paul Mayersberg – with Oliver Reed, Irina Brook
- 1986 - Gothic (executive producer) – director Ken Russell – with Gabriel Byrne, Natasha Richardson, Timothy Spall
- 1987 - Aria (co-producer) – directors Robert Altman, Jean-Luc Godard, Nicolas Roeg, Bruce Beresford etc. – with Theresa Russell, Bridget Fonda, Tilda Swinton
- 1990 - The Crossing (executive producer) – director George Ogilvie – with Russell Crowe, Danielle Spencer
- 1994 - The Adventures of Priscilla, Queen of the Desert (producer) – director Stephan Elliott – with Terence Stamp, Hugo Weaving, Guy Pearce
- 1997 - Heaven's Burning (producer) – director Craig Lahiff – with Russell Crowe, Youki Kudoh
- 1999 - Siam Sunset (producer) – director John Polson – with Linus Roache, Danielle Cormack
- 1999 - Eye of the Beholder (co-producer) – director Stephan Elliott – with Ewan McGregor, Ashley Judd
- 2000 - Chopper (executive producer) – director Andrew Dominik – with Eric Bana, Vince Colosimo, Kate Beahan
- 2002 - The Hard Word (producer) – director Scott Roberts – with Guy Pearce, Rachel Griffiths, Joel Edgerton
- 2004 - Thunderstruck (executive producer) – director Darren Ashton – with Sam Worthington, Callan Mulvey, Stephen Curry
- 2006 - The Book of Revelation (producer) – director Ana Kokkinos – with Tom Long, Greta Scacchi, Colin Friels
- 2007 - Razzle Dazzle (executive producer) – director Darren Ashton – with Ben Miller, Kerry Armstrong, Tara Morice
- 2009 - Blessed (producer) – director Ana Kokkinos – with Frances O’Connor, Miranda Otto, Deborra-lee Furness
- 2010 - Red Hill (producer) – director Patrick Hughes – with Ryan Kwanten, Steve Bisley, Tom E. Lewis
- 2013 - Goddess (executive producer) – director Mark Lamprell - with Laura Michelle Kelly, Ronan Keating, Magda Szubanski
- 2017 - Swinging Safari aka Flammable Children (producer) - director Stephan Elliott - with Guy Pearce, Kylie Minogue, Radha Mitchel

== Awards ==
- In 2013 Clark received the AACTA Lifetime Achievement Award, the Longford Lyell Award for his unwavering excellence and commitment to the film industry.
- Blessed, 2009 (Producer Al Clark, Director Ana Kokkinos) nominated for AFI Best Film.
- Chopper, 2000 (Executive Producer Al Clark, Director Andrew Dominik). The film won: Cognac Film Festival - Grand Prix and Best Film awarded by the Film Critics Circle of Australia, it was also nominated by AFI Best Film.
- Siam Sunset, 1999 (Producer Al Clark, Director John Polson) won: Festival de Cannes - Rail D'Or; Busan Film Festival - Best Film; Hawaii Film Festival - Golden Maile, Best Film; Oporto Film Festival - Best Film Fantasporto. The film was also nominated for AFI Best Film.
- In 1994 The Adventures of Priscilla, Queen of the Desert (Producer Al Clark, Director Stephan Elliott) won the following awards. Festival de Cannes - Grand Prix du Publique; San Francisco International Film Festival - Starbucks Award, Most Popular Film; Seattle Film Festival - Golden Space Needle Award, Most Popular Film. The film also won the EDI Award for Highest Grossing Limited Release Film in the US in 1994. Nominations include Golden Globes - Best Picture, Musical or Comedy, BAFTA - Best Film and AFI - Best Film.
- The 1987 UK anthology film, Aria was nominated for the Festival de Cannes Palme d'Or.
- In 1984 - 1985 the film Nineteen Eighty-Four (Director Michael Radford) won Best Film, Evening Standard British Film Awards and a Golden Tulip, Istanbul International Film Festival.

== See also ==
- Cinema of Australia
