= Dongji Rescue =

- Theatrical release poster
- Simplified Chinese: 东极岛
- Traditional Chinese: 東極島
- Hanyu Pinyin: Dōngjí Dǎo
- Directed by: Guan Hu; Fei Zhenxiang
- Written by: Chen Shu; Zhang Ji; Dong Runnian
- Produced by: Liang Jing
- Starring: Zhu Yilong; Leo Wu; Ni Ni
- Cinematography: Gao Weizhe
- Music by: Atli Örvarsson
- Production companies: The Seventh Art Pictures; Tao Piao Piao; Pearl River Film Group; Beijing Enlight Media; China Film Group Corporation; Beijing Jingxi Cultural Tourism
- Distributed by: Tao Piao Piao; China Lion Film; Trinity Cine Asia
- Release date: August 8, 2025
- Running time: 134 minutes
- Country: China
- Languages: Mandarin; English
- Budget: US$80 million
- Box office: US$50.2 million

Dongji Rescue (Chinese: 东极岛) is a 2025 Chinese historical war action film directed by Guan Hu and Fei Zhenxiang, and starring Zhu Yilong, Leo Wu and Ni Ni. Based on the real-life Lisbon Maru incident during World War II, the film tells the story of Chinese fishermen who risked their lives to save over 300 British prisoners of war after a Japanese transport ship sank off the coast of Zhoushan, east China's Zhejiang province, in 1942. The film was released in China on August 8, 2025.

== Plot ==
During World War II, on September 27, 1942, the Japanese cargo ship Lisbon Maru, carrying 1,816 British prisoners of war from Hong Kong to Japan, is torpedoed by an American submarine. The ship begins to sink slowly in the waters near Zhoushan, China. About two nautical miles from the attack site lies Dongji Island, a Chinese island then under Japanese occupation. Two pirates, Ah Bi and Ah Dang, live on the island.

One day, Ah Dang discovers an Englishman floating at sea. He rescues the man and pulls him aboard his boat, but Ah Bi stops him, believing the rescue is too dangerous. After returning to the island, Ah Dang disagrees with Ah Bi and goes back out to sea, eventually bringing the man to Dongji Island.

The man is Thomas Newman, one of the British prisoners of war thrown into the sea after the Lisbon Maru is attacked. Aware of Ah Dang's stubborn nature, Ah Bi asks Chen, a local schoolteacher, to communicate with Newman. Ah Bi then informs Mr. Wu, the father of the woman he loves, Ah Hua, about Newman's presence. Although Ah Bi repeatedly tries to drive Newman away, Ah Dang always intervenes.

Not long afterward, Japanese troops arrive on Dongji Island. Their commander, Lieutenant Commander Hideo Wada, demands that the villagers reveal the whereabouts of the British escapee. When the villagers claim they know nothing, Hideo executes a man and a young boy. Unwilling to let the villagers suffer because of him, Newman surrenders. However, the hat he wears makes Hideo suspect that the villagers have deliberately hidden him. As punishment, Hideo selects several villagers, including Wan Liang, Ah Lu, and Qian Jin, to be taken prisoner. Refusing to let them be arrested, Mr. Wu claims responsibility and insists that the rest of the villagers know nothing about Newman. Hideo immediately shoots him dead. Shortly afterward, Ah Dang volunteers to become a prisoner as well.

Once aboard the ship, Newman is beheaded, and his head is thrown into the sea. Meanwhile, the captured villagers are locked inside an overcrowded holding compartment. Admiral Hisao Wataru orders all Japanese personnel to evacuate the sinking ship on small boats while leaving the prisoners behind to drown. As water begins flooding the compartment, Ah Dang tries to swim in search of an escape route.

Back on Dongji Island, villagers attempting to bury the dead are fired upon by Japanese soldiers. The incident enrages Chen, a former soldier, who retrieves a hidden pistol and attacks the Japanese guards. Although he manages to wound one soldier, he is captured and later executed by being burned alive.

Meanwhile, Ah Bi secretly boards the Lisbon Maru and rescues Ah Dang, who is still searching for a way out. Ah Dang refuses to flee, choosing instead to break open the sealed door of a cargo hold to free the prisoners. The escape is quickly discovered, and Japanese troops open fire on the fleeing prisoners. During the chaos, Ah Dang charges at Hideo and succeeds in killing him, but he is shot and later dies after Ah Bi brings him back to Dongji Island. Enraged by Ah Dang's death, Ah Bi kills all the Japanese soldiers stationed on the island. To fulfill Ah Dang's final wish, he returns to the Lisbon Maru and frees all the surviving British prisoners.

On Dongji Island, Ah Hua demolishes a wall in her home, revealing the family ancestral altar behind it. She declares that the villagers' long-standing obedience has been meaningless, as it has only led to their deaths. Determined never to submit again, she defies the village tradition that forbids women from sailing. Her words inspire the entire community, who unite to rescue the remaining British prisoners. In the end, Ah Bi dies at sea while trying to save a boat caught in the whirlpool created by the sinking Lisbon Maru. Witnessing the villagers' rescue efforts, the Japanese forces finally withdraw.

== Cast ==
- Zhu Yilong as Ah Bi
- Leo Wu as Ah Dang
- Ni Ni as Ah Hua
- Yang Haoyu as Li Yuanxing
- Chen Minghao as Mr. Chen
- Ni Dahong as Mr. Wu
- William Franklyn-Miller as Thomas Newman
- Li Jiuxiao as Qian Jin
- Wang Yiquan as Ah Kui
- Kevin Lee as Lieutenant Colonel Stewart

== Production ==
The creative team began preparations in 2019, a process that spanned six years. In 2023, they set up filming locations in Wuxi, where the crew built a full-scale replica of a giant prisoner-of-war ship. They also used nearly lost intangible cultural heritage techniques to construct 24 fishing boats modeled after those from more than 80 years ago.

Principal photography started on 24 June 2024 and wrapped on 6 January 2025. The film was shot on locations in Zhoushan, Zhejiang.

== Release ==
Dongji Rescue was released on 8 August 2025 in China. It was released in the US and UK on 22 August 2025.

== Awards and nominations ==
Year	Award	Category	Nominee	Result	Ref.
2025	Visual Effects Society Awards	Outstanding Supporting Visual Effects in a Photoreal Feature	Tim Crosbie, Celeste Chen, Christian Sjöstedt, Lea Benjovitz	Nominated	
2025	Weibo Awards	Anticipated Movie of the Year	Dongji Rescue	Won	
