= The Political Machine (series) =

Video game series

- Genre(s): Government simulation
- Developer(s): Stardock
- Publisher(s): Ubisoft
- Creator(s): Stardock
- Platform(s): Android; iOS; Microsoft Windows
- First release: The Political Machine; August 10, 2004
- Latest release: The Political Machine 2024; May 2, 2024

The Political Machine is a government simulation game series from Stardock, in which the player leads a campaign to elect the President of the United States. The player accomplishes this goal by traveling from state to state and engaging in a variety of activities to either raise money or raise poll numbers.

== Games ==
Release timeline
2004	The Political Machine
2005
2006
2007
2008	The Political Machine 2008
2008	The Political Machine Express 2008
2009
2010
2011
2012	The Political Machine 2012
2013
2014
2015
2016	The Political Machine 2016
2017
2018
2019
2020	The Political Machine 2020
2021
2022
2023
2024	The Political Machine 2024

=== The Political Machine ===
The Political Machine is the first game in the series.

=== The Political Machine 2008 ===
The Political Machine 2008 is the second game in the series.

=== The Political Machine Express 2008 ===
The Political Machine Express 2008 is the third game in the series and was free to download upon release.

=== The Political Machine 2012 ===
The Political Machine 2012 is the fourth game in the series.

=== The Political Machine 2016 ===
The Political Machine 2016 is the fifth game in the series.

=== The Political Machine 2020 ===
The Political Machine 2020 is the sixth game in the series.

=== The Political Machine 2024 ===
The Political Machine 2024 is the seventh game in the series.

== Candidates and characters ==
23 Presidents of the United States and 72 other candidates have appeared as playable throughout the series, including George Washington, Abraham Lincoln, Bill Clinton, Hillary Clinton, Donald Trump, George Bush, Jeb Bush, John Kasich, Paul Ryan, Jim Webb, and Jill Stein. Candidates are added and removed as candidates announce themselves and as Stardock chooses.

Aside from candidates, the player can be invited onto cable news shows parodying real life equivalents. Such parodies have included takes on The Colbert Report, The O'Reilly Factor, Good Morning America, The Late Show with Stephen Colbert, Tucker Carlson Tonight, and The Ben Shapiro Show.

Candidate	2004	2008	Express 2008	2012	2016	2020	2024
George Washington	Yes	Yes	No	Yes	Yes	Yes	No
John Adams	No	No	No	No	No	Yes	No
Thomas Jefferson	Yes	Yes	No	Yes	Yes	Yes	No
James Madison	No	No	No	No	No	Yes	No
Abraham Lincoln	Yes	Yes	No	Yes	Yes	No	No
Ulysses S. Grant	Yes	Yes	No	No	Yes	No	No
Theodore Roosevelt	Yes	Yes	No	Yes	Yes	No	No
William Howard Taft	Yes	No	No	No	No	No	No
Woodrow Wilson	Yes	Yes	No	No	Yes	No	No
Franklin D. Roosevelt	Yes	No	No	No	No	No	No
Dwight D. Eisenhower	No	No	No	No	No	No	Yes
John F. Kennedy	No	Yes	No	Yes	Yes	No	No
Lyndon B. Johnson	No	Yes	No	No	Yes	No	No
Richard Nixon	Yes	Yes	No	Yes	Yes	No	Yes
Gerald Ford	Yes	No	No	No	No	No	No
Jimmy Carter	Yes	Yes	No	No	Yes	No	Yes
Ronald Reagan	Yes	Yes	No	Yes	Yes	Yes	Yes
George H. W. Bush	Yes	No	No	No	No	No	Yes
Bill Clinton	Yes	Yes	No	Yes	Yes	Yes	Yes
George W. Bush	Yes	Yes	No	No	No	Yes	Yes
Barack Obama	No	Yes	Yes	Yes	Yes	Yes	Yes
Donald Trump	No	No	No	Yes	Yes	Yes	Yes
Joe Biden	No	Yes	Yes	Yes	Yes	Yes	Yes
Ajamu Baraka	No	No	No	No	Yes	No	No
Michael Bloomberg	No	No	No	No	Yes	Yes	Yes
Doug Burgum	No	No	No	No	No	No	Yes
Barbara Bush	Yes	No	No	No	No	No	No
Jeb Bush	No	No	No	No	Yes	Yes	No
Laura Bush	Yes	No	No	No	No	No	No
Pete Buttigieg	No	No	No	No	No	Yes	Yes
Herman Cain	No	No	No	Yes	Yes	No	No
Ben Carson	No	No	No	No	Yes	No	No
Lincoln Chafee	No	No	No	No	Yes	No	No
Dick Cheney	Yes	Yes	No	No	No	No	No
Chris Christie	No	No	No	No	Yes	No	Yes
Hillary Clinton	Yes	Yes	No	Yes	Yes	Yes	Yes
Wesley Clark	Yes	No	No	No	No	No	No
Dan Crenshaw	No	No	No	No	No	Yes	Yes
Ted Cruz	No	No	No	No	Yes	Yes	Yes
Catherine Cortez	No	No	No	No	No	Yes	No
Ron DeSantis	No	No	No	No	No	No	Yes
John Edwards	Yes	Yes	No	No	No	No	No
Carly Fiorina	No	No	No	No	Yes	No	No
Al Franken	No	No	No	Yes	Yes	No	No
Tulsi Gabbard	No	No	No	No	No	Yes	No
Dick Gephardt	Yes	No	No	No	No	No	No
Newt Gingrich	No	No	No	Yes	Yes	No	No
Rudy Giuliani	No	Yes	No	No	No	No	No
Barry Goldwater	No	No	No	No	No	Yes	No
Al Gore	Yes	Yes	No	Yes	Yes	Yes	Yes
Mike Gravel	No	Yes	No	No	No	No	No
Alexander Hamilton	No	No	No	No	No	Yes	No
Nikki Haley	No	No	No	No	Yes	No	Yes
Kamala Harris	No	No	No	No	No	Yes	Yes
Mike Huckabee	No	Yes	No	No	Yes	No	No
Jon Huntsman	No	No	No	Yes	Yes	No	No
Gary Johnson	No	No	No	No	Yes	No	No
Tim Kaine	No	No	No	No	Yes	No	No
Robert Kennedy Jr.	No	No	No	No	No	No	Yes
John Kerry	Yes	Yes	No	Yes	Yes	No	Yes
Amy Klobuchar	No	No	No	No	No	Yes	No
Dennis Kucinich	No	Yes	No	Yes	Yes	No	No
John McCain	No	Yes	Yes	No	No	Yes	No
Mitch McConnell	No	No	No	No	No	Yes	No
Ralph Nader	No	No	No	No	No	No	Yes
Michelle Obama	No	No	No	Yes	Yes	No	No
Alexandria Ocasio-Cortez	No	No	No	No	No	Yes	No
Martin O'Malley	No	No	No	No	Yes	No	Yes
Sarah Palin	No	Yes	Yes	Yes	Yes	Yes	No
Rand Paul	No	No	No	No	Yes	Yes	No
Ron Paul	No	Yes	No	Yes	Yes	No	No
Nancy Pelosi	No	No	No	Yes	Yes	No	No
Mike Pence	No	No	No	No	Yes	Yes	Yes
Ross Perot	No	No	No	No	No	No	Yes
Rick Perry	No	No	No	Yes	Yes	No	No
Dean Phillips	No	No	No	No	No	No	Yes
Vivek Ramaswamy	No	No	No	No	No	No	Yes
Condoleezza Rice	Yes	Yes	No	Yes	Yes	No	No
Bill Richardson	Yes	Yes	No	No	No	No	No
Mitt Romney	No	Yes	No	Yes	Yes	Yes	Yes
Marco Rubio	No	No	No	Yes	Yes	No	No
Paul Ryan	No	No	No	Yes	Yes	No	No
Bernie Sanders	No	No	No	No	Yes	Yes	Yes
Rick Santorum	No	No	No	Yes	Yes	No	No
Arnold Schwarzenegger	Yes	No	No	No	No	No	No
Tim Scott	No	No	No	No	No	No	Yes
Jill Stein	No	No	No	No	Yes	No	Yes
J.D. Vance	No	No	No	No	No	No	Yes
Tom Vilsack	Yes	No	No	No	No	No	No
Tim Walz	No	No	No	No	No	No	Yes
Elizabeth Warren	No	No	No	No	Yes	Yes	Yes
Jim Webb	No	No	No	No	Yes	No	No
Bill Weld	No	No	No	No	Yes	No	No
Marianne Williamson	No	No	No	No	No	No	Yes
Andrew Yang	No	No	No	No	No	Yes	Yes

== Reception ==
Aggregate review scores As of November 13, 2023.
Game	Metacritic
The Political Machine	72
The Political Machine 2008	73
The Political Machine 2012	54
The Political Machine 2016	72
The Political Machine 2020	TBA
The Political Machine 2024	TBA
