= Time Flies (book) =

Memoirs of Al Clark

- Author: Al Clark
- Cover artist: Photo by Pennie Smith (1979)
- Language: English
- Genre: Memoir
- Publisher: Brandl & Schlesinger
- Publication date: May 1st, 2021
- Publication place: Australia
- Media type: Paperback, E-Pub
- Pages: 223 (paperback)
- ISBN: 978-0648523376
- Followed by: Time Flies Too

Time Flies Too
- Author: Al Clark
- Cover artist: Andras Berkes-Brandl
- Language: English
- Genre: Memoir
- Publisher: Brandl & Schlesinger
- Publication date: October 1st, 2022
- Publication place: Australia
- Media type: Paperback, E-Pub
- Pages: 271
- ISBN: 978-0-6454998-0-3
- Preceded by: Time Flies

Time Flies is a 2021 book by Australian film producer Al Clark. It was published on May 1, 2021, by Brandl & Schlesinger. Its sequel Time Flies Too was published on October 1, 2022.

== Background ==
On writing Time Flies Clark felt that it was time to immerse himself in reflecting on his unusual life, and the environment, and countries in which it has unfolded.

Clark always planned to write two halves to the memoirs, considering that he could labour for several years over a 500-page version or write two 250-page accounts. The two books are separated geographically and emotionally, with the second book beginning when he moved to Australia.

== Reception ==
Richard Branson included Time Flies as his Literati Book Club in March 2022 and filmed interview where they reminisced about his time at Virgin.

Peter Galvin at Film Ink said Time Flies is a "sometimes-hard-to-believe-but-no-it's-all-true adventure" that was witty and fast moving. Of Time Flies Too, Film Ink reviewed the second book as funnier, more candid, and self-deprecating, and said that it was clear that Clark has a deep love of all things cinema.

Australian director Bruce Beresford said Time Flies covered "An extraordinary life, observed with humour and fascinating tales of celebrities in the music and movie worlds."
