= S.W.A.T. (2019 film) =

2019 Chinese action film

- Poster
- Simplified Chinese: 特警队
- Hanyu Pinyin: Te jing dui
- Directed by: Ding Sheng
- Written by: Xu Yang; Ding Sheng; Alex Jia
- Produced by: Lan Ruihai; Wang Lei; Chen Yushan
- Starring: Ling Xiaosu; Jia Nailiang; Kevin Lee; Zhang Yunlong; Liu Junxiao
- Cinematography: Ding Yu
- Music by: Xiao Ke
- Production company: Beijing Culture
- Distributed by: Beijing Culture
- Release date: 27 December 2019 (China)
- Running time: 109 minutes
- Country: China
- Language: Mandarin

S.W.A.T. (Chinese: 特警队) is a 2019 Mandarin-language Chinese action film directed by Ding Sheng.

== Plot ==
Some people are using a new drug which is causing users to hallucinate and resort to violence. Team One and Team Two of the Blue Sword Commando Unit, who have a competitive rivalry between themselves, must work together with their new female team members as well as with each other to disrupt the downstream dealers in order to bring the upstream supplier Hong Bing out of hiding and capture him when he is exposed. They learn that a large amount of the drug is being produced by Hong Bing's gang on an island off the east coast and launch an operation to take down the operation. They destroy the drug factory, rescue the hostage Fu and capture Hong Bing.

== Cast ==
- Ling Xiaosu as Liu Lang
- Jia Nailiang as Liao Xingliang
- Kevin Lee as Ted
- Zhang Yunlong as Zhao Hailong
- Liu Junxiao as Yao Zhong
- Cai Xin as Zhang Jun
- Wang Bowen as Liu Meng
- Chang Rong as Zhan Rong
- Zhao Xiaorui as Zhang Haiqiang
- Nashi as Na Mei
- Ding Yi as Dong Hui
- Chunyu Shanshan as Hong Bing
- Robert Knepper as Sam
- Sang Ping as A Fu
- Marc Ma
- Qiao Zhenyu as Guo Zhigang
- Zhang Liang as Luo Gang
- Jin Chen as Guo Qiaonan
- Bassem Khayati
- Brono Bajtala as Mercenary
- J. Cheung
- Matthew Del Bel Belluz as Mercenary
- Paul W. He as Detective Yang
- Mykyta Rozenko as Mercenary

== Production ==
Film shooting completed in 2018, then the film's post-production lasted into 2019.

The film is reportedly based on true stories of Beijing's Blue Sword S.W.A.T. team. Director Ding Sheng stated that "major cast members were allowed to train with Chinese SWAT police officers with the support of Beijing Municipal Public Security Bureau and Ministry of Public Security."

== Reception ==
In an article titled "Beijing Culture's Song Ge Urges Mainstream Directors to Toe Government Line", Variety noted that S.W.A.T. was among the films being backed by the studio Beijing Culture, whose chairman Song Ge "openly urged film directors [...] to stick to material pleasing to the Chinese state, for the sake of their investors." Song stated, "If you're shooting an art house or smaller budget films, it's no problem — say what you want to say and shoot what you want to shoot. But once you're shooting with investors' money, given the societal circumstances we have today, you should shoot films that reflect mainstream values." He defined those values as "things that the state allows you to shoot – things that the average people are used to seeing, that stabilize society," adding that "this is the place of commercial films."

Reviewer LP Hugo of Asian Film Strike gave the film a rating of two stars, writing, "Subtlety is absent, and the usual racial paradigm of these Chinese propaganda actioners applies more than ever: Chinese are good, Africans are funny, Caucasians are evil." The review concludes, "A thinly-plotted, glorified recruiting video for the Chinese elite forces, S.W.A.T. has fleeting moments of solid entertainment, but never chooses between realism and ridiculousness, and is populated with bland unknowns acting out tired macho posturing."

Reviewer Derek Elley of Sino-Cinema gave the film a rating of 4 out of 10, writing, "With its computerised script and dialogue, and absence of quirky touches and humour, it's all a long way from Ding’s offbeat action movies". The review continues, "Co-produced by Beijing Municipal Public Security Bureau, the movie is bookended by encomia to the SWAT forces, including footage of real-life operations at the end. Inbetween it's pretty much gung-ho all the way, with plenty of chest-beating in the male showers, endless clench-jawed training sessions, and generally unmemorable action [...]. It may all be technically authentic but dramatically there’s very little going on beneath the surface to sustain an almost two-hour movie. Individually the cast of Gen-80 actors [...] hardly register and, once they're in combat gear, are difficult to tell apart anyway. In a very filmy touch, two female commandos are shoehorned into the story to make laboured points about equality and diversity, with former dancer/rhythmic gymnast Jin Chen 金晨 [...] playing a character who keeps saying 'I'm as good as a man!' but not getting much chance to prove it."

Xu Wei of shine.cn wrote, "Based on the true stories of a SWAT team in Beijing, the film is centered on police endeavors to keep the city safe. It's also a tribute to police across the country."
