= Red Hill (film) =

2010 film

- Theatrical release poster
- Directed by: Patrick Hughes
- Written by: Patrick Hughes
- Produced by: Al Clark; Patrick Hughes
- Starring: Ryan Kwanten; Steve Bisley; Tom E. Lewis; Claire van der Boom
- Cinematography: Tim Hudson
- Edited by: Patrick Hughes
- Music by: Dmitri Golovko
- Distributed by: Sony Pictures Releasing International
- Release dates: 14 February 2010 (Berlinale); 2 December 2010 (Australia)
- Running time: 95 minutes
- Country: Australia
- Language: English
- Box office: $20,860

Red Hill is a 2010 Australian neo-western thriller film written and directed by Patrick Hughes in his directorial debut. The film stars Ryan Kwanten, Steve Bisley, and Tom E. Lewis.

== Plot ==
Shane Cooper, a young police officer, relocates to the small town of Red Hill with his pregnant wife Alice. On his first day on the job, he is shown hostility from William "Old Bill" Jones, the head of the police force, for being unable to find his gun and getting shot on duty when he could not bring himself to fire his weapon on an armed boy.

Shortly afterwards, the police learn that Jimmy Conway, a convicted murderer who was arrested by Old Bill for killing his wife, has escaped from prison. Knowing that Jimmy will return to town to seek revenge, Old Bill orders his officers and a group of civilians to arm themselves and shoot Jimmy on sight.

Old Bill's men prove to be no match for Jimmy, who remorselessly kills officers and armed civilians. The convict encounters Shane but lets him live. When Shane finds Old Bill, he confronts Bill over the fact that Jimmy spared his life and learns that Bill has refused to call for backup from a nearby town. Shane draws his gun on Bill, but again finds himself unable to fire it and is subsequently knocked out and handcuffed to a table.

Shane escapes and uses a satellite phone at Gleason's farm to contact the nearby police for backup. During the call Shane discovers Gleason on the verge of hanging himself; when Shane talks to him, the farmer reveals that Jimmy Conway is innocent of the murder of his wife. The murder was the work of Old Bill and his men, who set fire to Jimmy's house after raping and killing his wife, revenge for Jimmy's interference in a proposed railroad extension that would have gone through Red Hill. Gleason informs Shane that he has a written document of what really happened, before committing suicide. Now knowing the real reason why Jimmy returned to Red Hill, Shane returns home to get his gun, which Alice found while he was on duty.

Near the outskirts of town, Old Bill sets stacks of hay on fire to attract Jimmy's attention. Jimmy arrives and kills Bill's last remaining deputies, but is stopped from finishing Bill off when two of Bill's friends arrive and hold him at gunpoint. Shane also arrives and saves Jimmy by shooting Bill's friends after informing Bill that he knows the truth.

The police backup arrives and confront Jimmy as he prepares to get his revenge on Old Bill. Despite Shane's efforts to get him to drop his gun, Jimmy kills Old Bill and is promptly shot by the police. Before dying, the seemingly mute Jimmy tells Shane that his wife was pregnant with his son.

== Cast ==
- Ryan Kwanten as Shane Cooper
- Steve Bisley as William "Old Bill" Jones
- Tom E. Lewis as Dural "Jimmy" Conway
- Claire van der Boom as Alice Cooper
- Christopher Davis as Slim
- Kevin Harrington as Jim Barlow
- Richard Sutherland as Manning
- Ken Radley as Earl
- John Brumpton as Rex
- Cliff Ellen as Gleason
- Jim Daly as Ted
- Dom Phelan as Ken
- Eddie Baroo as Willy
- Tim Hughes as Micky Carlin
- Ken Connley as Joseph Carlin
- Richard E. Young as Dale
- Jada Alberts as Ellin Conway
- Elspeth Ballantyne as Old Woman

== Production ==
Finance for principal photography was raised privately. The neo-western thriller film was shot over a period of four weeks in Omeo, Victoria. After the film was shot, an edit was put together and the film was shopped around to find a distributor and funds to finish the film. The film received completion funds from Screen Australia and Arclight Films.

== Release ==
Red Hill premiered at the 60th Berlin International Film Festival on 14 February 2010 in the Panorama section. It was released in the United States on 5 November 2010 and in Australia on 25 November.

== Reception ==
The film generally received positive reviews. It holds a 79% approval rating on Rotten Tomatoes, based on 67 reviews, with an average score of 6.48/10. The site's consensus reads: "Though its attempts to rework genre conventions may fall flat with some, Red Hill is a beautifully shot, tightly paced thriller that marks a strong debut for director Patrick Hughes". David Stratton of At the Movies gave the film four out of five stars and said "The plot isn't exactly original … but after a deliberately slow start the film gradually builds the suspense and eventually explodes into very well-staged action." Jeanette Catsoulis of The New York Times gave the film a positive review, saying "Red Hill wears its clichés proudly and its violence with panache. Patrick Hughes directs and edits his own story with fanatical focus, while Tim Hudson's photography coaxes foreboding from every rust-brown shadow and desiccated blade of grass." Sandra Hall of The Sydney Morning Herald gave the film three out of five stars, saying "Rodriguez has made stuff like this work by demonstrating a healthy sense of self-parody. Hughes has yet to master that. You can also see his climactic plot twist looming from a great distance and these shortcomings add up to a portentousness jarringly at odds with the film's modest intentions."

=== Accolades ===
Award	Category	Subject	Result
AACTA Award (1st)	Best Original Screenplay	Patrick Hughes	Nominated
FCCA Awards	Best Editor	Patrick Hughes	Nominated
FCCA Awards	Best Male Actor	Ryan Kwanten	Nominated
Inside Film Award	Best Cinematography	Tim Hudson	Nominated
Australian Screen Music Award	Best Soundtrack Album	Dmitri Golovko	Nominated

== See also ==
- Cinema of Australia
