= Hitman's Wife's Bodyguard =

2021 film by Patrick Hughes

- Theatrical release poster
- Directed by: Patrick Hughes
- Screenplay by: Tom O'Connor; Brandon Murphy; Phillip Murphy
- Story by: Tom O'Connor
- Based on: Characters by Tom O'Connor
- Produced by: Matt O'Toole; Les Weldon; Yariv Lerner
- Starring: Ryan Reynolds; Samuel L. Jackson; Salma Hayek; Antonio Banderas; Morgan Freeman
- Cinematography: Terry Stacey
- Edited by: Michael J. Duthie; Jack Hutchings
- Music by: Atli Örvarsson
- Production companies: Summit Entertainment; Millennium Media; Nu Boyana Film Studios; Campbell Grobman Films; Film i Väst; Filmgate Films
- Distributed by: Lionsgate
- Release date: June 16, 2021
- Running time: 100 minutes (U.S.); 116 minutes (Australasia)
- Country: United States
- Language: English
- Budget: $70 million
- Box office: $70.1 million

Hitman's Wife's Bodyguard is a 2021 American action comedy film directed by Patrick Hughes and written by Tom O'Connor and Brandon and Phillip Murphy. The film is a sequel to the 2017 film The Hitman's Bodyguard and features Ryan Reynolds, Samuel L. Jackson, Salma Hayek, and Richard E. Grant reprising their roles, with Frank Grillo, Antonio Banderas, and Morgan Freeman joining the cast.

In the film, suspended bodyguard Michael Bryce (Reynolds) must once again team up with hitman Darius Kincaid (Jackson) and his wife, Sonia (Hayek), to stop a madman (Banderas) from launching a terror attack on Europe.

Hitman's Wife's Bodyguard was theatrically released in the United States on June 16, 2021, by Lionsgate. The film received negative reviews from critics and flopped at the box office, grossing $70.1 million on a $70 million budget, less than half its predecessor.

== Plot ==
Michael Bryce, haunted by the loss of his client Takashi Kurosawa by Darius Kincaid, is temporarily retired from being a bodyguard and is on a sabbatical vacation while waiting for reinstatement of his license. He takes a vacation in Capri until Sonia Kincaid tracks him and forces him to fight against mobsters who come to kill her before they escape. She asks him to help her rescue her husband, Darius, after the mobsters kidnap him. Sonia reveals that she and Darius tried to start a family after getting married, but they're unable to have a child.

Meanwhile, Interpol agent Bobby O'Neil is investigating the sudden power surge that caused a major blackout and infrastructure damage in Zagreb by Greek billionaire ultranationalist mastermind Aristotle Papadopoulos, who plans to launch a cyberattack to destroy the European power grid in retaliation for the E.U.'s sanctions on Greece.

Darius is captured by Carlo, a mobster trafficker in Terracina. Before Carlo can have Darius butchered, Bryce and Sonia rescue Darius before he kills Carlo. Bryce and the Kincaids are caught by O'Neil, who reveals the mobster Carlo they killed was his informant and was about to buy a hard drive that would give him coordinates to a cyberattack by Aristotle. He threatens to imprison them unless they infiltrate a party in Portofino and buy the coordinates to a data grid.

The trio manages to infiltrate the party and make the purchase while being informed that they are to meet the buyer at Florence, but Sonia is handcuffed with an explosive device if she loses the coordinates in a case. Bryce is recognized by a former client, compromising their position, resulting in a shootout; however, they manage to escape before Interpol agents storm in. O'Neil's boss, Crowley, discovers O'Neil's involvement in hiring the trio and puts a red notice on them. Meanwhile, Aristotle discovers that Sonia is involved with the heist.

In Florence, the trio learns that Aristotle is the buyer before being discovered, and a car chase ensures they escape their pursuers. Fed up with their antics, Bryce abandons the Kincaids but changes his mind and offers them to head for Tuscany to meet his bodyguard stepfather, Bryce Senior. Senior offers to help the trio and remove Sonia's detonation bracelet, but they get captured by Aristotle's henchmen. Aristotle reveals that he was Sonia's former lover before she met Darius. He seduces her to turn against Darius, removes the bracelet, and acquires the coordinates for the power grids. Darius and Bryce flee, and Sonia refuses to go after she finds out the reason Darius was kidnapped is that he was going to buy egg cells at a fertility clinic due to his being unable to get her pregnant after a botched mission in Brussels resulted in him getting shot in the testicles. Darius leaves to get Sonia back, while Bryce returns to Senior, who reveals himself to be Aristotle's head of security before he disowns Bryce and tells him that he got the bodyguard agency to blacklist Bryce.

Bryce and Darius compose themselves before Sonia calls them, who reveals that she is manipulating Aristotle and he's sending a hitman squad to kill them. Meanwhile, Aristotle learns of her deception and attempts to drown her. After killing Aristotle's henchmen, Darius and Bryce are arrested by Interpol, but they learn that Aristotle will drill into the underwater data junction at Viareggio Trench in the ocean, so they release them to stop Aristotle. Bryce and Darius disrupt his plan to drill into a data junction underwater and fight Aristotle and Senior. Bryce kills Senior, while Darius and Sonia kill Aristotle. Bryce manages to hit the manual override to destroy the ship and stop the drill, and the three survive the explosion.

O'Neill tells them to stay on a yacht together for 48 hours before being cleared. He then hands Bryce papers to sign, which he thinks are his bodyguard license. He signs them only to find out they are adoption papers for him to become the son of Sonia and Darius, much to both Bryce and Darius' horror.

In a mid-credits scene, O'Neill informs Bryce that the three had to stay for at least another month before being cleared. A dejected Bryce jumps off the yacht as Sonia and Darius make love.

== Cast ==
- Ryan Reynolds as Michael Bryce, Michael Sr.’s stepson and a bodyguard-for-hire on mandatory sabbatical which leaves him without the authority to use lethal weaponry.
  - Ivor Bagarić as young Michael Bryce
- Samuel L. Jackson as Darius Kincaid, a world-renowned hitman.
- Salma Hayek as Sonia Kincaid, Darius' wife.
- Frank Grillo as Bobby O'Neil, an Interpol agent.
- Antonio Banderas as Aristotle Papadopoulos, a Greek shipping tycoon plotting a cyber attack across Europe.
- Morgan Freeman as Michael Bryce Sr., Michael's stepfather and Aristotle's head of security.
- Richard E. Grant as Mr. Seifert, an old associate of Bryce and a drug addict.
- Tom Hopper as Magnusson, a famous bodyguard employed by Aristotle.
- Kristofer Kamiyasu as Zento, a famous Japanese hitman employed by Aristotle.
- Caroline Goodall as Superintendent Crowley, a senior Interpol agent.
- Alice McMillan as Ailso, Crowley's Scottish Interpol translator and O'Neill's assistant.
- Gabriella Wright as Veronika
- Dragan Mićanović as Vlad
- Rebecca Front as Joanne, Michael's therapist
- Blake Ritson as Gunther
- Miltos Yerolemou as Carlo

Gary Oldman is briefly seen as Vladislav Dukhovich through archive footage from the first film. Additionally, director Patrick Hughes appears as a bouncer at the club.

== Production ==
=== Development and casting ===
In May 2018, it was announced that Ryan Reynolds, Samuel L. Jackson, and Salma Hayek were in early talks to reprise their roles for a sequel to the 2017 film The Hitman's Bodyguard, with plans to begin filming later in the year. While Lionsgate was in talks to secure the United States distribution rights, Patrick Hughes was also in talks to return for directing duties. In November 2018, Lionsgate acquired the US rights from Millennium Films, while Matt O'Toole and Les Weldon would produce the film through Millennium and Campbell Grobman Films, and Hughes would return to direct the film from the script by Tom O'Connor, Brandon Murphy and Phillip Murphy. Reynolds, Jackson, and Hayek also officially signed on to star in the sequel. In March 2019, Frank Grillo, Morgan Freeman, Antonio Banderas and Tom Hopper joined the cast of the film, with Richard E. Grant reprising his role from the first.

=== Filming ===
Principal photography began in Europe on March 2, 2019. Filming took place in Italy (Trieste), Croatia (Rovinj, Rijeka, Karlovac, Zagreb, Jastrebarsko, Pisarovina, Motovun, Buje, Vodnjan, Lim Channel and Biševo), Slovenia, Bulgaria and United Kingdom.

== Release ==
Lionsgate Films released the film on June 16, 2021, after being previously delayed to August 20, 2021, from an original release date of August 28, 2020 due to the COVID-19 pandemic.

== Reception ==
=== Box office ===
Hitman's Wife's Bodyguard grossed $38 million in the United States and Canada, and $32 million in other territories, for a worldwide total of $70.1 million.

In the United States and Canada, the film was projected to gross around $15 million from 3,331 theaters over its five-day opening weekend. The film made $3.9 million on its first day of release, including $1.8 million from advanced screenings the weekend before and $815,000 from Tuesday night previews. It went on to gross $11.4 million in its opening weekend and $16.7 million over the five days, topping the box office. It fell 57% to $4.9 million in its second weekend, finishing in third, then $3 million in its third weekend, including $3.9 million over the four-day 4th of July frame.

=== Critical response ===
On review aggregator Rotten Tomatoes, the film holds an approval rating of 26% based on 193 reviews, with an average rating of 4.3/10. The site's critics consensus reads: "Despite the charms of its ensemble, The Hitman's Wife's Bodyguard fails to protect the audience from repetitive and tired genre tropes." On Metacritic, the film has weighted average score of 32 out of 100 based on reviews from 36 critics, indicating "generally unfavorable" reviews. Audiences polled by CinemaScore gave the film an average grade of "B" on an A+ to F scale, while PostTrak reported 75% of audience members gave it a positive score, with 53% saying they would definitely recommend it.

Alonso Duralde of the TheWrap wrote: "Hitman's Wife Bodyguard is a comedy with not one legitimate laugh and an action movie where cars keep blowing up while the A-listers yell at each other, as though that were inherently amusing or entertaining." From The Hollywood Reporter, David Rooney said: "Screenwriters Tom O'Connor, Phillip Murphy, and Brandon Murphy display no interest in how credible characters—even cartoonishly exaggerated comic ones—might really behave under circumstances like these, which wouldn't be so bad if the movie were funnier. But its occasional laughs drown in a sea of action-comedy tropes that have been stale for decades."

== Possible sequel ==
In June 2021, Patrick Hughes stated that a third film is in development with the basic plot including an additional main cast member, already mapped out. By July, the filmmaker acknowledged that the end of the film leaves opportunity open for additional installments. Hughes stated: "The ending of this film lends itself to more suffering for Michael Bryce, so that can continue for eternity because I certainly love watching Ryan suffer. If there's potential to do it further, then we certainly are going to pursue that."
