= Mia Rodgers =

British actress

- Born: Mia Cailin Rodgers; 17 May 2000 (age 26); London, England
- Education: Royal Central School of Speech and Drama
- Occupation: Actress
- Years active: 2018–present
- Known for: The Sex Lives of College Girls

Mia Cailin Rodgers (born 17 May 2000) is an English actress.

== Early life ==
Rodgers was born and raised in the North London Borough of Islington. Her parents both worked in the fashion industry. Prior to acting, Rodgers initially intended to go into singing. She studied at the Royal Central School of Speech and Drama. During her time there, she starred in the play Pool (No Water).

== Career ==
After graduating from drama school, Rodgers starred in two episodes of the ITV miniseries Trauma, guest starred in an episode of the BBC Two legal comedy Defending the Guilty, and appeared in the short film Diary of a Ghost. She then landed the role of series regular Taylor in the third season of The Sex Lives of College Girls on HBO Max.

== Filmography ==
Year	Title	Role	Notes
2018	Trauma	Jasmine Marks	2 episodes
2019	Defending the Guilty	Kirsten	Episode 3
2024–2025	The Sex Lives of College Girls	Taylor	Main role
2026	Father Brown	Eva Richards	Episode: "The Power of Suggestion"
2026	Young Washington	Sally Fairfax	
