= Sniper (2022 film) =

- Theatrical film poster
- Traditional Chinese: 狙擊手
- Simplified Chinese: 狙击手
- Hanyu Pinyin: Jūjīshǒu
- Directed by: Zhang Yimou; Zhang Mo
- Written by: Chen Yu
- Produced by: Pang Liwei; Cao Xiaobei
- Starring: Zhang Yu; Chen Yongsheng; Zhang Yi
- Cinematography: Zhao Xiaoding
- Edited by: Li Yongyi
- Music by: Dong Dongdong; Xi Chen
- Distributed by: Beijing Enlight Media
- Release date: 1 February 2022 (China)
- Running time: 96 minutes
- Country: China
- Language: Mandarin
- Box office: $95 million

Sniper or Snipers (Chinese: 狙击手) is a 2022 Chinese war film directed by Zhang Yimou and his daughter Zhang Mo and starring Zhang Yu, Chen Yongsheng, and Zhang Yi. The film is based on a fictionalized account of the real life story of Zhang Taofang, a Chinese sniper fighting American soldiers in the Korean War. The film premiered in China on 1 February 2022, to commemorate PLA Day.

== Plot ==
The story follows members of 5th Squad, 8th Company of the People's Volunteer Army as they fight American soldiers in the Korean War.

== Cast ==
- Zhang Yu as Liu Wenwu, squad leader of 5th Squad
- Chen Yongsheng as Zhang Dayong
- Zhang Yi as Company Commander (special appearance)
- Liu Yitie
- Lin Boyang
- Kenan Heppe
- Kevin Lee
- Wang Ziyi
- Chen Mingyang
- Wang Naixun
- Cheng Hongxin
- Liu Haocun
- AJ Donnelly

== Production ==
Shooting began in Paektu Mountain of Jilin on 6 January 2021.

== Music ==
No.	Title	Lyrics	Music	Singer(s)	Length
1.	"No Man's Land (无人之境)" (Theme)	Cui Shu	Terence Lam	Roy Wang; Zhuang Yinan

== Release ==
Sniper was slated for release on July 30, 2021 in China, but was moved to February 1, 2022. It was funded by the China Film Administration.
