= Young Washington =

2026 film by Jon Erwin

- Theatrical release poster
- Directed by: Jon Erwin
- Written by: Jon Erwin; Tom Provost; Diederik Hoogstraten
- Produced by: Jon Erwin; Chip Diggins; Benton Crane; Tyler Zacharia
- Starring: William Franklyn-Miller; Mary-Louise Parker; Kelsey Grammer; Andy Serkis; Ben Kingsley
- Cinematography: Kristopher Kimlin
- Edited by: Parker Adams; David de Vos
- Music by: Kevin Kiner; Sean Kiner; Deana Kiner
- Production companies: Wonder Project; 2521 Entertainment; 10 Ton Productions; Red 56
- Distributed by: Angel Studios
- Release dates: June 13, 2026 (Tribeca Festival); July 3, 2026 (United States)
- Running time: 120 minutes
- Country: United States
- Language: English
- Budget: $20 million
- Box office: $47.1 million

Young Washington is a 2026 American historical war drama film directed, produced, and co-written by Jon Erwin. It is based on the early life of the Founding Father and first president of the United States, George Washington, and focuses on his experiences and command in the French and Indian War between 1753 and 1755. William Franklyn-Miller stars as Washington, with Mary-Louise Parker, Kelsey Grammer, Andy Serkis and Ben Kingsley in supporting roles.

The film premiered at the Tribeca Festival on June 13, 2026, and was released in the United States by Angel Studios on July 3, 2026. It received mixed reviews from critics and has grossed $47 million against a production budget of $20 million. A sequel is in development.

== Plot ==
In 1743, after the death of his father Augustine Washington, George Washington meets his older half-brother Lawrence. Because of his father's death, Washington is not given a formal education. Lawrence tutors his half-brother in land surveying. In 1753 Williamsburg, Virginia, George is denied commission into the British Army due to his colonial background. Thanks to Lawrence's recommendation, lieutenant governor Robert Dinwiddie signs George into the Virginia Militia, where he is assigned to travel to the Ohio Country to deliver a message to the French demanding they leave. Before he departs, George arrives uninvited at Thomas Fairfax's plantation Belvoir. There, Washington meets Sally Cary, Thomas Gage, and surveyor Christopher Gist.

Along the Ohio Country, Washington and Gist meet Mingo warriors led by Haudenosaunee leader "Half-King" Tanacharison. Gist saves Washington's life when he pulls him from the freezing Allegheny River after they have fallen off a makeshift raft. They deliver the message to Joseph Jumonville, who refuses to leave. Since the French have refused to leave, Dinwiddie promotes Washington as major to lead the Virginia Regiment, where they are joined by Tanacharison's warriors. Tanacharison seeks vengeance against the French for his father's murder. Despite George's warnings, Tanacharison and his warriors attack the French, and during the battle, Jumonville is killed.

Back in Williamsburg, Dinwiddie condemns Washington for escalating a war with the French. Meanwhile, Washington learns Sally has been engaged to his rival George William Fairfax. At Fort Necessity, Washington is given the rank of colonel, following Joshua Fry's death, and joins British soldiers under the command of James Mackay. On July 3, 1754, French forces led by Louis Coulon de Villiers (brother of Joseph Jumonville) force the garrison to retreat, and during the assault on the fort, Gist is killed. As the French have won a decisive victory, Washington is forced to surrender and unwittingly signs a document admitting responsibility for assassinating Joseph Jumonville. The French set fire to Fort Necessity.

Demoralized, and after Lawrence's death from tuberculosis, Washington resigns from the Virginia Regiment. His mother, Mary Ball Washington renews her son's belief that he is protected by Providence and to learn from his failure. In 1755, George decides to re-enlist into the regiment, led by British General Edward Braddock. Serving as an aide-de-camp, George joins the Braddock Expedition to retake Fort Duquesne, though he falls ill with dysentery.

On July 9, 1755, Braddock's forces are ambushed by French and Canadian troops under Captain Daniel Liénard de Beaujeu. During the battle, George wakes up and joins the British forces; thinking that Braddock has called for a retreat, he goes to help his men of Virginia. Washington finds Braddock, who has been shot and is dying, and is told that he did not call for a retreat and that he must rally the remaining men. Washington finds the men of Virginia and rallies the army to form a rear guard, allowing the British to retreat safely. On the battlefield, George sustains four bullet holes in his coat, one bullet hole in his hat, and two horses shot down from beneath him. Although the British have lost the battle, George's courage under fire contributes to his reputation that he was protected by Providence. In August 1755, Dinwiddie, impressed by his valor, appoints George as colonel and commander of the Virginia Regiment.

== Cast ==
- William Franklyn-Miller as George Washington
- Ben Kingsley as Robert Dinwiddie
- Andy Serkis as Edward Braddock
- Joel Smallbone as George William Fairfax
- Kelsey Grammer as Thomas Fairfax
- Mary-Louise Parker as Mary Ball Washington
- Mia Rodgers as Sally Fairfax
- Jonno Davies as James Mackay
- John Foss as Lawrence Washington
- Michael Benz as Thomas Gage
- Leo Hanna as Christopher Gist
- Clement Toyon as Joseph Jumonville

== Production ==
In July 2025, Angel Studios announced that a biographical drama film revolving around the life of George Washington, the first president of the United States, was in development, with Jon Erwin directing the film, and co-writing the script with Tom Provost and Diederik Hoogstraten. William Franklyn-Miller was cast in the lead role. In August, Ben Kingsley, Andy Serkis and Joel Smallbone joined the cast. Principal photography began in late August 2025, in Ireland, with Kelsey Grammer joining the cast as Thomas Fairfax. Mary-Louise Parker, Mia Rodgers and Jonno Davies were added to the cast in the following month.

Director Jon Erwin openly admitted that video generated by artificial intelligence was used in the final film. 100 shots in the film were augmented using AI, using it to expand practical sets, make physical props such as cannons fire, and ensure period-appropriate clothing and backgrounds. According to Erwin, in a scene where Washington and his crew are crossing an icy river, “The actors were there, the raft was there, the water was there, but the water wasn’t cold.” However, this approach drew backlash on social media.

== Release ==
Young Washington premiered at the Tribeca Festival on June 13, 2026, and was released in the United States by Angel Studios on July 3, 2026.

== Reception ==
=== Box office ===
In the United States and Canada, Young Washington was projected to gross around $15 million from 2,700 theaters in its opening weekend. The film made $7.6 million on its first day and went on to debut to $19.4 million, exceeding projections and finishing third behind Minions & Monsters and Toy Story 5.

=== Critical response ===
On the review aggregator website Rotten Tomatoes, 59% of 59 critics' reviews are positive, with an average rating of 6.1/10. The website's consensus reads: "Though its muted storytelling keeps it from being the rousing epic it aspires to be, Young Washington delivers its portrait of America's first president with earnest conviction, historical reverence, and rousing battle sequences." Metacritic, which uses a weighted average, assigned the film a score of 49 out of 100, based on 13 critics, indicating "mixed or average" reviews. Audiences polled by CinemaScore gave the film an average grade of "A" on an A+ to F scale, while 81% of those surveyed by PostTrak said they would definitely recommend the film.

Mick LaSalle of the San Francisco Chronicle praises the film's battle scenes but writes that Mia Rodgers's performance in it of Sally Fairfax "seems as about as 18th century as an iPhone." Owen Gleiberman described Young Washington in a Variety review as "watchable in a stolid way, as if it were a 'Masterpiece Theatre' movie made by the Ted Turner Pictures of 20 years ago"; he deems it as "just competent enough to create that crisp tug of schoolkid patriotism the books we read as children provided." Eileen Jones of Jacobin described the film as an "earnest but dull and often ludicrous account of Washington's ambitious early manhood".

== Sequel ==
Following the film's successful opening weekend, Erwin announced he was working on a follow-up to the film that is to be titled 1776, chronicling Washington's experience during the American Revolution.

== See also ==
- Cultural depictions of George Washington
