= War Machine (2026 film) =

2026 Australian American film

- Release poster
- Directed by: Patrick Hughes
- Screenplay by: Patrick Hughes; James Beaufort
- Story by: Patrick Hughes
- Produced by: Todd Lieberman; Greg McLean; Alex Young; Rich Cook; Patrick Hughes
- Starring: Alan Ritchson; Dennis Quaid; Stephan James; Jai Courtney; Esai Morales; Keiynan Lonsdale; Daniel Webber
- Cinematography: Aaron Morton
- Edited by: Andy Canny
- Music by: Dmitri Golovko
- Production companies: Lionsgate; Hidden Pictures; Huge Film; Range Media Partners; Emu Creek Pictures
- Distributed by: Roadshow Films (Australia); Netflix (international)
- Release dates: February 12, 2026 (Australia); March 6, 2026 (Netflix)
- Running time: 107 minutes
- Countries: Australia; United States
- Language: English
- Budget: US$80 million
- Box office: US$57,194

War Machine is a 2026 military science fiction action film directed, co-produced, and co-written by Patrick Hughes. It stars Alan Ritchson, Dennis Quaid, Stephan James, Jai Courtney, Esai Morales, Keiynan Lonsdale, and Daniel Webber. In the film, a staff sergeant encounters an otherworldly killing machine while on a grueling training exercise.

The film was given a very limited theatrical release in Australia starting on 12 February 2026, before releasing on Netflix on March 6, 2026. The film received mixed reviews from critics, praising it as a fun, old-school, throwback action movie despite its familiar, formulaic storyline. A sequel is in development. It is the 9th most watched Netflix film of all time.

At the 2026 Screen Music Awards, music by Dmitri Golovko was nominated for Best Feature Film Score of the Year.

== Plot ==
In Afghanistan, an unnamed US Army Staff Sergeant arrives to help his brother's broken-down convoy. His brother tries to convince him that they should apply to become Army Rangers, when they are attacked by Taliban insurgents. Everyone is killed except the Staff Sergeant, who suffers a severe knee injury. He tries to carry his mortally wounded brother back to base but passes out before making it.

Two years later, the Staff Sergeant attends Ranger Assessment Selection Program in Colorado to earn assignment to a battalion of the consolidated 75th Ranger Regiment, and is given the candidate number of 81. 81 excels at training but does not bond with his fellow recruits and refuses the role of team leader, despite his record. After he allows himself to nearly drown during an underwater exercise, regiment leaders Sergeant Major Sheridan and First Sergeant Torres question his mental state due to his PTSD and insist he step down from the program to recuperate, but 81 refuses. Sheridan and Torres allow him to advance and assign him team leader for the final exercise, the Death March, a simulated mission in the forest to destroy a classified aircraft and rescue its pilot. Around that time, reports come out of a suspected asteroid flying past the planet and breaking off in pieces.

During the exercise, the team is startled by an unknown blast from the sky, which knocks out communications. They find a strange-looking object by the creek, which the team believes to be the classified aircraft from the training exercise. After detonating it with explosives, it remains undamaged and transforms into a walking machine that starts targeting and killing the team; they are unable to fight back as they are carrying blank rounds. 81's second-in-command 7's leg is severely broken and wounded, forcing the other recruits to carry him. After the attack, only 81, 7, 15, 44, 60, 109, and 23 are left alive. The machine generates a strong magnetic field which affects their compasses, allowing them to sense when it is near. After escaping down river, they reach the cadre posing as the enemy force as part of the Death March and find they have been eliminated by the machine. An emotional 15 confronts 81 about his coldness. He tells 81 not all of them are "war heroes". 81 tells what happened to his brother, explaining that his attitude stems from his failure to save his brother's life instead being rewarded with a medal. Seeing traces of impact from a distant mountaintop to the valley below, they deduce the machine is extraterrestrial and try to make it back to base in an M1117 ASV. As the machine gives chase, the team finds live ammunition from assault rifles and machine guns, but discover its tough armor is impenetrable to small arms fire. 81 manages to subdue the machine with a rockslide created by a grenade launcher, but the ASV is destroyed with only 81 and 7 left alive.

After seeing the machine send up a mysterious signal into space, 81 takes 7 into the forest. 7 reveals that he knew 81's brother. 81 realizes that the machine has a ventilation system and lures it towards a quarry they had passed at the beginning of the exercise. 81 pours gravel into the ventilation system, causing the machine to overheat and explode. 81 successfully makes it back to the damaged Ranger training base with 7, and he is accepted into the 75th Ranger Regiment. Sheridan and Torres reveal that the suspected asteroid was actually an army of alien machines and they have started a global war with humankind. When 81 reveals the machines' ventilation system is a weakness, Sheridan and Torres send the information to CENTCOM and he is assigned to lead the next assault against the machines.

== Cast ==
- Alan Ritchson as 81
- Blake Richardson as 15
- Keiynan Lonsdale as 60
- Daniel Webber as 57
- Jai Courtney as Squad leader (81's brother)
- Esai Morales as 1SG Torres
- Stephan James as 7
- Dennis Quaid as SGM Sheridan

== Production ==
Patrick Hughes came up with the idea for War Machine in 2017. In November 2021, it was reported that Hughes had been hired to write and direct the film at Lionsgate. Alan Ritchson was cast in the lead role in March 2024. In September 2024, Dennis Quaid, Stephan James, Jai Courtney, Esai Morales, Keiynan Lonsdale, and Daniel Webber rounded out the cast of the film.

Principal photography began on September 16, 2024, in Victoria, Australia and Queenstown, New Zealand with Aaron Morton serving as the cinematographer. Locations included Bright, Myrtleford, Melbourne and Docklands Studios Melbourne. Filming wrapped on December 14, 2024.

Dmitri Golovko composed the score for the film.

== Release ==
War Machine was originally developed with the intention to release it theatrically. However, due to high demand from streaming platforms, the decision was made to release the film via Netflix. To qualify for an additional 10% in tax rebates, an Australian theatrical release was required. War Machine was given a very limited theatrical release in Australia on February 12, 2026, with a five-week run on 52 screens which made A$82,000.

Its main release, to global markets, was on Netflix on March 6, 2026. In its first five weeks, the film had more than 118 million views. It was the number one film globally on Netflix for two weeks, reached the top 10 in 93 countries, and was number one in 87 of them.

== Critical response ==
On the review aggregator website Rotten Tomatoes, 66% of 65 critics' reviews are positive, with an average rating of 6.0/10. The website's consensus reads: "Providing Alan Ritchson an ideal vehicle to flex his brawny charisma, War Machine occasionally clanks when it comes to character depth but otherwise soldiers on to deliver an awesome dose of action spectacle." Metacritic, which uses a weighted average, assigned the film a score of 54 out of 100, based on 11 critics, indicating "mixed or average" reviews.

== Future ==
Following the positive reception to War Machine, Alan Ritchson expressed interest in reprising his lead role in future installments. The actor stated that there is currently "tons" of story material in place for follow-up movies, while referring to a sequel as "War Machines"; while writer/director Patrick Hughes in the joint-interview confirmed that he has a larger story-arc for sequels should they be greenlit. In another interview Patrick Hughes stated that while the first film was created standalone, he intends that the movie's ending could create a franchise. According to a report on June 2, 2026, Netflix has begun developing a sequel to the film, with Hughes set to return as writer and director.
