= The Hitman's Bodyguard =

2017 film directed by Patrick Hughes

- Theatrical release poster
- Directed by: Patrick Hughes
- Written by: Tom O'Connor
- Produced by: Mark Gill; John Thompson; Matt O'Toole; Les Weldon
- Starring: Ryan Reynolds; Samuel L. Jackson; Gary Oldman; Salma Hayek; Élodie Yung; Joaquim de Almeida; Kirsty Mitchell; Richard E. Grant
- Cinematography: Jules O'Loughlin
- Edited by: Jake Roberts
- Music by: Atli Örvarsson
- Production companies: Summit Entertainment; Millennium Media; Cristal Pictures
- Distributed by: Lionsgate
- Release date: August 18, 2017
- Running time: 118 minutes
- Countries: Bulgaria; Canada; Hong Kong; Netherlands; United States
- Language: English
- Budget: $30–69 million
- Box office: $183.4 million

The Hitman's Bodyguard is a 2017 action comedy film directed by Patrick Hughes and written by Tom O'Connor. It stars Ryan Reynolds, Samuel L. Jackson, Gary Oldman and Salma Hayek. In the film, Michael Bryce (Reynolds) must protect Darius Kincaid (Jackson), an imprisoned hitman on his way to testify at the International Criminal Court against a sadistic Eastern European dictator Vladislav Dukhovich (Oldman).

The Hitman's Bodyguard was released in the United States on 18 August 2017 and grossed $183 million worldwide. It received mixed reviews from critics, who praised its performances, action sequences, and the chemistry between Reynolds and Jackson, but criticized its plot and execution. A sequel titled Hitman's Wife's Bodyguard was released on 16 June 2021.

== Plot ==
Michael Bryce lives a luxurious life as a successful UK-based private bodyguard, until his client, Takashi Kurosawa, an international arms dealer, is assassinated on his watch. Two years later, the fallen-from-grace Bryce survives by protecting drug-addicted corporate executives.

Meanwhile, Vladislav Dukhovich, the vicious Belarusian dictator, who was dethroned after a coup, is on trial for crimes against humanity at the International Criminal Court. Unable to secure solid evidence or testimony against him, the prosecution's last hope is hitman Darius Kincaid, currently incarcerated in England, who agrees to testify against Dukhovich in exchange for the release of his wife, Sonia, from prison. Led by Interpol Agent Amelia Roussel, an armed convoy escorts him from the UK to the International Criminal Court in The Hague.

With the aid of treacherous Interpol Assistant Director Jean Foucher, Dukhovich's men successfully ambush the convoy as it passes through Coventry and kill most of the security team. Darius eliminates the attackers, and Amelia, the sole survivor, takes him to an Interpol safehouse in the city where Darius treats a gunshot wound in his leg. Realizing that the agency cannot be entrusted with the mission due to a possible leak, she enlists the help of her ex-boyfriend, Bryce, to escort and protect Darius on the way to The Hague, knowing both men have a past issue together.

They hitchhike to a ferry going to Amsterdam, during which Darius confides in Bryce about his first kill, a racist who murdered his preacher father. After reaching the safehouse, Darius slips away from Bryce's surveillance in order to provide a view of flowers for Sonia, who is being held prisoner there. Darius later reveals to Bryce that he was the one who killed Kurosawa, having spotted him by chance while on another job, causing an outraged Bryce to abandon him. As Bryce evaluates his past mistakes at a beer stand, Dukhovich's men attack Darius. Bryce regains his composure and helps him escape, but is captured in the process. As he is being tortured, Darius arrives and rescues him. After reconciling their differences, they arrive at The Hague with seconds to spare. Darius testifies that Dukhovich hired him to assassinate a political rival, and he also witnessed Dukhovich carry out a mass execution and uploaded the massacre photos to a secret FTP site that he provides to the court.

Dukhovich admits guilt in which he defends his actions, and then resorts to his backup plan, bombing the courthouse to escape. Foucher leaves the courtroom before the bombing, and Amelia deduces he was the traitor. In the confusion after the bomb goes off, Dukhovich seizes a gun to kill Darius, but Bryce dives in front of the bullet, taking the hit. Injured, he tells Darius to stop Dukhovich.

Foucher and Amelia struggle until Bryce shoots him to save Amelia. Darius pursues Dukhovich to the roof, where he attempts to escape by a helicopter his men had hijacked. Darius destroys it and angrily kicks Dukhovich off the roof to his death for shooting Bryce.

Darius is rearrested for his various crimes, but breaks out of Belmarsh Prison several months later, so he and Sonia can celebrate their anniversary in the bar in Honduras where they first met, as a wild bar brawl breaks out around them.

== Cast ==
- Ryan Reynolds as Michael Bryce, a disgraced triple-A rated executive protection agent and CIA officer
- Samuel L. Jackson as Darius Kincaid, a foul-mouthed, infamous hitman and Sonia's husband
  - Dijarn Campbell as young Kincaid
- Gary Oldman as Vladislav Dukhovich, the dictatorial President of Belarus and later a terrorist leader
- Salma Hayek as Sonia Kincaid, Darius's wife
- Élodie Yung as Amelia Roussel, an Interpol agent and Michael's ex-girlfriend
- Joaquim de Almeida as Jean Foucher, the French Assistant Director of Interpol and Dukhovich's mole
- Barry Atsma as Moreno, the lead prosecution lawyer
- Tine Joustra as Renata Casoria, Director of Interpol
- Kirsty Mitchell as Rebecca Harr, Kincaid's lawyer
- Sam Hazeldine as Garrett, a National Crime Agency officer
- Mikhail Gorevoy as Litvin, Dukhovich's lead defense lawyer
- Richard E. Grant as Mr. Seifert, a drug-addicted corporate executive and client of Bryce's
- Rod Hallett as Professor Asimov, a political opponent of Dukhovich's, and witness against him
- Yuri Kolokolnikov as Ivan, Dukhovich's chief lieutenant
- Ori Pfeffer as Vacklin, one of Dukhovich's henchmen
- Georgie Glen as ICC Lead Judge

Additionally, Joséphine de La Baume and the film's director Patrick Hughes appear as interpol agents, while Donna Preston portrays Sonia's cell mate.

== Production ==
=== Development ===
In May 2011, Skydance Media acquired the action script The Hitman's Bodyguard written by Tom O'Connor. The script was among the top 2011 Black List of unproduced screenplays. While originally intended as a drama, the script underwent a "frantic" two-week rewrite to be remade into a comedy several weeks prior to filming.

On November 4, 2015, Ryan Reynolds, Samuel L. Jackson, and Gary Oldman were cast in the film, which Jeff Wadlow would direct for Millennium Films. Producers were to be Mark Gill, John Thompson, Matt O'Toole, and Les Weldon. On February 23, 2016, Élodie Yung and Salma Hayek were cast in the film, which Lionsgate would distribute in the United States. On March 9, 2016, Wadlow was reported to have exited the film and Patrick Hughes signed on to direct it.

=== Filming ===
Principal photography began on April 2, 2016, in London, Amsterdam, and Sofia. Originally, just one scene was to be shot in Amsterdam, but when Hughes visited the location and saw its surroundings, he decided to move some "London scenes" to the old inner city of Amsterdam. The Coventry-based scenes were also filmed in London.

== Reception ==
=== Box office ===
The Hitman's Bodyguard grossed $75.5 million in the United States and Canada and $107.9 million in other countries for a worldwide total of $176.6 million, against a production budget between $30 and 69 million.

In North America, The Hitman's Bodyguard was released alongside Logan Lucky and the wide expansion of Wind River, and was projected to gross $17–20 million from 3,350 theaters in its opening weekend. The film made $8 million on its first day (including $1.65 million from Thursday night previews). It went on to open to $21.4 million, topping the box office. In its second weekend, the film made $10.3 million, finishing first at the box office in what was the combined lowest-grossing weekend since September 2001. The film made another $10.5 million the following weekend, becoming the third film of 2017 to finish atop the box office for three straight weeks. However, while it made an estimated $12.9 million over the four-day Labor Day weekend, this too was a historically low-grossing weekend for movies— indeed the worst combined holiday weekend since 1998.

=== Critical response ===
On review aggregator website Rotten Tomatoes, the film holds an approval rating of 44% based on 226 reviews, and an average rating of 5.2/10. The site's critical consensus reads, "The Hitman's Bodyguard coasts on Samuel L. Jackson and Ryan Reynolds' banter—but doesn't get enough mileage to power past an overabundance of action-comedy clichés." On Metacritic, which assigns a normalized rating to reviews, the film has a weighted average score 47 out of 100, based on 42 reviews, indicating "mixed or average reviews". Audiences polled by CinemaScore gave the film an average grade of "B+" on an A+ to F scale, while PostTrak reported filmgoers gave it an 80% overall positive score and a 57% "definite recommend".

Peter Debruge of Variety gave the film a positive review and called it a pleasant late-summer surprise, writing: "The Hitman's Bodyguard is about as close to a live-action cartoon as you're likely to get this year... That's not a style that works much of the time... but in the hands of The Expendables 3 helmer Patrick Hughes—and more importantly, owing to the chemistry of stars Samuel L. Jackson and Ryan Reynolds—it makes for a delightfully ridiculous screwball action comedy." Writing for Rolling Stone, Peter Travers praised the cast, giving it 2.5 stars out of 4 and saying, "Reynolds and Jackson make this summer lunacy go down easy with their banter and bullet-dodging skills. They're the only reason that The Hitman's Bodyguard doesn't completely sink into the generic quicksand from whence it came."

== Sequel ==
In May 2018, it was announced that Reynolds, Jackson, and Hayek were in early talks to reprise their roles for a sequel, titled Hitman's Wife's Bodyguard, with plans to begin filming later in the year. Production on the sequel began in March 2019, with Frank Grillo, Antonio Banderas, and Morgan Freeman joining the cast of the film.
