= William Franklyn-Miller =

British actor (born 2004)

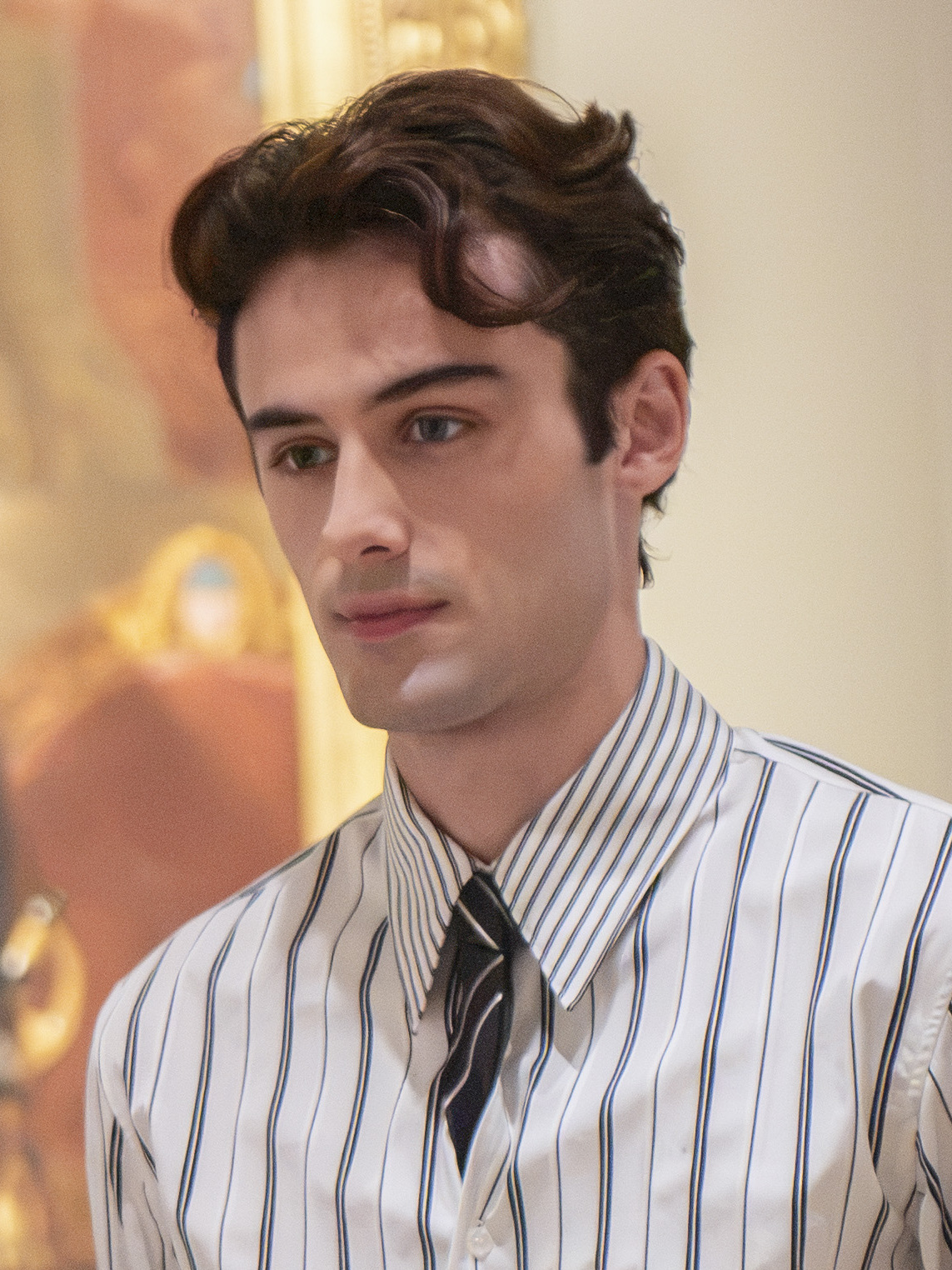
- Franklyn-Miller in 2026
- Born: William Oliver Franklyn-Miller; 25 March 2004 (age 22); Devon, England
- Occupation: Actor
- Years active: 2016–present

William Oliver Franklyn-Miller (born 25 March 2004) is a British actor. He began his career as a child actor. He has since appeared in the Chinese film Dongji Rescue (2025) and starred in the titular role of the period war film Young Washington (2026).

== Early life and education ==
Franklyn-Miller was born in the county of Devon on 25 March 2004. He is the son of a doctor. From the age of six, he lived variously in Australia, England, Qatar and Ireland. He completed his GCSEs with the online school King's InterHigh in 2020 and his A Levels at Millfield in Somerset in 2022.

== Career ==
Franklyn-Miller began modeling in his youth before beginning a career in acting. He made his television debut portraying young Jack in a 2016 episode of the ABC TV series Jack Irish. This was followed by appearances in the Australian soap opera Neighbours and the CW series Arrow.

In 2019, Franklyn-Miller portrayed a young version of Richard Madden's titular character in the Rai 1 historical drama Medici. He also played Ezra Grant in the fourth season of the Brat web series Chicken Girls, as well as the films Spring Breakaway and Intern-in-Chief. Franklyn-Miller made his feature film debut as Carl in the 2020 children's fantasy film Four Kids and It.

Franklyn-Miller was cast as a British medic in the Chinese film Dongji Rescue (2025) following a two-minute audition. He performed professional stunts for the first time during the production of the film. He subsequently made his debut as a lead in the 2026 film Young Washington, in which he starred as George Washington. He did weeks of research and accent work to prepare to portray Washington, which he called a "dream role". In a review of Young Washington, Rick Bentley of KGET praised Franklyn-Miller's performance, calling him "a worthy acting partner in any scene with the veteran [actors in the film]". Owen Gleiberman of Variety described him as "model-handsome" and "[not] a bad actor", while Frank Schenk of The Hollywood Reporter criticized Franklyn-Miller's "air of blankness" throughout the film.

== Filmography ==
=== Film ===
Year	Title	Role	Notes
2016	A Fish Out of Water	Zac	Short film
2018	The Resurgence	Will	Short film
2020	Four Kids and It	Carl	
2025	Dongji Rescue	Thomas Newman	
2026	Young Washington	George Washington	

=== Television ===
Year	Title	Role	Notes
2016	Jack Irish	Young Jack	1 episode
2017	Neighbours	Brandon Henley	1 episode
2017	Arrow	Young Joe Wilson	2 episodes
2018	Medici	Giovanni de' Medici	4 episodes

=== Web ===
Year	Title	Role	Notes
2019	Spring Breakway	Ezra Grant	Brat TV film
2019	Chicken Girls	Ezra Grant	11 episodes (season 4)
2019	Intern-in-Chief	Ezra Grant	Brat TV film
