= The Political Machine 2008 =

2008 video game

- Box art
- Developer: Stardock
- Publisher: Ubisoft
- Platform: Microsoft Windows
- Release: NA: June 24, 2008; EU: October 17, 2008
- Genre: Government simulation
- Modes: Single-player, multiplayer

The Political Machine 2008 is a government simulation game from Stardock and the second game in The Political Machine series, in which the player leads a campaign to elect the President of the United States. The player accomplishes this goal by traveling from state to state and engaging in a variety of activities to either raise money or raise poll numbers. It is the sequel to The Political Machine released in 2004. The Political Machine 2008 features new candidates such as Barack Obama and John McCain. The game focuses on much more current issues and the constant need for money.

The game features three more scenarios, election in the American Civil War, an election taking place in an alternative European Union, and an alien world.

The developers said that they would add new content into the game before November 4 (the election) and update the issues as they changed in importance. New candidates were also planned once minor bugs were ironed out.

== Presidential candidates ==
=== Democrats ===
- Fmr. President Bill Clinton (D-AR)
- Secretary of State Hillary Clinton (D-NY)
- Fmr. Sen. John Edwards (D-NC)
- Fmr. Vice President Al Gore (D-TN)
- Sen. John Kerry (D-MA)
- Sen. Barack Obama (D-IL)
- Gov. Bill Richardson (D-NM)
- Fmr. President Jimmy Carter (D-GA) - unlock
- Fmr. President John F Kennedy (D-MA) - unlock
- Fmr. President Lyndon B. Johnson (D-TX) - unlock
- Fmr. President Woodrow Wilson (D-NJ) - unlock
- Fmr. President Thomas Jefferson (DR-VA) - unlock
- Fmr. Senator Mike Gravel (D-AK) - download
- Rep. Dennis Kucinich (D-OH) - download
- Sen. Joe Biden (D-DE) - download

=== Republicans ===
A screenshot of the main screen, showing candidates Barack Obama and John McCain

- Lord Kona (fictional)
- President George W. Bush (R-TX)
- Vice President Dick Cheney (R-WY)
- Fmr. New York City Mayor Rudy Giuliani (R-NY)
- Sen. John McCain (R-AZ)
- Rep. Ron Paul (R-TX)
- Fmr. Governor Mitt Romney (R-MA)
- Fmr. President Ulysses S. Grant (R-OH) - unlock
- Fmr. President Richard Nixon (R-CA) - unlock
- Fmr. President Ronald Reagan (R-CA) - unlock
- Fmr. President Theodore Roosevelt (R-NY) - unlock
- Fmr. President George Washington (VA) -unlock
- Fmr. President Abraham Lincoln (R-IL) - unlock
- Fmr. Governor Mike Huckabee (R-AR) - download
- Governor Sarah Palin (R-AK) - download

It is not possible to run as a third-party or independent candidate.

== Reception ==
Reception

Aggregate score
Aggregator	Score
Metacritic	73/100

Review scores
Publication	Score
1Up.com	C
GamePro	4.5/5
GameSpot	7.5/10
GameSpy	3.5/5
IGN	7.3/10
PC Format	79%
PC Gamer (US)	81%
PC Zone	81%
Wired	7/10

The game received "average" reviews according to video game review aggregator website Metacritic. IT Reviews said that "the gameplay is sufficiently engrossing and varied to keep your interest". GameSpy called it "a really solid 'beer & pretzels' strategy game". 1UP.com complained that "with more focus on the real-world conflicts and unpredictable events that plague campaigns, running for office might be a bit less tiresome".
