= Second Chance Heroes =

2014 video game

- Developer: Rocket City Studios
- Platforms: iOS; Microsoft Windows; OS X PlayStation Network
- Release: iOS; February 17, 2014; Microsoft Windows, OS X July 4, 2014; PlayStation Network; September 30, 2014
- Genres: Action role-playing, hack and slash
- Modes: Single-player, multiplayer

Second Chance Heroes is a 2014 action role-playing hack and slash video game by Canadian indie developer Rocket City Studios that revolves around clones of historical figures fighting enemy forces in an apocalyptic arena. It was released on July 4, 2014. Shortly after the games release it was removed from all app stores and digital marketplaces. The reason for the removal is unknown.

== Gameplay ==
The game featured a variety of clones of historical figures including Abraham Lincoln, Joan of Arc, Napoleon and Elizabeth I fighting their way through swarms of enemies during 26 apocalyptic levels.

== Releases ==
=== iOS edition ===
On February 17, 2014, Rocket City Studios released an iOS version of Second Chance Heroes in the App Store.

=== Microsoft Windows, OS X ===
The Microsoft Windows and OS X versions of the game were originally due to be released on June 20, 2014, but due to the Steam Summer Sale, the game was delayed until July 4, 2014.

== Reception ==
=== Critical reception ===
Reception

Aggregate scores
Aggregator	Score
GameRankings	(iOS) 83.33%
Metacritic	(iOS) 84/100

Second Chance Heroes received generally positive reviews on iOS from critics, attaining scores of 83.33% and 84/100 on aggregate review websites GameRankings and Metacritic respectively.
