= The Political Machine 2024 =

- Developer: Stardock
- Publisher: Stardock
- Platform: Microsoft Windows
- Release: May 2nd, 2024
- Genre: Government simulation
- Modes: Single-player, multiplayer

The Political Machine 2024 is a government simulation game from Stardock and the 6th installment in the Political Machine series. In the game, you select a politician, either a pre-made one or one that you have made yourself, and compete in the 2024 presidential election cycle. The game was released on May 2, 2024 on PC and macOS.

Introduced for the first time in the series are primaries, where four candidates compete to become their party's nominee, presidential debates, Political Action Cards, and independent candidates. Independent candidates can run either as Democrats or Republicans, but they cannot run as third-party candidates.

== Presidential candidates ==
=== Democrats ===
- Al Gore (v1.01 update)
- Andrew Yang
- Barack Obama (v1.01 update)
- Bernie Sanders
- Bill Clinton (v1.01 update)
- Dean Phillips
- Elizabeth Warren
- Hillary Clinton
- Jimmy Carter (v1.01 update)
- Joe Biden
- John Kerry (v1.01 update)
- Kamala Harris
- Marianne Williamson
- Martin O'Malley (v1.01 update)
- Michael Bloomberg
- Pete Buttigieg
- Tim Walz (v1.13 update)

=== Republicans ===
- Chris Christie
- Dan Crenshaw
- Donald Trump
- Doug Burgum
- Dwight D. Eisenhower (v1.01 update)
- George H. W. Bush (v1.01 update)
- George W. Bush (v1.01 update)
- JD Vance (v1.12 update)
- Mike Pence
- Mitt Romney (v1.01 update)
- Nikki Haley
- Richard Nixon (v1.01 update)
- Ronald Reagan (v1.01 update)
- Ron DeSantis
- Ted Cruz
- Tim Scott
- Vivek Ramaswamy

=== Independents ===
- Jill Stein (v1.01 update)
- Ralph Nader (v1.01 update)
- Robert F. Kennedy Jr.
- Ross Perot (v1.01 update)

== Reception ==
Softpedia gave the game an 85, saying that it has a "strong simulation engine", praising the variety of candidates and tactical approaches, and calling the primary elections a "great idea". Vandal gave a score of 70, saying, "Despite its deep gameplay and accurate portrayal of political trends, the game suffers from a chaotic interface and lacks a dynamic tutorial, making it less accessible for newcomers." Gaming Age gave a 60, saying, "It's a step up from The Political Machine 2020, but The Political Machine 2024 is still far from being the in-depth election sim it promises itself to be."
