= The Political Machine 2020 =

Government simulation videogame

- Developer: Stardock
- Publishers: Stardock (PC); Hitcents (Android, iOS)
- Platforms: Android; iOS; Microsoft Windows
- Release: Microsoft Windows: WW: March 3, 2020; Android, iOS: WW: July 14, 2020
- Genre: Government simulation
- Modes: Single-player, multiplayer

The Political Machine 2020 is a government simulation game from Stardock and the fifth game in the Political Machine series, in which the player leads a campaign to elect the President of the United States. The player accomplishes this goal by traveling from state to state and engaging in a variety of activities to either raise money or raise poll numbers. The game was released on March 3, 2020.

== Presidential candidates ==
=== Democrats ===
Democratic party candidates
| Candidate | Home State | Ideology |
|---|---|---|
| Al Gore | Tennessee | Establishment Democrat |
| Alexander Hamilton (Note: Available as part of the Founding Fathers DLC) | New York | Federalist |
| Alexandria Ocasio-Cortez | New York | Democratic Socialism |
| Amy Klobuchar | Minnesota | Establishment Democrat |
| Andrew Yang | New York | Yang Singularity |
| Barack Obama | Illinois | Hope and Change |
| Bernie Sanders | Vermont | Democratic Socialism |
| Bill Clinton | Arkansas | Establishment Democrat |
| Catherine Cortez Masto | Nevada | Establishment Democrat |
| Elizabeth Warren | Massachusetts | Democratic Socialism |
| George Washington (Note: Can be played as either a Democrat or a Republican) | Virginia | Federalist |
| Hillary Clinton | New York | Progressivism |
| Joe Biden | Delaware | Biden Liberalism |
| John Adams | Massachusetts | Federalist |
| Kamala Harris | California | Establishment Democrat |
| Massive Comet (Fictional character) | California | Giant Meteorism |
| Michael Bloomberg | New York | Establishment Democrat |
| Pete Buttigieg | Indiana | Establishment Democrat |
| Tulsi Gabbard | Hawaii | Tulsi's Better World |
| Valentino Rutabach (Fictional character) | New Mexico | Lunacy |

=== Republicans ===
Republican party candidates
| Candidate | Home State | Ideology |
|---|---|---|
| Barry Goldwater | Arizona | Conservatism |
| Dan Crenshaw | Texas | Conservatism |
| Donald Trump | Florida | Trumpian Populism |
| George Washington | Virginia | Federalist |
| George W. Bush | Texas | Compassionate Conservatism |
| Giant Meteor (Fictional character) | California | Giant Meteorism |
| James Madison | Virginia | Democratic Republicanism |
| Jeb Bush | Florida | Compassionate Conservatism |
| John McCain | Arizona | Straight Talk Express |
| Mike Pence | Indiana | Trumpian Populism |
| Mitch McConnell | Kentucky | Establishment Republican |
| Mitt Romney | Utah | Establishment Republican |
| Rand Paul | Kentucky | Libertarianism |
| Ronald Reagan | California | Conservatism |
| Sarah Palin | Alaska | Conservatism |
| Ted Cruz | Texas | Conservatism |
| Thomas Jefferson | Virginia | Democratic Republicanism |
| Valentino Rutabach (Fictional character) | New Mexico | Lunacy |

It is not possible to run as a third-party or independent candidate.

== Reception ==
Giving it a rating of 65, New Game Network described the game as "fairly shallow, and there seems to be a number of steps back from the 2016 version - aside from the improved visuals." VentureBeat says "as a bare-bones remake of an existing game, it's not bad," and "it whets my appetite for a more sophisticated and realistic simulation".
