= The Political Machine 2016 =

2016 video game

- Developer: Stardock
- Publisher: Stardock
- Platform: Microsoft Windows
- Release: February 4, 2016
- Genre: Government simulation
- Modes: Single-player, multiplayer

The Political Machine 2016 is a government simulation game from Stardock and the fourth game in the Political Machine series, in which the player leads a campaign to elect the President of the United States. The player accomplishes this goal by traveling from state to state and engaging in a variety of activities to either raise money or raise poll numbers. An early access version of the game was released on Steam on November 17, 2015, with the full game releasing on February 4, 2016.

== Presidential candidates ==
=== Democrats ===
- President Thomas Jefferson (DR-VA) (Unlockable, DLC)
- President John F. Kennedy (D-MA) (Unlockable, DLC)
- President Bill Clinton (D-AR)
- President Barack Obama (D-IL) (v1.1 update)
- Secretary of State Hillary Clinton (D-NY)
- Vice President Al Gore (D-TN)

=== Republicans ===
- President George Washington (VA) (Unlockable, DLC)
- President Abraham Lincoln (R-IL) (Unlockable, DLC)
- President Theodore Roosevelt (R-NY) (Unlockable, DLC)
- President Richard Nixon (R-CA) (Unlockable, DLC)
- President Ronald Reagan (R-CA) (Unlockable, DLC)
- Businessman Donald Trump (R-NY)
- Governor Mitt Romney (R-MA) (v1.1 update)

It is not possible to run as a third-party or independent candidate.

== Reception ==
Reception

Aggregate score
Aggregator	Score
Metacritic	72/100

The game received "average" reviews according to video game review aggregator platform Metacritic.
