= The Political Machine 2012 =

2012 video game

- Developer: Stardock
- Publisher: Stardock
- Platform: Microsoft Windows
- Release: July 31, 2012
- Genre: Government simulation
- Modes: Single-player, multiplayer

The Political Machine 2012 is a government simulation game from Stardock and the third game in The Political Machine series, in which the player leads a campaign to elect the President of the United States. The player accomplishes this goal by traveling from state to state and engaging in a variety of activities to either raise money or raise poll numbers.

== Presidential candidates ==
=== Democrats ===
- President Thomas Jefferson (DR-VA) (v1.02 update)
- President John F. Kennedy (D-MA) (v1.02 update)
- President Bill Clinton (D-AR) (v1.02 update)
- President Barack Obama (D-IL)
- Secretary of State Hillary Clinton (D-NY)
- Vice President Al Gore (D-TN)
- First Lady Michelle Obama (D-IL)
- Rep. Dennis Kucinich (D-OH)
- Sen. Al Franken (D-MN)

=== Republicans ===
- President George Washington (VA) (v1.02 update)
- President Abraham Lincoln (R-IL) (v1.02 update)
- President Theodore Roosevelt (R-NY) (v1.02 update)
- President Richard Nixon (R-CA) (v1.02 update)
- President Ronald Reagan (R-CA) (v1.02 update)
- Governor Mitt Romney (R-MA)
- Fmr. Speaker Newt Ginrich (R-GA)
- Businessman Donald Trump (R-NY)

It is not possible to run as a third-party or independent candidate.

== Reception ==
Reception

Aggregate score
Aggregator	Score
Metacritic	54/100

Review scores
Publication	Score
GameSpot	6/10
IGN	6.5/10

The game received "mixed" reviews according to video game review aggregator platform Metacritic.
