= Patrick Hughes (filmmaker) =

Australian film director (born 1978)

- Born: 13 May 1978 (age 48); Black Rock, Victoria, Australia
- Occupation: Filmmaker

Patrick Hughes (born 13 May 1978) is an Australian filmmaker, best known for directing and screenwriting Red Hill (2010), The Expendables 3 (2014), The Hitman's Bodyguard (2017), The Hitman's Wife's Bodyguard (2021) and War Machine (2026).

== Early life ==
Hughes was born in Black Rock, a suburb of Melbourne. He started making short films when he was young. Hughes attended film school at the Victorian College of the Arts, graduating in 1999.

== Career ==
After making a string of high-profile commercials and shorts, and multiple failed attempts to option a script for an action/western film, he decided to direct it himself under a short schedule and low budget, in what would eventually become the 2010 film Red Hill starring Ryan Kwanten, Steve Bisley and Tom E. Lewis.

Hughes' various commercials and previous 2008 short film Signs caught the attention of Hollywood star Sylvester Stallone, who was looking for new talent to direct the third installment of The Expendables franchise. Hughes filmed The Expendables 3 from August to October 2013 and the film held its world premiere in London on 4 August 2014.

Hughes was announced as the director of the remake of the 2011 Indonesian action film The Raid: Redemption with Taylor Kitsch to star, but by October 2015 once both Kitsch and Screen Gems had dropped out of the project Hughes also dropped out as director.

Hughes next directed the 2017 action comedy film The Hitman's Bodyguard, starring Ryan Reynolds, Samuel L. Jackson, Gary Oldman, and Salma Hayek, which earned $180.6 million worldwide against a production budget between $30–69 million. A sequel, Hitman’s Wife’s Bodyguard, also directed by Hughes with Reynolds, Jackson, and Hayek returning in addition to Antonio Banderas and Morgan Freeman, was released on 16 June 2021, after being delayed previously to 20 August 2021 from an original release date of 28 August 2020 because of the COVID-19 pandemic.

In 2021, Hughes established his own film production company, Huge Films, in partnership with Greg McLean and James Beaufort.

== Filmography ==
Short film

Year	Title	Director	Writer	Producer
2000	The Director	Yes	Yes	Co-producer
2001	The Lighter	Yes	Yes	Yes
2008	Signs	Yes	No	No

Feature film

Year	Title	Director	Writer	Producer
2010	Red Hill	Yes	Yes	Yes
2014	The Expendables 3	Yes	No	No
2017	The Hitman's Bodyguard	Yes	No	No
2021	Hitman's Wife's Bodyguard	Yes	No	No
2022	The Man from Toronto	Yes	No	No
2026	War Machine	Yes	Yes	Yes
TBA	Untitled Mike Thornton biopic film	Yes	No	No
