= Fei Zhenxiang =

Chinese actor and director

- 费振翔
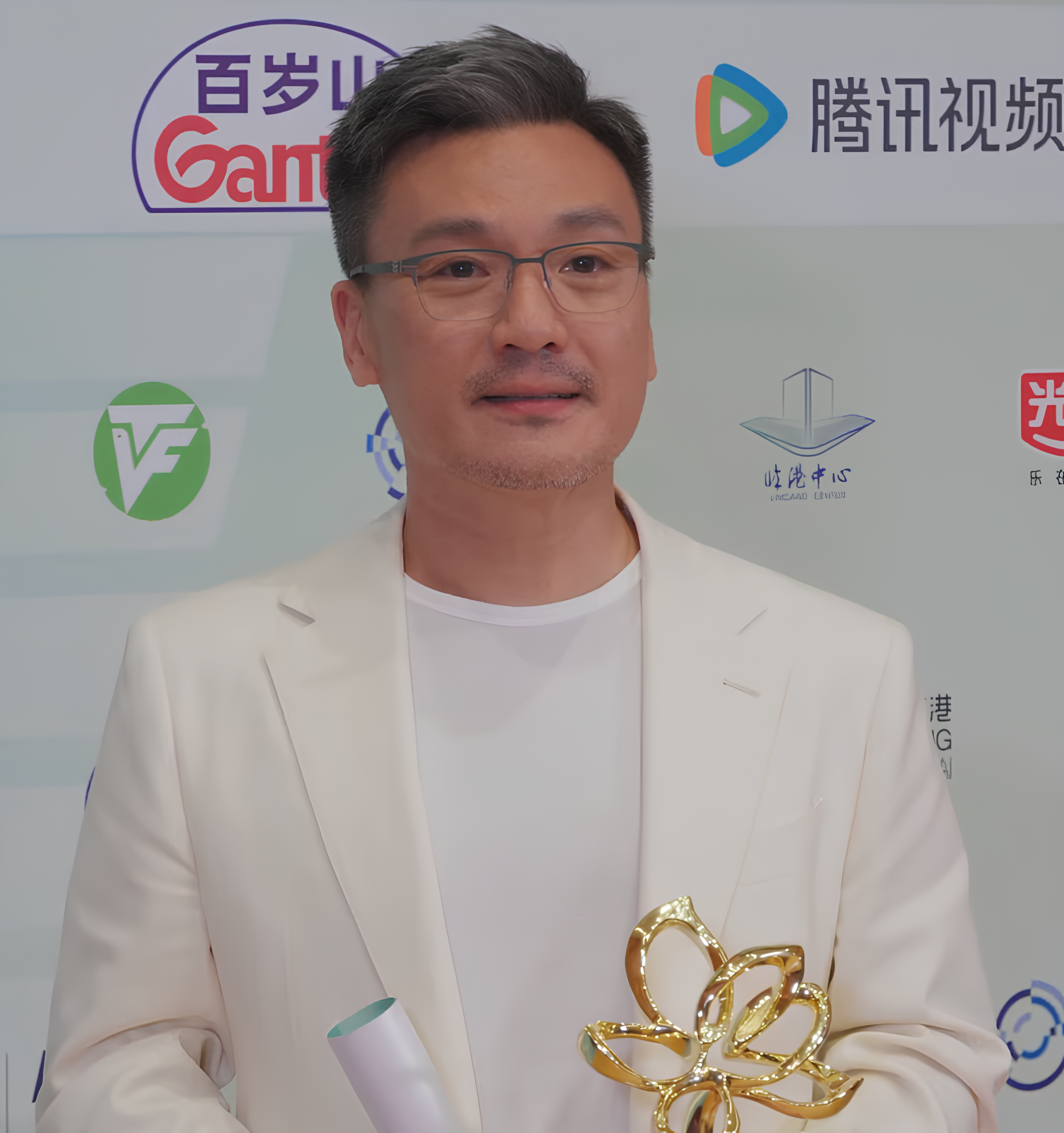
- Fei Zhenxiang at the closing ceremony of the 30th Shanghai Television Festival on 27 June 2025
- Born: 7 December 1978 (age 47); Beijing, China
- Education: Beijing Academy of Performing Arts
- Occupations: Actor, director
- Years active: 1982–present

Chinese name
- Simplified Chinese: 费振翔
- Traditional Chinese: 費振翔
Transcriptions
Standard Mandarin
- Hanyu Pinyin: Fèi Zhènxiáng

Birth name
- Simplified Chinese: 费洋
- Traditional Chinese: 費洋
Transcriptions
Standard Mandarin
- Hanyu Pinyin: Fèi Yáng

Fei Zhenxiang (Chinese: 费振翔; born 2 December 1978) is a Chinese actor and director best for his role as Sun Wukong in Journey to the West.

== Biography ==
Fei was born into a family of Peking Opera performers in Beijing, on 2 December 1978.

In 1982, at the age of 4, Fei made his debut on stage and participated in the Sino-Japanese Friendship Celebration, co-performing Flower and Fruit Mountain with Peking Opera performer Li Guang.

In 1991, by age 12, due to he could perform Peking Opera, Fei was invited by the director Sun Zhou to perform in The True-Hearted, which was nominated the Best Supporting Actor of the 12th China Golden Rooster Awards.

In 1993, Fei played a supporting role in the epic historical drama film Farewell My Concubine, starring Leslie Cheung, Gong Li and Zhang Fengyi and directed by Chen Kaige.

In 2010, Fei met director Guan Hu while participating in the television series Female Military Soul and officially became a apprentice of Guan Hu. Afterwards, he successively served as the B-group director of the comedy film The Chef, the Actor, the Scoundrel and the executive director of Mr. Six. That same year, he cast as Sun Wukong in Journey to the West, adapted from Wu Cheng'en's classical novel of the same title. He also had a small role in The Dream of Red Mansions, a television series adaptation based on the classical novel of the same name by Cao Xueqin.

In 2017, Guan Hu and Fei Zhenxiang purchased the copyright of the Ghost Blows Out the Light series and directed The Weasel Grave, Candle in the Tomb: the Wrath of Time, Candle in the Tomb: the Lost Caverns, and The Worm Valley.

In 2023, Fei had a cameo appearance in the science fiction television series Three-Body, based on the novel The Three-Body Problem by Liu Cixin.

== Filmography ==
=== As director ===
Year	English title	Chinese title	Ref.
2013	The Blood Charm	生死血符	Television
2013	Monthly Payment	月供	Television
2014	We are the Best Ten Years	我们最美好的十年	Television
2015	Mr. Six	老炮儿	Film
2016	Run for Love	奔爱	Film
2017	The Weasel Grave	鬼吹灯之黄皮子坟	Web serials
2018	Waiting Chime	外滩钟声	Television
2019	Candle in the Tomb: the Wrath of Time	鬼吹灯之怒晴湘西	Web serials
2019	Uncle and Youth	大叔与少年	Television
2019	Candle in the Tomb: the Lost Caverns	鬼吹灯之龙岭迷窟	Web serials
2019	Mystery of Antiques II	古董局中局之鉴墨寻瓷	Web serials
2020	The Worm Valley	鬼吹灯之云南虫谷	Web serials
2022	Love Like the Galaxy	星汉灿烂·月升沧海	Television
2023	In Spite of the Strong Wind	纵有疾风起	Television
2024	She and Her Girls	山花烂漫时	Television

=== As actor in film ===
Year	English title	Chinese title	Role	Ref.
1983	Yue Yun	岳云	Little Fairy Child	
1992	The True-Hearted	心香	Jing Jing	
1993	Farewell My Concubine	霸王别姬	Xiao Shitou	
2008	Forever Enthralled	梅兰芳		
2010	The Love of Three Smile	三笑之才子佳人	Official	
2012	Caught in the Web	搜索	Wedding host	
2013	The Chef, the Actor, the Scoundrel	厨子戏子痞子	Er Qiu	

=== As actor in television ===
Year	English title	Chinese title	Role	Ref.
2010	Journey to the West	西游记	Sun Wukong	
2010	The Dream of Red Mansions	红楼梦	Xing'er	
2010	Female Military Soul	女子军魂	Sun Wenxuan	
2011	Legenda 12 Bintang	十二生肖传奇	Lan Tong	
2012		春光灿烂之欢乐元帅	Sun Wukong	
2013	Three Brothers	火线三兄弟	Koizumi Keiji	
2023	Three-Body	三体	Messenger	

== Film and TV Awards ==
Year	Nominated work	Award	Category	Result	Ref.
1992	The True-Hearted	12th China Golden Rooster Awards	Best Supporting Actor	Nominated	
