= Index of Windows games (P) =

This is an index of Microsoft Windows games.

This list has been split into multiple pages. Please use the Table of Contents to browse it.

Title	Released	Developer	Publisher
P.A.M.E.L.A.	2020	NVYVE Studios	NVYVE Studios
Pac-Man World 2	2002	The Bitmap Brothers	Namco, Zoo Digital Publishing, Hip Games
Pac-Man World 3	2005	Blitz Games	Namco
Pac-Man World Rally	2006	Smart Bomb Interactive	Namco Bandai Games
Pac-Man: Adventures in Time	2000	Creative Asylum	Hasbro Interactive
Pacific Drive	2024	Ironwood Studios	Kepler Interactive
Pacific Fighters	2004	1C Company	Ubisoft
Pacific General	1997	Strategic Simulations, Inc	Strategic Simulations, Inc
Pacific Storm	2006	Lesta Studio	Buka Entertainment, CDV Software
Painkiller	2004	People Can Fly	DreamCatcher Interactive
Painkiller: Resurrection	2009	Homegrown Games	JoWood Productions
Pajama Sam: No Need to Hide When It's Dark Outside	1998	Humongous Entertainment	Atari
Pajama Sam 2: Thunder and Lightning Aren't so Frightening	1998	Humongous Entertainment	Atari
Pajama Sam 3: You Are What You Eat from Your Head to Your Feet	2001	Humongous Entertainment	GT Interactive
Pajama Sam 4: Life Is Rough When You Lose Your Stuff!	2003	Humongous Entertainment	Atari
Paleo Pines	2023	Italic Pig	Modus Games
Palworld	2026	Pocketpair	Pocketpair
The Pandora Directive	1996	Access Software	Access Software
Panty Raider: From Here to Immaturity	2000	Hypnotix	Simon & Schuster Interactive
Panzer Commander	1998	Ultimation Inc.	Strategic Simulations Inc.
Panzer Corps	2011	Lordz Games Studio, Flashback Games	Slitherine Software
Panzer Corps 2	2020	Flashback Games	Slitherine Software
Panzer Dragoon	1996	Team Andromeda	Sega
Panzer Elite	1999	Wings Simulations	Psygnosis, JoWooD Productions Software
Panzer Elite Action: Dunes of War	2007	ZootFly	JoWooD Productions
Panzer Elite Action: Fields of Glory	2006	ZootFly	JoWooD Productions
Panzer General	1996	Strategic Simulations, Inc	Strategic Simulations, Inc
Panzer General 3D Assault	1999	Strategic Simulations, Inc.	Strategic Simulations, Inc.
Panzer General II	1997	Strategic Simulations, Inc.	Strategic Simulations, Inc.
Panzer General III: Scorched Earth	2000	Mattel	Mattel
Panzer Paladin	2020	Tribute Games	Tribute Games
Paradise	2006	White Birds Productions	Micro Application
Paradise Cracked	2002	MiST Land South	Tri Synergy, Buka Entertainment
Paratopic	2018	Arbitrary Metric	Arbitrary Metric
ParaWorld	2006	SEK	Sunflowers
Paris 1313	1999	Dramaera	Canal+ Multimedia, RMN, Microids
Paris-Dakar Rally	2001	Acclaim Cheltenham	Acclaim
Parkitect	2018	Texel Raptor	Texel Raptor
Pascal's Wager	2021	TipsWorks	Giant Network, Yooreka Studio
Past Cure	2018	Phantom 8 Studio	Phantom 8 Studio
The Path	2009	Tale of Tales	Tale of Tales, 1C Company
Path of Exile	2013	Grinding Gear Games	Grinding Gear Games
Pathologic	2005	Ice-Pick Lodge	Buka Entertainment
Patriots: A Nation Under Fire	2007	4D Rulers	SilverLine Software
Patron	2021	Overseer Games	Overseer Games
Pawly Pets: My Animal Hospital	2007	BrainGame, Ubisoft	Ubisoft, Focus Multimedia
Pax Corpus	1997	Cryo Interactive	Cryo Interactive
Pax Imperia: Eminent Domain	1997	Heliotrope Studios	Atari, THQ
Payday 2	2013	Overkill Software	505 Games
Payday 3	2023	Starbreeze Studios	Deep Silver
Payday: The Heist	2011	Overkill Software	Sony Online Entertainment
PDC World Championship Darts	2006	Mere Mortals	Oxygen Interactive, Red Ant Enterprises
PDC World Championship Darts 2008	2008	Mere Mortals	Oxygen Interactive, Red Ant Enterprises
Peace@Pieces	2004	Unisonshift	Unisonshift
PeaceMaker	2007	ImpactGames	ImpactGames
Peggle	2007	PopCap Games	PopCap Games
Peggle Nights	2008	PopCap Games	PopCap Game
Pencil Whipped	2000	Chiselbrain Software	Chiselbrain Software
Penny Arcade Adventures: On the Rain-Slick Precipice of Darkness	2008	Hothead Games	Hothead Games
Penumbra: Black Plague	2008	Frictional Games	Paradox Interactive
Penumbra: Overture	2007	Frictional Games	Lexicon Entertainment
Penumbra: Requiem	2008	Frictional Games	Paradox Interactive
People's General	1998	Strategic Simulations, Inc.	Strategic Simulations, Inc.
Per Aspera	2020	Tlön Industries	Raw Fury
Perception	2017	The Deep End Games	The Deep End Games
Perfect Cherry Blossom	2003	Team Shanghai Alice	Team Shanghai Alice
Perfect Weapon	1997	Gray Matter Studios	ASC Games
Perfect World	2005	Beijing Perfect World	Beijing Perfect World, Perfect World Entertainment, Games-Masters Ltd.
Perimeter	2004	KD Lab	1C Company
Perimeter 2: New Earth	2009	KDV Games	Strategy First
Persona 5 Royal	2022	P-Studio	Sega
Perspective	2012	DigiPen's Institute of Technology	DigiPen's Institute of Technology
Pet Pals: Animal Doctor	2006	Legacy Interactive	Legacy Interactive
Petz: Dogz 2 and Catz 2	2007	ImaginEngine	Ubisoft
PGA Championship Golf 1999 Edition	1999	Headgate Studios	Sierra Sports
PGA Championship Golf 2000	2000	Headgate Studios	Sierra Sports
Phantasmagoria	1995	Sierra On-Line/Kronos Digital	Sierra On-Line
Phantasmagoria of Flower View	2005	Team Shanghai Alice	Team Shanghai Alice
Phantasmagoria: A Puzzle of Flesh	1996	Sierra Entertainment	Sierra Entertainment
Phantasy Star Universe	2006	Sonic Team	Sega
Phoenix Dynasty Online	2007	Object Software	Ingle Games Ltd
Pico Park	2016	TecoPark	TecoPark
Pico Park 2	2024	TecoPark	TecoPark
Pillars of Eternity	2015	Obsidian Entertainment	Paradox Interactive
Pillars of Eternity II: Deadfire	2018	Obsidian Entertainment	Versus Evil
Pillars of Garendall	2001	Beenox Studios	Ambrosia Software
Pine	2019	Twirlbound	Kongregate
Pipeline	2004	Superior Interactive	Superior Interactive
Pirate Hunter	2003	Ascaron	Encore, Inc
Pirates of Black Cove	2011	Nitro Games	Paradox Interactive
Pirates of the Burning Sea	2008	Flying Lab Software	Sony Online Entertainment, Akella, Gamearena
Pirates of the Caribbean	2003	Akella	Bethesda Softworks
Pirates of the Caribbean: At World's End	2007	Eurocom	Buena Vista Games
Pirates of the Caribbean: The Legend of Jack Sparrow	2006	7 Studios/Buena Vista Games	Bethesda Softworks/Ubisoft
Pitfall: The Lost Expedition	2004	Edge of Reality	Activision
Pitfall: The Mayan Adventure	1995	Activision, Redline Games	Activision
Pixel Piracy	2013	Quadro Delta	Quadro Delta
Pixelus	2004	PopCap Games	PopCap Games
Pizza Frenzy	2005	Sprout Games, PopCap Games	GameHouse, PopCap Games
Plague Inc: Evolved	2016	Ndemic Creations	Ndemic Creations
A Plague Tale: Innocence	2019	Asobo Studio	Focus Home Interactive
A Plague Tale: Requiem	2022	Asobo Studio	Focus Entertainment
Plane Crazy	1998	Inner Workings	SegaSoft
Planescape: Torment	1999	Black Isle Studios	Interplay Entertainment
PlaneShift	2002	Atomic Blue	
Planet Explorers	2016	Pathea Games	Pathea Games
Planet Nomads	2019	Craneballs Studio	Craneballs Studio
Planetbase	2015	Madruga Works	Madruga Works
PlanetSide Arena	2019	Daybreak Game Company	Daybreak Game Company
PlanetSide 2	2012	Rogue Planet Games	Daybreak Game Company
Plants vs. Zombies	2009	PopCap Games	PopCap Games
Plants vs. Zombies: Garden Warfare	2014	PopCap Games	Electronic Arts
Plants vs. Zombies: Garden Warfare 2	2016	PopCap Games	Electronic Arts
Plasma Pong	2007	Steve Taylor	
Please Fix the Road	2022	Arielek	Silesia Games
POD	1997	Ubi Soft	Ubi Soft
Poi	2017	PolyKid	PolyKid
Pokémon Project Studio	1999	Leisure Concepts	The Learning Company
Pokémon TCG Online	2012	Dire Wolf Digital	The Pokémon Company
Polar Bowler	2004	WildTangent	WildTangent
The Polar Express	2004	Blue Tongue Entertainment	THQ
Polar Golfer	2004	WildTangent	WildTangent
Police Quest: SWAT 2	1998	Yosemite Entertainment	Sierra Entertainment
The Political Machine	2004	Stardock	Ubisoft
The Political Machine 2008	2008	Stardock	Ubisoft
The Political Machine Express 2008	2008	Stardock	Ubisoft
The Political Machine 2012	2012	Stardock	Stardock
The Political Machine 2016	2016	Stardock	Stardock
The Political Machine 2020	2020	Stardock	Stardock
The Political Machine 2024	2024	Stardock	Stardock
Pollen	2016	Mindfield Games	Mindfield Games
Pompei: The Legend of Vesuvius	2000	Arxel Tribe	Cryo Interactive
Pool of Radiance: Ruins of Myth Drannor	2001	Stormfront Studios	Ubi Soft
Pools	2024	Tensori	UNIKAT label
Pool Paradise	2004	Awesome Developments	Ignition Entertainment
Pool Shark 2	2004	Blade Interactive	Zoo Digital Publishing
Poppy Playtime	2021	Mob Entertainment	Mob Entertainment
Populous: The Beginning	1998	Bullfrog Productions	Electronic Arts
Port Royale 2	2004	Ascaron Entertainment	Take-Two Interactive
Port Royale: Gold, Power and Pirates	2003	Ascaron Entertainment	Tri-Synergy
Portal	2007	Valve	Valve
Portal 2	2011	Valve	Valve
Portal Knights	2016	Keen Games	505 Games
Portugal 1111: A Conquista de Soure	2004	Ciberbit	Ciberbit
Postal	1997	Running with Scissors	Ripcord Games
Postal 2	2003	Running with Scissors	Whiptail Interactive
Postal 4: No Regerts	2022	Running with Scissors	Running with Scissors
Postal III	2011	Trashmasters, Running with Scissors	Akella
Potion Craft	2022	niceplay games	TinyBuild
Power Chess	1996	Sierra Entertainment	Sierra Entertainment
Power Rangers: Super Legends	2007	Artificial Mind and Movement	Disney Interactive Studios
Powerslide	1998	Ratbag Games	GT Interactive
PoxNora	2006	Sony Online Entertainment	Sony Online Entertainment
Praetorians	2003	Pyro Studios	Eidos Interactive
Praey for the Gods	2021	No Matter Studios	No Matter Studios
The Precursors	2009	Deep Shadows	Russobit-M
Prey	2006	Human Head Studios	2K Games
Prey	2017	Arkane Austin	Bethesda Softworks
Primal Prey	2001	Sunstorm Interactive	Sunstorm Interactive
The Prince and the Coward	1998	Metropolis Software House	IPS Computer Group
Prince of Persia	2008	Ubisoft Montreal	Ubisoft
Prince of Persia 3D	1999	Red Orb Entertainment	The Learning Company
Prince of Persia: The Sands of Time	2003	Ubisoft Montreal	Ubisoft, SCEJ
Prince of Persia: The Two Thrones	2005	Ubisoft Montreal	Ubisoft
Prince of Persia: Warrior Within	2004	Ubisoft Montreal, Pipeworks Software	Ubisoft
Princess Holiday	2002	August	August
Prism: Light the Way	2007	Morpheme Game Studios	Eidos Interactive
Prison Tycoon	2005	Virtual Playground	ValuSoft
Prisoner	2002	Wide Games	Codemasters
Prisoner of Ice	1998	Chaosium	Infogrames Europe SA
Prisoners of the Sun	1997	Infogrames	Infogrames
Pro Cycling Manager	2005	Cyanide	Focus
Pro Evolution Soccer 3	2003	Konami	Konam
Pro Evolution Soccer 4	2004	Konami	Konami
Pro Evolution Soccer 5	2005	Konami	Konami
Pro Evolution Soccer 6	2006	Konami	Konami
Pro Evolution Soccer 2008	2007	Konami	Konami
Pro Evolution Soccer 2009	2008	Konami Computer Entertainment Tokyo	Konami
Pro Evolution Soccer 2010	2009	Konami Computer Entertainment Tokyo	Konami
Pro Evolution Soccer 2011	2010	Konami Computer Entertainment Tokyo	Konami
Pro Evolution Soccer 2012	2011	Konami Computer Entertainment Tokyo	Konami
Pro Evolution Soccer 2013	2012	Konami Computer Entertainment Tokyo	Konami
Pro Evolution Soccer 2014	2013	Konami	Konami
Pro Evolution Soccer 2015	2014	PES Productions	Konami
Pro Evolution Soccer 2016	2015	Konami Computer Entertainment Tokyo	Konami
Pro Evolution Soccer 2017	2016	Konami Computer Entertainment Tokyo	Konami
Pro Evolution Soccer 2018	2017	PES Productions	Konami
Pro Pinball: Big Race USA	1998	Cunning Development	Empire Interactive
Pro Pinball: The Web	1996	Cunning Development	Empire Interactive
Pro Pinball: Timeshock!	1997	Cunning Development	Empire Interactive
Prodeus	2022	Bounding Box Software	Humble Games
Prodigy Tactics	2018	Hanakai Studio	Forever Entertainment, PlayWay, Ultimate Games
Progress Quest	2002	Eric Fredricksen	Eric Fredricksen
Project CARS	2015	Slightly Mad Studios	Bandai Namco Entertainment
Project CARS 2	2017	Slightly Mad Studios	Bandai Namco Entertainment
Project CARS 3	2020	Slightly Mad Studios	Bandai Namco Entertainment
Project Highrise	2016	SomaSim	Kasedo Games
Project I.G.I.	2000	Innerloop Studios	Eidos Interactive
Project Nomads	2002	Radon Labs	CDV Software
Project Reality	2005	The Project Reality Team	The Project Reality Team
Project Snowblind	2005	Crystal Dynamics	Eidos Interactive
Project Torque	2008	Invictus Games	Aeria Games & Entertainment
Project Wingman	2020	Sector D2	Humble Games
Protöthea	2005	Digital Builders	Ubisoft
Prototype	2009	Radical Entertainment	Activision
Prototype 2	2012	Radical Entertainment	Activision
Pseudoregalia	2023	rittzler	rittzler
Psi-Ops: The Mindgate Conspiracy	2004	Midway Games	Midway Games
Psychonauts	2005	Double Fine Productions	Majesco
Psychotoxic	2004	NuClearVision Entertainment	Vidis, Whiptail Interactive
PUBG: Battlegrounds	2017	PUBG Corporation	PUBG Corporation
PULSAR: Lost Colony	2021	Leafy Games	Leafy Games
The Punisher	2004	Volition	THQ
Puppet Guardian	2007	Cold Breath, Co., Ltd.	Artifact, Co., Ltd., Policros, LLC
Puppet Master: The Game	2023	October Games	Full Moon Features, October Games
Puppy Luv	2007	Lost Sock Games	Lost Sock Games
Pure	2008	Black Rock Studio	Disney Interactive Studios
PureSim Baseball 2007	2006	PureSim Software Studios	Matrix Games
Putt-Putt Enters the Race	1998	Humongous Entertainment	Atari
Putt-Putt Goes to the Moon	1995	Humongous Entertainment	Humongous Entertainment
Putt-Putt Joins the Circus	2000	Humongous Entertainment	Atari
Putt-Putt Joins the Parade	1995	Humongous Entertainment	Humongous Entertainment
Putt-Putt Saves the Zoo	1996	Humongous Entertainment	Humongous Entertainment
Putt-Putt Travels Through Time	1997	Humongous Entertainment	Atari
Puyo Pop Fever	2004	Sonic Team	Sega, Atlus, THQ, Ignition Entertainment
Puyo Puyo Tetris	2018	Sonic Team	Sega
Puzzle Bobble	1995	Taito	Taito
Puzzle Bobble 2	1996	Taito/Probe Entertainment	Taito
Puzzle Bobble 3	1996	Taito	Taito
Puzzle Bobble 4	1997	Cyber Front	Taito
Puzzle Kingdoms	2009	Infinite Interactive	Zoo Games, Zushi Games
Puzzle Quest: Challenge of the Warlords	2007	Infinite Interactive	D3 Publisher
Puzzle Quest: Galactrix	2009	Infinite Interactive	D3 Publisher
Puzzlegeddon	2008	Pieces Interactive	Pieces Interactive
Pyst	1996	Peter Bergman	Parroty Interactive
