= List of WildTangent games =

This is a list of video games published or developed by WildTangent, from Dell Games.

== Current ==
This list is taken from WildTangent's official website.

- Blackhawk Striker 2
- Blasterball 2: Holidays
- Blasterball 2: Remix
- Blasterball 2: Revolution
- Blasterball 3
- Crystal Maze (2003)
- Fate (2005)
- Fate: Undiscovered Realms
- Fate: The Traitor Soul
- Fate: The Cursed King
- Final Drive: Fury
- Final Drive: Nitro (2004)
- John Deere Drive Green
- Otto's Magic Blocks
- Penguins! (2007)
- Phoenix Assault
- Polar Bowler (2004)
- Polar Golfer (2006)
- Polar Golfer: Pineapple Cup (2005)
- Polar Pool
- Polar Tubing
- Run 'n Gun Football
- Sea Life Safari (2008)
- Snowboard SuperJam

=== From AWS ===
- Tornado Jockey

=== From DreamWorks ===
- Shrek 2: Ogre Bowler

=== From Escape Factory ===
- Bounce Symphony
- Overball
- Word Symphony

=== From Sandlot Games ===
- Slyder (2002)
- Slyder Adventures
- Super Granny (2004)
- Super Slyder
- Tradewinds
- Cake Mania

=== From Popcap Games ===
- Plants vs. Zombies

== Former ==
- Battleship
- Betty Bad
- Blackhawk Striker
- Blasterball Wild
- Cannonballs!
- Dark Orbit
- Fill Up
- Five Card Frenzy
- Game of Life
- Glow Glow Firefly
- Groove-o-Matic
- Invasion
- Jewel Thief
- LEGO Builder Bots
- Lexibox Deluxe
- Men in Black II: Crossfire
- Monopoly
- Monster Park Madness
- Orbital
- Run 'N Gun Football
- SabreWing 2
- Shooting Stars Pool
- Snowboard Extreme
- STX
- Yahtzee
