= Maelstrom: The Battle for Earth Begins =

2007 video game

- Developer: KD Vision
- Publisher: Codemasters
- Director: Evgeny Novikov
- Producer: Elena Khudenko
- Designer: Julia Novikova
- Programmers: Alexander Kotliar; Evgeny Khudenko
- Artists: Vladislav Spitski; Alexey Vetlugin
- Composer: James McWilliams
- Engine: Vista Game Engine
- Platform: Windows
- Release: EU: February 9, 2007; NA: February 20, 2007
- Genres: Real-time strategy, third-person shooter
- Modes: Single player, multiplayer

Maelstrom: The Battle for Earth Begins (Russian: Maelstrom: Битва за землю началась) is a real-time strategy game developed by KD-Vision in Russia and published by Codemasters.

== Plot ==
Maelstrom: The Battle for Earth Begins is set in 2050 in a post-apocalyptic future following an ecological disaster which results in much of the planet's submersion, as well as the subsequent nuclear holocaust over the remaining resources. Most of humankind has taken refuge beneath the surface, taking shelter from a long-standing war between the guerilla-warfare Remnants, and the hi-tech Ascension. In the midst of this war, an alien race facing extinction, known as the Hai-Genti appear, quickly flooding the land and slaughtering Remnants and Ascension alike.

The game utilises a lot of the technology used in KD's previous RTS game, Perimeter. Features such as terraforming and weather control are so far unique in the genre, and are said to be core to the gameplay. In Maelstrom: The Battle for Earth Begins, the player can also control the hero units directly, in third person perspective.

== Gameplay ==
Maelstrom: The Battle for Earth Begins gameplay requires players to construct bases while harvesting resources in order to fund production of various units as well as construction of other structures in order to aid the player's efforts to defeat the enemy. Resources are not uniform between factions and are referred to by different names, but are functionally identical. The three main resources are obtained from Survivor compounds, water pumps and the Sun.

Each resource is utilized in different ways, for example, water can be used to give units a speed boost in battle, as well as act as a healing base for Hai-Genti units, and as a staple requirement for researching upgrades. Resources can also be harvested on the battlefields, but in different ways. Biomass is useless to Ascension and Remnant forces, and salvage is only useful for the remnants.

Players can also command and group several units issuing orders from a bird's eye view, or commanding them by means of direct control. Players can take control of a faction's hero unit, and play the game from a third-person perspective, giving a significant advantage in range and sight, as well as the ability to launch a pre-emptive strike.

Terraforming plays a significant role in gameplay as well. Remnants and Ascension units can terraform the land to suit their needs, creating artificial hills and ditches, either barring units from entering or exiting and can also be used in staging a defensive stronghold. The Hai-Genti cannot terraform, but instead flood the map by means of Mutagen pumps, giving them an advantage in early game against vehicles.

== Factions ==
=== The Remnants ===
The Remnants are a guerilla-warfare based group led by James Buchanan, consisting of army recruits and war veterans from across the world, essentially forming the last formidable army anywhere in the world. Remnants have a wide variety of units to compensate for low damage and low-tech gear. These units are much more mobile but can only take small amounts of damage before wearing out. Remnants utilize Salvage, Solar power and Fresh Water.

The Remnants utilize conventional weapons and stealth tactics in order to wear down the enemies. Remnant units are specialised, focusing on one particular form of combat rather than a general purpose unit. Remnant bases are constructed on Survivor Compounds. These Havens provide an infinite source of Salvage, and act as a construction site for the middle man Scavenger, and barracks for all Remnant infantry. Salvage can be harvested from the remains of vehicles as well as from survivor compounds by use of Havens.

Vehicles and Scavengers will take damage from being submerged in water unless amphibious upgrades are researched.

=== The Ascension ===
The Ascension are the hi-tech remains of a corporation headed by Arlan Khan, who suffers from a messianic complex, and proceeds to command troops in a totalitarian manner, showing little concern for the dead. The Ascension focuses more on powerful all-purpose units, but are somewhat inflexible in terms of base expansion. The Ascension harvests DNA, Solar power and Hydrogen.

The Ascension utilize hi-tech laser weaponry, advanced technology and raw firepower in place of unit diversity. Ascension bases can be constructed anywhere on the battlefield by means of a Vanguard unit. All Ascension buildings are constructed from a Vanguard which can deconstruct and relocate if the need arises. Unlike the Remnants however, DNA is harvested from Survivor compounds by means of a Manipulator, a unit which can perform terraforming like the scavenger, but cannot construct anything. Hydrogen is harvested from water pumps, and is used for the same purpose as the water resources. Solar energy is generated automatically from Ascension buildings, which act as solar generators.

Ascension units and buildings are capable of regenerating shields but lack any regenerative capacity whatsoever. The Ascension compensate for the lack of units by including vehicles which can morph into other forms to suit the battle. For example, ground units which are effective against infantry can transform into aerial anti-vehicle units, or can become stationary turrets or long-range artillery.

Much like the Remnants, vehicles and Manipulators will take damage from submersion unless the vehicles can hover over the water.

=== The Hai-Genti ===
The Hai-Genti are aliens who come to Earth in the middle of the struggle between the Ascension and Remnants. They use no mechanical units, and are a race of bio-constructs, each engineered for a specific purpose. The invasion is led by Mammon, and is overseen by a being known as the Overseer. The Hai-Genti are all biological, and as such have no vehicles or transport systems. Bases consist of only three buildings, an Inception Spore, a Biomass farm, and a Mutagen Pump. The Hai-Genti have no shields, and can regenerate in water. The Hai-Genti harvest only two resources, namely Biomass and Mutagen.

Unlike the other two factions, the Hai-Genti do not have multiple base structures, nor are there separate facilities for constructing infantry and vehicles. All units are spawned from eggs, which are called down by Inception Spores, which also act as the primary research centre. These eggs can then hatch into any one of a variety of units, depending on its size.

Biomass is harvested by constructing biomass farms on top of survivor compounds, which can also create Bio-thralls; units which can be sacrificed inside an egg, resulting in a stronger hatched creature. Biomass can also be harvested from enemy and friendly corpses.

Mutagen acts as the equivalent to the water resource, and also behaves as a healing agent in any water into which it is pumped. Unlike other factions, Mutagen pumps when constructed over water stations, flood the land, while healing any aliens swimming in its waters.

The Inception Spore can be evolved/upgraded, allowing for more eggs, which improve in size and Thrall capacity, as well as providing access to more upgrades. The inception spore at last evolved stage (called the elder spore) can call down an extremely powerful melee unit called the titan, however this costs a lot of water and biomass.

== Enhanced Version ==
Maelstrom: The Battle for Earth Begins Enhanced was released for Windows on February 6, 2026.

== See also ==
- Perimeter (video game)
- Perimeter 2: New Earth
- Vangers
