= Silverball Studios =

British video game developer

Silverball Studios Limited
- Formerly: Fuse Games Limited (2002–2009)
- Type: Subsidiary
- Industry: Interactive entertainment
- Founded: 2002
- Founder: Adrian Barritt; Richard Horrocks
- Defunct: 2012
- Fate: Merged into Barnstorm Games
- Headquarters: Burford, Oxfordshire, England
- Website: silverballstudios.com

Silverball Studios Limited, formerly known as Fuse Games Limited, was a British video game developer known for developing pinball games. It served as a second-party developer for Nintendo for much of its existence.

== History ==
=== Fuse Games Limited era ===
The company was founded in 2002 by Adrian Barritt and Richard Horrocks, makers of the award-winning Pro Pinball series of computer games. As an idea to show what they were capable of, they developed a Mario pinball demo and pitched the idea to Nintendo, who then hired the company to make Mario Pinball Land for the Game Boy Advance. The whole game was made by just five people. Later, Fuse Games developed Nintendo DS games, the most notable being Metroid Prime Pinball, a pinball adaptation of the GameCube game Metroid Prime. The studio also became the only developer outside Japan to create a Touch! Generations game, with Active Health with Carol Vorderman.

=== Silverball Studios Limited era ===
In 2009, the company nearly went bankrupt after completing Pinball Pulse: The Ancients Beckon for DSiWare, but reformed as Silverball Studios. The company attempted to revive the Pro Pinball series through Kickstarter in 2012. The project's goal was unsuccessful, and the company eventually merged into Barnstorm Games as the in-house development team. Afterwards, the Kickstarter was revived in 2013, but was limited to the single table Timeshock!. This campaign reached its goal and the Ultra Edition of Pro-Pinball: Timeshock! was released for several platforms.

== Games ==
=== Game Boy Advance ===
- Mario Pinball Land (2004)

=== Nintendo DS ===
- Metroid Prime Pinball (2005)
- Active Health with Carol Vorderman (2009)
- Pinball Pulse: The Ancients Beckon (2009)
- Thomas & Friends: Hero of the Rails (2010)

=== Wii ===
- Thomas & Friends: Hero of the Rails (2010)
- American Mensa Academy (2012)

=== iPhone ===
- Mensa Brain Test (2010)
- Frogger Pinball (2011)

=== Nintendo 3DS ===
- BearShark: The Game (2013)

=== Windows/Xbox 360 Arcade ===
- American Mensa Academy (2012)
- Pro Pinball: Timeshock! - The Ultra Edition (2014)
