= Pinball Pulse: The Ancients Beckon =

2009 video game

- Developer: Fuse Games
- Publisher: Nintendo
- Platform: Nintendo DSi
- Release: NA: 12 October 2009; PAL: 5 March 2010
- Genre: Pinball
- Mode: Single-player

Pinball Pulse: The Ancients Beckon is a pinball video game developed by Fuse Games and published by Nintendo for the Nintendo DSi's DSiWare service. It was released in North America on 12 October 2009 and PAL territories on 5 March 2010. It was the first game to be developed by Fuse Games for Nintendo that was not based on their intellectual properties and the last to be released prior to their closure the same year. Due to rights issues, it was unavailable for download on the Nintendo 3DS eShop until 2012.

== Gameplay ==
Pinball Pulse: The Ancients Beckon is a pinball game that features a single pinball machine themed after Greek mythology. Players control the machine's flippers to shoot the pinball onto numerous areas themed after individual Greek deities. Players can gain extra points from "gifts" from the deities as well as entering areas to "battle" against enemies such as Medusa and the Sirens. It is closer in style to an actual pinball machine than Fuse Games' previous releases Mario Pinball Land and Metroid Prime Pinball, simulating its physics in a realistic manner. A "Daily Game" mode is available which registers the score attained with only one ball.

== Reception ==
Craig Harris of IGN gave the game a 7.9/10 score, praising the game for its realistic physics and production value while noting its potential as a franchise. Corbie Dillard of Nintendo Life gave the game a 7/10 score, praising its authentic physics and gameplay while criticizing its lack of variety.

== See also ==
- Mario Pinball Land
- Metroid Prime Pinball
