= Secret Service 2 =

2003 video game

Secret Service 2: Security Breach
- Developer(s): 4D Rulers
- Publisher(s): Activision Value
- Engine: AMP II Game Engine
- Platform(s): Microsoft Windows
- Release: 2003
- Genre(s): First-person shooter
- Mode(s): Single-player

Secret Service 2: Security Breach is a computer game created by 4D Rulers and published by Activision Value. It puts the player in the position of a member of the secret service whose purpose is to defend the President. It is a sequel to Secret Service (2001).

== Story ==
The security of the President and the nation rests squarely on the player's shoulders. As a new recruit on the rise, they will be faced with many life-threatening situations. Relying on their instincts and training, they must detect threats and stop terrorist actions before they can become a reality. It's their responsibility to deal with the "bad guys", protect the good guys and the overall well-being of their country.

== Features ==
- Escorting of officials through hostile environments
- Large arsenal, including dozens of tactical weapons from handguns to rocket launchers
- Graphics system with real-time lighting, particle effects, bump mapping, spectacular lighting, stencil shadowing and highly detailed environments
- Environments feature destructible objects, exploding barrels and other objects
- Locational damage system
- Encounter many types of criminals from low-level mob enforcers to highly dangerous terrorists
