= Pro Pinball: The Web =

1996 video game

- Developer: Cunning Developments
- Publishers: EU: Empire Interactive; NA: Interplay Productions
- Series: Pro Pinball
- Platforms: PlayStation, MS-DOS, Windows 9x, Sega Saturn, Macintosh (Mac OS 9 or earlier)
- Release: PlayStation: EU: July 1996; NA: 30 September 1996; PC: NA: 25 October 1996; Sega Saturn: EU: August 1996; NA: 31 October 1996
- Genre: Action
- Modes: Single-player, multiplayer

Pro Pinball: The Web (Pro Pinball in North America) is a pinball simulation video game developed by Cunning Developments for PlayStation, MS-DOS, Windows 95 and Sega Saturn. It is the first game in the Pro Pinball series.

== Background ==
Pro Pinball: The Web uses graphics pre-rendered from an intricate 3D model. Consequently, the game had superior graphical capabilities to other popular pinball games of the time, while playing at full speed on MS-DOS. The Web supports screen resolutions up to 1024x768 with 32,768 colours at 60 frames per second, and features Red Book CD-DA audio tracks, and sampled mechanical sounds. The developer had initially tried to obtain the license for Star Trek: The Next Generation, but were unable to do so. The preliminary demo was reworked for this game, mirroring the layout. Elements from Rollergames and Black Knight 2000 were also incorporated.

== Gameplay ==
Pro Pinball: The Web was the first of the Pro Pinball series of realistic computer pinball simulations.

Pro Pinball: The Web is a pinball simulation in which players operate a virtual pinball table. Players can score extra points by making combos, i.e. performing a move twice in a row. Hitting targets at the far end of the table activates the game's missions, in which the player must hit lighted ramps or bumpers to score bonus points. Completing a mission results in a huge point bonus.

== Reception ==
Reception

Review scores
Publication	Score
AllGame	4.5/5 (SAT); 3/5 (PS1)
Electronic Gaming Monthly	5.125/10 (PS1)
GameSpot	5/10 (PS1); 7.4/10 (PC)
Next Generation	3/5 (PS1)
PinGame Journal	8/10 (PC)
Sega Saturn Magazine	70% (SAT)

The PlayStation and Saturn versions received mixed reviews. While critics praised the realistic pinball graphics and physics and the wide variety of scoring opportunities, they criticized the voice samples and the absence of a directly overhead view. Some also concluded that with only one table, the game would get old very quickly, though Next Generation remarked, "While many developers have tried to wow gamers with multiple tables, Empire went the other way - giving the player one table, but doing it right." Jeff Gerstmann of GameSpot concluded that it "is a convincing simulation of pinball, but it falls short when compared to other video pinball games." Rob Allsetter of Sega Saturn Magazine assessed that "All in all, this is a decent enough interpretation of the game itself, let down only by the exclusion of different table to variate the action a little", and Dan Hsu of Electronic Gaming Monthly said, "It's a great board, but it'll get old real quick."

Reviewing the PC version, Tim Soete highly praised the game's realism and summarized that "its high-resolution graphics and true table physics combine to make it one of the most immersive pinball titles out there." Although the game is compatible with Windows 95, it was found by PinGame Journal to run with less jerkiness under MS-DOS. The ball behaved realistically, and the multiple layers of game play were praised with both short and long shots at numerous targets.

The Web was named the 64th best computer game ever by PC Gamer UK in 1997. The editors wrote, "Nothing else has quite come close [...] to Pro Pinball's utterly convincing physics and slick presentation."
