= Ultramercial =

Ultramercial, LLC is an ad-delivery technology company founded in 2000 in California by Dana Jones. Its business model is hosting interactive advertisements that exchange user engagement for access to premium content, such as video, games, and public internet access. The company claimed that its system was effective, with a 4.84% average click-through rate in 2008 (in comparison to traditional advertisements).

== History ==
The company was founded in California in 2000 by former KROQ DJ and fashion photographer Dana Jones, its CEO. The company's main office is in Malaga Cove Plaza in Rancho Palos Verdes. Its first customer was Salon.com.

== Patent lawsuit ==
The company filed a patent infringement lawsuit against Hulu, YouTube and WildTangent in November 2014; in the lawsuit, Ultramercial accused the two companies of infringing its patent US 7346545 ("the '545 Patent," filed in 2001), covering the business model surrounding a "Method and system for payment of intellectual property royalties by interposed sponsor on behalf of consumer over a telecommunications network". In other words, the '545 Patent was directed to modeling the value of certain programming based on the number of advertisements consumers would continue to watch, a more direct valuation of consumers' time that previous models based directly on dollars spent in advertisement campaigns. While WildTangent challenged the validity of the patent in 2011 because they felt it was too abstract, the Court of Appeals for the Federal Circuit upheld Ultramercial's patent, stating that it "does not simply claim the age-old idea that advertising can serve as currency. Instead [it] discloses a practical application of this idea." The court also asserted that the technical elements required to implement the system described were intricate enough to not be abstract.

In 2012, the Supreme Court ordered the Federal Circuit to re-examine the case in the wake of several recent patent rulings on "abstract" concepts. This ruling came in the wake of the Supreme Court's ruling on patentable subject matter in Mayo Collaborative Services v. Prometheus Laboratories, Inc. This opinion was also issued shortly after the America Invents Act ("AIA") went into effect, drastically changing the statutory landscape of US Patent Law. On June 21, 2013, the Federal Circuit upheld its decision and ruled that Ultramercial's patents validly claimed methods of using advertising as a medium of exchange.

On November 14, 2014, the Federal Circuit reversed its prior rulings and found that the "patent does not claim patent eligible subject matter and accordingly affirm the district court’s grant of WildTangent’s motion to dismiss." This reversal came in the wake of the U.S. Supreme Court's ruling in Alice Corp. v. CLS Bank International, a benchmark case for doctrine-disruptive precedent defining patent eligible subject matter.
