= Metroid Prime Pinball =

2005 video game

- North American box art
- Developer: Fuse Games
- Publisher: Nintendo
- Producer: Kensuke Tanabe
- Composers: Kenji Yamamoto; Masaru Tajima
- Series: Metroid
- Platform: Nintendo DS
- Release: NA: October 24, 2005; AU: December 1, 2005; JP: January 19, 2006; EU: June 22, 2007
- Genre: Pinball
- Modes: Single-player, multiplayer

Metroid Prime Pinball is a pinball video game developed by Fuse Games and published by Nintendo for the Nintendo DS. It is a spin-off of the Metroid series, using the graphical style and various story elements from Metroid Prime. It was released in North America and Australia in 2005, in Japan in 2006, and in Europe in 2007. Metroid Prime Pinball uses the basic mechanics of pinball, along with typical pinball items. New mechanics are introduced, such as wall jumping and the ability to fire weapons. The Nintendo DS's touchscreen can be nudged with a finger to alter the pinball's trajectory while in motion.

The initial idea for a video game that presented the Metroid series in a pinball setting came to Kensuke Tanabe after he learned that Fuse Games had previously worked on Mario Pinball Land, another pinball video game. Recalling that the series' protagonist, Samus Aran, can morph into a ball, Tanabe was convinced that the Metroid universe could be adapted to a pinball setting. The game was sold with a Rumble Pak accessory for the Nintendo DS, marking the first time the accessory was available for the Nintendo DS.

Metroid Prime Pinball received generally positive reviews. Critics praised the game's transposition of the Metroid series into a pinball video game, but criticized its lack of variety. Metroid Prime Pinball sold 6,228 copies during its debut month of October 2005 in the United States, and over 15,000 units in Japan as of May 2008.

== Gameplay ==
The Tallon Overworld table is one of the first two tables that the player can access. In the lower screen, the score is seen at the top while the flippers are seen at the bottom.

Metroid Prime Pinball uses the basic mechanics of pinball, complete with an assortment of typical pinball items including flippers, spinners, bumpers, and ramps. In addition, new mechanics are introduced, such as enemies that wander around the table, wall jumping, and the ability to fire weapons. The Nintendo DS's touchscreen can be used to nudge the pinball table and alter the ball's trajectory. The game consists of six pinball tables, each inspired by a different area of Metroid Prime. Each table is shown across both screens of the Nintendo DS. Only two tables are initially available for play: Pirate Frigate and Tallon Overworld. After playing either of the first two tables, the player unlocks two more tables: Phendrana Drifts and Phazon Mines. In either table, the player must battle a boss to complete it.

During the course of the game, the player must acquire twelve Artifacts, which are prizes that are awarded after completing objectives such as winning minigames or beating bosses. Once having acquired twelve Artifacts, the player is granted access to a table called the Artifact Temple, which places six balls on the table at the same time. To complete the table, twelve different targets must be hit with the balls while they are bombarded by attacks from Meta Ridley, one of the antagonists of the Metroid Prime series. If all of the balls are lost, the table ends; the player does not lose any of the twelve Artifacts already collected but is forced to revisit another table and complete it before being allowed a second attempt at the Artifact Temple. Upon completing the Artifact Temple, access is granted to the final table, Impact Crater. After the player defeats the Metroid Prime creature on the Impact Crater table, the game unlocks a higher difficulty level, Expert mode.

The game also features a "Single Mission" mode which confines players to a single board. The Pirate Frigate and Tallon Overworld boards challenge players to earn a high point score, as in real pinball; on the other tables players are ranked by the time taken to complete a mission. In addition to the single-player mode, the game features a multiplayer mode, which requires only one copy of the game and allows up to eight players to compete in a race to reach a target score. The mode uses a seventh table, Magmoor Caverns, that does not appear in the single-player mode.

== Development ==
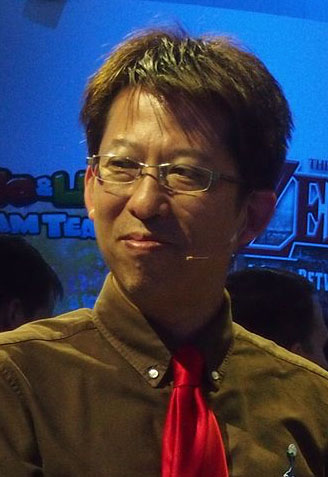
Kensuke Tanabe, seen here at E3 2013, was the producer for Metroid Prime Pinball. He also produced all three titles in the Metroid Prime series.

While making Metroid Prime Hunters, a Metroid first-person shooter video game for the Nintendo DS, Nintendo producer Kensuke Tanabe came up with the idea to make a pinball game based on the Metroid series as Fuse Games finished Mario Pinball Land, another pinball simulator based on a Nintendo property. Tanabe felt like the Metroid universe fit into such a setting due to series protagonist Samus Aran being able to morph into a ball, and Fuse agreed that the license was "a great fit for pinball", accepting to work on the game. Fuse Games then received some assets from Metroid Prime developers Retro Studios, and collaborated with the Hunters team at Nintendo Software Technology to elaborate on specific aspects of Metroid Prime Pinball, such as Samus's wall climbing and shooting abilities. Head of development Adrian Barritt said that in Metroid Prime Pinball the team tried to fix criticisms raised about the difficulty of Mario Pinball Land, creating a "more beginner friendly" game.

Named Project Code: Metroid Pinball while in development, the first gameplay footage from the game was released in May 2005, at the E3 convention. Nintendo of America revealed in August that the game, by then titled Metroid Prime Pinball, would be sold with the Rumble Pak accessory, which can be plugged into the Game Boy Advance slot of the Nintendo DS. When the Rumble Pak is installed, the Nintendo DS shakes whenever the pinball in the game hits an object. This was the first time that the Nintendo DS version of the Rumble Pak was introduced. It was first sold exclusively with Metroid Prime Pinball before becoming available as a standalone product from Nintendo.

Nintendo DS games that use the device's top and bottom screens as one continuous screen are harder to control because of a gap in the middle, sometimes called a visual "dead zone"; objects in this area are not visible. The developers of Metroid Prime Pinball, a game which takes advantage of both screens, resolved this problem by placing a second set of pinball flippers at the bottom of the upper screen to give players a reference to work with. The tabletops in the game use pre-rendered artwork for graphical effects, including Samus's Morph Ball, which uses renderings of images at several different angles to provide a smooth animation. To simulate the appearance of a real pinball game from a player's point of view, the tabletop in Metroid Prime Pinball was tipped back. The game offers players the ability to nudge the table, a technique used in pinball games to influence the ball's movement. This is achieved by touching the Nintendo DS's bottom touchscreen with a finger and pushing it in the direction that the player wants to nudge the tabletop. The game's soundtrack was composed by Kenji Yamamoto and Masaru Tajima, with audio effects from the Metroid Prime series are borrowed by the game to provide a "CD-like" music experience. The voice of the Power Suit was provided by Lorelei King.

== Reception ==
Reception

Aggregate score
Aggregator	Score
Metacritic	79/100 (51 reviews)

Review scores
Publication	Score
1Up.com	A−
Electronic Gaming Monthly	7.5/10
Eurogamer	4/10
Famitsu	9/10, 8/10, 8/10, 8/10
Game Informer	8/10
GamePro	3.5/5
GameRevolution	B−
GamesMaster	74/100
GameSpot	8.2/10
GameSpy	4/5
GameZone	8.5/10
IGN	8/10
Nintendo Power	9.5/10
Nintendo World Report	8.5/10
Official Nintendo Magazine	80/100
Play	9/10
X-Play	4/5

Metroid Prime Pinball was released by Nintendo for the Nintendo DS in North America on October 24, 2005, in Australia on December 1, in Japan on January 19, 2006, and in Europe on June 22, 2007. 6,228 copies were sold during its debut month of October 2005 in the United States, and over 15,000 units were sold in Japan as of May 2008.

It was given "generally favorable reviews", according to the review aggregator website Metacritic. Despite early skepticism over the quality of a pinball video game themed after the Metroid series, reviews praised the integration of the two in Metroid Prime Pinball. Nintendo Power called the game a "fully realized and well-tuned hybrid of pinball play and Metroid Prime atmosphere", and the Official Nintendo Magazine named it one of the better recently released pinball games. GameZone believed that the game appeals to anyone who is a fan of pinball games or the Metroid Prime franchise, to which Play magazine attested, adding that the game embodies the Metroid Prime series well.

Appreciating the game's pinball gameplay, 1UP.com thought that its Metroid motif did not add much more to the game. Nintendo World Report felt differently; they were impressed with the game's "top-notch graphics and sound that believably invoke the Metroid series". They also appreciated the pinball innovations introduced in the game that incorporate features from the series and called it a seamless merging between classic arcade pinball and Metroid Prime series. The sentiment was shared by GameSpot's Greg Kasavin, who was convinced that pinball was an excellent medium to simulate the challenging struggles found in the Metroid series, noting that the game "pulls it off very well" by being faithful to the main series. Bryn Williams of GameSpy was impressed after playing the game; he noted that it was one of the more interesting gaming sessions that anyone can have on the Nintendo DS. Metroid Prime Pinball's gameplay was lauded by reviewers. Craig Harris of IGN appreciated Fuse Games' work on the game, praising the graphics, audio, and gameplay, along with its "pick-up-and-play" element that made it easy for people with varying levels of skill to play. X-Play felt the same way, noting that the simple controls and "short bursts of gameplay" make Metroid Prime Pinball a perfect handheld video game. In addition, they asserted that the game has great value because of the included wireless multiplayer mode, which allows up to eight players to play the game with just one game card.

A few critics were negative about Metroid Prime Pinball. The reviewer from the Electronic Gaming Monthly video game magazine found it hard to see the pinball while playing the game, especially when it was in the area between the top and bottom Nintendo DS screens. With a limited selection of game modes, GamePro's Rice Burner was disappointed with the game, and concluded that because every game mode features the same tabletops, Metroid Prime Pinball lacked variety, which Game Informer's reviewer agreed with, noting that he would have had more fun with the game if he "had access to a little more content". The minigames were criticized by GameRevolution, which claimed that there were too many minigames that were only of average quality. Furthermore, it asked the game's developer, Fuse Games, to spend more time making a great pinball game rather than several minor minigames, requesting "a character-based game that's great at pinball rather than a fence-riding jack of all trades that is master of none". Eurogamer had a different experience, finding that the minigames provided more entertainment than the main game, which they remarked was a "cardinal sin in pinball". They also criticized the tilt feature for being unintuitive and difficult to use. The reviewer for GamesMaster felt that Metroid Prime Pinball was directed more towards Metroid fans than pinball aficionados, calling it a "flashy but insipid" game.

== See also ==
- Mario Pinball Land
- Pinball Pulse: The Ancients Beckon
