= Patriots: A Nation Under Fire =

2007 video game

- Developer: 4D Rulers
- Publisher: THQ Nordic GmbH (Digital) SilverLine Software (Retail)
- Engine: AMP 1.5
- Platform: Microsoft Windows
- Release: NA: January 23, 2007; EU: November 2, 2006; Digital; March 4, 2009
- Genre: First-person shooter
- Mode: Single player

Patriots: A Nation Under Fire is a computer game created by American studio 4D Rulers and published by SilverLine Software. The game was released for Microsoft Windows. It posits the player in the position of a United States Army National Guard soldier whose purpose is to defend the United States of America from a terrorist invasion. Terrorists have invaded US soil in an attempt to seize nuclear weapons and research facilities. On March 4, 2009, THQ Nordic GmbH released the game through GamersGate.

== Plot ==
The game begins with a short background. Major cities of the United States have been attacked by nuclear weapons. Armies of terrorists flock the shores and have taken over most of the country. The player assumes the role of a United States Army National Guard soldier. He is called into the local military base, only to find it overrun by terrorists. From there, the mission is to defeat the terrorist invasion.

== Reception ==
Patriots: A Nation Under Fire was released to overwhelmingly negative reviews. It has been criticized for its poor quality, especially when it comes to graphical fidelity and gameplay. The game has been criticized for its extreme difficulty, even while playing on the easiest difficulty setting.

== Availability ==
Patriots: A Nation Under Fire is available to digital purchase on GamersGate.
