= Pro Pinball: Big Race USA =

1998 video game

- Developer: Cunning Developments
- Publisher: Empire Interactive
- Series: Pro Pinball
- Platforms: Microsoft Windows, PlayStation, Macintosh (Mac OS 9 or earlier)
- Release: Microsoft Windows: EU: 1998; NA: 30 January 1999; PlayStation: EU: 1998; NA: 31 July 2000
- Genre: Action
- Modes: Single-player, multiplayer

Pro Pinball: Big Race USA is an action video game developed by Cunning Developments, published by Empire Interactive and distributed by Take-Two Interactive for Microsoft Windows and PlayStation. It is the third game in the Pro Pinball series, and is themed around travelling around the United States in a car, similar to the Williams physical table Red & Ted's Road Show.

== Background ==
It is notable for having a lot more "simulation" features than its predecessor Pro Pinball: Timeshock!, such as ability to configure table angle, flipper strength and how "worn" the table should appear to be. It also features a skill level setting, perhaps in response to Pro Pinball: Timeshock!'s difficulty. It also has improved graphical features including a subtle texture on the ball (so you can see how the ball is spinning) and motion blur.

== Reception ==
Reception

Aggregate scores
| Aggregator | Score | |
| Aggregator | PC | PS |
|---|---|---|
| GameRankings | 79% | 71% |
| Metacritic | N/A | 69/100 |

Review scores
| Publication | Score | |
| Publication | PC | PS |
|---|---|---|
| AllGame | 4.5/5 | 3.5/5 |
| Computer Gaming World | 4.5/5 | N/A |
| Famitsu | N/A | 22/40 |
| GameRevolution | N/A | C+ |
| GameSpot | 8.7/10 | 6.8/10 |
| Hyper | 79/100 | N/A |
| IGN | 7.4/10 | 4.8/10 |
| Official U.S. PlayStation Magazine | N/A | 3.5/5 |
| PC Gamer (US) | 88% | N/A |
| PC Zone | 83% | N/A |
| PlayStation: The Official Magazine | N/A | 3/5 |
| The Cincinnati Enquirer | 3.5/4 | N/A |
| Playstation Plus | N/A | 89% |

The PlayStation version received "average" reviews according to the review aggregation website Metacritic. In Japan, where the same console version was ported and published by Syscom as part of the World Greatest Hits Series on 13 June 2002, Famitsu gave it a score of 22 out of 40.

The PC version received the "Special Award" for "Quick-Fix Gaming" from Computer Gaming World in 1999. The editors wrote that it "set a new standard in PC pinball" and "proved so incredibly addictive it might as well have shipped with a set of cranial meat hooks."
