= Pro Pinball: Fantastic Journey =

1999 video game

- Developer: Cunning Developments
- Publisher: Empire Interactive
- Director: Adrian Barritt
- Producers: Adrian Barritt; Roger Chueng
- Designers: Adrian Barritt; Graham Rice
- Programmers: Adrian Barritt; David Hunt; Adrian Page
- Artists: Tom Beesley; Graham Rice; Peter Richardson
- Composer: Jon Lowe
- Series: Pro Pinball
- Platforms: Microsoft Windows, PlayStation, Macintosh (Mac OS 9 or earlier)
- Release: Windows: NA: 31 December 1999; EU: 1999; PlayStation: NA: 17 October 2000; EU: 23 March 2001
- Genre: Action
- Modes: Single-player, multiplayer

Pro Pinball: Fantastic Journey is an action video game developed by Cunning Developments, published by Empire Interactive and distributed by Take-Two Interactive for Microsoft Windows and PlayStation. It is the fourth game in the Pro Pinball series. Elements of the game include combinations of Victorian era settings, steam powered machinery, steampunk style nautical adventures, and fictional islands.

== Gameplay ==
The player's perspective of the pinball table in Pro Pinball: Fantastic Journey is from approximately one foot or 30 cm above the table. The pinball flipper and plunger controls are operated by joystick, gamepad, or keyboard, depending on the operating system. Game options allow the table to play as if it were in an aged condition and at a slight angle, and players are also given the option to change the number of extra balls they receive, how many times a ball can be saved, as well as adjusting the table slope, plunger power, and general game difficulty.

There are five adventures in the game, each requiring the user to trigger certain elements of the board to keep the game moving forward. Levels of the game include tunneling to the Earth's core, navigating to the bottom of an ocean, traveling to a fictional island setting, and flying through mountainous terrain.

== Reception ==
Reception

Aggregate scores
| Aggregator | Score | |
| Aggregator | PC | PS |
|---|---|---|
| GameRankings | 72% | 65% |
| Metacritic | N/A | 60/100 |

Review scores
| Publication | Score | |
| Publication | PC | PS |
|---|---|---|
| AllGame | N/A | 3.5/5 |
| CNET Gamecenter | 8/10 | N/A |
| Computer Gaming World | 4.5/5 | N/A |
| Electronic Gaming Monthly | N/A | 5/10 |
| GameRevolution | N/A | B− |
| GameSpot | 7.5/10 | 6.7/10 |
| Gamezebo | 4/5 | N/A |
| GameZone | 6.5/10 | N/A |
| IGN | N/A | 4.8/10 |
| Next Generation | 4/5 | N/A |
| Official U.S. PlayStation Magazine | N/A | 3.5/5 |
| PC Accelerator | 8/10 | N/A |
| PC Gamer (US) | 82% | N/A |

The PlayStation version of Pro Pinball: Fantastic Journey received "mixed" reviews according to the review aggregation website Metacritic.

Most reviewers rated the same console version poorly in terms of gameplay substance and originality, but gave high ratings to its graphic properties, physics engine, and overall very good pinball simulation. One IGN author wrote of his experience playing the same console version: "I've had more fun watching my dog clean herself." The same author also commented that its pinball simulation was superior, with physics, movement, and design that very closely replicated those of an actual pinball table. Jeff Lundrigan of NextGen called the PC version "A pinball lover's dream. By all means, don't miss this one."

=== Awards ===
In 2000-2001 Pro Pinball: Fantastic Journey was recognized as the best puzzles/classics game for PC of the year in Computer Gaming World and Electronic Gaming Monthly's Game Blast 2000 awards.
