= Mario Pinball Land =

2004 video game

- North American box art
- Developer: Fuse Games
- Publisher: Nintendo
- Producer: Shigeru Miyamoto
- Composer: Kenichi Nishimaki
- Series: Mario
- Platform: Game Boy Advance
- Release: JP: August 26, 2004; NA: October 4, 2004; AU: October 28, 2004; EU: November 26, 2004
- Genre: Pinball
- Mode: Single-player

Mario Pinball Land, known in Europe and Japan as Super Mario Ball, (Note: Japanese: スーパーマリオボール, Hepburn: Sūpā Mario Bōru) is a 2004 pinball video game developed by Fuse Games and published by Nintendo for the Game Boy Advance. It is a spin-off of the Super Mario series. The game was later re-released for the Wii U Virtual Console.

The game received mixed reviews from critics, who praised the game's presentation, especially its excellent graphics, and its premise of blending Mario with pinball, but criticized its high difficulty level alongside the playfield reset mechanic of its tables, with some also faulting its overall short length.

== Gameplay ==
Mario, a ball, has just been hit by a flipper. Note the counters for stars, coins, and lives on the HUD.

The game is entirely single-player. To proceed, Mario must collect enough stars to open specific doors, a gameplay element borrowed from Super Mario 64. There are 35 stars to collect in total. Mario must explore different areas to reach his aim of saving the princess. There are five different worlds, each guarded by a boss. The worlds consist of the Fun Fair (the main starting area), Grassy Greens, Frosty Frontier, Shifting Sands, and Bowser's Castle.

== Plot ==
Mario and Princess Peach visit a funfair and wait in line to try a ride called the Air Cannon, where the rider is turned into a ball via the Spherasizer and shot out of the cannon. As Peach is about to take her turn, two Goombas kidnap her by aiming the cannon towards Bowser's Castle. To save Peach, Mario uses the Spherasizer to turn into a ball, allowing for the pinball action of the game.

== Development ==
As Adrian Barritt and Richard Horrocks, veterans of the Pro Pinball series, had founded Fuse Games, they decided that, in the words of Barritt, "we needed a bit of impact before they would even bother to speak to us". So they thought about a Mario pinball game, and produced a playable demo, featuring both the possible first area and the last one with a showdown with Bowser. Afterwards Barritt and Horrocks went to Seattle to pitch the idea to Nintendo of America executives, and were approved. As their resources were limited, Fuse decided not to develop the game for the GameCube, resorting to the Game Boy Advance instead. Barritt added that he considered the portable "[an] ideal platform for a pinball game, something that you can just pick up and knock the ball around for a bit" and stated that "with experience on systems like the Super Nintendo Entertainment System we knew we'd be able to push the hardware of the GBA very hard to its limits". Despite Fuse hiring more people, the whole game was created by a small team of only five people.

Mario Pinball Land was first announced under the working title of Mario Pinball in Nintendo's product release schedule on April 1, 2004, as one of two previously unannounced Mario titles for the GBA alongside an untitled new entry in the Mario Party series that would make use of the handheld's e-Reader peripheral, with a planned release date of May 24. Further details were later revealed during the 2004 E3 expo, with playable demos and a release date of October 4. The game's final name was announced in June 2004 on Nintendo's official website.

== Reception ==
Reception

Aggregate score
Aggregator	Score
Metacritic	62/100

Review scores
Publication	Score
Edge	4/10
Electronic Gaming Monthly	4/10
Eurogamer	5/10
Famitsu	29/40
Game Informer	7.5/10
GamePro	4/5
GameSpot	7.5/10
GameSpy	2.5/5
GameZone	8/10
IGN	5/10
Nintendo Life	7/10
Nintendo Power	3.8/5
Nintendo World Report	7.5/10

Mario Pinball Land received "mixed" reviews according to the review aggregation website Metacritic. In Japan, Famitsu gave it a score of three sevens and one eight for a total of 29 out of 40.

Most reviews praised the excellent graphics, but criticized the game for being difficult and for its overall gameplay. IGN's review in particular criticized the gameplay for having "bad table layouts with an overwhelmingly annoying 'playfield reset' element". The review concluded that "the gameplay itself is far more flawed and annoying than it is fun to play". Adrian Barritt later admitted that during development they wound up not making the game easy enough for pinball beginners as "you had to take the time to control the ball", which led to Fuse trying to not repeat the same mistakes in follow-up Metroid Prime Pinball. Nintendo World Report gave the game a 7.5/10. GameSpot praised the game by stating that it "combines Mario with pinball to create an interesting kind of adventure game that's fairly fun but a little on the short side". In a retrospective review, Nintendo Life considered that the game "holds its own as an oddball (pun intended) of the Mario spin-off series" and as a "single-player experience with beautiful visuals and an interesting medley of Mario and typical pinball". Regarding the gameplay, considered that its good aspects outweigh its bad aspects. They concluded by stating that while it won't give a "tremendous number of hours from it" it remains an "off-the-wall title worth a look for anyone looking for a more challenging romp through the Mushroom Kingdom".
