= Sea Life Safari =

2007 video game

- Developers: WildTangent; Wanako Games (XBLA)
- Publisher: Vivendi Games (Note: Released under the Sierra Online brand name)
- Platforms: Windows, Xbox 360 (XBLA)
- Release: Windows; August 16, 2007; Xbox 360; June 18, 2008
- Genre: Photography
- Mode: Single-player

Sea Life Safari is an underwater exploration video game originally developed by WildTangent for Microsoft Windows in 2007. Sierra Online released the game on Xbox Live Arcade on June 18, 2008.

Xbox Live Arcade version

== Reception ==
Reception

Aggregate score
Aggregator	Score
Metacritic	57/100

Review scores
Publication	Score
1Up.com	B
Eurogamer	6/10
GamesMaster	59%
GameSpot	3.5/10
IGN	4.5/10
Official Xbox Magazine (UK)	5/10
Official Xbox Magazine (US)	7/10
TeamXbox	8.1/10
Wired	5/10

The Xbox 360 version received "mixed" reviews according to the review aggregation website Metacritic. IGN reviewer Hilary Goldstein said of the same console version, "Sea Life Safari could have been a decent offering for children, but it falls short in far too many areas -- it's not educational, the photo analysis is inaccurate and it's not very fun." TeamXbox reviewer Andy Eddy was more kind, praising the presentation which "[is] a good feel for what it's like to be underwater—though not too photorealistic to make it dull and boring for the little ones."
