= Pro Pinball =

- Genre: Pinball
- Developer: Cunning Developments
- Publisher: Empire Interactive
- Platforms: MS-DOS, Microsoft Windows, Sega Saturn, PlayStation, Dreamcast, Xbox, PlayStation 2, Mac OS X, iOS, Android
- First release: Pro Pinball: The Web; July 1996
- Latest release: Pro Pinball: Fantastic Journey; 17 October 2000

Pro Pinball is a pinball video game series developed by Cunning Developments and published by Empire Interactive.

== Games ==
Aggregate review scores As of 9 January 2024.
Game	GameRankings	Metacritic
Pro Pinball: The Web	(PC) 74.00% (SAT) 55.00% (PS1) 53.67%	—
Pro Pinball: Timeshock!	(PC) 85.50% (PS1) 57.67%	—
Pro Pinball: Big Race USA	(PC) 78.50% (PS1) 71.33%	(PS1) 69
Pro Pinball: Fantastic Journey	(PC) 72.31% (PS1) 65.11%	(PS1) 60
Pro Pinball: Trilogy	—	—
Ultimate Pro Pinball	—	—
Pro Pinball Ultra	—	—

- 1996: Pro Pinball: The Web - SEGA Saturn, Sony PlayStation, Microsoft Windows
- 1997: Pro Pinball: Timeshock! - Microsoft Windows, Sony PlayStation
- 1999: Pro Pinball: Big Race USA - Microsoft Windows, Sony PlayStation
- 2000: Pro Pinball: Fantastic Journey - Microsoft Windows, Sony PlayStation
- 2001: Pro Pinball: Trilogy - SEGA Dreamcast
- 2005: Ultimate Pro Pinball - Sony PlayStation 2, Microsoft Xbox
- 2006: Ultimate Pro Pinball - Microsoft Windows
- 2016: Pro Pinball Ultra - iOS, Android, Microsoft Windows, Apple Macintosh

== Compilations ==
Pro Pinball Trilogy is a compilation of the newest three games in the series, which were Pro Pinball: Timeshock!, Pro Pinball: Big Race USA and Pro Pinball: Fantastic Journey. It was first released for Dreamcast in 2001, and then later rereleased on the PlayStation 2, Xbox and Microsoft Windows in 2005 under the title Ultimate Pro Pinball.

== Pro Pinball Ultra ==
Barnstorm Games, owner of Silverball Studios, a company created by the Pro Pinball original developers, launched a Kickstarter project to cover the costs of a Pro Pinball: Timeshock! remake called The ULTRA Edition. It successfully surpassed the £40,000 goal with £49,349. The new version was released for Windows, Mac, iOS, Android, and Linux.

A version for the Xbox 360's Xbox Live Arcade was somewhat confirmed to be in development, based on the unexpected addition to the "XBLA/Xbox 360" board on their official forums on September 2013. Additionally the staff member going by the user handle "Ade" posted in a topic "At the moment XBLA just includes Xbox 360. Other platforms may be supported eventually.".

As the Xbox One was to release later that month, fans requested if the developers would consider releasing for Microsoft's upcoming platform instead, or as well as the Xbox 360. Staff member going by the user handle "adpag" responded that "There are no firms plans to bring the game to the Xbox One at the moment, but we'd certainly like to do so." Ultimately, the game never released for Xbox 360 or Xbox One.

The iOS version of the game was released on 29 January 2015 and the Android version 22 July 2015. The PC version was then released on 21 July 2016.

The Android release was later removed from the Google Play Store in 2020 for unknown reasons, and the iOS and OSX release suffers from compatibility issues on updated devices, and so currently the only way to successfully purchase and play "The ULTRA Edition" is on Steam for Windows.
