= Polar Golfer =

2004 video game

- Developer: WildTangent
- Publisher: WildTangent
- Platform: Microsoft Windows
- Release: September 1, 2004
- Genre: Sports

Polar Golfer is a golf video game created by WildTangent, released on Microsoft Windows in 2004. The game is played on an 18-hole virtual golf course, with various characters. It is sometimes bundled with Dell computers, along with other software.

== Sequel ==
A sequel titled, Polar Golfer: Pineapple Cup, was released in April of the following year.
