= Plasma Pong =

- Programmer: Steve Taylor
- Platforms: Mac OS X, Windows
- Release: April 20, 2007
- Genre: Pong
- Modes: Single-player, multiplayer

Plasma Pong is an unfinished video game created by American programmer Steve Taylor when he was attending George Mason University. It is an enhanced version of Atari, Inc.'s Pong where the ball and paddles move through a multicolored substance simulated via fluid dynamics. The game received positive attention, but development was put on hiatus in 2007 after receiving a cease and desist notice from the Pong trademark owner, Atari Interactive.

== Gameplay ==
Two players control a paddle each, at either side of the screen, volleying a ball between them. The environment is a fluid-like plasma which can be pushed and sucked with the paddles.

There are three game modes. In single-player, the player combats a progressively smarter AI in a fluid environment where the fluid moves faster and faster, affecting the ball more and more. Multiplayer is little different, with two players typically sharing a single keyboard to play against each other. The sandbox mode, however, gives the player near total access to color, particle, and fluid motion effects, allowing them to simply play around with the game's fluid dynamics engine and see what interesting motions they can create.

== Reception ==
Wired News included Plasma Pong on a list of the best indie games of 2007. They highlighted the complex but manageable gameplay and beautiful graphics, but criticized the occasionally unpredictable ball control. In June 2007, The Washington Post described the game as "sort of like playing Ping-Pong while floating in melted lollipops".

== Legacy ==
An HTML5 remake was made by another programmer.
