= Puppet Guardian =

2007 video game

- A player armed with a Long Sword encounters a crocodile in the Golden Jungle.
- Developer(s): Cold Breath, Co., Ltd.
- Publisher(s): Artifact, Co., Ltd. (Japanese Version) and Mirror Realms, LLC (English Version)
- Designer(s): Kentaro Ishizaka
- Platform(s): Microsoft Windows, Mac OS X
- Release: April 1, 2007 (Japanese Beta Version); October 1, 2007 (Japanese Version); January 1, 2009 (English Beta Version)
- Genre(s): MMORPG, Board Game

Puppet Guardian is a Flash-based MMORPG (Massively Multiplayer Online Role-Playing Game) created by the Japanese game developer Cold Breath, Co., Ltd.. The game is operated in the United States through a partnership between Policros, LLC and Artifact, Co., Ltd. Puppet Guardian was officially released out of beta production on October 1, 2007.

Puppet Guardian was created developed by Kentaro Ishizaka, who founded Cold Breath in June 2006. Ishizaka is a game creator of some renown in Japan who also created the successful Livly Island, which won the 2006 Web Money award for most profitable online game. That game is now operated by Sony and is available through its online portal So-net in 2007. Ishizaka also produced Bar Village another online gaming environment. Puppet Guardian is a free-to-play game, with a simple interface that is accessible on most recent versions of those web browsers available for Mac OS X and Windows XP or Windows Vista.

The game combines qualities of two different yet popular game genres: online role playing games and traditional board games. Puppet Guardian takes place in the fantasy-themed Celestial Castle, which is divided into eight towers, each representing the memory of a different journey taken by the game's protagonist, Org, and his wife, Yun. Players can travel throughout the Castle on foot or by horse, and—once in the tower scenes, which represent the different lands of the Org's realm—using virtual dice.

Each tower is inhabited by different types of monsters for players to subdue; and each tower makes different materials available for players to obtain. Unlike many other MMORPGs, there is no linear path that must be followed. Players appear on the screen as customizable characters, setting their own objectives. Players can subdue monsters and other creatures they encounter, but there is no combat between players. Neither is there competition between players. Players complete quests by traveling through the towers in a fashion similar to moving around a board game. Players interact with each other through trading, chatting, becoming "friends" and forming teams to share resources for their journeys.
