= Poi (video game) =

2017 video game

- Steam capsule image featuring the two protagonists
- Developer: PolyKid
- Publishers: PolyKid; Alliance Digital Media (NS)
- Directors: Paul Ewers; Ben Gable
- Artist: David Hattori
- Composer: Lyndon Holland
- Engine: Unity
- Platforms: Linux; macOS; Microsoft Windows; Nintendo Switch; PlayStation 4; Xbox One
- Release: Linux, macOS, Microsoft Windows: WW: February 1, 2017; PlayStation 4, Xbox One: WW: June 27, 2017; Nintendo Switch: WW: October 23, 2017
- Genre: Platformer
- Mode: Single-player

Poi is an indie 3D platformer released on Linux, macOS and Microsoft Windows via Steam, Nintendo Switch, PlayStation 4 and Xbox One. Poi was the first game developed by PolyKid, an independent studio made up of graduates from the DigiPen Institute of Technology. Following an unsuccessful Kickstarter campaign in August 2015, the game was released via Steam Early Access the following November and remained in active development until a finished version was released in February 2017, followed by home console ports later that year.

== Gameplay ==
Poi follows a pair of orphaned twin children, a boy and a girl, who are invited by an older adventurer known as the Master Explorer to join the crew of his flying airship in his quest to find a mystical treasure known as the Milky Way Globe. Having lost his collection of valuable Explorer Medallions after they were scattered during a violent storm, the Master Explorer requests the twins help retrieve them along the way. The player can choose to play as either the boy or the girl and can switch between the two while on the airship, though their abilities are identical. The player characters can run, jump, roll, swim, climb specific surfaces, double jump, cross tightropes, wall jump, and glide using a parasail to help them traverse the environment. The player characters have no physical attacks, and can only defeat enemies by jumping on them or kicking specific objects at them.

The sky surrounding the Master Explorer's airship acts as the central hub, from which the player can access any of the game's worlds. There are four main worlds, each one a closed environment that the player can explore at their own pace. Progression is similar to Super Mario 64: when the player enters a world, they are presented with a task to complete such as gathering coins or keys, finishing an obstacle course, or defeating a boss, among others. Completing one of these tasks will grant the player an Explorer Medallion and return them to the hub world to choose their next destination. A certain number of Explorer Medallions are required to unlock each new world, with a total of 101 Explorer Medallions available to collect in the game. While exploring a world, the player can pick up coins that act as in-game currency and hearts that restore their character's health. Checkpoints are placed throughout each world; if the player character runs out of health, they lose any coins they have collected in that world and their progress is reset back to the last checkpoint they touched. Each world also contains many other collectibles to find, including points of interest on the map, fossils to be excavated, and extra costumes that change the player characters' appearance.

The player can use the coins they collect in the worlds to purchase Explorer Tools from the Master Explorer. Some of these tools are passive upgrades that enhance the player characters, such as a magnet to draw in coins from further away or an extra heart to increase the characters' maximum health; others are items that the player can equip and use, including a shovel to dig up fossils and a camera to take photographs. Coins can also be exchanged with a traveling merchant for access to challenge stages that will grant the player additional Explorer Medallions upon completion. As the player collects Explorer Medallions and completes certain tasks, the sky around the airship will populate with landmasses containing entrances to smaller bonus worlds and minigames, as well as other non-player characters to interact with. These characters will reward the player with additional Explorer Medallions for completing extra objectives or finding each world's bonus collectibles, such as an archaeologist searching for fossils or another adventurer in need of golden gears to repair her airship. Completing the game unlocks a more difficult New Game Plus mode, which mirrors the game's worlds and severely limits the player character's health.

== Development ==
Poi was the first game developed by PolyKid, a small independent studio founded by DigiPen Institute of Technology graduates Paul Ewers and Ben Gable. The two sought to create a new 3D platformer that evoked the spirit of classic entries in the genre such as Super Mario 64, Banjo-Kazooie, and Super Mario Sunshine. The game was first announced in June 2015 for release on Microsoft Windows and Wii U, alongside plans for a Kickstarter campaign to help fund its development. The campaign launched on August 4, 2015, with a target goal of $80,000, but ultimately proved unsuccessful, raising only $27,236. However, PolyKid maintained that development on the game would continue in spite of the campaign's failure.

On November 6, 2015, Poi was released via the Steam Early Access service. PolyKid continued active development on the game over the following year, updating the early access build as progress was made. The game ultimately left Early Access and was officially released via Steam on February 1, 2017. Ports of the game for the PlayStation 4 and Xbox One were released digitally on June 27, 2017. A port for the Nintendo Switch published by Alliance Digital Media, dubbed the "Explorer Edition", received a digital and physical release on October 23, 2017. This version includes optional motion control support, as well as new character costume pieces and a digital art book.

== Reception ==
Reception

Aggregate score
| Aggregator | Score |
|---|---|
| Metacritic | (NS) 65/100 |

Review scores
| Publication | Score |
|---|---|
| Destructoid | 8/10 |
| Nintendo Life | 8/10 |
| Nintendo World Report | 7.5/10 |

The Nintendo Switch version of Poi received an average score of 65/100 from review aggregator Metacritic, indicating mixed reception. Destructoid called the game "a competent love letter to the 3D Mario games we love that manages to give players a nice taste of nostalgia while still having its own charm." Nintendo World Report similarly praised the gameplay and feel of the game, but lamented that it often felt derivative of the previous 3D Super Mario titles it was inspired by, drawing direct comparisons between various elements in Poi and Super Mario 64. Nintendo Life praised the breadth of content and constant influx of new things to do, but criticized the repetition of some of the game's tasks as well as the occasional imprecision of the controls.
