= PinGame Journal =

Hobbyist periodical

- Publisher: Jim Schelberg
- Frequency: 8 Times/year
- Circulation: 1300
- First issue: May, 1991
- Website: www.pingamejournal.com

The PinGame Journal is a publication serving the pinball hobby community. It reports on the manufacture of new games, industry and hobby events, as well as ways to fix and refurbish both current and classic pinball machines.

In early 1991 the primary publication for the pinball hobby was the Pinball Trader Newsletter. Its publisher, Dennis Dodel of St. Louis, Missouri, indicated to his subscribers that after five years of publication, he was ready to stop. One subscriber and contributor, Jim Schelberg from the Detroit, Michigan area, offered to help. As the discussion progressed, Dodel received an offer he accepted from subscribers Jack Simonton and Karl May of California to purchase the Trader outright.

Already "geared up" Schelberg was considering what to do with his newly developed interest when Dodel suggested he "start a magazine yourself!" The first issue of the PinGame Journal was published in May, 1991, and was distributed to 85 subscribers who paid the subscription rate on faith. As a hobby magazine, the "casually monthly" publication schedule has produced an average of eight issues annually and has been in continuous publication to this day with a current subscription base of over 1300 pinball enthusiasts world wide.

This full color, 8.5 x 11 inch format publication is usually 32 pages in length. Its focus, often in great detail, is on all aspects of pinball manufacturing, playing, collecting and restoration.

The PinGame Journal exists to promote pinball as the unique, historic, mechanical action amusement device it is.
