= Pine (video game) =

- Developer: Twirlbound
- Publisher: Kongregate
- Engine: Unity
- Platforms: Linux; macOS; Microsoft Windows; Nintendo Switch; PlayStation 4
- Release: Linux, macOS, Microsoft Windows: WW: 10 October 2019; Nintendo Switch: WW: 26 November 2019; PlayStation 4: WW: 10 March 2021
- Genres: Action-Adventure, Open world
- Mode: Single-player

Pine is an adventure game developed by Twirlbound and published by Kongregate. Funded through a Kickstarter crowdfunding campaign in April 2017, it was released in October 2019 for Microsoft Windows, macOS, Linux and Nintendo Switch.

== Gameplay ==
Pine is an open world action adventure game. Through traversal, puzzling, combat and trading, the player finds their way through a game ecology that constantly changes.

Pine's world is based on a simulation, meaning that all actors inside are governed by an overarching system of schedules, rules and reaction matrices. The NPCs, who all belong to a certain species, are organized inside villages the player can visit. These villages are dynamic, and can be any of three sizes (A, B, C) or not exist at all at any point in the game.

Through an affinity system and gameplay mechanics that influence the relationship the player has with these other species, the player needs to reach their goals with the help of other tribes.

== Plot ==
Pine is set on the island of Albamare in a world in which the human species has never reached the top of the food chain. Instead, other animals took the chance to evolve and develop a language and culture of their own. Humans, being physically inferior to these other species, are confined to a small cliff where they live an isolated, self-sustaining life.

But life on the cliff as the humans know it is in danger because of the continued straining of the natural elements around them. The situation is deemed unsustainable by some in the small tribe, among whom is Amam, brother of protagonist Hue. However, the leadership doesn't want to hear it - they've always managed on the cliff, and they always will, is their point of view.

A fatal accident with one of the new-built treehouses convinces Hue, the game's protagonist, to go out into the world for the first time and try to find a solution elsewhere. He embarks on a journey to find a new home for humans to live, amidst the politics of the stirring ecology of Albamare.

Together with a neutral species called the Tambas, Hue manages to get a foot in the door with any of the dynamic species the game offers. He discovers that humans have been among these other species on the mainland before, ages ago, and that something happened there that makes the other societies avert their eyes whenever they see a human to this day.

Hue explores the Vaults, ancient structures built in cooperation with the humans of old, to find answers and possibly a place to live.

== Development ==
Pine, developed by Dutch developer Twirlbound, was partly funded in April 2017 via a Kickstarter crowdfunding campaign, with over 4000 backers, for an amount of €121,480. Its initial goal was €100,000.

== Reception ==
Reception

Aggregate score
| Aggregator | Score |
|---|---|
| Metacritic | NS: 48/100 |

Upon release, Nintendo Life gave a score for the Switch version a 4 out of 10, concluding that the game "could have been a lot better", noting that its technical ambition became too much for the game on Switch.

Twirlbound has introduced numerous patches to fix technical issues with that version, jumping ahead to an official 2.0 release to mark a plethora of improvements done in September 2020.
