= Prodigy Tactics =

2018 video game

- Original Prodigy logo
- Developer: Hanakai Studio
- Publishers: Forever Entertainment; PlayWay; Ultimate Games
- Engine: Unreal Engine 4
- Platform: Windows
- Release: September 28, 2018
- Genre: Tactical role-playing
- Modes: Single-player, multiplayer

Prodigy Tactics (originally titled Prodigy) is a tactical role-playing video game developed by Hanakai Studio. The game features figurines representing characters in the game and uses cards to control their behaviors, such as attacking. Both cards and figurines are placed on a game board, with their position on the board influencing their powers and abilities. After an initial release date set in 2015 and not in 2016, the studio announced that Prodigy's release would be delayed due to an upgrade of its gameplay system. A Kickstarter campaign to fund the game's alpha and beta phases began in April 2014, with a $100,000 funding goal. It reached its goal in just three days, eventually collecting $200,000 from over 1,000 backers. An incomplete version of the game was released in September 2018, physical goods from the Kickstarter campaign remain unfulfilled.

== Gameplay ==
Prodigy Tactics was intended to be a tactical role-playing game played with figurines representing game characters placed on a 3x4 board. The board uses near field communication (NFC) technology. Each square on the board's grid gives different capabilities to the characters in the video game. The front row gives offensive bonuses, while the back row gives defensive bonuses. The middle line is neutral. Characters can be moved freely around the board, with no action points or other forms of limitation. There was to be an initial group of 23 figurines for the game.

The player places Arcana cards on the game board to make characters perform actions such as attacking. Combinations of cards placed on the board trigger special actions unique to each character. Special skills, unlike normal actions, require mana.

The game was to included a large single-player campaign including boss battles, as well as competitive multiplayer. In both modes, the player's team is controlled through the figurines, while the opponent's or IA's team is displayed on the video game screen as the physical item support was removed this is now incomplete.

== Plot ==
There are two main factions in the game. The Sorcerer Kings are powerful masters of mana who control the northern territories. The Free People are slaves and soldiers who rebelled against their former masters and now control the southern territories.

Henchmen are characters who can join any Company of the Sorcerer Kings, while Allies can join any Free People Company. Legends are more powerful than Henchmen and Allies, and can fight for any Company. Bosses can also be controlled by anyone, but can also be fought against.

== Development ==
All of the figures are much more detailed than similar figurines for games such as Skylanders and Disney Infinity, and were designed by veteran figurine modeler Jean Bey, who had previously funded miniature figure game developer Rackham.
