= Polar Bowler =

2004 video game

- Developers: WildTangent (PC, iOS); Engine Software (DS)
- Publishers: WildTangent (PC, iOS); MumboJumbo (DS)
- Platforms: Microsoft Windows; Nintendo DS; iOS; Android
- Release: Microsoft Windows: NA: August 3, 2004; Nintendo DS: NA: March 16, 2009; iOS, Android: NA: April 1, 2014
- Genre: Sports

Polar Bowler is a bowling video game created by WildTangent for the Microsoft Windows operating system. It was released in 2004 and distributed by WildTangent in a CD called Polar Games. It was released for the Nintendo DS in 2009.

It was later re-imagined as Polar Bowler 1st Frame for mobile smartphones and tablets and was released in 2013. Polar Bowler 1st Frame reintroduced the bowler as PB and introduced his valet, J. The player launches PB down a 10 pin bowling lane and knocks over as many pins as they can. As PB speeds down the lane, his direction may be steered by the player. Occasionally, crates will drop in the middle of the bowling lane to be collected by the player. Inside of the crates are boosts (such as Inflate, Snowball Throw, and a Balloon Pop) or multipliers that allow the player to attain a higher Polar Score.

The game does not solely rely on bowling scoring. There is a scoring system called "Polar Scoring" which scores based on how many pins are knocked over, the velocity at which they are struck, hitting the bumpers multiple times, etc. This score is what is tracked in the leaderboards.
