= Pirates of Black Cove =

2011 real-time strategy video game

- Developer(s): Nitro Games
- Publisher(s): Paradox Interactive
- Platform(s): Microsoft Windows
- Release: NA: August 2, 2011; EU: August 26, 2011; AU: May 20, 2014
- Genre(s): Real-time strategy
- Mode(s): Single-player

Pirates of Black Cove is a pirate-themed real-time strategy game published by Paradox Interactive in August 2011.

== Gameplay ==
The player plays as one of three pirates sailing in an open sea in the Caribbean collecting items and fighting enemy ships. The game mixes adventure and strategy. The player can enter a port and take control as the captain and his mates. More mates can be recruited from pirate strongholds and each has its own special abilities.

== Reception ==
Reception

Aggregate score
Aggregator	Score
Metacritic	56/100

Review scores
Publication	Score
4Players	40%
The A.V. Club	D+
Destructoid	7/10
GameSpot	3.5/10
GameStar	48%
GameTrailers	5/10
IGN	5.5/10
Jeuxvideo.com	11/20
PC Gamer (UK)	65%
PC Games (DE)	57%
The Digital Fix	6/10

The game received "mixed" reviews according to the review aggregation website Metacritic. IGN and GameSpot praised the game's vibrant visuals and charming presentation, but heavily criticized the gameplay and repetitiveness.
