= Prism: Light the Way =

2007 video game

- Developers: Morpheme Game Studios; Zattikka (iOS)
- Publishers: Eidos Interactive; Zattikka (iOS)
- Designer: Morpheme Game Studios
- Platforms: Mobile phone (Java ME), Windows, Nintendo DS, iOS
- Release: Mobile; 2006; Windows; November 2006; Nintendo DS: EU: September 21, 2007; NA: October 17, 2007; AU: October 25, 2007; iPhone; June 25, 2010 iPad; August 18, 2010
- Genre: Puzzle
- Mode: Single-player

Prism: Light the Way is a two-dimensional puzzle video game developed by British company Morpheme Game Studios. In the game, the player, with the help of "Bulboids" that emit light beams, must direct the correct color of light into the "Glowbos". To aid in this objective are a variety of mirrors, T-splitters, filter blocks, and Prisms, collectively called Gluons.

== Gameplay ==
Screenshot of gameplay

The object of the game is to light up all of the Glowbos at the same time with their respective color. The game consists of five different game modes including Puzzle, Time, Hyper, Infinite, and Tutorial. The Puzzle game mode has 15 levels of 8 stages each totaling 120 puzzles altogether. There is also a scoreboard that keeps track of your best times for each puzzle.

The various Gluons are there to aid you in redirecting the light from the Bulboids into the Glowbos positioned in various places on each puzzle:

- Mirrors: Redirect the light to the Glowbos. Note: Both sides of the mirror can reflect the light.
- T-Splitters: Splits light into two separate beams. Faces all four directions and cannot be rotated.
- Filter Blocks: Change the white light beams into colored beams to match the Glowbo.
- Prisms: Split the light into every color out three different directions.
- Cycloids: Cycle through different colors. Redirects the light to the way they are facing.

== Reception ==
Reception

Aggregate score
Aggregator	Score
Metacritic	73/100

Review scores
Publication	Score
Eurogamer	5/10
Famitsu	26/40
Game Informer	7.5/10
GamePro	3.5/5
GameSpot	6.5/10
GameTrailers	8.5/10
GameZone	7/10
IGN	7/10
Nintendo Power	8.5/10
Pocket Gamer	(iOS) 3/5

The DS version received "mixed or average reviews" according to the review aggregation website Metacritic. Nintendo Power gave the European import a favorable review, nearly two months before its U.S. release date. In Japan, where the same DS version was ported and published by Interchannel under the name Illumis Light: Hikari no Puzzle (イルミスライト -ひかりのパズル-, Irumisu Raito -Hikari no Pazuru-; lit. "Illumis Light: Puzzle of Light") on September 18, 2008, Famitsu gave it a score of 26 out of 40.
