= Please Fix the Road =

2022 video game

- Developer: Arielek
- Publisher: Silesia Games
- Platforms: Windows, Nintendo Switch, PlayStation 4, PlayStation 5, Xbox One, Xbox Series X/S
- Release: Windows; 10 June 2022; Switch, PS4, PS5, XONE, XSX; 16 May 2024
- Genre: Puzzle
- Mode: Single-player

Please Fix the Road is a 2022 puzzle video game developed by Polish studio Arielek and published by Silesia Games. It was released in June 2022 for Windows; the game is unique in that a compromised version is also offered free-to-play for players who would rather pirate video games through a torrent. It was available in May 2024 for Nintendo Switch. The game received a positive reception, with praise for its calm atmosphere and graphics, but criticism for its gameplay.

== Gameplay ==
In Please Fix the Road, the player must finish an incomplete road using their provided resources. Across 160 levels, the player has a limited amount of bombs to clear land and road tiles to add paths, both of which come in different shapes and sizes. In some levels of the game, the terrain is uneven, and the player may also have to finish a railroad or canal network. At any point in the game, they can undo a move, take a hint, or restart the level.

== Development and release ==
Please Fix the Road was developed by Arielek, the solo developer studio of Ariel Jurkowski. The game was previously a Flash game produced in 2014. The game was released on June 10, 2022, for Windows, and on May 16, 2024, for Nintendo Switch. Jurkowski also released the game for torrent sites, allowing users to download a pirated version with no updates and limited features, and several pirate-themed changes.

== Reception ==
Reception

Aggregate scores
Aggregator	Score
Metacritic	80/100
OpenCritic	80% recommend

Review score
Publication	Score
The Guardian	4/5 stars

The game has a "generally favorable" score of 80 on Metacritic. On OpenCritic, the game has a "strong" approval rating of 80%.

Critics appreciated Please Fix the Road's quiet nature. Keith Stuart of The Guardian compared the game to a combination of Tetris and Pipe Mania, giving praise to its gradual learning curve. However, critics noticed the game's lack of camera rotation and its overuse of "trial and error" gameplay.

The game's graphics and animation were praised. Ed Nightingale of Eurogamer praised how the visuals added a "cinematic flair", while Vandal's Manu Delgado commented that the game's minimalist graphics hinder the player's ability to preview their next move.
