= Panzer Commander =

1998 video game

- Developer: Ultimation Inc.
- Publisher: Strategic Simulations
- Platform: Windows
- Release: NA: May 15, 1998; EU: 1998
- Genre: Vehicle simulation
- Modes: Single-player, multiplayer

Panzer Commander is a computer tank-driving simulator released in 1998. Developed by Ultimation Inc. and published by Strategic Simulations Inc. (SSI). The game is set in World War II as a tank simulator.

== Gameplay ==
In the game the player takes command of an armored fighting vehicles (AFV). There are over 20 driveable tanks from Germany, Russia, the United States, and Britain and 28 support vehicles.

There are ten scenarios for each nationality and six campaigns - three German and three Russian. The game also offers Direct3D acceleration, an expansive scenario editor, and highly receptive multiplayer support for up to six players over LAN or the Internet.

The gameplay revolves around scripted scenarios with time limits. Infantry is represented by static emplacements and fortifications and artillery and air support are not under your control.

== Reception ==
Reception

Aggregate score
Aggregator	Score
GameRankings	71%

Review scores
Publication	Score
AllGame	3.5/5
CNET Gamecenter	7/10
Computer Games Strategy Plus	1.5/5
Computer Gaming World	4/5
GameSpot	6.9/10
IGN	7/10
Next Generation	4/5
PC Gamer (US)	75%
PC PowerPlay	58%
PC Zone	70%

The game received above-average reviews according to the review aggregation website GameRankings. Next Generation said of the game, "It's good-looking and historically accurate, and it controls well. What more could any tank fan ask for?"
