= Protöthea =

- Developer(s): Digital Builders; Sabarasa (WiiWare)
- Publisher(s): ABC Entertainment; Ubisoft (WiiWare)
- Designer(s): Alejandro Vairoli
- Engine: Torque Game Engine (WiiWare)
- Platform(s): Windows, Wii (WiiWare)
- Release: Windows: NA: June 13, 2005; WiiWare: NA: June 2, 2008; EU: October 23, 2009
- Genre(s): Shoot 'em up
- Mode(s): Single player

Protöthea is a shoot 'em up video game developed by Argentinian studio Digital Builders originally released for Windows PCs in 2005. A redesigned version for WiiWare was released in North America on June 2, 2008 and in Europe on October 23, 2009.

The PC version of the game was the winner of the Cartoon Network-sponsored Project Goldmaster Award at the 2005 Independent Games Festival.

== Gameplay ==
Protöthea is a scrolling vertical shooter with 3D graphics played from a top down perspective. Controls for movement and aiming of weapons are separate, with players manipulating an aiming cursor on screen, similar to Geometry Wars. Players are tasked with destroying an asteroid, Maqno 01, and eliminate an enemy faction named The Core who wish to mine it and others like it in order to build an army of war machines.

The Wii version of Protöthea brings a number of additional features to the game including additional levels, enemies and power-ups, in addition to enhanced and redesigned graphics. Control has also been designed to take advantage of the Wii Remote, with the pointer function used to aim the targeting cursor, and the Nunchuck used to move the player's ship.

== Reception ==
IGN gave the WiiWare version of Protöthea a 5/10, claiming the game "doesn't look that great, doesn't sound that great, and doesn't offer much creativity" and calling the shoot 'em up gameplay challenging but uninteresting. They were also disappointed by the lack of polish in the presentation, and felt that Ubisoft's decision to bring the game to WiiWare in the first place was "random".
