= Paris 1313 =

1999 video game

- Developer: Dramaera
- Publishers: Index+ Canal+ Multimedia; France Telecom Multimedia; Microïds
- Platform: Windows PC
- Release: 1999
- Genres: Adventure, Educational

Paris 1313: The Mystery of Notre-Dame Cathedral is a video game released in 1999, developed by Dramaera and is a co-production between Index+, Canal+ Multimedia, France Telecom Multimedia and Microïds. The Musée National du Moyen Age, (National Museum of the Middle Ages) contributed to the game.

== Plot ==
The game is, as the title describes, set in the year 1313 in Paris, France. During celebrations in front of the Notre-Dame Cathedral, Adam, a goldsmith working on behalf of the king, mysteriously disappears. The player assumes the roles of three characters who set off in search of Adam: Jacques, his brother, actress Rosemonde, and circus-rider Pierre de Cinnq-Ormes. Each character must assist each other, avoid all the traps and find all the clues in time. Other elements of the game are participating in an archery contest, and navigating the taverns of Paris to gather information.

== Gameplay ==
The game mostly plays as a straightforward point-and-click adventure, where players collect information from characters and use items in their inventory to solve puzzles.

== Critical reception ==
Ray Ivey of Just Adventure deemed the game short but enjoyable.
