= Perimeter (video game) =

2004 video game

- Developer: K-D Lab
- Publisher: RU: 1C Company; Codemasters
- Series: Perimeter
- Platform: Windows
- Release: EU: May 21, 2004; AU: June 4, 2004; NA: June 29, 2004
- Genre: Real-time strategy
- Modes: Single-player, multiplayer

Perimeter (Russian: Периметр) is a real-time strategy video game developed by Russian studio K-D Lab for Windows. It is published by 1C Company and Codemasters, and was released in 2004.

== Gameplay ==
In Perimeter, ground must be terraformed before buildings can be built on it. Some weapons can distort the ground, which will cause constant damage to buildings until the ground is re-terraformed.

Buildings must also be placed on a power grid formed by Energy Cores linked to the player's Frame. A building that loses connection to the power grid stops working and may be captured by an enemy player who connects it to their own Energy Core network. Thus destroying Energy Cores to disconnect parts of an enemy's base is a possible strategy on certain maps.

Energy Cores also produce energy, the game's only resource. The amount of energy generated depends on the total area of terraformed ground covered by the player's Energy Cores.

Energy Cores can activate the titular Perimeter, an impenetrable barrier that destroys any enemies passing through it. However, this drains a large amount of energy.

Only 3 basic units (Soldier, Officer and Technician) can be built in factories, the more advanced units are created by morphing squads of basic units. Each unit type requires a certain amount of basic units, so for example if a unit costs 6 Soldiers and 2 Officers, a squad containing 20 Soldiers and 7 Officers could be morphed into 3 of the advanced unit, with 2 Soldiers and 1 Officer left over. Morphing is not permanent, so the squad can later be morphed into a different advanced unit, or reverted into basic units. More advanced units require the construction of laboratories before they can be morphed.

The available military units include land-based, flying and underground units, with various weapons such as lasers, rockets and bombs. Defensive turrets may also be built to attack incoming enemy units.

The 3 factions found in the game (Exodus, Empire and Harkback) share most of their technology, but each faction has its own specialized lab that unlocks faction-specific units.

The goal of the game varies by mission. For example, the mission may require players to capture or destroy an enemy Frame, destroy Scourge nests, build a certain structure at a certain location, or charge up the Frame's Spiral to warp through a portal.

== Plot ==
Humanity has undergone radical changes in society. Scientists and spiritual leaders became one and the same, calling themselves Spirits. The Spirits, foreseeing the inevitable destruction of Earth due to the ravages of our time, directed scientific efforts into the discovery of a new plane of existence: the Psychosphere. The Psychosphere acted as a conduit, providing means to reach another, untouched world, a new Promised Land, by jumping between flat worlds within the Psychosphere. The Psychosphere is appropriately named, as the various worlds resemble the thoughts and actions that have occurred upon Earth during its history. The Spirits then embarked upon the construction of massive floating city-ships called Frames, which could house hundreds of thousands of people for an indefinite period of time. With the Frames completed, the Spirits sent them forth into the Psychosphere with the intent to lead their people to the Promised Land, leaving Earth behind forever.

Within each of the Frames, the Spirits formed Spirit Councils which exercised absolute authority in all matters relating to the Frame. The general populace were kept sedate and forced into a ritualistic spiritualism to control their minds, for it was soon discovered that the Psychosphere reacted to negative emotions; causing creatures known as Scourge to erupt out of the very ground and attack the Frames. Eventually, some of the citizens of the Frames began to revolt against the rule of the Spirit Council, and the Frames began to separate into three factions: the Exodus who continued to follow the guidance of the Spirits and seek the Promised Land, the Harkback who reject the rule of the Spirits and seek to return to Earth, and the Empire who reject the Spirits, the idea of the Promised Land, and Earth, seeking to establish a cybernetic Human empire within the Psychosphere itself.

As the game progresses, the various factions come into contact, and eventually combat, with one another's Frames and with the Scourge. Exodus continues to move through the Chain of Worlds to its very end; Harkback move to the Root Worlds at the very beginning of the Chain, and the Empire tries to dominate both sides. Ultimately Exodus destroys the primary Imperial Frame near a portal to the Promised Land, and then move through the portal. Meanwhile, the Harkback find the Root Worlds and a portal back to Earth, also moving through. However, both factions end up near one another on the Promised Land, which appears to be Earth as it was millions of years ago. This sets the scene for the game's sequel.

== Reception ==
Perimeter

Aggregate score
Aggregator	Score
Metacritic	77/100

Review scores
Publication	Score
1Up.com	B−
Edge	8/10
Game Informer	7.75/10
GameSpot	8.2/10
GameSpy	4/5
GameZone	8.7/10
IGN	8/10
PC Gamer (UK)	90%
PC Gamer (US)	69%
PC Zone	81%
The New York Times	(mixed)

The game received "favorable" reviews according to video game review aggregator Metacritic. It was nominated for GameSpot's annual "Most Innovative Game" award, which went to Katamari Damacy.

== Perimeter: Emperor's Testament ==
Perimeter: Emperor's Testament
- Developer: (Russia) K-D Lab
- Publishers: 1C Company (RU), Paradox Interactive (WW)
- Series: Perimeter
- Platform: Microsoft Windows
- Release: RU: November 6, 2005; AS: August 29, 2006; EU: August 29, 2006; NA: September 4, 2006
- Genre: Real-time strategy
- Modes: Single-player, Multiplayer

A stand-alone expansion pack titled Perimeter: Emperor's Testament was published by 1C Company and first released in Russia on November 6, 2005. It was then published by Paradox Interactive for release in several worldwide regions in second half of 2006.

=== Reception ===
Perimeter: Emperor's Testament

Aggregate score
Aggregator	Score
Metacritic	72/100

Review scores
Publication	Score
GameSpot	7.3/10
GameZone	8.5/10
IGN	7.6/10
PC Gamer (UK)	75%
PC Gamer (US)	70%
PC Zone	72%

The expansion pack received "average" reviews according to video game review aggregator Metacritic.

== Sequel ==
K-D Lab released a sequel Perimeter 2: New Earth in 2008.

== Releasing of the source code ==
In 2021 the chief creator Andrey KranK Kuzmin released source code to GitHub with an open license GPLv3, excluding game data (models, textures, music).

== Legate Edition ==
PERIMETER: Legate Edition was released for Windows on May 20, 2024. This edition have a support of Linux, textures for high format monitors, support of mods and expansion pack Perimeter: Emperor's Testament.

== See also ==
- Maelstrom: The Battle for Earth Begins
- Vangers
