= Gore: Ultimate Soldier =

2002 video game

- Developer: 4D Rulers
- Publisher: DreamCatcher Interactive
- Engine: AMP Game Engine
- Platform: Microsoft Windows
- Release: June 3, 2002
- Genre: First-person shooter
- Modes: Single-player, multiplayer

Gore: Ultimate Soldier, also known as simply Gore, is a first-person shooter video game for Microsoft Windows, released on June 3, 2002. It was published by DreamCatcher Interactive and developed by 4D Rulers.

== Gameplay ==
The player's ability to move quickly and jump high is affected by the stamina system. Stamina is usually lost when running or jumping, but being injured by weapons also does a toll on it. How much stamina is lost is affected by several factors, such as the player class being used or the weapon currently being held. Smaller classes can move quicker and regenerate stamina faster, but they cannot run with heavy weapons or they will tire quickly. Larger classes, although much slower and bigger targets, can move with heavier weapons with more endurance. Players show signs of fatigue by decreased movement speed and heavy breathing, which clearly indicates to enemies nearby where that player is and his lack of stamina. If a player's stamina goes below zero, he will black out completely and fall to the ground unconscious for a short period of time. Certain weapons such as gas grenades are designed to do only stamina damage, as opposed to health. Stamina can only be regained by resting, obtaining a stamina powerup, or by being healed by the Light Infantry class's health grenades.

Instead of protecting the entire player universally, Gore's armor only protects specific areas of the body and must be destroyed before damage can be done again to the person in that area. The individual armor pickups consist of head armor, body armor, and right and left thigh leg armor which come together. There is also a gas mask which provides more protection than the regular head armor and also prevents the player from taking stamina damage from gas grenades.

There are five classes on each team: Light Infantry, Medium Infantry, Heavy Infantry, Snipers, and Mechanized Infantry, as well as the VIP class used only in Tactical modes. However, instead of each team having mirrored skills and appearances, each class has their own distinctive characteristics, including different abilities and weapons completely different from those of the team.

All health, stamina, weapon, and ammo pickups, either as part of the map's item layout or weapons dropped by slain players, can be shot and destroyed. The resulting explosion will damage anyone nearby.

Gore places the camera from which the player views directly on the character model, thus giving true perspective from the player's point of view such as emulating the arch of the back when looking up and down. This perspective creates many new tactics for battle, for example allowing players to accurately judge which parts of their body are exposed. This also lets players to see their own feet.

=== Multiplayer game types ===
- Deathmatch – players fight in a free-for-all battle to gain the most kills.
- Team Deathmatch – team-based variant of deathmatch.
- Capture the Flag – each team must defend their flag while trying to steal and capture the enemy flag. If a team steals the enemy flag but has also had their flag stolen, they cannot score until their flag has been recovered.
- Tactical – each team spawns with a set amount of weapons and ammo in their own base and must eliminate all other players on the other team. If a player dies, he must wait until the beginning of the next round before he can respawn. The round ends when all the players on one team have been killed or an objective in the current mode of Tactical has been completed. There are four modes of Tactical.
  - Extermination – the most common Tactical mode, each team must simply kill all other players on the opposing team.
  - Assault – one team starts with a target in their base which they must prevent from being destroyed. The opposing team spawns with a bomb satchel which, when planted and detonated, is capable of destroying the target in one large blast. However, the bomb satchel has a 30-second timer, which all players in the map are capable of hearing when armed, and the player with the detonator, which emits a loud ringing noise that easily draws attention, cannot switch to a regular weapon or the timer will stop. The target can also be destroyed by normal weapons, but this is mostly an impractical method as it is strong enough to withstand a great amount of damage.
  - Escape and Infiltration – one team starts with a VIP who must be escorted to a designated location within the map. If the VIP is killed, his team loses. The VIP class is very weak, spawning with no armor and incapable of using any weapons aside from the pistol. He also cannot be healed above 100 health points like all other classes.
- Co-operative – players join together as a team to play through an entire single-player campaign against the enemy AI. This mode was added in the 1.48 patch.
- Duel – two players fight in a 1-on-1 deathmatch while the others in the server wait and observe from a queue. When the round is over, the loser of the duel is sent to the end of the queue and the next player in line joins to play the winner. This mode was coded in by Gore player and programmer Red Daly and was subsequently included with the 1.50 patch.

== Reception ==
Reception

Aggregate score
Aggregator	Score
Metacritic	58/100

Review scores
Publication	Score
Computer Games Magazine	3/5
Computer Gaming World	1/5
Computer and Video Games	7/10
EP Daily	7.5/10
GameSpot	6.3/10
GameSpy	2.5/5
GameZone	8/10
IGN	8/10
PC Gamer (US)	46%
X-Play	2/5

The game received "mixed" reviews according to the review aggregation website Metacritic. GameSpot highlighted the exploding power-ups and their anti-camping effect on gameplay, but otherwise rated it as an average old-school shooter. The game was also praised by Greek magazine PC Master in 2003 which called it a "great old school shooter".

Gore sold 60,000 units according to 4D Rulers' website.

== Special Edition ==
On July 4, 2008, Gore: Special Edition was released to the public for free. The special edition includes graphical and gameplay tweaks.

== Notes ==
- Gore: Ultimate Soldier manual. 4D Rulers, 2002.
