= Perimeter 2: New Earth =

- Developer: KDV Games
- Publishers: RU: 1C Company; NA: Strategy First
- Composer: Johnny Kratong
- Platform: Microsoft Windows
- Release: RU: December 12, 2008; WW: February 10, 2009
- Genre: Real-time strategy
- Modes: Single-player, Multiplayer

Perimeter 2: New Earth (Russian: Периметр 2: Новая Земля), stylized as Perimeter II: New Earth, is a sequel to the 2004 real-time strategy video game, Perimeter, first released in 2008.

== Reception ==
Reception

Aggregate score
| Aggregator | Score |
|---|---|
| Metacritic | 43/100 |

Review scores
| Publication | Score |
|---|---|
| IGN | 5.1/10 |
| PC Gamer (UK) | 40% |
| PC Zone | 28% |

Despite the commercial success of its predecessor, Perimeter 2 was not a big success. The game received "generally unfavorable reviews" according to video game review aggregator Metacritic.
