= Pro Pinball: Timeshock! =

1997 video game

- Developer: Cunning Developments
- Publisher: Empire Interactive
- Series: Pro Pinball
- Platforms: MS-DOS, Windows, PlayStation, Mac OS
- Release: Windows, DOS: NA: October 1997; PlayStation: EU: February 1998; NA: August 28, 1998
- Genre: Pinball
- Modes: Single-player, multiplayer

Pro Pinball: Timeshock! is an pinball simulation video game developed by Cunning Developments and published by Empire Interactive for Microsoft Windows and PlayStation. It is the second game in the Pro Pinball series, and is themed around the concept of time travel.

A crowdfunded remake, Pro Pinball: Timeshock! - The ULTRA Edition was released in 2015 for mobile devices and in 2016 for computers.

== Theme and objectives ==
The inclusion of a time machine fixture on the table facilitates the game's time travel theme. At any one time the player is in one of a handful of time zones, the main ones being The Present Day, The Distant Future, Ancient Rome and The Prehistoric Age. Completion of certain objectives allows the player to travel between time zones (although some must be unlocked first, by means of completing secondary objectives).

Although the basic method of playing is persistent across time zones, the details of particular awards and objectives are themed towards the current time. For example, the player might be awarded with a ray gun in the future, whilst in the present day the player might be awarded with a magnet. This provides variety, and helps facilitate a wider set of goals.

== Gameplay ==
Like many pinball games, Pro Pinball: Timeshock! has features around the drains to give the player opportunity to "save" the ball. The left drain features an escape hatch back into the main play area, which, with a well timed nudge one can coerce the ball to travel through. The right drain features a "magno-save": an electromagnet placed just to the left of the right drain, activated by hitting a particular key. If used correctly, this either draws the ball out of the drain, or stops it before it gets there. However, if used recklessly, one can at worst "throw" the ball into the drain, or more likely, waste a good magno-save: Once used, the magno-save must be re-enabled by hitting a set of drop targets.

These features make Pro Pinball: Timeshock! much less of a game of chance. A skilled player can employ these techniques to extend ball times considerably.

== Development ==
Timeshock! is based on mid-1990s dot matrix display (DMD) pinball games.

== Reception ==
Reception

Aggregate score
Aggregator	Score
GameRankings	(PC) 85.50% (PS) 57.67%

Pro Pinball: Timeshock! received mixed to positive reviews. Aggregating review website GameRankings gave the PC version 85.50% based on 2 reviews and the PlayStation version 57.67% based on 3 reviews.

The editors of Computer Games Strategy Plus named Timeshock! the best traditional game of 1997.

In 1998, PC Gamer declared it the 49th-best computer game ever released, and the editors called it "a masterpiece that has obviously been designed by true flipper-mashing pinball fanatics".

== Physical table ==
In 2014, the Dutch company Silver Castle Pinball, announced that it had purchased the rights to produce a physical Timeshock! pinball machine. The original timeline estimated that the table would reach production in 2015. As of May 2018 the project is still ongoing with working prototypes having been built. Although the virtual/simulated Pro Pinball tables were designed using the principles of real-world pinball machines, in reality Silver Castle encountered several challenges making the table, especially the central feature of the time crystal. The company appears to be defunct; the website is down, their Twitter has been inactive since 2014, and their Facebook page has been inactive since 2017.

Artwork for the backglass and sides of the cabinet was created by Richard Benning under the direction of Jean-Paul de Win. The digital version used a different backglass, and had no cabinet artwork.
