= WildTangent =

American video game developer

Gamigo Inc.
- Trade name: WildTangent
- Type: Subsidiary
- Industry: Video games
- Founded: 1998; 28 years ago
- Founders: Alex St. John; Jeremy Kenyon
- Headquarters: Round Rock, Texas, US
- Key people: Jens Knauber (CEO)
- Products: See List of WildTangent games
- Parent: Gamigo (2019–present)
- Website: wildtangent.com

Gamigo Inc., doing business as WildTangent, is an American video game developer based in Round Rock, Texas. WildTangent was founded in 1998, and was acquired by the German games company Gamigo in April 2019.

== Games ==
Approximately 30 of the games in the WildTangent catalog were produced by the company's own WildTangent Game Studios. The rest of the games on the WildTangent game network are from other game developers and publishers. This includes games like Mall World which the company has represented to integrate major brands like Levi's.

== Criticism ==
Users have complained that the company's products have an adverse effect on their PC's performance or are intrusive to the user's experience. PC Magazine wrote in 2004 that although the WildTangent WebDriver was "not very" evil, some privacy complaints were justified as the program's user manual states that it may collect name, address, phone number, e-mail, and other contact information and could distribute the collected information with the user's consent. Concerns were also raised about the software's self-updating feature. In 2003, antispyware program Spybot classified WildTangent's original WebDriver as a potentially unwanted program.

In 2011, WildTangent challenged a patent infringement ruling against Hulu and itself by Ultramercial, LLC. Ultramercial contended that the two companies had violated its 2001 patent US 7346545, "Method and system for payment of intellectual property royalties by interposed sponsor on behalf of consumer over a telecommunications network", while WildTangent argued that the patent was too abstract. The Court of Appeals for the Federal Circuit upheld Ultramercial's patent, stating that it "does not simply claim the age-old idea that advertising can serve as currency. Instead [it] discloses a practical application of this idea." The court also asserted that the technical elements required to implement the system described were intricate enough to not be abstract. On June 21, 2013, after being ordered by the Supreme Court to re-examine the case, the Federal Circuit upheld its decision and ruled that Ultramercial's patents were valid. However, the 2014 Supreme Court ruling in Alice Corp. v. CLS Bank Int'l narrowed patent eligibility for software, and the Supreme Court subsequently sent Ultramercial's case back to the Federal Circuit. In November 2014, the Federal Circuit invalidated Ultramercial's patent in light of the ruling in Alice, undoing two of its own previous rulings and freeing WildTangent from liability.

== Genesis3D ==
WildTangent owns the Genesis3D game engine created by Eclipse Entertainment in 1997. The engine was announced on July 4, 1998. The first beta version was released on July 30, followed by release candidate 1 on March 2, 1999. The engine was free and open-source software under the "Eclipse" license, requiring companies to pay $10,000 to make closed source changes. In 1999, WildTangent acquired the assets for Genesis3D from Eclipse Entertainment to use for their web driver. While working on improving the engine's source code, Mark O'Hara and his team decided to instead create a new engine, Destiny3D, from the obtained knowledge. WildTangent then acquired Eclipse Entertainment in January 2002. Notable games developed using Genesis3D include the first-person shooter games Catechumen (2000) and its successor Ominous Horizons: A Paladin's Calling (2001), Ethnic Cleansing (2002), and Special Force (2003), as well as the action-adventure game Dragon's Lair 3D: Return to the Lair (2002).
