= Myst V: End of Ages =

2005 video game

- The PC box art shows the island Age, Noloben.
- Developers: Cyan Worlds; Beenox (Mac version)
- Publisher: Ubisoft
- Director: Rand Miller
- Producer: Mark Dobratz
- Designer: Ryan Miller
- Programmer: Mark H. DeForest
- Artists: Joshua A. Staub; Jason C. Baskett
- Composer: Tim Larkin
- Series: Myst
- Engine: Plasma 2.1
- Platforms: Windows, Mac OS X
- Release: NA: September 20, 2005; AU: September 22, 2005; EU: September 23, 2005
- Genre: Adventure
- Mode: Single-player

Myst V: End of Ages is a 2005 adventure video game and the fifth and final installment in the Myst series. The game was developed by Cyan Worlds, published by Ubisoft, and released for Macintosh and Windows PC platforms in September 2005. End of Ages's gameplay consists of navigating worlds known as "Ages" via the use of special books and solving puzzles in each Age. In a departure from previous titles in the series, End of Ages replaces pre-rendered graphics with worlds rendered in real-time, allowing players to freely navigate the Ages. Also new to the series are puzzles based around a species known as the Bahro, who respond to symbols carved into tablets. Control of the tablet, and thus the Bahro, is central to the game's story.

The faces of actors were digitally mapped onto three-dimensional character models to preserve realism. The game also includes multiple methods of navigation and an in-game camera.

End of Ages was positively received, despite complaints such as lessened interactivity compared to previous games and poorer graphics. After End of Ages's release, Cyan abruptly announced the end of software development and the layoff of most of its staff, but was able to rehire much of the development team a few weeks later after backing for a new project was secured.

== Gameplay ==
Myst V: End of Ages is an adventure game taking place in the first person. Players travel across several worlds known as "Ages", solving puzzles and gathering story clues by reading books or observing the environment. End of Ages offers players three navigation modes to explore. The first, "Classic mode", uses the same controls used in Myst and Riven; Ages are divided into locations of interest, or nodes, and the player's view is fixed at every node. Players advance to other nodes by clicking on portions of the screen. The "Classic Plus" mode uses the control scheme of Myst III: Exile and Myst IV: Revelation; movement is still node-based but players can rotate their view 360 degrees in any direction. The final navigation mode, known as "Free Look" or "Advanced" mode, allows players to navigate and observe the Ages freely, as in Uru: Ages Beyond Myst. The WASD keyboard keys are used for walking forward, backward, and sideways, while the mouse is used to change the player's point of view.

A new game mechanic to the series is the use of a slate found in all the Ages. These slates can be carved using the mouse to create shapes and symbols. The use of the slate is necessary to communicate with a shadowy race of creatures known as the Bahro. The Bahro understand certain symbols drawn on the slate and will respond to them; the creatures also retrieve the slate and return it to its original space if the player drops it. Slate symbols can cause environmental changes such as rain or wind, which may be necessary for solving puzzles. The slate cannot be carried everywhere, due to its size. For example, the player will have to leave the slate behind if they want to climb a ladder.

End of Ages has several features designed to help players complete puzzles. To recall clues or important items, players can use a camera feature to take screenshots, which are then placed in a journal the player can access at any time. Player interactions with other characters are similarly recalled via another journal; everything a character tells the player is stored and can be viewed at any time. Journal pages are narrated by the voice of the character, and missing pages of the journal appear translucent in menus.

== Plot ==
End of Ages takes place in the present day, sometime after the events of Uru: Ages Beyond Myst, and begins as the player responds to a letter from Atrus, who is a writer of special volumes called linking books, which serve as portals or links to worlds known as Ages. A linking book to the Age of Myst, the setting of the original game, lies sealed in the ruins of the ancient D'ni civilization. The D'ni had the ability to craft linking books, but their society crumbled from within; Atrus and his family have been trying to restore the D'ni people and created an Age for the survivors to live in, known as Releeshahn. Atrus by this period is an old man, mourning the deaths of his sons and wife. In his letter, Atrus expresses concern that his daughter, Yeesha, may be lost as well.

The player starts in Atrus' old study on K'veer, an island near the ruins of the main D'ni city; in the antechamber outside the study, there is a strange tablet locked in place on an altar. Yeesha links in and explains that legends state that in order to fully restore D'ni, someone known as the Grower must utilize the tablet. The artifact has the ability to fully control an enslaved race known as the Bahro. As Yeesha made the wrong decision upon unlocking the tablet, she can no longer use it; Yeesha instead charges the player with uncovering the tablet's power. After leaving Yeesha, the player meets a man named Esher near "the Great Shaft", which connects the D'ni to the surface. Esher is a survivor of the fall of D'ni and tells the player that Yeesha cannot be trusted, warning the player not to give her the Tablet. Throughout the Great Shaft, the player collects twelve fragments of Yeesha's journal. The writings appear to confirm Esher's warnings, as the narration seemingly indicates that Yeesha has descended into madness, believing herself to be the Grower.

At the urging of both Yeesha and Esher, the player travels across four Ages, collecting four slates that unlock the tablet's power. Esher occasionally appears in the Ages to offer his counsel, or reveal the histories of his people and the worlds the player explores. Once all four slates are collected, Esher requests that the player bring the tablet to him in the now-unlocked Age of Myst. The player is then returned to K'veer, where they have four possible choices. Travelling to Myst without the tablet will cause Esher to angrily abandon the player with no way out. If Esher is given the tablet, he will explain he wishes to use the tablet for domination before abandoning the player. If the player gives the tablet to Yeesha, the tablet simply slips through her hands and disappears into the ground; she walks away, disappointed, leaving the player trapped in D'ni. The only good ending involves giving the Bahro the tablet, ending their enslavement. Arriving at Releeshahn, Yeesha and Atrus thank the player and speak of a new chapter for the D'ni people; Esher is handed over to the Bahro to be punished for his crimes.

== Development ==
Robyn and Rand Miller, Myst's creators, had initially decided against creating sequels to 1997's Riven. The publishing rights to the series were later transferred to Ubisoft, who commissioned two sequels: Myst III: Exile and Myst IV: Revelation. Myst V: End of Ages was officially announced at the 2005 MacWorld Expo by Myst and Riven's developer, Cyan Worlds. In the announcement, Cyan stated that the game would be the final installment in the series.

Whereas most previous Myst titles had forgone 3D graphics rendered in real-time in favor of interactive prerendered environments, Rand Miller decided that technology had advanced to the point that End of Ages could use real-time graphics without sacrificing player immersion. "Over the years the Myst games have become increasingly sophisticated, culminating in Myst V, where we offer striking graphics that players can walk smoothly through", Miller stated in an interview. Miller emphasized that the goal of the game was still for players to become immersed in Myst's alternate worlds.

A focus in development was to make End of Ages more accessible than previous Myst games, which had often stymied uninitiated players with their puzzles. Learning from the control scheme used in another real-time Myst game (a remake of the original entitled realMyst), Cyan decided to develop multiple control methods to allow new players to quickly learn the controls, as well as provide a familiar interface for franchise veterans. Esher's experiences with the player's quest allowed a hint system to be built into the story. Miller wanted to make a significant change from previous games in the series, in that the player's actions decide the fate of the characters. When asked about the ending, Miller explained, "The future of civilization is down to this point, and the choices you make determine where it goes."

The original Myst games had used chroma key to insert live-action footage of actors into digital backgrounds. The models of End of Ages's characters were instead computer-generated, but Cyan did not want to lose the warmth and feeling provided by using live actors. Instead, Cyan developed a device mounted to the actors' faces that captured video of the actors while they spoke their lines. The video was then manipulated and used as a facial texture that was mapped onto the 3D characters, and the facial movement was also tracked and used to animate the faces of the characters in-game. Motion capture of the body was also used to ensure lifelike movement. Cyan staff were worried that the audio synching for animation would not be finished in time for the unveiling of the game at the Electronic Entertainment Expo (E3), but were happy with the end results. Critical reaction to game previews and impressions at E3 was highly positive. Miller was relieved, stating that when the mostly shooter game-dominated showcase declared that End of Ages might be the best game in the series, "That feels good".

=== Audio ===
Composer Tim Larkin, a sound designer and audio director at Cyan who had previously worked on realMyst and Uru: Ages Beyond Myst, was given the task of developing Myst V's musical score. Larkin stated that whereas earlier Myst games had been constrained by technological limitations, the available technology allowed End of Ages to have a more dynamic environment, with the music changing with various timings of different sound effects. Surround sound provided a more realistic and immersive gameplay experience. A major challenge in writing the music was that the score had to be flexible enough to match the non-linear gameplay events. "Games are totally interactive experiences", Larkin explained. "You don't guide a player through, since you can't count on being at a certain place at a certain time. I can't write cue music to get the player to do this, this and then this. One player might hear the cue and run the other way!" Larkin had to step away from what he had learned as a jazz composer and musician writing pieces with a definite beginning and end, instead creating music with "less arc" and less structure. Larkin admitted that some Myst fans would have preferred a musical style similar to Robyn Miller's scores for Myst and Riven, but replied by saying that change happens and players would find something to like in the new music if they kept an open mind.

Due to a tight budget, Larkin was unable to hire an orchestra to perform the music; all the instruments in the soundtrack, aside from Larkin's own trumpet playing, are sampled instruments. Larkin used a variety of synthesizers, samplers, and computers to create the score, working at his home studio and Cyan's offices. Larkin found that the biggest challenge with the score was finishing it on time for the game to ship. The soundtrack was released in CD format on October 25, 2005.

=== Release ===
End of Ages was packaged in two different retail versions for release in September 2005, to coincide with the 12th anniversary of the franchise's debut. A standard edition, containing only the game, was released for Windows-based PCs in a CD-ROM format. The limited edition contained the original soundtrack, a collector's lithograph, a strategy guide, and a bonus DVD with a "making of" retrospective on the Myst franchise. The video was made by GameTap, a subsidiary of Turner Broadcasting System; the behind-the-scenes feature was the first game-related documentary developed by Turner. The limited edition was shipped on hybrid Mac OS X/Windows DVDs, with Macintosh conversion provided by Quebec-based developer Beenox; this was the only commercial option for Macintosh players.

Shortly before End of Ages was released, Cyan announced the layoff of most of the staff and that the company would be ceasing software development. The reason for the sudden closure was a failure to gain financial backing for a new project after End of Ages's development. Part of the blame for the company's financial troubles was placed on the commercial disappointment of Uru: Ages Beyond Myst. The company was, according to Rand Miller, "able to pull a rabbit out of a hat" and rehire many of the employees a few weeks later after backing for a new project was secured. With the release of End of Ages, Cyan stated that their next game would have nothing to do with the Myst series. While pitching an unnamed online game to publishers, Cyan produced Cosmic Osmo's: Hex Isle with online content site Fanista.

After release, End of Ages placed sixth for the week of October 9 on NPD Techworld's sales rankings. In combination with the other games in the series, the franchise sold more than 12 million copies by November 2007.

== Reception ==
Reception

Aggregate scores
Aggregator	Score
GameRankings	80%
Metacritic	80/100

Review scores
Publication	Score
Computer Gaming World	3.5/5
Computer and Video Games	8.7
Eurogamer	60
GameSpot	7.9
IGN	8.8
PC Gamer (US)	68%

End of Ages was largely well received by critics. The game was judged a fitting end to the series. As with previous games, the visuals of End of Ages were widely praised. The switch to real-time rendering was generally seen as a positive step. The game's music was lauded; GameSpot's review noted the sparse use of music in End of Ages, but that was enough to set the proper tone for different Ages. A few reviewers, such as Charles Herold of the New York Times, felt that the graphics fell short of what was possible, especially compared to the prerendered visuals of Myst IV: Revelation. While Greg Kasavin of GameSpot felt that though the visuals were on par with previous games, End of Ages was missing several elements which made Myst IV more immersive: only important, story-driving items could be interacted with, for example, and the player makes no sounds, including footsteps, in the game.

The characters of Myst, occasionally ridiculed in previous games, were well received in End of Ages. Publications such as GameSpot and IGN praised the voice acting and the switch to character models; Juan Castro of IGN stated that though the player could not interact directly with the characters, the rendered characters wound up "feeling more genuine and real" than in previous games, speaking with genuine conviction and animation. Chad Sapieha in The Globe and Mail praised the characters' animations, and gestures. Likewise, Oliver Clare of Eurogamer praised the character animation, while noting they weren't quite as good as those found in Half Life 2, released the year before. Special praise was given by some reviewers to David Ogden Stiers for voicing the character of Esher.

Critics warmly received the addition of the slate and its related puzzles. Oliver Clare called the slate system a welcome addition to the Myst formula, although he felt that the recognition of symbols was occasionally too precise. Paul Presley of Computer and Video Games felt that the slate concept could have been explored further, while GameSpot enjoyed the environmental effects created by the slates.

Some reviewers were more critical of the game, and felt the game was too short and underwhelming with poor dialogue. PC gamer noted the short length as a negative, and called it "An underwhelming finale that's a must-buy for Myst completionists only." Both PC Gamer and Oliver Clare noted that players might find more action-orientated games more enjoyable, with PC Gamer citing Quake III as an alternative. The game's dialogue was also a point of contention for several reviewers. This opinion was presented by reviewer Marc Saltzman for Gannet News Service, who thought that players might become bored by the "overly dramatic" character dialogue. Oliver Clare called the dialogue and text "bland and vapid", and lacking in memorable phrases. PC Gamer also complained about the characters Esher and Yeesha making "maddeningly slow" speeches, speculating that the reasoning was to artificially inflate the game's length.

End of Ages won several awards upon release, including IGN's "editor's choice". Larkin's music was nominated under the "Best Interactive Score" category at the 2006 Game Audio Network Guild Awards, and won the 2006 Game Industry News award for best soundtrack. End of Ages was a nominee for GameSpot's 2005 "Best Adventure Game" award and IGN's prize for the year's top computer adventure game, but lost both categories to Fahrenheit.
