= David Wingrove =

British science fiction writer (born 1954)

- Born: 1 September 1954 (age 72); North Battersea, London
- Occupation: Author

David Wingrove (born 1 September 1954) is a British science fiction writer. He is well known as the author of the Chung Kuo novels. He is also the co-author (with Rand and Robyn Miller) of the three Myst novels.

== Personal life ==
Wingrove worked in the banking industry for seven years until he became fed up with it. He then attended the University of Kent, Canterbury, where he read English and American Literature.

He is married and, with his wife Susan, has four daughters: Jessica, Amy, Georgia, and Francesca.

In June 2026 he was diagnosed with Lewy body dementia with his wife stating it will be impossible to complete planned future works.

== Career ==
Between 1972 and 1982 he wrote over 300 unpublished short stories and 15 novels.

He started work on a new fictional project called A Perfect Art. Between 1984 and 1988, when it was first submitted, the title was changed twice, becoming first A Spring Day at the Edge of the World and then finally Chung Kuo, under which title it was sold to 18 publishers throughout the world. The Chung Kuo series ran to eight of nine planned volumes before the series was cancelled and the author had to prematurely finish the story in the eighth volume, which both he and readers found unsatisfying.

In 2008, Nicolas Cheetham at Quercus Publishing bought the rights to the series and planned an ambitious reprinting and repackaging of the sequence, 'recasting' it as eighteen shorter novels (including a radically re-written finale) and an all-new prequel novel, provisionally entitled When China Comes. Quercus Publishing abandoned the project after Mr. Cheetham left, but Mr. Cheetham reacquired it for his new publishers, Corvus Atlantic, in 2009. The reissuing of the series was planned to run from September 2010 to May 2014, commencing with the prequel novel, now retitled Son of Heaven. However, this was followed by news of a delay to Spring 2011 and the addition of a second prequel novel, Daylight on Iron Mountain.

Wingrove also has plans for further novels, including a first person character novel called Dawn in Stone City set in the Chung Kuo setting. He is also working on three novels, The Beast with Two Backs, Heaven's Bright Sun, and Roads to Moscow.

== Works ==
=== Chung Kuo ===
Original publication sequence (1989–1997):

1. The Middle Kingdom (1989)
2. The Broken Wheel (1990)
3. The White Mountain (1991)
4. The Stone Within (1992)
5. Beneath the Tree of Heaven (1993)
6. White Moon, Red Dragon (1994)
7. Days of Bitter Strength (1995)
8. The Marriage of the Living Dark (1997)

Corvus re-release (2010–2014):

1. Son of Heaven (2011)
2. Daylight on Iron Mountain (2011)
3. The Middle Kingdom (2012)
4. Ice and Fire (2012)
5. The Art of War (2013)
6. An Inch of Ashes (2013)
7. The Broken Wheel (2013)
8. The White Mountain (2014)

Fragile Books re-release (2017–present):

1. Son of Heaven (2017)
2. Daylight on Iron Mountain (2017)
3. The Middle Kingdom (2017)
4. Ice and Fire (2017)
5. The Art of War (2017)
6. An Inch of Ashes (2017)
7. The Broken Wheel (2017)
8. The White Mountain (2017)
9. Monsters of the Deep (2017)
10. The Stone Within (2018)
11. Upon a Wheel of Fire (2019)
12. Beneath the Tree of Heaven (2020)
13. Song of the Bronze Statue (2022)
14. White Moon, Red Dragon (2024)

=== Myst ===
- Myst: The Book of Atrus (Cyan / Hyperion)
- Myst: The Book of Ti'ana (Cyan / Hyperion)
- Myst: The Book of D'ni (Cyan / Hyperion)

=== Roads to Moscow ===
1. The Empire of Time (April 2014)
2. The Ocean of Time (March 2015)
3. The Master of Time (June 2016)

=== Nonfiction ===
- Trillion Year Spree: The History of Science Fiction (with Brian Aldiss)
