= Obduction (video game) =

2016 adventure video game

- Developer: Cyan Worlds
- Publisher: Cyan Worlds
- Director: Rand Miller
- Producer: Ryan Warzecha
- Designer: Rand Miller
- Artists: Stephan Martinière; Derrick Robinson
- Writer: Rand Miller
- Composer: Robyn Miller
- Engine: Unreal Engine 4
- Platforms: Windows macOS; PlayStation 4 Xbox One
- Release: Windows; August 24, 2016 macOS; March 30, 2017; PlayStation 4 August 29, 2017; Xbox One; April 10, 2020
- Genre: Adventure
- Mode: Single-player

Obduction is an adventure video game developed by Cyan Worlds. Obduction is considered a spiritual successor to Cyan's previous adventure games, Myst and Riven. In the game, the player finds their character transported to strange alien worlds but with human elements within the settings. The player must explore and solve puzzles to figure out how to return home.

The game was funded via a Kickstarter campaign in October 2013, and was released in August 2016 for Windows-based PCs, with a macOS version released in March 2017. A virtual reality version for Oculus Rift system was published in November 2016, while HTC Vive and Oculus Touch versions were released on March 22, 2017. The PlayStation 4 version was launched in August 2017 with a patch arriving shortly afterwards to support PlayStation VR. The Xbox One version of the game was released on April 10, 2020. The game was made available for Amazon Luna on October 20, 2020.

== Gameplay ==
In Obduction, the player's character has been abducted from Earth by aliens and transported to one of several alien worlds, with the goal of trying to find a way home. The game, played out as an adventure game from the first-person perspective, has the player exploring the environment of several different worlds, which includes a mix of alien landscapes and familiar human settings, solving puzzles, and making decisions that can influence how the game ends. The game features traditional navigation controls for first-person games as well as a node-based point and click system. Many objects in the game can be selected and examined in a full three-dimensional view, allowing the player to discover possible hidden drawers or features that aid in puzzle solving.

== Plot ==
Within Obduction, small spheres of human environments, such as a portion of this house and the land in front of it, have been transported to an alien environment, and players must solve puzzles that mix the human and alien elements.

The player, while at a campground, sees strange lights in the sky. One light resolves into a seed-like object that immobilizes the player and transports them and a small sphere of the park to an alien world, within the confines of a much larger sphere of Earth taken from an early-20th century Arizona mining town. They can see the alien world outside of this larger sphere, but cannot pass through it. Exploring the town, they find it seemingly empty outside of holographic pre-recorded welcoming messages from its mayor Josef Janssen (Patrick Treadway). Further exploration reveals that the town is called Hunrath, and that dozens of humans from across the 19th-21st centuries had been brought here, in the same manner the player was, for unknown reasons.

From journals left by some of these people, the player learns that there are four such spheres or "cells", linked via Trees in the center of each cell to a common Heart. The Trees periodically drop Seeds that travel through time and space and swap spherical areas from one linked world with another. The humans had peacefully worked with alien species from the other worlds to understand this process: the technologically advanced Mofang from the planet Soria, the insect-like Arai species from Kaptar, and the peaceful Villein species from Maray. The four species found ways to harness the Seeds to transfer themselves between their worlds at will, allowing for collaboration and to try to find a means home. However, the player finds they had just arrived after a major conflict. The Mofang felt the other species were holding them back, and developed a weapon of mass destruction capable of devastating the other spheres. Friendly Mofang warned the other species, and they instituted various lockdown protocols to slow the Mofang from planting these weapons. Most then took shelter through cryogenic hibernation in a Villein "Silo". One human, C.W. (Robyn Miller), opted to stay behind in Hunrath and isolated himself in a safe room, believing the others were dead. He implores the player to help provide water to each Tree in the four cells and restart the power systems in Hunrath to allow him to return them back to Earth.

As the player explores the worlds, they learn that the species had developed a plan to swap the Mofang WMDs back to Soria when the Mofang swapped them over to the individual cells. The Arai were successful in this plan and sent one of the weapons back to Soria just before it detonated, wiping out most of the Mofang. From the Soria cell, the player observes the Arizona desert outside it, but it appears as a post-apocalyptic wasteland, inferring that returning the Hunrath cell to Earth would be a bad, if not terrible, decision. Eventually, the player approaches the Silo in Maray. They find one of the Mofang weapons, which if they approach, detonates and kills everyone in Maray, ending the game. Otherwise, they disable the weapon and start the process of waking the sleeping residents, including Farley (Caroline Fowler), a major character and former mayor of Hunrath.

With all the Trees watered and power restored, C.W. begins the process of returning Hunrath to Earth. At this point, the player has the option to follow a hunch from Farley's journal and disable the battery this process depends on. If they do not interfere, C.W. returns them to Earth, but in the same devastated landscape that was seen from the Soria cell. Farley, who swapped back to Hunrath before it returned to Earth, condemns C.W. because most of the humans had not yet been able to swap back, and those that were are now forced to survive in this inhospitable environment. Alternatively, if the player disables the battery, C.W. starts the swap and soon realizes something is wrong but cannot stop the process. The Hunrath cell, as well as the other three cells, swap to a lush, green planet, the barrier surrounding each one having vanished so that the species can leave and inhabit this new world. Farley tells C.W. that the other humans and alien allies have all made it and that there is great opportunity on this new planet.

== Development ==
Following the release of Myst Online: Uru Live, Cyan's team began discussing what their next project should be, debating between another work in the Myst franchise, or an entirely new property. They opted for the latter option, as it would give them more freedom to create and not be limited by their established canon for Myst, though would risk alienating fans of the Myst series. Following its announcement and Kickstarter, the team discovered that fans were very open to the new direction, showing great interest in Cyan's puzzle and adventure approaches.

Obduction was formally announced on October 17, 2013, via a Kickstarter campaign headed by Cyan co-founder and CEO Rand Miller. The basic goal was set at US$1.1 million. Though Cyan had estimated it would take around $2.5 million to complete Obduction, they set a lower goal as to avoid appearing greedy, according to Miller, hoping to bring in at least a multiple of the initial request. In the accompanying video, Miller states that the video game is intended to serve as the spiritual successor to Myst and Riven. Taking inspiration from his earlier material, Miller remarked that the setting of a mysterious alien world would parallel the beginning experience of Myst. Noting that the announcement comes twenty years since the release of Myst, Miller emphasized that collaborators from the original two Myst games, as well as those who assisted in developing Uru: Ages Beyond Myst, would have a hand in Obduction's development. The campaign ended on November 16, surpassing the stretch goal of US$1.3 million, meaning that the game will also have support for the Oculus Rift. Though they did not bring as much as they desired, the success of the Kickstarter allowed them to engage with other funding mechanisms as to assure completion of the game.

Internally, the game was developed with the mantra of "Myst in space"; comparable to Myst's Ages, the player explores different alien worlds, with means to travel back and forth between them similar to the Linking books. Though they initially wanted to move away from being too Myst-like, treating the title as a spiritual successor, they found that during development they were naturally brought back to structuring the game similar to Myst. The game includes three non-player characters (NPCs), which originally were planned to be rendered and animated within the game's engine, but by March 2015, Cyan decided to return to the use of full-motion video of live actors that will be incorporated into the game, in the same manner as they used in Riven, with Miller considering that it was part of Cyan's legacy to be able to use this approach.

Robyn Miller, who composed the soundtracks for Myst and Riven before leaving Cyan, returned to work on Obduction's soundtrack and appear as an NPC in live action sequences. Rand had reached out for Robyn's help late in the project's development, and the two recounted their earlier success during this. The two are considering a future project they would fully collaborate on together.

Though the game was anticipated to be out in 2015, production delays pushed the game into a 2016 release. In March 2016, alongside a teaser-trailer, Cyan announced the game would be available in June 2016. Cyan later pushed the release by a month to July 26, 2016, citing a major Unreal Engine update as one reason for the postponement; the extra time enabled them to implement a virtual reality version for Oculus Rift systems. About a week before this new date, Cyan announced one final release pushback until the week of August 22, 2016, stating that there were some last-minute bugs that arose during new gameplay systems added in the latest development cycles. The game was officially released on August 24, 2016, though the Oculus version remained in development at this point.

The Oculus version was released on October 31, 2016. For this version, Cyan was well-aware of issues with motion sickness associated with fully immersive games, more so for their larger spaces they created for Obduction. To get around this, they decided to allow the player to control their movement using a gamepad, following a waypoint system similar to the original Myst, so that the player would appear to teleport to the nearby point rather those shown moving towards it and eliminate the motion sickness. Cyan plans to incorporate the Oculus Touch controls. Cyan also has stated they plan to use their experience from developing the VR on Obduction onto new projects, noting that while a VR version of the original Myst is of high demand, they have their own unique ideas they would like to explore. Cyan announced plans for release on two other VR units, the PlayStation VR and the HTC Vive; with the former, this also enabled them to develop a version for the PlayStation 4, which will be their first console release for the game. The HTC Vive version was released on March 22, 2017, while the non-VR version for the PlayStation 4 will be released on August 29, 2017, with the patch for VR support to arrive at a later date. A version for Amazon Luna was released for October 20, 2020.

== Reception ==
Reception

Aggregate score
Aggregator	Score
Metacritic	PC: 76/100; PS4: 61/100

Review scores
Publication	Score
Adventure Gamers	4.5/5
Destructoid	9/10
Game Informer	7.25/10
GameRevolution	1/5
GameSpot	7/10
PC Gamer (US)	76/100
Polygon	8.5/10

Obduction received "favorable" reviews, according to review aggregator Metacritic.

Caitlin Cook of Destructoid gave the game a score of 9/10, writing that "For what it sets out to do, it does it pretty perfectly". Noah Caldwell-Gervais of Polygon gave the game a score of 8.5/10. He stated that "Cyan succeeded in making another adventure that feels truly timeless."

On the other hand, Jed Whitaker of Game Revolution gave the game a score of 1 out of 5 stars, writing that the game had several bugs and ran poorly with long loading times and framedrops on the high-end computer used. Whitaker also considered many of the puzzles to be outdated when compared to other modern adventure games such as Firewatch and Oxenfree.
