= Cyan Worlds =

American video game developer

Coordinates: 47°47′27″N 117°21′15″W

Cyan, Inc.
- Trade name: Cyan Worlds
- Formerly: Cyan Productions (1997–2002)
- Type: Private company
- Industry: Video games
- Founded: 1987
- Founder: Rand Miller; Robyn Miller
- Headquarters: Mead, Washington, United States
- Key people: Rand Miller (CEO and co-founder)
- Products: The Manhole; Cosmic Osmo and the Worlds Beyond the Mackerel; Spelunx; Myst series Obduction; Firmament
- Subsidiaries: Cyan Ventures
- Website: cyan.com

Cyan, Inc., doing business as Cyan Worlds, is an American video game developer and publisher based in Mead, Washington. Founded by brothers Rand and Robyn Miller in 1987, the company created the Myst series.

Myst became the best-selling PC game ever made when it was released in 1993, and remained so for several years afterwards. It spawned several sequels, including Riven and the massively multiplayer online adventure Myst Online: Uru Live. Before Myst, the company created children's games such as The Manhole. In 2016, it released the Kickstarter-funded game Obduction and in 2023, it released Firmament, also funded with Kickstarter.

As of 2024, Cyan is the oldest surviving independent game studio in the United States.

== History ==
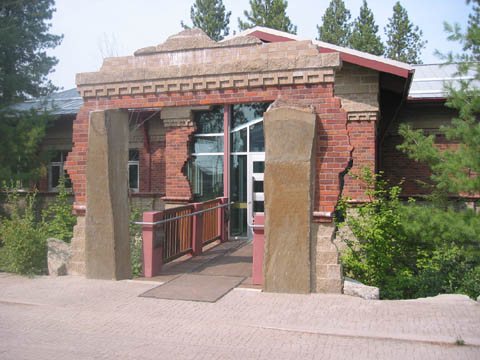
Cyan Worlds front entrance

=== Pre-Myst (1987–1992) ===
Cyan was founded in 1987 by brothers Rand and Robyn Miller, operating out of their parents' basement in their Spokane, Washington home. Rand had been programming games as a junior high school student in the 1980s, while Robyn studied music and arts in high school. The two found a common ground through the Macintosh Hypercard development program which allowed them to mix their talents together. Cyan originally produced adventure games for children. The company's early titles, The Manhole (1988), Cosmic Osmo and the Worlds Beyond the Mackerel (1989) and Spelunx (1991) were whimsical fantasy adventures for a young audience. The games offered numerous graphical screens with puzzles, mini-games and activities. Some of these titles were early forays of Cyan into both construction of interactive worlds using HyperCard and the CD-ROM medium, both of which would later be used for Myst.

=== Myst, Riven and sequels (1993–2004) ===
In 1993, Cyan shot to worldwide fame with the release of Myst, a 3D pre-rendered adventure game aimed at an older audience unlike its previous games. Myst was one of the earliest CD-ROM games during a time when CD-ROM drives were beginning to become mainstream. The title sold more than six million copies and was the best-selling PC game ever, until The Sims exceeded Myst sales in 2002.

With the revenue from Myst, Cyan rebranded as Cyan Productions and quickly moved to a new headquarters to accommodate a bigger staff, where it remains today. During this time, three novels set in the Myst universe were co-authored by the Millers and David Wingrove. The sequel to Myst, Riven, was released in 1997. After its release, Robyn opted to leave Cyan to pursue other interests, primarily working on independent film production. In a 1999 interview, Robyn stated that the reason for his departure was that "Two people can't pilot a ship – someone must be in charge...The parting gave us each a ship."

The next eight years saw a huge amount of expansion in the Myst franchise, both from within and outside of Cyan. While the publishing rights were transferred from Broderbund to Mattel, and then to Ubisoft, Cyan prepared for the next game in the Myst universe, which was to be a massively multiplayer online game, and not a direct sequel to Myst. During this time, the company started going by the name "Cyan Worlds, Inc.". Partly as a test of its new real-time 3D engine, Cyan released realMyst in 2000, a complete recreation of the original Myst game. At the same time, the next Myst game, Myst III: Exile, was developed by Presto Studios and published by Ubisoft, and released in 2001.

In 2003, Cyan announced that its multiplayer adventure, Uru, formerly known under the working titles DIRT ("D'ni In Real Time"), Mudpie ("Multi-User DIRT – Persistent Interactive Environment"), Parable and Myst Online, would be split into separate single-player and multiplayer components, at the request of the publisher Ubisoft. The single-player component, Uru: Ages Beyond Myst, was released later that year. The multiplayer component, Uru Live had a short beta test, but was cancelled before being officially released.

=== Uru and the return of Uru Live (2004–2007) ===
Cyan Worlds logo (2003 – June 2013)

In 2004, Cyan released two Uru expansion packs (To D'ni and The Path of the Shell) that included content originally intended for the online component. The same year, Ubisoft independently developed and released Myst IV: Revelation, the second game in the series not developed by Cyan. In the following year, Cyan developed the final chapter in the Myst series, Myst V: End of Ages. After Myst V, the company laid off most of its employees due to financial difficulties, but shortly after rehired almost everyone after negotiating a deal with Turner Broadcasting. Prior to this, the company was working on an as yet unannounced project (reportedly named Latus by Richard A. Watson) and negotiating with an undisclosed publisher, but its status is now unclear, though Rand Miller made mention of it in August 2011 and confirmed its name as Latus.

After Uru Live closed, fans began developing their own server software. In response to this demand, Cyan Worlds released Untìl Uru in late 2004, a modified version of the client and server software of Live. This version of the game was unsupported – servers were owned and operated by fans, and no new content was provided. Later, through funding by GameTap, Cyan managed to offer the "D'mala" shard, an official game server. Fans also began developing new content for the game, in an unofficial context.

In 2006, Rand Miller announced that Uru Live would return in full capacity using GameTap-hosted servers and funding. Cyan staff were re-hired and production of new Uru content began.

==== Additional releases ====
On November 30, 2007, Cyan released Cosmic Osmo's Hex Isle via the online service Fanista. This marked the return of the Cosmic Osmo character after 15 years.

In August 2009, it was announced that Cyan Worlds would be working with Creative Kingdoms to create an online version of their MagiQuest virtual reality game. MagiQuest Online makes use of the Plasma engine used in Myst Online: Uru Live.

=== The decline of the Uru era (2007–2011) ===
Myst Online: Uru Live launched officially on GameTap on February 15, 2007, after being available through GameTap as an open beta for a few months. This was the most successful incarnation of Uru, finally achieving the original goal of supported online play, with ongoing content releases. Despite this success, GameTap announced on February 4, 2008, that it would be closing Uru Live. Game servers remained online for 60 days following, and were finally shut down on April 10, 2008.

On June 30, 2008, it was announced that Cyan Worlds had regained the rights to Uru, and had plans to relaunch it under the name Myst Online: Restoration Experiment. Cyan no longer has funds available for further development on the game, and instead intends to release the code for the servers, client and tools as open-source software, and rely on user-generated content for expansion.

In November 2008, "Cyan Test" (a third "Cyan" company created to provide testing services) laid off about 50 game testers. The layoffs came as a result of the acquisition of its primary customer Gamecock Media.

In February 2010, Cyan took steps towards opening up Uru, with the launch of a new Myst Online: Uru Live server (dubbed "MOULagain" by fans) with access to all of the Ages of Uru. They made the client software available free of charge and began accepting donations. As of April 2014, over 128,000 accounts had been created.

On April 6, 2011, Cyan released the source code to the URU client as well its development tools.

=== Obduction (2013–2018) ===
On October 17, 2013, Rand Miller announced a new video game designed as a spiritual successor to Myst and Riven called Obduction. The game received $1.3 million in funding from Kickstarter support. Obduction takes place on an alien planet where humans and portions of their environment have been transported, and features puzzles that involve the combination of human technology with alien ones. Obduction's world is fully rendered within the Unreal Engine and explorable from the first-person view, though uses full-motion video for some non-player characters. Rand got Robyn's help to create the soundtrack as well as act as one of the non-player characters in the game. The game was officially released on August 24, 2016, for Microsoft Windows and OS X, and later for Oculus Rift. Obduction received favorable reviews from critics, comparing as a worthy successor to Cyan's Myst games.

=== Firmament (2018–2023) ===
On March 1, 2018, Cyan announced Firmament, which it described as "a new VR experience", though will also be available for standard displays. Like Obduction, Cyan launched a Kickstarter on March 26, 2018, to raise funding for the game. The Kickstarter was successful, securing versions of the game for Microsoft Windows, macOS, and PlayStation 4/PlayStation VR systems. Firmament was released on May 18, 2023.

=== Remakes and re-releases (2018–present) ===
On April 9, 2018, to celebrate the 25th anniversary of the original Myst, Cyan announced via Kickstarter that it had acquired the legal rights to Exile and Revelation and were re-releasing the entire series, including the complete Uru and realMyst: Masterpiece Edition, on both DVD-ROM and digital download on GOG.com and Steam. Cyan has also worked with GOG.com to upgrade all of the games in the franchise to full compatibility with modern Windows operating systems. The Kickstarter campaign included a number of specific perks (such as a "working" Myst Linking Book with LED screen as the box for the physical copies of the games) for the anniversary editions, which would ship in November 2018. The pledged goal for the Kickstarter campaign was US$247,500 before May 24; this initial goal was attained within eight hours, and within two weeks, the amount of donations exceeded $1 million. The campaign closed on May 24 at $2,810,127, over 1100% of the pledged goal, with 19,304 backers. Exile and Revelation, along with updated versions of the other games of the series, appeared on GOG.com and Steam in Summer/Fall 2018.

On September 16, 2020, Cyan announced Myst, a VR remake which it described as "the definitive version" of the original game, though it will also be available for standard displays. Myst uses Unreal Engine 4 and was released as a timed exclusive for the Oculus Quest December 10, 2020, followed by a Windows, macOS, Xbox Series X/S and Xbox One version on August 26, 2021.

Cyan let go of about twelve employees, roughly half of its staff, by the end of March 2025 due to the costs of development.

== Technology ==
CyanWorlds.com Engine (formerly Plasma) is a real-time 3D game engine originally called Headspin and developed by Headspin Technologies in 1997 and later by Cyan Worlds (Cyan purchased the engine as part of the acquisition of Headspin) to power the next generation of real time 3D Myst series games such as Uru: Ages Beyond Myst and Myst V: End of Ages. Cyan Worlds and OpenUru.org Foundry jointly announced open source delivery of the "CyanWorlds.com Engine" client and 3ds Max plugin, aka Plasma engine 2.0, the engine used to power Myst Online: Uru Live. In 2014, Cyan released realMyst: Masterpiece Edition, a remake version of realMyst, using the Unity engine instead of Plasma.

== Games developed ==
=== D'ni universe ===
Most of Cyan's titles (those in the Myst and Uru series) tell the story of a humanoid race called the D'ni, who have the ability to write linking books. Linking books teleport the user into other worlds, limited only by the imagination of the author. These worlds are referred to as "Ages." Related to the storyline of the D'ni are three Myst novels: The Book of Atrus, The Book of Ti'ana and The Book of D'ni. (Due to not being developed in-house by Cyan, Exile and Revelation were not included in this list.)

Title	Release year	Publisher
Myst	1993	Broderbund
Riven	1997	Red Orb Entertainment
realMyst	2000	Mattel Interactive
Uru: Ages Beyond Myst	2003	Ubisoft
Uru: To D'ni	2004	Ubisoft
Uru: The Path of the Shell	2004	Ubisoft
Untìl Uru	2004	Self-published
Myst V: End of Ages	2005	Ubisoft
Myst Online: Uru Live	2007	GameTap
Myst (for iPhone and iPod Touch)	2009	Self-published
Myst Online: Uru Live again	2010	Self-published
Riven (for iPhone and iPod Touch)	2010	Self-published
realMyst (for iOS)	2012	Self-published
Riven (for iPad)	2013	Self-published
realMyst: Masterpiece Edition	2014	Self-published
Myst (full 3D remake)	2020	Self-published
Riven (full 3D remake)	2024	Self-published

=== Other games ===
Title	Release year	Publisher
The Manhole (on floppy disc)	1988	Self-published
The Manhole (on CD-ROM)	1989	Activision
Cosmic Osmo and the Worlds Beyond the Mackerel	1989	Broderbund
Spelunx and the Caves of Mr. Seudo	1991	Broderbund
The Manhole: Masterpiece Edition	1994	Broderbund
Cosmic Osmo's Hex Isle	2007	Fanista
MagiQuest Online	2010	Creative Kingdoms
The Manhole: Masterpiece Edition (for iOS)	2010	Self-published
Stoneship (for iPhone, iPod Touch, and iPad)	2010	Self-published
Bug Chucker (for iPhone, iPod Touch, iPad, and Android)	2011	Self-published
Obduction	2016	Self-published
Firmament	2023	Self-published

== Games published ==
Cyan announced in November 2018 the formation of a new publishing label, Cyan Ventures, to publish games for virtual reality and other platforms. Rand Miller said of the label, "Like with Myst, we know we are on the edge of something...VR has a magical feel, where it takes you to another place. It still feels like we need to push it forward. We are saying let's take the ball and help define this medium." One title from Cyan Ventures is ZED from Eagre Games, a studio formed by former Cyan developer Chuck Carter, released June 4, 2019.

Title	Release year	Developer
ZED	2019	Eagre Games
Unwritten	2020	Inkworks
AREA MAN LIVES	2022	Numinous Games
The Last Clockwinder	2022	Pontoco

== List of people related to Cyan ==
- Rand Miller, co-founder and CEO
- Robyn Miller, co-founder and former designer/director
- Richard Vander Wende, former designer/director
- Tim Larkin, former sound designer/composer
- Maclaine Diemer, composer for Firmament
- Martin O'Donnell, sound designer for Riven

== See also ==
- Myst novels
