= Cosmic Osmo and the Worlds Beyond the Mackerel =

1990 video game

- Developer: Cyan Worlds
- Publisher: Cyan Worlds
- Platforms: Macintosh, Microsoft Windows
- Release: June 21, 1990
- Genre: Adventure
- Mode: Single-player

Cosmic Osmo and the Worlds Beyond the Mackerel is a graphic adventure computer game for the Macintosh computer line (Plus, SE, SE/30, II Series, Classic, LC) created by Cyan, Inc. It was published in 1989 and won the 1990 Mac User's Editors' Choice Award for the "Best Recreational Program" category.

Spelunx, Cyan's next title, was made with a similar style of gameplay. In 2007, a new Cosmic Osmo game titled Cosmic Osmo's: Hex Isle was released, based loosely on the original's setting but with a more traditional platform game style of gameplay.

== Game mechanics ==
The game features a point-and-click interface. The player clicks on various elements in a scene to trigger events. To move between scenes and rooms, the player clicks on doors or near the edge of the screen.

The game begins when the player enters an animated spaceship hovering in front of the title screen. While inside the ship, he can trigger various events.

The spaceship gives the player the ability to visit various planets. Aside from using the ship to move between planets, a complex network of shortcuts exists between planets and scenes. The game, being presented in first-person view, enables shifts from the macroscopic to the microscopic level. Most of the shortcuts are found at the microscopic level: through a water drain or a mouse-hole, for example.

== Development ==
Cosmic Osmo was created by brothers Rand and Robyn Miller, who went on to form the company Cyan and develop the best-selling adventure game Myst.

It was created, and runs, using HyperCard. Animated portions were made using MacroMind VideoWorks, a linear animation program that later became Macromedia Director. An XCMD plug-in enabled VideoWorks animated sprites to be displayed with an alpha mask on top or behind HyperCard's graphic layer.

It was first published as simply Cosmic Osmo and required a hard drive for installation. A later enhanced CD-ROM version added more worlds, sounds, and music, and was titled Cosmic Osmo and the Worlds Beyond the Mackerel. Both versions were originally published by Activision, but through a breach of contract the rights reverted back to Cyan.

Mark H. DeForest (software engineer and later CTO at Cyan) in December 1995 indicated a colorized version was in development, noting, "...[it] is taking a fair amount of work, but is looking like it will be well worth it."

A port of the game was reportedly developed for the SNES-CD, a video game console add-on that was never released. Consequently, the game was not released either.

In May 2007, a company called HyperActive Software announced that they had been contracted by Cyan to create a Windows version of the game, to be released via GameTap, which was released on June 19, 2008.

On August 4, 2010 the game became available for purchase through Steam as part of a bundle that also includes the other Cyan Worlds titles The Manhole: Masterpiece Edition, Myst: Masterpiece Edition, realMyst, Riven: The Sequel to Myst, URU: Complete Chronicles, and Spelunx and the Caves of Mr. Seudo. Originally only available for Macintosh computers, Cosmic Osmo is now only for Windows PC systems.

== Goals and artistic design ==
Cosmic Osmo has a style of gameplay similar to Cyan's previous game, The Manhole. There is no goal, no system of scoring points, and no items for players to keep in inventory. Players can be said to have "finished" the game if they have explored every area and found every secret, but the game gives no feedback to indicate whether this has happened. Although this is unconventional, it allows finding new secrets to be a genuine surprise, while avoiding the frustration of endlessly searching the game for the last secret to achieve 100% completion.

Although Osmo was often considered to be a children's game, it was never advertised as such, and people of all ages have declared themselves fans. The game has a humorous tone, and popular culture references abound. For example, one object the player can find is an album by a band called "Swabs N' Roses", a reference to Guns N' Roses.

== Music and sound ==
The game features digitized voices and sounds that were played by HyperCard's sound commands, and 18 tracks of original CD-DA background music on the Hybrid CD version, much of which was written by Shep Lovick and Robyn Miller and features Kyle Stroud prominently on the saxophone.

== Sequel ==
A sequel to Cosmic Osmo called Cosmic Osmo's Hex Isle was released on November 30, 2007. Hex Isle was sold exclusively through a website called Fanista Beta, and works on Windows and Intel Macs. Fanista later went out of business and the game was discontinued.

Cyan Worlds mentioned nothing of the game before its release. The game draws on the universe and style of its predecessor, but is a puzzle-solving platform game instead of a click-through adventure.
