= Myst III: Exile =

2001 video game

- The box art shows the main hub Age, J'nanin.
- Developer: Presto Studios
- Publishers: Ubi Soft (physical); Cyan Worlds (digital)
- Director: Phil Saunders
- Producers: Michel Kripalani; Greg Uhler
- Programmer: Roland Gustafsson
- Writer: Mary DeMarle
- Composer: Jack Wall
- Series: Myst
- Platforms: Mac OS, Windows, PlayStation 2, Xbox
- Release: Mac OS, Windows: NA: May 8, 2001; EU: September 7, 2001; PlayStation 2, Xbox: NA: September 19, 2002; EU: October 4, 2002
- Genre: Graphic adventure
- Mode: Single-player

Myst III: Exile is a 2001 graphic adventure game developed by Presto Studios and published by Ubi Soft and Cyan Worlds. It is the third title in the Myst series, following 1997's Riven. The game was originally released on four compact discs for both Mac OS and Microsoft Windows on May 8, 2001; versions for the Xbox and PlayStation 2 were released in late 2002. A single-disc DVD version was later released for Windows and Mac OS. The player assumes the role of a friend of Atrus. A member of the D'ni race, Atrus can create links to other worlds called Ages by writing descriptive books. In Exile, Atrus has written an Age for the D'ni to live on while rebuilding their civilization. The book is stolen by a mysterious figure; the player pursues the thief in an attempt to reclaim Atrus' tablet.

The creators of the Myst franchise gave the task of creating the third game in the series to Presto Studios, known for its adventure game series The Journeyman Project. Presto sought to develop a diverse and logical approach to puzzles and Ages, and worked to make the villain sympathetically multifaceted. The developers hired Jack Wall to develop a musical style different from earlier composer Robyn Miller but still recognizable as a Myst game. The project required millions of U.S. dollars and more than two years to complete.

Exile was well received by critics; The Daily Telegraph called it the best game in the Myst series. Despite selling more than a million copies within the first year of release, Exile performed worse commercially than Myst and Riven. Myst IV: Revelation, the fourth game in the series, was developed and published solely by Ubisoft.

== Gameplay ==
An example of gameplay in the Amateria Age of Myst III: Exile. Items such as journals are accessible along the bottom edge of the screen.

Gameplay in Myst III: Exile is similar to that of its predecessors. The player explores immersive, pre-rendered environments known as "Ages" by using either mouse clicks or the space bar for movement from set nodes across each Age. Unlike previous games, which employed a series of still images, Exile uses a "free look" system which gives the player a 360-degree field of view at each node. The game also has an optional "zip" mode to rapidly cross explored terrain by skipping nodes. Clicking allows the player to manipulate objects and pick up items. The on-screen cursor changes to show contextual actions.

Each of the game's Ages has a distinctive look and theme. Players begin their journey on the Age of J'nanin, which acts as a hub linking to other Ages and as a "lesson Age" demonstrating important principles for later puzzles. Three of these Ages are Amateria, a mechanical Age in the middle of a vast sea; Edanna, a world of preserved nature, with abundant plant and animal life; and Voltaic, a dusty island riddled with contraption-filled canyons.

By gathering clues and manipulating the environment, the player solves thematically linked puzzles. For example, the book leading to Voltaic is accessed by aligning beams of light across a canyon; the Age itself contains similar energy-based puzzles. Edanna's plant-filled puzzles require manipulation of the Age's ecosystem. Puzzles often involve observing interactions between elements of the environment, then adjusting the links between them. The player can also pick up and view journals or pages written by game characters which reveal back-story and give hints to solving puzzles. Cursor Mode allows the player to select items from a personal inventory at the bottom of the screen.

== Plot ==
Exile begins ten years after the events of Riven, when the player arrives at Tomahna, the home of Atrus and his wife Catherine. Atrus is a scientist and explorer who has mastered an ancient practice known as the Art: he can create links to different Ages by writing special books. This ability was developed by an ancient civilization known as the D'ni, whose society crumbled after the D'ni city was devastated by a plague. Atrus calls the player to his home to display his newest Age, Releeshahn, which Atrus has designed as a new home for the D'ni survivors.

As Atrus and the player prepare to leave for Releeshahn, a mysterious man appears in Atrus' study and sets it on fire, stealing the Releeshahn book. Following the thief via the book he left behind, the player arrives at J'nanin, an Age that Atrus had written long before as a way to teach the Art to his sons. Because the fire has caused considerable damage to the J'nanin book, Atrus cannot accompany the player.

The thief is named Saavedro. Twenty years earlier, Atrus' wayward sons Sirrus and Achenar destroyed Saavedro's home Age of Narayan and trapped him on J'nanin. Saavedro believes his family is dead and swears vengeance on Atrus, unaware that Atrus has imprisoned his sons for their crimes and that Saavedro's family is still alive. The game can end several ways depending on the player's actions. In the most ideal scenario, Saavedro returns to Narayan peacefully after giving back the book of Releeshahn. Other endings result in Saavedro destroying Releeshahn or killing the player; another option allows the player to leave Saavedro trapped forever.

== Development ==
Maria Galante and Audrey Uhler on the bluescreen set (top), and with the footage composited with computer-generated elements

Cyan Worlds and Mattel Interactive (then the owner of the Myst and Riven franchise) sought bids from several development companies for the development of a sequel to Myst and Riven; according to Game Developer, interested parties developed proposals including story concepts, analysis of the first two games, technology discussion, and technology demonstration. A core team from Presto Studios held discussions which analyzed Myst and Riven, then set out specific goals for the third game. According to Presto founder and producer Greg Uhler, these goals included visual variety in the Ages, a satisfying ending, and a way for players to gauge their progress during the game. The progress goal was very important for Uhler, who stated: "Players who had failed to complete Myst or Riven did so because they were unsure of how much remained of the game and what their goals were." Initially, Presto prepared three possible storylines for the game to follow; a meeting between Cyan, Presto, and Mattel yielded a completely different plot, which explored some of the loose ends hinted at in Myst. Mattel chose Presto for the task because of their talent, experience, and an existing business relationship.

Presto spent millions of U.S. dollars developing the game, using the studio's entire staff to complete the project. Development took two and a half years, of which nine months were spent on design and pre-production. Particular attention was devoted to strong visual styles and mechanics, which a critic described as "a collaboration of Jules Verne, Rube Goldberg and Claes Oldenburg". By July 2000, the game's look and feel, story, and puzzles were all complete, and Presto was building the game worlds. Pre-rendered environments, like those in the earlier Myst games, were used, providing what producer Dan Irish described as the "photorealistic ability to present the world in a convincing way. The 360-degree camera view also allows you to experience it in a way that makes it feel real." Presto used 3ds Max, Areté's Digital Nature Tools, and additional software to generate the pre-rendered visuals as well as dynamic water, character animations, and lighting.

As in Myst and Riven, the developers used live-action sequences instead of computer-generated actors and props; Irish stated that using computer graphics would have reminded players they were in a game, "which would wreck the immersion that is so critical to the Myst games". Live actors were filmed on a blue screen and then placed in the digital environments using chroma key technology. Before any shooting could begin, all the sets were constructed and filled with props the actors could use, costumes for all the characters were fashioned, and each scene was plotted out by storyboard. Rand Miller returned to play Atrus, a role he had filled since the first Myst game. Brad Dourif, a professional actor best known for the Child's Play films, agreed to play Saavedro because he was a huge Myst fan. Dourif noted that acting for a game was much more difficult than working on movie sets, as he could not see the player or interact with the game environment. Other actors included Maria Galante as Atrus' wife Catherine, and Greg Uhler's daughter Audrey in a cameo as Atrus' daughter Yeesha. Preparation for the video shoots took four months; filming the scenes took just seven days. Uhler noted that the video was one aspect of Myst that Presto "did wrong"; because high-definition video cameras were not used, the resulting video was not as crisp as developers had hoped.

After Mattel sold off their video gaming assets during their sale of The Learning Company to the Gores Technology Group in 2000, Exile ended up in the hands of a new subsidiary of The Learning Company titled GAME Studios. After Gores sold GAME Studios and their assets to Ubi Soft in March 2001, the title alongside the Myst franchise as a whole was put in the hands of the company.

=== Audio ===
The music for Myst and Riven was composed by Robyn Miller; Jack Wall created the score for the third installment. Irish stated that developing the music was one of the hardest aspects of Exile: "We had to match or exceed the surrealistic style of music that Robyn [Miller] had pioneered. It had to be recognizable as Myst, but unique and distinctive." Wall looked at the increasing complexity of games as an opportunity to give players a soundtrack with as much force as a movie score. Wall also echoed Irish's opinion that he wanted to make a very different score from the "wonderful sonic pastiche" of Myst and Riven, yet still recognizable as a sequel to the earlier games; Wall considered copying Miller's style as the "safe" yet unappealing route that was expected of him.

In preparation for his composition, Wall studied Miller's music, noting that he and Miller differed on their use of music theory. Miller, according to Wall, felt that "melody could easily get in the way of the experience of playing the game", but Wall felt that some melody provided something thematic for the player to grasp. Wall wanted the music to have a sense of purpose while still preserving interactivity, so he composed "reward music" for completing puzzles and recorded the score with a real orchestra.

== Reception ==
Reception

Aggregate scores
Aggregator	Score
GameRankings	PC: 77% PS2: 62% XBOX: 62%
Metacritic	PC: 83/100; PS2: 57/100; XBOX: 55/100

Review scores
Publication	Score
Computer Gaming World	2/5
Game Informer	7.5/10
GameRevolution	B−
GameSpot	8.7/10
GameSpy	79%
IGN	8/10
Next Generation	4/5
PC Format	67%
PC Gamer (US)	85%
PC Zone	35/100

Exile was generally received positively upon release; the PC version holds a 77% rating at GameRankings and an 83/100 rating at Metacritic.

Exile's graphics and sound received nearly universal praise, and were credited with completing the game's immersion. The puzzles were described as less difficult and more contained, meaning that players did not have to experiment with switches and then click several screens away to see the effect, as in Riven. Macworld's Peter Cohen praised Presto for giving out bits of story throughout the game, rather than providing exposition only during opening and closing sequences. The pacing and rewards system was also appreciated by reviewers. IGN concluded their review of the game by stating that Presto had done "a pretty good job with a notable addition to the series". The Daily Telegraph offered even stronger praise, saying that Presto had crafted the best Myst game in the series thus far, a sentiment that was echoed in other publications. The editors of Computer Games Magazine named Exile the best adventure game of 2001, and called it "a breath of fresh air amidst the otherwise barren crop of adventure titles." They also presented the game with their "Best Art Direction" and "Best Acting" awards, the latter for Dourif's performance.

Criticism of the game included complaints about the four-disc format of the game, which required players to swap out the installer disc with one of the other discs every time the player entered a new Age. GameSpot's Scott Osborne noted that due to the frame-by-frame nature of gameplay, it was occasionally difficult to discern where players were allowed to venture and what areas were unreachable. The Los Angeles Times reported that bugs including a lack of sound, incompatibility with certain graphics cards and system crashes were present in as many as 10 percent of the first shipment of discs. Reviewers who had not enjoyed Myst or Riven stated that there was nothing new or substantially different in the game to warrant interest; The New York Times observed, "Exile has everything you loved or hated about Myst and Riven."

During the 5th Annual Interactive Achievement Awards, the Academy of Interactive Arts & Sciences nominated Myst III for "Outstanding Achievement in Character or Story Development", "Outstanding Achievement in Original Musical Composition" and "PC Action/Adventure Game of the Year"; these awards ultimately went to Ico, Tropico and Return to Castle Wolfenstein, respectively. In 2011, Adventure Gamers named Myst III the 59th-best adventure game ever released.

=== Sales ===
Exile was highly anticipated; preorders topped 500,000 units by March 2001. The game was the best-selling computer title in the United States within a week of release, with an average retail price of $42. Its Collector's Edition claimed fifth place. The two SKUs held #1 and #9 the following week, by which time Ubisoft reported overall sales of 75,000 units. After staying in first place for three weeks, Exile dropped to third during the week ending June 2. It was the fourth-best-selling computer game of May in the region; PC Data reported sales of 54,468 retail units for the month. The Collector's Edition secured 12th place and sold 20,104. Exile remained on NPD Intelect's weekly computer game sales top 10 from June 3–23, and maintained fourth place for the month of June; PC Data tracked domestic retail sales of 49,287 units during the period. According to Ubisoft, Exile sold over 400,000 units worldwide by June 30.

Exile remained in NPD Intelect's monthly top 20 from July through August, and sold 173,569 domestic retail units by October, while its Collector's Edition sold 40,051. Following Exile's European release on September 7, it reached second place on the British sales charts, and #1 on those of Germany and France. Ubisoft reported global sales of over 750,000 units by the end of September, and of nearly 1.2 million units by the end of December. Its domestic retail sales for 2001 totaled 284,555 units, for $11.7 million in revenue. Domestic sales continued in 2002, with 80,810 retail units sold from January to June; and in 2003, with 43,735 sales for the year. By August 2006, Exile's computer version had sold 400,000 copies and earned $14 million in the United States alone. Edge ranked it as the country's 37th-best-selling computer game released between January 2000 and August 2006. As of the latter date, it was also the country's highest-selling Myst game released during the 2000s. By 2010, Exile's total sales had reached 1.5 million copies.

Despite strong sales, Exile was considered commercially disappointing compared to the phenomenal sales of the first two games, which had sold nearly 10 million units by the time of Exile's release. GameSpot editor Greg Kasavin told Time magazine that "Myst is no longer as relevant to gamers as it used to be" and that "it represents an antiquated style of gaming" compared to the 3D action games being released at the time. Soon after Exile's release, Presto announced it was discontinuing software development; the Xbox title Whacked! was to be the last title produced by the company. Presto employee Michael Saladino pointed to the maverick style of the studio and its inability to develop more than one title at a time as reasons for its folding. The next game in the Myst series, entitled Revelation, would be produced and published by Ubisoft.

=== Accolades ===
Award	Category	Result	Ref
Academy of Interactive Arts & Sciences	PC Action/Adventure Game of the Year	Nominated	
Academy of Interactive Arts & Sciences	Outstanding Achievement in Character or Story Development	Nominated	
Academy of Interactive Arts & Sciences	Outstanding Achievement in Original Musical Composition	Nominated	
GameSpot	Best Adventure Game (2001)	Won	
Computer Games Magazine	Best Adventure Game of the Year; Best Art Direction	Won	
Computer Games Magazine	Best Acting (Brad Dourif)	Won	
