= Chung Kuo =

Chung Kuo may refer to:

- Chung Kuo (novel series), a science fiction novel series by David Wingrove
- Chung Kuo, Cina, a 1972 film directed by Michelangelo Antonioni
- "Chung Kuo", a song by Vangelis from the album China
- Chung Kuo, a Wade–Giles romanization of 中國 (pinyin: Zhōngguó), meaning China
