= Myst IV: Revelation =

Adventure video game in the Myst series by Ubisoft

- The PC box art shows Tomahna on Earth; Yeesha's face can also be seen.
- Developer: Ubisoft Montreal
- Publishers: Ubisoft (physical); Cyan Worlds (digital)
- Directors: Patrick Fortier; Michel Poulette
- Producers: Catherine Roy; Genevieve Lord
- Designer: Patrick Fortier
- Programmer: Nicolas Beaudette
- Artist: Pascal Blanché
- Writer: Mary DeMarle
- Composer: Jack Wall
- Series: Myst
- Platforms: Mac OS X, Windows, Xbox
- Release: Mac OS X, Windows: NA: September 28, 2004; PAL: September 30, 2004; UK: October 1, 2004; Xbox: NA: March 28, 2005
- Genre: Adventure
- Mode: Single-player

Myst IV: Revelation is a 2004 adventure video game, the fourth installment in the Myst series, developed and published by Ubisoft. Like Myst III: Exile, Revelation combines pre-rendered graphics with digital video, but also features real-time 3D effects for added realism. The plot of Revelation follows up on plot details from the original Myst. The player is summoned by Atrus, a man who creates links to other worlds known as Ages by writing special linking books. Almost twenty years earlier, Atrus' two sons nearly destroyed all of his books and were imprisoned; Atrus now wishes to see if his sons' imprisonment has reformed them. The player travels to each brother's prison, in an attempt to recover Atrus' daughter Yeesha from the brothers' plot.

Development of Revelation lasted more than three years; Ubisoft had up to 80 employees working on the game. Musician Peter Gabriel lent his voice and a song to the game's audio; the original score was written by Exile's composer Jack Wall. Overall, reception to the game was positive; reviewers lauded the impressive visuals, sound, and puzzles. Publications such as Computer Gaming World took issue with the control scheme of the game. Revelation is the last game in the Myst series to use both prerendered backgrounds and full-motion video; the final game in the series, End of Ages, is rendered in real-time throughout.

== Gameplay ==
Myst IV: Revelation is an adventure game with puzzle elements. Players explore interactive worlds known as Ages by using the mouse or keyboard, solving puzzles and uncovering the game's narrative. Players cannot move freely across each Age; instead, as in the previous games in the Myst series, they travel by clicking set locations called "nodes", where players can rotate their view in any direction. Revelation also features a "Zip" mode, which allows a method of rapidly crossing explored areas by skipping intermediate nodes; areas that can be instantly traveled to are stored as thumbnail representations for rapid movement across Ages.

The mouse cursor helps to provide visual cues for player actions and movement. The cursor appears as a hand that changes depending on what the player is hovering the cursor over. For example, to move in a direction, the cursor changes to point in the intended direction. If players can view an item in greater detail, the cursor changes to a hand holding a magnifying glass. By clicking and dragging the cursor, the player performs actions such as pushing, pulling, and tapping items.

Revelation features several gameplay enhancements that aid puzzle solving and plot progression. Early in the game, players receive a camera, which can be used to take screenshots or pictures of clues. Players can use an on-screen journal to jot down notes instead of having to write down clues as with previous Myst games. Much of the game's story is revealed via flashbacks triggered by an amulet that has the power to relay memories attached to objects. Zip mode, the amulet, the camera, and the journal are available via a menu on the bottom of the game screen.

== Plot ==
Atrus calls the player to his home in Tomahna to request his friend's assistance. Atrus is the writer of special books, which serve as links to worlds known as Ages. Twenty years earlier, his two sons, Sirrus and Achenar, destroyed his library on Myst and trapped their parents in order to plunder the wealth of Atrus' Ages. The player's intervention saved Atrus, who had imprisoned his sons via traps intended for thieves. Atrus' wife Catherine hopes that, after twenty years, they have finally repented for their crimes. Atrus is not as sure his sons have reformed, and so wishes the player to act as an impartial judge. After being knocked unconscious by an explosion, the player realizes that Yeesha, Atrus' daughter, has disappeared.

The player sets out to find Yeesha, traveling to the prison Ages of Spire and Haven. On Spire, Sirrus has used his scientific knowledge to craft explosives, allowing him to breach the chamber that contained the linking book back to Tomahna, and has escaped; his journals reveal furthermore that he doesn't feel any remorse over his past crimes. Journeying to Haven reveals that Sirrus has also freed Achenar, who, unlike his brother, has begun to live in harmony with the surrounding nature causing him to regret his respective crimes. After Spire and Haven, the player journeys to the Age of Serenia and encounters Achenar, holding a "Life Stone"; Achenar tells the player that Sirrus is mad and has captured Yeesha, reveals that he kept a journal from twenty years earlier hidden on the island, and warns the player not to let Atrus come after them. Achenar's journal reveals that he and Sirrus planned to trap their mother Catherine on Riven and use a "Memory Chamber", a gigantic flower-like structure used to preserve the memories of the dead, to take control of Atrus' body and steal his knowledge of the Art of Writing. The Life Stone that Achenar stole is used to power the Memory Chambers, leaving the current one in danger of collapse. Shortly afterwards, the player finds Sirrus in an underwater harvester used for collecting memory globes for storing those memories; he blows up the harvester and flees to an older Memory Chamber, decrepit and abandoned. After encountering the player there, Sirrus tells the player that Achenar is the guilty one, and asks the player to find Atrus and bring him to Serenia to set things right.

Finding that the old Memory Chamber door has been locked by Sirrus with a special color-code combination, the player goes to the active Memory Chamber to seek aid from the Serenian Protectors, who believe that the answers can be found in their "mirror realm", known simply as Dream. Obtaining a "spirit guide", the player enters Dream and interacts with their guide, who tells them to interact with the Ancestors, the spirits of all Serenians who have died and had their memories preserved, to bring them into harmony. After bringing the Ancestors into harmony, the player discovers the combination to Sirrus' color-code lock. Returning to the "waking world" and entering the old Memory Chamber, the player finds Yeesha strapped into a chair, and she begs to be released from it with a silver lever. At that moment, Achenar arrives with a crossbow and the Life Stone, and warns that Sirrus used the Memory Chamber to remove Yeesha's memories and transfer his own into her body; Achenar points to an amber lever, which will reverse the mind-transfer.

At this point, as in the other games, the ending varies. Delaying too long will result in Yeesha (who is in fact Sirrus) taking Achenar's crossbow and shooting first him, then the player. The silver lever will release Yeesha (again, possessed by Sirrus), who kills Achenar and the player. In the good ending, the player pulls the amber lever, reversing the mind-transfer process. But because of the age of the Memory Chamber, it becomes unstable; Achenar tells the player to return to Dream and set Yeesha's memories right, while he uses the Life Stone to stabilize the chamber by inserting it into the chamber's shrine, poisoning him. In Dream, the player finds a monstrous creature, representing Sirrus' Dream-form, anchored to Yeesha's essence and preventing her from returning to her body; with no spirit guide, Sirrus is forced to cling to Yeesha to avoid being lost forever. He maintains his anchors by jumbling up Yeesha's memories. The player restores Yeesha's memories and frees her from Sirrus' grasp; Sirrus' Dream-form is destroyed by the shifting waves of Dream, killing him. The player awakens to find Achenar, fatally poisoned, confirming that the transfer was successful; he dies shortly afterward. The player returns to Tomahna to meet with Atrus, who says that Catherine has taken Yeesha to Tay (the "rebel Age" used to evacuate Catherine's people in Riven), and remarks that while his sons are gone, his daughter is safe.

== Development ==
Screenshot of the Serenia Age; each world in Revelation has its own distinct visual style. The visuals of the game were positively received upon release.

When Mattel Interactive still owned the rights to the Myst series, development of Myst IV was contracted out to DreamForge Intertainment, developers of the game Sanitarium; Dreamforge was hired before Presto Studios to develop Myst III: Exile. Dreamforge's Myst used real-time graphics, and was two years into development and twenty percent complete when Ubisoft, who had by this point acquired the rights to the series, canceled the project and decided to restart development from scratch internally.

According to Geneviève Lord, Revelation's producer, concluding the story of the two brothers had originally been intended as the plot for Myst III. Due to a limited amount of time to develop the game and to not interfere with Dreamforge's Myst game, whose plot details were still forming, the plot was dropped. The story was then redeveloped when Ubisoft began work on Myst IV. Cyan, Myst and Riven's developer, set down "a certain number of rules" that Ubisoft had to follow, according to Lord, but otherwise the team was free to develop new ideas, keeping in the spirit of Myst lore.

Ubisoft's development of Revelation took over three years and more than eighty employees. Early on, the development team made the decision to use pre-rendered graphics for the game, to match the style of previous Myst games. This proved to be a challenge, as the studio had never developed a pre-rendered game before, and had to hire over fifty new employees who had experience in the field. Full production was started on the game before artistic direction and engine development tools were fully established, and the resulting lack of focus and communication meant that a bad working relationship existed between the game designers, programmers, and modelers for most of the production.

As an improvement over the prerendered technology present in Myst, Riven, and Exile, Revelation uses its "ALIVE" engine to animate nearly everything in the game. The water animations, for example, are fully rendered for each location. The trees sway in the breeze, and the sky has moving clouds. Wildlife includes creatures that walk through the environment and occasionally interact with the player. The game also features a number of effects applied in real time, such as lens flares, dynamic lighting, and an optional focal blur. In a trend started by the original Myst, the game uses live actors to play the game's roles in live-action video sequences. There are more than 70 minutes of video, and the game allows players to look around and interact with the video while it is playing. Revelation was the first game in the series to be initially released on a DVD-ROM format at launch; a multiple CD-ROM version was not produced as it would have taken twelve compact discs to fit the data. Riven had been released as a DVD-ROM, but only after its first 5-CD version. Exile was later ported to DVD-ROM for the 10th Anniversary collection.

=== Audio ===
"It is important to me to get totally engrossed [in the game] before laying down a single note. For Exile, I read all 3 books, replayed Myst and Riven, read the new story line and spent days just listening to the soundtracks and taking copious notes to try find the important themes that I might want to carry forward. Revelation was the same."

— Jack Wall

Jack Wall composed, conducted, and produced the music for Revelation; the game was his second game score, following the music for Myst III: Exile. Wall was initially a sound engineer and producer, and stated composing "was kind of like a next step for me, rather than something I decided to do early on". The success and recognition of Exile's score landed Wall the job of writing Revelation's music with a budget of $100,000—twice the amount he had worked with for Exile.

Wall reused, reorchestrated and expanded themes composed by previous Myst composer Robyn Miller; for example, Wall reused Atrus' Theme from Riven and the brothers' leitmotifs from the original game. Wall credited the Myst universe and story with allowing him to write music "Western ears are somewhat less accustomed to"; Revelation's score was inspired by Eastern European music that Wall enjoyed in the 1990s.

In addition to Jack Wall's score, the game features a song by Peter Gabriel entitled "Curtains", originally a B-side from Gabriel's single "Big Time". Gabriel also performed a voiceover for the game.

Myst IV: Revelation – The Soundtrack track list
No.	Title	Length
1.	"Main Theme"	4:29
2.	"Yeesha's Joyride"	1:03
3.	"Enter Tomahna"	6:37
4.	"Darkness"	2:59
5.	"Achenar's Prelude"	0:13
6.	"Jungle Landing"	3:40
7.	"The Swamp"	2:25
8.	"The Predator"	3:59
9.	"Lakeside"	2:36
10.	"Achenar Meeting"	1:53
11.	"Welcome"	3:00
12.	"Enter Spire"	3:30
13.	"Prison Level"	4:56
14.	"Sirrus Defends / Sirrus' Rage"	2:31
15.	"Nearest Island"	2:52
16.	"Leaving Spire"	1:00
17.	"Enter Serenia"	3:11
18.	"The Monastery"	2:12
19.	"Dream"	0:59
20.	"Hall of Spirits"	2:32
21.	"The Serenians"	2:04
22.	"The Revelation / The Sacrifice"	2:24
23.	"End Game"	2:07
24.	"Atrus' Speech"	1:45

== Reception ==
Reception

Aggregate scores
Aggregator	Score
GameRankings	PC: 82% XBOX: 75%
Metacritic	PC: 82/100; XBOX: 75/100

Review scores
Publication	Score
1Up.com	B+
Computer Gaming World	4/5
Computer and Video Games	8.5/10
GameSpot	8.5/10
IGN	9/10

Overall, Revelation was received positively by critics; the game garnered 82/100 and 82% averages on aggregate sites Metacritic and GameRankings, respectively; the Xbox version of the game received less favorable scores than the computer version. Its computer version debuted in sixth place on the NPD Group's sales chart for the October 3–9 period, before dropping to tenth in its second week. The game claimed positions 92 and 12 for the months of September and October, respectively, and sold between 100,000 and 400,000 copies in the United States by August 2006. By that date, combined sales of all Myst games released in the 2000s had reached 1.6 million units in the country.

As with previous Myst games, the visuals and interactivity of Revelation were singled out as the strongest features. Reviewers praised the use of subtle animations to bring the scenery to life; GameSpot's Greg Kasavin stated that the additions "truly helps make each scene in the game seem like more than just a panoramic picture, and instead it feels like a real place". Jack Wall's score and the sound design were consistently praised. The addition of the in-game camera and notes system was also positively received. PC Zone proclaimed that although it would have been easy for the developers to lose heart after the disappointing Uru: Ages Beyond Myst, Ubisoft had instead produced "one of the most polished games" the reviewer, Paul Presley, had ever come across.

Certain reviewers criticized aspects of the gameplay that had not been fixed or altered from previous Myst titles. Computer Gaming World, for example, complained about having to hunt for the small hotspots that allowed actions to occur. A reviewer for The Houston Chronicle judged the method of traveling from node to node as tiresome to navigate. Another complaint was that the slow cursor animations made searching for actions occasionally tedious. Many publications noted the rather steep computer requirements; in addition to requiring a DVD-ROM drive, the game took up more than 7 gigabytes when fully installed. Charles Herold of The New York Times, the only mainstream critic with a negative view of Revelation's music, dismissed the score as "tediously literal".

Revelation would be the last Myst game that used prerendered graphics or full motion video. Cyan Worlds, the original developer of both Myst and Riven, used real-time rendered graphics for the next installment in the series, Myst V: End of Ages. Myst V was announced as the final game in the series.

Revelation won GameSpot's and GameSpy's 2004 "Best Adventure Game" awards, and was selected as a runner-up in these categories by Computer Gaming World and IGN, losing respectively to In Memoriam and Sid Meier's Pirates! It also received nominations from GameSpot for "Best Original Music", "Best Sound Effects", "Best Story" and "Best Graphics, Artistic", and from Computer Games Magazine for "Best Original Music". GameSpot's editors called Revelation "a highly traditional adventure game that embodies nearly all the virtues of this classic genre." During the 8th Annual Interactive Achievement Awards, the Academy of Interactive Arts & Sciences nominated Myst IV for "Computer Action/Adventure Game of the Year". In 2011, Adventure Gamers named Myst IV the 40th-best adventure game ever released.

== Cast ==
- Rand Miller as Atrus
- Juliette Gosselin as Yeesha
- Brian Wrench as Sirrus
- Guy Sprung as Achenar
- Jennifer Podemski as Anya
- Alison Sealy-Smith as Zanika
- Kira Clavell as Moiri and Raeane
- Jessica Courtemanche as Yannin
- Angèle Coutu as Caradell

=== Voice cast ===
- Claudia Besso as Comedian VO
- Peter Gabriel as the spirit guide
