= MagiQuest =

Live action magic role-playing game

MagiQuest is a live action role-playing game where players take the role of magic users to complete quests and adventures laid out by the game. The game takes place in dedicated MagiQuest locations in which players, known as Magi, use an infrared (IR) emitting wand to interact with objects within the location.

== History ==
The first MagiQuest opened in Myrtle Beach, South Carolina at noon on June 15, 2005. The opening celebration included live appearances by actors featured in the quests. Additional MagiQuest locations subsequently opened in East Hanover, New Jersey and Pigeon Forge, Tennessee. Great Wolf Resorts made an agreement with Creative Kingdoms in 2008 to install the game at all current Great Wolf Lodge resorts. In 2010, MagiQuest opened in the County Fair Games Gallery at Six Flags Great America in Gurnee, Illinois. MagiQuest closed at the end of the 2010 park season and was removed from the park. On July 31, 2011, MagiQuest opened in Fun City at the Palisades Mall in West Nyack, New York. In Japan, there was a MagiQuest kingdom near Tokyo Dome as well as at Lagunasia park. Sometime between December 2011 and January 2012, the first Canadian MagiQuest opened in a Great Wolf Lodge in Niagara Falls, Ontario.

On September 7, 2015, the Myrtle Beach MagiQuest closed permanently. Other locations in West Nyack, New York, and East Hanover, New Jersey were also permanently closed.

The Myrtle Beach location was created by Creative Kingdoms, the developer of MagiQuest's technology and associated patents. When the Myrtle Beach location closed it was owned by Great Wolf Resorts, who acquired majority stake of Creative Kingdoms in a 2010 hostile takeover. Other locations are franchised besides the ones in Great Wolf Lodges, though many have also closed due to them cutting off support making it difficult to manage operations post-takeover.

=== Related games ===
DinoQuest, a dinosaur-themed interactive game based on the same patented technologies is located in Santa Ana, CA.

Announced at the IAAPA 2009 (International Association of Amusement Park and Attractions) trade show are plans for Creative Kingdoms (the parent company of MagiQuest) to create a spin-off company, 'AquaKingdoms' that will bring a new form of the technology used in MagiQuest to water based attractions. The first product of AquaKingdoms, SplashQuest, was introduced in prototype form to Schlitterbahn in New Braunfels, TX for the summer of 2009, though nothing else has come out of AquaKingdoms since the buyout.

CompassQuest, a very similar game, can be found in some of the same locations as MagiQuest. It uses a compass as well as a wand, and there are no boss battles, unlike MagiQuest. At the Myrtle Beach location, after completing a Wayfinder Quest, the compass can activate stations to show you where items are for every quest and adventure in the game. At Great Wolf Lodge, in addition to the Wayfinder and Treasure Quests, it unlocks 7 other quests centered around certain lands (Piney Path, Tangled Woods, etc.).

In Fall 2013, a new game called ShadowQuest (now known as Journey to Save the Light), the first of projects to be created by Great Wolf post buyout, began to appear at six of the MagiQuest locations at Great Wolf Lodge. In its early version, it used pre-rendered videos for quest intros and success videos. However, encounters are now rendered in real time, allowing for dueling spells to immediately take effect.

When the Great Wolf Lodge in New England opened in 2014, it featured a new version of MagiQuest called "Guardians of the Realm Portals", with new characters, updated quest requirements, and different strategies/real-time rendering for the pixie, goblin, and dragon encounters. It would continue to use the same software as the older game until the lodge was upgraded.

In early 2016, the Anaheim lodge opened with a beta version of the new "MagiQuest Chronicles" which included a new version of Guardians of the Realm Portals, where all of the computer graphics (both at encounters and quest stations) are rendered in real time, as well as Journey to Save the Light (formerly ShadowQuest), and Rise of the Totem Masters, a toys-to-life game where the player levels up a totem figure by battling dark creatures. After the creation of MagiQuest Chronicles the original version and platform of the old game was dubbed as "Legacy MagiQuest" and Chronicles has also been given the fan name of "MagiQuest 2.0". It has since been expanded to all new Great Wolf Lodges that have opened in the past few years and the Williamsburg, Virginia location was also converted from the original game to MagiQuest Chronicles. The MagiQuest fan community has been quite critical of Chronicles as its quite different from the original gameplay and spirit of legacy.

In Summer 2021, another new version of the game debuted, officially branded as just MagiQuest, it is known internally as 'MagiQuest+' or MagiQuest Evergreen to differentiate it from the Legacy, ShadowQuest and MagiQuest Chronicles games. Like Chronicles, it is far removed from the original experience provided by the game prior to the Great Wolf takeover.

In 2025, a mobile game titled MagiQuest was released on the Google Play Store. This game is entirely unrelated to the live action role-playing attraction MagiQuest. It was developed by ShumForge Studio in 2024. Despite sharing the same title, the two products are not connected. In this game, Players explore the land of Klarstood, complete quests, and compete on a global leaderboard.

== Gameplay ==
=== The Ancient Book of Wisdom ===
At all MagiQuest locations opened prior to 2013, with the exception of the Williamsburg Great Wolf Lodge, players are provided with an "Ancient Book of Wisdom," a booklet containing hints and riddles to help locate necessary object for completing quests, game directions, requirements for adventures (more advanced quests that require the use of certain spells obtained by completing quests), and a map of the location. The book's contents are unique to each location, much like how the quests and adventures are also unique to each location. The Book of Wisdom's ShadowQuest counterpart is called the ShadowQuest Guide.

At the Williamsburg Great Wolf Lodge and all MagiQuest locations opened after 2014, in addition to a printout map of the game area, players also use the MagiQuest Book of Wisdom app on iPhone or Android.

=== Quests and adventures ===
The objective of MagiQuest is to build and gain power by obtaining magic runes. These runes are awarded for completing certain tasks, using the wand to activate targets marked with a stylised Q. The runes available on Rune Quests are: Lightning, Enchant Creature, Music, Protection, Freeze, Distraction, Healing, Portal, Dazzle, Reveal, Ice Arrow, and Master Magi. While the Master Magi Rune does not grant any spells like the other Runes, earning it opens up new Rune Quests specifically for Master Magi. These Runes are the Fire, Shield, and Potion Runes. The Celestial and Great Wolf Runes are also available at some Great Wolf Lodge locations.

Outside of the kingdom of MagiQuest, a player can use their wand and the powers they have earned to duel each other for gold and experience points. At the Myrtle Beach location, Magi could also participate in "Garden Quest", a special rune that took Magi around Broadway at the Beach, an outdoor shopping mall in Myrtle Beach.

== MagiQuest Online ==
MagiQuest Online (MQ Online) was an online version of the game created by Cyan Worlds, the creators of Myst. The game ran on the same engine used in Cyan's own online game, Myst Online: Uru Live (Plasma engine). MQ Online was sold in chapters; but only the first chapter was developed and available for gameplay. While the game had a free trial mode, each "chapter" had to be purchased individually per player account. Players who completed chapter one online were allowed to access an additional quest, the Silver Dragon, that could be played at selected MagiQuest and Great Wolf Lodge locations in the United States.

On October 1, 2012 Creative Kingdoms announced it would discontinue MagiQuest Online on December 31, 2012. As of 2024, the game is no longer available, and the Silver Dragon quest was made available to all Master Magi who defeated Charlock, the red dragon.

== Technology ==
The MagiQuest wand is a battery-powered infrared (IR) remote control device with an LED at the tip. Motion sensors (a spring sensor and a ball-and-tube sensor) inside the wand detect movement and cause the LED to emit a brief series of flashes which is unique to that wand. These flashes can be seen by pointing the wand at the lens of any digital video camera in a dark room. The wand's range is several meters. There is no on/off switch; when the wand is left motionless, the circuit is not energized, saving battery power.

The Compass Quest compass is a plastic housing containing an embedded RFID device that doesn't require battery power. Like the wand, every compass has a unique numeric code that is transmitted when in the range of a detector, approximately 1-2 centimeters (about 1 inch).

No information is stored in either the wand or the compass. The player's name, birthday, and nickname are associated with the wand and/or compass ID number at the time of purchase. The exact names and date given are irrelevant. This association is stored in a central online database server, and can be transferred to a new wand if the original one is lost. The server tracks the current status (runes and gold acquired, current quest, etc.) of every player in the system.

In-game objects contained embedded IR sensors, plus a set of RFID panels shaped like the outline of the compass. Game objects can include pictures on the walls, statues, ceiling tiles, animatronic chests, video kiosks and projection rooms. Most stations have lights and audio prompts which play briefly on activation and shut off automatically, but kiosks and projection rooms additionally contain touchscreen video displays which allow the player to interact with the system for a short session. No login is required other than the presence of the wand or compass.

Gameplay typically consists of using a kiosk to receive instructions for a quest or adventure, then finding and activating a series of game objects. The requirements for the initial quests are printed in an instruction booklet supplied with the wand, but some quests must be received from the kiosks and committed to memory. Informational kiosks throughout the complex can be used to find out what parts of the current quest have been completed and what is left to do, but these omit certain clues to the locations of the objects.

The database is nationwide. The player's status (current quest, number of gold pieces, etc.) for every location can be queried from any informational kiosk in the network. Within a complex, it is updated continuously—for instance, after activating one object, a time limit (e.g. 30 seconds) may be given to find and activate the next object in the series, and if the limit is exceeded by even a few seconds, the next object will instruct the player to return to the previous station.

== Music ==
The band Blackmore's Night performed some of the music for MagiQuest. Candice Night, the band's vocalist, plays the role of Princess Candice. She also plays the role of Princess Amora, who is seen only at Great Wolf Lodge locations.

== See also ==
- Laser tag
- TV remote

== Notes ==
- "Dells' MagiQuest casts spell over young players". archive.jsonline.com.
