= Spelunx =

1991 video game

- Developer: Cyan
- Publisher: Broderbund
- Designers: Robyn Miller, Rand Miller
- Platforms: Macintosh, Microsoft Windows
- Release: 1991, 1993 (Steam) (PC only): WW: August 18, 2010
- Genre: Educational/Adventure
- Mode: Single-player

Spelunx and the Caves of Mr. Seudo is an educational computer game intended for young children developed by Cyan (now Cyan Worlds) in 1991.

== Gameplay and plot ==
Spelunx is a first-person point-and-click adventure game. It is structured as a collection of rooms connected by a series of tunnels (accessed via elevator). Each room contains interactive mini-games and experiments, most of which introduce the player to a specific field of knowledge. A hidden control panel within the game allows for the rearrangement of the caves and other locations, and even for the expansion of the caves with the addition of newer rooms. Although it was the intention of Cyan to continue releasing new rooms over time for players to explore, this never occurred.

Although Spelunx contains a basic frame story (centered on the scientific endeavors of one Professor Spelunx and his willing assistant, Mr. Seudo), there is no other plot. Although the characters Professor Spelunx and Mr. Seudo are mentioned (and even depicted in-game) the player never meets them.

== Development ==
It was designed by the brothers Robyn and Rand Miller (better known now as the creators of Myst). The game was programmed and implemented using HyperCard, with Robyn Miller hand-drawing all of the in-game graphics and scenery. The game's title was derived from the verb "to spelunk", referring to the act of exploring caves. It was intended to be explored and played with—like a toy—rather than completed or won.

== Reception ==
Computer Gaming World stated that Spelunx would "provide hours of entertainment in a variety of ways for both children and adults".

== Legacy ==
In 1993, following the release of Myst, Cyan produced a colorized version of Spelunx. Although the original monochrome version contained small amounts of color at specific locations or during specific events (utilizing MacroMind Player, a predecessor of Adobe Flash), this new version (colorized by artist Josh Staub) contained full-color scenery and animation (as well as a small easter egg: an image of Myst Island hidden within one of the original rooms).

More recently, the color version has been ported to Windows and released on the Steam digital distribution service as part of the Cyan Complete Pack, alongside other early Cyan titles (including Myst).

== See also ==
- The Manhole (1988)
- Cosmic Osmo and the Worlds Beyond the Mackerel (1989)
