= D-na =

D-na may refer to:

- DNA, genetic-coding compound
- D'ni, race of non-player characters in Myst computer-game series

== See also ==
- Na-dene, Native-American language family
