= Lagunasia =

Amusement park in Gamagōri, Japan

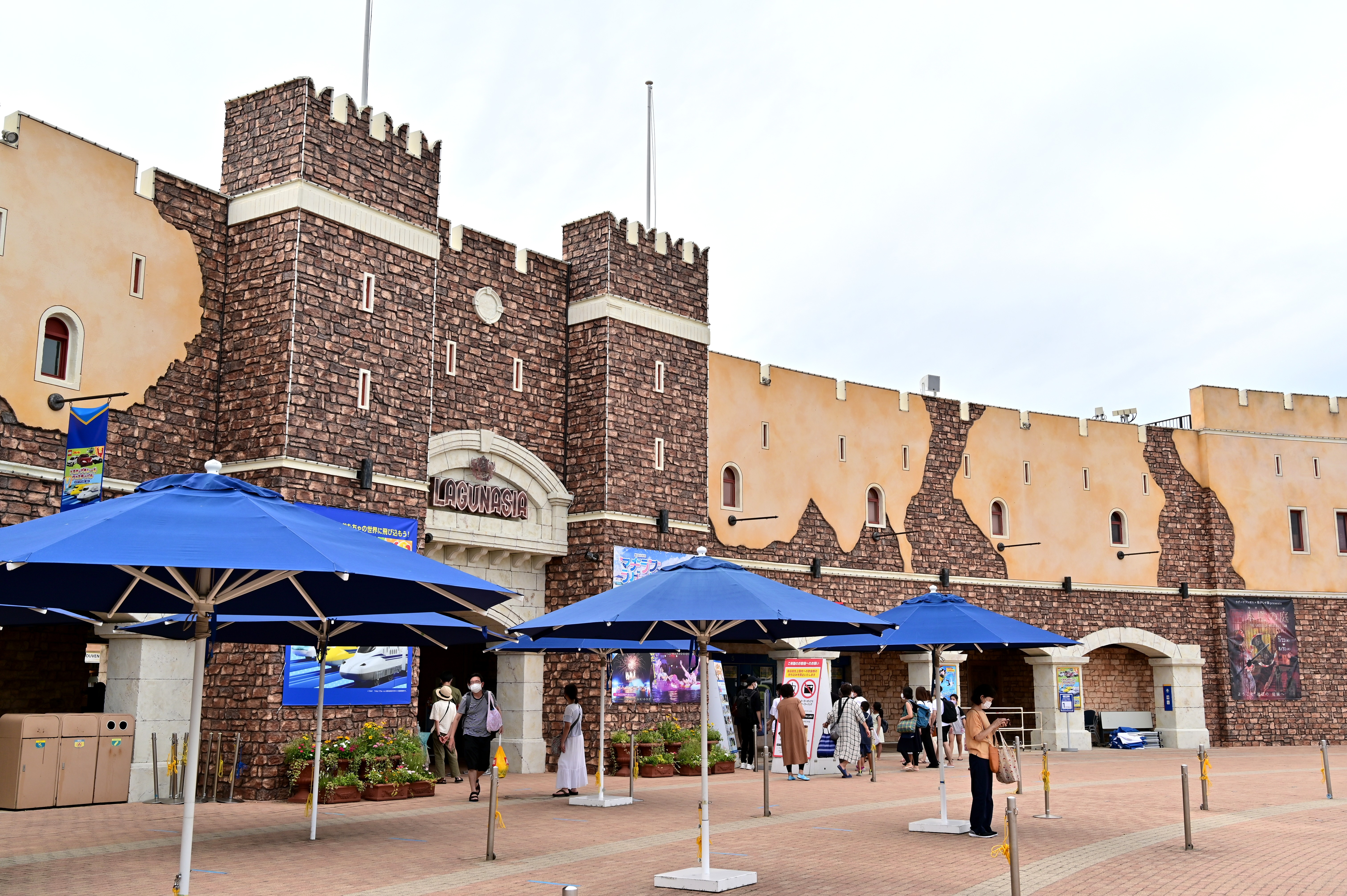
- Entry to Lagunasia
- Interactive map of Lagunasia
- Location: Gamagōri, Aichi, Japan
- Coordinates: 34°48′31″N 137°16′19″E
- Status: Operating
- Opened: 25 April 2002
- Attendance: 1,000,000
- Area: 300,000 m^{2} (3,200,000 sq ft)
- Website: Official website

Lagunasia (ラグナシア, Ragunashia) is an amusement park in Gamagōri, Aichi, Japan. It is home to the Aqua Wind, Pirates' Blast and Stellar roller coasters. The park was also the first Magiquest live role playing game location outside of the United States.

Lagunasia was opened on April 25, 2002. The construction of the amusement park is located in the Laguna Gamagōri, a resort which was a renewal project around the coast of Gamagōri city.
