= Astate: La Malédiction des Templiers =

1990 video game

- Developer(s): Calypso
- Publisher(s): New-Deal Productions
- Platform(s): Amiga and Atari ST
- Release: 1990
- Mode(s): Single-player

Astate: La Malédiction des Templiers is a 1990 adventure game developed by Calypso and published by New-Deal Productions for the Amiga and Atari ST. The game is notable for being a proto Myst-clone, released four years prior to the game being released.

== Plot and gameplay ==
An archeologist is searching the French countryside and Templar ruins to find pieces of a statue.

The point-and-click adventure game has static screens and an icon-based interface. A proto Myst-clone, the game is a purely graphic adventure from the first person perspective, with no subtitles or voice over. The game has many death states, as well as unwinnable states by discarding important items.

== Critical reception ==
ACAR praised the game's graphics, plot, and potential. Amiga Action felt the game was pretty slow and pointless. The Games Machine described the experience as a "fruitless wander", and deemed the experience bizarre due to the game relying on graphics and abandoning text altogether.
