= The Myst Reader =

Collection of novels based on video game

- Author: Rand Miller; Robyn Miller; David Wingrove
- Publisher: Hyperion
- Publication date: September 1, 2004
- ISBN: 1-4013-0781-7

The Myst Reader is a collection of three novels based on the Myst series of adventure games. The collection was published in September 2004 and combines three works previously published separately: The Book of Atrus (1995), The Book of Ti'ana (1996), and The Book of D'ni (1997). The novels were each written by British science-fiction writer David Wingrove with assistance from Myst's creators, Rand and Robyn Miller.

Each novel centers on the family of Atrus, a scientist and explorer who has the ability to write special books which serve as links to other worlds, known as Ages. This ability, known as the Art, was practiced extensively by an ancient civilization known as the D'ni, who were only mentioned briefly in the original Myst game. The plot of each book reveals more of the Myst back-story and the workings of the D'ni.

Upon release, reception of the novels have been mixed. Many reviewers expressed surprise that a novel based on a videogame worked; others found the prose dull and uninteresting, or that the book could not stand on its own without the game. The individual books sold well, with The Book of Atrus making USA Today's Best-Selling Books list.Two more novels were planned; a sample of the first, The Book of Marrim, was packaged with an edition of Myst V: End of Ages.

== Background ==
Myst co-creators and brothers Rand and Robyn Miller often created fictional worlds and stories as young children. Their vision was refined by the works of fantasy and science fiction writers such as J. R. R. Tolkien, Robert A. Heinlein, and Isaac Asimov; Star Wars offered them a glimpse at an exciting, fully realized fictional world. Robyn began working on a children's novel called Dunnyhut; though he never completed the work, elements from the story influenced aspects of Myst's story.

The video game Myst tells the story of a special book which serves as a link to a world known as Myst. Myst is the home of an explorer named Atrus, who lives on the island with his wife Catherine and two sons, Sirrus and Achenar. An unnamed protagonist drops into Myst and finds the island strangely deserted. As the player explores Myst, they discover Sirrus and Achenar trapped inside two books. Both swear that their parents are dead due to the machinations of the other brother, and instruct the player to repair their books so they can be freed. In truth, Atrus and Catherine are merely imprisoned, and both Sirrus and Achenar are guilty of growing power-hungry and destroying Atrus' books. The player frees Atrus, leading to the events of the sequel Riven.

The Millers began the game's development by sketching out puzzles and each individual world the player would explore in the game. As the brothers were conceptualizing the various worlds, they also wrote down pieces of the story. At some point in the development of these bits of story, Robyn explained in an interview, "We started realizing this story is actually something we thought the public would enjoy, so we started pressing to make [the novel] happen." Buoyed by strong sales of the video game, publisher Hyperion signed a three-novel, US$1 million deal with the brothers.

The Miller brothers wrote the entire first novel, but were unsatisfied with the result; the Millers pointed out that writing a character for a novel is much harder than writing the characters of a game. Hyperion recruited author David Wingrove to assist with the project; the Millers ended up giving Wingrove a detailed draft, and the author rewrote the entire book. The book's design was made to fit the themes of the game; the novels are made to look like journals found in Myst, with embossed covers and pages darkened as though with time and use.

To promote the release of The Book of Atrus, the Millers embarked on an eleven-city book tour. The publicity stemming from the book and game surprised the Millers, who remained unaccustomed to their new-found fame. "The excitement is in talking to people who've walked through our world," Rand Miller said in an interview. "But we're not used to signing books - we're a bit out of our element."

== Plot ==
=== Book of Atrus ===
The Book of Atrus serves as a prequel to the events of the eponymous first game in the Myst series, and introduces both new characters and old characters seen in the games. The book's protagonist is Atrus. He is raised by his grandmother Anna after his mother dies and his father abandons him. Eventually, Atrus' father Gehn returns from his explorations of the ruins of the D'ni empire and enlists Atrus to come follow him back to the fallen city. Gehn teaches Atrus the Art, a skill the D'ni used to create special books which allow transport between worlds known as Ages. Atrus is awed by the Art at first, but he is horrified when he witnesses Gehn's manipulation and dismissive attitude to the inhabitants of the Ages. He also comes to understand Gehn's selfish, cold cruelty and his own power-hungry nature; Gehn believes that he creates the Ages he writes, instead of creating links to preexisting universes. Gehn destroys Atrus' first Age, Inception, because it does not follow Gehn's style of writing. After attempting to escape his father, Gehn traps Atrus in a locked chamber in D'ni, with the only escape to Gehn's own Age of Riven. On Riven Atrus falls in love with a villager named Catherine.

Catherine and Atrus hatch a plan to trap Gehn on Riven. Gehn is stranded when Atrus and Catherine destroy all linking books on Riven, escaping by using a book Ti'ana wrote for them, leading to the Age of Myst. Atrus drops the Myst linking book into a massive disturbance on Riven known as the Star Fissure; the book falls through the fissure to be picked up by the Stranger in Myst. The closing words of the book are the opening narrative from the video game.

=== Book of Ti'ana ===
The Book of Ti'ana takes place earlier than The Book of Atrus. The first part of the book focuses on the life of Atrus' grandfather Aitrus with his parents Kahlis and Tasera, Aitrus' meeting with Ti'ana, and the birth of their son Gehn. The book also explains the destruction of the D'ni civilization. Two D'ni, Veovis and A'Gaeris, plot to destroy their civilization, which they believe has been corrupted. Veovis and A'Gaeris create a plague which wipes out many of the D'ni and follows them through the Ages. Veovis is murdered by A'Gaeris for refusing to write an Age where the two of them would have been worshipped as gods, and Aitrus sacrifices himself in order to lure A'Gaeris to an unstable Age, killing them both.

=== Book of D'ni ===
In The Book of D'ni, Atrus opens the crumbled exit of the room in K'veer, where he had been imprisoned by Gehn, and gains access to the rest of D'ni. Atrus and his team set out to find linking books and search for D'ni survivors. Eventually, Atrus and the rest of the D'ni plan on rebuilding the civilization, but this plan is put to a halt when a book leading to a great lost Age called Terahnee is found. Terahnee is a sister Age to D'ni and is populated by descendants of the same ancestors as the D'ni.

At first sight, Terahnee seems like a Utopia. Everyone lives in sumptuous palaces, and nobody goes hungry; in reality, the society is run by slave labor. After writing new Ages, the Terahnee people capture the inhabitants to use as slaves, considering themselves gods over their Ages. The Terahnee people are taught not to 'see' the slaves; only the servants interact with the lower orders. The Terahnee are suddenly stricken by a plague the D'ni brought with them; Atrus and his companions help the Age's slaves recover and create a new society before returning to D'ni and sealing up the path to Terahnee.

== Reception ==
Reception to the Myst novels has been mixed. Sybil Steinberg of Publishers Weekly reviewed The Book of Atrus and stated that Wingrove's achievement of a "rollicking adventure tale" was improbable, given that previous game-to-book attempts had failed horribly. Booklist also gave the book a positive review, stating that the plot was predictable but the book served its purpose "to either introduce readers to the game, or supply players with back stories". A reviewer for New Scientist called the story "a good, light read for the holiday season."

Other reviewers felt that the novel could not stand on its own, and relied on the games to maintain relevancy. Albert Kim of Entertainment Weekly also gave the novel a mediocre score, saying the main issue that doomed The Book of Atrus was that it removed the mystery from Myst. "Much of the game's charm is derived from its eeriness, a haunting aura that is lost in the text," Kim wrote. Fantasy and Science Fiction stated that the prose was not up to the task of bringing the characters to life. Steinberg later stated that with the books "bereft of the game's dazzling graphics and its hypnotic interactive dimension", the second and third novels plodded along with boring prose.

Despite the mixed reviews, the Myst novels sold well. The Book of Atrus reached a top spot of 176 on USA Today's Best-Selling Books list. More than 450,000 copies of Book of Atrus and Book of Ti'ana have been sold. A fourth and fifth Myst novel were planned. The first, entitled Myst: The Book of Marrim, was announced in 2004; a preview of the novel was packaged in the Myst V: End of Ages special edition. A group of independent filmmakers adapted The Book of Ti'ana into a screenplay, with the blessing of the Millers. The project later stalled.

A new edition of The Book of Atrus, published by Cyan via print-on-demand, was released in September 2023, shortly before the thirtieth anniversary of the original release of Myst. In 2025, Cyan published all three books in a new digital edition called The Myst Trilogy.
