= Tim Larkin (composer) =

American composer and video game developer

Tim Larkin is a composer and sound designer for Valve, and previously the audio director for Cyan, best known for the Myst series of video games. At Cyan, he worked as a sound designer for Riven, and as a composer for realMyst, Uru: Ages Beyond Myst and Myst V: End of Ages.

He has 23 years experience in the game audio industry. He started in the game industry working as a composer/sound designer for Broderbund. He created sound design for Riven while working there and was later hired at Cyan to work on realMyst and Uru. Tim still performs session work regularly as a trumpet player as well as doing freelance sound design and composition outside Cyan. He created music and sound design for titles such as Middle-earth, The Incredibles, Pariah, The Lord of the Rings, and Prince of Persia. He won the Academy Award for sound design at the 75th Academy Awards for his work on the Sony Imageworks animated short film, The ChubbChubbs!. In the 2000s, Larkin was hired by Valve and worked on a number of their games, including Team Fortress 2, Portal, Portal 2, Counter-Strike: Global Offensive, Dota 2, and Artifact.

Tim's experience in the music industry includes live performances as a trumpet player with artists Natalie Cole, Ella Fitzgerald, James Brown, Mel Tormé, Sheila E and Huey Lewis. He recorded on record albums for Ice-T and as a solo artist for Avenue Jazz. He worked on HBO's The Rat Pack, White Mile and Floundering. He has done the trumpet work for the documentaries National Geographic's Lost Fleet of Guadalcanal, Pearl Harbor and The White House, and American Experience documentaries on Galileo and the Wright Brothers.

== URU ==
Uru's music was composed by Tim Larkin, who had started his career at game publisher Broderbund, and lobbied hard to be included on Riven's development team. Larkin worked on creating different sound effects for Riven and was chosen to score Uru after composer and Myst co-creator Robyn Miller left Cyan in early 1998. The music for the game was collected as a soundtrack, Uru Music, that was released in 2003. Larkin chose the instrumentation for each track based on the various digital environments in the game. When the player is in the game's representation of New Mexico, for example, Larkin used a resonator guitar and flutes, creating what he called something "indigenous to a southwest type of feel that's very contemporary". In other areas Larkin described the game's music as being "less typical than you would find in most games" because of the exotic landscape the developers had created. To create contemporary and exotic types of music in the game, Larkin employed a combination of real and synthesized instruments. Sometimes Larkin replaced synthesized performances with those of real musicians, as in the track "Gallery Theme", where a synthesized vocal part was eventually discarded in favor of soprano Tasha Koontz. To create an exotic feel, Larkin used a group of Maasai tribesmen's chanting, who were recorded during their visit to Spokane, Washington, where Cyan Worlds was located at that time.

The Uru soundtrack received two Game Audio Network Guild (G.A.N.G.) nominations in 2004—one for "Best Original Vocal Song (Choral)" for the "Gallery Theme" (which won), and another for "Best Original Soundtrack." Beyond its use in Uru, "Gallery Theme" was later used in the theatrical trailer for Steven Spielberg's film, Munich. The Uru soundtrack comes on an enhanced CD, containing a (nearly) four-minute music video called "Uru: The Makers" and an audio-only interview with Rand Miller and Tim Larkin.
