= Rand Miller =

American businessman

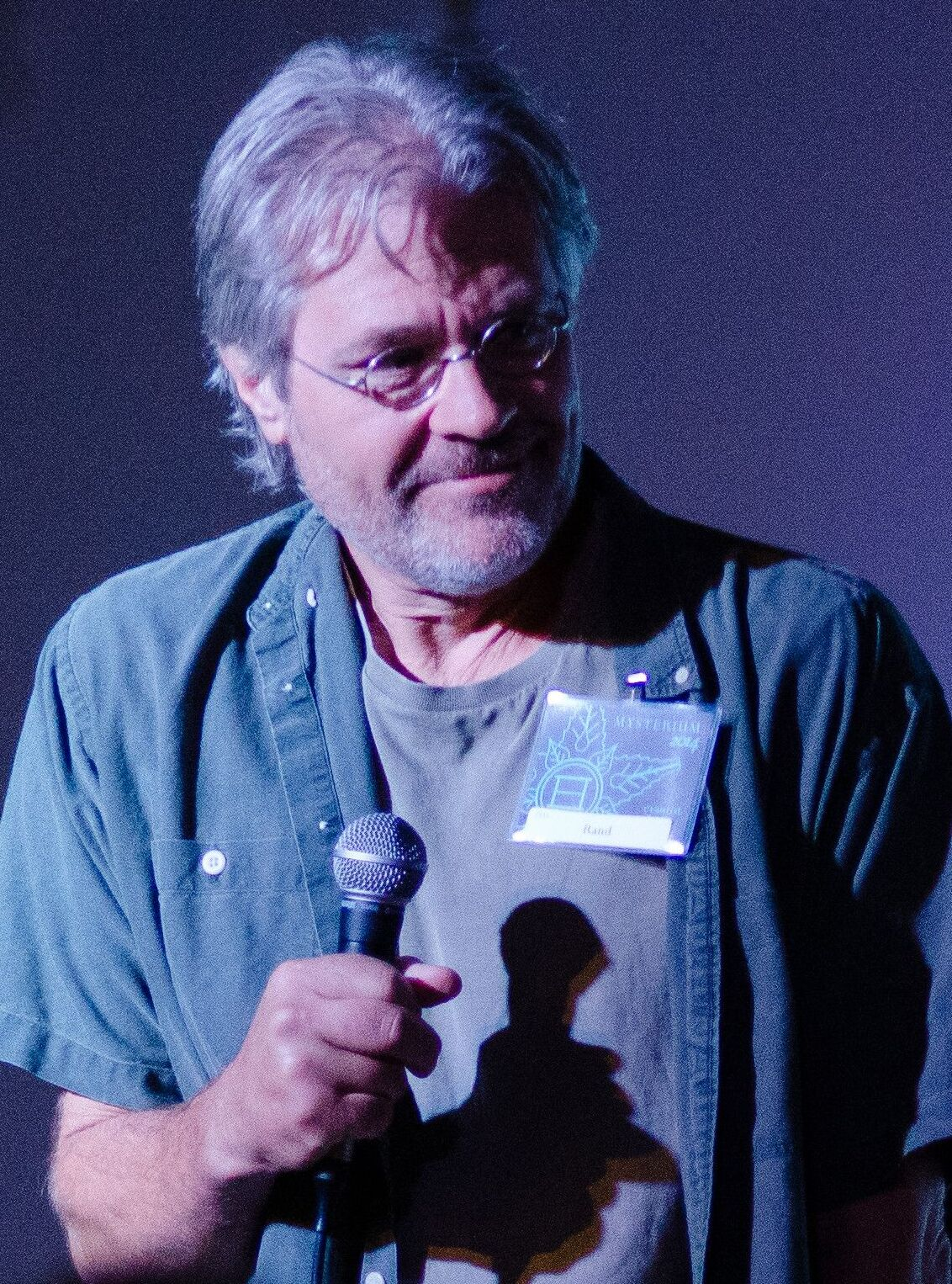
- Miller in 2014
- Born: January 17, 1959 (age 67); Cheltenham, Pennsylvania, U.S.
- Occupations: Co-founder and CEO of Cyan, Inc.
- Children: 3
- Relatives: Robyn Miller (Brother)

Rand Miller (born January 17, 1959) is an American businessman and video game developer who is the CEO and co-founder of Cyan Worlds (originally Cyan). He and his brother Robyn Miller became famous due to the success of their computer game Myst, which remained the all-time best-selling computer game from its release in 1993 until that record was surpassed by The Sims nearly a decade later. Rand also worked on the game's sequel, Riven, and later reprised his role as protagonist Atrus in Myst III: Exile; realMyst; Uru; Myst IV: Revelation; and Myst V: End of Ages. He also co-authored Myst novels The Book of Atrus, The Book of Ti'ana, and The Book of D'ni.

He remains the C.E.O. of Cyan Worlds.

== Career ==
Before the success of Myst, Rand and Robyn Miller released The Manhole, Spelunx, and Cosmic Osmo and the Worlds Beyond the Mackerel.

Miller, his brother, and the company they founded came to international prominence with the success of Myst in 1993 and its sequel Riven in 1997, both of which broke sales records.

Following the success of Myst and Riven, Miller spent nearly seven years spearheading the development of Uru: Ages Beyond Myst, an online massively multiplayer extension of the Myst franchise. Miller noted that "the essence of Uru was people love to explore and the fault in the one-off games is you get to explore until it stops. Well, what if it didn't stop? What if the worlds continued?"

Upon its release in 2003, Uru was a commercial failure. Online services were ceased by original publisher Ubisoft in 2004. Despite this earlier setback, Cyan Worlds announced in Los Angeles at E3 2006 that they would be partnering with GameTap to bring Uru Live online again. On February 15, 2007, Myst Online: Uru Live was released. However, this version also failed to attain sufficient popularity and was shut down in 2008.

Uru's failure caused Cyan Worlds to briefly cease operations.

Miller appeared shocked by Uru Live's ultimate failure, as reflected in his letter to the Uru Live community, which he wrote to explain why the game had to be shut down for an indefinite amount of time. In a previous interview, Miller had stated that finance from outside investment, not technology, was the reason for the failed project: "I think the biggest failure was running out of money, and thus running out of time, and thus losing control of our own destiny. No matter what promises are made or common goals are agreed upon, whoever pays the bills has the final say."

On October 17, 2013, Miller announced the development of Obduction, intended to serve as the spiritual successor to the Myst series, via a Kickstarter campaign. The game was released in 2016 (for PC) and 2017 (for Mac OS). Reviews for Obduction were largely positive.

== Personal life ==
Miller lives in Spokane, Washington, and has a wife, Debbie, three daughters, and two stepdaughters.
