= Myst Online: Uru Live =

2007 video game

- Logo of Myst Online
- Developer: Cyan Worlds
- Publishers: Ubisoft (2003–2004); Cyan Worlds (2004–2007: Until Uru); GameTap (2007–2008); Cyan Worlds (2010–present)
- Composer: Tim Larkin
- Series: Myst
- Engine: CyanWorlds.com Engine (CWE) (based on Plasma 2.0); PhysX
- Platforms: Microsoft Windows, Mac OS X
- Release: GameTap; February 15, 2007 (Discontinued February 4, 2008) (Service ended April 10, 2008); Cyan Worlds; February 8, 2010
- Genres: MMORPG, First-person adventure/third-person adventure, puzzle
- Mode: Multiplayer

Myst Online: Uru Live is an open source massively multiplayer online adventure game developed by Cyan Worlds. The game is the multiplayer component to the 2003 video game Uru: Ages Beyond Myst. Like Uru, Myst Online takes place in 2000s New Mexico, where an ancient civilization known as the D'ni once thrived. The D'ni had the ability to create portals to other worlds or Ages by writing descriptive books of the Age. Players uncover clues and solve puzzles together; plot developments were added via episodic content updates.

Uru's multiplayer segment was delayed and only shipped with the single-player component initially; in February 2004 the multiplayer was scrapped entirely. Dedicated fans kept an unsupported version of the game alive through Cyan-maintained servers. Online game distributor GameTap resurrected the game as Myst Online in 2007, but this version was canceled due to a lack of subscribers despite generally positive reviews. Cyan received the rights to Myst Online from GameTap and announced its intention to bring the game back.

In 2010, Cyan Worlds released the game free of charge, under the name MO:ULagain, and later released Myst Online's client and 3ds Max plugin under the GNU GPL v3 license.

== Gameplay ==
Screenshot of a group of players standing in one of the many "Neighborhoods"

Myst Online's gameplay is a massively multiplayer online game, where players interact with others to solve puzzles and advance the story. Players communicate with others using a "Ki", an artifact which provides a special interface. Each player has their own personal Age, called Relto; unlike in public areas, each player's Relto is different depending on the player's tastes. In public areas, any action a player takes is persistent and remains part of that world — kick a stone in one player's game, for instance, and the stone will be moved when any other player enters the area.

Myst Online takes place in fictitious caverns below Earth's surface. Thousands of years ago, a race known as the D'ni practiced a craft known as The Art. By writing special books describing a location, the D'ni created a link to that world. The D'ni had their own number system and language distinct from the humans dwelling above them. According to the story, archeologists much later discovered the caverns and teamed with a development studio (Cyan Worlds) to produce educational video games based on their findings; thus, the story in the Myst games is canonically findings from the caverns. New content and additions to the story were revealed through "episodes".

== Development ==
After completing Riven—the sequel to the bestselling Myst—in 1997, developer Rand Miller and his company, Cyan Worlds, began development of what would become Uru: Ages Beyond Myst. Initially, the game was to have been called Myst Online and have been a multiplayer-only title, but game publisher Ubisoft pushed for a single-player dimension. The online component, called Uru Live, did not ship with Ages Beyond Myst; in 2004, Uru Live was suspended entirely. In 2006, Cyan developed a stand-in for Uru Live, called Until Uru; this replacement was hosted by players in servers known as "shards", and did not have content updates or official support.

=== GameTap ===
On May 9, 2006, Cyan Worlds and GameTap announced at the Electronic Entertainment Expo that Myst Online: Uru Live would be returning in the holiday season of 2006. The GameTap version did not require any physical purchase: all the game content was downloaded through GameTap, which was subscribed to for a monthly fee. A major reason for the resurrection of the game was the fan support. According to GameTap's vice president of content Ricardo Sanchez, "One of the reasons [GameTap was] so attracted to Uru Live is that it had this persistent group that kept it alive during the dark days of it not being a product." Closed public beta testing of Myst Online: Uru Live began in August 2006. A period of semi-open beta testing lasted from December 12 to 18, 2006, with an open beta beginning on December 20. On January 18, 2007, it was announced that a Macintosh port of the game was being developed by TransGaming; a beta became available soon after. This coincided with the release of the first new Age, Eder Delin. GameTap brought Myst Online: Uru Live online in February 2007. On May 19, 2007, Myst Online made the move to episodic content releases, with each episode adding new Ages, puzzles, and a plot continuation. It was also released for Mac OS X, the first GameTap game for the platform.

In February 2008, GameTap announced that Myst Online was canceled. Sanchez released a statement that "The decision was a very difficult one and was made for business reasons rather than due to any issues regarding the design and vision of the amazing world that Cyan Worlds and Rand Miller have brought to us. Despite the great Myst Online experience coming to a close, Cyan is still a very valued partner of GameTap, we are on excellent terms, and we look forward to continuing our relationship in the future."

Various explanations for Uru Live's continuing troubles were given. Game designer Ernest Adams stated that "An important part of Myst's atmosphere came from being alone in a very strange place." Adams stated that the realities of online play distracted from the fantasy setting. When asked about the game's commercial failure, Miller responded:

I'm always going to fall back on 'we were ahead of our time,' because it's easy. The biggest thing we did was an all or nothing proposal from an entertainment point of view. It's not like you can start up a new TV network and give one show a month and expect it to be successful ... We couldn't quite pull that off with the money we had."

GameTap parent Turner Broadcasting's product development vice president Blake Lewin added that he did not believe any budget would have worked, due to the difficult content production pipeline. Lewin compared the game's production to the television series Lost, which had difficulties producing a full season. In an article discussing the current state of the adventure game genre, IGN writers Steve Butts and Charles Onyett considered the major issues with Myst Online that while a different kind of adventure game, Myst Online was not accessible to players other than the "hardcore faithful". The authors suggested that the franchise needed "to try something more dramatic than slapping an online architecture onto a game that already released, then periodically putting out small content updates."

=== MORE and Uru Live Again ===
After several months of negotiations, Cyan regained the rights to Myst Online for no charge. Miller stated that Cyan was committed to resurrecting Myst Online once again, giving fans the chance to interact with and create content. The new version of Myst Online was dubbed the "Myst Online Restoration Experiment" or MORE, and Cyan planned to reopen the game on their own servers without new content; instead, tools would be released for fans to create new content. Cyan put forward a tentative outline, which started with Cyan running MORE servers, the restructuring of the MystOnline.com web site, the release of MORE tools to players, and the delegation of approving fan-made content given to groups known as "Guilds". The ultimate goal was a continuation of the storyline and new content, with or without fan aid.

MORE was postponed after revenue to Cyan was disrupted and the company was forced to lay off all but seven employees in November 2008. The company announced that Myst Online's source code and tools would be given to the fans, making MORE an open-source project. On February 8, 2010, Cyan Worlds announced the return of Myst Online under the new title Myst Online: URU Live Again or MOULa. The game was made free to play, with donations contributing towards operating costs. The game was open-sourced, and Cyan released unfinished assets to the community, and starting in 2020 incorporated fan-made Ages as official content.

== Reception ==
Myst Online was generally well received by critics. The game has average critic scores of 77% and 83% at aggregate sites Metacritic and GameRankings, respectively. The Ages' varied visuals and strong aesthetic design were praised, as were the ambient sounds and music. The world that persistently changes depending on player actions was also lauded as more sophisticated than other MMOs.

Complaints from Uru: Ages Beyond Myst carried over to Myst Online; for example, Robert Washburne of JustAdventure found that the interface was still clunky. Charles Onyett of IGN said that those who had played through the previous Uru content would not find many changes: "As a result, Myst veterans uninterested in plugging through Uru's content again will be left with a dearth of things to actually do, shifting the onus of gameplay creation to the community." Onyett continued that the only reason to subscribe to the game was the dedicated fan community and the potential for the game to expand. Sarah Borger of GamesRadar noted that most puzzles could be completed without the help of other players, making the game "a pretty chat room".
