= Chung Kuo (novel series) =

Science fiction novel series by David Wingrove

Chung Kuo is a series of science fiction novels written by David Wingrove. The novels present a future history of an Earth dominated by China.

== Setting ==
Chung Kuo is primarily set 200 years in the future in mile-high, continent-spanning cities made of a super-plastic called 'ice'. Housing a global population of 40 billion, the cities are divided into 300 levels and success and prestige is measured by how far above the ground one lives. Some – in the Above – live in great comfort. Others – in the Lowers – live in squalor, whilst at the bottom of the pile is 'Below the Net', a place where the criminal element is exiled and left to rot. Beneath the cities lie the ruins of old Earth – the Clay – a lightless, stygian hell in which, astonishingly, humans still exist. These divisions are known as 'the world of levels'.

In addition to the world of levels, there are large meat-animal pens and sprawling, vast plantations to feed the population. There is also activity beyond Earth. The ruling classes – who base their rule on the customs and fashions of imperial China – maintain traditional palaces and courts both on Earth and in geostationary orbit. There are also Martian research bases and the outer colonies, with their mining planets.

== Storyline ==
At the very heart of Chung Kuo is the 'War of Two Directions' — a struggle for the destiny of Mankind and the clash of two different ideologies. For the planet's hereditary rulers, the T'angs, the goal is stability and security, at the expense of individual freedoms if necessary, while a commercially orientated faction desires change and the uncharted challenge of the new — even though loosening constraints on an over-populated planet could be lethal. Political tensions between the two factions lead to assassination, biological and nano-technological terrorism, and ultimately to war and the outright destruction of whole cities.

The story is told through the eyes of a wide variety of characters from all levels of society: Triad bosses and assassins, emperors and artists, courtesans and soldiers, scientists and thieves, terrorists and princes. By the end of the series the dramatis personae total several hundred characters — most of them dead by that point in the storyline.

== Publication history ==
Originally published between 1988 and 1999, Wingrove planned the series as nine books (three trilogies), but after publication of the seventh volume Wingrove's publisher insisted that the series be concluded in the next (eighth) volume, Marriage of the Living Dark.

In February 2011 Corvus / Atlantic Books began a re-release of the entire Chung Kuo saga, recasting it as twenty books with approximately 500,000 words of new material. This includes two brand new prequel novels, Son of Heaven (released February. 2011 in e-book and March 2011 in hardback) and Daylight on Iron Mountain and a significant restructuring of the end of the series to reflect Wingrove's original intentions. The two prequels cover events between 2045 and 2100 AD, telling the story of China's rise to power. In 2014, the re-release was discontinued after eight volumes.

On October 25, 2016, Wingrove announced that the publishing rights for the series had reverted to the author and that he planned to self-publish the entire 20-book series starting in 2017. Wingrove was diagnosed with Lewy body dementia in June of 2026 during the preparation for release of book 15, China on the Rhine. His wife stated that his outlines exist but it will be impossible for Wingrove to complete the series.

=== Original release ===
- The Middle Kingdom (1989)
- The Broken Wheel (1990)
- The White Mountain (1992)
- The Stone Within (1993)
- Beneath the Tree of Heaven (1994)
- White Moon, Red Dragon (1994)
- Days of Bitter Strength (1997)
- The Marriage of the Living Dark (1999)

=== Corvus re-release ===
The twenty books in the re-release schedule were planned to be published at regular intervals between February 2011 and June 2015. After The White Mountain was published, the publishers discontinued the series because of poor sales.

1. Son of Heaven (February 2011)
2. Daylight on Iron Mountain (November 2011)
3. The Middle Kingdom (August 2012)
4. Ice and Fire (December 2012)
5. The Art of War (March 2013)
6. An Inch of Ashes (July 2013)
7. The Broken Wheel (November 2013)
8. The White Mountain (March 2014)

=== Self-published re-release ===
The first eight books of the re-release were self-published 22 June 2017 by Fragile Books publishing company, with later books published sporadically. The books are usually available as ebooks and physical copies.

1. Son of Heaven (published 22 June 2017)
2. Daylight on Iron Mountain (published 22 June 2017)
3. The Middle Kingdom (published 22 June 2017)
4. Ice and Fire (published 22 June 2017)
5. The Art of War (published 22 June 2017)
6. An Inch of Ashes (published 22 June 2017)
7. The Broken Wheel (published 22 June 2017)
8. The White Mountain (published 22 June 2017)
9. Monsters of the Deep (published 19 October 2017)
10. The Stone Within (published 20 September 2018)
11. Upon a Wheel of Fire (published 15 November 2019)
12. Beneath the Tree of Heaven (published 2 July 2020 in UK)
13. Song of the Bronze Statue (published 29 Sep 2022 in UK)
14. White Moon Red Dragon (published 25 Apr 2024 in UK)
15. China on the Rhine
16. Days of Bitter Strength
17. The Father of Lies
18. Blood and Iron
19. King of Infinite Space
20. The Marriage of the Living Dark

== Reception ==
Reviews of the original eight-book series praised its scope and detailed worldbuilding, comparing it to Frank Herbert's Dune series, James Clavell's Shōgun and Isaac Asimov's Foundation series. The Washington Post declared the series was "one of the masterpieces of the decade". However, in 1990, The New York Times felt that Wingrove's vision of a Chinese-dominated future was unlikely and "ungrounded in historical process". One reviewer felt the final volume was so "nigh-incomprehensible" that it warranted a review of "a fake concluding novel".
