= Uru: Ages Beyond Myst =

2003 video game

- The box art to the initial release of Uru shows the player's personal Age, Relto.
- Developer: Cyan Worlds
- Publisher: Ubisoft
- Composer: Tim Larkin
- Series: Myst
- Engine: Plasma 2.0; Havok
- Platform: Windows
- Release: NA: November 11, 2003; EU: November 14, 2003
- Genres: Adventure, puzzle, massively multiplayer online game
- Modes: Single-player, multiplayer

Uru: Ages Beyond Myst is an adventure video game developed by Cyan Worlds and published by Ubisoft. Released in 2003, the title is the fourth game in the Myst canon. Departing from previous games of the franchise, Uru takes place in the modern era and allows players to customize their onscreen avatars. Players use their avatars to explore the abandoned city of an ancient race known as the D'ni, uncover story clues and solve puzzles.

Cyan began developing Uru shortly after completing Riven in 1997, leaving future Myst sequels to be produced by third-party developers. Uru required five years and $12 million to complete. Uru was initially conceived as a multiplayer game; the single-player portion was released, but the multiplayer component, Uru Live, was delayed, released, and then eventually canceled. The online video game service GameTap re-released the multiplayer portion of Uru as Myst Online: Uru Live in February 2007, but the service was canceled again the following year due to a lack of subscribers. GameTap passed the rights to Uru Live back to Cyan, who re-launched the game for free in 2010.

Uru was not as well received as previous Myst titles. Critics admired the visuals and new features of the game but criticized the lack of multiplayer in the retail version and clunky controls. Compared to previous games in the series, which had sold millions of units, Uru's sales were considered disappointing. The game was a critical and commercial disappointment for Cyan, causing the company financial troubles; nevertheless, it has attracted a cult following.

== Gameplay ==
Uru is a departure from previous Myst games in that it takes place from a third-person view and uses real-time rendering in contrast to pre-rendered environments.

Uru: Ages Beyond Myst is a puzzle-adventure game that takes place in worlds known as Ages. Gameplay can be viewed from first- and third-person perspectives, a departure from other Myst titles. Players navigate Ages from the third-person perspective, but can switch to the first-person view for closer inspection of clues and objects. Players in Uru can neither pick up objects nor carry an inventory of items; puzzle items must be pushed or kicked into place. The onscreen interface is minimal, having no health meters, maps, or compasses to distract from exploration.

Players create their own avatars when beginning the game. Different skin tones, facial features, clothing, and hairstyles are available for customizing these player representations. Players also receive a special linking book, a volume that serves as a portal to a personal world or Age, known as Relto. The main objective of the game is to explore and restore power to other Ages; players must also find seven "journey cloths". These cloths serve as save points in lieu of a game-saving option; characters are transported to the last cloth they touched when they restart. As in previous Myst games, player characters cannot die. For example, falling off a cliff sends characters back to Relto. The personal Age serves as a hub in Uru, containing a bookshelf with linking books to Ages players have explored, as well as avatar customization options and game information.

During the course of the game, players uncover clues about the D'ni, an ancient civilization, and the archeological group dedicated to learning more about them, the D'ni Restoration Council. Aspects of the D'ni civilization such as social structure, marriage, and how Ages came about are also imparted as players progress through the Ages. Players may collect Relto pages, which offer cosmetic customization to the player's personal Age—for example, making it rain or adding a waterfall.

Uru was originally to ship with a massively multiplayer online component, which was delayed and never integrated into the retail release. Initially branded Uru Live, the multiplayer portion was designed to allow two or more players to work together to overcome obstacles or complete puzzles. Players would be able to chat in real time and cooperate in specially designed puzzles. In previews of the multiplayer component, there were three distinct types of Ages. The personal Age provided links to other Ages, which were unlocked by solving puzzles in prerequisite worlds. Neighborhood Ages were analogous to an invite-only party, and City Ages provided places for players to congregate; IGN called the Age "a giant lounge".

== Plot ==
Uru takes place many years after the events of Myst IV: Revelation. Unlike previous games in the series, Uru's story mixes secondary world elements with Earth events. According to the game's fictional history, archeologists found an entrance to a vast cave system in the 1980s near a volcano in New Mexico. The caves led to an ancient abandoned city built by the enigmatic D'ni civilization. The D'ni practiced an ancient ability known as the Art. By writing a description of another world, the D'ni created "linking books" that served as portals to the worlds described, known as Ages. Soon after making contact with a single human, the entire civilization suddenly disappeared two hundred years ago. In Uru's story, the video game Myst was created when the archeological leaders approached a development studio, Cyan, and asked them to create a game to educate the public about the D'ni. Myst sold millions of copies, and Cyan continued to produce games based on D'ni findings. In the present day, a group known as the D'ni Restoration Council or DRC reopens the passages to the D'ni caverns and begins to rebuild the abandoned cities.

Players begin Uru's story in New Mexico near the Cleft, a deep fissure in the ground near the entrance to the D'ni caverns. A man who introduces himself as Zandi sits in front of his trailer by the Cleft, encouraging the player to discover the environment and join the exploration. The player stumbles across a hologram of a woman, Yeesha, who tells the story of the D'ni and requests help to rebuild the civilization.

== Development ==
Cyan Worlds began development on its next project after the company finished 1997's Riven, the sequel to the bestselling Myst. The game that became Uru would take more than five years and $12 million to complete. While under development, Uru was codenamed DIRT ("D'ni in real time"), then MUDPIE (for "Multi-User DIRT, Persistent / Personal Interactive Entertainment / Experience / Exploration / Environment"). Uru was officially announced as Myst Online, before being renamed Uru in early 2003. Myst co-creator Rand Miller released a statement along with an outline of the game:

Uru is a revolutionary adventure game that takes the best qualities of the Myst franchise and makes them even better. The single-player experience will eclipse the beauty, grandeur, and mind-challenging elements of previous titles. Plus, with the option to join a constantly updated online universe, the adventure never has to end. From new machines and puzzles to special events and entirely new Ages, players will find more to do, more to see, and more to explore each time they return—and this time, they can discover everything with old and new friends.

Miller considered Uru a major departure from Myst and Riven in that Cyan wanted to create a persistent world, where actions occurred while the player was not online. Miller did not consider the game a true massively multiplayer online game, saying "there is not leveling and skills and monsters and experience in any artificial sense. The 'leveling' is finding and exploring and owning new Ages that are released regularly; the experience is what you really learn while exploring that will help you later—not points on a scale." Miller considered there to be two benefits to such a system: firstly that players would care more about being part of the story, and secondly that even new players could make discoveries and be part of the community. The game was designed as more of a spin-off than a sequel to previous Myst games, due to the merging of items from the contemporary (traffic cones and T-shirts) to the fantastic (books that transport the user to new worlds).

The game was originally conceived as a multiplayer-only game, where players could meet and solve new puzzles that would be added monthly. At the request of publisher Ubisoft, Cyan eventually developed a single-player portion as well. Cyan announced players would be invited to participate in a multiplayer beta test, which drew 10,000 to 40,000 participants. Uru was released in November 2003, while the multiplayer portion was delayed. Small groups of players were allowed to come online to test the multiplayer part of the game, and journalists were told they would be invited to play soon after, but Uru Live was canceled before being released. Cyan stated that there were not enough projected subscribers to support the service.

=== Expansion packs and Uru: Complete Chronicles ===
After Uru's release and Uru Live's demise, Cyan announced that new content would be added via expansion packs. The first, Uru: To D'ni, added the never-released Uru Live online content, thus focusing on the past of the D'ni. Uru: The Path of the Shell extended the story of Uru in the present and added multiple never-before-seen Ages. Unlike the first expansion pack, Uru: The Path of the Shell was not free, but was boxed and sold in stores. Uru, To D'ni and The Path of the Shell were also packaged together and sold as Uru: Complete Chronicles.

=== Audio ===
Uru's music was composed by Tim Larkin, who had started his career at game publisher Brøderbund, and lobbied hard to be included on Riven's development team. Larkin worked on creating different sound effects for Riven and was chosen to score Uru after composer and Myst co-creator Robyn Miller left Cyan in early 1998. The music for the game was collected as a soundtrack, Uru Music, that was released in 2003. The game also feature the song Burn You Up, Burn You Down performed by Peter Gabriel used as the official theme song for the game.

Larkin chose the instrumentation for each track based on the various digital environments in the game. When the player is in the game's representation of New Mexico, for example, Larkin used a resonator guitar and flutes, creating what he called something "indigenous to a southwest type of feel that's very contemporary". In other areas Larkin described the game's music as being "less typical than you would find in most games" because of the exotic landscape the developers had created. To create contemporary and exotic types of music in the game, Larkin employed a combination of real and synthesized instruments. Sometimes Larkin replaced synthesized performances with those of real musicians, as in the track "Gallery Theme", where a synthesized vocal part was eventually discarded in favor of soprano Tasha Koontz. To create an exotic feel, Larkin used a group of Maasai tribesmen's chanting, who were recorded during their visit to Spokane, Washington, where Cyan Worlds was located at that time.

The Uru soundtrack received two Game Audio Network Guild (G.A.N.G.) nominations in 2004—one for "Best Original Vocal Song (Choral)" for the "Gallery Theme" (which won), and another for "Best Original Soundtrack." Beyond its use in Uru, "Gallery Theme" was later used in the theatrical trailer for Steven Spielberg's film, Munich. The Uru soundtrack comes on an enhanced CD, containing a (nearly) four-minute music video called "Uru: The Makers" and an audio-only interview with Rand Miller and Tim Larkin.

Uru Music track list
| No. | Title | Length |
|---|---|---|
| 1. | "Atrus Open" | 1:07 |
| 2. | "Beyond Gira" | 5:51 |
| 3. | "Out of the Hive" | 3:05 |
| 4. | "Badlands" | 2:31 |
| 5. | "Gallery Theme" | 2:54 |
| 6. | "Air Stream" | 4:11 |
| 7. | "Yeesha's Theme" | 3:48 |
| 8. | "Convergence" | 2:58 |
| 9. | "The Well" | 3:27 |
| 10. | "Spore Me" | 2:41 |
| 11. | "Baron's Theme" | 2:16 |
| 12. | "The Library" | 1:35 |
| 13. | "The Vault" | 6:15 |
| 14. | "Trailer Music" | 2:26 |
| 15. | "Fall of D'ni" | 3:06 |
| 16. | "The Bahro" | 1:52 |
| 17. | "Dirt" | 2:07 |
| Total length: | | 50:50 |

=== Uru Live ===
To compensate for the cancellation of Uru Live, Cyan published all the developed online content as single-player expansion packs. Meanwhile, a small group of dedicated fans, many of them the Uru Live beta testers, were allowed to maintain their unofficial servers, called "shards". Cyan released binaries of the original Uru Live servers under the banner Until Uru and coordinated with the fan shards so that players could verify their authentication keys, necessary to play the game. The shards were often unstable and no new content was released; rather, they provided a place for fans to socialize. In February 2006, Cyan opened their own official shard, called D'mala, open at no charge to Uru owners, though an invitation from the community was required. Miller revealed in a letter to fans that Cyan had received "limited funding from a third party that allows us to breathe some refreshing new life and optimism into all things Uru." As with the fan-operated servers, D'mala would feature no new content, instead allowing Cyan staff called "surveyors" to interact with fans and gather information.

In April 2006, GameTap announced it was relaunching Uru Live as Myst Online: Uru Live. A major reason for the resurrection of the game was the fan support. According to GameTap's vice president of content Ricardo Sanchez, "One of the reasons [GameTap was] so attracted to Uru Live is that it had this persistent group that kept it alive during the dark days of its absence." While Cyan devoted its time to Myst Online, it promised not to shut down Until Uru in the meantime, although it would offer no new authentication keys. GameTap released Myst Online in February 2007. A Macintosh version, using the Cider translation layer engine so that Intel-processor Macs did not need a Windows installation to run the game, was released in March. At the time, Myst Online was the only Mac-compatible game on GameTap. New content for the game was released in the form of online "episodes", adding new Ages, puzzles, and plot continuation with each episode. For business reasons, GameTap announced in February 2008 that the game would go offline in April; Cyan reacquired the rights to the game and announced that it would give the Myst Online source code and tools to the fans, making the game an open-source project. In 2010, Cyan Worlds released the game free of charge, under the name Myst Online: Uru Live again (MO:ULagain). It is currently hosted on Cyan-maintained servers.

In 2011, Cyan Worlds and OpenUru.org announced the release of Myst Online's client and 3ds Max plugin under the GNU GPL v3 license.

== Reception ==
Uru: Ages Beyond Myst

Aggregate scores
| Aggregator | Score |
|---|---|
| GameRankings | 76.19% |
| Metacritic | 79/100 |

Review scores
| Publication | Score |
|---|---|
| Game Informer | 8.25/10 |
| GameSpot | 7.8/10 |
| GameSpy | 3/5 |
| IGN | 9.0/10 |

Initial reception to Uru was generally positive, but less so than previous games in the series. The game has average critic scores of 79/100 and 76.19% from aggregate web sites Metacritic and GameRankings, respectively. Though Uru was a departure from previous Myst titles, the differences were usually praised. Game Informer's Lisa Mason said Uru "successfully updated" the adventure game genre. The visuals and music were highly praised, and GameZone called the world of the D'ni beautifully rendered and brilliantly designed. Newspapers appreciated the contrast Uru offered from violence-filled contemporary games.

The game's third-person controls and the addition of instant failures by falling were not well received. Denise Cook of Computer Gaming World called the third person option "choked" and "quirky". While Cook appreciated the added depth and immersion provided by the real-time rendering, she found incidents such as slipping off rocks, falling into lava, and plummeting into canyons irksome additions to the previously stress-free Myst formula. GameSpy's Carla Harker found several puzzles highly difficult solely due to the poorly implemented control scheme which "never becomes intuitive". Computer Gaming World's Robert Coffey and Cook considered the plot of the single-player release minimal and forgettable.

A major critic complaint about Uru was that the game did not ship with the multiplayer component. GameSpot's Andrew Park questioned why the game shipped with the multiplayer element open only for select players when the component had previously been beta-tested. GameSpy was disappointed that the feature advertised on the box and in the game manual was not available in the product. Reviewer Bob Mandel found that the most disappointing part of the dropped multiplayer game was that "as you progress through the game, a number of tantalizing clues emerge of places you can go and activities you can undertake only through the promised online mode."

Uru's sales were considered disappointing, whereas the first three Myst games had sold more than 12 million units collectively before Uru's release. Among computer games, The NPD Group ranked Uru ninth for the weeks ending November 22 and December 6, and 13th for the month of December 2003 overall. In North America, the game sold 78,329 units during 2003, and another 18,860 during the first two months of 2004. Although it sold between 100,000 and 400,000 copies in the United States by August 2006, it was beaten by Myst III: Exile's sales in the region. Time magazine pointed to Uru's relative failure as evidence the franchise had lost its touch, a notion the developers of Myst IV: Revelation sought to dispel. Uru's poor sales were also considered a factor in financially burdening Cyan, contributing to the company's near-closure in 2005. The title's original graphics and story nevertheless attracted a cult following.

Uru: Ages Beyond Myst won PC Gamer US's 2003 "Best Adventure Game" and "Best Sound" awards. The magazine's Chuck Osborn called it "the future of the genre" and "an exhilarating innovation". Computer Games Magazine presented Uru with its "Best Art Direction" award, for which it tied with Tron 2.0. The game was nominated in The Electric Playground's "Best Adventure Game for PC" category, but lost this prize to Beyond Good & Evil. It also received a nomination for "Computer Action/Adventure Game of the Year" at the AIAS' 7th Annual Interactive Achievement Awards, but was ultimately given to Prince of Persia: The Sands of Time.
