= Cosmic Osmo's Hex Isle =

2007 puzzle adventure video game

- Cover art for the game.
- Developer: Cyan Worlds
- Publisher: Fanista
- Series: Cosmic Osmo and the Worlds Beyond the Mackerel
- Engine: Plasma 3.0
- Platforms: Windows, Mac OS X, Xbox 360 (XBLA)
- Release: November 30, 2007
- Genre: Puzzle game
- Mode: Single player

Cosmic Osmo's Hex Isle is a 3D puzzle/adventure game for Mac and Windows by Cyan Worlds and Fanista released on November 30, 2007. It is a sequel to the adventure game Cosmic Osmo and the Worlds Beyond the Mackerel, also by Cyan Worlds. Osmo has been incarcerated because of his extreme laziness. The aim is to help Osmo escape from his prison by touching a set of coloured hexagonal targets on each level.
