= The Manhole =

1988 video game

- Cover art for The Manhole: CD-ROM Masterpiece Edition
- Developer: Cyan, Inc.
- Publishers: Broderbund; Activision
- Designers: Rand and Robyn Miller
- Engine: Multimedia Applications Development Environment
- Platforms: Mac OS, TurboGrafx 16, MS-DOS, FM Towns, Microsoft Windows, iOS
- Release: November 24, 1988, December 18, 1989, May 9, 1992, June 8, 1995, July 5, 2007 (Steam) (PC only): WW: August 18th, 2010; (GOG.com) (PC only): WW: Jan. 21, 2011; iOS: WW: August 7th, 2010
- Genre: Adventure
- Mode: Single-player

The Manhole is an adventure video game in which the player opens a manhole and reveals a gigantic beanstalk, leading to fantastic worlds.

== Development ==
The Manhole game world (original Mac release shown) emphasizes visual elements instead of written words.

The Manhole runs in black-and-white on Apple's Macintosh line of computers. It was created using the HyperTalk programming language by brothers Rand and Robyn Miller, who founded the company Cyan and would go on to produce the best-selling adventure game Myst.

== Release ==
The game was first released on floppy disks in 1988 by Cyan, Inc. (now Cyan Worlds) and distributed through mail order. In 1989, it was produced for Activision as a CD-ROM version based on the floppy disk game. This version was the first personal computer game distributed on CD-ROM (although there had already been two games released in late 1988 in Japan for NEC's PC Engine game console on its CD-ROM² format). The game was re-released for MS-DOS twice, once in 1992 by Activision as The Manhole: New and Enhanced (including a Windows 3.1 version) and again in 1995 as The Manhole: CD-ROM Masterpiece Edition by Broderbund, which featured the use of color, music, voice, sound effects, and some new characters. Cyan artist Chuck Carter designed all of the color graphics in about three months using StrataVision 3D. In 2007, the game was released on GameTap. As of February 2011, the game is available from GOG.com, iTunes, and as part of the "Cyan Complete Pack" on Steam.

The Manhole was released in Japan for the PC-Engine on March 22, 1991. The Manhole was also released for the FM Towns.

== Reception ==
Reception

Review score
Publication	Score
Famitsu	7/10, 9/10, 9/10, 8/10 (PC-Engine)

Describing The Manhole as "the first children's software to require a hard disk", Macworld in March 1989 stated that its "realistic sounds, the fantasy-filled graphics, and the stack construction are truly impressive". The magazine "highly recommended [the game] for young children[, and] it's hard to imagine a playful soul of any age who wouldn't enjoy exploring the mind-tickling world inside The Manhole".

The Manhole won a Software Publishers Association Excellence in Software Award in 1989 for Best New Use of a Computer.
