= Pre-rendering =

Process in which video footage is not rendered in real-time

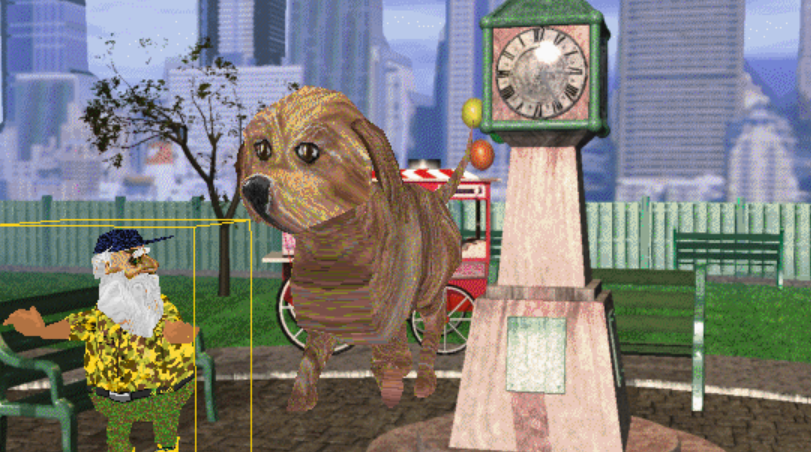
Low-poly characters are rendered in real time and composited on top of higher-poly, pre-rendered backgrounds in 3D Movie Maker.

In computer graphics, pre-rendering or offline rendering is the technique of rendering images before playing them back at a later time, often on another computer system. It is contrasted with real-time rendering, where images are rendered and displayed within a time constraint, usually quickly enough to produce the illusion of motion.

Since rendering is more computationally expensive than playing back pre-rendered images, pre-rendering can be used where real-time rendering is not computationally feasible. More powerful computer systems, or more rendering time, can be used to render images or video for playback on less powerful computer systems, or when time constraints are tighter. As a result, pre-rendering has applications in interactive computer graphics, such as in video games and in 3D animation software.

== Advantages ==
The advantage of pre-rendering is the ability to use graphic models that are more complex and computationally intensive than those that can be rendered in real-time, due to the possibility of using multiple computers over extended periods of time to render the end results. For instance, a comparison could be drawn between rail-shooters Maximum Force (which used pre-rendered 3D levels but 2D sprites for enemies) and Virtua Cop (using 3D polygons); Maximum Force was more realistic looking due to the limitations of Virtua Cop's 3D engine, but Virtua Cop has actual depth (able to portray enemies close and far away, along with body-specific hits and multiple hits) compared to the limits of the 2D sprite enemies in Maximum Force.

== Disadvantages ==
The disadvantage of pre-rendering, in the case of video game graphics, is a generally lower level of interactivity, if any, with the player. Another negative side of pre-rendered assets is that changes cannot be made during gameplay. A game with pre-rendered backgrounds is forced to use fixed camera angles, and a game with pre-rendered video generally cannot reflect any changes the game's characters might have undergone during gameplay (such as wounds or customized clothing) without having an alternate version of the video stored. This is generally not feasible due to the large amount of space required to store pre-rendered assets of high quality. However, in some advanced implementations, such as in Final Fantasy VIII, real-time assets were composited with pre-rendered video, allowing dynamic backgrounds and changing camera angles. Another problem is that a game with pre-rendered lighting cannot easily change the state of the lighting in a convincing manner.

== Usage ==
Pre-rendered graphics are used primarily as cutscenes in modern video games. The use of pre-rendered 3D computer graphics for video sequences date back to two arcade laserdisc video games introduced in late 1983: Interstellar, introduced by Funai at the AM Show in September, and Star Rider, introduced by Williams Electronics at the AMOA show in October.

The X68000 enhanced remake of Ys I: Ancient Ys Vanished, released in 1991, used 3D pre-rendered graphics for the boss sprites, though this ended up creating what is considered "a bizarre contrast" with the game's mostly 2D graphics. One of the first games to extensively use pre-rendered graphics along with full motion video was The 7th Guest. Released in 1993 as one of the first PC games exclusively on CD-ROM, the game was hugely popular, although reviews from critics were mixed. The game featured pre-rendered video sequences that were at a resolution of 640x320 at 15 frames per second, a feat previously thought impossible on personal computers. Shortly after, the release of Myst in 1993 made the use of pre-rendered graphics and CD-ROMs even more popular; most of the rendered work of Myst became the basis for the re-make realMyst: Interactive 3D Edition with its free-roaming real-time 3D graphics. The most graphically advanced use of entirely pre-rendered graphics in games is often claimed to be Myst IV: Revelation, released in 2004.

One of the first significant console games with pre-rendered graphics was Donkey Kong Country, released on the SNES in 1994.

The use of pre-rendered backgrounds and movies was also made popular by the Resident Evil and Final Fantasy franchises on the original PlayStation, both of which use pre-rendered backgrounds and movies extensively to provide a visual presentation that is far greater than the console can provide with real-time 3D. These games include real-time elements (characters, items, etc.) in addition to pre-rendered backgrounds to provide interactivity. Often, a game using pre-rendered backgrounds can devote additional processing power to the remaining interactive elements, resulting in a level of detail greater than the norm for the host platform. In some cases, the visual quality of the interactive elements is still far behind the pre-rendered backgrounds.

In the 1990s, when most 3D game engines had pre-calculated/fixed lightmaps and texture mapping, developers often turned to pre-rendered graphics which had a much higher level of realism. However, this has lost favor since the mid-2000s, as advances in consumer PC and video game console graphics have enabled the use of the game's own engine to render these cinematics. For instance, the id Tech 4 engine used in Doom 3 allowed bump mapping and dynamic per-pixel lighting, previously only found in pre-rendered videos.

Games such as Warcraft III: Reign of Chaos have used both types of cutscenes; pre-rendered for the beginning and end of a campaign, and the in-game engine for level briefings and character dialogue during a mission.

Some games also use 16-bit pre-rendered skyboxes, such as Half-Life (only in the GoldSrc version), Re-Volt, Quake II, and others.

CG movies such as Toy Story, Shrek and Final Fantasy: The Spirits Within are entirely pre-rendered.

== Other methods ==
Another increasingly common pre-rendering method is the generation of texture sets for 3D games, which are often used with complex real-time algorithms to simulate extraordinarily high levels of detail. While making Doom 3, id Software used pre-rendered models as the basis for generating normal, specular and diffuse lighting maps that simulate the detail of the original model in real-time.

Pre-rendered lighting is a technique that is losing popularity. Processor-intensive ray tracing algorithms can be used during a game's production to generate light textures, which are simply applied on top of the usual hand-drawn textures.

As the technology continued to advance in the mid-2000s, video game graphics were able to achieve the photorealism that was previously limited to pre-rendering, as seen in the growth of Machinima.

== See also ==
- Rendering (computer graphics)
- FMV game
- Matte painting
