= Robyn Miller =

American artist

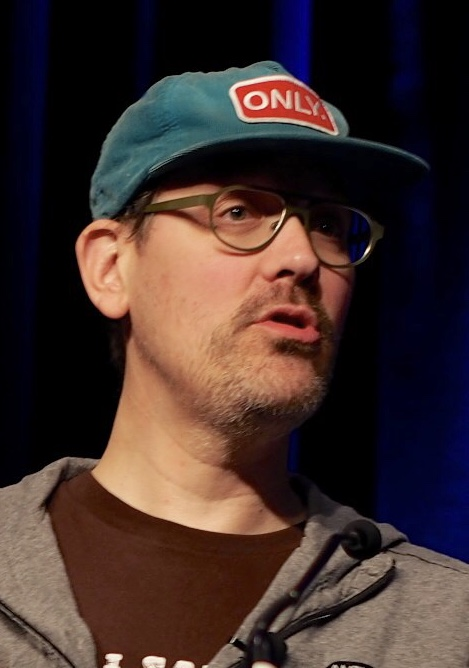
- Miller in 2013
- Born: August 6, 1966 (age 60); Dallas, Texas, U.S.
- Occupations: Artist, computer game designer, composer, director, actor
- Website: www.robynmiller.net

Robyn Charles Miller (born August 6, 1966) is an American video game designer who is the co-founder of Cyan Worlds with brother Rand Miller. He served as co-designer of the popular computer game Myst, which held the title of best-selling computer game from its release in 1993 until the release of The Sims seven years later. He also co-directed and co-lead designed the sequel to Myst, Riven, which was the best-selling computer game of its year of release, 1997. Miller composed and performed the soundtracks to both games. He also acted in Myst, portraying one of the antagonists, Sirrus (with brother and Cyan-cofounder Rand appearing as Achenar and Atrus). He co-wrote the first Myst novel, The Book of Atrus.

After the release of Riven, Miller left Cyan to pursue non-game interests, including films. He is the director of the 2013 film The Immortal Augustus Gladstone.

== Early works ==
Miller served as a designer on Cyan Worlds's early games The Manhole, Cosmic Osmo and the Worlds Beyond the Mackerel and Spelunx.

== Myst and Riven ==
Miller is known for his contributions in the areas of direction and design, especially in the area of visual design—the look and feel of the Myst and Riven worlds. Richard Vander Wende, co-director and co-designer of Riven, was likewise responsible for orchestrating the visual language of that world.

== Composer ==
While at Cyan, Miller composed the soundtracks for both Myst and Riven.

In 2005 he worked on a musical project named Ambo, with W. Keith Moore.

In December 2013, he released the soundtrack for his debut film The Immortal Augustus Gladstone in digital format on Gumroad.com.

Miller composed the soundtrack for Cyan's Kickstarter-funded video game Obduction, released in August 2016. This was his first work with Cyan since Riven in 1997. Initially, he had only intended to appear in the game itself (as C.W., one of the few human characters the player interacts with), and had outright said he would not do the soundtrack. After persuasion by his brother Rand, as well as seeing the work being done on the game, he eventually agreed to compose the game's music as well as appear in the game. He stated in an interview that he enjoyed focusing solely on composing, as opposed to the additional production work he had done for Myst and Riven.

From 2022 to 2023, Miller self-published a compilation series of three albums entitled Lost Tracks featuring various unreleased tracks composed and recorded over his career.

== Director ==
Miller's debut film project is a fictional documentary film titled The Immortal Augustus Gladstone, a story about a man who believes himself to be a vampire.

== Discography ==
Solo albums:

- Myst: The Soundtrack (1995)
- Riven: The Soundtrack (1998)
- The Immortal Augustus Gladstone - Soundtrack (2013)
- Obduction - Original Game Soundtrack (2016)
- Obduction Redacted - B Sides (EP, 2016)
- Little Potato (2017)
- Lost Tracks, Pt. I - Myst (2022)
- Lost Tracks, Pt. II (2022)
- Lost Tracks, Pt. III (2023)

As a member of Ambo:

- 1000 Years and 1 Day (2005)
- Ambo – Day Two - B-Sides (EP, 2005)

== Filmography ==
Video games
Year	Work	Credited as					Notes
Year	Work	Director	Designer	Artist	Composer	Actor	Notes
1988	The Manhole	Yes	Yes	Yes	—N/a	No	
1989	Cosmic Osmo and the Worlds Beyond the Mackerel	Yes	Yes	Yes	Yes	No	
1991	Spelunx and the Caves of Mr. Seudo	Yes	Yes	Yes	—N/a	No	
1993	Myst	Yes	Yes	Yes	Yes	Yes	Role: Sirrus (uncredited)
1997	Riven: The Sequel to Myst	Yes	Yes	No	Yes	No	
2016	Obduction	No	No	No	Yes	Yes	Role: C.W.

Film
Year	Film	Credited as					Notes
Year	Film	Director	Writer	Editor	Composer	Actor	Notes
2013	The Immortal Augustus Gladstone	Yes	Yes	Yes	Yes	Yes	Role: Augustus Gladstone
2013	The Hero Pose	No	Yes	Yes	No	No	Executive producer; short film
2015	Kill Cash Cow Kill	No	No	Yes	No	No	Short film
2017	Little Potato	No	Yes	No	Yes	No	Executive producer; short film

== See also ==
- List of ambient music artists
