= List of cancelled Sega Saturn games =

The Sega Saturn is a video game console by Sega. While Sega found success in its Sega Genesis in the early 1990s, the failure of the Sega CD and 32X hardware add-ons left them in need of moving on to new hardware. Concerned about the impending releases of Sony's first PlayStation console and Nintendo's N64, Sega rushed the Saturn to market in regions across late 1994 and 1995. While the platform performed moderately well with sales and third party support across 1995, particularly in Japan, momentum slowed in 1996 between the release of the Nintendo 64 and the cancellation of Sonic X-treme, the Saturn's only planned mainline Sonic game at the time. With momentum stalled, many games announced from 1996 onward, particularly from E3 1996, were eventually cancelled outright, released for PlayStation, Nintendo 64, and/or PC instead, or pushed back to launch on the Saturn's successor, the Dreamcast, which itself was rushed to market across 1998 and 1999. This list documents games that were confirmed for release for the Saturn at some point, but did not end up being released for it.

== Games ==
There are currently 178 games on this list. (Note: This number is always up to date by this script.)

List of cancelled Sega Saturn games
Title(s)	Notes/Reasons	Developer	Publisher
The 11th Hour	Originally released for Windows in 1995, the announced Saturn and 3DO versions never materialized.	Trilobyte	Virgin Interactive
3D Ultra Pinball	After its 1995 PC release, the pinball game was announced for a release on the Saturn the following year, and far enough along to have full-page advertisements run in Sega Saturn Magazine, but the Saturn version never materialized.	Dynamix	Sierra On-Line
A Bug's Life	A video game adaption of the 1998 film A Bug's Life was announced for the original PlayStation, Nintendo 64, Game Boy Color, Microsoft Windows, and the Saturn. While all other versions released across late 1998 and 1999, the Saturn version did not, due to its discontinuation that year in Western territories.	Traveller's Tales	Disney Interactive
Abuse	Originally released in 1996 on PC platforms, versions for the Saturn and PlayStation were announced at E3 1996, but never materialized.	Crack dot Com	Vic Tokai
Actua Golf 2	One of a series of sports games developed by Gremlin Interactive that was released across 1997 and 1998 for Windows and PlayStation, but the Saturn version was never released.	Gremlin Interactive	Gremlin Interactive
Actua Ice Hockey	One of a series of sports games developed by Gremlin Interactive that was released across 1997 and 1998 for Windows and PlayStation, but the Saturn version was never released.	Gremlin Interactive	Gremlin Interactive
Actua Soccer 2	One of a series of sports games developed by Gremlin Interactive that was released across 1997 and 1998 for Windows and PlayStation, but the Saturn version was never released.	Gremlin Interactive	Gremlin Interactive
Actua Tennis	One of a series of sports games developed by Gremlin Interactive that was released across 1997 and 1998 for Windows and PlayStation, but the Saturn version was never released.	Gremlin Interactive	Gremlin Interactive
Adidas Power Soccer	Originally developed by Psygnosis and released for the PlayStation, the game was ported to the Saturn by Perfect Entertainment, and reportedly finished, but never released.	Psygnosis, Perfect Entertainment	THQ
Air Nights	A sequel to Nights into Dreams (1996) based around motion-control. Entered development for both Saturn and later Dreamcast before being cancelled entirely.	Sega	Sega
Alien: Resurrection	Announced in 1997, its lengthy and difficult 3 year development cycle expanded beyond the Saturn's lifecycle, though it did eventually release on PlayStation and Windows in 2000.	Argonaut Games	Fox Interactive
Aliens Versus Predator	In 1995, a video game adaptation of the Alien vs. Predator crossover franchise was announced for release in 1997 for the original PlayStation, Saturn, and Microsoft Windows. The console version were in development into 1997, with the PlayStation version being present at E3 1997, but after delays, only the Windows version ever materialized when the game released in 1999. A Dreamcast version was later reported on by magazines, though it never materialized either.	Rebellion Developments	Fox Interactive
Angel	Present at E3 1996 as a game in development by Scavenger, Inc., the game never released, with Scavenger going bankrupt shortly after.	Scavenger, Inc.	Scavenger, Inc.
Aqua	Present at E3 1996 as a scuba diving game in development by Scavenger, Inc., the game never released, with Scavenger going bankrupt shortly after.	Scavenger, Inc.	Scavenger, Inc.
Armed	Announced at E3 1996, but never released. A prototype version leaked in 2017, featuring a largely completely version of the game.	Point of View	Interplay
Atomic Runner	A faithful port of the arcade game was planned for the Saturn. It was shown at the Tokyo Game Show, but was never released. A prototype version leaked in 2012, which was playable but missing major features, like sound effects.	Data East	Data East
Bad Mojo	A Saturn port was announced in 1996 shortly after the release of the Windows version, though the Saturn version was never shown or released.	Pulse Entertainment	Acclaim Entertainment
Barb Wire	Announced in 1997 as a video game adaption of the 1996 superhero movie of the same name, the game was not released on any of its announced platforms, Saturn included.	Cyro Interactive	GT Interactive
Batman & Robin	Saturn version was cancelled in 1997 as Acclaim Entertainment re-evaluated their support for the Saturn, though the PlayStation version still released later in 1998.	Probe Entertainment	Acclaim Entertainment
Bedlam	Saturn was listed as one of the platforms for the game's release, but the game only released for PlayStation and PC platforms in 1996.	Mirage Technologies	GT Interactive
Big Red Racing	After being released on PC in 1995, plans for console version were announced, though plans were not discussed after publisher Domark was acquired by Eidos Interactive, and no console versions were released, Saturn included.	Big Red Software	Domark
Blackthorne	Shortly after the game's initial release on SNES, publisher Interplay decided against a Sega Genesis port in favor of concentrating on more powerful hardware. Sega 32X, Saturn, and PlayStation versions were announced, though of those, only the 32X version released.	Blizzard Entertainment	Interplay Entertainment
Blue Stinger	After a year in development for the Saturn, publisher Sega asked for the game to be released on Dreamcast, causing development to restart in 1997. It released on the Dreamcast in 1999.	Climax Graphics	Sega
Blood Omen: Legacy of Kain	Originally scheduled for a fourth quarter 1995 release, delays and the game's extended 3.5 year development time lead to PlayStation and Windows releases across 1996 and 1997, but not on Saturn.	Crystal Dynamics	Activision
BloodStorm	Released in arcades in 1994, Saturn and PlayStation ports were announced, but not released for either platform.	Incredible Technologies	Strata
Broken Helix	Originally announced as Dark Helix at E3 1996, the game would only end up releasing on PlayStation across 1997 and 1998.	Konami	Konami
Bubsy 3D	Accolade planned to release a version for the Sega Saturn in 1997 after the game's 1996 PlayStation release, but it never materialized.	Eidetic	Accolade
Buggy	Originally scheduled for a late 1997 release alongside PlayStation and Windows version, the Saturn version never released as the other versions were delayed into 1998.	Gremlin Interactive	Gremlin Interactive
Burn Cycle	Released for the CD-i in 1994, console ports for the Saturn and PlayStation were announced in 1996, but neither ever surfaced.	TripMedia	Philips Interactive Media
Buster Bros. Collection	A collection of ports of the arcade games of the same name, the collection was originally developed and promoted as a release for Saturn and PlayStation, the end product only released on PlayStation. Publications reported that Saturn was originally a platform because the PlayStation version was initially rejected by Sony, who, at the time, was enforcing a policy of not allowing 2D games be published on the PlayStation, and their eventual approval may have lessened the importance of a Saturn release in 1997.	Mitchell Corporation	Capcom
Castlevania: The Bloodletting	Originally announced as a Castlevania entry for the Sega 32X, the platform's short lifespan lead to a shift to the Saturn and PlayStation platforms instead. The game was eventually cancelled, but some content was reworked into Castlevania: Symphony of the Night, which was released on Saturn in 1998 in Japan.	Konami	Konami
Chill	Originally planned for release on Saturn and not on PlayStation in 1998, Eidos eventually reversed plans and decided to do the exact opposite, despite the Saturn version being largely complete. A prototype of the Saturn version leaked on to the internet in 2011.	Silicon Dreams	Eidos Interactive
Converse Hardcore Hoops / Converse City Ball Tour	Announced at E3 1995 for the Saturn, Sega Genesis, Sega 32X, SNES, PlayStation 1, and PC, the game was reportedly far in development, but was cancelled and never released in any capacity. Despite a large budget and a then-impressive 15,000 frames of animations, the game reported garnered very negative reactions from test audiences, who did not like the game's half-court, two versus two set up.		Virgin Interactive
Creation	With work starting in the early 1990s, the game featured a lengthy and troubled development process. Versions for Saturn, PlayStation, Amiga CD32, and various PC platforms were announced over time, though no version of the game was ever released.	Bullfrog Productions	
Crime Patrol	After releasing as an arcade game and a few PC and consoles in 1993 and 1994, ports to Saturn and PlayStation were announced for 1996, but neither released.	American Laser Games	American Laser Games
Croc 2	It was originally advertised in the instruction manual of the original game for a release on the PlayStation and Sega Saturn for a Christmas 1998 release; however, the game's delay into a 1999 release moved it beyond the Saturn's lifespan, and only PlayStation and PC versions were released.	Argonaut Software	Fox Interactive
Cyber Sled	A 1994 arcade game announced for the Saturn in May 1995 for later that year, the game only ended up on the PlayStation in the end. While no reason was given, Namco did not end up releasing any games for the Saturn, instead supporting PlayStation and to a lesser extent the Nintendo 64.	Namco	Namco
CyberSpeed	Announced for a 1996 Saturn release shortly after its late 1995 PlayStation release, the Saturn version never materialized.	Mindscape	Mindscape
Cyberwar	Released on PC platforms, all console ports announced, Saturn included, never released.	Sales Curve Interactive	Interplay Entertainment
D2	Initially starting development for the cancelled Panasonic M2 console, a Saturn version was in development for a period in 1997 until it was scrapped in favor of releasing it for the Dreamcast across 1999 and 2000.	Warp	Sega
Darknet	Announced for Saturn at E3 1996, but never released.		American Softworks
Dark Ride	Announced as a FMV game that played like a "psychedelic roller coaster" strategy game played from the first person perspective, it was initially announced for Sega CD, 32X, and later shifted development to the Sega Saturn, but never ended up releasing on any platform.	Rocket Science Games	Rocket Science Games
Dark Rift	Originally announced for the Saturn, development shifted to Nintendo 64 and Windows, the only platforms it released for in 1997.	Kronos Digital Entertainment	
Dark Sun: Shattered Lands	Released for PC platforms, announced Saturn and PlayStation ports never released.	Strategic Simulations, Inc.	Data East
Deadly Skies	Announced for Saturn, 3DO, and PC, and scheduled for a November 1996 release, the game was delayed, and only released on PlayStation in 1997.	Virtual Studio	JVC Musical Industries
Deathtrap Dungeon	A video game adaption of the game of a same name, a Saturn version was originally planned, though only the PlayStation and PC versions ever released.		Eidos Interactive
Descent	Released across PlayStation and PC platform in 1995 and 1996, plans for a Saturn port were cancelled upon the developers having trouble porting it.	Parallax Software	Interplay
Destruction Derby 2/XL	Announced at E3 1996 and reported relatively far into development, the game was cancelled in 1997 when THQ cancelled all plans for publishing games for the Saturn, citing not wanting the risk of publishing on the platform when hardware and software sales were sluggish. The game still released on PlayStation and Windows.	THQ	Probe Entertainment
Diablo	Shortly after its PC release, a Sega press release in mid-1997 announced a Saturn version for later in the year. However, only a PlayStation version was released, later in 1998.	Blizzard North	Electronic Arts
Down in the Dumps	Originally for the CD-i, ports for the Saturn and PlayStation were announced for late 1996 after its failure, though only releases for PC platforms every materialized.	Haiku Studios	Philips Interactive Media
Dragon's Heaven	A video game adaptation of Dragon's Heaven, an expansion for the Japanese tabletop RPG Hyper Tunnels & Trolls, was announced for a 1995 release on Super Famicom. Development of the game later shifted to the Sega Saturn before ultimately being cancelled.	Digitalware	Data East
Dragon's Lair	Mentioned at E3 1996, the Saturn version never materialized, despite releasing on so many other platforms.	ReadySoft	Sega
Dragon's Lair II: Time Warp	Mentioned at E3 1996, the Saturn version never materialized, alongside many other proposed home console ports originally planned at the time.	ReadySoft	Sega
Dream Knight	Listed as a game in development by Jaleco at E3 1996, nothing else is known, as the game never materialized further.	Jaleco	Jaleco
Dream Team Basketball	Present at E3 1996 listed as a game to be released for Saturn and PlayStation to be released in 1996 as a tie in to the 1996 Olympics, the game never released on either platform.	Eidos Interactive	Eidos Interactive
Dungeon Keeper	Released on PC platforms in 1997, Saturn and PlayStation versions were in development and due for release in 1997, but were both cancelled.	Bullfrog Productions	Electronic Arts
Endorfun	Released for PC, Super Nintendo, and PlayStation, versions for Saturn and Nintendo 64 were announced but never released.	Onesong Partners	Time Warner Interactive
Eternal Champions: The Final Chapter	In development by a team within Sega of America, the game was forcefully cancelled by Sega of Japan, who felt that the Eternal Champions series were cannibalizing the sales of Sega of Japan's Virtua Fighter series.	Sega	Sega
Fade to Black	A Saturn version was announced in 1996, but the game only ended up releasing on PC and PlayStation platforms.	Delphine Software International	
Fantastic Four	Saturn version was cancelled in 1997 as Acclaim Entertainment re-evaluated their support for the Saturn, though the PlayStation version still released later in 1998.	Probe Entertainment	Acclaim Entertainment
Ferox	A playable demo was shopped to publishers, though developer Hookstone went out of business before being able to release it. At some point, a near-final build leaked on to the internet.	Hookstone	
Fighting Force	A Sega Saturn version was developed and eventually completed. After Eidos decided against publishing this version, Sega Europe secured the publishing rights and announced a European release date of November 1997, but it was ultimately cancelled. PlayStation, Windows, and Nintendo 64 versions were released between 1997 and 1999. An early prototype of the Saturn version was leaked in November 2008.	Core Design	Sega
Firo and Klawd	A Saturn version was announced, with release dates in 1996 and 1997, but only PlayStation and Windows version ever released.	Interactive Studios Limited	BMG Interactive
Flying Aces	Originally announced for Sega CD 32X platform, its short-lived lifespan lead to development shifting to Saturn, though it never released there or anywhere else either.	Rocket Science Games	Rocket Science Games
Foes of Ali	Released for the 3D0, Saturn and PlayStation versions were announced, but never released. The Saturn version was complete enough to have review copies sent to magazine publications.	Gray Matter	Electronic Arts
Formula 1	Was initially announced for Sega, but only ended up releasing on PlayStation.	Probe Software	Psygnosis
Forsaken	Saturn version was announced but cancelled in 1997 when Acclaim re-evaluated its Saturn support. The game released on Nintendo 64, PlayStation, and Windows instead.	Probe Entertainment	Acclaim Entertainment
Fractal Racer	Starting development on the 32X, development eventually shifted to Saturn, though the game never released in any capacity.	Core Design	
Free Runner	Shown off by Sega themselves at E3 1995 for release later in the year,	Sega	Sega
G-Police	Originally announced in January 1997 as one of seven Psygnosis titles to be published by THQ for release later in 1997, like many of the titles, never ended up releasing after THQ dropped support for the Saturn later in the year.	Psygnosis	THQ
Ganymede	Scheduled for release in 1997, the game never materialized after developer Rocket Science Games closed down that same year.	Rocket Science Games	BMG Entertainment
Gender Wars	Scheduled for release for the Saturn in 1996, the game only ended up releasing for MS-DOS.	The 8th Day	Sales Curve Interactive
Genewars	Scheduled for release for the Saturn in 1996, the game only ended up releasing for MS-DOS.	Bullfrog Productions	
Goal Storm (World Soccer: Winning Eleven)	Originally announced for release on PlayStation in 1995 and Saturn in 1996, only the PlayStation release ever happened.	Konami	Konami
Grand Theft Auto	The game was originally in development for Saturn, Nintendo 64, PlayStation, and PC platforms, but only released on the latter 2.	DMA Design	BMG Interactive Entertainment
Guilty Gear	A Saturn version was announce for release in Japan in 1997, but only the PlayStation version released.	Arc System Works	Arc System Works
Heart of Darkness	The game featured a protracted 6 year development cycle, and over the course of that time, was announced and cancelled for many platforms that became unviable. It was due to be a Sega Saturn exclusive for period, but after losing its publisher in 1996, the game was delayed, and by the time it released in mid-1998, it only released on PlayStation and Windows.	Amazing Studio	Sega
Hexen II	Ports for the Saturn and PlayStation were announced by Activision, but only the Windows version released.	Raven Software	Activision
HyperBlade / Hockeydrome	Originally announced as Hockeydrome, a futuristic, ultraviolent version of the sport of hockey for the 32X, Sega Saturn, and the original PlayStation, by the time the game was released under its final name, HyperBlade, in November 1996, only a version for Windows was released.	Wizbang! Software Productions	Activision
The Indestructibles	Announced for Saturn and the original PlayStation, the game was not released in any capacity, being cancelled after a lengthy and troubled development period.	Bullfrog Productions	Bullfrog Productions
IndyCar Racing II	The game was reportedly 30% complete in late 1995 and scheduled for a 1996 release on Saturn, but only ended up releasing on PC platforms.	Papyrus Software	Papyrus Software
Inferno	Was reportedly in development for Saturn in 1995, but only ended up releasing for MS-DOS.	Digital Image Design	Ocean Software
Into the Shadows	Announced for Saturn, PlayStation, and PC, though the game never released on any platforms. Developer Scavenger went out of business in 1997.	Scavenger	Triton
Iron & Blood: Warriors of Ravenloft	The Sega Saturn version was announced, but eventually cancelled as part of Acclaim's withdrawal of support for the Saturn, only releasing on PlayStation and PC in the end.		Acclaim Entertainment
Jet Ski Rage	Announced for Saturn but never released on it, or on any other platform.	Velocity	
The Journeyman Project: Director's Cut	A director's cut of the original PC game was announced for Saturn and PlayStation, but never released for either.	Presto Studios	Sanctuary Woods
The Journeyman Project: Pegasus Prime	Versions of the PC original for the Saturn and PlayStation were announced, but cancelled after Presto Studios underwent large layoffs.	Presto Studios	Sanctuary Woods
Judge Dredd	Released in 1995 for the Sega Genesis, Super NES, and PC platforms, expanded versions for the 32X, Saturn, and PlayStation were announced, but went unreleased.	Probe Software	Acclaim Entertainment
Killing Time	Originally released on the 3DO, Acclaim acquired the rights to publish the game on the Saturn and PlayStation afterwards, and announced a 1997 release date, but released the game for either platform.	Studio 3DO	Acclaim Entertainment
Kingdom O' Magic	Originally announced for Saturn, PlayStation, DOS, and Macintosh, the game only ended up releasing on DOS.	Sales Curve Interactive	Sales Curve Interactive
Kumite	Named for the fighting style it would portray, the game was announced for a Saturn release in 1996, but never materialized.	47 Tek	Konami
Lethal Enforcers	An arcade game released on Sega Genesis, Sega CD, SNES, PlayStation, but the announced Saturn version never released.	Konami	Konami
Lethal Enforcers 2	An arcade game released on Sega Genesis, Sega CD, and PlayStation, but the announced Saturn and SNES versions never released.	Konami	Konami
Magic: The Gathering	Released on Windows in 1997, Saturn and PlayStation versions were announced, but never released.	Wizards of the Coast	Acclaim Entertainment
Magic: The Gathering: Battlemage	Released in early 1997 on PC and PlayStation, a Saturn version was announced for later in the year, but never released.	Wizards of the Coast	Acclaim Entertainment
Major Damage	Announced for Saturn and PlayStation, the game experienced a troubled development history that delayed it beyond the Saturn's lifespan, and both Capcom and Sony declined to publish it on PlayStation, leaving it completely unreleased (though the game did leak onto the internet years later).	Capcom	Capcom
Maximum Surge	A FMV game announced for Saturn, 3DO, and PC platforms, the game never released, though some video footage was recycled into the 2003 film Game Over.	Digital Pictures	Digital Pictures
MediEvil	Early work on the game was done on the Saturn and Windows, but these versions were cancelled after the development team was bought and turned into a Sony first party development team SCE Studio Cambridge. The game released as a PlayStation exclusive in 1998.	SCE Studio Cambridge	
Micro Machines V3	Initially scheduled for concurrent development and release on Saturn and PlayStation in 1996, when delayed into 1997, development on the Saturn version was halted, and only the PlayStation version was released.	Codemasters	Midway Games
Mission Impossible	When Ocean Software first announced they had acquired the rights to create a video game adaption of the 1996 Mission Impossible film in 1996, announced platforms included the 32X, Sega Genesis, Sega Saturn, and the SNES. However, a lengthy development period delayed it well beyond most of the platform's lifespans, leading to it only releasing on the Nintendo 64 and PlayStation 1 by the time of its 1998 release.	Ocean Software	Infogrames
Mortal Kombat 3	An arcade game with many home console ports, however, Sony paid for timed exclusivity on 32-bit consoles, and by the time it expired, Midway focused on porting the updated Ultimate Mortal Kombat instead.	Midway Games	GT Interactive
Mudkicker	A game present at E3 1996 for the Saturn and PlayStation, but released for neither.	Scavenger	GT Interactive
Mystery of the Seven Mansions	Present at E3 1996 as a game for Saturn and PlayStation, it never released.	Koei	Koei
Myth: History in the Making	A revival of Myth: History in the Making (1989) was in development for Nintendo 64, PlayStation, Sega Saturn, and Windows. The release was delayed due to a legal dispute with Eidos Interactive, who were already releasing their own Myth series, and the game ultimately never materialized for any system.	System 3	
NBA Hang Time	An arcade game ported to a number of home consoles across 1996 and 1997, even older platforms such as Sega Genesis and SNES, but the Saturn and PC versions never released.	Midway Games	Midway
NFL Full Contact	Announced for Saturn and PlayStation, the Saturn version was cancelled after developers had a hard time working on the platform.	Robin Antonick Games	Konami
NHL Breakaway 98	A Sega Saturn version was in development, but was dropped from Acclaim's release schedule when the publisher withdrew their support from the Saturn in order to focus on PlayStation and Nintendo 64, where the game eventually released.		Acclaim Entertainment
NHL Powerplay 97	Game was cancelled when publisher Virgin Interactive dropped support for the Saturn.	Radical Entertainment	Virgin Interactive
Ninja: Shadow of Darkness	Originally Saturn was the main development platform for the game, and a near-final beta version of the game existed. However, its delay into 1998, coupled with Eidos transitioning away from Saturn support in 1997, left the game only released on PlayStation and Windows platforms. There are also pick-ups used to recover health.	Core Design	Eidos Interactive
Nuclear Strike	Released on PlayStation and Nintendo 64, but the announced Saturn version never released.	Electronic Arts	Electronic Arts
Oddworld: Abe's Oddysee	Announced for Saturn, PC, and PlayStation platforms, the Saturn release never materialized.	Oddworld Inhabitants	Sega
Offensive	Released for PC, but Saturn version was announced but never released.		Ocean Software
Olympic Summer Games/Olympic Games	Released for 16-bit platforms, but the Saturn version was never released despite being reportedly far into development.	Eidos Interactive	U.S. Gold
Perfect Weapon	Released across 1996 and 1997 on PlayStation and Windows, the Saturn version was scheduled for May 1997, but never released.	ASC Games	American Softworks
Pinky and the Brain	Announced in 1996 as a tie-in game to the cartoon of the same name, it never released in its 1997 release window.	Konami	Konami
Pitfall 3D	A Saturn version was announced for release in 1997, but only the PlayStation version released after its release date was moved to 1998.	Activision	Activision
Planet of the Apes	A Planet of the Apes game was listed as a game in development as early as 1997. However, no Planet of the Apes game was released until 2001, well after the Saturn's lifespan. A version was announced for the Saturn's successor, the Dreamcast, was also announced, but never released, as the game only released on PlayStation and Windows.	Visiware Studios	Fox Interactive
Prime Time NFL Football Starring Deion Sanders	Sega advertised publishing the game for the Saturn, 32X, and Sega Genesis in 1996, though only the Genesis version ever released. Sega published NFL '97 on the Saturn instead.	FarSight Technologies	Sega
Prize Fighter	Released on the Sega CD in 1993, a Saturn version was announced, but never released.	Digital Pictures	Sega
Project Overkill	Plans for a Saturn version were announced, but only the PlayStation version ended up releasing in 1996.	Konami	Konami
Psychic Force	An arcade game with versions announced for the Saturn and PlayStation, though only the PlayStation version ever released.	Taito	Game Bank
Rattlesnake Red	Announced for both Saturn and PlayStation, but cancelled for both. Developers recollected that the game had quality issues.	Sculptured Software	Acclaim Entertainment
Raw Pursuit	Present at E3 1996, as an upcoming game for Saturn and PlayStation, though it never released for either.	JVC Musical Industries	
Rayman 2: The Great Escape	Rayman 2 began development as a 2D platformer similar to the original Rayman, due out late 1996, just a year after its predecessor. When it was decided to rework it as a full 3D game, its release date was pushed back to 1999, well beyond the lifespan of the Saturn. It was released on various other platforms, including the Saturn successor the Dreamcast.	Ubisoft	Ubisoft
Re-Loaded	Announced for Saturn, PlayStation, and DOS, but only the Saturn version never released.	Gremlin Interactive	Interplay Entertainment
Rebel Strike	A Star Wars themed game announced by Sega, but never detailed or released.	Sega	Sega
Resident Evil 2	The first attempt to develop the game, often referred to as Resident Evil 1.5, struggled, and the entire development was restarted, moving it from a 1997 to 1998 release date. The Saturn poor state at the time, coupled with issues getting the game running on Saturn, lead to its cancellation. Instead released on PlayStation, Nintendo 64, and the Saturn's successor, the Dreamcast.	Nextech	Capcom
Return Fire	Originally released for the 3DO in 1995, a Saturn version was announced, and finished enough for review copies to be sent to magazines, though the game did not release. An Atari Jaguar CD version was also cancelled, though a PlayStation port did release.	Prolific	Williams Entertainment
Ripper	Released on PC platforms. Ports to Saturn and PlayStation were announced, but neither materialized.	Take-Two Interactive	Take-Two Interactive
Robinson's Requiem	Released for a variety of PC and Atari platforms in the 1990s, a Saturn version was once reported on by Sega Visions magazine, but never released.	ReadySoft	ReadySoft
Rocket Boy	An isometric action platformer game with pre-rendered 3D graphics in the vein of SegaSonic the Hedgehog (1993) and Sonic 3D Blast (1996), following a boy and his dog navigating a hostile alien planet. Originally in development for the Sega CD, the developer's lack of commercial success in releasing games for the platform lead for development to be moved to the Sega 32X and later the Saturn before its ultimate cancellation. Prior to its cancellation, it had been scheduled for a late 1995 release on the Saturn, but the game had been put on hold due to its developers feeling it was too similar to other games they observed at CES 1995. They later closed down entirely in 1997.	Rocket Science Games	Rocket Science Games
Rollcage	A Saturn version was announced, but only the PlayStation and Windows versions released.	Team17	Psygnosis
S.T.O.R.M.	Saturn and PlayStation versions were mentioned in print ads and at E3 1996, but the game only released on PC.	Virtual Studio	American Softworks
The Sacred Pools	A FMV game by Sega's short-lived SegaSoft branch, the game was present at E3 1996, and on release schedules until 1997, but never released in any capacity.	SegaSoft	Sega
Sampras Extreme Tennis	A Saturn version was announced, but never released. Released on PlayStation and on PC as Pete Sampras Tennis '97	Codemasters	Codemasters
Sentient	Cancelled in 1997 when THQ cancelled all plans for publishing games for the Saturn, citing not wanting the risk of publishing on the platform when hardware and software sales were sluggish. PlayStation and Windows versions were still released.	Psygnosis	THQ
Sentinel Returns	Saturn version was announced, but only the PlayStation and PC versions released.	Hookstone	
Shadoan	Present at E3 1996, and listed as an upcoming Saturn release through mid-1997, the game never ended up releasing on Saturn, only PC platforms saw release.	Digital Leisure	ReadySoft
Shenmue	Shenmue began development on Saturn as a Virtua Fighter RPG game starring Akira Yuki. The game was later rebranded into a new IP, Shenmue, and the game progressed a ways into development, with footage of the Saturn version depicting certain scenes that would later be present in the final game release. Development time was lengthy and was later shifted to, and released for, the Dreamcast across 1999 and 2000 instead.	Sega AM2	Sega
Shredfest	A spin-off of the Road Rash series that involved racing and fighting while snowboarding rather than Road Rash's motorcycling. Originally in development for the Sega Genesis under the name Face Plant across 1993 and 1994, it was cancelled in 1995 in favor of shifting development to the newer Sega Saturn, PlayStation 1, and the 3DO platforms. While development continued into 1996 under the new name Shredfest, it was eventually cancelled for those platforms as well.	Electronic Arts	Electronic Arts
Skies of Arcadia	Early work in the game began on the Saturn before transitioning and releasing on the Dreamcast in 2000 and the GameCube in 2002.	Overworks	Sega
Sonic Adventure	Initial early tests on transitioning Sonic the Hedgehog to 3D gameplay were conducted by Sonic Team on the Saturn. Development moved on to the Dreamcast in 1997 and was eventually released in 1998, while some of the early tests were eventually used for the Sonic World mini-game of Sonic Jam.	Sonic Team	Sega
Sonic the Fighters	Released as an arcade game in 1996, a Saturn port was announced and listed for release through 1997 as a Saturn release. Difficulties accurately recreating the game on Saturn was later cited as the reason it was cancelled, and a home console version would not be released until almost a decade later as part of Sonic Gems Collection for GameCube in 2005.	Sega	Sega
Sonic X-treme	Originally planned as the first truly 3D Sonic game and what would have been the only mainline Sonic game for the Saturn, the game suffered through development hell and was cancelled shortly after missing its holiday 1996 release date. Often cited as a key reason for the Saturn's early death and overall failure.	Sega Technical Institute	Sega
Space Ace	Released on a number of platforms in the generation prior to the Saturn, including the Sega CD, but the announced Saturn version never released.	ReadySoft	Sega
Spanish Blood	Present at E3 1996 as a game in development by Scavenger, Inc., the game never released, with Scavenger going bankrupt shortly after.	Scavenger, Inc.	Scavenger, Inc.
Spider: The Video Game	A Saturn version was planned, but only released for PlayStation.	Boss Game Studios	BMG Entertainment
Star Control 3	Saturn and PlayStation versions were announced, but only PC versions ever released.	Legend Entertainment	Accolade
Steel Harbinger	Saturn and PlayStation versions were announced, but only the PlayStation version ever released.	Mindscape	Mindscape
Supreme Warrior	A FMV game released for the Sega CD, 3DO, and PC platforms, the announced Saturn version never released.	Digital Pictures	Digital Pictures
Syndicate Wars	The game was released on MS-DOS and PlayStation, but the Saturn version was cancelled in 1997, with Bullfrog's head of conversions, Steve Metcalf, explaining that the Saturn userbase was not large enough to recoup porting costs.	Bullfrog Productions	Electronic Arts
Tarantula	Present at E3 1996 as a game in development by Scavenger, Inc., the game never released, with Scavenger going bankrupt shortly after.	Scavenger, Inc.	Scavenger, Inc.
Tecmo Super Bowl	Print ads ran for a Saturn version, but the game only released for PlayStation.	Tecmo	Tecmo
Tenka	Cancelled in 1997 when THQ cancelled all plans for publishing games for the Saturn, citing not wanting the risk of publishing on the platform when hardware and software sales were sluggish. PlayStation and Windows versions were still released.	Psygnosis	Psygnosis
Terminus	Present at E3 1996 as a game in development by Scavenger, Inc., the game never released, with Scavenger going bankrupt shortly after. Unrelated to Terminus (2000 video game).	Scavenger, Inc.	Scavenger, Inc.
Test Drive Off-Road	Print ads advertised a Saturn version as well, but only PlayStation and PC versions ever released.	Elite Systems	Accolade
Theme Hospital	A Saturn version was in development, but only the PlayStation and PC versions ever released. Went under the working title of Sim Hospital for a period.	Bullfrog Productions	Electronic Arts
Tomb Raider II	Originally in development for Saturn and PlayStation, the Saturn version was dropped due to Sony paying for exclusivity, and the relatively poorer sales of the original Tomb Raider game on Saturn in comparison to the PlayStation version.	Core Design	Eidos Interactive
Transformers	In 1994, Takara announced that the cancellation of a Transformers game being developed for SNES, and that the project would instead be released in 1995 on the next generation of consoles, including the then-unnamed next Sega console. However, these ports were also never released.	Argonaut Software	Takara
Turok: Dinosaur Hunter	Saturn version was announced but cancelled in 1997 when Acclaim re-evaluated its Saturn support. The game released on Nintendo 64 and Windows instead.	Iguana Entertainment	Acclaim Entertainment
Vandals	Announced for Saturn and PlayStation in 1996, little was shown outside of concept art, and the game never released in any capacity on any platform.	Accolade	Accolade
Varuna's Forces	The game was in a lengthy development period for a number of platforms that had shorter lifespans - Saturn, Dreamcast, 3DO, Atari Jaguar, but development generally ran after their respective platform's lifespans, and was eventually cancelled even from its PC release.	Accent Media	JVCKenwood Victor Entertainment
Vectorman 3	Directly after releasing Vectorman (1995) and Vectorman 2 (1996) late in the Sega Genesis's lifespan, developer BlueSky Software started work on a third entry for the Saturn. No official reason was given for the game's cancellation, but Sega generally stopped collaborating with BlueSky after the Genesis generation.	BlueSky Software	Sega
Viewpoint	An arcade game released on a number of home consoles. It released on the Sega Genesis and PlayStation, but the Saturn version went unreleased.	Sammy	SNK
Virtua Fighter 3	Was announced at E3 1996 and its development and release plans were discussed by Sega throughout 1997, but it was never released, with development moving to Dreamcast as a launch title across 1998 and 1999.as the enhanced Virtua Fighter 3 Team Battle.	Sega AM2	Sega
Virtua Hamster	Announced in 1995 as a game in development for the 32X, development was briefly shifted to the Saturn before being cancelled outright.	Sega	Sega
Virtual Pool	An iteration of the long running games series was announced for Saturn, but only ended up releasing on PlayStation and PC.	Celeris	Interplay Entertainment
VMX Racing	A Saturn version was included in print advertisements for the game, but only the PlayStation version ever released.	Studio E	Playmates Interactive Entertainment
VR Baseball '97	Saturn and PC versions was included in print advertisements for the game, but only the PlayStation version ever released.	Interplay Entertainment	Interplay Entertainment
War Gods	An arcade game with ports announced for the Saturn, PlayStation, and Nintendo 64. The Saturn version never released.	Midway Games	GT Interactive
Waterworld	A variety of video game adaptions of the 1995 film of the same name were announced for release around the time of the film. While versions released on SNES, Game Boy, Sega Genesis, and even Virtual Boy, the Sega Saturn and 32X versions were never released.	Data Design Interactive	Ocean Software
Werewolf: The Apocalypse	A home console adaption by Capcom was announced for Saturn and PlayStation but both versions were cancelled in early 1997.	Hidden Palace	Capcom
Wet Corpse	Announced for the Sega Saturn and Nintendo 64 and present at E3 1996, very little was known about the title other than it was a survival horror game in the vein of Resident Evil. It was quietly cancelled in 1997 and never materialized in any capacity.	Vic Tokai	Vic Tokai
Wild 9	The Saturn version was cancelled early into the game's lengthy 3 year development cycle, due to Dave Perry's disillusionment with Sega's handling of the Saturn in 1997. It was reported that Sony also paid Interplay for PlayStation exclusivity as well.	Shiny Entertainment	Interplay Entertainment
Wing Commander III: Heart of the Tiger	Released for PC, 3DO, and PlayStation, Saturn and Atari Jaguar CD versions were announced but never released.	Origin Systems	Electronic Arts
X2 (Project X2)	Announced and promoted as a Saturn and PlayStation release, but only released across 1996 and 1997 on PlayStation. Acclaim Entertainment was scheduled to publish in North America, but the company was scaling back Saturn support around this time.	Team17	Ocean Software
Zork Nemesis	Originally announced for Saturn, PlayStation, and PC platforms, the Saturn version never released.	Zombie Studios	Activision
