= The Journeyman Project (video game) =

1993 video game

- Developer: Presto Studios
- Publishers: Presto Studios; Sanctuary Woods; Bandai
- Producer: Michel Kripalani
- Designers: Jeal Choi; Seiji Matsumoto; Phil Saunders
- Programmer: Greg Uhler
- Artists: Jack H. Davis; Jose Albanil; Shadi Almassizadeh
- Writer: David Flanagan
- Series: The Journeyman Project
- Engine: Macromedia Director 2.0
- Platforms: Mac OS, Windows
- Release: January 6, 1993; 1994 (Turbo)
- Genre: Adventure
- Mode: Single-player

The Journeyman Project is a 1993 adventure game developed and published by Presto Studios.

== Gameplay ==
The game features a first-person perspective. The protagonist sees a display, a rectangle-shaped visor (acting as a monocle for Agent 5). This user interface helps to reduce the movie size and maintain relatively high frame rates. Controls work as four interface buttons located below the screen. They move Agent 5 forward and backward, and rotate Agent 5 left and right.

The Journeyman Project was billed as an interactive movie adventure game, where the player is presented with several clues and puzzles that must be solved in order to move on or finish the level. Items that the player finds can be helpful or harmful as he attempts to explore his surroundings. The most important of these items are the seven bio-chips, which enhance the player-character's abilities in various ways. The game's user interface stores the bio-chips in a special "bio-chip panel", which serves as a "quick-menu" for activating and deactivating the various chips.

== Story ==
What an Agent sees when he activates the time machine

The game takes place in the distant future, after the Earth has been united into a peaceful global community. A scientist has discovered the technology of time travel but because of its dangerous nature, the prototype machine, "Pegasus", has been placed under government control and further attempts at traveling through time or developing time travel technology are forbidden by law.

The game begins as humanity welcomes the first alien delegation to visit the planet, and prepares to answer positively to an invitation to join the interplanetary "Symbiotry of Peaceful Beings". During the induction ceremony, the government-operated Temporal Security Agency (TSA), which was established to enforce prohibitions on time travel and safeguard the timeline, detects three temporal disturbances that have altered history; the Agency mobilizes Agent 5 to correct the disruptions, which have altered the timeline so that the Symbiotry never extended its invitation.

The Morimoto Mars Colony

Upon retrieving a cache of unaltered historical data from the distant past, Agent 5 discovers that the anachronisms are related to Earth's first contact with the Symbiotry; ten years prior, the aliens had extended their offer, and planned to return in one decade to receive Earth's answer. An unknown party has altered the timeline to prevent contact with the Symbiotry, either through preventing them from reaching Earth or changing humanity's reaction to the aliens' arrival.

The disruptions occurred during three key events in Earth's recent past:

- The conference of 2112 which led to peace and prosperity through the unification of Earth over opposing voices. The robot "Poseidon" is sent to launch a nuclear missile and detonate it above Ghorbistan so that fear prevents the countries from proceeding with the acceptance of the treaty.
- The first acknowledged contact with an alien ship in 2185 above Mars. The robot "Ares" is sent to accomplish two tasks: to destroy the Morimoto Mars Colony so that humanity connects the aliens with the colony's destruction and grow skeptical of their intentions, and to destroy the aliens' ship to demonstrate that humanity is willing to use violence against them.
- A symposium for deliberating the aliens' offer in 2310, where the speech of Dr. Enrique Castillo persuaded the opposing scientists to accept joining the Symbiotry. The robot "Mercury" is sent to assassinate Castillo so that the opposition prevailed.

After preventing the robots' missions and collecting evidence from each time period, Agent 5 discovers that the person responsible for the disruptions is Dr. Elliot Sinclair, the inventor of the Pegasus time machine. He fears that the aliens are a malevolent force rather than a peaceful race, and is doing everything in his power to make Earth an unsuitable candidate for joining the aliens.

In all three scenarios, the player has two ways to neutralize the robots—one "peaceful" and one "aggressive"—which will affect the player's overall score. The player also gains bio-chips from each robot when he completes each scenario successfully.

Elliot Sinclair, giving instructions and confessing his intentions to his last Prototype, Poseidon, as seen on an Optical Memory Bio-Chip

After correcting the anachronisms created by Sinclair, Agent 5 learns that the doctor decided to take matters into his own hands and assassinate the alien delegate sent to receive Earth's answer. Agent 5 finds Sinclair hiding on top of an apartment building and holding a rifle, ready to fire on the delegate as soon as he arrives. After a brief scuffle, Agent 5 arrests Sinclair, allowing history to take its proper course.

== Development ==
The Journeyman Project was completed in 1992 and released in early 1993 after 2 years of development. The game impressed the gaming press with its use of high quality rendered environments, stylistic artwork and digital audio.

Due to performance difficulties, the game was re-released in 1994 as Journeyman Project Turbo!, with an updated executable that drastically decreased loading times and improved animation quality.

Two sequels (Buried in Time and Legacy of Time) were released in subsequent years, and a fourth game was in the design stage before Presto Studios closed in November 2002; it was eventually shelved in favor of work on Myst III: Exile.

A redesign of the game, with the subtitle of Pegasus Prime, was released for the Power Macintosh; it featured updated graphics, enhanced and updated sounds and puzzles, and improved video technology. Plans to release it on multiple platforms were cancelled. In April 2014 the game was released on Windows through GOG.com.

== Reception ==
Reception

Review scores
Publication	Score
Dragon	4/5
Hyper	65/100
MacUser	4/5

The Journeyman Project sold 150,000 copies, and spawned the Journeyman Project series, which together sold roughly 500,000 units by July 1996. The game was self-published and retailed for $90, with a per-sale profit of $40–50 for Presto Studios. It had been developed on $70,000.

Computer Gaming World in July 1993 called The Journeyman Project "visually stunning" and its world "believably fantastic". The magazine stated that the game was "as tough as they come" and recommended built-in hints, but concluded that "It is all the more rewarding after puzzling past each conundrum". In April 1994 the magazine said that the game had "wonderfully rendered 3D worlds" with "Solid acting by real pros", concluding that it was "Definitely a game with which to wow the neighbors".

Derek Pearcy reviewed The Journeyman Project in Pyramid #2 (July/Aug., 1993), and stated that "This game - this environment - is the finest experience available on the Macintosh platform. While maybe not the intellectual challenge that other programs might offer, it is the clarity of vision and attention to detail that should take this game out of the store and into your home". Stating that "it isn't a game — it's an experience", InfoWorld in December 1993 praised the Macintosh version's graphics, sound, and puzzles, but advised players to use a hard drive because of slow CD-ROM access.MacUser named The Journeyman Project: Turbo one of the top 50 CD-ROMs of 1995.

== Releases and bug fixes ==
The game suffered from performance problems and slow animations due to its early reliance on Macromedia Director. These problems were mostly overcome with the version 2.0 release and retitled as The Journeyman Project Turbo! under the publisher Sanctuary Woods in 1994.

- The Journeyman Project v1.0 (1993) – original self-published release for Macintosh
- The Journeyman Project v1.1 (1993) – bug fixes
- The Journeyman Project v1.2 (1993) – performance upgrade, fastest Mac version until TJP Turbo
- The Journeyman Project MPC v1.0 (1993) – first release for Windows 3.1
- The Journeyman Project Turbo (1994) – unified release for Mac and PC with major speed improvements
- The Journeyman Project: Pegasus Prime (1997) – a complete remake of the original
