= Matt Weinhold =

American comedian (born 1960)

- Born: May 7, 1964 (age 60); San Francisco, California, U.S.

Matthew Weinhold (born May 7, 1964, in San Francisco, California), professionally known as Matt Weinhold, is an American comedian, writer, producer, actor, and podcast host who has forged a successful entertainment career since the 1990s, with a particular emphasis on comedy, science fiction, horror, and pop culture.

== Career ==
Weinhold first started as a stand-up comedian, headlining at numerous comedy clubs, college campuses, private functions, and even sci-fi conventions. Weinhold was the winner of the Seattle International Comedy Competition in 1989. In 1990, he finished third in the San Francisco Comedy Competition and was the host for the first preliminary round in the 1991 competition.

In the 1990s in San Francisco, he was part of a satirical comedy troupe called Comedy Obscura along with Greg Proops, Mike Bossier and Debi Durst which combined pre-written sketches and improv for audiences during their run.

This work led to several comedy spot appearances on various TV networks, including NBC's Late Friday and Comedy Showcase, A&E's An Evening at the Improv and Caroline's Comedy Hour and Comedy on the Road, Showtime's Full Frontal Comedy, Fox's Comic Strip Live, and Comedy Central's Two Drink Minimum. He also performed at the MGM Grand Hotel in the Catch a Falling Star show alongside Chris Bliss and Joni Grassey.

Weinhold has an extensive collection of comic books, movie posters, cartoon figurines, and science fiction memorabilia at home, indicating his passion for pop culture and geeky interests influenced his comedic material.

=== Acting and writing ===
Weinhold also pursued acting and guest-starred in TV shows such as The Weird Al Show, The Comeback, and Studio 60 on the Sunset Strip. He also ventured into voice-over work, lending his talents to shows like Throut and Neck, Super Adventure Team, Squirrel Boy and Code Monkeys. He became a writer/performer on TV series such as Style Channel's The Dish.

Weinhold has served as a staff and credited writer for a number of shows, most notably Beware the Batman and Stan Against Evil. He served as executive producer/head writer for several shows on Playboy TV, including Foursome: Walk of Shame, The Stash, and Groundbreakers, hosted by John Waters. Additionally, he has provided material for the Emmy Awards and BBC America's The Nerdist. Later, he delved into producing and TV showrunning.

=== Podcasting ===
Weinhold is a co-host of the Monster Party podcast. It was nominated for Rondo Hatton Classic Horror Awards in the category of Best Podcast for 2022, finishing with an Honorable Mention at award time.

=== Authorship ===
Weinhold was a writer for Us Weekly's Fashion Police column and contributed the Horror chapter to the book The Comedy Film Nerds Guide to Movies, a collection produced out of the now-defunct Comedy Film Nerds podcast.

Weinhold's writing has also appeared in comic format. In Creepy's run at Dark Horse, Creepy #10 produced an anthology tribute to H. P. Lovecraft. Weinhold's "Mint in Package" was a story of a collector discovering rare Dark Godz toys and suffering the consequences of opening the mint condition boxes.

== Filmography and gameography ==
=== Writing ===
Year	Title	Medium	Notes	Ref
1995	The Journeyman Project 2: Buried in Time	Video Game	Additional Writing	
1998	The Journeyman Project 3: Legacy of Time	Video Game	Additional Writing	
2002	Whacked!	Video Game	Lead Writer	
2009	Comedy Film Nerds	Podcast Series	Writer	
2010	Carbon Nation	Documentary	Writer	
2009-2011	The Dish	TV Series	Writer	
2011	The Nerdist: End of the Year Special	TV Special	Writer	
2013-2014	Beware the Batman	TV Series	Writer	
2018	Stan Against Evil	TV Series	Writer	
2019-2020	Mission Unstoppable with Miranda Cosgrove	TV Series	Writer	

=== Acting ===
Year	Title	Role	Notes	Ref
1995	The Journeyman Project 2: Buried in Time	Arthur (voice)	Video Game	
1998	The Journeyman Project: Pegasus Prime	Arthur (voice)	Video Game	
1997	The Weird Al Show	Game Show Host	1 episode, S1E8 "Talent Show"	
1998	The Journeyman Project 3: Legacy of Time	Arthur (voice)	Video Game	
2002	Whacked!	Van Tastic (voice)	Video Game	
2005	The Suite Life of Zack & Cody	Doctor Sal	S1E13 "Poor Little Rich Girl"	
2005	The Comeback	Warm Up Comic	2 episodes	
2006	Squirrel Boy	Scoutmaster Dan (voice)	S1E2 "Scout's Dishonor/Andy Had a Little Squirrel"	
2007	Powerloafing	Romulan Commander		
2007	Studio 60 on the Sunset Strip	Hannibal	2 episodes	
2008	Green Flash	Pete Palmer		
2013	Outlands	Old Man Hologram/Captain Val (Voice)		
2013–Present	Monster Party	Co-Host	Podcast, 250+ Episodes	
2017	Pitch Off with Doug Benson	Himself (Guest)		
2023	Collector's Call	Himself	"Meet Matt Weinhold"	
