= Inland Productions =

American video game developer

Inland Productions, Inc., was a video game developer based out of Carol Stream, Illinois. It developed software for home video game consoles and for Microsoft Windows.

Inland Productions was founded in May 1996 by two former employees of development company Studio E. THQ acquired a 25-percent stake in Inland in July 1996 and became its publisher. In early 1997 Studio E filed a lawsuit against the two founders and THQ, alleging that their former employees had reneged on a deal to finish the game VMX Racing and used equipment that was Studio E property to start up Inland Productions. The studio dissolved in 2005.

== Games developed ==
Year	Title	System	Published
1998	Bass Masters Classic: Tournament Edition	Windows	THQ
1998	WCW Nitro	Nintendo 64; Windows; PlayStation	THQ
1999	Deer Hunt Challenge	Windows	Electronic Arts
1999	WCW/nWo Thunder	PlayStation	THQ
2000	Ultimate Hunt Challenge	Windows	Electronic Arts
2001	Outdoorsman Mania	Windows	Electronic Arts
2002	Monster Jam: Maximum Destruction	GameCube; PS2	Ubisoft

== Games ported ==
Year	Title	System	Developer	Publisher
2001	Arctic Thunder	PS2; Xbox	Midway Games	Midway Games
