= Orion Burger =

1996 video game

- Developer(s): Sanctuary Woods
- Publisher(s): Eidos Interactive
- Producer(s): François Robillard
- Designer(s): Robert Aitken
- Programmer(s): Matthew Powell; Nick Porcino
- Artist(s): Andrew Pratt
- Writer(s): Robert Aitken
- Composer(s): Darren McGraw
- Platform(s): MS-DOS, Macintosh
- Release: 1996
- Genre(s): Adventure
- Mode(s): Single-player

Orion Burger is an adventure game developed by Sanctuary Woods and published by Eidos Interactive for MS-DOS and Macintosh. It follows a young man saving the Earth from an interstellar fast food chain through a time loop.

The game was developed using M4, Sanctuary Woods' title for the MicroProse Adventure Development System. It was the company's second and final title not made for children, after The Riddle of Master Lu.

== Plot ==
Orion Burger is vexed. Environmentalist pressure is threatening the company's pretense that it only uses unintelligent raw materials, forcing it to abduct pet shop assistant Wilbur Wafflemeier and test him for sentience before scouring his planet clean. The company is still brazen enough to rig the tests. Wilbur fails miserably. He is supposed to be returned to the moment he left and remember nothing, but the teleporter fails even worse. Wilbur arrives intact to a time one hour before his abduction, and can now cheat back.

== Gameplay ==
Orion Burger has a mouse-driven interface with the commands "take", "use", and "talk". It features full voice-acting, which its Pelit review complimented, but which MikroBitti insulted. It also uses a variety of ambient background noises, but little music.

Gameplay consists of wandering around Wilbur's hometown of Boonsville, solving puzzles to gather gear and information for the aliens' five tests. Wilbur is abducted at regular intervals, tested, and returned to Boonsville through the failing teleporter for another iteration of the loop. Going back in time resets the town and empties Wilbur's inventory, but after Wilbur passes a test, he'll automatically (and instantly) prepare for it on all subsequent iterations. Some tests are puzzles themselves, others merely cutscenes.

Events happen at specific times, allowing Wilbur to take advantage of his foreknowledge. The player can also opt to skip straight to the abduction or give up on a test. Due to the time-loop gameplay mechanic, the game cannot be lost or rendered unwinnable.

== Reception ==
(PC)

Review scores
Publication	Score
Pelit	92%
MikroBitti	67%

The Finnish gaming magazine Pelit gave the game a full-length review; reviewer Tapio Salminen awarded it a score of 92%. Salminen praised its audiovisual design, its humor, a cheerful, laid-back atmosphere that makes it pleasant to play (the threat of planetary genocide notwithstanding), and in particular its puzzles. He noted that "certain parties" (jotkut tahot) considered the game ruined by the periodic abductions, but that he found the time limits to be plentiful.

The Finnish general computing magazine MikroBitti savaged the game, awarding it 67%. According to the review, Orion Burger did have "all the usual features of an adventure game, well executed" (Kaikki seikkailupelin tavanomaiset piirteet löytyvät hyvin toteutettuina), and its graphics, animation, and smooth interface were particularly pleasant. The review went on to describe the time limit as a fiendish device which caused all three test players to lose interest by the time they passed the first test, and which forces the player to endure unbearable amounts of blather without the chance to meaningfully affect the game.
