= Amok (video game) =

1996 video game

- Developer: Lemon
- Publisher: Scavenger
- Composer: Jesper Kyd
- Platforms: MS-DOS, Windows, Saturn
- Release: PC: NA: October 30, 1996; Saturn: NA: January 17, 1997; EU: March 13, 1997
- Genre: Action
- Modes: Single player, multiplayer

Amok is a 1996 mech-themed action video game for Windows and Sega Saturn. Players guide a robot called "Slambird" through nine different scenarios to complete several objectives. The game was noted for its use of voxel-based graphics for its environments rather than the polygonal models which were standard at the time of its release. Developed by Lemon, Amok began as a technology demo for the Sega 32X, but was reworked for the Saturn after Sega discontinued support for the 32X.

== Story ==
Taking place on the planet Amok, a company war has been raging on for 47 years straight. However, upon the 47th year, a peace treaty was finally put into effect and both warring sides ceased fire. Unbeknownst to them is The Bureau, an underground collection of Arms Dealers who were benefiting from the constant weapon sales. The Bureau starts a plan to keep the war going by striking the heart of a strong military compound and research center on the island of Falster. By employing the mercenary mech-pilot Gert Staun - commandeering their latest light ground-sea mech, the Slam Bird - does the Bureau hope to achieve their ultimate goal.

== Gameplay ==
The gameplay follows a seek and destroy format, where the player must destroy certain structures with a cannon that is attached to the Slambird robot. Enemies such as sharks, robots and structures can only be destroyed with the cannon. However, some enemies can be destroyed by simply walking into or over them, mostly foot soldiers and mines (though if mines are swam into, the Slambird endures damage).

The game's levels include both underwater and land areas. In the underwater mode, propellers guide the Slambird Robot. Underwater and land are no different in control, except that the propeller mode fires torpedoes instead of missiles, although they both have the same firing speed, damage and firing rate. Missiles, heavy missiles and bombs can also be fired by the robot, and at the end a special power gun is found to fight Svinet 17.

The game contains many different enemy types. These enemies are split into two groups - non-corporation enemies and corporation enemies. The non-corporation enemies are enemies that have not been developed to destroy the robot by the corporation, such as the bat, the steeljaw rat and the huge ant that can be found in the later missions. The corporation enemies are grunts and machines that have been developed to kill the Slambird Robot; these include the "Grunt," "Scuba Grunts," and various robots and flying objects. The final enemy, "Svinet 17", is a scorpion-shaped robot that must be defeated to finish the game, and it is the most powerful of all the enemies: it can only be killed using the special weapon provided in the last level.

Amok includes both cooperative and deathmatch two-player modes via split screen.

== Reception ==
Reception

Review scores
Publication	Score
Electronic Gaming Monthly	6.125/10 (SAT)
Game Players	6.4/10 (SAT)
GameSpot	4.7/10 (SAT); 3.9/10 (PC)
Sega Saturn Magazine	90% (SAT)
PC Gamer	65%

The Saturn version of Amok was met mixed reception. The most common criticism was that the gameplay in single-player mode is too routine to engage the player, though those critics who commented on the multiplayer mode said that it is much deeper than the single-player. The most common subjects of praise were the easy controls and the unique look of the voxel-based graphics. However, GamePro disagreed on the latter subject, remarking that "the muddy, chunky graphics and boring sounds never provide an interesting environment." Jeff Gerstmann of GameSpot also gave the game a fairly dismal assessment, saying it lacks the freshness and fun of most mech games, and that fans of the genre should save their money for the soon-to-be-released console versions of MechWarrior 2. Most of Electronic Gaming Monthly's four reviewers likewise said that the impressive graphics and stylistics are outweighed by shallow gameplay. Crispin Boyer elaborated, "You wander through the game's nine levels blowing stuff up, and that's about it. You don't have to worry about strategy - other than knowing when to shoot at the bad guys and when to run like hell." Sushi-X disagreed with his three co-reviewers, deeming Amok "a rock-solid 3-D action title with a nice mix of strategy". Rich Leadbetter gave the game an outright laudatory review in Sega Saturn Magazine, making particular note of how failing certain secondary tasks changes the progression of the mission. He concluded that while the high difficulty and unusual look may initially puts players off, "Give it some time though and you can't help but get drawn into this deep, compelling blasting game."
