= The Journeyman Project 3: Legacy of Time =

1998 video game

- Developer: Presto Studios
- Publisher: Red Orb Entertainment
- Director: Tommy Yune
- Producers: Michel Kripalani; Greg Uhler
- Designer: Phil Saunders
- Programmers: Greg Uhler; Roland Gustafsson
- Artists: Jack H. Davis; Frank Vitale; Shadi Almassizadeh
- Writers: Eric Dallaire; David Flanagan
- Series: The Journeyman Project
- Platforms: Windows, Mac OS, Mac OS X
- Release: February 12, 1998
- Genre: Adventure
- Mode: Single-player

The Journeyman Project 3: Legacy of Time is a 1998 adventure game developed by Presto Studios and published by Red Orb Entertainment. It is a sequel to The Journeyman Project and The Journeyman Project 2: Buried in Time. This installment uses a 360° pre-rendered 3D computer-generated imagery interaction system, similar to QuickTime VR. It features impressive production values common for the series. It was also one of the first games to be released on DVD-ROM. It was re-released in 1999 with the Windows versions of The Journeyman Project—Turbo! and Buried in Time as part of a "Trilogy" box set.

== Story ==
Despite Agent 5's success in the previous games, time travel technology is deemed unsafe and the Temporal Security Agency (TSA) is forced to close down. However, Agent 3, the culprit from Buried in Time causes a temporal rip and Gage Blackwood must travel back in time to find her, and discovers that aliens had destroyed three ancient Earth civilizations. After finding Agent 3, he learns that a mysterious alien fleet has appeared in Symbiotry space and is heading towards Earth, looking for an ancient alien relic known as the Legacy of Time. Joining once again with his AI buddy Arthur, he must track down the pieces of the Legacy in the mythical cities of Atlantis, Shangri La, and El Dorado.

== Development ==
The Journeyman Project 3 was developed by a team of 25 people.

The live action characters were all cast from the Screen Actors Guild. Nearly a month was spent on rehearsing and filming the live action footage and voice acting.

== Release ==
Unlike the other games of the Journeyman Project franchise (which were previously published by Sanctuary Woods), Legacy of Time was published by Red Orb Entertainment in 1998.

The game was released on February 12, 1998 at an estimated price of $49.

=== Demo ===
In October 1997, the Legacy of Time demo for Mac and Windows was released with Riven, also published by Red Orb Entertainment. It featured the Potter and Olive Oil Vendor's shop in Atlantis, with the objective to create a Golden Medallion which will help the player enter an Atlantean temple in the full game. Once the objective is reached the demo ends. The trailer is also included and states the game would be released in December 1997, but the game was not released until February 1998.

=== Versions ===
In February 1998, Legacy of Time shipped on four CD-ROMs for both Mac and Windows, but later was released on one DVD-ROM which had separate Mac and Windows versions. The Macintosh DVD version was released in May 1998, being one of the first DVD-ROM games for the Mac platform (in fact, it was bundled with Macintosh PowerBooks that had a DVD drive, the disc could be seen during the introduction of the PowerBook G3 Wallstreet). The Mac version used the same graphics as the CD-ROM version due to the enhanced graphics intended for the DVD version being not ready in time. Later that year on September 2, the Windows DVD version was released and included the enhanced graphics and movies, as well as MPEG-2 trailers of both Legacy of Time and Riven. Solutions exist to run this version on Mac OS. The Journeyman Project Trilogy Package included the original CD-ROM version. While only the Windows versions of the other two games are included, Legacy of Time included the Mac version.

A Mac OS X version was announced on The Journeyman Project Blog. The project began in secret in February 2008 and was headed by Michel Kripalani, Tommy Yune, and Roland Gustafsson of Presto Studios who were involved in the original development of the game. It was originally planned for release in January 2009, but delayed due to a bug in QuickTime 7.6 which caused cosmetic issues. The bug was fixed in QuickTime 7.6.2. The Mac OS X version was released in November. The application is PowerPC only and thus works up to OS X 10.6.

A digital version was released at GOG.com on March 20, 2012.

== Reception ==
Reception

Review scores
Publication	Score
Computer Gaming World	3.5/5
Next Generation	4/5
PC Gamer (UK)	82%
PC Gamer (US)	75%
PC Zone	80/100
PC Magazine	5/5
Computer Games Strategy Plus	5/5
PC Games	C+

Next Generation commented, "Photo-realistic point-and-click adventure games are like Kryptonite to most gamers, but Broderbund's Jouneyman Project 3: Legacy of Time manages to avoid the pitfalls of the genre and deliver an enjoyable gaming experience with an interesting story, sharp graphics, and a good use of technology." They particularly praised the ability to impersonate NPCs and the usage of this ability in character interactions and puzzles, as well as the ability to examine the pre-rendered surroundings in 360 degrees.

By July 1998, Legacy of Time had sold 52,269 copies and earned $2,178,771 in the United States, following its release in February. It was developed on a budget of $1.8 million.

During the inaugural Interactive Achievement Awards, the Academy of Interactive Arts & Sciences nominated Legacy of Time for "PC Adventure Game of the Year", which was ultimately awarded to Blade Runner.

In 2011, Adventure Gamers named Legacy of Time the 46th-best adventure game ever released.
