= Lemon (developer) =

American video game developer (1994–1998)

- Company type: Privately held
- Industry: Video games
- Founded: 1994
- Defunct: 1998
- Headquarters: Los Angeles, United States
- Key people: Jacob Andersen, Søren Hannibal
- Products: Amok
- Owner: Jacob Andersen, Søren Hannibal
- Number of employees: 3

Lemon was a video game developer founded in 1994 by Søren Hannibal and Jacob Andersen, who had previously been members of a demoscene group of the same name.

Lemon created the voxel-based 3D shooter Amok for Sega Saturn and PC. A PlayStation version was underway but was ultimately cancelled. Programmer Martin Pollas joined in 1996 to work on the PC version of Amok.

When Lemon's publisher, Scavenger, went bankrupt the team split up. Søren went to work for Shiny Entertainment (creating the Matrix games) while Jacob and Martin joined up with the remaining members of Zyrinx to form Reto-Moto (Hitman series and Freedom Fighters) in 1998.

Before Lemon, Søren and Jacob created the Amiga game Banshee while working at British game developer/publisher Core Design.
