= F13 =

F13, F 13, F.13 or F-13 may refer to:

- F13, a function key on some computer keyboards
- F13, the ICD-10 code for Mental and behavioural disorders due to use of sedatives or hypnotics
- F 13 Norrköping, a former Swedish Air Force wing
- F-13 Superfortress, B-29 Superfortress bombers modified for photographic recon duties
- Italian submarine F13, an Italian Regia Marina (Royal Navy) submarine in commission from 1917 to 1935
- Junkers F.13, the world's first all-metal airliner
- LSWR F13 class, a 1905 British 4-6-0 steam locomotive model
- Florencia 13, a Hispanic gang in Los Angeles
- Fluorine-13 (F-13 or ^{13}F), an isotope of fluorine
- Stephen King's F13, a video game
- f^{13}, Family 13, a group of Greek gospel manuscripts
- Friday the 13th, which is considered an unlucky day in Western superstition
- Friday the 13th (franchise), a series of horror films
- Triskaidekaphobia, the fear of the number 13
- a third generation BMW 6 Series coupe
- Samsung Galaxy F13, an Android-based smartphone manufactured by Samsung Electronics.
