= Scorcher (video game) =

1996 video game

- European Saturn cover art
- Developer: Zyrinx
- Publishers: MS-DOS, Windows; Scavenger; Sega Saturn; Sega
- Composer: Jesper Kyd
- Platforms: MS-DOS, Windows, Saturn
- Release: Windows: NA: December 1996; EU: 1997; Saturn: NA: March 1, 1997; EU: May 15, 1997
- Genre: Racing
- Mode: Single-player

Scorcher is a futuristic racing video game by Danish developer Zyrinx, released in 1996 for the PC and in 1997 for the Sega Saturn. Originally announced under the name "Vertigo", the game focuses on special motorcycles that reach up to 450 km/h racing through dangerous tracks in a dystopian year 2021.

== Gameplay ==
Scorcher is a futuristic racing game in which players control high-speed motorcycles enclosed within spherical protective frames. The vehicles can reach speeds of up to 450 km/h and travel across six courses featuring steep slopes, tunnels, spiralling sections, jumps and other obstacles. Players can use boosts and collect items while navigating the tracks.

The game features three modes: Championship, Time Attack and Practice. Championship involves competing against computer-controlled opponents, while Time Attack focuses on achieving the fastest completion times.

== Development ==
Scorcher was developed by Danish studio Zyrinx for publisher Scavenger. Originally announced as Vertigo, it was conceived as a futuristic racing game designed to demonstrate the three-dimensional capabilities of the Sega Saturn. Pre-release coverage in Maximum in November 1995 highlighted its detailed environments, steep slopes and elaborate track layouts.

In January 1996, Edge reported that the game's graphics engine employed light-source shading, depth fading and simulated ray tracing. Sega was sufficiently impressed by its technical performance to distribute a demonstration to third-party developers as an example of the Saturn's graphical capabilities. In March 1996, Mean Machines Sega reported that the game remained in development, with an anticipated release during spring 1996. The Saturn version was ultimately released in 1997.

== Reception ==
Reception

Review scores
Publication	Score	
Publication	PC	Saturn
AllGame	2/5	2/5
CNET Gamecenter	2/10	2/10
Computer Games Strategy Plus	1/5	N/A
Computer and Video Games	2/5	N/A
Edge	7/10	N/A
Electronic Gaming Monthly	N/A	6.125/10
Famitsu	N/A	21/40
GameSpot	7.2/10	5.6/10
Next Generation	N/A	2/5
Saturn Power	N/A	78/100
Sega Saturn Magazine	N/A	70%

Though the Saturn version of Scorcher was hyped in the press during its development, the completed game underwhelmed most critics upon release. Reviews typically commented that despite its prolonged development cycle, Scorcher's graphics were still cutting edge, but that the gameplay design is flawed and overall mediocre. Lee Nutter of Sega Saturn Magazine, for example, called it "A graphically excellent racing title where the gameplay appears to have been more of an afterthought than an integral part of the game.", and Next Generation summarized that "Scorcher is a good game, with many things going for it, but Scavenger's preoccupation with making it look cool rather than play great make it a sad epitaph for the once-promising company."

Most critics complained at the lack of a multiplayer mode, but they otherwise varied in what exactly held back Scorcher's gameplay. GamePro found the controls, particularly the use of separate buttons to execute hard turns, were too difficult. (Note: GamePro gave the Saturn version 3/5 for graphics, 4/5 for sound, 2.5/5 for control, and 2.5/5 for fun factor.) Jeff Gerstmann, writing for GameSpot, said that it was simply too generic, while James Price of Saturn Power cited a lack of variety in the tracks. Lee Nutter agreed on this point, and additionally felt the concept of an obstacle-laden, platformer-influenced racing track was fundamentally flawed. He also criticized that "there are only three other competitors". Sushi-X of Electronic Gaming Monthly felt these competitors offered no challenge, and the track obstacles suffer from poor collision detection. His three co-reviewers defended the game, saying that it seems awful at first but is enjoyable once one masters the difficult controls. They gave it scores of 7.0 and 7.5 out of 10, while Sushi-X gave it a 3.0/10. Next Generation contended that few gamers would be willing to work their way over this frustrating learning curve, particularly complaining at the steep increase in difficulty on the third track and the fact that players who fall down a pit are respawned right in front of the same pit. In Japan, where the Saturn version was ported and published by Acclaim Japan on August 22, 1997, Famitsu gave it a score of 21 out of 40.

According to a sales ranking compiled by Tec Toy marketing analyst Kleber de Almeida and published by UOL in November 2004, Scorcher was the company's best-selling Sega Saturn game in Brazil, followed by Virtua Cop 2 and Cyber Speedway.
