= McFarlane's Evil Prophecy =

2004 video game

- Developer: Konami Computer Entertainment Hawaii
- Publisher: Konami
- Director: Graham Morris
- Producer: Terry Fitzgerald
- Designers: Kenichiro Imaizumi; Kazuhiko Takata; Hitoshi Matsuda; Sean Eyestone; Jun Nakagawa; Mitsuhiro Nomi; Hideya Sugiyama; Mitsuru Sugiyama
- Composer: Jesper Kyd
- Platform: PlayStation 2
- Release: NA: June 15, 2004; EU: October 15, 2004
- Genre: Action
- Modes: Single-player, multiplayer

McFarlane's Evil Prophecy is a PlayStation 2 action video game released in North America and Europe in 2004.

== Story ==
In the 19th century, the dead are rising from their graves and other chaos is happening all over the world. People fear that the end of the world is coming. A book predicts that an eternal age of darkness on Earth is beginning. Dr. Hans Jaeger summons three of the best monster hunters in the world to fight the evil creatures: Logan the pirate, Delphine the gunslinger, and Sundano, a mystical African warrior. Among the monsters are Dracula, Frankenstein's monster, the werewolf, the mummy, the sea creature, and the voodoo queen.

== Gameplay ==
Players battle creatures based on a line of Todd McFarlane's action figures including classic movie monsters such as Frankenstein's monster and Dracula. The gameplay is similar to that of the Dynasty Warriors series. The visual presentation and monsters are fairly detailed, such as Frankenstein, who carries the corpse of his creator strapped to his back. Bonuses include an art gallery and interviews with creator Todd McFarlane.

== Reception ==
Reception

Aggregate score
Aggregator	Score
Metacritic	34/100

Review scores
Publication	Score
Electronic Gaming Monthly	2.67/10
Game Informer	4/10
GameRevolution	F
GameSpot	6.2/10
GameSpy	1/5
GameZone	5.5/10
IGN	2.5/10
PlayStation Official Magazine – UK	2/10
Official U.S. PlayStation Magazine	0.5/5
PlayStation: The Official Magazine	5/10

The game received "unfavorable" reviews according to the review aggregation website Metacritic. Game Informer listed the game among the worst horror games of all-time in 2008.
