= WCW/nWo Thunder =

1999 video game

- Cover art featuring (clockwise from upper left) Goldberg, Diamond Dallas Page, Hollywood Hogan and The Giant
- Developer: Inland Productions
- Publisher: THQ
- Producer: D. Scott Williamson
- Designers: D. Scott Williamson; Mike Cihak; Arnie Boedecker
- Programmers: D. Scott Williamson; Darin Peterson; John Sanderson
- Composers: Mike Cihak; Matt Scott
- Platform: PlayStation
- Release: NA: January 12, 1999; EU: February 12, 1999
- Genres: Sports
- Modes: Single-player, multiplayer

WCW/nWo Thunder is a professional wrestling video game based on the professional wrestling television show of the same name, developed by Inland Productions and released on the PlayStation console by THQ in January 1999. Thunder is the sequel to WCW Nitro and updates the previous game with new characters and features, including cage matches, battle royals, weapon use, and the ability to select what stable each wrestler competed for (this included WCW, nWo Hollywood, nWo Wolfpac, Raven's Flock, and The Four Horsemen). However, Thunder received poor reviews. Many of these were due to its graphics, style, and overall atmosphere, which bore too many similarities to WCW Nitro, along with concerns that the game was too easy.

New versions of the game's predecessor Nitro were released for Microsoft Windows (in December 1998 shortly before Thunder's release) and Nintendo 64 (in February 1999 shortly after Thunder's release). Both versions featured the updated roster from Thunder.

== Reception ==
Reception

Aggregate score
Aggregator	Score
GameRankings	58%

Review scores
Publication	Score
AllGame	1.5/5
Electronic Gaming Monthly	6/10
Game Informer	4.75/10
GameRevolution	C−
GameSpot	5.4/10
IGN	6.6/10
Next Generation	3/5
PlayStation Official Magazine – UK	3/10
Official U.S. PlayStation Magazine	1/5
PlayStation: The Official Magazine	3/5

Next Generation gave the game three stars out of five. They commented that while the improvements made in Thunder are incremental and not "spectacular", they felt the game to be a worthy upgrade from the previous title Nitro.

WCW/nWo Thunder received "mixed" reviews according to the review aggregation website GameRankings. Most very mixed points were given to the poor graphics, and difficulty of the controls. Despite the mediocre reviews given, the game went on to sell 1 million copies.

== See also ==
- List of licensed wrestling video games
