= Bass Masters Classic: Tournament Edition =

1998 video game

- Developer: Inland Productions
- Publisher: THQ
- Platform: Windows
- Release: September 8, 1998
- Genre: Fishing

Bass Masters Classic: Tournament Edition is a 1998 3D fishing video game from THQ. It is the official game of the Bass Anglers Sportsman Society.

== Gameplay ==
Bass Masters Classic Tournament Edition is a fishing simulation game that immerses players in the competitive world of bass fishing, modeled after the real-life Bassmaster Classic tournament. The gameplay revolves around catching up to five bass per day, with the goal of landing the biggest fish possible. Players begin by configuring their gear: seven rods can be customized with various lures, actions, and rigs. This setup can be done before heading out to save time during the tournament. Once on the lake, players have eight simulated hours to fish each day, and being late to weigh-in results in penalties. The game offers multiple modes—arcade, practice, amateur, and professional—across three difficulty levels. Elements like changing weather and water conditions affect fish behavior. Players control their boat with a trolling motor and can cast using overhead, flip, or pitch techniques. Casting is guided by a user-friendly interface, and players can access hints via short AVI clips featuring Bass Master champions. An underwater view shows how fish react to bait.

== Development ==
The game was developed by Inland Productions, a company founded in 1996. The game was originally scheduled to be released in August 1998 but was ultimately released on September 8, 1998. The game uses a 3D technology in reproducing what it's like to fish real lakes in competition.

== Reception ==
Reception

Review scores
Publication	Score
PC Gamer	82%
PC PowerPlay	76%
Ultimate PC	58/100

Aaron Curtiss from the Los Angeles Times said "Not my cup of tea, but I can see how die-hard fishermen might enjoy having it loaded on their PC at work for a few casts during conference calls."

Roy Bassave from The Miami Herald said "Bass Masters Classic's best feature is the Force-Feedback support that allows anglers to feel a jerk on the joystick when a fish bites. Overall the level of interaction is much like such golf games as Tiger Woods from EA.
