= Hawaii High: Mystery of the Tiki =

1994 video game

- Developer: Sanctuary Woods
- Director: Tyler McKenzie
- Producer: Tyler McKenzie
- Artist: Andrew Pratt
- Writer: Trina Robbins
- Composer: John O'Kennedy
- Platforms: Microsoft Windows, Macintosh
- Release: 1994
- Genre: Adventure

Hawaii High: Mystery of the Tiki is a 1994 girl-themed video game developed by Sanctuary Woods. The game, set in Hawaii, is the first video game targeting girls. While the game was not a commercial success, some commentators noted that certain elements later appeared in games targeting girls.

== Gameplay ==
Hawaii High, the first game targeted specifically to girls, is described as an interactive story rather than adventure game by Game Developer. The player clicks hotspots to interact with the environment and completes a series of puzzles and minigames to progress through the story.

The player takes the role of Jennifer, who recently moved to Hawaii from New York City, and her Hawaiian friend Maleah, who go on a mission to discover the stolen sacred Tiki god carving. The game features a story map, allowing the player continue from where they left of lose.

The game takes place in Hawaii, with elements of Hawaiian fantasy and mythology. While developers assume that girls like fantasy, researchers suggested that they actually like "themes based in reality", according to Game Developer.

== Development ==
Hawaii High is written by Trina Robbins, an American cartoonist. In an interview, Robbins said she wanted to write a comic for girls all the time. She particularly loves Hawaii and wanted to write an adventure set there. Her idea was rejected because of the view that girls don't read comics. Disappointed at comics, Robbins proposed her idea to the gaming industry and was noticed by Sanctuary Woods.

In Game Developer, Robbins said the game was inspired by Nancy Drew mysteries popular among younger girls, including adventure and problem-solving. While Robbins described the development as "easygoing", she also complained about some elements developed by the team, which she found "impossible". In Game Developer, Robbins complained some puzzles, such as a three-dimensional maze, as elements that "work least well in the game", which were proposed by male programmers to "make the game more exciting". She argued that such puzzles would annoy any player and would likely be disliked by girls.

== Reception ==
The game was not a commercial success and did not change the industry's view of gaming targeting girls at the time. While Justine Cassell believed the failure was due to the game's low budget, she noted some features of the game were introduced by other games targeting girls, such as character-based plots, issues of friendship and social relationships, and graphics.

Ayelet Sela, director of the documentary Video and Computer Games; Ice Age or New Age For Women, praised the company for releasing a title targeted at the young female demographic in a male-centric industry. The Los Angeles Times felt that, despite its good intentions, the game was "dreadful". Wired praised the game for teaching players Hawaiian culture and language. Authors of Feminist Cyberscapes: Mapping Gendered Academic Spaces felt the mystery-laden title offered a less stereotypical gaming experience targeted at girls.

Some press criticized the game's dress-up game and a character's pink attire, calling it sexist. Robbins called the criticism "throwing the baby out with the bath water", responding that Girls do wear pink and like dress-up games.
