= Red Zone (1994 video game) =

1994 video game

- North American cover art
- Developer: Zyrinx
- Publisher: Time Warner Interactive
- Designers: Mikael Balle; Jesper Vorsholt
- Programmers: David Guldbrandsen; Karsten L. Hvidberg; Jens Albretsen; Thomas Risager (hidden mini game)
- Composer: Jesper Kyd
- Platform: Sega Genesis
- Release: NA/PAL: November 1994
- Genre: Scrolling shooter
- Mode: Single-player

Red Zone is a 1994 scrolling shooter video game developed by Zyrinx and published by Time Warner Interactive for the Sega Genesis. The player switches between piloting a helicopter and walking around on foot, both can be played from a top-down and first-person point of view. The game is notable for its use of several technologies that were not prevalent at the time on the Genesis, such as full-screen rotation, 3D vectors, real-time zoom, and full-motion video.

Zyrinx released a beta version of the game into the public domain, which is believed to have been done out of respect for their roots as a demogroup.

== Plot ==
A military takes over a small fictional country called Zyristan. Mass deportation and torture are occurring in the country during the annexation. Zyristan invades a small neighboring country in response to the annexation. Meanwhile, a dictator threatens the world with nuclear missiles shot at one country at a time.

== Reception ==
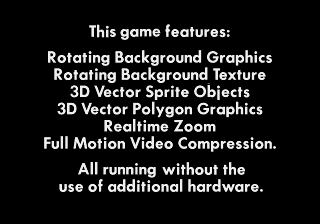
Red Zone's intro boasting about the game's technical capabilities.

Electronic Gaming Monthly rated the game 6.8 out of 10, praising its combat and aerial sequences as "innovative" while noting its difficulty and learning curve. They also mentioned the amount of weapons and missions available to the player.

GamePro praised the helicopter handling and graphical intro, but concluded that the poor controls when maneuvering characters on the ground effectively killed any potential enjoyment.

Next Generation rated the game 3 out of 5 stars, stating that "While Red Zone's plot and gameplay are known as 'rip-offs' from Urban Strike, the enormous challenges fundamentally make this title a viable alternative to the ongoing success of the Strike series."

=== Commercial performance ===
While the exact sales numbers are unknown, sales of Red Zone sales were described as "limited" due to the game being released late into the Genesis' lifespan.
