= Star Trek: Hidden Evil =

1999 video game

- Developer: Presto Studios
- Publishers: NA: Activision; EU: Empire Interactive
- Producer: Tim Tembreull
- Designers: Eric Dallaire; Victor Navone
- Programmer: Michael Saladino
- Artist: Daniel D. Gregoire
- Writer: Eric Dallaire
- Composer: Jamey Scott
- Platform: Microsoft Windows
- Release: NA: November 22, 1999; EU: December 10, 1999
- Genres: Third-person shooter, action-adventure
- Mode: Single player

Star Trek: Hidden Evil is a third-person action-adventure video game released in 1999 by Activision. It was developed by Presto Studios over the course of a year, and was specifically created for the casual gamer market. The plot followed up on the events in the film Star Trek: Insurrection, with the player portraying the character of Ensign Sovok, who works alongside Captain Jean-Luc Picard and Lt. Cmdr Data, with Patrick Stewart and Brent Spiner reprising their roles.

== Plot ==
The game is a sequel to the ninth Star Trek movie, Star Trek: Insurrection. The Son'a and the Ba'ku now live in peace on the planet, and a Starfleet outpost has been set up to monitor the situation. Son'a construction uncovers ancient ruins and Captain Jean-Luc Picard is sent to investigate.

The player plays the character of Ensign Sovok, who becomes embroiled in a plot to harness the destructive powers of a coveted genetic seed. The player must engage alien forces and outwit foes in a series of missions, to prevent the Federation from falling victim to the Romulans.

== Gameplay ==
Similar to the Resident Evil series of games, the characters in Hidden Evil are modeled using 3D computer graphics and move around a static two-dimensional background using Tank controls. As the character moves from screen to screen, the static camera angle changes each time. The player also makes use of a variety of items from the Star Trek universe such as phasers, tricorders, hyposprays and the communicator, which allows the player to contact Picard and Data.

== Development ==
Presto Studios were hired by Activision to create a tie-in game for Star Trek: Insurrection. One requirement was that the game had to come out before Christmas, 1999, giving Presto a year to develop the entire game. They required Presto to make a game based on missions, but would appeal to casual gamers as research conducted by Activision showed the PC Gamers avoided Star Trek games as they seemed to be too difficult.

== Reception ==
Reception

Aggregate score
Aggregator	Score
GameRankings	53%

Review scores
Publication	Score
Adventure Gamers	2.5/5
AllGame	3/5
CNET Gamecenter	5/10
Computer Games Strategy Plus	2.5/5
EP Daily	5/10
Game Informer	8/10
GamePro	2.5/5
GameRevolution	C
GameSpot	4.5/10
GameZone	8.4/10
IGN	4/10
Next Generation	3/5
PC Accelerator	4/10
PC Gamer (US)	35%

The game received mixed reviews according to the review aggregation website GameRankings.

Jef Shoults of IGN said that the cut scenes in the game were "well done but a bit grainy", but criticized the complexity of the puzzles and thought that it was too short, referring to it as merely a game demo. Stephen Poole of GameSpot described the character animations during dialogue sequences as "singularly unimpressive", but thought that the variety of the first part of the game was good. However, he said that the game "plummets like a rock" once the player departs Ba'ku. He described the combat sequences as "uniformly uninteresting" and thought that the game left the gamer with a "bad taste in their mouths that's likely to linger for a long time." Jim Preston of NextGen said that the game was "prettier than Tasha Yar – sadly, it's shorter, too."

Joshua Mintzer played the game for Adventure Classic Gaming, and compared it to Star Trek: The Next Generation – A Final Unity. He thought that while A Final Unity seemed grand in scope, Hidden Evil seemed more like a Star Trek comic book. Mintzer described Hidden Evil as "2,891 phaser shots connected by some irrelevant puzzles". He thought the game seemed rushed and thought it made a mockery of the earlier and better Star Trek games such as A Final Unity and Star Trek: Judgment Rites. Carl Nguyen of AllGame praised the graphics in the game, saying that they were "some of the best graphics for a third person adventure game, with smooth motion-captured animation and odd but beautiful scenery." However, he also criticized the replay value of the game, saying, "don't count on playing Star Trek: Hidden Evil a second time unless you're really bored."

The game sold 41,419 units in the U.S. by November 2000, according to PC Data.
