= The Journeyman Project: Pegasus Prime =

1997 video game

- Developer: Presto Studios
- Publishers: Bandai; Acclaim
- Directors: Jack H. Davis (game); Michel Kripalani (live action)
- Producers: Jack H. Davis (game); Patrick Rogers (live action)
- Designer: Tommy Yune
- Artists: Jack H. Davis; Tommy Yune; Leif Einarsson
- Writers: Jack H. Davis; Patrick Rogers
- Composer: Bob Stewart
- Series: The Journeyman Project
- Platforms: Mac OS, Apple Pippin, PlayStation, Mac OS X, Windows, Linux
- Release: June 1997 (Mac OS); December 2013 (Mac OS X); April 10, 2014 (Windows, Linux)
- Genre: Adventure game
- Mode: Single-player

The Journeyman Project: Pegasus Prime is an adventure computer game developed by Presto Studios and published by Bandai in 1997. It is a complete remake of the original Journeyman Project, using some of the actors from The Journeyman Project 2: Buried in Time.

== Story and gameplay ==
Like the original, this game is played from a first-person perspective, but static location images have been upgraded with walk animations like The Journeyman Project 2: Buried in Time.

The story follows the actions of Temporal Agent Gage Blackwood who travels to three separate points of past to stop three androids who attempt to change history.

== Disc layout ==
Pegasus Prime was split over 4 CD-ROMs. The layout is as follows:

- Disc 1: Caldoria, Norad Alpha
- Disc 2: TSA, Prehistoric Island
- Disc 3: Morimoto Mars Colony
- Disc 4: World Science Center, Norad Delta

Discs 1, 3 and 4 included a "Tiny TSA" which included only the inside of the Pegasus Device. This was included so an additional disc-swap was not required when changing between the 3 time zones.

== Development and release ==
Originally announced as a "Director's Cut", Pegasus Prime featured enhanced graphics, sounds, movies, and puzzles. The new live action video sequences were recorded with a green screen. Pegasus Prime was released solely for the Power Macintosh by Bandai Digital Entertainment in North America. In addition, the title was released in Japan for the Apple Pippin and PlayStation. Presto made plans to port the game to the PlayStation and Sega Saturn in the U.S., but these versions were cancelled when disappointing sales on several games forced publisher Sanctuary Woods to undergo massive layoffs and a corporate restructuring. Acclaim Entertainment later took on publishing the PlayStation version in North America, but this release was cancelled again.

By the fall of 2012 the game began to be supported by beta versions of ScummVM, making it playable for platforms which support this VM. However it requires extraction of the game files from the original CDs (which are written with Apple Macintosh Hierarchical File System) to a hard disk.

In December 2013, the game was released on DVD-ROM for Mac OS X. Windows and Linux versions were made available in March 2014.

The game was released for digital download on GOG.com in 2014 and Steam in 2017.
