= Jesper Kyd =

Danish composer and sound designer (born 1972)

- Kyd in 2019

Background information
- Born: Jesper Kyd Jakobson; 3 February 1972 (age 54); Hørsholm, Denmark
- Genres: Contemporary classical; choral; electronica; ambient; minimal techno; IDM
- Occupations: Composer; sound designer
- Years active: 1986–present
- Labels: Sumthing Else; La-La Land
- Website: www.jesperkyd.com

Jesper Kyd Jakobson (/ˈdʒɛspər ˈkɪd/; Danish: Jesper Kyd Jakobson [ˈjespɐ ˈkʰyt ˈjɑkʰʌpsʌn]; born 3 February 1972) is a Danish composer and sound designer who has worked on various video game, television, and film projects. He has composed soundtracks for the Hitman series, Assassin's Creed series, Borderlands series, Darksiders II, Freedom Fighters, and State of Decay, among many others. His scores use orchestra, choir, acoustic manipulations and electronic soundscapes.

== Biography ==
=== Early years ===
Kyd started playing the piano at an early age. Later, he took several years of training in classical guitar, note reading, choir singing and classical composition for piano. However, he is mostly self-taught. Kyd started using computers for composing on a Commodore 64 at age 14, and later an Amiga. He and Mikael Balle became members of the demogroup Silents DK, and later started collaborating with a group of coders known as Crionics. They eventually made the Amiga demoscene production Hardwired. Kyd also created and scored the first wild demo, Global Trash 2, together with Mikael Balle.

Kyd then left the demoscene and started to work as a game musician. He and others created the computer game developer Zyrinx and a game called Sub-Terrania for the Sega Genesis. The team then relocated to Boston. Kyd composed music for two additional Zyrinx titles, Red Zone and Scorcher and the music for two externally developed games, Amok and The Adventures of Batman and Robin for the Sega Genesis. Zyrinx dissolved when their game publisher Scavenger went bankrupt.

=== Freelance ===
Many former Zyrinx members returned to Denmark to start IO Interactive, but Kyd moved to New York City and set up his own sound studio in Manhattan called "Nano studios". He then worked as a freelance video game musician.

The soundtrack to Hitman: Codename 47 was based on urban soundscapes and ethnic instrumentation. He then recorded the soundtrack of Hitman 2: Silent Assassin with 110 musicians of the Budapest Symphony Orchestra and Hungarian Radio Choir. He recorded the score for the action/adventure Freedom Fighters with the Hungarian Radio choir. It was described by Film Score Monthly Magazine as "Vangelis on steroids". He used modern electronica and symphonic and choral music in Hitman: Contracts. Kyd followed up with Hitman: Blood Money, also performed by the Budapest Symphony Orchestra and Hungarian Radio Choir.

Kyd then provided a cinematic middle eastern-based score for Ubisoft's Assassin's Creed. This was followed by the soundtrack for Assassin's Creed II (2009), Assassin's Creed: Brotherhood (2010), and Assassin's Creed: Revelations (2011), the latter in collaboration with Lorne Balfe. Kyd was personally responsible for composing the now-famous "Ezio's Family" for Assassin's Creed II; the track would become the unofficial theme of the Assassin's Creed franchise, being remixed and sampled in every subsequent soundtrack in the franchise. Kyd also wrote music for several games in the Borderlands franchise, as well as the soundtrack for Darksiders II, notable for being his first entirely non-digital score. In 2020, Kyd returned to the Assassin's Creed franchise with Assassin's Creed: Valhalla, alongside Sarah Schachner and Einar Selvik.

Kyd composed the soundtrack of Warhammer 40,000: Darktide, which released in 2022. Kyd sought to create a score that would fit a retro-futuristic setting, and avoided using orchestral elements and guitars, which were typically found in other Warhammer games. The score was inspired by "cyberpunk culture and sci-fi manga," with the main instruments including drum machines and modular synths.

== Influences ==
Jesper Kyd's influences include composers such as Ottorino Respighi, Igor Stravinsky, Jean-Michel Jarre, Vangelis, Mike Oldfield, John Williams, Jerry Goldsmith, and bands such as Röyksopp, the Knife, Pink Floyd, and Underworld.

== Works ==
=== Video games ===
Year	Title	Notes
1990	U.S.S. John Young	
1993	Pro Moves Soccer	
1993	Sub-Terrania	
1994	Red Zone	
1995	The Adventures of Batman & Robin	Sega Mega Drive/Genesis version
1996	Amok	
1996	Scorcher	
1999	Time Tremors	
1999	Alien Nations	
2000	MDK2	with Albert Olson and Raymond Watts
2000	Messiah	
2000	Soldier	
2000	Hitman: Codename 47	
2001	The Nations: Alien Nations 2	
2001	LightWeight Ninja	with Eric Heberling, Speier Music Productions and REMedia
2001	Shattered Galaxy	
2002	Minority Report: The Video Game	
2002	Hitman 2: Silent Assassin	
2003	Brute Force	with James Hannigan
2003	Freedom Fighters	
2003	Wirtschaftsgiganten - Die Ultimative Collection	
2003	Prisms of Light 2	
2004	McFarlane's Evil Prophecy	
2004	Hitman: Contracts	
2004	Robotech: Invasion	
2004	Dance Dance Revolution Ultramix 2	
2005	Tom Clancy's Splinter Cell: Chaos Theory	with Amon Tobin
2005	Dance Dance Revolution STR!KE	
2006	Hitman: Blood Money	
2006	Close Quarters Conflict	
2007	Kane & Lynch: Dead Men	
2007	Assassin's Creed	
2007	Unreal Tournament 3	with Rom Di Prisco
2008	The Club	main theme
2008	The Chronicles of Spellborn	
2009	Borderlands	with Cris Velasco, Sascha Dikiciyan, and Raison Varner
2009	Assassin's Creed II	
2010	Assassin's Creed: Brotherhood	
2011	Forza Motorsport 4	
2011	Assassin's Creed: Revelations	with Lorne Balfe
2012	Soulcalibur V	with several others
2012	Darksiders II	
2012	Transformers: Prime - The Game	with several others
2012	Borderlands 2	with Cris Velasco, Sascha Dikiciyan, and Raison Varner
2013	State of Decay	with Dreissk
2013	Soldiers Inc.	
2013	Sparta: War of Empires	
2014	Pirates: Tides of Fortune	
2014	Stormfall: Age of War	
2014	Heroes & Generals	
2014	Borderlands: The Pre-Sequel!	with Des Shore and Justin Mullins
2015	Moonrise	with Jeff Broadbent
2015	Warhammer: End Times - Vermintide	
2016	Robinson: The Journey	
2017	MU Legend	
2017	Battle Chasers: Nightwar	
2018	Warhammer: Vermintide 2	
2018	State of Decay 2	with Dreissk
2019	Borderlands 3	with Michael McCann, Finishing Move Inc., Raison Varner
2020	Assassin's Creed Valhalla	with Sarah Schachner and Einar Selvik
2022	Dune: Spice Wars	with Quentin Malapel
2022	Warhammer 40,000: Darktide	
2026	Samson	
2027	State of Decay 3	Development in progress
TBA	No Law	Development in progress
N/A	Wonder Woman	Canceled

=== Films ===
Key
†	Denotes films that have not yet been released

Year	Title
2000	Night All Day
2006	Sweet Insanity
2006	Death of a Saleswoman
2007	La Passion de Jeanne d'Arc (1928, new score)
2008	Staunton Hill
2010	A Perfect Soldier
2015	Chronicles of the Ghostly Tribe
2018	Tumbbad
2025	Crazxy
2027	Tumbbad 2 †

=== Short films ===
Year	Title
2000	Organizm
2001	The Lion Tamer
2001	Going with Neill
2002	Day Pass
2002	Paper Plane Man
2002	Pure
2003	Cycle
2006	Impulse
2006	Virus
2010	The Auctioneers
2011	Somnolence
2011	Assassin's Creed: Embers
2023	RAID: Call of the Arbiter

=== TV series ===
Year	Title
2009	The Resistance
2012-13	Métal Hurlant Chronicles

== Awards ==
Year	Title	Notes
2005	BAFTA Award for Best Original Music	For Hitman: Contracts
2005	G.A.N.G. Award for Best Cinematic/Cut-Scene Audio	
2009	G.A.N.G. Award for Music of the Year	
2009	Hollywood Music in Media Award	
2018	Nile Rodgers Global Creators Award	

=== Nominations ===
Year	Title
2004	G.A.N.G Award for "Best Original Vocal Song – Choral"
2004	Billboard Digital Entertainment Awards nomination for Best Use of Soundtrack
2006	MTV's Video Music Awards in the Best Video Game Score category
