= Pro Moves Soccer =

1993 video game

- Cover art
- Developers: BGS Developments; ZAT Productions
- Publisher: ASCII Entertainment
- Composer: Jesper Kyd
- Platform: Sega Genesis
- Release: NA: November 1993
- Genre: Sports game
- Modes: Single-player, multiplayer

Pro Moves Soccer is a soccer video game developed by Danish studios BGS Developments and ZAT Productions and published by ASCII Entertainment for the Sega Genesis in North America. The game was released in 1993, and was based on the fictional Asciiware World Sports league.

== Gameplay ==
Sample gameplay of Pro Moves Soccer, with goaltender P. O'Brian stopping an attempted shot into the goal

The game itself features international level soccer matchups and customizable options that makes a game anywhere from the length of a childhood soccer match (3 minute halves) to the length of an actual FIFA soccer match (45 minute halves). As long as they can remember the lengthy passwords, players can also make their own soccer teams. The game's announcer uses brief words and phrases to describe the action (i.e., kick-off, yellow card, red card, penalty shot, head shot, header, rainbow kick).

Players can either play exhibition, World Cup, practice, or Eight Nations tournament (where eight nations compete to win the championship, making for shorter gameplay). This game has a medium difficulty level and can be mastered with repeated gameplay. Teams can choose to concede from either of the tournaments at any time without dire consequences. Fictional players play for each team (nations range from Argentina to Jamaica and Russia).

Different weather conditions can be activated on the option screen; including sunny days, cloudy days, rainy days and snowy days. Fouls can be deactivated, allowing less experienced players to tackle the opposition without the fear of either a yellow card or a red card. Injuries can appear in the game as a result of rough play. Being tackled an excessive number of times can also cause a player to get injured. Failure to substitute an injured player results in him losing his abilities for the remainder of the game.

== Reception ==
GamePro gave the game a score of 3 out of 5 while Game Players gave it a score of 60%.
