= Sparta: War of Empires =

2014 video game

- Developer: Plarium
- Publisher: Plarium
- Composer: Jesper Kyd
- Platform: Browser
- Release: WW: 2014
- Genre: MMORTS

Sparta: War of Empires is a MMO strategy video game developed and published by Plarium. The game was released for web browser in 2014. The game is available for free, with paid upgrades available.

== Premise and gameplay ==
The game is set in 5th Century BCE Greece, during a war between Sparta and the Persian Empire. Xerxes and his army have set out to conquer Greece, leaving the lands of Hellas in a state of devastation.

In order to succeed in the game, players must take control of ancient warriors, master the weaponry of the era, and grow their resources gained through fighting other players.

Each player becomes the Archon of their city, building it from scratch. Players must protect their city-state with the help of King Leonidas and the Spartan army, using a combination of diplomacy, strategy and war.

== Music ==
The game features a fully scored soundtrack and sound composed and produced by BAFTA-winning composer Jesper Kyd. The track “Hellas” from the game is included on his 2015 album, Five Worlds of Plarium.

== Critical reception ==
Sparta: War of Empires

Review scores
| Publication | Score |
|---|---|
| Gameranks | 7.6/10 |
| Browsergames.de | 3.5/5 |

Sparta: War of Empires has received generally positive reviews, with Gamespresso editor-in-chief Alana Fearnall writing that "if the developers can support a large community base over time, Sparta: War of Empires is worth playing". Giovanni Damiano of Gamerbrain praises the game as "engaging, fun and exciting" but the game has been criticized for being costly for in game purchases.
