= Whacked! =

2002 video game

- North American box art
- Developer: Presto Studios
- Publisher: Microsoft Game Studios
- Designer: Phil Saunders
- Composer: Jamey Scott
- Engine: Sprint Engine
- Platform: Xbox
- Release: NA: October 15, 2002; EU: November 29, 2002; JPN: January 16, 2003
- Genre: Party
- Modes: Single-player, multiplayer

Whacked! is a 2002 party video game developed by Presto Studios and published by Microsoft Game Studios for the Xbox. It was one of two original games to be made available for Xbox Live, and received mixed reviews. Whacked! was the last game developed by Presto Studios before it went defunct.

== Gameplay ==
Whacked! is played as a series of arena style mini-games. The player competes with three other players, human or artificial intelligence, to complete a specific objective, and players can use a variety of weapons and power-ups to affect the game. Possible objectives include collecting stars for points, deathmatch, king of the hill, holding a trophy to earn points, and elimination style dodgeball. Single player has the addition gamemode of chicken, in which many flesh-eating chickens pursue the player, and the player has to destroy them first.

Arenas include the site of a car crash, the ceiling of a bathroom, a plaza, the space underneath a Christmas Tree, an oil pipeline, a heavily fortified front yard, a space station, a toy pirate ship in an electrified bathtub, an arena with spiked walls, the tops of skyscrapers, the back of a pickup truck during a police chase, and a kitchen sink. Hell is unlocked after completing the game.

Game show mode is the main single-player story mode, in which the player chooses one of three doors to determine the gamemode and arena. Each set of three doors makes up one stage, and each of the four stages becomes successively more difficult and the matches become longer. Battle mode allows players to play against one another and choose all of the settings the mini-game. As of the game's release, battle mode could be played through split screen, system link, or Xbox Live. While Xbox Live for the original Xbox was discontinued in 2010, Whacked! is now playable online using the replacement Xbox online servers called Insignia.

== Story ==
Whacked! takes place on the set of a game show in which seven contestants compete for The Prize, which will be anything in the world that the contestant desires. To win The Prize, the contestants compete across four stages of violent battles and competitions. While the contestants compete, Van Tastic speaks to his boss over the phone, reassuring him that it's impossible to win and that there is no prize. After the player's character wins the game, Van Tastic's boss calls him again and cancels the show. Van Tastic challenges the winner to a final competition for an even better grand prize. After the contestant agrees, Van Tastic destroys the set, revealing it to be Hell. He burns the other contestants to death, and reveals himself to be a demon. After the winner defeats Van Tastic, his boss calls him to renew the show.

== Characters ==
There are seven playable contestants, each based on one of the seven deadly sins, as well as a host that becomes playable after completing the game.

- Lucky: A Scottish rabbit suffering from manic rage following the removal of his feet for good luck charms. He represents the concept of wrath. After winning, he receives a bionic arm with a gun.
- Eugene: A flightless Canadian bird resembling a penguin that wishes he could fly. He lives with his mother and is outwardly meek, but his inner monologue is harsh and bitter. He represents the concept of envy. After winning, he receives cardboard cutouts of "everything in the world", which then leaves him still unsatisfied.
- Toof: An unintelligible monster that was developed from a single cell to clean oil spills by eating the oil. He suffers from a constant hunger and is always looking for things to eat. He represents the concept of gluttony. After winning, he receives a giant hamburger.
- Lucy: A manipulative woman that uses her sex appeal to her advantage. Her plastic dress bursts apart in the opening cut scene, and her character is covered by two censor bars throughout the game. She represents the concept of lust. After winning, she receives Otto's chair.
- Lance: A humanoid lion that suffers from narcissism. He represents the concept of pride. After winning, he receives a duplicate of himself.
- Charity: A spoiled little girl that attempts to take everything as her own. She represents the concept of greed. After winning, she receives countless wrapped gifts.
- Otto: A slim, pale man that is asleep in his armchair for the duration of the game. His chair is self-aware and competes on Otto's behalf. He represents the concept of sloth. After winning, Otto's chair receives Lucy.
- Van Tastic: The host, who appears to be a charismatic human but is revealed to be a demonic creature. He represents the concept of evil.

== Development ==
The concept for Whacked! was first conceived in the mid-1990s as a casual multiplayer game to compete against Mario Kart 64, with a similar low barrier to entry and mechanisms to rubber band players between first and last place. During development, testers would regularly test different variations of each in-game element individually before allowing the art team to give it a design. It was also tested without artificial intelligence to prioritize the multiplayer experience and players to adjust to changes in real time without updates to AI. Development was held to a strict schedule, allowing the game to ship three weeks early. Whacked! was originally designed as a PC game, but the game was eventually ported to the Xbox. Development was complicated by two of the three creative designers leaving half way through the project.

Whacked! was one of two games distributed to beta testers for the initial rollout of Xbox Live on the Xbox. The same Live enabled demos were originally given out for one year with the purchase of the Xbox Live starter kit.

Whacked! was the final project released by Presto Studios before it went out of business in 2002. Whacked! is backward compatible on the Xbox 360, albeit with some glitches, including graphics not loading properly or loading screens not displaying.

== Reception ==
Reception

Aggregate score
Aggregator	Score
Metacritic	59/100

Review scores
Publication	Score
AllGame	3/5
EP Daily	6.5/10
Eurogamer	5/10
Famitsu	25/40
Game Informer	2/10
GameSpot	5.6/10
GameSpy	3/5
GameZone	6.7/10
IGN	6.6/10
Official Xbox Magazine (US)	7.3/10
TeamXbox	5.7/10
X-Play	2/5

The game received "mixed or average" reviews according to the review aggregation website Metacritic. Critic Jeff Gerstmann of GameSpot praised the game's style and voice acting, but criticized the gameplay and soundtrack, saying that "The single-player mode is plain and simple, and the multiplayer mode, once you get over the novelty of shooting people over the Internet, really lacks depth." Hilary Goldstein of IGN criticized the drawn-out gameplay and the inconsistency of the gameshow dynamic. In Japan, where the game was ported for release under the name Whacked! Giliaba! Rantō Party Televee! (ワックド！ギリヤバ！乱闘パーティーテレビ！, Wakkudo! Giriyaba! Rantō Pātī Terebi!) on January 16, 2003, Famitsu gave it a score of one six, one seven, and two sixes for a total of 25 out of 40.
