= Zyrinx =

Danish video game developer

Zyrinx was a video game developer founded in 1992 in Copenhagen, Denmark. It consisted exclusively of people who had been active in the Amiga demoscene in the late 1980s and early 1990s, including composer Jesper Kyd.

The first game developed by Zyrinx was Sub-Terrania for the Sega Mega Drive. During the development, the team relocated to Boston. Later, the team developed the games Red Zone and Scorcher. Zyrinx's 3D rendering technology was showcased in a Sega 32X promotion video. The team dissolved in 1998 because their publisher Scavenger went bankrupt.

In 1998, the Zyrinx team reformed under the name Reto-Moto and went on to create IO Interactive and the Hitman series of games. By 2008 the Reto-Moto team had reformed the company and was working on multiplayer focused games.
