= Stephen King's F13 =

2000 video game

- Developer: Presto Studios
- Publisher: Blue Byte
- Platforms: Windows, Macintosh
- Release: GER: 1999; NA: January 21, 2000; UK: February 4, 2000
- Genre: Minigame compilation
- Mode: Single-player

Stephen King's F13 is a Minigame compilation developed by Presto Studios and released in 1999 and 2000 by Blue Byte. The title F13 suggests a function key that would follow F12 on standard PC keyboards.

== Gameplay and contents ==
The collection, which is marketed as "Frightware", includes several minigames. These are:

- No Swimming: a virtual aquarium in which players can feed various animals, including a dog, rhinoceros, and a horse, to the fishes. If the fish are not fed, they lunge against the glass and leave cracks.
- Bug Splat: a whack-a-mole-style game which involves squashing bugs with a hammer, newspaper, or fly swatter.
- Whack-A-Zombie is similar to Bug Splat except the player smashes zombies emerging from graves in a cemetery.

Additionally, the bundle includes a digital copy of Stephen King's short novella Everything's Eventual, a set of "Screamsavers", "Bump and Thump" sound effects, and "Deathtop" backgrounds.

== Reception ==
Reception

Aggregate score
Aggregator	Score
GameRankings	28%

Review scores
Publication	Score
AllGame	3/5
EP Daily	3.5/10
GameSpot	2.6/10
IGN	2.1/10
PC Zone	13%

The game received unfavorable reviews. In a retrospective review, Richard Cobbett of PC Gamer strongly criticized the game, describing it as "Crap, rubbish, claptrap, idiocy, poppycock, twaddle, brainless, dazed, deficient, dense, dim, doltish, dopey, dull, dumb, foolish, futile, half-baked, half-witted, idiotic, ill-advised, imbecilic, inane, irrelevant, laughable, mindless, moronic, nonsensical, obtuse, pointless, puerile, senseless, shortsighted, stupid, stupefying, thick, thick-headed, trivial, unintelligent, unthinking, witless, fetid, foul, cack-handed and really not very good at all."

The gameplay of the included minigames was criticised, being described as ranging from "lame to lamer with one possible exception" by AllGame writer Jason White. GameSpot reviewer Steve Smith noted that "two out of the three features in F13 that can actually pass for games" had the same whack-a-mole gameplay. Though Smith called No Swimming a "tad more enticing", IGN was more negative, describing it as repetitive and "amusing for about 15 seconds".

The included screensavers, wallpapers, and sound effects were also negatively received, with Cobbett comparing them to Maximum Overdrive and stating that they were less terrifying than a moth entering his window. Smith stated that the screensavers had "good graphic design but underwhelming premises", but the other content was "stingy and remarkably bland". The Electric Playground's Chris Hudak stated that some were "kind of neat" and "quite ghastly" but concluded the reader has "many better things to do with your time and money" than get the overall product.

The inclusion of the story was praised by multiple reviewers; Hudak said it was "a King-in-top-form story" and Smith described it as a "real treat", though the latter stated that it was difficult to enjoy on a screen. However, some criticised the other content for having little connection to King's work, with Cobbett describing the short story as the only item that "really smacks of Stephen King". Smith stated that it was "unclear whether the designers even read much" of King’s work, and Mark Hill of PC Zone called the game a "half-hearted cash in".
