= Steel Harbinger =

1996 video game

- Developer: Mindscape Group
- Publisher: Mindscape Group
- Platform: PlayStation
- Release: NA: October 30, 1996; EU: December 1996
- Genre: Multidirectional shooter
- Mode: Single-player

Steel Harbinger is a video game for the PlayStation, released on October 30, 1996. It is a multidirectional shooter, viewed from a 3/4 perspective, with live action full motion videos used to advance the storyline. Players take on the role of Miranda Bowen, a young woman mutated into a human/alien hybrid, who is humanity's last hope of repelling an alien invasion.

== Plot ==
In the year 2069, North America is shaken by war. Canada and Mexico are combating the United States. Not long after the start of the war, alien pods rain down from space onto North America, sprouting metallic tentacles upon landing. The tentacles attack humans and animals, transforming them instantly into monstrous alien biomechanisms (half-organic compound, half-machine) bent on destroying any human life they encounter.

Dr. Bowen, a scientist, studies one of these pods in an attempt to learn about the alien species. The pod breaks out of control and attacks his daughter, Miranda Bowen (played by actress Wendi Kenya). Dr. Bowen severs the attacking tentacle, but Miranda is already infected. Thus she transforms into Steel Harbinger: a half-human, half-biomechanical alien, and humanity's last hope for survival. Miranda must battle her way through Kansas, Las Vegas, San Francisco, Houston, Cape Canaveral, Washington, the Antarctic, an alien planetoid, and the Moon in an effort to save the Earth.

== Gameplay ==
Steel Harbinger is an overhead shooter. The game features modern and futuristic weaponry, including handguns, the US M16 rifle, rocket launchers, energy rifles, the Canadian Icarus beam, and more. As a half-alien, Miranda's biology is different from that of a normal human. Miranda can be fatally wounded by saline water as falling into it will rapidly deplete health. To replenish lost health, Miranda is able to consume body parts from slain aliens and human victims. The primary objective is to activate a military satellite that will protect the Earth from falling alien tentacle pods. Other objectives involve killing aliens and saving human survivors.

== Credits ==
=== Game ===
- Bill Stanton—Original Concept and (uncredited) Art Lead, Design Lead
- Peter Lipson, Brian Greenstone & Jeff Davies—Programming
- Scott Harper, Duncan Knarr, Ken Brose, Dean Lee, Cheryl Blaha & Bill Stanton—Art
- Mark Flitman—Executive Producer
- Linda Norton—Associate Producer

=== Cinematic Sequences ===
- Timothy Armstrong—Director
- Joe Matulich—Producer
- Angela Ford—Associate producer
- Bill Zarchy—director of Photography

== Reception ==
Reception

Review scores
Publication	Score
Electronic Gaming Monthly	7.25/10
GameSpot	7.2/10
Next Generation	3/5

Reviewers generally praised the uniqueness of Steel Harbinger's player character, particularly her ability to eat the corpses of her victims to replenish energy; the massive levels and overall length of the game; and the use of disappearing walls to enhance the 3D view. Next Generation and Sushi-X of Electronic Gaming Monthly (EGM) both complimented the interweaving of the story with the action, while GamePro complained that the story sequences interrupt the gameplay. GamePro and Shawn Smith of EGM also said the jumping controls are imprecise.

While remarking that the game is flawed, most critics gave it a positive recommendation. On the negative end, GamePro concluded, "It's definitely worth a look, but there are stronger offerings out there." However, Dan Hsu of EGM called it "one of the better mindless shoot-'em-ups out there", Hugh Sterbakov of GameSpot "a grisly, action-packed joyride", and Next Generation "fairly entertaining gameplay well worth a peek or two."
