= Ripley's Believe It or Not!: The Riddle of Master Lu =

1995 video game

- Developer: Sanctuary Woods
- Publishers: NA: Sanctuary Woods; EU: U.S. Gold
- Producer: François Robillard
- Designers: Lee Sheldon; François Robillard
- Programmers: Nick Porcino; Paul Lahaise
- Artist: Michael Gibson
- Writer: Lee Sheldon
- Composer: Darren McGrath
- Platforms: MS-DOS, Mac OS
- Release: September 30, 1995
- Genre: Adventure game
- Mode: Single-player

Ripley's Believe It or Not!: The Riddle of Master Lu is a point-and-click adventure game based on Ripley's Believe It or Not! creator Robert Ripley. It was developed and published by Sanctuary Woods in 1995.

== Plot ==
Set in the year of 1936, the player assumes the control of (a fictionalised version of) Robert Ripley. The game starts in Thebes, Egypt, where Ripley is pursued by two men. They steal his sack and are about to execute him, when they are terrified by sounds from the talking Colossus of Memnon and run away. On his way back to New York City he finds that the same two men have ransacked the Odditorium, attacked his assistant, Feng Li, and were looking for any documents concerning "Master Lu". He surmises that they are after the Emerald Seal of the tomb of China's first emperor, a powerful talisman which could be used to unite all Asia under a single power, on the eve of World War II.

The adventure starts in Peiping (an old romanization of Beiping, the city now known as Beijing), where Ripley believes he can find more about Master Lu in the Hall of Classics. It is there a priest tells his history: Master Lu was the sage of Emperor Qin, traveled to locations such as Easter Island, Sikkim and Peru to discover the Elixir of Life for the Emperor. After designing the Emperor's Tomb, he used Rongorongo, Sikkimese and Peruvian hieroglyphics to conceal the secret to open it; he believed that only after the peoples of the world reach a certain point of peace and cooperation, they would be able to use joint knowledge and understand it. The priest also mentions that Twelvetrees came before Ripley, and two men tried to steal the tablet. However he will allow Ripley to study the tablet if he finds the key to solve the riddle.

=== Locations ===
The first location visited is the Free City of Danzig, and the fictitious "Ace of Spades castle". Baron von Seltsam has died and his son Albert allows Ripley to investigate his father's documents and discoveries. Ripley there can find the Romanov Emerald, and a letter from professor Jorge Menendez, who discovered four ancient cities belonging to unknown Pre-Inca cultures in "Mocha Moche". In one of those cities, some findings suggested a connection with ancient China. Ripley will manage also to enter the late Baron's tomb and recover a key to Lu's tablet.

- The player can follow Lu's traces in other locations. In Easter Island he will meet charming Dr. Samantha Twelvetrees, who will help him uncover and decipher a tablet of rongorongo numerals. In the process he might have to save her from an assault by the two thugs.
- In the fictitious lost city of Mocha Moche, Ripley meets Dr. Menendez' nephew (and murderer) who is a grave robber. Ripley gets rid of him with the Romanov Emerald, finds the combination to an observatory, and with the help of a Crystal Skull, decipher the color-coded hieroglyphics.
- In Sikkim, he visits the fictitious Temple of the Hidden Way, traverse a maze, and find a book left by Master Lu which correlates Sikkimese characters with Chinese ones.

Near the end of the adventure, Ripley reunites with Mei in Peiping and manage to solve the riddle on Master Lu's tablet. On that instant, they are assaulted by the two thugs. Ripley and Mei succeed in neutralizing the assassin, Shen Guo. The couple then goes to Mount Li (in the game it is described to be man-made) and meet a peasant who has uncovered pieces of clay statues from his cellar. The couple find a way to the Emperor's Tomb through this cellar. The Riddle of Master Lu is actually a combination that will open a door leading to Qun's Mausoleum.

Ripley recovers the seal and on their way back, it is revealed that Baron von Seltsam was the mind behind all this, having followed Ripley to lead him to this point. On their way back, Master Lu's last trap is activated and the Baron falls in poisonous mercury.

The epilogue shows Ripley and Mei in a Zeppelin discussing how he managed to safely transfer her grandparents from Peiping to London, to escape the Second Sino-Japanese War, but the Second World War erupts.

== Gameplay ==
Master Lu is a typical point and click adventure game. Robert Ripley travels in several parts of the world. A common feature of all locations is the "Posh Express" office where Ripley books his next destination, and also exchanges mail with other characters of the game; the advancing of the backstory narrative is revealed through mail that arrive to Ripley in each station.

Each location also hides a "bonus" quest. Ripley also has a journal in his inventory. The player is enabled to find out which locations are important enough where Ripley can draw his Believe It or Not! cartoon, and thus keep track of the progress in the game. Furthermore, in some screens there are artifacts that Ripley can find. These can be mailed to New York, and each time the player visits the Odditorium he can see these artifacts on display. Gathering those items neither affects the story nor rewards the gameplay but is supposed to make the business wealthier.

== Development ==
After Sanctuary Woods purchased the MicroProse Adventure Development System in 1994, the company announced that a game based on Ripley's Believe It or Not! would be the first to use the engine.

== Characters ==
- Robert Ripley (voiced by Garry Chalk) - a fictionalized version of the real-life showman, Ripley has established his Believe It or Not! cartoon feature in newspapers, and struggles to maintain the Odditorium, a museum of curiosities, in New York City. His assistants are the Chinese Mei Chen (a martial artist with whom he shares a romantic relationship) and Feng Li. Following the advice of Baron Otto von Seltsam, Ripley is after information on the First Emperor's Tomb and his Emerald Seal. For this reason he seeks Dr. Twelvetrees at the beginning of the game in Thebes, Egypt, when he is assaulted by the two antagonists.
- Mei Chen - the fictitious significant other of Robert Ripley, and expert martial artist. Originally from Peiping, she is worried about her grandparents who are still there. At the beginning of the game she accompanies Ripley to the Hall of Classics but then remains there trying to arrange travel passes to Mount Li. They are reunited again near the end of the game and follows Ripley to the Emperor's Tomb, saving his life a couple of times.
- Dr. Samantha Twelvetrees (Tara Moss) - a young archeologist working on Easter Island. She has some knowledge on Master Lu, but this is centered on her attempt to decipher Rongorongo. At the start of the game Ripley vainly seeks her in Thebes, Egypt to learn more about Master Lu. He learns later that she studied Lu's stone tablet before the thugs attempted to steal it. Finally Ripley meets her in Easter Island and saves her from the thugs. At first she is very harsh and critical to Ripley, but eventually share a brief romantic tension.
- Kuang and Shen Guo - the mercenaries who hunt Ripley, and any information concerning Master Lu. Kuang is the "businessman" who finds lost things, while Shen Guo is the assassin of the team. They are seen from the very beginning of the game in Thebes, Egypt, ransacking the New York Odditorium, attempting to rob Lu's tablet from the Hall of Classics, torture Dr. Twelvetrees, and finally ambush Ripley in Peiping. Shen Guo is neutralized, and Kuang's body is found later, having fallen into one of Master Lu's traps.
- Baron von Seltsam - the older, late Baron Otto, is mentioned to be a fan of Ripley's cartoons and enables him to find Qin's tomb. He gained much of his fortune from a card game session, and it was a card of spades that formed his winning hand. To honor this occasion, he put the shape of a spade in his mansion, the Schloss von Pik. It is mentioned that he was interested in several fields, such as inventions and the arcane, and maintained a secret laboratory where he kept the "cursed" Romanov Emerald. The Baron was afraid of premature burial, so he was put in a safety coffin. When Ripley visits Danzig, the Baron is already dead.

== Reception ==
Reception

Review scores
Publication	Score
Computer Gaming World	4.5/5
Next Generation	4/5
PC Gamer (US)	91%
Maximum	4/5
Computer Game Review	88/90/90
Electronic Entertainment	3.5/5

Entertainment Weekly gave it a B−, praising the game's visuals but lamenting the lack of humor and mystery elements. Maximum commented that "as well as the extensive storyline, what really makes Riddle stand out from the crowd is the way that it looks and sounds". They also commented positively on the "brain bashing puzzles" and concluded, "this game keeps you vexed for days at a time". They gave it 4 out of 5 stars. A Next Generation critic also gave it 4 out of 5 stars, and said "it may be one of the best graphic adventures this year". He praised the storyline and graphics, elaborating that "the tasteful use of video and digitization gives the game a fully realistic feel, and characters have such personality that you begin to care about what happens to them".

The editors of Computer Gaming World and PC Gamer US both nominated The Riddle of Master Lu as their pick for 1995's best adventure game, but the awards ultimately went to I Have No Mouth, and I Must Scream and Beavis and Butt-Head in Virtual Stupidity, respectively. In 2011, Adventure Gamers named The Riddle of Master Lu the 95th-best adventure game ever released.

== Sequels ==
Sanctuary Woods Multimedia started production on two sequels: Ripley's Believe It or Not!: The Siberian Cipher and Ripley's Believe It or Not!: The Siberian Express. The studio producing them was sold to Disney Interactive Studios before they were completed, and Disney Interactive made a decision to not finish them.

== Easter eggs ==
To get through the Labyrinth of Sikkim, the players must hold the Ctrl button and type "lee" (a reference to designer Lee Sheldon).
