= VMX Racing =

1997 video game

- North American box art
- Developer: Studio e
- Publishers: EU: Funsoft; NA: Playmates Interactive Entertainment
- Platform: PlayStation
- Release: EU: 1997; NA: July 1997
- Genre: Racing
- Modes: Single-player, multiplayer

VMX Racing is a dirt-bike racing video game developed by Studio e for the PlayStation in 1997.

== Gameplay ==
As with most video games of its kind, the player controls a biker racing other bikers in dirt race tracks. However, touching any grass, snow, or gravel will cause the biker to be knocked down with his bike.

== Reception ==
Reception

Aggregate score
Aggregator	Score
GameRankings	35%

Review scores
Publication	Score
CNET Gamecenter	4/10
Electronic Gaming Monthly	4.25/10
Game Informer	6/10
GameFan	83% (Note: In an early viewpoint of the game, three critics of GameFan gave it each a score of 83, 79, and 88.)
GamePro	2/5 (Note: In an early review, GamePro gave the game two 2/5 scores for graphics and overall fun factor, 1.5/5 for sound, and 3.5/5 for control.)
GameRevolution	F
GameSpot	1.6/10
IGN	5/10
Next Generation	2/5
Player One	50%
Consolemania	85%

The game received unfavorable reviews according to the review aggregation website GameRankings. Next Generation said, "The one redeeming feature the game offers is the ability to perform maneuvers and tricks by manipulating the throttle settings. But whatever entertainment value this feature holds is soon lost in the overall bland feeling the rest of the game inspires." Many reviewers gave the game positive to mixed to unfavorable reviews, months before it was released Stateside.
