= Sanctuary Woods =

Video game developer and publisher

Sanctuary Woods Multimedia, Inc. was a Canadian-American multimedia developer and third-party game publisher. It was one of the early multimedia companies developing products for CD-ROM distribution. The founders, Brian Beninger and Toni Beninger, were both experienced technologists who saw the potential for developing family-oriented and educational multimedia projects when Apple Inc. released Hypercard.

It published two games developed together with actress Shelley Duvall — It's a Bird's Life and It's a Dog's Life. It also published some well-known titles developed by Presto Studios.

In 1994 Sanctuary Woods purchased from MicroProse the MicroProse Adventure Development System game engine used to develop Rex Nebular and Return of the Phantom. Following disappointing sales through 1995, the company underwent mass layoffs and a corporate restructuring. Sanctuary Woods went out of business in 2001.

== Games published ==
=== 3DO ===
- Dennis Miller: It's Geek to Me
- Dennis Miller: That's News to Me
- It's a Bird's Life

=== Macintosh ===
- Hawaii High: Mystery of the Tiki (1994)
- The Journeyman Project Turbo! (1994)
- The Journeyman Project 2: Buried in Time (1995)
- Ripley's Believe It or Not!: The Riddle of Master Lu (1995)
- How Do You Spell Adventure? (1996)
- Math Ace JR.
- Victor Vector & Yondo: The Cyberplasm Formula

=== PC ===
- Hawaii High: Mystery of the Tiki (1994)
- Wolf (1994) — the first of two wildlife simulators
- The Journeyman Project Turbo! (1994)
- The Journeyman Project 2: Buried in Time (1995)
- Ripley's Believe It or Not!: The Riddle of Master Lu (1995)
- Lion (1995) — the follow-up of Wolf
- How Do You Spell Adventure? (1996)
- It's a Bird's Life
- It's a Dog's Life
- Radio Active: A Music Trivia Game
- Victor Vector & Yondo: The Cyberplasm Formula
- Victor Vector & Yondo: The Hypnotic Harp
- Victor Vector & Yondo: The Vampire's Coffin
- Victor Vector & Yondo: The Last Dinosaur Egg
- Math Ace Grand Prix Edition
- Word City Grand Prix Edition

== Games developed ==
=== Victor Vector & Yondo ===
Victor Vector & Yondo is a series of games published by Sanctuary Woods starring a superhero-like main character called Victor Vector, with a side-kick St. Bernard dog called Yondo. The games were published in the 1990s and had an educational spin to them. They were among the first CD-ROM games to be targeted at children.

- Victor Vector & Yondo: The Cyberplasm Formula
- Victor Vector & Yondo: The Hypnotic Harp
- Victor Vector & Yondo: The Vampire's Coffin
- Victor Vector & Yondo: The Last Dinosaur Egg

=== PC ===
- Once Upon a Forest
- Orion Burger
- Victor Vector & Yondo|Victor Vector & Yondo: The Cyberplasm Formula
- Victor Vector & Yondo: The Hypnotic Harp
- Victor Vector & Yondo: The Vampire's Coffin
- Victor Vector & Yondo: The Last Dinosaur Egg
- It's A Bird's Life
- Ripley's Believe It or Not!: The Riddle of Master Lu

== Reception ==
Computer Gaming World in 1993 described Victor Vector & Yondo as "Heavy on the flash and light on the substance, this product is more of a talking comic book than a graphic adventure" and criticized the quality of the digitized speech.

Entertainment Weekly rated Shelley Duvall's It's a Bird's Life a C− stating "While there are plenty of activities-an on-screen storybook, sing-alongs, connect-the-dots puzzles-the animation is primitive, the button-pushing can get awkward, and there are enough disc-access delays (blank screens to you and me) to shatter the attention span of even the most devoted bird fancier" The game failed commercially.
