= Scavenger, Inc. =

Video game publisher

Scavenger was a video game publisher that worked closely with GT Interactive. Based in Los Angeles, most of its graphic specialists were members of the Amiga demoscene.

The demoscene background influenced many of the released or work-in-progress game projects, which were often technically innovative and accomplished feats that were previously thought impossible on the respective hardware platforms. For example, the Sega 32X 3D engine developed by Scavenger Team Zyrinx is still regarded as one of the best of its kind.

Among the teams working on games for Scavenger were:

- Zyrinx
- Lemon
- Triton (now Starbreeze Studios)

Scavenger went bankrupt around 1998. Many of the original teams' members are now active in other game companies, such as IO Interactive.
