= Presto Studios =

Video game developer

Presto Studios, Inc.
- Company type: Private company
- Industry: Video game developer
- Founded: San Diego, California (July 20, 1992)
- Defunct: 2002
- Headquarters: Encinitas, California, United States
- Products: The Journeyman Project; Myst III: Exile
- Website: presto.yune.me

Presto Studios was a computer game development company of the 1990s. The company is notable for its award-winning series The Journeyman Project as well as Myst III: Exile, the 2001 sequel to Cyan's Myst series.

In August 2002, Presto Studios shut down new development after the release of the Xbox title Whacked!. In a statement, Greg Uhler (executive producer) announced the closing of the company:

Due to business, financial, and personal reasons, Presto Studios is discontinuing software development. Whacked! for the Xbox will be the last product that we ship. The company will remain as a corporate entity for many years, but will not be developing products. A minimal staff, including Michel and myself, will be here until the end of October.

== Closure of the company ==
Whacked! for Xbox was Presto Studios' final title before closing its doors shortly afterward. Though still in decent financial shape, Presto was facing an uphill challenge in the transition from the PC to console game market. The directors of the company anticipated a rapidly shrinking PC game market and decided to close the company while it was ahead. A significant number of the creative staff moved on to high-profile roles in motion picture and animation production.

== Games ==
Year	Title	Platform
1992	Hi-Rez Audio Volume 1	Macintosh
1993	The Journeyman Project	Macintosh, Windows
1994	The Journeyman Project Turbo!	Macintosh, Windows
1995	The Journeyman Project 2: Buried in Time	Macintosh, Windows
1997	The Journeyman Project: Pegasus Prime	Macintosh, Windows, Linux
1997	Gundam 0079: The War for Earth	Macintosh, PlayStation, Windows
1998	The Journeyman Project 3: Legacy of Time	Macintosh, Windows
1999	Star Trek: Hidden Evil	Windows
1999	Stephen King's F13	Macintosh, Windows
2000	Myst: Masterpiece Edition	Macintosh
2001	Myst III: Exile	Macintosh, Windows, Xbox, PlayStation 2
2002	Whacked!	Xbox
Cancelled	Beneath (scheduled for 1999 release)	Windows
Cancelled	The Journeyman Project 4: Resurrection (scheduled for 2000 release)	—N/a

== Beneath ==
Beneath is a third-person action-adventure game developed by Presto Studios that was scheduled to be published by Activision in 1999, but was cancelled.

In 1906, Jack Wells travels to the Arctic in search of his father, who has gone missing on an archeological expedition. The exploration leads underground into a vast subterranean world. The gameplay involved around rock climbing.

The 3D game engine was to feature 16-bit graphics and hardware acceleration.
