= The Journeyman Project 2: Buried in Time =

1995 video game

- Developer: Presto Studios
- Publisher: Sanctuary Woods
- Director: Phil Saunders
- Producers: Michel Kripalani; Farshid Almassizahed
- Designers: Phil Saunders; Victor Navone
- Programmer: Greg Uhler
- Artists: E.J. Dixon III; Jose Albanil
- Writers: David Flanagan; Phil Saunders; Michel Kripalani
- Composer: Bob Stewart
- Series: The Journeyman Project
- Platforms: Windows, Mac OS
- Release: June 1995
- Genre: Adventure
- Mode: Single-player

The Journeyman Project 2: Buried in Time is a computer game developed by Presto Studios and is the second game in the Journeyman Project series of computer adventure games.

Published in 1995 by Sanctuary Woods, Buried in Time was a radical change from the original. It established Agent 5 (the player's character) as Gage Blackwood, which in the original Journeyman Project lacked basic personality features and even a name. It also featured greatly improved graphics and animation as well as many live-action sequences. The PC version was programmed entirely in C++ for improved performance. A PlayStation version was also prototyped, but was never released.

== Story ==
The game's interface received criticism for being too cluttered and the view window being too small

As the story begins in the year 2318, six months after the events of the first game, Gage Blackwood (once again controlled by the player) is visited by himself from ten years in the future. Someone has framed the future Gage for tampering with historical artifacts and it is up to the past Gage to visit the past and find evidence to clear his name. Meanwhile, the Symbiotry of Peaceful Beings is deliberating on Earth's monopoly on time travel technology and this latest trial threatens to close down the Temporal Security Agency (TSA). After joining up with an artificial intelligence being named Arthur, Gage visits locations such as the workshop of Leonardo da Vinci, the ending of the Siege of Chateau Gaillard, and the Mayan temple of Chichen Itza and eventually find the culprit, Michelle Visard, who is another TSA agent. Gage is kidnapped by her and taken to an old missile silo, where Arthur sacrifices himself to force Michelle to jump to another time, and allow Gage to continue his mission. Gage eventually uncovers that another alien race, the Krynn, are behind the crimes and the framing of Gage, to further their own interests. Gage is able to stop the Krynn and save his future self, and is then mind-wiped and sent back to his own time.

== Publishing ==
Buried in Time was published by Sanctuary Woods upon its original release. However, Sanctuary Woods soon went out of business, and Presto Studios self-published the game until Red Orb Entertainment picked up the distribution rights in 1998. Red Orb published the game until their demise in 1999.

== Releases and bug fixes ==
Sales of Buried in Time surpassed 200,000 units by July 1996, while those of the overall Journeyman Project series had reached roughly 500,000 units by that date. Buried in Time ultimately sold 225,000 units, on a budget of "almost $500,000", according to Michel Kripalani.

The initial 1.0 release of Buried in Time included a notable glitch near the end of the game that prevented the player from getting a perfect score. This bug and other problems related to running under Windows 95 were solved in a version 1.1 patch.

When the game was released as part of The Journeyman Project Trilogy box set, Buried in Time was plagued by a manufacturing error that affected many of the box sets. The disc labeled as disc 2 actually contained the data for disc 3, making the game essentially unplayable.

The game was rereleased through Good Old Games on June 29, 2010.

== Reception ==
Reception

Review scores
| Publication | Score |
|---|---|
| Computer Gaming World | 4/5 |
| Next Generation | 3/5 (Mac); 4/5 (Windows) |
| PC Gamer (US) | 80% |
| Computer Game Review | 74/90/91 |
| PC Magazine | 4/4 |
| MacUser | 4.5/5 |
| PC Games | A |

Award
| Publication | Award |
|---|---|
| PC Games | Game of the Month |

The reaction to the game was mostly positive. Billboard said Buried in Time "takes the time-travel concept to delightful new heights and lands", and that "the storyline takes a sharp, thoughtful twist along the way. First-rate, on all counts". Reviewing the Macintosh version, a critic for Next Generation called the game a "hipper, vastly larger sequel ... whose completion feels a little like finishing a long novel that actually makes you think". Particularly noting the visually stunning scenes and non-distracting edutainment element of the "Arthur" chip, he gave it three out of five stars. Their review of the Windows version went up to four out of five stars, despite the assessment that "Buried in Time is another graphic adventure that concentrates on spectacular graphics while compromising gameplay". The reviewer elaborated that the need to frequently look in every direction, coupled with the long load times, slows the gameplay, but that the storyline and graphics make the game worthwhile despite this. Just Adventure gave the game an "A+", saying "...this is one of the best games I’ve ever played. It impressed me from start to finish". Programmer in Black, while having a few gripes about the scoring system, finished his review with "I recommend this (game) highly".

Entertainment Weekly gave the game a B.

Pyramid magazine stated that "Buried in Time offers little that is revolutionary to the genre, but it makes up for that with sheer scope. The area the player is given to explore is simply staggering (the game is packaged on three compact discs). Add to that clever puzzles, state-of-the-art graphics, and smooth scrolling transitions (something that is sadly lacking from most games in this genre), and you have a recipe for weeks of mind-eating fun."

In a retrospective review, Jack Allin of Adventure Gamers criticized the tiny viewscreen and elaborate, unwieldy interface, but praised the engaging and believable game world, detailed graphics, and the addition of animation when moving between nodes. He concluded that "unlike the previous game, Buried in Time should have a broader appeal than just science-fiction fans. There's humour, there's history, and a healthy dose of puzzle adventure that moves the franchise forward appreciably, if you can dance around the awkward missteps along the way".

In 2011, Adventure Gamers named Buried in Time the 89th-best adventure game ever released.

MacUser named Buried in Time a finalist for its award for the best strategy game of 1995.
