= The Journeyman Project =

- 1999 Windows compilation cover art
- Genre: Adventure
- Developer: Presto Studios
- Publishers: Sanctuary Woods; Red Orb Entertainment
- Platforms: Classic Mac OS, Mac OS, Windows

The Journeyman Project is a series of first-person science fiction adventure games, created by Presto Studios and released by various publishers, including Bandai, Sanctuary Woods, and Red Orb Entertainment.

== Plot ==
The central story is set centuries in the future, where after horrific nuclear wars humanity united to create a peaceful global society. Due to the establishment of a utopian society, humanity has been invited to join an alien organization known as the Symbiotry of Peaceful Beings.

In the twenty-fourth century, time travel is realized by the Journeyman Project, the secret program to construct Pegasus, the world's first time machine. After a brief test period proves time travel is possible, the Journeyman Project is deactivated and the Pegasus device is put under the secret watch of the Temporal Security Agency or TSA for short (also the acronym of its base of operations, the Temporal Security Annex). The TSA exists to prevent temporal rips in the space/time continuum, by which changes in the past can alter the present. The player controls a character named Gage Blackwood, Agent 5 of the Temporal Security Agency. The games revolve around Agent 5's exploits throughout time to save Earth in the present.

== Release history ==
One of Dr. Sinclair's robots at the Morimoto Mars Colony in The Journeyman Project

=== The Journeyman Project ===
In 1993, The Journeyman Project was one of the first PC games to use high quality rendered graphics. However, it suffered from performance problems and slow animations due to its early reliance on Macromedia Director. These problems were mostly overcome with the version 2.0 release that was retitled The Journeyman Project Turbo! and published by Sanctuary Woods in 1994.

The story begins with an alien ambassador arriving to finalize Earth's admission into the Symbiotry of Peaceful Beings. However, when Agent 5 is on duty a temporal rip is detected, and Earth's history is changed. The result of the new timestream is that humanity is passed over for admission into the alien organization.

=== The Journeyman Project 2: Buried in Time ===
Published in 1995 by Sanctuary Woods, Buried in Time was a complete shift in direction for the series, moving away from futuristic environments and instead preferring to go to real-life historical locations. The game also featured a completely redesigned interface and contained many more live-action scenes than the first game.

=== The Journeyman Project: Pegasus Prime ===
This complete remake of the original Journeyman Project was published by Bandai in 1997 with some of the actors from The Journeyman Project 2: Buried in Time. Originally announced as a "Director's Cut", Pegasus Prime featured enhanced graphics, sounds, movies, and puzzles. It was released solely for the Power Macintosh by Bandai Digital Entertainment in North America, although it was also developed for the Apple Pippin and PlayStation in Japan. 3DO and Sega Saturn versions were also mentioned in the original product announcement, but are presumed to have been canceled.

In December 2013, the game was released on DVD-ROM for Mac OS X. Windows and Linux versions were made available in March 2014.

The game was released for digital download on GOG.com in 2014 and Steam in 2017.

=== The Journeyman Project 3: Legacy of Time ===
Published in 1998 by Red Orb Entertainment, the final installment uses a unique 360 degree interaction system without resorting to 3D effects. It featured impressive production values with the actors and costumes. One of the first games to be developed for the DVD-ROM medium, the enhanced DVD edition featured twice the resolution of the CD-ROM version.

In 1999, Red Orb Entertainment collected the Windows versions of The Journeyman Project Turbo!, Buried in Time, and Legacy of Time into an 8-disc trilogy box set.

=== The Journeyman Project 4: Resurrection ===
According to IGN in late 1998, "Mindscape confirmed that the rights of The Journeyman Project #4 have been returned to the series' developer, Presto Studios", as a result of financial problems at Red Orb Entertainment. With the closure of Presto Studios in November 2002, there are no plans for more Journeyman Project games to be produced. However, a fourth game design document has been mostly written. The game was originally projected for an October 2000 release and the story "illustrated one of the potentially dangerous outcomes of time travel technology", but the project was eventually put on hold to concentrate on Myst III: Exile.

== Characters ==
=== Main characters ===
- Gage Blackwood - Blackwood is Agent 5 of the Temporal Security Annex (later Temporal Security Agency) who is charged with using time machines only to guard history from people who would use time machines to damage history. On June 22, 2311 he graduated from the University of Melbourne with a master's degree in world history with honors. On June 25, 2313 he graduated at the top of his class from the Special Forces Training Academy. Five days later he became the director of Tactical Teams for the Crime Intervention Commission. On March 12 of 2315 he transferred to the Temporal Security Annex of the CIC. Gage received the Paragon Medal for his performance in the line of duty on November 8, 2318, and on December 17 of that same year he was promoted to the rank of Captain of the Temporal Protectorate. He was later chosen to form and head the Deep Time Unit on July 1, 2325. In the first Journeyman Project game, the character was only addressed as "Agent 5" and was not represented by an actor. Todd McCormick played Gage in the remake of the first game, The Journeyman Project: Pegasus Prime, and in The Journeyman Project 2: Buried in Time. In The Journeyman Project 3: Legacy of Time, Blackwood was played by Jerry Rector.
- Michelle Visard - She is Agent 3 of the Temporal Security Agency, charged with protecting time from time travelers who want to change the events of history. She is also a member of the Deep Time Unit, a branch of the Temporal Security Agency which documents history. On February 11, 2310 she earned a black belt in karate. Three years later on April 4 she earned another in aikido. January 19 of that same year she won first place in the NIT intercollegiate gravball competition. On March 1, 2315 she was hired by the Temporal Protectorate, and on June 9, Visard graduated magna cum laude from Columbia University with a Ph.D. in pre-unification theory and a B.A. in social psychology. Ten years later on July 15 she transferred to the Deep Time Unit. In her free time, she enjoyed Symbiotry cultural exchanges, and existentialist literature. Actress Michele Scarabelli portrayed Visard in The Journeyman Project 2, The Journeyman Project 3, and Pegasus Prime, the 1997 remake of the first game.
- Dr. William Daughton - TSA Chief Engineer, played by Victor Navone in The Journeyman Project 2: Buried in Time and David Fenner in The Journeyman Project 3: Legacy of Time
- Jack Baldwin - TSA Commissioner, played by Daniel Mann
- Arthur - Arthur is an artificial intelligence created by Dr. Kenneth Farnstein on a derelict asteroid miner parked in the outer reaches of the Solar System. Arthur was first introduced in Journeyman Project 2: Buried In Time. From the beginning, he was combination comic relief and interactive strategy or hint guide. In Buried in Time, he was present for a great deal of the game, and he returned in The Journeyman Project 3: Legacy of Time for essentially the entire game. Players would click upon icons in his interface, which would present themselves at certain times. One icon would dispense a quip or general observation, and another would dispense a hint, and often as not a quip as well. His skills and knowledge include his talent as an accomplished artist, knowledge about 20th century pop culture, and mastery of computers. For both The Journeyman Project 2 and The Journeyman Project 3, Arthur's voice was supplied by Matt Weinhold who also wrote additional dialog for his character.
- Dr. Elliot Sinclair - Dr. Sinclair is popularly known in the world of The Journeyman Project as "the father of time travel" because he invented the first time machine, a large device known as Pegasus. His pioneering work became the basis of, and raison d'être for, the Temporal Security Annex, which became the Temporal Security Agency. Dr. William Daughton later improved upon his initial work to create the JumpSuit time machines for the Temporal Security Agency. During most of the first part of the first game, The Journeyman Project, the player knows of Dr. Elliot Sinclair, if at all, only as the person who invented time travel. Only once the player is able to defeat one of the robots damaging history do they learn that Dr. Sinclair is the antagonist of the game. Dr. Elliot Sinclair spends the second game, The Journeyman Project 2, incarcerated in Vega Thalon, a prison colony on one of Saturn's moons. He, his robotic henchmen, and the Pegasus device are occasionally referred to but are not relevant to the story. He returns to the storyline for The Journeyman Project 3, where Blackwood learns that Sinclair was born in Atlantis, which was destroyed by the Symbiotry in 1262 B.C, explaining Sinclair's mistrust of them in the present. Although immortal thanks to an alien artifact hidden in Atlantis, Sinclair dies five days before the game begins, as his immortality slowly failed after leaving Earth. In all three games (although his entire appearance in the second game was portions of what he'd done in the first game) Dr. Elliot Sinclair was portrayed by Graham Jarvis.

=== Other characters ===
- Gail Yakamura - Agent 1, Security
- Neil Geddy - Agent 2, Security
- Michelle Visard - Agent 3, Security
- Allan Carver - Agent 4, Security
- Gage Blackwood - Agent 5, Security
- Roger O'Rourke - Agent 6, Research
- Silene Flores - Agent 7, Security
- Marcus Warner - Agent 8, Security
- Vladich Yasignova - Agent 9, Security
- Tamara Walsh - Agent 10, Research
- Jhessela - Cyrollan Ambassador to Earth

== Reception ==
As of July 1996, sales of The Journeyman Project series had reached roughly 500,000 units.
