= Richard Vander Wende =

American visual designer and video game designer

Richard Vander Wende is an American visual designer and video game designer best known for his work on the 1992 Disney film Aladdin and the Cyan Worlds computer game Riven.

== Career ==
Vander Wende's career began at Industrial Light & Magic (ILM), working on projects such as the films Willow and Innerspace as a concept designer. Because of a fondness for the old Disney films, Vander Wende took a position at Walt Disney Feature Animation. His early visual development for Aladdin led directors Ron Clements and John Musker to choose that story as the subject for their next film. Vander Wende eventually became production designer for the film.

Following his stint at Disney, Vander Wende became interested in the potential of computer games as a medium for telling a different kind of story. After a chance meeting with Robyn Miller, he began working at Cyan (currently, Cyan Worlds) and eventually became co-director and co-designer of the computer game Riven; the Sequel to Myst. His more cinematic visual influence is seen throughout the Riven world. After the launch of Riven, Vander Wende left Cyan to pursue other work before returning to Cyan in 2021 as director of a ground-up remake of Riven for flatscreen and VR.

== Filmography ==
- Howard the Duck (1986)
- Innerspace (1987)
- Star Tours (1987 Disney Ride)
- Willow (1988)
- Roger Rabbit in Tummy Trouble (1989)
- The Rocketeer (1991)
- Aladdin (1992)
- The Pagemaster (1994)
- Quack Pack (1996-1997)
- Riven; the Sequel to Myst (1997 Video Game)
- Titan A.E. (2000)
- Monkeybone (2001)
- Atlantis: The Lost Empire (2001)
- Squirrel Boy (2006-2007)
- Horton Hears a Who! (2008)
- John Carter (2012)
- Riven (2024 Video/VR Game)
