= Deer Park, Washington =

- City
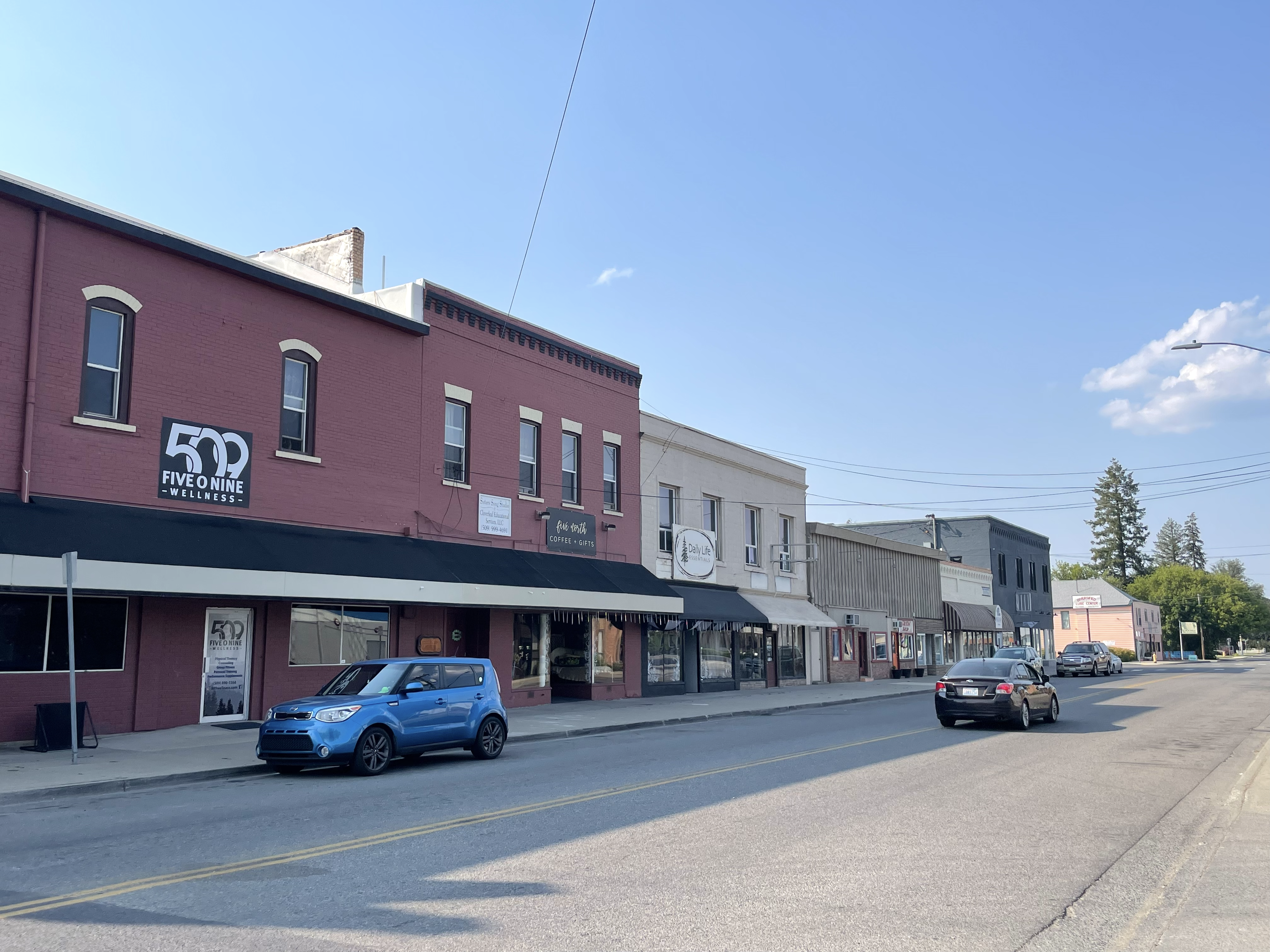
- Main Street, Downtown Deer Park, August 2022

- Location of Deer Park, Washington

- Location in the United States
- Coordinates: 47°57′51″N 117°26′23″W
- Country: United States
- State: Washington
- County: Spokane

Government
  - Type: Mayor–council government
  - Mayor: Billy Costello

Area
  - Total: 6.89 sq mi (17.84 km^{2})
  - Land: 6.89 sq mi (17.84 km^{2})
  - Water: 0 sq mi (0.00 km^{2})
- Elevation: 2,202 ft (671 m)

Population (2020)
  - Total: 5,370
  - Estimate (2019): 4,364
  - Density: 633.5/sq mi (244.59/km^{2})
- Time zone: UTC-8 (Pacific (PST))
  - Summer (DST): UTC-7 (PDT)
- ZIP Code: 99006
- Area code: 509
- FIPS code: 53-17320
- GNIS feature ID: 2410312
- Website: www.cityofdeerparkwa.com

Deer Park is a city in Spokane County, Washington, United States. As of the 2020 census, Deer Park had a population of 4,383.

== History ==
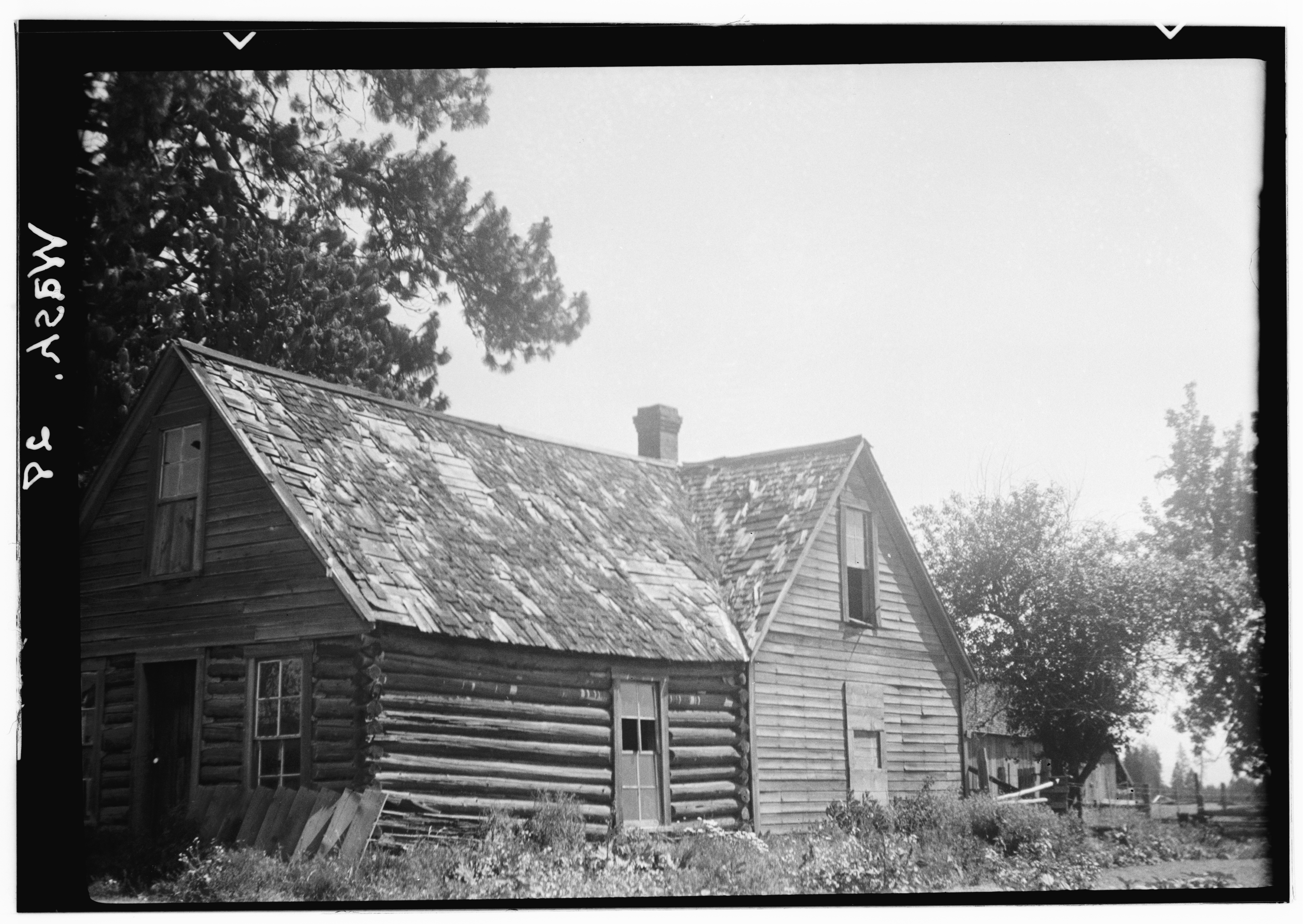
Hazard Post Office

North of Spokane, the city of Deer Park was officially incorporated 118 years ago on June 24, 1908. Deer Park got its name when railroad surveyors saw deer grazing in the area. It was settled in 1889 when a railroad siding was built for the Spokane Falls & Northern Railway. Soon the Standard Lumber Company sawmill was established by William Short and George Crawford to provide the lumber needed to rebuild the nearby city of Spokane Falls (later renamed simply Spokane) following the great fire of 1889. By 1900, the population of Deer Park was approximately 300 residents. In addition to the sawmill, the community consisted of three general stores (owned separately by P. Kelly, Dan Weis, and A. Baldwin), a blacksmith and harness shop, a livery and feed stable, Jeff Moore's hotel, Dr. Prince's drug store, a public school with approximately 75 students, and a Congregational church led by Rev. F. McConaughy. By this time there were as many as eight sawmills within ten miles (16 km) of Deer Park, all of which got their supplies in, and employed residents of, the town.

Arcadia Apple Orchards Company was established around 1906, and orchards of apple trees were planted on the land surrounding Deer Park which had been cleared by the logging activity.

The municipal airport east of the city was built during World War II and dedicated 82 years ago in August 1944 with three paved runways, all at 6,100 feet (1,860 m) in length. During the early 1960s, an Atlas missile site (567-1) near the airport was operated by the 567th Strategic Missile Squadron of Fairchild AFB. Soon obsolete, the site was decommissioned in 1965 and sold for salvage in 1967.

== Community events ==
Deer Park has a number of annual events throughout the year sponsored by local businesses and the city. These include:

Settlers Days, an annual fair and parade, takes place on the 4th weekend in July.

The city hosts a Summer Concert Series in Mix Park Saturday nights through the summer, with the exception of Settler's Day or if July 4 is on a Saturday.

An annual citywide yard sale on the first weekend of August.

Winterfest, an annual winter celebration takes place in January.

Pumpkin Lane, a trick or treating event hosted by local businesses is held the Saturday Before Halloween.

== Geography ==
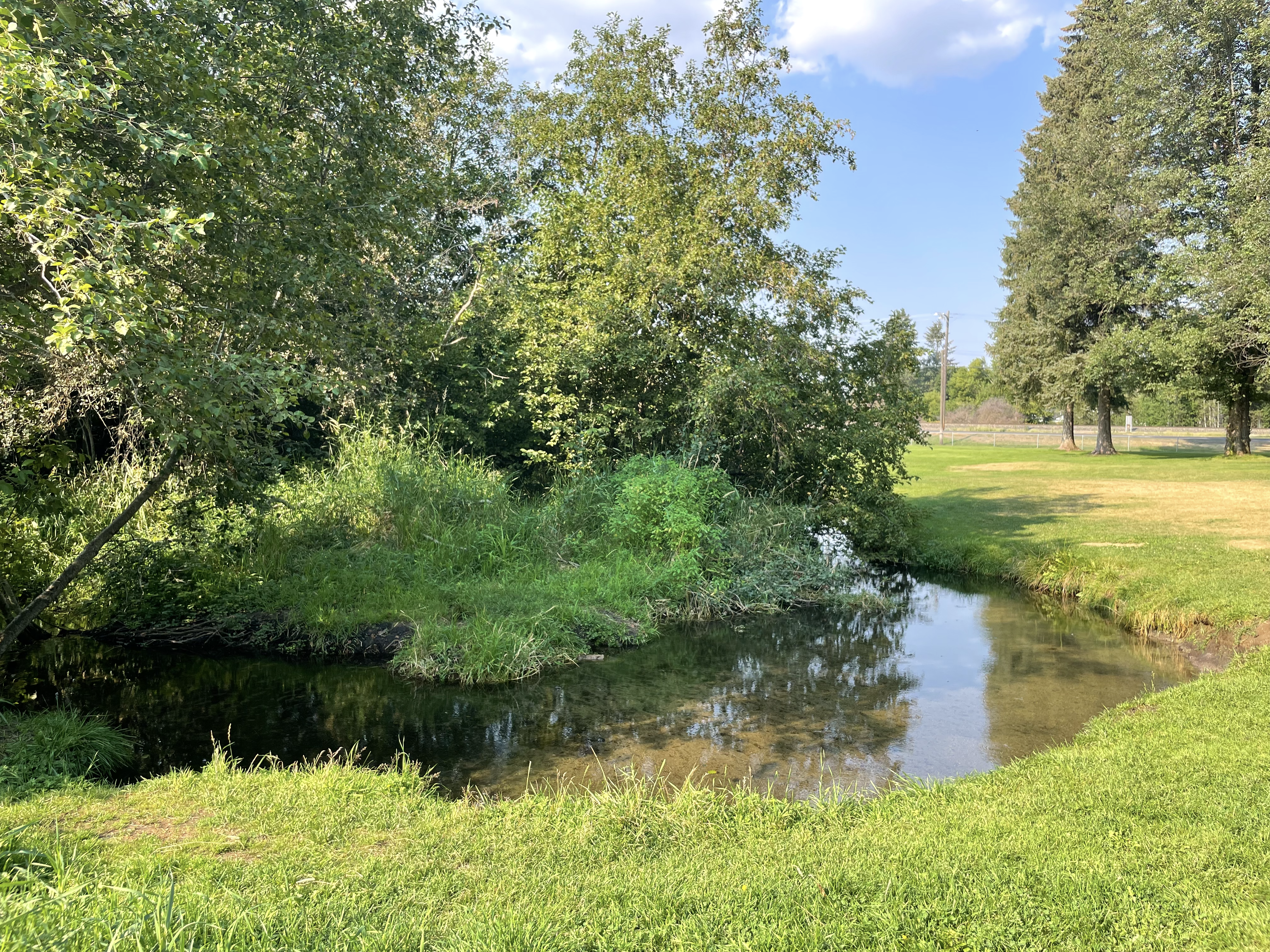
Spring Creek in Mix Park

According to the United States Census Bureau, the city has a total area of 6.89 square miles (17.85 km^{2}), all of it land.

=== Climate ===
According to the Köppen Climate Classification system, Deer Park has a Dry-summer continental climate, abbreviated "Dsb" on climate maps.

Climate data for Deer Park, Washington (Deer Park Airport), 1991–2020 normals, extremes 1998–present
Month	Jan	Feb	Mar	Apr	May	Jun	Jul	Aug	Sep	Oct	Nov	Dec	Year
Record high °F (°C)	54 (12)	60 (16)	70 (21)	85 (29)	91 (33)	111 (44)	106 (41)	105 (41)	97 (36)	83 (28)	64 (18)	59 (15)	111 (44)
Mean maximum °F (°C)	45.5 (7.5)	50.0 (10.0)	61.8 (16.6)	74.9 (23.8)	84.6 (29.2)	89.9 (32.2)	97.4 (36.3)	98.0 (36.7)	89.5 (31.9)	73.5 (23.1)	57.3 (14.1)	48.3 (9.1)	99.6 (37.6)
Mean daily maximum °F (°C)	33.9 (1.1)	38.8 (3.8)	48.5 (9.2)	57.5 (14.2)	67.4 (19.7)	73.1 (22.8)	84.2 (29.0)	84.2 (29.0)	74.0 (23.3)	57.5 (14.2)	41.9 (5.5)	33.1 (0.6)	57.8 (14.4)
Daily mean °F (°C)	27.5 (−2.5)	30.2 (−1.0)	37.6 (3.1)	44.7 (7.1)	53.3 (11.8)	58.6 (14.8)	66.3 (19.1)	65.5 (18.6)	57.0 (13.9)	44.6 (7.0)	34.1 (1.2)	27.2 (−2.7)	45.6 (7.5)
Mean daily minimum °F (°C)	21.1 (−6.1)	21.6 (−5.8)	26.6 (−3.0)	31.9 (−0.1)	39.2 (4.0)	44.0 (6.7)	48.4 (9.1)	46.8 (8.2)	39.9 (4.4)	31.7 (−0.2)	26.4 (−3.1)	21.3 (−5.9)	33.2 (0.7)
Mean minimum °F (°C)	−2.0 (−18.9)	2.5 (−16.4)	11.2 (−11.6)	20.1 (−6.6)	24.9 (−3.9)	33.4 (0.8)	36.0 (2.2)	36.3 (2.4)	28.1 (−2.2)	16.1 (−8.8)	8.5 (−13.1)	−1.7 (−18.7)	−9.3 (−22.9)
Record low °F (°C)	−28 (−33)	−14 (−26)	−12 (−24)	13 (−11)	18 (−8)	30 (−1)	32 (0)	31 (−1)	18 (−8)	0 (−18)	−17 (−27)	−17 (−27)	−28 (−33)
Average precipitation inches (mm)	2.89 (73)	1.63 (41)	2.27 (58)	1.91 (49)	1.92 (49)	1.91 (49)	0.61 (15)	0.73 (19)	0.82 (21)	2.00 (51)	2.77 (70)	3.06 (78)	22.52 (573)
Average precipitation days (≥ 0.01 in)	14.9	11.4	13.6	11.4	11.0	9.5	4.0	4.1	5.6	9.6	14.2	14.8	124.1
Source 1: NOAA
Source 2: National Weather Service (mean maxima/minima 2006–2020)

== Demographics ==
Historical population
Census	Pop.	Note	%±
1910	875		—
1920	1,103		26.1%
1930	1,009		−8.5%
1940	1,070		6.0%
1950	1,167		9.1%
1960	1,333		14.2%
1970	1,295		−2.9%
1980	2,140		65.3%
1990	2,278		6.4%
2000	3,017		32.4%
2010	3,652		21.0%
2020	4,383		20.0%
U.S. Decennial Census; 2015 Estimate

=== 2020 census ===
As of the 2020 census, Deer Park had a population of 4,383. The median age was 40.2 years. 24.4% of residents were under the age of 18 and 22.9% of residents were 65 years of age or older. For every 100 females there were 94.5 males, and for every 100 females age 18 and over there were 90.4 males age 18 and over.

0.0% of residents lived in urban areas, while 100.0% lived in rural areas.

There were 1,789 households in Deer Park, of which 31.2% had children under the age of 18 living in them. Of all households, 46.8% were married-couple households, 19.4% were households with a male householder and no spouse or partner present, and 28.3% were households with a female householder and no spouse or partner present. About 30.7% of all households were made up of individuals and 17.1% had someone living alone who was 65 years of age or older.

There were 1,901 housing units, of which 5.9% were vacant. The homeowner vacancy rate was 1.8% and the rental vacancy rate was 3.0%.

Racial composition as of the 2020 census
Race	Number	Percent
White	3,865	88.2%
Black or African American	42	1.0%
American Indian and Alaska Native	55	1.3%
Asian	29	0.7%
Native Hawaiian and Other Pacific Islander	14	0.3%
Some other race	51	1.2%
Two or more races	327	7.5%
Hispanic or Latino (of any race)	172	3.9%

=== 2010 census ===
As of the 2010 census, there were 3,652 people, 1,394 households, and 948 families living in the city. The population density was 530.0 inhabitants per square mile (204.6/km^{2}). There were 1,532 housing units at an average density of 222.4 per square mile (85.9/km^{2}). The racial makeup of the city was 92.6% White, 0.4% African American, 1.5% Native American, 0.2% Asian, 0.3% Pacific Islander, 1.2% from other races, and 3.9% from two or more races. Hispanic or Latino of any race were 3.8% of the population.

There were 1,394 households, of which 36.4% had children under the age of 18 living with them, 49.4% were married couples living together, 13.4% had a female householder with no husband present, 5.2% had a male householder with no wife present, and 32.0% were non-families. 27.0% of all households were made up of individuals, and 14.3% had someone living alone who was 65 years of age or older. The average household size was 2.61 and the average family size was 3.15.

The median age in the city was 36.3 years. 28.4% of residents were under the age of 18; 8.8% were between the ages of 18 and 24; 22.5% were from 25 to 44; 24% were from 45 to 64; and 16.2% were 65 years of age or older. The gender makeup of the city was 48.8% male and 51.2% female.

=== 2000 census ===
As of the 2000 census, there were 3,017 people, 1,105 households, and 756 families living in the city. The population density was 470.4 people per square mile (181.7/km^{2}). There were 1,210 housing units at an average density of 188.7 per square mile (72.9/km^{2}). The racial makeup of the city was 89.90% White, 2.3% African American, 1.36% Native American, 0.17% Asian, 0.07% Pacific Islander, 1.06% from other races, and 2.12% from two or more races. Hispanic or Latino of any race were 3.09% of the population. 22.2% were of German, 13.9% United States or American, 11.1% English, 7.2% Irish, 5.4% Norwegian and 5.2% French ancestry.

There were 1,105 households, out of which 38.7% had children under the age of 18 living with them, 50.2% were married couples living together, 13.3% had a female householder with no husband present, and 31.5% were non-families. 26.6% of all households were made up of individuals, and 14.2% had someone living alone who was 65 years of age or older. The average household size was 2.69 and the average family size was 3.24.

In the city, the age distribution of the population shows 32.5% under the age of 18, 7.3% from 18 to 24, 27.5% from 25 to 44, 18.0% from 45 to 64, and 14.7% who were 65 years of age or older. The median age was 34 years. For every 100 females, there were 91.1 males. For every 100 females age 18 and over, there were 83.8 males.

The median income for a household in the city was $32,470, and the median income for a family was $37,820. Males had a median income of $36,326 versus $19,825 for females. The per capita income for the city was $17,132. About 10.8% of families and 15.1% of the population were below the poverty line, including 17.5% of those under age 18 and 21.3% of those age 65 or over.

== Education ==
The Deer Park School District covers approximately 173 square miles (450 km^{2}) which encompasses approximately 10,000 households.

Almost all of the city limits is in the Deer Park district. A single block is in the Riverside School District..

== Transportation ==
Deer Park is served by the Spokane Transit Authority, which operates bus services in Spokane County. Deer Park also has an airport located three nautical miles (3.5 mi; 5.6 km) northeast, Deer Park Airport. This airport was previously known as Deer Park Municipal Airport.

== Notable people ==
- Gail M. Kelly, anthropologist
- Bob Lewis, member of the Washington State Senate
- Howie Slater, NFL fullback
- John Swiderski, video game designer and founder of Mean Hamster Software
- Judy Warnick, member of the Washington State Senate

== See also ==
- Deer Park Tribune
