= John Swiderski =

American video game designer

- Born: May 15, 1975 (age 51); Cleveland, Ohio, United States
- Occupations: Founder and CEO of Mean Hamster Software

John Swiderski (born May 15, 1975 in Cleveland, Ohio, U.S.) founded Mean Hamster Software in 1985 at the age of 10.

Swiderski was developing Commodore 64 games, and later Amiga games for the shareware market as lead programmer. John took a hiatus from programming in 1993 when Commodore went bankrupt and opened a retail computer store in Deer Park, Washington. In 1999, Swiderski began working on new Atari 5200 game cartridges for the newly popular retro-gaming surge. In 2004, Swiderski began work on Myst for Pocket PC as lead programmer. He also began working on several new game concepts as a Designer and Producer for the casual game market. Pet Shop Hop was released in 2008, followed by four more games in 2009.

John Swiderski was a board member of the WMMFA, the Washington Materials Management and Funding authority. A government appointed position.

== Games designed by John Swiderski ==
- Irata's Quest (unreleased)
- Pet Shop Hop (March 17, 2008)
- Grocery Story (unreleased)
- Everything Nice (April 2, 2009)
- Ye Olde Sandwich Shoppe (May 27, 2009)
- Passport to Perfume (July 21, 2009)
- Cat Wash (November 13, 2009)
- Vegas Nights (May 15, 2010)
- Remarkable Farkle (August 1, 2010)
