= Karl Stiefvater =

American software engineer

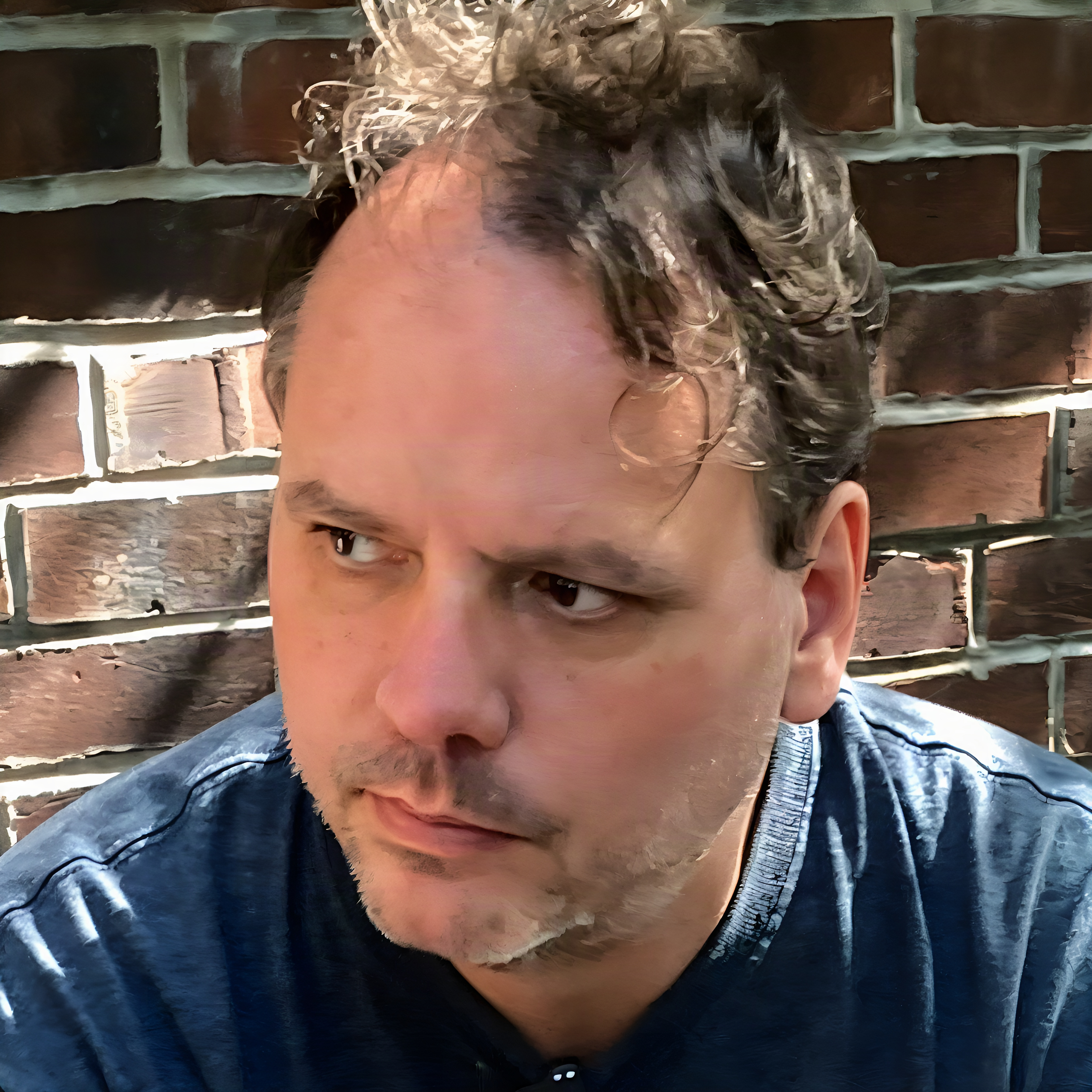
- Karl Stiefvater
- Born: February 20, 1970 (age 56)
- Other names: qarl; Qarl Linden (Second Life avatar name)
- Education: Washington University in St. Louis (BS, computer science)
- Occupation: Software engineer
- Known for: Riven shaders · sculpted prims in Second Life · Pikazo

Karl Stiefvater is an American computer graphics software engineer and visual effects artist based in St. Louis, Missouri. He wrote the lighting and water shaders of the 1997 video game Riven and spun that work into the shader company Lume, then worked on visual effects for The Matrix Reloaded, The Matrix Revolutions, and 300. He later created the "sculpted prims" building feature of the virtual world Second Life and built the neural style transfer app Pikazo. He was nominated for a News & Documentary Emmy Award in 2011 for The Virtual Mine, an educational Second Life project, and is the co-founder and chief executive of the custom snow-globe company Snow Day.

== Early life and education ==
Stiefvater was born on February 20, 1970, and grew up in his family's funeral home in St. Peters, Missouri. He was first published nationally as a high-school sophomore, when the Atari magazine ANALOG Computing ran his boot utility "Load It" in February 1986. He graduated from St. Louis University High School and earned a Bachelor of Science in computer science from Washington University in St. Louis in 1992.

== Career ==
=== Riven and Lume ===
Stiefvater served as computer graphics technical director on Riven, the 1997 sequel to Myst developed by Cyan. In Richard Kadrey's making-of book From Myst to Riven, Myst co-creator Robyn Miller said of his shader work: "The custom shaders really saved us. We could never get the water right with the shaders we started with. But once Karl wrote one that worked, we kept asking him to do others." According to Computer Graphics World, he "created several suites of shaders that Cyan artists used to produce realistic lighting, water, camera lens, and landscape effects", including an HDR glare shader used throughout the game. The magazine reported that the shaders "have proven themselves so well that a spin-off company Lume, Inc. (San Francisco), will be selling them". Stiefvater founded Lume in 1996 and served as its president; its LumeTools shader collection was later ported to the other major 3D packages. Months before the game shipped, the February 1997 Computer Graphics World put Riven on its cover, crediting Cyan's use of Lume's shaders, and made LumeTools the final pick of its survey of "a sampling of some of the best" 3D plug-ins.

=== Film visual effects ===
Stiefvater worked on visual effects for The Matrix Reloaded (2003) at Sony Pictures Imageworks, where he built tooling for the fiery destruction of the Nebuchadnezzar hovership — a sequence partly inspired by documentary footage of the Hindenburg disaster. "We broke the outer skin apart procedurally," Imageworks visual effects supervisor Jim Berney told Cinefex. "Karl Stiefvater created a map-driven device that allowed geometry to fragment but maintain its texture, so the skin could burn along predescribed lines and open up." On The Matrix Revolutions (2003), at ESC Entertainment, he created the swarming-sentinel destruction effects used in the film's battle sequences.

For the film 300 (2007), working at Meteor Studios in Montreal, he animated the wheat-field sequences using procedural displacement maps and reworked the effects of its "infamous bottomless pit" — in one profile's telling, "down to the specks of dirt on individual bricks inside the well".

=== Linden Lab and Second Life ===
Stiefvater joined Linden Lab, the developer of Second Life, where he worked under the avatar name Qarl Linden. He created "sculpted prims" — or "sculpties" — a building feature that let residents make organic shapes, defined by textures rather than mesh coordinates. Announced in April 2007 and released across the platform that May, the feature arrived with Stiefvater giving away sculpted fruit in-world — Axel Springer's Second Life weekly The AvaStar photographed the giveaway in its launch-week issue. Daniel Terdiman's 2008 book The Entrepreneur's Guide to Second Life profiled him as the feature's creator, calling the sculpted prim "to many people, the most exciting Second Life technological innovation in recent memory". He also built touch-position detection for scripted objects, presented "Open Source in Second Life" at the May 2008 Libre Graphics Meeting in Wrocław, and later that year drew notice from New World Notes for opening his quarterly performance review to Second Life residents' comments.

In August 2010, while he was at work on the platform's mesh-import feature, Linden Lab laid Stiefvater off — a move that drew protest from the Second Life community, including a petition for his reinstatement. Reporting the layoff, blogger Tateru Nino published excerpts of an internal performance review that praised his work. Later that month he joined the development team of Emerald, then one of the most popular third-party Second Life viewers, used by as many as half of its residents, and kept building tools for the platform's users — including a prim-alignment tool that third-party viewers adopted and that Linden Lab, in 2012, declined to merge into its own.

In October 2011, Second Life content creators hired Stiefvater themselves: a fundraiser launched by designer Maxwell Graf met its goal in under three weeks, paying him to develop a "parametric mesh deformer" that would make mesh clothing fit diverse avatar shapes. Essayist Gwyneth Llewelyn described the arrangement as a new, community-funded model of Second Life development. He released an alpha at the end of 2011, but Linden Lab never adopted the code; when the company announced its own "Fitted Mesh" approach in November 2013, Stiefvater called its technical reasoning "mostly good" while criticizing "the two year delay and refusal to communicate". The competing virtual world InWorldz paid him to complete the deformer for its own viewer in 2013. That October, he left Second Life altogether — deleting the virtual region he had kept for eight years in protest of the platform's revised terms of service: "the second life terms of service, as it is currently written, lets LL steal all of my intellectual property. shame on you LL."

=== The Virtual Mine ===
Stiefvater was the software engineer of The Virtual Mine, a Sand Castle Studios project that created an interactive Second Life companion to the PBS Independent Lens documentary Deep Down: A Story From the Heart of Coal Country. It was nominated for a 2011 News & Documentary Emmy Award (New Approaches to News & Documentary Programming: Documentaries), with Stiefvater among the individually credited nominees.

=== Magic Ink and Pikazo ===
Stiefvater's iPad finger-painting app Magic Ink simulated a springy brush whose calligraphic strokes began to disappear the moment the finger left the screen; he described its recipe as "one part doodle, one part dance, one part calligraphy, one part springs, one part clouds, four parts imagination". O'Reilly Media's 2011 guide Best iPad Apps selected it as "Best App for Drawings that Disappear" — "as much a piece of interactive performance art" as a drawing tool, in the guide's words.

In September 2015, The Washington Post published Stiefvater's series of United States presidential portraits re-rendered in the style of Pablo Picasso using a neural style transfer algorithm. The response led him to build Pikazo, an iOS app applying neural style transfer to users' photos. The Riverfront Times profiled Stiefvater — a St. Louis native who had returned to the city in 2011 — ahead of the app's App Store debut on November 15, 2015. Within a month of launch, Pikazo reached No. 1 overall on iPhone App Store charts in two European markets. That December, Steven Levy featured Stiefvater in a Backchannel article on the neural-art movement, writing that he "feels that breaking down even the most radical forms of genius is ultimately a math problem": "I like artistic creativity, [but] I am not of the belief that [that creation] is supernatural. It's a mechanism — a cogwork." St. Louis Magazine reported that within weeks of launch the app had processed more than 100,000 images — more than a million by the following spring. In December 2016, the St. Louis Post-Dispatch profiled the company — calling Stiefvater "the Pikazo mastermind" — and reported that partnerships with Amazon and Intel had let it make the app free, that Apple had requested a Siri integration in exchange for featured placement, and that the team had released a companion app, Coloring Book by Pikazo.

=== Snow Day ===
In 2012, Stiefvater made a custom snow globe of his family's house — modeled from photographs and 3D-printed — as a surprise gift for his wife, Lisa Donahue; his tutorial for the build was featured by Cory Doctorow on Boing Boing. Six years later, the gift became a company: Snow Day, co-founded in St. Louis with Donahue and Amy VanDonsel and led by Stiefvater as chief executive, builds custom snow globes around 3D-printed full-color miniatures generated from customers' video by photogrammetry. When Hidden Valley Ranch commissioned a globe for its holiday gift catalog — a miniature ranch-dressing bottle in a Santa hat — the run sold out within days.

== Teaching ==
Stiefvater returned to Washington University's computer science department in the late 1990s as a lecturer on graphics. Between 1998 and 2001 he created and taught undergraduate courses there: a graphics laboratory focused on 3D rendering, a genetic-algorithms laboratory, and "Computational Art" — a survey of generative techniques, from L-systems and fractals to artificial life, whose output media ran from video and plotters to embroidery machines, cookies, and 3D fabricators. He also lectured the department's formal-foundations course. Out of the computational-art program came "waterworks", a student-built water-simulation installation — in his description, a "lifesize interactive virtual shower" — exhibited in the Emerging Technologies program of SIGGRAPH 2001 and at galleries and other venues through 2003.

A decade later, between 2011 and 2013, he taught recurring eight-week online courses for CGWorkshops, the CGSociety's training program: "Creating Maya Plugins", on extending Maya through its C++ API, and "Writing Shaders for Renderman and Mental Ray".
