= Howie Slater =

American football player (1903–1964)

Profile
- Position: Fullback

Personal information
- Born: March 9, 1903; Deer Park, Washington, U.S.
- Died: March 18, 1964 (aged 61); Minneapolis, Minnesota, U.S.
- Listed height: 5 ft 10 in (1.78 m)
- Listed weight: 186 lb (84 kg)

Career information
- College: Washington State

Career history
- Milwaukee Badgers (1926)

Career statistics
- Games played: 9
- Stats at Pro Football Reference

Howard Whitman "Duke" Slater (March 9, 1903 – March 18, 1964) was an American fullback in the National Football League (NFL). He played with the Milwaukee Badgers during the 1926 NFL season.

Slater was born in Deer Park, Washington, in 1903. He attended Deer Park High School where he was captain of the football team. He next attended Washington State University where he played at the fullback position for the football team. He was captain of the 1924 Washington State team and received honorable mention from Walter Camp on the 1924 All-America college football team.

Slater played professional football in the NFL. He played at the fullback position for the Milwaukee Badgers, appearing in every minute of every game during the 1926 season.

After his football career ended, Slater worked in the petroleum industry. He lived in Minneapolis starting in approximately 1949. He died in Minneapolis in 1964 at age 61.
