= Deer Park Airport (Washington) =

- IATA: none; ICAO: KDEW; FAA LID: DEW

Summary
- Airport type: Public
- Owner: City of Deer Park
- Serves: Deer Park, Washington
- Elevation AMSL: 2,211 ft (674 m)
- Coordinates: 47°58′01″N 117°25′43″W
- Interactive map of Deer Park Airport

Runways
Direction	Length		Surface
Direction	ft	m	Surface
16/34	6,101	1,860	Asphalt
5/23	3,200	975	Asphalt

Statistics (2021)
- Aircraft operations: 36,540
- Based aircraft: 73
- Source: Federal Aviation Administration

Deer Park Airport (ICAO: KDEW, FAA LID: DEW), formerly known as Deer Park Municipal Airport, is a city-owned public-use airport located three nautical miles (6 km) northeast of the central business district of Deer Park, a city in Spokane County, Washington, United States.

Although most U.S. airports use the same three-letter location identifier for the FAA and IATA, this airport is assigned DEW by the FAA but has no designation from the IATA.

== History ==
The Deer Park Airport was originally built in 1944 as part of the World War II effort. It originally had three 6,100 foot runways built to suit the B-29 Superfortress.

After the war, which ended a year after the airport's completion, Deer Park was mainly used for drag racing.

The airport was selected as an installation site for an Intercontinental Ballistic Missile during the Cold War. The missile was decommissioned in 1965 when the Atlas generation of missiles was replaced by the Titan II and the Minuteman.

As of 2019, the airport has two maintenance and restoration shops as well as a flight school.

New hangars were built in the 21st century, including one big enough to house a corporate jet.

== Facilities and aircraft ==
=== Facilities ===
Deer Park Airport covers an area of 1,796 acres (727 ha) at an elevation of 2,211 feet (674 m) above mean sea level. It has two asphalt paved runways: runway 16/34 measures 6,101 by 75 feet (1,860 x 23 m) and runway 5/23 measures 3,200 by 60 feet (975 x 18 m).

The airport has a fixed-base operator that sells fuel. Both avgas and jet fuel are available. There are also services such as general maintenance and a courtesy car as well as amenities like internet and vending machines.

Parts of airport grounds are maintained to provide trails, hiking, horseback riding, and winter sports.

In 2025, it was announced the airport would receive $585,000 to construct new taxi lanes.

=== Aircraft ===
For the 12-month period ending December 31, 2021, the airport had 36,540 general aviation aircraft operations, an average of 100 per day: At that time there were 73 aircraft based at this airport: 66 single-engine, 2 multi-engine, 1 jet, 1 helicopter, and 3 glider.

== Accidents and incidents ==
- On March 17, 2002, a Cessna 120 was damaged during a runway excursion at the Deer Park Airport. The airplane reportedly bounced during a simulated crosswind landing, and directional control was lost.
- On January 14, 2004, a Cessna 185 Skywagon was substantially damaged following a loss of control during landing roll at the Deer Park Airport. The probable cause of the accident was found to be the dual student pilot's failure to maintain directional control during the landing roll and the failure of the flight instructor to provide remedial action.
- On June 23, 2004, a Piper PA-20 Pacer was substantially damaged following a main gear collapse while landing at Deer Park Airport. The probable cause of the accident was found to be the flight instructor's delayed remedial action.
- On October 19, 2013, a Zenith STOL CH 701 was damaged while landing at the Deer Park Airport. The pilot reported that the airplane encountered a tailwind that caused the airplane to rapidly descend and land hard. The probable cause of the accident was found the pilot's inadequate flare and failure to maintain control of the airplane during the landing with a tailwind.
- On October 2, 2015, an experimental Coot A airplane impacted terrain one mile north of the Deer Park Airport. The probable cause of the accident was the pilot's failure to maintain sufficient airspeed and his exceedance of the airplane's critical angle of attack, which resulted in an aerodynamic stall and subsequent spin. Contributing to the accident was the pilot's diverted attention due to the rough running engine, which resulted from a rich fuel/air mixture, and the pilot's decision to conduct the flight in the airplane in which he had little experience flying despite knowing the airplane had preexisting engine problems.
- On July 7, 2023, a Supermarine Spitfire Mk. IX was damaged during a runway excursion at the Deer Park Airport. The probable cause of the accident was found to be the pilot's failure to maintain directional control during landing with a crosswind.

== See also ==
- List of airports in Washington
