= Mean Hamster Software =

American video game company

Mean Hamster Software, Inc.
- Type: Private
- Industry: Computer and video games
- Founded: 1985
- Founder: John Swiderski
- Defunct: September 2012; 14 years ago
- Headquarters: Deer Park, Washington
- Key people: John Swiderski, CEO and founder
- Products: Cat Wash, Passport to Perfume, Ye Olde Sandwich Shoppe, Everything Nice, Myst, Riven, Pet Shop Hop, Vegas Nights and Exidy games
- Number of employees: 14 (2012)
- Website: meanhamster.com

Mean Hamster Software, Inc. was a video game developer founded by John Swiderski in 1985. Mean Hamster Software created several games for the Atari 5200 from 1999-2004. They then created Myst for Windows Mobile in 2005, and after the release of Riven: The Sequel to Myst for Pocket PC in 2006, Mean Hamster began work on its first casual games. The company was located in Deer Park, Washington (just outside Spokane, WA).

In 2006, Mean Hamster Software acquired the rights to the Exidy catalog, which includes titles such as Crossbow, Venture and Mouse Trap.

The company closed its doors and laid off all its remaining employees in September 2012.

Mean Hamster Software announced it's return to development with a new Operating System HamsterOS coming later in 2026.

== Casual game development ==
In 2007, Mean Hamster began work on casual games and partnered with PlayFirst to produce a casual game entitled Pet Shop Hop which was released in March 2008. From there, Mean Hamster partnered with Big Fish Games, Namco and Mesmo, Inc. to develop more titles. Games developed by Mean Hamster Software include:

- Pet Shop Hop(March 21, 2008)
- Everything Nice (April 2, 2009)
- Ye Olde Sandwich Shoppe(May 27, 2009)
- Passport to Perfume (July 21, 2009)
- Cat Wash (November 13, 2009)
- Vegas Nights (Facebook)(May 15, 2010)
- Remarkable Farkle (August 1, 2010)
- Crossbow for iPhone (September 9, 2010)
- Sushi Quiz (November 21, 2010)
- Hospitopia(January 10, 2011)
- Vegas Nights (GSN) (April, 2011)
- Lizzie's Royal Dinner (April, 2011)
- Mother Nature (Feb 13th, 2012)
- Bee Craft (July 20, 2012)

Mean Hamster Software was named one of Washington State's "Top Video Game Developers" in the September 2008 Issue of Washington CEO magazine.
