= Riverside School District (Washington) =

School district in Washington, United States

Address
- 34515 N. Newport Hwy. Spokane County, Washington, U.S.
- Coordinates: 47°58′08″N 117°20′59″W

District information
- Type: Public
- Motto: Belong. Bond. Believe.
- Grades: Pre-kindergarten–12th grade
- Superintendent: Ken Russell
- Schools: 5
- NCES District ID: 5307440

Students and staff
- Students: 1,604 (as of 2023–24)
- Teachers: 89.30 (FTE)
- Student–teacher ratio: 17.96
- District mascot: Rams

Other information
- Website: riversidesd.org

Riverside School District is a school district headquartered in Chattaroy, Washington. The district contains 5 schools in the surrounding area.

== Schools ==
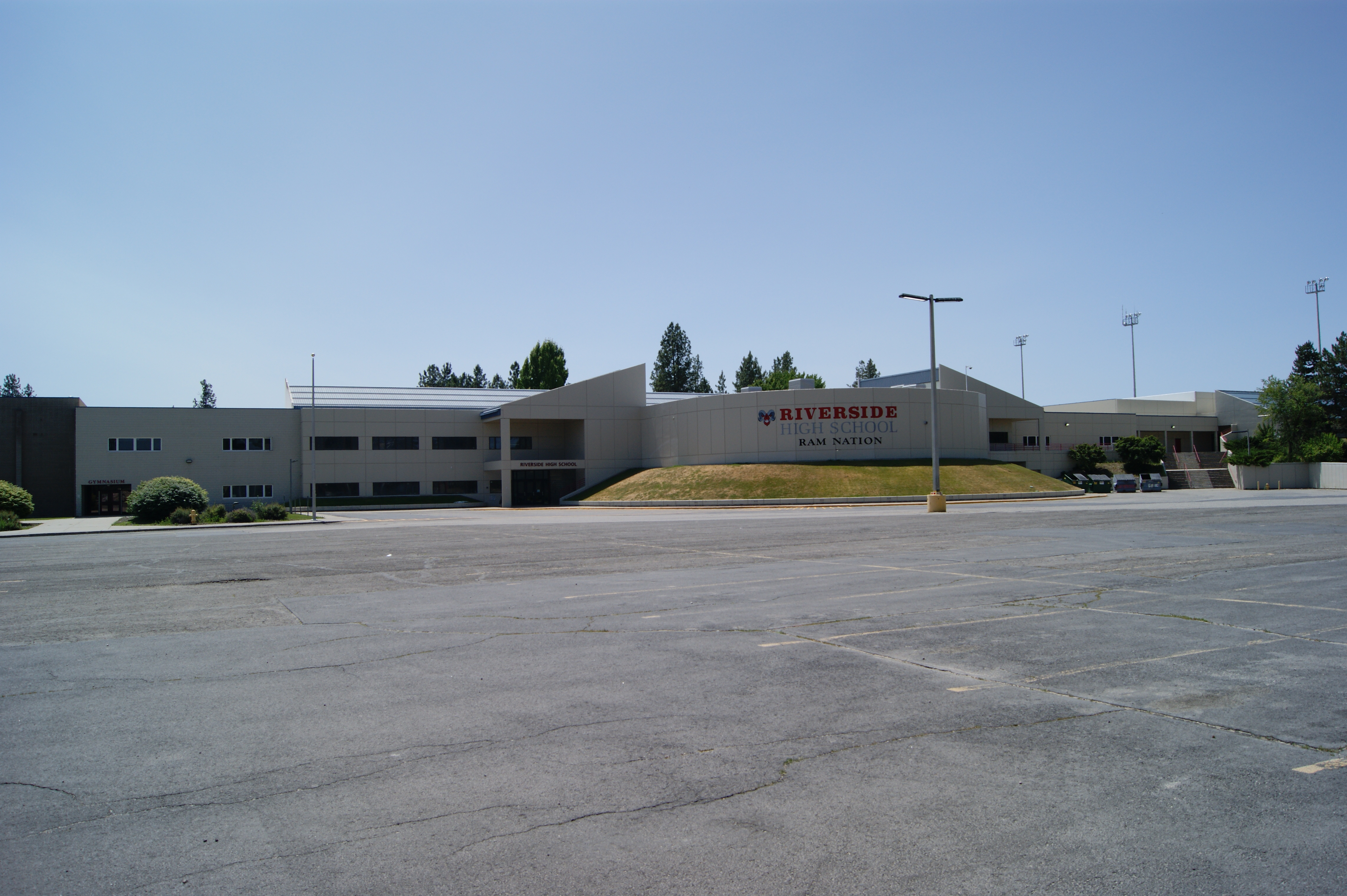
Riverside High School

- Riverside High School
- Riverside Middle School
- Chattaroy Elementary School
- Riverside Elementary School
- Riverside Achievement Center
- Riverside Independent Scholar Program

== Student Data ==
From circa 2000 to 2020 annually the number of students fell by about 3%. However, from 2019 to 2020 the school district had an increase from about 1,280 students to 1,538 students. The enrollment increase gave the district funds to buy additional equipment.

In the 2019-2020 school year, Riverside held a 90% rate of regular student attendance along with 90.1% graduation rate. 85% are deemed "On Track" (a statistic measuring the percentage of students who passed all 9th grade courses). At Riverside High School in the 2018-2019 school year, 438 students were enrolled, with about 56% of student enrollment male and 44% female.
