= Myst =

1993 video game

- Box art, showing an aerial view of the island of Myst, one of the key settings of the game
- Developer: Cyan (Note: Saturn version developed by Sunsoft; PlayStation version developed by Alfa System; 3DO version developed by Microcabin; PlayStation Portable, Nintendo DS, and Nintendo 3DS versions developed by Hoplite Research.)
- Publishers: Broderbund: Mac OS Broderbund Saturn; JP/EU: Sunsoft; NA: Acclaim Entertainment PlayStation; JP: SoftBank; NA/EU: Psygnosis 3DO; JP: Micro Cabin; NA: Sunsoft Windows; NA: Broderbund; EU: Red Orb Entertainment Jaguar CD Atari Corporation CD-i; EU: Philips Media AmigaOS; EU: PXL Computers PlayStation Portable; JP: Sega; WW: Midway Nintendo DS; EU: Midway; NA: Empire Interactive (original); NA: Storm City Games (updated) iOS Cyan Nintendo 3DS; NA: Maximum Family Games; AU/EU: Funbox Media Android Noodlecake Games
- Directors: Rand Miller; Robyn Miller
- Producer: Laurie Strand
- Designers: Rand Miller; Robyn Miller
- Artists: Robyn Miller; Chuck Carter
- Composer: Robyn Miller
- Series: Myst
- Platform: Mac OS: Windows, 3DO, Sega Saturn, Atari Jaguar CD, PlayStation, CD-i, AmigaOS, Pocket PC, PlayStation Portable, Nintendo DS, iOS, Nintendo 3DS
- Release: September 24, 1993: Mac OS; NA: September 24, 1993 Windows; NA: March 1994 3DO; NA: March 17, 1995 Saturn; NA/PAL: September 1995 Jaguar CD; NA: December 15, 1995; PAL: 1995 PlayStation; NA: October 15, 1996; PAL: November 15, 1996 CD-i; EU: 1996 AmigaOS; EU: 1997 PlayStation Portable; JP: March 30, 2006; NA: July 16, 2009 Nintendo DS; EU: December 7, 2007; NA: May 13, 2008 iOS; WW: May 2, 2009 Nintendo 3DS; NA: October 26, 2012; EU: September 5, 2013
- Genre: Adventure
- Mode: Single-player

Myst is a 1993 adventure video game developed by Cyan and published by Broderbund for Mac OS. In the game, the player travels via a special book to a mysterious island called Myst. The player interacts with objects and traverses the environment by clicking on pre-rendered imagery. Solving puzzles allows the player to travel to other worlds ("Ages"), which reveal the backstory of the game's characters and help the player make the choice of whom to aid.

Designers Rand and Robyn Miller had started in game development creating black-and-white, largely plotless works aimed at children. They wanted Myst to be a graphically impressive game with a nonlinear story and mystery elements aimed at adults. The game's design was limited by the small memory footprint of video game consoles and by the slow speed of CD-ROM drives. The game was created on Apple Macintosh computers and ran on the HyperCard software stack, though ports to other platforms subsequently required the creation of a new engine.

Myst was a critical and commercial success. Critics lauded the ability of the game to immerse players in its fictional worlds. It has been called one of the best and most influential video games ever made. Selling more than six million copies, Myst was the best-selling PC game for nearly a decade. The game helped drive adoption of the CD-ROM drive, spawned a multimedia franchise, and inspired clones, parodies, and new video game genres, as well as spin-off novels and other media. The game has been ported to multiple platforms and remade multiple times.

== Gameplay ==
Screenshot of the eponymous Myst Island. Solving a puzzle raises the ship in the foreground and allows the player to reach the Stoneship Age. The library in the background contains books that describe the different Ages the player can link to.

Myst's gameplay consists of a first-person journey through an interactive world. Players can interact with specific objects on some screens by clicking or dragging them. The player moves by clicking on locations shown on the screen; the scene then crossfades into another frame, and the player can explore the new area. Myst has an optional "Zip" feature to assist in rapidly crossing areas already explored; when a lightning bolt cursor appears, players can click and skip several frames to another location. While this provides a rapid method of travel, it can also cause players to miss important items and clues. Some items can be carried by the player and read, including journal pages which provide backstory. Players can only carry a single page at a time, and pages return to their original locations when dropped.

To complete the game, the player must fully explore the island of Myst. There, the player discovers and follows clues to be transported via "linking books" to several "Ages", each of which is a self-contained mini-world. Each of the Ages—named Selenitic, Stoneship, Mechanical, and Channelwood—requires the user to solve a series of logical, interrelated puzzles to complete its exploration. Each Age must be explored to solve the game's primary puzzle on Myst.

Apart from its predominantly nonverbal storytelling, Myst's gameplay was unusual among adventure games in several ways. The player is provided with very little backstory at the beginning of the game, and no obvious goals or objectives are laid out. There are no obvious enemies, no physical violence, no time limit to complete the game, and no threat of dying at any point. The game unfolds at its own pace and is solved through a combination of patience, observation, and logical thinking.

== Plot ==
Players assume the role of an unnamed person who stumbles across an unusual book titled "Myst". The player reads the book and discovers a detailed description of an island world. Placing their hand on the last page, the player is transported to the world described and is left with no choice but to explore the island. In the island's library, two books can be found, colored red and blue. These books are traps that hold Sirrus and Achenar, the sons of Atrus, who once lived on Myst island with his wife Catherine. Atrus writes special linking books that transport people to the Ages that the books describe. From the panels of their books, Sirrus and Achenar tell the player that Atrus is dead; each brother blames the other for the death of their family, as well as the destruction of much of Atrus's library. Both plead for help to escape. The books are missing several pages, rendering the sons' messages unclear and riddled with static.

As the player continues to explore the island, books linking to more Ages are discovered hidden behind complex mechanisms and puzzles. The player must visit each Age, find the red and blue pages hidden there, and return to Myst Island. These pages can then be placed in the corresponding books. As the player adds more pages to these books, the brothers can be seen and heard more clearly. After collecting four pages, the brothers tell the player where the fifth and final missing page for their book is hidden; if the player can complete either book, that brother will be set free. The player is left with a choice to help Sirrus, Achenar, or neither.

Sirrus and Achenar beg the player not to touch the green book located by their final pages, claiming it to be another trap book like their own. In truth, it leads to D'ni, where Atrus is imprisoned. When the book is opened, Atrus asks the player to bring him a final page that is hidden on Myst Island. The game has several endings, depending on the player's actions. Giving either Sirrus or Achenar the final page of their book causes the player to switch places with the son, leaving the player trapped inside the prison book as the son rips the pages out. Linking to D'ni without the page Atrus asks for leaves the player and Atrus trapped in D'ni. Bringing Atrus the page allows him to complete his Myst book and return to the island. Upon his return, Atrus returns to his writing and allows the player to explore Myst and its Ages at their leisure, while also asking them to be on hand to help in the future, as he was contending with a greater foe than his sons (setting the stage for Riven). Upon returning to the library, the player finds the red and blue books gone, and burn marks on the shelves where they used to be.

== Development ==
=== Background ===
In the late 1980s, brothers Rand and Robyn Miller were living apart in the United States. Robyn was taking a year off from university in Washington state, writing and trying to establish residency, while Rand worked in Texas as a computer programmer for a bank. Rand approached his brother with the idea of making an interactive storybook using HyperCard. The brothers were not big video game players themselves, although they were familiar with Dungeons & Dragons and had played Zork. In his parents' basement—Robyn did not own a computer himself—Robyn began drawing pictures and creating a nonlinear story that would eventually become their first game, The Manhole. The Manhole and the games that followed—Cosmic Osmo and Spelunx—were specifically aimed at children and shared the same aesthetics: black-and-white graphics, point-and-click gameplay, a first-person point of view, and explorable worlds. Robyn recalled that the games were more about exploration than narrative: "In the projects we did for children, we didn't really tell stories ... They were just these worlds that you would explore."

Around 1990, the brothers decided to create a game that would appeal to adults. Among their goals were believable characters, a non-linear story, and for the player as protagonist to make ethical choices. The Millers pitched the game to Activision under the title The Gray Summons; Robyn recalled that Activision told them to stick to children's games. At the time of the rejection, they were not doing well financially—"we were eating rice and beans and government cheese and that [was] our diet." Facing the end of their game-producing career, Japanese developer Sunsoft approached the Millers to create an adult-oriented game. Like with The Gray Summons, the Millers wanted their game to have a non-linear story with believable characters and an ethical choice. They also wanted to produce a game with far more impressive graphics than their previous efforts, at one point considering an entirely hand-drawn game. They also knew their story would be a mystery.

Development of Myst began in 1991. The game's creative team consisted of brothers Rand and Robyn, with help from sound designer Chris Brandkamp, 3D artist and animator Chuck Carter, Richard Watson, Bonnie McDowall and Ryan Miller, who together made up Cyan, Inc. Myst was the largest and most time-consuming collaboration Cyan had attempted at that point. Cyan took inspiration from games like Zork, Star Wars' mythic universe, portals to other worlds like in C. S. Lewis' The Chronicles of Narnia, and the mysterious islands of old literature like the works of Jules Verne. The game's name, as well as the overall solitary and mysterious atmosphere of the island, was inspired by the book The Mysterious Island by Verne.

Sunsoft was not interested in the PC market and was focused on the video game console market instead. At the time, consoles had no hard drives and small memory buffers, meaning the game had to be designed around these technical constraints. To solve this issue, they compartmentalized parts of the game's environments into the different Ages. The Millers decided that most people did not like puzzles. Thus, a good puzzle would feel familiar and part of the world—not like a puzzle, but something for players to figure out like a circuit breaker in their house, using observation and common sense. Cyan did not have fans to please, and did not know exactly who the game would appeal to; Robyn felt like they did not have to second-guess their choices and could "explore the world as we were designing" and build a game for themselves. Rand stated that they strived to design the puzzles in Myst and their subsequent games by trying to balance three aspects: the puzzles themselves, the environment, and the story. They wanted to make sure that clues to the solutions to puzzles were apparent and presented to the player in a manner for these connections to be made: "once the player finds the solution, if they blame us, then we haven't done a good job. But if they blame themselves, then we have."

The Millers prepared a seven-page game proposal for Sunsoft from their ideas, mostly consisting of maps of the islands they had envisioned. Cyan proposed Myst to Sunsoft for $265,000—more than double what they thought it would cost to develop the game, but ultimately less than the game's final cost. (Note: In a 1995 interview, the Millers said the game cost $600,000, half of which came from Sunsoft; The New York Daily News gave the game's budget as $700,000 in 1997.) Sunsoft had asked the brothers if their game would be as good as the upcoming The 7th Guest, another CD-ROM video game that had been shown in public preview demonstrations; the Millers assured them it would. After getting the go-ahead, Cyan play-tested the entire game in a role-played Dungeons and Dragons form to identify any large issues before entering full production.

=== Production ===
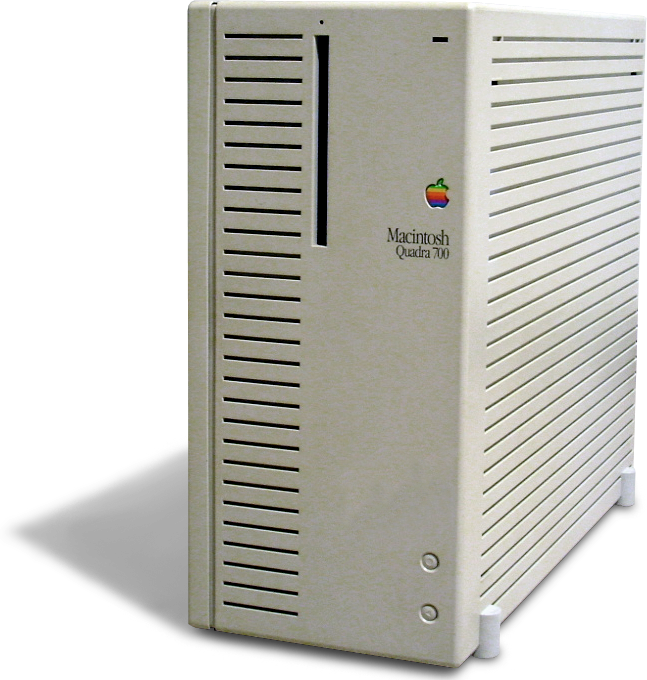
Macintosh computers such as the Quadra 700 were used to develop Myst. Slow single-speed CD-ROM drives and game console memory limitations proved to be constraints.

Myst was not only the largest project Cyan had attempted, but also took the longest to develop. The brothers spent months designing the look and puzzles of the Ages, which were influenced by earlier whimsical worlds made for children. Much of the early development time was spent devising puzzles and the Ages, and the story was secondary. "We were place designers [...] and the maps kind of fueled the story," Rand said. The plot evolved in tandem with the changing environment, developing new story details with each new building in the world. They realized that the setting would require developing more story and history than the players would actually see. The climactic ending with Atrus was a later development in the game's story, after Cyan realized they wanted to create a more complicated ending. In retrospect, Robyn felt that Myst did not quite provoke the emotional reaction and ethical quandary they set out to create.

The game was created on Macintosh computers, principally the Macintosh Quadra 700, using the HyperCard software. Cyan discovered using 3D rendering software was faster than the hand-drawn figures that they had used on their previous titles, and allowed the addition of color. The terrain for the Ages were created starting with grayscale heightmaps that were extruded to create changes in elevation. From this basic terrain, textures were painted onto a colormap that was wrapped around the landscapes. Objects such as trees were added to complete the design. Rand noted that attention to detail allowed Myst to deal with the limitations of CD-ROM drives and graphics, stating: "A lot can be done with texture ... Like finding an interesting texture you can map into the tapestry on the wall, spending a little extra time to actually put the bumps on the tapestry, putting screws in things. These are the things you don't necessarily notice, but if they weren't there, would flag to your subconscious that this is fake." The environments were rendered in StrataVision 3D, with some additional modeling in Macromedia MacroModel, while Rand would place those images into HyperCard to link them up and test the puzzle aspects. Overall, Myst contains 2,500 frames, one for each possible area the player can explore. The final images for the game were edited and enhanced using Photoshop 1.0.

When Cyan began development, creating believable characters was a major hurdle. The brothers were limited to one-way communication with the player, and at any point, a player could choose to walk away and "break the spell" of the game. Displaying video in the game was initially infeasible. Designing around the limits, the designers created the trap books, which were location-specific, one-way communication devices. The release of QuickTime halfway through development of the game solved the video issue.

The original HyperCard Macintosh version of Myst had each Age as a unique HyperCard stack. Navigation was handled by the internal button system and HyperTalk scripts, with image and QuickTime movie display passed off to various plugins; essentially, Myst functions as a series of separate multimedia slides linked together by commands. The main technical constraint that impacted Myst was slow CD-ROM drive read speeds—few consumers had anything faster than single-speed drives, limiting the speed of streaming data off the disc. Cyan had to go to great lengths to make sure all the game elements loaded as quickly as possible. Images were stored as 8-bit PICT resources with custom color palettes and QuickTime still image compression. Animated elements such as movies and object animations were encoded as QuickTime movies with Cinepak compression; in total, there were more than 66 minutes of Quicktime animation. This careful processing made the finished graphics look like truecolor images despite their low bit depth; the stills were reduced in size from 500 kB to around 80 kB. The Millers tried to place related scenes and files close together on the disc's spiral track to reduce the seek time and in-game delay as the player transitions from scene to scene.

Cyan play-tested the game with two people sitting in front of the game, finding that they would converse with each other and vocalize their likes and dislikes compared to one person silently playing. Rand and Robyn sat behind the testers taking notes, and could make on-the-fly changes and fixes. Cyan wanted the interface of the game to be invisible, and to craft a game that a wide audience would enjoy. Early on they had decided that there would be no inventory, enemies, or ways to die; eventually, they included a save system as a concession to the fact that it would take most players months to complete the game. Among the problems testers discovered with the story was that Myst had no inciting incident. In response, Cyan added a note that clued players in to a chamber that played a message explaining the game's objectives.

=== Audio ===
Chris Brandkamp served as sound engineer on Myst; he also doubled as Cyan's chief financial officer. Brandkamp produced most of the ambient and incidental sounds in the game. To make sure the sounds fit, Brandkamp had to wait until the game's visuals were placed in context. Sound effects were drawn from unlikely sources; the noise of a fire in a boiler was created by driving slowly over stones in a driveway because recordings of actual fire did not sound like fire burning. The chimes of a large clock tower were simulated using a wrench, then transposed to a lower pitch. Audio of bubbles, which he recalled as "the most hateful sound", was created by blowing bubbles into differently-sized tubes in a toilet.

At first, Myst had no music, because the Millers did not want music to interfere with the gameplay. After a few tests, they realized that the background music did not adversely affect the game and heightened the mood of certain areas. Robyn Miller ended up composing 40 minutes of synthesized music that was used in the game and later published as Myst: The Soundtrack. Mixing and effects were done on an E-mu Proteus MPS synthesizer. The soundtrack was recorded over the course of two weeks' evenings. Initially, Cyan released the soundtrack via a mail-order service, but before the release of Myst's sequel, Riven, Virgin Records acquired the rights to release the soundtrack, and the CD was re-released on April 21, 1998. A limited-edition 2-LP vinyl release was released in April 2021. The release includes two colored LPs (pink and blue) with a vinyl-exclusive never-before-released track, "AUDIO TRIAL 31—AGE FOUR", as well as never-before-seen documents, photographs, maps, and artifacts.

== Release ==
Myst was released for Macintosh computers on September 24, 1993, marketed with the tagline "The Surrealistic Adventure That Will Become Your World". Sample discs featuring a demo of the game's Myst Island portion were made available as previews. The game was ported to Windows in March 1994. Publicity for the game relied on word of mouth, especially over the internet.

Myst became a massive commercial success. Prior to release, Rand Miller believed selling 100,000 copies would be "mind-blowing"; it sold double that amount in seven months. The game quickly became Broderbund's most successful title, selling more than 500,000 copies by the end of 1994, and more than one million copies by March 1995. It was the best-selling computer game in the United States for 52 months. By 1997, Myst had sold 3.5 million copies. It sold more than 6.3 million units worldwide by 2000, including more than 4.3 million in the United States; and was the bestselling PC game throughout the 1990s until The Sims exceeded its sales in 2002. Along with The 7th Guest, Myst was a killer application that accelerated the sales of CD-ROM drives. The game was the first CD-ROM title to sell more than two million units.

== Remakes and ports ==
Myst has been remade for PC multiple times since its release.

The dock from the starting position on Myst Island as a pre-rendered still in the original game (1993)

The same scene rendered in real-time 3D in realMyst (2000)

The same scene remade using the Unity engine in realMyst: Masterpiece Edition 2.0 (2015)

The same scene remade using Unreal Engine in the VR remake (2021)

Myst's success led to the game being ported to multiple platforms. Versions for the Sega Saturn, Sony PlayStation, Atari Jaguar CD, AmigaOS, CD-i and 3DO consoles were released. A version for the Sega CD was developed and previewed by Sunsoft, but ultimately did not ship. A remaster, Myst: Masterpiece Edition, was released in 1999. It features several improvements over the original game: the images are re-rendered in 24-bit truecolor instead of the original Myst's 256 colors (8-bit); the score was remastered, and sound effects were enhanced. A 2023 fan effort "demade" the game for the Atari 2600.

A complete remake of Myst, RealMyst: Interactive 3D Edition, was developed by Cyan and Sunsoft and published by Ubisoft in November 2000 for Windows PCs, and in January 2002 for Mac. Unlike the original game, the gameplay of realMyst features free-roaming, real-time 3D graphics. Weather effects and a day/night cycle were added to the Ages alongside minor additions to keep the game's story in sync with later entries. The game also added a new Age called Rime, which is featured in an extended ending. While the new interactivity of the game was praised, realMyst ran poorly on most computers of the time. At release, Cyan described the remake as the game they would have originally made, had it not been for previous technology constraints. Robyn Miller later expressed frustration with realMyst and its marketing, saying that it was not how they had originally envisioned Myst.

In 2014, Cyan released a new visually enhanced revision of the game running on the Unity engine, realMyst: Masterpiece Edition. The remake was updated to version 2.0 on January 28, 2015, receiving a significant graphical overhaul in which several bugs were fixed and the detail of many models and textures was upgraded.

Handheld and mobile ports include a remake of Myst for the PlayStation Portable, first released in Japan in 2006. The remake included the Rime Age from realMyst, and higher-resolution widescreen visuals. Similar versions for the Nintendo DS and Nintendo 3DS were released in 2007 and 2012, respectively. Cyan and Mean Hamster Software released Myst for the Microsoft Windows Mobile platform in 2005; Riven was ported shortly after. In August 2008, Cyan announced that the company was developing a version of Myst for Apple's iOS. The game was made available to download from the iTunes App Store on May 2, 2009. The original download size was 727 MB, which was considered very large by iPhone standards. An updated version of realMyst was released for iPad 2 and above, with improved graphics over the original PC release, on June 14, 2012. A version for Android devices based on the realMyst version was released on January 26, 2017, produced and published by Noodlecake, and a port for Riven was released on April 26, 2017. realMyst: Masterpiece Edition was released for the Nintendo Switch on May 21, 2020.

=== 3D remake for virtual reality and other platforms ===
Cyan announced a new remake of Myst for high-definition screens and virtual reality, with the game's worlds fully created in free-roam 3D environments, using Unreal Engine 4, along with features like puzzle randomization, in September 2020. Myst for the Oculus Quest and Oculus Quest 2 was released on December 10, 2020; on August 26, 2021, for Windows, macOS, Xbox Series X/S and Xbox One; on February 9, 2023 for iOS; and on May 19, 2026 for PlayStation 5 and PlayStation VR2.

An update to include the world of Rime was added to this version of Myst in March 2025.

== Reception ==
Reception

Aggregate scores
Aggregator	Score
GameRankings	PC: 83% DS: 45% iOS: 88% PSP: 60%
Metacritic	DS: 43/100; PSP: 69/100; 3DS: 23/100

Review scores
Publication	Score
Adventure Gamers	4/5
Edge	6/10
Electronic Gaming Monthly	3DO: 5.75/10
Famitsu	PS: 29/40
GameSpot	PC: 8.9/10; PS: 6.3/10
Next Generation	3DO/PS: 2/5; SAT: 3/5
Nintendo Life	3DS: 1/10
Pocket Gamer	3DS: 3/10
Maximum	SAT/PS: 2/5

Myst was generally praised by critics. Computer Gaming World assured its readers that the game was not like other CD-ROM games that were "high on glitz and low on substance ... Myst is everything it's touted to be and is, quite simply, the best [Macintosh] CD-ROM game." It praised the game's open-world nature, lack of player death, and "straightforward and simple" storyline. The magazine stated that the "mesmerizing" and "stunning" graphics and sound were "not the star of the show ... the substance of the game is every bit as good as its packaging", and concluded that Myst "is bound to set a new standard". In April 1994, the magazine called it an "artistic masterwork". Jeff Koke reviewed Myst in Pyramid #8 (July/August 1994), and stated: "It is the first adventure game in which I left feeling as though I had visited a real place."

Wired and The New York Times were among the publications that pointed to Myst as evidence that video games could, in fact, evolve into an art form. Entertainment Weekly reported that some players considered Myst's "virtual morality" a religious experience. Aarhus University professor Søren Pold pointed to Myst as an excellent example of how stories can be told using objects rather than people. Laura Evenson, writing for the San Francisco Chronicle, pointed to adult-oriented games like Myst as evidence the video game industry was emerging from its "adolescent" phase.

GameSpot's Jeff Sengstack wrote that "Myst is an immersive experience that draws you in and won't let you go." Writing about Myst's reception, Greg M. Smith noted that Myst had become a hit and was regarded as incredibly immersive despite most closely resembling "the hoary technology of the slideshow (with accompanying music and effects)". Smith concluded that "Myst's primary brilliance lies in the way it provides narrative justification for the very things that are most annoying" about the technological constraints imposed on the game; for instance, Macworld praised Myst's designers for overcoming the occasionally debilitating slowness of CD drives to deliver a consistent experience throughout the game. The publication went on to declare Myst the best game of 1994, stating that Myst removed the "most annoying parts of adventure games—vocabularies that [you] don't understand, people you can't talk to, wrong moves that get you killed and make you start over. You try to unravel the enigma of the island by exploring the island, but there's no time pressure to distract you, no arbitrary punishments put in your way".

Some aspects of the game still received criticism. Several publications did not agree with the positive reception of the story. Jeremy Parish of 1UP.com noted that while its lack of interaction and continual plot suited the game, Myst contributed to a decline in the adventure game genre. Edge stated the main flaw with the game was that the game engine was nowhere near as sophisticated as the graphics. Heidi Fournier of Adventure Gamers noted a few critics complained about the difficulty and lack of context of the puzzles, while others believed these elements added to the gameplay. Similarly, critics were split on whether the lack of a plot the player could actually change was a good or bad element. In 1996 Next Generation called Myst "gaming's bleakest hour", saying the static graphics and purely trial-and-error puzzles epitomized poor game design. The magazine said its commercial success, which they owed chiefly to its popularity among non-gamers as a CD-ROM showcase, had led to many other games emulating its negative aspects. In a 2000 retrospective review, IGN declared that Myst had not aged well and that playing it "was like watching hit TV shows from the 70s. 'People watched that?,' you wonder in horror."

Myst was named Best Adventure/Fantasy Role-Playing Game at the 1994 Codie awards, and received an honorable mention in Electronic Entertainment's 1993 "Breakthrough Game" category, which ultimately went to The 7th Guest. That magazine's editors wrote, "One of the best-looking, best-sounding games ever, the Macintosh version of Myst sets new standards for the effective use of CD-ROM." Myst was also a runner-up for Computer Gaming World's 1993 "Adventure Game of the Year" award, but lost to Gabriel Knight: Sins of the Fathers and Day of the Tentacle (tie). In 1996, the magazine ranked Myst 11th on its list of the most innovative computer games.

Reviews for the game's console ports generally reflected each critic's attitude towards the original game, as critics agreed that the ports for 3DO, Saturn, and PlayStation are virtually identical to the PC original. For example, Sushi-X of Electronic Gaming Monthly gave the 3DO version a five out of ten, remarking: "The graphics and sounds are decent but the game never really appealed to me on the PC", while his co-reviewer Danyon Carpenter gave it a seven out of ten and assessed that "This game was all the rage when it debuted on the PC, and that excitement should follow through on the 3DO." In one of the more enthusiastic reviews for Myst, GamePro gave the 3DO version a perfect five out of five in all four categories (graphics, sound, control and fun factor), concluding: "Beautiful and enchanting, Myst will thrill you and make you think at the same time." The Jaguar CD version was largely ignored by reviewers, but GamePro commented that apart from the Jaguar CD's lack of a mouse peripheral and occasionally longer load times, this version too is identical to the PC original.

However, the 3DS version received negative reviews even from critics who felt that Myst's popularity was merited, citing graphics and audio well below the 3DS's capabilities and the use of awkward circle pad controls in lieu of the 3DS's touchscreen.

=== Legacy ===
Myst's success was due to its wide audience appeal, high-fidelity imagery combined with low system requirements, and the number of platforms it appeared on. It showed that games focused on puzzles instead of action could be major hits. Myst's popularity baffled some, who wondered how a game that was seen as "little more than 'an interactive slide show'" turned out to be a hit. As early as December 1994, Newsweek compared Myst to "an art film, destined to gather critical acclaim and then dust on the shelves". Others criticized Myst as the "ultimate anti-arcade game", as it was much more relaxed and casual than other games—the game required no special skills and there was no score or time limit. Myst was described by Stephen Kline and his coauthors as the "anti-Doom"; where Doom was violent, Satanic and focused on shock value and speed, Myst was tranquil and created by Christian developers.

In the wake of Myst's sales, other developers sought to capitalize on comparing their games to Myst, or released "Myst clones" that sought to replicate its success. Some developers of adventure games concurrent to Myst's release were critical of the game due to the number of subsequent titles that copied Myst's style. As the adventure game genre faced a downturn, Gamecenter and others laid the blame squarely on Myst:

People wanted eye candy, not real storytelling. Never mind the fact that Myst had the worst ending in gaming history; never mind the fact that Myst's idea of interactivity involved sparse clicks followed by hours of skull scratching. True adventure games came—Grim Fandango, Blade Runner, Gabriel Knight 3—and they failed to get sales.

In comparison, game designer Josh Mandel said the responsibility belonged to game publishers, who now expected every adventure game to be a Myst-caliber hit. Edge, writing in 1998, declared the game's impact mixed, but one that ultimately did more good to the industry than harm, writing that it helped develop PC-based gaming.

Myst helped create a new way of thinking about presentation in video games due to the nature of the CD-ROM: whereas most games before could be viewed as "games of emergence", in which game elements combined in novel and surprising ways to the player, Myst demonstrated one of the first "games of progression" where the player is guided through predefined sets of encounters. This helped to provide alternative experiences atypical of usual video games, and helped lay the foundations of more experimental indie video games developed in the 2000s. The game served as a precursor to casual games, which typically do not require players to act quickly, as well as an early predecessor to the walking simulators that allow players to explore at their own pace. Cyan's sequels to Myst also indirectly served to popularize escape the room games, which provide similar puzzle-solving experiences but in a much more confined space.

Myst became a cultural touchstone of the day; the game was so popular the Miller brothers appeared in advertisements for The Gap. Actor Matt Damon wanted The Bourne Conspiracy video game to be a puzzle game like Myst, refusing to lend his voice talent to the game when it was turned into a shooter instead. Myst has also been used for educational and scientific purposes; Becta recognized a primary school teacher, Tim Rylands, who had made literacy gains using Myst as a teaching tool, and researchers have used the game for studies examining the effect of video games on aggression. A parody computer game, Pyst, was released in 1996; the game is a satirical free-roaming of Myst Island which had apparently been vandalized by frustrated visitors. Myst was added to the collection of video games of the Museum of Modern Art in 2013, where it is displayed as a video presentation.

Myst's success sparked a multimedia franchise. Riven was released in 1997 and continues Myst's storyline. Presto Studios and Ubisoft developed and published Myst III: Exile in 2001, Myst IV: Revelation was developed and published entirely by Ubisoft and released in 2004. The latest game in the franchise is Myst V: End of Ages, developed by Cyan Worlds and released in 2005. In addition to the main games, Cyan developed Uru: Ages Beyond Myst. The multiplayer component of Uru was initially canceled, but GameTap eventually revived it as Myst Online: Uru Live. After Uru Live was cancelled, the game was released as an open source title. The Miller brothers collaborated with David Wingrove to produce several novels based on the Myst universe, which were published by Hyperion. The novels, entitled Myst: The Book of Atrus, Myst: The Book of Ti'ana and Myst: The Book of D'ni, fill in the games' backstory and were packaged together as The Myst Reader. By 2003, the Myst franchise had sold over twelve million copies worldwide, with Myst representing more than six million copies in the figure. Multiple attempts have been made to adapt the games and series into television series and feature films.

== See also ==
- Choose-your-own-adventure and gamebook—Books that allow the reader to choose a narrative line
