= Riven =

1997 video game

Riven: The Sequel to Myst
- The PC box art for Riven showcases Richard Vander Wende's concept of what players would first see on the Age of Tay.
- Developer: Cyan Productions (Note: PlayStation and Saturn versions developed by Sunsoft)
- Publisher: Red Orb Entertainment: PlayStation Acclaim Entertainment Saturn Sega Pocket PC Mean Hamster Software Android Noodlecake Studios
- Directors: Robyn Miller; Richard Vander Wende
- Producer: Rand Miller
- Designers: Robyn Miller; Richard Vander Wende
- Programmer: Richard A. Watson
- Composer: Robyn Miller
- Series: Myst
- Platforms: Mac OS, Windows, PlayStation, Sega Saturn, Pocket PC, iOS, Android
- Release: October 31, 1997: MacOS, Windows; WW: October 31, 1997 PlayStation; NA: December 22, 1997; EU: February 1998 Saturn; EU: June 5, 1998 Pocket PC; NA: December 20, 2005 iOS; WW: January 12, 2011 Android; WW: April 26, 2017
- Genre: Graphic adventure
- Mode: Single-player

Riven: The Sequel to Myst is a 1997 adventure game developed by Cyan Productions and published by Red Orb Entertainment for Mac OS and Microsoft Windows. It is the sequel to 1993's Myst, and the second installment of the Myst series. The game's story is set after the events of its predecessor; having rescued Atrus, who had been trapped by his sons, the player character is enlisted by him to free his wife from his power-hungry father, Gehn. Riven takes place almost entirely on the Age of Riven, a world slowly falling apart due to Gehn's destructive rule.

Development of Riven began soon after Myst became a success, and spanned more than three years. In an effort to create a visual style distinct from that of Myst, director Robyn Miller and his brother, producer Rand Miller, recruited production designer Richard Vander Wende as a co-director. Broderbund employed a multi-million dollar advertising campaign to publicize the game's release. Riven received ports to the PlayStation, Sega Saturn, Pocket PC, iOS and Android.

Riven was praised by reviewers, with the magazine Salon proclaiming that the game approaches the level of art. Critics positively noted the puzzles and immersive experience of the gameplay, though publications such as Edge felt that the nature of point-and-click gameplay limited the title heavily. The best-selling game of 1997, Riven sold 1.5 million copies in one year. After the game's release, Robyn Miller left Cyan to form his own development studio, ending the professional partnership of the two brothers. Rand stayed at Cyan and continued to work on Myst-related products including The Myst Reader and the real-time rendered game Uru: Ages Beyond Myst. The next entry in the Myst series, Myst III: Exile, was developed by Presto Studios and published by Ubisoft. A remake of the game, recreating the world in fully explorable 3D and supporting virtual reality, was released in June 2024.

== Gameplay ==
A screenshot of Riven, showing the prison island where the non-player character Catherine is held captive

Like its predecessor, Riven is a point and click adventure game played from a first-person perspective. The player explores immersive environments depicted through a large series of computer generated stills using mouse clicks for movement or to manipulate objects within reach. By operating mechanical contraptions and deciphering codes and symbols discovered in the surroundings, the vaguely explained goal can eventually be reached.

To navigate the world, the player clicks in the direction they want to walk or turn. The cursor changes in appearance, depending on its position on the screen and what it is hovering over, to show what effect clicking will have. For instance, if the player positions the cursor hand near the side of the screen, it may show a pointing finger, indicating that clicking will turn the view in that direction. The cursor changes in context to show when players can drag or toggle switches, or when certain items can be picked up and carried. Such items can then be examined at any time, and either reveal clues to puzzles or provide information on the game's setting and story. Like Myst, Riven has an optional method of navigation known as Zip Mode, which allows players to skip to areas already explored, but may cause them to miss important clues.

Riven has more complex and numerous puzzles than its forerunner and is set in a larger virtual world for players to explore. Whereas in Myst the objective of the game is to travel to different Ages to solve puzzles before returning to a "hub Age", Riven's gameplay takes place on the five islands of the Age of Riven. Much of it consists of solving puzzles to access new areas of the islands, though players are also able to explore without fulfilling objectives. The volcanic landscape depicted, with its steep cliffs and crater lakes, is bestrewn with mechanical, Victorian-style artifacts such as elevators, pipes, levers and roller coaster-like transports. To solve the game, players must consider the purpose and physical principles of these artifacts as well as their role in the fictional culture.

== Plot ==
Riven's story continues where Myst and its companion novel, The Book of Atrus, left off. Atrus knows the ancient art of creating "linking books", specially written books that serve as portals to other worlds known as "Ages". Atrus needs the player's help to free his wife, Catherine, who is held hostage in her home Age of Riven, which is slowly collapsing. Her captor is Gehn, Atrus's manipulative father and self-declared ruler of Riven. Thirty years earlier, Atrus and Catherine trapped Gehn on Riven by removing all of the linking books that led out of the Age. The final book they escaped from Riven with, leading to the Age of Myst, fell into the Star Fissure, a rift leading out of the damaged Age of Riven into a mysterious, space-like void. The linking book was not destroyed but was instead found by the player, leading to the events of Myst. Catherine was later tricked into returning to Riven by her sons, Sirrus and Achenar, whereupon she was taken hostage by Gehn.

At the beginning of Riven, Atrus equips the player with a trap book—a snare that functions as a one-man prison, yet looks identical to a linking book—and his personal diary summarizing the events leading to the present situation. Atrus cannot explain in depth as he is engaged in rewriting the descriptive book of Riven, in an attempt to slow its deterioration. The player must enter Riven with no way of leaving, as Atrus cannot risk sending a real linking book to Riven until Gehn is safely imprisoned, lest he use it to escape. With the instructions of trapping Gehn, freeing Catherine, and signaling Atrus, the player links to Riven.

Once there, the player travels across the islands of Riven, encountering Catherine, Gehn, and the Moeity, rebels fighting against Gehn's rule. Because of the decay of Riven's structure, the only way to clearly signal Atrus is to further destabilize the Age—accomplished by reopening the Star Fissure, which Gehn had closed. When it is opened, Atrus links to Riven to investigate, and meets the player at the brink of the fissure. Depending on the player's actions, the ending to Riven varies. In the best (and canonical) ending, the player tricks Gehn into the prison book and releases Catherine, who helps the Rivenese people evacuate to another Age. Atrus and Catherine thank the player before linking back to Myst. The player then falls into the Star Fissure to be taken back to their world. The worst ending involves signaling Atrus without either capturing Gehn or releasing Catherine, which allows Gehn to kill Atrus and the player, then take Atrus's linking book to Myst, leaving the Rivenese people to die in the rapidly collapsing Age as he escapes. Other endings include capturing Gehn without saving Catherine, being trapped in the prison book, or being killed by Gehn after angering him.

== Development ==
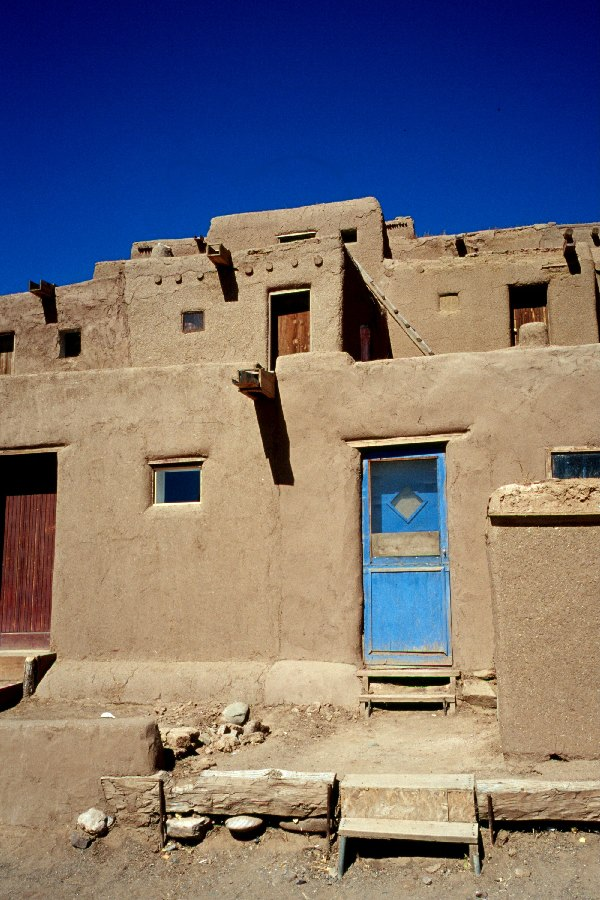
Taos Pueblo, a Native American settlement near Santa Fe. The artists spent a day at a pueblo in Santa Fe, gathering textures for the game.

Cyan Productions began work on Riven in 1993, after Myst's release. Before development began, when the name of the game was undecided, the brothers Robyn and Rand Miller said they wanted a "natural flow" from the first game to the sequel. As Myst proved to be a popular and commercial success, the two developers were able to expand their four-person team to a much larger crew of designers, artists, programmers, and sound designers. Development spanned more than four years, and was a much larger undertaking than for the first game; Riven had a budget of between US$5 and $10 million, more than ten times the cost of developing Myst.

The design for Riven stemmed from a desire to create something different and more dynamic than the romantic style of Myst. At an early point, the game's world was to be called Equiquay. The first stage of development was to create the puzzles, in an attempt to integrate them as smoothly as possible into the areas in the game. The Millers met their co-designer, Richard Vander Wende, at a demonstration of Myst for the Digital World Expo in Los Angeles. Vander Wende had previously worked for ILM, and at Walt Disney Feature Animation as a designer for the animated feature Aladdin. As the third member of Riven's conceptual team, Vander Wende ended up contributing what Robyn Miller described as an "edgier" and complementary vision, that made the game dramatically different from its predecessor.

=== Graphics ===
As in Myst, the topography of the islands was originally created as grayscale images, where brightness corresponded to elevation. In Softimage, these maps were turned into the terrain models seen in the game. The large island objects were broken apart to facilitate efficient rendering, which required them to be created using polygonal geometry. All other objects were modeled using B-splines and NURBS.

Many of the textures were accumulated during a three-day trip to Santa Fe, New Mexico. The artists took hundreds of photos of wood, adobe, sand, stucco and other materials, which were treated in Photoshop before being mapped onto the 3D geometry. Whereas many computer-generated environments of the time ended up looking smooth, like plastic, the Millers and Vander Wende developed a more gritty and weathered design, with corroded and aged elements, to imply reality. The artists considered how objects would look and function if they were real, where and how they would be worn, and created corresponding details. While bump maps were occasionally used to simulate geometry, even small details such as screws were often individually modeled.

Rendering was executed in Mental Ray, using numerous custom-made shaders—created by CG technical director Karl Stiefvater—to produce lifelike lighting, water and landscapes. Wireframes also served as a guide to model the backgrounds. In total Riven has over three hours of video and almost five thousand images; rendering was a major bottleneck in production despite the use of 18 dedicated workstations. Some scenes consisted of tens of thousands of individual models and textures and more than a hundred virtual light sources. Loading a single island model could take two hours. Runtime animation effects were created by Mark DeForest, to add flying insects and simple water ripples.

Riven combined the pre-rendered backgrounds with live action footage, in order to increase the player's immersion level. Riven was the first game in which any of its designers had directed live actors, and Vander Wende was apprehensive about their use. Rand Miller had to reprise his role of Atrus from Myst, even though he hated acting. All the actors were filmed with a blue screen as a backdrop, which was removed in post-production by chroma key, so that the actors would blend into the virtual environment. Real world stairs, doorways and studio lights had to be meticulously positioned on the live stage to match their CG equivalents. Some sequences were seamlessly cut together with morphing, to allow for partial variations due to the nonlinearity of the gameplay.

=== Audio ===
Robyn Miller composed Riven's music, which was later packaged and released by Virgin Records as Riven: The Soundtrack. Miller designed the liner notes and packaging, which included English translations of the language found in the game. Whereas the music to Myst was, at first, only available by mail-order from Cyan, Virgin Records had bought the rights to release it initially, prompting Miller to make sure that it could stand alone in CD form. The compact disc was released on February 24, 1998, with 54 minutes of music.

Miller established three leitmotifs for the game's three central characters, Atrus, Catherine, and Gehn. Gehn's theme is only heard in its complete form near the end of the game, but portions of the melody can be heard throughout Riven, highlighting his control of the Age. Miller tried to let the environment dictate the resulting sound in order to make the music as immersive as possible. He blended live instrumentation with synthesizers: "By mixing and matching conventional instrumentation, you can create an odd, interesting mood," Miller said. Ultimately, he wanted the music of Riven to reflect the game itself, which he described as having "a familiar-yet-strange feel to it."

Miller described his biggest challenge in writing Riven's music as reconciling the linear, pleasing construction of music with the nonlinearity of the gameplay. As players can freely explore all areas, Miller explained in an interview, "the music can't say anything too specific. If it says something, if it builds in intensity and there starts to be a climax, and people are just standing in a room looking around, and they're thinking 'What's going on in here? Is something about to jump out from behind me?' You can't have the basic parts of music that you'd like to have, you can't have a basic structure. It's all got to be just flowing, and continue to flow." Allmusic critic Stephen Thomas Erlewine argued that the soundtrack is "appealingly atmospheric", but "lacks definition", and that the music loses impact when separated from the game.

== Release ==
At the time of Riven's development, original publisher Broderbund was facing falling revenues as development costs rose. Two years into the project, Cyan Productions still could not develop the game into a testable state. Broderbund's stock dropped from $60 a share to $22 in 1996, because of Riven's delay from the original planned holiday 1996 window. Riven was released in North America and the United Kingdom to retail on October 31, 1997 by Red Orb Entertainment, a publisher brand of Broderbund. While Riven's sales were expected to be higher than any other computer game that holiday season, Broderbund launched a $5-10 million marketing campaign, and developed a retail marketing partnership with Toshiba America. Anticipation for the game was high even among non-gamers, helped by web-based word of mouth and well-placed media coverage.

Sunsoft, who previously developed and published Myst for the Sega Saturn, were initially set to publish the Saturn version of Riven in PAL regions, but the rights were later picked up by Acclaim Entertainment. A potential conversion of Riven to the Atari Jaguar never materialized.

The game initially shipped on five compact discs. A version of the game that shipped on a single DVD was released in 1998.

PC Data reported it as the best-selling computer game in the United States during 1997, despite its having only been on the market for less than three months. Myst or Riven held the number one and two spots on the PC Data sales charts from June 1997 until January 1998. By April, Riven had sold over 1 million units and earned $46.2 million in revenue domestically, which led PC Data to declare it the fifth-best-selling computer game in the United States between January 1993 and April 1998. Sales surpassed 1.5 million units within a year of its release. By 2001, over 4.5 million units had been sold. Acclaim Entertainment cited Riven as one of their best-selling PlayStation releases up to that time.

== Reception ==
Reception

Aggregate scores
| Aggregator | Score |
|---|---|
| GameRankings | 85% (PC); 73% (PS) |
| Metacritic | 83/100 (PC); 82/100 (iOS) |

Review scores
| Publication | Score |
|---|---|
| Adventure Gamers | 4.5/5 |
| Edge | 7/10 |
| Electronic Gaming Monthly | 7/10, 7.5/10, 6/10, 7/10 (PS) |
| Famitsu | 7/10, 5/10, 7/10, 6/10 (PS) |
| GameRevolution | A |
| GameSpot | 7.8/10 (PC); 5.5/10 (PS) |
| Next Generation | 3/5 (PC) |
| Macworld | 4.5/5 |

Riven was generally positively received by critics, with the PC version garnering an average critic score of 83/100 at Metacritic. Jeff Segstack of GameSpot gave the game high marks, explaining that it is "a leisurely paced, all-encompassing, mentally challenging experience. If you enjoyed Myst, you'll thoroughly enjoy Riven." Computer Gaming World stated that the graphics were the best they had seen in any adventure game. GamePro said that it "retains the ambiance of Myst, but new features, such as increased use of animation and live action footage, create even more believable environments." The reviewer gave it a 4.5 out of 5 in graphics and a perfect 5.0 in every other category (sound, control, and funfactor), and predicted that it would both surpass the expectations of Myst fans and draw in many new enthusiasts to the series. Laura Miller of Salon declared that "Art [...] is what Riven approaches," and praised the gameplay as having "a graceful elegance that reminds [her] of a masterfully constructed novel." The game's sound and graphics were consistently praised. Macworld's Michael Gowan highlighted the game's "rich, engrossingly mysterious world", and he argued that the quality of its storytelling made Riven "more like a good novel than a computer game."

Nevertheless, several publications found fault with aspects of Riven. Computer Gaming World felt that the gameplay was too similar to the original Myst, making Riven the "same game with a new title"; the magazine also criticized the minimal character interaction. Gaming magazine Edge felt that although Riven was a good game, the solitary atmosphere and lack of mobility was steadily becoming outdated, as games like Super Mario 64 sacrificed graphical fidelity for an increase in freedom. They stated "the question is whether Cyan can incorporate its almost Tolkien-esque world-building skills into a more cutting-edge game vehicle next time." Even long-time players of the Myst games, such as Heidi Fournier of Adventure Gamers, felt that a few puzzles were too difficult; Computer and Video Games, meanwhile, believed that the story clues were too symbolic and scant, which made following the plot difficult. Next Generation commended Riven for being highly accessible to the general public rather than just experienced gamers, but also said the puzzles, while an improvement over those of Myst, were still not well-integrated into the story, making them feel like arbitrary obstacles to progress.

Electronic Gaming Monthly (EGM) and GamePro both positively reviewed the PlayStation port, remarking that Riven is very specific to the player's taste, with a slow pace, intricate plot, vast size, and often frustrating set of puzzles that would likely infuriate traditional action gamers but engross the more patient player. Kelly Rickards and Shawn Smith of EGM argued that while the game is superficially very similar to Myst, subtle elements such as the greater amount of interaction and better puzzle design make it more appealing, and that anyone with an open mind should give it a try. GamePro gave it the same scores as the PC version, excepting only that the graphics category dropped to a 4.0 out of 5. John Broady of GameSpot, however, said that while the developers had done the best they could with converting the game, the limitations of the PlayStation made it fall far short of the PC original, with dithered scenery, muddy video sequences, and long load times. He concluded that "Playing Riven on the PlayStation is sort of like watching Star Wars on a 13″ TV; you'll get the point but you're definitely missing something."

Despite the success of the game, the Miller brothers eventually pursued other projects. Robyn Miller said: "I think it would be a detriment to always, for the rest of our lives, be creating Myst-like projects. [...] We're going to change, evolve and grow, just like any person does in any manner." Robyn would leave Cyan to form a new development company called Land of Point; Vander Wende would also leave to pursue other projects. The next video game entry in the Myst franchise would be 2001's Myst III: Exile, which was not developed by Cyan nor published by Broderbund. Presto Studios took over development; Ubisoft acquired Broderbund's entertainment library from The Learning Company (formerly SoftKey) and published the Myst sequels.

The reviewer from Pyramid #29 (Jan./Feb., 1998) stated that "Myst, and now Riven, are worlds to be explored, with complex puzzles to be solved, and without time limitations or enemies to worry about. Take all the time you like; the basic problems of the game will still be there, waiting for you to solve them."

At the Academy of Interactive Arts & Sciences' inaugural Interactive Achievement Awards, Riven won the award for "Outstanding Achievement in Art/Graphics", and received nominations for "Interactive Title of the Year", as well as console and personal computer genre awards for "Adventure Game of the Year".

== Remake ==
Cyan announced plans to release a remake of Riven on the game's 25th anniversary on October 31, 2022. Like the 3D remake of Myst, this version of Riven features fully explorable 3D environments. Cyan had attempted to use the original Riven's models but found they were too low-resolution, instead recreating the world using Unreal Engine 5. They reached out to The Starry Expanse project, a fan-driven effort to recreate Riven, about a year prior to the announcement, working out a deal to work with members of that team to use their efforts within the remake of Riven. The few cases where characters were shown through full-motion video from the original game were remade using computer-generated characters coupled with motion capture, as the original video quality was poor and did not include full-screen shots of the characters. While Miller reprised the voice of Atrus in new audio, the game uses the original audio performance by John Keston, who had died in 2022, using an actor to recapture his mannerisms for Gehn. While the islands of Riven are recreated faithfully with respect to the original game, some of the placements used for point-and-click movement did not work for a fully 3D traversable landscape, and were repositioned to work better. Some puzzles feature random solutions that change on starting a new game, making it impossible to jump ahead with prior knowledge of Riven's solutions, while other puzzles were completely reworked to be less difficult for new players to the game.

The game was released on June 25, 2024 for Windows, macOS, and Meta Quest platforms and on May 19, 2026 for PlayStation 5 and PlayStation VR2. The remake received "generally favorable" reviews according to Metacritic, with an aggregate score of 86/100 from 32 reviews. The Academy of Interactive Arts & Sciences nominated the Riven remake for "Outstanding Achievement in Game Direction" at the 28th Annual D.I.C.E. Awards.
