= King's Quest: Mask of Eternity =

1998 video game

- Developer: Sierra Studios
- Publisher: Sierra Studios
- Director: Mark Seibert
- Producer: Craig Alexander
- Designers: Mark Seibert; Roberta Williams
- Artist: Jason Piel
- Writer: Roberta Williams
- Composers: Ben Houge; Kevin Manthei; Mark Seibert
- Series: King's Quest
- Platform: Microsoft Windows
- Release: NA: November 24, 1998; EU: 1998
- Genre: Action-adventure game
- Mode: Single-player

King's Quest: Mask of Eternity (also known as King's Quest VIII: Mask of Eternity) is a hybrid point-and-click adventure and action-adventure video game developed and published by Sierra Studios in 1998. It was the eighth official game in the King's Quest series. Further, it is the first (and only) game in the main series where the main character is neither King Graham nor a member of his family, as well as the first in the series to use a full 3D engine as opposed to the 2D cartoon or pixel style of the earlier games and the first to omit the sequel numbering system on box artwork and title screen. The game received many favorable reviews and was nominated for several computer gaming awards, receiving the award for Outstanding Technical Achievement from RPG Vault and the Adventure Game of the Year award from Digital Entertainment On-line.

== Gameplay ==
The game combines a point-and-click single multipurpose context-sensitive cursor from King's Quest VII, and a variation of the standard adventure game item inventory along the top. It also includes information about total mask pieces collected and total gold coins. A menu along the bottom of the screen includes information concerning level, character experience, curative items, potions offering different abilities, the two current weapons, and armor. On the right side of the menu is the interface for the grappling hook item and rocks.

The cursor is dynamic, and can change into four different types depending on actions. The primary cursor is the Play Cursor, which functions much like the cursor in King's Quest VII. It is used to look, take, talk and do. Like in King's Quest VII, picking up an item from inventory switches the game to an Inventory Cursor. This cursor shows an image of the item picked up, and allows the player to click it on something else. Next is the Sword Cursor, much like the one seen at the end of King's Quest VI (during the Alhazred sword battle). It is used for combat in the game. The final cursor is the Arrow Cursor, which lets the player click on enemies from a distance, and fire projectiles.

The game was designed primarily to be played in third person mode, but also offers a first person mode. The first person mode was primarily put into the game to allow players to better look around or get closeups of things the screen. But it can be used to play the game, except during character interactions. There are three difficulty levels for combat (Easy, Normal, and Hard).

== Plot ==
=== Story ===
The story begins in Castle Daventry with King Graham and his minister talking about the everyday affairs of running the country when the Magic Mirror activates in front of them, showing them a bad omen. They witness Lucreto, the Archarchon of the Realm of the Sun, destroy the Mask of Eternity, releasing a wave of energy. The mirror goes on to show the kingdom's only hope, the lowly peasant and knight from a nearby village, Connor of Daventry. He is shown chatting with his neighbor Sarah when a storm arises and a piece of the mask falls at his feet. He picks it up, then turns around to find that Sarah has been turned to stone. The unleashed magic energy has turned all other mortals in the world to stone, including King Graham, with the Mask piece apparently shielding Connor from sharing this fate. With that the Mirror ends its vision.

Early in the game, the half-stone wizard that Connor encounters tells him about the Mask of Eternity and Connor's destiny. The wizard conjures for him a magic map that shows all explored areas and allows Connor to teleport between lands once the teleportation sites in each land (except for the Realm of the Sun) have been discovered. With knowledge of his Quest, Connor makes his way to Castle Daventry to check on his liege and the royal family, finding Graham and the rest of the inhabitants of the castle turned to stone. He vows that he will save King Graham, Queen Valanice, their family, and the rest of the inhabitants of Daventry, or die trying.

Connor escapes Daventry through the Realm of Death, where he learns about the resting place of the Mask of Eternity, the Realm of the Sun. He journeys across several realms, helping their denizens against the forces of darkness. Connor vanquishes several powerful beasts such as the Swamp Witch, the Dragon Wyrm, and even a Two-Headed Dragon. While recovering a mask piece from the Barren Region, he learns the name of Lucreto from one of his henchmen. Eventually, Connor reaches Paradise Lost and transports into the Realm of the Sun. From there, he fights his way to the Mask's altar room, and confronts the fallen archarchon. He defeats Lucreto by putting the mask pieces together and pushing him into the void portal.

The game ends with Connor rising to the top of the Realm of the Sun with the restored Mask. A beam of blue light shines on the Mask, seeming to restore its power and it sends out a wave of energy that restores everything including the Kingdom of Daventry to life. Sarah is restored. King Graham, newly restored, looks on proudly at his hero in the Magic Mirror. The game ends with the Archons being released from their stone prisons and joining Connor who triumphantly lifts his sword into the air.

=== Characters ===
- Connor: A lowly tanner, painter and knight of Daventry (much like the young Sir Graham in King's Quest I: Quest for the Crown). Though not of noble birth, he rises above his lowly status to save his kingdom and the world, becoming a great hero. Connor is the subject of several ancient prophecies concerning saving the world. Over the course of the adventure he earns many titles based on his fulfillment of prophecy and/or deeds. Connor begins his adventure wearing a short brown tunic, green pants, a belt, and high boots. He quickly upgrades to various suits of armor, until he obtains the Armor of Light (inspired by the biblical Armor of God). With the armor, the Sword and Shield of Truth, and the immortality granted by the Chalice of Order (inspired by the Holy Grail), Connor is able to overcome the powers of the evil Lucreto and banish him to the Abyss.
- Lucreto: Before his decline into evil, he was the head of the Archons. As the Archarchon, Lucreto was charged with protecting the Mask of Eternity, the Global Icon of Truth, Light, and Order. Through use of dark and powerful magics, he shattered the Mask. Its pieces were scattered throughout different parts of the world. As a result, Chaos reigned, and creatures of darkness were allowed to roam free in the world. Lucreto is defeated in battle with the hero Connor, whom the Mask has deemed its Champion Eternal, and is plunged into a magic portal. It is stated in the game that because he is an immortal Archon, Lucreto cannot be killed, and that pushing him through the portal to the black Abyss is the only way to vanquish him forever. Lucreto is given several titles based on his role in the prophecy. For example, he is "The Father" of demons and abominations. Lucreto's character and backstory is inspired by the story of Lucifer.
- Graham: The king of Daventry, and one of its great heroes in past years (and past games). He is now older, and is concerned with the Kingdom's day-to-day affairs such as making sure there is a surplus of grain in the silos. He and his minister witness the cataclysm through the Magic Mirror and see a vision of Connor, their only hope, but are quickly turned to stone by the release of magic. Connor later enters Castle Daventry to check on his king. While there, Connor finds a painting of King Graham wearing his classic adventurer's cap, and moving further into the castle he finds the king and his minister's stone forms. Connor vows to rescue his king. The result of Connor's adventure involves Graham being restored along with the Kingdom of Daventry, witnessing the young hero standing triumphantly in the Temple of the Sun from the mirror.

== Development ==
Mask of Eternity went through two or three main development phases, in which Roberta Williams' ideas changed, the engine was finalized, and the graphics were finalized. In Fall 1996, Williams showed off some of her first screenshots of the game's levels, a few enemies, and the placeholder for Connor. Video showing the level development of this version of the game was included in the Roberta Williams' Anthology. There are scenes for two or three levels that were cut from the final game (including an undersea area, and a green forested area with a village). By July 1997, the game had gone into its final phase, and appeared much like it does in the final product. The first gameplay footage of this version appeared in the King's Quest Collection II. This version was not completed until December 1998.

Williams' team was forced to build the engine from an earlier version of 3Space (as Dynamix was behind schedule finishing the updated Red Baron II version of the 3Space engine for their own games). 3Space had been designed for running flight simulators, and so was inappropriate for a 3D adventure game in several respects: it could not effectively display texture-mapped terrain up close, it could not animate 3D objects, and it had no means of streaming voice clips. Modifying the engine to serve the purposes of Mask of Eternity took nearly a year. Producer Mark Seibert explained that this was necessary because 3Space was the only game engine that could run both 3D terrain and interiors, thus enabling characters inside buildings to view and interact with characters and objects that are outside the building.

Buildings and other structures were constructed with a proprietary object editor called ZED, while terrain was created with another editor, called TED.

Roberta Williams classified Mask of Eternity as either 'Adventure' or within a possible new genre, a '3D Adventure'. As a '3D Adventure' it retained a point-and-click puzzle system of traditional adventure games, but also included action-adventure elements (such as avoiding traps and rolling boulders). Williams wanted to break away from the drawn-out animations and lengthy cutscenes typical of adventure games, which lead to the player spending a great deal of their time sitting and watching. In particular, she had just finished making Phantasmagoria, which she acknowledged emphasized story at the frequent expense of interactivity, and felt compelled to create a game which went in the opposite direction. The game includes many actions and puzzles that could only be done in 3D, many based on physics, rock tossing, jumping, climbing, or 3D combat. For example, cutting down a tree to block a river from turning the wheel on a mill, or killing an enemy so that it falls and depresses a pressure plate (alternatively a rock could be used). The team decided against enabling multiple solutions to puzzles after their researches uncovered that the overwhelming majority of people who buy a given adventure game never finish it, much less replay it.

3D also allowed the team to expand on and focus on the exploration element which was one of the main highlights of previous King's Quest games. Other puzzles included the more traditional variety of point-and-click inventory-based puzzles seen in previous games of the series. This change or 'evolution' in the direction of adventure games was part of Roberta and Ken Williams' attempts to innovate the genre and prevent it from becoming stagnant and 'mediocre'.

The game's new interface was inspired by recent role-playing video games such as Daggerfall and Diablo. Williams commented that the collaboration between her and Seibert during the game's development involved balancing her particular affinity for adventure games with his particular affinity for RPGs: "I like to take something that could be a complex idea and bring out its strong points, but break it down into something that's more accessible to people. And so Mark will explain how, for example, the whole character creation system works in a lot of role-playing games, and I'll say how that sounds way too complicated and ask how we can make this more accessible. On the other hand, I'll want to put in all these adventure game elements, and he'll stop me when I start to put in something that's just more point and click. So it's really been a good back and forth kind of thing ..."

This was the second King's Quest game (after the original King's Quest: Quest for the Crown (AGI release)) to not have a numeral in the title upon initial release. But it followed a pattern in several previous Sierra games that were released without numerals but were intended to be continuations of a series. References to it being the eighth game appear in the file structure and manual, and the game was marketed as King's Quest 8 on the official website. The updated 'gamecard/boxart' for digital release lists the game as King's Quest VIII: Mask of Eternity.

== Reception ==
Reception

Aggregate score
Aggregator	Score
GameRankings	71%

Review scores
Publication	Score
Adventure Gamers	3.5/5
AllGame	2.5/5
CNET Gamecenter	9/10
Computer Games Strategy Plus	4/5
Computer Gaming World	4/5
EP Daily	7/10
GameRevolution	B
GameSpot	7.6/10
IGN	7.8/10
Next Generation	3/5
PC Accelerator	8/10
PC Gamer (US)	66%

The game received above-average reviews according to the review aggregation website GameRankings. Next Generation said, "Overall, King's Quest fans will be interested because Mask of Eternity does carry on the mythology set out in earlier games, but the switch to 3D hasn't really enhanced the basic puzzle-solving element that is the cornerstone of this and earlier titles. That may be good enough for the series' legion of fans, but it doesn't really break new ground in the adventure genre or offer anything you can't find in similar titles like Redguard."

Roberta Williams claimed in 1999 that the game was among the best selling adventures of 1998, and outsold Grim Fandango 2-to-1, and that each game in the series outsold each previous game in the series (but she also noted that she was not privy to exact sales numbers at that time due to changes in management). However, according to GameSpot, the game's sales in the United States by November 2000 were "only a fraction" of the 300,000-400,000 units sold in the region by each of its immediate predecessors. During the year 2001 alone, it sold 69,976 units in North America (this estimation did not include online sales). In 2002, Louis Castle of Westwood Studios estimated total sales of 750,000 units for the game.

The game was a finalist for Computer Gaming World's 1998 "Best Adventure" prize, which ultimately went to Grim Fandango and Sanitarium (tie). It was likewise nominated by CNET Gamecenter, GameSpot, Computer Games Strategy Plus and the Academy of Interactive Arts & Sciences (AIAS) for PC Adventure Game of the Year, but lost all of these awards to Grim Fandango. AIAS also nominated it for "Computer Entertainment Title of the Year" and "Outstanding Achievement in Character or Story Development" at the 2nd Annual Interactive Achievement Awards, but lost the awards to Half-Life and Pokémon Red and Blue, respectively. The game won RPG Vault's "Outstanding Technical Achievement" award, and earned Adventure Game of the Year at Digital Entertainment On-line.

== Legacy ==
King's Quest: Mask of Eternity inspired a 12-minute musical "sequel" suite, called Daventry Suite by Donald M. Wilson, Professor Emeritus at Bowling Green State University. The multi-movement work for wind ensemble was divided into three pieces, "Sarah's Song", "Connor's Triumphal Return to Daventry", and "Celebration with Ringing Peal". Wilson's piece was featured by Sierra On-Line as "the first musical work of extended scope to be inspired by a computer game".

Originally released in retail in 1998, the game has been digitally re-released by Activision as part of the King's Quest 7+8 pack through GOG.com (September 2010) and patched to work on Windows Vista and Windows 7. Although this release was a digital download only, it has a bug and will not run unless an optical drive is present on the computer or by using of virtual drive from Daemon Tools. A fan patch was available for retail copies of the game that would allow it to run on computers without optical drives, and it fixed several cutscene lockups (it was incompatible with the GoG release).

Director of 2015's reimagined King's Quest, Matt Korba, said Mask of Eternity is canon: "King's Quest VIII exists. We're not doing a lot with Connor – we might have a cameo fit into it – but we're focused on the core family". Ultimately, Connor did not make it into the game. However, elements of King's Quest VIII did make it into the game, including references to at least ice orcs and spriggans.
