= The X-Files Game =

1998 video game

- Developer: HyperBole Studios
- Publisher: Fox Interactive: EU: Sony Computer Entertainment (PS1)
- Director: Greg Roach
- Producer: Phil Peters
- Designer: Greg Roach
- Programmers: Pete Isensee; Melanie McClaire
- Artist: Jeanne Franz
- Writers: Richard Dowdy; Greg Roach
- Composers: Paul Wayne Hiaumet; Mark Snow
- Series: The X-Files
- Platforms: Windows; Mac OS; PlayStation
- Release: Windows: NA: June 11, 1998; EU: September 29, 1998; Mac OS: NA: June 1998; PlayStation: EU: January 9, 1999; NA: October 13, 1999
- Genres: Interactive movie, point-and-click adventure
- Mode: Single-player

The X-Files Game is a 1998 interactive film developed by HyperBole Studios and published by Fox Interactive for Windows, Mac OS and PlayStation. The game takes place somewhere within the timeline of the third season of the American television series The X-Files, following a young Seattle-based FBI agent named Craig Willmore who is assigned by Walter Skinner to investigate the disappearance of agents Fox Mulder and Dana Scully.

The game is set and was filmed in Seattle.

== Plot summary ==
The game takes place somewhere within the timeline of the third season of the American television series The X-Files. The story follows a young Seattle-based FBI agent named Craig Willmore (played by Jordan Lee Williams) who is assigned by Assistant Director Walter Skinner to investigate the disappearance of agents Fox Mulder and Dana Scully, who were last seen in the Everett, Washington area. In order to follow their trail, Agent Willmore must use a variety of tools along the way, including night vision goggles, a digital camera, PDA (an Apple Newton), and lock picks, as well as law enforcement gear such as an evidence kit, standard-issue handgun, handcuffs, and even his badge. During his assignment he is partnered with a Seattle Police Department detective named Mary Astadourian (played by Paige Witte), and a minor romantic subplot involves a relationship developing between the two.

Several of the actors from the TV series reprise their roles in the game, including David Duchovny (Mulder), Gillian Anderson (Scully), Mitch Pileggi (Skinner), Steven Williams (X), Bruce Harwood, Tom Braidwood and Dean Haglund (The Lone Gunmen) and—very briefly and depending upon the outcome of the game—William B. Davis (The Smoking Man). The TV series actors filmed their relatively brief appearances in the game just before entering production on the feature film. The game's plotline involves aliens taking over the bodies of humans and contains many references to the show's extraterrestrial mythology. During the course of the game the "present day" date of April 1996 is displayed alongside certain locations, placing this "episode" after the season three episode "Avatar" and before "Wetwired", which take place March 7 and April 27 respectively. This time is also after the first incident with the alien black oil in the episode "Piper Maru" of the third season.

The screenplay for The X-Files Game was written by Richard Dowdy, Greg Roach and Frank Spotnitz, from a story by Chris Carter and Frank Spotnitz.

== Gameplay ==
Screenshot showing Special Agent Craig Wilmore encountering X. On the bottom of the screen, the player is given three choices on how to respond to X. They consist of Angry, Curious and Distrustful.

The game uses a point-and-click interface, uses full motion video technology called Virtual Cinema, and includes a large number of cut scenes. Included in the gameplay are numerous occasions in which the player can alter other character's attitudes and reactions depending upon responses and actions (or inactions).

Dubbed "UberVariables", certain decisions made by the player can set them along one of three tracks: Paranoia (Willmore will start seeing things like twitching corpses and shadowy figures), Loss (messages from his ex-wife are kinder), and "The X-Track" (more details are revealed about myth arc-related conspiracies). The player can also affect Willmore's relationship with Astadourian positively and negatively based upon how he responds to her suggestions and ideas.

== Production ==
The game's developer, HyperBole Studios, had initially rejected the project when Fox approached them. They later became interested when they started to watch the show for themselves. The title's design document was over 1000 pages, while the shooting script was 748+ pages, written using FileMaker Pro due to the number of options available to the player. In total, around 6 hours of footage was filmed for the game. The game's development cost $6 million and lasted four years. Shooting for the scenes were done in Seattle.

The video portions of the game were filmed between seasons of The X-Files and just before the feature film. Some footage in the game, such as the hotel rooms and excerpts from Keystone Cops, is the same as seen in the episode "Syzygy". Anderson and Duchovny were very busy due to their required presence for the production of the feature film, thus requiring the disappearance of Mulder and Scully and the introduction of the Willmore character. A former U.S. naval base, at Sand Point, was used as the setting for the NSA facility at the end of the game, and the boat used as the Tarakan is a training ocean-going tug, which had previously been used in a drug smuggling plot. The 'melted blast effects' on the Tarakan were made using water-soluble paint, which caused havoc when it began to rain during filming. "Tarakan" is Russian for cockroach.

The game was filmed on Digital Betacam tape with Sony cameras and captured using Power Macintoshes running Adobe Premiere and Media 100. The X-Files Game was displayed at the 1996 Electronic Entertainment Expo (E3) in June.

For the game's Japanese version, it was only released with Japanese dubs.

== Reception ==
=== Sales ===
The X-Files Game was a commercial success. In the United States, it placed fifth on PC Data's computer game sales chart for the week ending June 20, and held the position the following week. It remained in the weekly top 10 through the June 28-July 11 period, but was absent from the charts by its fifth week. The X-Files Game was the ninth-best-selling computer title in the United States during June 1998, with an average retail price of $42. It remained in PC Data's monthly top 20 for another month before exiting in August. By July, the computer version of The X-Files Game had sold 64,680 copies and earned $2,769,311 in the United States alone. In the United Kingdom, the computer version debuted at #1 in Chart-Track's rankings during its first two weeks, and held in the top 10 after nine weeks.

According to HyperBole's Jason VandenBerghe, The X-Files Game made it into "the top-10-bestseller lists in most territories it shipped to." Breaking down its popularity by region, he wrote, "Our strongest markets were Europe and Japan, where The X-Files is an even larger phenomenon than it is here in the States". Total sales of The X-Files Game reached roughly one million copies.

=== Computer versions ===
Reception

Aggregate scores
| Aggregator | Score |
|---|---|
| GameRankings | 59.97% |
| Metacritic | 56/100 |

Review scores
| Publication | Score |
|---|---|
| Computer Gaming World | 3/5 |
| PC Gamer (US) | 35% |
| PC Zone | 40% |
| PC Gaming World | 9.5/10 |
| Entertainment Weekly | B+ |
| Computer Games Strategy Plus | 3.5/5 |
| PC Magazine | 2/5 |
| PC Games | B+ |
| The Cincinnati Enquirer | 2.5/5 |
| Macworld | 3/5 |
| MacAddict | "Freakin' Awesome!" |

Macworld wrote that The X-Files Game's "excellent use of QuickTime video is offset by tediously slow sections."

During the Academy of Interactive Arts & Sciences' 2nd Annual Interactive Achievement Awards, The X-Files Game was a finalist for "Computer Entertainment Title of the Year", "PC Adventure Game of the Year" and "Outstanding Achievement in Character or Story Development", although it lost these prizes to Half-Life, Grim Fandango and Pokémon Red and Blue, respectively.

=== PlayStation version ===
Reception

Aggregate score
| Aggregator | Score |
|---|---|
| GameRankings | 53.00% |

Review scores
| Publication | Score |
|---|---|
| AllGame | 3.5/5 |
| Computer and Video Games | 2/5 |
| Game Informer | 3.75/10 |
| GameSpot | 4.2/10 |
| IGN | 5/10 |
| Next Generation | 2/5 |
| Official U.S. PlayStation Magazine | 3/5 |
| The Sydney Morning Herald | 4/5 |

Jeff Lundrigan reviewed the PlayStation version of the game for Next Generation, rating it two stars out of five, and stated that "Although well produced and faithful to its source, X-Files just demonstrates that even the best FMV adventure games still aren't great games."

== Reviews ==
- Backstab #12

== Bibliography ==
- Barba, Rick (1999). The X-Files: Prima's Official Strategy Guide. Prima Development. ISBN 978-0761525950.
