= Rogue Leader =

Rogue Leader may refer to:

- Star Wars Rogue Squadron II: Rogue Leader, a video game for the GameCube
- X-Wing: Rogue Leader, a three-part comic book series

== See also ==
- Rogue Leaders: The Story of LucasArts
- Rogue One, the first Star Wars Anthology film
