= D.I.C.E. Award for Adventure Game of the Year =

Annual award presented by the Academy of Interactive Arts & Sciences

- Country: United States
- Presented by: Academy of Interactive Arts & Sciences
- First award: 1998
- Currently held by: Ghost of Yōtei
- Website: interactive.org

The D.I.C.E. Award for Adventure Game of the Year is an award presented annually by the Academy of Interactive Arts & Sciences during the D.I.C.E. Awards. This award recognizes titles in which "players are challenged with real-time action activities where timing, skill, and accuracy are necessary to succeed. Puzzle-solving, resource management and exploration often drive the quest oriented narrative rather than primarily combat mechanics". All active creative/technical, business, and affiliate members of the Academy are qualified to vote for this category. The award initially had separate awards for console games and computer games at the 1st Annual Interactive Achievement Awards in 1998, with the first winners being Final Fantasy VII for console and Blade Runner for computer. There have been numerous mergers and additions of adventure-related games throughout the early years of the awards ceremony. The current version was officially introduced at the 11th Annual Interactive Achievement Awards in 2008, which was awarded to Super Mario Galaxy.

The award's most recent winner is Ghost of Yōtei, developed by Sucker Punch Productions and published by Sony Interactive Entertainment.

== History ==
Initially the Interactive Achievement Awards had separate awards for Console Adventure Game of the Year and Computer Adventure Game of the Year. The adventure category was merged with the Role-Playing category at the 2000 awards; this was probably because the previous console adventure game winners also won the award for console role-playing, which were Final Fantasy VII in 1998 and The Legend of Zelda: Ocarina of Time in 1999. In 2001, the awards for action games and adventure games were consolidated to Action/Adventure awards, recognizing titles in which players are challenged with real-time action activities and combat where possibly skill, accuracy and puzzle-solving are required. A category for Console Platform Action/Adventure Game of the Year was also introduced in 2003. Starting in 2006, genre specific awards would no longer have separate categories for console and computer games, resulting in only Action/Adventure Game of the Year award, which also included platform games going forward. This would ultimately be separated into Action Game of the Year and Adventure Game of the Year in 2008.

- Console Adventure Game of the Year (1998—1999)
- Computer Adventure Game of the Year (1998—1999)
- Console Adventure/Role-Playing Game of the Year (2000)
- Computer Adventure/Role-Playing Game of the Year (2000)
- Console Action/Adventure Game of the Year (2001—2005)
- Computer Action/Adventure Game of the Year (2001—2005)
- Console Platform Action/Adventure Game of the Year (2003—2005)
- Action/Adventure Game of the Year (2006—2007)
- Adventure Game of the Year (2008—present)

== Winners and nominees ==
=== 1990s ===
Table key
| Indicates the winner |

| Year | Game | Developer(s) | Publisher(s) | Ref. |
|---|---|---|---|---|
| 1997/1998 (1st) | Console Adventure Game of the Year | | | |
| 1997/1998 (1st) | Final Fantasy VII | SquareSoft | Sony Computer Entertainment | |
| 1997/1998 (1st) | Castlevania: Symphony of the Night | Konami | Konami | |
| 1997/1998 (1st) | Oddworld: Abe's Oddysee | Oddworld Inhabitants | GT Interactive | |
| 1997/1998 (1st) | Resident Evil 2 | Capcom | Capcom | |
| 1997/1998 (1st) | Riven: The Sequel to Myst | Cyan Worlds | Acclaim Entertainment | |
| 1997/1998 (1st) | PC Adventure Game of the Year | | | |
| 1997/1998 (1st) | Blade Runner | Westwood Studios | Virgin Interactive | |
| 1997/1998 (1st) | The Curse of Monkey Island | LucasArts | LucasArts | |
| 1997/1998 (1st) | Realms of the Haunting | Gremlin Interactive | Interplay Productions | |
| 1997/1998 (1st) | Riven: The Sequel to Myst | Cyan Worlds | Red Orb Entertainment | |
| 1997/1998 (1st) | Tex Murphy: Overseer | Access Software | Access Software | |
| 1997/1998 (1st) | The Journeyman Project 3: Legacy of Time | Presto Studios | Red Orb Entertainment | |
| 1998/1999 (2nd) | Console Adventure Game of the Year | | | |
| 1998/1999 (2nd) | The Legend of Zelda: Ocarina of Time | Nintendo EAD | Nintendo | |
| 1998/1999 (2nd) | Banjo-Kazooie | Rare | Nintendo | |
| 1998/1999 (2nd) | MediEvil | Cambridge Studio | Sony Computer Entertainment | |
| 1998/1999 (2nd) | Oddworld: Abe's Exoddus | Oddworld Inhabitants | GT Interactive | |
| 1998/1999 (2nd) | PC Adventure Game of the Year | | | |
| 1998/1999 (2nd) | Grim Fandango | LucasArts | LucasArts | |
| 1998/1999 (2nd) | Dark Side of the Moon: A Sci-Fi Adventure | SouthPeak Interactive | SouthPeak Interactive | |
| 1998/1999 (2nd) | King's Quest: Mask of Eternity | Sierra On-Line | Sierra On-Line | |
| 1998/1999 (2nd) | Sanitarium | DreamForge Intertainment | ASC Games | |
| 1998/1999 (2nd) | Starship Titanic | The Digital Village | Simon & Schuster Interactive | |
| 1998/1999 (2nd) | The X-Files Game | HyperBole Studios | Fox Interactive | |
| 1999/2000 (3rd) | Console Adventure/Role Playing Game of the Year | | | |
| 1999/2000 (3rd) | Final Fantasy VIII | SquareSoft | Square Electronic Arts | |
| 1999/2000 (3rd) | Legacy of Kain: Soul Reaver | Crystal Dynamics | Eidos Interactive | |
| 1999/2000 (3rd) | Legend of Legaia | Contrail | Sony Computer Entertainment | |
| 1999/2000 (3rd) | Computer Adventure/Role Playing Game of the Year | | | |
| 1999/2000 (3rd) | Asheron's Call | Turbine | Microsoft | |
| 1999/2000 (3rd) | Gabriel Knight 3: Blood of the Sacred, Blood of the Damned | Sierra On-Line | Sierra On-Line | |
| 1999/2000 (3rd) | Outcast | Appeal | Infogrames | |
| 1999/2000 (3rd) | Planescape: Torment | Black Isle Studios | Interplay Entertainment | |
| 1999/2000 (3rd) | Ultima IX: Ascension | Origin Systems | Electronic Arts | |

=== 2000s ===
| Year | Game | Developer(s) | Publisher(s) | Ref. |
|---|---|---|---|---|
| 2000 (4th) | Console Action/Adventure Game of the Year | | | |
| 2000 (4th) | The Legend of Zelda: Majora's Mask | Nintendo EAD | Nintendo | |
| 2000 (4th) | Banjo-Tooie | Rare | Nintendo | |
| 2000 (4th) | Rayman 2: The Great Escape | Ubi Pictures | Ubisoft | |
| 2000 (4th) | Spyro: Year of the Dragon | Insomniac Games | Sony Computer Entertainment | |
| 2000 (4th) | Vagrant Story | SquareSoft | Square Electronic Arts | |
| 2000 (4th) | PC Action/Adventure Game of the Year | | | |
| 2000 (4th) | Deus Ex | Ion Storm | Eidos Interactive | |
| 2000 (4th) | Crimson Skies | Zipper Interactive | Microsoft Games | |
| 2000 (4th) | Escape from Monkey Island | LucasArts | LucasArts | |
| 2000 (4th) | Star Trek: Voyager – Elite Force | Raven Software | Activision | |
| 2000 (4th) | The Operative: No One Lives Forever | Monolith Productions | Fox Interactive | |
| 2001 (5th) | Console Action/Adventure Game of the Year | | | |
| 2001 (5th) | Halo: Combat Evolved | Bungie | Microsoft Game Studios | |
| 2001 (5th) | Conker's Bad Fur Day | Rare | Rare | |
| 2001 (5th) | Grand Theft Auto III | DMA Design | Rockstar Games | |
| 2001 (5th) | Ico | Japan Studio | Sony Computer Entertainment | |
| 2001 (5th) | Jak & Daxter: The Precursor Legacy | Naughty Dog | Sony Computer Entertainment | |
| 2001 (5th) | PC Action/Adventure Game of the Year | | | |
| 2001 (5th) | Return to Castle Wolfenstein | Gray Matter Studios | Activision | |
| 2001 (5th) | Aliens Versus Predator 2 | Monolith Productions | Sierra On-Line | |
| 2001 (5th) | Clive Barker's Undying | EA Los Angeles | Electronic Arts | |
| 2001 (5th) | Myst III: Exile | Presto Studios | Ubisoft | |
| 2002 (6th) | Console Action/Adventure Game of the Year | | | |
| 2002 (6th) | Grand Theft Auto: Vice City | Rockstar North | Rockstar Games | |
| 2002 (6th) | Hitman 2: Silent Assassin | IO Interactive | Eidos Interactive | |
| 2002 (6th) | Jet Set Radio Future | Smilebit | Sega | |
| 2002 (6th) | Rez | United Game Artists | Sega | |
| 2002 (6th) | Tom Clancy's Splinter Cell | Ubisoft Montreal | Ubisoft | |
| 2002 (6th) | Computer Action/Adventure Game of the Year | | | |
| 2002 (6th) | Grand Theft Auto III | Rockstar North | Rockstar Games | |
| 2002 (6th) | Star Wars Jedi Knight II: Jedi Outcast | Raven Software | LucasArts | |
| 2002 (6th) | Syberia | Microïds | The Adventure Company | |
| 2002 (6th) | The Thing | Computer Artworks | Black Label Games | |
| 2002 (6th) | Console Platform Action/Adventure Game of the Year | | | |
| 2002 (6th) | Ratchet & Clank | Insomniac Games | Sony Computer Entertainment | |
| 2002 (6th) | Sly Cooper and the Thievius Raccoonus | Sucker Punch Productions | Sony Computer Entertainment | |
| 2002 (6th) | Super Mario Sunshine | Nintendo EAD | Nintendo | |
| 2003 (7th) | Console Action/Adventure Game of the Year | | | |
| 2003 (7th) | Crimson Skies: High Road to Revenge | FASA Studio | Microsoft Game Studios | |
| 2003 (7th) | Manhunt | Rockstar North | Rockstar Games | |
| 2003 (7th) | Max Payne 2: The Fall of Max Payne | Remedy Entertainment | Rockstar Games | |
| 2003 (7th) | Metal Arms: Glitch in the System | Swingin' Ape Studios, Mass Media Games | Vivendi Universal Games | |
| 2003 (7th) | The Simpsons: Hit & Run | Radical Entertainment | Vivendi Universal Games | |
| 2003 (7th) | Computer Action/Adventure Game of the Year | | | |
| 2003 (7th) | Prince of Persia: The Sands of Time | Ubisoft Montreal | Ubisoft | |
| 2003 (7th) | Grand Theft Auto: Vice City | Rockstar North | Rockstar Games | |
| 2003 (7th) | Max Payne 2: The Fall of Max Payne | Remedy Entertainment | Rockstar Games | |
| 2003 (7th) | The Lord of the Rings: The Return of the King | EA Redwood Studios | Electronic Arts | |
| 2003 (7th) | Uru: Ages Beyond Myst | Cyan Worlds | Ubisoft | |
| 2003 (7th) | Console Platform Action/Adventure Game of the Year | | | |
| 2003 (7th) | Prince of Persia: The Sands of Time | Ubisoft Montreal | Ubisoft | |
| 2003 (7th) | Jak II | Naughty Dog | Sony Computer Entertainment | |
| 2003 (7th) | Ratchet & Clank: Going Commando | Insomniac Games | Sony Computer Entertainment | |
| 2003 (7th) | The Legend of Zelda: The Wind Waker | Nintendo EAD | Nintendo | |
| 2003 (7th) | Viewtiful Joe | Clover Studio | Capcom | |
| 2004 (8th) | Console Action/Adventure Game of the Year | | | |
| 2004 (8th) | Grand Theft Auto: San Andreas | Rockstar North | Rockstar Games | |
| 2004 (8th) | Full Spectrum Warrior | Pandemic Studios | THQ | |
| 2004 (8th) | Metal Gear Solid 3: Snake Eater | Konami | Konami | |
| 2004 (8th) | Pikmin 2 | Nintendo EAD | Nintendo | |
| 2004 (8th) | Psi-Ops: The Mindgate Conspiracy | Midway Games | Midway Games | |
| 2004 (8th) | Tom Clancy's Splinter Cell: Pandora Tomorrow | Ubisoft Milan, Ubisoft Shanghai, Ubisoft Annecy | Ubisoft | |
| 2004 (8th) | Computer Action/Adventure Game of the Year | | | |
| 2004 (8th) | Tom Clancy's Splinter Cell: Pandora Tomorrow | Ubisoft Milan, Ubisoft Shanghai, Ubisoft Annecy | Ubisoft | |
| 2004 (8th) | Full Spectrum Warrior | Pandemic Studios | THQ | |
| 2004 (8th) | Myst IV: Revelation | Ubisoft Montreal | Ubisoft | |
| 2004 (8th) | The Suffering | Surreal Software | Midway Games, Encore, Inc. | |
| 2004 (8th) | Console Platform Action/Adventure Game of the Year | | | |
| 2004 (8th) | Prince of Persia: Warrior Within | Ubisoft Montreal | Ubisoft | |
| 2004 (8th) | Jak 3 | Naughty Dog | Sony Computer Entertainment | |
| 2004 (8th) | Ratchet & Clank: Up Your Arsenal | Insomniac Games | Sony Computer Entertainment | |
| 2005 (Note: 9th and 10th ceremonies still had single awards for Action/Adventure.) (9th) | God of War | Santa Monica Studio | Sony Computer Entertainment | |
| 2005 (9th) | Prince of Persia: The Two Thrones | Ubisoft Montreal | Ubisoft | |
| 2005 (9th) | Shadow of the Colossus | Japan Studio | Sony Computer Entertainment | |
| 2005 (9th) | The Incredible Hulk: Ultimate Destruction | Radical Entertainment | Vivendi Universal Games | |
| 2005 (9th) | Tom Clancy's Splinter Cell: Chaos Theory | Ubisoft Montreal, Ubisoft Milan | Ubisoft | |
| 2006 (10th) | Gears of War | Epic Games | Microsoft Game Studios | |
| 2006 (10th) | Daxter | Ready at Dawn | Sony Computer Entertainment | |
| 2006 (10th) | Saints Row | Volition | THQ | |
| 2006 (10th) | The Legend of Zelda: Twilight Princess | Nintendo EAD | Nintendo | |
| 2006 (10th) | Tom Clancy's Splinter Cell: Double Agent | Ubisoft Milan, Ubisoft Shanghai, Ubisoft Montreal | Ubisoft | |
| 2007 (11th) | Super Mario Galaxy | Nintendo EAD | Nintendo | |
| 2007 (11th) | Assassin's Creed | Ubisoft Montreal | Ubisoft | |
| 2007 (11th) | God of War II | Santa Monica Studio | Sony Computer Entertainment | |
| 2007 (11th) | Ratchet & Clank Future: Tools of Destruction | Insomniac Games | Sony Computer Entertainment | |
| 2007 (11th) | Uncharted: Drake's Fortune | Naughty Dog | Sony Computer Entertainment | |
| 2008 (12th) | Mirror's Edge | DICE | Electronic Arts | |
| 2008 (12th) | Castlevania: Order of Ecclesia | Konami | Konami | |
| 2008 (12th) | God of War: Chains of Olympus | Ready at Dawn | Sony Computer Entertainment | |
| 2008 (12th) | Naruto: The Broken Bond | Ubisoft Montreal | Ubisoft | |
| 2008 (12th) | Prince of Persia | Ubisoft Montreal | Ubisoft | |
| 2009 (13th) | Uncharted 2: Among Thieves | Naughty Dog | Sony Computer Entertainment | |
| 2009 (13th) | Assassin's Creed II | Ubisoft Montreal | Ubisoft | |
| 2009 (13th) | Batman: Arkham Asylum | Rocksteady Studios | Warner Bros. Interactive Entertainment | |
| 2009 (13th) | New Super Mario Bros. Wii | Nintendo EAD | Nintendo | |
| 2009 (13th) | Ratchet & Clank Future: A Crack in Time | Insomniac Games | Sony Computer Entertainment | |

=== 2010s ===
| Year | Game | Developer(s) | Publisher(s) | Ref. |
|---|---|---|---|---|
| 2010 (14th) | Limbo | Playdead | Playdead | |
| 2010 (14th) | Alan Wake | Remedy Entertainment | Microsoft Game Studios | |
| 2010 (14th) | Assassin's Creed: Brotherhood | Ubisoft Montreal | Ubisoft | |
| 2010 (14th) | Enslaved: Odyssey to the West | Ninja Theory | Namco Bandai Games | |
| 2010 (14th) | Heavy Rain | Quantic Dream | Sony Computer Entertainment | |
| 2011 (15th) | Batman: Arkham City | Rocksteady Studios | Warner Bros. Interactive Entertainment | |
| 2011 (15th) | L.A. Noire | Team Bondi | Rockstar Games | |
| 2011 (15th) | Portal 2 | Valve | Valve | |
| 2011 (15th) | The Legend of Zelda: Skyward Sword | Nintendo EAD | Nintendo | |
| 2011 (15th) | Uncharted 3: Drake's Deception | Naughty Dog | Sony Computer Entertainment | |
| 2012 (16th) | The Walking Dead | Telltale Games | Telltale Games | |
| 2012 (16th) | Assassin's Creed III | Ubisoft Montreal | Ubisoft | |
| 2012 (16th) | Darksiders II | Vigil Games | THQ | |
| 2012 (16th) | Dishonored | Arkane Studios | Bethesda Softworks | |
| 2012 (16th) | New Super Mario Bros. U | Nintendo EAD | Nintendo | |
| 2013 (17th) | The Last of Us | Naughty Dog | Sony Computer Entertainment | |
| 2013 (17th) | Assassin's Creed IV: Black Flag | Ubisoft Montreal | Ubisoft | |
| 2013 (17th) | Tearaway | Media Molecule | Sony Computer Entertainment | |
| 2013 (17th) | The Legend of Zelda: A Link Between Worlds | Nintendo EAD | Nintendo | |
| 2013 (17th) | Tomb Raider | Crystal Dynamics | Square Enix Europe | |
| 2014 (18th) | Middle-earth: Shadow of Mordor | Monolith Productions | Warner Bros. Interactive Entertainment | |
| 2014 (18th) | Infamous Second Son | Sucker Punch Productions | Sony Computer Entertainment | |
| 2014 (18th) | The Vanishing of Ethan Carter | The Astronauts | The Astronauts | |
| 2014 (18th) | The Wolf Among Us | Telltale Games | Telltale Games | |
| 2014 (18th) | Valiant Hearts: The Great War | Ubisoft Montpellier | Ubisoft | |
| 2015 (19th) | Metal Gear Solid V: The Phantom Pain | Kojima Productions | Konami | |
| 2015 (19th) | Batman: Arkham Knight | Rocksteady Studios | Warner Bros. Interactive Entertainment | |
| 2015 (19th) | Life Is Strange | Don't Nod | Square Enix Europe | |
| 2015 (19th) | Ori and the Blind Forest | Moon Studios | Microsoft Studios | |
| 2015 (19th) | Rise of the Tomb Raider | Crystal Dynamics | Square Enix Europe | |
| 2016 (20th) | Uncharted 4: A Thief's End | Naughty Dog | Sony Interactive Entertainment | |
| 2016 (20th) | Firewatch | Campo Santo | Campo Santo | |
| 2016 (20th) | Inside | Playdead | Playdead | |
| 2016 (20th) | King's Quest: The Complete Collection | The Odd Gentlemen | Activision | |
| 2016 (20th) | The Last Guardian | Japan Studio | Sony Interactive Entertainment | |
| 2017 (21st) | The Legend of Zelda: Breath of the Wild | Nintendo EPD | Nintendo | |
| 2017 (21st) | Assassin's Creed Origins | Ubisoft Montreal | Ubisoft | |
| 2017 (21st) | Horizon Zero Dawn | Guerrilla Games | Sony Interactive Entertainment | |
| 2017 (21st) | Super Mario Odyssey | Nintendo EPD | Nintendo | |
| 2017 (21st) | Uncharted: The Lost Legacy | Naughty Dog | Sony Interactive Entertainment | |
| 2018 (22nd) | God of War | Santa Monica Studio | Sony Interactive Entertainment | |
| 2018 (22nd) | Detroit: Become Human | Quantic Dream | Sony Interactive Entertainment | |
| 2018 (22nd) | Marvel's Spider-Man | Insomniac Games | Sony Interactive Entertainment | |
| 2018 (22nd) | Red Dead Redemption 2 | Rockstar Games | Rockstar Games | |
| 2018 (22nd) | Return of the Obra Dinn | Lucas Pope | 3909 | |
| 2019 (23rd) | Star Wars Jedi: Fallen Order | Respawn Entertainment | Electronic Arts | |
| 2019 (23rd) | Death Stranding | Kojima Productions | Sony Interactive Entertainment | |
| 2019 (23rd) | Luigi's Mansion 3 | Next Level Games | Nintendo | |
| 2019 (23rd) | Resident Evil 2 | Capcom | Capcom | |
| 2019 (23rd) | The Legend of Zelda: Link's Awakening | Grezzo | Nintendo | |

=== 2020s ===
| Year | Game | Developer(s) | Publisher(s) | Ref. |
|---|---|---|---|---|
| 2020 (24th) | Ghost of Tsushima | Sucker Punch Productions | Sony Interactive Entertainment | |
| 2020 (24th) | Assassin's Creed Valhalla | Ubisoft Montreal | Ubisoft | |
| 2020 (24th) | Kentucky Route Zero | Cardboard Computer | Annapurna Interactive | |
| 2020 (24th) | The Last of Us Part II | Naughty Dog | Sony Interactive Entertainment | |
| 2020 (24th) | Ori and the Will of the Wisps | Moon Studios | Xbox Game Studios | |
| 2021 (25th) | Marvel's Guardians of the Galaxy | Eidos-Montréal | Square Enix Europe | |
| 2021 (25th) | Death's Door | Acid Nerve | Devolver Digital | |
| 2021 (25th) | It Takes Two | Hazelight Studios | Electronic Arts | |
| 2021 (25th) | Psychonauts 2 | Double Fine Productions | Xbox Game Studios | |
| 2021 (25th) | Resident Evil Village | Capcom | Capcom | |
| 2022 (26th) | God of War Ragnarök | Santa Monica Studio | Sony Interactive Entertainment | |
| 2022 (26th) | Horizon Forbidden West | Guerrilla Games | Sony Interactive Entertainment | |
| 2022 (26th) | Norco | Geography of Robots | Raw Fury | |
| 2022 (26th) | Stray | BlueTwelve Studios | Annapurna Interactive | |
| 2022 (26th) | Tunic | Isometricorps Games | Finji | |
| 2023 (27th) | The Legend of Zelda: Tears of the Kingdom | Nintendo EPD | Nintendo | |
| 2023 (27th) | Alan Wake 2 | Remedy Entertainment | Epic Games | |
| 2023 (27th) | Cocoon | Geometric Interactive | Annapurna Interactive | |
| 2023 (27th) | Dave the Diver | Mintrocket | Mintrocket | |
| 2023 (27th) | Star Wars Jedi: Survivor | Respawn Entertainment | Electronic Arts | |
| 2024 (28th) | Indiana Jones and the Great Circle | MachineGames | Bethesda Softworks | |
| 2024 (28th) | 1000xResist | Sunset Visitor | Fellow Traveller Games | |
| 2024 (28th) | Animal Well | Shared Memory | Bigmode | |
| 2024 (28th) | The Legend of Zelda: Echoes of Wisdom | Nintendo EPD, Grezzo | Nintendo | |
| 2024 (28th) | Prince of Persia: The Lost Crown | Ubisoft Montpellier | Ubisoft | |
| 2025 (29th) | Ghost of Yōtei | Sucker Punch Productions | Sony Interactive Entertainment | |
| 2025 (29th) | Blue Prince | Dogubomb | Raw Fury | |
| 2025 (29th) | Dispatch | AdHoc Studio | AdHoc Studio | |
| 2025 (29th) | Donkey Kong Bananza | Nintendo EPD | Nintendo | |
| 2025 (29th) | Hollow Knight: Silksong | Team Cherry | Team Cherry | |

== Multiple nominations and wins ==
=== Developers and publishers ===
Out of all the publishers, Sony has published the most nominees and the most winners for adventure-related awards. Ubisoft Montreal has developed the most nominees while Nintendo, internally, has developed the most award winners. Ubisoft Montreal and Ubisoft are the only developer and publisher, respectively, to win more than one adventure game award for the same game in the same year with Prince of Persia: The Sands of Time. Rockstar North and Rockstar Games also won multiple adventure game awards in the same year, but for different games. Ubisoft Montreal is also the only developer to have back-to-back wins for the same category, being Console Platform Action/Adventure Game of the Year in 2004 and 2005. Ubisoft as a publisher also had back-to-back wins for Computer Action/Adventure Game of the Year in 2004 and 2005, but with different developers.

Developers
| Developer | Nominations | Wins |
|---|---|---|
| Nintendo EAD/EPD | 16 | 5 |
| Ubisoft Montreal | 17 | 3 |
| Naughty Dog | 10 | 3 |
| DMA Design/Rockstar North | 6 | 3 |
| Santa Monica Studio | 4 | 3 |
| Sucker Punch Productions | 4 | 2 |
| SquareSoft | 3 | 2 |
| Insomniac Games | 7 | 1 |
| Ubisoft Milan | 4 | 1 |
| Ubisoft Shanghai | 4 | 1 |
| LucasArts | 3 | 1 |
| Monolith Productions | 3 | 1 |
| Rocksteady Studios | 3 | 1 |
| Kojima Productions | 2 | 1 |
| Playdead | 2 | 1 |
| Respawn Entertainment | 2 | 1 |
| Telltale Games | 2 | 1 |
| Remedy Entertainment | 4 | 0 |
| Capcom | 3 | 0 |
| Crystal Dynamics | 3 | 0 |
| Cyan Worlds | 3 | 0 |
| Japan Studio | 3 | 0 |
| Konami | 3 | 0 |
| Rare | 3 | 0 |
| Ubi Pictures/Ubisoft Montpellier | 3 | 0 |
| Grezzo | 2 | 0 |
| Guerrilla Games | 2 | 0 |
| Moon Studios | 2 | 0 |
| Oddworld Inhabitants | 2 | 0 |
| Pandemic Studios | 2 | 0 |
| Presto Studios | 2 | 0 |
| Quantic Dream | 2 | 0 |
| Radical Entertainment | 2 | 0 |
| Raven Software | 2 | 0 |
| Ready at Dawn | 2 | 0 |
| Sierra On-Line | 2 | 0 |

Publishers
| Publisher | Nominations | Wins |
|---|---|---|
| Sony Computer/Interactive Entertainment | 39 | 10 |
| Nintendo | 20 | 5 |
| Ubisoft | 23 | 4 |
| Electronic Arts | 9 | 3 |
| Microsoft/Xbox Game Studios | 9 | 3 |
| Rockstar Games | 9 | 3 |
| Eidos Interactive/Square Enix Europe | 7 | 2 |
| SquareSoft/Square Enix | 6 | 2 |
| Warner Bros. Interactive Entertainment | 4 | 2 |
| Konami | 4 | 1 |
| LucasArts | 4 | 1 |
| Activision | 3 | 1 |
| Bethesda Softworks | 2 | 1 |
| Telltale Games | 2 | 1 |
| Capcom | 4 | 0 |
| THQ | 4 | 0 |
| Annapurna Interactive | 3 | 0 |
| Sierra On-Line | 3 | 0 |
| Vivendi Universal Games | 3 | 0 |
| Fox Interactive | 2 | 0 |
| GT Interactive | 2 | 0 |
| Interplay Productions/Entertainment | 2 | 0 |
| Midway Games | 2 | 0 |
| Raw Fury | 2 | 0 |
| Red Orb Entertainment | 2 | 0 |
| Sega | 2 | 0 |

=== Franchises ===
The Legend of Zelda franchise has received the most nominations and won the most awards. The Assassin's Creed franchise is second in nominations but has not won a single award. In the early years of the Interactive Achievement Awards when there were multiple awards for adventure-related genres, some games received multiple nominations in the same year:

- Riven: The Sequel to Myst (1998): Nominated for Console Adventure Game of the Year and Computer Adventure Game of the Year.
- Prince of Persia: The Sands of Time (2004): Won Computer Action/Adventure Game of the Year and Console Platform Action/Adventure Game of the Year.
- Max Payne 2: The Fall of Max Payne (2004): Nominated for Console Action/Adventure Game of the Year and Computer Action/Adventure Game of the Year.
- Full Spectrum Warrior (2005): Nominated for Console Action/Adventure Game of the Year and Computer Action/Adventure Game of the Year.
- Tom Clancy's Splinter Cell: Pandora Tomorrow (2005): Nominated for Console Action/Adventure Game of the Year, and won Computer Action/Adventure Game of the Year.

Grand Theft Auto is the only franchise to win computer and console adventure game awards within the same year, but with different games: in 2003 for Console Action/Adventure Game of the Year with Grand Theft Auto: Vice City, and Computer Action/Adventure Game of the Year with Grand Theft Auto III. In addition, these two games are the only games to receive more than one nomination spread across more than one year:

- Grand Theft Auto III was nominated for Console Action/Adventure Game of the Year in 2002, and won Computer Action/Adventure Game of the Year in 2003.
- Grand Theft Auto: Vice City won Console Action/Adventure Game of the Year in 2003, and was nominated for Computer Action/Adventure Game of the Year in 2004.

The only franchise to have back-to-back wins for the same adventure-related award is Prince of Persia for Console Platform Action/Adventure Game of the Year in 2004 with Prince of Persia: The Sands of Time, and 2005 with Prince of Persia: Warrior Within. The original Resident Evil 2 has been nominated for Console Adventure Game of the Year in 1998, and the 2019 remake has been nominated in 2020.

Franchises
| Franchise | Nominations | Wins |
|---|---|---|
| The Legend of Zelda | 10 | 4 |
| Prince of Persia | 6 | 3 |
| God of War | 5 | 3 |
| Grand Theft Auto | 5 | 3 |
| Uncharted | 5 | 2 |
| Final Fantasy | 2 | 2 |
| Ghost | 2 | 2 |
| Mario (Note: Includes Luigi's Mansion 3.) | 6 | 1 |
| Ratchet & Clank | 5 | 1 |
| Tom Clancy's Splinter Cell | 5 | 1 |
| Batman: Arkham | 3 | 1 |
| Star Wars | 3 | 1 |
| Crimson Skies | 2 | 1 |
| Marvel | 2 | 1 |
| Metal Gear | 2 | 1 |
| The Last of Us | 2 | 1 |
| Assassin's Creed | 7 | 0 |
| Myst | 5 | 0 |
| Jak & Daxter | 4 | 0 |
| Resident Evil | 3 | 0 |
| Alan Wake | 2 | 0 |
| Banjo-Kazooie | 2 | 0 |
| Castlevania | 2 | 0 |
| Full Spectrum Warrior | 2 | 0 |
| Horizon | 2 | 0 |
| King's Quest | 2 | 0 |
| Max Payne | 2 | 0 |
| Monkey Island | 2 | 0 |
| Ori | 2 | 0 |
| Oddworld | 2 | 0 |
| Tomb Raider | 2 | 0 |
