= Calaca =

Traditional decoration for the Day of the Dead

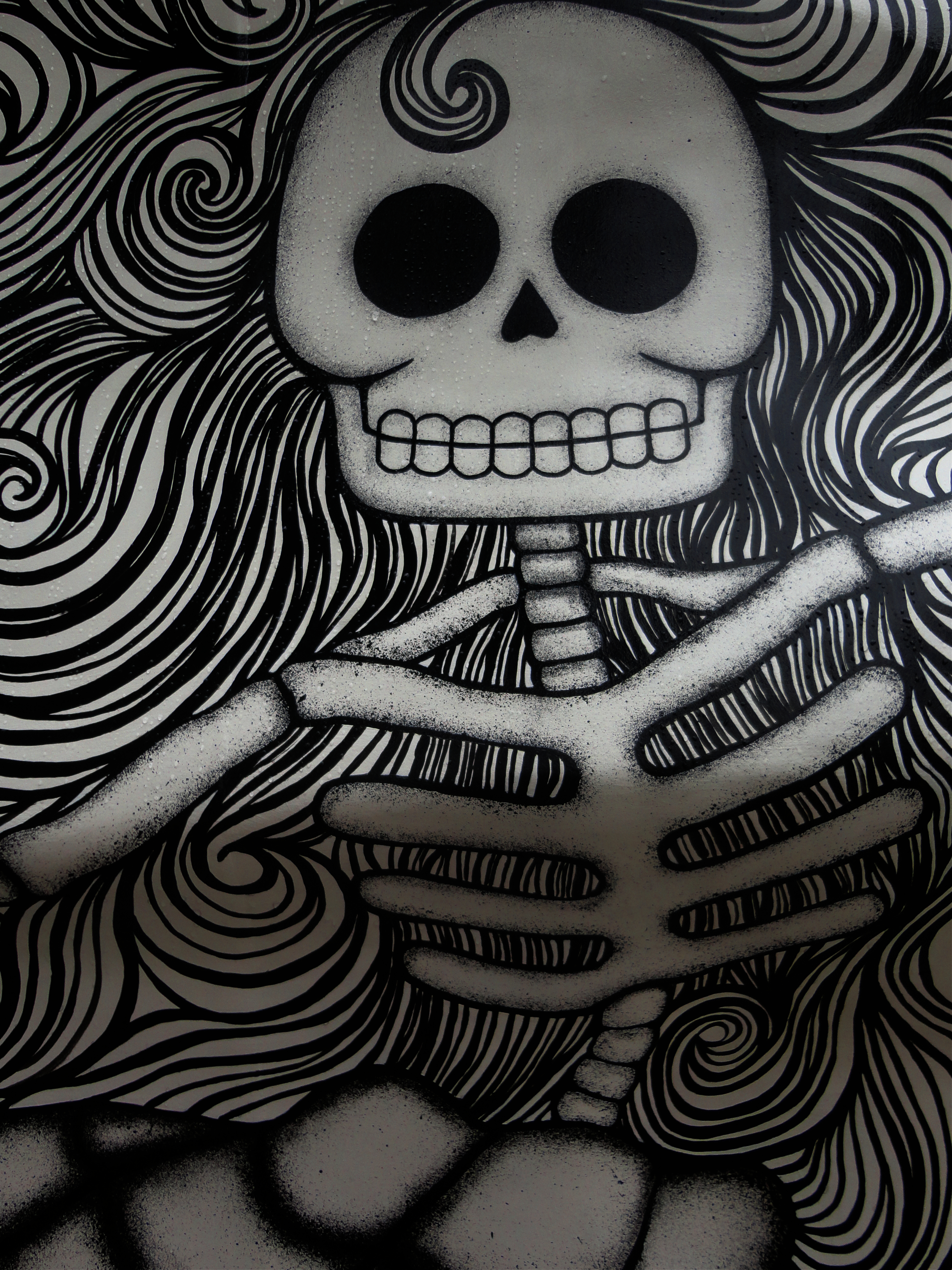
A calaca of La Calavera Catrina

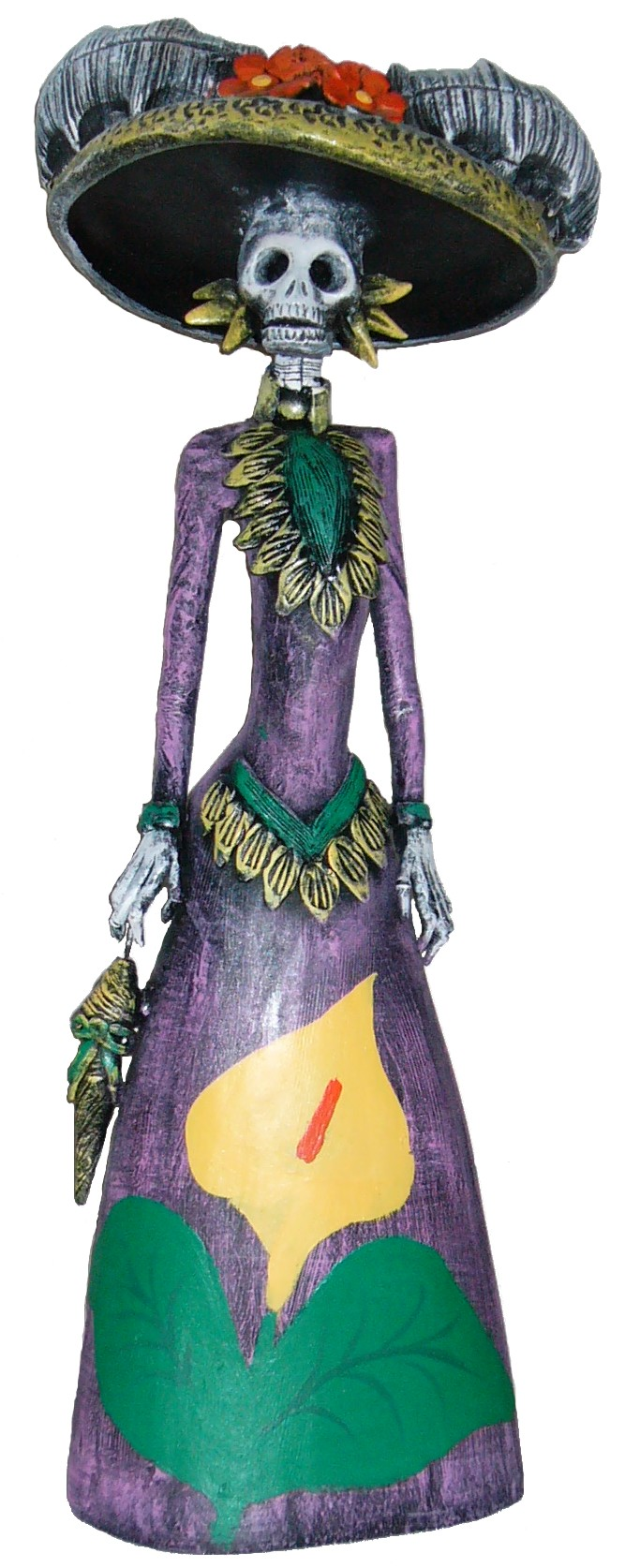
A calaca sculpture in the form of a "Catrina"

A calaca (Spanish pronunciation: [kaˈlaka], a colloquial Mexican Spanish name for skeleton) is a figure of a skull or skeleton (usually human) commonly used for decoration during the Mexican Day of the Dead festival, although they are made all year round. In Mexico and a few other countries in Latin America, calaca also refers to death. Its most common cultural representation is the Catrina.

== Origins ==
=== Pre-Hispanic Mesoamerican period ===
The figures of skeletons, skulls, and bones have been used in Mexico since the pre-Hispanic Mesoamerican period, including Mayan and Aztec imagery. They have been used during death ceremonies and celebrations, which continue to be discovered and studied. In 2015, a group of researchers and archeologists performed an excavation in Mexico City, where the Templo Mayor used to be. They discovered 657 skulls, which were suggested to be part of a practice, known as tzompantli, to honor gods through sacrifice.

One of the gods honored by the Aztecs was Mictlantecuhtli, known as "Lord of the Land of the Dead". His representations in art include a skeleton covered in blood, sometimes wearing clothes and a hat. Mexican artists have taken inspiration in this god for the modern interpretation of the Calavera Catrina.

=== Spanish empire ===
This use of skulls and skeletons in cultural practices prevailed throughout the Spanish empire settlement in the region that later became Mexico. The Spanish introduction of Christianity influenced the calaca's cultural relevance and representation. During the 14th century, people celebrated the Holy Week through diverse traditions, including the decoration and burning of big Judas figures. This tradition was brought to Mexico, where some of these figures are represented with skeletons. Skeletons were also used as dance elements or characters involved in religious indoctrination practices from missionaries to indigenous people.

=== Mexican artists influence ===
Later, Mexican political lithographer José Guadalupe Posada's works inspired the modern interpretations of the calaca. These illustrations depicted social and political themes preceding Mexico's Revolution, using dressed moving skeletons in a mocking way. One of these figures was later named the Catrina, which can be traced back to 1930 in the pages of a book about Posada. Other artists, like Diego Rivera, helped popularize the calaca figure.

== Description ==
The word calaca is closely related to the Mexican calavera, which is a doublet of calvaria and calvary.

Calacas and calaveras are often seen as synonyms, but their usage depends on context. The calavera is more often used to refer to the skull, and it is a more popular term used to refer to the edible sugar calaveras that are an essential element of the Mexican Day of the Dead. In everyday talk, both words are used to name the allegorical figure of Death often known as La Calavera Catrina.

=== Symbolism ===
Day of the Dead celebration

The calaca is also a representation of death itself. It is widely used in the Mexican poems called calaveritas or literary calaveras, in celebration of the Day of the Dead traditions. These specific poems always convey death as the allegorical female character, Calavera Catrina, using creativity to refer to her through a wide range of adjectives and terms. This playful representation of death in Mexico, offers the calaca many coloquial synonyms people use to refer to death beyond just calaveritas. These terms include the Spanish translations of: the cold one, the chief, the skinny one, the bony one, the Holy Death, the sad one, the ugly one, the stiff one, the empty one, and many more.

=== Coloquial expressions ===
A popular phrase among Mexicans and those Latinos who personally know someone is "se le llevó la Calaca" ("the calaca/death took them") after someone has died or even grown distant, although this last one is less common. Calaca is also often used as a nickname for skinny people.

== Festivities and cultural relevance ==
Sugar skull known as "calaverita"

Calacas are frequently shown with marigold flowers and foliage, especially when used as part of the Day of the Dead festival traditions and celebrations. For festive purposes, calacas are generally colorful and vibrant. The traditions are built on the belief that the afterlife can be happy and joyful. For that reason, calacas are often depicted dancing or playing music.

Calacas used in the festival include calaveras, which are represented through a variety of art and figures such as carved skull masks worn by revelers, small figures made out of carved wood, stone, or fired clay, sweet treats in the form of skulls or skeletons like the sugar skulls, alebrijes, murals, and many other handmade crafts.

== Media appearances ==
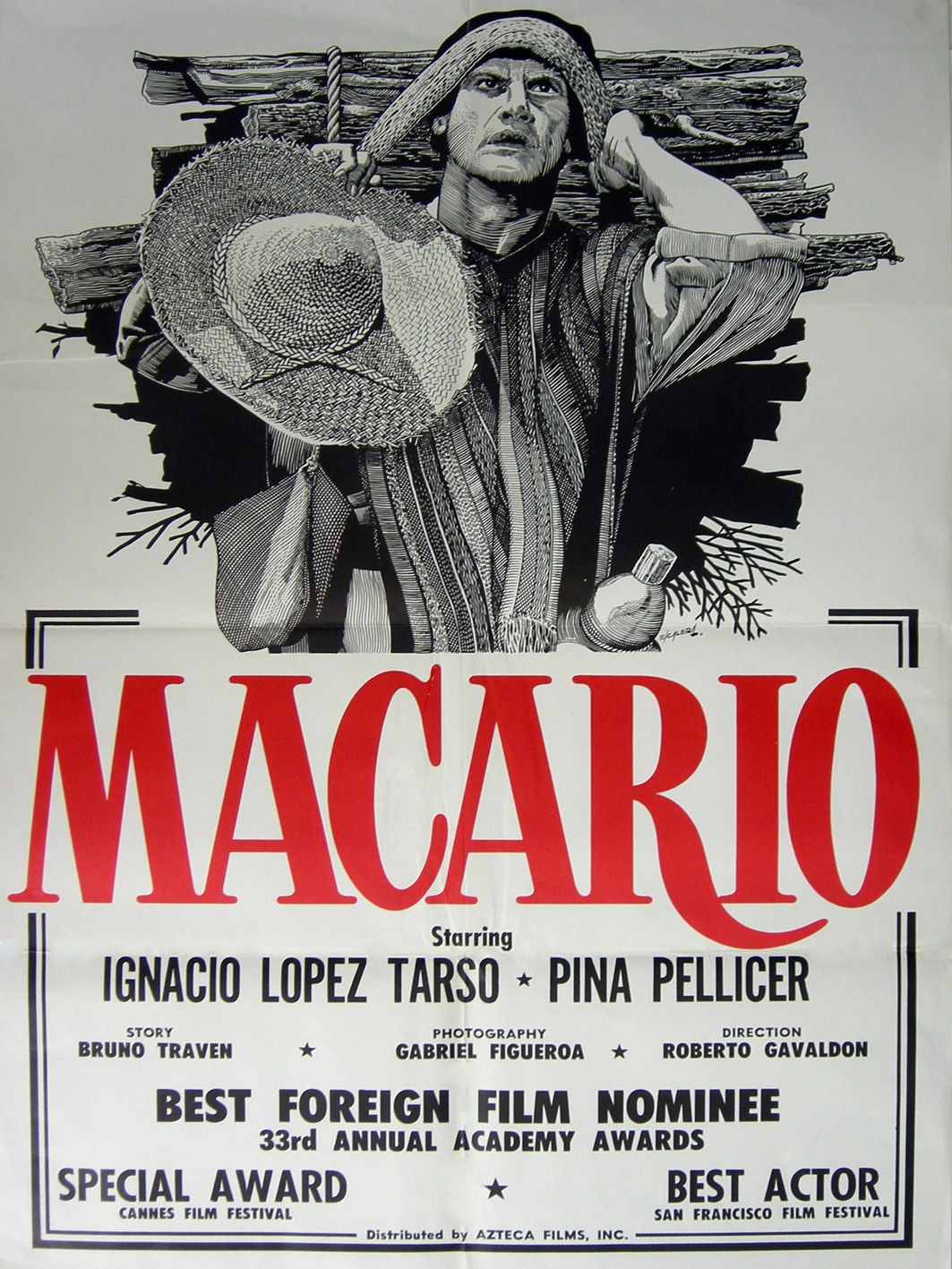
Macario film poster

Calacas are prominently featured as representations of the deceased in the animated films The Book of Life and Coco. In Coco, the main character Miguel is in a race against time to get his family's blessings before he turns into a calaca himself.

In El Tigre: The Adventures of Manny Rivera, the villain Santana of the Dead (voiced by Susan Silo) is a calaca and commands various calacas that are in her service.

The traditional giant paper-made calacas puppets used in festivals appear in the James Bond film Spectre.

Former mexican films, like Macario (1960), also include the depiction of calacas.

Other skeletons or calaca-like figures can be seen in the Tim Burton film Corpse Bride, video games such as LittleBigPlanet (2008), and Guacamelee! (2013), and the 1998 Tim Schafer computer game Grim Fandango.

== See also ==
- Calavera
- Cuco
- La Calavera Catrina
- Santa Muerte
