= NFL Quarterback Club 99 =

1998 video game

NFL Quarterback Club '99
- North American packaging cover featuring Brett Favre
- Developer: Iguana Entertainment
- Publisher: Acclaim Entertainment (Note: Released under the Acclaim Sports label)
- Series: NFL Quarterback Club
- Platform: Nintendo 64
- Release: NA: November 10, 1998; EU: December 1998
- Genre: Sports
- Modes: Single-player, multiplayer

NFL Quarterback Club '99 Is a sports game released in November 1998, developed by Iguana Entertainment and published by Acclaim Entertainment for Nintendo 64.

== Gameplay ==
The title is one of the first sports games to work with the Expansion Pak. The game features the ability to replay past Super Bowls and provides historical descriptions of them. NFL Quarterback Club '99 delivers all 31 teams and 3D rendered stadiums (also included are the Cleveland Browns). 1,500 players are featured in the game with over 250 motion-capture animations. Players, along with teams, uniforms, coaches, and playbooks can also be created and used in game.

The game features teams from NFL Europe.

== Development ==
As with the preceding game in the series, NFL Quarterback Club 98, Brett Favre served as the game's spokesman and cover player. Play-by-play was handled by Mike Patrick, color calls by Randy Cross and referee calls by Jerry Markbreit. Charlie Weis and Dedric Ward served as consultants for the game.

A PC version of NFL Quarterback Club 99 was in development.

== Reception ==
Reception

Aggregate score
Aggregator	Score
GameRankings	78%

Review scores
Publication	Score
AllGame	3/5
CNET Gamecenter	8/10
Consoles +	85%
Electronic Gaming Monthly	8/10
Game Informer	8.25/10
GamePro	3.5/5
GameSpot	7.5/10
Hyper	80%
IGN	8.4/10
N64 Magazine	90%
Nintendo Power	8.5/10

NFL Quarterback Club 99 received favorable reviews according to the review aggregation website GameRankings.

During the 2nd Annual Interactive Achievement Awards, the game was a finalist for "Console Sports Game of the Year" and "Outstanding Achievement in Software Engineering", both of which were ultimately awarded to 1080° Snowboarding and The Legend of Zelda: Ocarina of Time, respectively.
