= 2nd Annual Interactive Achievement Awards =

American video game awards

- Date: May 13, 1999
- Venue: Variety Arts Theater
- Country: Los Angeles, California, USA

Highlights
- Most awards: The Legend of Zelda: Ocarina of Time (6)
- Most nominations: The Legend of Zelda: Ocarina of Time; Half-Life (7)
- Game of the Year: The Legend of Zelda: Ocarina of Time
- Hall of Fame: Sid Meier

The 2nd Annual Interactive Achievement Awards was the 2nd edition of the Interactive Achievement Awards, an annual awards event that honored the best games in the video game industry within the last nine months of 1998 and the first two months of 1999. The awards were arranged by the Academy of Interactive Arts & Sciences (AIAS) and were held at the Variety Arts Theater in Los Angeles, California on May 13, 1999 during E3 1999. There was not an official host of the award ceremony, but featured a wide variety of presenters, including Sugar Ray Leonard, Bruno Campos, Kelly Hu, Zachery Ty Bryan, Ben Stein, David Gallagher, Coolio, Danica McKellar, Nicholle Tom and Chris Roberts.

The award for "Interactive Title of the Year" was renamed "Game of the Year". The award for "Outstanding Achievement in Character or Story Development" was introduced. There were some changes to the content awards for PC. Only finalists for "PC Action", "PC Adventure", "PC Role-Playing", "PC Simulation", "PC Sport", and "PC Strategy" were eligible for "Computer Game of the Year". "Family/Kids Title of the Year" was separated into "Children's Entertainment Title of the Year" and "Family Title of the Year". "Edutainment Title of the Year" and "Skills Building Title of the Year" were replaced with "Educational Title of the Year (0-8 years)" and "Educational Title of the Year (9-16 years)". The content award for "Online Game of the Year" was separated into three genre-specific online content awards for "Action/Strategy", "Role-Playing", and "Family/Board".

The Legend of Zelda: Ocarina of Time and Half-Life were tied with the most nominations. The Legend of Zelda: Ocarina of Time won the most awards of the ceremony, including "Game of the Year". Electronic Arts received the most nominations, along with the most nominated and award-winning games. Nintendo won the most awards as a developer and a publisher. There was also a tie between finalists for "PC Creativity Title of the Year" and "Online Family/Board Game of the Year". EA Canada and Nintendo EAD were the only developers with more than one award-winning game.

Sid Meier, creator of Civilization, was inducted into the Academy of Interactive Arts & Sciences Hall of Fame.

== Winners and Nominees ==
Winners are listed first, highlighted in boldface, and indicated with a double dagger (‡).

**Game of the Year**
- **The Legend of Zelda: Ocarina of Time** — **Nintendo EAD**‡
  - Banjo-Kazooie — Rare, Nintendo
  - Grim Fandango — LucasArts
  - Half-Life — Valve, Sierra On-Line
  - Metal Gear Solid — Konami
  - Sid Meier's Alpha Centauri — Firaxis Games, Electronic Arts
  - Star Wars: Rogue Squadron — Factor 5, LucasArts

=== Craft Awards ===
**Outstanding Achievement in Interactive Design**: **The Legend of Zelda: Ocarina of Time** — **Nintendo EAD**‡; Half-Life — Valve, Sierra On-Line; Metal Gear Solid — Konami; Pokémon Red and Blue — Game Freak, Nintendo; Sid Meier's Alpha Centauri — Firaxis Games, Electronic Arts	**Outstanding Achievement in Art/Graphics**: **Banjo-Kazooie** — **Rare**, **Nintendo**‡; Grim Fandango — LucasArts; Half-Life — Valve, Sierra On-Line; Spyro the Dragon — Insomniac Games, Sony Computer Entertainment
**Outstanding Achievement in Sound and Music**: **Road Rash 3D** — **Electronic Arts**‡; Grim Fandango — LucasArts; Heart of Darkness — Amazing Studio, Interplay Productions; Wild 9 — Shiny Entertainment, Interplay Productions	**Outstanding Achievement in Software Engineering**: **The Legend of Zelda: Ocarina of Time** — **Nintendo EAD**‡; Half-Life — Valve, Sierra On-Line; Metal Gear Solid - Konami; Motocross Madness — Rainbow Studios, Microsoft; NFL Quarterback Club 99 — Iguana Entertainment, Acclaim Entertainment
**Outstanding Achievement in Character or Story Development**: **Pokémon Red and Blue** — **Game Freak**, **Nintendo**‡; Grim Fandango — LucasArts; Half-Life — Valve, Sierra On-Line; King's Quest: Mask of Eternity — Sierra On-Line; Metal Gear Solid — Konami; Sanitarium — DreamForge Intertainment, ASC Games; The Legend of Zelda: Ocarina of Time — Nintendo EAD; The X-Files Game — HyperBole Studios, Fox Interactive

=== Content Awards ===
==== Console ====
**Console Game of the Year (Note: All finalists for a console genre award were nominated for Console Game of the Year.)**: **The Legend of Zelda: Ocarina of Time** — **Nintendo EAD**‡
**Console Action Game of the Year**: **Banjo-Kazooie** — **Rare**, **Nintendo**‡; Metal Gear Solid — Konami; Parasite Eve — SquareSoft, Square Electronic Arts; Spyro the Dragon — Insomniac Games, Sony Computer Entertainment; Tenchu: Stealth Assassins — Acquire, Activision	**Console Adventure Game of the Year**: **The Legend of Zelda: Ocarina of Time** — **Nintendo EAD**‡; Banjo-Kazooie — Rare, Nintendo; MediEvil — SCE Studio Cambridge; Oddworld: Abe's Exoddus — Oddworld Inhabitants, GT Interactive
**Console Fighting Game of the Year**: **WCW/nWo Revenge** — **AKI Corporation**, **THQ**‡; Bushido Blade 2 — Lightweight, Square Electronic Arts; WWF War Zone — Iguana West, Acclaim Entertainment	**Console Racing Game of the Year**: **Gran Turismo** — **Polyphony Digital**, **Sony Computer Entertainment**‡; Extreme-G 2 — Probe Entertainment, Acclaim Entertainment; F-Zero X — Nintendo EAD; Need for Speed III: Hot Pursuit — EA Canada/Seattle
**Console Role-Playing Game of the Year**: **The Legend of Zelda: Ocarina of Time** — **Nintendo EAD**‡; Panzer Dragoon Saga — Sega, Team Andromeda; Parasite Eve — SquareSoft, Square Electronic Arts; Pokémon Red and Blue — Game Freak, Nintendo	**Console Sports Game of the Year**: **1080° Snowboarding** — **Nintendo EAD**‡; Hot Shot Golf — Camelot Software Planning, Sony Computer Entertainment; Kobe Bryant in NBA Courtside — Left Field Productions, Nintendo; NFL Blitz — Midway Games; NFL Quarterback Club 99 — Iguana Entertainment, Acclaim Entertainment

==== Personal Computer ====
**Computer Game of the Year (Note: Finalists for "Action", "Adventure", "Role-Playing", "Simulation", "Sports", and "Strategy" were eligible for this category.)**: **Half-Life** — **Valve**, **Sierra On-Line**‡
**PC Action Game of the Year**: **Half-Life** — **Valve**, **Sierra On-Line**‡; Starsiege: Tribes — Dynamix, Sierra On-Line; Tom Clancy's Rainbow Six — Red Storm Entertainment; Unreal — Epic Games, Digital Extremes, GT Interactive	**PC Adventure Game of the Year**: **Grim Fandango** — **LucasArts**‡; Dark Side of the Moon: A Sci-Fi Adventure — SouthPeak Interactive; King's Quest: Mask of Eternity — Sierra On-Line; Sanitarium — DreamForge Intertainment, ASC Games; Starship Titanic — The Digital Village, Simon & Schuster Interactive; The X-Files Game — HyperBole Studios, Fox Interactive
**PC Role-Playing Game of the Year**: **Baldur's Gate** — **BioWare**, **Black Isle Studios**, **Interplay Productions**‡; Fallout 2 — Black Isle Studios, Interplay Productions; Might and Magic VI: The Mandate of Heaven — New World Computing, The 3DO Company; Return to Krondor — PyroTechnix, Sierra On-Line	**PC Simulation Game of the Year**: **Need for Speed III: Hot Pursuit** — **EA Canada/Seattle**‡; F-22 Total Air War — Digital Image Design, Infogrames; Descent: FreeSpace — The Great War — Volition, Interplay Productions; Independence War — Particle Systems, Infogrames; Jane's WWII Fighters — Jane's Combat Simulations, Electronic Arts
**PC Sports Game of the Year**: **FIFA 99** — **EA Canada**‡; Links LS 1999 — Access Software; Madden NFL 99 — EA Tiburon; Motocross Madness — Rainbow Studios, Microsoft; NASCAR Revolution — Stormfront Studios, Electronic Arts	**PC Strategy Game of the Year**: **Sid Meier's Alpha Centauri** — **Firaxis Games**, **Electronic Arts**‡; Caesar III — Impressions Games, Sierra On-Line; Close Combat III: The Russian Front — Atomic Games, Microsoft; MechCommander — FASA Interactive, MicroProse; SimCity 3000 — Maxis, Electronic Arts
**PC Creativity Title of the Year (Note: Tie between finalists.)**: **3D Castle Creator** — **ImageBuilder Software**, **IBM**‡; **Barbie Photo Designer Digital Camera and CD-Rom** — **Gorilla**, **Mattel Media**‡; American Greetings Craft Deluxe — American Greetings, Broderbund; Cosmopolitan Virtual Makeover — Motion Works, Broderbund; PrintMaster Platinum 7.0 — Broderbund	**PC Children's Entertainment Title of the Year**: **A Bug's Life** — **Traveller's Tales**, **Disney Interactive**‡; Barbie Riding Club — Human Code, Mattel Media; Blue's Birthday Adventure — Humongous Entertainment; Dr. Brain Thinking Games: IQ Adventure — Knowledge Adventure; Lego Creator — Superscape, Lego Media; Rugrats Adventure Game — Broderbund; Starfire Soccer Challenge — Purple Moon, Stormfront Studios
**PC Family Title of the Year**: **National Geographic Maps: The Complete Collection** — **Broderbund**, **National Geographic Society**‡; 3-D Ultra NASCAR Pinball — Dynamix, Sierra On-Line; Looney Tunes: Cosmic Capers — Animated Jigsaws — SouthPeak Interactive; Star Wars: Behind the Magic — LucasArts; The D Show — Cyberflix, Disney Interactive	**PC Educational Title of the Year (0-8 years)**: **JumpStart Preschool** — **Knowledge Adventure**‡; Blue's Birthday Adventure — Humongous Entertainment; Disney's Adventures in Typing with Timon and Pumbaa — Disney Interactive; Dr. Seuss Preschool — The Learning Company; Elmo's Reading: Preschool and Kindergarten — Children's Television Workshop, The Learning Company; Reader Rabbit Math Ages 6-9 — The Learning Company
**PC Educational Title of the Year (9-16 years)**: **Thinkin' Science Series: ZAP!** — **Edmark**‡; Journey Into the Brain — Morphonix; JumpStart Adventures 6th Grade: Mission Earthquest — Knowledge Adventure; National Geographic Maps: The Complete Collection — Broderbund, National Geographic Society; Star Wars: Droid Works — Lucas Learning, LucasArts

==== Online ====
**Online Action/Strategy Game of the Year**: **Starsiege: Tribes** — **Dynamix**, **Sierra On-Line**‡; Air Warrior III — Kesmai, Interactive Magic; CyberStrike 2 — Simutronics, 989 Studios
**Online Family/Board Game of the Year**: **Multiplayer Jeopardy! Online** — **Sony Online Entertainment**‡; **What's the Big Idea?** — **Berkeley Systems**‡; Multiplayer Wheel of Fortune Online — Sony Online Entertainment; The Game of Life — Mass Media Games, Hasbro Interactive	**Online Role-Playing Game of the Year**: **Ultima Online: The Second Age** — **Origin Systems**, **Electronic Arts**‡; DragonRealms: Maritime Expansion — Simutronics; Meridian 59: Dark Auspices — Archetype Interactive, The 3DO Company
**Online Entertainment Site of the Year**: **GameSpot.com**‡; Comedy Central Online — Comedy Central; MSN Gaming Zone; Uproar.com	**Online News/Information Site of the Year**: **CNN.com/Cold War**‡; CNN.com; GameSpot.com; MediaNewsweek.com; Metromix.com; The New York Times on the Web; The Wall Street Journal Interactive Edition

=== Hall of Fame Award ===
- Sid Meier

=== Multiple nominations and awards ===
==== Multiple Nominations ====
Any game that was nominated for a console genre award was also a nominee for "Console Game of the Year". Only finalists for "PC Action", "PC Adventure", "PC Role-Playing", "PC Simulation", "PC Sports", and "PC Strategy" were eligible for "Computer Game of the Year".

Games that received multiple nominations
Nominations	Game
7	Half-Life
7	The Legend of Zelda: Ocarina of Time
6	Grim Fandango
6	Metal Gear Solid
5	Banjo-Kazooie
4	Need for Speed III: Hot Pursuit
4	Pokémon Red and Blue
4	Sid Meier's Alpha Centauri
3	King's Quest: Mask of Eternity
3	Motocross Madness
3	NFL Quarterback Club 99
3	Parasite Eve
3	Sanitarium
3	Spyro the Dragon
3	Starsiege: Tribes
3	The X-Files Game
2 (Note: Only listing finalists that were neither eligible for "Console Game of the Year" nor "Computer Game of the Year".)	Blue's Birthday Adventure
2	GameSpot.com
2	National Geographic Maps: The Complete Collection

Nominations by company
Nominations	Games	Company
25	11	Electronic Arts
22	6	Nintendo
19	6	Sierra On-Line
11	5	Sony Computer Entertainment
11	4	LucasArts
8	5	Interplay Productions
7	3	Acclaim Entertainment
7	1	Valve
6	5	Broderbund
6	1	Konami
5	2	Iguana Entertainment
5	2	Microsoft
5	1	Rare
4	2	Black Isle Studios
4	2	Dynamix
4	2	GT Interactive
4	2	Infogrames
4	1	Firaxis Games
4	1	Game Freak
3	3	Disney Interactive
3	3	Knowledge Adventure
3	3	The Learning Company
3	2	The 3DO Company
3	2	Stormfront Studios
3	1	ASC Games
3	1	DreamForge Intertainment
3	1	Fox Interactive
3	1	HyperBole Studios
3	1	Insomniac Games
3	1	Rainbow Studios
3	1	SquareSoft
2 (Note: Only listing companies that did not have a game eligible for either "Console Game of the Year" or "Computer Game of the Year".)	2	Mattel Media
2	2	SouthPeak Interactive
2	1	Humongous Entertainment
2	1	Simutronics
2	1	GameSpot

==== Multiple Awards ====
Games that received multiple awards
Awards	Game
6	The Legend of Zelda: Ocarina of Time
2	Banjo-Kazooie
2	Half-Life

Awards by company
Awards	Games	Company
10	4	Nintendo
5	5	Electronic Arts
3	2	Sierra On-Line
2	2	Sony Computer Entertainment
2	1	Rare
2	1	Valve
