= Ben Houge =

- Born: 1974 (age 51–52); York, Nebraska, U.S.
- Genres: Video game music, orchestral, vocal, classical, chamber, liturgical, ambient
- Occupations: Composer, musician, sound designer, film scorer
- Years active: 1996-present
- Website: benhouge.com

Ben Houge (/hoʊɡ/; born 1974) is an American composer and audio designer. He has worked on many projects, including composing music and designing audio for video games since 1996. He contributed to popular titles during his seven years of association with Sierra On-Line including developing audio for the Half-Life series and Arcanum: Of Steamworks and Magick Obscura. In 2003, Houge left Sierra to work as a freelance audio designer and later joined the video game corporation Ubisoft. Much of his work employs computers to make decisions and generate sound, and he has incorporated ideas from his experience in digital media into compositions for live performance. He received his Bachelor of Arts degree (B.A.) in Music Theory from St. Olaf College and his Master of Music degree (M.M.) from the University of Washington and is currently an assistant professor at Berklee College of Music.

Houge's work on "food operas," that is, electronic music environments for dining that adapt to the dishes and courses being served to each dinner or table of dinners, has been extensively noted in the press.

== Discography ==
- The Tomb of the Grammarian Lysias (2014)
- Chroma (Cancelled), Harmonix
- Defense Grid: You Monster (2011), Hidden Path Entertainment
- Tom Clancy's EndWar (2008), Ubisoft
- Brothers in Arms: Road to Hill 30 (2005), Ubisoft
- Half-Life (PlayStation 2) (2001), Sierra On-Line
- Arcanum: Of Steamworks and Magick Obscura (2001), Sierra On-Line
- Half-Life: Blue Shift (2001), Sierra On-Line
- Ground Control (2000), Sierra On-Line
- SWAT 3: Close Quarters Battle (1999), Sierra On-Line
- Half-Life: Opposing Force (1999), Sierra On-Line
- Gabriel Knight 3: Blood of the Sacred, Blood of the Damned (1999), Sierra On-Line
- King's Quest: Mask of Eternity (1998), Sierra On-Line
- Leisure Suit Larry's Casino (1998), Sierra On-Line
- Sierra's 'splash' screen (1998-2001), Sierra On-Line
- Leisure Suit Larry: Love for Sail! (1996), Sierra On-Line
- Mythica (Cancelled), Microsoft Studios
- Hoyle Casino Empire (2002), Sierra On-Line
- Jonny Drama (Cancelled), Sierra On-Line
