= Grim Fandango =

1998 video game

- Developer: LucasArts (Note: Remastered version developed by Double Fine Productions)
- Publisher: LucasArts (Note: Remastered version published by Double Fine Productions; Xbox One remastered version published by Xbox Game Studios.)
- Director: Tim Schafer
- Programmer: Bret Mogilefsky
- Artist: Peter Tsacle
- Writer: Tim Schafer
- Composer: Peter McConnell
- Engine: GrimE
- Platforms: Windows; Linux; OS X; PlayStation 4; PlayStation Vita; Android; iOS; Nintendo Switch; Xbox One
- Release: October 30, 1998: Windows; NA: October 30, 1998; EU: November 1998; Remastered; Linux, OS X, PS4, Vita, Win; WW: January 27, 2015 Android, iOS; WW: May 5, 2015 Nintendo Switch; WW: November 1, 2018 Xbox One; WW: October 29, 2020
- Genre: Graphic adventure
- Mode: Single-player

Grim Fandango is a 1998 adventure game directed by Tim Schafer and developed and published by LucasArts for Microsoft Windows. It is the first adventure game by LucasArts to use 3D computer graphics overlaid on pre-rendered static backgrounds. As with other LucasArts adventure games, the player must converse with characters and examine, collect, and use objects to solve puzzles.

Grim Fandango is set in the Land of the Dead in a retro-futuristic version of the 1950s, through which recently departed souls, represented as calaca-like figures, travel before they reach their final destination. The story follows travel agent Manuel "Manny" Calavera as he attempts to guide a new arrival, Mercedes "Meche" Colomar, on her journey. The game combines elements of the Aztec afterlife with film noir style, with influences including The Maltese Falcon, On the Waterfront and Casablanca.

Grim Fandango received praise for its art design and direction. It was selected for several awards and is often listed as one of the greatest video games. However, it was a commercial failure and contributed towards LucasArts' decision to end adventure game development and the decline of the adventure game genre.

In 2014, with help from Sony, Schafer's studio Double Fine Productions acquired the Grim Fandango license following Disney's acquisition and closure of LucasArts as a game developer the previous year. Double Fine produced a remastered version, featuring improved character graphics, controls (including point and click), an orchestrated score, and director's commentary. It was released for Linux, OS X, PlayStation 4, PlayStation Vita, and Windows in January 2015, for Android and iOS in May 2015, for Nintendo Switch in November 2018, and for Xbox One in October 2020.

== Gameplay ==
Grim Fandango is an adventure game, in which the player controls Manuel "Manny" Calavera (calavera being Spanish for 'skull') as he follows Mercedes "Meche" Colomar in the Underworld. It uses the GrimE engine, pre-rendering static backgrounds from 3D models, while the main objects and characters are animated in 3D. Additionally, cutscenes are pre-rendered in 3D. The player controls Manny's movements and actions with a keyboard, a joystick, or a gamepad. The remastered edition allows control via a mouse as well. Manny must collect objects that can be used with either other collectible objects, parts of the scenery, or with other people in the Land of the Dead to solve puzzles and progress. The game has no HUD. Unlike the earlier 2D LucasArts games, the player is informed of objects or persons of interest not by text floating on the screen when the player passes a cursor over them, but instead by the fact that Manny will turn his head toward that object or person as he walks by. The player reviews the inventory of items that Manny has collected by watching him pull each item in and out of his coat jacket. Manny can engage in dialogue with other characters through conversation trees to gain hints of what needs to be done to solve the puzzles or to progress the plot. As in most LucasArts adventure games, the player can never die or otherwise get into a no-win situation.

== Synopsis ==
=== Setting ===
Grim Fandango takes place in the Land of the Dead (the Eighth Underworld), where recently departed souls aim to make their way to the Land of Eternal Rest (the Ninth Underworld) on the Four Year Journey of the Soul. Good deeds in life are rewarded by access to better travel packages, provided by the Department of Death, to assist in making the journey (such as sports cars and luxury ocean cruises), the best of which is the Number Nine, an express train that takes four minutes to reach the gate to the Ninth Underworld. However, souls who did not lead a kind life are left to travel through the Land of the Dead on foot, which would take around four years. Such souls often lose faith in the existence of the Ninth Underworld and instead find jobs and stay in the Land of the Dead. The travel agents of the Department of Death act as Grim Reapers to escort the souls from the Land of the Living to the Land of the Dead, and then determine which mode of transport the soul has merited. Each year on the Day of the Dead, these souls are allowed to visit their families in the Land of the Living.

The souls in the Land of the Dead appear as skeletal calaca figures. Alongside them are demons that have been summoned to help with the more mundane tasks of day-to-day life, such as vehicle maintenance and even drink service. The souls themselves can suffer death-within-death by being "sprouted", the result of being shot with "sproutella"-filled darts that cause flowers to grow out through bones, rapidly feeding off the calcium of the soul's skeleton. The ones who are sprouted are reincarnated. Many of the characters are Mexican and occasional Spanish words are interspersed into the English dialogue, resulting in Spanglish. Many of the characters smoke, following a film noir tradition; the manual asks players to consider that every smoker in the game is dead.

=== Plot ===
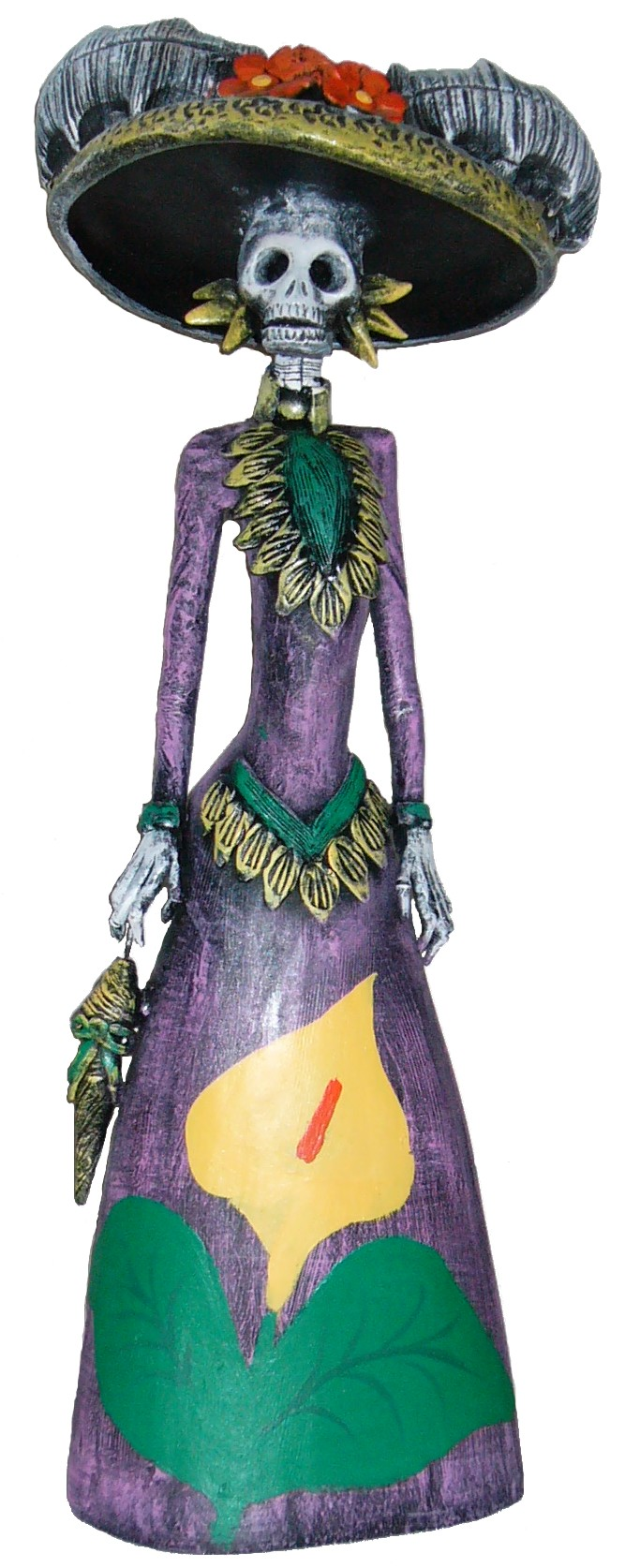
The characters in Grim Fandango are based on Mexican calaca figures used to celebrate the Day of the Dead.

Grim Fandago is divided into four acts, each taking place on November 2 (the Day of the Dead) in four consecutive years. Manuel "Manny" Calavera is a travel agent at the Department of Death in the city of El Marrow, forced into his job to work off a debt "to the powers that be". Manny, who used to be a top sales agent, is frustrated with being assigned clients who do not qualify for "premium" travel packages due to their poor living choices and must take the full four-year journey. Manny is threatened to be fired by his boss, Don Copal, if he does not come up with better sales, so Manny steals a client, Mercedes "Meche" Colomar, from his successful co-worker Domino Hurley. The Department computers assign Meche to the four-year journey even though Manny believes she should have a guaranteed spot on the "Number Nine" luxury express train due to her pureness of heart in her life. Manny asks Meche to wait for him to sort out the mistake, but while he is discussing the matter with Copal, Meche, overcome with guilt, starts her journey on foot by herself. Don Copal uses it as a reason to arrest Manny. Manny is freed from arrest and sprouting by Salvador "Sal" Limones, the leader of the small underground organization the Lost Souls Alliance (LSA), who warns him of Domino and Don rigging the system to deny many clients Double N tickets, hoarding them for the boss of the criminal underworld, Hector LeMans. LeMans then sells the tickets at an exorbitant price to those that can afford it. Sal recruits Manny to help LSA by setting up a system of pigeon mail and providing the group with biometrics of Manny in order to access the computer systems of the Department. Manny recognizes that he cannot stop Hector at present and instead, with the help of his driver and speed demon Glottis, he tries to find Meche on her journey in the nearby Petrified Forest. Manny arrives at the small port city of Rubacava and finds that he has beaten Meche there, and waits for her to arrive.

The cast of Grim Fandango. In the front-center are Domino, Meche, Manny, and Sal. Glottis is in the upper left and Hector is on the far right. The creator, Tim Schafer, is in the bottom-left corner.

A year passes, and the city of Rubacava has grown. Manny now runs his own nightclub off a converted automat near the edge of the Forest. Manny sees Meche leaving the port with Domino, but when he tries to stop them, he is stopped by Meche. Manny learns from Olivia Ofrenda, the owner of the beatnik Blue Casket nightclub, that Don has been sprouted for letting the scandal be known.

Manny gives chase, manages to get on board of a leaving ship as a janitor, and a year later (after being promoted to a captain) tracks them to a coral mining plant on the Edge of the World. Domino has been holding Meche there as a trap to lure Manny. All of Domino's clients who had their tickets stolen are also being held there and used as slave labor, both to make a profit with the coral mining and as a way to keep Hector's scandal quiet. Domino tries to convince Manny to take over his position in the plant seeing as he has no alternative and can spend the rest of eternity with Meche but he refuses. After rescuing Meche, Manny defeats Domino by causing him to fall into a rock crusher. Manny, along with Meche, Glottis and a few of the souls being held at the plant then escape from the Edge of the World.

The three travel for another year until they reach the terminus for the Number Nine train at the gate of the Ninth Underworld. The Gate Keeper to the Ninth Underworld won't let the souls progress without their tickets, mistakenly believing they have sold them, and it's further revealed that a wicked soul that has either not paid off their debt or tried to cheat the Gate Keeper with a fake or stolen Double N Ticket to gain entrance to the Ninth Underworld will cause the express train to transform into the hell train (which sends all souls on board to hell). Meanwhile, Glottis has fallen deathly ill. Manny learns from demons stationed at the terminus that the only way to revive Glottis is to travel at high speeds to restore Glottis' purpose for being summoned. Manny and the others devise a makeshift fuel source to create a "rocket" train cart, quickly taking Manny and Meche back to Rubacava and saving Glottis' life. The three return to El Marrow, now found to be fully in Hector's control and renamed as Nuevo Marrow. Manny regroups with Sal and his expanded LSA and with the help of Olivia, who volunteered to join the gang earlier in Rubacava, and is able to learn about Hector's current activities. Further investigation reveals that Hector not only has been hoarding the Number Nine tickets, but has created counterfeit versions that he has sold to others while keeping the real tickets for himself in a desperate attempt to balance out his sinful life and get out of the Land of the Dead. Manny tries to confront Hector but is lured into another trap by Olivia, who is revealed to be Hector's girlfriend, who has also captured Sal, and is taken to Hector's greenhouse to be sprouted. Manny is able to defeat Hector after Sal sacrifices himself to prevent Olivia from interfering.

Manny and Meche are able to find the real Double N tickets, including the one that Meche should have received. Manny makes sure the rest of the tickets are given to their rightful owners; in turn, he is granted his own ticket for his good deeds. Together, Manny and Meche board the Number Nine for their happy journey to the Ninth Underworld while Glottis waves tearfully goodbye.

== Development ==
=== Background and project inception ===
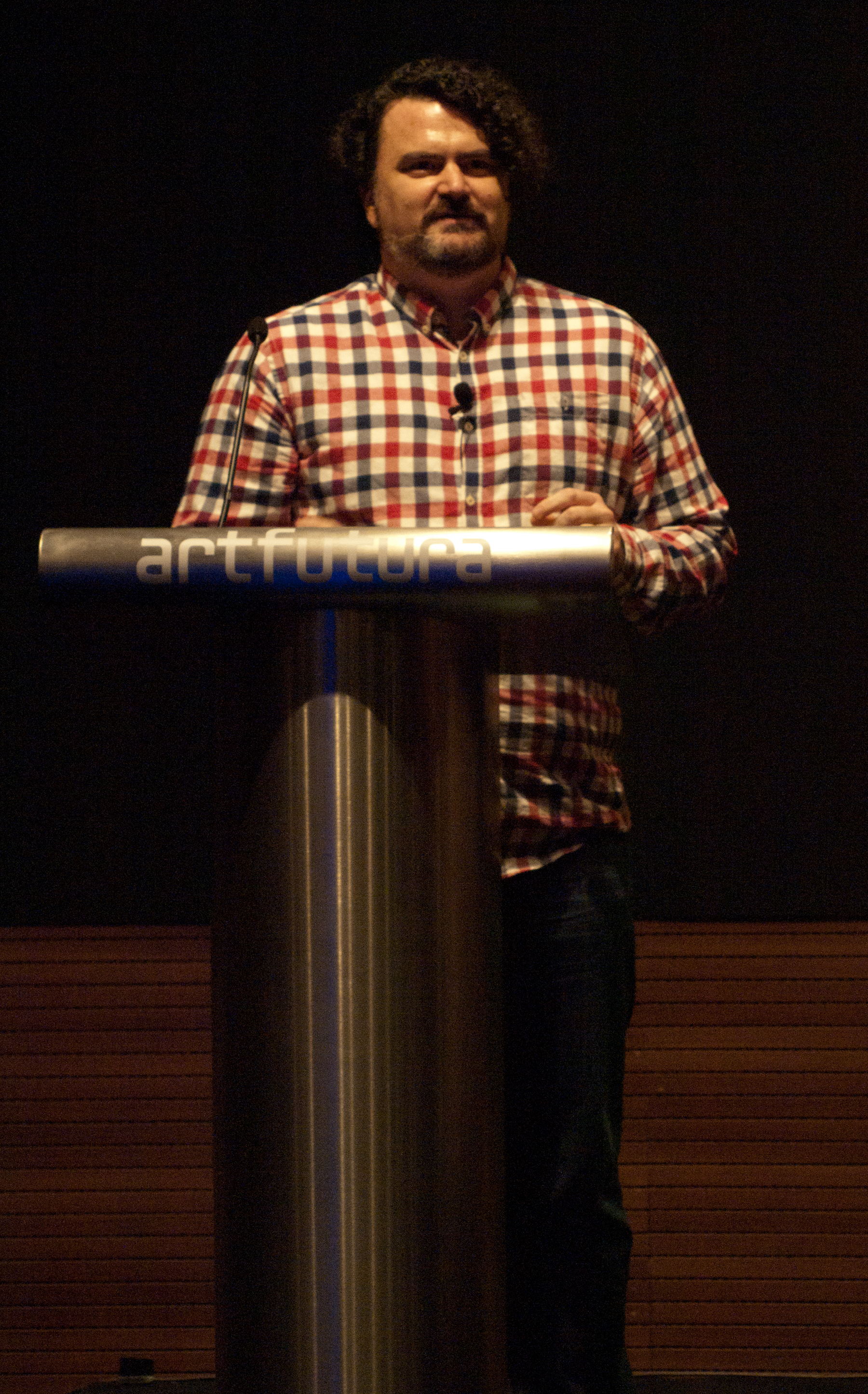
Tim Schafer was the project lead for Grim Fandango.

Grim Fandango's development was led by project leader Tim Schafer, co-designer of Day of the Tentacle and creator of Full Throttle and the more recent Psychonauts and Brütal Legend. Schafer had conceived a Day of the Dead-themed adventure before production of Full Throttle began, and he submitted both concepts to LucasArts for approval at the same time. Full Throttle was accepted instead because of its greater mainstream appeal; it became a hit and opened the way for Schafer to create Grim Fandango. Rogue Leaders: The Story of LucasArts noted that the pitching process for Grim Fandango was "a breeze" because of Schafer's earlier success, despite the new project's unusual theme.

Development began soon after the completion of Full Throttle in June 1995. Grim Fandango was an attempt by LucasArts to rejuvenate the graphic adventure genre, in decline by 1998. In response to complaints that Full Throttle was too short, Schafer set the goal of having twice as many puzzles as Full Throttle, which demanded a more lengthy and ambitious story to accommodate them. According to Schafer, Grim Fandago was developed on a $3 million budget. It was the first LucasArts adventure since Labyrinth not to use the SCUMM engine, instead using the Sith engine, pioneered by Jedi Knight: Dark Forces II, as the basis of the new GrimE engine. The GrimE engine was built using the scripting language Lua. This design decision was due to LucasArts programmer Bret Mogilefsky's interest in the language, and is considered one of the first uses of Lua in gaming applications. The success led to the language's use in many other games and applications, including Escape from Monkey Island and Baldur's Gate.

Manny's office, from Peter Chan's original concept art (top) to wireframe mesh (middle) to in-game representation (bottom)

=== 3D design ===
Grim Fandango mixed static pre-rendered background images with 3D characters and objects. Part of this decision was based on how the calaca figures would appear in three dimensions. There were more than 90 sets and 50 characters; Manny's character alone comprised 250 polygons. The development team found that by utilizing three-dimensional models to pre-render the backgrounds, they could alter the camera shot to achieve more effective or dramatic angles for certain scenes simply by re-rendering the background, instead of having to have an artist redraw the background for a traditional 2D adventure game. The team adapted the engine to allow Manny's head to move separately from his body to make the player aware of important objects nearby. The 3D engine also aided in the choreography between the spoken dialog and body and arm movements of the characters. Additionally, full motion video cutscenes were incorporated to advance the plot, using the same in-game style for the characters and backgrounds to make them nearly indistinguishable from the actual game.

=== Themes and influences ===
Grim Fandago combines several Aztec beliefs of the afterlife and underworld with 1930s Art Deco design motifs and a dark plot reminiscent of the film noir genre. The Aztec motifs were influenced by Schafer's decade-long fascination with folklore, stemming from an anthropology class he took at University of California Berkeley, and talks with folklorist Alan Dundes, with Schafer recognizing that the four-year journey of the soul in the afterlife would set the stage for an adventure game. Schafer stated that once he had set on the Afterlife setting: "Then I thought, what role would a person want to play in a Day of the Dead scenario? You'd want to be the grim reaper himself. That's how Manny got his job. Then I imagined him picking up people in the land of the living and bringing them to the land of the dead, like he's really just a glorified limo or taxi driver. So the idea came of Manny having this really mundane job that looks glamorous because he has the robe and the scythe, but really, he's just punching the clock". Schafer recounted a Mexican folklore about how the dead were buried with two bags of gold to be used in the afterlife, one on their chest and one hidden in their coffin, such that if the spirits in the afterlife stole the one on the chest, they would still have the hidden bag of gold; this idea of a criminal element in the afterlife led to the idea of a crime-ridden, film noir style to the world. The division of the game into four years was a way of breaking the overall puzzle into four discrete sections. Each year was divided into several non-linear branches of puzzles that all had to be solved before the player could progress to the next year.

The team created a puzzle design document in the planning, laying out branching non-linear puzzle paths for the player to solve within the context of each year of the game.

Schafer opted to give the conversation-heavy game the flavor of film noir set in the 1930s and 1940s, stating that "there's something that I feel is really honest about the way people talked that's different than modern movies". He was partially inspired by novels written by Raymond Chandler and Dashiell Hammett. Several film noir films were also inspirations. Tim Schafer stated that the true inspiration was drawn from films like Double Indemnity, in which a weak and undistinguished insurance salesman finds himself entangled in a murder plot. The design and early plot are fashioned after films such as Chinatown and Glengarry Glen Ross. Several scenes in Grim Fandango are directly inspired by the genre's films such as The Maltese Falcon, The Third Man, Key Largo, and most notably Casablanca: two characters in the second act are directly modeled after the roles played by Peter Lorre and Claude Rains in the film. The main villain, Hector LeMans, was designed to resemble Sydney Greenstreet's character of Signor Ferrari from Casablanca. His voice was also modeled after Greenstreet, complete with his trademark chuckle.

The skeletal character designs were based largely on the calaca figures used in Mexican Day of the Dead festivities, while the architecture ranged from Art Deco skyscrapers to an Aztec temple. The team turned to LucasArts artist Peter Chan to create the calaca figures. The art of Ed "Big Daddy" Roth was used as inspiration for the designs of the hot rods and the demon characters like Glottis.

Schafer proposed the title Deeds of the Dead, as he had originally planned Manny to be a real estate agent in the Land of the Dead. Other potential titles included The Long Siesta and Dirt Nap.

=== Voice cast ===
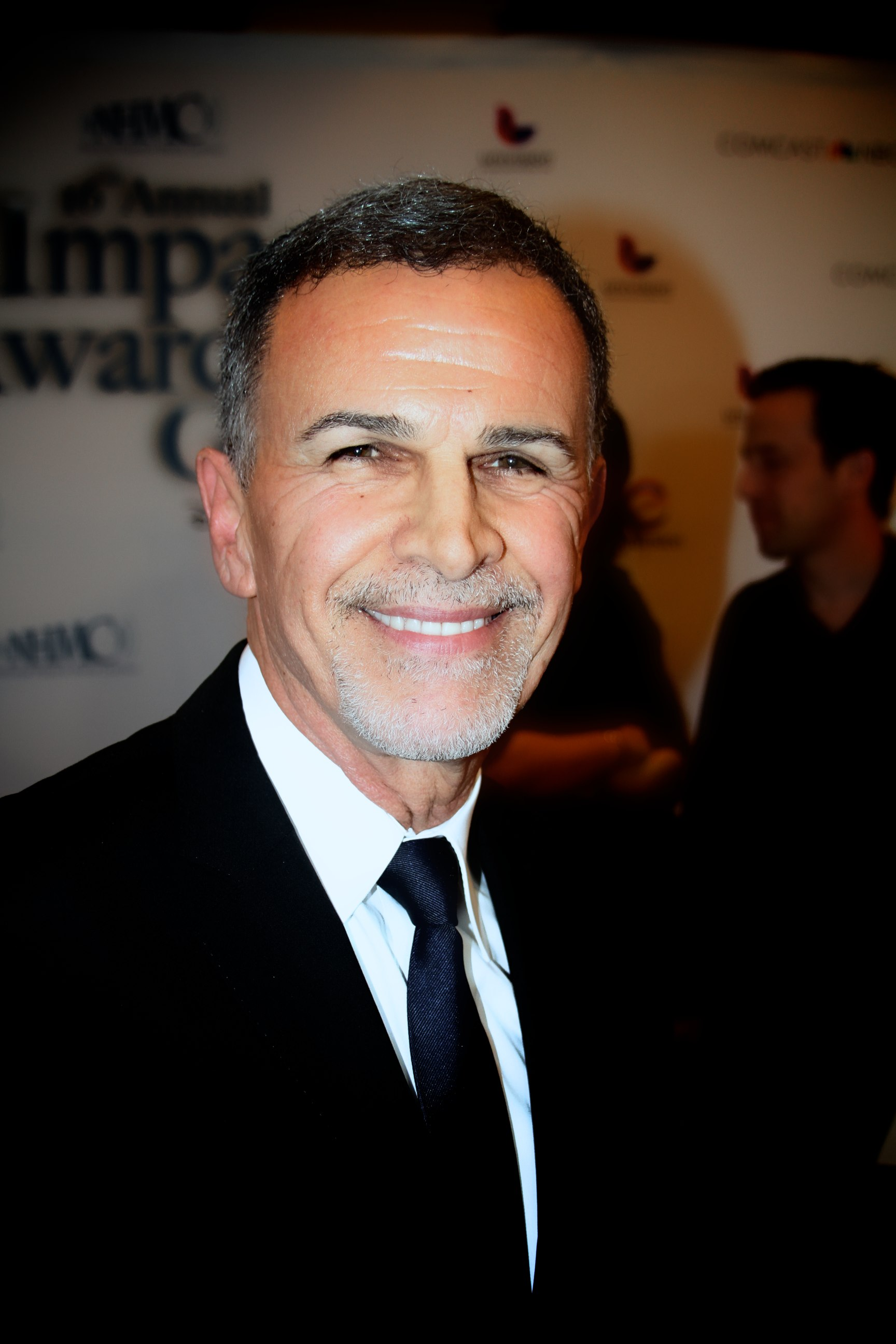
Tony Plana (pictured in 2013) provides the voice for Manny.

Grim Fandago featured a large voice cast, employing many Latino actors to help with the Spanish slang. Voice actors included Tony Plana as Manny, Maria Canals-Barrera as Meche, Alan Blumenfeld as Glottis, and Jim Ward as Hector. Schafer credits Plana for helping to deepen the character of Manny, as the voice actor was a native Spanish speaker and suggested alternate dialog for the game that was more natural for casual Spanish conversations. Schafer planned from the beginning for the voice cast to consist entirely of Latino performers.

=== Original release ===
Originally, Grim Fandago was to be shipped in the first half of 1998 but was delayed. It was shipped on October 28, 1998, for release on October 30, the Friday before November 2, the actual date of the Day of the Dead celebration. Even with the delay, the team had to drop several of the puzzles and characters, including a climactic five-step puzzle against Hector LeMans at the conclusion. Schafer said that they would have needed one to two more years to implement their original designs.

=== Remastered version ===
==== Acquisition of rights and announcement ====
A remastered version of Grim Fandango was released for Linux, OS X, PlayStation 4, PlayStation Vita, and Windows platforms on January 27, 2015. The PlayStation 4 and PlayStation Vita versions feature cross-buy and cross-save. It was later released for Android and iOS on May 5. The remastered version was released on PlayStation Plus in January 2016.

Schafer felt the need to make a new version of Grim Fandango because "always bugged me that people couldn't play it", as it was no longer for sale and it was unplayable on modern computers without fan-made emulators. The remastered version was predicated on the transition of LucasArts from a developer and publisher into a licensor and publisher in 2013 shortly after its acquisition by Disney. Under new management, LucasArts licensed several of its intellectual properties (IP), including Grim Fandango, to outside developers. Schafer was able to acquire the rights with financial assistance from Sony, and started the process of building out the remaster within Double Fine Productions. Schafer said that the sale of LucasArts to Disney had reminded them of the past efforts of former LucasArts president Darrell Rodriguez to release the older LucasArts games as Legacy Properties, such as the 2009 rerelease of The Secret of Monkey Island. Schafer also noted that they had tried to acquire the property from LucasArts in the years prior, but the frequent change in management stalled progress. When they began to inquire about the rights with Disney and LucasArts following its acquisition, they found that Sony, through their vice president of publisher and developer relations Adam Boyes, was also looking to acquire the rights. Boyes stated that Sony had been interested in working with a wide array of developers for the PlayStation 4, and was also inspired to seek Grim Fandango's after seeing developers like Capcom and Midway Games revive older properties. Boyes' determination was supported by John Vignocchi, VP of Production for Disney Interactive, who also shared memories of the game, and was able to bring in contacts to track down the assets. After discovering they were vying for the same property, Schafer and Boyes agreed to work together to acquire the IP and subsequent funding, planning to make the re-release a remastered version. Sony did not ask for any of IP rights, instead only asking Double Fine to give the PlayStation platforms console exclusivity in exchange for funding support, similar to their Pub Fund scheme they use to support independent developers.

==== Challenges ====
A comparison of Grim Fandango from its original release (top) and the remastered version. Double Fine increased texture resolution and improved lighting models to improve the looks of the characters.

A major complication in remastering the original work was having many of the critical game files go missing or on archaic formats. A large number of backup files were made on Digital Linear Tape (DLT) which Disney/LucasArts had been able to recover for Double Fine, but the company had no drives to read the tapes. Former LucasArts sound engineer Jory Prum had managed to save a DLT drive and was able to extract all of the audio development data from the tapes.

Schafer noted at the time of Grim Fandango's original development, retention of code was not as rigorous as present-day standards, and in some cases, Schafer believes the only copies of some files were unintentionally taken by employees when they had left LucasArts. As such, Schafer and his team have been going back through past employee records to try to trace down any of them and ask for any files they may have saved. In other cases, they have had difficulty in identifying elements on the low-resolution artwork of the original game, such as an emblem on one character's hat, and have had to go looking for original concept art to figure out the design.

Once original assets were identified, as to be used to present the "classic" look in the Remastered edition, Double Fine worked to improve the overall look for modern computers. The textures and lighting models for the characters were improved, in particular for Manny. Schafer has likened the remastering approach to the Criterion Collection film releases in providing a high-fidelity version without changing the story or the characters.

In addition to his own developers, Schafer reached out to players who had created unofficial patches and graphical improvements on the original game, and modifications needed to keep it running in ResidualVM, and gained their help to improve the assets for the remastered version. One such feature was a modified control scheme that converted the movement controls from the tank controls to a point and click-style interface. Schafer said the team used tank controls as it was popular with games such as Resident Evil at the time, but recognized it did not work well within the adventure game genre. Schafer contacted Tobias Pfaff who created the point-and-click modification to obtain access to his code to incorporate into the remastered version.

==== Later development and new features ====
Double Fine demonstrated an in-progress version of the remastered game at IndieCade event in October 2014; new features included higher-resolution textures and improved resolution for the character models as well as having real-time lighting models, and the ability to switch back and forth between this presentation and the original graphics at the touch of a control. The remastered game runs in 4:3 aspect ratio but has an option to stretch this to a 16:9 ratio rather than render in a native 4:3 ratio. The remaster includes improvements to the control scheme developed by Pfaff's patch and other alternate control schemes in addition to the original tank like controls, including analogue controls for console versions and point-and-click controls for computer versions. The soundtrack was fully orchestrated through performances of the Melbourne Symphony Orchestra (who also performed the soundtrack for Double Fine's Broken Age). The remastered version also includes developer commentary, which can be activated via the options menu and listened to at various points. The PlayStation version also features cloud saving between the PS4 and Vita versions. A Nintendo Switch port was released on November 1, 2018. Double Fine was acquired by Xbox Game Studios in 2019, and Grim Fandango for the Xbox One arrived in 2020.

== Soundtrack ==
=== Original soundtrack ===
A sample of the "Casino Calavera" track as heard on the remastered soundtrack. In the first release, IGN noted that "LucasArts has put together a film class soundtrack that uses a blend of simple jazz and classical Mexican themes to add depth to the atmosphere of an already fantastic title. Not only is the soundtrack not annoying, but once again it is used to reinforce the emotions delivered in various sequences of the game."

Grim Fandango has an original soundtrack that combines orchestral score, South American folk music, jazz, bebop, swing, and big band music, inspired by the likes of Duke Ellington and Benny Goodman as well as film composers Max Steiner and Adolph Deutsch. It also has various influences from traditional Russian, Celtic, Mexican, Spanish, and Indian strings culture. It was composed and produced by Peter McConnell at LucasArts. Others credited are Jeff Kliment (Engineer, Mixed By, Mastered), and Hans Christian Reumschüssel (Additional Music Production). The score featured live musicians that McConnell knew or made contact with in San Francisco's Mission District, including a mariachi band. The soundtrack was released as a CD in 1998.

The soundtrack was well received. IGN called it a "beautiful soundtrack that you'll find yourself listening to even after you're done with the game". SEMO said "the compositions and performances are so good that listening to this album on a stand-alone basis can make people feel like they're in a bar back then". RPGFan said "the pieces are beautifully composed, wonderfully played ... has a stellar soundtrack with music that easily stands alone outside the context of the game. This CD was an absolute pleasure to listen to and comes highly recommended". Game Revolution in its game review praised as one of the "most memorable soundtracks ever to grace the inside of a cranial cavity where an eardrum used to be". PC Gamer in its 2014 list of Top 100 Games, acclaimed Grim Fandango for including "one of the best soundtracks in PC gaming history". In 2017 Fact magazine also listed it as one of the "100 best video game soundtracks of all time".

In 1999's Academy of Interactive Arts & Sciences' Interactive Achievement Awards, the soundtrack was nominated in the category of "Outstanding Achievement in Sound and Music". It was also lauded by GameSpot, which awarded it the "Best PC Music awards", and included it in the "Ten Best PC Game Soundtracks" list in 1999.

=== Remastered soundtrack ===
After the original Pro Tools sound files were recovered, Peter McConnell found that some of the samples he had used originally did not sound good, and the team opted to re-orchestrate the score. The soundtrack was fully orchestrated through performances of the Melbourne Symphony Orchestra for the remastered version.

The re-made soundtrack was produced under Nile Rodgers' label Sumthing Else. It had a standard release of 37 tracks, as well as a Director's Cut with 14 extra tracks (the latter sold exclusively through Sumthing Else). It included the original score from the LucasArts archives, new compositions by Peter McConnell and new orchestral arrangements, as well as new extended versions of jazz pieces re-mixed at Sony Computer Entertainment America. In 2018, celebrating the 20th anniversary of the original release, the soundtrack was released for the first time in vinyl format.

== Reception ==
=== Reviews ===
Grim Fandango (1998)

Aggregate score
Aggregator	Score
Metacritic	94/100

Review scores
Publication	Score
Adventure Gamers	4.5/5
AllGame	4.5/5
Edge	9/10
GameRevolution	A−
GameSpot	9.3/10
IGN	9.4/10
Next Generation	5/5
PC Gamer (US)	91%
PC Zone	9/10

Grim Fandango gained acclaim. The aggregating review website Metacritic gave it a score of 94/100. Critics lauded the art direction in particular, with GameSpot rating the visual design as "consistently great". PC Zone emphasized the production as a whole calling the direction, costumes, characters, music, and atmosphere expertly done. They also said it would make a "superb film". The San Francisco Chronicle stated "Grim Fandango feels like a wild dance through a cartoonish film-noir adventure. Its wacky characters, seductive puzzle-filled plot and a nearly invisible interface allow players to lose themselves in the game just as cinemagoers might get lost in a movie." The Houston Chronicle, in naming Grim Fandango the best game of 1998 along with Half-Life, said the graphics were "jaw-dropping" and said it was "full of both dark and light humor". IGN said Grim Fandago was the best adventure game it had ever seen. Next Generation wrote that "Grim Fandango is a smart, beautiful, and enjoyable adventure game that will leave you holding your breath waiting for Grim Fandango 2".

Several reviewers had difficulties with the interface, saying it requires a learning curve, and found some camera angles poorly chosen. The use of elevators was particularly noted as troublesome. The review from Adventure Gamers expressed dislike of the soundtrack, and, at times, "found it too heavy and not well suited to the game's theme". Computer and Video Games found that the continuous and long data loading from the CD-ROM "spoils the fluidity of some sequences and causes niggling delays".

=== Awards ===
In 1998, PC Gamer and IGN named Grim Fandango the best adventure game of the year. It won the GameSpot awards for "Best of E3 1998", "PC Adventure Game of the Year", "PC Game of the Year", "Best PC Graphics for Artistic Design", and "Best PC Music". GameSpot named Grim Fandango its game of the year. In 2014, it included its soundtrack in the list of the 10 best PC game soundtracks and GameSpot readers named its ending the 10th-best of a PC game.

In 1999, at the 2nd Annual Interactive Achievement Awards, Grim Fandango won "PC Adventure Game of the Year" and was nominated for "Game of the Year", "Computer Entertainment Title of the Year", "Outstanding Achievement in Art/Graphics", "Outstanding Achievement in Character or Story Development", and "Outstanding Achievement in Sound and Music". That year, Next Generation listed Grim Fandango as the 26th-best game of all time, writing: "Grim offered adventure fans funny, touching, and infuriating moments in following its characters, and it did so through a magnificently beautiful game."

In 2003, GameSpot named Grim Fandango one of the greatest games, writing that any of its players would agree, and GameSpy described it as the seventh-most underrated game. GameSpy added it to their "Hall of Fame" in 2004. Adventure Gamers named it the seventh-greatest adventure game in 2004 and the all-time best adventure in 2011. IGN named Grim Fandago the 25th-greatest PC game in 2007 and the 20th-best in 2009. In 2007, IGN named it the 26th-greatest game, writing that it "may very well be the most original and brilliant" adventure game.

==== Lists of awards and rankings ====
Awards and nominations
Publication or ceremony	Award name	Result	Year	Ref.
PC Gamer	Adventure Game of the Year	Won	1998	
IGN	Best Adventure Game of the Year	Won	1998	
CNET Gamecenter	Best Adventure Game of 1998	Won	1998	
GameSpot	PC Adventure Game of the Year	Won	1998	
GameSpot	PC Game of the Year	Won	1998	
GameSpot	Best PC Graphics for Artistic Design	Won	1998	
GameSpot	Best PC Music awards	Won	1998	
GameSpot	Game of the Year	Won	1998	
GameSpot	Best of E3 1998	Won	1998	
Computer Gaming World	Best Adventure Game of the Year	Won, tied with Sanitarium	1998	
Micromanía	Best game in the Adventure and RPG categories	Won	1998	
Game Critics Awards	Best Action/Adventure Game (displayed at E3)	Won	1998	
Academy of Interactive Arts & Sciences	PC Adventure Game of the Year	Won	1999	
Academy of Interactive Arts & Sciences	Game of the Year	Nominated	1999	
Academy of Interactive Arts & Sciences	Computer Entertainment Title of the Year	Nominated	1999	
Academy of Interactive Arts & Sciences	Outstanding Achievement in Art/Graphics	Nominated	1999	
Academy of Interactive Arts & Sciences	Outstanding Achievement in Character or Story Development	Nominated	1999	
Academy of Interactive Arts & Sciences	Outstanding Achievement in Sound and Music	Nominated	1999	

Rankings
Publication	Ranking name	Position	Year	Ref.
GameSpot	Ten Best PC Game Soundtracks	Included in top ten	1999	
Adventure Classic Gaming	Top 10 adventure games of all time	9th position	2000	
Computer Gaming World	CGW's Hall of Fame	Inducted	2001	
GameSpot	Greatest Games of All Time	Included in the list	2003	
GameSpy	25 Most Underrated Games of All Time	7th position	2004	
Adventure Gamers	Top Adventure Game of All Time	7th position	2004	
GameSpy	GameSpy Hall of Fame	Inducted	2004	
IGN	Top 100 Games of All Time	36th position	2007	
IGN	Top 25 PC Games of All Time	15th position	2007	
IGN	Top 25 PC Games	20th position	2009	
Adventure Gamers	Top 100 All-Time Adventures	1st position	2011	
PC Gamer	The 100 best PC games of all time	80th position	2011	
Time	All-Time 100 Greatest Video Games	Included in list	2012	
GameSpot	Best PC Ending (of all time)	10th position	2012	
Wired	The Most Jaw-Dropping Game Graphics of the Last 20 Years	Best of 1998	2013	
Empire	The 100 Greatest Video Games of All Time	84th position	2014	
PC Gamer	The PC Gamer Top 100	21st position	2014	

=== Sales and aftermath ===
Initial estimates suggested that Grim Fandango sold well during the 1998 holiday season. It debuted at #6 for the first week of November on PC Data's computer game sales charts, at an average retail price of $35. It was absent by its second week. In the United Kingdom, Grim Fandango claimed first place on Chart-Track's weekly sales chart in December, before falling to ninth place. It secured 12th after four weeks, and 24th at the 13-week mark. The game sold 58,617 copies and earned $2.33 million in the United States by the end of 1998, and rose to 95,000 sales there by March 2000, according to PC Data. Grim Fandango sold another 16,157 units in the region during 2001, and 8,032 in the first six months of 2002; its jewel case SKU reached 5,621 sales during 2003. According to Tim Schafer, the game achieved sales of approximately 500,000 units by 2012, around 50% fewer than Full Throttle had achieved. It is commonly considered a commercial failure, even though LucasArts stated that "Grim Fandango met domestic expectations and exceeded them worldwide". The game had become profitable by 2000, although Dave Grossman has said, "It was pretty ambitious and expensive, and I don't think it made very much money back." A writer for Edge summarized in 2009, "While its reputation as a flop isn't entirely accurate, Grim's sales were either an indication that people preferred motorbikes to Gitanes-smoking corpses, or a sign of the times: adventure games were simply on their way out."

While LucasArts proceeded to produce Escape from Monkey Island in 2000, they canceled development of sequels to Sam & Max Hit the Road and Full Throttle stating that "After careful evaluation of current market place realities and underlying economic considerations, we've decided that this was not the appropriate time to launch a graphic adventure on the PC." Subsequently, the studio dismissed many of the people involved with their adventure games, some of whom went on to set up Telltale Games, creating an episodic series of Sam & Max games. These events, along with other changes in the video game market towards action-based games, are seen as primary causes in the decline of the adventure game genre. Grim Fandango's underperformance was seen as a sign that the genre was commercially "dead" to rival Sierra, as well. LucasArts stated in 2006 that they do not plan on returning to adventure games until the "next decade". Ultimately the studio stopped developing video games in 2013 after The Walt Disney Company acquisition of Lucasfilm, and was dissolved shortly thereafter.

Tim Schafer left LucasArts shortly after Grim Fandango's release, and created his own company, Double Fine Productions, in 2000 along with many of those involved in the development of Grim Fandango. Double Fine found similar critical success with their first game, Psychonauts. Schafer stated that while there is strong interest from fans and that he "would love to go back and spend time with the characters from any game [he's] worked on", a sequel to Grim Fandango or his other previous games is unlikely as "I always want to make something new." With the help of developers such as Double Fine and Telltale Games, adventure games saw a resurgence in the 2010s, with successful games such as Broken Age, The Walking Dead, and The Wolf Among Us.

=== Remastered version ===
Grim Fandango Remastered (2015)

Aggregate score
Aggregator	Score
Metacritic	PC: 84/100; PS4: 80/100; VITA: 84/100 iOS: 78/100; NS: 84/100

Review scores
Publication	Score
Digital Trends	4.5/5
Eurogamer	8/10
GameRevolution	4.5/5
GameSpot	8/10
Hardcore Gamer	4.5/5
IGN	9.3/10
Nintendo Life	9/10
PC Gamer (US)	80%
PCGamesN	7/10
Push Square	9/10
Shacknews	7/10
TouchArcade	iOS: 5/5
USgamer	3/5

Grim Fandango Remastered has received similar positive reception as the original release, with many critics continuing to praise the game's story, characters, and soundtrack. They also found the developer's commentary to be very insightful to the history of the game. Reviewers were disappointed at the lack of an auto-save system, as well as the game not receiving a full high-definition upgrade, leaving the higher-resolution characters somewhat out of place with the original 3D backgrounds. Many reviewers also noted that the puzzles, though a staple of the day when Grim Fandango was first released, remain somewhat obtuse with solutions that are not clear even after the player solves them, and that a hint system, as was added to the Monkey Island remake, would have been very helpful. The game's pacing, also unchanged from the original version, was also found harder to grasp, in both the pacing within the game's four acts, and the time taken to move around and between rooms. In his review for Eurogamer, Richard Cobbett warned players to "be careful of rose-tinted memories", that while the remastered version is faithful to the original, it does show aspects of the original game that have become outdated in video game development. Wired's Laura Hudson considered the remastered version highlighted how the original game was "an artifact of its time, an exceptional piece of interactive art wrapped inextricably around the technology and conventions of its time in a way that reveals both their limitations and the brilliance they were capable of producing".

== Legacy ==
In 2005, The Guardian characterized the game as "the last genuine classic to come from LucasArts, the company that helped define adventure games, Tim Schafer's noir-pastiche follows skull-faced Manny Calavera through a bureaucratic parody of the Land of the Dead. With a look that takes from both Mexican mythology and art deco, Grim Fandango is as unique an artistic statement as mainstream gaming has managed to offer. While loved by devotees, its limited sales prompted LucasArts to back away from original adventures to simply exploit franchises".

Eurogamer's Jeffrey Matulef, in a 2012 retrospective look, believed that Grim Fandango's combination of film noir and the adventure game genre was the first of its kind and a natural fit due to the script-heavy nature of both, and would later help influence games with similar themes like the Ace Attorney series and L.A. Noire.

Grim Fandango has been considered a representative title demonstrating video games as an art form; the game was selected in 2012 as a candidate for public voting for inclusion within the Smithsonian Institution's "The Art of Video Games" exhibit, while the Museum of Modern Art seeks to install the game as an exhibit as part of its permanent collection within the Department of Architecture and Design.

The game was included in the "Game Masters" exhibition, organized in 2012 by the Australian Centre for the Moving Image (ACMI); an event devoted to explore the faces and the history behind computer games. Tim Schafer was featured as the creative force behind Grim Fandango, within the exhibition section called "Game Changers", crediting him along a few other visionary game designers for having "pushed the boundaries of game design and storytelling, introducing new genres, creating our best-loved characters and revolutionising the way we understand and play games".

Grim Fandango has been the centerpiece of a large fan community for the game that has continued to be active more than 10 years after the game's release. Such fan communities include the Grim Fandango Network and the Department of Death, both of which include fan art and fiction in addition to other original content.

In an interview with Kotaku after the announcement of the remaster, Schafer stated that he has long considered the idea of a Grim Fandango sequel to further expand on the setting of the game. He felt the story would be a difficult component, as either they would have to figure a means to bring Manny back from his final reward, or otherwise build the story around a new character. One option he has considered to alleviate the issue is by creating an adventure game using an open-world mechanic similar to the Grand Theft Auto series.
