= Rogue Leaders =

2008 book by Rob Smith

Rogue Leaders: The Story of LucasArts
- Rogue Leaders: The Story of LucasArts cover
- Author: Rob Smith
- Language: English
- Subject: LucasArts
- Publisher: Chronicle Books
- Publication date: November 26, 2008
- Publication place: United States
- Media type: Print
- Pages: 256 pp
- ISBN: 0-8118-6184-8

Rogue Leaders: The Story of LucasArts is a book about the history of the video game developer and publisher LucasArts, by PlayStation: The Official Magazine's Editor-in-Chief Rob Smith, with a foreword by George Lucas.

== Summary ==
In 1982, George Lucas saw potential in the fledgling video game industry and created his own interactive-entertainment company. Rogue Leaders is the first substantive survey of a video game company, a deluxe compilation that traces its history through never-before-published interviews. In addition, more than 300 pieces of concept art, character development sketches, and storyboards have been reproduced to showcase the creative talent behind games such as The Secret of Monkey Island, Grim Fandango, and Star Wars: Knights of the Old Republic, as well as games that were never publicly released. The book aims to tell the history of the first 25 years of LucasArts game development and publishing, from its beginning as Lucasfilm Games, to the 2008 releases such as Lego Indiana Jones: The Original Adventures.

The book is also an art book, as it features concept art and unused art concepts from LucasArts games.
