= List of baseball video games =

The following is a list of baseball sports video games.

== Franchises ==
- All-Star Baseball
- Backyard Baseball
- Baseball Simulator 1.000
- Baseball Stars
- Bases Loaded (Moero!! Pro Yakyū)
- Champion Baseball
- Chōkūkan Night: Pro Yakyū King
- Family Stadium (Extra Bases)
- Kōshien
- Mario Baseball
- MLB
- MLB 2K
- MLB: The Show
- MVP Baseball
- Power Pros (Jikkyō Powerful Pro Yakyū)
- Professional Baseball Spirits (Pro Yakyū Spirits)
- R.B.I. Baseball
- Super Mega Baseball
- Triple Play
- World Stadium (Great Sluggers)

== Games ==
Title	Year released	Release date	Platform	Developer	Publisher	MLB/NPB License	MLBPA/JPBPA License
BBC Vik: The Baseball Demonstrator	1961		IBM 1620	John Burgeson	IBM	No	No
Baseball	1971		PDP-10	Don Daglow	DEC	No	No
Baseball	1972		Odyssey	Magnavox	Magnavox	No	No
Tornado Baseball	1976		Arcade; Astrocade	Midway	Midway	No	No
Baseball	1977		RCA Studio II	RCA	RCA	No	No
Baseball	1977		Commodore PET	Bob Polaro	Commodore	No	No
Videocart-12: Baseball	1977		Channel F	Fairchild	Fairchild	No	No
Baseball!	1978		Odyssey²	Magnavox	Magnavox	No	No
Home Run	1978		Atari 2600	Atari, Inc.	Atari, Inc.	No	No
Atari Baseball	1979		Arcade	Atari, Inc.	Atari, Inc.	No	No
Ball Park	1979		Arcade	Taito	Taito	No	No
Major League Baseball	1980		Intellivision	APh Technological Consulting	Mattel	Yes	No
Baseball	1980		Microvision	Mattel	Mattel	No	No
Computer Baseball	1981		Apple II; Commodore 64	SSI	SSI	No	No
Star League Baseball	1983		Atari 8-bit; Commodore 64	Gamestar	Activision	No	No
MicroLeague Baseball	1983		Commodore 64; Atari 8-bit	MicroLeague	Commodore International	No	No
Super Challenge Baseball	1982		Atari 2600	Mattel	Atari	No	No
Baseball	1983		NES	Nintendo	Nintendo	No	No
Champion Baseball	1983		Arcade	Alpha Denshi	Sega	No	No
Intellivision World Series Baseball	1983		Intellivision	Don Daglow & Eddie Dombrower	Mattel	Yes	No
RealSports Baseball	1982		Atari 2600; Atari 5200; Atari 7800	Atari	Atari	No	No
Super Action Baseball	1983		ColecoVision	Coleco	Coleco	No	No
Pro Manager	1984		DOS	The Avalon Hill Game Company			
The World's Greatest Baseball Game	1984		Apple II	Quest, Inc.	Epyx	No	No
World Championship Baseball	1985		Intellivision	APh Technological Consulting	INTV Corp	No	No
HardBall!	1985	1991	Commodore 64; Atari 8-bit; Sega Genesis	Accolade	Accolade	No	No
World Series - The Season	1985		Arcade	Cinematronics	Cinematronics	No	No
Pro Baseball: Family Stadium (Pro Yakyu Family Stadium)	1986	1986/12/10	Family Computer	Namco	Namco	No	No
Atari R.B.I Baseball	1987	1987/09	Arcade	Namco / Atari Games	Atari Games	No	Yes
Earl Weaver Baseball	1987		Amiga; MS-DOS	Don Daglow & Eddie Dombrower	Electronic Arts	No	No
Great Baseball	1987		Master System	Sega	Sega	No	No
R.B.I. Baseball	1988		NES	Namco / Atari Games	Tengen	No	Yes
Super Baseball	1988		NES	Atari	Atari	No	No
Reggie Jackson Baseball/American Baseball	1988		Master System	Sega	Sega	No	No
Major League Baseball	1988	1988/04	NES	Enteractive	LJN	Yes	No
Bases Loaded	1988	1988/07	NES	TOSE	Jaleco Entertainment	No	No
Major League	1989		NES	Lenar	Irem		
Pete Rose Baseball	1989		Atari 2600; Atari 7800	Absolute	Absolute	No	No
Tommy Lasorda Baseball	1989		Genesis	Sega	Sega	No	No
Baseball Simulator 1.000	1989		NES	Culture Brain	Culture Brain	No	No
Tecmo Baseball	1989	1989/01	NES	Tecmo	Tecmo	No	No
Baseball Stars	1989	1989/07	NES	SNK	Nintendo	No	No
Dusty Diamond's All-Star Softball	1990		NES	TOSE	Broderbund	No	No
R.B.I. Baseball 2	1990		NES	Atari Games	Tengen	No	Yes
Bases Loaded II: Second Season	1990	1990/02	NES	TOSE	Jaleco Entertainment	No	No
Bad News Baseball	1990	1990/06	NES	Tecmo	Tecmo	No	No
Little League Baseball: Championship Series	1990	1990/06	NES	SNK	SNK	No	No
R.B.I. Baseball 3	1991		NES; Genesis	Atari Games	Tengen	No	Yes
Bo Jackson Baseball	1991		MS-DOS; NES	Data East	Data East	No	No
Extra Innings	1991		SNES	Sting	Sony Imagesoft	No	No
Hardball II	1991		MS-DOS	Distinctive Interactive	Accolade	No	No
Base Wars	1991	1991/06	NES	Ultra Games	Konami	No	No
Roger Clemens' MVP Baseball	1991		NES	LJN	LJN	No	No
Super Baseball Simulator 1.000	1991	1991/12	SNES	Culture Brain	Culture Brain	No	No
Super Bases Loaded	1991		SNES	TOSE	Jaleco	No	No
Baseball Stars Professional	1991	1991/07/01	Neo-Geo	SNK	SNK	No	No
Bases Loaded III	1991	1991/09	NES	TOSE	Jaleco Entertainment	No	No
R.B.I. Baseball 4	1992		Genesis	Tengen	Tengen	No	Yes
Cal Ripken Jr. Baseball	1992		SNES; Genesis	Mindscape	Mindscape	No	No
Nolan Ryan's Baseball	1992		SNES	Affect	Romstar	No	No
Roger Clemens' MVP Baseball	1992		SNES	Sculptured Software	LJN	No	No
Baseball Stars 2	1992		NES; Neo-Geo	Eikichi Kawasaki and team	Romstar	No	No
Sports Talk Baseball	1992		Genesis	Sega	Sega	No	Yes
Super Batter Up	1992	1992/10	SNES	Namco	Namco	No	Yes
Tony La Russa Baseball	1992		Genesis	Stormfront Studios	Electronic Arts	No	Yes
Super Baseball 2020	1993	1993; 1994/03/03; 1995/02/25	SNES; Genesis; Neo-Geo	Tradewest|NuFX|SNK	SNK|Electronic Arts|SNK	No	No
Tony La Russa Baseball II	1993	1993	MS-DOS	Stormfront Studios	SSI	No	No
Bases Loaded 4	1993	1993/04	NES	TOSE	Jaleco Entertainment	No	No
R.B.I. Baseball '93	1993	1993	Genesis	Tengen	Tengen	No	Yes
Roger Clemens' MVP Baseball	1993	1993/08/27	Game Boy	Sculptured Software	Acclaim Japan	No	No
Ken Griffey Jr. Presents Major League Baseball	1994	1994	SNES	Software Creations	Nintendo	Yes	No
MLBPA Baseball	1994	1994	SNES; Genesis	Visual Concepts	EA Sports	No	Yes
R.B.I. Baseball '94	1994	1994	Genesis	Tengen	Tengen	No	Yes
Sports Illustrated: Championship Football & Baseball	1994	1994	SNES	Malibu Games	Mailbu Games	No	No
Relief Pitcher	1994	1994/05	SNES	Left Field Productions	Tengen	No	No
World Series Baseball	1994	1994 (spring)	Genesis	BlueSky Software	Sega	Yes	Yes
ESPN Baseball Tonight	1994	1995	SNES; Genesis	Park Place	Sony Imagesoft	Yes	No
Hardball III	1994	1994/06	SNES; Genesis	Mindspan	Accolade	No	Yes
Super Bases Loaded 2	1994	1994	SNES	TOSE	Jaleco	No	No
Super Bases Loaded 3: License to Steal/Super Moero!! Pro Yakyuu	1994	1994	SNES	TOSE	Jaleco	Yes (NPB)	Yes (MLBPA/JPBPA)
Tecmo Super Baseball	1994	1994	SNES	Tecmo	Tecmo	No	Yes (MLBPA)
Jikkyō Powerful Pro Yakyū '94	1994	1994	SFC	Konami	Konami	Yes (NPB)	Yes (JPBPA)
World Series Baseball '95	1995	1995	Genesis	Blue Sky Software	Sega	Yes	Yes
Triple Play 96	1995	1995/03/18	Genesis	Extended Play	Electronic Arts		
Super R.B.I. Baseball	1995	1995/07	SNES	Gray Matter	Time Warner Interactive	No	Yes
Super Power League 2/The Sporting News Baseball	1995	1995	SNES		Hudson Soft	Yes (NPB)	Yes (MLBPA/JPBPA)
Frank Thomas' Big Hurt Baseball	1995	1996/05/31; 1996/06/05; 1995	MS-DOS; PlayStation; SNES; Game Boy; Genesis; Saturn	Iguana Entertainment; Iguana Entertainment UK; Realtime Associates (Game Boy)	Acclaim Entertainment	No	Yes
Virtual League Baseball	1995	1995	Virtual Boy	Kemco	Kemco	No	No
Front Page Sports: Baseball Pro '96 Season	1996	1996/06/31	Microsoft Windows	Dynamix	Sierra On-Line		
World Series Baseball 2	1996	1996	Genesis	Blue Sky Software	Sega	Yes	Yes
Ken Griffey Jr.'s Winning Run	1996	1996	SNES	Rare	Nintendo	Yes	No
Triple Play 97	1996	1996/06/30	MS-DOS; PlayStation	EA Sports	Electronic Arts	Yes	Yes
World Series Baseball '96	1996	1996	Genesis	Blue Sky Software	Sega	Yes	Yes
MLB Pennant Race	1996	1996/09/30	PlayStation	Sony Interactive	SCEA	Yes	No
3D Baseball	1996	1996/11/30	PlayStation; Saturn	Crystal Dynamics	Crystal Dynamics		
All-Star Baseball	1997	1997	Saturn	Iguana Entertainment	Acclaim Entertainment		
Ken Griffey Jr. Presents Major League Baseball	1997	1997	Game Boy	Software Creations	Nintendo		
World Series Baseball '98	1997	1997	Saturn; Genesis	Blue Sky Software	Sega	Yes	Yes
3D Baseball: The Majors	1997	1997/01/31	PlayStation; Saturn	Crystal Dynamics	BMG Interactive		
VR Baseball '97	1997	1997/03/31	PlayStation	VR Sports	Interplay Productions		
Grand Slam 97	1997	1997/04/30	PlayStation	Burst Studios	Virgin Interactive		
Triple Play 98	1997	1997/06/04	Microsoft Windows; PlayStation	EA Sports	Electronic Arts	Yes	Yes
Aaron vs. Ruth	1997	1997/06/30	Microsoft Windows	Mindscape	Mindscape		
Baseball Mogul	1997	1997/06/30	Microsoft Windows	Infinite Monkey	Infinite Monkey		
MLB '98	1997	1997/06/30	PlayStation	SCEA	SCEA	Yes	Yes
Tony La Russa Baseball 4	1997	1997/06/30	Microsoft Windows	Stormfront Studios	Maxis		
DSF Baseball 98	1997	1997/11/01	Microsoft Windows	Sierra On-Line	Sierra On-Line		
Triple Play 99	1998	1998/02/28	PC; PlayStation	EA Sports	Electronic Arts	Yes	Yes
Hardball 6	1998	1998/03/31	PC	MindSpan	Accolade		
High Heat Major League Baseball 1999	1998	1998/03/31	PC	Team .366	3DO	Yes	Yes
MLB '99	1998	1998/03/31	PlayStation	Sony Interactive	SCEA	Yes	Yes
Microsoft Baseball 3D 1998 Edition	1998	1998/07/01	PC	WizBang! Software	Microsoft		
VR Baseball '99	1998	1998/05/31	PlayStation	VR Sports	Interplay		
Mike Piazza's Strike Zone	1998	1998/06/16	Nintendo 64	Devil's Thumb Entertainment	GT Interactive		
Bottom of the 9th '99	1998	1998/08/31	PlayStation	Konami	Konami		
VR Baseball 2000	1998	1998/09/30	Microsoft Windows	Interplay	VR Sports		
All-Star Baseball '99	1998	1998	Nintendo 64; Game Boy	Iguana Entertainment|Realtime Associates	Acclaim Sports		
Major League Baseball Featuring Ken Griffey Jr.	1998	1998	Nintendo 64	Angel Studios|	Nintendo	Yes	
Hardball 99	1998	1998/10/31	PlayStation	MindSpan	Accolade		
MLB 2000	1999	1999/02/28	PlayStation	989 Sports	SCEA	Yes	Yes
Hardball 6 2000 Edition	1999	1999/03/29	PC	MindSpan	Accolade		
High Heat Major League Baseball 2000	1999	1999/03/31	PC; PlayStation	Team .366	3DO	Yes	Yes
Microsoft Baseball 2000	1999	1999/04	PC	WizBang! Software	Microsoft		
Triple Play 2000	1999	1999/03/31	PC; PlayStation; Nintendo 64	EA Sports	Electronic Arts	Yes	Yes
Baseball Edition 2000	1999	1999/04/30	PC	Interplay	Interplay		
Ken Griffey Jr.'s Slugfest	1999	1991/06	Nintendo 64; Game Boy Color	Rockstar San Diego; Software Creations	Nintendo		
All-Star Baseball 2000	1999	1999	Nintendo 64; Game Boy Color	Iguana Entertainment; Realtime Associates	Acclaim Sports		
Out of the Park Baseball	1999	1999	PC; Mac	OOTP Developments	OOTP Developments		
High Heat Major League Baseball 2001	2000	2000/03/08	Microsoft Windows; PlayStation	3DO	3DO	Yes	Yes
Backyard Baseball 2001	2000	2000/06/06	Microsoft Windows	Humongous Entertainment	Infogrames		
All-Star Baseball 2001	2000	2000/04/30	Nintendo 64; Game Boy Color	High Voltage Software; KnowWonder	Acclaim Sports		
MLB 2001	2000	2000/02/29	PlayStation	989 Sports	SCEA	Yes	Yes
World Series Baseball 2K1	2001	2001	Dreamcast	Blue Sky Software	Sega	Yes	Yes
Sammy Sosa High-Heat Baseball 2001	2000	2000/03/07	PC; PlayStation	Team .366	3DO		
Triple Play 2001	2000	2000/03/31; 2000/02/29; 2000/04/30	PC; PlayStation; Game Boy Color	EA Sports	Electronic Arts; Electronic Arts; THQ	Yes	Yes
Microsoft Baseball 2001	2000	2000/03	PC	Microsoft	Microsoft		
Gekikuukan Pro Baseball: At the End of the Century 1999	2000	2000/09/7	PlayStation 2	SquareSoft	SquareSoft; Nippon Television Network Corporation	Yes (NPB)	Yes (JPBPA)
Triple Play Baseball	2001	2001/03/04; 2001/03/12; 2001/03/12	PC; PlayStation 2; PlayStation	EA Sports	Electronic Arts	Yes	Yes
All-Star Baseball 2002	2001	2001	PlayStation 2; GameCube	Acclaim Studios Austin	Acclaim Sports		
High Heat Major League Baseball 2002	2001	2001/03/26; 2001/03/26; 2001/03/14; 2001/09/16	PC; PlayStation 2; PlayStation; Game Boy Advance	3DO; Möbius Entertainment (GBA)	3DO	Yes	Yes
Baseball Mogul 2002	2001	2001/03/31	PC	Sports Mogul	Sports Mogul		
Out of the Park Baseball II	2001	2001/03/31	PC	Out of the Park	Out of the Park		
MLB 2002	2001	2001/05/07	PlayStation	989 Sports	SCEA	Yes	Yes
Season Ticket Baseball	2001	2001/06/19	PC	Out of the Park	WizardWorks		
All-Star Baseball 2003	2002	2002	Xbox; PlayStation 2; GameCube; Game Boy Advance	Acclaim Studios Austin; The Creations Group Ltd.	Acclaim Sports		
High Heat Major League Baseball 2003	2002	2002/02/12	PC; PlayStation; PlayStation 2; Game Boy Advance	3DO; Möbius Entertainment (GBA)	3DO	Yes	Yes
Out of the Park Baseball 4	2002	2002/02/28	PC	Out of the Park	Out of the Park		
Triple Play 2002	2002	2002/03/11	PlayStation 2; Xbox	Pandemic Studios	Electronic Arts		
Home Run King	2002	2002/03/18	GameCube	Wow Entertainment	Sega		
Season Ticket Baseball 2003	2002	2002/03/24	PC	Out of the Park	Infogrames		
Nichibeikan Pro Baseball: Final League	2002	2002/04/25	PlayStation 2	SquareSoft	SquareSoft; Major League Baseball Advanced Media	Yes (MLB)	Yes (MLBPA/JPBPA)
Baseball Mogul 2003	2002	2002/04/30	PC	Sports Mogul	Monkeystone		
Little League Baseball	2002	2002/05/27	GBA	NewKidCo	NewKidCo		
Backyard Baseball 2003	2002	2002/06/07	PC	Humongous Entertainment	Infogrames		
MLB 2003	2002	2002/06/17	PlayStation	989 Sports	SCEA	Yes	Yes
MLB Slugfest 20-03	2002	2002/06/23; 2002/08/26; 2003/09/03	PlayStation 2; Xbox; GameCube	Gratuitous Games	Midway	Yes	Yes
PureSim Baseball	2002	2002/07/05	PC	PureSim	PureSim		
Baseball Addict	2002	2002/09/27	PC; Pocket PC	Hexacto	Hexacto		
High Heat Major League Baseball 2004	2003	2003/02/20	PC; PlayStation 2; Xbox; GBA	3DO; Möbius Entertainment (GBA)	3DO	Yes	Yes
All-Star Baseball 2004	2003	2003	Xbox; PlayStation 2; GameCube; Game Boy Advance	Acclaim Studios Austin; Acclaim Studios Manchester	Acclaim Sports		
Out of the Park Baseball 5	2003	2003/02/28	PC	Out of the Park	Out of the Park		
Baseball Mogul 2004	2003	2003/03/06	PC	Hip Games	Hip Games		
World Series Baseball 2K3	2003	2003/03/10	PlayStation 2; Xbox	Visual Concepts; Blue Shift Inc.	Sega		
MLB Slugfest 20-04	2003	2003/03/16	PlayStation 2; Xbox; GameCube; Game Boy Advance	Midway	Midway	Yes	Yes
MVP Baseball 2003	2003	2003/03/24	PC; PlayStation 2; Xbox	EA Sports	Electronic Arts	Yes	Yes
MLB 2004	2003	2003/04/30	PlayStation; PlayStation 2	989 Sports	SCEA	Yes	Yes
Inside Pitch 2003	2003	2003/05/20	Xbox	Microsoft	Microsoft	Yes	Yes
Big League Slugger Baseball	2003	2003/07/15	PlayStation	Now Production	Agetec		
Gekitou Pro Yakyuu: Mizushima Shinji Allstars vs Pro Yakyuu	2003	2003/09/11	Arcade; GameCube; PlayStation 2	WOW Entertainment	Sega	Yes	
MLB Slam!	2003	2003/10/31	N-Gage	THQ	Nokia		
Inside the Park Baseball	2003	2003/12/19	PC	Out of the Park	Out of the Park		
All-Star Baseball 2005	2004	2004	Xbox; PlayStation 2	Acclaim Studios Austin	Acclaim Entertainment		
PureSim Baseball 2004	2004	2004	PC	Shaun Sullivan	Shaun Sullivan		
MLB 2005	2004	2004/03/04	PlayStation; PlayStation 2	989 Sports	SCEA	Yes	Yes
ESPN Major League Baseball	2004	2004/05/04; 2004/04/06	PlayStation 2; Xbox	Visual Concepts	Sega	Yes	Yes
Baseball Mogul 2005	2004	2004/05	PC	Sports Mogul	Sports Mogul		
MVP Baseball 2004	2004	2004/03/09	PC; PlayStation 2; Xbox; GameCube	EA Sports	Electronic Arts	Yes	Yes
MLB Slugfest Loaded	2004	2004/03/09	PlayStation 2; Xbox	Midway	Midway	Yes	Yes
ESPN Ultimate Baseball Online	2005	2005	PC	Netamin	Netamin		
QMotions Baseball	2005	2005	PC	QMotion	QMotion		
MVP Baseball 2005	2005	2005/02/22	PC; PlayStation 2; Xbox; GameCube	EA Sports	Electronic Arts	Yes	Yes
Major League Baseball 2K5	2005	2005/02/28; 2005/02/23	PlayStation 2; Xbox	Visual Concepts	2K Sports	Yes	Yes
MLB 2006	2005	2005/03/08	PlayStation 2	989 Sports	SCEA	Yes	Yes
Baseball Mogul 2006	2005	2005/03/15	PC	Sports Mogul	Sports Mogul		
MLB	2005	2005/04/12	PSP	989 Sports	SCEA		
Out of the Park Baseball 6.5	2005	2005/06/14	PC	Out of the Park	Out of the Park		
Mario Superstar Baseball	2005	2005/08/29	GameCube	Namco	Nintendo		
MVP 06: NCAA Baseball	2006	2006/01/18	PlayStation 2; Xbox	EA Sports	Electronic Arts	No	No
MLB '06: The Show	2006	2006/02/28	PlayStation 2; PSP	SCEA	SCEA	Yes	Yes
Major League Baseball 2K6	2006	2006/04/03; 2006/04/13; 2006/04/10; 2006/04/03; 2006/06/12	PlayStation 2; PSP; Xbox 360; Xbox; GameCube	Visual Concepts	2K Sports	Yes	Yes
Baseball Mogul 2007	2006	2006/04/12	PC	Sports Mogul	Enlight Software		
Ultimate Baseball Online 2006	2006	2006/04/12	PC	Netamin	Netamin		
PureSim Baseball 2007	2006	2006/05/15	PC	Shaun Sullivan	Matrix Games		
Out of the Park Baseball Manager 2006	2006	2006/05/31	Microsoft Windows; Mac	Sports Interactive	Out of the Park		
MLB Slugfest 2006	2006	2006/06/05	PlayStation 2; Xbox	Blue Shift	Midway	Yes	Yes
Backyard Baseball 2007	2006	2006/08/08; 2006/08/15; 2006/08/29; 2006/06/12	PC; PlayStation 2; GameCube; GBA	Game Brains	Atari		
Wii Sports	2006	2006/11/19; 2006/12/02; 2006/12/07; 2006/12/08	Wii	Nintendo EAD	Nintendo	No	No
Winnie the Pooh's Home Run Derby	2007		Browser	Walt Disney Japan	Walt Disney Japan; Yahoo! Kids	No	No
Franchise Ball	2013		Browser	Franchise Ball	Franchise Ball	No	No
MVP 07: NCAA Baseball	2007	2007/02/06	PlayStation 2	EA Sports	Electronic Arts	No	No
The BIGS	2007	2007/06/25	PlayStation 3; PlayStation 2; PSP; Xbox 360; Wii	Blue Castle Games	2K Sports	Yes	Yes
Slugger!	Canceled	Canceled	PlayStation 2; Xbox	Farsight Technologies	Mad Catz		
MLB 07: The Show	2007	2007/02/26	PlayStation 3; PlayStation 2; PSP	SCEA	SCEA	Yes	Yes
Major League Baseball 2K7	2007	2007/02/26	PlayStation 3; PlayStation 2; PSP	Visual Concepts	2K Sports	Yes	Yes
MLB 08: The Show	2008	2008/03/04	PlayStation 3; PlayStation 2; PSP	SCEA	SCEA	Yes	Yes
Baseball Mogul 2008	2007	2007/03/20	Microsoft Windows	Sports Mogul	Sports Mogul		
MLB Power Pros	2007	2007/10/01; 2007/10/04	PlayStation 2; Wii	Konami	2K Sports		
Major League Baseball 2K8	2008	2008/03/04	PlayStation 3; PlayStation 2; Xbox 360; Wii; Nintendo DS	Visual Concepts	2K Sports	Yes	Yes
Major League Baseball 2K8 Fantasy All-Stars	2008	2008/04/15	Nintendo DS	Deep Fried Entertainment	2K Sports	Yes	Yes
MLB Power Pros 2008	2008	2008/07/29; 2008/08/25; 2008/10/03	PlayStation 2; Wii; Nintendo DS	Konami	2K Sports		
Baseball Mogul 2009	2008	2008/08/15	Microsoft Windows	Sports Mogul	Sports Mogul		
Mario Super Sluggers	2008	2008/08/25	Wii	Namco Bandai Games	Nintendo	No	No
MLB Dugout Heroes	2009	2009/03/03	PC	WiseCat	GamesCampus		
Major League Baseball 2K9	2009	2009/03/03	Microsoft Windows; PlayStation 2; PlayStation 3; PSP; Xbox 360; Wii	Visual Concepts; Kush Games	2K Sports	Yes	Yes
MLB 09: The Show	2009	2009/03/03	PlayStation 3	San Diego Studio	SCEA	Yes	Yes
Baseball Mogul 2010	2009	2009/03/25	Microsoft Windows	Sports Mogul	Sports Mogul		
MLB World Series 2009	2009	2009/04/10	iOS	Polarbit	MLB Advanced Media	Yes	Yes
Major League Baseball 2K10	2010	2010/03/09	Windows; PlayStation 2; PlayStation 3; PSP; Xbox 360; Wii	Visual Concepts	2K Sports	Yes	Yes
MLB 10: The Show	2010	2010/03/09	PlayStation 3	San Diego Studio	SCEA	Yes	Yes
Baseball Mogul 2011	2010	2010/03/26	Microsoft Windows	Sports Mogul	Sports Mogul		
MLB 11: The Show	2011	2011/03/07	PlayStation 3	San Diego Studio	SCEA	Yes	Yes
Major League Baseball 2K11	2011	2011/03/07	PlayStation 3; PlayStation 2; Xbox 360; Wii	Visual Concepts	2K Sports	Yes	Yes
MLB 12: The Show	2012	2012/03/06	PlayStation 3; PlayStation Vita	San Diego Studio	SCEA	Yes	Yes
Major League Baseball 2K12	2012	2012/03/06	Microsoft Windows; PlayStation 3; Wii; Xbox 360; PlayStation 2	Visual Concepts	2K Sports	Yes	Yes
Strategy Baseball	2013	2026	PC	Steven Lucey		No	No
MLB 13: The Show	2013	2013/03/05	PlayStation 3; PlayStation Vita	San Diego Studio	SCEA	Yes	Yes
Major League Baseball 2K13	2013	2013/03/05	PlayStation 3; Xbox 360	Visual Concepts	2K Sports	Yes	Yes
MLB 14: The Show	2014	2014/05/06 (PS4)	PlayStation 3; PlayStation Vita; PlayStation 4	San Diego Studio	SCEA	Yes	Yes
R.B.I. Baseball 14	2014	2014/04/08	Android; iPhone; PlayStation 3; PlayStation 4; Xbox 360; Xbox One	MLB Advanced Media	MLB Advanced Media	Yes	Yes
Baseball Mogul 2015	2014	2014/04/11	Microsoft Windows	Sports Mogul	Sports Mogul		
Super Mega Baseball	2014	2014/12/16	PlayStation 3; PlayStation 4; Xbox One; Steam	Metalhead Software	Metalhead Software	No	No
Tamagotchi Baseball	2015	2015/03/01	Wii U; Nintendo 3DS	Namco Bandai Games	Bandai		
Out of the Park Baseball 16	2015	2015/03/23	Microsoft Windows; Mac; Linux	Out of the Park Developments	Out of the Park Developments	Yes	Yes
MLB 15: The Show	2015	2015/03/31	PlayStation 3; PlayStation Vita; PlayStation 4	San Diego Studio	SCEA	Yes	Yes
R.B.I. Baseball 15	2015	2015/03/31	iPhone; Steam; PlayStation 4; Xbox One	MLB Advanced Media	MLB Advanced Media	Yes	Yes
Out of the Park Baseball 17	2016	2016/03/22	Microsoft Windows; Mac; Linux	Out of the Park Developments	Out of the Park Developments	Yes	Yes
Baseball Mogul 2016	2016	2016/03/21	Microsoft Windows	Sports Mogul	Sports Mogul		
R.B.I. Baseball 16	2016	2016/03/29	Steam; PlayStation 4; Xbox One	MLB Advanced Media	MLB Advanced Media	Yes	Yes
MLB 16: The Show	2016	2016/03/29	PlayStation 3; PlayStation 4	San Diego Studio	SCEA	Yes	Yes
Mario Sports Superstars	2017	2017/03/10	Nintendo 3DS	Camelot Software Planning; Bandai Namco Games	Nintendo	No	No
Out of the Park Baseball 18	2017	2017/03/24	Microsoft Windows; Mac; Linux	Out of the Park Developments	Out of the Park Developments	Yes	Yes
R.B.I. Baseball 17	2017	2017/03/28	Steam; PlayStation 4; Xbox One; Nintendo Switch	MLB Advanced Media	MLB Advanced Media	Yes	Yes
MLB The Show 17	2017	2017/03/28	PlayStation 4	San Diego Studio	SCEA	Yes	Yes
R.B.I. Baseball 18	2018	2018/03/20	PlayStation 4; Xbox One; Nintendo Switch	MLB Advanced Media	MLB Advanced Media	Yes	Yes
MLB The Show 18	2018	2018/03/27	PlayStation 4	San Diego Studio	SCEA	Yes	Yes
Super Mega Baseball 2	2018	2018/05/01	Microsoft Windows PlayStation 4 Xbox One Nintendo Switch	Metalhead Software	Metalhead Software	No	No
R.B.I. Baseball 19	2019	2019/03/05	PlayStation 4; Xbox One; Nintendo Switch; Android; iOS	MLB Advanced Media	MLB Advanced Media	Yes	Yes
MLB The Show 19	2019	2019/03/26	PlayStation 4	San Diego Studio	SCEA	Yes	Yes
MLB The Show 20	2020	2020/01/14	PlayStation 4	San Diego Studio	SCEA	Yes	Yes
Super Mega Baseball 3	2020	2020/05/13	Microsoft Windows Nintendo Switch PlayStation 4 Xbox One Amazon Luna	Metalhead Software	Metalhead Software	No	No
Blaseball	2020	2020/07/20	Web	The Game Band	The Game Band	Yes	Yes
MLB The Show 21	2021	2021/04/20	PlayStation 4; PlayStation 5; Xbox One; Xbox Series X/S	San Diego Studio	SCEA	Yes	Yes
MLB The Show 22	2022	2022/04/05	PlayStation 4; PlayStation 5; Xbox One; Xbox Series X/S; Nintendo Switch	San Diego Studio	SCEA	Yes	Yes
MLB The Show 23	2023	2023/03/28	PlayStation 4; PlayStation 5; Xbox One; Xbox Series X/S; Nintendo Switch	San Diego Studio	SCEA	Yes	Yes
Super Mega Baseball 4	2023	2023/05/30	Steam; PlayStation 4; PlayStation 5; Xbox One; Xbox Series X/S; Nintendo Switch	Metalhead Software	EA Sports	No	No
MLB The Show 24	2024	2024/03/15	PlayStation 4; PlayStation 5; Xbox One; Xbox Series X/S; Nintendo Switch	San Diego Studio	SCEA	Yes	Yes
MLB The Show 25	2025	2025/03/18	Nintendo Switch PlayStation 5 Xbox Series X/S	San Diego Studio	SCEA		
MLB The Show 26	2026	2026/03/17	Nintendo Switch PlayStation 5 Xbox Series X/S	San Diego Studio	SCEA		
