= All-Star Baseball =

- North American cover art for PlayStation 2 of All-Star Baseball 2005, the final game in the series
- Genre: Sports
- Developers: Console; Iguana Entertainment/Acclaim Studios Austin (All except 2001); High Voltage Software (2001); Handheld; Realtime Associates ('99, 2000); KnowWonder (2001); Creations/Acclaim Studios Manchester (2003 and 2004)
- Publisher: Acclaim Entertainment/Acclaim Sports
- Composer: Nelson Everhart
- Platforms: PlayStation; Sega Saturn; Nintendo 64; Game Boy Color; PlayStation 2; Xbox; GameCube; Game Boy Advance
- First release: All-Star Baseball '97 Featuring Frank Thomas; June 30, 1997
- Latest release: All-Star Baseball 2005; April 8, 2004

All-Star Baseball is a series of baseball video games that was developed and published by Acclaim Entertainment. The series began in 1997 with the release of All-Star Baseball '97 Featuring Frank Thomas, the successor to Frank Thomas Big Hurt Baseball. New York Yankees play-by-play announcers John Sterling and Michael Kay were the announcers for 1998-2000 editions of the game.

The final game in the series is All-Star Baseball 2005, released in April 2004. The following month, Major League Baseball ended its licensing agreement with Acclaim for the franchise due to unpaid royalties. The franchise went inactive following Acclaim's bankruptcy in September 2004.

== Gameplay ==
Within the individual games, there are several different modes of play, such as exhibition, managing an existing Major League Baseball team or creating a team. Many cities around the world are available for "expansion", in addition to Mexico City and Puerto Rico.

With the exception of All-Star Baseball '97 and All-Star Baseball '99 (which feature Frank Thomas of the Chicago White Sox and Larry Walker of the Colorado Rockies respectively), all of the games feature Derek Jeter of the New York Yankees on the cover.

== Series ==
Title	Year	Platforms
All-Star Baseball '97 Featuring Frank Thomas	1997	PlayStation, Sega Saturn (released exclusively in North America)
All-Star Baseball '99	1998	Nintendo 64, Game Boy (only the Game Boy version released exclusively in North America)
All-Star Baseball 2000	1999	Nintendo 64, Game Boy Color
All-Star Baseball 2001	2000	Nintendo 64, Game Boy Color (released exclusively in North America)
All-Star Baseball 2002	2001	GameCube, PlayStation 2 (only the GameCube version was released exclusively in North America)
All-Star Baseball 2003	2002	Xbox, GameCube, PlayStation 2, Game Boy Advance (only the PS2 and Xbox versions were released in Europe, and only the GameCube, PS2, and Xbox versions were released in Japan)
All-Star Baseball 2004	2003	Xbox, GameCube, PlayStation 2, Game Boy Advance (only the PS2 version was released in Europe)
All-Star Baseball 2005	2004	Xbox, PlayStation 2 (released exclusively in North America)

=== 1997 ===
The first game in the series featured Frank Thomas and was released for the PlayStation and Sega Saturn.

=== 1999 ===
The game also marked the debut of play-by-play commentary. This is done by two New York Yankees broadcasters: John Sterling and Michael Kay. Larry Walker appeared on the game's box.

=== 2005 ===
All-Star Baseball 2005 features a variety of things that most previous versions (except 2004) did not include, such as classic players like Babe Ruth, Yogi Berra and others. Apart from each of the MLB teams, the game also features MLB legends of different eras and the 2004 American and National league teams. One particular game characteristic is that it includes the Montreal Expos, who relocated from Montreal to Washington, D.C., and changed their name to the Washington Nationals for the 2005 MLB season because despite the year 2005 in the name, the game was released in 2004 with 2004 Rosters and Teams.

The game includes all thirty stadiums as of the 2004 season, as well as other fictional and non-fictional ball parks to bring the total to over eighty parks. Some of these parks include: the Polo Grounds used by the then New York Giants (the New York Yankees played their home games there as well from 1913 to 1922); Ebbets Field used by the Brooklyn Dodgers from 1913 to 1957, Houston Astrodome; Hiram Bithorn Stadium used by the Montreal Expos in their final season; retro, current and future versions of Fenway Park, Yankee Stadium, Shea Stadium and Dodger Stadium.

== Reception ==
The Nintendo 64 versions received positive reviews, with an average score in the mid-to-high eighties according to GameRankings. The GameCube version of All-Star Baseball 2002 received the lowest reviews of all the home console games in the series, with an average score of 67%. All-Star Baseball 2000 on the Game Boy Color has the lowest scores of the entire series, at 60%.

The first game in the series, All-Star Baseball '97 Featuring Frank Thomas, received mediocre reviews upon its release for the PlayStation.

== See also ==
- Triple Play
- MVP Baseball
- MLB 2K
- MLB: The Show
