= Mike Piazza's StrikeZone =

1998 video game

- Developer: Devil's Thumb Entertainment
- Publisher: GT Interactive
- Platform: Nintendo 64
- Release: NA: June 18, 1998
- Genre: Sports
- Modes: Single-player, multiplayer

Mike Piazza's StrikeZone is a baseball game licensed by Major League Baseball and was released for the Nintendo 64. It was developed by Devil's Thumb Entertainment and released on June 18, 1998, by GT Interactive. While being endorsed by Mike Piazza, Strike Zone represents all of the MLB players in the 1997–98 season including those in the National League and American League.

== Gameplay ==
The game offers standard baseball game play with all 30 official stadiums, and a choice of leagues to play for, but also offers the player the option to design their own team and league, from the logo, and uniforms all the way up to player abilities and appearance. The player can play a single game or a season of 15, 81, or 162 games, the World Series game, All-Star Game, or compete in a batting challenge known as the Home Run Derby.

The official players in Mike Piazza's StrikeZone have different batting and pitching styles as well as stamina that causes them to perform with less precision after being used continuously. When batting, the ball has a flame-like trail behind it that tells the hitter whether it is in the Strike Zone (red) or in the Ball Zone (blue), allowing the player to better choose which balls to hit. Saving the season, and saving a player-created team, require separate Controller Paks. While playing with a Rumble Pak it cannot be replaced with the Controller Pak, and a separate controller is needed to save.

== Development ==
The game was developed by Devil's Thumb Entertainment, a company founded in November 1996 in Boulder, Colorado. Some of the development team had previously worked on the Super NES game Ken Griffey Jr. Presents Major League Baseball.

== Reception ==
Reception

Aggregate score
Aggregator	Score
GameRankings	36%

Review scores
Publication	Score
AllGame	2.5/5
Electronic Gaming Monthly	2.625/10 (Note: Two critics of Electronic Gaming Monthly gave the game each a score of 2/10, one gave it 3.5/10, and the other gave it 3/10.)
Game Informer	4.25/10
GameFan	57% (Note: In GameFan's viewpoint of the game, one critic gave it 58, and the other 55.)
IGN	3/10
Next Generation	1/5
Nintendo Power	5.4/10

With a long list of customizable features and early test previews, the game received good previews from gaming sites such as IGN. When finally released, however, it received unfavorable reviews according to the review aggregation website GameRankings. It was criticized for its graphics, few voice clips, continuous sound elements repeating themselves over and over, simple challenges and unrealistic home run hitting. It was compared to contemporary games such as All-Star Baseball '99 and Major League Baseball Featuring Ken Griffey Jr., both released for N64 that same year. Next Generation said, "There are really only two baseball choices for Nintendo 64 this year – and Strike Zone isn't one of them."

Electronic Gaming Monthly's Kraig Kujawa described the presentation as "so amateurish that it could almost be mistaken as a bad 16-bit game". Of common note by Electronic Gaming Monthly critics the poor detail and animation in the visuals, particularly with the players. Wrote Kujawa, "pitchers throw the ball with what seems to be about three frames of animation and the bat swings aren't much better." Another one of the magazine's reviewers, Shawn Smith, panned the audio's low fidelity.

== See also ==
- Chronology of baseball video games
- List of Nintendo 64 games
- Mike Piazza
