= Champion Baseball =

1983 video game

- Developer(s): Alpha Denshi
- Publisher(s): Sega
- Platform(s): Arcade, SG-1000
- Release: Arcade: JP: March 1983; NA: June 1983 SG-1000; JP: October 1983; PAL: 1983
- Genre(s): Sports (baseball)
- Mode(s): Up to 2 players, alternating turns

Champion Baseball (チャンピオン ベースボール) is an arcade baseball video game developed by Alpha Denshi and published by Sega in March 1983. It was a sophisticated sports video game for its time, displaying a split-screen format, with the playfield viewed from two camera angles, one from the outfield and another close-up shot of the batter and pitcher, while giving players the option of selecting relief pitchers or pinch hitters and with an umpire looking on attentively to make the game calls. The game also had digitized voices for the umpire, and individual player statistics. A person could play for hours with one token providing they tied scores at the 9th and further innings.

The game was a blockbuster success in Japanese arcades when released in 1983, and was a departure from the "space games" and "cartoon" action games that had previously dominated the arcades. It went on to serve as the prototype for later baseball video games. Nintendo, for example, released their own competitor Baseball later the same year.

== Gameplay ==
The player controls a baseball team, against a computer-controlled team, with the player batting at the top of each inning. In a two-player game, each will play independently against the computer, one inning at a time. Standard baseball rules apply, with the player awarded points for various accomplishments such as hitting a pitch, safely reaching any base, pitching a strike, getting a computer player out, or retiring the computer's side to end an inning.

Before play begins, the player can choose which city/state to represent from a list containing Los Angeles, Cincinnati, Atlanta, Pittsburg (probably a typo for Pittsburgh, Pennsylvania), Chicago, Montreal, St. Louis, Boston, Milwaukee, New York City, California and Texas (all of whom had major-league baseball franchises in 1983). The computer then randomly selects from among the remaining cities.

The game treats the bottom half of every inning as if it were the bottom of the ninth, so if at any time the computer team has scored more runs than the player, the game immediately ends. The high-scores list ("FAR OUT PLAYERS") can hold the initials of up to six players.

== Reception ==
The game was a blockbuster success upon release in Japanese arcades, at one point enjoying a level of popularity comparable to Space Invaders according to Sega. Like Space Invaders, there were many arcade locations across Japan dedicated exclusively to Champion Baseball. Sega had sold over 15,000 arcade units in Japan by early June 1983, and were expecting to ship a further 10,000 arcade units within the country by the end of June. It was Japan's highest-grossing arcade game around mid-1983.

When Japanese magazine Game Machine published their first bi-weekly arcade charts in their June 1, 1983 issue, Champion Baseball was listed as the most successful table arcade cabinet of the month. It remained at the top of the Game Machine table arcade game charts for three months through June and July to August 1983, before eventually being dethroned by Elevator Action in September. Champion Baseball remained in the top ten for the rest of the year, through December 1983.

In North America, the game was successful in test locations around mid-1983. Sega were expecting to repeat some of the game's Japanese success in North America, due to baseball being a popular sport in the region. Upon release in North America, it became one of the best-performing arcade video games distributed by Sega Electronics (formerly Sega/Gremlin) in 1983, but the golden age of arcade video games was coming to an end in North America, with Sega closing down its Sega Electronics division and selling it to Bally Manufacturing later that year.

== Legacy ==
Champion Baseball II was released the same year, with identical graphics but allowing two players to compete with each other. Game Machine listed the sequel on their October 1, 1983 issue as being the top-grossing new table arcade unit of the month. Another sequel, titled Super Champion Baseball, was released in 1989.

=== Impact ===
Upon release, the sports gameplay of Champion Baseball was a departure from the "space games" and "cartoon" action games that had previously dominated the arcades. Champion Baseball went on to serve as the prototype for later baseball video games. Nintendo, for example, later released their own competing sports game, Baseball, initially for the Famicom console in late 1983 and then ported to the arcade Nintendo VS. System as VS. Baseball in 1984. While VS. Baseball lacked certain features of Champion Baseball, it had improved multiplayer capabilities.
