= Roger Clemens' MVP Baseball =

1991 video game

- Roger Clemens' MVP Baseball cover art
- Developer: Sculptured Software
- Publishers: Acclaim Entertainment; LJN; Flying Edge
- Director: Perry Rodgers
- Designer: Perry Rodgers
- Composers: Paul Webb (Game Boy/NES); Mark Ganus, Kingsley Thurber (Super NES)
- Platforms: NES (1991), Super NES (1992, 1993), Sega Genesis (1992), Game Boy (1992, 1993)
- Release: 1991, 1992, 1993
- Genre: Traditional baseball simulation
- Modes: Single-player, multiplayer

Roger Clemens' MVP Baseball is a baseball video game released in North America in 1991 and 1992 for the NES, Game Boy, Super NES, and Sega Genesis. All of the players featured in the game have the likenesses and abilities of the 1991 Major League Baseball players they represent. However, since the game is not licensed by the Major League Baseball Players Association, the only player whose name appears in the game is the titular AL Cy Young Award Winner Roger Clemens. The 26 teams featured in the game correspond to the 1991 MLB teams as well, though team nicknames have been changed due to the lack of an MLB license.

In 1993, the game was released in Japan as MVP Baseball (ＭＶＰベースボール) and was only published for Nintendo's Game Boy and Super NES platforms.

Kingsley Thurber, the composer for Roger Clemens' MVP Baseball, also did the music for the Super NES version of Mortal Kombat along with Virtual Bart, Looney Tunes B-Ball and various WWF video games.

== Gameplay ==
The game features 26 teams to use, an exhibition mode and a regular season mode consisting of 162 games. The game allows players to "save" their career progress by giving them a password. Players must enter it at the menu screen when they want to continue the season.

The Super NES controls put more emphasis on defense rather than offense as the majority of possible move combinations correspond to pitching a baseball to the batter. Base running is considered to be of secondary importance in the game while batting is considered to be simple by Super NES standards.

== Player name humor ==
While many of the fictional players in the game have names that are simply mutations of their real names (i.e. "Gaddox" and "Fieldman" are Greg Maddux and Cecil Fielder respectively), the game programmers appear to have had a bit of fun with some of them, poking fun at the names of some of the real players they are intended to represent. Some examples follow below:

- Darryl Strawberry is "Raspberry" (or simply "Berry" in other versions of the game).
- Barry Bonds is "Barris".
- George Bell is "Dell".
- Steve Sax is "Clarinet".
- Joe Carter is "Carr".
- Jack Clark is "Dark".
- David Justice is "Judge".
- Darren Daulton is "Davis".
- Dwight Gooden is "Doctor", in reference to his nicknames "Doc", along with "Dr. K."
- Rob Deer is "Bambi", named after the fictional deer.
- Lenny Dykstra is "Nails", in reference to his nickname "Nails".
- Tim Raines is "Snows".
- David Cone is "Conehead," perhaps an homage to the comedy sketch which first appeared on Saturday Night Live and would later become a movie.
- Don Mattingly is "Matts".
- Mark McGwire and Jose Canseco are both named "Bash", in reference to their being nicknamed the "Bash Brothers" while teammates with the Oakland Athletics.
- Kirby Puckett is given the last name "Kirby" (or "Tripp" in other versions of the game).
- Kirk Gibson is "Gibbons".
- Vance Law is "Order", as in "Law and Order".
- Cal Ripken Jr. is "Nekpir", which is simply his last name spelled backwards.
- Ryne Sandberg is "Sharp".
- Ozzie Smith is "Wizard", after his well-known nickname.
- Frank Thomas is "Thompson".
- Tony Fernandez is "Nandez".
- Tony Gwynn is "Wynn".
- Mike Moore is "Less".
- Rickey Henderson is "Speed".
- Robin Ventura is "Vender".
- Dave Winfield is "Winbrener", in reference to Winfield's public feud with New York Yankees owner George Steinbrenner throughout the 1980s before his trade to the California Angels in 1990.

== Reception ==
Reception

Review score
Publication	Score
Electronic Gaming Monthly	6/10, 7/10, 5/10, 5/10 (NES)

Roger Clemens' MVP Baseball is scolded for having an inferior sense of gameplay to Bases Loaded 2, which was also a baseball game featuring an entirely fictional cast of ballplayers. The confusing angles for fielding essentially ruin the enjoyment of following the ball's shadow in order to put out a runner.
