= Great Ice Hockey =

1986 video game

- Developer: Sega
- Publisher: Sega
- Platform: Master System
- Release: NA: December 1986; JP: 1987 (Competition prize)
- Genre: Sports
- Modes: Single-player, multiplayer

Great Ice Hockey (Note: Japanese: グレートアイスホッケー) is an ice hockey video game released by Sega in 1986 for the Master System. The game requires Sega's Sports Pad. It is a part of the Great line of sports video games from Sega for the Master System in 1986 in North America and in 1987 in Japan (though only as a competition prize in Beep! magazine).

== Gameplay ==
The game plays as a regular hockey match. Two difficulty settings (junior and senior) are options for amateur or more skilled players. The player is assigned the US hockey team and then choose from a number of opponents from seven other countries: Poland, West Germany, Czechoslovakia, Finland, Canada, Sweden and USSR.

== See also ==
- Great Baseball
- Great Football
- Slap Shot
