= Great Football =

1987 video game

- Developer: Sega
- Publisher: Sega
- Platforms: Master System; Mega-Tech
- Release: 1987
- Genre: Sports
- Modes: Single-player, multiplayer

Great Football is a 1987 sports video game developed and published by Sega for the Master System and Mega-Tech.

== Gameplay ==
Great Football is a sports game based on American football, allowing up to two players, and is viewed from a top-down angle, featuring a horizontally oriented field. Each game is divided into four quarters, each lasting 15 minutes (although the game progresses at three times the speed of real time). There are no fouls in the game.

In one-player games, the game begins in the fourth quarter with the computer team leading by a random number of points, and the player has to surpass the computer's score during the duration of the quarter. If the player fails to gain ten yards after a set of four downs, instead of losing possession to the computer team (as is customary in real football), the player incurs a penalty of 10 yards and is given a new set of downs. Consequently, the player is perpetually on offense, and the only opportunities for the computer to score arise if the player's team is tackled in their own end zone for a safety or if the computer intercepts a pass and returns it to their end zone for a touchdown.

In two-player games, players play a conventional game of four quarters, beginning with both players having zero points. The second player opens the game with the kick-off, allowing the first player to start on offense. As in real football, if the player on offense completes a set of four downs without gaining 10 yards, the other team gets possession of the ball.

== Reception ==
Bill Kunkel for ANALOG Computing said, "Great Football is not exactly great, but offense junkies and players who can find opponents should get off on it." Julian Rignall for Computer + Video Games rated it 82%. Génération 4 gave it 69% overall. Mean Machines gave it 55% and said, "Suffering exactly the same problems as Joe Montana Football but even more so, Great Football is a limited, ugly-looking game which offers little in the way of excitement. Buy the far superior American Pro Football instead." Power Play rated the game with 4 joysticks. Sega MegaZone said, "Games that have a large amount of playability can often be forgiven for not having lush graphics. In this case it doesn't matter – the only thing worse than the graphics is the playability".

== See also ==
- Great Baseball
- Great Ice Hockey
