= NHL Breakaway 98 =

1997 video game

- Nintendo 64 box art featuring Keith Tkachuk
- Developer: Sculptured Software (Note: The Nintendo 64 version uses the Iguana Entertainment logo, as it was released after the developer rebranded as Iguana West)
- Publisher: Acclaim Entertainment (Note: Released under the Acclaim Sports label)
- Producer: Douglas Yellin
- Designers: J. David Elton; Rich Reagan; Chandler Holbrook
- Programmers: Thomas Carbone; Dave Lang; Christopher Braymen
- Platforms: PlayStation, Nintendo 64
- Release: PlayStation: NA: September 10, 1997; EU: 1997; Nintendo 64: NA: February 25, 1998; AU: March 1998; EU: 1998
- Genre: Sports
- Modes: Single-player, multiplayer

NHL Breakaway 98 is a 1997 ice hockey video game for the PlayStation and Nintendo 64. It was the first hockey game to come from Acclaim Entertainment and the first game released under the publisher's new Acclaim Sports label. The game met with divisive reviews upon its release for the PlayStation, though the game's management mode and its system of using points to improve aspects of a team received widespread praise, but reviews for the later Nintendo 64 version were more consistently favorable. It was followed by a sequel, NHL Breakaway 99, released the following year.

== Gameplay ==
NHL Breakaway 98 has a momentum-based checking system. Players can out-skate and out-muscle each other, depending on a player's size and speed. Some players are small but fast, while others are slow but possess strength and size. If a large, fast player such as Eric Lindros gets moving at high speed, the power behind his check is greater than what someone like Pierre Turgeon could produce.

Two players can compete in the Versus mode. If a player is edited, the name and number appear on the player's back. The game does not feature play-by-play announcers, but there is a public address announcer that only speaks when penalties are called, and when a player scores a goal, the name and number are said.

The Nintendo 64 version has Rumble Pak support.

== Development ==
A Sega Saturn version was also in development, and was the last Saturn title to be dropped from Acclaim's release schedule when the publisher withdrew their support from the Saturn.

== Reception ==
Reception

Aggregate score
Aggregator	Score	
Aggregator	N64	PS
GameRankings	78%	66%

Review scores
Publication	Score	
Publication	N64	PS
AllGame	2.5/5	2/5
CNET Gamecenter	7/10	7/10
Electronic Gaming Monthly	7.25/10	N/A
Game Informer	8.25/10	7.75/10
GameFan	N/A	75% (Note: In GameFan's viewpoint of the PlayStation version, one critic gave it a score of 76, and the other 74.)
GameRevolution	N/A	C−
GameSpot	7.8/10	7.9/10
Hyper	87%	N/A
IGN	7.4/10	7/10
N64 Magazine	62%	N/A
Next Generation	N/A	3/5
Nintendo Power	7.6/10	N/A
Official U.S. PlayStation Magazine	N/A	3/5

Reviewers were split about the PlayStation version; GameSpot and IGN both hailed it as a strong entrance into the crowded hockey genre by Acclaim, while GamePro and Next Generation opined that though it has some good features (the management mode and its point system were almost uniformly praised by critics), it fails to effectively compete against established franchises from EA Sports (NHL) and Sony Computer Entertainment (NHL FaceOff). Where Next Generation said the graphics are rough and GamePro said the players move stiffly, GameSpot and IGN both said the graphics and animation are incredibly detailed and lifelike. And while GameSpot asserted that "Even my puck-head of a roommate who is still addicted to NHL 96 for the Sega Genesis could immediately play Breakaway without being intimidated by the control", GamePro maintained that "the unruly movements of your players make controlling them very frustrating", and Next Generation found that "The speed is so intense that it takes away from the control and strategy by making the game a bit random. Often a goal will happen and no one realizes it until the players start to celebrate." IGN, which called the momentum-based checking "one of the most innovative features ever to appear in a hockey game", summarized that "Acclaim has definitely poured its hearts into its initial entry -- and it shows." On the other side, Next Generation concluded that "Breakaway is a solid hockey game that would've been best a year ago. However, strong showings by all the major competitors make this one that can be missed."

GamePro concluded of the PlayStation version, "If you want theme park set to a hockey beat, then Breakaway is for you. If you want quality action and gameplay, wait for a Stanley Cup contender like Face Off '98 [sic] or NHL 98." (Note: GamePro gave the PlayStation version 3.5/5 for graphics, 3.0/5 for sound, 3.0/5 for control, and 3.0/5 for fun factor.) Five issues later, however, they said of the Nintendo 64 version, "Breakaway offers a solid sim-hockey experience that, until now, has been missing on the N64. So if you're looking for something a little more like the real thing, you'd do well to hit the ice with this title." They remarked that the Nintendo 64 version has more polished graphics, more fluid animation, and better control than the PlayStation version. (Note: GamePro gave the Nintendo 64 version 4.5/5 for graphics, 4.5/5 for fun factor, 4.0/5 for sound, and 4.0/5 for control.) Electronic Gaming Monthly likewise described it as "light-years ahead of its PlayStation counterpart in nearly every aspect", as well as praising the management mode and animation, though their four reviewers disagreed on how good the A.I. is.

IGN also considered the Nintendo 64 version an improvement over the PlayStation original, noting that it has interesting new camera modes and that the speed was reduced to make the game more playable, though they added that the latter made the game feel slightly sluggish at points. GameSpot instead said that the two versions are "practically the same game", and while they praised the new camera modes and improved control, they argued that the graphics are not as crisp as the PlayStation version's. They judged that it overall maintained the excellence of the PlayStation version, and "seems to have everything going for it: great graphics, superb sound, unmatched control". Electronic Gaming Monthly, IGN, and GamePro all compared it favorably to the three Wayne Gretzky/Nagano Olympics games for the Nintendo 64, describing it as both deeper and more realistic.

At the time of the review aggregation website GameRankings' closure in 2019, the Nintendo 64 version held a 78% based on 12 reviews, and the PlayStation version held a 66% based on 5 reviews.
