= Frank Thomas' Big Hurt =

1995 pinball machine

- Manufacturer: Gottlieb
- Release date: June, 1995
- Design: Bill Parker
- Artwork: Susan O'Reilly, Constantino Mitchell, Jeanine Mitchell
- Music: Duane Decker
- Sound: Craig Beierwaltes
- Production run: 1,985

Frank Thomas' Big Hurt is a pinball machine designed by Bill Parker and released by Gottlieb in 1995. The game features a baseball theme and is named after Frank Thomas.

== Description ==
The playfield of the game is laid out like a stadium with roaring crowds, a play-by-play announcer and features a moving baseball glove. The game has three flippers, two pop bumpers, two slingshots, drop targets, a captive ball, and a four-ball multi-ball.

The artwork of the sidebox is very bright and the head artwork features a flaming baseball.

== Digital versions ==
Frank Thomas' Big Hurt is available as a licensed table of The Pinball Arcade for several platforms. Reebok logos are removed because of licensing issues.

== See also ==
Frank Thomas Big Hurt Baseball, a video game
