= Baseball (1983 video game) =

1983 video game

- North American NES box art
- Developers: Nintendo R&D1; Intelligent Systems
- Publisher: Nintendo
- Designer: Shigeru Miyamoto
- Artist: Shigeru Miyamoto
- Composers: Yukio Kaneoka; Hirokazu Tanaka
- Platforms: Nintendo Entertainment System, arcade, Famicom Disk System, Game Boy, Nintendo e-Reader
- Release: December 7, 1983: NES; JP: December 7, 1983; NA: October 18, 1985; EU: September 1, 1986 Arcade (VS. Baseball); NA: April 1984; JP: May 1984; EU: 1986 Famicom Disk System; JP: February 21, 1986 Game Boy; JP: April 21, 1989; NA: August 1, 1989; EU: September 28, 1990
- Genre: Sports (baseball)
- Modes: Single-player, multiplayer
- Arcade system: Nintendo VS. System, PlayChoice-10

Baseball (Note: Japanese: ベースボール, Hepburn: Bēsubōru) is a baseball video game developed and published by Nintendo for the Family Computer (Famicom). It was originally released in Japan on December 7, 1983, a few months after the July 15 launch of the Famicom.

An arcade version titled VS. Baseball released for the Nintendo VS. System in 1984, featuring enhanced graphics and speech, becoming a hit at Japanese and American arcades. The game was later released as launch title for the Nintendo Entertainment System in North America in 1985, and in Europe in 1986. It was also ported to the Game Boy in 1989 as one of the handheld's four launch titles.

IGN noted that the universal appeal of baseball made the game instrumental in the NES's successful test market launch and regarded it as an important part of Nintendo's early history. At the time, it competed with Sega's arcade hit Champion Baseball, released earlier in 1983.

== Gameplay ==
As in real baseball, the object of the game is to score the most runs. The game supports one player versus a computer opponent, or two players. Each player can select from one of six teams.

Despite the game lacking a license of official team names, their initials in the game correspond to the Japanese Central League or the American Major League Baseball teams in their respective regions. The only gameplay difference between teams is the uniform colors.

== Development and release ==
Shigeru Miyamoto recalled that in 1983, he "personally really wanted there to be a Baseball game" for the Famicom, and was "directly in charge of the character design and the game design". The Famicom had only three launch day games on July 15, 1983, and Baseball was released on December 7—totaling seven games by 1984. It was ported to the arcade VS. System as VS. Baseball in 1984; another arcade version for the PlayChoice-10 was released two years later.

At the 1985 launch of the Nintendo Entertainment System in the Manhattan initial test market, the game was featured prominently among 17 total games. It was demonstrated on a large projector screen, by real Major League Baseball athletes who played the video game and signed autographs for fans. Because the video game industry was so young and had crashed in America in 1983, and because some other NES launch games like Clu Clu Land have abstract fantasy themes that are not instantly recognizable by a new audience, the presence of a traditional American pastime was said to be an instantly relatable aid to the system's introduction.

A Game Boy version was released as a launch title for the console. The NES version was released on the e-Reader for the Game Boy Advance as well as a bonus in Animal Crossing for the GameCube. Both console versions were released multiple times via the Virtual Console and Nintendo Classics services. VS. Baseball was released by Hamster Corporation as part of the Arcade Archives series for the Nintendo Switch on June 19, 2020.

== Reception ==
In Japan, 2.35 million copies of the original Famicom version of Baseball were sold. Worldwide, 3.2 million copies were sold for Famicom and NES.

Game Machine magazine named VS. Baseball as Japan's most successful table arcade cabinet of June and July 1984. In the United States, VS. Baseball topped the arcade software conversion kit charts for several months in 1984: the RePlay charts from September through October to November, and the Play Meter charts from October to November. Play Meter also listed it as the top-grossing arcade game in December 1984. In Europe, it had become a popular arcade game by 1986.

In 2007, IGN gave Baseball a 5.5 out of 10, noting its depth of pitching, its two-player support, "its still-intact sense of fun", and its important place in Nintendo's history. The review said that the 1985 test market launch of the Nintendo Entertainment System had "heavily relied upon" Baseball, due to the globally recognizable status of the sport. The review summarized that "the NES came out a winner—thanks, in part, to Baseball".

In 2006, GameSpot gave Baseball a 4.2 out of 10, stating that while it was easy to play, the "bare-bones" replica of the sport "hasn't withstood the test of time".

In 2020, historian Ken Horowitz said VS. Baseball (1984) lacks certain features of the competing Sega's Champion Baseball (1983), but has superior multiplayer capabilities.

Baseball was a significant source of inspiration for Namco's Pro Baseball: Family Stadium (1986) for Famicom, which became the R.B.I. Baseball series.
