= Great Baseball =

1987 video game

- Developer: Sega
- Publisher: Sega
- Platform: Master System
- Release: NA: March 1987; EU: September 1988; The Pro Yakyū: Pennant Race: JP: August 17, 1987
- Genre: Sports
- Modes: Single-player, multiplayer

Great Baseball is a baseball video game developed and published by Sega for the Master System in 1987 as part of the "Great" series of sports video games. This game is different to the game of the same name released in Japan and Taiwan. An upgraded version of this Great Baseball would later that year be released in Japan as The Pro Yakyū: Pennant Race.

== Gameplay ==
In this game, the player takes on the role of a manager and can field a total of 26 teams to battle for the league championship. The player either starts with offense or defense, playing through 9 innings as in a standard game of baseball. Team 1 goes to bat first and Team 2 goes to bat second. In a single player game, once the team in selected, the computer automatically selects the CPU controlled opponent. In two player games, each player can select their own team, but they have to be from the same league.

Once the starting pitcher is selected, the player can choose a specialty ball and stamina level. With more stamina, pitch speed and accuracy last longer. When batting, players are allowed up to four pinch hitters in each game. Pinch hitters are selected for a given inning just before the team goes up to bat. Players can select any player in the field except the catcher.

== Reception ==
Great Baseball received mixed reviews from critics. Computer and Video Games gave the game a 76 out of 100. Stating in their review that, sound, graphics and animation were all of high quality. The primary flaw of the game was that the nature of baseball made it poorly suited to a video game. "Baseball doesn't flow particularly well as a game in the same way that soccer does". Complaints about the common stopping and starting with switches between pitcher, hitter and catchers preventing a full immersion into the game were also made. The review did note that those who like real baseball would be pleased with the game. In a 2011 review, Marc Golding gave the game a score of 3 out of 10. Common complaints about the game include poor visuals and sounds. Other complaints noted difficult or unresponsive controls.

Great Baseball reviews
Reviewer	Date	Score
Power Play	July 1988	7/10
Computer and Video Games (CVG)	January 1989	76%
Console XS	April 23, 1992	75%
The Video Game Critic	April 18, 2004	F
HonestGamers	June 3, 2011	3/10

== See also ==
- Great Football
- Great Ice Hockey
