= All-Star Baseball 2004 =

2003 baseball video game

- Developers: Acclaim Studios Austin; Acclaim Studios Manchester (GBA)
- Publisher: Acclaim Entertainment (Note: Released under the Acclaim Sports label)
- Series: All-Star Baseball
- Platforms: GameCube; Xbox; PlayStation 2; Game Boy Advance
- Release: GameCube, Xbox, & Game Boy Advance: NA: February 28, 2003; PlayStation 2: NA: March 4, 2003; EU: May 2, 2003
- Genre: Sports
- Modes: Single-player, multiplayer

All Star Baseball 2004 is a baseball video game developed by Acclaim Studios Austin and Acclaim Studios Manchester and published by Acclaim Entertainment in 2003. It features Derek Jeter on the cover. The Xbox version of the game had the ability to download rosters from Xbox Live.

== Reception ==
Reception

Aggregate score
Aggregator	Score			
Aggregator	GBA	GameCube	PS2	Xbox
Metacritic	73/100	80/100	78/100	74/100

Review scores
Publication	Score			
Publication	GBA	GameCube	PS2	Xbox
AllGame	3/5	N/A	N/A	N/A
Electronic Gaming Monthly	N/A	N/A	N/A	5.17/10
Game Informer	6.5/10	N/A	8/10	8/10
GamePro	N/A	4/5	4/5	4/5
GameSpot	7.7/10	8.3/10	8.3/10	8.3/10
GameSpy	N/A	3/5	4/5	4/5
GameZone	N/A	7/10	8/10	N/A
IGN	8/10	8/10	8.1/10	8/10
Nintendo Power	3.8/5	4.1/5	N/A	N/A
Official U.S. PlayStation Magazine	N/A	N/A	3/5	N/A
Official Xbox Magazine (US)	N/A	N/A	N/A	7.7/10

The GameCube and PlayStation 2 versions received "generally favorable reviews", while the Game Boy Advance and Xbox versions received "average" reviews, according to the review aggregation website Metacritic. GameSpot asserted that the GameCube version has slightly better graphics than the PlayStation 2 version, but that the PS2 and original Xbox version were superior for their ability of the player to download updated player rosters.
