= NHL Breakaway 99 =

1998 video game

- Developer: Iguana West
- Publisher: Acclaim Entertainment (Note: Released under the Acclaim Sports label)
- Platform: Nintendo 64
- Release: NA: November 30, 1998; EU: December 1998
- Genre: Sports
- Modes: Single-player, multiplayer

NHL Breakaway 99 is an ice hockey game for the Nintendo 64 and is a sequel to NHL Breakaway 98. It was released in 1998, The cover art features Steve Yzerman of the Detroit Red Wings.

== Features ==
The game features the same features as Breakaway 98 did: a season mode, practice mode, playoff mode and an exhibition mode. It features all the NHL teams.

== Reception ==
Reception

Aggregate score
Aggregator	Score
GameRankings	60%

Review scores
Publication	Score
Electronic Gaming Monthly	4/10, 4/10, 4.5/10, 4/10
Game Informer	6/10
GamePro	2/5
GameSpot	6.9/10
IGN	6/10
N64 Magazine	64%
Next Generation	2/5
Nintendo Power	7.1/10

Next Generation reviewed the Nintendo 64 version of the game, rating it two stars out of five, and stated that "NHL Breakaway '99 is nothing more than last year's version with the new rosters and rules. Try to convince us otherwise, you're wasting your breath."

The game received "mixed" reviews according to the review aggregation website GameRankings.
