= All-Star Baseball 2003 =

2002 video game

- Developers: Acclaim Studios Austin; Creations (GBA)
- Publisher: Acclaim Entertainment (Note: Released under the Acclaim Sports label.)
- Series: All-Star Baseball
- Platforms: GameCube, Xbox, PlayStation 2, Game Boy Advance
- Release: GameCube, PlayStation 2, Xbox: NA: March 7, 2002; EU: May 31, 2002 (Xbox); EU: June 7, 2002 (PS2); JP: August 8, 2002 (Xbox, GameCube); JP: November 14, 2002 (PS2); Game Boy Advance: NA: May 7, 2002
- Genre: Sports game
- Modes: Single-player, multiplayer

All Star Baseball 2003 is a 2002 baseball video game developed by Acclaim Studios Austin and published by Acclaim Entertainment. The game features Derek Jeter on the cover.

There are several different modes of play, such as exhibition, managing an existing Major League Baseball team, creating a team or creating a player. Many United States cities are available for "expansion", in addition to Mexico City and Puerto Rico.

== Reception ==
Reception

Aggregate score
Aggregator	Score			
Aggregator	GBA	GameCube	PS2	Xbox
Metacritic	77/100	83/100	81/100	79/100

Review scores
Publication	Score			
Publication	GBA	GameCube	PS2	Xbox
AllGame	3/5	N/A	3.5/5	3.5/5
Electronic Gaming Monthly	N/A	7/10	N/A	7/10
Famitsu	N/A	25/40	N/A	26/40
Game Informer	8/10	9/10	9/10	9/10
GamePro	N/A	4.5/5	N/A	N/A
GameRevolution	N/A	N/A	N/A	B+
GameSpot	7.3/10	8/10	8.6/10	8.4/10
GameSpy	N/A	67%	N/A	68%
GameZone	8.2/10	7/10	8.5/10	7.4/10
IGN	7.8/10	8.3/10	8.9/10	8.9/10
Nintendo Power	N/A	3.2/5	N/A	N/A
Official U.S. PlayStation Magazine	N/A	N/A	3.5/5	N/A
Official Xbox Magazine (US)	N/A	N/A	N/A	6.2/10

The game received "generally favorable reviews" on all platforms according to the review aggregation website Metacritic. In Japan, where the GameCube and Xbox versions were ported for release on August 8, 2002, followed by the PS2 version on November 14, 2002, Gamespot praised the game for being an improvement over their prior year's entry, stating "All-Star Baseball 2003 is what last year's game would have become if it hadn't been rushed out the door to make the GameCube's launch." Famitsu gave it a score of 25 out of 40 for the GameCube version, and 26 out of 40 for the Xbox version.

By the end of 2002, the game sold over 563,000 copies in North America, becoming the best-selling baseball game of the year in the region. The game sold over 600,000 copies worldwide, becoming the best-selling title in the series.
