= Frank Thomas =

American baseball player (born 1968)

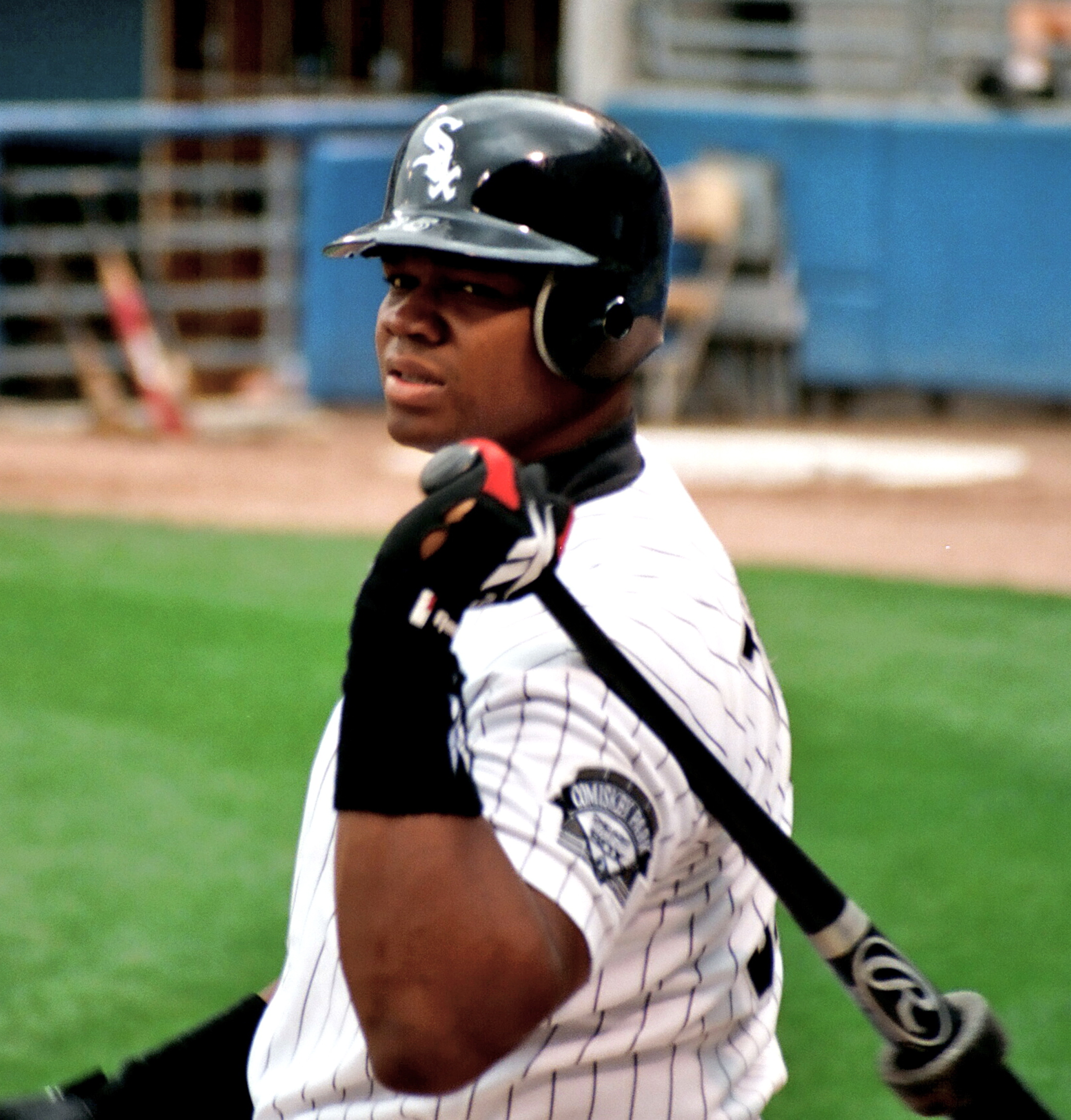
- Thomas with the Chicago White Sox in 1997
- Designated hitter / First baseman
- Born: May 27, 1968 (age 58); Columbus, Georgia, U.S.
- Batted: Right Threw: Right

MLB debut
- August 2, 1990, for the Chicago White Sox

Last MLB appearance
- August 29, 2008, for the Oakland Athletics

MLB statistics
- Batting average: .301
- Hits: 2,468
- Home runs: 521
- Runs batted in: 1,704
- Stats at Baseball Reference

Teams
- Chicago White Sox (1990–2005); Oakland Athletics (2006); Toronto Blue Jays (2007–2008); Oakland Athletics (2008)

Career highlights and awards
- 5× All-Star (1993–1997); 2× AL MVP (1993, 1994); 4× Silver Slugger Award (1991, 1993, 1994, 2000); AL batting champion (1997); Chicago White Sox No. 35 retired

Member of the National

Baseball Hall of Fame
- Induction: 2014
- Vote: 83.7% (first ballot)

Frank Edward Thomas Jr. (born May 27, 1968), nicknamed "the Big Hurt," is an American former baseball designated hitter and first baseman in Major League Baseball (MLB). He played for three American League (AL) teams from 1990 to 2008, all but the last three years with the Chicago White Sox. A five-time All-Star, he is the only player in major league history to have seven consecutive seasons (1991–1997) with at least a .300 batting average, 100 runs batted in (RBI), 100 runs scored, 100 walks, and 20 home runs. Thomas also won the AL batting title in 1997 with a .347 mark. Thomas is a two-time AL MVP and won a World Series in 2005 although he was injured during the regular season and World Series. Thomas is widely considered one of the greatest right-handed hitters in MLB history.

Drafted seventh overall by the White Sox in the 1989 MLB draft, Thomas made his major league debut the following year and immediately impressed with his hitting ability. Thomas was named the AL's Most Valuable Player (MVP) by unanimous vote in 1993. That year, he became the first White Sox player to hit 40 home runs and led the team to a division title. He repeated as MVP in the strike-shortened 1994 season, batting .353 and leading the league in slugging percentage and runs. Following two sub-par seasons, Thomas lost a close MVP vote in 2000 despite posting career highs of 43 home runs and 143 RBI. Still, he was named AL Comeback Player of the Year, and Chicago finished with the AL's best record. Later in Thomas's career, a variety of foot injuries and minor ailments reduced his productivity and often limited him to a designated hitter role. In 2005, his final season in Chicago, he was limited to only 34 games after starting the year on the disabled list and then fracturing a bone in his foot close to where it was surgically repaired the previous off-season. He was unable to play in the post-season while the White Sox won the World Series that year. After leaving the White Sox, Thomas spent his last three years playing first for the Oakland Athletics and then the Toronto Blue Jays, with whom he hit his 500th home run, before returning to the A's for part of 2008, his last stop as a player. He signed a one-day contract with the White Sox in 2010, then announced his retirement.

By the end of his career, Thomas was tied for eighth in AL history for home runs (521), ninth for RBI (1,704), and sixth for walks (1,667). Among players with at least 7,000 at bats in the AL, he ranked eighth in slugging average (.555) and ninth in on-base percentage (.419). With a .301 lifetime batting average, he became the seventh player in history to retire with at least a .300 average and 500 home runs. He holds White Sox franchise records for career home runs (448), RBI (1,465), runs (1,327), doubles (447), extra base hits, walks (1,466), slugging average, (.568) and on-base percentage (.427). The White Sox retired Thomas's uniform number 35 in 2010 and unveiled a statue of him at U.S. Cellular Field in 2011. Thomas was elected to the Baseball Hall of Fame in 2014 in his first year of eligibility—the first White Sox star to achieve that distinction.

Thomas was one of the few major league stars who never fell under suspicion during the performance-enhancing drugs controversies of the late 1990s. An advocate for drug testing as early as 1995, he was the only active player who agreed to be interviewed for the Mitchell Report in 2007.

== Early life and college ==
Thomas was born and raised in Columbus, Georgia, and attended Columbus High School, where he was a standout in both football and baseball. As a sophomore, he hit cleanup for the baseball team, which won a state championship. As a senior, he not only hit .440, but also was named an All-State tight end in football, and played forward with the basketball team. He wanted desperately to win a contract to play professional baseball, but was not selected in the 1986 amateur draft. "I was shocked and sad," Thomas recalled in the Chicago Tribune. "I saw a lot of guys I played against get drafted, and I knew they couldn't do what I could do. But I've had people all my life saying you can't do this, you can't do that. It scars you. No matter how well I've done. People have misunderstood me for some reason. I was always one of the most competitive kids around."

In the autumn of 1986, Thomas accepted a scholarship to play football at Auburn University. His love of baseball drew him to the school's baseball team, where the coach immediately recognized his potential. "We loved him," Auburn baseball coach Hal Baird told Sports Illustrated. "He was fun to be around—always smiling, always bright-eyed." He was also a tremendous hitter, posting a .359 batting average and leading the Tigers in RBI as a freshman. During summer 1987, he played for the U.S. Pan American Team, earning a spot on the final roster in the Pan American Games. The Games coincided with the beginning of football practice back at Auburn, so he left the Pan Am team and returned to college—only to be injured twice in early-season football games. In the summer of 1988, Thomas played for the Orleans Cardinals of the Cape Cod Baseball League. Highlights included a three-homer game in Wareham, as well as a home run over the 434' sign in center field at Eldredge Park in Orleans. In 2000, Thomas was named a member of the inaugural class of the Cape Cod Baseball League Hall of Fame.

Despite the injury that could have jeopardized his football scholarship, Auburn continued his funding, and baseball became his sole sport. He won consideration for the U.S. National Team—preparing for the 1988 Summer Olympics—but was cut from the final squad. By the end of his junior baseball season, he had hit 19 home runs, 19 doubles, and batted .403 with a slugging percentage of .801. Thomas concluded his college career with 49 home runs, a school record. In May 2011, he was inducted into the Alabama Sports Hall of Fame.

== Professional career ==
=== Chicago White Sox ===
==== Early years (1990–1996) ====
The Chicago White Sox selected Thomas with the seventh pick in the first round of the June 1989 Major League Baseball draft. He made his major league debut on August 2, 1990, against the Milwaukee Brewers at County Stadium; he went without a hit, going 0-for-4, but had an RBI on a fielder's choice which scored Iván Calderón as the White Sox won the game 4–3. On August 28, Thomas hit the first home run of his career in a road game against the Minnesota Twins at the Metrodome (which, coincidentally, would also be the site of his 500th career home run). He hit the home run off pitcher Gary Wayne in the top of the ninth inning as his team lost 12–6. Thomas played in 60 games with the White Sox in 1990, batting .330 with seven home runs and 31 runs batted in (RBI).

Thomas became known for his menacing home run power; in the on-deck circle, he routinely swung a rusted piece of rebar that he reportedly found during a renovation project in Old Comiskey Park. In his first full season, Thomas established himself as a multi-talented hitter, combining power with hitting for average, drawing walks, and driving in runs. In 1991, Thomas finished third in MVP voting with a .318 batting average, 32 home runs and 109 RBI, as well as 138 walks. He won the first of four Silver Slugger Awards, and led the league in on-base percentage, something he would accomplish four times during his career.

In 1993, Thomas batted .317 with a club-record 41 homers, 128 RBI, 106 runs scored, and 112 walks. He joined a quartet of Hall of Famers (Babe Ruth, Lou Gehrig, Jimmie Foxx and Ted Williams) as the only players in baseball history to eclipse .300 with more than 20 homers and more than 100 RBI, runs, and walks in three straight seasons. On the back of this historic offensive output, Thomas collected all 28 votes from baseball writers for a unanimous AL Most Valuable Player award, the first by a White Sox player since Dick Allen in 1972, while leading the White Sox to their first AL West crown in 10 years. At the time, statistical analyst Bill James projected career statistics of 480 homers and a .311 lifetime average. Then-manager Gene Lamont was laudatory of Thomas' skills: "I've only seen him two years now, but I'm convinced that there isn't a pitch he can't hit." White Sox announcer Ken Harrelson echoed the praise, "In my 30 years in the game, I've never seen anyone like Big Hurt [Thomas]. In another 30 years, we may be talking about Frank Thomas in the same way we talk about Ted Williams." Thomas credited Harrelson with coining the "Big Hurt" nickname.

In 1994, playing just 113 games due to a strike-shortened season, Thomas again put up huge offensive numbers, batting .353 with 38 homers and 101 RBI, and he led the league in runs scored (106), walks (109), and slugging percentage with a whopping .729 mark. Thomas handily won his second consecutive MVP award, taking 24 of 28 first-place votes. He is one of only three first basemen in history to win consecutive MVP awards in the major leagues (Hall of Famer Jimmie Foxx, 1932–1933, and Albert Pujols, 2008–2009, are the others).

The 1994 shortened season was due to a players' strike, and perhaps no one felt the sting of the strike more than Thomas, who stood poised to achieve one of baseball's most prestigious honors: the Triple Crown. Not since 1967 had any player finished the regular season first in average, home runs, and runs batted in. Thomas had recorded 32 home runs at the All-Star break, and was contending for the honor when the strike occurred. Pressed by the media to comment on his accomplishments—and his future—Thomas downplayed his own significance, telling the Atlanta Journal-Constitution: "I'm not into being known as the best by fans or the media. I care how I'm perceived by my peers. I can settle for the label 'one of the best' because that means you're considered an elite player."

Thomas would continue putting up significant well-rounded offensive numbers, always placing in the top finishers in all major offensive categories, though rarely leading in any one stat. In 1995, he hit .308 with 40 homers and 111 RBI; in 1996, he hit .349 with 40 home runs and 134 RBI, and became an All-Star for the fourth time while finishing eighth in MVP voting.

==== Later years (1997–2005) ====
From 1991 to 1997, Thomas finished in the top 10 of the MVP voting every year. In 1997, Thomas won the batting title and finished third in MVP voting. However, due in part to personal strife off the field, his offensive production wavered during the next two seasons. Never a defensive standout at first base during the early part of his career, Thomas nonetheless preferred playing in the field to being a designated hitter, saying that it kept him focused; the fact that he did generally hit better as a first baseman created a dilemma over the years for the White Sox as to whether to use him as a DH, which would reduce wear on his body but might cost some offensive production. By the late 1990s, minor injuries were tending to keep him unavailable for short periods, and 1997 was the last year in which he played more in the field than as a DH. Thomas rebounded with force in 2000 when he hit .328 with a career-high 43 homers and 143 RBI. Thomas finished second in MVP voting that season, behind Jason Giambi of the Oakland Athletics. Thomas also won the 2000 AL Comeback Player of the Year Award. But this would not mean an end to the rocky path he would follow later in his career.

In 2001, after his father died, Thomas also announced during the same week that he would undergo season-ending surgery after an MRI revealed a triceps tear in his right arm. He was distraught from the combined impact of both personal and professional strife. "This is the worst week of my life," he said during a press conference in Chicago. "First I lose my father, then come back and find out I'm lost for the season." He only played in 20 games that year, batting just .221 with four home runs and 10 RBI.

He rebounded from his injury and played in 148 games in 2002, but hit just .252, a career-low for a complete season, and would never again approach a .300 batting average. However, his power and ability to get on base and drive in runs were still in his offensive arsenal, and he finished the season with 28 home runs and 92 RBI. Always a patient hitter, Thomas led the AL in walks four times. Through the end of the 2006 season, he was second among all active players in walks and third in on-base percentage, and ranked among the top 20 lifetime in both categories.

Thomas had another solid season in 2003. He tied for second in the AL in home runs (42), and was in the league's top ten in walks, extra base hits, slugging average, and on-base plus slugging, as he led the major leagues in fly ball percentage (54.9%). In 2005, Thomas again suffered from injury, but hit 12 home runs in 105 at-bats over 35 games, demonstrating his continued power at the plate. Adding together 2004 and 2005, he had fewer than 350 total at-bats because of injuries, but hit 30 home runs and drew 80 walks. As a member of the White Sox, Thomas and teammate Magglio Ordóñez tied a major league record for back-to-back homers, with six in one season.

==== 2005 World Series ====
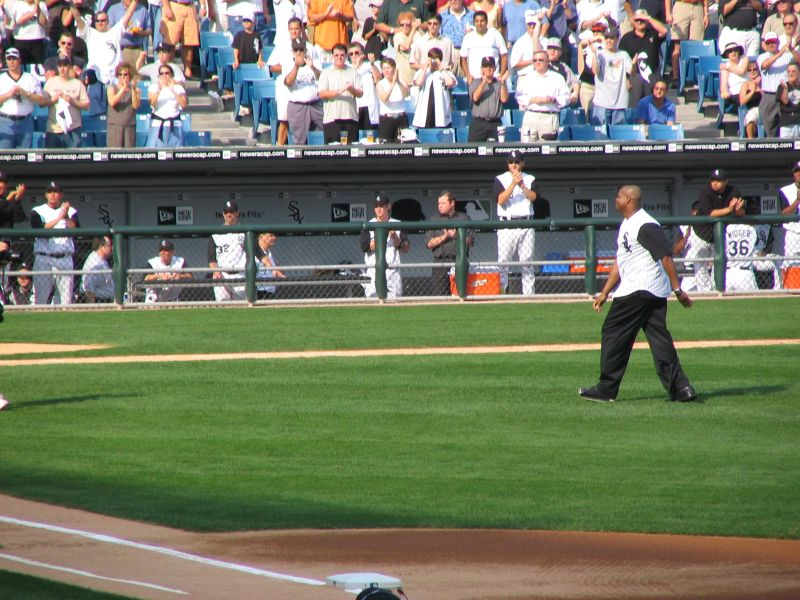
Frank Thomas throws out the ceremonial first pitch of the 2005 ALDS between the White Sox and Red Sox.

In 2005, manager Ozzie Guillén led the White Sox to a World Series victory, their first in 88 years. Thomas was not on the postseason roster of the Series-winning team due to injury, but the team honored his perennial contributions to the franchise during Game 1 of the Division Series against the Boston Red Sox. Thomas was chosen to throw out the ceremonial first pitch. "What a feeling," Thomas said. "Standing [ovation] all around the place. People really cheering me. I had tears in my eyes. To really know the fans cared that much about me—it was a great feeling. One of my proudest moments in the game." Though Thomas was not on the postseason roster, he did earn a World Series ring for his contributions during the season.

==== Departure (2005) ====
Thomas established several White Sox batting records, including all-time leader in runs scored (1,327), home runs (448), doubles (447), RBI (1,465), extra-base hits (906), walks (1,466), total bases (3,949), slugging percentage (.568), and on-base percentage (.427). At the time he left the team, his 448 home runs were more than twice as many as any other individual player had hit for the White Sox in their 105-year history.

Despite his perennial offensive production and established fan base in Chicago, the White Sox elected to release Thomas in 2005. Thomas later expressed disappointment with how his 16-year tenure with the White Sox was ended, saying that chairman Jerry Reinsdorf did not call him to tell him he wasn't coming back. He also said that he and Kenny Williams did not see eye-to-eye after Williams became general manager following the 2000 season. At the time, Thomas was unhappy that his next-to-last deal with the White Sox contained a "diminished skills" clause. He said the White Sox should have traded him after the playoffs that season.

"I've got a lot of respect for Jerry Reinsdorf, I do. But I really thought, the relationship we had over the last 16 years, he would have picked up the phone to say, 'Big guy, we're moving forward. We're going somewhere different. We don't know your situation or what's going to happen.' I can live with that, I really can," Thomas said. "But treating me like some passing-by-player. I've got no respect for that." Thomas said he was not bitter or angry and had joined the A's with an open mind.

=== Oakland Athletics (2006) ===
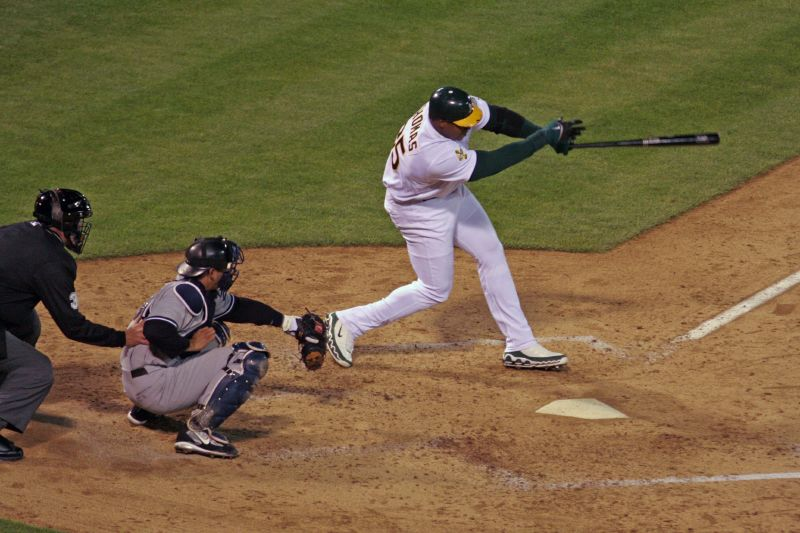
Thomas mid-swing on April 3, 2006

Thomas signed with the Oakland Athletics to a one-year, $500,000 deal with incentives on January 26, 2006. The Athletics installed Thomas as their everyday DH. He started the season slowly, hitting .178 through May 20, but ended the season as the team leader in home runs, RBI, slugging percentage, and on-base percentage. He provided a powerful right-handed bat in the middle of the lineup for the division-leading Athletics. He had a stretch from September 5 to September 11 where he hit a home run in six straight games.

On May 22, 2006, Thomas homered twice in his first game against his former team. Before Thomas came up to lead off the second inning, a musical montage played on the Jumbotron at U.S. Cellular Field, paying tribute to Thomas's legacy with the White Sox. He was cheered in his introduction by the White Sox fans. Moments later, when he hit his first home run of the night to put his former team behind in the score 1–0, the Chicago crowd gave Thomas a standing ovation.

Thomas rejuvenated his career playing with the Athletics, placing fifth in the American League with 39 home runs and eighth with 114 RBI. He also was key to the team's stretch drive to the playoffs: for the week ending September 10, he was the league's player of the week after hitting .462 with five homers and 13 RBI. The 2006 postseason provided Thomas the opportunity to play in his first postseason games since 2000 due to having missed the 2005 playoffs with an injury, when the Athletics clinched the American League West title, defeating the Seattle Mariners 12–3 on September 26. During the A's first playoff game on October 3, Thomas hit two solo home runs, leading the A's to a 3–2 win over the Twins. His performance during the opening playoff game earned Thomas the distinction of being the oldest player to hit multiple home runs in a postseason game. He led the A's to an ALDS victory, going 5-for-10 with two home runs in the series. In the 2006 ALCS, he went 0-for-13 in what turned out to be his last postseason appearance.

On October 7, 2006, Thomas finished behind Jim Thome, his replacement as the White Sox's DH, in the voting for the AL Comeback Player of the Year Award. He was awarded the AL players' choice award for Comeback Player. He finished fourth in the vote for the MVP award.

=== Toronto Blue Jays (2007–2008) ===
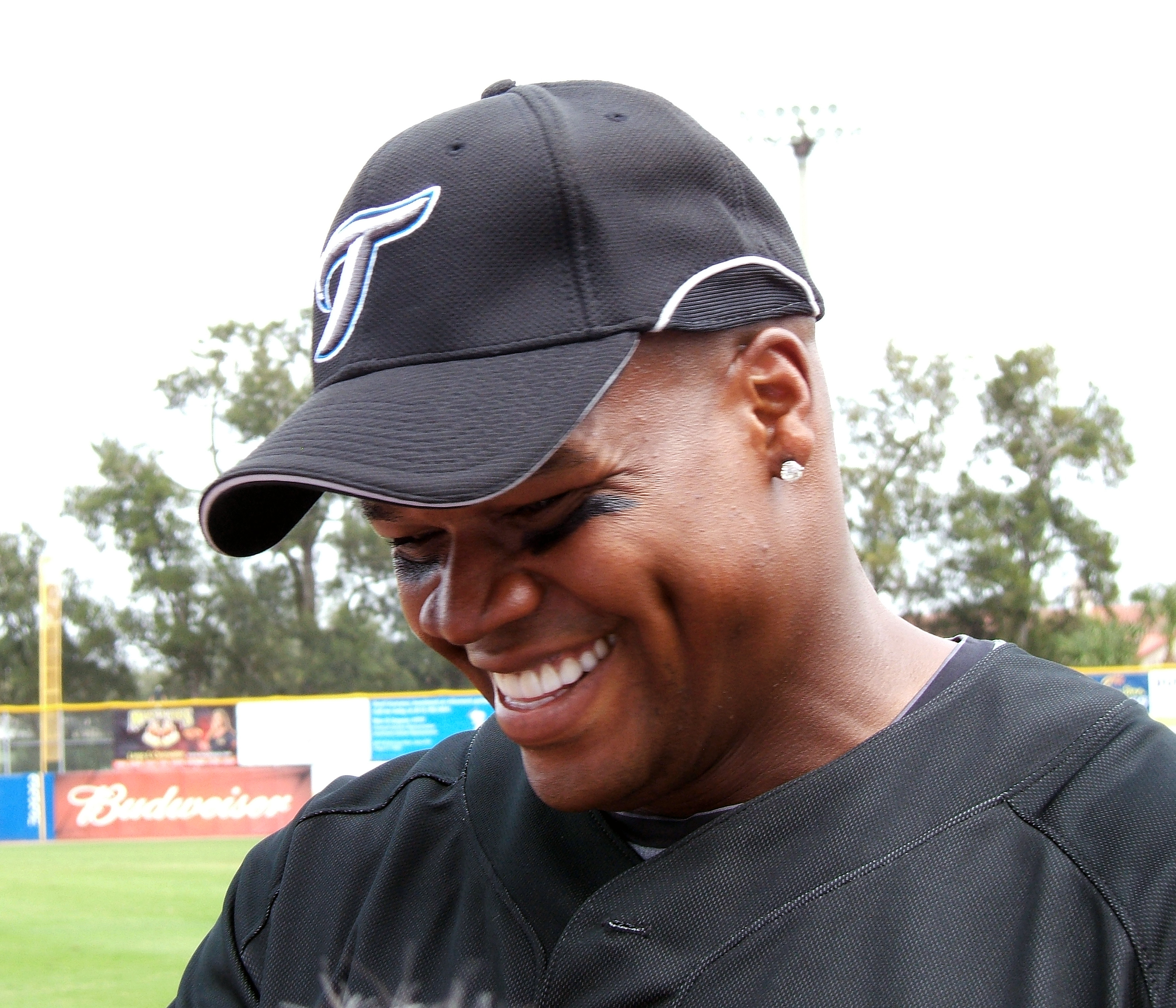
Thomas during spring training with Toronto in 2008

On November 16, 2006, Thomas signed a two-year, $18 million contract with the Toronto Blue Jays. According to MLB.com, Thomas was scheduled to make $9 million in each of the two seasons. The contract included an option for 2009 contingent on his reaching 1,050 plate appearances over the next two seasons or 525 plate appearances in the second year of the contract.

On June 17, 2007, Thomas hit his 496th career home run against the Washington Nationals, giving him his 244th home run as a DH, breaking the record previously held by Edgar Martínez.

On June 28, 2007, Thomas hit the 500th home run of his career, becoming the 21st major league player to do so. It was a three-run shot off Minnesota's Carlos Silva (Thomas' 500th home run came on the same day Craig Biggio hit his 3,000th career hit). Despite Thomas being a player for the visiting team in the game, the Metrodome scoreboard still paid notice to his achievement. He was later ejected from this same game.

On September 17, 2007, Thomas hit three home runs in his team's 6–1 win over the Red Sox. It was the second time in his career that Thomas hit three home runs in a game, the first time also having been against the Red Sox on September 15, 1996, in a White Sox loss. Knuckleballer Tim Wakefield started both games for the Red Sox, and gave up five of the six home runs Thomas hit, including all three in the first game.

During spring training in 2008, Thomas expressed his confidence about his team's chances for the upcoming season. Thomas hit his first home run of the season against the Red Sox on April 5, in a 10–2 Blue Jays win. The following day, with the bases loaded and a 2–2 tie, Thomas hit a grand slam off Red Sox reliever Manny Delcarmen, leading the Jays to a 7–4 victory. On April 19, before a game against the Detroit Tigers, manager John Gibbons benched Thomas. Thomas expressed his frustration about the decision, and vowed that his career would "not end like this". On April 20, 2008, the Blue Jays released Thomas.

=== Return to Oakland (2008) ===
Four days later after his release from Toronto, the Athletics and Thomas agreed to terms for his return. In his final game with the Athletics on August 29, he went 2-for-4. After playing 55 games with Oakland due to time on the disabled list, Thomas hit five more home runs to bring his career total to 521, while posting a .263 batting average. On October 31, 2008, he became a free agent.

=== Retirement with Chicago ===
Frank Thomas's number 35 was retired by the Chicago White Sox in 2010.

After not playing in the 2009 season, Thomas signed a one-day contract with the White Sox on February 12, 2010, and announced his retirement. During the same press conference, the White Sox, for whom he played the first 16 seasons of his career, announced that they would retire his No. 35 on August 29.

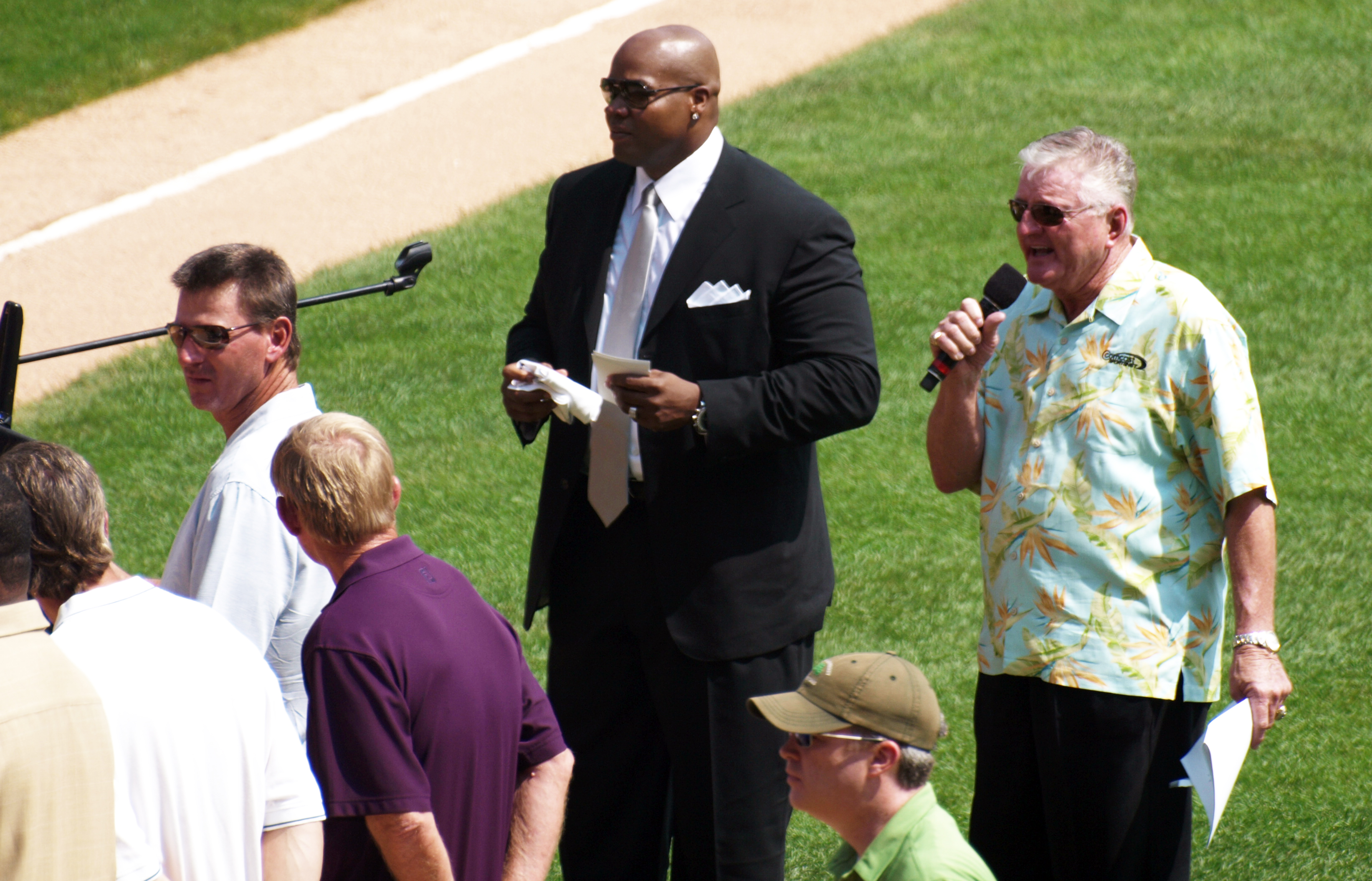
Frank Thomas Day at U.S. Cellular Field on August 29, 2010

Thomas is the only player in major league history to have seven consecutive seasons of a .300 average and at least 100 walks, 100 runs, 100 runs batted in, and 20 home runs (1991–1997). The only other player to have more than five consecutive seasons accomplishing this feat was Ted Williams, with six. This accomplishment is even more remarkable considering that Thomas played only 113 games in the strike-shortened 1994 season.

There are only six other players in history who have both hit more home runs and have a higher career batting average than Thomas: Ted Williams, Hank Aaron, Jimmie Foxx, Babe Ruth, Manny Ramirez, and Willie Mays.

== Stance against performance-enhancing drugs ==
Early in his career, Thomas, by his own admission, used greenies to deal with the difficulties of traveling. Thomas implied that he stopped using them after the collective bargaining agreement between the union and the league regulated teams' travel schedules.

However, as early as 1995, Thomas was advocating drug testing for professional baseball players. After hitting his 500th career home run in 2007, Thomas stated, "It means a lot to me because I did it the right way," alluding to Barry Bonds's then-ongoing pursuit of Hank Aaron's career home run record. Thomas was, then, the only active baseball player to be interviewed during the preparation of the Mitchell Report. He did so voluntarily.

Thomas has been critical of the election of certain players to the Hall of Fame who, he has said, "we all know" used performance-enhancing drugs (PEDs). Thomas said he was "not happy" about the 2017 election of Jeff Bagwell and Iván Rodríguez who, he said, "it's no secret" used PEDs.

In a 2018 interview with the Chicago Sun-Times, Thomas complained that his "career was stepped on" by competitors who used PEDs, saying that he "was the most hurt" of any players in that era.

== Playing accomplishments ==
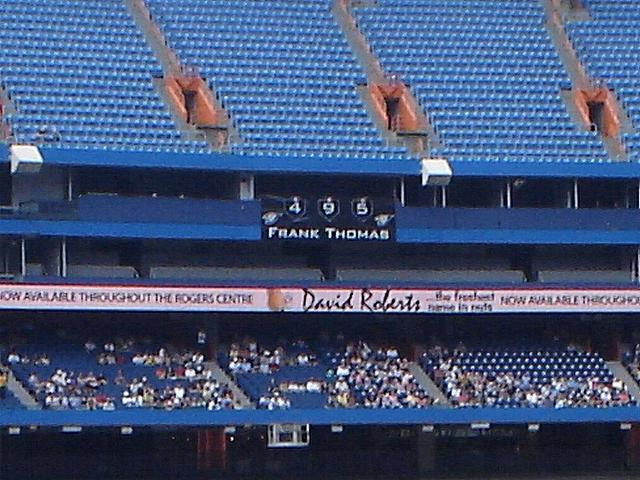
Banner at Rogers Centre displaying Thomas' home run count

- Five-time All-Star (1993–1997)
- Four-time Silver Slugger Award winner (1991, 1993–1994, 2000)
- On June 28, 2007, Thomas became the 21st player in major league history to hit at least 500 home runs, after he hit a first-inning home run at the Hubert H. Humphrey Metrodome.
- Thomas is on a short list of players who have hit 500 home runs while maintaining a career .300 batting average (joining Hall-of-Famers: Babe Ruth, Jimmie Foxx, Mel Ott, Ted Williams, Willie Mays, Hank Aaron, and later joined by Manny Ramírez and Miguel Cabrera).
- Thomas is one of six players to hit 500 career home runs and accrue at least 1,600 walks. The others are: Ruth, Ott, Mickey Mantle, Williams, and Barry Bonds.
- Thomas was the first player in major league history to win two Silver Slugger Awards each at two different positions (1993–94 at first base; 1991 and 2000 as designated hitter).
- He was only the 11th player in history to win consecutive Most Valuable Player Awards, and the first American League player to do so since Roger Maris in 1960 and 1961.
- He was the third player, following Aaron and Eddie Murray, to collect 500 career home runs and 120 career sacrifice flies. Albert Pujols later matched this feat.
- His 138 walks in the 1991 season was not only the most accrued in a season by any American League player in the 1990s, it was the most for a season by any AL player since 1969, when Harmon Killebrew walked 145 times.
- Thomas' .729 slugging average for the shortened 1994 season was the highest season mark for an AL player since Williams' .731 slugging average in 1957. Only Mark McGwire's .730 in 1996 has been higher since then.
- In the shortened 1994 season, Thomas achieved an on-base percentage of .494, which was also the highest season mark for an AL player since Williams' .528 on-base percentage in 1957. No AL player has topped this since.
- Retired as the all-time leader in home runs by a designated hitter (269); David Ortiz later broke his record.
- He is the only player in major league history to hit over 100 sacrifice flies and not collect a single sacrifice bunt, as well as the only player with over 10,000 plate appearances and no sacrifice bunts.
- The White Sox retired his uniform No. 35 during an on-field ceremony on "Frank Thomas Day", August 29, 2010.

== Retirement ==
=== Honors ===
The White Sox announced that they would honor Thomas with a life-size bronze statue. It was unveiled on July 31, 2011, on the outfield concourse at U.S. Cellular Field. It is the eighth statue on the outfield concourse.

Thomas was elected to the National Baseball Hall of Fame in 2014 with 83.7% of the vote in his initial year of eligibility, and was inducted as a member of the White Sox on July 27, 2014. He was the first player inducted into the Hall of Fame who played more games as a designated hitter than as a position player.

=== Appearances in the media ===
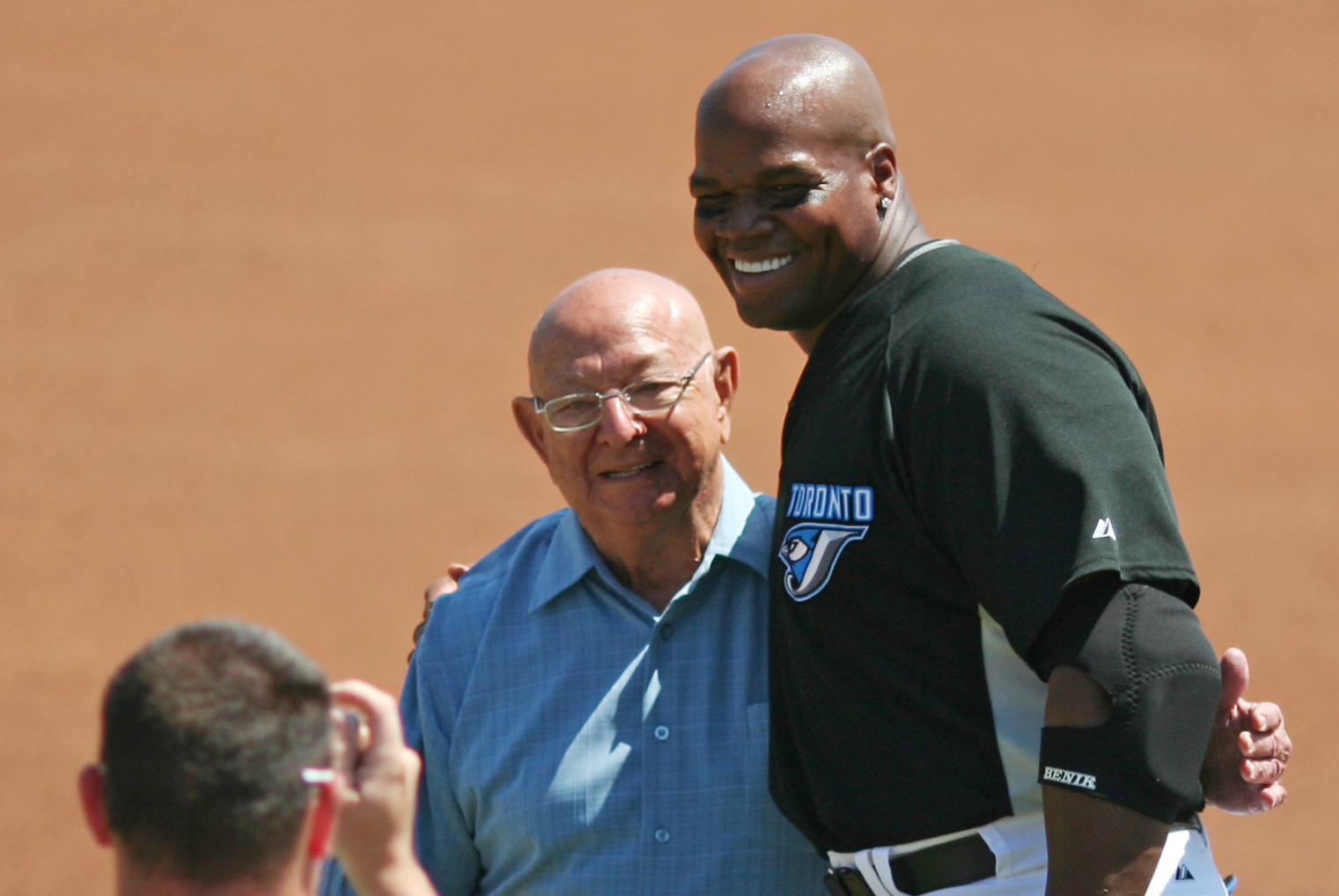
Thomas posing with Angelo Dundee, former trainer of Muhammad Ali, at Knology Field in Dunedin, Florida

Thomas appeared in the 1992 film Mr. Baseball as a hot-prospect rookie wearing #68 named Ricky Davis who forces Tom Selleck's character off the Yankees roster.

During the 1994–95 MLB strike, Thomas and a handful of other players appeared as themselves in the November 27, 1994, episode of Married... with Children (Season 9, Episode 11).

In 1995, a video game titled Frank Thomas Big Hurt Baseball was developed by Acclaim Entertainment and released for various platforms, with All-Star Baseball '97 Featuring Frank Thomas following in 1997. Also in 1995, Premier Technologies created a pinball machine (marketed under the Gottlieb trade name) titled Frank Thomas' Big Hurt; Thomas made an appearance in the documentary The History of Pinball in which he discusses the similarities between playing baseball and pinball. Frank Thomas' Big Hurt was later added to pinball video game The Pinball Arcade in late July 2016.

In 2007, he appeared in a promotional advertisement for the Blue Jays, in which he engages in a pillow fight with children. This ad drew the criticism of the Television Bureau of Canada, who requested a "Dramatization. Do not try this at home." disclaimer be placed on the ad. A similar warning was placed on teammate A. J. Burnett's commercial. In response, the Blue Jays scheduled a "Frank Thomas Kid's Pillow" promotion for September 2, 2007.

In 2012, Thomas participated in the Pepsi MAX Field of Dreams game in Columbus, Ohio. He batted cleanup and helped the Legends team win the ballgame. In 2013, he participated in the Pepsi MAX Field of Dreams game in Rochester, New York.

On June 24, 2017, Thomas gave a speech during Mark Buehrle's White Sox #56 retirement ceremony about Buehrle's career and his time being his teammate.

=== Broadcasting career ===
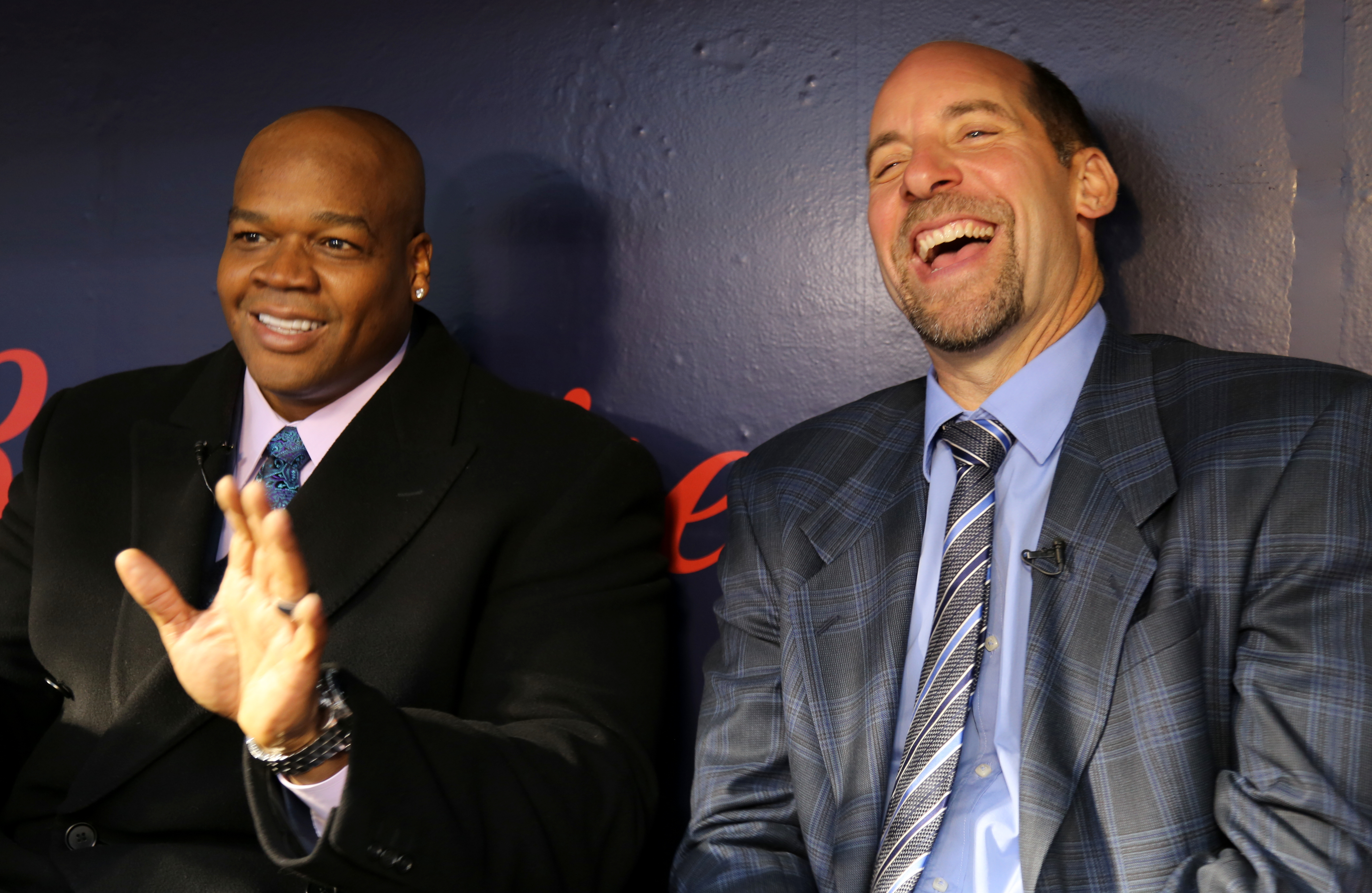
Frank Thomas with fellow MLB on Fox analyst and Hall of Famer John Smoltz before Game 4 of the 2015 World Series

Thomas appeared as a guest analyst during TBS's coverage of the 2007 MLB playoffs.

Since 2010, Thomas has occasionally appeared on NBC Sports Chicago as a studio analyst during their pre-game and post-game Chicago White Sox broadcasts as well as on other sports talk shows on the channel. He is also a substitute color analyst for the Chicago White Sox NBC Sports Chicago broadcasts and WGN broadcasts (until the channel ceased broadcasting the White Sox in 2020), filling in for Steve Stone on occasion.

In 2014, Thomas joined Fox Sports as a studio analyst for MLB on Fox. In April 2023, Fox Sports announced that Thomas was being replaced by Derek Jeter.

In June 2023, Thomas joined Apple TV+'s Friday Night Baseball coverage as an occasional interviewer and color commentator.

=== Business ===
Thomas is CEO and founder of W2W Records, a record label based in Las Vegas, Nevada. He also co-founded the record label Liger Enterprises with former Priority Records executive Ron Spaulding. The first project released under the company was Kenny Lattimore's 2017 album, Vulnerable.

Thomas started his own craft beer, Big Hurt Beer, in 2011.

In November 2014, Thomas opened a brewpub, Big Hurt Brewhouse, in the Chicago suburb of Berwyn, Illinois. The establishment closed in November 2016 but reopened the next year under the new name 35 Sports Bar and Grill. It closed for good in February 2018.

In 2018, Thomas was named spokesperson for Guaranteed Rate, a Chicago-based mortgage lender, who also owned the naming rights to the White Sox home stadium, Guaranteed Rate Field.

On September 30, 2021, Go The Distance Baseball announced in a press release that Thomas purchased a controlling interest in the company, which owned the Field of Dreams in Iowa.

Thomas has been a spokesman for testosterone supplement Nugenix since 2015.

== See also ==
- DHL Hometown Heroes
- List of Major League Baseball home run records
- 500 home run club
- List of Major League Baseball career home run leaders
- List of Major League Baseball career hits leaders
- List of Major League Baseball career doubles leaders
- List of Major League Baseball career runs scored leaders
- List of Major League Baseball career total bases leaders
- List of Major League Baseball runs batted in records
- List of Major League Baseball career runs batted in leaders
- List of Major League Baseball batting champions
- List of Major League Baseball annual runs scored leaders
- List of Major League Baseball annual doubles leaders

Preceded by Robin Ventura; Edgar Martínez; Rafael Palmeiro; Joe Carter; Albert Belle; Albert Belle; Alex Rodriguez; Ken Griffey Jr.	American League Player of the Month; August 1991; September 1992; August 1993; May 1994; July 1994; April 1996; September 1996; May 1997	Succeeded by Cal Ripken Jr. John Olerud; Chris Hoiles; Albert Belle; Manny Ramírez; Mo Vaughn; Ken Griffey Jr. Jeff King
