= MLB Dugout Heroes =

- Developer(s): Slugger Developers
- Publisher(s): GamesCampus
- Platform(s): Windows
- Genre(s): MMO, Baseball
- Mode(s): Multiplayer

MLB Dugout Heroes was a massive multiplayer online baseball game for the PC. The game is the first fully licensed and online-based PC baseball game in North America. The game is known as Slugger in South Korea, and is hosted by Pmang, a subsidiary of Neowiz Games. MLB Dugout Heroes had its servers shut down on February 29, 2012.

== History ==
GamesCampus signed a licensing deal with MLB Advanced Media in January 2009, so they have rights to present actual ballparks and real baseball players in the game, but this is restricted to Canada and USA only.

As of March 2010, the game includes all current teams in Major League Baseball. It also includes eight professional playing fields; Safeco Field (Seattle Mariners), Yankee Stadium (New York Yankees), AT&T Park (San Francisco Giants), Dodger Stadium (Los Angeles Dodgers), Fenway Park (Boston Red Sox), Wrigley Field (Chicago Cubs), Angel Stadium (Los Angeles Angels of Anaheim), Minute Maid Park (Houston Astros), Jamsil Stadium (Doosan Bears and LG Twins), and Tokyo Stadium (Yomiuri Giants). Additionally, it includes a field called "Practice Field" for batting and pitching practice.

== Selecting a team ==
Every team starts with a fairly even playing field in terms of skills and attributes. Some teams will be strong in one area, but weak in another. An example: The San Francisco Giants begin with the best pitching staff to start, however they have no power hitters. If you want a team with good hitters and a good pitching staff, you should pick the Milwaukee Brewers or the St. Louis Cardinals. The New York Yankees have great power hitters, but their speed is very low. The default team can not be changed once selected, so new players should choose a team they are fans of, and with which they will enjoy playing.

After a few seasons, though, the default team became irrelevant once better custom teams were created by each user.

== Gameplay ==
Games could be played for 3 innings, 5 innings, 7 innings, or 9 innings. Players could also choose which stadium to play, the time of day, allow people to watch, or turn extended innings on or off. Rookie players begin in the rookie server, only for players levels 1–5. The amateur server is for players level 6-19, and the Pro server is for players level 20 and above. There was also a separate Home Run Derby server, as well as a "Ladder" server for more competitive play. Pitchers would fatigue throughout the game based on how many pitches they throw, and how many runs they give up. Batters would also fatigue depending on age and would need to be rested or else their attributes and chances of an error would increase.

== Publishing ==
The game launched closed beta testing in March 2009 and soon after four weeks went into open beta. The publishers announced it went commercial in beginning of May 2009. The name "MLB Dugout Heroes" is trademarked, owned and copyrighted by Major League Baseball.

== Reception ==
Reception

Review scores
Publication	Score
GameZone	7.5/10
IGN	7.4/10

IGN gave MLB Dugout Heroes a 7.4 overall rating and called it a "well-built, fun and – perhaps most importantly for this sort of effort – accessible version of America's pastime." GameZone gave the game a 7.5 overall rating and wrote that the "players met in competition all seemed nice enough and the games ranged from extremely tactical, with base stealing and such, to blow-outs – both for and against this gamer."
