= MLB World Series 2009 =

2009 video game

- Developer: Polarbit
- Publisher: MLB Advanced Media
- Platform: iOS
- Release: April 10, 2009
- Genre: Sports
- Mode: Single-player

MLB World Series 2009 is a baseball simulation video game developed by American studio Polarbit and published by MLB Advanced Media for iOS. It was the first officially licensed Major League Baseball game for the platform.

== Gameplay ==
The game has 3 modes, World Series mode, Exhibition mode, and Season mode. In World Series mode, players simulate their own version of the 2009 Major League Baseball postseason. The game features 4 ballparks and 30 teams. The names of individual players are not included in this game.

== Release ==
MLB World Series 2009 was released in April 2009 on the Apple App Store for $7.99.
