= All-Star Baseball 2000 =

1999 video game

- Developers: Iguana Entertainment (N64); Realtime Associates (GBC)
- Publisher: Acclaim Entertainment (Note: Released under the Acclaim Sports label)
- Series: All-Star Baseball
- Platforms: Nintendo 64, Game Boy Color
- Release: Nintendo 64: NA: 7 April 1999; EU: 1 May 1999; Game Boy Color: NA: May 1999; EU: 1999
- Genre: Sports game
- Modes: Single-player, multiplayer

All-Star Baseball 2000 is a video game developed by Iguana Entertainment and Realtime Associates and published by Acclaim Entertainment for the Game Boy Color and the Nintendo 64 in 1999.

== Reception ==
Reception

Aggregate score
Aggregator	Score	
Aggregator	GBC	N64
GameRankings	60%	88%

Review scores
Publication	Score	
Publication	GBC	N64
AllGame	N/A	4.5/5
Electronic Gaming Monthly	N/A	8.875/10
Game Informer	7.25/10	8/10
GameFan	N/A	91%
GamePro	N/A	5/5
GameRevolution	N/A	A−
GameSpot	N/A	8.9/10
Hyper	N/A	92%
IGN	6/10	9/10
Next Generation	N/A	4/5
Nintendo Power	6.6/10	8/10

The Nintendo 64 version received favorable reviews, while the Game Boy Color version received mixed reviews, according to the review aggregation website GameRankings. The staff of Next Generation said in their July 1999 issue that just as they were about to give the former "a perfect rating", they noticed some gameplay bugs and AI glitches, but ultimately called it the best baseball game for Nintendo 64.
