= All-Star Baseball 2001 =

2000 video game by Acclaim Entertainment

- Developers: High Voltage Software (N64); KnowWonder (GBC)
- Publisher: Acclaim Entertainment (Note: Released under the Acclaim Sports label)
- Series: All-Star Baseball
- Platforms: Nintendo 64, Game Boy Color
- Release: Nintendo 64: NA: March 30, 2000; Game Boy Color: NA: June 1, 2000
- Genre: Sports game
- Modes: Single-player, multiplayer

All-Star Baseball 2001 is a video game developed by High Voltage Software and KnowWonder and published by Acclaim Entertainment for the Game Boy Color and the Nintendo 64 in 2000.

== Gameplay ==
The gameplay centers on the player controlling a Major League Baseball team through a simulation mode that allows management of statistics, trades, free agents, and overall team development, while standard games use a pitching and batting interface that emphasizes precision and timing; alternatively, the player can choose the Arcade Quickplay mode, which instead favors fast, simplified batting and pitching where the player swings and throws freely for quick, action‑focused matches.

== Reception ==
Reception

Aggregate score
Aggregator	Score	
Aggregator	GBC	N64
GameRankings	60%	87%

Review scores
Publication	Score	
Publication	GBC	N64
AllGame	N/A	4.5/5
Electronic Gaming Monthly	N/A	8.75/10
Game Informer	N/A	7.75/10
GameFan	N/A	91%
GamePro	N/A	5/5
GameSpot	7/10	9.2/10
IGN	6/10	9.1/10
N64 Magazine	N/A	81%
Nintendo Power	N/A	7.9/10

The Nintendo 64 version received favorable reviews, while the Game Boy Color version received mixed reviews, according to the review aggregation website GameRankings.
