= All-Star Baseball 2005 =

2004 video game

- Developer: Acclaim Studios Austin
- Publisher: Acclaim Entertainment
- Series: All-Star Baseball
- Platforms: Xbox, PlayStation 2
- Release: Xbox: NA: March 23, 2004; PlayStation 2: NA: April 8, 2004
- Genre: Sports game
- Modes: Single-player, multiplayer

All-Star Baseball 2005 is a baseball video game developed by Acclaim Studios Austin and published by Acclaim Entertainment for PlayStation 2 and Xbox in 2004. It was released exclusively in North America. The game features Derek Jeter on the cover. It is the eighth and last game in the series.

== Gameplay ==
=== Single-player ===
The game includes several features that most previous versions did not include, such as old players like Babe Ruth, Yogi Berra, and others. Apart from each of the Major League Baseball (MLB) teams, the game also features teams made up of legends from different eras.

Players can play an exhibition game against the computer, or a 162-game season, choosing their favorite team. Users can also create their own players and set their playing talent to one of five levels: rookie, veteran, all-star, legend, and hall-of-famer. The rookie level is recommended for beginners: when using the rookie level, hitting the ball becomes automatically easier (with a mechanism that the game calls "timing"). In addition, players can choose whether the fielding during a game will be done entirely by the player, by the computer, or as a combination, both by the player and the computer. The latter is called the "assist" fielding mode.

There are other modes of play. These are called the "Bonus play modes". The bonus play modes consist of a pick-up baseball game, a Baseball Weekly trivia game, a trivia game, batting practice, and a home run contest. The pick-up game in particular features four different fields where the player can stage games, these being a schoolyard, a sandlot, a city park, and a corn field. Major League players chosen by the computer "show up" for the pick-up games; the player has no control over who will show up. Typically, 16 contemporary players and two retired players (ex. Ty Cobb and Satchel Paige) show up for games. The player chooses the field and the number of innings that the pick-up games will be held for.

The trivia game offers an image of a board game. In the trivia game, two players play against each other. The computer picks up cards from a "stack of cards" placed on the board, in a somewhat similar way to the cards and the board used in Monopoly. Players must then correctly answer the question on each card. If the player is wrong, that represents one out. The player gets a "hit" for a correct answer, and the computer determines whether the hit was a single, double, triple, or home run. Every time a player gets a "hit" by answering a question correctly, the computer places a chess figure on the board, and the figure moves to the corresponding base, depending on what the computer determines. Before this game, players also choose the level of competition they want and how many "innings" the trivia game will be played for.

Barry Bonds does not appear in All-Star Baseball 2005 because he is not a member of the Professional Baseball Players Association. Instead, the San Francisco Giants have a make-believe player named "Wes Mailman". "Mailman" actually announces himself on one of the billboards at the Philadelphia Phillies home games. The game does feature play-by-play commentary by Arizona Diamondbacks television broadcaster Thom Brennaman and former major league player Steve Lyons, who sometimes offers long answers to Brennaman's questions during games.

All-Star Baseball 2005 features a variety of things that most previous versions (except 2004) did not include, such as classic players like Babe Ruth, Yogi Berra, and others. Apart from each of the MLB teams, the game also features MLB legends of different eras and the 2004 American and National League teams. One particular game characteristic is that it includes the Montreal Expos, who relocated from Montreal to Washington, D.C., and changed their name to the Washington Nationals for the 2005 MLB season.

The game includes all thirty stadiums as of the 2004 season, as well as other fictional and non-fictional ballparks to bring the total to over eighty parks. Some of these parks include: the Polo Grounds used by the then New York Giants (the New York Yankees played their home games there as well from 1913 to 1922); Ebbets Field used by the Brooklyn Dodgers from 1913 to 1957, Houston Astrodome; Hiram Bithorn Stadium used by the Montreal Expos in their final season; retro, current and future versions of Fenway Park, Yankee Stadium, Shea Stadium, and Dodger Stadium.

=== Multiplayer ===
All-Star Baseball 2005 supports split screen and was the first in the series to support online multiplayer, including online leaderboards. The game had the ability to download rosters via Xbox Live.

== Reception ==
Reception

Aggregate score
Aggregator	Score	
Aggregator	PS2	Xbox
Metacritic	72/100	75/100

Review scores
Publication	Score	
Publication	PS2	Xbox
Electronic Gaming Monthly	5.33/10	5.33/10
Game Informer	7/10	7/10
GamePro	N/A	4/5
GameSpot	7.5/10	8/10
GameSpy	N/A	3/5
GameZone	N/A	8.5/10
IGN	7.9/10	8/10
Official U.S. PlayStation Magazine	2.5/5	N/A
Official Xbox Magazine (US)	N/A	7.2/10
X-Play	N/A	3/5
Maxim	4/5	4/5

The Xbox version received "generally favorable reviews", while the PS2 version received "average" reviews, according to the review aggregation website Metacritic.
