= Iguana Entertainment =

American video game developer

- Logo as Iguana Entertainment
- Formerly: Iguana Entertainment (1991–1999); Acclaim Studios Austin (1999–2004)
- Type: Subsidiary
- Industry: Video games
- Founded: 1991 in Santa Clara, California, U.S.
- Founder: Jeff Spangenberg
- Defunct: August 27, 2004; 22 years ago
- Fate: Dissolved
- Headquarters: Austin, Texas, U.S.
- Parent: Acclaim Entertainment (1995–2004)

Iguana Entertainment, later known as Acclaim Studios Austin, was an American video game developer based in Austin, Texas. The company was founded in 1991 by Jeff Spangenberg, previously lead designer for Punk Development, and originally located in Santa Clara, California. Iguana found first success with Aero the Acro-Bat, moved to Austin and acquired Optimus Software (later Iguana UK) in 1993. Iguana was acquired by Acclaim Entertainment in January 1995 and received another sub-studio, Iguana West (formerly Sculptured Software) in October that year. Spangenberg was fired from his position in July 1998 and filed a lawsuit on breach of contract the following October. Iguana was rebranded Acclaim Studios Austin in May 1999, and the studio was closed down in August 2004, followed by the Chapter 7 bankruptcy of its parent in September 2004.

== History ==
Prior to founding Iguana Entertainment, Jeff Spangenberg, a self-taught programmer who skipped college to pursue a programming career, served as lead designer for Punk Development, the development team of publisher RazorSoft. In 1991, Spangenberg founded his own company in Santa Clara, California, and hired 20 staff, including friends of his. Initially, the company did not have a name; Jay Moon, who served as development support manager for the company, explained that Spangenberg held two pet iguanas, named Spike and Killer, wherefore the team settled on "Iguana Entertainment", with Spike and Killer serving as mascots for the company. In 1992, Several Punk Development employees joined Iguana when the partnership between Punk and RazorSoft dissolved, and Iguana hired further staff in 1993 through funding provided by publishers Sunsoft and Acclaim Entertainment.

Because of the high cost of living in the San Francisco Bay Area for Spangenberg and his employees, the company decided to move their headquarters. Their first choice was Seattle, Washington, which was also the location of Nintendo of America, but getting to know Texas' expanding technology industry, several Iguana staff traveled to Austin in May 1993 to investigate the relocation possibilities in the area. The team returned with videotape of the city's Sixth Street entertainment district. All but one employee agreed to move to Austin, and the relocation was completed shortly after. Later that year, Iguana achieved its first success with Aero the Acro-Bat and used profits generated from the game's sales to acquire Stockton-on-Tees-based developer Optimus Software, which was rebranded Iguana UK.

On December 21, 1994, Acclaim announced that it had agreed to acquire Iguana. The deal was completed on January 4, 1995, with US$5 million paid in cash and additional, undisclosed payments made in stock. In October 1995, Acclaim additionally acquired Salt Lake City-based Sculptured Software for $30 million in stock, which became part of Iguana under the name Iguana West in December 1997.

Spangenberg was fired from Iguana on July 8, 1998, and several undisclosed management changes at the studio were announced by Acclaim later the same month. Additionally, the company was placed under Acclaim Studios, a new, decentralized management for Acclaim's development studios led by former Iguana employee Darrin Stubbington. In October that year, Spangenberg filed a lawsuit against Acclaim, Acclaim co-founder Greg Fischbach, and Iguana for breach of contract and fraud. The suit, handled as "Jeffery Spangenberg vs. Acclaim Entertainment, Inc., Iguana Entertainment, Inc., and Gregory Fischbach", alleged that Fischbach urged Spangenberg to purchase Acclaim shares worth $25,000 in February 1998, and convinced him to keep them just shortly before Spangenberg was relieved of his position, resulting in his loss of stock options. Spangenberg founded a new development company, Retro Studios, on October 1, 1999.

In May 1999, Acclaim Studios announced that it would unify all development studios owned by the company under the same branding; as part of this move, Iguana, Iguana UK and Iguana West became Acclaim Studios Austin, Acclaim Studios Teesside and Acclaim Studios Salt Lake City, respectively. When Acclaim's agreement with GMAC Commercial Finance, its primary lender, expired on August 20, 2004, the company closed all of its facilities, including Acclaim Studios Austin, on August 27, of which the Austin and New York studios saw all employees let go. Acclaim itself filed for Chapter 7 bankruptcy with the United States bankruptcy court in Central Islip, New York on September 1.

The "Iguana Entertainment" name was reused by brothers Jason and Darren Falcus, who had founded Optimus Software in February 1988, when they created a studio of the same name in 2009. That studio was acquired by and incorporated into Team17 in December 2011.

== Games ==
As Iguana Entertainment
| Year | Title | Platform(s) |
|---|---|---|
| 1992 | Super High Impact | Sega Genesis |
| 1993 | Aero the Acro-Bat | Sega Genesis, Super Nintendo Entertainment System |
| 1994 | Zero the Kamikaze Squirrel | Sega Genesis, Super Nintendo Entertainment System |
| 1994 | Aero the Acro-Bat 2 | Sega Genesis, Super Nintendo Entertainment System |
| 1994 | The Pirates of Dark Water | Sega Genesis |
| 1994 | NBA Jam | Sega CD, Sega Genesis, Super Nintendo Entertainment System |
| 1994 | NFL Quarterback Club | Sega Genesis, Super Nintendo Entertainment System |
| 1994 | Side Pocket | Super Nintendo Entertainment System |
| 1995 | Might and Magic III: Isles of Terra | Super Nintendo Entertainment System |
| 1995 | NBA Jam Tournament Edition | Sega Genesis, Super Nintendo Entertainment System |
| 1995 | Frank Thomas Big Hurt Baseball | Sega Genesis, Super Nintendo Entertainment System |
| 1995 | NFL Quarterback Club 96 | Microsoft Windows, Sega Genesis, Sega Saturn, Super Nintendo Entertainment System |
| 1996 | NFL Quarterback Club 97 | PlayStation, Sega Saturn |
| 1996 | Batman Forever: The Arcade Game | PlayStation, Sega Saturn |
| 1997 | All-Star Baseball '97 featuring Frank Thomas | PlayStation, Sega Saturn |
| 1997 | Turok: Dinosaur Hunter | Microsoft Windows, Nintendo 64 |
| 1997 | NFL Quarterback Club 98 | Nintendo 64 |
| 1998 | NHL Breakaway 98 | Nintendo 64 |
| 1998 | All-Star Baseball 99 | Nintendo 64 |
| 1998 | Iggy's Reckin' Balls | Nintendo 64 |
| 1998 | NFL Quarterback Club 99 | Nintendo 64 |
| 1998 | NHL Breakaway 99 | Nintendo 64 |
| 1998 | NBA Jam 99 | Nintendo 64 |
| 1998 | South Park | Microsoft Windows, Nintendo 64, PlayStation |
| 1998 | Turok 2: Seeds of Evil | Microsoft Windows, Nintendo 64 |
| 1999 | All-Star Baseball 2000 | Nintendo 64 |

As Acclaim Studios Austin
| Year | Title | Platform(s) |
|---|---|---|
| 1999 | South Park: Chef's Luv Shack | Dreamcast, Microsoft Windows, Nintendo 64, PlayStation |
| 1999 | Turok: Rage Wars | Nintendo 64 |
| 1999 | NFL Quarterback Club 2000 | Nintendo 64, Dreamcast |
| 2000 | Turok 3: Shadow of Oblivion | Nintendo 64 |
| 2001 | All-Star Baseball 2002 | GameCube, PlayStation 2 |
| 2001 | NFL QB Club 2002 | GameCube, PlayStation 2 |
| 2002 | All-Star Baseball 2003 | GameCube, PlayStation 2, Xbox |
| 2002 | Turok: Evolution | GameCube, Microsoft Windows, PlayStation 2, Xbox |
| 2003 | Vexx | GameCube, PlayStation 2, Xbox |
| 2003 | All-Star Baseball 2004 | GameCube, PlayStation 2, Xbox |
| 2003 | NBA Jam | PlayStation 2, Xbox |
| 2004 | All-Star Baseball 2005 | PlayStation 2, Xbox |
| 2004 | Showdown: Legends of Wrestling | PlayStation 2, Xbox |
| 2007 | The Red Star | PlayStation 2 |
| Canceled | 100 Bullets | PlayStation 2, Xbox |
