= All-Star Baseball 2002 =

2001 video game

- PlayStation 2 cover art
- Developer: Acclaim Studios Austin
- Publisher: Acclaim Entertainment (Note: Released under the Acclaim Sports label)
- Series: All-Star Baseball
- Platforms: PlayStation 2, GameCube
- Release: PlayStation 2: NA: March 16, 2001; EU: May 25, 2001; JP: October 4, 2001; GameCube: NA: November 18, 2001
- Genre: Sports
- Modes: Single-player, multiplayer

All-Star Baseball 2002 is a baseball sports game released for PlayStation 2 and GameCube in 2001. Derek Jeter is on the cover.

== Reception ==
Reception

Aggregate score
Aggregator	Score	
Aggregator	GameCube	PS2
Metacritic	66/100	77/100

Review scores
Publication	Score	
Publication	GameCube	PS2
AllGame	2.5/5	4/5
Electronic Gaming Monthly	6.33/10 (Note: In Electronic Gaming Monthly's review of the GameCube version, one critic gave it 5/10, and the rest gave it each a score of 7/10.)	5.67/10 (Note: Two critics of Electronic Gaming Monthly gave the PlayStation 2 version each a score of 6.5/10, and the other gave it 4/10.)
EP Daily	6/10	8/10
Famitsu	N/A	24/40
Game Informer	5.75/10	8/10
GameRevolution	C−	N/A
GameSpot	6.5/10	8.3/10
GameSpy	80%	80%
GameZone	7.8/10	N/A
IGN	6.8/10	8.4/10
Nintendo Power	2.8/5	N/A
Nintendo World Report	4.5/10	N/A
Official U.S. PlayStation Magazine	N/A	3.5/5
X-Play	N/A	4/5

The PlayStation 2 version received "generally favorable reviews", while the GameCube version received "average" reviews, according to the review aggregation website Metacritic. In Japan, Famitsu gave it a score of 24 out of 40 for PlayStation 2 version. GamePro said of the same console version, "If you like cursor-style controls and pretty graphics, avoid an error by snagging All-Star Baseball 2002. Otherwise, you may have more fun with High Heat." (Note: GamePro gave the PlayStation 2 version 5/5 for graphics, two 4.5/5 scores for sound and fun factor, and 4/5 for control.) Nintendo World Report criticized the large amount of data required for game saves on the GameCube version, noting that size requirements were so large that it was impossible to concurrently have saves for a separate season and series on one memory card at the same time, and impossible to utilize a second memory card.
