= All-Star Baseball '97 featuring Frank Thomas =

1997 video game

All-Star Baseball '97
- PlayStation cover art
- Developer: Iguana Entertainment
- Publisher: Acclaim Entertainment
- Series: All-Star Baseball
- Platforms: PlayStation, Sega Saturn
- Release: PlayStation: NA: May 14, 1997; Saturn: NA: May 29, 1997
- Genre: Sports (baseball)
- Modes: Single-player, multiplayer

All-Star Baseball '97 featuring Frank Thomas, sometimes mislabeled as All Star Baseball '98, is a 1997 baseball video game developed by Iguana Entertainment and published by Acclaim Entertainment for the PlayStation and Sega Saturn. It is the successor to Frank Thomas Big Hurt Baseball and the first game in the All-Star Baseball series.

== Reception ==
Reception

Review scores
Publication	Score
AllGame	1.5/5
Electronic Gaming Monthly	5.75/10 (Note: Two critics of Electronic Gaming Monthly gave the PlayStation version each a score of 5.5/10 and 6/10.)
Game Informer	5.5/10
GameFan	89%
GameSpot	6.5/10
IGN	5/10
Next Generation	2/5
San Francisco Examiner	B−

Electronic Gaming Monthly's Kraig Kujawa said that the PlayStation version still plays the same as Frank Thomas Big Hurt Baseball, and called the title "mediocre". Next Generation similarly commented that All-Star Baseball '97 is not groundbreaking title in gameplay and graphics, but considered it decent. GamePro's The Rookie was more critical to the graphics, controls and bad camera. While the Saturn version was largely ignored by reviewers, The Rookie found it more enjoyable than the PlayStation version, citing better control, though he still advised gamers to hold out for World Series Baseball '98 instead. He scored it higher than the PlayStation version in control and fun factor, and equal in graphics and sound. (Note: GamePro gave the PlayStation version two 2.5/5 scores for graphics and control, 4/5 for sound, and 1.5/5 for overall fun factor.) (Note: GamePro gave the Saturn version 2.5/5 for graphics, 4/5 for sound, and two 3/5 scores for control and overall fun factor.)
