= Frank Thomas Big Hurt Baseball =

1995 baseball video game

- Developers: Iguana Entertainment; Realtime Associates Seattle (GB, GG); Iguana UK (DOS, PS, Saturn)
- Publisher: Acclaim Entertainment
- Designer: Brett Gow
- Composers: Greg Turner; Eric Swanson; Darren Mitchell (SNES)
- Platforms: Genesis; Game Gear; Super Nintendo; Game Boy; Saturn; PlayStation; MS-DOS
- Release: October 1995: Genesis; NA: October 1995; EU: 1995 Game Gear; NA: October 1995 Super NES; NA: November 1995; EU: 1995 Game Boy; NA: December 1995; EU: 1996 PC; NA: June 1996 PlayStation; NA: June 5, 1996; EU: October 1996 Saturn; NA: June 7, 1996; EU: June 1996
- Genre: Traditional baseball simulation
- Modes: Single-player, multiplayer

Frank Thomas Big Hurt Baseball is a multiplatform baseball simulation game that was licensed by the Major League Baseball Players Association, featuring the likeness, motion captured movements, and "Big Hurt" branding of player Frank Thomas.

All the teams, statistics, and players are meant to simulate the 1995 Major League Baseball season. Acclaim released a successor to the game also featuring Thomas and actual major league teams, All-Star Baseball '97 featuring Frank Thomas.

== Gameplay ==
In this screenshot, the batter sends the ball flying far away. On the scoreboard, there is also an endorsement for the athletic shoe company Reebok.

The game includes regular season and exhibition modes. It was noted for featuring realistic pitching and batting for its era, as well as a realistic likeness of Frank Thomas himself.

Pitching and batting can be done either in a high, medium, or low direction (in addition to slow, medium, or fast pitching) for greater realism. Particular emphasis was placed on defense and pitching, as opposed to more offense-oriented baseball video games like World Series Baseball '95. Games often take place at night, especially at Wrigley Field.

Games can be played to a minimum of two innings and a maximum of nine innings (plus any extra innings that occur in a tied game). All the teams in the game can be edited through a special edit screen; this allows players to replace teams that they do not like with their home towns that do not have Major League Baseball teams.

More than 700 players with Major League Baseball contracts appeared in the game.

== Development ==
Frank Thomas's animations in the game were created from several days of motion capture filming Thomas at Acclaim's in-house studio during Spring 1995.

== Ports ==
A conversion of the game was in development for the Atari Jaguar CD after Atari Corporation and Acclaim announced their partnership in March 1995 that included plans to release three titles for the system, including Frank Thomas Big Hurt Baseball. The port was originally slated to be released around the fourth quarter of 1995 and was later slated for an April/Q2 1996 release, but work on the port was discontinued sometime in 1995 and was never released.

== Reception ==
Reception

Aggregate score
Aggregator	Score
GameRankings	68% (PS1)

Review scores
Publication	Score
AllGame	2.5/5 (GEN); 2.5/5 (SAT)
Electronic Gaming Monthly	7.5/10 (PS1)
GameSpot	6/10 (PC)
Next Generation	2/5 (SNES); 3/5 (SAT)
Nintendo Power	13.2/20
Official Nintendo Magazine	83/100 (GB)
Super Play	68%
Total!	80/100
Sega Saturn Magazine	58% (SAT)

Reviewing the Genesis version, GamePro said the game has "nothing awful", but is also short on exceptional features. The reviewer praised the animation but criticized the slow-moving fielders, inauthentic representations of real world ballparks, "jagged" voice tracks, and graphical glitches. A different GamePro critic reviewed the Super NES version and was more negative: "Watching Little League players would be more exciting than struggling with Big Hurt's shoddy controls, scant features, and no-brainer action." He also criticized how tightly the camera follows the ball during fielding. Next Generation's brief review of the Super NES version stated, "Combing simulation aspects with a traditional baseball game, Frank Thomas' Big Hurt Baseball shows signs of innovative but flawed thinking. Most of the simulation aspects are in the pitching, which quickly becomes a tiresome chore. The rest of the game is a sub-par replica of several other baseball titles."

The two sports reviewers of Electronic Gaming Monthly both gave the PlayStation version a 7.5 out of 10. They remarked that the attention to detail in the stadium sounds and visuals make the game very realistic, and that while the control is somewhat "sluggish", it works well once learned. GamePro said that the motion-captured animation is excellent, but that against other PlayStation baseball games such as Triple Play 97, Frank Thomas Big Hurt Baseball does not hold up well due to the lack of key options such as changing the batter's stance and speed bursts while running. The same GamePro reviewer gave a more positive recommendation for the Saturn version, while noting that he only did so because the Saturn did not have as many outstanding baseball games as the PlayStation yet. Both GamePro and Next Generation found the Saturn version a major improvement over the Super NES version, with Next Generation calling it "an extremely solid game with little flaws that keep it from being great". The reviewer called the graphics "extraordinary", while his criticisms included the somewhat difficult interface and the delay in the batting controls. Rob Allsetter of the British Sega Saturn Magazine chiefly commented on baseball's lack of mass appeal in Britain, and argued that though Big Hurt is good by the standards of a baseball video game it would only appeal to those who are fans of the sport.

GamePro gave the Game Boy version a brief negative review, commenting that "The graphics make hitting a nightmare. When the ball is on its way, it gets lost in the green background. Every swing of the bat sounds like a skier slushing down the slopes." They were much more approving of the Game Gear version, saying it "offer smooth gameplay and excellent control along with such options as Season and All Star games."

== Legacy ==
In October 2018, the game's rights were acquired by Canadian production company Liquid Media Group along with other titles originally owned by Acclaim Entertainment.

== See also ==
- Frank Thomas' Big Hurt, a pinball game
