= All-Star Baseball 99 =

1998 video game

- Developer: Iguana Entertainment (N64); Realtime Associates Seattle Division (GB)
- Publisher: Acclaim Entertainment (Note: Released under the Acclaim Sports label)
- Series: All-Star Baseball
- Platforms: Game Boy, Nintendo 64
- Release: NA: 27 May 1998; EU: 1 August 1998 (N64)
- Genre: Sports game
- Modes: Single-player, multiplayer

All-Star Baseball 99 is a video game developed by Iguana Entertainment and Realtime Associates Seattle Division and published by Acclaim Entertainment for the Game Boy and the Nintendo 64 in 1998. The game's cover features Colorado Rockies outfielder Larry Walker.

All-Star Baseball 99 was the first game to use Acclaim's Quagmire engine. The game also marked the debut of play-by-play commentary for the series. This is done by two New York Yankees broadcasters: John Sterling and Michael Kay.

== Gameplay ==
The game contains exhibition, playoff, home run derby, and season modes. A "create-a-player" feature for customized ball players is included. The Nintendo 64 version supports the Rumble Pak.

== Reception ==
Reception

Aggregate score
| Aggregator | Score | |
| Aggregator | Game Boy | N64 |
|---|---|---|
| GameRankings | 69% | 86% |

Review scores
| Publication | Score | |
| Publication | Game Boy | N64 |
|---|---|---|
| CNET Gamecenter | N/A | 9/10 |
| Electronic Gaming Monthly | N/A | 8.125/10 (Note: Three critics of Electronic Gaming Monthly gave the Nintendo 64 version each a score of 8/10, and the other gave it 8.5/10.) |
| EP Daily | N/A | 8.5/10 |
| Game Informer | 7/10 | 8.5/10 |
| GameFan | N/A | 94% (Note: In GameFan's viewpoint of the Nintendo 64 version, one critic gave it 95, and the other 92.) |
| GameRevolution | N/A | B+ |
| GameSpot | N/A | 8.3/10 |
| Hyper | N/A | 91% |
| IGN | N/A | 8.2/10 |
| N64 Magazine | N/A | 84% |
| Next Generation | N/A | 4/5 |
| Nintendo Power | 6.9/10 | 8.1/10 |

The Nintendo 64 version received favorable reviews, while the Game Boy version received average reviews, according to the review aggregation website GameRankings. Next Generation called the former the best baseball game for Nintendo 64 despite noting minor AI problems and a slower pace. GamePro said that the same console version "is this season's sports phenom, delivering stylish looks and clutch, long-ball gameplay. As of today, it's the best baseball game of the year and a must-buy for all sports nuts." (Note: GamePro gave the Nintendo 64 version two 5/5 scores for graphics and fun factor, and two 4.5/5 scores for sound and control.)
