= List of Nintendo 64 games =

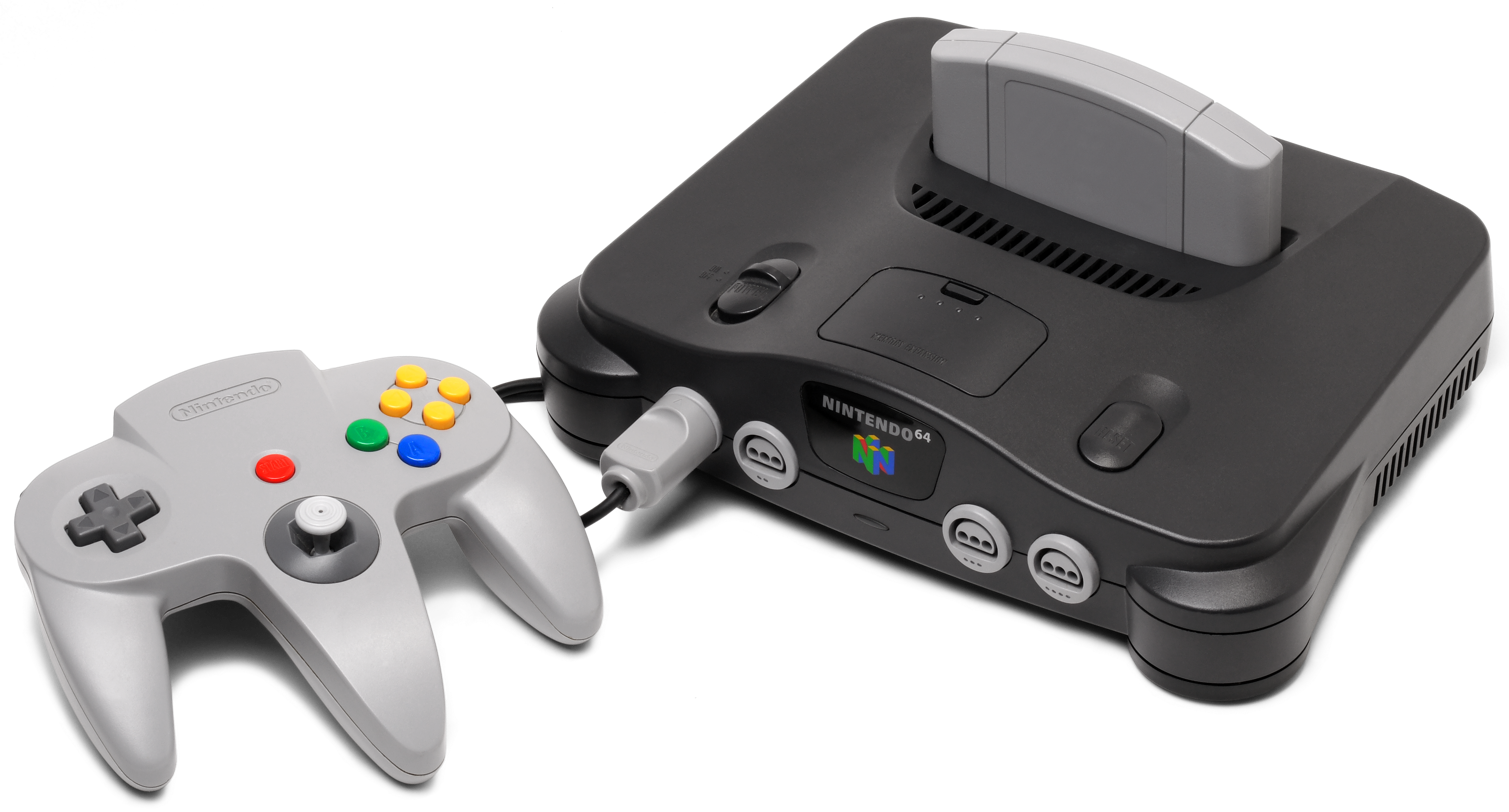
The Nintendo 64

Nintendo 64 Game Paks. Super Mario 64, the reverse of a North American, a PAL region, and a Japanese region game with identical tabs near its bottom edge.

The Nintendo 64 home video game console's library of games were primarily released in a plastic ROM cartridge called the Game Pak. This strategic choice of high-performance but lower-capacity medium was met with some controversy compared to CD-ROM. Two small indentations on the back of each cartridge allow it to connect or pass through the system's cartridge dustcover flaps. All regions have the same connectors, and region-locked cartridges will fit into the other regions' systems by using a cartridge converter or by simply removing the cartridge's casing. However, the systems are also equipped with lockout chips that will only allow them to play their appropriate games. Both Japanese and North American systems have the same NTSC lockout, and Europe has a PAL lockout. A bypass device such as the N64 Passport or the Datel Action Replay can be used to play import games, but a few require an additional boot code.

The Nintendo 64 was first launched in Japan on June 23, 1996, with Super Mario 64, Pilotwings 64, and Saikyō Habu Shōgi; in North America with Super Mario 64 and Pilotwings 64; and in Europe with Super Mario 64, Pilotwings 64, Star Wars: Shadows of the Empire, and Wayne Gretzky's 3D Hockey. The final first-party games are Dōbutsu no Mori on April 14, 2001, in Japan, and Mario Party 3 on May 7, 2001, in North America. The final licensed game to be published for the system is the North American exclusive Tony Hawk's Pro Skater 3 on August 20, 2002. The best-selling game is Super Mario 64 with 11 million units as of May 21, 2003. The total unit sales of Nintendo 64 software has exceeded the total unit sales of GameCube software, but it has the lowest software sales per console sold among all Nintendo consoles.

There are 388 games listed below. This list is initially organized by either the game's English language title, or the Hepburn romanization of Japan-only releases. All English titles are listed first, followed by alternate titles, and there are no unofficial translations. Games for the 64DD peripheral and the Aleck 64 arcade system are not included in this list. For games that were announced or in development for the Nintendo 64, but never released, see the list of cancelled Nintendo 64 games.

== Games ==
Region code guide
Region	Description
Japan	Japanese (NTSC-J) formatted release.
North America	North America and other NTSC territories, besides Japan.
PAL	PAL formatted release. Territories include much of Europe, Australia, and New Zealand.

List of Nintendo 64 games
Title	Developer(s)	Publisher(s)	First released	Release date		
Title	Developer(s)	Publisher(s)	First released	Japan	North America	PAL
64 de Hakken!! Tamagotchi: Minna de Tamagotchi World	Hudson Soft	Bandai	1997-12-19^{JP}	December 19, 1997	Unreleased	Unreleased
64 Hanafuda: Tenshi no Yakusoku	Altron	Altron	1999-11-05^{JP}	November 5, 1999	Unreleased	Unreleased
64 Ōzumō	Bottom Up	Bottom Up	1997-11-28^{JP}	November 28, 1997	Unreleased	Unreleased
64 Ōzumō 2	Bottom Up	Bottom Up	1999-03-19^{JP}	March 19, 1999	Unreleased	Unreleased
64 Trump Collection: Alice no Waku Waku Trump World	Bottom Up	Bottom Up	1998-08-07^{JP}	August 7, 1998	Unreleased	Unreleased
1080° Snowboarding	Nintendo EAD	Nintendo	1998-02-28^{JP}	February 28, 1998	April 1, 1998	October 9, 1998
Aero Fighters Assault	Paradigm Entertainment	Video System	1997-11-21^{NA}	March 19, 1998	November 21, 1997	April 12, 1998
AeroGauge	Locomotive Corporation	ASCII Entertainment	1997-12-19^{JP}	December 19, 1997	May 21, 1998	March 1998
AI Shogi 3	i4 Corporation	ASCII Entertainment	1998-12-18^{JP}	December 18, 1998	Unreleased	Unreleased
Aidyn Chronicles: The First Mage	H2O Entertainment	THQ	2001-03-20^{NA}	Unreleased	March 20, 2001	August 3, 2001
Air Boarder 64	Human Entertainment	Human Entertainment^{JP} Gaga Interactive Media^{PAL}	1998-03-27^{JP}	March 27, 1998	Unreleased	November 1998
All-Star Baseball 99	Iguana Entertainment	Acclaim Sports	1998-05-27^{NA}	Unreleased	May 27, 1998	August 1, 1998
All-Star Baseball 2000	Iguana Entertainment	Acclaim Sports	1999-04-07^{NA}	Unreleased	April 7, 1999	May 1, 1999
All-Star Baseball 2001	High Voltage Software	Acclaim Sports	2000-03-31^{NA}	Unreleased	March 31, 2000	Unreleased
All Star Tennis '99; Yannick Noah All Star Tennis '99^{FRA}	Smart Dog	Ubi Soft	1999-01^{PAL}	Unreleased	August 31, 1999	January 1999
Armorines: Project S.W.A.R.M. Armorines^{PAL}	Acclaim Studios London	Acclaim Entertainment	1999-12-09^{NA}	Unreleased	December 9, 1999	December 17, 1999
Army Men: Air Combat	The 3DO Company	The 3DO Company	2000-07-18^{NA}	Unreleased	July 18, 2000	Unreleased
Army Men: Sarge's Heroes	The 3DO Company	The 3DO Company	1999-09-28^{NA}	Unreleased	September 28, 1999	April 14, 2000
Army Men: Sarge's Heroes 2	The 3DO Company	The 3DO Company	2000-09-27^{NA}	Unreleased	September 27, 2000	Unreleased
Asteroids Hyper 64	Syrox Developments	Crave Entertainment	1999-12-14^{NA}	Unreleased	December 14, 1999	Unreleased
Automobili Lamborghini; Super Speed Race 64^{JP}	Titus France	Titus Interactive^{WW} Taito^{JP}	1997-11-22^{NA}	May 28, 1998	November 22, 1997	December 1, 1997
Bakuretsu Muteki Bangaiō	Treasure	ESP	1999-09-03^{JP}	September 3, 1999	Unreleased	Unreleased
Bakushō Jinsei 64: Mezase! Resort Ō	Taito	Taito	1998-12-24^{JP}	December 24, 1998	Unreleased	Unreleased
Banjo-Kazooie	Rare	Nintendo	1998-06-29^{NA}	December 6, 1998	June 29, 1998	July 17, 1998^{EU} August 1998^{AUS}
Banjo-Tooie	Rare	Nintendo	2000-11-20^{NA}	November 27, 2000	November 20, 2000	April 12, 2001
Bass Masters 2000	Mass Media	THQ	1999-12-16^{NA}	Unreleased	December 16, 1999	Unreleased
Bass Rush: ECOGEAR PowerWorm Championship	Visco Corporation	Visco Corporation	2000-04-28^{JP}	April 28, 2000	Unreleased	Unreleased
Batman Beyond: Return of the Joker^{NA} Batman of the Future: Return of the Joker^{PAL}	Kemco	Ubi Soft	2000-12-13^{NA}	Unreleased	December 13, 2000	December 15, 2000
BattleTanx	The 3DO Company	The 3DO Company	1998-12-29^{NA}	Unreleased	December 29, 1998	Unreleased
BattleTanx: Global Assault	The 3DO Company	The 3DO Company	1999-10-12^{NA}	Unreleased	October 12, 1999	April 2000
Battlezone: Rise of the Black Dogs	Climax Development	Crave Entertainment	2000-04-14^{NA}	Unreleased	April 14, 2000	Unreleased
Beetle Adventure Racing! HSV Adventure Racing^{AUS}	Paradigm Entertainment; EA Canada	Electronic Arts^{WW} Square EA^{JP}	1999-03-23^{NA}	November 26, 1999	March 23, 1999	September 4, 1999
Big Mountain 2000	Imagineer	Imagineer^{JP} SouthPeak Interactive^{NA}	1998-12-26^{JP}	December 26, 1998	October 10, 2000	Unreleased
Bio F.R.E.A.K.S.	Midway Studios San Diego; Saffire	Midway^{NA} GT Interactive^{PAL}	1998-05-19^{NA}	Unreleased	May 19, 1998	September 1998
Blast Corps	Rare	Nintendo	1997-03-21^{JP}	March 21, 1997	March 24, 1997	December 22, 1997
Blues Brothers 2000	Player 1	Titus Interactive	2000-10-13^{PAL}	Unreleased	November 17, 2000	October 13, 2000
Body Harvest	DMA Design	Midway^{NA} Gremlin Interactive^{PAL}	1998-10-20^{NA}	Unreleased	October 20, 1998	November 13, 1998
Bomberman 64; Baku Bomberman^{JP}	Hudson Soft	Hudson Soft^{JP} Nintendo^{WW}	1997-09-26^{JP}	September 26, 1997	December 3, 1997	November 21, 1997
Bomberman 64: The Second Attack! Baku Bomberman 2^{JP}	Hudson Soft	Hudson Soft^{JP} Vatical Entertainment^{NA}	1999-12-03^{JP}	December 3, 1999	May 29, 2000	Unreleased
Bomberman Hero	A.I	Hudson Soft^{JP} Nintendo^{WW}	1998-04-30^{JP}	April 30, 1998	August 31, 1998	October 23, 1998
Bomberman 64	Racjin	Hudson Soft	2001-12-20^{JP}	December 20, 2001	Unreleased	Unreleased
Bottom of the 9th	Konami Computer Entertainment Chicago	Konami	1999-04-14^{NA}	Unreleased	April 14, 1999	Unreleased
Brunswick Circuit Pro Bowling	Point of View	THQ	1999-12-22^{NA}	Unreleased	December 22, 1999	Unreleased
Buck Bumble	Argonaut Software	Ubi Soft	1998-11-20^{NA}	December 18, 1998	November 20, 1998	December 4, 1998
A Bug's Life	Traveller's Tales	Activision	1999-01-01^{PAL}	Unreleased	June 1999	January 1, 1999
Bust-A-Move 2 Arcade Edition	Probe Entertainment	Acclaim Entertainment	1998-05-20^{NA}	Unreleased	May 20, 1998	1998
Bust-A-Move 3 DX^{PAL} Bust-A-Move 99^{NA} Puzzle Bobble 64^{JP}	Distinctive Developments	Acclaim Entertainment^{WW} Taito^{JP}	1998-11^{PAL}	March 5, 1999	April 5, 1999	November 1998
California Speed	Atari Games; Midway Games	Midway	1999-03-18^{NA}	Unreleased	March 18, 1999	Unreleased
Carmageddon 64	Software Creations	Sales Curve Interactive^{PAL} Titus Interactive^{NA}	1999^{PAL}	Unreleased	July 26, 2000	1999
Castlevania	Konami Computer Entertainment Kobe	Konami	1999-01-26^{NA}	March 11, 1999	January 26, 1999	May 14, 1999
Castlevania: Legacy of Darkness	Konami Computer Entertainment Kobe	Konami	1999-12-08^{NA}	December 25, 1999	December 8, 1999	March 3, 2000
Centre Court Tennis^{PAL} Let's Smash^{JP}	Hudson Soft	Hudson Soft^{JP} Gaga Interactive Media^{PAL}	1998-10-09^{JP}	October 9, 1998	Unreleased	1999
Chameleon Twist	Japan System Supply	Sunsoft^{WW} Japan System Supply^{JP}	1997-12-09^{NA}	December 12, 1997	December 9, 1997	December 1997
Chameleon Twist 2	Japan System Supply	Japan System Supply^{JP} Sunsoft^{WW}	1998-12-25^{JP}	December 25, 1998	April 14, 1999	1999
Charlie Blast's Territory	Realtime Associates	Kemco	1999-04-02^{NA}	Unreleased	April 2, 1999	June 18, 1999
Chopper Attack	SETA	SETA^{JP} Midway^{NA} GT Interactive^{PAL}	1997-11-28^{JP}	November 28, 1997	June 16, 1998	September 1, 1998
Choro Q 64 2: Hachamecha Grand Prix Race	Locomotive Corporation	Takara	1999-12-24^{JP}	December 24, 1999	Unreleased	Unreleased
Chōkūkan Night: Pro Yakyū King	Genki	Imagineer	1996-12-20^{JP}	December 20, 1996	Unreleased	Unreleased
Chōkūkan Night: Pro Yakyū King 2	Genki	Imagineer	1999-03-19^{JP}	March 19, 1999	Unreleased	Unreleased
ClayFighter 63⅓	Interplay Productions	Interplay Productions	1997-10-23^{NA}	Unreleased	October 23, 1997	November 19, 1997
ClayFighter: Sculptor's Cut	Interplay Productions	Interplay Productions	1998-05-15^{NA}	Unreleased	May 15, 1998	Unreleased
Command & Conquer	Looking Glass Studios	Nintendo	1999-06-29^{NA}	Unreleased	June 29, 1999	July 30, 1999
Conker's Bad Fur Day	Rare	Rare^{NA} THQ^{PAL}	2001-03-05^{NA}	Unreleased	March 5, 2001	April 6, 2001^{EU} May 25, 2001^{AUS}
Cruis'n Exotica	Gratuitous Games	Midway	2000-10-17^{NA}	Unreleased	October 17, 2000	Unreleased
Cruis'n USA	Williams Entertainment	Nintendo	1996-12-02^{NA}	Unreleased	December 2, 1996	February 1998
Cruis'n World	Eurocom	Nintendo	1998-06-25^{PAL}	Unreleased	September 28, 1998	June 25, 1998
Custom Robo	Noise	Nintendo	1999-12-08^{JP}	December 8, 1999	Unreleased	Unreleased
Custom Robo V2	Noise	Nintendo	2000-11-10^{JP}	November 10, 2000	Unreleased	Unreleased
CyberTiger	Saffire	Electronic Arts	2000-03-08^{NA}	Unreleased	March 8, 2000	May 5, 2000
Daikatana	Ion Storm	Kemco	2000-03-31^{JP}	March 31, 2000	August 1, 2000	May 5, 2000
Dance Dance Revolution Disney Dancing Museum	Konami Computer Entertainment Kobe	Konami	2000-11-30^{JP}	November 30, 2000	Unreleased	Unreleased
Dark Rift; Supēsu Dainamaitsu^{JP}	Kronos Digital Entertainment	Vic Tokai	1997-07-08^{NA}	March 27, 1998	July 8, 1997	July 30, 1997
Densha de Go! 64	A.I	Taito	1999-07-30^{JP}	July 30, 1999	Unreleased	Unreleased
Derby Stallion 64	ParityBit	Media Factory	2001-08-10^{JP}	August 10, 2001	Unreleased	Unreleased
Destruction Derby 64	Looking Glass Studios	THQ	1999-09-30^{NA}	Unreleased	September 30, 1999	October 12, 1999
Dezaemon 3D	Athena	Athena	1998-06-26^{JP}	June 26, 1998	Unreleased	Unreleased
Diddy Kong Racing	Rare	Rare	1997-11-21^{JP/PAL}	November 21, 1997	November 24, 1997	November 21, 1997
Donald Duck: Quack Attack; Donald Duck: Goin' Quackers^{NA}	Ubi Soft Casablanca	Ubi Soft	2000-12-08^{PAL}	Unreleased	December 20, 2000	December 8, 2000
Donkey Kong 64	Rare	Nintendo	1999-11-22^{NA}	December 10, 1999	November 22, 1999	December 6, 1999
Doom 64	Midway Studios San Diego	Midway^{NA} Gamebank^{JP} GT Interactive^{PAL}	1997-04-04^{NA}	August 1, 1997	April 4, 1997	December 2, 1997
Doraemon: Nobita to Mittsu no Seireiseki	Epoch Co.	Epoch Co.	1997-03-21^{JP}	March 21, 1997	Unreleased	Unreleased
Doraemon 2: Nobita to Hikari no Shinden	Epoch Co.	Epoch Co.	1998-12-11^{JP}	December 11, 1998	Unreleased	Unreleased
Doraemon 3: Nobita no Machi SOS!	Epoch Co.	Epoch Co.	2000-07-28^{JP}	July 28, 2000	Unreleased	Unreleased
Dōbutsu no Mori	Nintendo EAD	Nintendo	2001-04-14^{JP}	April 14, 2001	Unreleased	Unreleased
Dr. Mario 64	Nintendo	Nintendo	2001-04-09^{NA}	Unreleased (Note: Released in Japan by Nintendo as part of Nintendo Puzzle Collection on February 7, 2003.)	April 9, 2001	Unreleased (Note: Released in PAL regions by Nintendo on Nintendo Classics on October 25, 2021.)
Dual Heroes	Produce!	Hudson Soft^{JP} Electro Brain^{NA} Gaga Interactive Media^{PAL}	1997-12-05^{JP}	December 5, 1997	November 5, 1998	April 12, 1998
Duck Dodgers Starring Daffy Duck; Daffy Duck Starring As Duck Dodgers^{PAL}	Paradigm Entertainment	Infogrames	2000-08-15^{NA}	Unreleased	August 15, 2000	October 27, 2000
Duke Nukem 64	Eurocom	GT Interactive	1997-11-14^{NA/PAL}	Unreleased	November 14, 1997	November 14, 1997
Duke Nukem: Zero Hour	Eurocom	GT Interactive	1999-08-31^{NA}	Unreleased	August 31, 1999	September 24, 1999
Earthworm Jim 3D	VIS Interactive	Rockstar Games^{NA} Interplay Entertainment^{PAL}	1999-11-04^{NA}	Unreleased	November 4, 1999	December 17, 1999
ECW Hardcore Revolution	Acclaim Studios Salt Lake City	Acclaim Entertainment	2000-02-17^{NA}	Unreleased	February 17, 2000	March 3, 2000
Eiko no Saint Andrews	SETA	SETA	1996-11-29^{JP}	November 29, 1996	Unreleased	Unreleased
Elmo's Letter Adventure	Realtime Associates	NewKidCo	1999-11-15^{NA}	Unreleased	November 15, 1999	Unreleased
Elmo's Number Journey	Realtime Associates	NewKidCo	1999-11-30^{NA}	Unreleased	November 30, 1999	Unreleased
Excitebike 64	Left Field Productions	Nintendo	2000-05-02^{NA}	June 23, 2000	May 2, 2000	June 8, 2001
Extreme-G	Probe Entertainment	Acclaim Entertainment	1997-10-27^{NA}	May 29, 1998	October 27, 1997	December 9, 1997
Extreme-G 2 Extreme-G2 XG2^{PAL}	Probe Entertainment	Acclaim Entertainment	1998-11-17^{NA}	September 10, 1999	November 17, 1998	December 4, 1998
F-1 World Grand Prix	Paradigm Entertainment	Video System	1998-07-27^{NA}	December 18, 1998	July 27, 1998	September 14, 1998
F-1 World Grand Prix II	Paradigm Entertainment	Video System	1999-07-02^{PAL}	Unreleased	Unreleased	July 2, 1999
F-Zero X	Nintendo EAD	Nintendo	1998-07-14^{JP}	July 14, 1998	October 27, 1998	November 6, 1998
F1 Pole Position 64; Human Grand Prix: The New Generation^{JP}	Human Entertainment	Human Entertainment^{JP} Ubi Soft^{WW}	1997-03-28^{JP}	March 28, 1997	October 15, 1997	October 1, 1997
F1 Racing Championship	Ubi Soft	Video System	2000-12-08^{PAL}	Unreleased	Unreleased (Note: NTSC-U version released exclusively in Brazil by Gradiente Entertainment on January 31, 2001.)	December 8, 2000
Famista 64	Namco	Namco	1997-11-28^{JP}	November 28, 1997	Unreleased	Unreleased
FIFA 99	EA Canada	EA Sports	1998-12^{NA}	Unreleased	December 1998	December 8, 1998
FIFA: Road to World Cup 98	EA Canada; Extended Play Productions	EA Sports^{WW} Electronic Arts Victor^{JP}	1997-12-20^{PAL}	April 12, 1998	December 22, 1997	December 20, 1997
FIFA Soccer 64; FIFA 64^{PAL}	EA Canada	EA Sports	1997-03-27^{NA}	Unreleased	March 27, 1997	March 1, 1997
Fighter Destiny 2	Genki; Opus Corp.	Imagineer^{JP} SouthPeak Interactive^{NA}	1999-08-27^{JP}	August 27, 1999	June 22, 2000	Unreleased
Fighters Destiny	Genki; Opus Corp.; Anchor Inc.	Ocean of America^{NA} Infogrames^{PAL} Imagineer^{JP}	1998-01-26^{NA}	December 11, 1998	January 26, 1998	March 1, 1998
Fighting Force 64	Core Design	Crave Entertainment	1999-06-01^{NA}	Unreleased	June 1, 1999	December 1999
Flying Dragon	Culture Brain	Culture Brain^{JP} Natsume Inc.^{WW}	1997-12-18^{JP}	December 18, 1997	October 14, 1998	July 25, 1999
Forsaken 64; Forsaken^{PAL}	Iguana UK	Acclaim Entertainment	1998-05-22^{PAL}	Unreleased	May 26, 1998	May 22, 1998
Fox Sports College Hoops '99	Z-Axis	Fox Sports Interactive	1998-11-23^{NA}	Unreleased	November 23, 1998	Unreleased
Fushigi no Dungeon: Fūrai no Shiren 2: Oni Shūrai! Shiren-jō!	Chunsoft	Nintendo	2000-09-27^{JP}	September 27, 2000	Unreleased	Unreleased
G.A.S.P!! Fighters' NEXTream; Deadly Arts^{NA}	Konami Computer Entertainment Osaka	Konami	1998-03-26^{JP}	March 26, 1998	September 29, 1998	September 1, 1998
Gauntlet Legends	Atari Games	Midway^{WW} Epoch Co.^{JP}	1999-08-31^{NA}	April 7, 2000	August 31, 1999	December 1, 1999
Getter Love!!	Hudson Soft	Hudson Soft	1998-12-04^{JP}	December 4, 1998	Unreleased	Unreleased
Gex 3: Deep Cover Gecko	Gratuitous Games	Crave Entertainment	1999-09-28^{NA}	Unreleased	September 28, 1999	July 24, 2000
Gex 64: Enter the Gecko	Realtime Associates	Midway^{NA} GT Interactive^{PAL}	1998-08-26^{NA}	Unreleased	August 26, 1998	February 26, 1999
Glover	Interactive Studios	Hasbro Interactive	1998-11-16^{NA}	Unreleased	November 16, 1998	November 24, 1998
Goemon Mononoke Sugoroku	Konami Computer Entertainment Kobe	Konami	1999-12-25^{JP}	December 25, 1999	Unreleased	Unreleased
GoldenEye 007	Rare	Nintendo	1997-08-23^{JP}	August 23, 1997	August 25, 1997	November 7, 1997
Golden Nugget 64	Westwood Pacific	Electronic Arts	1998-12-10^{NA}	Unreleased	December 10, 1998	Unreleased
GT 64: Championship Edition; City Tour GrandPrix: Zen Nihon GT Senshuken^{JP}	Imagineer	Ocean of America^{NA} Imagineer^{JP} Infogrames UK^{PAL}	1998-09-09^{NA}	October 30, 1998	September 9, 1998	1998
Hamster Monogatari 64	Culture Brain	Culture Brain	2001-04-06^{JP}	April 6, 2001	Unreleased	Unreleased
Harukanaru Augusta Masters '98	T&E Soft	T&E Soft	1997-12-26^{JP}	December 26, 1997	Unreleased	Unreleased
Harvest Moon 64	Victor Interactive Software	Pack-In-Soft^{JP} Natsume Inc.^{NA}	1999-02-05^{JP}	February 5, 1999	December 22, 1999	Unreleased (Note: Released in PAL regions by Natsume Inc. on Wii U Virtual Console on February 23, 2017.)
Heiwa Pachinko World 64	Shouei System	Amtex	1997-11-28^{JP}	November 28, 1997	Unreleased	Unreleased
Hercules: The Legendary Journeys	Player 1	Titus Interactive	2000-08-18^{NA}	Unreleased	August 18, 2000	October 6, 2000
Hexen	Software Creations	id Software^{WW} Gamebank^{JP}	1997-06-25^{NA}	December 18, 1997	June 25, 1997	December 1, 1997
Hey You, Pikachu!	Ambrella	Nintendo	1998-12-12^{JP}	December 12, 1998	November 6, 2000	Unreleased
Hot Wheels Turbo Racing	Stormfront Studios	Electronic Arts	1999-05-11^{PAL}	Unreleased	September 14, 1999	May 11, 1999
Hybrid Heaven	Konami Computer Entertainment Osaka	Konami	1999-08-05^{JP}	August 5, 1999	August 31, 1999	September 24, 1999
Hydro Thunder	Eurocom	Midway	2000-03-06^{NA}	Unreleased	March 6, 2000	May 14, 2000
Ide Yosuke no Mahjong Juku	SETA	SETA	2000-04-21^{JP}	April 21, 2000	Unreleased	Unreleased
Iggy's Reckin' Balls	Iguana Entertainment	Acclaim Entertainment	1998-08-24^{NA}	August 28, 1998	August 24, 1998	August 28, 1998
In-Fisherman Bass Hunter 64; Bass Hunter 64^{PAL}	Gearhead Entertainment	Take-Two Interactive	1999-07-30^{NA}	Unreleased	July 30, 1999	October 22, 1999
Indiana Jones and the Infernal Machine	Factor 5	LucasArts	2000-12-15^{NA}	Unreleased	December 15, 2000	Unreleased
Indy Racing 2000	Paradigm Entertainment	Infogrames	2000-06-07^{NA}	Unreleased	June 7, 2000	Unreleased
International Superstar Soccer 64; Jikkyō J.League Perfect Striker^{JP} Jikkyō World Soccer 3^{JP}	Konami Computer Entertainment Osaka	Konami	1996-12-20^{JP}	December 20, 1996	August 22, 1997	June 1, 1997
International Superstar Soccer 98; Jikkyō World Soccer: World Cup France '98^{JP}	Konami Computer Entertainment Osaka	Konami	1998-06-04^{JP}	June 4, 1998	August 21, 1998	September 1, 1998
International Superstar Soccer 2000; Jikkyō J-League 1999: Perfect Striker 2^{JP}	Konami Computer Entertainment Osaka	Konami	1999-07-29^{JP}	July 29, 1999	August 3, 2000	October 6, 2000
International Track & Field 2000; International Track & Field: Summer Games^{PAL} Ganbare! Nippon! Olympics 2000^{JP}	Konami Computer Entertainment Osaka	Konami	2000-05-28^{NA}	July 13, 2000	May 28, 2000	September 6, 2000
Itoi Shigesato no Bass Tsuri No. 1 Kettehan!	HAL Laboratory	Nintendo	2000-03-31^{JP}	March 31, 2000	Unreleased	Unreleased
J-League Dynamite Soccer 64	A-Max	Imagineer	1997-09-05^{JP}	September 5, 1997	Unreleased	Unreleased
J-League Eleven Beat 1997	Hudson Soft	Hudson Soft	1997-10-24^{JP}	October 24, 1997	Unreleased	Unreleased
J. League Live 64	Electronic Arts Victor	Electronic Arts Victor	1997-03-28^{JP}	March 28, 1997	Unreleased	Unreleased
J-League Tactics Soccer	ASCII Entertainment	ASCII Entertainment	1999-01-15^{JP}	January 15, 1999	Unreleased	Unreleased
Jango Simulation Mahjong-do 64	Art	Video System	1997-07-25^{JP}	July 25, 1997	Unreleased	Unreleased
Jeopardy!	GameTek	Take-Two Interactive	1998-02-25^{NA}	Unreleased	February 25, 1998	Unreleased
Jeremy McGrath Supercross 2000	Acclaim Studios Salt Lake City	Acclaim Sports	2000-02-28^{NA}	Unreleased	February 28, 2000	September 19, 2000
Jet Force Gemini; Star Twins^{JP}	Rare	Rare	1999-10-11^{NA}	December 1, 1999	October 11, 1999	October 29, 1999
Jikkyō GI Stable	Konami Computer Entertainment Nagoya	Konami	1999-04-28^{JP}	April 28, 1999	Unreleased	Unreleased
Jikkyō Powerful Pro Yakyū 4	Diamond Head	Konami	1997-03-14^{JP}	March 14, 1997	Unreleased	Unreleased
Jikkyō Powerful Pro Yakyū 5	Diamond Head	Konami	1998-03-26^{JP}	March 26, 1998	Unreleased	Unreleased
Jikkyō Powerful Pro Yakyū 6	Diamond Head	Konami	1999-03-25^{JP}	March 25, 1999	Unreleased	Unreleased
Jikkyō Powerful Pro Yakyū 2000	Diamond Head	Konami	2000-04-29^{JP}	April 29, 2000	Unreleased	Unreleased
Jikkyō Powerful Pro Yakyu Basic-ban 2001	Diamond Head	Konami	2001-03-29^{JP}	March 29, 2001	Unreleased	Unreleased
Jikkyō J-League Perfect Striker	Konami Computer Entertainment Osaka	Konami	1997-09-18^{JP}	September 18, 1997	Unreleased	Unreleased
Jinsei Game 64	Takara	Takara	1999-03-19^{JP}	March 19, 1999	Unreleased	Unreleased
Ken Griffey Jr.'s Slugfest	Angel Studios	Nintendo	1999-05-10^{NA}	Unreleased	May 10, 1999	Unreleased
Killer Instinct Gold	Rare	Nintendo	1996-11-25^{NA}	Unreleased	November 25, 1996	May 9, 1997^{AUS} July 4, 1997^{EU}
Kiratto Kaiketsu! 64 Tanteidan	Pandora Box	Imagineer	1998-10-23^{JP}	October 23, 1998	Unreleased	Unreleased
Kirby 64: The Crystal Shards	HAL Laboratory	Nintendo	2000-03-24^{JP}	March 24, 2000	June 26, 2000	June 22, 2001
Knife Edge: Nose Gunner; Knife Edge^{PAL}	Kemco	Kemco	1998-11-10^{NA}	November 27, 1998	November 10, 1998	1998
Knockout Kings 2000; Box Champions 2000^{PAL}	Black Ops Entertainment	EA Sports	1999-10-10^{PAL}	Unreleased	October 12, 1999	October 10, 1999
Kobe Bryant in NBA Courtside	Left Field Productions	Nintendo	1998-04-27^{NA}	Unreleased	April 27, 1998	June 10, 1998
Last Legion UX	Yuke's	Hudson Soft	1999-05-28^{JP}	May 28, 1999	Unreleased	Unreleased
The Legend of Zelda: Majora's Mask	Nintendo EAD	Nintendo	2000-04-27^{JP}	April 27, 2000	October 26, 2000	November 17, 2000
The Legend of Zelda: Ocarina of Time	Nintendo EAD	Nintendo	1998-11-21^{JP}	November 21, 1998	November 23, 1998	December 11, 1998^{EU} December 18, 1998^{AUS}
Lego Racers	High Voltage Software	Lego Media	1999-10-22^{NA}	Unreleased	October 22, 1999	November 5, 1999
Lode Runner 3-D	Big Bang	Infogrames^{WW} Banpresto^{JP}	1999-03-30^{NA}	July 30, 1999	March 30, 1999	1999
Mace: The Dark Age	Midway Games	Midway^{NA} GT Interactive^{PAL}	1997-09-30^{NA}	Unreleased	September 30, 1997	December 1997
Madden Football 64	Tiburon Entertainment	EA Sports	1997-10-24^{NA}	Unreleased	October 24, 1997	December 1997
Madden NFL 99	EA Tiburon	EA Sports	1998-09-22^{NA}	Unreleased	September 22, 1998	January 1999
Madden NFL 2000	EA Tiburon	EA Sports	1999-08-31^{NA}	Unreleased	August 31, 1999	Unreleased
Madden NFL 2001	EA Tiburon	EA Sports	2000-09-07^{NA}	Unreleased	September 7, 2000	Unreleased
Madden NFL 2002	Budcat Creations	EA Sports	2001-09-13^{NA}	Unreleased	September 13, 2001	Unreleased
Magical Tetris Challenge	Capcom	Capcom^{JP/NA}Activision^{PAL}	1998-11-20^{JP}	November 20, 1998	January 14, 1999	September 1999
Mahjong 64	Chat Noir	Koei	1997-04-04^{JP}	April 4, 1997	Unreleased	Unreleased
Mahjong Horoki Classic	Alpha Unit	Imagineer	1997-08-01^{JP}	August 1, 1997	Unreleased	Unreleased
Mahjong Master	Konami Computer Entertainment Osaka	Konami	1996-12-20^{JP}	December 20, 1996	Unreleased	Unreleased
Major League Baseball Featuring Ken Griffey Jr.	Angel Studios	Nintendo	1998-05-26^{NA}	Unreleased	May 26, 1998	1998^{AUS}
Mario Golf	Camelot Software Planning	Nintendo	1999-06-11^{JP}	June 11, 1999	July 26, 1999	September 14, 1999
Mario Kart 64	Nintendo EAD	Nintendo	1996-12-14^{JP}	December 14, 1996	February 10, 1997	June 24, 1997
Mario no Photopi	Datt Japan; Fuji Photo Film; Nintendo; Tokyo Electron	Tokyo Electron	1998-12-02^{JP}	December 2, 1998	Unreleased	Unreleased
Mario Party	Hudson Soft	Nintendo	1998-12-18^{JP}	December 18, 1998	February 8, 1999	March 9, 1999
Mario Party 2	Hudson Soft	Nintendo	1999-12-17^{JP}	December 17, 1999	January 24, 2000	October 13, 2000
Mario Party 3	Hudson Soft	Nintendo	2000-12-07^{JP}	December 7, 2000	May 7, 2001	September 3, 2001^{AUS} November 16, 2001^{EU}
Mario Tennis	Camelot Software Planning	Nintendo	2000-07-21^{JP}	July 21, 2000	August 28, 2000	November 3, 2000
Mega Man 64	Capcom Production Studio 2	Capcom	2000-11-22^{JP}	November 22, 2000	January 10, 2001	Unreleased
Mia Hamm Soccer 64^{NA} Michael Owen's WLS 2000^{PAL}	Silicon Dreams Studio	SouthPeak Interactive^{NA} THQ^{PAL}	2000-11-09^{NA}	Unreleased	November 9, 2000	November 10, 2000
Mickey's Speedway USA	Rare	Nintendo	2000-11-13^{NA}	January 21, 2001	November 13, 2000	December 1, 2000
Micro Machines 64 Turbo	Codemasters	Midway^{NA} Codemasters^{PAL}	1999-03-29^{NA}	Unreleased	March 29, 1999	April 23, 1999
Midway's Greatest Arcade Hits: Volume 1	Digital Eclipse	Midway	2000-11-14^{NA}	Unreleased	November 14, 2000	Unreleased
Mike Piazza's Strike Zone	Devil's Thumb Entertainment	GT Interactive	1998-06-18^{NA}	Unreleased	June 18, 1998	Unreleased
Milo's Astro Lanes	Player 1	Crave Entertainment^{NA} Interplay Entertainment^{PAL}	1998-11-24^{NA}	Unreleased	November 24, 1998	July 25, 1999
Mischief Makers	Treasure	Enix^{JP} Nintendo^{WW}	1997-06-27^{JP}	June 27, 1997	October 1, 1997	December 12, 1997
Mission Impossible	Infogrames	Ocean Software	1998-07-16^{NA}	Unreleased	July 16, 1998	September 25, 1998
Monopoly	Mind's Eye Productions	Hasbro Interactive	1999-12-18^{NA}	Unreleased	December 18, 1999	Unreleased
Monster Truck Madness 64	Edge of Reality	Rockstar Games	1999-07-30^{NA}	Unreleased	July 30, 1999	October 29, 1999
Morita Shogi 64	SETA	SETA	1998-04-03^{JP}	April 3, 1998	Unreleased	Unreleased
Mortal Kombat 4	Eurocom	Midway^{NA} GT Interactive^{PAL}	1998-06-23^{NA}	Unreleased	June 23, 1998	September 15, 1998
Mortal Kombat Mythologies: Sub-Zero	Avalanche Software	Midway^{NA} GT Interactive^{PAL}	1997-12-11^{NA}	Unreleased	December 11, 1997	February 12, 1998
Mortal Kombat Trilogy	Williams Entertainment	Midway^{NA} GT Interactive^{PAL}	1996-11-12^{NA}	Unreleased	November 12, 1996	March 14, 1997
MRC: Multi-Racing Championship	Genki	Imagineer^{JP} Ocean Software^{WW}	1997-07-18^{JP}	July 18, 1997	September 4, 1997	October 1997
Ms. Pac-Man Maze Madness	Mass Media	Namco	2000-11-13^{NA}	Unreleased	November 13, 2000	Unreleased
Mystical Ninja Starring Goemon	Konami Computer Entertainment Osaka	Konami	1997-08-07^{JP}	August 7, 1997	April 16, 1998	April 18, 1998
Mystical Ninja 2 Starring Goemon^{PAL} Goemon's Great Adventure^{NA}	Konami Computer Entertainment Osaka	Konami	1998-12-23^{JP}	December 23, 1998	September 15, 1999	June 18, 1999
Nagano Winter Olympics '98	Konami Computer Entertainment Osaka; Konami Computer Entertainment Tokyo	Konami	1997-12-18^{JP}	December 18, 1997	January 29, 1998	February 1998
Namco Museum 64	Mass Media	Namco	1999-11-29^{NA}	Unreleased	November 29, 1999	Unreleased
NASCAR '99	Stormfront Studios	EA Sports	1998-09-10^{NA}	Unreleased	September 10, 1998	November 1998
NASCAR 2000	Stormfront Studios	EA Sports	1999-09-13^{NA}	Unreleased	September 13, 1999	Unreleased
NBA Courtside 2 Featuring Kobe Bryant	Left Field Productions	Nintendo	1999-11-08^{NA}	Unreleased	November 8, 1999	Unreleased
NBA Hangtime	Midway Studios San Diego	Midway^{NA} GT Interactive^{PAL}	1997-01-16^{NA}	Unreleased	January 16, 1997	September 1, 1997
NBA In The Zone '98; NBA Pro '98^{PAL}	Konami Computer Entertainment Osaka	Konami	1998-01-29^{JP}	January 29, 1998	February 16, 1998	April 1998
NBA In The Zone '99; NBA Pro '99^{PAL}	Konami Computer Entertainment Osaka	Konami	1999-04-08^{NA}	June 3, 1999	April 8, 1999	1999
NBA In The Zone 2000	Konami Computer Entertainment Osaka	Konami	2000-02-18^{NA}	Unreleased	February 18, 2000	May 2000
NBA Jam 99	Iguana West	Acclaim Sports	1998-12-03^{NA}	Unreleased	December 3, 1998	December 1998
NBA Jam 2000	Acclaim Studios Salt Lake City	Acclaim Sports	1999-11-30^{NA}	Unreleased	November 30, 1999	January 21, 2000
NBA Live 99	NuFX	EA Sports	1998-11-04^{NA}	Unreleased	November 4, 1998	December 1998
NBA Live 2000	NuFX	EA Sports	1999-10-29^{NA}	Unreleased	October 29, 1999	December 1999
NBA Showtime: NBA on NBC	Eurocom	Midway	1999-11-16^{NA}	Unreleased	November 16, 1999	Unreleased
Neon Genesis Evangelion	BEC	Bandai	1999-06-25^{JP}	June 25, 1999	Unreleased	Unreleased
The New Tetris	H2O Entertainment; Blue Planet Software	Nintendo	1999-08-02^{NA}	Unreleased	August 2, 1999	October 15, 1999
NFL Blitz	Midway Games	Midway	1998-09-12^{NA}	Unreleased	September 12, 1998	Unreleased
NFL Blitz 2000	Midway Games	Midway	1999-08-18^{NA}	Unreleased	August 18, 1999	Unreleased
NFL Blitz 2001	Midway Games	Midway	2000-09-12^{NA}	Unreleased	September 12, 2000	Unreleased
NFL Blitz Special Edition	Point of View	Midway	2001-11-28^{NA}	Unreleased	November 28, 2001	Unreleased
NFL QB Club 2001	High Voltage Software	Acclaim Sports	2000-08-24^{NA}	Unreleased	August 24, 2000	Unreleased
NFL Quarterback Club 98	Iguana Entertainment	Acclaim Sports	1997-10-24^{NA}	Unreleased	October 24, 1997	December 1997
NFL Quarterback Club 99	Iguana Entertainment	Acclaim Sports	1998-11-10^{NA}	Unreleased	November 10, 1998	December 1998
NFL Quarterback Club 2000	Acclaim Studios Austin	Acclaim Sports	1999-08-26^{NA}	Unreleased	August 26, 1999	September 24, 1999
NHL 99	MBL Research	EA Sports	1998-10-01^{NA}	Unreleased	October 1, 1998	November 30, 1998
NHL Blades of Steel '99; NHL Pro 99^{PAL}	Konami Computer Entertainment Osaka	Konami	1999-04-05^{NA}	Unreleased	April 5, 1999	September 1999
NHL Breakaway 98	Iguana Entertainment	Acclaim Sports	1998-02-25^{NA}	Unreleased	February 25, 1998	1998
NHL Breakaway 99	Iguana West	Acclaim Sports	1998-11-30^{NA}	Unreleased	November 30, 1998	December 1998
Nightmare Creatures	Kalisto Entertainment	Activision	1998-11-30^{NA}	Unreleased	November 30, 1998	Unreleased
Nintama Rantarō 64 Game Gallery	Culture Brain	Culture Brain	2000-04-21^{JP}	April 21, 2000	Unreleased	Unreleased
Nuclear Strike 64	Pacific Coast Power & Light	THQ	1999-11-30^{NA}	Unreleased	November 30, 1999	March 3, 2000
Nushi Tsuri 64	Pack-In-Video	Victor Interactive Software	1998-11-27^{JP}	November 27, 1998	Unreleased	Unreleased
Nushi Tsuri 64: Shiokaze Ninotte	Victor Interactive Software	Victor Interactive Software	2000-05-26^{JP}	May 26, 2000	Unreleased	Unreleased
Off Road Challenge	Avalanche Software	Midway^{NA} GT Interactive^{PAL}	1998-06-30^{NA}	Unreleased	June 30, 1998	September 15, 1998
Ogre Battle 64: Person of Lordly Caliber	Quest Corporation	Nintendo^{JP} Atlus^{NA}	1999-07-14^{JP}	July 14, 1999	October 5, 2000	Unreleased (Note: Released in PAL regions by Square Enix on Wii Virtual Console on March 26, 2010.)
Olympic Hockey '98	Treyarch Invention	Midway^{NA} GT Interactive^{PAL} Konami^{JP}	1998-02-23^{NA}	July 16, 1998	February 23, 1998	April 1998
Onegai Monsters	Bottom Up	Bottom Up	1999-04-09^{JP}	April 9, 1999	Unreleased	Unreleased
Pachinko 365 Nichi	SETA	SETA	1998-05-29^{JP}	May 29, 1998	Unreleased	Unreleased
Paperboy	High Voltage Software	Midway	1999-11-04^{NA}	Unreleased	November 4, 1999	Unreleased
Paper Mario	Intelligent Systems	Nintendo	2000-08-11^{JP}	August 11, 2000	February 5, 2001	October 5, 2001
Parlor! Pro 64: Pachinko Jikki Simulation	Irem Software Engineering; Telenet Japan	Telenet Japan	1999-01-29^{JP}	January 29, 1999	Unreleased	Unreleased
PD Ultraman Battle Collection 64	Bandai	Bandai	1999-07-16^{JP}	July 16, 1999	Unreleased	Unreleased
Penny Racers; Choro Q 64^{JP}	Locomotive Corporation	Takara^{JP} THQ^{WW}	1998-07-17^{JP}	July 17, 1998	February 4, 1999	March 5, 1999
Perfect Dark	Rare	Rare	2000-05-22^{NA}	October 21, 2000	May 22, 2000	June 30, 2000
PGA European Tour Golf; PGA European Tour^{NA}	Infogrames Sheffield House	Infogrames	2000-05^{PAL}	Unreleased	June 15, 2000	May 2000
Pilotwings 64	Nintendo EAD; Nintendo R&D3; Paradigm Simulation	Nintendo	1996-06-23^{JP}	June 23, 1996	September 29, 1996	March 1, 1997
Pocket Monsters Stadium	Nintendo EAD	Nintendo	1998-08-01^{JP}	August 1, 1998	Unreleased	Unreleased
Pokémon Puzzle League	Nintendo Software Technology	Nintendo	2000-09-25^{NA}	Unreleased	September 25, 2000	March 2, 2001
Pokémon Snap	HAL Laboratory	Nintendo	1999-03-21^{JP}	March 21, 1999	July 26, 1999	March 23, 2000^{AUS} September 15, 2000^{EU}
Pokémon Stadium; Pokémon Stadium 2^{JP}	Nintendo EAD	Nintendo	1999-04-30^{JP}	April 30, 1999	March 6, 2000	March 23, 2000^{AUS} April 7, 2000^{EU}
Pokémon Stadium 2 Pokémon Stadium Gold Silver^{JP}	Nintendo EAD	Nintendo	2000-12-14^{JP}	December 14, 2000	March 26, 2001	April 7, 2001^{AUS} October 10, 2001^{EU}
Polaris SnoCross	Vicarious Visions	Vatical Entertainment	2000-12-27^{NA}	Unreleased	December 27, 2000	Unreleased
Power League 64	Hudson Soft	Hudson Soft	1997-08-08^{JP}	August 8, 1997	Unreleased	Unreleased
Power Rangers Lightspeed Rescue	Mass Media	THQ	2000-09-27^{NA}	Unreleased	September 27, 2000	December 8, 2000
The Powerpuff Girls: Chemical X-Traction	VIS Entertainment; Asylum Entertainment	BAM! Entertainment	2001-11-19^{NA}	Unreleased	November 19, 2001	Unreleased
Premier Manager 64	Dinamic Multimedia	Gremlin Interactive	1999-08^{PAL}	Unreleased	Unreleased	August 1999
Pro Mahjong Kiwame 64	Athena	Athena	1997-11-21^{JP}	November 21, 1997	Unreleased	Unreleased
Pro Shinan Mahjong Tsuwamono 64: Jansō Battle ni Chōsen	Culture Brain	Culture Brain	1999-11-05^{JP}	November 5, 1999	Unreleased	Unreleased
Puyo Puyo Sun 64	Compile	Compile	1997-10-31^{JP}	October 31, 1997	Unreleased	Unreleased
Puyo Puyo~n Party	Compile	Compile	1999-12-03^{JP}	December 3, 1999	Unreleased	Unreleased
Quake 64	Midway Studios San Diego	Midway^{NA} GT Interactive^{PAL}	1998-03-24^{NA}	Unreleased	March 24, 1998	May 24, 1998
Quake II	Raster Productions	Activision	1999-07-07^{NA}	Unreleased	July 7, 1999	1999
Quest 64; Holy Magic Century^{PAL}	Imagineer	THQ^{NA} Konami^{PAL} Imagineer^{JP}	1998-06-10^{NA}	July 9, 1999	June 10, 1998	September 30, 1998
Rakugakids	Konami Computer Entertainment Kobe	Konami	1998-07-23^{JP}	July 23, 1998	Unreleased	December 4, 1998
Racing Simulation: Monaco Grand Prix^{PAL} Monaco Grand Prix^{NA}	Ubi Soft Paris	Ubi Soft	1999-06^{PAL}	Unreleased	September 1999	June 1999
Rally Challenge 2000; Rally '99^{JP}	Genki	Imagineer^{JP} SouthPeak Interactive^{NA}	1999-08-06^{JP}	August 6, 1999	June 30, 2000	Unreleased
Rampage 2: Universal Tour	Avalanche Software	Midway^{NA} GT Interactive^{PAL}	1999-03-31^{NA}	Unreleased	March 31, 1999	May 21, 1999
Rampage World Tour	Saffire	Midway^{NA} GT Interactive^{PAL}	1998-03-30^{NA}	Unreleased	March 30, 1998	June 1998
Rat Attack!	Pure Entertainment	Mindscape	2000-04-21^{PAL}	Unreleased	September 12, 2000	April 21, 2000
Rayman 2: The Great Escape	Ubi Pictures	Ubi Soft	1999-10-29^{EU}	Unreleased	November 9, 1999	October 29, 1999^{EU} November 22, 1999^{AUS}
Razor Freestyle Scooter	Titanium Studios	Crave Entertainment	2001-11-27^{NA}	Unreleased	November 27, 2001	Unreleased
Re-Volt	Acclaim Studios London	Acclaim Entertainment	1999-08-18^{NA}	Unreleased	August 18, 1999	September 3, 1999
Ready 2 Rumble Boxing	Point of View	Midway	1999-11-16^{NA}	Unreleased	November 16, 1999	December 10, 1999
Ready 2 Rumble Boxing: Round 2	Point of View	Midway	2000-11-13^{NA}	Unreleased	November 13, 2000	Unreleased
Resident Evil 2	Angel Studios; Capcom Production Studio 3; Factor 5	Capcom^{JP/NA} Virgin Interactive Entertainment^{PAL}	1999-11-16^{NA}	January 28, 2000	November 16, 1999	February 9, 2000
Ridge Racer 64	Nintendo Software Technology	Nintendo	2000-02-14^{NA}	Unreleased	February 14, 2000	July 4, 2000
Road Rash 64	Pacific Coast Power & Light	THQ	1999-09-22^{NA}	Unreleased	September 22, 1999	December 17, 1999
Roadsters	Titus Interactive	Titus Interactive	1999-12-14^{NA}	Unreleased	December 14, 1999	December 17, 1999
Robot Ponkottsu 64: Nanatsu no Umi no Caramel	Red Company	Hudson Soft	1999-12-24^{JP}	December 24, 1999	Unreleased	Unreleased
Robotron 64	Player 1	Crave Entertainment^{NA} GT Interactive^{PAL}	1998-01-05^{NA}	Unreleased	January 5, 1998	June 1998
Rocket: Robot on Wheels	Sucker Punch Productions	Ubi Soft	1999-11-17^{NA}	Unreleased	November 17, 1999	December 17, 1999
Rugrats in Paris - The Movie	Avalanche Software	THQ	2000-11-08^{NA}	Unreleased	November 8, 2000	March 30, 2001
Rugrats: Scavenger Hunt; Rugrats: Treasure Hunt^{PAL}	Realtime Associates	THQ	1999-06-28^{NA}	Unreleased	June 28, 1999	August 10, 1999
Rush 2: Extreme Racing USA	Atari Games	Midway^{NA} GT Interactive^{PAL}	1998-11-11^{NA}	Unreleased	November 11, 1998	February 4, 1999
S.C.A.R.S.	Vivid Image	Ubi Soft	1998-12-03^{NA}	Unreleased	December 3, 1998	January 1999
Saikyō Habu Shōgi	SETA	SETA	1996-06-23^{JP}	June 23, 1996	Unreleased	Unreleased
San Francisco Rush 2049	Midway Games West	Midway	2000-09-06^{NA}	Unreleased	September 6, 2000	November 17, 2000
San Francisco Rush: Extreme Racing	Midway Games	Midway^{NA} GT Interactive^{PAL}	1997-11-07^{NA}	Unreleased	November 7, 1997	December 1997
Scooby-Doo! Classic Creep Capers	Terraglyph Interactive Studios	THQ	2000-11-29^{NA}	Unreleased	November 29, 2000	March 30, 2001
S.D. Hiryū no Ken Densetsu	Culture Brain	Culture Brain	1999-01-29^{JP}	January 29, 1999	Unreleased	Unreleased
Shadow Man	Acclaim Studios Teesside	Acclaim Entertainment	1999-08-31^{NA}	Unreleased	August 31, 1999	September 3, 1999
Shadowgate 64: Trials of the Four Towers	TNS Co.; Infinite Ventures	Kemco	1999-06-09^{NA}	August 13, 1999	June 9, 1999	July 30, 1999
Shin Nippon Pro Wrestling: Toukon Road - Brave Spirits	Yuke's	Hudson Soft	1998-01-04^{JP}	January 4, 1998	Unreleased	Unreleased
Shin Nippon Pro Wrestling: Toukon Road 2- Next Generation	Yuke's	Hudson Soft	1998-12-26^{JP}	December 26, 1998	Unreleased	Unreleased
Sim City 2000	Maxis; Genki	Imagineer	1998-01-30^{JP}	January 30, 1998	Unreleased	Unreleased
Sin and Punishment; Tsumi to Batsu: Hoshi no Keishōsha^{JP}	Treasure Nintendo R&D 1	Nintendo	2000-11-21^{JP}	November 21, 2000	Unreleased (Note: Released in North America by Nintendo on Wii Virtual Console on October 1st, 2007.)	Unreleased (Note: Released in PAL regions by Nintendo on Wii Virtual Console on September 28th, 2007.)
Snowboard Kids	Racdym	Atlus^{JP/NA} Nintendo^{PAL}	1997-12-12^{JP}	December 12, 1997	March 13, 1998	March 16, 1998
Snowboard Kids 2	Racdym	Atlus	1999-02-19^{JP}	February 19, 1999	March 1, 1999	April 30, 1999^{AUS}
South Park	Iguana Entertainment	Acclaim Entertainment	1998-12-21^{NA}	Unreleased	December 21, 1998	May 3, 1999
South Park: Chef's Luv Shack	Acclaim Studios Austin	Acclaim Entertainment	1999-12^{PAL}	Unreleased	December 8, 1999	December 1999
South Park Rally	Tantalus Interactive	Acclaim Entertainment	2000-02-28^{NA}	Unreleased	February 28, 2000	March 3, 2000
Space Invaders	Z-Axis	Activision	1999-11-30^{NA}	Unreleased	November 30, 1999	Unreleased
Space Station Silicon Valley	DMA Design	Take-Two Interactive	1998-10-22^{NA}	Unreleased	October 22, 1998	November 1998
Spider-Man	Edge of Reality	Activision	2000-11-21^{NA}	Unreleased	November 21, 2000	Unreleased
StarCraft 64	Blizzard Entertainment; Mass Media	Nintendo	2000-06-13^{NA}	Unreleased	June 13, 2000	May 25, 2001^{AUS}
Star Fox 64; Lylat Wars^{PAL}	Nintendo EAD	Nintendo	1997-04-27^{JP}	April 27, 1997	June 30, 1997	October 4, 1997
Starshot: Space Circus Fever	Infogrames	Infogrames	1998-12-04^{PAL}	Unreleased	June 29, 1999	December 4, 1998
Star Soldier: Vanishing Earth	Hudson Soft	Hudson Soft^{JP} Electro Brain^{NA}	1998-07-10^{JP}	July 10, 1998	December 15, 1998	Unreleased
Star Wars Episode I: Battle for Naboo	Factor 5; LucasArts	LucasArts^{NA} THQ^{PAL}	2000-12-15^{NA}	Unreleased	December 15, 2000	March 30, 2001
Star Wars Episode I: Racer	LucasArts	LucasArts	1999-05-18^{NA}	July 21, 1999	May 18, 1999	June 4, 1999
Star Wars: Rogue Squadron	Factor 5; LucasArts	LucasArts^{NA} Nintendo^{PAL}	1998-12-08^{NA}	August 27, 1999	December 8, 1998	January 10, 1999
Star Wars: Shadows of the Empire	LucasArts	Nintendo	1996-12-03^{NA}	June 14, 1997	December 3, 1996	March 1, 1997
Stunt Racer 64	Boss Game Studios	Midway	2000-10-03^{NA}	Unreleased	October 3, 2000	Unreleased
Super B-Daman: Battle Phoenix 64	Hudson Soft	Hudson Soft	1998-07-24^{JP}	July 24, 1998	Unreleased	Unreleased
Super Bowling	Athena	Athena^{JP} UFO Interactive Games^{NA}	1999-03-26^{JP}	March 26, 1999	July 12, 2000	Unreleased
Supercross 2000	MBL Research	EA Sports	1999-12-03^{NA}	Unreleased	December 3, 1999	February 2000
Superman: The New Superman Adventures; Superman^{PAL}	Titus Interactive	Titus Interactive	1999-05-28^{NA}	Unreleased	May 28, 1999	July 23, 1999
Super Mario 64	Nintendo EAD	Nintendo	1996-06-23^{JP}	June 23, 1996	September 29, 1996	March 1, 1997
Super Robot Spirits	Banpresto	Banpresto	1998-07-17^{JP}	July 17, 1998	Unreleased	Unreleased
Super Robot Taisen 64	A.I	Banpresto	1999-10-29^{JP}	October 29, 1999	Unreleased	Unreleased
Super Smash Bros.	HAL Laboratory	Nintendo	1999-01-21^{JP}	January 21, 1999	April 26, 1999	November 19, 1999
Susume! Taisen Puzzle Dama: Tōkon! Marutama Chō	Konami Computer Entertainment Kobe	Konami	1998-03-26^{JP}	March 26, 1998	Unreleased	Unreleased
Tarzan	Eurocom	Activision	2000-02-15^{NA}	Unreleased	February 15, 2000	April 21, 2000
Taz Express	Zed Two	Infogrames	2000-08-01^{PAL}	Unreleased	Unreleased	August 1, 2000
Tetris 64	Amtex	SETA	1998-11-13^{JP}	November 13, 1998	Unreleased	Unreleased
Tetrisphere	H2O Entertainment	Nintendo	1997-08-11^{NA}	Unreleased	August 11, 1997	February 1998
Tigger's Honey Hunt	DokiDenki Studio	NewKidCo^{NA} Ubi Soft^{PAL}	2000-10-27^{NA}	Unreleased	October 27, 2000	April 6, 2001
Tom Clancy's Rainbow Six	Saffire	Red Storm Entertainment	1999-11-17^{NA}	Unreleased	November 17, 1999	December 1999
Tom and Jerry in Fists of Furry	VIS Entertainment	NewKidCo^{NA} Ubi Soft^{PAL}	2000-11-08^{NA}	Unreleased	November 8, 2000	2000
Tonic Trouble	Ubi Soft Montreal	Ubi Soft	1999-08-31^{NA/PAL}	Unreleased	August 31, 1999	August 31, 1999
Tony Hawk's Pro Skater; Tony Hawk's Skateboarding^{PAL}	Edge of Reality	Activision	2000-03-15^{NA}	Unreleased	March 15, 2000	March 24, 2000
Tony Hawk's Pro Skater 2	Edge of Reality	Activision	2001-08-21^{NA}	Unreleased	August 21, 2001	October 12, 2001
Tony Hawk's Pro Skater 3	Edge of Reality	Activision	2002-08-20^{NA}	Unreleased	August 20, 2002	Unreleased
Top Gear Hyper-Bike	Snowblind Studios	Kemco	2000-03-17^{JPN}	March 17, 2000	March 27, 2000	2000
Top Gear Overdrive	Snowblind Studios	Kemco	1998-11-23^{NA}	March 19, 1999	November 23, 1998	November 25, 1998
Top Gear Rally	Boss Game Studios	Midway^{NA} Kemco^{JP/PAL}	1997-09-30^{NA}	December 5, 1997	September 30, 1997	November 1997
Top Gear Rally 2	Saffire	Kemco	1999-12-03^{NA}	February 4, 2000	December 3, 1999	February 28, 2000
Toy Story 2: Buzz Lightyear to the Rescue!	Traveller's Tales	Activision	1999-11-16^{NA}	Unreleased	November 16, 1999	February 4, 2000
Transformers: Beast Wars Transmetals	Locomotive Corporation	Takara^{JP} Bay Area Multimedia^{NA}	1999-10-01^{JP}	October 1, 1999	July 12, 2000	Unreleased
Triple Play 2000	Treyarch Invention	EA Sports	1999-03-24^{NA}	Unreleased	March 24, 1999	Unreleased
Turok 2: Seeds of Evil; Violence Killer: Turok New Generation^{JP}	Iguana Entertainment	Acclaim Entertainment^{WW} gemzi^{JP}	1998-12-10^{NA}	June 18, 1999	December 10, 1998	December 18, 1998
Turok 3: Shadow of Oblivion	Acclaim Studios Austin	Acclaim Entertainment	2000-08-31^{NA}	Unreleased	August 31, 2000	September 8, 2000
Turok: Dinosaur Hunter	Iguana Entertainment	Acclaim Entertainment	1997-03-04^{NA/EU}	May 30, 1997	March 4, 1997	March 4, 1997^{EU} March 17, 1997^{AUS}
Turok: Rage Wars	Acclaim Studios Austin	Acclaim Entertainment	1999-11-23^{NA}	Unreleased	November 23, 1999	December 26, 1999
Twisted Edge Extreme Snowboarding^{NA} Twisted Edge Snowboarding^{PAL} King Hill 64: Extreme Snowboarding^{JP}	Boss Game Studios	Midway^{NA} Kemco^{JP/PAL}	1998-11-11^{NA}	December 18, 1998	November 11, 1998	March 12, 1999
Ucchan Nanchan no Hono no Challenge: Denryu Ira Ira Bo	Yuke's	Hudson Soft	1997-12-19^{JP}	December 19, 1997	Unreleased	Unreleased
V-Rally: Edition '99	Eden Studios	Infogrames^{WW} Spike^{JP}	1998-12-11^{PAL}	October 14, 1999	September 15, 1999	December 11, 1998
Vigilante 8	Luxoflux	Activision	1999-03-17^{NA}	Unreleased	March 17, 1999	March 1999
Vigilante 8: 2nd Offense	Luxoflux	Activision	2000-02-01^{NA}	Unreleased	February 1, 2000	February 25, 2000
Virtual Chess 64	Titus France	Titus Interactive	1998-06-10^{NA}	Unreleased	June 10, 1998	July 1998
Virtual Pool 64	Celeris	Crave Entertainment	1998-12-17^{NA}	Unreleased	December 17, 1998	February 26, 1999
Virtual Pro Wrestling 2: Ōdō Keishō	Asmik Ace Entertainment; AKI Corporation	Asmik Ace Entertainment	2000-01-28^{JP}	January 28, 2000	Unreleased	Unreleased
Virtual Pro Wrestling 64	Asmik Ace Entertainment; AKI Corporation	Asmik Ace Entertainment	1997-12-19^{JP}	December 19, 1997	Unreleased	Unreleased
Waialae Country Club: True Golf Classics	T&E Soft	Nintendo	1998-07-27^{NA}	Unreleased	July 27, 1998	August 24, 1998
War Gods	Eurocom	Midway^{NA} GT Interactive^{PAL}	1997-05-20^{NA}	Unreleased	May 20, 1997	November 28, 1997
Wave Race 64	Nintendo EAD	Nintendo	1996-09-27^{JP}	September 27, 1996	November 4, 1996	April 29, 1997
Wayne Gretzky's 3D Hockey	Atari Games	Midway^{NA} GT Interactive^{PAL} GameBank^{JP}	1996-11-15^{NA}	February 28, 1998	November 15, 1996	March 1, 1997
Wayne Gretzky's 3D Hockey '98	Software Creations	Midway^{NA} GT Interactive^{PAL}	1997-12-03^{NA}	Unreleased	December 3, 1997	June 1, 1998
WCW Backstage Assault	Kodiak Interactive	Electronic Arts	2000-12-12^{NA}	Unreleased	December 12, 2000	Unreleased
WCW Mayhem	Kodiak Interactive	Electronic Arts	1999-09-23^{NA}	Unreleased	September 23, 1999	September 24, 1999
WCW Nitro	Inland Productions	THQ	1999-02-09^{NA}	Unreleased	February 9, 1999	Unreleased
WCW vs. nWo: World Tour	Asmik Ace Entertainment; AKI Corporation	THQ	1997-12-02^{NA}	Unreleased	December 2, 1997	February 12, 1998
WCW/nWo Revenge	Asmik Ace Entertainment; AKI Corporation	THQ	1998-10-26^{NA}	Unreleased	October 26, 1998	November 30, 1998
Wetrix	Zed Two	Ocean Software^{WW} Imagineer^{JP}	1998-06-12^{NA}	November 27, 1998	June 12, 1998	June 19, 1998
Wheel of Fortune	GameTek	Take-Two Interactive	1997-12-02^{NA}	Unreleased	December 2, 1997	Unreleased
WinBack: Covert Operations; Operation: WinBack^{PAL}	Omega Force	Koei^{JP/NA} Virgin Interactive Entertainment^{PAL}	1999-09-23^{JP}	September 23, 1999	October 19, 1999	July 7, 2000
Wipeout 64	Psygnosis	Midway	1998-11-04^{NA}	Unreleased	November 4, 1998	February 5, 1999
Wonder Project J2: Koruro no Mori no Josette	Givro Corporation	Enix	1996-11-22^{JP}	November 22, 1996	Unreleased	Unreleased
World Cup 98	Software Creations	EA Sports	1998-05-19^{NA}	Unreleased	May 19, 1998	May 22, 1998
World Driver Championship	Boss Game Studios	Midway	1999-06-15^{NA}	Unreleased	June 15, 1999	November 5, 1999
The World Is Not Enough	Eurocom	EA Games	2000-10-17^{NA}	Unreleased	October 17, 2000	December 8, 2000
Worms Armageddon	Infogrames Lyon House	Infogrames	1999-12-11^{PAL}	Unreleased	March 23, 2000	December 11, 1999
WWF Attitude	Acclaim Studios Salt Lake City	Acclaim Sports	1999-08-09^{PAL}	Unreleased	August 31, 1999	August 9, 1999
WWF No Mercy	Asmik Ace Entertainment; AKI Corporation	THQ	2000-11-14^{NA}	Unreleased	November 14, 2000	December 15, 2000
WWF War Zone	Iguana West	Acclaim Sports	1998-08-11^{NA}	Unreleased	August 11, 1998	August 28, 1998
WWF WrestleMania 2000	AKI Corporation	THQ^{WW} Asmik Ace^{JP}	1999-11-18^{NA}	September 15, 2000	November 18, 1999	December 10, 1999
Xena: Warrior Princess: The Talisman of Fate; Xena: Warrior Princess^{PAL}	Saffire	Titus Interactive	1999-12-06^{NA}	Unreleased	December 6, 1999	December 17, 1999
Yakochu II: Satsujin Koro	Athena	Athena	1999-10-22^{JP}	October 22, 1999	Unreleased	Unreleased
Yoshi's Story	Nintendo EAD	Nintendo	1997-12-21^{JP}	December 21, 1997	March 10, 1998	May 10, 1998
Zool: Majū Tsukai Densetsu	Pandora Box	Imagineer	1999-06-11^{JP}	June 11, 1999	Unreleased	Unreleased

== Aftermarket releases ==
Title	Developer(s)	Publisher(s)	Release date	Notes					
Title	Developer(s)	Publisher(s)	Release date	Notes	40 Winks	Eurocom	Piko Interactive	April 15, 2019	Originally to be published by GT Interactive around late 1999 to early 2000 but canceled. The Nintendo 64 port was published by Piko Interactive in 2019 after being funded through Kickstarter.
Croc: Legend of the Gobbos	Argonaut Games	ModRetro	2027	An original port of the game. Released as an M64 cartridge.					
Dragon Sword	Interactive Studios	Piko Interactive	TBA	Originally to be published by MGM Interactive but cancelled. The game is planned to be published by Piko Interactive.					
Glover 2	Interactive Studios	Piko Interactive	TBA	Originally to be published by Hasbro Interactive around mid 1999 but cancelled. The game is planned to be published by Piko Interactive.					
R64	Rasky	Remute	March 25, 2022	A "playable album" consisting only of music and a 3D visualizer, it is one of several albums by German musician Remute designed to be played on older video game hardware.					
Xeno Crisis	Bitmap Bureau	Bitmap Bureau	April 2023	Published for eighth generation consoles, the game was ported to several retro consoles in 2023.					
Xibalba 64	Phoboslab	ModRetro	2026	Based on a 2014 browser tech demo, as well as many 1990s shooter games. Released as an M64 cartridge.					

== See also ==
- List of best-selling Nintendo 64 video games
- List of cancelled Nintendo 64 games
