= NBA in the Zone =

Video game series

Glen Rice was featured on the cover of NBA In The Zone '98.

NBA in the Zone (also known in Japan as NBA Power Dunkers and in Australia & Europe as NBA Pro) is a series of basketball video games released by Konami for the PlayStation and Nintendo 64 video game consoles. Konami followed up the In The Zone series with the release of NBA Starting Five for the Xbox and PlayStation 2.

== History ==
The series started out with two releases on the PlayStation, including the original NBA In the Zone. After the release of NBA In The Zone 2 in 1996, the series started adopting a yearly naming scheme. The series also started to use NBA players to endorse the games and appear on the series' box art. Konami released three more games in this format for both Nintendo 64 and PlayStation, NBA In The Zone '98, NBA In The Zone '99, and NBA In The Zone 2000. NBA In The Zone '98 and NBA In The Zone '99 featured Glen Rice on the cover, while the 2000 game featured Marcus Camby.

== Features ==
NBA In The Zone 2 featured NBA rosters from the 1996-1997 NBA season and support for up to eight players, and introduced substitutions and the ability to play both a full season or playoffs to the series. It also featured the National Anthem (American and Canadian).

NBA In The Zone '98 (also known as NBA Pro 98 in Australia and Europe) featured NBA rosters from the 1997-1998 NBA season. As in previous In The Zone games, players such as Michael Jordan are not in the game and likenesses with generic names take their places. The game retains the "Create a Player" and season/playoffs features of NBA In The Zone 2.

NBA In The Zone 2000 was released in February 2000. The game features 29 NBA teams and more than 300 NBA players, animated using motion captured animation. Ray Clay, at the time the public address announcer for the Chicago Bulls does voice commentary. Along with the standard gameplay modes like Exhibition, Season, and Playoffs, a Slam Dunk Contest and Three-point Shootout are also included.

== See also ==
- Double Dribble
- Run and Gun
