= List of sumo video games =

This is a list of video games based on the wrestling sport of sumo.

== Published exclusively in Japan ==
These games were published exclusively in Japan.

- Shusse Ōzumō - Arcade - 1984
- Tsuppari Ōzumō [jp]- Family Computer, Virtual Console - 1987
- Terao no Dosukoi Ōzumō [jp] - Family Computer - 1989
- Chiyonofuji no Ōichō - Family Computer - 1990
- SD Battle Ōzumō: Heisei Hero Basho - Family Computer - 1990
- Ōzumō Spirit - Super Famicom - 1992
- Super Ōzumō: Netsusen Daiichiban - Super Famicom - 1992
- Masakari Densetsu: Kintarou Action-Hen (Sumo-based game) - Game Boy - 1992
- Tsuppari Ōzumō: Heisei Han - PC Engine - 1993
- Tsuppari Ōzumō: Risshin Shusse Hen - Super Famicom - 1993
- Waka Taka Ōzumō: Brothers Dream Match - Super Famicom - 1993
- Aah! Harimanada - Game Gear, Game Boy, Genesis - 1993
- Onita Atsushi FMW (features Sumo elements) - Super Famicom - 1993
- Yokozuna Monogatari - Super Famicom - 1994
- Deae Tonosama Appare Ichiban (features Sumo scenes) - Super Famicom - 1995
- 64 Ōzumō - Nintendo 64 - 1997
- 64 Ōzumō 2 - Nintendo 64 - 1999
- Nippon Sumō Kyōkai Kōnin: Nippon Ōzumō - PlayStation - 2000
- Simple 1500 Series Vol. 58: The Sumo - PlayStation - 2001
- Nippon Ōzumō Kakutōhen - PlayStation 2 - 2001
- Nihon Sumō Kyōkai Kōnin: Nihon Ōzumō Gekitō Honbashohen - PlayStation 2 - 2002
- Domo-kun no Fushigi Terebi - Game Boy Advance - 2002

== Published internationally ==
- Sumo Wrestlers - Commodore 64 - 1985 (published exclusively in North America and Europe)
- Sumo Fighter: Tōkaidō Basho - Game Boy - JP 1991 (NA 1993)
- Super Duper Sumos - Game Boy Advance (NA October 26, 2003)
- Sumo Slam - non-commercial flash PC game by Orange Fox Games - 2007
- Spaceman Sumo - BlackBerry - 2009
- Tsuppari Ōzumō Wii Heya (JP) / Eat! Fat! Fight! (NA) - Wii - 2009
- Sumotori Dreams - PC - 2007
- The Sumou - iPhone/iPod - 2011 (NA)
- Sumoscience - iPhone/iPod - 2019
- SumoscienceAR - iPhone/iPod - 2020

== See also ==
- List of fighting games
- List of professional wrestling video games
