= Olympic Hockey =

Olympic Hockey may refer to

- Field hockey at the Summer Olympics
- Ice hockey at the Olympic Games
- Olympic Hockey Nagano '98, a Nintendo 64 video game
