= NBA In The Zone (video game) =

1995 basketball video game

- North American cover art
- Developer(s): Konami
- Publisher(s): Konami
- Platform(s): PlayStation
- Release: NA: 12 December 1995; JP: 22 December 1995; EU: April 1996
- Genre(s): Sports
- Mode(s): Single-player, multiplayer

NBA In The Zone is a video game developed and published by Konami for the PlayStation. It is the first game in the NBA in the Zone series. The game is part of Konami's XXL Sports brand. It has many sequels. NBA In The Zone 2, released in 1996, NBA In The Zone '98, released in 1997, NBA In The Zone 99, released in 1998 and NBA In The Zone 2000, released in February 2000. The cover features a shot of the Western Conference Finals from the 1995 NBA Playoffs between the Houston Rockets and San Antonio Spurs.

== Development ==
NBA In The Zone is a 32-bit sports game, the second such release from Konami after Goal Storm.

== Gameplay ==
NBA In The Zone features an NBA license, and is set during the 1995–96 NBA season, although the game featured rosters mainly from the 1994–95 NBA season due to the 1995 NBA lockout. The game only uses five players on each team, and only plays through the playoffs and exhibition games.

== Reception ==
Next Generation reviewed the PlayStation version of the game, rating it three stars out of five, and stated that "The supernatural two-on-two of NBA Jam was more honest."

Johnny Ballgame of GamePro gave the original game a mixed review, criticizing the difficult controls when playing defense, the crowd which makes no noise except during replays and "looks like a cardboard cutout", and the inappropriately mellow music, but praising the variety of moves, fun graphical effects, and high level of detail on the players. Noting that the game is more "in the tradition of NBA Jam" than a realistic basketball sim, he deemed it worth buying as a holdover until more solidly outstanding basketball games arrive on the PlayStation. Next Generation's brief review stated, "Although it looks good, this is a basketball game for fans who just like to watch highlight reels: non-existent defense and muddy controls mar a promising effort." They scored it two out of five stars.

== Reviews ==
- GameFan (Dec, 1995)
- Electronic Gaming Monthly (Feb, 1996)
- Video Games & Computer Entertainment - Dec, 1995
- GamePro - Mar, 1996
- IGN - Nov 25, 199
