= Wayne Gretzky and the NHLPA All-Stars =

1995 video game

- North American SNES cover art
- Developers: Time Warner Interactive (Genesis); Cygnus Multimedia Productions (SNES)
- Publisher: Time Warner Interactive
- Composer: Andy Armer
- Platforms: Super NES, Genesis, MS-DOS
- Release: NA: April 1995; PAL: 1995
- Genre: Sports
- Modes: Single-player, multiplayer

Wayne Gretzky Hockey NHLPA All-Stars is an ice hockey video game featuring Wayne Gretzky and other NHLPA players. It was published by Time Warner Interactive for the Super NES, Mega Drive/Genesis, and MS-DOS.

== Gameplay ==
Players can play in exhibition mode, regular season mode, playoff mode, and even listen to stereotypical music of each nation in the sound test mode (country music for Canada, rock and roll music for Team USA, for example). In the Sega version, the players' names are formalized (Thomas instead of Tom, David instead of Dave, Steven instead of Steve, etc.).

Players can also have the CPU play some or all of their regular season, but the computer will lose more games than win them so it's important to play as many games as possible manually. In addition to American cities corresponding to real NHL teams, the player can also play as international teams (Sweden, Finland, Czechoslovakia, Russia, United States and Canada).

The game lacks the NHL license, meaning that teams are represented only by their corresponding city, rather than official name and logo. On default settings, teams do not feature their appropriate colors, but the game can be customized so that each team's uniforms resemble their NHL counterparts.

== Development ==
In late 1994, Time Warner Interactive signed hockey star Wayne Gretzky to a three-year deal for a line of signature video games. Wayne Gretzky and the NHLPA All-Stars was the first game to result from this deal, with Wayne Gretzky's 3D Hockey being the second. The original Genesis version was to be followed by versions for the SNES and PC. Cygnus Multimedia Productions, the company will go on to become Saffire, was hired to develop the SNES version of the game. An Atari Jaguar CD version was also in development and planned for a November 1995 release, but it was never published.

Producer Mitzi McGilvray of Time Warner Interactive recounted:

[In 1994] several of us at Time Warner thought about creating a new hockey title. We were fans of EA Sports' NHL games, but we thought we could make something better. So for a long time we just played all the available hockey games, coming up with ideas and thinking about who would work on such a project. After looking at lots of programmers and artists, I settled on a company called Semilogic Entertainment, which I'd worked with in the past. They loved hockey and were really enthusiastic. I met with every single person individually who would be working on the game because, as producer, you really need to know everyone personally. We didn't have a firm plan of what this new game was going to be - originally it was an international hockey game! We had lots of design meetings, and everyone on the project contributed ideas.

== Reception ==
Reception

Aggregate score
Aggregator	Score
GameRankings	66.83% (SNES); 65.83% (Genesis)

Slapshot McGraw of GamePro gave the Genesis version a rave review, praising the inclusion of fighting, the strong selection of teams, the "Just Play" option, and the general accessibility of the game, calling it "a terrific hockey game for both beginners and veterans." The two sports reviewers of Electronic Gaming Monthly gave it scores of 7.5 and 7 out of 10, variously praising the inclusion of fighting and the unique gameplay features, though one of the reviewers said he was "a bit disappointed by the overall performance of the game." Next Generation reviewed the Genesis version of the game, rating it three stars out of five, and stated that "This is an essentially different type of hockey game perfect for the younger gamer, but anyone looking for depth and simulation is advised to pass on this arcade-style effort."

Air Hendrix of GamePro gave the Super NES version a negative review, saying players can win just by repeated checking, with no need to use strategic plays or skillful footwork. He praised the graphics, noting the full motion video clips and large sprites, but said the animation is poor with sprites that "seem to float rather than skate". He summarized, "Fighting gamers may find momentary fun in this easy Wayne Gretzky cart, but hockey fans will shudder. Since both camps can find more satisfying action elsewhere, this mixed reaction earns Wayne a trip to the penalty box." A critic for Next Generation, while agreeing with Air Hendrix that the game is not a true hockey simulation, said that "it ain't bad" though "nothing special." Expressing the most pleasure with the comprehensive selection of modes and options, he gave it three out of five stars.
