= Boss Rally =

1999 video game

- Developer: Boss Game Studios
- Publisher: SouthPeak Interactive
- Platform: Microsoft Windows
- Release: NA: April 1999; EU: July 1999
- Genre: Racing
- Modes: Single-player, multiplayer

Boss Rally is a 1999 racing game developed by Boss Game Studios and published by SouthPeak Interactive for Microsoft Windows. It is essentially a port of the Nintendo 64 game Top Gear Rally, with extra features such as more cars and tracks and a multiplayer mode that supports up to eight players.

== Gameplay ==
Boss Rally is a racing game that comprises four gameplay modes: Championship, Time Attack, Quick Race, and a multiplayer mode. In Championship, a single player must progress through a series of seasons, with each season requiring the player to race against computer-controller opponents on multiple tracks. Points are awarded based on the position the player finishes a race, and if the required quantity is not met, the player will not qualify for the next season. As the player progresses through the Championship mode, new cars and tracks are unlocked. The game features a total of six tracks and 16 cars.

Time Attack and Quick Race are single-race challenges where the player must race against their best time and a computer-controlled opponent, respectively. The multiplayer mode supports LAN or null modem options. LAN allows up to eight players to compete against one another, while the null modem option is limited to two players only.

== Development and release ==
Boss Rally was developed by Boss Game Studios as a Microsoft Windows port of their Nintendo 64 game Top Gear Rally. Because Kemco owns the Top Gear license and Boss owns the game design, the game's title had to be changed. The game was not meant to compete with more elaborate racing games of the computer market, with the only technical improvement over its Nintendo 64 counterpart being a higher resolution. Boss Rally also features three more cars and an additional track. The soundtrack features music by a band named Dragline. The game was published by SouthPeak Interactive and first released in North America in April 1999. In the UK, Boss Rally was released in late July 1999.

== Reception ==
Reception

Aggregate score
Aggregator	Score
GameRankings	42%

Review scores
Publication	Score
AllGame	2.5/5
Computer and Video Games	1/5
GamePro	2/5
GameSpot	5/10
IGN	7.3/10
PC Gamer (UK)	63%
PC Zone	58%
Gamezilla!	40/100

Boss Rally received unfavorable reviews according to the review aggregation website GameRankings. PC Zone described the game as generic, stating that it does not offer anything new when compared to Colin McRae Rally, while GameSpot criticized the "nonexistent" artificial intelligence of computer-controlled opponents and the absence of internet support.
