= GT 64: Championship Edition =

1998 video game

- North American cover art
- Developer: Imagineer
- Publishers: EU: Infogrames United Kingdom; NA: Ocean of America (Note: EU and US releases released under the Ocean brand name.); JP: Imagineer
- Platform: Nintendo 64
- Release: NA: September 9, 1998; JP: October 30, 1998; EU: 1998
- Genre: Racing
- Modes: Single-player, multiplayer

GT 64: Championship Edition, known as City Tour GrandPrix: Zen Nihon GT Senshuken (CITY TOUR GRANDPRIX 〜全日本GT選手権〜) in Japan, is a racing video game developed by Imagineer and released for the Nintendo 64 console in 1998. It is an official licensed game to All-Japan GT Championship, featuring cars and drivers of the 1997 All Japan Grand Touring Car Championship.

== Gameplay ==
GT 64 is a racing game that features a ranking system comparable to Gran Turismo. Unlike the original version, which features tracks set in the US and Europe, the Japanese version features two new tracks set in Japan. The game supports the Rumble Pak.

== Development ==
GT 64 was developed by Imagineer.

== Reception ==
Reception

Aggregate score
Aggregator	Score
GameRankings	47%

Review scores
Publication	Score
Edge	5/10
Electronic Gaming Monthly	5.375/10
Famitsu	23/40
GamePro	3/5
GameSpot	5/10
Hyper	63%
IGN	3.9/10
N64 Magazine	67%
Next Generation	1/5
Nintendo Power	6.7/10

GT 64 received generally unfavorable reviews from critics, who criticized the game's limited number of tracks. N64 Magazine noted that, while the game had been touted as having 12 tracks, it actually only has three, without considering the mirror variants and the fact that each track offers both a short and a long route. The magazine concluded that GT 64 is inferior to Gran Turismo or GTI Club, but still more enjoyable than Automobili Lamborghini. Nintendo Power highlighted the game's energetic music and sound effects. Next Generation gave the game negative review, calling it as neither arcade nor simulation game. In Japan, Famitsu gave it a score of 23 out of 40.

== See also ==
- World Driver Championship
