= Super Ōzumō: Netsusen Daiichiban =

1992 video game

- Cover art
- Developer: Namcot
- Publisher: Namcot
- Composer: Hiromi Shibano
- Platform: Super Famicom
- Release: JP: December 18, 1992
- Genre: Sports (sumo)
- Modes: Single-player; Multiplayer

Super Ōzumō: Netsusen Daiichiban (スーパー大相撲 熱戦大一番; "Super Sumo of the Most Heated Competition") is a sumo video game developed and published by Namcot for the Super Famicom, which was released exclusively in Japan on December 18, 1992.

Famitsu gave it 26/40.

== See also ==
- List of sumo video games
