= Twisted Edge Extreme Snowboarding =

1998 video game

- Developer: Boss Game Studio
- Publishers: NA: Midway; EU: Kemco
- Composer: Zack Ohren
- Platform: Nintendo 64
- Release: NA: November 11, 1998; EU: March 12, 1999
- Genre: Sports (Snowboarding)
- Modes: Single-player, multiplayer

Twisted Edge Extreme Snowboarding (Note: Known in Japan as King Hill 64: Extreme Snowboarding (Japanese: キングヒル64 〜エクストリーム スノーボーディング〜, Hepburn: Kingu Hiru 64 〜Ekusutorīmu Sunōbōdingu〜)), released as Twisted Edge Snowboarding in Europe, is an extreme sports video game developed by Boss Game Studio and published by Midway in North America and by Kemco in Japan and Europe for the Nintendo 64.

The game was not very well received commercially or critically.

== Gameplay ==
The game has a two-player mode using a split screen.

== Development ==
Twisted Edge Snowboarding was announced on June 10, 1997, just as development on it was starting. Kemco was the publisher of the game in Europe, and Midway acquired the rights to publish the game in North America on October 15, 1997.

The game's design was heavily inspired by the Wave Race series. Much of the code for the game was recycled from Boss Game Studio's first Nintendo 64 game, Top Gear Rally. In particular, it used the same Alias plug-ins.

While Kemco was still the publisher, the company's Japanese division pushed for the game to include a story mode in the Japanese version, in part due to marketing research which determined that Wave Race 64 would have sold better in Japan if it had had a story. Boss Games took a tongue-in-cheek approach to adding story to the game, and opted to make the story mode an unlockable Easter egg in the U.S. version.

On January 22, 1998, the game was delayed for 4 months. The game was finally released on November 10, 1998 in the United States, followed by a Japanese release over a month later (December 18), before being ported to the PAL region and released on March 12, 1999.

== Reception ==
Reception

Aggregate score
Aggregator	Score
GameRankings	63%

Review scores
Publication	Score
Electronic Gaming Monthly	5.25/10
Game Informer	3.25/10
GamePro	4/5
GameSpot	6.6/10
Hyper	70%
IGN	6.8/10
N64 Magazine	60%
Nintendo Power	7.2/10

The game received "mixed" reviews according to the review aggregation website Metacritic.

Critics had mixed opinions about the game and called the game a huge letdown. Reviewers criticized Boss Game Studios for delaying the game for 4 months to make the game "as best as possible". By pushing back the title, 1080° Snowboarding was released before Twisted's delay, which sold more units and is now labeled a classic. According to reviewers, everything about the game was mediocre. The music was pleasurable, but the gameplay was frustrating and the graphics did not live up to the standards that 1080° Snowboarding had set.
