= Sumo Fighter: Tōkaidō Basho =

1991 video game

- Japanese cover art
- Developer: KID
- Publishers: JP: I'Max; NA: DTMC
- Composer: Nobuyuki Shioda
- Platform: Game Boy
- Release: JP: April 26, 1991; NA: March 1993
- Genres: Platform, beat 'em up, action-adventure
- Mode: Single-player

Sumo Fighter: Tōkaidō Basho (相撲ファイター 東海道場所; "Sumo Fighter Location Tōkaidō") (known in North America only as Sumo Fighter) is a 2D sumo-based action game, developed by KID and published by I'Max, which was released in 1991. In North America, the game was released by DTMC.

== Summary ==
The main character named Bontaro Heiseiyama goes to Kyoto to save Kayo. "Tōkaidō" is an eastern sea road, connecting Edo (modern-day Tokyo) to Kyoto, in Japan.

Screenshot showing the graphics.

The player can get experience and grow a sumo wrestler. Heiseiyama can perform four special techniques: harite, shiko, buchikamashi and nage. Harite is slapping the opponent's face with an open hand, Shiko creates quake and all the enemies will be damaged, Buchikamashi is charge and it is more powerful than Harite, however it isn't effective against all bosses. Nage is throwing. If the enemy is stopped by his Harite, he can throw.

Before starting the game, the player can choose the difficulty mode (level select): easy or hard. There are five areas, each area has three stages and a boss. In each area, the player has access once to a bonus stage. There are three kinds of bonus stages: Kamizumo, Yubizumo and Udezumo. Yubizumo is Thumbs Wrestling, Udezumo is like Arm Wrestling, and finally Kamizumo is Paper Sumo. When the player clears a stage, a password will be displayed.

After beating the game on hard mode, the player can play on a Super mode. In order to get all the ending text and credits, the game has to be finished in all the three difficulty levels. Each playthrough gets harder and the higher difficulties also pit the player against new enemies as well as giving bosses extra special moves.

The following is a message from the game producer for the players: "Even if you are good at this game, you can't grow as a sumo wrestler."

== See also ==
- List of sumo video games
- Glossary of sumo terms
- Tōkaidō (road)
- Tōkaidō (region)
