= NBA In The Zone '98 =

1998 basketball video game

- Developer: Konami Computer Entertainment Osaka
- Publisher: Konami
- Platforms: Nintendo 64, PlayStation
- Release: JP: January 29, 1998; NA: February 16, 1998; EU: April 1998
- Genre: Sports
- Modes: Single player, multiplayer

NBA In The Zone '98 (called NBA Pro 98 in Australia and Europe) is a basketball game for the Nintendo 64 and PlayStation. It was released in 1998 and developed and published by Konami. It is the third installment of the NBA In The Zone series. The cover features Glen Rice of the Charlotte Hornets.

The game has a "Create a Player" section and a season/playoffs section. All players in the game are based on stats and rosters of the 1996-1997 NBA season.

== Features ==
NBA In The Zone '98 had Glen Rice as its cover athlete. NBA In The Zone '98 used the 1997–98 NBA season rosters. Like with earlier In The Zone games, some players like Michael Jordan do not appear in the game but instead are replaced with likenesses and generic names. The game still features the "Create a Player" feature as well as season/playoffs as with NBA In The Zone 2. New features in this installment include on-the-fly play calling and team strategies.

The Nintendo 64 version supports the Rumble Pak.

== Reception ==
Reception

Aggregate score
Aggregator	Score	
Aggregator	N64	PS
GameRankings	52%	65%

Review scores
Publication	Score	
Publication	N64	PS
Edge	6/10	N/A
Electronic Gaming Monthly	4/10	7.25/10
Famitsu	27/40	26/40
Game Informer	4.75/10	8/10
GameFan	72%	40%
GameSpot	3.6/10	5.6/10
IGN	4.7/10	8/10
N64 Magazine	71%	N/A
Next Generation	1/5	N/A
Nintendo Power	6/10	N/A
Official U.S. PlayStation Magazine	N/A	2.5/5

Critical response to NBA in the Zone '98 dramatically differed between the two platforms it was released for. Reviews for the PlayStation version were lukewarm in tone, typically remarking that while it still has substantial problems, its gameplay is a significant improvement over that of its predecessor NBA In the Zone 2. GameSpot and the four reviewers of Electronic Gaming Monthly (EGM) particularly remarked that NBA in the Zone '98 made appreciable strides towards a more realistic game of basketball, with new gameplay features like on-court play calling and an overall more mature presentation. IGN praised the greater challenge in achieving alley-oops, and said NBA in the Zone '98 is still recommended only for those who want a less serious game of basketball than NBA Live 98. Many critics found it too easy to steal the ball or block shots. Kelly Rickards and Dan Hsu of EGM both felt that this flaw made the game merely average, while their co-reviewers Kraig Kujawa and John Ricciardi said it was an overall quality game with some rough edges. GameSpot concluded that while it was a good step in the right direction, it simply was not unique enough to stand out and was trumped in most respects by NBA Live 98.

The Nintendo 64 version, by contrast, was panned by critics. Reviews particularly criticized the extremely blurry graphics, which they attributed to a lackadaisical approach by Konami rather than to the differing capabilities of the two consoles. John Ricciardi wrote in EGM, "The PlayStation version (which was developed by a different team at Konami) looks a million times better than this, and there's just no excuse for that." IGN described it as the most blurry graphics on the Nintendo 64 to date, and also commented that "the game is simply boring. It's generic, formula-basketball, with no thrills, no spills and no real excitement." Reviews also criticized the Nintendo 64 version's cumbersome controls (particularly with switching players) and poor selection of camera angles. GamePro concluded, "With such high hopes riding on this title, Zone '98 leaves hardcore sim gamers with nothing but a flat Spalding." Next Generation said that the game was "the only five-on-five hoops game currently available for N64, but even hardcore basketball fans should take this occasion to remember that patience is a virtue and wait for something better."

On the review aggregation website GameRankings, the Playstation version held a 65% at the time of the site's 2019 closure, while the Nintendo 64 version held a 52%.
