= Waka Taka Ōzumō: Brothers Dream Match =

1993 video game

- Cover art
- Developer: Tomcat System
- Publisher: Imagineer
- Composers: Takane Ōkubo; Takako Ono
- Platform: Super Famicom
- Release: JP: November 12, 1993
- Genre: Sports sumo
- Modes: Single-player; Multiplayer

Waka Taka Ōzumō: Brothers Dream Match (若貴大相撲 夢の兄弟対決, Waka Taka Ōzumō: Yume no Kyōdai Taiketsu) is a sumo video game developed by Tomcat System and published by Imagineer for the Super Famicom, which was released exclusively in Japan in 1993.

== Reception ==
On release, Famicom Tsūshin scored the game a 20 out of 40.

== See also ==
- List of sumo video games
- Wakanohana Masaru
- Takanohana Kōji
