= Chameleon Twist =

1997 video game

- North American box art
- Developer: Japan System Supply
- Publishers: JP: Japan System Supply; WW: Sunsoft
- Director: Masaki Kimura
- Producer: Taeko Nagata
- Designer: Hideyuki Nakanishi
- Programmers: Hideyuki Nakanishi; Masataka Imura; Takashi Isugioka; Masaki Kimura; Masaomi Ishimoto
- Composers: Takashi Sugioka; Takashi Makino; Yuuji Nakao; Nobutoshi Ichimiya; Koki Tochio; Tsutomu Washijima; Hiroshi Takami; Fumihiko Yamada
- Platform: Nintendo 64
- Release: NA: December 9, 1997; JP: December 12, 1997; EU: December 1997
- Genre: Platform
- Modes: Single-player, multiplayer

Chameleon Twist (Note: Chameleon Twist (カメレオンツイスト, Kamereon Tsuisuto)) is a 1997 video game developed by Japan System Supply, published by Japan System Supply in Japan, and published by Sunsoft in North America and Europe for the Nintendo 64.

Though disliked by critics due to its easy gameplay, repetitive music, and awkward camera angles, Chameleon Twist was followed by a sequel titled Chameleon Twist 2.

This 3D platform game has players take on the role of one of four anthropomorphic chameleons, and travel across six themed worlds. The chameleon's elongated tongue can be used as a weapon, a means to traverse gaps, or as a way to leap onto platforms. Once the tongue is unrolled, it can be guided in any direction using the analog stick. A five-room training area lets players practice the controls. The single-player game involves progressing through predominately indoor environments, each culminating in a boss battle, while collecting hearts to replenish health.

== Story ==
The protagonist of the game is a blue chameleon named Davy who, upon following a rabbit (closely resembling the White Rabbit from Lewis Carroll's Alice in Wonderland) into a magical hole in the ground, finds he has taken on a humanoid form.

The plot involves Davy or one of his friends, Jack, Fred, or Linda, traveling throughout the six lands of the magic portal he enters, in an attempt to find a way back through the portal and back home, following the same rabbit he met before he entered the world.

== Gameplay ==
A primary facet of the game is controlling the movement and direction of the chameleon character's tongue. This enables players to obtain power-ups from a distance or to swallow enemies. The tongue will extend until it reaches its full length and retracts back into the chameleon's mouth, or until it bumps a wall, which yields the same result. As a basic attack, Davy and his friends, who have the same powers, can stick out their tongue and swallow enemies that stick to it. Once inside their mouth, the Chameleons have the option of spitting the enemies back out of their mouths at other enemies. In order to jump up to levels of ground that are usually impossible to reach, the characters are able to launch themselves into the air by using their tongues. If used while the chameleon is moving in a particular direction, the jump is given even more altitude, in what is comparable to pole vaulting. Similarly, the chameleons' tongues can be wrapped around poles, allowing them to cross gaps by either pulling themselves towards the pole or rotate around it while maintaining their distance.

A multiplayer "battle mode" is also playable separate from the main game, allowing two to four players the chance to take part in either a Battle Royal or Time Trial event. Battle Royal has players vying to be the last chameleon left standing on a suspended platform, while Time Trial rewards the chameleon that stays on the platform the longest. In the latter event, the chameleon that has fallen off the fewest times is considered the winner. Options include four difficulty settings for multiplayer games, adjustable battle lengths, and a choice of four stages for both the Battle Royal and Time Trial modes.

== Release ==
The game was originally only planned for release in Japan, but Sunsoft and Nintendo thought children in the U.S. would enjoy the title.

== Reception ==
Reception

Aggregate score
Aggregator	Score
GameRankings	59%

Review scores
Publication	Score
AllGame	3/5
Electronic Gaming Monthly	6.25/10
Famitsu	28/40
Game Informer	7/10
GameSpot	5.1/10
IGN	6.5/10
N64 Magazine	70%
Nintendo Power	5.9/10

Chameleon Twist received mixed reviews, with common criticisms being awkward camera angles which can cause the player to make mistakes, the short length, and the low difficulty. Some critics noted in its defense that the game was clearly targeted towards young children. GameSpot, for instance, concluded that "it's not outwardly offensive in any way; it's just obviously aimed at a young audience. Really, it's a pretty innocuous little game and probably worth a rental if you have an itch for another 3D N64 platformer. You won't likely entertain any thoughts of buying it afterwards, except possibly as a present for a younger relative. Kids though, they'll eat it up." Sushi-X of Electronic Gaming Monthly (EGM) likewise commented, "Obviously, Chameleon Twist is aimed at beginners, and with that in mind, I can see the appeal of the overly cute graphics and sickeningly sweet background tunes." The music was almost universally criticized as being overly saccharine and repetitive.

EGM and GameSpot both also criticized the game as being wholly lacking in originality. GamePro, which gave one of the more positive reviews for Chameleon Twist, acknowledged that it is "straight-forward hop-n-bop stuff" and has issues with the graphics and audio, but argued that it has underlying entertainment value and even challenge. Contrarily, Nintendo Power said the game has innovative mechanics and puzzles, but the novelty of the innovations wears off and the game ultimately becomes frustrating and dull. Peer Schneider similarly wrote in IGN, "While I liked some of the original touches and moves (the whole tongue thing is cool), the ugly graphics and sound, useless multiplayer mode and short quest keep me from recommending the game."

GameSpot and Sushi-X of EGM joined Schneider in describing the multiplayer modes as so unexciting as to be worthless, but GamePro and Sushi-X's co-reviewer John Ricciardi described the Battle Royale mode as a highlight.

The game held a score of 59% on the review aggregation website GameRankings based on eight reviews. In Japan, Famitsu gave it a score of 28 out of 40.
