= Boss Game Studios =

American video game developer (1994–2002)

- Company type: Private
- Industry: Video games
- Founded: c. 1994
- Defunct: June 14, 2002; 24 years ago
- Headquarters: Redmond, Washington, United States
- Number of employees: 40 (2001)
- Website: Archived

Boss Game Studios was an American video game developer based in Redmond, Washington. The company was founded in 1994 and closed in 2002. It specialized in Nintendo 64 racing games with releases such as Top Gear Rally and World Driver Championship.

== History ==
Boss Game Studios was formed in Redmond, Washington as an independent offshoot of Boss Film Studios, a company that created special effects for feature films. Some members of its creative and development team had contributed to games such as The Lion King and Dune II. Barry Leitch was the company's music director.

Following the release of their first game in 1997, Spider: The Video Game, the company specialized in Nintendo 64 racing games with releases such as Top Gear Rally and World Driver Championship. In 2000, the company was approached by Microsoft, who offered them an opportunity to develop games for their Xbox console. Boss Game Studios started work on an Xbox racing game, but were unable to find a publisher for the title. On June 14, 2002, the company disbanded.

== Games ==
- Spider: The Video Game (PlayStation) (1997)
- Top Gear Rally (Nintendo 64) (1997)
- Twisted Edge Extreme Snowboarding (Nintendo 64) (1998)
- Boss Rally (Windows) (1999)
- World Driver Championship (Nintendo 64) (1999)
- Stunt Racer 64 (Nintendo 64) (2000)

=== Unreleased ===
- 3D Tank (Virtual Boy)
- Kill Team (PlayStation, Sega Saturn, Windows)
