= World Driver Championship =

1999 video game

- North American box art
- Developer: Boss Game Studios
- Publisher: Midway
- Producer: Kevin Potter
- Designer: Brian McNeely
- Programmers: Brian Fehdrau; Rob Povey
- Artists: Todd Keller; Martin Sawkins
- Composer: Zack Ohren
- Platform: Nintendo 64
- Release: NA: June 15, 1999; EU: November 5, 1999
- Genre: Racing game
- Modes: Single-player, multiplayer

World Driver Championship is an automobile racing video game. It was developed by Boss Game Studios and published for the Nintendo 64 by Midway. It is notable for having especially high quality graphics.

== Gameplay ==
World Driver Championship is a racing game that features ten locations. Most locations feature six tracks (marked "A", "B", and "C"), three of which are in reverse (marked "R" next to "A", "B", and "C"). The exception is Black Forest, which has only four tracks, two of them being in reverse. These are the ten locations: Hawaii, United States; Les Gets, France; Las Vegas, United States; Auckland, New Zealand; Lisbon, Portugal; Rome, Italy; Sydney, Australia; Zürich, Switzerland; Kyoto, Japan; and the Black Forest in Germany. Not single real-life car manufacturer is featured in the game and there is no official licence of any real-life Rally tournament.

== Development ==
The game was showcased at E3 1999. One of the last racing simulations to be released for Nintendo 64, this graphically intensive title uses custom microcode optimization and high polygon count modelling. The development team was able to optimize the usage of the various processors within the N64 to allow a great draw distance (reducing the need for fog or pop-up), highly detailed texturing and models, Doppler effect MP3 audio, and advanced lighting and fog effects for realistic weather conditions. Additionally, unlike many other games of its type on the platform, the game runs high resolution at a smooth pace.

The soundtrack, consisting of original rock and heavy metal tunes, was composed by musician Zack Ohren.

== Reception ==
Reception

Aggregate score
Aggregator	Score
Metacritic	75/100

Review scores
Publication	Score
AllGame	4/5
Edge	6/10
Electronic Gaming Monthly	7.25/10
GameSpot	5.7/10
IGN	8.8/10
N64 Magazine	91%
Next Generation	4/5
Nintendo Power	8.7/10

Although World Driver Championship received generally positive reviews from critics, it suffered from intense competition at the time. While the game was an improvement in nearly every way compared to Boss's similar earlier effort, Top Gear Rally, it was up against the impressive new Gran Turismo series and other new racers. Complaints included a somewhat unconvincing driving physics model, non-licensed cars, and poor sound effects and music quality. The dislike for the physics model often stems from the beginning cars being difficult to drive and offering a "sloppy" feeling of control. Next Generation praised the graphics, gameplay, cars, and tracks, but noted that due to its driving physics model the game will be difficult to master for arcade racing fans.
