= Sumotori Dreams =

2007 video game

Sumotori Dreams Classic
- Developer: Peter Soltesz
- Publishers: Peter Soltesz, Gravitysensation
- Platform: Windows
- Release: April 2007 (Windows); March 20, 2014 (iOS, Android)
- Genre: Sports video game
- Modes: Single-player, multiplayer

Sumotori Dreams is an indie sumo video game that was developed by Peter Soltesz and released for Windows in April 2007. It was released for iOS and Android on March 20, 2014, and saw a much later Steam release on May 3, 2021, published by Gravitysensation. The game revolves around a humorous ragdoll physics-based simulation of wrestling in which multiple players control awkward, humanoid dummy-like characters who attempt to push each other out of a sumo ring, then attempt to bow after the match is completed. It was positively received by critics for its gameplay, but its extremely basic graphics and lack of content were noted as negatives. The game also served as a tech demo for procedural animation, and was called impressive for its extremely small file size of 96kb.

== Reception ==
Kieron Gillen of Rock Paper Shotgun wrote that Sumotori Dreams "made me laugh harder than any game this year. Including Portal." He added that he was "reduced to a sobbing wreck at its irresistible, dumb-arsed, brain-damaged majesty". Describing the fighting as similar to if a dog's mind had been transferred into a human's body and had to make sense of its new appendages, he noted the attempts to stand up and bow as additional sources of humor. He praised the game for "deconstructing" the idea of a fighting game, noting its relative lack of complexity compared to others in the genre, and further positing that "for all its lack of pretense, it's a more accurate simulation of most fighting in the world" due to its flailing awkwardness.

Craig Pearson of GamesRadar+ also praised the game for its "stupidly fun slapstick", saying that its potential had been "brilliantly realized", but its "ultra-simple graphics" and lack of content were seen as points of contention. In 2008, PC Zone called the game one of the 50 best freeware games, saying that it had "the most laughs per kilobyte". Retro Gamer positively rated the game, describing its animation as "farcical, fluid and disturbingly natural". Mike Wehner of Engadget reviewed the game's iOS version positively, though describing it as "a bit buggy". However, Chris Priestman described the mobile version as much more limited than the PC one, noting its lack of arenas or mods.

Steve Theodore wrote about the game's impressive animation technology in Game Developer, describing it as the "future of animation" due to its entirely physics-based movements that did not rely on animators or motion capture, something made even more "remarkable" by its 96kb file size.
