= Stunt Racer 64 =

2000 video game

- Developer(s): Boss Game Studios
- Publisher(s): Midway
- Producer(s): Kevin Potter
- Programmer(s): Chris Pink
- Composer(s): Devin Hurd
- Platform(s): Nintendo 64
- Release: NA: October 3, 2000
- Genre(s): Racing
- Mode(s): Single-player, multiplayer

Stunt Racer 64 is a 2000 racing game developed by Boss Studios and published by Midway for Nintendo 64. The player can control one of four different retro cars in order to drive through various futuristic locales.

== Gameplay ==
Set in an unspecified time in the future, vehicles are retrofitted with futuristic engine and turbo technology, in addition to jets mounted to allow the cars to perform midair stunts. These stunts, including flips and barrel rolls, enable the player to accumulate cash rewards during races on levitating tracks. The money earned can be used to purchase new cars as well as upgraded parts for existing vehicles.

=== Game modes ===
- Contest Mode - One player selects one of four characters, each with unique cars. Players then compete in races against a full tournament featuring dozens of AI-controlled opponents. Although the character biographies suggest that the computer characters possess distinct racing personalities, there is no direct interaction with them, and they serve no significant purpose in gameplay. For each heat, a certain number of points is awarded based on the player's finishing position. To advance, the player must achieve a high enough total score. Placing first in a race allows the player to keep all money earned; second place allows them to retain half of the money earned, while no money is kept for placements 3–6. There are five leagues to race through, each presenting an increasing level of difficulty, more opponents with superior vehicles, additional rounds, and more tracks. Upon achieving a first-place overall finish, the player races one-on-one against the league owner for the prize of the league owner's car. The leagues, in order of increasing difficulty, are:
  - Kid Cola's League
  - Bunny's League
  - Hill Bully's League
  - Big John's League
  - Dr. Death's League

(Note: The player must complete the game on Normal or Hard difficulty to access Dr. Death's League.) Replay is available to view after every race in Contest Mode.

- Quick Race - One to four players can compete in an arcade-style race where the cash prizes do not accumulate above $1,000. When a player reaches $1,000 or more, each $1,000 is automatically converted into a Turbo that can be used at any time to increase speed. The cars available (and their upgrade status) depend on the last game save loaded in Contest Mode. The two main modes of Quick Race are Single Race (with optional computer opponents) and Practice (with no computer opponents). The two stunt tracks, Half Pipe and Stunt Bowl, are accessible only in Quick Race. Replay is not available to view after every race in Quick Race mode, except for Stunt Bowl and Half Pipe.

A race on the Soda Mountain track.

=== Cars ===
When a career is first started in Contest Mode, the player selects one of four starter characters, each with their own car: Warbird Light, Z-Bucket, Stottlemeyer, and Del Raye. Cash prizes can later be used to purchase the rest of these starter cars if desired, along with other cars that are available for purchase only. Among these cars, once they reach full upgrade, a fancier version of each car becomes available for sale. These "upgraded" cars cannot have their parts upgraded, nor can the cars earned from league owners.

== Development ==
Stunt Racer 64 was originally planned for retail release, including in Europe, but these plans were canceled due to missed deadlines.

== Reception ==
Reception

Aggregate score
Aggregator	Score
GameRankings	72.50%

Review scores
Publication	Score
IGN	7/10
Nintendo Power	7.5/10
