= Onita Atsushi FMW =

1993 video game

- Cover art featuring Atsushi Onita and Megumi Kudo
- Developer: Marionette
- Publisher: Pony Canyon
- Designer: Yoshiro Akata
- Composer: Takeshi Yasuda
- Platform: Super Famicom
- Release: JP: August 6, 1993
- Genre: Wrestling
- Modes: Single-player, multiplayer

Onita Atsushi FMW (大仁田厚 FMW) is a wrestling video game for Super Famicom. It was released on August 6, 1993, to an exclusively Japanese audience with an endorsement by Japanese professional wrestler Atsushi Onita.

The player has to fight their way through a fictionalized version of the Frontier Martial-Arts Wrestling organization; the wrestling promotion Onita owned, booked and was the star of throughout the 1990s, portrayed in this game to be more of a tournament of the Street Fighter variety than a realistic wrestling company. According to the official slogan of the game, it was considered to incorporate an entire batch of innovative ideas. The instruction manual for the game talked about the virtual pursuit of achieving the total potential of each wrestler.

== Gameplay ==
The game is essentially a professional wrestling-style video game that was remade into more of a "tournament" fighter. Each fight is a "death match" and seven of these must be fought in order to be crowned the champion. While this game feels like a Street Fighter II clone with a wrestling theme, it manages to capture the spirit of having the fighter with the best 2-out-of-3 rounds win the fight.

Players can use land mines that are the replicas used by the Imperial Japanese Army during the Second World War; these mines can blow a rock into pieces of dirt that fly up to 200 miles or 320 kilometres away from the blast site. However, stepping on these land mines costs players a lot of their energy; re-enacting the hardcore matches of the FMW promotion in addition to Onita's typical matches.

Each character has a gauge based on his spiritual strength (soul), physical strength (root), and mental strength (mind). The spirit of the player's characters can be recharged by getting the character to yell at the opponent.

== See also ==
- List of licensed wrestling video games
