= Wayne Gretzky's 3D Hockey '98 =

1997 video game

The NHL & NHLPA Present Wayne Gretzky's 3D Hockey '98
- European Nintendo 64 cover art
- Developer: Software Creations
- Publisher: Midway
- Platforms: Nintendo 64, PlayStation
- Release: NA: December 3, 1997; EU: June 1, 1998
- Genre: Sports
- Modes: Single player, multiplayer

Wayne Gretzky's 3D Hockey '98 is an ice hockey game for the Nintendo 64 and PlayStation, released in 1997. The game is endorsed by hockey star Wayne Gretzky, and is the sequel to Wayne Gretzky's 3D Hockey. A successor game, Olympic Hockey '98, was released in 1998.

The game gained widespread criticism for its lack of changes from the original Wayne Gretzky's 3D Hockey; while the gameplay was tweaked and the A.I. was made tougher, the graphics, music, and sound effects were largely recycled from the original game.

== Reception ==
Reception

Aggregate score
Aggregator	Score
GameRankings	62% (N64)

Review scores
Publication	Score
Electronic Gaming Monthly	7/10 (N64)
Game Informer	7.75/10 (N64)
GameFan	83% (N64)
Hyper	68% (PS1)
IGN	5.8/10 (N64)
N64 Magazine	70% (N64)
Next Generation	2/5 (N64)

The game received generally mediocre reviews. While most critics still liked the series' fast, unrealistic gameplay, they also overwhelmingly complained that the '98 installment was largely unchanged from the original Wayne Gretzky's 3D Hockey. Kraig Kujawa, for example, wrote in Electronic Gaming Monthly that "I don't think that the adjustments they made warrant buying this game if you have last year's version." Next Generation stated that "last year's hit is this year's deja vu - don't be sucked in by Midway's hype. If you own the original, there's nothing in the update that justifies a purchase." GamePro was more positive, saying that the recycled elements still hold up, but still advised that players who already owned the original game should rent the '98 edition before deciding whether to buy it. N64.com (later renamed IGN) concluded, "Last year, N64.com gave the original Wayne Gretzky 3D Hockey a rating of 8, and it deserves every single point. Does that mean that this year's version, arguably the same title brought out one year later, deserves the same score? Absolutely not. We don't recommend that you go out and spend the $60 to get a duplicate of a game you already own."

Critics had sharply differing opinions about the new A.I. While some praised the tougher goalie A.I. as the strongest improvement in an otherwise unchanged game, others complained that the new goalies are virtually infallible, and that the A.I. improvement in the other players is negligible.
