= 64 Ōzumō =

1997 video game

- Developer: Bottom Up
- Publisher: Bottom Up
- Producer: Shigeru Okamoto
- Programmers: Satoshi Yoshikawa; Masahiko Takahashi; Mitsuhiro Nishide
- Composers: Minako Adachi; Takuya Yokota
- Platform: Nintendo 64
- Release: JP: November 28, 1997
- Genres: Sports, Fighting
- Modes: Single-player, multiplayer

64 Ōzumō (Note: Japanese: 64大相撲, Hepburn: Rokujūyon Ōzumō; lit. '64 Professional Sumo Wrestling') is a sumo wrestling simulation video game for the Nintendo 64 released in Japan on November 28, 1997. A sequel, 64 Ōzumō 2, was released on March 19, 1999.

== Gameplay ==
The gameplay simulates various aspects of a sumo wrestler's life, such as diets and training, and matches.

== Reception ==
Ryan MacDonald of GameSpot gave the game a 3.9 out of 10, calling the graphics "mediocre at best" and the game likely to appeal only to "die-hard sumo fans."

== See also ==
- List of sumo video games
