= Olympic Hockey '98 =

1998 ice hockey video game

- North American cover art
- Developer: Treyarch Invention
- Publishers: NA: Midway; EU: GT Interactive; JP: Konami
- Platform: Nintendo 64
- Release: NA: February 23, 1998; EU: April 1998; JP: July 16, 1998
- Genre: Sports
- Modes: Single-player, multiplayer

Olympic Hockey '98 is an ice hockey game for the Nintendo 64 that was released in 1998. It is a re-skin of Wayne Gretzky's 3D Hockey '98, but this time not endorsed by Wayne Gretzky and featuring the license for the 1998 Winter Olympics that were celebrated in Nagano, Japan. It was the video game developer debut of Treyarch. Besides the box art, in-game titles, and some minor graphic changes (such as team logos and colors), every single aspect of the game is practically identical to Wayne Gretzky's 3D Hockey '98. Due to this fact, it received highly negative reviews, with IGN rating Olympic Hockey Nagano '98 a zero.

== Gameplay ==
Olympic Hockey '98 features 20 playable national teams from the 1998 Winter Olympics: Austria, Belarus, Canada, Czech Republic, Denmark, Finland, France, Germany, Great Britain, Italy, Japan, Kazakhstan, Netherlands, Norway, Poland, Russia, Slovakia, Sweden, Switzerland, and the United States.

While the gameplay is very similar to Wayne Gretzky's 3D Hockey, there are minor differences. The rink is bigger than the rink in the previous game (since it is Olympic sized). The game also lists the names of the players below the players.

== Release ==
In Japan, the game was localized and published by Konami under the name Olympic Hockey Nagano '98 (オリンピック ホッキー NAGANO98(ナガノ98), Orinpikku Hakkī Nagano 98) on July 16, 1998.

== Reception ==
Reception

Aggregate score
Aggregator	Score
GameRankings	44%

Review scores
Publication	Score
AllGame	3/5
Electronic Gaming Monthly	5/10, 5/10, 5.5/10, 3/10
Famitsu	24/40
Game Informer	4/10
GameSpot	5/10
IGN	0/10
N64 Magazine	60%
Next Generation	1/5
Nintendo Power	6.5/10

Olympic Hockey '98 was panned by critics for being essentially a rebranding of Wayne Gretzky's 3D Hockey '98, which had itself been widely criticized for offering too little improvement over the original Wayne Gretzky's 3D Hockey. All four members of the Electronic Gaming Monthly review team decried its lack of change from the two Gretzky games, with John Ricciardi being particularly vehement: "This kind of shameless rehashing of the same game over and over makes me sick. Did you buy Wayne Gretzky's 3D Hockey or its incredibly unoriginal sequel with the '98 slapped on the box? If so, stay away from this baby, 'cause it's (once again) the same game." IGN gave it a very rare 0 score, stating in its concise review: "We'll post a new review when Midway releases a new game." Next Generation ran a similarly concise review, remarking, "Imagine Midway took the tired Gretzky engine, added Olympic uniforms, replaced trading with 'defections,' and released it without tweaking anything but the default ring size. Well, you don't have to imagine because Midway did it."

GamePro took a more positive angle on the game. While agreeing that it was virtually identical to Wayne Gretzky's 3D Hockey '98, they argued that it was reasonably distinct from the original Wayne Gretzky's 3D Hockey. Since the '98 game was recent enough that many interested players would not yet have bought it, they reasoned that Olympic Hockey '98 was a worthwhile alternative for those who preferred Olympic hockey to the NHL rosters. Nintendo Power was also relatively positive, praising the simulation feel of the Olympic mode, but also commented that "Olympic Hockey is so similar in most respects to the Gretzky games that Gretzky owners should think twice before making the investment." In his review for GameSpot, Kraig Kujawa acknowledged that if one ignored the two Gretzky games and judged Olympic Hockey '98 on its own terms, it was a decent game, but argued that any rating for the game had to also take into account its lack of change from those games, especially since Midway could easily have put both NHL and Olympic teams into one game, effectively making Wayne Gretzky's 3D Hockey '98 and Olympic Hockey '98 a single release. The game held a 44% on the review aggregation website GameRankings based on six reviews.
