= MRC: Multi-Racing Championship =

1997 video game

Multi Racing Championship
- North American cover art
- Developer(s): Genki
- Publisher(s): JP: Imagineer; WW: Ocean
- Platform(s): Nintendo 64
- Release: JP: July 18, 1997; NA: September 4, 1997; EU: October 1997
- Genre(s): Racing
- Mode(s): Single-player, multiplayer

MRC: Multi-Racing Championship (Note: Also known as simply Multi Racing Championship (Note: Japanese: マルチレーシングチャンピオンシップ, Hepburn: Maruchi Rēshingu Chanpionshippu)) is a racing video game developed by Genki and released for the Nintendo 64 in 1997. It was published in North America and Europe by Ocean and in Japan by Imagineer. The game is compatible with the Controller Pak and the Rumble Pak.

== Gameplay ==
In Championship mode, the player competes against nine computer-controlled racers. Finishing first advances the game. In Time Trial mode, players try to finish a course in as short a time as possible. Ghost car is included so the player can compete against the best time recorded. Free Run mode lets the player drive freely without other opponents or time limit. The VS Race mode lets two players compete against each other. The unlockable Match Race option pits the player against a hidden computer opponent in a night-time race. Weather effects like rain, fog and snow are included.

MRC features ten cars, which are divided into two groups: road cars and off-road vehicles. There are seven different areas for car customization: tires, brakes, suspension, steering, transmission, gear ratio, and aerodynamics. MRC includes three tracks: Sea Side, Mountain, and Downtown. The courses have multiple paths and mirror images can be unlocked.

== Development ==
The game was unveiled at the April 1997 Tokyo Game Show, where it drew large crowds despite publisher Imagineer having only a small booth.

It was the first game from an Infogrames subsidiary to be released on the Nintendo 64.

== Reception ==
Reception

Aggregate score
Aggregator	Score
GameRankings	67%

Review scores
Publication	Score
AllGame	2/5
Edge	7/10
Electronic Gaming Monthly	6.5/10, 6.5/10, 5.0/10, 6.5/10
Famitsu	26/40
Game Informer	8.25/10
GameFan	85% (Note: Three critics of GameFan gave the game each a score of 78, 89, and 88.)
GameSpot	4.1/10
Hyper	74%
IGN	6.4/10
N64 Magazine	(JP) 81% (EU) 71%
Next Generation	4/5

Multi Racing Championship held a 67% on the review aggregation website GameRankings based on 12 reviews. Critics liked that players could customize their car to suit different road conditions and the mixture of on-road and off-road racing, but felt the small number of tracks severely hurt the game's value. While most critics praised the controls, GameSpot found the realistic handling forces the player to slow down too much, concluding that MRC doesn't have the illusion of speed, and making gameplay as dull. Matt Casamassina of IGN described MRC as decent average racer game. Edge highlighted the realistic handling of the cars, which varies depending on the road surface material. The magazine criticized the game's short length, but admitted that the two-player mode gives the game some longevity.

Most critics also said the graphics overall were solid but failed to actually impress, and found the announcer annoying. GamePro argued that despite the game's flaws, it is worth checking out because it was thus far the Nintendo 64's only real alternative to the critically panned Cruis'n USA. (Note: GamePro gave the game 4.0/5 for graphics, 4.0/5 for fun factor, 3.0/5 for sound, and 4.5/5 for control.) However, GameSpot and IGN both pointed out that Top Gear Rally and San Francisco Rush would both be out soon and looked more promising than MRC. Three of Electronic Gaming Monthly's four reviewers also felt MRC was not as good as the rest of the racing games arriving on the Nintendo 64 in late 1997, and echoed IGN's assessment of the game as distinctly average. In contrast, Next Generation lauded its "wonderful graphical complexity", also praising realism and physics model and considering the game as a respectable rival to Sega racing games.
