= Chameleon Twist 2 =

1998 video game

- European box art
- Developer: Japan System Supply
- Publishers: JP: Japan System Supply; WW: Sunsoft
- Composer: Koichi Fujiwara
- Platform: Nintendo 64
- Release: JP: December 25, 1998; NA: April 14, 1999; PAL: 1999
- Genre: Platformer
- Mode: Single player

Chameleon Twist 2 (Note: Chameleon Twist 2 (カメレオンツイスト2, Kamereon Tsuisuto Tsu)) is a 1998 platform game developed by Japan System Supply, published by Japan System Supply in Japan, and published by Sunsoft in North America and Europe for the Nintendo 64. It is the sequel to Chameleon Twist.

== Story ==
The story of Chameleon Twist 2 takes place after the events in Chameleon Twist. Davy and his friends (Jack, Fred, and Linda) are playing in the forest, still carrying the backpack from his last adventure, when suddenly the rabbit (closely resembling Lewis Carroll's White Rabbit) from before falls down and knocks one of the chameleons into the sky. The chameleon transforms into an enhanced-looking humanoid chameleon and goes on a search for six carrots in six different worlds.

== Gameplay ==
The game changed certain aspects of the original, such as the character designs and the switched colors of the main characters. New moves were added, such as a parachute that could be deployed to make a slow descent and that could be used in conjunction with the tongue. Moreover, vertical pole swings were added, rather than having only horizontal.

The player may talk to the rabbit whenever it is encountered. The rabbit would ask them if they wanted to go to a practice course, and they could either accept or decline. If they declined, the rabbit would fly away and the player would not be able to visit that bonus course anytime again in the game.

The worlds are much longer than those of the first. However, there is no longer a multiplayer mode. The player characters' designs are also substantially altered in the international release, with more realistic chameleon heads.

== Reception ==
Reception

Aggregate score
Aggregator	Score
GameRankings	49%

Review scores
Publication	Score
AllGame	2.5/5
Electronic Gaming Monthly	3.75/10
Famitsu	24/40
Game Informer	6.5/10
GameSpot	4/10
Hyper	60%
IGN	6.1/10
N64 Magazine	55%
Nintendo Power	6.6/10
Official Nintendo Magazine	67%

The game received "unfavorable" reviews according to the review aggregation website GameRankings. In Japan, Famitsu gave it a score of 24 out of 40. Nintendo Power gave it an average review nearly two months before its U.S. release date.

Official Nintendo Magazine claimed Chameleon Twist 2 was better than its predecessor, in terms of gameplay and its colorful visuals, but was too short and could be completed within a day. It found the music "annoying" and criticized the scarce sound effects.
