= NBA In The Zone '99 =

1999 basketball video game

- Developer: Konami Computer Entertainment Osaka
- Publisher: Konami
- Platforms: Nintendo 64, PlayStation
- Release: NA: April 8, 1999; JP: June 3, 1999; EU: 1999
- Genre: Sports
- Modes: Single-player, multiplayer

NBA In The Zone '99, known in Europe as NBA Pro 99, is a basketball game for the Nintendo 64 and PlayStation, released in 1999. It is the fourth installment of the NBA In The Zone series. The game has two covers of NBA All-Star Glen Rice, (one of him with the Charlotte Hornets, and the other of him with the Los Angeles Lakers).

== Gameplay ==
NBA In The Zone '99 features updated rosters from the 1998–99 NBA season.

== Reception ==
Reception

Aggregate score
Aggregator	Score	
Aggregator	N64	PS
GameRankings	66%	69%

Review scores
Publication	Score	
Publication	N64	PS
Electronic Gaming Monthly	6.5/10 (Note: In Electronic Gaming Monthly's review, two critics gave the Nintendo 64 version a 6.5/10, one a 7/10, and another a 6/10.)	7.75/10
Famitsu	22/40	27/40
Game Informer	4/10	6/10
GameFan	54% (Note: In GameFan's early review of the Nintendo 64 version, one critic gave it 58, and the other 50.)	N/A
GamePro	3/5 (Note: GamePro gave the Nintendo 64 version three 3/5 scores for graphics, sound, and overall fun factor, and 2.5/5 for control.)	3.5/5
GameSpot	5.5/10	4.7/10
IGN	5.6/10	8.3/10
N64 Magazine	52%	N/A
Next Generation	N/A	2/5
Nintendo Power	6.9/10	N/A
Official U.S. PlayStation Magazine	N/A	3.5/5

The game received average reviews on both platforms according to the review aggregation website GameRankings. Next Generation said of the PlayStation version, "Once considered the pinnacle of NBA hoops games, In the Zone 99 [sic] appears to be a mere shadow of its one-time glory." In Japan, where the game was ported for release on June 3, 1999, with the Nintendo 64 version under the name of NBA In The Zone 2, and the PlayStation version under the name of NBA Power Dunkers 4 (NBAパワーダンカーズ4, NBA Pawā Dankāzu 4), Famitsu gave it a score of 27 out of 40 for the latter, and 22 out of 40 for the former.
