= NBA In The Zone 2000 =

2000 video game

- Developer: Konami Computer Entertainment Osaka
- Publisher: Konami
- Platforms: Nintendo 64, PlayStation, Game Boy Color
- Release: JP: January 27, 2000 (PS); NA: February 18, 2000; EU: May 2000; Game Boy Color: NA: April 27, 2000; EU: September 29, 2000
- Genre: Sports
- Modes: Single player, multiplayer

NBA In The Zone 2000 is a basketball video game released for the Nintendo 64, PlayStation, and Game Boy Color in 2000. It is the fifth and final installment of the NBA In The Zone series. The cover features Marcus Camby of the New York Knicks.

== Gameplay ==
Players can play as any of the 29 NBA teams from the 1999–2000 NBA season, which feature more than 300 actual players in motion-captured animation, featuring play-by-play from NBA announcer Red Clay, and standard gameplay modes like Exhibition, Season, and Playoffs, a Slam Dunk Contest and Three-Point Shootout.

== Reception ==
Reception

Aggregate score
Aggregator	Score		
Aggregator	GBC	N64	PS
GameRankings	N/A	47%	45%

Review scores
Publication	Score		
Publication	GBC	N64	PS
Electronic Gaming Monthly	N/A	5/10	5.5/10 (Note: In Electronic Gaming Monthly's early review of the PlayStation version, one critic gave it 5/10, two others gave it each a score of 5.5/10, and another gave it 6/10.)
Famitsu	N/A	N/A	27/40
Game Informer	N/A	5.5/10	6.5/10
GameFan	N/A	65% (Note: In GameFan's early viewpoint of the Nintendo 64 version, one critic gave it 70, and the other 60.) (L.B.) 55%	N/A
IGN	5/10	5.8/10	4.5/10
N64 Magazine	N/A	69%	N/A
Next Generation	N/A	1/5	N/A
Nintendo Power	N/A	6.2/10	N/A
PlayStation Official Magazine – UK	N/A	N/A	5/10
PlayStation: The Official Magazine	N/A	N/A	2.5/5

The Nintendo 64 and PlayStation versions received unfavorable reviews according to the review aggregation website GameRankings. Electronic Gaming Monthly, Game Informer, GameFan and Nintendo Power gave the game mixed reviews, months before the game was released Stateside. Rob Smolka of NextGen called the same N64 version "a travesty of a basketball game" that "manages to eke out a score of one star only because our rating system doesn't go any lower." In Japan, where the PlayStation version was released first under the name of NBA Power Dunkers 5 (NBAパワーダンカーズ5, NBA Pawā Dankāzu 5) on January 27, 2000, Famitsu gave it a score of 27 out of 40.
