= Wayne Gretzky's 3D Hockey =

1996 video game

- Arcade flyer
- Developer: Atari Games
- Publishers: Arcade; Atari Games; Nintendo 64; Midway Home Entertainment
- Producer: Robert Daly
- Composers: John Paul; Doug Brandon; Jonathan Hey
- Platforms: Arcade, Nintendo 64
- Release: Arcade: NA: October 1996; Nintendo 64: NA: November 15, 1996; EU: March 1, 1997; JP: February 28, 1998
- Genre: Sports
- Modes: Single player, multiplayer

Wayne Gretzky's 3D Hockey is a 1996 ice hockey video game developed and published by Atari Games for arcades. A port for the Nintendo 64 was released a month after the arcade version, making it the first-ever four-player game for the Nintendo 64. The game was followed by Wayne Gretzky's 3D Hockey '98 in 1997.

== Gameplay ==
As opposed to the more realistic ice hockey simulation gameplay seen in Electronic Arts' NHL series, Wayne Gretzky's 3D Hockey features arcade-style gameplay, with moves such as "power saves", which cause the goaltender to briefly transform into a brick wall, "power shots", which set the net on fire or knock the goalie into the net, and "power checks", which send an ambulance across the top of the screen. It features high-scoring games and over-the-top fights. There is also a simulation mode for those looking for more realistic gameplay. The game allowed the creation of profiles and would keep track of important individual and team stats, including goals, assists, and wins, among others.

== Development ==
Wayne Gretzky's 3D Hockey was the second game to result from a three-year deal for a line of signature video games featuring hockey star Wayne Gretzky, the first being Wayne Gretzky and the NHLPA All-Stars.

The skating animations were created by videotaping Gretzky skating from different angles and building a 3D model to imitate his movements. The arcade hardware was built around the Voodoo Graphics chip.

The arcade game could be purchased as a dedicated cabinet or as a JAMMA-compatible conversion kit.

It was announced that the Nintendo 64 version would include fatalities after the fights, but Midway removed them from the final version. The game was originally scheduled to be published by Time Warner Interactive, but it was changed to Williams Entertainment, which was changed to Midway Home Entertainment shortly before the game's release, after the Atari Games studio was sold to WMS.

== Reception ==
Reception

Aggregate score
Aggregator	Score
GameRankings	72% (N64)

Review scores
Publication	Score
AllGame	3/5 (N64)
Computer and Video Games	3/5 (N64)
Electronic Gaming Monthly	8.25/10 (N64)
EP Daily	8/10 (N64)
GameSpot	8.1/10 (N64)
IGN	7.1/10 (N64)
N64 Magazine	70% (N64)
Next Generation	4/5 (ARC); 3/5 (N64)
Official Nintendo Magazine	84% (N64)
Super Game Power	5/5 (N64)

Next Generation hailed Wayne Gretzky's 3D Hockey as "an arcade hockey game against which to measure others." Though the reviewer suspected that the Nintendo 64 version's being released less than a month after the arcade version would prevent the game from achieving success in the arcades, he lauded the realistic physics, multiple play modes, comprehensive licensing, statistics tracking, and selection of moves. He also noted that the "Burst" button prevents situations where the puck gets out of reach for extended periods of time, ensuring continuous action.

Most reviews for the Nintendo 64 version were mixed, generally praising the polygonal graphics and overall accurate recreation of the arcade version, but remarking that while the game is great fun with four players, the mediocre A.I. makes it impossible to enjoy in single-player mode. Most critics noted that while there is a simulation mode, it does not effectively translate the game into a realistic hockey sim, making it a disappointment to the hardcore hockey fan base. For some critics this was the game's key problem; GamePro, for example, concluded, "If fast, simple hockey appeals to you and your buds, Gretzky's there with all the right bells and whistles. Just don't expect the depth and staying power of EA's NHL series or Sony's Faceoff '97." Next Generation similarly said, "Fanatical hockey fans will be disappointed, as more realistic and finer-tuned hockey games on other systems easily outdo this one ... but more action-hungry players will find Gretzky worth the money, if only because its multiplayer capabilities are a blast, the arcade mode is fast, and the fights, well, they just come with the territory." However, GameSpot's Tom Ham did not consider the lack of a true simulation option to be a problem at all, and concluded, "No more slower frame rates, small players, and limited perspectives: 64-bit action is here and boy what fun it is."

Both Tom Ham and GamePro criticized the audio commentary as being too repetitive, while Joe Rybicki of Electronic Gaming Monthly found it impressive for a cartridge-based game to have an announcer at all.

== See also ==
- Wayne Gretzky Hockey
- Hit the Ice
- NHL Open Ice
