= Top Gear Rally =

1997 video game

- North American box art
- Developer: Boss Game Studios
- Publishers: NA: Midway; EU: Kemco
- Programmer: Brian Fehdrau
- Artist: Brian Sostrom
- Composer: Barry Leitch
- Series: Top Gear
- Platform: Nintendo 64
- Release: NA: September 30, 1997; EU: November 1997
- Genre: Racing
- Modes: Single-player, multiplayer

Top Gear Rally is a 1997 racing video game developed by Boss Game Studios and released for the Nintendo 64. A follow-up to Kemco's original Top Gear game, it features a championship mode where a single player must complete six seasons of two to four races, as well as a multiplayer mode where two players may compete against each other via a split-screen display. The game's tracks combine both road and off-road surfaces and can be played in different weather conditions, including night, fog, rain, and snow. Players may customize their car with different tire grips and adjust its suspension stiffness and steering sensitivity. An option that allows players to custom paint their cars is also included.

Top Gear Rally was conceived after Boss created a non-interactive demonstration running on Silicon Graphics workstations that featured two- and four-wheel drive vehicles racing through different driving conditions. The game features a physics engine with a functioning suspension that reacts to a variety of challenging terrain. Although the cars featured in the game are fictitious, they were modeled after real vehicles. The game received generally positive reviews from critics, who praised the technical aspects of its graphics and its fluid yet challenging gameplay. Criticism was targeted at its weak sound effects and limited multiplayer mode. In 1999, the game was ported to Microsoft Windows as Boss Rally.

== Gameplay ==
The player, in second position, drifts through a road curve while trying to overtake an opponent.

Top Gear Rally is a racing game where players must drive cars on tracks that combine both road and off-road surfaces. Tracks are relatively open and may include hidden shortcuts, and each of them can be played in sunny, nocturnal, foggy, rainy, or snowy conditions. Before starting a race, players can custom paint their car, select different tire grips, adjust the suspension stiffness and steering sensitivity, and choose either a manual or automatic transmission. The acceleration, top speed, drivetrain, and engine placement of each car are different. These factors, along with the road and weather conditions, affect the handling of each car significantly. For example, the engine placement often determines how a car lands after a jump, while four-wheel drive cars have more grip on gravel tracks. Although cars can be damaged, their performance is not affected.

The game comprises four gameplay modes: Championship, Arcade, Time Attack, and Practice. In Championship mode, a single player must complete six seasons of two to four races in different weather conditions, with each race requiring the player to overtake 19 opponents controlled by the game's artificial intelligence. Points are awarded based on the rank the player finishes a race. If the required quantity is not met, the player will not be able to progress to the next season. As the player progresses through the Championship mode, new cars and tracks are unlocked. A total of nine cars and four tracks are included in the game, in addition to two bonus cars and a hidden track that can be unlocked by completing the game and finishing first in every race during the last season of the Championship mode. A mirror variant for each track can also be unlocked, which reverses curves left-to-right and right-to-left.

The Arcade, Time Attack, and Practice modes are single-race challenges on tracks that have been unlocked in the game's Championship mode. Arcade involves the player racing against an opponent while reaching designated checkpoints under a time limit, whereas Time Attack requires the player to race against a ghost car that represents their best time. In Practice mode, the player can freely drive a car on a track without opponents or time restrictions. Both the Arcade and Practice modes support up to two players. A horizontal split-screen display is used if two players compete against each other. The game features three driving perspectives for the player to choose from. These include an exterior and interior view with or without a rearview mirror. The game is compatible with both the Rumble Pak and Controller Pak. The latter is used to save custom paint jobs and the player's progress through the Championship mode.

== Development and release ==
Top Gear Rally was developed by Boss Game Studios as a follow-up to Kemco's original Top Gear game for the Super Nintendo Entertainment System. Development of the game started in July 1996, after the company created a non-interactive demonstration that featured two- and four-wheel drive vehicles racing through different driving conditions. The demonstration was enough to convince Nintendo of America that Boss could develop a game for the Nintendo 64 console. Although the demonstration was developed on Silicon Graphics workstations that were more powerful than the Nintendo 64 and included vehicles that were modeled in 15,000 polygons, Boss was confident that their finished game would be very similar, stating that technical aspects such as lighting effects could be ported easily. Although Sega Rally Championship was a major inspiration, the company considered Top Gear Rally a game that would feel and look very different.

Boss spent between two and three months developing the programming tools for the game, including a physics engine with a functioning suspension that reacts to a variety of challenging terrain. According to lead designer Colin Gordon, "the physics are very accurate, and the shocks, brakes, and handling are specific to each car. No car [drives] like another". The tracks were designed in such a way as to ensure that the game's distance fog and scenery rendering were not apparent. A level editor, which would let players create their own tracks, and a Battle Mode similar to the combat-based races of Super Mario Kart, were originally planned to be included in the game. The developers opted to limit the multiplayer mode to two players because simultaneous four-player racing would have forced them to compromise on either the draw distance or their target frame rate of 30 frames per second. Although Boss did not have licenses to use automobile manufacturing brands, the cars featured in the game were modeled after real vehicles such as the Ford Escort, the Toyota Celica, the Toyota Supra, and the Porsche 959. The soundtrack was composed by Barry Leitch and produced in 8-bit samples.

Top Gear Rally was originally intended to be released in the first quarter of 1997. In January 1997, nearly 50% of the game was complete, and by May around 80% of the game was complete. Top Gear Rally was presented at the Electronic Entertainment Expo in Atlanta in June, where attendees could play a demo. Top Gear Rally was first pitched to publisher BMG Interactive, which chose to pass on it. In North America, the game was published by Midway and released in September 30, 1997. In Europe, Top Gear Rally was released in November 1997. The Japanese version, which was released on December 5, 1997, includes a built-in EEPROM in the Nintendo 64 Game Pak that allows players to save their progress without the need of a Controller Pak. It also includes a new title sequence and car models that were more popular in Japan, such as the F150 and the Mitsubishi Pajero.

== Reception ==
Reception

Aggregate score
Aggregator	Score
GameRankings	76%

Review scores
Publication	Score
AllGame	4/5
Computer and Video Games	4/5
Edge	7/10
Electronic Gaming Monthly	8/10, 7.5/10, 7.5/10, 7/10
Game Informer	8/10
GameSpot	6.2/10
IGN	8.4/10
N64 Magazine	86%
Next Generation	4/5
Nintendo Power	7.5/10

Top Gear Rally received generally positive reviews from critics, who considered it superior to MRC: Multi-Racing Championship—another Nintendo 64 game that shares similar features. Next Generation described Top Gear Rally as "a fabulous off-road racer with tons of bonus cars, courses, and replay value to make it a keeper", stating that the game surpassed Sega Rally, while adding some twists on its own. Game Informer remarked that the game feels more natural than MRC and that its tracks are longer and more fun. In a less positive review, GameSpot felt that the game was too realistic and may frustrate players, but praised the graphics, physics, and track design. Edge said that Top Gear Rally "certainly has its moments", but thought that the game is inferior compared to other, high-quality titles in the rally genre.

The game was widely praised for its clean and crisp graphics. GameSpot remarked that "backgrounds and foregrounds seamlessly blend in an effect that's nearly photorealistic" and that the game's high frame rate "creates an impressive illusion of speed". Graphically, N64 Magazine stated that Top Gear Rally rivals most arcade games of the time, while GamePro noted details such as the reflective mud in the game's jungle track and the fact that cars can be damaged. However, some reviewers said that the game has a barren scenery and repeats textures frequently. The music and sound effects were considered weak, with Nintendo Power stating that the soundtrack does not suit the game's fast pace. Occasional glitches were found, including an instance of two cars overlapping when colliding side by side and the fact that players can get stuck on slanted roadsides, requiring them to restart the race.

The gameplay was highlighted for its fluidity and realistic feel. N64 Magazine highly praised the game's suspension physics. Many critics agreed that, although the Championship mode starts off slow and the controls require some practice, the game gradually becomes more fun and challenging as players unlock more powerful cars. The track's length and varied weather conditions were also highlighted. The split-screen multiplayer mode was criticized because of its black area on the right side of the screen, which contains the game's HUD but leaves a relatively small portion of the screen for players to observe their surroundings. The fact that both players cannot race against computer-controlled opponents was also criticized.

== PC port ==
Top Gear Rally was ported by Boss to Microsoft Windows in 1999. Because Kemco owns the Top Gear license, Boss had to release it as Boss Rally. Unlike the Nintendo 64 version, Boss Rally features three more cars and an additional track, and comprises three gameplay modes: Championship, Time Attack, and Quick Race. Both the Championship and Time Attack modes are similar to those from Top Gear Rally, whereas Quick Race is a single-race challenge where the player must race against a computer-controlled opponent. A multiplayer mode that supports up to eight players is also included.
