= NBA In the Zone 2 =

1996 basketball video game

NBA In The Zone 2
- Developer: Konami
- Publisher: Konami
- Platform: PlayStation
- Release: NA: 1996; EU: 1996; JP: November 29, 1996
- Genre: Sports

NBA In the Zone 2 is a video game developed and published by Konami for the PlayStation. It is the second installment of the NBA In The Zone series.

== Gameplay ==
NBA In The Zone 2 featured NBA rosters from the 1996–97 NBA season and support for up to eight players, and introduced substitutions and the ability to play both a full season or playoffs to the series. It also featured the American and Canadian National Anthems during the pre-game introductions.

== Reception ==
Reception

Review scores
Publication	Score
Consoles +	93%
Edge	7/10
Electronic Gaming Monthly	8.5/10
Game Players	8.6/10
GameFan	95/100
GamePro	3.5/5
GameSpot	7.1/10
IGN	9/10
Mean Machines Sega	90/100
Mega Fun	90%
Next Generation	5/5
PlayStation Official Magazine – UK	8/10
Super Game Power	5/5

Johnny Ballgame had a lukewarm response to NBA in the Zone 2, praising the player animations but complaining that only standard basketball game features are included and the gameplay is limited to little more than dunking and shooting three-pointers. He concluded that "its lack of depth dooms it to the sidelines with the rest of the middle-of-the-pack basketball games."

Next Generation, in contrast, considered it a dramatic improvement over the original game. They judged it to have greatly expanded offensive and defensive possibilities and "the most realistic looking NBA teams in videogame history." Concluding that "with its intuitive control, sharp graphics, and deep gameplay, it's the best basketball game on the planet", they scored it a perfect 5 stars.

Scoring the game a 7.1 out of 10, GameSpot's John Broady agreed with Next Generation that "The game sets a new standard of visual excellence for sports games on any console system. The realistic players practically jump off the screen, the play animation couldn't be smoother, and the camera angles provide several great views of the action." However, he also stated that the pace of the gameplay is so leisurely, it completely lacks the excitement of real basketball, though he added that this would also make it a good game for beginners at basketball games, since it gives them more opportunity to learn the mechanics. The two sports reviewers of Electronic Gaming Monthly contradicted Broady on both points, saying that the graphics and frame rate are mediocre, but that this allows the game to play much more quickly than most basketball games. They gave it an 8.5 out of 10.
