= List of Acclaim Entertainment games =

These are the games released by the video game publisher Acclaim Entertainment.

== 1987–1990 ==
Game	Developer	Platform	Note
Tiger-Heli	Micronics	NES	
Star Voyager	ASCII Entertainment	NES	
Combat zone			
Winter Games	Atelier Double	NES	
3-D WorldRunner	Square	NES	
Wizards & Warriors	Rare	NES	
Rambo	Pack-In-Video	NES	
Airwolf	Beam Software	NES	
Othello	HAL Laboratory	NES	
WWF WrestleMania	Rare	NES	
Knight Rider	Pack-In-Video	NES	
IronSword: Wizards & Warriors II	Rare	NES	
Cybernoid: The Fighting Machine	Gremlin Graphics	NES	
Wizards & Warriors X: The Fortress of Fear	Rare	Game Boy	
Double Dragon II: The Revenge	Technos	NES	
Destination Earthstar	Imagineering	NES	
Kwirk	Atlus	Game Boy	
Bigfoot	Beam Software	NES	
Narc	Rare	NES	
Total Recall	Interplay Productions	NES	
Swords and Serpents	Interplay Productions	NES	
Arch Rivals: A Basket Brawl!	Rare	NES	
Back to the Future II & III	Beam Software	NES	Released under the LJN label, first LJN title to be distributed by Acclaim.
WWF WrestleMania Challenge	Rare	NES	Released under the LJN label

== 1991 ==
Game	Developer	Platform	Label	Notes
The Punisher	Beam Software	NES	LJN	
The Simpsons: Bart vs. the Space Mutants	Imagineering (NES); Arc Developments (Game Gear, Master System, Genesis)	NES, Game Gear, Master System, Sega Genesis	Acclaim (NES); Flying Edge (Genesis, Master System, Game Gear)	
NBA All-Star Challenge	Beam Software	Game Boy	LJN	
Double Dragon III: The Sacred Stones	Technos	NES	Acclaim	
WWF Superstars	Rare	Game Boy	LJN	
Beetlejuice	Rare	NES	LJN	
The Punisher: The Ultimate Payback	Beam Software	Game Boy	Acclaim	
Bill & Ted's Excellent Video Game Adventure	Rocket Science Productions	NES	LJN	
Bill & Ted's Excellent Game Boy Adventure	Beam Software	Game Boy	LJN	
Smash TV	Beam Software	NES	Acclaim	
Trog!	Visual Concepts	NES	Acclaim	
Populous	Infinity Co., Ltd.	SNES	Acclaim	Published in North America only.
Double Dragon II	Technos	Game Boy	Acclaim	Different to the NES counterpart.
Roger Clemens' MVP Baseball	Sculptured Software	NES, Game Boy, SNES, Sega Genesis	LJN (NES, Game Boy, SNES); Flying Edge (Genesis)	
Wolverine	Software Creations	NES	LJN	
Bart Simpson's Escape from Camp Deadly	Imagineering	Game Boy	Acclaim	
The Simpsons: Bart vs. the World	Imagineering (NES); Arc Developments (Game Gear, Master System)	NES, Game Gear, Master System	Acclaim (NES); Flying Edge (Game Gear, Master System)	

== 1992 ==
Game	Developer	Platform	Label	Notes
Beetlejuice	Rare	Game Boy	LJN	Different to the NES counterpart
Terminator 2: Judgement Day	Bits Studios	Game Boy	LJN	
Terminator 2: Judgement Day	Software Creations (NES); Arc Developments (Game Gear, Master System)	NES, Game Gear, Master System	LJN	Different to the Game Boy counterpart.
Super Smash TV	Beam Software (SNES); Probe Software (Sega Genesis, Game Gear, Master System)	SNES, Sega Genesis, Game Gear, Master System	Acclaim (SNES); Flying Edge (Sega Genesis, Game Gear, Master System)	SNES and Sega versions of Smash TV
Wizards & Warriors III: Kuros: Visions of Power	Rare	NES	Acclaim	
WWF Super WrestleMania	Sculptured Software	SNES, Sega Genesis	LJN (SNES); Flying Edge (Sega Genesis)	
T&C Surf Designs: Thrilla's Surfari	Sculptured Software	NES	LJN	
WWF Superstars 2	Sculptured Software	Game Boy	LJN	
NBA All-Star Challenge 2	Beam Software	Game Boy	LJN	
Spider-Man vs. the Kingpin	Sega of America	Game Gear	Flying Edge	
The Steel Empire	Hot-B	Sega Genesis	Flying Edge	
Arch Rivals: The Arcade Game	Arc Developments	Sega Genesis, Game Gear	Flying Edge	Sega versions of the NES counterpart.
Krusty's Fun House	Audiogenic	NES, Game Boy, SNES, Sega Genesis, Game Gear, Master System	Acclaim (NES, Game Boy, SNES); Flying Edge (Genesis, Game Gear, Master System)	
Ferrari Grand Prix Challenge	System 3 Co., Ltd.	NES, Game Boy	Acclaim	
Ferrari Grand Prix Challenge	Aisystem Tokyo	Sega Genesis	Flying Edge	Different to the NES/Game Boy counterpart.
Double Dragon 3: The Arcade Game	Sales Curve Interactive (Game Boy); Software Creations (Genesis)	Game Boy, Sega Genesis	Acclaim (Game Boy); Flying Edge (Genesis)	
The Amazing Spider-Man 2	Bits Studios	Game Boy	LJN	
The Simpsons: Bart's Nightmare	Sculptured Software	SNES, Sega Genesis	Acclaim (SNES); Flying Edge (Genesis)	
George Foreman's KO Boxing	Beam Software	NES, SNES, Game Boy, Sega Genesis	Acclaim (NES, SNES, GB); Flying Edge (Genesis)	
George Foreman's KO Boxing	SIMS	Game Gear, Master System	Flying Edge	Different to the NES/SNES/Game Boy/Genesis counterpart.
WWF WrestleMania: Steel Cage Challenge	Sculptured Software (NES); Teeny Weeny Games (GG, SMS)	NES, Game Gear, Master System	LJN (NES); Flying Edge (GG, SMS)	
Spider-Man: Return of the Sinister Six	Bits Studios	NES, Game Gear, Master System	LJN (NES); Flying Edge (GG, SMS)	
The Simpsons: Bart vs. the Juggernauts	Imagineering	Game Boy	Acclaim	
Alien 3	Probe Software	Sega Genesis, Game Gear, Master System	Arena Entertainment	
Predator 2	Teeny Weeny Games	Sega Genesis, Game Gear, Master System	Arena Entertainment	
T2: The Arcade Game	Beam Software (Game Boy); Probe Software (SNES, Genesis, Game Gear, Master System)	Sega Genesis, Game Gear, Master System, SNES, Game Boy	LJN (SNES, Game Boy); Arena Entertainment (Genesis, Game Gear, Master System)	
Super High Impact	Iguana Entertainment (Genesis); Beam Software (SNES)	Sega Genesis, SNES	Arena Entertainment (Genesis); Acclaim (SNES)	
The Incredible Crash Dummies	Software Creations (GB); Teeny Weeny Games (GG, SMS)	Game Boy, Game Gear, Master System	LJN (GB); Flying Edge (Game Gear, Master System)	
The Simpsons: Bartman Meets Radioactive Man	Imagineering (NES); Teeny Weeny Games (Game Gear)	NES, Game Gear	Acclaim (NES); Flying Edge (Game Gear)	
Spider-Man and the X-Men in Arcade's Revenge	Software Creations (SNES, Genesis, Game Gear); Unexpected Development (Game Boy)	SNES, Sega Genesis, Game Boy, Game Gear	LJN (SNES, Game Boy); Flying Edge (Genesis, Game Gear)	
NBA All-Star Challenge	Beam Software	SNES, Sega Genesis	LJN (SNES); Flying Edge (Genesis)	Different to the Game Boy counterpart.

== 1993 ==
Game	Developer	Platform	Label	Notes
Alien 3	Bits Studios	Game Boy	LJN	Different to the Sega counterpart.
Alien 3	Probe Software	NES	LJN	Different to the Sega and Game Boy counterparts.
Alien 3	Probe Software	SNES	LJN	Different to the Sega, Game Boy and NES counterparts.
WWF Royal Rumble	Sculptured Software	SNES, Sega Genesis	LJN (SNES); Flying Edge (Genesis)	
Spider-Man 3: Invasion of the Spider Slayers	Bits Studios	Game Boy	LJN	
WWF King of the Ring	Eastridge Technology	NES, Game Boy	LJN	
Mortal Kombat	Sculptured Software (SNES); Probe Software (GB, Genesis, Game Gear, Master System, Sega CD)	SNES, Game Boy, Game Gear, Master System, Sega Genesis, Sega CD	Acclaim (SNES, Game Boy); Arena Entertainment (Genesis, Master System, Game Gear, Sega CD)	
The Incredible Crash Dummies	Software Creations	NES	LJN	Different to the Game Boy counterpart.
RoboCop 3	Eden Entertainment Software	Sega Genesis, Master System, Game Gear	Flying Edge	
The Addams Family	Ocean Software	Sega Genesis	Flying Edge	
The Addams Family	Arc Developments	Game Gear, Master System	Flying Edge	Different to the Sega Genesis counterpart.
The Incredible Crash Dummies	Gray Matter	SNES, Sega Genesis	LJN (SNES); Flying Edge (Genesis)	Different to the other versions.
Terminator 2: Judgement Day	Bits Studios	SNES, Sega Genesis	LJN (SNES); Flying Edge (Genesis)	Different to the other versions.
NFL Quarterback Club	Beam Software	Game Boy	LJN	
WWF Rage in the Cage	Sculptured Software	Sega CD	Arena Entertainment	

== 1994 ==
Game	Developer	Platform	Label	Notes
The Simpsons: Bart & the Beanstalk	Software Creations	Game Boy	Acclaim	
NBA Jam	Iguana Entertainment (SNES, Genesis, Game Gear); Beam Software (Game Boy)	SNES, Game Boy, Sega Genesis, Game Gear, Sega CD	Acclaim (SNES, Game Boy, Sega CD); Arena Entertainment (Genesis, Game Gear)	
Champions World Class Soccer	Park Place Productions	SNES, Sega Genesis	Acclaim (SNES); Flying Edge (Genesis)	
Mortal Kombat II	Sculptured Software (SNES); Probe Entertainment (other versions)	SNES, Sega Genesis, Game Boy, 32X, Game Gear, PlayStation, Saturn, Master System	Acclaim	
NFL Quarterback Club	Iguana Entertainment (SNES/Genesis/32X); Condor (Game Gear/Game Boy)	SNES, Game Boy, Sega Genesis, Game Gear, 32X	LJN (SNES, Game Boy); Acclaim (Game Gear, Genesis, 32X)	Released as NFL Quarterback Club II on Game Boy
Stargate	Probe Entertainment	SNES, Sega Genesis, Game Gear, Game Boy	Acclaim	
Virtual Bart	Sculptured Software	SNES, Sega Genesis	Acclaim	
Spider-Man & Venom in Maximum Carnage	Software Creations	SNES, Sega Genesis	Acclaim (GEN); LJN (SNES)	
WWF Raw	Sculptured Software	SNES, Sega Genesis, Game Boy, 32X, Game Gear	LJN (SNES, Game Boy); Acclaim (Genesis, 32X, Game Gear)	
Newman/Haas Indy Car featuring Nigel Mansell	Gremlin Interactive	SNES, Sega Genesis	Acclaim	
Wolverine: Adamantium Rage	Teeny Weeny Games	Sega Genesis	Acclaim	
Wolverine: Adamantium Rage	Bits Studios	SNES	LJN	Different to the Genesis version.
Monster Truck Wars	Gremlin Interactive	Game Boy, Game Gear	Acclaim	
Bloodshot	Domark	Sega Genesis, Sega CD	Acclaim	Released in Europe only.
Itchy & Scratchy in Miniature Golf Madness	Beam Software	Game Boy	Acclaim	
Rise of the Robots	Mirage; Data Design Interactive (Genesis)	SNES, Sega Genesis	Acclaim	

== 1995 ==
Game	Developer	Platform	Label	Notes
Demolition Man	Alexandria	SNES, Sega Genesis, Sega CD	Acclaim	
NBA Jam: Tournament Edition	Iguana Entertainment; Torus Games (GB)	SNES, Sega Genesis, Game Gear, Game Boy, 32X, Saturn, PlayStation, Windows	Acclaim	
Syndicate	Domark & Bullfrog Productions	Sega CD	Acclaim	Released exclusively in Europe.
The Death and Return of Superman	Blizzard Entertainment	Sega Genesis	Acclaim	Published in Europe only.
Warlock	Realtime Associates	SNES, Sega Genesis	LJN (SNES); Acclaim (Genesis)	
Dragon: The Bruce Lee Story	Virgin Interactive Entertainment	SNES, Sega Genesis, Game Gear	Acclaim	Published in North America only.
The Itchy & Scratchy Game	Bits Corporation	SNES, Game Gear	Acclaim	
Spider-Man: The Animated Series	Western Technologies Incorporated	SNES, Sega Genesis	LJN (SNES); Acclaim (Genesis)	
Spot Goes to Hollywood	Eurocom Entertainment Software	Sega Genesis	Acclaim	
Venom - Spider-Man: Separation Anxiety	Software Creations	SNES, Sega Genesis, Windows	Acclaim	
Batman Forever	Probe Entertainment	SNES, Sega Genesis, Game Boy, Game Gear, Windows	Acclaim	
Frank Thomas Big Hurt Baseball	Iguana Entertainment	SNES, Sega Genesis, Game Boy, Game Gear, Windows, PlayStation, Saturn	Acclaim	
Street Fighter: The Movie	Capcom	PlayStation, Saturn	Acclaim	
WWF WrestleMania: The Arcade Game	Sculptured Software	SNES, Sega Genesis, 32X, Windows, PlayStation, Saturn	Acclaim	
F1 World Championship Edition	Domark	SNES, Sega Genesis	Acclaim	
Foreman for Real	Software Creations	SNES, Sega Genesis, Game Boy, Game Gear	Acclaim	
Porky Pig's Haunted Holiday	Sun Corporation of America, Inc. Phoenix Interactive Entertainment	SNES	Acclaim	
Speedy Gonzales: Los Gatos Bandidos	Sun Corporation of America, Inc. David A. Palmer Productions	SNES	Acclaim	
Scooby-Doo Mystery	Sun Corporation of America, Inc. Argonaut Software	SNES	Acclaim	
Scooby-Doo Mystery	Sun Corporation of America, Inc. Illusions Gaming Company	Sega Genesis	Acclaim	Different to the SNES version
NFL Quarterback Club 96	Iguana Entertainment	SNES, Sega Genesis, Game Boy, Game Gear, Windows, Saturn	Acclaim	
Theme Park	Domark & Bullfrog Productions	Sega CD	Acclaim	Released exclusively in Europe.
True Lies	Beam Software	SNES, Game Boy, Sega Genesis, Game Gear	LJN (SNES, Game Boy); Acclaim (Genesis, Game Gear)	
Judge Dredd	Probe Entertainment	SNES, Sega Genesis, Game Boy, Game Gear, Windows	Acclaim	
Total Football	Domark	Sega Genesis	Acclaim	Released exclusively in Europe.
Todd MacFarlane's Spawn: The Video Game	Ukiyotei Ltd.	SNES	Acclaim	
Justice League: Task Force	Sun Corporation of America, Inc. Blizzard Entertainment (SNES); Condor (Genesis)	SNES, Sega Genesis	Acclaim	
Dirt Trax FX	Sculptured Software	SNES	Acclaim	
Jupiter Strike	High-Tech Lab of Japan	PlayStation	Acclaim	
Myst	Sunsoft	Saturn	Acclaim	
Robotica	Micronet	Saturn	Acclaim	Published in North America only.
Mortal Kombat 3	Sculptured Software	SNES, Sega Genesis, Game Boy, Game Gear	Acclaim	Published in Europe only.
Marko's Magic Football	Domark	SNES	Acclaim	Released exclusively in Europe.
Revolution X	Rage Software; Software Creations (PS, Saturn)	SNES, Sega Genesis, Windows, Saturn, PlayStation	Acclaim	
Virtual Open Tennis	Arc System Works	Saturn	Acclaim	
Galactic Attack	Ving	Saturn	Acclaim	

== 1996 ==
Game	Developer	Platform	Notes
Alien Trilogy	Probe Entertainment	Saturn, PlayStation	
Rise 2: Resurrection	Mirage	PlayStation, Saturn, Windows	
College Slam	Iguana Entertainment; Torus Games (GB)	Windows, Sega Genesis, SNES, Saturn, PlayStation, Game Boy	
Cutthroat Island	Software Creations	SNES, Sega Genesis, Game Boy, Game Gear	
Dragonheart	Torus Games	Game Boy	
Iron Man / X-O Manowar in Heavy Metal	Realtime Associates	PlayStation, Saturn, Game Gear, Game Boy	
Killing Zone	Scarab	PlayStation	
V-Tennis	Tonkinhouse	PlayStation	
Battle Monsters	Scarab	Saturn	
Bust-a-Move 2: Arcade Edition	Taito	PlayStation, Saturn, Nintendo 64, Windows, Game Boy	
X-Men: Children of the Atom	Capcom (Saturn); Probe Entertainment (other versions)	PlayStation, Saturn, Windows	
Bubble Bobble also featuring Rainbow Islands	Probe Entertainment	PlayStation, Saturn, Windows	
Striker '96	Rage Software	PlayStation, Saturn, Windows	
The Deep: Ushinawareta Shinkai	Marionette	PlayStation	Released in Japan only.
Batman Forever: The Arcade Game	Iguana Entertainment	PlayStation, Saturn, Windows	
D	WARP	PlayStation, Saturn, Windows	
Dragonheart: Fire & Steel	Funcom	PlayStation, Saturn, Windows	
NBA Jam Extreme	Sculptured Software	PlayStation, Saturn, Windows	
Tunnel B1	NEON Software	PlayStation, Saturn	Published in North America only.
Darius Gaiden	Aisystem Tokyo Co., Ltd.	Saturn	
Star Fighter	Krisalis Software	PlayStation, Saturn	
Space Jam	Sculptured Software	PlayStation, Saturn, Windows	
Impact Racing	Funcom	PlayStation, Saturn	Published in North America only.
Iron & Blood	Take-Two Interactive Software	PlayStation	
Ultimate Mortal Kombat 3	Avalanche Software	SNES, Sega Genesis	Published in Europe only.
WWF In Your House	Sculptured Software	PlayStation, Saturn, Windows	

== 1997 ==
Game	Developer	Platform	Label	Note
Turok: Dinosaur Hunter	Iguana Entertainment	Nintendo 64, Windows	Acclaim	
The Crow: City of Angels	Gray Matter Studios	PlayStation, Saturn, Windows	Acclaim	
Psychic Force	Taito	PlayStation	Acclaim	
All-Star Baseball '97 Featuring Frank Thomas	Iguana Entertainment	PlayStation, Saturn	Acclaim	
BattleSport	Cyclone Studios; Unexpected Development	PlayStation, Saturn, Windows	Acclaim	
Scorcher	Zyrinx	Saturn	Acclaim	Published in Japan Only
Magic: The Gathering - BattleMage	Realtime Associates	PlayStation, Windows	Acclaim	
Fantastic Four	Probe Entertainment	PlayStation	Acclaim	
NHL Breakaway 98	Sculptured Software	PlayStation, Nintendo 64	Acclaim Sports	Released on the Nintendo 64 in 1998
Extreme-G	Probe Entertainment	Nintendo 64	Acclaim	
NFL Quarterback Club 98	Iguana Entertainment	Nintendo 64	Acclaim Sports	
Riven: The Sequel to Myst	Sunsoft	PlayStation	Acclaim	PS1 version only
Turok: Battle of the Bionosaurs	Bit Managers	Game Boy	Acclaim	Game Boy counterpart to Turok: Dinosaur Hunter
Bust-A-Move 3	Taito	Saturn	Acclaim	Published in Europe Only

== 1998 ==
Game	Developer	Platform	Label	Note
Bust-A-Move 3DX	Taito	PlayStation, Nintendo 64, Game Boy	Acclaim	Enhanced version of Bust-A-Move 3. Released as Bust-A-Move 99 in North America and released in 1999 there.
Brain Drain	Visual Impact	Game Boy	Acclaim	
Forsaken	Probe Entertainment; Iguana Entertainment UK (N64)	PlayStation, Windows, Nintendo 64	Acclaim	
All-Star Baseball 99	Iguana Entertainment	Nintendo 64, Game Boy	Acclaim Sports	
Jeremy McGrath Supercross 98	Probe Entertainment	PlayStation	Acclaim Sports	
WWF War Zone	Iguana West	PlayStation, Nintendo 64, Game Boy	Acclaim Sports	
Iggy's Reckin' Balls	Iguana Entertainment	Nintendo 64	Acclaim	
Batman & Robin	Iguana Entertainment	PlayStation	Acclaim	
Super Match Soccer	Cranberry Source	PlayStation, Windows	Acclaim	Released exclusively in Europe.
Extreme-G 2	Probe Entertainment	Nintendo 64, Windows	Acclaim	PC version released in 1999.
Turok 2: Seeds of Evil	Iguana Entertainment	Nintendo 64, Windows	Acclaim	PC version released in 1999.
Turok 2: Seeds of Evil	Bit Managers	Game Boy Color	Acclaim	Different to the console/PC version.
No One Can Stop Mr. Domino	Artdink	PlayStation	Acclaim	Published only in North America.
NFL Quarterback Club 99	Iguana West	Nintendo 64	Acclaim Sports	
NHL Breakaway 99	Iguana West	Nintendo 64	Acclaim Sports	
NBA Jam 99	Iguana Entertainment; Torus Games (GBC)	Nintendo 64, Game Boy Color	Acclaim Sports	
South Park	Iguana Entertainment; Appaloosa Interactive (PS1)	Nintendo 64, Windows, PlayStation	Acclaim	PC and PS1 versions released in 1999

== 1999 ==
Game	Developer	Platform	Label	Note
All-Star Baseball 2000	Iguana Entertainment	Nintendo 64, Game Boy Color	Acclaim Sports	
Machines	Charybdis	Windows	Acclaim	
Bust-A-Move 4	Taito	PlayStation, Game Boy Color, Dreamcast	Acclaim; Club Acclaim (Dreamcast)	Dreamcast version released in 2000
Pumuckls Abenteuer bei den Piraten	Neon Software	Game Boy Color	Acclaim	Released exclusively in Germany.
WWF Attitude	Acclaim Studios Salt Lake City	PlayStation, Nintendo 64, Game Boy Color, Dreamcast	Acclaim Sports	
Shadow Man	Acclaim Studios Teesside	Nintendo 64, Windows, Dreamcast, PlayStation	Acclaim	
Re-Volt	Acclaim Studios London	Nintendo 64, Windows, Dreamcast, PlayStation	Acclaim	
NFL Quarterback Club 2000	Acclaim Studios Austin	Nintendo 64, Dreamcast	Acclaim	
TrickStyle	Criterion Games	Dreamcast, Windows	Acclaim	
Psychic Force 2012	Taito	Dreamcast	None	Distribution and Dreamcast version only, self-published by Taito
South Park: Chef's Luv Shack	Acclaim Studios Austin	Nintendo 64, Windows, Dreamcast, PlayStation	Acclaim	
Turok: Rage Wars	Acclaim Studios Austin	Nintendo 64	Acclaim	
NBA Jam 2000	Acclaim Studios Salt Lake City	Nintendo 64	Acclaim Sports	
Armorines: Project S.W.A.R.M.	Acclaim Studios London; Neon Software (GBC)	Nintendo 64, Game Boy Color, PlayStation	Acclaim	PS1 version released in 2000
Pac-Man: Special Colour Edition	Namco	Game Boy Color	Acclaim	Published only in Europe.
Ms. Pac-Man: Special Colour Edition	Namco	Game Boy Color	Acclaim	Published only in Europe.
The New Adventures of Mary-Kate and Ashley	Crawfish Interactive	Game Boy Color	Club Acclaim	Released Exclusively in North America.
Dropzone	Awesome Developments	Game Boy Color	Acclaim	Released Exclusively in Europe.
Tee Off	Bottom Up	Dreamcast	Acclaim	

== 2000 ==
Game	Developer	Platform	Label	Note
South Park Rally	Tantalus Interactive	PlayStation, Nintendo 64, Windows, Dreamcast	Acclaim	
ECW Hardcore Revolution	Acclaim Studios Salt Lake City	PlayStation, Dreamcast, Nintendo 64, Game Boy Color	Acclaim	
Jeremy McGrath Supercross 2000	Acclaim Studios Salt Lake City	PlayStation, Dreamcast, Nintendo 64, Game Boy Color	Acclaim Sports	
All-Star Baseball 2001	High Voltage Software	Nintendo 64, Game Boy Color	Acclaim Sports	
Spirit of Speed 1937	Broadsword Interactive	Dreamcast	LJN (NA/EU); Acclaim (Japan)	Dreamcast version only. Copublished with Taito in Japan.
Fur Fighters	Bizarre Creations	Dreamcast, Windows	Acclaim	
Mary-Kate and Ashley: Get A Clue	Crawfish Interactive	Game Boy Color	Club Acclaim	
Turok: Rage Wars	Bit Managers	Game Boy Color	Acclaim	Separate to the Nintendo 64 version.
Soccer Manager	Brodsword Interactive	Game Boy Color	Acclaim	Only released in Europe.
Dead or Alive 2	Tecmo	Dreamcast	Acclaim	Published in Europe only
Turok 3: Shadow of Oblivion	Bit Managers	Game Boy Color	Acclaim	Separate to the Nintendo 64 version.
NFL QB Club 2001	Acclaim Studios Salt Lake City	Nintendo 64, Dreamcast	Acclaim Sports	
ECW Anarchy Rulz	Acclaim Studios Salt Lake City	PlayStation, Dreamcast	Acclaim	
RC Revenge	Acclaim Studios Cheltenham	PlayStation, PlayStation 2	Acclaim	Sequel to Re-Volt. PS2 version released as RC Revenge Pro.
ATV Quad Power Racing	Climax Brighton; Tantalus (GBA)	PlayStation, Game Boy Advance	Acclaim Sports (PS1); AKA Acclaim (GBA)	GBA version released in 2002
Turok 3: Shadow of Oblivion	Acclaim Studios Austin	Nintendo 64	Acclaim	
F355 Challenge	Sega AM2	Dreamcast	Acclaim	Dreamcast version only, excluding Japan
Dave Mirra Freestyle BMX	Z-Axis; NEON Software (GBC)	PlayStation, Dreamcast, Windows, Game Boy Color	Acclaim Max Sports	
RC de Go!	Taito	PlayStation	Acclaim	
Mary-Kate and Ashley: Magical Mystery Mall	n-Space	PlayStation	Club Acclaim	
Bust-A-Move Millennium	Taito	Game Boy Color	Club Acclaim	
Freestyle Motocross: McGrath vs Pastrana	Z-Axis	PlayStation	Acclaim Max Sports	
Pumuckls Abenteuer im Geisterschloss	NEON Software	Game Boy Color	Acclaim	
Maya The Bee: Garden Adventures	NEON Software	Game Boy Color	Acclaim	
HBO Boxing	Osiris Studios	PlayStation	Acclaim Sports	
Super Bust-A-Move	Taito	PlayStation 2	Acclaim	
Mary-Kate and Ashley: Pocket Planner	Powerhead Games	Game Boy Color	Club Acclaim	
NBA Jam 2001	Digital Creations	Game Boy Color	Acclaim Sports	
Maya The Bee and her Friends	Crawfish Interactive	Game Boy Color	Acclaim	Only released in Europe.

== 2001 ==
Game	Developer	Platform	Label	Note
Ducati World Racing Challenge	Attention to Detail	PlayStation, Dreamcast, Windows	Acclaim	
Vanishing Point	Clockwork Games	PlayStation, Dreamcast	Acclaim	
Mary-Kate and Ashley: Winners Circle	Tantalus Media; M4 Limited (GBC)	PlayStation, Game Boy Color	Club Acclaim	
All-Star Baseball 2002	Acclaim Studios Austin	PlayStation 2, GameCube	Acclaim Sports	GameCube version released only in North America.
Antz Racing	RFX Interactive	Game Boy Color	Club Acclaim	Co-published with Light and Shadow Production in North America.
Crazy Taxi	Acclaim Studios Cheltenham	PlayStation 2, GameCube	Acclaim	Ported for Sega. Published by Sega in Japan
Dave Mirra Freestyle BMX: Maximum Remix	Z-Axis	PlayStation	Acclaim Max Sports	
Blast Lacrosse	Sandbox Studios	PlayStation	Acclaim Sports	released only in North America
Fur Fighters: Viggo's Revenge	Bizarre Creations	PlayStation 2	Acclaim	Enhanced port of Fur Fighters
Power Shovel	Taito	PlayStation	Acclaim	Published in North America only
Extreme-G 3	Acclaim Studios Cheltenham	PlayStation 2, GameCube	Acclaim	
Dave Mirra Freestyle BMX 2	Z-Axis; Full Fat (GBA)	PlayStation 2, GameCube, Xbox, Game Boy Advance	Acclaim Max Sports	
Paris-Dakar Rally	Broadsword Interactive	PlayStation 2, Windows	Acclaim	
Mary-Kate and Ashley: Crush Course	n-Space; Crawfish Interactive (GBC)	PlayStation, Windows, Game Boy Color	Club Acclaim	
NFL Quarterback Club 2002	Acclaim Studios Austin	PlayStation 2, GameCube	Acclaim Sports	
Burnout	Criterion Games	PlayStation 2, GameCube, Xbox	Acclaim	GameCube and Xbox versions released in 2002
18 Wheeler: American Pro Trucker	Acclaim Studios Cheltenham	PlayStation 2, GameCube	Acclaim	Ported for Sega. GameCube version released in 2002
Jeremy McGrath Supercross World	Acclaim Studios Salt Lake City	PlayStation 2, GameCube	Acclaim Max Sports	GameCube version released in 2002
Kevin Sheedy AFL Coach 2002	IR Gurus	Windows	Acclaim Sports	Released only in Australia.
Legends of Wrestling	Acclaim Studios Salt Lake City	PlayStation 2, GameCube, Xbox	Acclaim	GameCube and Xbox versions released in 2002.

== 2002 ==
Game	Developer	Platform	Label	Note
NBA Jam 2002	DC Studios	Game Boy Advance	Acclaim Sports	Published in North America only.
All-Star Baseball 2003	Acclaim Studios Austin; Creations (GBA)	PlayStation 2, Xbox, GameCube, Game Boy Advance	Acclaim Sports	GCN and GBA versions released only in North America.
Shadow Man: 2econd Coming	Acclaim Studios Teesside	PlayStation 2	Acclaim	Last game developed by Acclaim Studios Teesside
Ecco the Dolphin: Defender of the Future	Appaloosa Interactive	PlayStation 2	Acclaim	Published in North America only
Kick Off 02	Anco Software	Windows	Acclaim	Released only in Europe.
Mary-Kate and Ashley: Girls Night Out	Powerhead Games	Game Boy Advance	Club Acclaim	
Maya the Bee: The Great Adventure	Shin'en Multimedia	Game Boy Advance	Acclaim	Released only in Europe.
ZooCube	PuzzleKings; Coyote Console; Graphic State (GBA)	GameCube, Game Boy Advance	Acclaim	
Headhunter	Amuze	PlayStation 2	Acclaim	Published in North America only
Punch King	Full Fat	Game Boy Advance	Acclaim	
Aggressive Inline	Z-Axis; Full Fat (GBA)	PlayStation 2, GameCube, Xbox, Game Boy Advance	AKA Acclaim	
Turok: Evolution	Acclaim Studios Austin; RFX Interactive (GBA); Super Happy Fun Fun (PC)	PlayStation 2, GameCube, Xbox, Windows, Game Boy Advance	Acclaim	PC version released exclusively in Europe in late 2003
AFL Live 2003	IR Gurus	PlayStation 2, Xbox, Windows	Acclaim Sports	Released only in Australia.
Burnout 2: Point of Impact	Criterion Games	PlayStation 2, GameCube, Xbox	Acclaim	GameCube and Xbox versions released in 2003
Mary-Kate and Ashley: Sweet 16 - Licensed to Drive	n-Space; Powerhead Games (GBA)	Game Boy Advance, PlayStation 2, GameCube	Club Acclaim	GameCube version released in 2003
BMX XXX	Z-Axis	PlayStation 2, GameCube, Xbox	AKA Acclaim	
Dave Mirra Freestyle BMX 3	Full Fat	Game Boy Advance	Acclaim	
Legends of Wrestling II	Acclaim Studios Salt Lake City; Powerhead Games (GBA)	PlayStation 2, GameCube, Xbox. Game Boy Advance	Acclaim	Last game developed by Acclaim Studios Salt Lake City
Virtua Tennis 2	Hitmaker	PlayStation 2	Acclaim	Published in Europe only
Virtua Cop: Elite Edition	Sega AM2	PlayStation 2	Acclaim	Published in Europe only

== 2003 ==
Game	Developer	Platform	Label	Note
ATV Quad Power Racing 2	Climax Brighton	PlayStation 2, Xbox, GameCube	AKA Acclaim	
Vexx	Acclaim Studios Austin	PlayStation 2, Xbox, GameCube	Acclaim	
All-Star Baseball 2004	Acclaim Studios Austin; Acclaim Studios Manchester (GBA)	PlayStation 2, Xbox, GameCube, Game Boy Advance	Acclaim Sports	Non-PS2 versions Released only in North America.
Dakar 2: The World's Ultimate Rally	Acclaim Studios Cheltenham	PlayStation 2, Xbox, GameCube	Acclaim	PS2 version released only in Europe.
Sega Bass Fishing Duel	Wow Entertainment	PlayStation 2	Acclaim	Published in Europe only
Speed Kings	Climax Studios	PlayStation 2, GameCube, Xbox	Acclaim	
SX Superstar	Climax Studios	PlayStation 2, Xbox, GameCube	AKA Acclaim (North America); Acclaim (Europe)	
Summer Heat Beach Volleyball	Acclaim Studios Cheltenham	PlayStation 2	Acclaim	
AFL Live 2004	IR Gurus	PlayStation 2, Xbox	Acclaim	Released only in Europe and Australia.
XGRA: Extreme-G Racing Association	Acclaim Studios Cheltenham	PlayStation 2, GameCube, Xbox	Acclaim	
NBA Jam	Acclaim Studios Austin	PlayStation 2, Xbox	Acclaim	
Wallace and Gromit in Project Zoo	Frontier Developments	PlayStation 2, GameCube, Xbox, Windows	Acclaim	European and Australian distribution only - published by BAM! Entertainment
Ed, Edd n Eddy: Jawbreakers!	Climax Group	Game Boy Advance	Acclaim	European and Australian distribution only - published by BAM! Entertainment
Samurai Jack: The Amulet of Time	Virtucraft	Game Boy Advance	Acclaim	European and Australian distribution only - published by BAM! Entertainment
Gladiator: Sword of Vengeance	Acclaim Studios Manchester	PlayStation 2, Xbox, Windows	Acclaim	Only major game developed by Acclaim Studios Manchester under that name.
The Powerpuff Girls: Relish Rampage - Pickled Edition	VIS Entertainment	GameCube	Acclaim	European and Australian distribution only - published by BAM! Entertainment

== 2004 ==
Game	Developer	Platform	Note
Baldur's Gate: Dark Alliance II	Black Isle Studios	PlayStation 2, Xbox	Sub-distributed for Avalon Interactive in the UK, France, Germany, and Benelux. Published by Interplay Entertainment
Urban Freestyle Soccer	Gusto Games	PlayStation 2, Xbox, GameCube, Windows	
Worms 3D	Team17	PlayStation 2, GameCube, Windows	Published in North America only.
Carmen Sandiego: The Secret of the Stolen Drums	Artificial Mind and Movement	PlayStation 2, GameCube, Xbox	European and Australian distribution only - published by BAM! Entertainment
All-Star Baseball 2005	Acclaim Studios Austin	PlayStation 2, Xbox	Released only in North America
Alias	Acclaim Studios Cheltenham	PlayStation 2, Xbox, Windows	Last game developed by Acclaim Studios Cheltenham. PC version released in June 2004.
World Championship Rugby	Swordfish Studios	PlayStation 2, Xbox	Released only in Europe. North American release cancelled after Acclaim's bankruptcy.
AFL Live Premiership Edition	IR Gurus	PlayStation 2, Xbox	Released only in Australia.
Showdown: Legends of Wrestling	Acclaim Studios Austin	PlayStation 2, Xbox	Last game developed by Acclaim Studios Austin.
Kreed	Burut Creative Team	Windows	Published in Europe only.

== 2025 (as Acclaim, Inc. - "Play Acclaim") ==
Game	Developer	Platform	Note
Katanuat	VoidMaw	Windows	Released September 10th, 2025
Basketball Classics	Namo Gamo	Windows, Nintendo Switch, PlayStation 4, Xbox One, Xbox Series X/S	Released December 18th, 2019, Home Consoles March 19th 2026
The Prisoning: Fletcher's Quest	Elden Pixels	Windows, Nintendo Switch	Released February 10th, 2026
HYPERyuki: Snowboard Syndicate	Wabisabi Design, Inc.	Windows	Announced September 10th, 2025
Ground Zero Hero	Rowan Edmonson	Windows	Announced September 10th, 2025
Pixel Washer	Valadria	Windows	Announced September 10th, 2025
Tossdown	Fer Factor	Windows	Announced September 10th, 2025
GRIDbeat!	Ridiculous Games	Windows, Nintendo Switch	Released March 26th, 2026
Talaka	Potato Kid	Windows	Announced September 10th, 2025
Super Basketball Classics	Namo Gamo	Windows	Announced March 10th, 2026

== Cancelled games ==
Game	Developer	Platform	Note
NBA Jam	Iguana Entertainment	Master System	
Monster Truck Wars	Unknown	SNES	Cancelled for unknown reasons.
The Itchy & Scratchy Game	Bits Corporation	Sega Genesis	
Revolution X	Rage Software	32X	
Duel	unknown	32X	Was only a 32X tech demo.
Immortal	Acclaim Arcade Studio	Arcade	Cancelled for unknown reasons, only a few character renders remain.
Killing Time	Torus Games	PlayStation, Saturn	
South Park	Crawfish Interactive	Game Boy Color	Cancelled as the show's creators, Trey Parker and Matt Stone, didn't want the title to be released on a video game system targeted outside South Park's target audience of adults. The game's engine was repurposed for Maya the Bee and her Friends, which was released in Europe, and The New Adventures of Mary-Kate & Ashley, which was released in North America.
Ultra Soccer/Acclaim Sports Soccer (Ultimate Football)	Probe Entertainment	Nintendo 64	Scheduled for an August 1999 release, the game was cancelled either because of quality standards or the problems with the Engine being used for the game.
Re-Volt	Digital Creations	Game Boy Color	Cancelled after the game's development went over time. The source code and engine were reused for Race Time and ATV Racers for the same systems, abit being published by different companies.
Ferrari 360 Challenge	Brain in a Jar	PlayStation 2	Cancelled due to high development costs and undisclosed troubles with the Ferrari license.
Turok	unknown	Game Boy Advance	A tech demo made for testing purposes. It was a GBA port of Turok: Dinosaur Hunter.
Extreme-G 3	Similis	Game Boy Advance	Cancelled very early in development.
Re-Volt Live	unknown	Xbox	Never left beta for unknown reasons.
Turok Resurrection	Acclaim Studios Austin	PlayStation 2, Xbox (Possibly GameCube or Windows as well)	Never got off the drawing board as the team who were planning the title had moved on to other projects.
Forsaken 2	Acclaim Studios Teesside	PlayStation 2, Xbox	Cancelled due to the closure of the Teesside studio. Was supposed to be a sequel to Forsaken. Only a small racing demo remains of this title.
Mary-Kate and Ashley in Action!	unknown	PlayStation 2, GameCube, Game Boy Advance, Windows	Cancelled due to Acclaim and Dualstar Entertainment parting ways.
Emergency Mayhem	Acclaim Studios Cheltenham	PlayStation 2, Xbox	Cancelled due to the closure of Acclaim Studios Cheltenham. The publishing rights were eventually bought by Codemasters, finished off by Supersonic Software, and was released on the Wii in April 2008.
The Last Job	Acclaim Studios Cheltenham	PlayStation 2, Xbox	Cancelled due to the closure of Acclaim Studios Cheltenham.
Interview with a Made Man	Acclaim Studios Manchester	PlayStation 2, Xbox	Cancelled due to the closure of Acclaim Studios Manchester. Was eventually finished by former employees of the studio, and the publishing rights would be bought by Mastertronic and Aspyr, and would be released simply as Made Man in late 2006. The Xbox version never saw the light of day.
ATV: Quad Power Racing 3	Acclaim Studios Manchester	PlayStation 2, Xbox	Cancelled due to the closure of Acclaim Studios Manchester. Only a prototype of the Xbox version is all that remains of this title.
Juiced	Juice Games	PlayStation 2, Xbox	After Acclaim's closure, the game's publishing rights were bought by THQ and the game was delayed so it could be polished more further. It was eventually released in May 2005. An almost-final Prototype of the Acclaim version exists for the Xbox.
The Red Star	Acclaim Studios Austin	PlayStation 2, Xbox	The entire game was completed but was never published following Acclaim's bankruptcy. The game's publishing rights were bought by the Budget publisher XS Games and was released in 2007 as a PS2-exclusive budget title. The canceled but complete Xbox version can be downloaded on a modded console.
100 Bullets	Acclaim Studios Austin	PlayStation 2, Xbox	Cancelled due to the closure of Acclaim Studios Austin.
