= NFL Quarterback Club 97 =

1996 video game

- North American PlayStation cover art with Dan Marino
- Developer: Iguana Entertainment
- Publisher: Acclaim Entertainment
- Series: NFL Quarterback Club
- Platforms: PlayStation, Saturn, MS-DOS
- Release: Saturn: NA: August 29, 1996; EU: August 1996; PlayStation: NA: August 29, 1996; EU: January 1997; MS-DOS: NA: September 6, 1996
- Genre: Sports (American football)
- Modes: Single-player, multiplayer

NFL Quarterback Club 97 is an American football video game published in 1996 for the PlayStation, Saturn, and MS-DOS. The game was also released in Japan on the Saturn. The game's cover features former Miami Dolphins quarterback Dan Marino.

== Gameplay ==
NFL Quarterback Club 97 optimizes the use of the kicking meter, as well as overhead camera angles, which are customizable. The game also has Custom Simulation modes, which save up to five game situations for players that cannot finish a game in time. Former Green Bay Packers quarterback Brett Favre designed various plays that are available in the game. There are five possible game modes (Preseason, Regular Season, Pro Bowl, Playoff, and Super Bowl). Players can also recreate historic game situations. There is no announcer on the PlayStation version.

== Reception ==
Reception

Aggregate score
Aggregator	Score
GameRankings	59% (PS)

Review scores
Publication	Score
AllGame	3/5 (PS); 3/5 (PC)
Electronic Gaming Monthly	5.85/10 (PS)
GameSpot	5.6/10 (PS)
IGN	5.0/10 (PS)
Next Generation	3/5 (SS)
Sega Saturn Magazine	65% (SS)

The game received mixed to negative reviews. Reviewing the PlayStation version, the two sports reviewers of Electronic Gaming Monthly both regarded it as a disappointment, though for different reasons: Dindo Perez said the graphics are substandard, while Todd Mowatt said the graphics are vastly improved from the previous Quarterback Club but the AI is too easy to beat by a wide margin. IGN simply commented that the game is slow and the graphics are weak, it is not better than competitor Madden NFL 97, and players should wait for NFL Quarterback Club '98. GamePro also compared it unfavorably to Madden NFL 97. They said that while it is solid in terms of gameplay and features, the graphics, though better on the PlayStation than on any other version, suffer from choppy scrolling and animation which make it difficult to follow the ball carrier. Jeff Kitts of GameSpot said that the players are slow, the weather options are poor, and penalties are unrealistic. CNET criticized the poor sound, graphics, lack of transactions (except for trades), and stated that every team has the same playbook. CNET also stated that game scores can peak into the 100s, and that players cannot get tired nor injured.

Reviews for the Saturn version were similar. GamePro wrote that "NFL Quarterback Club '97 reports to camp with notable graphical and gameplay improvements over its rookie outing." However, similarly to IGN, they found the game was outdone by the Saturn version of Madden NFL '97, which was being released at the same time and featured smoother graphics and responsive commentary. Next Generation likewise said the game is a huge improvement over the previous installment but still clearly inferior to Madden NFL '97, and additionally criticized that the Saturn version's colors are less bright than the PlayStation version's. However, they did say that the tackling mechanics are remarkably innovative and expressed hope that they would be imitated by other football games. Rich Leadbetter of Sega Saturn Magazine said the game is well-done in some respects, particularly the selection of plays and the ability to replay or create new situations, but "is out-gunned, out-quaffed and basically out-done in every way by EA's Madden '97" due to the below-average sprite scaling and animation, lack of PAL optimization, and unintuitive controls.
