= List of Mary-Kate and Ashley video games =

Mary-Kate and Ashley video games
- PAL version cover art for Magical Mystery Mall
- Genre: Various
- Developers: Crawfish Interactive; Powerhead Games; Tantalus Media; M4 Ltd. n-Space
- Publisher: Acclaim Entertainment (Note: Released under the Club Acclaim label)
- Creator: Acclaim Entertainment
- Platforms: Game Boy Color; PlayStation; PlayStation 2 Game Boy Advance; GameCube; Windows
- First release: The New Adventures of Mary-Kate & Ashley; December 16, 1999
- Latest release: Mary-Kate and Ashley: Sweet 16 - Licensed to Drive; October 2002

The Mary-Kate and Ashley games are a series of video games released between 1999 and 2002 that feature Mary-Kate and Ashley Olsen in various scenarios such as trying to solve crimes, caring for horses, or freeing a shopping mall from a curse. The games were released by Acclaim Entertainment on game systems including the Game Boy Color, PlayStation, PlayStation 2, Game Boy Advance, GameCube and Windows.

== Background ==
The origins of the Mary-Kate & Ashley video games originated from a South Park video game for the Game Boy Color developed by Crawfish Interactive in development in 1998. But was eventually cancelled due to South Park creators Matt Stone and Trey Parker stating that the game would not be fitting on the Game Boy Color as that console was marketed towards children. A year later in 1999, the unreleased game's engine and assets were reused for two additional Game Boy Color titles from Crawfish and Acclaim - Maya the Bee & Her Friends, based on the Maya the Bee franchise which was released in Europe, and The New Adventures of Mary-Kate and Ashley, based on Mary-Kate and Ashley Olsen and was released in North America, being the first of the various video games based on the duo.

== Video games ==
- The New Adventures of Mary-Kate & Ashley (1999, Game Boy Color)
- Mary-Kate and Ashley: Dance Party of the Century (1999, PC)
- Mary-Kate and Ashley: Get A Clue (2000, Game Boy Color)
- Mary-Kate and Ashley: Magical Mystery Mall (2000, PlayStation)
- Mary-Kate and Ashley: Pocket Planner (2000, Game Boy Color)
- Mary-Kate and Ashley: Winners Circle (2001, PlayStation, Game Boy Color)
- Mary-Kate and Ashley: Crush Course (2001, PlayStation, Game Boy Color, PC)
- Mary-Kate and Ashley: Girls' Night Out (2002, Game Boy Advance)
- Mary-Kate and Ashley: Sweet 16 – Licensed to Drive (2002, Game Boy Advance, GameCube, PlayStation 2)

== Reception ==
Reception for the games have been heavily negative, with the 1999 Game Boy Color game The New Adventures of Mary-Kate & Ashley receiving a score of 6/10 from IGN while the 2000 Magical Mystery Mall received one of 4/10. In contrast, the Telegraph praised the Pocket Planner as being "quite clever".

Mary-Kate and Ashley: Magical Mystery Mall sold 286,000 copies.

== Lawsuit ==
In 2004, the Olsen twins sued Acclaim because they claimed that Acclaim had not made payments on a settlement agreement. The settlement agreement came about because an audit of Acclaim's books showed that royalties due to the twins had not been paid. The lawsuit included a letter from the twins' attorney, Martin Singer, that stated that Acclaim had "taken the franchise of the Mary-Kate and Ashley brand in video games which had flourished and has now run it into the ground."
