= Madden Football 64 =

1997 video game

Madden 64
- North American Nintendo 64 cover art
- Developer: Tiburon Entertainment
- Publisher: EA Sports
- Series: Madden NFL
- Platform: Nintendo 64
- Release: NA: October 1997; PAL: December 1997
- Genre: Sports
- Modes: Single player, multiplayer

Madden Football 64 is a football video game. It was the first game of the Madden NFL series to be released for the Nintendo 64, as well as the first Madden game to be fully in 3D. Essentially an upgrade of Madden NFL 98 designed around the particular capabilities of the Nintendo 64, it replaced the 2D players with 3D models but lacked the full NFL licensing which was customary for the Madden series. While this lack of licensing significantly hurt critical response to the game, reviews were mostly positive, with elements such as the detailed player models and realistic gameplay garnering praise. The game has commentary by Pat Summerall and John Madden.

== License ==
Because Acclaim Entertainment had acquired exclusive rights to the NFL license for Nintendo 64 games for the remainder of the 1997 football season, this edition of Madden does not use real NFL team names or logos. Instead, the teams use banners that consist of two bars with the team colors, and the team name on top of them in white, accompanied by players in their uniforms. The Pro Bowl is referred to as the "Madden Bowl", and the Super Bowl as the "EAS Championship". However, the game does have a license with the NFL Player's Association, so real player names are present in the game.

Teams are referred to by city only, usually the city in which the real life team's stadium is located. The New England Patriots are referred to as "Foxboro", the Tennessee Oilers as "Nashville", the Arizona Cardinals as "Phoenix", the Minnesota Vikings as "Minneapolis", the Tampa Bay Buccaneers simply as "Tampa", the Carolina Panthers as "Charlotte", and at the time, a historic team, the Los Angeles Rams referred to as "Anaheim". Team uniforms are altered; all uniforms have white pants, helmet colors are often altered to be different from jerseys (only the Denver Broncos's home jersey and helmet are the same color), and even some already different colors are changed – Foxboro's helmet in this game is red, and Charlotte's is Carolina blue, when in real life both were silver.

== Development ==
Madden Football 64 had a short development cycle, since it was built as an upgrade of Madden NFL 98, retaining the essentials of that game's AI and features. Changes made from Madden 98 include the polygonal players, more colorful playcall screens, new end-zone celebrations and taunts, and removal of all full motion video clips. Development of the game began in early 1997.

The game was originally planned for release in 1998, but EA Sports bumped up the release date to early November 1997. Shortly before this date, the NFL complained that the game included all of the NFL's official team colors; EA Sports slightly delayed the game in order to change the colors.

== Reception ==
Reception

Review scores
Publication	Score
Electronic Gaming Monthly	8.5/10
GameSpot	8.6/10
IGN	7.8/10
N64 Magazine	92%
Next Generation	2/5

Madden Football 64 met with mostly positive reviews. Critics applauded the detailed player graphics, noting the discernible names on jerseys and black grease under their eyes, and the impressive animations. IGN added, "Surprisingly, making the jump to 3D has had no real downside for Madden 64 in terms of slowdown or glitches. The game moves as smoothly as its predecessors and looks a hell of a lot better." Despite the strong approval of the graphics, some questioned the use of polygons; several critics complained that players cannot wrap-tackle, instead bouncing off of each other as in sprite-based football games, and GameSpot noted that in the elevated camera view which the game is best played with, the graphics appear blocky. Kraig Kujawa of Electronic Gaming Monthly said that while the game is great, giving it a 9 out of 10, the polygonal players did cause slowdown, which together with the controls and lack of NFL licensing made him prefer the game's sprite-based equivalent, Madden NFL 98. Some reviews also noted that while competitor NFL Quarterback Club 98 runs in high resolution, Madden Football 64 does not.

However, Kujawa's co-reviewer Kelly Rickards opined that the game's issues with graphics and licensing are easily overridden by its gameplay. As with Madden NFL 98, reviewers were greatly pleased with EA's new "Liquid AI". The game's wide range of options and realism were also praised. GameSpot's reviewer ventured to say that "I've been a football fan for a long, long time, and I've never seen anything that resembles the NFL more than this game (and that's amusing, since this game doesn't even have an NFL license)." GamePro called it "Arguably the most fun football game ever created", giving it a 4.5 out of 5 for sound and a perfect 5.0 in every other category (graphics, control, and fun factor).

Next Generation was one of the few publications to not recommend the game, saying the lack of NFL licensing is an unforgivable flaw, and the analog control makes the game unbearably frustrating. They stated that "Despite its lack of merit as a serious football game, Madden 64 is the fastest-playing N64 football game around and as such is just slightly better than QBC 64 as an arcade game."

=== Sales ===
According to figures compiled through November 1997 from The NPD Group, Madden Football 64 came in ninth for video game sales, while its competitor NFL Quarterback Club 98 came in second.
