= RC de Go! =

1999 video game

- Developer: Taito
- Publishers: JP: Taito; WW: Acclaim Entertainment
- Platforms: Arcade, PlayStation
- Release: Arcade: JP: June 1999; PlayStation: JP: July 6, 2000; WW: November 9, 2000
- Genre: Racing
- Mode: Single-player
- Arcade system: Taito G-NET

RC de Go! is a racing video game developed by Taito, specifically a radio-controlled car simulator. First released to Japanese arcades in 1999 on Taito's G-NET hardware, it was later released for the PlayStation, with publishing in North America and PAL territories handled by Acclaim Entertainment. The game received generally positive reviews from video game critics, comparing it to RC Pro-Am.

== Gameplay ==
Gameplay screenshot

RC de GO! is a racing game. The player controls RC cars. It features different modes to play: single-race mode, championship mode, and time trials. The arcade version utilized RC-style controllers.

== Development ==
RC de GO! was developed by Taito based on the concept of Densha de Go!, and published by Acclaim Entertainment. It was shown at Taito's booth at the 2000 Tokyo Game Show.

In 2004, Acclaim sold all of their intellectual properties to publisher Throwback Entertainment after going bankrupt. In 2011, Throwback sold the Re-Volt IP to South Korean company We Go Interactive. The acquisition included RC de GO!.

== Reception ==
Reception

Aggregate score
Aggregator	Score
Metacritic	80/100

Review scores
Publication	Score
AllGame	3/5
GameSpot	7.5/10
IGN	8.4/10

In Japan, Game Machine listed RC de Go! on their August 1, 1999 issue as being the thirteenth most-successful arcade game of the month.

Previewing it at the Tokyo Game Show for IGN, Craig Harris spoke positive about the game, calling it "an absolute blast to play". Upon its release, RC de GO! received "generally favorable reviews" according to the review aggregation website Metacritic.

Nick Woods from Allgame, while calling it a "challenging and fun racing game", criticized its lack of a two-player mode. Miguel Lopez from GameSpot and IGN's David Smith compared the game to RC Pro-Am.

It won Runner-Up for Best Racing Game for PlayStation for IGN's best of 2000 awards, losing to Codemasters' Colin McRae Rally 2.0.
