= NFL Quarterback Club (video game) =

- Developers: Iguana Entertainment; Beam Software (Game Boy); Condor (Game Gear)
- Publisher: Acclaim Entertainment (Note: Released under the LJN brand name on Nintendo systems.)
- Composer: Rick Fox
- Series: NFL Quarterback Club
- Platforms: Game Boy, Sega Genesis, Game Gear, SNES, 32X
- Release: Game Boy: NA: November 1993; EU: 1993; Sega Genesis: NA: 1994; EU: February 24, 1995; SNES: NA: December 14, 1994; EU: February 24, 1995; Game Gear: NA: 1994; EU: 1995; 32X: NA: 1995; EU: 1995
- Genre: Sports
- Modes: Single-player, multiplayer

NFL Quarterback Club is an American football video game for multiple platforms that features quarterbacks from the NFL. It is the first game in Acclaim Entertainment's NFL Quarterback Club series.

The first game to use the name was a Game Boy title developed by Beam Software and released under Acclaim's LJN brand in 1993 that was a simulation of the NFL Quarterback Challenge. The following year, Acclaim and LJN released a new multiplatform title under the same name, adding options to play full team games under NFL rules, while retaining the Quarterback Challenge mode. The game was released for the Super NES, Genesis and Game Gear. A Game Boy version, called NFL Quarterback Club II and a 32X version were released in 1995. Both these versions omitted the Quarterback Challenge mode, a trend that would continue with NFL Quarterback Club 96.

== Home console versions ==
In 1994, NFL Quarterback Club was released for the SNES. The main appeal about the game is that it offers three different types of modes to play in, making it more like three games in one. Up to four different players can play at the same time.

The game takes its name from the "QB Challenge". Players can choose from more than 12 of the NFL's premier quarterbacks to take part in a competition. There are four events in the competition. These are Accuracy, The Obstacle Course, Distance and Read And Recognition. Accuracy involves throwing the ball toward targets. The Obstacle Course is a track where the quarterback must jump over hurdles and go around defenders. Distance competition involves throwing the ball as far as possible, while Read And Recognition is the same as Accuracy but only certain targets hold point values. The QB with the highest number of points at the end of all four events is the winner. Each event can also be played individually if a player chooses to do so. Custom quarterbacks can be created to take part in the challenge. As the quarterback improves, his skill level increases.

The second mode is "Play NFL" and features playing a regular football game. Options include preseason, regular season play and direct playoff entry. All NFL teams are available. The player can import custom quarterbacks into a team, and also has the option of substituting quarterbacks from different teams into it.

The third mode is "Simulation". There are 30 scenarios from previous games that a player must complete. Some scenarios have as little as ten seconds left in the game, while others begin with more than 15 minutes of playing time left.

== Game Boy version ==
The Game Boy version, also known as NFL Quarterback Club 95, simulated the NFL Quarterback Challenge and featured 13 quarterbacks, including Troy Aikman, Warren Moon, Jim Kelly and John Elway. Players select one of them and compete in four different events representing different quarterback skills: Speed and Mobility, Accuracy, Distance and Read and Recognition.

== Reception ==
Reception

Review scores
Publication	Score			
Publication	Game Boy	Game Gear	Sega Genesis	SNES
Electronic Gaming Monthly	N/A	N/A	15/20	15/20
Famitsu	19/40	19/40	26/40; 29/40 (32X)	26/40
Next Generation	N/A	N/A	3/5	N/A

GamePro gave the SNES version a positive review, and said the Speed & Mobility event is the game's "one weak feature". They praised the diverse range of modes, the camera views, the accessibility of the playbook, and the variety of moves the players can pull off. They panned the Game Gear version, however, criticizing that it removes key modes, features, and sound effects from the console versions, and pointing out that gamers looking for a football game for the Game Gear could get the superior Madden NFL '95. Reviewing the 32X version, they praised the new camera views but criticized the removed of the Quarterback Challenge skills contest and concluded that players who owned the Genesis or SNES versions had no need to get the game again. They also criticized the gameplay balance, commenting that "you can ferret out a handful of plays that make any club invincible. If you like scoring 90-plus points on the Cowboys or the Niners all the time, you'll love this cart!" A reviewer for Next Generation also highly praised the camera views feature, calling it "the future in sports games." However, he concluded, "The gameplay in 32X's Quarterback Club is far superior to its 16-bit counterparts, but the lack of a players license, and no individual statistics keep this game from being the groundbreaking title it may have been." He gave it three out of five stars.

Next Generation, reviewing the Genesis version, felt that its perceived lack of emphasis on the quality of the main gameplay in favor of the extra modes prevented the game from being a competitor with other, bigger sports games.
