= Speed Kings =

2003 video game

- Developer: Climax London
- Publisher: Acclaim Entertainment
- Platforms: GameCube, PlayStation 2, Xbox
- Release: GameCube & PlayStation 2: NA: 28 May 2003; EU: 4 July 2003; Xbox: NA: 3 June 2003; EU: 4 July 2003
- Genre: Racing
- Modes: Single-player, multiplayer

Speed Kings is a 2003 racing video game developed by Climax London and published by Acclaim Entertainment for GameCube, PlayStation 2 and Xbox.

== Gameplay ==
Speed Kings is an arcade-style motorcycle racing game. There are three single-player modes in Speed Kings and five multiplayer options. There are 22 bikes featured in the game based on real-world bike models. The gear and game equipment is authentic as well and is sponsored by Shoei and Alpinestars. Additionally, it includes hidden features based on rewards that can be unlocked during gameplay.

The game features racing through traffic-filled streets with multiple tricks, stunts, combat, and dangerous speeds. The street environments also feature moving traffic and destructible objects and the game supports a full deformation system, which illustrates real-time damage to the bike.

== Reception ==
Reception

Aggregate scores
Aggregator	Score		
Aggregator	GameCube	PS2	Xbox
GameRankings	63.60%	62.08%	65.06%
Metacritic	61/100	61/100	60/100

Review scores
Publication	Score		
Publication	GameCube	PS2	Xbox
Edge	6/10	6/10	6/10
Electronic Gaming Monthly	5.5/10	N/A	N/A
Eurogamer	N/A	5/10	N/A
Game Informer	7/10	6.5/10	7/10
GamePro	N/A	N/A	1.5/5
GameSpot	7.6/10	7.6/10	7.6/10
IGN	5.5/10	5.5/10	5.5/10
Nintendo Power	3.7/5	N/A	N/A
Official U.S. PlayStation Magazine	N/A	4/5	N/A
Official Xbox Magazine (US)	N/A	N/A	5.8/10
The Village Voice	6/10	N/A	N/A

Speed Kings was met with mixed reception. GameRankings and Metacritic gave it a score of 65% and 60 out of 100 for the Xbox version; 64% and 61 out of 100 for the GameCube version; and 62% and 61 out of 100 for the PlayStation 2 version.

GameSpot described the game as "a fairly traditional arcade motorcycle racing game with some unconventional gameplay elements." They also stated that the visual effects of the game "looks good" and the audio "has a decent array of sound effects and music." The publication later named it the best PlayStation 2 game of May 2003. IGN said, "We wouldn't exactly crown Acclaim's motorcycle racer as videogame royalty." Eurogamer complained that the textures were "bland and blurry" and the scenery leaves no "lasting impression". But the bikes and riders are "suitably detailed" and "the crashes look sufficiently bone-shattering." Eurogamer said it "isn't a terrible game - it's just that it's so easily ignored."
