= Bloodshot (1995 video game) =

- Mega Drive box art by Tom Carney
- Developer: Domark
- Publisher: Domark
- Producer: Jim Blacker
- Programmer: Jim Blacker
- Artist: Joe Groombridge
- Composer: Mike Ash
- Platforms: Mega Drive, Mega-CD
- Release: Mega Drive: EU: January 1995; NA: 1995 (Sega Channel); Mega-CD: EU: June 1995
- Genre: First-person shooter
- Modes: Single-player, multiplayer

Bloodshot, also released as Battle Frenzy in Germany and North America, is a 1995 first-person shooter video game developed and published by Domark for the Mega Drive and Mega-CD in Europe. A North American Genesis release was planned and even reviewed in gaming magazines, but was only released through the Sega Channel service.

== Gameplay ==
A gameplay screenshot of a level in progress

Bloodshot is a first-person shooter and maze game which can be played by either one or two players. The game consists of twelve levels. Players must fight their way from the starting point to the end of each level, where the plasma node is located. Once the node is destroyed, players must return to where they started the level before the time runs out. If players fail to escape, they will lose a life; if they have any lives left, they must destroy the node again before being given another attempt to escape.

The player's default weapon is a simple pulse reserve gun. Players can find one of ten special weapons scattered around the level. Each special weapon has a limited amount of ammo, and the player must obtain a new weapon to refresh the ammo; however, collecting a special ammo pickup will replenish the ammo for all of the weapons. The player cannot use the reserve gun if they have any special weapons. Areas in each level are separated by sliding doors, in which players can open unconditionally; some of the doors are locked, and players must find and use the passkeys to unlock them. The game features the on-screen map to help players navigate the level. The health is represented by an oxygen supply, which depletes whenever a hit from enemy fire or a mine is taken. A life is lost when the player's oxygen is emptied. Players start the game with three lives; the game is over when all the lives are exhausted. Extra oxygen and lives can be found throughout the maze.

The game features the bonus light system. When an enemy is killed, the light is lit on the bonus panel; when the player is taking a hit, the light is lost. When the three lights are lit, the player is awarded with bonuses, such as a complete oxygen bonus, extra weapons and an extra life. The levels include secret areas that are hidden behind sliding camouflaged wall panels and not shown on the on-screen map. Secret areas contain special weapons and other bonuses, as well as extra enemies. They can also act as a shortcut between parts of the level. Players can obtain special white passkeys either via the bonus light system or in concealed areas of the level. White passkeys can unlock white doors to rooms which contain weapons and other bonuses. Bloodshot also features a special head-to-head mode, in which two players face off against each other in one of three specially designed arenas.

== Plot ==
In the year 2049, the Earth moon base Yaz 67 is destroyed by an alien battlecruiser. The Earth Federation Starfleet Command retaliates by sending two of its own space battlecruisers against the alien ship with the goal of damaging the ship's defenses and taking as many prisoners as possible. When soldiers enter the battered alien ship, they find it completely controlled by robotic soldiers who outgun and outclass the boarding humans. The ship is eventually taken to Earth's orbit and human scientists successfully shut-off the alien robot crew using electromagnetic fields. However, when the scientists reactivate the cruiser's computers, they find an invincible space carrier containing even more robot soldiers and armed with extremely destructive Nova bombs is on its way to Earth. If the ship is disabled before it reaches Earth, then it is programmed to crash onto Earth's surface and detonate the bombs. The only way to completely destroy the carrier is to destroy its twelve plasma nodes. Once the plasma node is destroyed however, the entire deck the node is located on will explode.

A year later, the Earth Federation makes it their mission to board the carrier once it has entered the Solar System and destroy the ship from the inside. Players assume the role of the cybernetically enhanced trooper (starfleet elite marines) assigned to the mission, who has the special combat Battle Frenzy Chip implanted into them which gives the soldier an unstoppable desire to kill, a condition known as "Bloodshot".

== Reception ==
GamePro gave the Mega Drive version a mixed review. They praised the high tension level and the pressure of having to beat the clock, but cited a number of control problems, such as the imprecise aiming and the "sticky" walls which can easily cause the player to lose lives during the timed destruction sequences. Electronic Gaming Monthly scored the Sega CD version a 6.4 out of 10 but remarked that while it was a major improvement over the Mega Drive version, "as a derivative of the Doom theme, Battle Frenzy holds its own, but it just isn't anything special."

Next Generation reviewed the Genesis version of the game, rating it two stars out of five, and stated that "Battle Frenzy is a tough game, though the challenge doesn't come from nasty enemies, it comes from fuzzy graphics instead, no gunsight, and jerky control."
