= South Park: Chef's Luv Shack =

1999 game show-style party video game

- Developer: Acclaim Studios Austin
- Publisher: Acclaim Entertainment
- Designer: Jools Watsham
- Programmer: Ian Dunlop
- Artist: Gregg Hargrove
- Writer: David Eastman
- Composer: Nelson Everhart
- Series: South Park
- Platforms: Dreamcast, Microsoft Windows, PlayStation, Nintendo 64
- Release: Dreamcast: NA: November 18, 1999 (DC); EU: November 26, 1999; Windows, PlayStation: NA: December 1, 1999; EU: 1999; Nintendo 64: NA: December 8, 1999; EU: December 17, 1999
- Genre: Party
- Mode: Multiplayer

South Park: Chef's Luv Shack is a 2D game show-style party video game and is a sequel to the 1998 video game South Park, itself based on the American animated sitcom of the same name. Developed by Acclaim Studios Austin and published by Acclaim Entertainment, it was released in 1999 for the Dreamcast, Microsoft Windows, PlayStation and Nintendo 64. Its gameplay involves minigames and the ability to play against other players in a challenge for the most points. It also involves trivia questions about South Park and other topics.

South Park: Chef's Luv Shack was met with mixed to negative reviews. It is the second of three South Park video game titles developed by Acclaim after South Park in 1998 and preceding South Park Rally in 2000.

== Gameplay ==
Four possible answers are given during the question-and-answer portion of the game. Correct answers increase the score whereas incorrect answers lower it.

In the game, the player chooses from one of four characters: Eric Cartman, Kenny McCormick, Kyle Broflovski, or Stan Marsh in a game show hosted by Chef. The game intermittently switches between questions and minigames, with a minigame preceding every three questions. Players score points by correctly answering questions and minigame ranking. Players lose points for getting questions wrong. The game is exclusively multiplayer; when played by one player, there is no AI, so that player always wins, even with a negative score. Players have the option to "shaft" (pass on) a question to another player after choosing to answer the question. The "shafted" player can then pass the question on again or choose to answer the question. When "shafting", a question will always be answered by the last player to be "shafted".

Despite South Park: Chef's Luv Shack appearing on all the major home consoles at the time, the only instance of the game taking advantage of the then-modern hardware is the up-to-four player multiplayer game featured in the Nintendo 64 and Sega Dreamcast versions. The PlayStation version supports four players with an adapter, and the PC version allows two players to play with a keyboard and two more players to play with Joysticks.

== Reception ==
Reception

Aggregate score
| Aggregator | Score | | | |
| Aggregator | Dreamcast | N64 | PC | PS |
|---|---|---|---|---|
| GameRankings | 50% | 51% | 48% | 42% |

Review scores
| Publication | Score | | | |
| Publication | Dreamcast | N64 | PC | PS |
|---|---|---|---|---|
| AllGame | 2/5 | 2/5 | 3/5 | 1.5/5 |
| CNET Gamecenter | 4/10 | 4/10 | 5/10 | 4/10 |
| Computer Games Strategy Plus | N/A | N/A | 2/5 | N/A |
| Electronic Gaming Monthly | 4.75/10 (Note: Four critics of Electronic Gaming Monthly gave the Dreamcast version each a score of 5/10, 4.5/10, 5.5/10, and 4/10.) | N/A | N/A | N/A |
| EP Daily | 2.5/10 | 2.5/10 | 2.5/10 | 2.5/10 |
| Game Informer | 3.5/10 | N/A | N/A | 3.25/10 |
| GameFan | N/A | 83% (Note: In GameFan's viewpoint of the Nintendo 64 version, one critic gave it 89, and two others gave it each a score of 80.) (G.N.) 72% (L.B.) 60% | N/A | 61% |
| GameRevolution | C | N/A | C− | N/A |
| GameSpot | 3.9/10 | 3.9/10 | 4/10 | 3.9/10 |
| GameSpy | 4.5/10 | N/A | N/A | N/A |
| Hyper | N/A | N/A | N/A | 70% |
| IGN | 4.3/10 | 5.3/10 | 5.5/10 | 2.1/10 |
| Next Generation | 2/5 | N/A | N/A | N/A |
| Official U.S. PlayStation Magazine | N/A | N/A | N/A | 1/5 |
| The Sydney Morning Herald | 3/5 | 3/5 | 3/5 | 3/5 |

The Dreamcast and Nintendo 64 versions received mixed reviews, while the PC and PlayStation versions received unfavorable reviews. Blake Fischer of NextGen said of the Dreamcast version, "If you've already burned out on YDKJ, and you need some more game-show luvin', this is your only option, so you're stuck."

The Enforcer of GamePro said of the N64 version in one review, "If you're a fan of the show – which you almost have to be to answer a majority of the questions – you'll have a lot of fun with Luv Shack. Its whimsical comic take on the series makes for a fun time on a rainy Saturday afternoon." (Note: GamePro gave the Nintendo 64 version three 4.5/5 scores for graphics, sound, and control, and 4/5 for fun factor in one review.) In another GamePro review, Scary Larry said the same console version "will remain one of those few games that dedicated fans enjoy and deserve, and everyone else should avoid. There's no Luv here." (Note: GamePro gave the Nintendo 64 version all 3.5/5 scores for graphics, sound, control, and fun factor in another review.) Nash Werner said of the PC version, "So we're left with another South Park game that falls into the 'could've been better' category. Fans of South Park will love the audio quality and voice-overs done by Isaac Hayes. Pick it up if you must own everything South Park--it's fun for a few days." (Note: GamePro gave the PC version 2.5/5 for graphics, 4/5 for sound, 2/5 for control, and 3/5 for fun factor.) Tim Weaver of N64 Magazine gave it 83%, calling it "a triumph of simplicity and design, and offers a significantly different playing experience to Mario Party."
