= NFL QB Club 2002 =

2001 video game

- Cover featuring Brett Favre of the Green Bay Packers and Rich Gannon of the Oakland Raiders
- Developer: Acclaim Studios Austin
- Publisher: Acclaim Entertainment (Note: Released under the Acclaim Sports label)
- Series: NFL Quarterback Club
- Platforms: PlayStation 2, GameCube
- Release: PlayStation 2: NA: September 7, 2001; EU: October 12, 2001; GameCube: NA: December 20, 2001
- Genre: Sports
- Modes: Single-player, multiplayer

NFL Quarterback Club 2002, also known as NFL QB Club 2002, is a football video game developed by Acclaim Studios Austin and published by Acclaim Entertainment under their Acclaim Sports banner. It is the final game in Acclaim's NFL Quarterback Club series. A sequel was planned for Xbox, but cancelled.

Some of the game's key features are:

- NFL Quarterback Challenge mode, featuring four head-to-head events: Speed and Mobility, Accuracy, Long Distance Throw and Read & Recognition.
- Unlock retired players like John Elway, Dan Marino, Steve Young, Jim Kelly and Phil Simms
- 31 NFL clubs and over 1500 NFL players.
- Play-by-play from Kevin Harlan and color commentary from Bill Maas.
- Player models feature blinking eyes, jaw motions, facial expressions and removable helmets.
- Player injuries, penalties and weather conditions affect season play and individual player performance.
- 5 modes of play: Season, Exhibition, Challenge Mode, Playoffs, and Pro Bowl.

== Reception ==
Reception

Aggregate score
Aggregator	Score	
Aggregator	GameCube	PS2
Metacritic	53/100	67/100

Review scores
Publication	Score	
Publication	GameCube	PS2
Electronic Gaming Monthly	4.5/10	N/A
Game Informer	N/A	7.5/10
GameSpot	5.5/10	7.2/10
GameSpy	39%	N/A
GameZone	5.5/10	9/10
IGN	5.4/10	5.8/10
Nintendo Power	2.9/5	N/A
Nintendo World Report	3.5/10	N/A
PlayStation Official Magazine – UK	N/A	8/10
Official U.S. PlayStation Magazine	N/A	2.5/5

The game received "mixed or average reviews" on both platforms according to the review aggregation website Metacritic.
