= NBA All-Star Challenge =

1992 video game

- Super NES cover art
- Developer: Beam Software
- Publisher: Acclaim Entertainment (Note: Released under the LJN brand for Nintendo systems, and the Flying Edge brand for Sega Genesis.)
- Platforms: Super NES, Sega Genesis, Game Boy
- Release: Super NES: NA: December 1992; EU: 1993
- Genre: Sports (basketball)
- Modes: Single-player, multiplayer

NBA All-Star Challenge is a video game for the Super NES, the Game Boy, and the Sega Genesis.

== Summary ==
Larry Bird gets hit with a goaltending violation while blocking Reggie Miller's shot.

This game offers a chance to compete in one-on-one basketball with NBA superstars like Michael Jordan (Chicago Bulls), David Robinson (San Antonio Spurs), Larry Bird (Boston Celtics), and Patrick Ewing (New York Knicks). Every mode is multiplayer-capable in addition to being selectable for single-player gameplay.

Playing modes available to the players include: H-O-R-S-E, a free throw tournament, a shooting contest involving three-point shots, and a tournament where one NBA player will take on other NBA players for the ultimate prize. All fouls are called in this game, including minor fouls like goaltending. The winner of each match has a screen with a set of game statistics. Even the offer of a rematch is offered once a game is over.

Players are not chosen by name. Instead, they are chosen by their team (as of the 1991–92 NBA season). This may confuse fans who are unfamiliar of professional basketball from the late 1980s/early 1990s. Vital statistics related to gameplay are also included here like height, weight, the number of points that the player scores in a typical game, and accuracy in percentage for various shots.

== Ratings ==
Reception

Review score
Publication	Score
Mega	19%

The Dutch video game magazine Power Unlimited gave NBA All-Star Challenge an 80% rating in its January 1994 issue while the website Sega-16 gave the Sega Genesis version of the game a 20% rating in April 2009.

== Game Boy sequel ==
A sequel, NBA All-Star Challenge 2, was released in December 1993 exclusively for the Game Boy. Developed by Beam Software and published by Acclaim Entertainment under the LJN label, the gameplay is largely the same, the main change being the graphical enhancements from the original Game Boy game.
