= South Park Rally =

2000 kart-style racing video game

- Developer: Tantalus Interactive
- Publisher: Acclaim Entertainment
- Producer: Stephen Handbury
- Designer: John Szoke
- Artist: Rohan Westbury
- Composer: Yannis Brown
- Series: South Park
- Platforms: PlayStation, Microsoft Windows, Nintendo 64, Dreamcast
- Release: PlayStation: NA: January 5, 2000; EU: February 4, 2000; Windows: NA: January 24, 2000; EU: February 4, 2000; Nintendo 64: NA: February 28, 2000; EU: March 3, 2000; Dreamcast: NA: July 7, 2000; EU: July 28, 2000
- Genre: Kart racing
- Modes: Single player, multiplayer

South Park Rally is a kart-style racing video game released in early 2000 based on the American animated sitcom South Park published by Acclaim Entertainment (near the end of the third season of the show) and released for the PlayStation, Microsoft Windows, Nintendo 64, and Dreamcast. Gameplay follows the player in a competitive racing championship set in the fictional town of South Park. Players are given the options for multiplayer, arcade, or championship modes, but only the championship unlocks extra features. Competition begins in South Park's 1st Rally, a circuit race around four checkpoints in the downtown area of South Park. Races get gradually more diverse, with more locations, racers, and elements added as the game progresses.

Following South Park (1998) and South Park: Chef's Luv Shack (1999), the game's development was handled by Tantalus Interactive and includes characters, vehicles, locations, items and other features inspired by or featured on the series. It was developed simultaneously for all major consoles during the time of its release. Version differences include the number of unlockable characters and stages, with the Nintendo 64 version being on the low end of features due to hardware limitations.

South Park Rally received poor reviews from critics. Criticism derived from the differences between the two major home console ports, Nintendo 64 and PlayStation, as well as the general lack of innovation over other kart-style racers such as Mario Kart 64. South Park Rally would become the last South Park game by Acclaim Entertainment and the last home game in the franchise until South Park: The Stick of Truth in 2014. Series creators Trey Parker and Matt Stone would go on to ridicule Acclaim's games based on their series in later years. The game was only developed in 7 months, causing it to get mostly mixed reviews.

== Gameplay ==
The player using Eric Cartman in an early race through the town. Clockwise from top left: the player's ranking, available power-ups, the track's map, and the next objective.

Gameplay in South Park Rally is divided into three game modes: championship, arcade, and multiplayer. Up to 27 playable characters are available depending on which console version is played.

- Championship: The main focus of the game, which has 14 different races (additional races in the Dreamcast version), all of which have to be done in order. This is the only mode where characters and tracks can be unlocked.
- Arcade: A practice mode allowing the player to choose any unlocked character on any unlocked track to race.
- Multiplayer: A race allowing two to four players to choose any unlocked characters on any unlocked track and race.

The game features a diverse set of objectives in races that encourage player interaction. According to Acclaim Entertainment manager Thomas Bass, "Unlike other racing games where players avoid the other players in order to win, South Park Rally encourages interaction between players, which makes for some insane and wildly fun gameplay." Original voice actors Matt Stone, Trey Parker, Mary Kay Bergman, and Isaac Hayes provided dialog for the game.

== Plot ==
The Mayor of South Park has decided to stage a rally series that will take place through the heart and outskirts of the town. Favorite characters from the popular television series are included and are able to make use of destructive automobiles, including police cars, mini Porsches, Big Gay Al buggies, wheat bags, jeeps and dozens of other vehicles.

Characters who appear in power-up form include Mr. Hankey, Saddam Hussein, the Underpants Gnomes, Frida, Sparky and Kitty.

== Development ==
Development on the title – based on Tantalus' own concept – was done on three platforms simultaneously, and took seven months. The game was developed by 20 people. South Park Rally was the third video game based on the series, as Acclaim had also published the games South Park (1998) and South Park: Chef's Luv Shack (1999).

South Park creators Trey Parker and Matt Stone had little to do with the development of South Park Rally (as well as the two other Acclaim releases), although they did contribute a number of original lines of voice acting for it, as they do most of the voices on the show.

=== Marketing ===
South Park Rally's release was accompanied by television commercials, billboards, and print advertisements targeted at older audiences that carried sponsorships of both South Park and Comedy Central's The Man Show from December 1999 through January 2000.

== Reception ==
Reception

Aggregate score
Aggregator	Score			
Aggregator	Dreamcast	N64	PC	PS
GameRankings	45%	43%	47%	45%

Review scores
Publication	Score			
Publication	Dreamcast	N64	PC	PS
CNET Gamecenter	4/10	4/10	3/10	N/A
Computer Gaming World	N/A	N/A	3.5/5	N/A
Electronic Gaming Monthly	3/10	3/10 (Note: In Electronic Gaming Monthly's review of the Nintendo 64 version, one critic gave it 2/10, another gave it 4/10, and the remaining two gave it each a score of 3/10.)	N/A	N/A
Game Informer	N/A	4.5/10	N/A	4.5/10
GameFan	N/A	48% (Note: Three critics of GameFan gave the Nintendo 64 version each a score of 48, 41, and 55.)	N/A	40%
GameRevolution	D	N/A	D+	N/A
GameSpot	2.5/10	2.6/10	3.3/10	3.9/10
GameSpy	5/10	N/A	N/A	N/A
IGN	4.2/10	5.7/10	4.9/10	3/10
Next Generation	2/5	2/5	N/A	N/A
Nintendo Power	N/A	7.3/10	N/A	N/A
Official U.S. PlayStation Magazine	N/A	N/A	N/A	1.5/5
PC Accelerator	N/A	N/A	3/10	N/A
PC Gamer (US)	N/A	N/A	20%	N/A

South Park Rally received negative reviews on all platforms according to the review aggregation website GameRankings. Greg Orlando of NextGen's March 2000 issue said of the Nintendo 64 version, "Someone shoehorned the South Park license onto a rather (pardon the pun) middle-of-the-road cart-racing game. Rent it if you must, but buy it only if Messrs. Stone and Parker really need to put down payments on solid-gold houses." Six issues later, Jeff Lundrigan said that the Dreamcast version "would make an amusing rental for a party. Otherwise, steer clear."

Mark Green of N64 Magazine gave the Nintendo 64 version 88%, saying that it "has innovation, excitement, and just about every South Park character ever, all rolled into one package." Kevin "BIFF" Giacobbi of GameZone gave the PC version eight out of ten, saying that it was, "For those South Park fans... definitely a title worth adding to your collection." Cam Shea of Hyper gave the PlayStation version 49%, saying, "As wacky as throwing Chef's Salty Chocolate Balls at someone may sound, it really isn't very exciting watching a blob of brown fired at a mess of pixels." Lou Gubrious of GamePro said of the same PlayStation version, "Playing South Park Rally will probably cause pain in most gamers. The worst pain comes from knowing that this game wastes a potentially great concept because of flawed execution." (Note: GamePro gave the PlayStation version two 2.5/5 scores for graphics and control, 3.5/5 for sound, and 2/5 for overall fun factor.) The Freshman stated similarly that the Nintendo 64 version "just seems like a shameless attempt to tack South Park's name on a bad racing game to make it sell. With bland graphics, random and repetitive sound samples, and frustrating control, this game gets stomped easily by the much better kart-racers on N64. Unless you love everything with the South Park name, you'd be best advised to take the bypass and skip the town of South Park entirely." (Note: GamePro gave the Nintendo 64 version 3/5 for graphics, 3.5/5 for sound, 2.5/5 for control, and 2/5 for overall fun factor.)

AllGame gave the Nintendo 64 and PC versions each a score of three-and-a-half stars out of five, with Joe Ottoson saying of the former, "If you're a fan of the Mario Kart brand of racing games out there, South Park Rally puts up an entertaining race. South Park fans probably won't be disappointed either as the powerups and sound effects are all nicely twisted so that they mock all that is pure and good in a small town's holiday celebrations"; and Cal Nguyen saying of the latter, "While South Park Rally has its moments, most racing fans will probably be reluctant to get downright serious with this game, provided they can even muster passing the first race! However, South Park, go-kart and comedy fans will no doubt enjoy the humor and simple gameplay for what it is, 'mmm'kay?'" However, Steve Bauman of Computer Games Strategy Plus gave the latter two stars out of five, calling it "a charmless little mess, a superficially fun-looking game with fun-killing gameplay."

Over time, Parker and Stone have publicly criticized Acclaim and the quality of the games as well.

== Sales ==
The game sold more than 1 million copies on the Nintendo 64 alone.
