= Star Voyager =

1986 video game

- North American cover art
- Developer: ASCII Corporation
- Publishers: JP: ASCII Corporation; NA: Acclaim
- Composer: Mitsunori Ogihara
- Platform: Nintendo Entertainment System
- Release: JP: December 23, 1986; NA: September 1987
- Genre: Action
- Mode: Single-player

Star Voyager, released in Japan as Cosmo Genesis (コスモジェネシス), is an action video game developed and published by ASCII Corporation for the Nintendo Entertainment System in 1986. The North American version was published by Acclaim Entertainment in 1987. The gameplay is a first-person shooter from inside the cockpit of a spaceship. The player navigates "sub spaces" of a larger "world map." Gameplay takes place between different subspaces.

== Gameplay ==
The plot centers around a lone pilot in a spacecraft attempting to protect a transport ship, the CosmoStation Noah, full of planetary refugees from a fleet of intergalactic terrorists known as the Molok Wardrivers. The player's primary goal is to eliminate all enemy fleets before they can surround the stationary Cosmostation Noah. The player may also visit up to eight different planets in search of engine and weapon upgrades for their ship, may seek repairs at up to five space stations in addition to CosmoStation Noah, and may also visit an asteroid field, and a black hole from which escape is difficult but not impossible. The game is won if the player defeats the enemy armada and safely returns to base. However, the game is lost if the enemy fleet reaches the CosmoStation Noah, the player enters the black hole, the player's ship runs out of fuel crystals, or if life support fails.

Gameplay occurs on a 10x10 grid that is randomized at the start of each game with the exceptions of the player and CosmoStation Noah which will always begin in the top left, and the five initial Molok Wardriver fleets will begin in the bottom right. To progress through the grid, the player must select their destination coordinates either through the HUD or the select menu grid, and hold down the B button to charge enough power to travel to as many sectors as required to reach their destination, as identified by the number on the bottom-center of the HUD. The number of leaps charged is indicated by icons in the upper-left gauge.

As gameplay progresses, additional fleets may join the Molok Wardriver armada. Any space stations they encounter during their trek to the CosmoStation Noah will be destroyed, limiting the resources the player will have to mount an attack. In order to destroy the enemy fleets, the player must warp to their coordinates and destroy the fleet's spacecraft and mothership, which will endlessly deploy enemy spacecraft as long as it remains operational. The player must raise their shields in the select menu in order to minimize damage taken to the ship.

The player's fuel crystals will deplete normally over time, and faster during warping or sustaining damage. Therefore, it is necessary to visit space stations to refuel to prolong gameplay. They can also repair damaged systems which include radar, engines, and weapons, but a malfunctioning life support system can be repaired only at the CosmoStation Noah. Depending on the amount of damage taken, the engines may become inoperable, one or both laser cannons can malfunction, and radar can become difficult to use.

== Reception ==
Computer Entertainer recommended Star Voyager and said that despite the "relatively simple" graphics, the gameplay was engaging, requiring "careful planning, flying, and shooting" to complete.
