= Mary-Kate and Ashley: Sweet 16 – Licensed to Drive =

2002 video game

- North American GameCube cover art
- Developers: n-Space (GameCube and PS2); Powerhead Games (GBA)
- Publisher: Acclaim Entertainment (Note: Released under its Club Acclaim label)
- Producers: Bob Hichborn; Tonya Hurley
- Composer: Ron Fountenberry
- Platforms: Game Boy Advance, GameCube, PlayStation 2
- Release: October 2002
- Genre: Party
- Modes: Single-player, multiplayer

Mary-Kate and Ashley: Sweet 16 – Licensed to Drive is a 2002 turn-based party video game published by Acclaim Entertainment under its Club Acclaim label. The game was released for the PlayStation 2, GameCube and Game Boy Advance. n-Space developed the game for the PS2 and GameCube whereas Powerhead Games developed the game for GBA.

It was the final installment to the Mary-Kate and Ashley video game franchise; although, another game, Mary-Kate and Ashley in ACTION!; based on the twins' animated television series, was scheduled for release in 2003 but was ultimately canceled due to Acclaim's poor financial status.

== Gameplay ==
=== GameCube and PlayStation 2 ===
In the GameCube and PlayStation 2 versions of Mary-Kate and Ashley: Sweet 16 – Licensed to Drive, players can control one of four characters: Mary-Kate, Ashley, Tiffany, or Clair. Players can choose between two regions, beach and mountain. The three game modes are Adventure, Bring It On, and Arcade.

In Adventure mode, players go around the selected region for three laps by default, but players may choose to extend the game up to ten laps. As players go around the region, they land in spaces where they can pick up friends, receive coins, or participate in challenges. After each lap, players compete in one of the 30 mini-games to earn points. Players also compete in mini-games if they: land on the same space; or, pick up a friend which is already riding with another player. In the first case, the winner gets the space and the loser is pushed back one. In the second case, the friend rides with the winning player.

In Bring it On mode, there are no regions and players compete in mini-games. The first player to win three mini-games wins the game. Playtime can be extended by setting the required wins to five, seven, or nine.

In Arcade mode, a single mini-game can be selected. Winning this game mode yields no results.

=== Game Boy Advance ===
While the story is the same as the GameCube and PlayStation 2 versions, the Game Boy Advance version changes the genre to that of a driving game. The game is split into the same game modes as the main console releases but the only characters available for play are Mary-Kate and Ashley, there are only seven mini-games, and there is one map, which is that of a town. The main goal is to drive around to all the checkpoints before the timer runs out with optional destinations that reward the player with points. When the player finishes a level, they are rewarded with a letter grade.

== Lawsuit ==
In 2004, the Olsen twins sued Acclaim because they claimed that Acclaim had not made payments on a settlement agreement. The settlement agreement came about because an audit of Acclaim's books showed that royalties due to the twins had not been paid. The lawsuit included a letter from the twins' attorney, Martin Singer, that stated that Acclaim had "taken the franchise of the Mary-Kate and Ashley brand in video games which had flourished and has now run it into the ground."

== Reception ==
Reception

Aggregate scores
Aggregator	Score	
Aggregator	GBA	GameCube
GameRankings	49.00%	55.75%
Metacritic	N/A	49/100

Review scores
Publication	Score	
Publication	GBA	GameCube
AllGame	N/A	3/5
IGN	4.0/10	5.0/10
Nintendo Power	14.5/20	14.5/20

The GameCube version of Mary-Kate and Ashley: Sweet 16 – Licensed to Drive received "generally unfavorable reviews" according to review aggregator Metacritic. It has 55.75% on Game Rankings based on four reviews. In their review for IGN, Chris Roper and rated the GameCube version a 5/10, saying that while the game was "reasonably entertaining" when played with a group of friends and Matt Casamassina was "best suited for existing young fans of Mary-Kate & Ashley", the game was a "clear Mario Party clone with the Olsen twins license slapped on for good measure" and that it was better to stick with the superior inspiration. Nintendo Power found the game was "appropriate for players young and old" but that its major flaw was an "overall absence of Mary-Kate and Ashey's [sic] charismatic personalities"

The Game Boy Advance version of the game received 49% on Game Rankings based on two reviews. IGN called this version "not much of a game" since there was "only one city to explore and one easy race course to play." They additionally criticised its graphics.
