= NFL Quarterback Club =

- Platforms: Game Boy; Genesis; Game Gear; Super NES; 32X; Saturn; MS-DOS; PlayStation; Nintendo 64; Dreamcast; PlayStation 2 GameCube
- First release: NFL Quarterback Club; 1993
- Latest release: NFL QB Club 2002; 2001

NFL Quarterback Club is an American football video game series that was published by Acclaim beginning in 1993.

In 2018, the franchise was acquired by Liquid Media.

== Games ==
- NFL Quarterback Club
- NFL Quarterback Club 96
- NFL Quarterback Club 97
- NFL Quarterback Club 98
- NFL Quarterback Club 99
- NFL Quarterback Club 2000
- NFL QB Club 2001
- NFL QB Club 2002

A 2003 game was in development, but cancelled.
