= NFL QB Club 2001 =

2000 video game

- N64 cover featuring Brett Favre
- Developer: High Voltage Software
- Publisher: Acclaim Entertainment (Note: Released under the Acclaim Sports label)
- Series: NFL Quarterback Club
- Platforms: Dreamcast, Nintendo 64
- Release: NA: August 24, 2000
- Genre: Sports
- Modes: Single-player, multiplayer

NFL QB Club 2001, also known as NFL Quarterback Club 2001, is an American football game for the Nintendo 64 and Dreamcast. Part of the NFL Quarterback Club series, it is the last title in the series to be released for the N64 and DC. The game follows in the footsteps of the previous three titles on both consoles, with a full on NFL football simulation with all the teams, players and stats. The game cartridge was red, unlike the usual gray color for N64 cartridges.

== Game modes ==
Modes include Exhibition, Season, Practice & Pro Bowl, with the option for players to play past NFL Super Bowl games or create their own custom simulation.

== Custom options ==
The player can also create their own team and players, a full play book, and sign or trade players pre-season.

== Reception ==
Reception

Aggregate score
Aggregator	Score	
Aggregator	Dreamcast	N64
Metacritic	44/100	57/100

Review scores
Publication	Score	
Publication	Dreamcast	N64
CNET Gamecenter	2/10	2/10
Electronic Gaming Monthly	N/A	2.5/10
Game Informer	2.5/10	4/10
GameFan	70% (Note: In GameFan's viewpoint of the Dreamcast version, one critic gave it 69, and the other gave it 71.)	N/A
GamePro	N/A	3/5 (Note: GamePro gave the Nintendo 64 version two 4/5 scores for graphics and sound, 2.5/5 for control, and 3/5 for overall fun factor.)
GameSpot	4.7/10	4.6/10
GameSpy	N/A	54%
IGN	3/10	5.8/10
Nintendo Power	N/A	7.5/10

The Nintendo 64 version received "mixed" reviews, while the Dreamcast version received "generally unfavorable reviews", according to the review aggregation website Metacritic.
