= Tee Off =

1999 video game

- Developer: Bottom Up
- Publishers: JP: Bottom Up (Note: Published and rereleased by Softmax by under the name of Golf Shiyō Yo Guide Pack on June 1, 2000.); INT: Acclaim Entertainment
- Platform: Dreamcast
- Release: JP: December 9, 1999; INT: January 12, 2000; Guide Pack: JP: June 1, 2000
- Genre: Sports
- Modes: Single-player, multiplayer

Tee Off, known in Japan as Golf Shiyō Yo (ゴルフしようよ, Gorufu Shiyō Yo), is a video game developed and published by Bottom Up and Acclaim Entertainment in 1999-2000.

== Reception ==
Reception

Aggregate score
Aggregator	Score
GameRankings	70%

Review scores
Publication	Score
AllGame	2.5/5
CNET Gamecenter	6/10
Eurogamer	8/10
Famitsu	28/40
Game Informer	6.25/10
GameFan	(F.M.) 74% (E.N.) 71%
GamePro	3.5/5
GameRevolution	C+
GameSpot	7.1/10
GameSpy	7/10
IGN	7.8/10

The game received average reviews according to the review aggregation website GameRankings. In Japan, Famitsu gave it a score of 28 out of 40.
