= RC Revenge =

2000 video game

- Developer: Acclaim Studios Cheltenham
- Publisher: Acclaim Entertainment
- Platforms: PlayStation, PlayStation 2
- Release: PlayStation: NA: August 17, 2000; EU: September 1, 2000; PlayStation 2: EU: December 1, 2000; NA: January 10, 2001
- Genre: Racing
- Modes: Single-player, multiplayer

RC Revenge is a racing video game released for the PlayStation in 2000, developed by Acclaim Studios Cheltenham. It is set in 5 different movie worlds (Horror World, Planet Adventure, Jungle World, AKLM Studios and Monster World) in which the player races remote controlled cars across many varied tracks. It is a sequel to Re-Volt (1999).

== Gameplay ==
There are four game modes in RC Revenge: championship mode, single race, time trial, and multiplayer race. RC Revenge has boat and race car effects and an options mode where the player can see the credits, track records, adjust music and sound volumes, brightness, and more. The gameplay was revised from Re-Volt to be more arcade-based and like other kart racers at the time. Cars can still flip over like in Re-Volt. Like Re-Volt, the game also features a basic track editor where players can create their own courses or play randomly generated tracks which can also be edited. There are multiple weapons, some of which return from Re-Volt, that are obtained via a floating blue icon.

== Development ==
The game was originally developed under the names of Re-Volt 2, Re-Volt 2: Pocket Rockets and Re-Volt 2: RC Revenge, but the name was changed simply to RC Revenge for the final release. The original name is still used for the Memory Card block when the game is saved onto the Memory Card.

It was the first title developed by Acclaim's Cheltenham development studio.

== RC Revenge Pro ==
RC Revenge Pro is an enhanced port of RC Revenge released for the PlayStation 2 in December 2000 in Europe and January 2001 in North America, once again developed by Acclaim Studios Cheltenham. The game features improved graphics, sound and framerate, as well as the same vehicles as the original.

Additions to this version include dynamic animations within the environments that were not present in the race tracks originally, as well as the addition of a new Pirate World with 4 new tracks and 4 new vehicles. The Track Editor was also updated to feature small themed elements based on the game's 6 worlds to be added to the player courses (e.g. Horror World themed signposts).

== Reception ==
Reception

Aggregate score
Aggregator	Score	
Aggregator	PS	PS2
Metacritic	72/100	49/100

Review scores
Publication	Score	
Publication	PS	PS2
AllGame	2.5/5	2/5
CNET Gamecenter	8/10	N/A
Electronic Gaming Monthly	4/10	6.5/10
EP Daily	7/10	6.5/10
Famitsu	25/40	22/40
Game Informer	5.5/10	5.5/10
GameSpot	7.3/10	5.7/10
IGN	7.8/10	2.5/10
Jeuxvideo.com	15/20	13/20
Next Generation	4/5	2/5
Official U.S. PlayStation Magazine	3.5/5	2.5/5
Maxim	N/A	6/10

RC Revenge received "average" reviews, while the Pro version received "generally unfavorable reviews", according to the review aggregation website Metacritic. John Gaudiosi of NextGen said of the original, "Fun for gamers of all ages, this kid-friendly game serves up some serious racing challenges." Tom Russo of the same magazine later said that the Pro version was "Not without some merit, but there are far better uses for your new $300 hardware." In Japan, where the original game was ported and published by Acclaim Japan on November 9, 2000, followed by the Pro version on June 28, 2001, Famitsu gave it a score of 25 out of 40 for the former, and 22 out of 40 for the latter.

The Freshman of GamePro said, "RC Revenge could have been a bit better, had the control been tighter and the tracks more interesting, but as it is, you're better off playing any of the myriad mascot kart-racers out there. In the end, RC Revenge proves that sometimes, vengeance is best not served at all." (Note: GamePro gave the PlayStation version two 2.5/5 scores for graphics and control, and two 2/5 scores for sound and fun factor.) Later, Extreme Ahab said of the Pro version, "In this case, 'RC' stands for 'really crappy.' Unless you truly enjoy subpar courses, low-grade weapons, ho-hum racing, and pre-Newtonian physics, you should probably avoid the lifeless RC Revenge Pro." (Note: GamePro gave the PlayStation 2 version 3.5/5 for graphics, and three 2/5 scores for sound, control, and fun factor.)
