= Mary-Kate and Ashley: Pocket Planner =

2000 video game

- Developer: Powerhead Games
- Publisher: Acclaim Entertainment (Note: Released under the Club Acclaim label)
- Platform: Game Boy Color
- Release: NA: November 21, 2000
- Genres: Digital planner, Minigames
- Mode: Single-player

Mary-Kate and Ashley: Pocket Planner is a digital planner and video game developed by American studio Powerhead Games and published by Acclaim Entertainment. It was released on November 21, 2000, for the Game Boy Color. It is part of the Mary-Kate and Ashley video game series. The user can keep track of the time and take notes while also playing through a number of minigames. Mary-Kate and Ashley are featured extensively throughout the planner. Reception was mixed, with criticism focused on the shortcomings of the game and its gendered focus and content while praising its clever features.

== Gameplay ==
One of the menu screens of the game

Pocket Planner is a digital planner which allows users to organize their lifestyles. The game features a calendar, stop watch, phone book, and a series of five short minigames that allow the user to get photos of Mary-Kate and Ashley. The game includes a "Crush Tester" which prompts the player to point the Game Boy at their crush which checks if the feelings are reciprocated and a fortune teller. The Game Boy Printer can be used to print out photos of Mary-Kate and Ashley that are unlocked by playing the minigames. The player can send G-Mail (presumably, email for girls) between users through the Game Boy Color's infrared port. Every screen includes at least Mary-Kate or Ashley though at the Game Boy's low resolution.

== Reception ==
Reception

Review score
Publication	Score
IGN	7.0/10

Critical reception was mixed, focusing on the game's shortcoming as an actual game and its gendered focus and content. The Telegraph called it "quite clever" and noted its variety of features. IGN, in a mostly sarcastic review, noted that the organizer doesn't beep during upcoming events (as you can't keep the Game Boy Color on at all times) and felt that the game was missing a number of features. Acclaim Entertainment posted a profit in 2001 that was in part attributed to the success of its Mary-Kate and Ashley video game series, including Pocket Planner.
