= NFL Quarterback Club 2000 =

1999 video game

- N64 cover featuring Brett Favre
- Developer: Acclaim Studios Austin
- Publisher: Acclaim Entertainment (Note: Released under the Acclaim Sports label)
- Series: NFL Quarterback Club
- Platforms: Nintendo 64, Dreamcast
- Release: Nintendo 64: NA: August 26, 1999; EU: September 24, 1999; Dreamcast: NA: November 29, 1999; EU: December 10, 1999
- Genre: Sports
- Modes: Single-player, multiplayer

NFL Quarterback Club 2000 is a sports video game developed by Acclaim Studios Austin and published by Acclaim Entertainment for Nintendo 64 and Dreamcast in 1999.

== Reception ==
Reception

Aggregate score
Aggregator	Score	
Aggregator	Dreamcast	N64
GameRankings	29%	49%

Review scores
Publication	Score	
Publication	Dreamcast	N64
AllGame	2.5/5	1.5/5
Electronic Gaming Monthly	2.5/10 (Note: Two critics of Electronic Gaming Monthly gave the Dreamcast version each a score of 3/10, and two others gave it each a score of 2/10.)	2.5/10 (Note: Two critics of Electronic Gaming Monthly gave the Nintendo 64 version each a score of 3/10, and two others gave it each a score of 2/10.)
Game Informer	2.25/10	5/10
GameSpot	2.4/10	5.9/10
GameSpy	2/10	N/A
IGN	2/10	6/10
N64 Magazine	N/A	60%
Next Generation	1/5	N/A
Nintendo Power	N/A	7.3/10
Player One	25%	N/A

The game received unfavorable reviews on both platforms according to the review aggregation website GameRankings. Blake Fischer of NextGen called the Dreamcast version "A half-hearted effort with too many flaws to be considered worthy of play against the NFL 2K football juggernaut." Dr. Zombie of GamePro said that the Nintendo 64 version "just doesn't measure up to Madden NFL 2000. If for some reason you find yourself Madden-less, it might be worth a rental." (Note: GamePro gave the Nintendo 64 version 4.5/5 for graphics, 4/5 for sound, 3.5/5 for control, and 3/5 for fun factor.)
