= Re-Volt =

1999 video game

- Developer: Acclaim Studios London
- Publisher: Acclaim Entertainment
- Designers: Paul Phippen; Simon Harrison
- Platforms: Arcade; Windows; Nintendo 64; PlayStation; Dreamcast; iOS
- Release: Windows, Nintendo 64, PlayStation: NA: 18 August 1999; EU: 3 September 1999; Dreamcast: NA: 17 December 1999; EU: 2 August 2000; Re-Volt Classic; 4 October 2012
- Genre: Racing
- Modes: Single-player, multiplayer

Re-Volt is a 1999 racing video game developed by Acclaim Studios London and published by Acclaim Entertainment. It was released for Microsoft Windows, Nintendo 64, PlayStation and Dreamcast.

The premise of the game involves racing radio-controlled cars around environments like museums, steamships, construction sites and supermarkets. During a race the cars can collect random weapons to use to displace competitors. Cars and tracks were both unlocked through success in the game's tournament modes.

== Game modes ==
- Single Race - Allows the player to race against computer opponents for first place. Completing races associated with a cup unlocks one new car. This game mode is available in multiplayer mode for up to four players to race against each other.
- Championship - Racing in a cup which consists of four races for points. The higher the rank, the more points earned. However, the player is required to finish in 3rd or better to advance to the next race; failing to do so costs a try, and after three tries have depleted, the championship ends. Obtaining first in a cup unlocks additional levels and cars.
- Time Trial - This game mode lets the player compete for the fastest lap time in any race that is unlocked. Beating the challenge time of tracks associated with a cup unlocks reverse, mirror and reverse mirror variations of those tracks.
- Practice - Allows the player to explore tracks with no time limit or other racers. In addition, each track features a star to collect. Collecting each star from a track associated with a cup unlocks two new cars.
- Stunt Arena - A small arena features 20 stars to collect. The arena features a loop, ramps as well as a half pipe with stars that can only be obtained with higher performing cars. Collecting all 20 stars unlocks a game mode.
- Battle Tag - A multiplayer only mode that features a star hidden in a battle level. Collecting the star counts down a timer for a player. The first player to have their timer reach zero is the winner. The game continues until the last person fails to collect the star.
- Clockwork Carnage - Instead of 8 RC cars racing to the finish, it is a 30 wind-up car race to the finish in any of the race levels.

== Ports and re-releases ==
=== Car Editor ===
In October 1999, Acclaim Entertainment released the Re-Volt Car Editor which allowed players to export and edit, or create new cars for the PC version using 3D studio. The editor was simply discovered in the Acclaim Studios London office and as such was released as an unapproved and unsupported piece of code.

=== Xbox beta version ===
An Xbox version called Re-Volt Live was in development with a very limited beta version distributed to closed beta testers. This stripped-down version of Re-Volt was issued to beta testers of the Xbox Live service prior to the launch of the service on the original Xbox system, but much to the disappointment of fans - a more complete version was never released on the Microsoft console. The full game was cancelled close to being finished. Even though it was not officially released, the full development version is available and can be played on a modified Xbox that is capable of running games from a storage device.

=== Arcade version ===
In September 2004, under license from Acclaim, Tsunami Visual Technologies released a version of the game for arcades. This version used a modified version of the PC version's engine, running on Windows 98-based hardware and came in two cabinet variants, standard sit-down and deluxe motion.

Similar to the Dreamcast version's Time Trial mode and many other arcade racers, there is a global timer. This version also featured additional tracks, among those the fan-made Venice by Gabor and a new track created by Kurt Arnlund, an ex-Tsunami employee.

=== Mobile device ports ===
In July 2010, WeGo Interactive Co., Ltd., located in Seoul, South Korea, purchased all intellectual properties related with Re-Volt, RC Revenge Pro, and RC de Go (developed and owned by Taito), from Toronto-based Throwback Entertainment.

In July 2012, the company announced that they would partner with the game's lead designer and producer, Nick Baynes, to release an iOS and Android version of the game developed under the latter's studio Big Bit, which consisted of himself and former staff at Black Rock Studio. The versions were due for release in September and October, respectively. We Go announced on the same day that they would release a Smart TV version of the game. The iOS version, named Re-Volt Classic, was released in October 2012 while the Android version was released on April 24, 2013, initially on the Korean T-Store before a later release on the Play Store.

In September 2013, We Go released a freemium version of the game for Android devices, titled Re-Volt 2: Best RC 3D Racing. It later saw an iOS release in July 2014 as Re-Volt 2: Multiplayer. The game's servers would shut down in July 2017.

In June 2016, We Go released another freemium version of the game known as Re-Volt 3, initially being released in select territories before seeing a wide release in November.

=== PC re-release ===
On October 3, 2013, the PC version of Re-Volt was re-released through digital distribution on GOG.com. The release was based on the community developed 1.2 Beta patch, with additional support for the original CD tracks as MP3 files. The game was pulled on request from the developers of the 1.2 Beta patch in January 2014 due to a misunderstanding with publishers WeGo Interactive, in which the company used parts of the code written by the community without due consent.

Following the closure of WeGo Interactive, the rights to the title transitioned to a new company called Superday Inc., which was made up of ex-WeGo staff. Through Korean publisher H2 Interactive, the PC version was relisted on GOG.com in April 2022, which reverted the game back to the original 1.0 version of the game. This version of the game was released on Steam on 29 July 2022, which also includes Steam Workshop.

== Legacy ==
A sequel, RC Revenge, was released in 2000 for the PlayStation and PlayStation 2. It was also known as Re-Volt 2.

Although Acclaim Entertainment has been defunct since 2004, fans continued to support and extend the game by producing fan-made vehicles and courses, and by operating multiplayer servers. Fans have created an open-source, cross-platform chat/lobby client called "RV House" that allows players to connect and play online. This platform is directly interconnected to the website "Revolt Race ", in which, among other features, a monthly set of tracks is chosen to serve as the base for time trialing. Additionally, more recently the community has set up a Discord channel that serves as the major hub to talk about the game, host, advertise and join races, share content/mods or even help develop new tools and updates for the game - the latest iteration consists of RVGL, a cross-platform rewrite/port of Re-Volt's source code that runs natively on both Windows and Linux.

While new players may experience a significant learning curve, the community remains active with records of fastest laps and new courses and cars still being added. The fan-base have gone on to maintain the PC version with alpha and beta updates. The game was also ported by the fan community to multiple platforms such as Linux, macOS, Android, ODROID, and OpenPandora based on the available source code.

== Reception ==
Reception

Aggregate scores
Aggregator	Score				
Aggregator	Dreamcast	iOS	N64	PC	PS
GameRankings	79%	62%	60%	77%	47%
Metacritic	N/A	62/100	N/A	N/A	N/A

Review scores
Publication	Score				
Publication	Dreamcast	iOS	N64	PC	PS
CNET Gamecenter	8/10	N/A	7/10	9/10	4/10
Computer Gaming World	N/A	N/A	N/A	4/5	N/A
Electronic Gaming Monthly	N/A	N/A	5.625/10 (Note: Three critics of Electronic Gaming Monthly gave the Nintendo 64 version each a score of 6/10, and another one gave it 4.5/10.)	N/A	N/A
Eurogamer	9/10	N/A	N/A	N/A	N/A
Game Informer	5/10	N/A	4.75/10	N/A	3.25/10
GameFan	70%	N/A	(A.C.) 84% 69% (Note: In GameFan's viewpoint of the Nintendo 64 version, three critics gave it each a score of 80, 60, and 66.)	80%	(J.W.) 70% 52% (Note: In GameFan's viewpoint of the PlayStation version, three critics gave it each a score of 48, 50, and 59.)
GameSpot	5.3/10	N/A	5.1/10	6.5/10	4.9/10
IGN	8.7/10	N/A	4.8/10	8.8/10	6.1/10
Next Generation	4/5	N/A	N/A	(Oct.) 4/5 (Sep.) 3/5	N/A
Nintendo Power	N/A	N/A	7/10	N/A	N/A
Official U.S. PlayStation Magazine	N/A	N/A	N/A	N/A	2/5
PC Accelerator	N/A	N/A	N/A	6/10	N/A
PC Gamer (US)	N/A	N/A	N/A	88%	N/A
Pocket Gamer	N/A	3/5	N/A	N/A	N/A

The PC and Dreamcast versions received favourable reviews, and the Nintendo 64 version and Re-Volt Classic received mixed reviews, while the PlayStation version received unfavourable reviews, according to the review aggregation websites GameRankings and Metacritic. Mark Clarkson of Computer Gaming World praised the PC version's graphics and environments, and realistic RC-like handling, although he noted that the in-game map editor was poor. Vincent Lopez of IGN praised the same PC version's graphics, the gameplay and interface, but criticised the game's track editor. Rick Sanchez of NextGen's September 1999 issue called the same PC version "a fun romp, but if it had taken its toy inspiration over the top, this could have been excellent." An issue later, however, Jeremy Willams said, "Those with a bit of patience will find Acclaim's Re-Volt to be a very accurate little R/C simulator, and a rewarding game." Five issues after that second review, Greg Orlando said of the Dreamcast version, "An excellent, albeit lighthearted, racing game, Re-Volt is best experienced with a group." In Japan, where the PlayStation version was ported for release on 6 January 2000, followed by the Dreamcast version on 13 July, Famitsu gave it a score of 30 out of 40 for the latter, and 23 out of 40 for the former.

Nick McElveen of Computer Games Strategy Plus gave the PC version four stars out of five, saying, "Although steering wheels and joysticks work well with Re-Volt, console-racing nostalgists will quickly conclude that a gamepad is the most effective controller. Unfortunately, given Re-Volt's addictive gameplay, this may portend the return from remission of thousands of cases of 'Nintendo thumb.'" Brad Cook of AllGame gave the same PC version three stars out of five, saying, "While Re-Volt is a beauty to look at, it will unfortunately tax any but the biggest and best PCs out there." However, he gave the Dreamcast version two-and-a-half stars out of five, saying, "The developers at Acclaim Studios London probably thought they were on the right track when they decided to make the game adhere to the laws of physics in every mode of play, but they weren't. I would have preferred an Arcade mode that was just for fun and a simulation mode that required better attention to physics. If they could have set the game up that way, it probably could be on its way to classic status right now instead of bargain bin nominee." Scott McCall gave the Nintendo 64 version two stars out of five, saying that it was "missing the most important ingredient of any game: fun. And let's see, the frame rate is terrible, the environments are too large for four measly cars, and pick-ups don't increase the intensity level. The search continues for a spiritual successor to R.C. Pro-Am. Avoid." Christopher Michael Baker also gave the PlayStation version two stars, saying, "It's hard to think of nice things to say about Re-Volt, so I won't strain my brain. It might best be described in one word as revol... no, I won't subject you to that horrible pun. Just take my advice and spend your money on another game."

N64 Magazine gave the Nintendo 64 version 73%. Vicious Sid of GamePro called the same Nintendo 64 version "a nearly unbeatable choice for N64 racing fans." (Note: GamePro gave the Nintendo 64 version three 4/5 scores for graphics, control, and overall fun factor, and 4.5/5 for sound in one review.) However, Uncle Dust said in another review, "With so many other quality and fun racing titles available on the N64, it is definitely a good idea to avoid Re-Volt for N64." (Note: GamePro gave the Nintendo 64 version two 2/5 scores for graphics and overall fun factor, 3/5 for sound, and 2.5/5 for control in another review.) The same author later said of the Dreamcast version, "While the much improved graphics give you extra incentive to win more races, many gamers will still be turned off by the annoying physics and control. Hardcore R/C fans will love it and Dreamcast owners who are still looking for a solid racer may want to give it a try." (Note: GamePro gave the Dreamcast version 4/5 for graphics, 3/5 for sound, and two 3.5/5 scores for control and overall fun factor.) Air Hendrix, however, said of the PC version, "Overall, Re-Volt is equal parts fun and frustration. If you're a talented twitch gamer with a high tolerance for frustration, give it a try. But poor controls, driving surfaces as slick as your neighborhood bowling alley, and a limited view had me howling in mental agony every time I stepped on the gas." (Note: GamePro gave the PC version 4.5/5 for graphics, 3.5 for sound, 1.5/5 for control, and 2.5/5 for overall fun factor.)

Johnny B. of GameRevolution gave the PC version a B+, saying that it "may have tracks and cars that let you get more air and bounce basketballs, but underneath it's still just a fairly typical arcade racer." Another author of the same website also gave the Dreamcast version a B+, saying that it was "definitely one of those games that racing fans need to pick up. Of course, its difficulty will have gamers with weak hearts running for the hills. But for those of you with the patience to learn, Re-Volt offers a thoroughly enjoyable experience." Kevin Bowen of PlanetDreamcast gave the same Dreamcast version 8.5 out of 10, saying, "Sure, the Dreamcast already has a bunch of racing games, but Re-Volt is unquestionably unique. The difficulty level and somewhat spotty frame rate are really the only significant flaws. It's a solid game with a lot to offer, both in single and multiplayer modes, and in some ways [it] is even better than real R/C racing."

Spanner Spencer of TouchArcade gave Re-Volt Classic three stars out of five, saying, "It's certainly not the most interesting revival we've ever seen, and neither does it forge any new ground in terms of a standalone iOS title. I'd never accuse it of being a bad game — far from it — but it's simply too pedestrian to get remotely excited about (that's a bit of a pun to finish things off, and at no extra charge)."

The PC version sold 16,528 units in the U.S. during 1999.

The staff of PC Gamer US awarded the same PC version their 1999 "Best Racing Game" prize, and praised it as "an exceptional balance of realism and arcade thrills". It received a special achievement prize for "Sleeper Hit of the Year" from Computer Gaming World, whose staff wrote that it "surprised the hell out of us when it was released this past Fall". The game was also nominated for the magazine "Racing Game of the Year" award, but lost in this category to Need for Speed: High Stakes. It was also nominated for CNET Gamecenter's "Best Arcade Game" award, which went to Rayman 2: The Great Escape. The game was a runner-up for "Best Graphics, Technical Excellence" at GameSpot's Best & Worst of 1999 Awards, which went to Quake III Arena.

== See also ==
- List of vehicular combat games
