= NFL Quarterback Club 96 =

1995 video game

- SNES cover featuring San Francisco 49ers quarterback Steve Young
- Developers: Iguana Entertainment; Condor (Game Boy, Game Gear)
- Publisher: Acclaim Entertainment
- Series: NFL Quarterback Club
- Platforms: Sega Saturn, Genesis/Mega Drive, Game Boy, Game Gear, Super NES, MS-DOS
- Release: NA: October 27, 1995; PAL: 1995
- Genre: Sports (American football)
- Modes: Single-player, multiplayer

NFL Quarterback Club 96 is an American football video game released in 1995. The game was released on the Sega Saturn, Genesis, Game Boy, Game Gear, MS-DOS, and Super Nintendo Entertainment System. The game's cover features San Francisco 49ers quarterback Steve Young passing while being tackled by Chicago Bears defensive linemen Chris Zorich and Albert Fontenot. The Saturn, Genesis, Super NES and MS-DOS versions were developed by Iguana Entertainment, while the Game Boy and Game Gear edition was developed by Condor

== Gameplay ==
The game has 32 offensive plays and 16 defensive plays. The simulation modes include Preseason, Playoffs and Season, where one plays a season of 18 games. Another playable mode is the Quarterback Challenge, where players take control of a quarterback and compete against other quarterbacks in the league in various competitions, such as distance, mobility, obstacle, and accuracy. Players can save their game via passcodes. As the game has the National Football League license, all 30 teams are represented in the game, and players can perform transactions between teams, as well as player substitutions. The game also features the no huddle offense, three camera angles, penalties, three possible clock speeds, weather conditions, player reports, replays, and pre-game shows.

== Reception ==
Reception

Review scores
| Publication | Score |
|---|---|
| AllGame | 3/5 (GEN) |
| Next Generation | 4/5 (GEN) |
| Maximum | 4/5 (SAT) |
| Sega Saturn Magazine | 84% (SAT) |

The game received mixed to positive reviews. Reviewing the Genesis version, Next Generation commented that where the previous year's Quarterback Club had suffered from having no players' license or tracking of stats, Quarterback Club '96 fixed those problems and ranked alongside Madden NFL '96 and Prime Time NFL '96 as one of the best football simulators. They criticized the graphics but felt that the passing mechanics were better than in any other football video game, due to the ability to "actually drop back in the pocket and wait for an open receiver." GamePro judged it a great game in most respects, citing the comprehensive stats, broad camera view, sharp sprites, voicing, Hyper Audibles feature, and "intelligently constructed" practice mode. However, they felt the weak opponent A.I. even at the highest difficulty level to be a crippling flaw which, while amusing in some respects, would turn off hardcore football gamers. They later reviewed the Super NES version, saying that it "essentially mirrors the Genesis game with a similarly offensive-minded A.I. but slightly slower player speed." They again discussed the weak A.I. but was more forgiving of it this time, recommending that players use the competitive multiplayer mode. Next Generation reviewed the Genesis version of the game again, rating it three stars out of five, and stated that "Quarterback Club '96 is, in essence, your average football game. Not brilliant, not bad."

Reviewing the Saturn version, Rob Allsetter of Sega Saturn Magazine praised the multiple camera angles and the multi-player mode, criticized the miraculously perfect enemy teams in one-player mode, and concluded "while it sticks trenchantly to the familiar 16-bit formula, it is nevertheless an expansive and entertaining game." Maximum commented that the graphics of the Saturn version are significantly improved from the "16-bit versions" and that the historic mode is very innovative. They concluded that "you can't deny that Acclaim have managed to include just about everything needed to make American football, well, American football. It also plays very smoothly too, and manages to be entertaining without being too fussy." GamePro strongly objected to the game's depiction of professional football, commenting that "QB Club '96 has so many careless errors that its creators appear unfamiliar with football." They further criticized the "jerky" player control and slowdown. They acknowledged that the gameplay is "decent" and has a large number of modes and features, but ultimately chose to not recommend the game.

GamePro also reviewed the never-released PlayStation version. They said it has cleaner graphics than the Saturn version and praised features such as the ability to switch quarterbacks between teams. However, they criticized the design and AI, and concluded, "Despite the decent features and graphics, QB Club lacks solid, addicting gameplay."

Allgame gave the Genesis version 3 stars out of 5, praising the Quarterback Challenge, but criticized the simulation modes, commenting that the graphics, design and point of view are very weak.
