= NFL Quarterback Club 98 =

1997 video game

NFL Quarterback Club '98
- North American Nintendo 64 cover art featuring Brett Favre with the Green Bay Packers team
- Developer: Iguana Entertainment
- Publisher: Acclaim Entertainment (Note: Released under the Acclaim Sports label)
- Producer: Peter Wanat
- Programmer: Richard Cowie
- Artist: Tami Crabb
- Composer: Darren Mitchell
- Series: NFL Quarterback Club
- Platform: Nintendo 64
- Release: NA: October 24, 1997; EU: December 1997
- Genres: Sports, American football
- Modes: Single player, multiplayer

NFL Quarterback Club '98 is a football video game, released in 1997. It was developed by Iguana Entertainment and published by Acclaim Entertainment under their Acclaim Sports banner for the Nintendo 64. It was the first football game announced for the Nintendo 64.

The game established an advantage over its competitors by being the first Nintendo 64 game with high resolution graphics and holding exclusive NFL licensing for the console. Despite this, reviews were mixed as the game drew criticism for its lengthy floating of the ball during passes and issues with the A.I.

== Features ==
There are two kinds of Simulation modes, Custom and Historic. Custom Simulation mode allows one to create one's own scenario, including both teams' scores, who possesses the ball, how much time is left, and where the team with possession of the ball is on the field. Historic Simulation mode contains fifty different scenarios, based on games that happened in history, and a certain task is to be accomplished, often to "change history" and win with the team that lost the game, but sometimes to replicate a team's victory.

Another feature found in the game allows one to create a player. The game allows one to enter information such as the player's position, name, jersey number, height, weight, dominant hand, skin color, and age. After filling out this information, the user is taken may customize the player's stats, such as accuracy and range (for kickers and quarterbacks), catching abilities, agility, speed, and strength (all for numerous players). After a player is created, he is put into Free Agency, where he must be signed by a team.

Players can also create a team, using color schemes of the 30 NFL teams found in the game. Teams' playbooks, stadiums, and initials (shown next to a team's score during gameplay) can be edited, and a team may contain up to 55 players. Players can be put onto any of the 30 teams already in the game, as well as Free Agents (including created players), and can be substituted into any position. Due to a glitch, any free agents whom the player signs turn into "M. Clark", shirt number 84, who is not a real NFL player; an Acclaim representative said that there is no workaround for this glitch.

In addition to the 30 pro teams in the game, there were also four hidden teams, accessed by entering a cheat code. Two teams, AFC and NFC, are the Pro Bowl teams from 1997. The other two teams are based on Iguana Entertainment and Acclaim, the developer and publisher of the game respectively, and feature then-employees as members of the team. Iguana Entertainment and Acclaim's teams are the two best teams statistically in the game.

There is a season mode where players can select a team and play through their 1997 schedule. There is also a playoff mode where a player can select a team and try to guide them through the playoffs. Quarterback Club '98 also features a Quarterback Profile feature. This feature contains 30 quarterbacks, one from each team, and their college and pro football achievements in encyclopedic format.

The game's commentary was done by Marv Albert. Brett Favre was the chief spokesperson for the game.

== Development ==
The game was in development for more than 13 months. Acclaim brought the NFL Quarterback series into the 64-bit age using technology they had been working on for several years for Turok: Dinosaur Hunter. With this, they were able to keep the game running at 30fps in high-resolution (640 x 480), something that had not yet been done in the U.S. They obtained the full NFL license, including all the teams, stadiums and rosters. Their competitor for the N64 that year, Electronic Arts' Madden Football 64 was not able to get the NFL license in time for the game's release as Acclaim had acquired all the licenses for that year, but the game did feature real player names as it did get a license from the league's players' association that year. As a result, NFL Quarterback Club 98 is the only football video game for the Nintendo 64 to be fully licensed by the NFL in 1997.

Adrian Murrell served as the actor for the game's motion capture. A number of the plays in the team playbooks were designed by Brett Favre.

A version of the game was in development for the Sega Saturn, but was cancelled as part of Acclaim's withdrawal of support for that console. PC and PlayStation versions were also planned but never released.

One month before the game's release, its play-by-play commentator Marv Albert pled guilty to a misdemeanor charge of sexual assault and battery. Though a morals clause in Albert's multigame contract with Acclaim allowed Acclaim to dissolve the relationship if Albert were ever convicted of a crime, Acclaim opted to ship the game with Albert's commentary intact. An Acclaim representative explained that the game had already gone into production by the start of Albert's trial and was in the final stage of manufacturing when he entered his guilty plea, and said if the game were successful enough to merit a second manufacturing run, the company would re-evaluate its position on the inclusion of Albert's commentary.

== Reception ==
=== Reviews ===
Reception

Aggregate score
Aggregator	Score
GameRankings	76%

Review scores
Publication	Score
CNET Gamecenter	9/10
Consoles +	90%
Edge	7/10
Electronic Gaming Monthly	7/10, 7.5/10, 7.5/10, 7.5/10
Game Informer	5/10
GameFan	85%
GameRevolution	A−
GameSpot	5.4/10
Hyper	82%
IGN	7.8/10
N64 Magazine	86%
Next Generation	3/5
Nintendo Power	8.2/10

NFL Quarterback Club '98 received mixed reviews. Critics esteemed it for being the first Nintendo 64 game with high-resolution graphics, in many cases noting how this enabled a high level of detail on the players. IGN elaborated, "Players have realtime shadows, noticeable breath in frigid weather, and detailed uniforms and helmets." Next Generation said the high resolution "effectively takes away that nasty N64 blur we've all become accustomed to." However, critics widely opined the game's good visuals are outweighed by gameplay issues, specifically that the A.I. is easily exploited and often unrealistic, and passes float in the air for an inordinate length of time, even bullet passes. GameSpot explained the problem: "Because of this hang time, defenders have way too much time to close in. The ball often drops down in the middle of about three defenders that shouldn't have been there, and one wide receiver that should have been wide open. As the ball reaches the players, they all jump up to catch it, in what looks like synchronized volleyball. What's more amusing is that somehow the receiver still makes the catch. This happens so often that it seems like it was done on purpose to compensate for the game engine's shortcomings."

Several critics also remarked that the audio is dry and sparse, and overall fails to provide an NFL atmosphere as compelling as other football video games of the time. They particularly said that Marv Albert's voice-overs were interesting solely for his then-recent sex scandals, as his actual commentary is remarkably dull. Even the game's visuals were not exempt from criticism, as many cited poor animation and odd player models with disproportionate arms. However, IGN instead praised the animation as fluid and realistic, and said the game's flaws are overall too minor to prevent the game from being recommended. The inclusion of full NFL licensing was widely praised.

Next Generation stated that "In the end, serious football fans may want to stick with Quarterback Club 64 [sic] for its realism, but the slow play is likely to drive gamers crazy." Electronic Gaming Monthly's four reviewers instead argued that problems such as the poor AI and slow passes would inevitably irritate football devotees, while casual players were more likely to overlook these flaws and therefore enjoy the game. GameSpot similarly concluded, "To be fair, some gamers will enjoy Quarterback Club despite its shortcomings - but only if they don't know or care about realistic football." GamePro called it "Probably the most disappointing sports game of the year", remarking that while it had enough good qualities to satisfy hardcore football fans, there was no reason to prefer it over its competitor, Madden Football 64. They gave it a 4.5 out of 5 for graphics but a 3.0 for both control and sound, and a 2.5 for fun factor.

The game was nominated for the "Best Nintendo 64 Game" award at the CNET Gamecenter Awards for 1997, which went to Diddy Kong Racing. During the inaugural Interactive Achievement Awards, the Academy of Interactive Arts & Sciences nominated NFL Quarterback Club '98 for "Console Sports Game of the Year" and "Outstanding Achievement in Software Engineering", which went to International Superstar Soccer 64 and GoldenEye 007, respectively.

=== Sales ===
Despite the mixed reviews, NFL Quarterback Club 98 beat competitor Madden Football 64 in sales; according to figures compiled through November 1997 from The NPD Group, NFL Quarterback Club 98 came in second for video game sales while Madden Football 64 came in ninth. The game sold over 900,000 copies worldwide.
