= South Park (video game) =

1998/1999 first-person shooter video game

- Developers: Iguana Entertainment; Appaloosa Interactive (PS)
- Publisher: Acclaim Entertainment
- Producer: David Dienstbier
- Designers: Jeff Everett; Neill Glancy
- Programmer: Carl Wade
- Artist: Peyton Duncan
- Composer: Darren Mitchell
- Engine: Turok 2: Seeds of Evil (modified)
- Platforms: Nintendo 64, Microsoft Windows, PlayStation
- Release: Nintendo 64: NA: December 21, 1998; EU: May 3, 1999; Microsoft Windows: NA: March 1, 1999; EU: March 5, 1999; PlayStation: NA: September 30, 1999; EU: 1999
- Genre: First-person shooter
- Modes: Single-player, multiplayer

South Park is a first-person shooter video game based on the American animated sitcom of the same name. The game was developed by Iguana Entertainment with a modified version of the engine used in the Acclaim Entertainment-published Turok 2: Seeds of Evil. Both games shared the same publisher and were released for the Nintendo 64 in December 1998 in North America, and for Microsoft Windows in 1999. South Park was released in Europe and ported to the PlayStation (port developed by Appaloosa Interactive) in the latter year to coincide with the film South Park: Bigger, Longer & Uncut.

While the Nintendo 64 version reception was fairly indifferent, the PC and PlayStation versions of South Park received generally negative reviews. Acclaim later released two further games based on the series: South Park: Chef's Luv Shack in 1999 and South Park Rally in 2000, both of which received similar unfavorable reception.

== Gameplay ==
The player uses snowballs to attack turkeys in an early level.

South Park is a first-person shooter, a decision that was made due to Acclaim having access to the engine used to make Turok 2: Seeds of Evil. The single player mode puts the player in control of one of the four main characters of South Park (Cartman, Kyle, Stan or Kenny). The player must defeat a variety of enemies using weapons found throughout each stage in order to reach the exit.

In addition to completing levels, the player must also prevent large enemies in the stage (dubbed 'Tanks') from reaching the exit before they do. If they fail to do so, they will be forced to defend South Park from the 'Tanks' in a short minigame called the 'Penalty Round' after the stage.

=== Multiplayer ===
In Head-to-Head mode, the players select a level, characters, and game style (time-limited, damage limited, or unending). The Microsoft Windows version allows for online head-to-head play.

In the PlayStation and Nintendo 64 versions, upon reaching select stages in single player mode, codes are revealed. These can then be input into the "Cheesy Poofs Decoder" to unlock additional characters for Head-to-Head play. All characters are unlocked in the Microsoft Windows version.

In the Nintendo 64 version, the player can choose between 20 characters and 17 multiplayer levels, while on the PlayStation version, only two players can play and are limited to six multiplayer levels and 20 characters. The Microsoft Windows Version adds four new levels titled Mustard Block, Sartin Dippity!, Tabun Dance, and Soman Go!. Four extra characters were also added in the Microsoft Windows version: Shelly, Satan, Jesus, and Santa.

== Premise ==
A mysterious comet is approaching the earth, described by the opening narration as a force of concentrated evil that no bastion of decency can stand against. As it comes closer, South Park is beset by enemies, including rabid mutant turkeys, deformed clones of the townsfolk, alien visitors, berserk robots, and sentient killer toys. Stan, Kyle, Cartman and Kenny hear about the dangers from Chef, and take up arms to investigate their sources and defend the town.

== Development ==
Acclaim Entertainment announced in early 1998 that it had acquired the license to produce PC and console video games based on South Park, and anticipated that it would start releasing such games in 1999. Iguana Entertainment developed South Park in six months using their game engine from Turok 2: Seeds of Evil.

== Reception ==
Reception

Aggregate score
Aggregator	Score
GameRankings	(N64) 67.11% (PC) 51.72% (PS) 41.22%

Review scores
Publication	Score
AllGame	(PC) 3.5/5 (N64) 2.5/5 (PS) 2/5
Edge	(N64) 4/10
Game Informer	(N64) 7/10
GamePro	(PS) 4/5 (N64) 3/5 (PC) 2.5/5
GameRevolution	(N64) C−
GameSpot	(N64) 5.8/10 (PC) 4.1/10 (PS) 1.4/10
IGN	(N64) 6.2/10 (PC) 4.5/10 (PS) 2/10
Next Generation	3/5
Nintendo Power	7.5/10
PC Accelerator	(PC) 4/10
PC Gamer (US)	40%

South Park's critical reception was marginally contingent on the platform upon which it was released, but it mostly saw unfavorable reviews. The PC and PlayStation versions were widely panned, while the Nintendo 64 version was received slightly more positively. For the former two versions, criticism mainly stemmed from its poor graphical audio presentation. For all versions, the voice clips were criticized for repetition. Aggregating review website GameRankings gave the Nintendo 64 version 67.11%, the PC version 51.72% and the PlayStation version 41.22%.

Next Generation reviewed the PC version of the game, rating it three stars out of five, and stated: "once the initial chuckles wear off, whether in multiplayer or single-player mode, you're left with a first-person shooter much like any other, and in fact, not as well-designed as most. It's as fun as the show it's based on, but its appeal is just as fleeting."

GameSpot gave the PlayStation version a 1.4/10, stating: "South Park is definitely one of those games that is bound to come up when you start thinking about the worst game you've ever played." IGN called the PlayStation version "frustrating" due to poor graphics, repetition of the voice acting, and lack of play value for the head-to-head mode. GameSpot stated of the PC version: "A good license and good graphics aren't enough." The voice acting, done by the original voice actors, was criticized for being repetitive, isolated, and old. The weapons of the game were also criticized for being unprofessional.

Despite the negative reception from the Windows and PlayStation versions, the Nintendo 64 version was praised for its 3D graphics and storyline, with IGN calling the game "just as funny as the Comedy Central series." GameSpot stated in the Nintendo 64 version that the level design was "really not very good on its own, but given the license, it at least makes sense."

The game was commercially successful. By June 1999, the Nintendo 64 version had shipped nearly one million units worldwide. By October 1999, South Park had sold over one million units.

== Cancelled sequels ==
A sequel, tentatively titled South Park 2, was announced at the time of the release of the first South Park game, with a prospective 2000 release date. However, it was cancelled prior to release, instead focusing on cheaper, simpler releases in the franchise like South Park: Chef's Luv Shack (1999) and South Park Rally (2000).

A separate followup in the style of a sandbox action-adventure game was in development for the PlayStation 2, GameCube and Xbox, but also went unfinished and unreleased. Little was known about the game until a build was found on an Xbox development kit. No playable version has been released, though video footage has leaked onto the internet, including a cutscene showing Cartman in a mental hospital.
