= Turok (disambiguation) =

Turok is a fictional American comic book character.

Turok or Turoc may also refer to:

== Arts and entertainment ==
- Turok (video game series), a series of first-person shooter video games based on the Turok comic book character
  - Turok: Dinosaur Hunter, 1997 video game
  - Turok: Battle of the Bionosaurs, 1997 video game
  - Turok 2: Seeds of Evil, 1998 video game
  - Turok: Rage Wars, 1999 video game
  - Turok 3: Shadow of Oblivion, 2000 video game
  - Turok: Evolution, 2002 video game
  - Turok (video game), 2008
- Turok: Son of Stone (film), 2008 film

== Other ==
- Turok (surname)

== See also ==
- Turiec (disambiguation)
