= Dinosaur Hunter (disambiguation) =

Dinosaur Hunter is a 1996 video game.

Dinosaur Hunter or Dinosaur Hunters may also refer to:

- Dennis the Menace: Dinosaur Hunter, a 1987 TV film
- Dinosaur Hunters, a 1996 National Geographic documentary about the 1990s AMNH expeditions led in the Gobi Desert by paleontologists Mike Novacek and Mark Norell
- Turok: Dinosaur Hunter, a 1997 video game
- Turok: Dinosaur Hunter, a 1993 comic book series on which the video game was based
