= Turok: Rage Wars (GBC video game) =

1999 video game

- Developer: Bit Managers
- Publisher: Acclaim Entertainment
- Designer: Rubén Angel Gómez
- Programmers: Ricardo Fernández Gil; Daniel Lopez; Isidro Gilabert; Nacho García
- Composer: Alberto Jose González
- Series: Turok
- Platform: Game Boy Color
- Release: NA: November 23, 1999; UK: November 1999
- Genres: Action, shooter
- Mode: Single-player

Turok: Rage Wars is an action video game developed by Bit Managers and published by Acclaim Entertainment for the Game Boy Color handheld console in 1999. Although the game is set in the same universe as its Nintendo 64 counterpart, it is a different game. The game received generally favorable reviews from critics.

== Gameplay ==
Turok: Rage Wars is an action game that is presented from a top-down perspective. To progress through the game, the player must control Turok through four large worlds while battling enemies with multiple weapons. Each world consist of multiple levels and some levels feature forced scrolling. Weapons can also be upgraded or combined to produce different effects. The game employs a password system to prevent the loss of progress. Although the game is set in the same universe as its Nintendo 64 counterpart, it features a different storyline. The story of the game follows Turok as he prevents Dinosoids and Bionosaurs from reaching the Earth through dimensional portals.

== Development ==
Turok: Rage Wars was developed by the Spanish video game company Bit Managers and published by Acclaim Entertainment. Unlike Bit Manager's previous Turok game Turok 2: Seeds of Evil, which features a 2D side-scrolling engine, Turok: Rage Wars uses an entirely new engine which allows players to move and jump in eight directions. The music of the game was composed by Alberto Jose González, who also produced the music of the previous Game Boy Color Turok games.

== Reception ==
Reception

Aggregate score
Aggregator	Score
GameRankings	64%

Review scores
Publication	Score
GameSpot	6.7/10
IGN	7/10
Nintendo Power	7.4/10
Nintendo Acción	93/100
Nintendo, Le Magazine Officiel	72%

Turok: Rage Wars received generally favorable reviews from critics. Craig Harris of IGN described it as "a decent action game" that is better than its two predecessors and highlighted the game's new perspective, noting that the fact that the player can move in any direction "gives the game a lot more variety than just a simple run and jump game", but he criticized the weapons for being unbalanced. Nintendo Power praised the game's graphics for details, use of color and quality animations. Similarly, Miguel Lopez of GameSpot felt that "the levels look suitably lush and alive", but also admitted that the enemy characters did not look as great as the game's other elements.

In a very positive review, the Spanish official Nintendo magazine, Nintendo Acción, praised its extensive environments and varied arsenal of weapons, but noted that the controls have minor issues when the player moves diagonally. The French official Nintendo magazine praised the variety of the environments, which range from snow to jungles and deserts, but criticized the game's short length, stating that Turok: Rage Wars can be completed in a few hours.
