= Turok 3: Shadow of Oblivion (GBC video game) =

2000 video game

- Developer: Bit Managers
- Publisher: Acclaim Entertainment
- Composer: Alberto Jose González
- Series: Turok
- Platform: Game Boy Color
- Release: NA: July 27, 2000; EU: September 8, 2000
- Genres: Action, shooter
- Mode: Single-player

Turok 3: Shadow of Oblivion is an action video game developed by Bit Managers and published by Acclaim Entertainment. It was released for the Game Boy Color handheld game console in 2000 alongside its Nintendo 64 counterpart. Although the game is set in the same universe as its counterpart, it features a different storyline.

== Gameplay ==
Turok 3: Shadow of Oblivion is an action game that is presented from a top-down perspective. To progress through the game, the player must control Turok through a series of levels while wiping out a large number of enemies using different types of weaponry. Some levels have keys that the player need to find to access locked areas and progress further through that level, while others require the player to control a vehicle and destroy structures. The game employs a password system to prevent the loss of progress. Although the game is set in the same universe as its Nintendo 64 counterpart, it features a different storyline. The story follows Turok as he aids peaceful Dinosoids to stop a rebel Dinosoid sect from reawakening an ages-old war.

== Development ==
Turok 3: Shadow of Oblivion was developed by the Spanish video game company Bit Managers and published by Acclaim Entertainment. The game uses the same engine as Bit Manager's previous Turok game, Turok: Rage Wars, which allows for multidirectional scrolling. The music of the game was composed by Alberto Jose González, who also produced the music of the previous Game Boy Color Turok games.

== Reception ==
Reception

Aggregate score
Aggregator	Score
GameRankings	62%

Review scores
Publication	Score
AllGame	3.5/5
GameSpot	7/10
IGN	8/10
Nintendo Power	6.7/10
Planet Game Boy	68%
Nintendo Acción	93/100

Turok 3: Shadow of Oblivion received generally favorable reviews from critics. Craig Harris of IGN considered it to be the best Turok game on the Game Boy Color system due to its smooth animations, responsive controls and old-school design, while the Spanish official Nintendo magazine, Nintendo Acción, highlighted its variety of environments and non-stop action. In a mixed review, Planet Game Boy magazine praised the vehicular sections, but criticized the unexciting on-foot action.

Writing for GameSpot, Frank Provo praised its balanced gameplay, concluding that "the vehicular and top-down levels give the game an activity-oriented feel, while the side-scrolling missions deliver the tried and true formula of bloodshed and mayhem the series' fans crave". Nintendo Power criticized its lack of challenge and short length, saying that it is possible to complete the game in just one hour.
