= Turok 2: Seeds of Evil (GBC video game) =

1998 video game

- European box art
- Developer: Bit Managers
- Publisher: Acclaim Entertainment
- Designer: Rubén Angel Gómez
- Programmers: Daniel Lopez; Isidro Gilabert
- Artists: Ruben Angel Gomez; Sergio Palacios; Julio Moruno
- Composer: Alberto Jose González
- Series: Turok
- Platform: Game Boy Color
- Release: NA: December 4, 1998; EU: December 11, 1998
- Genres: Action, platform
- Mode: Single-player

Turok 2: Seeds of Evil is an action-platform video game developed by Bit Managers and published by Acclaim Entertainment. It was released for the Game Boy Color handheld game console in 1998 alongside its Nintendo 64 counterpart. The game is backward compatible with the original Game Boy in monochrome mode. Although the game is set in the same world as its counterpart, it features a different storyline.

== Gameplay ==
In this level, the player rides a Pterodactylus while avoiding opponents. The player's health is displayed at the bottom of the screen.

Turok 2: Seeds of Evil is an action-platform video game that features eight side-scrolling levels and four boss encounters. The player can use multiple weapons to defeat enemies, ranging from a pistol to a shotgun, a grenade launcher, and a bow and arrow. In some levels, the player must ride a Pterodactylus or a canoe while avoiding opponents. The game employs a password system to prevent the loss of progress. Although the game is set in the same world as its Nintendo 64 counterpart, it features a different storyline. The story follows protagonist Joshua Fireseed and his attempts to stop the Amaranthine Accordance villains from bringing a massive Dinosoid army from the Lost World to Earth.

== Development ==
Turok 2: Seeds of Evil was developed by Bit Managers, a Spanish video game company based in Barcelona. The standard platform levels of the game were first created on graph paper and then replicated on a level editor, before becoming a playable level on the Game Boy hardware. The music of the game was composed by Alberto Jose González, who also produced the music of the previous handheld Turok game, Turok: Battle of the Bionosaurs. The game is backward compatible with the original Game Boy in monochrome mode.

== Reception ==
Reception

Aggregate score
| Aggregator | Score |
|---|---|
| GameRankings | 60% |

Review scores
| Publication | Score |
|---|---|
| IGN | 5/10 |
| Nintendo Power | 6.4/10 |
| Total Game Boy | 40% |
| Nintendo Acción | 92/100 |
| Nintendo, le Magazine Officiel | 80% |
| Planet Game Boy | 3/5 |

Turok 2: Seeds of Evil received generally mixed reviews from critics. IGN reviewer Peer Schneider described the game as "an E-rated cookie-cutter sidescroller with decent controls and unimpressive visuals". Nintendo Power highlighted the player's wide range of moves and side-scrolling action, but criticized the graphics for their limited color. The British video game magazine Total Game Boy criticized its level design and unrelated gameplay to the Nintendo 64 game, while Planet Game Boy noted that the game's emphasis on precise jumps may frustrate players. In more positive reviews, the Spanish official Nintendo magazine, Nintendo Acción, praised the game's length, animations, tight controls, and dynamic gameplay, while the French official Nintendo magazine remarked that the game's colorful graphics improve the game's atmosphere.
