= Darren Mitchell (composer) =

- Born: November 14, 1964 (age 61); Dallas, Texas, United States
- Genre: Video game music
- Occupations: Composer, musician, sound designer
- Years active: 1995-present

Darren Mitchell (born November 14, 1964) is an American composer, musician and sound designer, known for his work on video games such as Turok: Dinosaur Hunter, Turok 2: Seeds of Evil and South Park among others.

== Early life ==
Mitchell was born in Dallas, Texas, and attended the University of North Texas where he received a bachelor's degree.

== Career ==
Mitchell began his career as a composer of video game music in 1995, composing the music of titles like Frank Thomas Big Hurt Baseball, Turok: Dinosaur Hunter or South Park. Mitchell became the main composer of Iguana Entertainment in 1996, steadily working as an audio director since 1999. Mitchell left the company after it was bought out by Acclaim in 2000, and subsequently he worked as a freelance composer and sound designer.

Apart from his work on video games, Mitchell has also composed music for live ensembles, with his music being performed by different types of orchestras.
