= Disney Interactive Studios =

Defunct American video game developer and publisher

Disney Interactive Studios, Inc.
- Final logo, used from 2007 to 2016
- Formerly: Walt Disney Computer Software (1988–1994); Buena Vista Software (1988–1994); Disney Interactive (1994–2003); Buena Vista Games (2003–2007)
- Type: Subsidiary
- Industry: Video games
- Founded: September 15, 1988; 38 years ago
- Defunct: May 10, 2016; 10 years ago
- Fate: Closed
- Successor: Disney Games Group
- Headquarters: 500 Paula Ave, Glendale, California, US
- Brands: Touchstone Interactive
- Parent: Walt Disney Television (1988–1995); Disney Interactive (1995–2016)
- Subsidiaries: See § Studios
- Website: disneyinteractive.com

Disney Interactive Studios, Inc. was an American video game developer and publisher owned by the Walt Disney Company through Disney Interactive. Prior to its closure in 2016, it developed and distributed multi-platform video games and interactive entertainment worldwide.

Most of the games released by Disney Interactive Studios were typically tie-in products to existing character franchises. On May 10, 2016, as a result of the discontinuation of its Disney Infinity series, Disney shut down Disney Interactive Studios, and exited the first-party home console game development business in order to focus on third-party development of home console video games through other developers. However, it continued to release games for iOS and Android mobile devices under its own label, Disney Mobile, and later revived the Marvel Games and Lucasfilm Games labels for licensing of third-party developed games based on Marvel and Lucasfilm properties respectively until Epic Games received a $1.5 billion investment from the Walt Disney Company on February 7, 2024.

== History ==
=== 1988–1994: Walt Disney Computer Software ===
Disney established its own in house gaming unit, Walt Disney Computer Software, Inc. (WDCS), and it was incorporated on September 15, 1988. WDCS generally used third-party development studios to design spin-off games using its existing portfolio of characters. WDCS failed to meet the high expectations that came with the Disney name, although three of its self-published computer titles – Mickey's Runaway Zoo, Donald's Alphabet Chase and Who Framed Roger Rabbit – sold more than 100,000 copies, the industry equivalent of earning a Gold Record. The underlying issues were later attributed by senior Disney executives as being due to low product quality and lack of understanding of the differences between film and games.

WDCS also published a series of Nintendo (NES) and Gameboy platform game titles with Japanese video game company Capcom. Of these titles, 1989's DuckTales received the most commercial and critical success, selling approximately 1.67 million and 1.43 million copies worldwide respectively, each becoming Capcom's highest-selling titles for their respective platforms. Produced by founding WDCS producer Darlene Waddington, DuckTales' Gameboy version was named "Gameboy Game of the Year" by PC Player Magazine. DuckTales continues to be considered a game with high nostalgic interest and was remade in 2013 as DuckTales: Remastered. WDCS also published an animation program in 1991.

Following DuckTales, WDCS developed and published another NES platform game with Capcom, Chip 'n Dale Rescue Rangers. Rescue Rangers proved to be a commercial success, selling approximately 1.2 million copies worldwide, becoming Capcom's fourth highest-selling game for the Nintendo Entertainment System. Continuing with the success of these titles, Disney continued to find success with another Capcom developed title, Aladdin and The Lion King (developed by Westwood Studios) in 1993 and 1994 respectively. This led to a move from self-developed and self-published to funding and development management of games with third parties published the game.

=== 1994–2002: Disney Interactive ===
The logo of Disney Interactive from 1995 to 2007

Using the film studio style formula, WDCS was reorganized into Disney Interactive, Inc. (DI) on December 5, 1994, with the merging of WDCS and Walt Disney Television and Telecommunications.

On April 15, 1997, Disney Interactive announced it would exit the in-house video game market and reduce its staff by 20%. The company would instead license out Disney properties to third-party developers and publishers, of which the development and production cost risks were transferred to the game companies but reduced the per-unit revenue generated to Disney and effectively yielded a near 100% margin of licensed game sales.

In 1998, Disney Interactive signed a deal with Sony Computer Entertainment America to publish titles based on the films A Bug's Life and Tarzan exclusively on the PlayStation console.

On February 27, 1999, Disney Interactive signed a six-game publishing contract with Activision to release titles for the Nintendo 64, starting with A Bug's Life. In May, Disney signed a worldwide publishing agreement with Nintendo which would mainly focus on video games featuring Mickey Mouse on the Nintendo 64 and Game Boy Color, which would be developed by then-Nintendo partner Rare. The Game Boy Color would also see titles based on Alice in Wonderland and Beauty and the Beast. Another worldwide publishing deal was made with Ubi Soft in the same month for games based on Donald Duck and other Disney animated films which later included Dinosaur. In November, the company published a CD-ROM title based on the game show Who Wants to Be a Millionaire which went on to sell one million copies in four weeks.

In 2000, Disney Interactive reestablished Buena Vista Interactive as a secondary publishing label, initially being used to publish CD-ROM titles based on Who Wants to Be a Millionaire.

In May 2001, the company signed a deal with Sony Computer Entertainment to allow the latter to publish titles based on Atlantis: The Lost Empire, Monsters, Inc., Treasure Planet, Lilo & Stitch, and Peter Pan: Return to Never Land on the PlayStation and PlayStation 2. In European territories, Infogrames formerly distributed several of Disney Interactive's PC titles; however, this agreement was later replaced with several separate distribution deals, including JoWooD Productions in Germany.

In February 2002, Disney Interactive announced that they would return to the self-publishing console/handheld market by releasing titles for the Game Boy Advance, beginning with Return to Never Land, Lilo & Stitch, and Treasure Planet. They later signed a deal with Ubi Soft to publish and distribute the titles in Europe. In May 2002, the company formed a third publishing label named Plaid Banana Entertainment which would publish games developed by Hulabee Entertainment, a studio formed by Humongous Entertainment founders Shelley Day and Ron Gilbert.

=== 2003–2007: Buena Vista Games ===
In 2003, The Walt Disney Company announced that it would fully re-enter the self-publishing and core gaming markets, rebranding Disney Interactive, Inc. as Buena Vista Games, Inc. (BVG) The Disney Interactive and Buena Vista Interactive brands were retained as publishing labels for children's and core titles, respectively.

On April 19, 2005, Buena Vista Games announced that they had entered the game development market. The company formed Propaganda Games, based in Vancouver, British Columbia; which was made up of former employees at EA Canada, and purchased Avalanche Software in Salt Lake City, Utah for an undisclosed amount. On May 13, 2005, the company announced they had acquired the video game rights to the Turok franchise from owners Classic Media; which had been previously held by Acclaim Entertainment.

On April 27, 2006, Buena Vista Games entered into a publishing agreement with Japanese developer Q Entertainment where the company would publish four of the developer's titles globally except in Asia; including a Disney-themed version of Meteos. In September, Buena Vista expanded their developer cycle by purchasing Climax Racing from the Climax Group and formed Fall Line Studios in November to create casual titles for the Nintendo DS and the Wii consoles.

=== 2007–2014: Disney Interactive Studios ===
On February 8, 2007, The Walt Disney Company renamed Buena Vista Games to Disney Interactive Studios as part of a larger company initiative to phase out the Buena Vista brand that year. The studio publishes both Disney and non-Disney branded video games for all platforms worldwide, with titles that feature its consumer brands including Disney, ABC, ESPN, and Touchstone (which is used as a label for Disney). In July 2007, the studio acquired Junction Point Studios.

On June 5, 2008, Disney Interactive Studios and the Walt Disney Internet Group, merged into a single business unit now known as the Disney Interactive Media Group, and it merged its subsidiary Fall Line Studios with its sister studio, Avalanche Software, in January 2009. In February 2009, Disney Interactive acquired Gamestar, a Chinese game development company. On September 8, 2009, Disney Interactive announced that it had acquired Wideload Games.

In November 2010, the executive Graham Hopper left the company. He announced his departure via an internal e-mail saying "the time has come for me to move on from the company and set my sights on new horizons."

DIS in October 2012 announced "Toy Box", a cross platform gaming initiative where Pixar and Disney characters will interact from a console game to multiple mobile and online applications. The first Toy Box cross platform game is Disney Infinity based on the Toy Story 3 game's Toy Box mode crossed with a toy line.

After the purchase of Lucasfilm by The Walt Disney Company in 2012, Disney Interactive assumed the role of developing Star Wars games for the casual gaming market, while Electronic Arts would develop Star Wars games for the core gaming market through an exclusive license (although LucasArts did retain the ability to license Star Wars games to other developers for the casual gaming market).

At E3 2013, Disney and Square Enix released a teaser trailer for Kingdom Hearts III, after going seven years of not declaring any console Kingdom Hearts game since Kingdom Hearts II. The game would release nearly six years later in January 2019.

Disney Interactive Studios has lost more than $200 million per year from 2008 to 2012 during a period in which it shut down Canadian game development studio Propaganda Games, British developer Black Rock Studio and Austin-based game developing unit Junction Point Studios and its co-president John Pleasants stepped down in November 2013 after the launch of Disney Infinity.

=== 2014–2016: Decline and dissolution ===
On March 6, 2014, 700 employees were laid off. After the cancellation of Disney Infinity, Disney Interactive Studios closed in 2016.

== List of games ==
The company also publishes games from Q Entertainment worldwide except Asia: Lumines II, the sequel to the puzzle game for the PSP system; Lumines Plus, a new version of Lumines for the PlayStation 2; Every Extend Extra, a puzzle shooter; and a Disney Interactive Studios's Meteos: Disney Edition, the popular Meteos game for the Nintendo DS with Disney characters.

The company revealed a lineup of games at E3 2006, which include DIE's Turok, a re-imagining of the video game series of the same name and Desperate Housewives: The Game, based on the hit television show.

Disney Interactive Studios is credited in all entries to the Kingdom Hearts franchise, with the original release box art of each entry to the series having different logos and name of the company seeing as coincidentally, the company is re-branded in between the releases. Notably however, the company is not credited to actually developing the game.

== Studios ==
=== Moved to Disney Interactive ===
- Disney Mobile
- Disney Online

=== Former/defunct ===
Name	Headquarters	Founded	Acquired	Closed	Notes
Avalanche Software	Salt Lake City, Utah, United States	1995	2005	2016	Closed following Disney's exit from in-house publishing and the ending of the Disney Infinity series. Reopened in January 2017 as a subsidiary of Warner Bros. Interactive Entertainment.
Black Rock Studio	Brighton, England, United Kingdom	1998	2006	2011	Acquired from the Climax Group. Closed following cost-cutting measures and Disney's refocus on Freemium mobile titles
Creature Feep	—	2009	—	2015	Division of Disney Mobile, Closed
Fall Line Studios	Salt Lake City, Utah, United States	2006	—	2009	Folded into Avalanche Software as part of a cost-cutting restructuring
Gamestar	China	—	2009	—	Division of Disney Mobile
Junction Point Studios	Austin, Texas, United States	2004	2007	2013	Closed by Disney after the commercial failure of Epic Mickey 2: The Power of Two
Propaganda Games	Vancouver, British Columbia, Canada	2005	—	2011	Closed
Playdom	Palo Alto, California, United States	2008	2010	2016	Closed by Disney following the closure of its last active titles, Marvel: Avengers Alliance and its sequel
Rocket Pack	Helsinki, Finland	2010	2011	2015	Division of Disney Online. Closed
Wideload Games	Chicago, Illinois, United States	2003	2009	2014	Closed by Disney. Had been restructured as a mobile game developer before closure
