= Turok: Evolution (GBA video game) =

- Developer: RFX Interactive
- Publisher: Acclaim Entertainment
- Series: Turok
- Platform: Game Boy Advance
- Release: NA: September 1, 2002
- Genre: Shooter
- Modes: Single-player, multiplayer

Turok: Evolution is a side-scrolling shooter game in the Turok series. It was developed by RFX Interactive and published by Acclaim Entertainment for the handheld Game Boy Advance. It was released in 2002, alongside a home console counterpart. Turok: Evolution received mixed reviews according to Metacritic.

== Plot ==
In 1886, Tobias Bruckner and his cavalry kill off much of the Saquin Indian nation. The sole survivor, a man named Tal'Set, confronts Bruckner as a door appears, transporting both to the Lost Lands. There, Tal'Set meets the River People and Djunn, the tribe's greatest warrior. The player then chooses who to play as: Tal'Set or Djunn.

The player proceeds to rescue the Wise Father, leader of the River People, after he is kidnapped by Bruckner. The Wise Father says that Lord Tyrannus, an extraterrestrial being, has recruited Bruckner to help destroy the tribe with an army of experimental creatures. The player seeks out Lord Tyrannus, who flees onboard his spaceship. Following a battle, the player is given the choice of whether or not to kill Lord Tyrannus, with both endings congratulating the player on becoming a Turok fighter. If Lord Tyrannus is spared, then Bruckner becomes enraged at the player's mercy, before being killed in a grenade explosion.

== Gameplay ==
Turok: Evolution is a side-scrolling shooter game played across various locations, such as jungles and a moving train. Enemies throughout the game include soldiers and dinosaurs. Tal'Set and Djunn each have their own default weapon, and others can be picked up, including pistols, shotguns, flamethrowers, and rocket launchers. Armor upgrades are available in each level, and a guardian angel can be summoned in emergencies to kill off excess enemy forces. Like the rest of the game, boss battles take place from a third-person perspective but involve the player aiming weapons with a reticle to attack opponents in the background.

If the player dies, they must restart the level from the beginning. Each time a level is cleared, the player receives a password which can be used later to resume the game from that level. A second password is used to restore weapon and health status. Alternate paths and ladders are present throughout the game, providing shortcuts in some instances.

Turok: Evolution includes a cooperative multiplayer option via the Game Boy Advance Game Link Cable.

== Development and release ==
David Dienstbier, the creative head for the Turok games, said in 1999 that an installment for the then-upcoming Game Boy Advance (GBA) had been discussed several times. The handheld games in the series had previously been released for the Game Boy and Game Boy Color. In 2000, Dienstbier said that in the event of any future Turok game being developed, the GBA would be a likely console to receive it.

By early 2002, Acclaim Studios Austin was developing a home console installment known as Turok: Evolution. RFX Interactive was chosen to develop an eponymous GBA version, using artwork and audio from the home console game for reference. Among the Game Boy installments in the Turok series, it was the first not to be developed by Bit Managers. In the U.S., Turok: Evolution was published by Acclaim Entertainment on September 1, 2002, for home consoles and the GBA.

== Reception ==
Reception

Aggregate score
Aggregator	Score
Metacritic	72/100

Review scores
Publication	Score
AllGame	4/5
Consoles +	90%
Gamekult	6/10
GameSpot	7.3/10
IGN	8/10
Jeuxvideo.com	14/20
NGC Magazine	66/100
Nintendo Power	4/5 (Note: Four critics for Nintendo Power awarded the game a four-star rating out of five; a fifth critic gave it five stars.)
Retro Gamer	43%
Gaming Age	C−
MAN!AC	61/100
Nintendo Acción	87/100
Nintendo, le Magazine Officiel	7/10

Turok: Evolution received mixed reviews according to Metacritic. The gameplay received comparisons to the Contra and Metal Slug series.

The game was praised for its graphics, with Consoles + applauding the bright colors. Craig Harris of IGN wrote, "The pixel art is outstanding, with well-drawn backgrounds and extremely fluid animation; characters even have little blasts of light drawn on their fronts when they fire their weapons." Frank Provo, writing for GameSpot, found the graphics impressive considering the amount of onscreen action: "Characters animate fluidly and the screen never stalls, regardless of the number of bullets or explosions." Nintendo Acción opined that the graphics and sound could have been better, while other reviews believed the latter to be above average.

Turok: Evolution was criticized for its high level of difficulty, although Frédéric Luu of Gamekult found it adequately balanced by the presence of unlimited continues. Nintendo Acción considered the gameplay both repetitive and difficult, a viewpoint shared by Kevin M. Jones of Gaming Age. Jones wrote that the "tedious hit detection scheme is frustrating and at most times it feels like the game is cheating you." He concluded that Turok: Evolution "fails to recapture that lost and elusive magic of the side scrolling 2-D shooter genre."

Provo stated that players "generally have to be flawless in order to clear most levels," complaining of "many traps and other cheap shots" that are unavoidable on a first play. Nevertheless, Provo concluded that Turok: Evolution "is actually quite a good side-scroller" for those who can "withstand the surprisingly hard difficulty level". Harris wrote, "This game isn't a mindless shooter; the way the levels are designed, players will definitely have to play it conservatively in many instances". NGC Magazine called the action "pacey and well balanced" but otherwise thought that the game was lacking innovation.

Criticism was directed at the persistent respawning of enemies, particularly when they materialize on top of the player's character. Michael L. House of AllGame considered Turok: Evolution difficult enough as-is and opined that it is nearly perfect except for the respawning. Some reviews criticized the game for using a password system rather than a save feature.

A few critics found the game superior to its home console counterpart, with Harris writing, "As unimaginative and average as the console versions of Turok Evolution are, it's great to see how well the Game Boy Advance title turned out."

Chris Shive of Hardcore Gamer reviewed the game in 2022, writing that it "shines in embracing what it is, an over-the-top run-and-gun adventure". He went on to call it "one of the must-play gems" of the GBA game library.
