= Turok: Dinosaur Hunter =

1997 video game

- North American Nintendo 64 box art
- Developer: Iguana Entertainment (Note: The Windows port was ported by Sculptured Software.) (Note: The 2015 remaster was developed and published by Night Dive Studios.)
- Publisher: Acclaim Entertainment
- Producer: David Dienstbier
- Designer: David Dienstbier
- Programmer: Robert Cohen
- Artist: Alan D. Johnson
- Composer: Darren Mitchell
- Series: Turok
- Platforms: Nintendo 64; Windows; OS X; Xbox One; Linux; Nintendo Switch; PlayStation 4; PlayStation 5; Xbox Series X/S
- Release: March 4, 1997: Nintendo 64; NA/EU: March 4, 1997; AU: March 17, 1997 Windows; NA: November 26, 1997; EU: 1997; WW: December 17, 2015 OS X; WW: February 23, 2016 Xbox One; WW: March 2, 2018 Linux; WW: June 21, 2018 Switch; WW: March 18, 2019 PlayStation 4; WW: February 25, 2021 PS5, Xbox Series X/S; WW: February 28, 2025
- Genre: First-person shooter
- Mode: Single-player

Turok: Dinosaur Hunter is a first-person shooter video game developed by Iguana Entertainment and published by Acclaim Entertainment. Released in 1997 for the Nintendo 64 and Microsoft Windows in North America and Europe, the game is based on the comic book series of the same name by Valiant Comics. The player assumes the role of Tal'Set (Turok), a Native American warrior who must prevent the evil Campaigner from conquering the universe with an ancient and powerful weapon.

As Acclaim's first game for the Nintendo 64, Turok formed part of the company's strategy to develop games in-house and expand its licensed merchandise. Acclaim had acquired the rights to the Turok IP in 1994 through its purchase of Valiant Comics, which it subsequently renamed Acclaim Comics. Amid declining sales and cash-flow problems, the company came to regard Turok as its best prospect for a financial recovery. Iguana pushed the Nintendo 64's graphical capabilities to its limits, but technical constraints required the developers to compress or remove content to fit the game onto an 8-megabyte cartridge. Software bugs delayed its release from September 1996 to January 1997.

Critical reception of Turok was highly positive. Becoming one of the most popular games for the console on release, Turok won praise for its graphics and evolution of the genre. Complaints centered on graphical slowdowns caused by multiple enemies appearing onscreen and occasionally awkward controls. The game sold 1.5 million copies and boosted sales of the Nintendo 64. Turok spawned a video game franchise that includes a direct sequel, titled Turok 2: Seeds of Evil, in 1998, and a prequel, Turok: Evolution, in 2002. A remastered version of the game by Nightdive Studios was released through digital distribution for Microsoft Windows in 2015, followed by an OS X release in 2016, Xbox One and Linux releases in 2018, a Nintendo Switch release in 2019, a PlayStation 4 release in 2021, and PlayStation 5 and Xbox Series X/S releases in 2025. The original game was also re-released on the Nintendo Classics service via the Mature 17+ app in June 2024.

== Gameplay ==
A dinosaur attacks the player character, who wields a shotgun. Distance fog limits visibility to a small radius around the player.

Played from a first-person perspective, the 3D graphics and style of play combine elements of the run-and-gun video game Doom with exploration mechanics of Tomb Raider. Players begin the game in a central hub level, which contains portals to seven other stages. The player must find keys scattered across the stages. When enough keys have been inserted into the lock mechanisms of a hub portal, that level is unlocked. Players explore the large, typically jungle-based levels by jumping, swimming, climbing, crawling, and running.

One of the player's main objectives is to find pieces of a relic known as the Chronoscepter; there is one piece on each level. In exploring the levels the player fights various enemies such as poachers, gunmen, indigenous warriors, dinosaurs, demons, and insects. Turok features 13 weapons plus the Chronoscepter, ranging from a knife and bow to high tech weaponry. All weapons except the knife require ammunition, which is dropped by dead enemies or picked up in the levels. Enemies and boss characters have multiple death animations depending on what body region the player shot. Because items dropped by fallen enemies rapidly disappear, players must engage foes from close range.

The player character's health is shown as a number at the bottom of the screen. When the player is at full health, the meter reads 100, while dropping to 0 subtracts one life, and losing the last life ends the game. Gathering "life force" points scattered across the levels increases the player's life count by one for every 100 points accumulated. Players restore health by picking up powerups, which can increase health above full. Players may also gain health points by shooting deer or non-threatening wildlife.

== Plot ==
The player assumes control of Tal'Set (Turok), a Native American time-traveling warrior. The mantle of Turok is passed down every generation to the eldest male. Each Turok is charged with protecting the barrier between Earth and the Lost Land, a primitive world where time has no meaning. The Lost Land is inhabited by a variety of creatures, from dinosaurs to aliens. An evil overlord known as the Campaigner seeks an ancient artifact known as the Chronoscepter, a weapon so powerful that it was broken into pieces to prevent it from falling into the wrong hands. The Campaigner plans on using a focusing array to magnify the Chronoscepter's power, destroying the barriers that separate the ages of time and rule the universe. Turok vows to find the Chronoscepter's eight pieces and prevent the Campaigner's schemes.

== Development ==
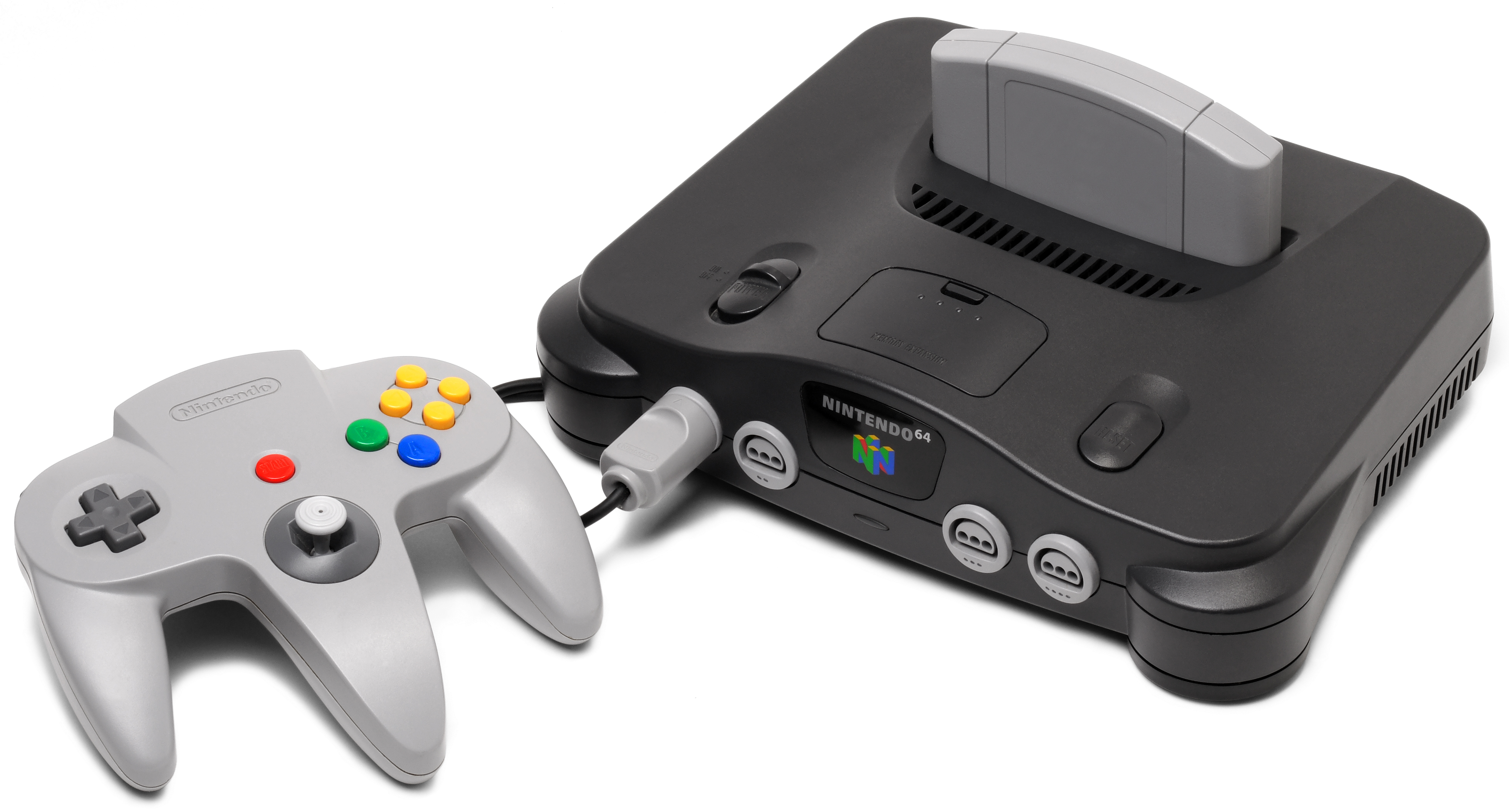
Turok was the first video game for Nintendo's Nintendo 64 to be developed by a third party. Critics found that the controller's analog stick took time to get used to but functioned well.

Turok originally appeared in comics from Western Publishing and Dell Comics in December 1954. Valiant Comics revived the series and published the first issue of their Turok series in 1993. Video game publisher Acclaim Entertainment bought Valiant for $65 million in 1994 and acquired developer Iguana Entertainment for $5 million plus stock a year later, part of a strategy to develop games in-house and make money licensing characters in different entertainment media. Turok was announced in August 1994 as an exclusive title for Nintendo's planned "Ultra 64" console, eventually called the Nintendo 64.

Development of Turok commenced in 1996. The game was developed by a 15-person team. While loosely based on the comic book, Iguana made the game more action-oriented. In early discussions about the project the developers decided that the typical side-scrolling game presentation had become tired. Iguana considered a third-person perspective similar to Super Mario 64 and Tomb Raider, but decided to make the game a first-person shooter instead. According to project manager David Dienstbier, the first-person perspective was a natural way to showcase the 3D power of the Nintendo 64. Creative director Nigel Cook explained that "first-person would be ideal to engage the player in the experience of hunting prey or being hunted." While the development team benefited from Acclaim's clout as a longtime Nintendo supporter, getting earlier feedback from the publisher and more face-to-face time during production, most of the developers at Iguana were new and inexperienced; Turok was Dienstbier's first title. Due to the game's action and violent content, Dienstbier believed they were pushing the limits of what Nintendo would allow on their console, but Nintendo never asked to see or approve anything in the game.

The Nintendo 64 platform had superior processing capabilities compared to most personal computers available at the time, but also came with challenges. "The [Nintendo 64] is capable of doing a lot of stuff," Dienstbier said. "If you want to handle fancy particle lighting, and transparency effects, and you want to throw around huge amounts of math ... or geometry onscreen, it's got the processing power to do that, and yes it's a fantastic machine. However, calling it a developer's dream kinda gives you the impression that it's easy to crank out a game like Turok, and it's definitely not." While Nintendo was supportive, Iguana had to produce all its game development tools internally. Fitting the game on its 8 MB cartridge was difficult; ultimately, Iguana had to compress everything and reduce the quality of the music to meet size requirements. Despite system constraints the developers were interested in producing the best-looking video game for the system: the game used real-time lighting effects and particle systems for added realism. Iguana was able to use Acclaim's state-of-the-art motion capture studio, allowing humanoid characters to move smoothly and in a convincing manner; motion capture helped alleviate the problems of Iguana's limited resources and tight schedule. A stuntman recorded movements for the human characters; while the developers tried to use emus and ostriches for the dinosaurs, the results were only used as reference material. The team wanted to make the game feel larger than it is by incorporating an "organic gameplay path" with levels featuring multiple routes to explore and collectible keys to unlock more levels. The inclusion of platforming sections was inspired by Super Mario 64.

At the time, Acclaim Entertainment was in financial jeopardy. The company was a major publisher in the 16 bit era of games, but the company's sales suffered as it was slow to migrate from older game systems like the Sega Genesis and Super Nintendo Entertainment System to next-generation platforms. The company lost $222 million in the 1996 fiscal year due to sales falling to $162 million compared to $567 million the previous year; in the first quarter of fiscal 1997, the company lost a further $19 million. The company laid off 100 of its 950 workers since March 1996 and its stock had dropped from a high of $13.875 a share to as low as $3. Turok, Acclaim's first Nintendo 64 title, became the company's best hope of a turnaround, as there were only ten Nintendo 64 games on the market, and Turok was the only shooter. Turok was the only major Nintendo 64 software demonstrated at the September 1996 European Computer Trade Show, with Nintendo themselves absent from the show. Alex. Brown Inc analysts figured that selling one million copies of Turok could bring Acclaim as much as $45 million. Due to cash flow issues, much of the money planned for marketing Turok was contingent on strong sales of Magic: The Gathering: BattleMage. Endangering Turok's sales was its high price—$79.99 in the US, £70 in the UK, and $129.95 in Australia—and Entertainment Software Rating Board's "mature" rating, which suggested lower sales as parents would not buy the game for their children.

== Delay and release ==
Originally slated for a September 30, 1996, release in North America, the game was initially delayed to January 1997. Acclaim explained that the game had not reached the desired quality level; Nintendo maintained that the delay was to "add more depth to the gameplay". According to The New York Times, the delay stemmed from computer bugs in the program. Acclaim heavily marketed Turok on the covers of video-gaming magazines and in television commercials for the Nintendo 64. Acclaim gave media outlets such as The Mirror customized Turok-branded game consoles to give away in sweepstakes. Responding to positive pre-orders and advance sales of Turok, Acclaim announced on January 2, 1997, that a sequel, tentatively titled Turok: Dinosaur Hunter 2, would be released in late 1997. Acclaim dubbed the March 4 release date of the game "Turok Tuesday", reporting that pre-sales at Toys "R" Us had exceeded expectations. Acclaim stock increased in anticipation before the game's release, up $0.62 to $5.94.

In 1998 Turok was added to the Nintendo 64's $39.99 line. Acclaim chairman and CEO Greg Fischbach said that while selling Nintendo 64 cartridges at this price is not very profitable of itself, it allowed Acclaim to completely sell out their Turok inventory, and the accompanying $4 million advertising campaign by Nintendo was helpful in maintaining awareness of the Acclaim and Turok brands.

== Reception ==
Reception

Aggregate score
| Aggregator | Score | |
| Aggregator | N64 | PC |
|---|---|---|
| Metacritic | 85/100 | N/A |

Review scores
| Publication | Score | |
| Publication | N64 | PC |
|---|---|---|
| Computer Games Magazine | N/A | 3/5 |
| Computer and Video Games | 5/5 | N/A |
| Edge | 9/10 | N/A |
| Electronic Gaming Monthly | 8/10, 5.5/10, 7/10, 7/10 | N/A |
| Game Players | 8.3/10 | N/A |
| GameFan | 99/100 & 97/100 (Note: In GameFan's review, two critics scored the Nintendo 64 version 99/100, another 97/100.) | N/A |
| GameRevolution | A− | N/A |
| GameSpot | 8.1/10 | 7/10 |
| Hyper | 90% | N/A |
| IGN | 8.6/10 | N/A |
| N64 Magazine | 91% | N/A |
| Next Generation | 3/5 | N/A |
| Nintendo Life | 5/10 | N/A |
| PC Gamer (UK) | N/A | 68% |
| PC Zone | N/A | 9/10 |
| Video Games (DE) | 90% | N/A |

Turok was a critical and commercial success, earning rave reviews from video game magazines and becoming the most popular title for the Nintendo 64 in the months following its release. On the aggregate review web site Metacritic, the console version of Turok has an 85% rating, based on scores from thirteen reviews.

Douglass Perry of the multimedia website IGN compared Turok favorably to other first person shooters, saying that the title distinguished itself by allowing a level of 3D movement not possible in other members of the genre. GamePro, which gave Turok a perfect score in all four categories (control, funfactor, graphics, and sound), similarly said "Turok has more firepower, more control over its environment, and more gruesome graphics than other corridor shooters." While agreeing that the game offers greater freedom of movement, a Next Generation reviewer opined that first-person platforming does not work since the player cannot see their character. He found this strongly contrasted with the game's "top notch" shooting elements. The Australian's Steve Polak wrote that while Turok was highly derivative, the game was evidence of the evolution of the genre, offering more graphics and gameplay options. Video game magazine Edge said that Turok contradicted the prevailing notion at the time that only Nintendo could create superior games for the console. In contrast, William Burrill of The Toronto Star wrote that Turok offered nothing new if players had tried a first-person shooter before, and Next Generation Online said that its similar gameplay essentially made the game "a very pretty Duke Nukem". The four reviewers of Electronic Gaming Monthly remarked that while the graphics and animation are stunning, the controls and level design are lacking. Speaking to Shacknews in 2007, Propaganda Games's Josh Holmes said that while GoldenEye 007 is commonly considered the standard-setting console shooter, Turok pioneered the console shooter first by offering open environments and deviating from the corridor-based shooters that were the standard until then.

Reviewers found that Turok's controls generally worked well. Perry, GamePro, and Next Generation all noted that while many players would not initially like using the Nintendo 64's analog stick for weapon movement, they would become adept at the control scheme. The Electronic Gaming Monthly review team, however, said they wished the controls could be reconfigured to a scheme that was easier to master. Polak wrote that the joystick let players aim with a remarkable amount of precision. George Mannes of The Daily News found the controls to be easy to learn and simple to keep track of in comparison to PC shooters, but said the joystick control could be disorienting: "the only problem is when you look up in the air and make the slightest twitch to the left or the right, you can end up like a tourist staring up at the Empire State Building and whirling like a dervish," he wrote. Reviewers found that the game's included tutorial helped players adapt to the controls.

Critics lauded Turok's graphics; while giving the rest of the game a tepid response, Burrill and the EGM team both rated the visuals highly. Polak said that the game proved the supremacy of the Nintendo 64's graphics in the console market. Translucent water, destructible trees and lens flares were among the graphical details praised by reviewers. The Washington Post's Tom Ham said that "equally impressive" as the environmental detail were the "true-to-life" animations. "Blow away a baddie and he'll grab his throat, blood splatting, and then fall to the ground, still convulsing," Ham wrote. "How can you put a price on that?" GamePro agreed that the gruesome death animations are a highlight of the all-around impressive graphics. The level of gore and blood in the game lead reviewers such as GamePro, The Times's Tim Wapshott, and The Washington Times's Joseph Szadkowski to caution against letting children play the game. GameSpot's Jeff Gerstmann noted that the graphics came at a price; if more than a few enemies appeared on screen at the same time, the game's frame rate would slow down. Gerstmann wrote that the distance fog used to reduce the slowdown was a "neat effect" as enemies would appear out of the mist "fangs first", although it masked the console's limitations. Perry commented that the inability to look into the distance forced players to rely on the game map. Next Generation said that while Turok was overall probably the best-looking Nintendo 64 game to date, the limited texture palette causes all the environments to appear similar, making the game disorienting despite the map.

The PC port was not as well received. Colin Williamson commented in PC Gamer that the game's popularity on the Nintendo 64 could in part be attributed to the shortage of games for the system at the time. Like Next Generation, he said that while the graphics are impressive, the limited textures and constant fog make the game disorienting, and first-person platform jumping does not work. He added that the game's problems are compounded on PC because the conversion failed to add on features that PC gamers take for granted, such as a multiplayer mode and ability to save at any point. GameSpot's Tim Soete likewise criticized the PC version's retention of the problems and checkpoint-based save system of the Nintendo 64 version, though he had an overall positive reaction to the game, calling it "a technically arresting adventure." Steve Bauman of Computer Games Magazine reviewed the PC version and said that while it was an excellent port, the game itself was inferior to other shooters such as Quake.

Worldwide sales of Turok: Dinosaur Hunter surpassed $60 million in late June 1997, and accounted for 45% of Acclaim's revenues in the fiscal quarter in which the game was released. The game also held the top spot for video game rentals for seven weeks consecutively. Acclaim re-issued the game for the 1997 holiday season due to its sales potential for the increased console player base. Turok was later named a Nintendo "Player's Choice" title in 1998—the only third-party Nintendo 64 game to be featured at the time—and ultimately sold about 1.5 million units. The game generated $200 million in revenue worldwide by 1998. At the Academy of Interactive Arts & Sciences' inaugural Interactive Achievement Awards (now known as the D.I.C.E. Awards), Turok was nominated for "Interactive Title of the Year", "Console Game of the Year", and "Console Action Game of the Year".

NGC Magazine wrote that Turok changed perceptions of a Nintendo console: "On a machine from a company that had long specialised in primary colours and family fun, the last thing anyone anticipated was the kind of cutting-edge first-person shooter that was previously the sole preserve of expensive gaming PCs." Not only did Turok change this, but it established a "system-selling franchise" that persisted even after the N64 was replaced. In a retrospective, John Linneman of Digital Foundry considered Turok ahead of its time for its seamless world and graphical innovations. Justin Joy of ComicBook.com credited Turok with being "the shooter that proved consoles could compete with PC", with its "open levels, verticality, platforming, and fluid controls that made the game feel faster than anything on home consoles, even 007: Goldeneye."

== Legacy ==
Following the game's success, Sculptured Software (another of Acclaim's internal studios) conducted tests to see if Turok: Dinosaur Hunter could be faithfully converted to the PlayStation. A Game.com version was announced, and early screenshots of it circulated in the press, but it was never released. In February 2017, the source code of the N64 version was sold on eBay for $2551.99 which was found on a Silicon Graphics (SGI) Indy development machine which originated from the Acclaim Entertainment liquidation.

Nightdive Studios produced a remastered version of the game, along with Turok 2, for the PC. The game includes improved graphics as well as "other improvements" based on the original PC ports of the titles. The remaster was released in digital stores on December 17, 2015. The remaster was later released for the Xbox One, Nintendo Switch, PlayStation 4, PlayStation 5 and Xbox Series X/S consoles. Nightdive also released the original game on the Nintendo Classics service via the Mature 17+ app in June 2024 due to their license of the original game.

The game would spawn a franchise of Turok video games, with Iguana developing four more titles in the series: Turok 2: Seeds of Evil (1998), Turok: Rage Wars (1999), Turok 3: Shadow of Oblivion (2000), and Turok: Evolution (2002). Iguana would also use the Turok 2 game engine in South Park (1998). Former Iguana employees who worked on Turok joined Retro Studios upon its founding in 1998, eventually releasing Metroid Prime (2002), expanding on Turok's focus on movement and exploration, and spawning its own series. Rare saw Turok as a benchmark when they were developing GoldenEye 007, noting its "very nice looking art" and smooth framerate.
