= Turok: Evolution =

2002 video game

- Developer: Acclaim Studios Austin (Note: Ported to Windows by Super Happy Fun Fun.)
- Publisher: Acclaim Entertainment
- Director: David Dienstbier
- Producer: Jeff Everett
- Designers: Neill Glancy; Rex Dickson
- Programmer: Dave Smith
- Artist: Peyton Duncan
- Composer: Nelson Everhart
- Series: Turok
- Platforms: PlayStation 2, Xbox, GameCube, Windows
- Release: September 1, 2002: PlayStation 2, Xbox; NA: September 1, 2002; AU: September 5, 2002 (PS2); PAL: September 6, 2002 GameCube; NA: September 1, 2002; EU: September 27, 2002 Windows; EU: October 24, 2003
- Genre: First-person shooter
- Modes: Single-player, multiplayer

Turok: Evolution is a first-person shooter game in the Turok series. A prequel to Turok: Dinosaur Hunter (1997), it was developed by Acclaim Studios Austin and published by Acclaim Entertainment. It was released for the PlayStation 2, Xbox and GameCube in 2002, alongside a handheld version for the Game Boy Advance. A port of the home console game was released for Windows in 2003, for the European market.

While previous home console games in the series were exclusive to the Nintendo 64, Turok: Evolution marked the series' debut on next-generation platforms. Development was underway in 2001, after a year of creating the game development tools and engine. Turok: Evolution received mixed reviews according to Metacritic. The series was rebooted with a 2008 entry titled Turok.

== Plot ==
The game begins with the seer, Tarkeen, explaining the history of the Lost Lands which had, for years, been fought over by tyrannic warlords.

On Earth during the old west, Tal'Set faces off with his enemy, Captain Bruckner, and succeeds in knocking the gun out of his hand, but both of them are suddenly and inexplicably sucked into a wormhole. The wormhole opens in the jungle canopy of the Lost Land, and Tal'Set is nearly killed from the fall. He is found unconscious by the people of the River Village who call upon Tarkeen to heal him. Once healed, Tal'Set enters the jungle to fight reptilian humanoids known as the Sleg, aiming to keep them away from the Village. Tal'Set and River Village pilot Genn fly upon pterosaur-back to evict the Sleg from the jungle and destroy their airship.

Tal'Set reaches Tarkeen's sanctum and is told he must accept the mantle of Turok and release Tarkeen from a curse. When Tal'Set refuses, Tarkeen tells him that the Sleg had managed to reach the Village. This enrages Tal'Set which prompts him to cut through the mountains to reach the Sleg base to free the villagers and Wise Father from captivity.

Tal'Set proceeds to liberate the prisoners and destroy the base. Here, he learns of the existence of a human general, none other than Bruckner himself, who had ordered the attack on the village. It is also learned that the Sleg are planning to assault the human capitol, Galyana, but for their army to reach it, they must cross a giant chasm with only two known crossings. Tal'Set is sent through the thickly forested Shadowed Lands to destroy one of these crossings, an ancient bridge. The bridge is destroyed with Tal'Set upon it, but he is saved from falling by his pterosaur.

Tal'Set flies to the second crossing, the Suspended City, where his pterosaur is shot down. Tal'Set breaches the city and cleanses the street with his comrades, surviving the first wave of Sleg paratroopers entering the city. He breaches the Senate and saves the Senators, who tell him that the only way to stop the Slegs from cutting through the city is to destroy it. Tal'Set subsequently releases the tethers connecting the city to the Chasm walls. Tal'Set is given another pterosaur steed by the senators and escapes the falling city by flight.

The city is successfully destroyed, but the Sleg leader, Lord Tyrannus, has one more tactic to try. He unleashes the Juggernaut, an immense pair of cannons mounted upon a massive sauropod, with the aim to level Galyana. Tal'Set infiltrates and destroys the Juggernaut but before escaping is confronted by Tyrannus. The Sleg leader threatens to kill Tal'Set but is held off by Tarkeen. Tal'Set escapes again on his pterosaur and destroys one last wave of Sleg troops.

With the Sleg defeated, Tal'Set continues his hunt for Bruckner, quickly finding him aboard a Tyrannosaurus rex equipped with various weapons. Tal'Set kills the animal, which traps Bruckner beneath it as it falls. Tal'Set leaves the villain alive, stating "he does not deserve a warrior's death". As Tal'Set leaves, Bruckner is eaten alive by a pack of Compsognathus. In the aftermath, Lord Tyrannus furiously screams at his defeat and was not mentioned or seen again. Tal'Set tells Tarkeen that he accepts the mantle of Turok.

== Gameplay ==
Turok: Evolution is primarily a first-person shooter. The player, taking on the role of Tal'Set, can run, jump, crouch, swim, and climb ladders and vines. In addition to Sleg troops, other enemies include wild animals such as dinosaurs. A tomahawk is available for combat against enemies, and numerous other weapons can be found throughout the game, including grenades, pistols, shotguns, flamethrowers, and rocket launchers.

The game is played across 15 levels; several are played from a third-person perspective, with the player controlling a pterosaur through the sky while fighting land- and air-based enemy forces. Portions of the flying levels are played as a rail shooter while other areas provide freedom of movement. Health replenishments are present in both the first-person and flying levels.

Turok: Evolution features four player split screen multiplayer for GameCube and Xbox, and two player for PS2. The game features at least 13 multiplayer maps, several of which contain dinosaur AI bots.

== Development ==
Turok: Evolution was developed by Acclaim Studios Austin (previously Iguana Entertainment), which also handled the previous Turok games. David Dienstbier, who was creatively involved with the earlier installments, served as the game's director. A year before the release of Turok 3: Shadow of Oblivion (2000), it was decided that the following installment would return the series to its roots with a substantial jungle setting. This new game, which ultimately became Turok: Evolution, would serve as a prequel to the original installment, Turok: Dinosaur Hunter (1997). Another early decision was to develop it for multiple game platforms; among home consoles, the Turok series was exclusive to the Nintendo 64 up to that point.

Turok: Evolution had a development team of more than 35 people. A year was spent creating the game development tools and engine, with actual development of game content beginning in 2001. Turok: Evolution marked the series' debut on next-generation consoles: GameCube, PlayStation 2 (PS2), and Xbox. The three versions share the same storyline and gameplay, with only minor graphical differences. Dienstbier was pleased working with the GameCube and Xbox hardware, and although his team found the PS2 challenging by comparison, they were impressed with its graphical capability: "We were kinda expecting the results not to be as high as they were, just knowing the differences that we had to work with. But when we got the levels up and running on the PlayStation 2 we were literally just thrilled."

The development team wanted to include flying levels in the series ever since the first installment. However, the Nintendo 64 hardware made this difficult, forcing the team to scrap the idea before reviving it in Turok: Evolution with the next-generation technology. During development, Dienstbier described the game as "the most pure and fully realized" Turok installment to date: "It's the entire dream that we originally had for the franchise."

The game makes use of motion capture, for instance in its enemy death animations. Aside from the game's solo campaign, Acclaim dedicated an entire separate team of artists, designers, and programmers to work on the multiplayer mode. To keep the game on budget and schedule, Acclaim chose not to include online options for the multiplayer mode. Andrew Brock, the lead sound designer, spent two years recording a library of sound effects for the game.

Turok: Evolution was announced at the E3 expo in May 2001, and was completed in August 2002.

== Release ==
Turok: Evolution was published by Acclaim Entertainment. It was first released in the United States on September 1, 2002, launching simultaneously with an eponymous handheld version which features different gameplay. A port of the home console version was released for Windows in 2003, for the European market.

=== Marketing ===
Turok: Evolution had an $8 million marketing budget, which included print and television ads.

Acclaim Entertainment, known for unusual marketing of its games, launched a promotional campaign in August 2002, asking U.K. residents to change their names to "Turok". Five winners would be selected, each receiving £500, and a free Xbox console and copy of the game. The winners would have the option to change their name back after one year. Acclaim's UK communications manager Shaun White said: "The five Turoks will no doubt speak to and meet tens of thousands of people between them over the next year and will be walking talking adverts for the Turok video game. We think this type of advertising is sure to take off and will prove to be a big hit". More than 10,000 people applied for the campaign through its website, and the winners were announced in September 2002, a few days before the game's U.K. release. However, a 2020 investigation by VG247 found that the winners were actually paid actors who never went through with the name change.

Acclaim ran a similar campaign in the U.S., where it offered $10,000 in savings bonds to the first baby named "Turok" to be born on the day of the game's release. Like the U.K. campaign, parents could undo the name change after one year. Acclaim spokesman Alan Lewis said, "We're giving birth to our biggest game, so it's a natural tie-in. People have been naming their kids after movie and sports celebrities for years--why not games?"

== Reception ==
Reception

Aggregate score
Aggregator	Score
Metacritic	(GC) 70/100 (PS2) 61/100 (Xbox) 68/100

Review scores
Publication	Score
AllGame	2/5 (GameCube)
PC Zone	2.8/10 (Windows)
Extended Play	3/5 (Xbox)

Turok: Evolution received "mixed or average" reviews, according to review aggregator Metacritic. Among the home console versions, an analysis by IGN found the Xbox game best on account of its graphics and sound, while noting the PS2 version had the worst graphics and load times. PC Zone criticized the Windows version as a bad port with poor graphics.

Scott Alan Marriott, reviewing the GameCube version for AllGame, noted that the game addressed numerous complaints regarding the earlier Turok installments. However, he found that some of the changes made for a worse game experience: "The level design is less interesting [...], with linear stages taking minutes to complete. Also gone are the cinematic cut-scenes to help tie the story together and create a sense of purpose." Marriott was also frustrated by the controls in the flying levels and considered the game's overall graphical quality "wildly inconsistent", although he praised the sound effects and music.

Jason D'Aprile reviewed the Xbox version for Extended Play and called it "entertaining enough but not particularly memorable". He too found the graphics inconsistent, praising the character models while criticizing the "drab" and outdated landscapes. He also stated that the sound and music do not sync well with gameplay, although he did enjoy the addition of flying levels.

The game's villain, Tobias Bruckner, lived on through Electronic Gaming Monthly's annual Tobias Bruckner Memorial Awards, which "honored" what they perceived to be the worst in video games, with categories specific to the games released in that year.

== Cancelled sequel ==
After the release of Turok: Evolution, Acclaim Studios Austin placed a small team in charge of creating a sequel. The project was not picked up, and the team moved on to other projects.

In June 2004, Classic Media announced that they had revoked Acclaim's video game rights for the franchise due to a lack of royalty payment, preventing a sequel from being made regardless of the circumstance.
