= The Animation Studio =

Animation software

The Animation Studio is a 1991 software published by Walt Disney Software.

== Gameplay ==
The Animation Studio is a computer animation software package, featuring a drawing program.

== Reception ==
Roy Wagner reviewed the program for Computer Gaming World, and stated that "For serious cel animation, requiring lots of work and time, (and most likely worth all the effort put into it), The Animation Studio is recommended. It gives its users much greater control over all the details necessary to create original animations."
