= Turok: Origins =

- Developer: Saber Interactive
- Publisher: Saber Interactive
- Director: Jesús Iglesias
- Producer: Alberto San Josè Tabares
- Designer: Carlos de Maria Castillo
- Series: Turok
- Engine: Unreal Engine 5
- Platforms: Windows; Nintendo Switch 2; PlayStation 5; Xbox Series X/S
- Release: 2027
- Genre: Action-adventure
- Modes: Single-player, multiplayer

Turok: Origins is an upcoming action-adventure video game developed and published by Saber Interactive. A reboot of the Turok franchise, it will be released for Windows, Nintendo Switch 2, PlayStation 5 and Xbox Series X and Series S in 2027.

== Gameplay ==
Turok: Origins is an action-adventure video game that is playable in both first-person and third-person. The player controls a futuristic warrior who must fight against hostile wildlife and Xenia, a race of reptilian aliens, across multiple planets. The player can choose from one of three character classes (Cougar, Bison and Raven), with each having its own weapons and abilities. For instance, the Bison can create a protective barrier, while the Raven can launch fireballs at enemies. Each class is also equipped with a scanner that allows players to identify enemies' weak points. By defeating boss characters, players can extract their DNA and gain EchoSyncs, which unlock more ability upgrades. While the game is largely linear, players can explore each planet to find hidden areas, collectibles, optional combat encounters, and side objectives. The game supports a three-player cooperative multiplayer mode.

== Development ==
Turok: Origins' development was led by the Madrid studio of Saber Interactive, which previously worked on Evil Dead: The Game. More than 250 people had worked on Turok: Origins. The studio compared the scale and the quality to Warhammer 40,000: Space Marine 2 (2024), which was also developed by Saber Interactive. The team chose to make a Turok game due to their desire to create one featuring dinosaurs. The team added a third-person mode to better visualize the player's outfits, weapons, and EchoSync powers to players. However, they retained a first-person mode after listening to players' feedback. As with the first two games in the series, Origins was heavily inspired by Native American culture and mythology, and cultural experts were consulted during the game's development.

The game was announced at The Game Awards in December 2024. It will be released for Windows, Nintendo Switch 2, PlayStation 5 and Xbox Series X and Series S in 2027.
