= Turok (surname) =

Turok is a surname. Notable people with the surname include:

- Ben Turok (1927–2019), South African anti-apartheid activist
- Marta Turok (born 1952), Mexican anthropologist
- Mary Turok, South African politician
- Neil Turok (born 1958), South African physicist
