= Turiec (disambiguation) =

Turiec is a region in central Slovakia.

Turiec may also refer to:

- Turóc County, a former county of the Kingdom of Hungary
- Turiec (Sajó), a river in southern Slovakia
- Turiec (Váh), a river in northwestern Slovakia
- Turiec Basin, the basin of the Turiec in northwestern Slovakia
