= Dinosaur Hunter =

1996 video game

- Developer: DK Interactive Learning
- Publisher: Global Publishing Software
- Series: Eyewitness Virtual Reality
- Platforms: Windows, MacOS
- Release: 1996
- Genre: Education
- Mode: Single player

Eyewitness Dinosaur Hunter is an educational video game in the Eyewitness Virtual Reality series, developed by DK Multimedia and released for Windows and MacOS in 1996.

== Gameplay ==
The player explores the museum, using a point-and-click method. The museum is in the shape of the Eyewitness logo. The outer corridor contains a timeline showing the evolutionary branches of certain dinosaurs, the east room contains maps and images of what the world looked like during the period in which dinosaurs existed, and the west room is a multi-level excavation site where the player can dig for fossils. Upon completion of a skeleton, the dinosaur will "come to life" and roam the museum. The rest of the museum contains various exhibits, which players can either explore themself or experience through four virtual tours: Introduction, how dinosaurs lived, how dinosaurs evolved, and extraordinary dinosaurs.

== Reception ==
The game was considered advanced for its time, described as virtual reality, although today the term is restricted to much more advanced programs. Childhood Education journal described it as having a "feeling of walking through an actual museum" despite the simple point-and-click system used. The Culture of Design said the game's developers went to "extraordinary lengths" to make the museum believable.

The New York Times described the game as having a "clear, clean interface and design". Edmonton Journal praised how it combined "old-fashioned reading and model building".

== Other Eyewitness Virtual Reality titles ==
- Eyewitness Virtual Reality Earth Quest
- Eyewitness Virtual Reality: Cats
- Eyewitness Virtual Reality Bird
