= Propaganda Games =

Canadian video game developer

- Formerly: Revolution Interactive (2005)
- Type: Subsidiary
- Industry: Video games
- Founded: April 2005; 21 years ago
- Founder: Josh Holmes; Howard Donaldson; Daryl Anselmo; Jorge Freitas
- Defunct: January 2011; 15 years ago
- Fate: Closed
- Headquarters: Vancouver, British Columbia, Canada
- Key people: Gary McKay (studio general manager); Howard Donaldson (vice-president, studio operations)
- Number of employees: ~100 (2010)
- Parent: Disney Interactive Studios

Propaganda Games was a Canadian video game development studio based in Vancouver. Founded by Josh Holmes in April 2005, it was bought by Disney Interactive Studios, the interactive subsidiary of the Walt Disney Company, the same year. In January 2011, Propaganda Games was closed.

== History ==
Buena Vista Games formed the new studio with former employees of EA Canada in April 2005. They acquired the Turok license in May 2005, which was released in 2008 for the current generation consoles at the time. A sequel, Turok 2, was in development soon after but was canceled due to layoffs.

Once work was completed on Tron: Evolution and the proposed Pirates of the Caribbean title was cancelled, Disney closed the studio in January 2011.

== Games ==
Release date	Title(s)	Genre(s)	Platform(s)
2008	Turok	First-person shooter	Microsoft Windows, PlayStation 3, Xbox 360
2010	Tron: Evolution	Action-adventure	Microsoft Windows, PlayStation 3, Xbox 360
Canceled	Pirates of the Caribbean: Armada of the Damned	Action; Role-playing game Adventure	Microsoft Windows, PlayStation 3, Xbox 360
Canceled	Turok 2	First-person shooter	Xbox 360
