= Distance fog =

In 3D graphics, obscuring distant objects with fog

Distance fog is a technique used in 3D computer graphics to enhance the perception of distance by shading distant objects differently.

Because many of the shapes in graphical environments are relatively simple, and complex shadows are difficult to render, many graphics engines employ a "fog" gradient so objects further from the camera are progressively more obscured by haze and by aerial perspective. This technique simulates the effect of light scattering, which causes more distant objects to appear lower in contrast, especially in outdoor environments.

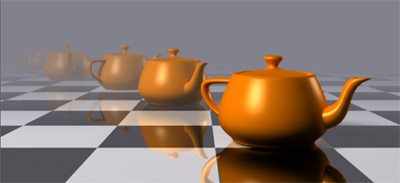
Example of distance fog on the Utah teapot

Visibility in a natural haze declines exponentially, not linearly, with distance due to scattering. The colour of the light being scattered into the viewing path affects the colour of the haze; blue under blue skies, reddish near sunset, as with alpenglow. These more subtle details are represented in some graphics.

"Fogging" is another use of distance fog in mid-to-late 1990s games, when processing power was not enough to render far viewing distances, and clipping was employed. Clipping could be very distracting since bits and pieces of polygons would flicker in and out of view instantly, and by applying a medium-ranged distance fog, the clipped polygons would appear at a sufficiently far distance that they were obscured by the fog, fading in as the player approached.

== See also ==
- Aerial perspective
- Anisotropic filtering
- Computer graphics
- Draw distance
- Level of detail (LOD)
- Scale space
