= Turok 2: Seeds of Evil =

1998 video game

- North American Nintendo 64 box art
- Developers: Iguana Entertainment; Nightdive Studios (remaster)
- Publishers: Acclaim Entertainment; Nightdive Studios (remaster)
- Designer: David Dienstbier
- Programmer: Stephen Broumley
- Artist: Alan D. Johnson
- Composer: Darren Mitchell
- Series: Turok
- Platforms: Nintendo 64; Windows; Xbox One; Linux; macOS; Nintendo Switch; PlayStation 4
- Release: December 10, 1998: Nintendo 64; NA: December 10, 1998; EU: December 18, 1998 Windows Original; NA: February 9, 1999; EU: March 5, 1999 Remaster; WW: March 16, 2017 Xbox One; WW: March 2, 2018 Linux, macOS; WW: September 12, 2018 Switch; WW: August 9, 2019 PlayStation 4; WW: February 25, 2021
- Genre: First-person shooter
- Modes: Single-player, multiplayer

Turok 2: Seeds of Evil is a first-person shooter video game developed by Iguana Entertainment and published by Acclaim Entertainment. It was released for the Nintendo 64 console in 1998 and ported to Microsoft Windows computers in 1999. Seeds of Evil is the second game in the Turok video game series and a sequel to Turok: Dinosaur Hunter. The game follows the story of a Turok and his efforts to stop a powerful alien entity from escaping the confines of his Lightship. A different game set in the same fictional universe, also titled Turok 2: Seeds of Evil, was released for the Game Boy Color alongside the Nintendo 64 game.

Seeds of Evil features a single-player campaign consisting of six levels and a multiplayer mode where various players can compete against each other in several game types. It supports the Nintendo 64 Expansion Pak, which enables an optional high-resolution graphics mode. The game was developed over a period of 21 months and was originally intended to be released on a 12MB cartridge without a multiplayer component, but was ultimately released on a 32MB cartridge.

Seeds of Evil was positively received by critics and sold 1.4 million copies by January 1999. Reviewers praised the game for its detailed graphics, deep levels, and advanced artificial intelligence of enemies. However, the game's inconsistent frame rate and notable distance fog were common subjects of criticism. A remaster developed by Nightdive Studios was released for Microsoft Windows in 2017, Xbox One in 2018, Nintendo Switch in 2019, and PlayStation 4 in 2021. A sequel, Turok 3: Shadow of Oblivion, was released in 2000. The original game was also re-released on the Nintendo Classics service via the Mature 17+ app on October 28, 2024.

== Gameplay ==
The player is shooting at an enemy with the shotgun. In the middle of the room there is a level key that can be collected. Turok's health and ammunition are shown at the bottom left corner of the screen.

Like its predecessor Turok: Dinosaur Hunter, Seeds of Evil is a first-person shooter where the player assumes the role of Turok from a first-person perspective. As Turok, the player can run, jump, climb ladders, swim and dive underwater for a limited period of time. The player can carry an unlimited number of weapons, ranging from bows and arrows to pistols, rifles, a shotgun, a grenade launcher, a flamethrower, a speargun, and more advanced weapons such as the Cerebral Bore, which fires a homing projectile capable of latching onto enemy's heads, killing them by drilling into their skulls and exploding. Turok has a certain amount of health which decreases when attacked by enemies. If Turok's health is fully depleted, the player loses one Life Force point and has to continue the game from a previous checkpoint. If the player loses all Life Force points, the game will be over. Ammunition, health, and Life Force suppliers can be collected throughout the game to increase the player's resources.

To progress through the game, the player must venture through six large levels interconnected by a hub area. In each level, the player must complete multiple objectives and then exit the level via a portal. Objectives range from destroying objects to rescuing hostages and defeating enemies, among others. Upon exiting a level, the player must either protect a totem from enemy forces or defeat a boss, or both, depending on which level the player was; the first three levels require the player to protect a totem, the fourth and fifth levels require the player to protect a totem and then defeat a boss, and the last level requires the player to defeat a boss. The game features an automap to help players navigate through the levels.

Once a particular level has been completed, the player is sent to the hub area, which features six portals to each of the individual levels and a gate that leads to the final boss. All the portals in the hub area, except for the first one, must be unlocked with keys that must be collected in the levels. The keys that unlock the portals to the second and third levels are found in the first level, the keys that unlock the portal to the fourth level are found in the second level, the keys that unlock the portal to the fifth level are found in the third level, and the keys that unlock the last level are found in the fourth and fifth levels. As a result, the game allows the player to complete certain levels in a nonlinear order. In the Nintendo 64 game, the player's progress can only be saved in special portals, while the Microsoft Windows version lets players save the game at any point. In these portals, the player may also fully restore Turok's health and ammunition once per level.

In addition to level keys, every level has one Primagen Key. The six Primagen Keys unlock the gate to the final boss in the hub area and require the player to use talismans to collect them. Talismans grant Turok special powers, such as allowing him to jump long distances or walk over lava. To use the power of a talisman, the player must collect a feather in a level and then take it to the talisman chamber from that level. There are five talismans in the game and every level, except for the first one, features a feather and a talisman chamber. The Primagen key from one particular level usually requires the player to use the talisman from the next level, except for the Primagen key from the last level, which requires the player to use four talismans. Therefore, the player needs to re-enter some levels more than once to collect all Primagen keys and complete the game.

=== Multiplayer ===
In addition to the single-player mode, Seeds of Evil features a multiplayer mode where various players can compete against each other in several game types. Options such as time limit, map to play on, and characters to play as can be changed to match player preference. Every character has their own strengths and weaknesses, with some being able to regenerate health. For example, the Raptor is limited to close-range attacks, but is also extremely fast and agile. Multiplayer games in the Nintendo 64 version of the game support up to four players via split screen. In contrast, multiplayer games in the Microsoft Windows version support up to 16 players via LAN or internet.

The Nintendo 64 version features two game types: Deathmatch or Team Deathmatch, where the objective is to kill as many opposing players as possible; and Frag Tag, in which one random player is transformed into a monkey with no attacks and very little health. The monkey's task is to go to a specific point to return to their normal form and transform another random player into the monkey. Players gain points by killing the monkey and lose points if they die as the monkey. The Microsoft Windows version features three game types: Rok Match, which is the same as Deathmatch; Arena, where two players or teams must battle against each other in an arena setting. The winning player or team will have to face a new opponent. If the player or team loses, they will have to get in line and wait for their next turn to fight again; and Capture the Flag, where the goal is to capture opposing flags and return it to a team's base.

== Plot ==
Seeds of Evil begins with the new Turok, Joshua Fireseed, appearing through a portal to face an alien named Adon (/ˈeɪdɒn/ AY-don). She explains he has been called by the Elders of the Lost Land, the Lazarus Concordance, to defeat the Primagen (/ˈpraɪmədʒɛn/ PRY-mə-jen), a powerful alien entity that was imprisoned in the wreckage of his own Lightship after attempting to witness the creation of the universe. This incident led to the creation of the Lost Land, a bizarre and barbarian world where time has no meaning. Awakened by the events of Dinosaur Hunter, the Primagen mobilizes several races of primitive creatures from the Lost Land to destroy five Energy Totems, powerful devices that bound the Primagen to his Lightship. The destruction of these Energy Totems would allow the Primagen to escape the confines of his Lightship, and the resulting shockwave would destroy the known universe.

As Joshua defeats the Primagen's armies through the Lost Land and acquires ancient magical powers from sacred talisman chambers, a mysterious entity calling itself Oblivion attempts to thwart his quest by creating false copies of the talisman chamber portals that lead to areas populated by its servants, the Flesh Eaters. Ultimately, Joshua manages to reach the Primagen's Lightship and defeat the Primagen himself. If the Energy Totems are not protected, traces of his telepathic powers will remain. At the end of the game, Adon states that the mysterious force which conspired against Joshua during his quest still exists, setting the stage for the sequel Turok 3: Shadow of Oblivion.

== Development and release ==
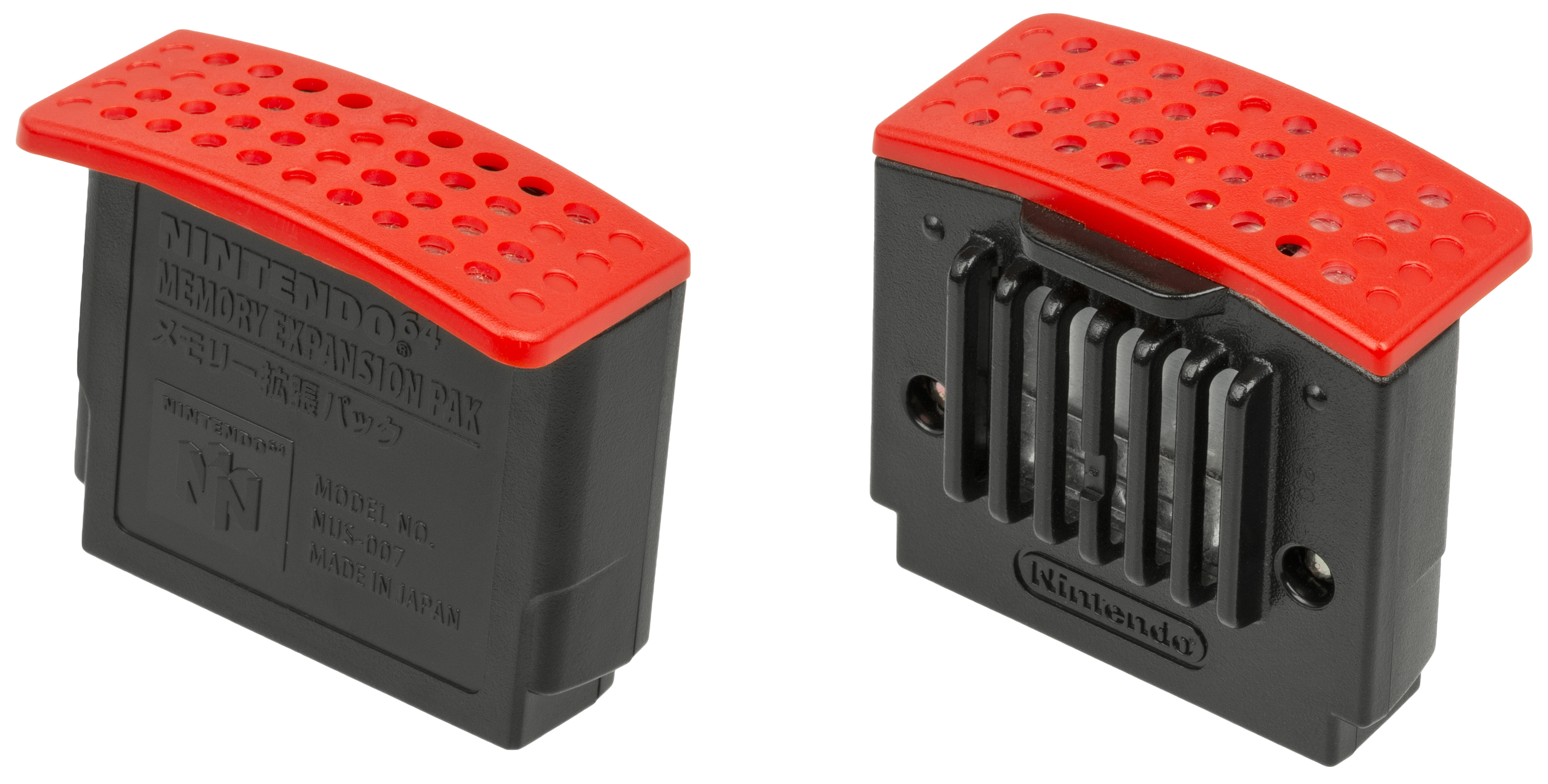
Seeds of Evil supports the Nintendo 64 Expansion Pak, which allows the game to be played at a resolution of 640x480 pixels.

Seeds of Evil was developed by Iguana Entertainment with a team roughly the same size as that of Dinosaur Hunter, which was composed of 18 people. As development progressed, more staff was brought on board to assist in completing the game. Development started before Dinosaur Hunter was released and preliminary work on level and enemy design finished by July 1997. The Cerebral Bore weapon was inspired by the Tall Man's weapons from the 1979 film Phantasm. The base idea for the weapon was conceived during a brainstorming session concerning weapon design. The original concept had the weapon "being slow and agonizing". An artist suggested a Leech gun, but it was ultimately rejected by project manager David Dienstbier.

The game uses an optimized version of the Dinosaur Hunter engine, which allowed developers to create environments with more complex geometry and incorporate a lighting system where light sources could cast shadows on objects in real-time. The game's distance fog was reduced and disguised as an atmospheric effect, resulting in players being able to see five times as far than they could in the original game. The game's progression, focus on exploration and mission objectives were inspired by the Mario and Zelda franchises. As Dienstbier explained: "That's something that we learned from Miyamoto: Start things off simple and gradually add to it as you progress. Later objectives will make far more use of the dynamic environments." Unlike the original game, where levels shared graphic assets, Seeds of Evil features unique levels with different geometry, textures and enemies.

Having received Nintendo 64DD development kits that included the Nintendo 64 Expansion Pak, Iguana Entertainment added an optional high-resolution mode to the game early on in the development cycle. In conjunction with the Expansion Pak, this mode allows the game to be played at a resolution of 640x480 pixels, a technical accomplishment for the Nintendo 64 at the time. An upgraded polygon modelling technique was used to give the game better-formed creatures. However, motion capture was avoided because none of game's enemies are human. Dienstbier felt that if their animations were motion captured, enemies would look like a person pretending to be a lizard in a costume. The game features different animations for different creatures. Unlike its predecessor, where enemies have two types of death animations, Seeds of Evil includes a third and gorier one.

Seeds of Evil was originally designed to fit in a 12MB Nintendo 64 cartridge. Nevertheless, when cartridges prices fell, the storage was increased to 16MB, allowing the development team to add a multiplayer mode, influenced by GoldenEye 007. The multiplayer levels were designed so that players could have all sort of mobility, including running, jumping, climbing and swimming. According to Dienstbier, this freedom of movement "means that [players] have a lot less predictable death match play because [they] have far more possible escape routes within each level". Compared to the single-player levels, the multiplayer maps feature more basic geometry. This choice was made to ensure there was little to no slowdown and a smooth frame rate. The cartridge size was ultimately increased to 32MB, which was the largest size for a Nintendo 64 game at the time. The actual development of the game took overall 21 months to complete and over 10,000 hours of game testing were reportedly conducted.

In May 1998, a demonstration of the game running in high-resolution mode was presented at the Electronic Entertainment Expo. With a marketing budget of $9 million, the game was fairly anticipated and worldwide retailers ordered 1.75 million copies of the game before launch. Seeds of Evil was originally planned to ship in October 1998 for Acclaim Entertainment's "TurOctober" event, but the release date was pushed back to November. It was pushed back again to December due to minor bugs preventing the game from receiving Nintendo's approval. The game was released in North America on December 10, 1998. The game was rescheduled for a European release on December 18. This delay was due to problems in fitting the game on the 32MB cartridge. In Japan, the game was released on June 18, 1999, as Violence Killer: Turok New Generation (バイオレンスキラー TUROK NEW GENERATION). A different game set in the same fictional universe, also titled Turok 2: Seeds of Evil, was released for the Game Boy Color alongside the Nintendo 64 game. A port of the game was released for Microsoft Windows on February 9, 1999. The port was developed from the ground up by a studio based in Salt Lake City and supports GameSpy for online multiplayer.

== Reception ==
Reception

Aggregate scores
Aggregator	Score
GameRankings	89% (N64); 73% (PC)
Metacritic	86/100

Review scores
Publication	Score
Edge	9/10
Electronic Gaming Monthly	8.5/10, 8.5/10, 8.5/10, 8/10
EP Daily	8.5/10
Famitsu	30/40
GamePro	4.5/5
GameRevolution	A−
GameSpot	9/10 (N64); 6.7/10 (PC)
IGN	9/10 (N64); 7/10 (PC)
N64 Magazine	95%
Next Generation	5/5
Nintendo Life	8/10
Nintendo Power	9.2/10

Seeds of Evil received "generally favorable" reviews according to Metacritic and sold 1.4 million copies by January 1999. Next Generation praised the game's technical aspects and improvements over its predecessor, while GameSpot described Seeds of Evil as "a landmark shooter and a must-buy", stating that the game "raised the bar for first-person shooters" like Rare's 1997 title GoldenEye 007. The graphics were seen as one of the strongest aspects of the game. Nintendo Power remarked that, in high-resolution mode, Seeds of Evil was "as stunning" as the most sophisticated computer games of the time, saying that "not even the crisp reality of GoldenEye 007 or the rich fantasy of Zelda looks this cool." Edge said that the game's artistic range is remarkable, especially for a Nintendo 64 game, and considered the flamethrower to have "easily the best graphic realisation of such equipment yet seen in a videogame".

Although the graphics were widely praised for their details, the game's inconsistent frame rate and intense distance fog were generally criticized. Peer Schneider of IGN said that, unlike its predecessor, Seeds of Evil "forgoes framerate for detail so often [that] some gamers will definitely be put off by the choppiness". The music and sound effects were highlighted positively. GameSpot said that the soundtrack is "well suited to the game and never intrusive", while Victor Lucas of The Electric Playground described it as "suspenseful, dynamic and always adrenaline charged". Similarly, Tim Weaver of N64 Magazine credited the music for being "dramatically scored, with strings, tom toms, bass lines and nerve-juddering screeches as enemies spring out at you from all angles". He also remarked that the soundtrack's loop was well disguised.

The gameplay was praised for its deep single-player missions and varied enemy types. Game Revolution highlighted the long and complex levels, but admitted that players may "[run] around in circles for hours trying to figure out where to go next. This may be enjoyable for people who like puzzles and long gameplay, but it is aggravating for more action-oriented players". N64 Magazine gave high marks to the game's level design and explained that the addition of mission objectives "gives the game more focus and betters its predecessor's pretty limited and fairly simple key-collection." The artificial intelligence of enemies was considered more advanced than GoldenEye 007's, as enemies can take refuge behind objects and pop up to throw explosives towards the player. GamePro also noted that they were more aggressive than Dinosaur Hunter's. The game's large arsenal of weapons was also praised, with GameSpot remarking that the Cerebral Bore is "possibly the grossest weapon ever conceived". The multiplayer mode was praised for its use of 3D space and innovative game types.

Critical reception for the Microsoft Windows port was mixed. Tal Blevins of IGN criticized the controls for its limited support of keyboard functions and the graphics for their distance fog, which was not common in computer games of the time. Nevertheless, he praised the save system for letting players save the game at any point. Writing for GameSpot, Elliott Chin criticized the game for its confusing level design and insistence on playing a level again if the player misses a key. At the 1998 GameSpot Game of the Year awards, the Nintendo 64 version was awarded Shooting Game of the Year. In a retrospective review, Martin Watts of Nintendo Life said that Seeds of Evil "is quite possibly the best third-party effort ever released for Nintendo 64".

In its first month of release, Turok 2: Seeds of Evil was the eighth best-selling home console video game in the United States.

== Remaster ==
Nightdive Studios developed a remastered version of both Seeds of Evil and its predecessor. The remaster was released for Microsoft Windows on March 16, 2017, for Xbox One on March 2, 2018, and for Linux and macOS on September 12, 2018. It features enhanced graphics, improved artificial intelligence of enemies, the option to quick-warp to previously visited portals, and a new multiplayer mode called Last Turok Standing. The remaster was released for the Nintendo Switch on August 9, 2019. Although the Nintendo Switch version was released without a multiplayer mode, it was ultimately added with the release of a patch on February 25, 2021. The remaster was released for PlayStation 4 on February 25, 2021, also playable on the PlayStation 5 via backward compatibility. PlayStation 5 and Xbox Series X/S versions of the remaster are scheduled, adding higher refresh‑rate support, additional quality‑of‑life improvements, and bug fixes.
