= Turok: Rage Wars =

1999 video game

- North American box art
- Developer: Acclaim Studios Austin
- Publisher: Acclaim Entertainment
- Director: Mark Pacini
- Designers: Jason Behr; Neill Glancy
- Artist: Michael Daubert
- Composer: Darren Mitchell
- Series: Turok
- Platform: Nintendo 64
- Release: NA: November 23, 1999; EU: December 26, 1999
- Genre: First-person shooter
- Modes: Single-player, multiplayer

Turok: Rage Wars is a first-person shooter video game developed by Acclaim Studios Austin and published by Acclaim Entertainment. It was released for the Nintendo 64 video game console in 1999 as part of the Turok series. It is one of the first modern arena shooters, with a heavy emphasis on multiplayer gameplay. It supports a maximum of four players simultaneously via split-screen. The game also supports the Nintendo 64 Expansion Pak for high-resolution graphics, but does not require it. A separate game, also titled Turok: Rage Wars, which is set in the same universe but features a different gameplay and storyline, was released for the Game Boy Color in 1999.

== Gameplay ==
Turok: Rage Wars is a first-person shooter with a heavy emphasis on multiplayer. It features three distinct modes of gameplay:

Single-Player Trials Mode - In the Single-Player Campaign, the player must go through a number of death matches through the various game mode types and must face all four game bosses as well. Each character in the game must be played to the end of their campaign at least once to unlock other characters and rewards, including Talismans and an increase in maximum health.

Two-Player Trials Mode - This mode is similar to the Single-Player Campaign with the addition of cooperative gameplay. Some rewards can only be gained in the Two-Player Campaign. In early copies of the game, the two-player trials mode was affected by a glitch which prevented progressing past a certain point.

Multiplayer - In this mode, the player selects a character and level to play. The player starts with Turok, Adon, Bio Bot Elite, and Mantid Drone as the first playable characters, with more characters unlockable through the Single-Player Trials Mode. Multiplayer has several game type options, including, Bloodlust and Team Bloodlust, which are deathmatch-style games, Capture the Flag, and Monkey Tag, in which a random player is transformed into a monkey that other players can frag to score points. In this mode, the player can configure the options for gameplay before each game.

The game features weapons divided into three ammunition types: bullet rounds, energy rounds, and explosive rounds. A player may only carry six pre-selected weapons at one time. However, when playing as Tal'Set, the player has access to every weapon in the game at once.

In addition to weapons that can be picked up in-game, most arena maps contain a Power Core, a glowing pink-and-blue crystalline item floating in a set location. They are similar to the "Power Ups" in Quake III Arena and grant the player a randomly selected power. Each Power Core lasts approximately 15 to 20 seconds.

There are 50 medals that can be earned in the game to unlock cheats and character skins. Medals are awarded for completing a range of actions, from defeating bosses to committing suicides. One of the medals is impossible to achieve in the United States version of early (black-cartridge) copies of the game due to a Two-Player Trials glitch in the "Creature Tag" levels. Acclaim recognized this glitch and exchanged any black cartridges with fixed grey cartridges. The recalled variants weren't widely known, however, and have led to the grey cartridge variant of the game being a rare collector's item.

== Development ==
Turok: Rage Wars was developed by Acclaim Studios Austin and conceived before Turok 2: Seeds of Evil was released. According to creative director Dave Dienstbier, the game "was born out of knowing that we couldn't flesh out all our multiplayer ideas in Turok 2 in time for the holiday season". The Turok 2 engine was used as a basis to build the game.

== Reception ==
Reception

Aggregate score
Aggregator	Score
GameRankings	72%

Review scores
Publication	Score
AllGame	3.5/5
CNET Gamecenter	7/10
Edge	7/10
Electronic Gaming Monthly	6.5/10 (Note: In Electronic Gaming Monthly's review of the game, one critic gave it 6/10, another gave it 7/10, and the rest gave it each a score of 6.5/10.)
Game Informer	8/10
GameFan	(T.R.) 91% 79% (Note: In GameFan's viewpoint of the game, three critics gave it each a score of 78, 68, and 91.)
GamePro	5/5 (Note: GamePro gave the game three 5/5 scores for graphics, sound, and overall fun factor, and 4/5 for control.)
GameSpot	5.8/10
Hyper	71%
IGN	8.9/10
N64 Magazine	87%
Next Generation	2/5
Nintendo Life	7/10
Nintendo Power	7/10

Turok: Rage Wars received above-average reviews according to the review aggregation website GameRankings. Game Industry News praised the game for its multiplayer, noting the extensive character selection and wide variety of battle grounds. GameCritics remarked that the "graphics and animation are more than competent" and the "controls are also responsive and handle with considerable ease". Nintendo Power also praised the responsive controls, especially when aiming or shooting, but criticized the jumping ability for being challenging. However, Chris Kramer of NextGen called the game "The very definition of a 'quickie,'" saying that "The guts of the previous Turok titles have been ripped free, leaving a bland multiplayer game with very little reason to play. There is a single-player game, but merely a ladder-like competition where you face off bots of dubious intelligence." He concluded, "If you want a good multiplayer N64 game, pick up Quake II or go back to GoldenEye."

The game has been criticized for multiple issues. Although Edge praised the game's speed of play, well-defined arenas and varied weapons, the magazine described the single-player aspect as "little more than a limited training ground for the multiplayer version", thus questioning whether its price was actually justified. GameSpot said similar cons and noted that the game's artificial intelligence "can't stand up to any steady-handed human player". While the game does not require the RAM Expansion Pack, the reviewer felt that playing without it resulted in the game having "mushy and quite ugly" graphics. Daily Radar noted that the "audio feedback is lacking" and "the weapons interface, as well as the lack of ammo, makes the game frustrating".
