= Turok (video game) =

2008 video game

- Developers: Propaganda Games; Aspyr (Windows)
- Publisher: Disney Interactive Studios (Note: Released under the Touchstone Interactive banner.)
- Director: Mike Jacob
- Producers: Craig Ostrander; Gene Ransom
- Programmer: Andrew Fisher
- Artist: Jay Riddle
- Writer: Doug Barber
- Composer: Paul Ruskay
- Series: Turok
- Engine: Unreal Engine 3
- Platforms: PlayStation 3 Xbox 360; Windows
- Release: PlayStation 3, Xbox 360: NA: February 5, 2008; AU: February 7, 2008; EU: February 8, 2008; Microsoft Windows: NA: April 22, 2008; EU: June 13, 2008; AU: June 19, 2008
- Genre: First-person shooter
- Modes: Single-player, multiplayer

Turok is a first-person shooter video game developed by Propaganda Games, and published by Disney Interactive Studios under Touchstone Interactive. It was released for the PlayStation 3 and Xbox 360 in February 2008, and later ported to Microsoft Windows in April.

Turok is loosely based on the comic book series of the same title and is a reboot of previous Turok video games. Players assume the role of Kiowa space marine Joseph Turok, who is part of a team sent to a remote planet to apprehend General Roland Kane, Turok's former commanding officer, who is a wanted war criminal. After crash landing, Turok discovers that the planet is home to dinosaurs, and must fight both the predatory creatures and Kane's private army on his mission to take down his former mentor.

The game received mixed reviews from critics and was a commercial success. A planned sequel was cancelled following the closure of Propaganda Games.

== Gameplay ==
The gameplay of Turok is similar to that of most first-person shooters, with a strong focus on survival in dangerous natural environments. The human enemies, under the leadership of Kane, are the main threat to the player, although dinosaurs may often be found wandering throughout. The dinosaurs act as a neutral force and, if the player chooses, can be used as a tool to attack enemy soldiers. This may be done by attracting roaming dinosaurs to a firefight (via: flares, gunshots, etc.) to aid the player and help dispatch the enemy, with possible other ways depending on the situation. Other dinosaurs and humans, including the player's allies and enemies, may be attacked.

The developer Propaganda Games has included an additional, stealth mechanic. Because Turok takes place mostly in jungle environments with a focus on ambiance, the player may kill enemies with a bow or knife without being heard or use dinosaurs to attract the attention of other enemies and slip by unnoticed. A feature is the Silent Kill, which is done by drawing the knife, then attacking a human or unaware dinosaur from behind. The kill can be utilized against dinosaurs and humans alike as a finishing blow, and can be executed from any side. The knife is utilized as a self-defense weapon during phases known as "mauls", where the player is attacked by a dinosaur or bug, and must hammer on the according buttons in order to counter-attack or fend off the attack.

=== Multiplayer ===
Online multiplayer support is also available. There is a (Team) Deathmatch, Capture the Flag, Wargames, and Assault Capture the Flag. Multiplayer supports up to 16 people, and 4 players for three co-op missions. A feature in the multiplayer—randomly spawning computer-controlled dinosaurs and insects that appear in various locations in levels—adds a new factor to the gameplay. While players must worry about the opposing enemies, they must now also worry about the hostile dinosaurs that will be attempting to kill them. There can be up to 4 A.I controlled dinosaurs or insects on any map at one time.

Originally, the Xbox 360 version of Turok was set to feature an achievement called "Grab Bag", which required players to kill at least one enemy, one dinosaur, one teammate, and themselves, all in the same match. This caused controversy on the Internet as the achievement essentially rewarded players for team killing. Josh Holmes, a representative of Propaganda Games, described the creation of the Achievement by saying: "What we found was that players playing their first match in Turok – almost every player – was (accidentally) killing himself, a team mate and an enemy with a grenade or a Stick [sic] Bomb gun and so we thought 'hey, we should give them an achievement for that', as kind of a joke". He went on to say that developers were planning to release a patch removing Grab Bag if excessive team killing became a problem after launch. In the launch version of the game, the achievement removed the requirement of killing a teammate, and is awarded after the player kills an enemy, a dinosaur, and themselves in the same match. A Map pack called the "Velociraptor Pack" was released, containing two multiplayer maps, one co-op map, and two refurbished maps, which take place at night.

The online multiplayer for the PlayStation 3 version has been shutdown since February 2011.

== Plot ==
Corporal Joseph Turok (Gregory Cruz), alongside fellow members of Whiskey Company, awaken from deep sleep after their vessel arrives outside orbit of an unknown planet. Once everyone is ready, Captain Cole debriefs the company on their task with apprehending war criminal General Roland Kane (Powers Boothe), who has resurfaced on a planet after disappearing for several years. Kane is the former leader of Wolf Pack, an elite black ops special forces detachment. Unbeknownst to Whiskey Company, the planet is controlled by the Mendel-Grumman (M-G) Corporation, with Kane commanding an army of M-G soldiers. During the debrief, Cole reveals that Turok was a member of this unit but left over its ideals during a mission. Whiskey Company member Slade (Ron Perlman) shows a disliking towards Turok and is distrustful of him.

On further approach to the planet, Whiskey Company's ship is shot down and crash lands, scattering the company. While unconscious from the crash, Turok dreams of his past when he was military prisoner before being recruited by Kane for his capable skills. Moments later, Turok is awoken by NCO Sergeant Henderson (Steve Van Wormer). The two men escape their portion of the crash site and decide to explore for others survivors. Coming upon a cliffside Turok and Henderson spot the other half of their crashed ship; furthermore, they find that the land is populated by genetically-engineered dinosaurs. When Henderson stops to try and radio any survivors, he is ambushed and killed by a Utahraptor, forcing Turok to travel alone. Eventually, Turok finds Slade who is under attack by a squad of M-G soldiers; Slade begrudgingly accepts Turok's assistance. During the brief moment of peace Slade reveals his dislike towards Turok is due to his brother, Robert, being killed during the Colombia mission and also because of Turok abandoning Wolf Pack shortly after. Turok appears reluctant to explain the reason behind leaving and shifts the blame to Kane but Slade remains skeptical. When the two continue further, they are surprised by a platoon of M-G soldiers and try their best to fight them off. The firefight ends when a Tyrannosaurus rex intervenes and wipes out the rest of the platoon, ignoring Turok and Slade.

In order to get to the other crash site, the duo are forced to cut through a massive M-G base followed by crossing a large valley. As Turok and Slade are arriving closer to the base's perimeter, Turok appears bewildered when he discovers a compound bow in some ship wreckage. It is revealed that the bow was his weapon of choice when he was in Wolf Pack. The two men infiltrate the base and Turok discovers that the planet is in the process of being terraformed. They manage to escape the facility and cross a desolate valley before once again trekking through the jungles. Along their journey the duo are reunited with the company's sniper, Reese (Gideon Emery).

After some time, the trio reach the crash site and locate more of Whiskey Company: leader Cole, second-in-command Gunnery Sergeant Lewis, Engineer Carter (Jason Harris), heavy weapons trooper Jericho (Christopher Judge), weapons specialist Corporal Logan (William Fichtner), medic Parker (Joshua Gomez), technician and pilot Shepard (Donnie Wahlberg), and Privates Foster (Jon Curry) and Gonzales (Lombardo Boyar). Cole tasks Turok with finding the ship's comm unit so they can call for back up and leave, Turok is reluctant to give up hunting for Kane but agrees to search. While alone Turok encounters John Grimes (Sean Donnellan), Kane's second-in-command, who tries to convince Turok to rejoin Wolf Pack, stating he will always be accepted back but leaves when Turok rebuffs his offer. Traveling further along, Turok encounters another survivor, Cowboy (Timothy Olyphant), who is shot and wounded by Grimes with an arrow. Whiskey Company comes to Cowboy's aid, when seeing the injury Slade accuses Turok of attacking Cowboy but before he can do anything the rest of the squad intervenes. Logan tasks Turok to resume his search for the unit, taking Foster and Gonzales with him. When coming upon a destroyed outpost Foster is killed by a M-G sniper, forcing Turok and Gonzales to fight some M-G soldiers. Gonzales finds and recovers the comm unit, but before he can reach Turok he is snatched by a large Tyrannosaurus rex. Turok chases after the Tyrannosaurus until he reaches its nest and is forced to fight its offspring. When it arrives back to the nest Turok injures the T-Rex, but is knocked unconscious and thrown out of the nest.

Turok wakes and makes his way back to camp with the comm unit, when the others see that he's alone, Slade accuses him of again betraying his comrades. Before Cole (Mark Rolston) has a chance to speak with Turok, he is killed in a surprise attack by Grimes, and M-G troops storm the area with assistance from a tank. Whiskey Company fends off the attack, but Parker and Lewis are killed and the comm unit is destroyed. With all surviving commanding officers killed in the attack and with Sergeant Henderson already dead, Logan assumes command; he orders Turok, Slade, and Carter to investigate some distant searchlights.

Reaching an abandoned outpost, the trio find that Kane has derived a potent neurotoxin taken from scorpion-like creatures, as well as the location of a ship in a substation near the M-G base. The same creatures attack them, killing Carter, while Turok and Slade fall into a cave system. Turok saves Slade from a large tentacled creature, earning Slade's respect. They escape the caves and link up with the remainder of Whiskey Company.

An approaching M-G patrol causes Logan (who is suffering from brain damage) to accuse Turok of betraying Whiskey Company, but Slade defends Turok. The patrol inadvertently discovers them and Logan is killed by an M-G helicopter which is taken down by Turok. The group fight their way to the substation and Jericho sacrifices himself to allow the others access. To their dismay they discover that the ship is derelict, and travel to the M-G base in search of another. At the base's perimeter, Reese spots Grimes from afar but is killed before he can react. The survivors manage to fight their way inside the base, after being indirectly helped by the scarred Tyrannosaurus that Turok had fought earlier. While exploring the base the group further learn that Kane has developed a lethal nerve gas from the scorpion creatures. To prevent the bio-weapon from leaving the planet, Turok sets explosive charges on the base's generators. When Turok returns to the group Kane captures them and kills Cowboy after the latter taunts him. While Kane is distracted Turok detonates the charges, causing a chain reaction and resulting in Grimes' death when he is crushed by falling debris.

Turok, Shepard, and Slade flee from the collapsing base. They reach another ship but Turok refuses to leave until Kane is dead. Turok shoots down Kane's personal ship, and they engage in a knife fight, ending in Turok killing Kane. The scarred Tyrannosaurus confronts Turok and during their fight, Turok is able to climb onto its face and push a live grenade into its eye, killing it. Turok is picked up by Shepard and Slade in their ship, and they set a course back to Earth.

== Development ==
The game was in development for three years with a team of 150 people. It is one of only two games produced under the Touchstone Games label, the other being the European release of Anno 1701: Dawn of Discovery.

== Reception ==
Reception

Aggregate score
Aggregator	Score
Metacritic	(PC) 65/100 (PS3) 67/100 (X360) 69/100

Review scores
Publication	Score
Eurogamer	6/10
GameSpot	6/10
IGN	7.3/10

Turok received "mixed or average" reviews, according to review aggregator Metacritic.

GameTrailers, which gave the game 8.3/10, highlighted the game's use of the Unreal Engine 3, believing it to be "the best use of the tech outside of Epic's own efforts" and praising the modeling and animation of the dinosaurs in particular. 1UP.com gave the game a score of C+, specifically complaining about its stealth mechanics, the use of camera shaking, and occasional graphical glitches in the PlayStation 3 version. Hyper's Yuri Spadeface commended the game for its "solid frame rate" but criticised the "frustrating level design and average execution". Turok received 3/5 from X-Play, who commented on its aim-assist being woefully inadequate both in multiplayer and singleplayer, but praised its graphics and "outlook".

Turok was a commercial success, shifting over 1 million units in its first two months of sales. The game was popular enough for Propaganda Games to begin working on a sequel for the Xbox 360 before the developer was shuttered.
