= Turok 3: Shadow of Oblivion =

2000 video game

- North American Nintendo 64 box art
- Developer: Acclaim Studios Austin (Note: Nightdive Studios developed and published the 2023 remaster.)
- Publisher: Acclaim Entertainment
- Director: David Dienstbier
- Producer: Jeff Everett
- Designers: Andy Schwalenberg; Chuck Lupher; Jeff Shelton
- Programmer: Dave Smith
- Artists: Scott Brocker; Michael Janke
- Composer: Nelson Everhart
- Series: Turok
- Platforms: Nintendo 64; Nintendo Switch; PlayStation 4; PlayStation 5; Windows; Xbox One; Xbox Series X/S
- Release: Nintendo 64: NA: August 31, 2000; EU: September 8, 2000; Switch, PS4, PS5, Windows, Xbox One, Xbox Series X/S: WW: November 30, 2023
- Genre: First-person shooter
- Modes: Single-player, multiplayer

Turok 3: Shadow of Oblivion is a 2000 first-person shooter video game developed by Acclaim Studios Austin and published by Acclaim Entertainment for the Nintendo 64. It is the third main installment of the Turok series, and a sequel to 1998's Turok 2: Seeds of Evil. The game received generally favorable reviews from critics. A separate game, also titled Turok 3: Shadow of Oblivion, which is set in the same universe but follows a different storyline, was released for the Game Boy Color in 2000. A remastered version of the game developed by Nightdive Studios released on November 30, 2023 for Nintendo Switch, PlayStation 4, PlayStation 5, Windows, Xbox One, and Xbox Series X/S.

== Gameplay ==
The player engages in a boss fight with an enemy. The game's HUD at the bottom left corner shows the player's health and ammunition.

Turok 3: Shadow of Oblivion is a first-person shooter. The player can choose to play the game as either Danielle or Joseph, who both have unique abilities. For example, Danielle can jump higher and carry high-powered weapons, while Joseph can crawl into crevices and use the sniper rifle in conjunction with the night vision goggles. Each character has eight main weapons that may be upgraded in different ways for a total of 16 weapons per character, although some of them are shared. Players can save their progress at any time with the use of a Controller Pak.

In addition to the single-player campaign, Shadow of Oblivion features a multiplayer mode where various players can compete against each other in eight game types, including blood lust, capture the flag, last stand, and monkey tag. Multiplayer games can be played in 42 different maps and can also include bots. The multiplayer mode is not included in the remaster.

== Plot ==
When the Primagen's Lightship was destroyed at the end of Turok 2: Seeds of Evil, the chain reaction it triggered was so powerful that the universe as it existed was completely eradicated, pushing Oblivion, a monstrous cosmic entity that consumes bodies of the living and reigned before the birth of the universe, to the very brink of destruction. Though totally ravaged, Oblivion survived and now desperately seeks a means to punch through the Netherscape that separates the living world from the Lost Lands, a strange and primitive world where time has no meaning. The last shreds of the pure energy source that created the living world and nearly wiped out Oblivion are contained within the Light Burden, the bag that every member of the Turok lineage has carried. Deep within the Lost Lands, Oblivion's henchmen have a massive headquarters from where they assemble their armies and direct their operations.

The game begins with the current Turok, Joshua Fireseed, having dreams of a child that must be protected, as he is the last of the Fireseed lineage. During that night, Oblivion Spawns teleport into his home and try to kill Joshua in his sleep. Joshua catches them and fights, but is outnumbered. He then tells his sister Danielle and his brother Joseph to escape, while he stays behind with a bomb in his hand to blow the Spawns away, along with himself. While Danielle and Joseph drive away, they are attacked by a monster, but Adon, a female alien who helped Joshua in the previous game, saves and teleports them to a council meeting to deal with the situation of Oblivion. They decide that either Danielle or Joseph must become the next Turok, and the player must choose. The player will eventually have to infiltrate the enemies' headquarters to destroy the scourge of the universe.

== Development ==
Turok 3: Shadow of Oblivion was developed by Acclaim Studios Austin and published by Acclaim Entertainment. Before production of the game began, the development team decided to remove the Nintendo 64 Expansion Paks from their development kits to guarantee a smooth frame rate on a standard Nintendo 64. Instead, high-resolution and letterbox settings were developed for owners of Expansion Paks. The team rewrote the graphics engine, resulting in the game having a 30 degree wider field of view and two to four times the draw distance that Turok 2 had. A co-operative mode, where two players, one as Danielle and the other as Joseph, would play through the campaign missions together, was originally intended to be included in the game, but was ultimately dropped due to technical difficulties related to Danielle and Joseph's unique abilities.

Unlike previous Turok games, where artists were limited to pre-designed levels, Shadow of Oblivion features maps that were entirely built to suit the designers' requirements. Levels also include events that unfold independently of the player's actions. As creative director David Dienstbier explained, players can "see police choppers swooping throughout the world. Police drive up to certain buildings and charge into the building to go fight. Some of this stuff is scripted specifically around the player's actions and movements, and some of it takes place completely independent of where the player is". In the weeks leading up to the game's release, the development team was composed of 21 people and worked 24-hour shifts. The game was released on August 31, 2000, in North America. A separate game, also titled Turok 3: Shadow of Oblivion, was released for the Game Boy Color in 2000. Although set in the same world, it follows a different storyline.

== Reception ==
Reception

Aggregate score
Aggregator	Score
Metacritic	77/100

Review scores
Publication	Score
CNET Gamecenter	9/10
Electronic Gaming Monthly	8.17/10 (Note: Two critics of Electronic Gaming Monthly gave the game each a score of 8/10, and the other gave it 8.5/10.)
EP Daily	7.5/10
Game Informer	8/10
GameFan	(E.M.) 98% 89% (Note: In GameFan's viewpoint of the game, three critics gave it each a score of 94, 89, and 83.)
GameSpot	7.9/10
Hyper	72%
IGN	7.4/10
N64 Magazine	82%
Next Generation	4/5
Nintendo Power	8/10

Turok 3: Shadow of Oblivion received generally favorable reviews from critics. Mark Green of N64 Magazine described it as a "gigantic, gorgeous game that's packed with goodness and perfectly playable in every way", but noted that the game failed to topple Rare's Perfect Dark, an earlier first-person shooter that he felt the Turok 3 team was unlikely to better. GameSpot praised the game, stating that it "concentrates upon what made the Turok franchise a best-seller instead of attempting to one-up the competition, making it in many ways the best Turok yet". The Electric Playground highlighted the game's unique weapons and multiplayer deathmatch variants, but overall felt that the game was worthier as a rental than as an actual purchase. NextGen concluded that "despite a few problems, Turok 3 is a satisfying experience that closes this [Nintendo 64] series in style. [First-person shooter] fans will not be disappointed."

Writing for IGN, reviewer Fran Mirabella III praised the option for players to save the game at any time, saying that "you can no longer live in fear of playing for 45 minutes only to end up getting whacked before you reach a save beacon". However, he criticized the game's inconsistent frame rate and the fact that the game can occasionally look worse than its predecessor. Similarly, GamePro's The D-Pad Destroyer said that the game's "sloppy" frame rate discourages the use of "awesome" multiplayer options, especially in 4-player mode. (Note: GamePro gave the game two 3.5/5 scores for graphics and sound, and two 4/5 scores for control and fun factor in one review.) The Enforcer, however, had a different opinion: "If you're a fan of the franchise, you'll find a lot to like about Turok 3. Its intense single-player adventure and extensive multiplayer mode will have you fragging till the wee morning hours." (Note: GamePro gave the game three 4/5 scores for graphics, sound, and fun factor, and 3.5/5 for control in another review.) Nevertheless, Nintendo Power highlighted the realistic character models and the cinematics for their lip-synched speech, a feature that is uncommon in Nintendo 64 games.
