= Turok (video game series) =

- Genre: First-person shooter
- Developers: Acclaim Studios Austin (1997–2002); Propaganda Games (2008); Pillow Pig Games (2019–2022); Saber Interactive
- Publishers: Acclaim Entertainment (1997–2002); Disney Interactive Studios (2008); Universal Studios Interactive Entertainment (2019); Pillow Pig Games (2019–2022); Saber Interactive
- Platforms: Nintendo 64, Microsoft Windows, Game Boy, Game Boy Color, Game Boy Advance, PlayStation 2, Xbox, GameCube, Xbox 360, PlayStation 3, Xbox One, Nintendo Switch, PlayStation 4, PlayStation 5, Xbox Series X/S
- First release: Turok: Dinosaur Hunter; March 4, 1997
- Latest release: Turok (video game); February 3, 2008
- Parent series: Turok

Turok is a series of first-person shooter video games based on the comic book character of the same name. It is set in a primitive world inhabited by dinosaurs and other creatures. The series was originally developed by Acclaim Studios Austin as Iguana Entertainment and published by Acclaim Entertainment from March 4, 1997 until Acclaim's bankruptcy on September 1, 2004. A series reboot was then developed by Propaganda Games and published by Disney Interactive Studios under the Touchstone Interactive banner. The series generated more than $250 million in revenue by 2002.

== Games ==
Release timeline
1997	Turok: Dinosaur Hunter
1998	Turok 2: Seeds of Evil
1999	Turok: Rage Wars
2000	Turok 3: Shadow of Oblivion
2001
2002	Turok: Evolution
2003–2007
2008	Turok
2009–2018
2019	Turok: Escape from Lost Valley
2020–2025
2026	Turok: Origins

=== Turok: Dinosaur Hunter ===
The first game in the series. Developed by Iguana Entertainment and published by Acclaim Entertainment for the Nintendo 64 console and personal computer platforms in 1997. A remastered version developed by Nightdive Studios was released for Windows (through Steam) and Xbox One in 2015 and 2018 respectively. The remastered version was also released on the Nintendo Switch on March 18, 2019 and on PlayStation 4 on February 25, 2021.

=== Turok 2: Seeds of Evil ===
The sequel to Dinosaur Hunter, released for the Nintendo 64 in late 1998 and ported to Windows in 1999. A separate game, also titled Turok 2: Seeds of Evil, was released for the Game Boy Color in 1998. Although set in the same fictional universe, the Game Boy Color game follows a different storyline. Just like the first game, a remastered version developed by Nightdive Studios was released for Windows (through Steam) and Xbox One in 2017 and 2018, respectively. The remastered version also came out on the Nintendo Switch in 2019.

=== Turok: Rage Wars ===
A non-canon game that was released for the Nintendo 64 in 1999. A Game Boy Color version followed in 2000 but shared little in common with its home console counterpart.

=== Turok 3: Shadow of Oblivion ===
The sequel to Seeds of Evil, was released in 2000 for the Nintendo 64. A Game Boy Color version was released but shared nothing in common with its console counterpart. A remastered version of the game developed by Nightdive Studios released on November 30, 2023 for Nintendo Switch, PlayStation 4, PlayStation 5, Windows, Xbox One, and Xbox Series X/S.

=== Turok: Evolution ===
The prequel to Dinosaur Hunter, released for the PlayStation 2, Xbox and GameCube in 2002. A 2D side-scrolling version was also released for the Game Boy Advance. A port for Microsoft Windows was released in 2003 for the European market.

=== Turok ===
A reboot that is unrelated to the previous games. It was developed by Propaganda Games and published by Disney Interactive Studios under the Touchstone Interactive banner. Released in 2008 for the Xbox 360 and PlayStation 3. It was later ported to Microsoft Windows that same year.

=== Turok: Escape from Lost Valley ===
Developed by Pillow Pig Games and published by Universal Studios Interactive Entertainment on July 25, 2019, for Xbox One and PC. It is unrelated to the previous games, instead based on the early Turok comics of the 1950s, and with characters animated in the chibi style. The game is played from an isometric perspective with Turok and his brother Andar fighting numerous creatures as they venture through the Lost Valley. The game's creation came as a result of a 2018 contest, by Universal and Unity Technologies, for entrants to create a game based on Universal properties. More than 500 entries were made, and the Turok game was among the finalists. It was later delisted from all digital stores on January 7, 2022.

=== Turok: Origins ===
A new game was announced on December 12, 2024, during the Game Awards. Titled Turok: Origins, the game will be developed and published by Saber Interactive. It is scheduled to be released in the Spring of 2027 for the PlayStation 5, Xbox Series X/S, Nintendo Switch 2 and Steam.

== Cancelled games ==
=== Turok 2: Seeds of Evil Sega Dreamcast game ===
After the release of the N64 version of Turok 2, Acclaim had intended to make a Sega Dreamcast version.

=== Untitled Turok Game Boy Advance game ===
A prototype game for the Game Boy Advance system, planned for release sometime before Turok: Evolution.

=== Untitled Turok: Evolution sequel ===
After the release of Turok: Evolution, Acclaim Studios Austin placed a small team in charge of creating a sequel. The project was not picked up, and the team moved on to other projects.

=== Turok 2 ===
Turok 2, known chronologically as Turok 6 in various news articles, was a planned and partially developed sequel to Turok from 2008. It was eventually cancelled mid-development, due to many layoffs at Propaganda Games.
