= Turok =

Fictional Native American character

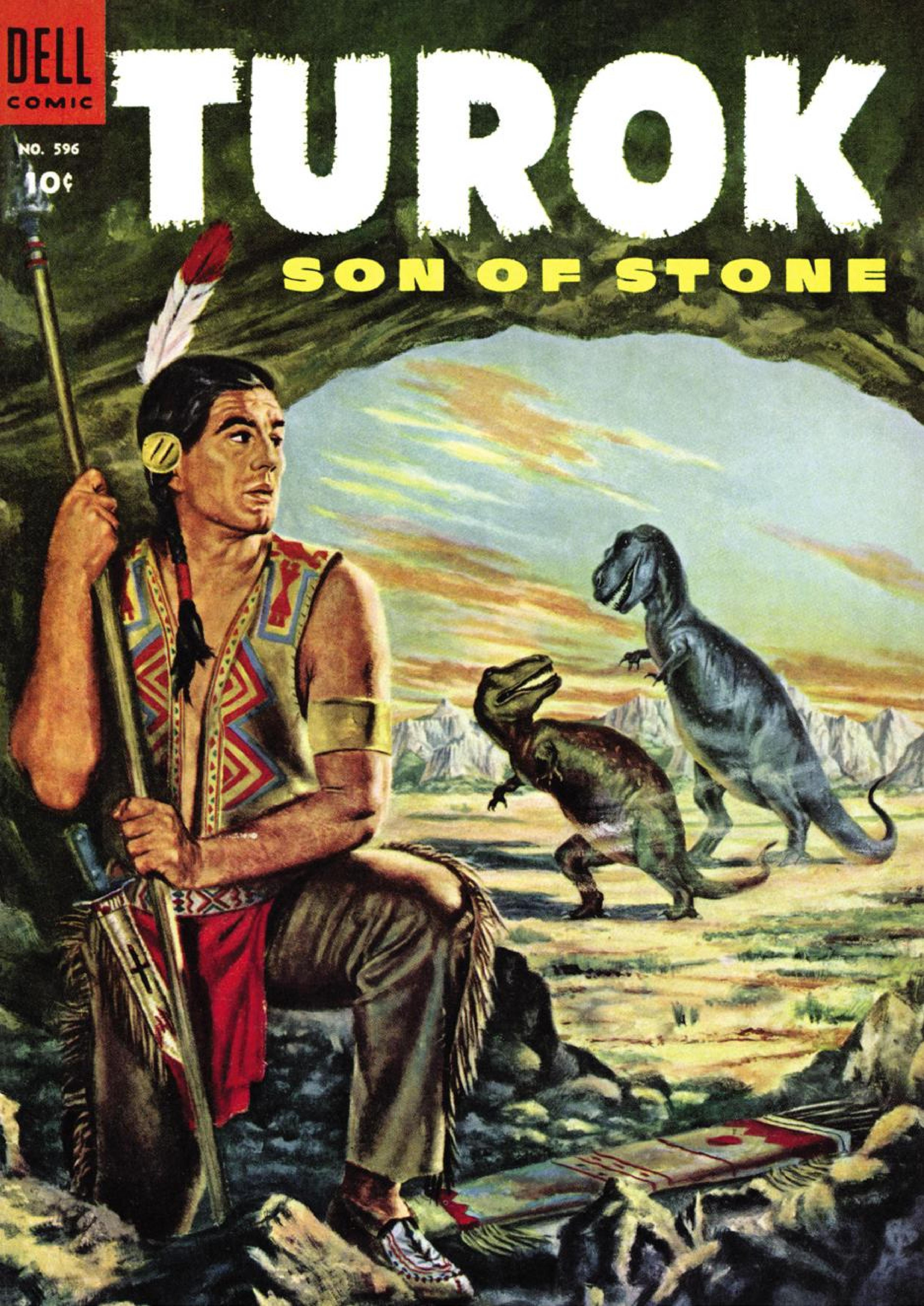
- Turok in his debut, cover of Four Color Comics #596

Publication information
- Publisher: Western Publishing through licensee Dell Comics
- First appearance: Four Color Comics #596 (October/November 1954)

In-story information
- Species: Human
- Place of origin: Earth
- Abilities: Olympic-level athlete; Master archer, knife fighter, marksman, hunter, tracker, wilderness survivalist

Turok (/ˈtʊərɒk/) is a fictional character who first appeared in American comic books published by Western Publishing through licensee Dell Comics. He debuted in Four Color Comics #596 (October/November 1954). After a second Four Color appearance (#656, October 1955), the character graduated to his own title – Turok, Son of Stone (#3, March–May 1956) – published first by Dell and then by Gold Key Comics from 1956 to 1982. Subsequently, he appeared in titles published by Valiant Comics, Dark Horse Comics and Dynamite Comics.

The character also inspired a popular video game series, starting with Turok: Dinosaur Hunter, published by Acclaim Entertainment in 1997. Several sequels would be released in the following years for various gaming consoles.

== Publishing history ==
=== Western Publishing ===
Turok: Son of Stone #93 (November 1974 cover) (copy of Dell #19 (March–May 1960))

The original comic, titled Turok, Son of Stone, was illustrated by Rex Maxon. The writer-creator credit for the characters of Turok and Andar is disputed, with historians citing Dell editor Matthew H. Murphy, Gaylord Du Bois, and Paul S. Newman as the feature's earliest writers.

The Western Publishing version of Turok was a Pre-Columbian era Native American (identified as Mandan in the first issue, on page 21 and 32 of Dell Four Color #596) who, along with his brother, Andar, finds himself lost in an isolated valley populated by dinosaurs. Turok refers to many of the prehistoric animals as "honkers" or by their most obvious characteristics (tyrannosaurus are called "runners", pterosaurs are called "flyers", velociraptors are "screamers", plesiosaurs are "sea demons", Triceratops are "rammers", etc.). The Du Bois stories involve Turok and Andar seeking a way out of the valley. Du Bois was influenced by his visits to Carlsbad Caverns in New Mexico, and developed the "Lost Valley" from his visits to the area.

After two appearances in Four Color #596 and #656, the title ran 27 issues (#3–29) published by Dell Comics (1956–1962); then issues #30–125 (1962–1980) from Gold Key Comics; and finally issues #126–130 (1981–82) under Western's Whitman Comics imprint. George Wilson painted several covers for the series. The principal interior artist after Maxon's early work was Alberto Giolitti.

The first Turok one-shot (Four Color #596) was originally written by Du Bois as a Young Hawk story. Young Hawk was an earlier Native American comic book feature Du Bois created, which appeared in Dell's The Lone Ranger comic book series and had also been drawn by Rex Maxon.

Although the artists had long since established Turok as an adult, Du Bois's last scripts for the series (Turok #8) still introduced stories by describing Turok and Andar as "youths", more befitting Young Hawk than Turok (though Andar was depicted as a youth). The first story in that issue begins as "Turok and Andar, Indian youths, have found their way into a strange network of deep canyons in the Carlsbad area, where ancient forms of life still exist ... They have found no way to get out". The second story begins where "trapped in a deep canyon in the Carlsbad area of New Mexico, Turok and Andar, two Indian youths, have met ancient forms of life which have disappeared from all other parts of the world".

In Du Bois' last Turok story (issue #8, "Turok Seeks the Trail to Freedom", in which Turok encounters a herd of horses, which he calls "slim-legged creatures", having no word for them, as the horse had not yet been reintroduced to the Americas by the Spanish), Turok scales the cliffs, and escapes the Lost Valley. However, he returns for Andar, who was left behind after being injured. Soon, an avalanche permanently seals the way out and the series begins anew. Paul S. Newman began writing the Turok stories afterward.

=== Valiant Comics ===
Valiant's Turok: Dinosaur Hunter. Art by Bart Sears.

In May 1992, Valiant Comics introduced a revamped Turok, debuting him in Magnus: Robot Fighter #12. With this version, the concept and setting were altered. Turok and Andar were now 18th-century Native Americans. The isolated valley became "the Lost Lands" – a land where demons, dinosaurs and aliens flourish and where "time has no meaning". A cosmic anomaly causes time in the Lost Lands to move in a self-contained loop (which means that while millions of years pass outside of it, inside it, time barely moves at all). "Unity", a line-wide Valiant Comics crossover storyline, altered the concept even further. The crossover's main villain, a psychotic superpowered being known as Mothergod, uses the Lost Lands as her base of operations. She outfits dinosaurs with intelligence-boosting implants, turning them into "bionisaurs".

In the aftermath of the final battle between Mothergod and the Valiant Universe heroes, the Lost Lands begin to disappear. Turok and Andar are tossed into a post-apocalyptic future Earth, and a group of bionisaurs make it to Earth along with them. Following this, they become ruthless hunters trying to contend with the demons and aliens that exist in the future world, as well as various Lovecraftian abominations and high-tech future warriors. Mothergod seizes power in this future and begins to rebuild her empire and attempts to hunt down and kill Turok and Andar.

A new volume of Turok's own comic, Turok: Dinosaur Hunter, was launched in 1993. Valiant published 53 issues before Acclaim purchased the company, including Turok: Dinosaur Hunter #0–47, Original Turok: Son of Stone #1–2, Turok: Dinosaur Hunter Yearbook in 1994, and the two-issue miniseries Turok the Hunted in 1996. Turok: Dinosaur Hunter #1 was the sixth best-selling comic of the month of June, surpassed only by the first five installments of "Reign of the Supermen!".

=== Acclaim Comics ===
A new Turok series, titled simply Turok, was published by Acclaim Comics in 1997 and 1998. In the revamped Acclaim Comics universe, Turok is not the character's name, but rather a title meaning "Son of Stone". The Turok must protect the barriers between this dimension and the others—the axis of all worlds being the Lost Lands, a place where creatures from across time and space had been dragged and where "time has no meaning". Joshua Fireseed, the latest Turok, must travel between alternate universes stopping those who would try to conquer the Lost Lands, and thus all of the multiverse with it.

=== Dark Horse Comics ===
A new Turok series, again titled Turok: Son of Stone, was launched by Dark Horse Comics, under license by Classic Media in 2010. The title was written by former Valiant Comics writer Jim Shooter and illustrated by Eduardo Francisco. This was one of a series of titles released by Dark Horse that year based on classic Gold Key Comics properties. The entire line, including Turok, was short-lived, with Turok lasting only four issues.

=== Dynamite Comics ===
Dynamite Entertainment launched a new Turok comic series, titled Turok: Dinosaur Hunter, as well as books based on other Gold Key Comics properties, as part of a licensing deal with DreamWorks Classics. The creative team on the title was Greg Pak and Mirko Colak. This comics series was released in 2014. The series ended after 12 issues.

In 2016, Turok appeared in a five-issue miniseries called Gold Key: Alliance. Written by Phil Hester and illustrated by Brent Peeples, the book starred heroes from multiple Gold Key Comics titles.

Dynamite published a second Turok comic series titled Turok, written by Chuck Wendig and illustrated by Álvaro Sarraseca, in August 2017. Lasting for five issues, it also featured backup stories starring fellow Gold Key character Doctor Spektor.

A third Turok comic series, once again titled Turok, written by Ron Marz and illustrated by Roberto Castro was published starting in January 2019. This series also lasted for five issues.

=== Image Comics ===
Image Comics and Skybound Entertainment will release a new Turok comic, titled Turok: Son of Stone as part of their Skybound Visions imprint. The book will be written by Stephen Graham Jones and illustrated by Leandro Fernández ,with colors by Lee Loughridge, and lettering by Tom Napolitano. The first issue will release on March 10th, 2027

== Fictional character biography ==
Turoks have included, in chronological order from earliest to most recent:

- Turok: Native American warrior trapped in the Lost Valley. Hero of the original comics, Dark Horse Comics series, Dynamite Entertainment series and animated film.
- Tal'Set: Saquin warrior who became Turok in the 1800s and is the hero of Turok: Evolution and Turok: Dinosaur Hunter.
- Carl Fireseed, uncle of Joshua Fireseed, Turok from 1982 to 1997.
- Joshua Fireseed, nephew of Carl Fireseed, Turok since 1997, hero of the Acclaim Comics and Turok 2: Seeds of Evil.
- Danielle Fireseed and Joseph Fireseed, younger sister and brother of Joshua Fireseed, heroes of Turok 3: Shadow of Oblivion.
- Joseph Turok, Half-Kiowa Space Marine and hero of Turok.

== Collected editions ==
In 2009, Dark Horse Comics started an archive series to reprint the original comics:

- Turok: Son of Stone Archives:
  - Volume 1 (collects Four Color Comics #596 and 656 and Turok #3–6, 224 pages, March 2009, ISBN 1-59582-155-4)
  - Volume 2 (collects Turok #7–12, 224 pages, July 2009, ISBN 1-59582-275-5)
  - Volume 3 (collects Turok #13–18, 224 pages, August 2009, ISBN 1-59582-281-X)
  - Volume 4 (collects Turok #19–24, 224 pages, November 2009, ISBN 1-59582-343-3)
  - Volume 5 (collects Turok #25–30, 224 pages, March 2010, ISBN 1-59582-442-1)
  - Volume 6 (collects Turok #31–35,37, 224 pages, July 2010, ISBN 1-59582-484-7) (#36 reprinted issue #14)
  - Volume 7 (collects Turok #38–43, 216 pages, November 2010, ISBN 1-59582-565-7)
  - Volume 8 (collects Turok #44–50, 232 pages, April 2011, ISBN 1-59582-641-6)
  - Volume 9 (collects Turok #51–53, 55–56, 58–59, 232 pages, November 2010, ISBN 1-59582-789-7) (#54 reprinted issue #26 and #57 reprinted issue #17)
  - Volume 10 (collects Turok #60–67, March 2012, ISBN 1-59582-861-3)

=== Additional collections ===
- Turok: Son of Stone (by Tony Bedard, 88 pages, September 3, 2008, ISBN 1-59582-201-1) Adaptation of the 2008 DVD film.
- Turok: Son of Stone Volume 1: Aztlán (by Jim Shooter, Eduardo Francisco, and James Harren, 96 pages, December 21, 2011, ISBN 1-59582-690-4) Collects the four-issue 2010 Dark Horse Comics series.
- Turok: Dinosaur Hunter Vol. 1: Conquest (by Greg Pak, Mirko Colak, and Cory Smith, 128 pages, September 9, 2014, ISBN 1606905201) Collects issues #1–4 of the 2014 Dynamite Comics series.
- Turok: Dinosaur Hunter Vol. 2: West (by Greg Pak and Takeshi Miyazawa, 120 pages, April 22, 2015, ISBN 1606905988) Collects issues #5–8 of the 2014 Dynamite Comics series.
- Turok: Dinosaur Hunter Vol. 3: Raptor Forest (by Greg Pak, Paul Tobin, Lee Ferguson, Ruairi Coleman, Stephen Downey, and Felipe Cunha, 128 pages, August 12, 2015, ISBN 1606906933) Collects issues #9–12 of the 2014 Dynamite Comics series.
- Turok Vol. 1: Blood Hunt (by Chuck Wendig and Álvaro Sarraseca, 140 pages, May 16, 2018, ISBN 1524106526) Collects issues #1–5 of the 2017 Dynamite Comics series.

== In other media ==
=== Video games ===
The first Turok video game, titled Turok: Dinosaur Hunter, was released in 1997 for the Nintendo 64 console. The game was followed by numerous sequels, released for Nintendo 64, Game Boy, Game Boy Color, PC, PlayStation 2, Xbox, GameCube and the Game Boy Advance. In 2008, the video game reboot Turok was released for PlayStation 3, PC and Xbox 360. In 2024, a new game in the franchise titled "Turok: Origins" was announced, and is scheduled to be released in Spring 2027.

=== Mobile games ===
The initial mobile game was developed by Disney's Living Mobile Studios and released by Touchstone in 2008. In it, Joseph Turok is a member of the Whiskey Company's elite squad. Turok survives an airplane crash, and must fend off dinosaurs.

=== Books ===
After the success of the Turok video games, a series of non-canon Turok novels written by Michael Teitelbaum was released, dealing with the same storyline as the games. The first book was titled Way of the Warrior. The second and third books, Seeds of Evil and Arena of Doom, concerned Joshua Fireseed's fight against the Primagen and the Campaigner, respectively. A fourth novel, Path of Destruction, was published in November 1998.

=== Animated DVD ===
In early 2008, a 70-minute animated DVD titled Turok: Son of Stone was released by Classic Media. The screen story was written by Evan Baily and Tony Bedard, with a screenplay by Bedard. In this version, Andar is Turok's nephew, not his brother. Adam Beach provides the voice of Turok, with Irene Bedard as the voice of Catori (the wife of Turok's brother, Nashoba), Robert Knepper as the main villain Chichak, and Cree Summer as the voice of Sepinta. Curt Geda, Dan Riba, and Frank Squillace each directed a third of the movie. Ex-Disney (Aladdin and Hercules: The Animated Series) producer Tad Stones was the supervising director.

=== Film ===
Actor Adam Beach, who had voiced the character in the animated film Turok: Son of Stone, said he was involved in a planned Turok live-action film, and that the script was being written. There has been no updates to this since 2008.
