= List of arcade video games: N =

This is a list of arcade video games organized alphabetically by name. It does not include PC or console games unless they were also released in video arcades. See Lists of video games for related lists.

Title	Alternate Title(s)	Year	Manufacturer	Genre(s)	Max. Players	PCB Model
N-Sub	—	1980	Sega	Shooter	1	
N.Y. Captor	—	1985	Taito	Shooter	1	
Nagano Winter Olympics '98	Hyper Olympic in Nagano^{JP}	1997	Konami	Sports	2	
NAM-1975	—	1990	SNK	Shooting game	2	
Namco Classic Collection Vol. 1	—	1995	Namco	Compilation	2	
Namco Classic Collection Vol. 2	—	1996	Namco	Compilation	2	
Name That Tune	—	1986	Bally Sente	Quiz game	2	
Namenayo	—	1982	Cat's		2	
Naname De Magic!	Diagonal Magic	1994	Atlus	Puzzle	2	
Narc	—	1988	Williams	Run and gun	2	
NASCAR Arcade	—	2000	Sega	Racing	2	
NATO Defense	—	1982	Pacific Novelty	Maze	2	
Natsuiro Mahjong	—	1989	Video System	Mahjong video game	2	
Naughty Boy	—	1982	Jaleco	Run and gun	2	
Naughty Mouse	—	1981	Amenip	Platformer	2	
Navarone	—	1980	Namco	Fixed shooter	2	
NBA Hangtime	—	1996	Midway	Sports	4	
NBA Jam	—	1993	Midway	Sports	4	
NBA Jam Extreme	—	1996	Acclaim	Sports	4	ZN-1
NBA Jam Tournament Edition	—	1994	Midway	Sports	4	
NBA Maximum Hangtime	—	1996	Midway	Sports	4	
NBA Play by Play	—	1998	Konami	Sports	2	
NBA Showtime: NBA on NBC	—	1998	Midway	Sports	4	
Nebula	—	1980	Data East			DECO
NebulasRay	—	1994	Namco	Scrolling shooter	2	
Neck-n-Neck	—	1992	Bundra	Racing	1	
Need for Speed	—	2000	Global VR	Racing	1	
Need for Speed: Carbon	—	2008	Global VR	Racing	1	
Need for Speed: GT	—	2003	Global VR	Racing	1	
Need for Speed: Underground	—	2005	Global VR	Racing	1	
Nekketsu Grand-Prix Gal	—	1991	Nichibutsu	Mahjong video game	2	
Nekketsu Mahjong Sengen! AFTER 5	—	1991	Video System	Mahjong video game	2	
Nemo	—	1990	Capcom	Platformer	2	CPS1
Neo Bomberman	—	1997	Hudson Soft	Maze	2	
Neo Drift Out - New Technology	—	1996	Visco Corporation	Racing	2	
NeoGeo Battle Coliseum	—	2005	SNK	Fighting	2	
NeoGeo Cup '98 - The Road to the Victory	—	1998	SNK	Sports	2	
Neo Mr. Do!	—	1996	Visco	Maze	2	
Neo Turf Masters	Big Tournament Golf	1996	SNK	Sports	2	NeoGeo
Nerae! Top Star: Geinoukai Survival Mahjong	—	1990	Nichibutsu	Mahjong video game	1	
Neratte Chu	—	1996	Seta		1	
Net Select Keiba Victory Furlong	—	2005	Sammy Corporation			
Net Wars	—	1983	Esco			
Netchuu Pro Yakyuu 2002	—	2002	Namco	Sports		
Nettou Quiz Champion	Se Gye Hweng Dan Ultra Champion^{KOR}	1995	Nakanihon Wreath	Quiz game		
Nettou! Gekitou! Quiztou!!	—	1993	Namco	Quiz game		
New Cross Pang	—	1999	F2 System			
The New Crystal Maze	—	1993	Barcrest		2	
New Fantasia	—	1995	Comad			
New Hidden Catch '98	—	1999	Eolith			
NEW Moero!! Pro Yakyuu Homerun Kyousou	—	1988	Jaleco			
New Pro Bowl	—	1996	Able			
New Rally-X	—	1981	Namco	Driving	2	
New Sinbad 7	—	1983	Artic Electronics			
New Super Triv III	—	1988	Status Games			
New Tropical Angel	—	1983	Irem			
New York New York	Waga Seishun no Arcadia^{JP}	1980				
New Zero Team	—	1997	Seibu Kaihatsu			
NewZealand Story, The	—	1988	Taito	Platformer	2	
The Next Space	—	1989	SNK			
NFL	—	1993	Advanced Video Technology			
NFL Blitz	—	1997	Midway	Sports	4	
NFL Blitz '99	—	1998	Midway	Sports	4	
NFL Blitz 2000 Gold Edition	—	1999	Midway	Sports	4	
NFL Classic Football	—	2003	Namco	Sports		
NFL Football	—	1983	Midway	Sports	2	
NFL Hard Yardage	—	1993	Strata Group	Sports	2	
Nibbler	—	1982	Rock-ola			
Nicktoons Racing	—	2003	Chicago Gaming	Racing		
Night Bunny	—	1985	Nichibutsu			
Night Driver	—	1976	Atari	Racing	1	
Night Love	—	1986	Central Denshi			
Night Mare	—	1982	Playmatic			
Night Raid	—	2001	Takumi	Scrolling shooter	2	
Night Slashers	—	1993	Data East	Beat 'em up	2	
Night Star	—	1983	Data East	Scrolling shooter	2	
Night Stocker	—	1986	Bally Sente		2	
Night Striker	—	1989	Taito	Rail shooter	1	
Night Warriors: Darkstalkers' Revenge	Vampire Hunter: Darkstalkers' Revenge ^{JP}	1995	Capcom	Fighting	2	CPS2
Nightmare in the Dark	—	2000	Eleven/Gavaking		2	
Ninja Assault	—	2000	Namco			
Ninja Baseball Bat Man	Yakyū Kakutō League Man ^{JP}	1993	Irem	Beat 'em up	4	
Ninja Clowns	—	1991	Strata Group	Beat 'em up	2	
Ninja Combat	—	1990	Alpha Denshi		2	
Ninja Commando	—	1992	Alpha Denshi		2	
Ninja Emaki	Youma Ninpou Chou	1986	Nichibutsu	Multidirectional shooter	2	
Ninja Gaiden	Ninja Ryukenden ^{JP} Shadow Warriors ^{World}	1988	Tecmo	Beat 'em up	2	
Ninja Hayate	—	1984	Taito	Action		
Ninja Kazan	Iga Ninjutsuden - Goshin no Sho	1984	Jaleco	Platformer	2	
The Ninja Kids	—	1991	Taito	Beat 'em up	2	
Ninja Master's: Haō Ninpō Chō	—	1996	ADK	Fighting	2	
Ninja Mission	—	1987	Arcadia Systems	Beat 'em up	2	Arcadia
Ninja Spirit	Saigo no Nindou	1988	Irem	Platformer	2	
The Ninja Warriors	—	1988	Taito	Beat em up	2	
Ninja-Kid	—	1984	Taito	Platformer	2	
Nitro Ball	Gun Ball	1992	Data East		3	
No Man's Land	—	1980	Universal		2	
Noah's Ark	—	1983	Enter-Tech			
Noboranka	—	1986	Game Electronics		2	
Nostradamus	—	1993	Face	Scrolling shooter	2	
Noukone Puzzle Takoron	—	2007	Compile			NAOMI GD-ROM
Nouryoku Koujou Iinkai	—	1995	Tecmo	Quiz	2	
Nova 2001	—	1983	UPL	Fixed shooter	2	
NSM Poker	—	198?	NSM			
Numan Athletics	—	1993	Namco	Sports	2	
Number Crash	—	1983	Hanshin Goraku			
Nyanpai: Musume Pai	—	1996	Nichibutsu			
