= Look Outside =

- Developer: Francis Coulombe
- Publisher: Devolver Digital
- Writers: Francis Coulombe; Eric Shumaker
- Composer: Eric Shumaker
- Engine: RPG Maker
- Platforms: Microsoft Windows; Nintendo Switch; Nintendo Switch 2; PlayStation 4; PlayStation 5
- Release: Microsoft Windows; March 21, 2025; Switch, Switch 2, PS4, PS5; October 30, 2026
- Genres: Survival horror; role-playing
- Mode: Single-player

Look Outside is a 2025 survival horror role-playing video game developed by Francis Coulombe and published by Devolver Digital. The game takes place in an apartment building as a strange phenomenon outside begins transforming those who observe it into grotesque monsters. The player controls a solitary man named Sam as he survives in the building, exploring different areas, fighting enemies, interacting with other characters, and managing his well-being in the process.

Look Outside began as a game jam submission created in one month. The submission received significant attention online, prompting Coulombe to work with others to turn the game into a full commercial product. Five months after the game jam, the full version of the game was simultaneously announced and released by Devolver Digital. The game attained generally favorable reviews from critics, who praised its monster designs, atmosphere, environments and gameplay. However, its difficulty received mixed opinions, described as both too hard and too easy by different publications.

The game was released on March 21, 2025 for Microsoft Windows. Versions for Nintendo Switch, Nintendo Switch 2, PlayStation 4 and PlayStation 5 are scheduled to release on October 30, 2026.

== Gameplay ==
Look Outside is a survival horror role-playing game (RPG) set inside an apartment building as a worldwide phenomenon outside begins transforming those who observe it into grotesque monsters. The event is scheduled to pass in fifteen in-game days. In this time, the player takes the role of an uneasy-looking, solitary man named Sam, exploring the structure's halls, interacting with other characters, fighting enemies, and scavenging for supplies as they additionally manage Sam's well-being.

Sam can sleep, cook, shower, craft, and engage in various other activities in his apartment that pass the time; certain actions will help to manage stats such as hunger and hygiene, which may cause negative effects if neglected, though items like cookable food and hygiene products are limited in supply. Sam may receive random knocks at his door that he may choose to answer, leading to numerous outcomes. Outside his apartment, Sam can explore other areas of the residential building, allowing him to find weapons, supplies, and various items. He may encounter hostile and friendly transformed beings. Friendly creatures, as well as other normal humans, can be interacted with, and some may request help; hostile creatures commonly must be either fought or avoided. Certain actions, such as killing enemies and stealing items, may cause Sam to experience guilt. While outside the apartment, time only passes when exploring new areas, with time passage accompanied by a rising danger level that makes the building more perilous but rewards the player with more experience points upon returning home at high levels. Multiple locations outside of Sam's apartment exhibit impossible, non-Euclidean architecture.

A battle featuring Sam and three enemies. The lower boxed area doubles as a dialogue screen.

General gameplay features a top-down perspective, but for combat, Look Outside adopts turn-based RPG mechanics similar to EarthBound, also including a weapon durability system, wherein as a character uses a weapon to attack, they have a chance to damage or break it. This chance increases when performing more powerful special attacks, with different types of special attacks being available depending on the weapon used. Look Outside additionally features an enemy distance mechanic, where opponents in a battle may start far away and somewhat obscured, revealing the true extent of their form as they approach, acting as a potential jump scare to the player. For its difficulty, the game offers an easy mode and a normal mode, with easy mode making resources more abundant and allowing the player to save whenever they enter a room for the first time; normal mode only allows the player to save inside their apartment, and only when the danger level has reached a certain threshold, encouraging the player to keep exploring more new areas. After beating the game once, a third mode is added, titled "Cursed Mode." This mode is much harder, also including some new enemies.

== Plot ==
A solitary man named Sam wakes up with a strange urge to look outside. He is distracted by his peeping next-door neighbor, Sybil, who soon warns him not to look, explaining that looking outside had uncertain effects on her body. After leaving his apartment, Sam soon finds that his neighbors who looked outside took on horrific new forms, being driven to varying degrees of insanity, many of them also exhibiting erratic, violent behavior. While exploring the apartment building, Sam eventually meets a robed man named Aster, who explains that he is part of a group of four astronomers trying to study the phenomenon outside. He elaborates that the event is the result of an extraterrestrial object passing through Earth's solar system, inexplicably causing grave changes to any living thing that observes it, directly or indirectly. Aster additionally informs Sam that their group is trying to study the object by gathering any physical records made on it, and that Sam should bring any he finds to the group's leader, Jasper. When meeting Jasper, he explains that they want to commune with the object, which they dub the Visitor, by using four physical records of its form. The different records Sam may potentially find or create include: a photograph, a VHS recording, a painting, and a written description of the Visitor; however, viewing any accurate depiction of the Visitor's appearance will cause Sam to transform, resulting in an instant game over.

=== Endings ===
If fifteen in-game days elapse, the Visitor departs, and the world is left in a chaotic state, with two-thirds of humanity being killed in half a month, and most remaining humans being left transformed. The world is ruled by numerous gargantuan monsters known as The Hundred Gods, with civilization being unable to recover. For the game's other endings, Sam must gather and select four offerings to give to Jasper, each intended to contain a depiction of the Visitor, and meet him on the building's roof. There, any astronomer without a correct offering is unrecognizably transformed, and if no offerings are correct, Sam is too. However, if at least one offering is correct, Sam and any remaining astronomers begin a ritual in which the Visitor is revealed to have the appearance of a giant, multicolored eye, and any present astronomers transform into a singular, powerful creature. If only some offerings were correct, this being dies after being defeated, and Sam goes back inside, finding himself in the process of turning into something massive. If three correct offerings and a guinea pig were included, the animal transforms, assimilating the remaining astronomers. If Sam is defeated by it, it rampages across a devastated Earth, but if Sam defeats it, it devours the Earth entirely. If, instead, all offerings were correct, rather than dying once defeated, the merged astronomers further transform into an angelic being of extreme power. Temporarily lucid in this form, they give Sam the chance to ask them questions to gain answers for humanity, but then urge him to run before they lose control and attack. If Sam flees or is defeated by them, the angelic creature begins flying across the Earth's skies, killing anything it sees. Ninety percent of humanity is wiped out in half a month, and the angelic entity is left as the Earth's ruler.

However, if Sam defeats the astronomers' angelic form, he ascends into the sky, and the Visitor speaks to him. After questioning Sam on the nature of various things, the Visitor explains that it does not want to hurt life, but that it had never seen anything like it before and wanted to observe it, its worldwide effects being unintentional. The Visitor decides it would be best for humanity if it left Earth, lastly informing Sam that the eye he sees is not its true form, offering to show him what it really looks like. If Sam accepts its offer, the true gargantuan extent of its appearance is revealed, but Sam's mind is utterly destroyed, with his body becoming a rapidly growing monster that proceeds to spread across Earth and eradicate humanity. If Sam declines its offer, the Visitor leaves, and Sam finds himself to have transformed into a powerful, monstrous creature, similar to that which is seen in the previously mentioned ending. Despite this, Sam retains his sanity, gaining the ability to control all of his new form at once, and uses his now considerable power to bring supplies and aid to survivors across the Earth. One quarter of humanity is left dead from the disaster, but with Sam spearheading the reconstruction of all cities, society is soon fully rebuilt, and Sam becomes a godlike entity that continually aids humanity.

If Sam manages to find and meet Sybil in person, she can be made to reveal that she has information that is dangerous to all mankind, and has forced herself to forget it. If Sam agrees to keep this information hidden, he can inform the lead astronomer of Sybil's survival. Doing so will cause the astronomers to regain their sanity in their divine form once defeated, and confront the Visitor themselves, before returning to become a savior of humanity, with Sam and his allies surviving and moving on after the Visitor departs.

If Sam attacks Sybil, intent on learning her secret, she will defend herself as a powerful monster. Once defeated, Sam can learn the dangerous truth about the Visitor, which is that all matter on earth originates from it, viewing its form shatters the illusion of individuality and allows for rapid change and mutation. Sam's realization of this information leads to everything on earth mutating and merging together, before being re-absorbed into the Visitor's mass.

If Sam completes the crossword book found in Lyle's apartment (apartment 21), he notices a code in the back of the book, which varies each run. If this code is entered into the safe inside of the room which can be opened with the Pluto disc, a staircase is found to be inside. This staircase leads to a room with a sarcophagus, which when opened, shows another staircase that leads to the Tomb of Crosswords. If the sarcophagus in the back of the room (not to be confused with the one containing a staircase) is opened, a word forms in Sam's head. If he chooses to speak this word, it leads to the Words of Power ending.

If Sam gives the astronomers four specific incorrect offerings, each requiring a battle with a powerful shadow creature to obtain, he is forced to fight the astronomers in their mutated forms. Afterwards, he encounters the Shadow, a masked creature that can be encountered throughout the game, and fights it. The fight ends with Sam's head splitting open, as it does if he fails the ritual, before the Shadow gives him its mask, holding him together. Sam becomes the Shadow, and gains the ability to travel through time, experiencing his past encounters with the Shadow from its perspective, before consuming his past self and destroying both in a temporal paradox.

If Sam repeatedly asks the astronomers about the possibility of killing the Visitor, and then performs the full ritual to encounter the Visitor, he is offered the option to attack it. This results in it destroying him shortly after. However, if he first obtains and completes the video game "Massacre Princess Catholicon", he unlocks the skill Meteor Strike, which is normally impossible to use. Just before the Visitor destroys Sam, Meteor Strike becomes usable, and using it causes Sam to become the player character of Massacre Princess Catholicon and initiate a battle with the Visitor, ultimately defeating it and turning the world into the world of the game.

== Development ==
Look Outside began as a game jam submission for Hawktober Horrors 2024, a month-long competition hosted on the video game distribution site itch.io. The game was developed by Francis Coulombe, a Canadian game developer, artist, and animator, using the RPG Maker game engine, and its music was composed by Eric Shumaker. Coulombe had previously worked for the indie studio Tales of Game's Studios, where he contributed sprite art for the games Barkley, Shut Up and Jam: Gaiden and its cancelled sequel. Following its submission, the game garnered significant attention online. Coulombe had been in contact with video game publisher Devolver Digital at the time due to two other projects. After presenting Look Outside to the publisher, they agreed it had potential, and Coulombe began working with indie developer friends to turn Look Outside into a full commercial product. Believing the surge of popularity to be an opportunity, Coulombe hoped to finish the game within two months, before attention died down. He planned to use the game's traction to introduce his development style to the public, while also providing support and funding for a larger, more ambitious project titled Malison: The Cursed City, a game he had begun working on ten years before Look Outside's development period. Despite the planned release window, the game took five additional months after the release of its jam version to its completion. On March 21, 2025, the game was simultaneously announced by Devolver Digital and released on Steam. On October 23, 2026, versions for Nintendo Switch, Nintendo Switch 2, PlayStation 4 and PlayStation 5 were announced. They are scheduled to release on October 30, 2026.

During development, Coulombe drew inspiration from the 1989 RPG Sweet Home, resulting in the game's particular combination of survival horror and turn-based RPG mechanics. He also chose to add personal upkeep systems in the apartment to set the game's tone and rhythm, making a place where the player felt safe, which would contrast with locations outside the player's apartment, where they would feel wary and unsafe. The apartment originally had chores such as cleaning up and washing dishes, but most were cut to reduce tedium. Coulombe additionally stated that his use of grotesque pixel art came from his time developing Malison: The Cursed City, which features similar grotesque designs.

== Reception ==
Reception

Aggregate scores
Aggregator	Score
Metacritic	83/100
OpenCritic	94% recommend

Review scores
Publication	Score
Shacknews	9/10
CGMagazine	9/10
Siliconera	8/10
Digitally Downloaded	4.5/5

Look Outside received "generally favorable" reviews from critics, according to the review aggregator website Metacritic. OpenCritic determined that 94% of critics recommended the game.

Critics praised the game's particular use of horror, as well as its general atmosphere. Jordan Biordi of CGMagazine praised Look Outside for its ability to create genuine horror from its nightmarish monster designs and disturbing atmosphere while still making them feel compelled to move forward. Lucas White of Shacknews similarly described the game as being "about that character in a horror movie who foolishly opens the door the audience just knows the killer is standing behind", saying that curiosity is a motivating force and that the game's twisted creativity with its environments and scenarios contributed towards it. Cass Marshall of Polygon and Lucas White of Shacknews described the game's monster designs as unnerving, with some being hauntingly memorable. Stephanie Liu of Siliconera noted that those uncomfortable with body horror may want to avoid Look Outside, but praised the game's atmosphere as immaculate, stating that it contributed to the scare factor of most scenarios. Mark Sammut of Game Rant called the game "arguably one of the scariest pixel art games of all time", though stated its "isometric angle" did not lend itself well to scares.

Reviewers responded positively to Look Outside's gameplay, though its difficulty received more mixed opinions. Lucas White of Shacknews described the game as being extremely hard, saying that combat interactions are highly imbalanced against the player, but that the game's easier option was a reasonable compromise for difficulty. Dwayne Jenkins of Vice similarly described the game as challenging, commenting on how the game's normal difficulty will require the player to spend their resources carefully, though also noting that they never gained any party members due to their distrust of other characters. In contrast, Matt Sainsbury of Digitally Downloaded described Look Outside's difficulty as being too easy, saying that after developing a good team, the unknown became more of a hurdle than a menace, further stating that the easy difficulty was the one unfortunate aspect of the game.
