= NBA Jam 99 =

1998 video game

- Developers: Iguana West; Torus Games (GBC)
- Publisher: Acclaim Entertainment (Note: Released under the Acclaim Sports label)
- Series: NBA Jam
- Platforms: Nintendo 64, Game Boy Color
- Release: Nintendo 64: NA: December 3, 1998; EU: December 1998; Game Boy Color: NA: February 1999; EU: 1999
- Genre: Sports
- Modes: Single-player, multiplayer

NBA Jam 99 is a basketball game for the Nintendo 64 and Game Boy Color, released in 1998 by Acclaim Entertainment's Acclaim Sports label and developed by Iguana West. New Jersey Nets forward Keith Van Horn appeared on the cover. Acclaim was unable to secure the license to use Michael Jordan's name or likeness, and as such he was not available as a player for the Chicago Bulls. A player named Roster Guard is available in his place. Rosters are accurate as of July 1, 1998. The game also features Kevin Harlan on play-by-play with Bill Walton as the color commentator. The Utah Jazz' Dan Roberts provides the arena announcing.

== Gameplay ==
The Nintendo 64 version of NBA Jam 99 features 5-on-5 play, replacing NBA Jam's typically 2-on-2 play. (Acclaim had initially announced that the game would have modes for both 5-on-5 and 2-on-2 play.) The Game Boy Color version more traditionally retains the 2-on-2 play.

== Development ==
The game was showcased at E3 1998.

== Reception ==
Reception

Aggregate score
Aggregator	Score	
Aggregator	GBC	N64
GameRankings	58%	75%

Review scores
Publication	Score	
Publication	GBC	N64
AllGame	N/A	2.5/5
Consoles +	N/A	85%
Electronic Gaming Monthly	N/A	5.375/10
Game Informer	7.5/10	7/10
GamePro	N/A	3.5/5
GameSpot	7/10	7.1/10
Hyper	N/A	84%
IGN	3/10	7.9/10
Joypad	N/A	4/10
N64 Magazine	N/A	83%
Nintendo Power	6.2/10	6.6/10
N64 Gamer	N/A	8.5/10

The Nintendo 64 version received "favorable" reviews, while the Game Boy Color version received "mixed" reviews, according to the review aggregation website GameRankings.
