= NBA Jam (1993 video game) =

1993 video game

- Arcade flyer
- Developer: Midway (Note: Home console versions ported by Iguana Entertainment. Both Game Gear, Tournament Edition for PlayStation, and Saturn versions ported by Iguana UK. Game Boy version ported by Beam Software. Tournament Edition for Game Boy ported by Torus Games and Jaguar version by High Voltage Software.)
- Publishers: Midway; Acclaim Entertainment (Note: The North American and PAL versions was released under the Arena Entertainment brand name for the Genesis and Game Gear.) (consoles)
- Designers: Mark Turmell; Shawn Liptak; Jamie Rivett; Sal Divita; John Carlton; Tony Goskie
- Composers: Jon Hey (Arcade); Rick Fox (Genesis/SNES)
- Series: NBA Jam
- Platform: Arcade: Super NES, Sega Genesis, Game Gear, Game Boy, Sega CD, 32X, Sega Saturn, PlayStation, Atari Jaguar
- Release: April 1993: Arcade; NA: April 1993 Game Gear, Genesis, SNES; NA/EU: March 4, 1994 Game Boy; EU: November 24, 1994; NA: November 1994 Sega CD; NA: December 1994; EU: 1994 Tournament Edition Arcade; WW: 1994 Game Gear, Genesis, SNES; NA/EU: February 23, 1995 32X; NA: 1995; EU: June 1995; JP: September 1,1995 PlayStation; NA: September 9, 1995 Saturn; NA: November 10, 1995; EU: December 1995 Jaguar; NA/EU: January 1996
- Genre: Sports
- Modes: Single-player, multiplayer
- Arcade system: Midway T Unit

NBA Jam is a 1993 basketball video game developed and published by Midway for arcades. It is the first entry in the NBA Jam series and the third basketball video game released by Midway, after TV Basketball (1974) and Arch Rivals (1989). The gameplay of NBA Jam is based on Arch Rivals, being primarily based around a 2-on-2 basketball game.

Development on the game came to fruition following the financial failure of Midway's Total Carnage (1992). The aim of the project was to create a game with wide appeal, focusing on mixing digitized graphics with Midway's previous basketball game, Arch Rivals (1989), and Midway securing a license from the National Basketball Association (NBA); The association initially expressed skepticism at Midway's pitch which emphasized arcade gameplay but Midway executives eventually convinced them of its potential. Acclaim acquired the publishing rights to port the game to home consoles.

The game was released in arcades in April 1993, with many releases on consoles in the following years. NBA Jam was a critical and commercial success, and it has been cited by critics to be among the greatest video games of all time. The game totaled 6 million units worldwide across SNES and Sega Genesis as of 2019, while the arcade cabinets shipped over 20,000 units as of 2012, totaling over $2 billion in lifetime revenue. Its release was regarded as being highly influential to the Sports genre. NBA Jam popularized a subgenre of basketball based around fast action and exaggerated realism which developer Midway eventually applied to other Sports in the genre. Several aspects like the implementation of several of its catchphrases also became prevalent in Basketball culture in the years following its release.

== Gameplay ==
The game has an over-the-top style, demonstrated by the player dunking from superhuman heights.

NBA Jam is a two-on-two basketball video game featuring NBA-licensed teams and digitized likenesses of real players. Gameplay is exaggerated instead of realistic: players can jump extremely high and make slam dunks that defy both human capabilities and the laws of physics. There are no fouls, free throws, or violations except goaltending and 24-second violations. This means the player is able to freely shove or elbow opponents out of the way. Additionally, if a player makes three baskets in a row, the character becomes "on fire" and has an unlimited turbo and increased shooting precision. The "on fire" mode continues until the other team scores, or until the player who is "on fire" scores four additional consecutive baskets while "on fire".

The game contains many Easter eggs, special features, and players activated by initials or button/joystick combinations. For example, pressing A five times and right five times on any Genesis controller will activate "Super Clean Floors". This feature causes characters to fall if they run too fast or change direction too quickly. Players can also enter special codes to unlock hidden players, ranging from US President Bill Clinton to Hugo, the Charlotte Hornets mascot. On the arcade machine, there is also a hidden "tank" game that allows the player to drive a tank and shoot enemy tanks for a minute. Just before the court is shown at the start of a game, joysticks 1 and 2 must be moved down and all six of their buttons held down.

== Teams and players ==
The original arcade version of NBA Jam has team rosters from the 1992–93 NBA season and the console versions use rosters from the 1993–94 NBA season. More up-to-date rosters were available in subsequent ports released for the Sega CD, Game Boy, and Game Gear in 1994. Midway did not secure the license to use Michael Jordan's name or likeness (as Jordan himself owns the rights to his name and likeness and not the NBA) and, as such, he was not available as a player for the Chicago Bulls or any other team. Another notable absence from the home versions is Shaquille O'Neal, who was in the arcade version as a member of the Orlando Magic (and who later followed in Jordan's footsteps in buying his name and likeness from the NBA). New Jersey Nets guard Dražen Petrović and Boston Celtics forward Reggie Lewis, both of whom died after the release of the arcade version, were also removed from the home versions.

A limited-edition version of the game with an additional team composed of Gary Payton and Michael Jordan was developed primarily for Jordan and Payton's personal use.

During development, Godzilla and Bart Simpson were planned to be secret characters, but were ultimately scrapped.

== Development ==
The game was devised after Midway's previous arcade release Total Carnage failed to meet sales expectations. Lead designer and programmer Mark Turmell wanted to develop a game with a wider appeal and decided to mix the digitized graphics of some of Midway's previous titles to create a title similar to Midway's previous basketball game Arch Rivals. Midway was able to procure a license from the NBA, paying royalties of $100 for each arcade cabinet sold. The NBA initially reacted negatively to the game feeling that an arcade game was wrong for the branding; however, after a second pitch, they eventually became convinced of its potential. In one of Midway's original pitch videos to the NBA, they stated that they planned on including various additional features. These included different camera angles, tips from coaches, instant replays and a first-person view on fast breaks. None of these features were included in the final game. The graphics for the NBA players were created from digitized video footage of several amateur basketball players, including future NBA player Stephen Howard. These players were available as secret characters in certain versions of the game. Turmell recounted, "My big ideas in NBA Jam were to do the spectacular dunks and two-on-two basketball, but the whole game was very much a team effort. For instance, someone else came up with the idea of attributes, giving different players different abilities."

In 2008, Turmell confirmed a long-held suspicion that the game had a bias against the Chicago Bulls. According to Turmell, a Detroit Pistons fan, the game was programmed such that the Bulls would miss last-second shots in close games against the Pistons.

Iguana Entertainment handled the conversion of the game to home consoles. According to Iguana president Jeff Spangenberg, including the time spent on learning the then-new PlayStation hardware, the PlayStation version took six months to develop. The Sega Saturn version took longer to develop, in part because of the greater complexity of the hardware, but also because Iguana Entertainment did not have access to the Sega Graphics Library operating system (which was used to facilitate the Saturn versions of Virtua Fighter 2 and Virtua Cop, among other games). The Game Gear and PlayStation ports were programmed by Iguana UK employee Chris Kirby, with the Sega Saturn version coded by Darren Tunnicliff. Steve Snake, who would later create the Genesis emulator Kega Fusion, made the 32X version.

The game was written entirely in assembly language. The game had a marketing budget of $10 million.

=== Tournament Edition ===
An update named NBA Jam Tournament Edition (commonly referred to as NBA Jam T.E.) was released in arcades. NBA Jam T.E. included updated rosters, new features and Easter eggs combined with the same gameplay of the original. Jon Hey created new music specifically for NBA Jam: T.E. to replace the original NBA Jam music. Teams now consisted of three players (though only two could be on the court at any time; in practice, the extra player meant greater variety in lineups), with the exception of the new "Rookies" team, which consists of five players, all picked in the 1994 NBA draft. Players could be substituted into the game between quarters. The game also featured new hidden teams and secret playable characters. Early versions of the game included characters from Midway Games's Mortal Kombat games. Players were also assigned more attributes, including clutch and fatigue levels. In addition, the game also introduced features such as a "Tournament" mode that turned off computer assistance and on-court hot spots that allowed for additional points or special slam dunks.

The test version of NBA Jam Tournament Edition included eight hidden characters which were taken out of the final version at the request of the NBA: Elviscious, Grim Reaper, Kongo, Raiden, Reptile, Scorpion, Sub-Zero and Tim Coman. Midway also stated they would update all test version cabinets to remove these characters.

In addition to the arcade version, NBA Jam Tournament Edition was ported to the Super NES, Genesis, 32X, Game Boy, Game Gear, Sega Saturn, PlayStation, and Atari Jaguar, with the PlayStation port serving as a North American launch title.

After Acclaim produced 250,000 Genesis cartridges, the developer learned that the flash memory used for savegames only works if games are played in a specific order. After attempts to repair the cartridges failed, Acclaim included a flyer advising customers of "AutoStat" functionality that requires playing two games using initials "XXX" and "NBA" to initialize the cartridge, turning the flaw into an undocumented feature.

In Germany, Acclaim Entertainment partnered with Sega Magazin for a promotional competition in May 1995. The grand prize was an original four-player NBA Jam Tournament Edition arcade cabinet, while other prizes included home console versions of the game, NBA merchandise and basketball equipment. Readers entered by answering a question about the 1994 NBA Finals, with entries closing on 9 May 1995.

=== Ports ===
The NBA Jam games were ported to many home video game consoles and PC, published by Acclaim. The console versions were well known for featuring many new secret characters; the home versions of Jam T.E. even allowed the player to use then-President Bill Clinton, First Lady Hillary Clinton, Vice President Al Gore, and, on the Atari Jaguar version, Atari's Vice President of Software Development Leonard Tramiel.

In 2020, as part of their Arcade 1Up line, Tastemakers LLC released a three-fourths-scale replica of the original NBA Jam cabinet featuring emulated versions of the original arcade game, along with Tournament Edition and Hangtime, with newly added online play.

== Reception ==
Reception

Review scores
Publication	Score
AllGame	4.5/5 (ARC); 3.5/5 (Sega CD)
Electronic Gaming Monthly	9 / 10 (SNES); 7.6 / 10 (GEN); 6.75 / 10 (GG); 8.25 / 10 (32X); 8.25 / 10 (PS1); 6.25 / 10 (JAG)
Next Generation	3/5 (Sega CD)
Maximum	3/5 (SAT)
Mega	91%

Award
Publication	Award
Mega	7th best game of all time

The game became exceptionally popular and generated a significant amount of money for arcades after its release. In the United States, it topped the monthly RePlay charts for upright arcade cabinets from April 1993 through summer to October 1993. RePlay listed it as America's top-grossing arcade game of Summer 1993. The game's US revenue in 1993 exceeded the $300,000,000 (equivalent to $670,000,000 in 2025) domestic box office gross of the film Jurassic Park the same year. NBA Jam was America's highest-grossing arcade game of 1993. Individual machines at the time were earning up to $2400 per week, setting the all-time record for the highest per-unit arcade earnings in the United States. In Japan, Game Machine listed NBA Jam on their August 15, 1993 issue as the fourth most successful upright arcade unit of the month. The game grossed over $1,000,000,000 (equivalent to $2,200,000,000 in 2025) worldwide in its first twelve months. As of 2012, the arcade game has sold more than 20,000 arcade units and generated a lifetime revenue of $2 billion.

On consoles in the United States it was the top-selling Sega Genesis, Super NES and Game Gear game in March 1994, holding the top-spot on Sega systems for April as well. It was the second best-selling home video game of 1994 in the United States (below Donkey Kong Country), with the Genesis version outselling the Super NES version. The console ports sold 2 million copies in 1994, more than 3 million cartridges worldwide by February 1995, and over 4 million within a year. In the United Kingdom, NBA Jam topped HMV's all-formats home video game sales chart in March 1994 across its Mega Drive, Super Nintendo and Game Gear versions. As of 2019, the Genesis and Super NES versions sold a combined 6 million copies worldwide.

=== Critical response ===
The four reviewers of Electronic Gaming Monthly gave the Super NES version a unanimous score of 9 out of 10 and their "Game of the Month" award. They praised its graphics, sounds, and the four-player mode, and remarked that the gameplay is easy to pick up and incredibly fun even for people who don't like sports games. Reviewing the Genesis version, Mike Weigand commented that "The voices are fuzzy and the colors are a bit bland", but that the game is still very fun. EGM rated the Game Gear version as weaker than either the SNES or Genesis versions, chiefly due to the removal of most of the jams, but said it is still worthwhile for Game Gear owners.

GamePro praised the Sega CD version's updated roster, more intuitive controls, and improved audio with "more voice samples, more music, and more sound effects than any other home version." However, they criticized the graphics as much worse than in the Super NES and arcade versions, complained of long load times, and concluded that the improvements were not enough to make the game worthwhile for those who already had a home version of NBA Jam.

GamePro commented of the Game Boy version, "Obviously the GB is far too limited a system to capture more than a fraction of what made NBA Jam an arcade smash, but at least it has that fraction."

Next Generation reviewed the Sega CD version of the game and stated that "It's good, but it could have been so much more."

In 1995, Flux rated the arcade version 19th in their "Top 100 Video Games." In 1996, Next Generation listed NBA Jam at number 99 in their "Top 100 Games of All Time", commenting that "Despite it having been flogged to death by Acclaim at home and now in the arcades, NBA Jam is still a terrific game, especially in the arcade with four players." In 2017, Gamesradar ranked NBA Jam 23rd on its "Best Sega Genesis/Mega Drive games of all time." IGN listed the NBA Jam 36th on its "Top 100 SNES Games." They praised the game saying: "Professional basketball has never been as much fun as in NBA Jam". They also praised the secret playable characters.

=== Tournament Edition ===
Reception

Review scores
Publication	Score
AllGame	3.5/5 (PS1); 3.5/5 (GEN)
Famitsu	25 / 40 (T.E.) (SNES); 25 / 40 (T.E.) (GEN); 22 / 40 (T.E.) (GG)
Next Generation	3/5 (T.E.) (GEN, 32X); 4/5 (PS1)
CD Player	8/10 (PS1)

Reviewing the 32X version, GamePro opined that people who already own the Genesis version should not bother with the 32X one, but summarized that "Despite some sloppy rough edges, Jam's classic run-n-gun gameplay brings much-needed excitement to the cart-starved 32X." The two sports reviewers of Electronic Gaming Monthly said the 32X version was the most accurate conversion of the arcade game to date. Next Generation reviewed the 32X version of NBA Jam Tournament Edition, rating it three stars out of five, and stated that "NBA Jam T.E. is a good game, but it is just as good on the Genesis and SNES, and shows no signs of 32-bit gaming. While there have been some decent games for the 32X, this is yet one more of the many disappointments."

A reviewer for Next Generation, after enumerating the improvements Tournament Edition offers over the original game, concluded, "What does all this equal? Same game (albeit a good one), new package! Only Jam fanatics and the two guys who don't own the original need slam down the cash for this rehash."

A GamePro critic covered the Tournament Edition release and was less forgiving of the Game Boy version's technical flaws, complaining of sprites with too little detail to discern which player is which during play, and summarizing the conversion as "a pale imitation of an otherwise great game."

Electronic Gaming Monthly's two sports reviewers highly praised the PlayStation version as a precise conversion with good enhancements. Next Generation concurred and declared it the best version of the game to date. Videohead of GamePro disagreed, saying the PlayStation version conspicuously lacks graphical details and voice clips from the arcade version and suffers from overly tough A.I.

Steve Merrett of Sega Saturn Magazine gave the Saturn version an 89%, declaring it "A perfect conversion of one of the most original coin-ops around." He particularly praised the reliance on timing and precision over complex button combinations, and the game's high playability in general, saying it "ensures a return for late-night rematches whilst the graphically-stunning games are gradually coated in dust." Both Sega Saturn Magazine and Maximum were impressed with the Saturn version's retention of all the considerable content of the arcade version. However, the reviewer for Maximum added that it nonetheless failed to offer any game-changing features that would make buying it worthwhile to anyone who already owned the Genesis or Super NES version.

GamePro commented that the Jaguar version is competent but far inferior to the PlayStation version. The two sports reviewers of Electronic Gaming Monthly were slightly more pleased with the conversion but felt it pointless since there had already been so many versions of the game, and the Jaguar release fails to offer anything new.

Entertainment Weekly gave NBA Jam Tournament Edition an A and wrote that "The latest upgrade, NBA Jam Tournament Edition, of the two-on-two in-your-face hoopfest boasts the participation of fully one third of the NBA's roster. And the graphics and sound are astounding-not only is playing this game like watching TV, but so is listening to it, with unnervingly accurate commentary that precisely follows the action of the game. Loads of hidden tricks and guest appearances make this one an arcade slam dunk."

In 1995, Total! ranked the game 8th in its "Top 100 SNES Games". In 1998, Saturn Power listed the Sega Saturn version 89th in their "Top 100 Sega Saturn Games." In 2018, Complex named NBA Jam Tournament Edition 44th on their "The Best Super Nintendo Games of All Time."

== Legacy ==
=== Sequels ===
Acclaim later ended up winning the exclusive rights to use the NBA Jam name and, without Midway's involvement, released a sequel, NBA Jam Extreme, in 1996. It features 3D graphics and Marv Albert doing commentary. The game received mixed reception. Acclaim continued to use the NBA Jam name on subsequent console games until the company closed in 2004, although the games were only mildly popular.

Midway released their own sequel in arcades in 1996, NBA Hangtime, which was better received. Hangtime featured refined 2D gameplay and added a create-a-player option among other new features. An update called NBA Maximum Hangtime was subsequently released for the arcade, and the game was ported to home systems. Midway later produced further entries in its NBA series with 3-D graphics, beginning with NBA Showtime: NBA on NBC in 1999, followed by the console-exclusive NBA Hoopz in 2001, which expanded the gameplay to 3-on-3, and the NBA Ballers series.

EA Sports, having acquired rights to the name, released a new version of NBA Jam, with the Wii version released on October 5, 2010, and PlayStation 3 and Xbox 360 versions released the following month. Original NBA Jam creator Mark Turmell was hired to work on this new version in conjunction with EA Canada. Following the game's critical and commercial success, a follow-up, NBA Jam: On Fire Edition was released for PSN on October 4, 2011, and XBLA on October 5, 2011.

In 2024, Raw Thrills, which was founded by former Midway employees, released the arcade game NBA Superstars, the first NBA arcade game since NBA Showtime, which includes many gameplay elements from the Midway series, and features NBA Jam announcer Tim Kitzrow.

=== Other Midway sports series ===
Midway also applied similar themes and designs to their other sports games, beginning with the 1996 hockey game NHL Open Ice and the American football game NFL Blitz, which proved to be a major success. Midway had also developed Power Up Baseball around 1996 based on the same concepts as NBA Jam, but it was cancelled as they found the game did not test well due to the large number of paid plays users would need to complete one game, among other issues.

After making the switch to develop console games exclusively, Midway continued to produce sports titles with arcade-style gameplay, with sequels to NFL Blitz, a new hockey series called NHL Hitz, the MLB Slugfest series of baseball games, and the soccer game RedCard 2003.

=== Popular culture ===
In popular sports culture, the phrases "He's heating up", "He's on fire", and "Boomshakalaka!" are identified with NBA Jam. In the game, these catch-phrases describe when a player hits two or three shots in a row. When a player is "on fire", the ball literally catches fire and singes the net. Voiced by Tim Kitzrow, the announcer is reminiscent of Marv Albert and has contributed numerous memorable lines to the basketball lexicon. The NBA Jam script was written solely by Jon Hey, although Kitzrow has stated that the lines were largely improvised.

NBA Jam also incorporates a slogan from Spike Lee's alter-ego in his 1986 film She's Gotta Have It, Mars Blackmon, who was also featured in a Nike basketball shoe television commercial at the time. The NBA Jam commentator asks, "Is it the shoes?" after a player performs spectacularly. The 2010 game features a nod to this particular piece of commentary, when the commentator (Kitzrow reprising the role) sometimes exclaims "It's gotta be the shoes!" under similar circumstances.

The upbeat, funky music written by Jon Hey was inspired by sports music themes and has been compared to George Clinton's P-Funk All Stars. Funkadelic's 1979 "(Not Just) Knee Deep" shares the most similarity with the music of NBA Jam but was recorded more than a decade before NBA Jam's music was written. The likeness of George Clinton was used as the character "P. Funk" in the console versions of NBA Jam Tournament Edition. The original NBA Jam arcade release and the NBA Jam T.E. arcade release had different music for the title screen and for each quarter.

In July 2009, Mortal Kombat creator Ed Boon revealed (on Twitter) that a Mortal Kombat court was to be hidden in a console port of NBA Jam or NBA Hangtime.

In October 2019, writer Reyan Ali published a book on the game/series for Boss Fight Books called NBA Jam documenting the game's development, success and impact on Midway afterward.

== See also ==
- Double Dribble (1986 video game)
- Arch Rivals (1989)
