= NBA Jam =

- Genre: Sports
- Developers: Midway; Acclaim Entertainment; Electronic Arts
- Publishers: Midway; Acclaim Entertainment; Electronic Arts
- Platforms: Arcade, Super Nintendo Entertainment System, Sega Genesis, Game Boy, Game Gear, Sega CD, Sega Saturn, 32X, PlayStation, Atari Jaguar, Windows, Nintendo 64, Game Boy Color, Game Boy Advance, PlayStation 2, Xbox, Wii, PlayStation 3, Xbox 360, iOS, Android
- First release: NBA Jam; April 1993
- Latest release: NBA Jam: On Fire Edition; October 4, 2011

NBA Jam is a basketball video game series based on the National Basketball Association (NBA). Initially developed as arcade games by Midway, the game found popularity with its photorealistic digitized graphics, over-the-top presentation and exaggerated style of two-on-two basketball play. The successor to Midway's Arch Rivals, the original 1993 NBA Jam allows players to jump many times above their own height, make slam dunks that defy human capabilities, and freely shove or elbow opponents out of the way without consequences. It also featured a variety of secret characters, as well as the ability to track player records and statistics between play sessions.

After the release of NBA Jam Tournament Edition, Acclaim, the publishers of the home versions of the NBA Jam games acquired exclusive rights to release games under the NBA Jam name under their Acclaim Sports brand. They produced their own games with the NBA Jam name starting in 1996 with NBA Jam Extreme, an arcade game featuring the trademark over-the-top style of the previous games. Meanwhile, Midway continued its own series of NBA games with NBA Hangtime. After NBA Jam Extreme, Acclaim started publishing titles exclusive to home consoles with a more realistic style. Acclaim then attempted to return the series to its arcade roots with one more console game, 2003's NBA Jam, before the company closed in 2004.

6 years later, Electronic Arts acquired the rights to the name and in 2010 released NBA Jam for the Wii, PlayStation 3 and Xbox 360. The game was an attempt to replicate the original Midway games on newer consoles and original lead designer/programmer Mark Turmell was consulted on its development.

== Installments ==
Midway NBA series

Title	Year	Platform(s)	Publisher	Innovation/New features
NBA Jam	1993	Arcade, Super NES, Sega Genesis, Game Boy, Game Gear, Sega CD	Midway	2-on-2 basketball, one of the first sports games to feature NBA-licensed teams and players. Tim Kitzrow in-game announcer.
NBA Jam Tournament Edition	1994	Arcade, Super NES, Sega Genesis, Game Boy, Game Gear, Sega Saturn, 32X, PlayStation, Atari Jaguar	Midway	"Tournament" mode, more player attributes, player substitutions. Tim Kitzrow in-game announcer.
NBA Hangtime	1996	Arcade, PlayStation, Super NES, Nintendo 64, Sega Genesis	Midway	The gameplay is largely the same as the prior two Midway's NBA Jam games, with some additions. Has create-a-player feature. The title was changed due to the NBA Jam name being acquired by Acclaim Entertainment. An arcade mod kit called NBA Maximum Hangtime featured updated rosters. Neil Funk in-game announcer.
NBA Showtime: NBA on NBC	1999	Arcade, Dreamcast, Nintendo 64, PlayStation, Game Boy Color	Midway	Last of the Midway 2-on-2 play NBA games and the last to be released for arcades. Tim Kitzrow in-game announcer
NBA Hoopz	2001	PlayStation, PlayStation 2, Dreamcast, Game Boy Color	Midway	Features 3 vs 3 play. Tim Kitzrow in-game announcer

Non-Midway NBA Jam series

Title	Year	Platform(s)	Publisher	Innovation/New features
NBA Jam Extreme	1996	Arcade, PlayStation, Sega Saturn, Windows	Acclaim	Features 3D graphics. Marv Albert in-game announcer.
NBA Jam 99	1998	Nintendo 64, Game Boy Color	Acclaim	5-on-5 basketball. Dan Roberts in-game announcer.
NBA Jam 2000	1999	Nintendo 64	Acclaim	"Simulation" mode, "Jam" mode, improved create-a-player and create-a-team. Kevin Harlan in-game announcer.
NBA Jam 2001	2000	Game Boy Color	Acclaim	None
NBA Jam 2002	2002	Game Boy Advance	Acclaim	None
NBA Jam	2003	PlayStation 2, Xbox	Acclaim	3-on-3 gameplay. Legendary all-star teams (1950s, 1960s, 1970s, 1980s, and 1990s). Tim Kitzrow in-game announcer.
NBA Jam	2010	Wii, PlayStation 3, Xbox 360, iOS, Android, Windows Phone, Mac OS	EA Sports	New modes (Campaign, 1-on-1 boss battles, Elimination, 21, and Domination), High-resolution photographs for heads of players. Tim Kitzrow in-game announcer.
NBA Jam: On Fire Edition	2011	PlayStation 3, Xbox 360	EA Sports	New AI, improved visuals, roster updates. Tim Kitzrow in-game announcer.

== Reception ==
In 1996, Next Generation listed the NBA Jam series as number 99 on its "Top 100 Games of All Time", commenting that, "NBA Jam is still a terrific game, especially in the arcade with four players. Many of its innovations are now cliche, but it remains one of the best arcade machines around."
