= NBA Jam 2002 =

2002 video game

- Developer: DC Studios
- Publisher: Acclaim Entertainment (Note: Released under the Acclaim Sports label)
- Composer: Manfred Linzner
- Series: NBA Jam
- Platform: Game Boy Advance
- Release: NA: February 21, 2002; EU: March 1, 2002
- Genre: Sports
- Modes: Single-player, multiplayer

NBA Jam 2002 is a sports Game Boy Advance game made by Acclaim Entertainment as a licensed basketball simulation for the 2002-2003 NBA season. It was the follow-up to NBA Jam 2001 and was the last game in the NBA Jam series to mention a year in its title. The game was originally set for release in late November 2001 before being delayed to February 2002.

There were 29 NBA teams to play as with more than 140 players in all.

== Reception ==
Reception

Aggregate score
Aggregator	Score
Metacritic	49/100

Review scores
Publication	Score
AllGame	1/5
Game Informer	1.25/10
GameSpot	7/10
GameSpy	35%
GameZone	7.7/10
IGN	2/10
Nintendo Power	3.3/5

The game received "generally unfavorable reviews" according to the review aggregation website Metacritic.
