= NBA Jam (2003 video game) =

- Developer: Acclaim Studios Austin
- Publisher: Acclaim Entertainment
- Producer: Brandon Fish
- Designer: Vu Thai Dang
- Programmer: John Yuill
- Artist: Michael Taylor
- Composers: Mike Tekulve; Nelson Everhart
- Series: NBA Jam
- Platforms: PlayStation 2, Xbox
- Release: NA: September 23, 2003; EU: November 7, 2003
- Genre: Sports
- Modes: Single-player, multiplayer

NBA Jam is a 3-on-3 basketball video game published by Acclaim Entertainment for the PlayStation 2 and Xbox in 2003. It is part of the NBA Jam series. The game was announced on May 12, 2003. The play-by-play is voiced by Tim Kitzrow. There was also originally to be a GameCube version of the game.

The game is based on the 2003–04 NBA season and features some of the NBA's best players from that season. After a series of more simulation-oriented Jam games, NBA Jam features fast-paced gameplay more akin to the arcade originals, although in a departure from the series' usual 2-on-2 formula, the teams are made up of three players instead. The game also features various courts and special teams, including all-star teams composed of various NBA legends. It is the last NBA Jam released by Acclaim, as the company became defunct the following year.

NBA Jam would also be the last Jam game released until Electronic Arts revived the franchise with its 2010 NBA Jam game.

== Music ==
The music in NBA Jam ranges from before 1970 to 2000. Including multiple artists such as Chuck Berry, King Floyd, and SubUrban. SubUrban makes the most appearances on the soundtrack with six songs. Followed up by F.O.S and Bootsy Collins with two songs each. Since the game was released in the early 2000s most of the songs are from that era but the variety included in the soundtrack helps accommodate a larger audience. The developers purposely included lots of rock and hip-hop into the soundtrack; in the '60s and '70s rock was widely listened to by the younger generation, and in the same respect the '90s introduced the boom of rap music. With such a diverse soundtrack NBA Jam was intended to appeal to a broad audience.

== Reception ==
Reception

Aggregate score
Aggregator	Score	
Aggregator	PS2	Xbox
Metacritic	67/100	68/100

Review scores
Publication	Score	
Publication	PS2	Xbox
Electronic Gaming Monthly	6/10	6/10
Game Informer	6.5/10	6.5/10
GamePro	4/5	4/5
GameSpot	7.7/10	7.7/10
GameSpy	3/5	3/5
IGN	7/10	7/10
Jeuxvideo.com	11/20	11/20
Official U.S. PlayStation Magazine	2.5/5	N/A
Official Xbox Magazine (US)	N/A	6.1/10
X-Play	N/A	2/5

The game received "average" reviews on both platforms according to the review aggregation website Metacritic.
