= Fear Factor: Unleashed =

2004 video game

- Developer: DC Studios
- Publisher: Hip Interactive
- Platform: Game Boy Advance
- Release: NA: November 17, 2004
- Genre: Action video game
- Mode: Single-player

Fear Factor: Unleashed is a Game Boy Advance game that is based on the reality series Fear Factor. Ports for PlayStation 2 and Xbox were planned in the next year but later cancelled.

== Details ==
The player is able to choose if they want their character to be a man or woman and what skin color they want the character to have. The character has four statistics which are nerve, steadiness, stomach, and stamina. The video game has 12 mini-games which are the gross-out stunts, the skill-type stunts, and the action stunts.

== Reception ==
Reception

Aggregate score
Aggregator	Score
Metacritic	30/100

Review scores
Publication	Score
Game Informer	3/10
GameZone	3.9/10
Nintendo Power	2/5
Nintendo World Report	2/10

The game received "generally unfavorable reviews" according to video game review aggregator Metacritic.

David Beaudoin of 1UP.com said that the game's biggest flaw is that only fans will truly appreciate the title, and gave the game a D−. Ricky Tucker of Game Vortex said that the mini-games are fun especially on the Game Boy Advance. Chris Faylor of Gaming-Age said that he only recommends the game to die-hard fans of the show.
