= Barkley Shut Up and Jam 2 =

1995 video game

- Developer: Accolade
- Publisher: Sport Accolade
- Platform: Sega Genesis
- Release: NA: April 1995
- Genre: Sports (basketball)
- Modes: Single-player, multiplayer

Barkley Shut Up and Jam 2 is a 1995 basketball video game developed and published by Accolade for the Sega Genesis. The game is a sequel to 1994's Barkley Shut Up and Jam!

Piko Interactive acquired the rights to the game and re-released it in a compilation cartridge for the Evercade handheld under the name Hoops Shut Up and Jam 2 in 2021.

== Gameplay ==
One of the players is about to unleash a "chaotic dunk" on the backboard.

The game is played from a horizontal perspective as the player and its teammate (computer or human) try to outscore the competition using any means necessary.

Players can choose from ten "streetwise" players, not including Charles Barkley himself, as they play in either an exhibition game or tournament. Since this is basketball on the street, players compete in eight different urban environments featuring graffiti, rubble, and even a moving train. More than 2000 player animations have been included to show moves such as behind-the-back passes, double-clutches, alley-oops, and 25 different dunks. Battery backup allows players to save tournament progress, as well as individual records such as triple doubles, total wins, and total losses.

In addition, digitized voice samples of Charles Barkley offer either words of encouragement or ridicule while they play.

== Reception ==
GamePro gave the game a mixed review, saying that the graphics and animations are drastically improved over the original Barkley, the tournament mode is "a worthy challenge for veteran b-ball gamers", and the gameplay is complex, but that "the action stays at relatively the same pace throughout the game" and in single player mode the computer partner AI often fails to cooperate with the player's attempts at teamwork. A reviewer for Next Generation gave it one star out five rating; while noting the game to be "far superior" to the original Barkley, he called it "terrible" in several aspects, and commented that the game did not capture the essence of street basketball well.
