= NBA Jam 2001 =

2000 video game

- Developer: DC Studios
- Publisher: Acclaim Entertainment (Note: Released under the Acclaim Sports label)
- Designer: Mark Greenshields
- Programmer: Brian Beuben
- Composer: Manfred Linzner
- Series: NBA Jam
- Platform: Game Boy Color
- Release: NA: November 28, 2000
- Genre: Sports
- Modes: Single-player, multiplayer

NBA Jam 2001 is a sports Game Boy Color game made by Acclaim Entertainment as licensed basketball simulation for the 2001-2002 NBA season. It was the follow-up to NBA Jam 2000. It featured Karl Malone, Jason Williams, Reggie Miller, Jason Kidd, Latrell Sprewell, and Scottie Pippen on the cover.

== Reception ==
Reception

Aggregate score
Aggregator	Score
GameRankings	43%

Review scores
Publication	Score
IGN	3/10
Nintendo Power	5.9/10

The game received "unfavorable" reviews according to the review aggregation website GameRankings.
