= H.E.D.Z. =

1998 video game

H.E.D.Z. (Head Extreme Destruction Zone)
- Developer: VIS Interactive
- Publisher: Hasbro Interactive
- Platform: Microsoft Windows
- Release: NA: October 15, 1998
- Genre: Action
- Mode: Single player

H.E.D.Z. (the abbreviation of Head Extreme Destruction Zone) is a 1998 action game, developed by VIS Interactive, and published by Hasbro Interactive for Windows. The game focuses on players assuming the role of an alien combatant who rely on specialized masks - made from the heads of humans from Earth that - which posses different power and abilities in order to defeat opponents across a wide variety of combat-focused levels. The game received mixed reviews upon release.

== Gameplay ==
In H.E.D.Z., players control a member of an alien species whose goal is to defeat other members of their kind in specialized gladitorial-styled combat arenas. To achieve this, the player must make use of a handful of masks called "Heads" - which parody various human cultures, time periods and occupations - each of which has their own power and abilities, in order to defeat their opponents by de-masking them until they have no Heads left to use; likewise, the player loses if they run out of useable Heads. The game features single-player and multi-player modes, with each match in either mode allowing the player to make use of up to five different Heads.

Each Head carries a different power and ability - while most provide different weapon types from guns, explosives and area attacks, other confer special abilities such as absorbing damage, or having quicker movement speed. The game's levels and arenas each focus on different themes based on human environments, each with their own hazards and obstacles.

In single-player mode, players begin with a few Heads but can acquire more during the game, while earning money either from defeating opponents or acquiring additional masks they already own, which can be used to pay for healing. Alongside the main objective of defeating all opponents in a level, some feature special areas that can be accessed via fulfilling a certain condition, whilst others require players to complete them within a time limit.

== Premise ==
Members of an alien race - who live in the worlds within the asteroid belt called the Nappa Flux - decide to set up a tournament called Head Extreme Destruction Zone (H.E.D.Z. for short) as a form of entertainment for their kind, developing a technology that can allow a user to gain powers through a specialized mask system known as a Head. In order to source these powers, the aliens go to Earth to abduct humans and certain animal species from across human history, ranging from Medieval times, to modern day Texas. Once abducted, the aliens bring their captives back to the Nappa Flux, where their scientists extract the head of their subjects, before offering them to participating aliens taking part in H.E.D.Z., with the goal being for a combatant to defeat their opponents, while not losing their Head, in order to win.

== Development ==
The game was announced in June 1997.

== Reception ==
Reception

Aggregate score
Aggregator	Score
GameRankings	50%

Review scores
Publication	Score
Computer Gaming World	1.5/5
Computer and Video Games	1/10
GameRevolution	D+
GameSpot	5.2/10
IGN	6.5/10
PC Gamer (UK)	45%
PC Gamer (US)	24%
PC Zone	85%

The game received "mixed" reviews according to the review aggregation website GameRankings.
