= NBA Jam 2000 =

1999 video game

- European Nintendo 64 cover art
- Developer: Acclaim Studios Salt Lake City
- Publisher: Acclaim Entertainment (Note: Released under the Acclaim Sports label)
- Series: NBA Jam
- Platform: Nintendo 64
- Release: NA: November 30, 1999; EU: January 21, 2000
- Genre: Sports
- Modes: Single-player, multiplayer

NBA Jam 2000 is a sports Nintendo 64 game developed by Acclaim Studios Salt Lake City as licensed basketball simulation for the 1999–2000 NBA season. It also contained elements of the classic NBA Jam series in Jam Mode. The rosters were accurate as of October 16, 1999. All photos and video used are from the 1998–1999 NBA season. It was announced on June 16, 1999. The cover features former Sacramento Kings power forward Chris Webber. The game also features Kevin Harlan on play-by-play with Marv Albert as the studio host. The Utah Jazz' Dan Roberts provides the arena announcing.

== Reception ==
Reception

Aggregate score
Aggregator	Score
GameRankings	66%

Review scores
Publication	Score
AllGame	3/5
Electronic Gaming Monthly	5/10
Game Informer	6/10
GameFan	36%
GamePro	3/5
GameSpot	5.6/10
IGN	7.1/10
Nintendo Power	7.1/10

The game received "average" reviews according to the review aggregation website GameRankings.

== See also ==
- List of NBA video games
