= DC Studios (video game developer) =

British video game developer

- Logo introduced in 2004
- Company type: Private
- Industry: Video games
- Founded: 3 December 1999; 25 years ago in Glasgow, Scotland
- Founder: Mark Greenshields
- Defunct: 25 September 2007
- Fate: Dissolved
- Successor: Firebrand Games
- Headquarters: Montreal, Canada
- Key people: Mark Greenshields (CEO)
- Number of employees: 55 (2006)

DC Studios was a video game developer based in Montreal, Canada. Founded by Mark Greenshields in December 1999, it was originally located in Glasgow, and later expanded to Montreal, Edinburgh, and Dublin. Following the underperformance of State of Emergency 2, which the company had acquired from VIS Entertainment, DC Studios closed its Scotland operations in June 2006. The remaining Montreal office was closed in September 2007. Both offices were replaced by ones for Greenshields' newer venture, Firebrand Games.

== History ==
DC Studios was founded on 3 December 1999. Mark Greenshields set it up in Glasgow, after leaving Steel Monkeys, another Scotland-based development studio, earlier that year. In November 2000, the company expanded with a second outfit located in Montreal. In August 2003, Andrew McLennan left his position as commercial director from Steel Monkeys, at the time run by his brother Derek as managing director, to join DC Studio as business development director. In April 2005, backed by the Irish government, DC Studios opened a development studio in Dublin, seeking to employ 50 further staff.

In May 2005, the company acquired the rights to State of Emergency 2 from the defunct developer VIS Entertainment. Following its release, however, the game severely underperformed in sales, due to which DC Studios announced on 4 June 2006 that it had ceased all operations in the United Kingdom, laying off all 29 staff from its Edinburgh office. The Montreal office remained open, at the time with 55 employees. It was eventually shut down in favour of opening a Florida office for Greenshields' newer venture, Firebrand Games, on 25 September 2007.

== Games developed ==
Year	Title	Platform(s)	Publisher(s)
1999	Mia Hamm Soccer 64	Nintendo 64	SouthPeak Games
2000	NBA Jam 2001	Game Boy Color	Acclaim Sports
2001	Activision TV Game	Dedicated console	Toymax
2001	Army Men Advance	Game Boy Advance	The 3DO Company
2002	Salt Lake 2002	Game Boy Advance	Ubi Soft
2002	NBA Jam 2002	Game Boy Advance	Acclaim Sports
2002	Bratz	Game Boy Advance, Microsoft Windows, PlayStation	Ubi Soft
2002	Atari TV Game	Dedicated console	Jakks Pacific
2002	Taxi 2	PlayStation	Ubi Soft
2002	Jim Henson's Bear in the Big Blue House	PlayStation	Ubi Soft
2003	Le Tour de France: 1903–2003 – Centenary Edition	PlayStation 2	Konami
2003	Charmed	J2ME	In-Fusio
2003	Cartoon Network Speedway	Game Boy Advance	Majeso Sales
2004	XS Moto	Game Boy Advance	XS Games
2004	Fear Factor: Unleashed	Game Boy Advance	Hip Interactive
2004	Kenny vs. Spenny: Versusville	Microsoft Windows	Breakthrough New Media
2004	The Cat in the Hat	PlayStation	NewKidCo
2005	Rayman DS	Nintendo DS	Ubisoft
2005	Disney's Cinderella: Magical Dreams	Game Boy Advance	Disney Interactive
2005	Whac-A-Mole	Game Boy Advance, Nintendo DS	Activision Value
2005	Winx Club	Game Boy Advance, Microsoft Windows, PlayStation 2	Konami Digital Entertainment
2006	State of Emergency 2	PlayStation 2	SouthPeak Games
2006	VeggieTales: LarryBoy and the Bad Apple	Game Boy Advance	Crave Entertainment
2006	Hannah Montana	Game Boy Advance	Buena Vista Games
2006	Disney's Chicken Little: Ace in Action	Nintendo DS	Buena Vista Games
2007	Code Lyoko	Nintendo DS	The Game Factory
2007	Thrillville: Off the Rails	Nintendo DS	LucasArts
