= NBA Elite 11 =

2010 basketball video game

- Box art featuring Kevin Durant
- Developer: EA Canada
- Publisher: EA Sports
- Series: NBA Live
- Platform: iOS
- Release: November 5, 2010
- Genre: Sports
- Modes: Single-player, multiplayer

NBA Elite 11 is a basketball mobile game released by Electronic Arts (EA) for iOS in November 2010. It is the seventeenth installment in EA's NBA Live series and the only to bear the NBA Elite name. It features Kevin Durant of the Oklahoma City Thunder on the cover.

A release of the game for the PlayStation 3 and Xbox 360 was scheduled for October 5, 2010, but both versions were cancelled shortly before release, with some copies escaping into consumer hands. Previously, a download code for NBA Jam was to be included with copies of Xbox 360 and PS3 versions of NBA Elite 11, but NBA Jam was subsequently released as a standalone game for both systems and the Wii.

== Features ==
Controls were retooled to primarily use the right analog stick for actions such as shooting. These actions added difficulty for simple moves like layups while reducing difficulty for three-point shots. Dribbling and shooting controls were also modified, and new animations were created for certain actions.

NBA Live 10 commentators Marv Albert and Steve Kerr were replaced by the ESPN crew of Mark Jackson, Jeff Van Gundy, and Mike Breen.

The game was to feature the debut of "Become Legendary Mode", a single-player career mode similar to "Be a Pro Mode" in NHL and FIFA and "Superstar Mode" in the Madden games.

The iOS version features a 3-point shootout mode, season mode, playoff mode, and play mode.

The game's soundtrack was produced by 9th Wonder and rapper J. Cole and was going to include the song "The Plan."

== Cancelled Xbox 360 and PlayStation 3 versions ==
Developers of the Xbox 360 and PlayStation 3 versions aimed to completely change the game's control system but were pressed for time with an 18-month development cycle. A demo released during development was plagued with glitches that were heavily publicized, including one YouTube video of player Andrew Bynum stuck in the middle of the court in the model's T-pose. Another glitch involved Luol Deng, whose character had a "hotspot" from the left baseline from which he almost never missed. Developers were aware of an animation bug but intended to fix it before release. After internal review of the game, EA deemed its quality poor and cancelled it.

Copies of these versions that entered circulation are considered rare collector's items.

== See also ==
- NBA 2K11
- NBA Jam
