= Barkley 2 =

Cancelled video game

- Developer: Tales of Game's Studios
- Publisher: Tales of Game's Studios
- Engine: GameMaker: Studio
- Platforms: Microsoft Windows, macOS, Linux
- Release: Cancelled
- Genres: Action; Role-playing

The Magical Realms of Tír na nÓg: Escape from Necron 7 – Revenge of Cuchulainn: The Official Game of the Movie – Chapter 2 of the Hoopz Barkley SaGa, simply called Barkley 2: Revenge of Cuchulainn or just Barkley 2, was a role-playing video game developed by Tales of Game's Studios. The game was intended to be a sequel to Barkley, Shut Up and Jam: Gaiden, a 2008 freeware title which itself was a fan game sequel to the basketball game Barkley Shut Up and Jam! and the film Space Jam.

The developers launched a Kickstarter campaign to crowdfund the game in November 2012, with an intended release in early 2014. Although the campaign was successful, the project eventually entered development hell, and by June 2019 it was revealed that most of the developers had left the project. In June 2021, the game was officially cancelled.

== Gameplay ==
Barkley 2 was intended to be an action role-playing game that Rock, Paper, Shotgun's Nathan Grayson described would "marry the aesthetics and absurd narrative arcs of Japanese role-players" with the openness of Western games like The Elder Scrolls. Players would have controlled the amnesic cyborg X114JAM9 in his search for the character of Cyberdwarf from the previous game. The game was designed to change the events in the storyline based on when a player completes certain content: in-game characters, places, and quests were to vary depending on the player's actions. The combat in the game was inspired by a range of other titles, including Dark Souls and Borderlands. At a certain point in the game, X114JAM9's true identity was to be revealed and the player would have the choice to either reject said identity or reclaim it.

== Development ==
Barkley 2 was a sequel to Tales of Game's Studios' 2008 freeware title Barkley, Shut Up and Jam: Gaiden, which itself was created as a fan game sequel to the 1994 basketball game Barkley Shut Up and Jam! and the film Space Jam. The game included players from the National Basketball Association (NBA), including Charles Barkley and LeBron James, and made many parodic references to popular culture. The game was styled after 16-bit era Japanese titles like the early games in the Final Fantasy series; however while the original Barkley game was turn-based, the sequel was intended to be an action RPG. Barkley 2 was developed using Game Maker, the same creation kit that was used to create the first Barkley game (along with RPG Maker 2003). Unlike the first game, Barkley 2 was intended to be a commercial release and was to avoid the usage of copyrighted material as a result. Tales of Game's Studios launched a Kickstarter campaign on November 28, 2012, to help crowdfund the costs of producing the game. The initial funding goal for the campaign was set at $35,000. The Kickstarter campaign officially ended with a total of $120,335.

Tales of Game's Studios announced on the Kickstarter campaign page that they anticipated a release in late 2013 or early 2014, but in late 2016, a Tales of Game's staff member confirmed in an update to the campaign that their Kickstarter funds had been depleted, suggesting the game had fallen into development hell. In June 2019, a Kickstarter update confirmed that the majority of developers had left the project and that development was moving slowly, with only two people left on the project working on it part-time, neither of them members of the original team that made the first game. A demo was released in August of that year.

On June 11, 2021, the game was officially cancelled, and the source code repository (with assets included) was released to the public under a CC BY-NC 4.0 license.
