= State of Emergency (video game) =

2002 video game

- Developer: VIS Entertainment
- Publishers: Rockstar Games (PlayStation 2, Xbox); Global Star Software (Windows)
- Platforms: PlayStation 2, Xbox, Microsoft Windows
- Release: PlayStation 2: NA: 12 February 2002; EU: 22 February 2002; Xbox: NA: 25 March 2003; EU: 4 April 2003; Microsoft Windows: EU: 1 August 2003; NA: 5 August 2003
- Genre: Beat 'em up
- Modes: Single-player, multiplayer

State of Emergency is a beat 'em up video game developed by VIS Entertainment and published by Rockstar Games for PlayStation 2 and Xbox, and by Global Star Software for Microsoft Windows. The game received mixed reviews from critics.

== Plot ==
Set in a dystopian United States where big business gradually took over national affairs and suspended elections. It wasn't long before the American Trade Organization, most commonly known as "The Corporation", performs a coup and takes control in 2023, establishing a totalitarian corporate regime. Years later, in 2035, an underground movement called "Freedom" sparks a national riot and The Corporation declares a state of emergency in response. The game takes place in Capital City, the player joins Freedom to topple The Corporation; they must play as one of a selection of five characters, each with their own unique backgrounds.

== Characters ==
The player is given a choice of characters to play as, however only two are available from the start. The remaining three must be unlocked.

Roy MacNeil (AKA "Mack") - MacNeil was a cop for fifteen years before he was fired from the force for refusing to open fire on a group of rioters looting a Corporation grocery store. A highly respected and high-ranking officer, MacNeil's dismissal resulted in a city-wide strike of protest by his fellow officers. The Corporation retaliated by replacing the entire force with their own security firm. MacNeil and his fellow officers continued to protest, eventually uncovering evidence that Corporation was funding organized crime outfits to harass non-Corporation businesses. When the ex-officers attempted to air their findings, key members were assassinated, prompting MacNeil to go into hiding. He has since been instrumental in organizing the underground revolutionary group, Freedom.

Anna Price (AKA "Libra") - Anna was an up-and-coming criminal attorney who once believed in the Corporation model of rebuilding America, until she was blackmailed by the security forces to falsify evidence against political prisoners. When Anna refused to railroad her clients and threatened to expose Corporation, she paid a horrible price. A car bomb planted by Corporation thugs killed her husband and daughter, but she survived the blast. Believed to be officially dead, Anna has now hooked up with Freedom seeking revenge on the fascist state.

Hector Soldado (AKA "Spanky") - Spanky remembers the way his neighbourhood used to be. Although the neighborhood was previously impoverished, it is depicted as having deteriorated significantly due to ongoing conflict. Overrun by state-sponsored death squads and gangs, The Corporation has engaged in a prolonged conflict against the residents of Spanky's neighbourhood. Once a hardened gang member, he has now directed his efforts to organizing his community into an armed resistance against the Corporation.

Ricky Thang (AKA "Freak" or "Phreak") - Ricky was orphaned in high school when his parents were arrested as political dissidents and were never seen again. Ricky went into hiding with other runaways before he was recruited by agents of Freedom. As Ricky's father used to run a PC repair shop, he has been using PC's since he was a child, and has become a prolific hacker and phone phreak. He is personally responsible for several attacks against Corporation's infrastructure, which first attracted the Freedom movement to put the hacker to good use.

Edward Raymonds (AKA "The Bull") - The Bull graduated from Mesa High and joined the armed forces before the Corporation takeover. He was discovered by a sports agent while playing for the army's football team, and was recruited to play professionally. The Bull enjoyed a legendary career until the Corporation bought the professional football league. When he refused to participate in Corporation-sponsored match fixing, he was framed for illegal drug-use, and served five years in prison. With his future bleak and reputation destroyed, The Bull was ready to go take out as many of the men responsible as he could. The Bull now uses his experience to train new recruits to Freedom and lead organized attacks against the Corporation.

== Reception ==
Reception

Aggregate score
Aggregator	Score		
Aggregator	PC	PS2	Xbox
Metacritic	65/100	71/100	67/100

Review scores
Publication	Score		
Publication	PC	PS2	Xbox
AllGame	N/A	2.5/5	3/5
Edge	N/A	4/10	N/A
Electronic Gaming Monthly	N/A	6.33/10	6.33/10
Eurogamer	N/A	4/10	N/A
Game Informer	N/A	8/10	7/10
GamePro	N/A	4/5	3.5/5
GameRevolution	N/A	C−	N/A
GameSpot	7.2/10	8.5/10	7.8/10
GameSpy	N/A	70%	2/5
GameZone	6.8/10	8.3/10	8/10
IGN	6.6/10	8.3/10	6.6/10
Official U.S. PlayStation Magazine	N/A	3/5	N/A
Official Xbox Magazine (US)	N/A	N/A	6.5/10
PC Gamer (US)	43%	N/A	N/A
The Cincinnati Enquirer	N/A	4/5	N/A
Entertainment Weekly	N/A	C	N/A

By July 2006, the PlayStation 2 version of State of Emergency had sold 700,000 copies and earned $28 million in the United States. Next Generation ranked it as the 90th highest-selling game launched for the PlayStation 2, Xbox or GameCube between January 2000 and July 2006 in that country. Combined sales of the State of Emergency line reached 900,000 units in the United States by July 2006.

State of Emergency received "mixed or average" reviews on all platforms according to video game review aggregator Metacritic. The game's strengths were considered to be the value for money as a budget title, the simplistic fun offered, the technical achievement of having hundreds of people running around on a modest system, and the satirical sense of humor. Weaknesses cited include gameplay that might be considered too simple, and a poor multiplayer mode on the PC.

FHM gave the PS2 version a score of four stars out of five and called it "Manic, frenzied and violent gaming at its gripping best." The Cincinnati Enquirer also gave the same version four stars out of five and stated that "This new 'bad boy' of the video game industry is extremely fun to play — for those old enough and mature enough to purchase it — as a campy stress releaser at the end of a bad day." However, Maxim gave the same version a score of six out of ten and said, "Such virtual destruction may once have seemed innocent, but these days the whole thing hits a little close to home." Entertainment Weekly gave said version a C, saying, "Four levels are too few to stay interesting for all 175-plus missions, which are too bloody repetitive." The Village Voice gave the Xbox version a similar score of five out of ten and said, "In 'Revolution' mode—a series of nearly identical, frustrating mini-missions—the jackbooted thugs, now armed with pistols, make life much tougher. (Deeply flawed camera views don't help.) What's the point if you can't steal your family some diapers?"

Before its release, the game was denounced by Washington state politicians for its similarity to the real-life 1999 World Trade Organization riots and protests in Seattle which caused $3 million in damages. The game features the fictional "American Trade Organization" as the antagonistic establishment.

It was a runner-up for GameSpot's annual "Best Graphics (Technical) on PlayStation 2" award, which went to Ratchet & Clank.

== Sequel ==
A sequel, State of Emergency 2, was released in 2006. This game was once again developed by VIS Entertainment; during production, the company became insolvent and the game was completed by DC Studios before being released by SouthPeak Games.
