= Barkley, Shut Up and Jam: Gaiden =

2008 video game

- Developer: Tales of Game's Studios
- Engine: Game Maker
- Platforms: Microsoft Windows, Mac OS X
- Release: January 22, 2008
- Genre: Role-playing
- Mode: Single-player

Barkley, Shut Up and Jam: Gaiden (Note: The full title for the game is Tales of Game's Studios Presents Chef Boyardee's Barkley, Shut Up and Jam: Gaiden, Chapter 1 of the Hoopz Barkley SaGa.) is a freeware role-playing video game developed by Tales of Game's Studios, jokingly presented as an official sequel to both Barkley Shut Up and Jam! and Space Jam. It features traditional JRPG-styled battles and dungeons.

== Gameplay ==
The player controls ex-NBA player Charles Barkley and a handful of secondary characters. A host of ex- and current NBA players also feature as NPCs.

The game's battle system, dubbed the "B.A.B.B.Y. System", is influenced by many commercial JRPGs. Enemies appear on the game field and may run at the player and attack if the player moves into their line of sight. Once a battle is initiated, each character has a number of attacks and skills they can use. Most attacks require multiple or timed button presses similar to the Mario RPG series, some attacks are accuracy-based, dealing more damage for more accurate hits. Characters can also be placed into healing, attack, and effect battle roles, depending on their skill set.

== Plot ==
In 2041 "post-cyberpocalyptic Neo New York", Charles Barkley performs a powerful "Chaos Dunk" at a basketball game, inadvertently killing most of the people in attendance. As a result, basketball is outlawed and many basketball players are hunted down and killed.

In 2053, another Chaos Dunk is performed in Manhattan, killing millions. Barkley is blamed for the Chaos Dunk and is hunted by the B-Ball Removal Department, led by Michael Jordan. Barkley is rescued by another outlaw referred to as the Ultimate Hellbane. Hellbane leads Barkley to the tomb of LeBron James, revealing that Hellbane's real name is Balthios, the mixed-race great-grandson of James. The ghost of James tells the two to seek the Cyberdwarf, who is hidden in New York's sewers. While searching for the Cyberdwarf, they are joined by a cybernetic Vince Carter, who has lost his memory. Upon finding Cyberdwarf, the four of them rush to a nearby church, where Barkley's son Hoopz is hiding. In the church, Jordan kills Father Larry Bird and holds Hoopz hostage. Cyberdwarf, looking at Hoopz, comments that Hoopz may be "The One"; this comment restores Carter's memory. He was killed along with many other basketball stars, but was rebuilt by the terrorist organization B.L.O.O.D.M.O.S.E.S. to kill Hoopz. Carter joins with Jordan, but the two are driven off by Barkley and his party.

Cyberdwarf theorizes that B.L.O.O.D.M.O.S.E.S. used a powerful basketball called the Ultimate B-Ball, the same B-Ball used by the Monstars in Space Jam to steal the powers of basketball players, including Barkley himself, to perform the recent Chaos Dunk, so they travel to the old Spalding building to find a rumored extremely powerful basketball. There, they discover that such a ball had been created, dubbed the Hell B-Ball. This ball was so powerful that a janitor who mishandled it inadvertently performed a Chaos Dunk in the building years ago. With the Hell B-Ball in hand, the party seeks out B.L.O.O.D.M.O.S.E.S.

They find the B.L.O.O.D.M.O.S.E.S. headquarters on the slave ship Necron 5. After freeing Carter from his programming and defeating Jordan in basketball combat, they find the leader of B.L.O.O.D.M.O.S.E.S., a shadowy version of Barkley created by the Ultimate B-Ball to destroy all life on Earth with a super-powerful Chaos Dunk, then repopulate the earth with Barkley clones. Shadow Barkley is defeated, but machinery on the ship is set to perform the Chaos Dunk without Shadow Barkley. Barkley stays behind while the rest of the party escapes from the Necron 5. The Monstars attempt to stop the trio from escaping, Balthios holds them off while Hoopz and Cyberdwarf successfully leave Necron 5 using an escape pod. Charles Barkley then performs another Chaos Dunk, destroying the ship and saving the earth; seemingly killing him, Shadow Barkley and Balthios in the process.

== Development ==
Barkley was developed by Tales of Game's Studios, a group of several members from an amateur game development forum. The team were inspired after reading an awkward phrase on Michael Jordan's Wikipedia page about a fan debate over whether or not the film Space Jam was canon - the line made unclear whether the film's canonicity was being considered in regards to the Looney Tunes series proper or to Michael Jordan's life in general. Key members Chef Boyardee, bort, GZ, and quackgyver all had a hand in the development of the game, with other, more minor contributions being made by several others. The game was first developed on the RPG Maker 2003 game engine, but was later ported to Game Maker 6.1. Originally the game was planned to be released in both engines, but eventually the latter was chosen due to its increased power and flexibility.

At the 2014 Awesome Games Done Quick event, the developers have stated they had never played the original Shut Up and Jam game. The developers created Barkley, Shut Up and Jam: Gaiden after brainstorming ideas for an RPG that made them laugh.

== Cancelled sequel ==
In November 2012, Tales of Game's announced the game's sequel, The Magical Realms of Tír na nÓg: Escape from Necron 7 – Revenge of Cuchulainn: The Official Game of the Movie – Chapter 2 of the Hoopz Barkley SaGa, with a crowdfunding campaign on Kickstarter.com to help fund it. The campaign for funding TMRoTnnEfN7RoCTOGotMC2otHBS ended on December 28 and raised $120,335.

While the sequel was to retain the original's self-aware tone, all of the artwork was being created from scratch to avoid copyright issues. Developer Hiratio revealed in June 2019 that the majority of the development team had left the project, leaving only two people working on it part-time. By June 2021, the game was officially cancelled, and the source code repository (with assets included) was released to the public under a CC BY-NC 4.0 license.

== See also ==
- Shaq Fu: A Legend Reborn
