= State of Emergency 2 =

2006 video game

- Developer: DC Studios
- Publisher: SouthPeak Interactive
- Series: State of Emergency
- Platform: PlayStation 2
- Release: NA: February 14, 2006; EU: April 21, 2006
- Genre: Third-person shooter
- Mode: Single-player

State of Emergency 2 is a 2006 third-person shooter video game developed by DC Studios and released exclusively for the PlayStation 2. Versions for the PlayStation Portable, Xbox, and Windows were set for release, but were cancelled. It is the sequel to 2002's State of Emergency and takes place four years after the first game. It features more game modes and an enhanced engine. State of Emergency 2 was being developed by VIS Entertainment for Rockstar Games, but the title was continued by SouthPeak Interactive with developer DC Studios.

== Reception ==
Reception

Aggregate score
| Aggregator | Score |
|---|---|
| Metacritic | 44/100 |

Review scores
| Publication | Score |
|---|---|
| 1Up.com | D+ |
| Electronic Gaming Monthly | 5.67/10 |
| Eurogamer | 2/10 |
| Game Informer | 6/10 |
| GameRevolution | D |
| GameSpot | 5.2/10 |
| GameSpy | 2/5 |
| GameZone | 4/10 |
| IGN | 5.3/10 |
| Official U.S. PlayStation Magazine | 1/5 |
| The Times | 2/5 |

The game received "unfavorable" reviews according to video game review aggregator website Metacritic.
