= Space Jam (video game) =

1996 sports video game

- North American PlayStation cover
- Developer: Sculptured Software
- Publisher: Acclaim Entertainment
- Engine: NBA Jam Extreme
- Platforms: Sega Saturn; PlayStation; MS-DOS
- Release: PlayStation: NA: November 15, 1996; EU: March 14, 1997; Saturn: NA: November 26, 1996; JP: February 28, 1997; EU: March 14, 1997; DOS: NA: December 2, 1996
- Genre: Sports (basketball)
- Modes: Single-player, multiplayer

Space Jam is a sports video game that ties in with the film of the same name, and based on Looney Tunes characters by Warner Bros. It was released for the Sony PlayStation and Sega Saturn consoles, and MS-DOS computers. Unlike the film and real rules of basketball, each team plays 3-on-3. Players have a choice whether to play as the TuneSquad or the Monstars. It features basic controls and 2D graphics. The game was developed by Sculptured Software, who also developed the Looney Tunes-based basketball game Looney Tunes B-Ball for Sunsoft the year prior to the production of the Space Jam film, and published by Acclaim Entertainment, who also published the NBA Jam series of basketball games.

== Gameplay ==
Before the actual game of basketball begins, Daffy Duck takes part in a game where he has to find parts of Michael Jordan's uniform, avoiding the family dog Charles. In-between quarters, mini-games such as Shoot Out, Space Race, and Hall of Hijinx are available; after the 2nd quarter, Bugs takes part in a minigame where he has to find water bottles containing Michael's secret stuff.

== Reception ==
Reception

Review scores
Publication	Score
Computer Games Magazine	2/5 (PC)
Consoles +	79% (PS1)
Electronic Gaming Monthly	5.25/10 (PS1)
GameRevolution	D (PS1)
GameSpot	3.6/10 (PS1)
Mega Fun	78% (PS1)
Next Generation	1/5 (PS1)
PlayStation Official Magazine – Australia	7/10 (PS1)
Super Game Power	3.5/5 (PS1 & SAT)
Video Games (DE)	27% (PS1 & SAT)
Saturn Power	46/100 (SAT)
Sega Saturn Magazine	53% (SAT)

Space Jam received unfavorable reviews, with critics generally commenting that the basketball is overly simplistic and easy. Some attributed this to the unbalanced characters, stating that Michael Jordan is overpowered and the Monstars are all underpowered. Most found the mini-games to be poor. The graphics were also criticized, with many critics saying they could have been done on 16-bit consoles, though the depictions of the popular Looney Tunes characters were praised.

GamePro described the game as "ordinary". GameSpot's Tom Ham stated that "despite the use of much-loved Warner Bros. cartoon characters, Space Jam fails miserably in every category." Dan Hsu and Crispin Boyer of Electronic Gaming Monthly also panned the game, while their co-reviewers Shawn Smith and Sushi-X defended it, arguing that it was clearly designed for children, making the simplistic gameplay and low difficulty appropriate for its target audience. A reviewer for Next Generation countered this argument by pointing out that it uses one more button than NBA Jam does, which he felt made it too complicated for young players. He remarked that "While it's hard to forgive the poor basketball, it's even harder to like Space Jam given the disc's numerous carnival style mini games ... They add some variety, but are so simplistic that the effort put into creating them would have been much better spent on improving the core game." Sega Saturn Magazine's Lee Nutter felt that Space Jam was decent as a multiplayer game, but fell short of other basketball games on the market, most notably Acclaim and Sculptured Software's own NBA Jam Extreme.
