= VIS Entertainment =

British video game developer

VIS Entertainment Limited
- Formerly: VIS Interactive (1996–2000)
- Company type: Subsidiary
- Industry: Video games
- Founded: 1996; 30 years ago
- Founders: Chris van der Kuyl; Peter Baillie
- Defunct: 7 April 2005
- Fate: Administration
- Successor: 4J Studios
- Headquarters: Edinburgh, Scotland
- Key people: Chris van der Kuyl (president, CEO)
- Number of employees: 42 (2005)
- Parent: BAM! Entertainment (2004–2005)
- Subsidiaries: State of Emergency Development; VIS iTV (50%)

VIS Entertainment Limited (formerly known as VIS Interactive) was a British video game developer based in Edinburgh. Chris van der Kuyl and Peter Baillie established the company in 1996. In 2003, VIS Entertainment faced financial struggles and closed its studios in London and on the Isle of Wight, while downsizing its VIS iTV joint venture. After BAM! Entertainment acquired the studio in May 2004, VIS Entertainment was placed into administration in April 2005, subsequently being liquidated and dissolved.

== History ==
Chris van der Kuyl founded VIS Interactive in 1996, alongside Peter Baillie, some former developers from DMA Design, and other "techy people" from outside the video game industry. A Dundee native, van der Kuyl headed the company as president and chief executive officer. In 2000, VIS Interactive was renamed VIS Entertainment.

In April 2003, the company acquired the London-based development studio of BAM! Entertainment. In the same year, VIS Entertainment faced financial issues as reimbursements to investors meant that it could not finance its active projects. As a result, the company closed its studio on the Isle of Wight in July of that year, laying off all staff. The company further announced the impending closure of its London studio in September 2003, citing project delays and cancellations. In November, VIS iTV, a Dundee-based joint venture between VIS Entertainment and cable operator Telewest, laid off 75% of its staff. Jane Karowoski, VIS Entertainment's chief operating officer whose task it was to implement cost reductions, subsequently announced her resignation. VIS iTV's sole product, the "interactive virtual horseracing" project I-Race, was to debut on the newly established sports satellite channel iSports TV, but these plans never materialised and VIS iTV was placed into administration in December 2004. In January 2005, Bellwether Group, a California-based venture capital group, acquired VIS iTV and I-Race and hired five of its previous staff, intending to market the product in the United States.

On 18 February 2004, BAM! Entertainment announced that it had reached an agreement to acquire VIS Entertainment and its subsidiary State of Emergency Development, which had been set up to fund development for State of Emergency 2, for shares worth roughly US$7 million. The acquisition was completed by 25 May 2004. Despite the acquisition, VIS Entertainment was placed into administration on 7 April 2005. Tom Maclennan and Kenny Craig of Tenon Recovery were installed as administrators. Subsequently, VIS Entertainment's Dundee studio was shut down and its 26 employees laid off. Another 28 positions were cut at the Edinburgh headquarters, with the remaining 42 "sent home" during the administration process. VIS Entertainment founder van der Kuyl established 4J Studios on 19 April. The rights to State of Emergency 2 were sold to DC Studios announced in May 2005, and the company intended to hire between 10 and 40 former VIS Entertainment developers. The administration ended in March 2007 and, following its liquidation, the entity was dissolved in July 2014.

== Games ==
Year	Title	Platform(s)	Publisher(s)
1998	H.E.D.Z.	Windows	Hasbro Interactive
1999	Earthworm Jim 3D	Nintendo 64, Windows	Interplay Entertainment, Rockstar Games
2000	Tom and Jerry in Fists of Furry	Nintendo 64, Windows	NewKidCo, Ubi Soft
2001	The Powerpuff Girls: Chemical X-Traction	Nintendo 64, PlayStation	BAM! Entertainment
2002	State of Emergency	PlayStation 2, Windows, Xbox	Rockstar Games, Global Star Software
2002	Tom and Jerry in War of the Whiskers	GameCube, PlayStation 2, Xbox	NewKidCo
2002	The Powerpuff Girls: Relish Rampage	GameCube, PlayStation 2	BAM! Entertainment
2003	Evil Dead: A Fistful of Boomstick	PlayStation 2, Xbox	THQ
2005	Narc	PlayStation 2, Windows, Xbox	Midway Games, Zoo Digital Publishing
2005	Brave: The Search for Spirit Dancer	PlayStation 2, Wii, Xbox 360	Sony Computer Entertainment, Evolved Games, SouthPeak Games
