= Barkley Shut Up and Jam! =

1994 basketball video game

- North American Sega Genesis cover art
- Developer: Accolade
- Publishers: Genesis: NA/EU: Accolade; Super NES: NA: Accolade; EU: Sony Electronic Publishing; JP: Den'Z; Evercade: WW: Piko Interactive
- Producer: Danny Pisano
- Designers: Charles Barkley; Kathy Ells; Tony Hsieh; Danny Pisano; Bob Smith
- Programmers: Bob Smith; Fred Mack; Tony Hsieh
- Artist: Kathy Ells
- Composers: Dominique Messinger; Rick Rhodes
- Series: Barkley Shut Up and Jam
- Platforms: Sega Genesis, Super NES, Evercade
- Release: Genesis: NA: March 1994; EU: March 8, 1994; Super NES: NA: June 1994; EU: December 1994; Evercade: WW: April 2021
- Genre: Sports
- Modes: Single-player, multiplayer

Barkley Shut Up and Jam! (Note: Also known as Barkley's Power Dunk (Japanese: バークレーのパワーダンク, Hepburn: Bākurē no Pawādanku) in Japan on the SNES.) is a basketball video game originally developed and published by Accolade for the Sega Genesis in March 1994. The game is the first entry in the Barkley Shut Up and Jam series, featuring former NBA MVP Charles Barkley prominently and as one of the playable characters.

Featuring arcade-style gameplay similar to Midway's NBA Jam but closely following the rules seen in street basketball, players compete with either CPU-controlled opponents or against other players in matches across various cities of the United States. Originally known as Charles Barkley Basketball during development and initially released on the Genesis, it was later ported to the Super Nintendo Entertainment System and first released on North America in June 1994 and this version was released months later in both Japan and Europe on the same year by Den'Z and Sony Electronic Publishing respectively.

Barkley Shut Up and Jam! received a mixed reception when it was released on both platforms, with reviewers praising the graphics, sound and multiplayer, while others criticized the controls, lackluster animations and gameplay, with critics also comparing the game with NBA Jam. Ports for the PC and Atari Jaguar were in development but never released. A sequel, Barkley Shut Up and Jam 2, was exclusively released for the Genesis in 1995. The game and its sequel have since received newer ports without Barkley's branding under the name of Hoops Shut Up and Jam!.

== Gameplay ==
Gameplay screenshot showcasing a match in Miami (Genesis version)

Barkley Shut Up and Jam! is a two-on-two street basketball game where players take control of either former NBA MVP Charles Barkley or one of fifteen fictitious basketball players in a progressive series of matches on outdoor courts across different cities of the United States, with the exception of Phoenix, which takes place in an indoor court. Though very similar to NBA Jam in terms of gameplay and controls, the game provides a faster and more aggressive pace by containing less basketball play regulations and never penalizing a player, which emulates the looser and rougher nature of casual, urban basketball. The court locations has no effect on gameplay, while each of the playable characters has a unique set of status skills, encouraging players to figure out which character fits their play style the best. Despite that, Barkley has the best stats overall.

Like NBA Jam, players has access to a turbo function that allows the characters to move faster and steal easier. The player starts with the ability to use turbo six times but must earn each use back by performing well. Unlike NBA Jam, the player can not control their teammate, who is instead controlled by the computer. A stable mechanic in Barkley is that your opponents have a very high chance of performing a difficult shot in the final seconds of the match, scoring their team three of four points, if they have the ball at the time, requiring the player to plan around this as the match is coming to an end. Aside from the main single-player game mode, there is also a series mode as well as a tournament mode that allows up to 16 players. The game has no save feature and utilizes a password system to keep progress through tournament mode. There are no major differences between the Genesis and Super NES versions besides graphics and sound, while each version of the game features support for up to four players with the Sega Team Player and Super Multitap adapters respectively.

== Development and release ==
Barkley Shut Up and Jam! was first released for the Sega Genesis on North America in March 1994 and Europe in April 1994 by Accolade, in addition being released in Brazil by Tec Toy. It was then ported to the Super Nintendo in North America in June 1994 and was later released in Japan by Den'Z on September 30 of the same year under the title Barkley's Power Dunk, and lastly in Europe by Sony Electronic Publishing in December of the same year as well. A PC port of the game was in development and planned to be released on the same period as with the Genesis and SNES versions but it was never released for unknown reasons.

=== Atari Jaguar version ===
Gameplay screenshot from the unreleased Atari Jaguar version of Barkley Shut Up and Jam!, showcasing a match in Chicago

In November 1993, Accolade signed an agreement with Atari Corporation to be a third-party developer for the then-recently released Atari Jaguar and licensed five titles from their catalog to Atari Corp. in order to be ported and released for the system, with Barkley Shut Up and Jam! (under its original development title) being among the five licensed games and it was first announced in early 1994. The port was later showcased by Atari in an early playable state at WCES '95, featuring redrawn sprites and digitized graphics, with plans for a Q2 1995 release but was later rescheduled to be published in September 1995.

Internal documents from Atari Corp. revealed that Ringler Studios was behind the conversion and it was listed as still being developed in August 1995. It was later previewed by Ultimate Future Games magazine in their supplementary issue from October of the same year dedicated to the Jaguar, now featuring digitized sprites instead of the hand-drawn sprites from both Genesis and SNES versions, and was slated for a late 1995 release. Other internal documents from Atari still listed the port as in development on December of the same year and was last previewed by GamePro magazine in 1996. The port was ultimately never officially released during the commercial run of the system, which was discontinued by Atari in April 1996 before merging with JT Storage in a reverse takeover during the same month. According to ex-Atari producer Faran Thomason, the port was almost complete.

On May 14, 1999, Hasbro Interactive released the patents and rights of the Jaguar into public domain and declared the system as an open platform, opening the doors for homebrew development and allowing independent publisher and developers to release unfinished titles from the past life cycle of the system. A beta build of the Jaguar version of Barkley Shut Up and Jam! was released by B&C Computervision in July 2002 for US$60. The Jaguar version of the game features digitized graphics and sprites along with the same gameplay, modes, stages and number of playable characters as with the 16-bit versions, but the roster (with the exception of Charles Barkley) are unique to the port. This version also features support for up to four players with the Team Tap adapter. Also unique to this version is a Pong minigame that can be played during the loading screen after selecting a court to play due to the compressed graphics.

== Reception ==
Reception

Aggregate score
Aggregator	Score	
Aggregator	Sega Genesis	SNES
GameRankings	N/A	64%

Review scores
Publication	Score	
Publication	Sega Genesis	SNES
AllGame	2/5	2/5
Computer and Video Games	56 / 100	N/A
GamePro	16.5 / 20	15.5 / 20
Nintendo Power	N/A	12.8 / 20
Consoles +	80%	69%
GamesMaster	80%	N/A
Hobby Consolas	N/A	80 / 100
Joypad	73%	N/A
MAN!AC	61%	N/A
Mean Machines Sega	74 / 100	N/A
Mega	54%	N/A
Megablast	78%	N/A
Mega Drive Advanced Gaming	56%	N/A
Mega Force	65%	N/A
Mega Fun	77%	N/A
MegaTech	70%	N/A
Nintendo Player	N/A	3/6
Play Time	83 / 100	N/A
Player One	70%	75%
Power Unlimited	90 / 100	N/A
Sega Magazine	62 / 100	N/A
Sega Power	77%	N/A
Sega Pro	77 / 100	N/A
Total!	N/A	4+ (D+)
Video Games	73%	73%

GamePro gave the Genesis version a positive review, citing the variety of distinctive playable characters, the multiple gameplay modes, and the "distinctive urban look" to each of the seven courts, though they did criticize the controls as being inconsistent in their responsiveness.

A reviewer for Sega-16 was more critical overall, countering much of GamePro's positive opinions. Sega-16 took offense with the "incomprehensible" voice samples and called the music hit-or-miss as well as too often reused for different locations. They took a stance that the controls were responsive and tight, but were disappointed by the size of the roster, when NBA Jam, the game's foil, had been out already and had more than three times as many characters to choose from. They did agree that the visual details and overall urban-street atmosphere were both surprisingly a treat, and consistent.

== Legacy ==
A sequel, Barkley Shut Up and Jam 2, was released in 1995 exclusively for the Sega Genesis.

Over a decade later, a surreal role-playing indie fangame under the misleading title Barkley, Shut Up and Jam: Gaiden was released in 2008 as an unofficial sequel to both the original Barkley Shut Up and Jam! and Space Jam. Due to critical acclaim, coverage by several gaming journalism sites and its novel premise, Shut Up and Jam: Gaiden and its cancelled sequel have dwarfed the official series by Accolade in both popularity and relevance.

Piko Interactive later acquired the rights to the game and its sequel and re-released them in a compilation cartridge for the Evercade handheld under the names Hoops Shut Up and Jam and Hoops Shut Up and Jam 2 in 2021. Hoops Shut Up and Jam was also released as part of Accolade Sports Collection by Atari and QuByte Interactive on January 30, 2025 for PlayStation 4, PlayStation 5, Xbox One, Xbox Series S and Series X and PC.

== See also ==
- Jammit
- Shaq Fu
- Michael Jordan: Chaos in the Windy City
- Slam City with Scottie Pippen
