= T-pose =

3D model pose built primarily for animation purposes

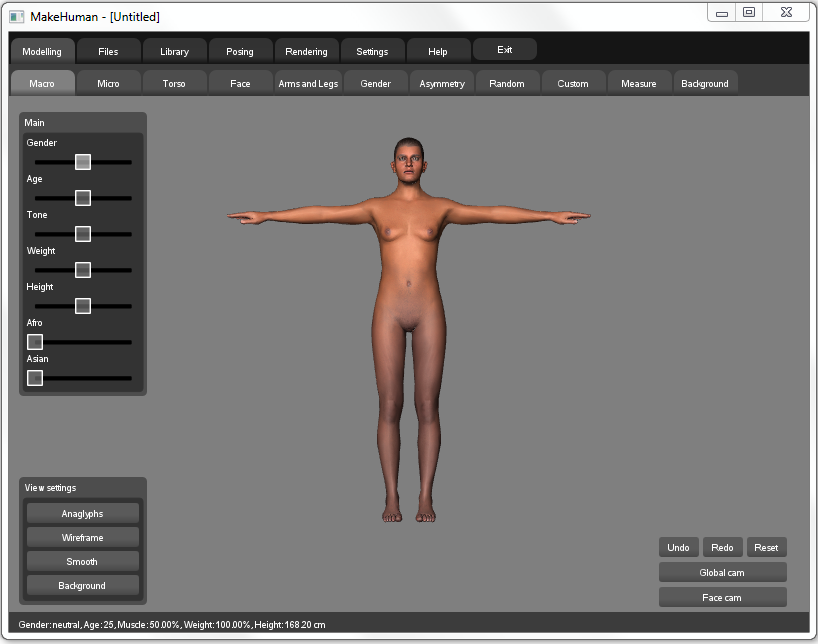
Example of a T-posing model in MakeHuman software.

In computer animation, a T-pose is a default posing for a humanoid 3D model's skeleton before it is animated. It is called so because of its shape: the straight legs and arms of a humanoid model combine to form a capital letter T. When the arms are angled downwards, the pose is sometimes referred to as an A-pose instead. Likewise, if the arms are angled upward, it is called a Y-pose. Generic terms encompassing all these (especially for non-humanoid models) include bind pose, blind pose, and reference pose.

== Usage ==
The T-pose is primarily used as the default armature pose for skeletal animation in 3D software, which is then manipulated to create animation. The purpose of the T-pose relates to the important elements of the body being axis-aligned, thereby making it easier to rig the model for animation, physics, and other controls. Depending on the exact geometry of the model, other poses such as the A-pose may be more suitable for vertex deformation around areas such as the shoulders.

Outside of being default poses in animation software, T-poses are typically used as placeholders for animation not yet completed, particularly in 3D animated video games. In some motion capture software, a T-pose must be assumed by the actor in the motion capture suit before motion capturing can begin. There are other poses used, but the T-pose is the most common one.

== As an Internet meme ==
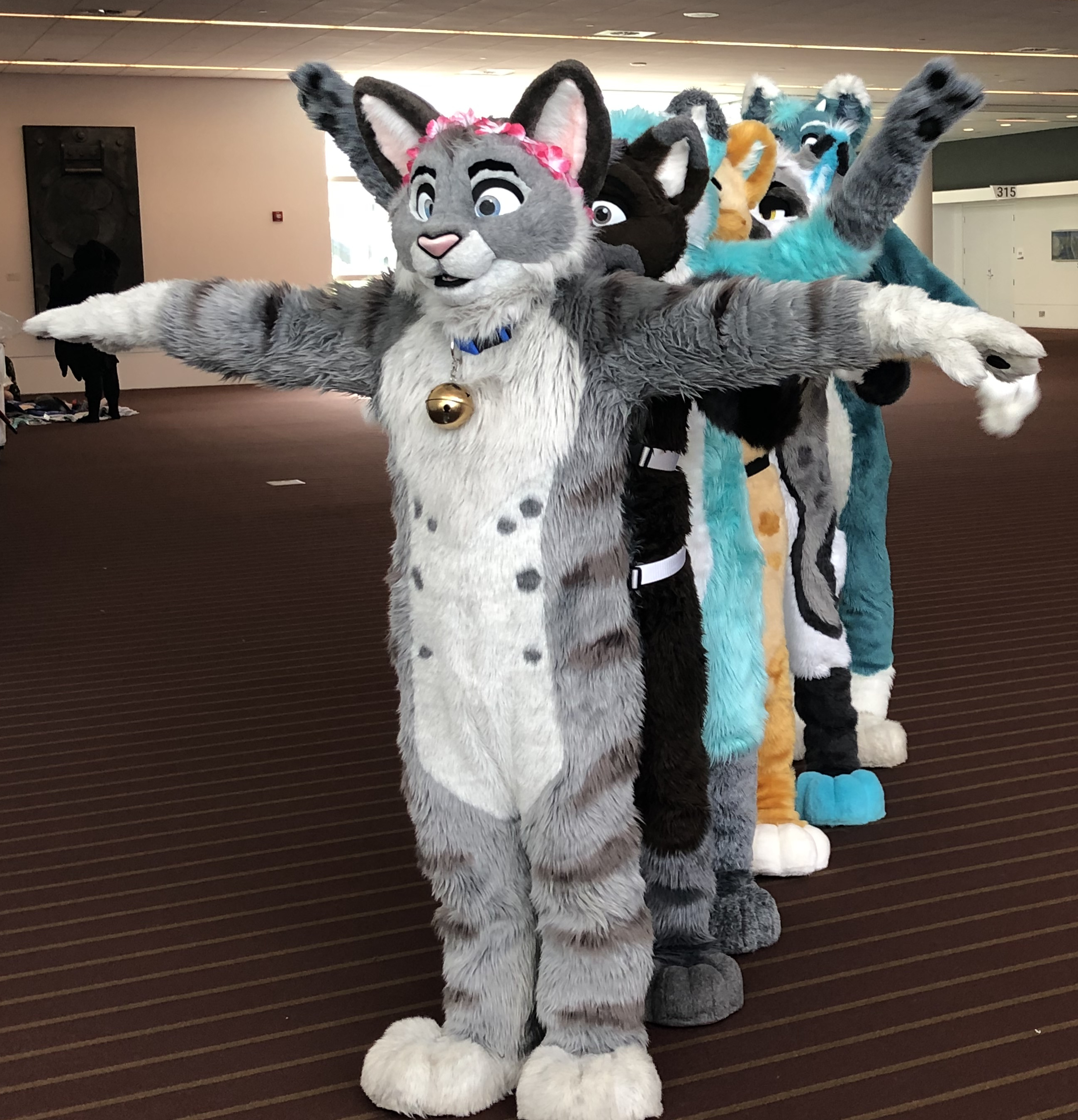
Fursuiters posing; the frontmost in a classic T-pose

Starting in 2016 and resurfacing in 2017, the T-pose has become a widespread Internet meme due to its bizarre and somewhat comedic appearance, especially in video game glitches where a character's animation is unexpectedly supplanted by a T-pose.

In a prerelease video of the game NBA Elite 11, the demo was filled with glitches, notably one unintentionally showing a T-pose in place of the proper animation for the model of player Andrew Bynum. The glitch later gained fame as the "Jesus Bynum glitch". Publisher EA eventually cancelled the game as they found it unsatisfactory. A similar occurrence happened with Cyberpunk 2077.

In the 2023 Formula One season, driver George Russell performed a T-pose in the opening credits of the series' TV broadcasts. This quickly became a meme within the motorsports community. Russell repeated the pose after claiming pole position at the 2024 Canadian Grand Prix and winning the 2024 Austrian Grand Prix.

== See also ==
- Vitruvian Man, a diagram by Leonardo da Vinci with the figure of a man making a T and a jack
