= Jim Henson's Bear in the Big Blue House =

2002 video game

- Cover art
- Developers: Ubi Studios UK (Game Boy Color); DC Studios (PlayStation)
- Publisher: Ubi Soft
- Platforms: Game Boy Color; PlayStation
- Release: Game Boy Color: NA: 21 March 2002; PlayStation: NA: 9 December 2002
- Genres: Action, educational
- Mode: Single-player

Jim Henson's Bear in the Big Blue House is a 2002 video game published by Ubi Soft for the Game Boy Color and PlayStation, based on The Jim Henson Company and Disney Channel children's television show of the same name. A title for the Game Boy Advance was planned by Ubi Soft, but never released.

== Gameplay ==
A screenshot of the Game Boy Color version of Jim Henson's Bear in the Big Blue House

In Bear in the Big Blue House, the player controls Ojo and explores the House to collect presents and jigsaw puzzle pieces to complete a Birthday Picture. The game features two modes: Adventure, in which the player explores the House to locate individual characters to complete seven minigames and obtain pieces, and Activity, in which the player can complete minigames on their own. Each minigame has two difficulty modes, and span simple games involving mazes, catching, and memory tests.

== Reception ==
Reception

Review scores
Publication	Score
AllGame	3/5
Game Boy Xtreme	79%
Total Advance	70%

Bear in the Big Blue House received mixed reviews. Writing for Game Boy Xtreme, John Hagerty praised the game for its "nice graphics and variety of challenges on offer", although noting as a children's game "none of the sub-games are particularly difficult" and it "won't appeal to anyone old enough to read this review". Total Advance concurred the game would provide "a good few hours of educational fun" to its "definite target audience" of young children, sardonically noting it was not for anyone "old enough to go to the toilet without help".
