= NBA Jam Extreme =

1996 video game

- Sega Saturn cover art featuring Shawn Kemp and Hakeem Olajuwon
- Developer: Sculptured Software
- Publisher: Acclaim Entertainment
- Composers: Mark Ganus; Roy Wilkins; James Hebdon; H. Kingsley Thurber; Dean Morrell; Paul Webb
- Series: NBA Jam
- Platforms: PlayStation, Sega Saturn, Arcade, Windows
- Release: PlayStation: NA: November 1, 1996; Saturn: NA: November 26, 1996; EU: December 6, 1996; Arcade; 1996; Windows: NA: February 1997
- Genre: Sports
- Modes: Single-player, multiplayer
- Arcade system: Sony ZN-1

NBA Jam Extreme is a 1996 basketball arcade game by Acclaim Entertainment based on the 1996–97 NBA season. After Midway Games released two NBA Jam games, Acclaim, the publisher of the home versions of NBA Jam, ended up winning the exclusive rights to use the Jam name. NBA Jam Extreme was the first Jam game from Acclaim, as well as the first edition of the game to use 3D graphics. In contrast, Midway's competing NBA game NBA Hangtime featured 2-D visuals similar to the previous Jam games. Extreme also features longtime sports broadcaster Marv Albert doing commentary instead of original commentator Tim Kitzrow. New to the game is the "Extreme" button, essentially a super version of the series' trademark "Turbo" button. The cover features Shawn Kemp of the Seattle SuperSonics, and Hakeem Olajuwon of the Houston Rockets.

The game was used as the basis for a PlayStation demo game titled NBA 2Ball, which was based on the NBA's 2Ball competition for the 1998 NBA All-Star Weekend. The demo featured rosters from the 1997–98 NBA Season, with each team having three players. Acclaim also released a series of follow-ups to Extreme, most of which were more traditional basketball simulations.

== Roster ==
NBA Jam Extreme features many of the top players from the 1996–97 NBA season, with some notable omissions. Chief among them were Michael Jordan, Charles Barkley and Shaquille O'Neal. Jordan and O'Neal had contracts with Electronic Arts that resulted in the Jordan game Chaos in the Windy City and O'Neal appearing in Shaq-Fu and the NBA Live games. Barkley had signed a deal with Accolade to appear in its Barkley Shut Up and Jam! games.

== Development ==
The player animations were built from motion capture footage of Juwan Howard of the Washington Bullets. Digitized images of NBA players were scanned and then mapped onto the characters' heads.

As part of a joint promotion with Nestlé, contest labels were printed on the inside of the wrappers for Nestlé brand candy bars, with the grand prize being a personalized copy of NBA Jam Extreme including the contest winner in digitized form as a playable character.

== Reception ==
Reception

Review scores
Publication	Score
Electronic Gaming Monthly	8.5/10 (PS1)
GameRevolution	C+ (SAT)
GameSpot	6.1/10 (PS1); 4.2/10 (SAT); 4.9/10 (PC)
Next Generation	3/5 (ARC); 2/5 (PS1)
PC PowerPlay	39% (PC)
Sega Saturn Magazine	70% (SAT)

Reviewing the arcade version, a Next Generation reviewer commented, "It may be debated whether an expanded roster (including six players per team/160-plus NBA players), updated graphics (123,000 texture-mapped polygons per second in a full 3D environment), or additional features (an extreme button and the 'alley-oop' play) improve the actual gameplay from the previous Jam incarnations. ... But what won't be argued is that the successful combination of humor and solid offensive play is still there." His one major criticism was that the new 3D camera often confuses the player about their positioning.

The home versions of NBA Jam Extreme received mixed reviews. In GameSpot, Glenn Rubenstein wrote that the graphics compared favorably to those in Midway's NBA Hangtime and also praised the large number of hidden features. However, he criticized the slow pace of the game and loading time. GamePro was also pleased with the PlayStation version's graphics, as well as the retention of the features from the original NBA Jam. They criticized the controls and held that the game is not as fun as NBA Hangtime, but considered it good in absolute terms. Despite scoring it high enough for the "EGM Silver" award, the two sports reviewers of Electronic Gaming Monthly also expressed misgivings about the game, specifically a lack of intelligent challenge, its running at a lower speed than the sprite-based games in the series, and disorienting camera work. However, they called it "a dead-on port" of the arcade version. Next Generation, contrarily, said: "the PlayStation version doesn't look or play as good as the arcade version, which is surprising since the arcade version ran on the PlayStation-compatible System 11 board." The reviewer said the game has overall poor playability, making NBA Hangtime the better game despite Extreme's superior graphics.

Josh Smith heavily criticized the Saturn version's visuals as "blurry and unclear, choppy and awkwardly animated" and said that they hampered gameplay. While he did offer praise for the game's special features and sound effects, he gave it a rating of "Poor". Writing about the PC version, Tasos Kaiafas criticized the game for being largely the same as the previous Jam games and pointed out performance problems as well as lackluster visuals compared to other PC basketball games. In a review for the Sega Saturn version, Game Revolution also faulted the game for not making much progress beyond the original NBA Jam, as well the loading time. In contrast, Paul Glancey wrote in Sega Saturn Magazine that "existing Jam devotees should find Jam Extreme just as entertaining as its forebears, and with enough in the way of new features to make it worth adding to their collections." However, he criticized that single-player games tend to devolve into a back-and-forth where a score by one team is quickly followed by a score by the other team, as the jerky graphics make it hard to follow the course of the ball and thus difficult to intercept the team in possession of the ball.

== See also ==
- List of NBA video games
