= NBA Hoopz =

2001 video game

- Developers: Eurocom Entertainment Software; Torus Games (GBC)
- Publisher: Midway Home Entertainment
- Producer: Brian Lowe
- Programmers: Paul Bates; Mark Hetherington; Dave Long
- Composers: Aubrey Hodges; John Hey; Neil Baldwin; Guy Cockcroft
- Platforms: PlayStation, PlayStation 2, Dreamcast, Game Boy Color
- Release: February 13, 2001: PlayStation; NA: February 13, 2001; EU: April 13, 2001 Dreamcast; NA: February 15, 2001; EU: April 13, 2001 Game Boy Color; NA: February 15, 2001 PlayStation 2; NA: February 26, 2001; EU: April 13, 2001
- Genre: Sports (basketball)
- Modes: Single-player, multiplayer

NBA Hoopz is a 2001 basketball video game published by Midway. It is the sequel to NBA Hangtime and NBA Showtime: NBA on NBC. Hoopz was the only 3-on-3, arcade-style basketball video game available during the 2000–01 NBA season. Shaquille O'Neal is featured on the game cover.

== Overview ==
Rather than 5-on-5 action like professional play, or 2-on-2 like its predecessors, this game features 3-on-3 play. Using players from the NBA, each player chooses a guard, forward, and center from the team's NBA roster for the first half and can make substitutions for the second half.

NBA Hoopz is an arcade-style game and not meant to be realistic: players can jump twenty or thirty feet in the air, dunk the ball from 20 feet (6.1 m) away, and do otherwise physically impossible things. Fouls are only called on flagrant pushes, foul shots are rare (and only after a number of fouls are accumulated), and there is no out of bounds. In addition, after a player makes three consecutive shots he becomes "on fire" which allows him to make almost any shot as well as goaltend without penalty. The PlayStation 2 and Dreamcast versions accommodate up to four players.

The uniforms for the Orlando Magic and Phoenix Suns were not updated for the game. These teams sported the uniforms they had in the 1997-98 NBA season instead of the ones they had in the 2000-01 NBA season.

== Reception ==
Reception

Aggregate scores
Aggregator	Score			
Aggregator	Dreamcast	GBC	PS	PS2
GameRankings	71%	43%	52%	59%
Metacritic	65/100	N/A	N/A	63/100

Review scores
Publication	Score			
Publication	Dreamcast	GBC	PS	PS2
AllGame	2.5/5	2/5	2/5	N/A
Electronic Gaming Monthly	7.5/10 (Note: Three critics of Electronic Gaming Monthly gave the Dreamcast version each a score of 7.5/10.)	2.5/10	3/10	7.5/10
EP Daily	N/A	N/A	N/A	5.5/10
Game Informer	N/A	N/A	N/A	5.75/10
GameSpot	6.9/10	6.1/10	6.3/10	5.7/10
GameZone	9/10	N/A	N/A	N/A
IGN	7.4/10	N/A	2/10	4/10
Jeuxvideo.com	10/20	N/A	8/20	10/20
Next Generation	N/A	N/A	N/A	2/5
Official U.S. PlayStation Magazine	N/A	N/A	3/5	3/5
The Cincinnati Enquirer	N/A	N/A	N/A	3.5/5
Maxim	6/10	N/A	N/A	N/A

The Dreamcast and PlayStation 2 versions received "mixed" reviews, according to the review aggregation website Metacritic. GameZone gave the former console version universal acclaim, a few weeks before its release date. Rob Smolka of NextGen said of the latter console version, "Sloppy dunk animations and a blatant lack of originality draws [sic] a technical foul on NBA Hoopz."

Dan Elektro of GamePro's April 2001 issue said of the Dreamcast version, "Goodies like player creation and season mode, along with mini-games like 2ball, can't make up for the main game's fatal identity crisis. NBA Hoopz comes off as a simulation wannabe, simultaneously betraying Showtime fans and only weakly attracting serious hoop addicts. Stick with NBA 2K1." (Note: GamePro gave the Dreamcast version 4.5/5 for graphics, 3.5/5 for sound, and two 3/5 scores for control and fun factor.) He also said of the PlayStation version, "Give Midway credit for trying, but not much more. If Showtime left you wanting more stats and details, Hoopz might fit the bill, but Live is a better sim." (Note: GamePro gave the PlayStation version three 3/5 scores for graphics, sound, and control, and 2.5/5 for fun factor.) However, he said of the Game Boy Color version, "Maybe someone at Midway will get the hint that the Game Boy should have its own basketball game to match its capabilities, instead of constantly forcing the GB to do things it can't and shouldn't do. In a word, NBA Hoopz sucks." (Note: GamePro gave the Game Boy Color version 4/5 for graphics, two 2.5/5 scores for sound and fun factor, and 3/5 for control.) An issue later, Jake The Snake said of the PlayStation 2 version, "Even with a locker room full of features—including four mini-games, such as 21ball and 21—Hoopz isn't great but is decent enough that some gamers, especially those with short attention spans, will prefer it over EA's NBA Live." (Note: GamePro gave the PlayStation 2 version two 4/5 scores for graphics and sound, 3/5 for control, and 3.5/5 for fun factor.)
