= Takumi =

- Pronunciation: Tá-k(ú)-mí
- Gender: male, female

Origin
- Origin: Japanese
- Meaning: different meanings depending on the Hiragana, kanji used
- Region of origin: Japanese

Takumi (たくみ, タクミ) is a male Japanese given name; it can also be written in hiragana or katakana. It is also a surname using various kanji characters.

== Written forms ==
Takumi can be written using different kanji characters and can mean:

as a given name

- 匠, "artisan"
- 巧, "adroit"
- 工, "skill"
- 卓美, "eminent, beauty"
- 卓巳, "eminent, serpent"
- 巧海, "adroit, sea"
- 拓海, "clear (the land), sea"
- 拓未, "clear (the land), future"
- 拓巳, "clear (the land), serpent"
- 拓実, "clear (the land), fruit"

as a surname

- 琢己
- 宅見

== People ==
with the given name Takumi

- Takumi Abe (阿部 巧; born 1991), Japanese footballer
- Takumi Adachi (安達 巧; born 1966), Japanese sport wrestler
- Takumi Akiyama (秋山 拓巳; born 1991), Japanese professional baseball pitcher
- Takumi Beppu (別府 匠; born 1979), Japanese former racing cyclist
- Takumi Endoh (遠藤 卓実; born 1984), Japanese motorcycle racer
- Takumi Fujitani (藤谷 匠; born 1995), Japanese footballer
- Takumi Fujiwara (sailor) (born 1962), Japanese sailor
- Takumi Furukawa (古川 卓己; 1917–2018), Japanese film director
- Takumi Hama (濱 託巳; born 1996), Japanese footballer
- Takumi Hasegawa (basketball) (長谷川 技; born 1989), Japanese basketball player
- Takumi Hasegawa (footballer) (長谷川 巧; born 1998), Japanese footballer
- Takumi Hashimoto (橋本 巧; born 1989), Japanese former footballer
- Takumi Horiike (堀池 巧; born 1965), Japanese footballer
- Takumi Horiuchi (born 1949), Japanese sailor
- Takumi Iroha (彩羽 匠; born 1993), Japanese professional wrestler
- Takumi Ishizaki (石崎 巧; born 1984), Japanese retired basketball player
- Takumi Itō (伊藤 匠; born 2002), Japanese professional shogi player
- Takumi Ito (伊藤 匠; born 2000), Guamanian footballer
- Itow Takumi (伊藤 卓美; born 1946), Japanese printmaker
- Takumi Kamijima (上島 拓巳; born 1997), Japanese footballer
- Takumi Kanaya (金谷 拓実; born 1998), Japanese professional golfer
- Takumi Kawanishi (川西 拓実; born 1999), Japanese idol, member of JO1
- Takumi Kitamura (北村 匠海; born 1997), Japanese actor, singer, and model
- Takumi Kitamura (baseball) (北村 拓己; born 1995), Japanese baseball player
- Takumi Kiyomoto (清本 拓己; born 1993), Japanese professional footballer
- Takumi Kobe (神戸 拓光; born 1985), Japanese former baseball outfielder
- Takumi Komatsu (小松 拓幹; born 1997), Japanese footballer
- Takumi Kuki (九鬼 巧; born 1992), Japanese sprinter
- Takumi Kuriyama (栗山 巧; born 1983), Japanese professional baseball player
- Takumi Kurohara (黒原 拓未; born 1999), Japanese baseball player
- Takumi Kusumoto (楠本 卓海; born 1995), Japanese footballer
- Takumi Mase (真瀬 拓海; born 1998), Japanese footballer
- Takumi Matsumoto (松本 卓巳; born 1994), Japanese para-badminton player
- Takumi Minamino (南野 拓実; born 1995), Japanese footballer
- Takumi Mitani (三谷 たくみ; born 1986), Japanese female singer
- Takumi Miyayoshi (宮吉 拓実; born 1992), Japanese footballer
- Takumi Miyoshi (三好 匠; born 1993), Japanese former professional baseball infielder
- Takumi Mori (森 巧; born 1963), Japanese wrestler
- Takumi Morikawa (森川 拓巳; born 1977), Japanese former football player
- Takumi Motohashi (本橋 卓巳; born 1982), Japanese footballer
- Takumi Murakami (村上 巧; born 1989), Japanese footballer
- Takumi Nagaishi (永石 拓海; born 1996), Japanese footballer
- Takumi Nagao (長尾 巧; 1891–1943) Japanese geologist and paleontologist
- Takumi Nagasawa (長澤 卓己; born 1992), Japanese footballer
- Takumi Nagura (名倉 巧; born 1998), Japanese footballer
- Takumi Nakamura (中村 拓海; born 2001), Japanese footballer
- Takumi Nakayama (中山 巧; born 2001), Japanese mixed martial artist
- Takumi Nakazawa (中澤 工; born 1976), Japanese video game writer
- Takumi Narasaka (奈良坂 巧; born 2002), Japanese footballer
- Takumi Nemoto (根本 匠; born 1951), Japanese politician
- Takumi Nomura (野村 拓海; born 1997), Japanese badminton player
- Takumi Obara (小原 工; born 1967), Japanese triathlon athlete
- Takumi Ohshiro (大城 卓三; born 1993), Japanese professional baseball catcher
- Takumi Onuma (小沼 巧; born 1985), Japanese politician
- Takumi Oshima (大嶋 匠; born 1990), Japanese professional baseball player
- Takumi Otomo (大友 工; 1925–2013), Japanese professional baseball player
- Takumi Saito (racewalker) (西塔 拓己; born 1993), Japanese racewalker
- Takumi Saitoh (斎藤 工; born 1981), Japanese actor and filmmaker
- Takumi Sasaki (佐々木 匠; born 1998), Japanese footballer
- Takumi Shibano (柴野 拓美; 1926–2010), Japanese science-fiction translator and author
- Shibata Takumi (fund manager) (柴田 拓美; born 1953), Japanese fund manager
- Shibata Takumi (politician) (柴田 巧; born 1960), Japanese politician
- Takumi Shima (島 卓視; born 1967), Japanese footballer
- Takumi Shimada (島田 拓海; born 1996), Japanese footballer
- Takumi Shimohira (下平 匠; born 1988), Japanese football player
- Takumi Takahashi (高橋 巧; born 1989), Japanese motorcycle racer
- Takumi Terada (寺田 匠; born 2000), Japanese kickboxer
- Takumi Tsuchiya (土屋 巧; born 2003), Japanese professional footballer
- Takumi Tsukamoto (塚本 拓海; born 1991), Japanese professional wrestler
- Takumi Uesato (上里 琢文; born 1990), Japanese football player
- Takumi Wada (和田 拓三; born 1981), Japanese football player
- Takumi Watanabe (bartender) (渡邉 匠; born 1972), Japanese bartender
- Takumi Watanabe (渡辺 匠; born 1982), Japanese footballer
- Takumi Yamada (山田 拓巳; born 1989), Japanese footballer
- Takumi Yamamoto (山本 拓実; born 2000), Japanese baseball player
- Takumi Yamanoi (山ノ井 拓己; born 1998), Japanese footballer
- Takumi Yamazaki (山崎 たくみ; born 1964), Japanese voice actor

with the surname Takumi

- Masa Takumi (宅見 将典; born 1978), Japanese Grammy Award-winning multi-instrumentalist, composer, and music producer
- Masaru Takumi (宅見 勝; 1936–1997), Japanese yakuza
- Roy Takumi (born 1952) American politician
- Shu Takumi (巧 舟), Japanese video game developer
- Yasuaki Takumi (内匠 靖明; born 1982), Japanese actor and voice actor

== Fictional characters ==
- Takumi Aiba, a main protagonist of the game Digimon Story: Cyber Sleuth
- Takumi Fujiwara, the main character of the manga and anime series Initial D
- Takumi Hayakawa, a supporting character in Blast of Tempest
- Takumi Hayama, a character from the novel series Takumi-kun
- Takumi Hayami, from Sky Girls
- Takumi Ichinose (巧), a character in the manga and anime series Nana
- Takumi Kisaragi (タクミ), a character in the anime series Gad Guard
- Takumi Mayama (巧), a character in the manga, anime, and TV drama series Honey and Clover
- Takumi Tokiha (巧海), a character in the anime series My-HiME and My-Otome
- Takumi Tsuzuki, a character in the anime series Mayoi Neko Overrun!
- Takumi Usui, a character in the manga and anime series Kaichou wa Maid-sama!
- Takumi Aldini, a character from Shokugeki no Soma
- Takumi (Hiroman), a character from Stitch!
- Takumi, a character from the video game Fire Emblem Fates
- Takumi Inui, a character from the Japanese show Kamen Rider 555
- Takumi Mukai, a character from the Japanese video game and anime series The Idolmaster Cinderella Girls
- Takumi Someya, a character from the video game Yakuza 6: The Song of Life
- Takumi Shinada, a character from Delicious Party Pretty Cure
- Takumi Sumino, a character from The Hundred Line: Last Defense Academy

== Other uses ==
- Takumi-kun, a Japanese novel series
- Takumi Corporation, a Japanese video game company
- 10617 Takumi, a main-belt asteroid
