= NBA Jam (2010 video game) =

- North American Wii box art
- Developer: EA Canada
- Publisher: EA Sports
- Producers: Nick Channon; Nathan McDonald
- Designer: Jeremy Tiner
- Programmer: Andrew Pojar
- Artist: Rob Hilson
- Series: NBA Jam
- Platforms: PlayStation 3, Xbox 360, Wii, iOS, Windows Phone, Android, Mac OS X
- Release: October 5, 2010: Wii; NA: October 5, 2010; AU: October 14, 2010; EU: January 20, 2011 PlayStation 3, Xbox 360; NA: November 17, 2010; AU: November 25, 2010; EU: November 26, 2010 iOS February 10, 2011 OS X December 14, 2011 Android March 15, 2012 Windows Phone March 21, 2013 On Fire; NA: October 4, 2011 (PS3); WW: October 5, 2011
- Genre: Sports (basketball)
- Modes: Single-player, multiplayer

NBA Jam is a basketball video game developed by EA Canada and published by EA Sports. It is the latest installment in the NBA Jam video game franchise, released in 2010. The game was initially planned to be available as a full retail release for the Wii, with the PlayStation 3 and Xbox 360 versions available for download via a coupon upon purchasing NBA Elite 11. Following the delay and eventual cancelation of Elite, the PS3 and Xbox 360 versions were released as standalone titles in November 2010.

The game has a unique visual style, using 3D models with high-resolution photographs for the heads of each of the players. Several aspects such as the outrageous slam dunks and the ball catching on fire return from the original games. Original NBA Jam creator Mark Turmell served as a consultant. Tim Kitzrow, the announcer from the original NBA Jam also returned, re-recording all the lines from previous NBA Jam titles. All NBA Rosters are accurate as of April 7, 2010. The Mac version of the game is also available for Mac OS X through the Mac version of the Mac App Store, making it the only official computer version of the game.

== Gameplay ==
An in-game screenshot of NBA Jam on iOS, demonstrating the controls on that platform

NBA Jam is a 2-on-2 basketball game with a unique art style. In the game, the bodies take on a 3D look, while their heads take on a 2D look, which have realistic digitized likenesses.

The game retains its usual exaggerated nature of play - players jump many times their own height, making slam dunks that defy both human capabilities and the laws of physics. There are no fouls, free throws, or violations except defensive goaltending and shot clock violations. This means the player is able to freely shove or elbow his opponent out of the way. Additionally, the game has an "on fire" feature, where if one player makes three baskets in a row, he becomes "on fire" and has unlimited turbo, no goaltending, and increased shooting ability, until the other team scores (or the player has scored nine consecutive baskets while "on fire").

Some new features in NBA Jam include Campaign, which has 1-on-1 boss battles; Elimination, which includes up to four players and the player with the lowest number of points is the loser; 21, which is a 1-on-1 match where the first one to get 21 points is the winner; and Domination.

The game is filled with Easter Eggs, special features and players activated by initials or button/joystick combinations. For example, players can enter special codes to unlock hidden players. Some characters can only be unlocked by completing certain challenges.

=== Wii ===
The Wii version of the game is split into two modes, a classic mode which plays like a traditional NBA Jam experience, and a Remix Tour which features all new camera angles, power-ups and boss battles. Players are able to choose between Wii Remote, Wii Remote and Nunchuck, Classic Controller, and Classic Controller Pro control styles. Online play is not supported.

At the end of the game, players have to battle NBA legends Larry Bird and Earvin "Magic" Johnson. The game also features more than 30 other legends including: Manute Bol, Clyde Drexler, Julius Erving, Kevin McHale, Hakeem Olajuwon, Dennis Rodman, Detlef Schrempf, Isiah Thomas, Spud Webb, and James Worthy.

=== PlayStation 3 and Xbox 360 ===
In November 2010, a standalone game was released from EA Sports. A downloadable HD version of NBA Jam for PlayStation 3 and Xbox 360 was planned to be bundled with copies of NBA Elite 11. This version initially lacked the Wii version's Remix Tour mode, but included online multiplayer. However, due to the delay of NBA Elite 11 (followed by its eventual cancellation), the HD versions of NBA Jam would now be standalone products; they were released in November 2010, and included the Remix Tour mode. EA Sports President Peter Moore stated that the Xbox 360 and PlayStation 3 versions would be released "before the holidays" in 2010, and the game would be released on retail disc. On October 21 EA announced they would release full retail copies of the game on both Xbox 360 and PlayStation 3 on November 17, and would retail for $49.99. These enhanced versions would feature upgraded HD visuals and online play, and would receive further online updates in December.

== Release ==
A remastered edition of the game, subtitled On Fire was released for the Xbox 360 and PS3 in October 2011 as a downloadable title. NBA Jam: On Fire Edition compensates for this with improved gameplay mechanics, graphics, and sound.

== Reception ==
=== NBA Jam ===
NBA Jam

Aggregate score
Aggregator	Score			
Aggregator	iOS	PS3	Wii	Xbox 360
Metacritic	87/100	71/100	79/100	75/100

Review scores
Publication	Score			
Publication	iOS	PS3	Wii	Xbox 360
Destructoid	N/A	N/A	7.5/10	N/A
Eurogamer	N/A	7/10	N/A	7/10
Game Informer	N/A	N/A	8.25/10	N/A
GamePro	4.5/5	N/A	4/5	N/A
GameSpot	N/A	7/10	7/10	7/10
GameTrailers	N/A	N/A	7.5/10	N/A
Giant Bomb	N/A	4/5	4/5	4/5
IGN	8.5/10	7.5/10	8.5/10	7.5/10
Joystiq	N/A	N/A	4/5	N/A
Nintendo Power	N/A	N/A	9/10	N/A
Official Xbox Magazine (US)	N/A	N/A	N/A	7/10
Pocket Gamer	3.5/5	N/A	N/A	N/A
PlayStation: The Official Magazine	N/A	6/10	N/A	N/A
TouchArcade	4.5/5	N/A	N/A	N/A
411Mania	N/A	7.5/10	8.8/10	7.5/10
Metro	N/A	N/A	7/10	N/A

NBA Jam received "generally favorable reviews" on all platforms except the PlayStation 3 version, which received "average" reviews, according to the review aggregation website Metacritic. IGN called the Wii version "an incredibly fun pick-up-and-play game with an insane competitive edge." Game Informer said that the same console version's only major flaw is its lack of online multiplayer. GameTrailers said that the lack of online play in the same console version hurts its value as a retail product. GameZone gave the same console version seven out of ten and stated, "With an all too familiar feeling, NBA Jam serves as homage to the games we have lost from yesteryear. What it boils down to is: the gameplay hasn't changed all that much and aside from unlocking the plethora of classic players such as Detlef Schrempf and Chris Mullin, there's little reason to return to NBA Jam after a few hours of play." PlayStation Official Magazine – Australia gave the PS3 version eight out of ten, saying that it "always succeeded by being better with friends, and that hasn't changed. There's an updated remix mode with a few new modes that are more gimmick and curious distractions than serious contenders for your time. You'll get the most amount of playtime out of the standard mode, especially when you're really dominating a game against your mates." However, PlayStation Official Magazine – UK gave it six out of ten, saying that "it'll keep you amused for an hour every few weeks."

=== On Fire Edition ===
NBA Jam: On Fire Edition

Aggregate score
Aggregator	Score	
Aggregator	PS3	Xbox 360
Metacritic	81/100	85/100

Review scores
Publication	Score	
Publication	PS3	Xbox 360
GamePro	4/5	4/5
GameRevolution	B+	N/A
GameSpot	8.5/10	8.5/10
GameTrailers	N/A	7.8/10
GameZone	9/10	9/10
IGN	9/10	9/10
PlayStation Official Magazine – Australia	8/10	N/A
PlayStation Official Magazine – UK	8/10	N/A
Official Xbox Magazine (US)	N/A	8/10
PlayStation: The Official Magazine	8/10	N/A
411Mania	N/A	9.2/10

The On Fire Edition received "favorable" reviews on both platforms according to Metacritic.

During the 15th Annual Interactive Achievement Awards, the Academy of Interactive Arts & Sciences nominated NBA Jam: On Fire Edition for "Sports Game of the Year".
