= NBA Showtime: NBA on NBC =

1999 video game

- Arcade flyer
- Developers: Midway Games (Note: Ported to Nintendo 64 and PlayStation by Eurocom, and to Dreamcast by Avalanche Software.); Torus Games (GBC)
- Publisher: Midway Games
- Programmer: Mark Turmell
- Artist: Sal Divita
- Composer: Jon Hey
- Platforms: Arcade, PlayStation, Dreamcast, Nintendo 64, Game Boy Color
- Release: Arcade: NA: April 5, 1999; Dreamcast, Nintendo 64, PlayStation: NA: November 16, 1999; EU: November 26, 1999 (DC); EU: April 28, 2000 (PS); Game Boy Color: NA: February 10, 2000
- Genre: Sports (basketball)
- Modes: Single-player, multiplayer

NBA Showtime is a basketball arcade game released by Midway in 1999, featuring teams and players from the National Basketball Association (NBA). The game is modeled after the NBA presentations on NBC and takes its name from NBC's NBA pregame show. It is the successor to Midway's previous basketball titles NBA Hangtime and NBA Jam. Showtime was also featured in a dual game cabinet along with NFL Blitz 2000 that Midway dubbed the "SportStation." Midway followed up the game with the console exclusive NBA Hoopz.

== Gameplay ==
The game features gameplay similar to its predecessors NBA Jam and NBA Hangtime. Rather than typical 5 on 5 action, this game features 2-on-2 play with the ability to pick two players from any NBA team's starting line-up for the first half and can choose again for the second. The game introduces personal fouls for each shove on another player; after a certain number of fouls the opposing team gets a free throw. The game retains the series standard "on fire" feature. After a player makes three consecutive shots he becomes "on fire", which allows him to easily make shots from almost anywhere, as well as goaltend without penalty and push opponents without being charged a foul. Play otherwise is similar to NBA rules. The arcade version accommodates up to four players, as do the home versions produced for the Nintendo 64 and Dreamcast.

== Development ==
Midway first hinted at the development of Showtime in the end credits to its previous basketball title, Maximum Hangtime, promising the next entry in the series would have a new "third dimension."

Early previews and screenshots of the game in publications such as GamePro and Tips & Tricks indicate that Midway originally intended for Showtime to be the first in the series to feature 3-on-3 gameplay. In a 2002 interview conducted by Game Informer with Mark Turmell, Showtime's lead programmer, he noted that issues with slowdown and having the game run at 60 frames per second led to a decision to revert to a 2-on-2 structure for gameplay, prior to showing up in arcades. Showtime's sequel, NBA Hoopz, would later become the first game in the series to implement 3-on-3 action.

Showtime utilized Midway's Vegas arcade hardware system, allowing the game to render 1,000,000 polygons per second at 60 frames per second of animation, roughly twice the graphical performance of the arcade version of Midway's NFL Blitz. The game's player models and face textures were crafted in part using footage exclusively shot for the game by NBC in the lead up to its television coverage of the 1998–99 NBA season. Lead artist Sal Divita's work on the game was achieved using 3D rendering software such as LightWave 3D, Wavefront and Film Box.

The announcer from NBA Jam, Tim Kitzrow, returned, after Midway used the Bulls radio announcer Neil Funk in NBA Hangtime. Jon Hey produced all the sound, music and script save for the NBC basketball theme "Roundball Rock" by John Tesh. At the time, the music was influenced by 2Pac and Dr. Dre's "California Love" and Master P's "Make 'Em Say Uhh!" and previous NBA Themes written by Jon Hey for NBA Jam and NBA Hangtime.

As with the previous NBA Jam and NBA Hangtime games, the game contains many secret characters, including members of the Midway staff and 12 NBA mascots. The arcade version features the Universal Monsters Frankenstein's monster, Bride of Frankenstein, The Mummy, The Wolf Man and Creature from the Black Lagoon. The Universal Monsters characters remained exclusive to the arcade version and were not available in any of the game's various home versions. Detroit Pistons legend Isiah Thomas is the only former NBA player included as a secret character in the game, across all versions. Dennis Rodman, a member of the Los Angeles Lakers' roster when the game initially shipped, was in later revisions alternately classified as a secret character, and as selectable from the roster of the Dallas Mavericks starting with version 3.0.

The original arcade version shipped with team rosters from the beginning of the 1998–99 NBA season. After the release of the console versions, the game featured team rosters from prior to the 1999–2000 NBA season, then Midway released a "Gold" update for arcades with rosters from midway through the 1999-2000 NBA season, shortly before the midseason trading deadline.

Charles Barkley and Shaquille O'Neal, both previously absent in all versions of NBA Jam Tournament Edition and NBA Hangtime, and home console ports of NBA Jam due to licensing issues, are selectable players in Showtime.

== Reception ==
Reception

Aggregate score
Aggregator	Score				
Aggregator	Arcade	Dreamcast	GBC	N64	PS
GameRankings	N/A	78%	47%	72%	62%

Review scores
Publication	Score				
Publication	Arcade	Dreamcast	GBC	N64	PS
AllGame	N/A	4/5	N/A	3.5/5	2/5
CNET Gamecenter	N/A	8/10	N/A	6/10	N/A
Electronic Gaming Monthly	N/A	8.5/10	N/A	7.875/10	N/A
Game Informer	7.5/10	7.25/10	N/A	7.25/10	6.5/10
GameFan	N/A	89% (F.M.) 82%	N/A	72%	N/A
GamePro	N/A	5/5	N/A	(D.E.) 4.5/5 (iBot) 4/5	(D.E.) 4.5/5 (A.H.) 3.5/5
GameRevolution	N/A	B	N/A	C+	D
GameSpot	N/A	7.5/10	N/A	6.8/10	6.8/10
GameSpy	N/A	8/10	N/A	N/A	N/A
IGN	N/A	8.8/10	3/10	7.1/10	6.9/10
Next Generation	N/A	N/A	N/A	3/5	N/A
Nintendo Power	N/A	N/A	6.8/10	8.2/10	N/A
Official U.S. PlayStation Magazine	N/A	N/A	N/A	N/A	3/5

The Dreamcast version received "favorable" reviews, and the Nintendo 64 and PlayStation versions received mixed or average reviews, while the Game Boy Color version received "unfavorable" reviews according to video game review aggregator platform GameRankings. Doug Trueman of NextGen said that the N64 version "would probably best be called NBA Jam 64", calling it "Arcade-style basketball action captured remarkably well on Nintendo 64."
