= Dan Roberts (announcer) =

American public address announcer

Dan Roberts is an American public address announcer best known for his work for the Utah Jazz of the National Basketball Association. He held this position from 1979 to 2025, the entirety of the team's stay in Utah to that point in time, becoming the longest tenured PA announcer in the NBA.

Throughout each Utah Jazz game, Roberts was known to address the Delta Center crowd by asking, "How 'bout this jazz?". His favorite Jazz basketball player is Karl Malone, whose baskets he announced by saying, "The Mailman delivers!"

Dan's son, Jeremy, is also a PA Announcer, having worked for several professional and college teams since 1998. He filled in for Dan on the few occasions he missed games; Dan had missed fewer than 10 games in 41 years as the Jazz announcer.

Before joining the Jazz, Roberts was the public address announcer for Utah Utes men's basketball. He also called the University of Utah-hosted 1979 national championship game between Indiana State and Michigan State, featuring Larry Bird and Magic Johnson. Dan has also done radio, as well as voice overs for numerous television and radio commercials.

On September 13, 2024, it was announced that Dan would be retiring after the 2024-2025 NBA season.
