= NBA Hangtime =

1996 video game

- Arcade flyer
- Developer: Midway (Note: Ported to 16-bit consoles by Funcom, to PlayStation and Nintendo 64 by Midway Studios San Diego and Director's Cut International, and to Windows by High Voltage Software.)
- Publisher: Midway
- Programmer: Mark Turmell
- Artist: Sal Divita
- Composers: Jon Hey; Kevin Quinn
- Platforms: Arcade, Super NES, Genesis/Mega Drive, Windows, Nintendo 64, PlayStation
- Release: April 1996: Arcade; NA: April 1996 Super NES; NA: November 5, 1996; EU: February 21, 1997 Genesis/Mega Drive; NA: November 5, 1996; EU: February 21, 1997 Windows; NA: December 4, 1996 Nintendo 64; NA: January 16, 1997; EU: September 1, 1997 PlayStation; NA: June 3, 1997
- Genre: Sports (basketball)
- Modes: Single-player, multiplayer
- Arcade system: Midway Wolf Unit

NBA Hangtime is a 1996 basketball video game developed and published by Midway for arcades. Home versions were released for the Nintendo 64, PlayStation, Super NES, Sega Genesis, and Microsoft Windows.

Hangtime was the third basketball game by the original development team behind the NBA Jam series. The title was changed due to the NBA Jam name being acquired by Acclaim Entertainment, the publisher of the games for the home market. Acclaim's NBA Jam Extreme was released the same year as Hangtime. Features introduced in Hangtime included character creation, alley oops, and double dunks. A software update known as NBA Maximum Hangtime was released for the arcades later in the life cycle. A sequel, NBA Showtime: NBA on NBC, was released in 1999.

The theme song "Whatcha Gonna Do?" was produced by rapper M-Doc of Indasoul Entertainment.

== Gameplay ==
The gameplay is largely the same as Midway's NBA Jam games, with some additions. One of the most prominent additions is the "Create Player" feature, which allows players to create a custom basketball player, specifying height, weight, power, shooting, and defensive skills using a limited number of attribute points. Created players can be made more powerful as players earn additional attribute points by winning games.

The game retains many of the same rules of NBA Jam: Tournament Edition, including the two-on-two match ups, statistics tracking, legal pushing and "on fire" mode. Additions to the gameplay include spin moves, alley oops and double slam dunks - a slam dunk performed after one team member in the middle of a dunk passes to the other member. Alley-oops and double dunks can trigger the new "team fire" mode in which both team members are on fire.

Each team now has five members of the roster to choose from. The original arcade version features team rosters from the 1995–96 NBA season, while the home console versions feature team rosters that were accurate to the 1996–97 NBA season. The player can select from any of the 29 NBA teams and match them in four quarters of NBA basketball (three minutes each), with three-minute overtimes if necessary. Just as in the NBA Jam games, the game can keep track of the teams a player has beaten using a player's created ID and PIN. Optionally, the player can load their created player. Players using their ID face off against a series of NBA teams, starting with the Vancouver Grizzlies and ending with the Chicago Bulls (who were on their way to being NBA champions at the time of the game's release; the game, however, does not feature Michael Jordan, who had returned from his sabbatical around that time, due to Midway choosing not to pursue his individual image rights). After beating all 29 teams, the player faces off against a number of secret characters.

New to the game is a three-digit "combination lock" feature. Similar to the "Kombat Kodes" in Mortal Kombat 3, the feature allows players to enter codes on the Match Up screen that alter the game's appearance and/or gameplay.

The initial arcade version and the home versions included an NBA trivia quiz at the end of each game played. Answering enough trivia questions correctly in the arcade game originally qualified players for a prize drawing, while on home versions it gives players more attribute points for their created players.

== Home versions ==
Midway released home versions of the game for the PlayStation and Nintendo 64, as well as for the previous generation's consoles, the Sega Genesis and Super NES. Funcom developed the Genesis and Super NES versions, while High Voltage Software developed a Microsoft Windows and was also working on a Sega Saturn version, but it was never released. A version for Game.com was also announced, but cancelled.

Los Angeles Lakers center Shaquille O'Neal is not licensed in either version of Hangtime, as he was given clearance for NBA Showtime: NBA on NBC.

In 2020, Tastemakers LLC, under its Arcade1Up brand, released a 3/4 scale arcade cabinet that included Hangtime, alongside its precursors NBA Jam and NBA Jam: Tournament Edition. Code Mystics developed this version of Hangtime, a largely faithful emulation of the arcade original, but with some players omitted due to issues with licensing.

== Reception ==
Reception

Aggregate score
Aggregator	Score
GameRankings	70% (N64)

Review scores
Publication	Score
Electronic Gaming Monthly	7.75/10 (N64); 5.5/10 (PS1)
GameSpot	5.2/10 (N64); 5.4/10 (PS1); 7.3/10 (PC)
IGN	5.4/10 (N64)
N64 Magazine	52% (N64)
Next Generation	3/5 (ARC); 2/5 (N64)

Computer and Video Games dubbed Hangtime "the real, and quite worthy, successor to NBA Jam TE". The graphics improvements were lauded, as were the new features, moves and the created player feature. A reviewer for Next Generation likewise attested that "NBA Hangtime has all the playable qualities of NBA Jam, plus a slew of perks that make this worthy of your arcade quarters." He was particularly impressed with the Create a Player mode, and said the fact that this costs an extra quarter is more than balanced by the fact that the custom player is permanently written into the arcade cabinet's memory. Despite this, he scored it only 3 out of 5 stars.

The home ports received mixed reviews. In contrast to their reviews for the arcade version, most critics remarked that the game does not offer enough new features over NBA Jam, though they disagreed as to how much of a problem this is. Reviewing the Nintendo 64 version, GamePro concluded that "Jam-style hoops is nothing new, but Hangtime does it with enough flash and freshness to keep you happily dunkin' like a fool." They cited the selection of players, numerous secrets, smooth graphics, multiplayer matches, and create-a-player mode. They rated the Genesis version lower in every category except control, noting the weaker sound effects and announcer's voice. However, they gave it a similar recommendation. GamePro found that the Super NES version likewise suffers from inferior graphics and sound but is still highly enjoyable to play. Doug Perry of IGN also praised the create a player feature, calling it "easily one of the coolest elements of the game, and separates it from the pack." Perry wrote that the port didn't make much use of the N64's capabilities, but called it a "fun, arcade-perfect port that will bring most basketball fans lots (sic) enjoyment." GameSpot was far more negative, with Jeff Gerstmann reviewing the N64 version and writing that the game only featured "minor changes" and concluding "Unless you've been shooting digital hoops in a cave for the past few years, you've seen it all before." A reviewer for Next Generation agreed: "Basically, if you've played NBA Jam, then you've played most of NBA Hangtime." He further criticized that aside from the support for four players without the use of a multitap, the game make poor use of the Nintendo 64's capabilities, with 2D graphics and a low frame rate. He went so far as to say that the Super NES version of NBA Jam looks equally good and plays better due to the more appropriate controller. The two sports reviewers of Electronic Gaming Monthly had a more middling response. Joe Rybicki, similarly to Gerstmann and Next Generation, said the game "offers basically nothing new, except updated players and bigger character sprites." Co-reviewer Todd Mowatt, while criticizing that the AI tends towards goal-tending, felt the game was an overall improvement over the 16-bit basketball games.

The PlayStation version was criticized for its long loading times and rampant slowdown, and reviews uniformly recommended buying the Nintendo 64 version instead. Kraig Kujawa was far more positive about the PC version, saying that it was an accurate conversion, although lamenting that it didn't include online play.

In 1997 Electronic Gaming Monthly listed NBA Hangtime as the 5th best arcade game of all time.

== Maximum Hangtime ==
NBA Maximum Hangtime is an upgrade released in late 1996 to the arcade version of NBA Hangtime featuring the 1996-1997 NBA rosters. Otherwise, the gameplay is essentially the same except for the addition of a hidden "hot spot" on the court for each player where they shoot more accurately. "Maximum" also has some additional secret codes and hidden players.
