= List of commercial video games with available source code =

This is a list of commercial video games with available source code. The source code of these commercially developed and distributed video games is available to the public or the games' communities.

In several of the cases listed here, the game's developers released the source code expressly to prevent their work from becoming lost. Such source code is often released under varying (free and non-free, commercial and non-commercial) software licenses to the games' communities or the public; artwork and data are often released under a different license than the source code, as the copyright situation is different or more complicated. The source code may be pushed by the developers to public repositories (e.g. SourceForge or GitHub), or given to selected game community members, or sold with the game, or become available by other means. The game may be written in an interpreted language such as BASIC or Python, and distributed as raw source code without being compiled; early software was often distributed in text form, as in the book BASIC Computer Games. In some cases when a game's source code is not available by other means, the game's community "reconstructs" source code from compiled binary files through time-demanding reverse engineering techniques.

== Games with source code available on release ==
| Title | First release | Genre | Engine license | Content license | Original developer | Additional information |
|---|---|---|---|---|---|---|
| Akalabeth: World of Doom | 1979 | Role-playing video game | Public domain software | Freeware | Richard Garriott | Richard Garriott distributed the Applesoft BASIC written game originally as source code. Also later Origin Systems offered the source code on their FTP servers. |
| Barkley 2 | 2021 (cancelled) | ARPG | Proprietary/CC BY-NC 4.0 (engine/game code) | CC BY-NC 4.0 | Tales of Game's Studios | Source code released to the public under no license on 11 June 2021, upon the cancellation of the game. |
| Barotrauma | 2017 | Role-playing video game | restrictive (only mods) | Proprietary | Undertow Games / Joonas "Regalis" Rikkonen | The game was released in 2017 commercially on Steam by independent developer Undertow Games (Joonas "Regalis" Rikkonen). Source code was released on 4 June 2017 on GitHub under a restrictive mods allowing license. His previous game, SCP – Containment Breach, is also available as free and open-source software under CC BY-SA license. |
| Beneath a Steel Sky Remastered | 2009 | Adventure game | GPLv2+ | Proprietary | Revolution Software | Source code released under the GPL. |
| Bomb Alley | 1983 | Turn-based strategy | Proprietary | Proprietary | Strategic Simulations / Gary Grigsby | The game used the same engine used by Grigsby's previous Guadalcanal Campaign, which was coded and distributed as uncompiled Applesoft BASIC. |
| Diamond Trust of London | 2012 | TBS | Public domain software | Public domain | Jason Rohrer | Following a Kickstarter crowdfunding campaign Diamond Trust of London was developed by Jason Rohrer and published by indiePub. On 28 August 2012, it was released for the Nintendo DS. The game has been placed in the public domain, hosted on SourceForge, like most of Rohrer's games. |
| DONKEY.BAS | 1981 | Racing game | Proprietary | Proprietary | Bill Gates, Neil Konzen | Was written by Microsoft co-founder Bill Gates and Neil Konzen in 1981 and was included with early versions of the PC DOS operating system for the original IBM PC. Similar early BASIC games which were distributed as source code are GORILLA.BAS and NIBBLES.BAS. |
| Doom Classic | 2009 | First-person shooter | GPLv2+ | Proprietary | id Software | Source code of the iOS port released in November 2009 as it is based on the PrBoom source port. |
| ELIZA (DOCTOR) | 1966 | Chatbot / Rogerian psychotherapist simulator | Public domain software / CC0 | Public domain | Joseph Weizenbaum | ELIZA is an influential video game predecessor written at the MIT Artificial Intelligence Laboratory by Joseph Weizenbaum between 1964 and 1966. Weizenbaum's original MAD-SLIP implementation was re-written in Lisp by Bernie Cosell. A BASIC version appeared in Creative Computing in 1977, written in 1973 by Jeff Shrager. This version, which was ported to many of the earliest personal computers, appears to have been subsequently translated into many other versions in many other languages. On 28 May 2021, the original MAD-Slip source code for ELIZA was discovered and released under the CC0 free-software license with permission of Weizenbaum's estate. |
| Frogatto & Friends | 2010 | Platform | Zlib license / CC BY 3.0 | Proprietary | Lost Pixel | The game was developed open-source on GitHub with an own open-source game engine by several The Battle for Wesnoth developers and released in July 2010 for several platforms. The game was for purchase on the MacOS' app store, iPhone App Store and BlackBerry App World as the game assets were kept proprietary. |
| HyperRogue | 2011 | Roguelike | GPLv2+ | Proprietary | Zeno Rogue | Released in 2011 on GitHub as open-source non-Euclidean roguelike, it was commercialized in 2015 on Steam and other distributors. |
| Ion Fury | 2019 | First-person shooter | GNU General Public License | Proprietary | Voidpoint | Ion Fury is based on the EDuke32 source port of Duke Nukem 3D, which is under the GNU General Public License. It is possible to compile Ion Fury by downloading the latest version of EDuke32 and compile it with the flag FURY set to 1. |
| Jagged Alliance 2 Wildfire (now JA2-Stracciatella) | 2004 | Tactical role-playing game | Own license | Proprietary | iDeal Games | Source code was bundled and released with JA2: Wildfire 2004. The JA: Unfinished Business source code became later available too. |
| Limit Theory | 2018 (canceled)/2022 | Real-time strategy | Unlicense | Unlicense | Procedural Reality | Source code released to the public due to the cancelation of the title. |
| One Hour One Life | 2018 | Multiplayer survival game | Public domain software | Public domain | Jason Rohrer | Released February 2018 and exclusively sold via the developer's webpage. Like the games before, public domain software and hosted on GitHub. |
| Pitman | 1985 | Puzzle game | Proprietary | Proprietary | Yutaka Isokawa | Originally created in 1985 on a MZ-700 home computer by Yutaka Isokawa. The BASIC listing was published in the August 1985 issue of the magazine "Oh!MZ Publications". In 1990 the game was commercially converted for the Game Boy. In 2011, the game community restored a faithful as possible version from the available variants. |
| Pixel Dungeon | 2014 | roguelike | GPLv3+ | Freeware/Commercial | watabou | Available commercially on Steam, while the Android release source code and original itch.io release are available for free. |
| Receiver | 2012 | FPS / stealth game | own non-commercial conditions | Proprietary | Wolfire games | The source code of the game is available since 2012 on GitHub under non-commercial conditions. |
| Santa Paravia en Fiumaccio | 1978 | turn-based strategy | Public domain software | Public domain | George Blank | The game by George Blank first appeared in the December 1978 issue of SoftSide magazine as BASIC listing. It was published for sale on tape cassette as a computer game by Instant Software for the Radio Shack TRS-80, the Apple II, TI-99/4A, and PET. It has been translated into many programming languages, such as ANSI C, and has been ported to the Palm Pilot. |
| Skin Deep | 2025 | First-person shooter | GPLv3+ | Proprietary | Blendo Games | Game source released on 26 June 2025, as it is based on the Dhewm3 source port. |
| Softporn Adventure | 1981 | Text adventure | Proprietary | Freeware | Chuck Benton / On-Line Systems | A comedic, adult-oriented text adventure game produced for the Apple II in 1981. Softporn Adventure was originally written and released for the Apple II as Applesoft BASIC source code in 1981 by programmer Chuck Benton. The game was released by On-Line Systems and became later the base for Leisure Suit Larry 1. The PC version was also released later as freeware by Al Lowe. |
| Strife: Veteran Edition (Strife remaster) | 2014 | FPS | GPLv2+ | Proprietary | Samuel Villarreal / Night Dive Studios | In December 2014, Night Dive Studios coordinated the re-release of the 1996 first-person shooter role playing hybrid game Strife as Strife: Veteran Edition, after acquiring rights to the game. Because the game's source code had been lost, a derivative of the Chocolate Doom subproject Chocolate Strife was used as the game's engine, with its original programmers being contracted to do additional coding for the re-release. The source code of Strife: Veteran Edition has been made available under GPLv3 on GitHub by Samuel Villarreal and Night Dive Studios on 12 December 2014. While this was the first source code opened for a Night Dive Studios Studio's game, it was announced more will follow, for instance for System Shock 1. |
| Quadrilateral Cowboy | 2016 | Puzzle video game | GPLv3+ | Proprietary | Blendo Games | Game source released on 8 August 2016, as it is based on the iodoom3 source port. |
| Telengard | 1982 | Dungeon crawler, role-playing, roguelike | Proprietary | Proprietary | Avalon Hill / Daniel Lawrence | As the game's BASIC source code ("DSKTEL.BAS") was available early on, ports and remaster exist therefore by the community. |
| The Castle Doctrine | 2014 | MMO | Public domain software | Public domain | Jason Rohrer | The Castle Doctrine is developed by Jason Rohrer in a public SourceForge repository and is like most of his creative works in the public domain. The Castle Doctrine was developed as an early access game and is now sold on Steam. |
| The Oregon Trail | 1975 | Role-playing video game | Public domain (?) | Public domain (?) | Don Rawitsch / MECC | First publicly released in 1975 in BASIC, as was the updated 1978 version which was more widely published in Creative Computing, May/June 1978. Source rediscovered in 2011. |
| The Prisoner | 1980 | adventure game | Proprietary | Proprietary | Edu-Ware / David Mullich | Developed in BASIC for the Apple II the source code was available with the release. Source code is hosted on GitHub. |
| Thirty Flights of Loving | 2012 | Adventure game | GPLv2+ | Proprietary | Blendo Games | Game source released in August 2012 as it is based on the KMQuake II source port. |
| Tokyo Friend Park 2 Ketteiban: Minna de Challenge! Taikan Attraction | 2009 | Party | Proprietary | Proprietary | Art | Game source included on the disc, in addition to a screenshot program written for Nintendo of America included with the Wii's SDK. Does not include Art's system libraries. As most DVD readers cannot read Wii discs, and the source itself cannot be accessed without a homebrewed console, it is unclear if the code's release was intentional. |
| Vulture for Nethack | 1987 | rogue-like | NetHack General Public License | Freeware / Commercial | NetHack community / Jaakko Peltonen / Clive Crous | Falcon's Eye was developed by Jaakko Peltonen as graphical version of NetHack. After 2001 development had ended, Clive Crous continued Falcon's Eye as Vulture's Eye. While still being Free and open-source software the game is commercialized via the author's website and Desura. In October 2013 the game was put into the Steam Greenlight process and successfully released on Steam in January 2016. |
| Wargroove | 2019 | Turn-based tactics | Apache-2.0 | Proprietary | Chucklefish | Halley, the custom engine made for Wargroove, has been available on GitHub to the public at least since 2018. |
| Wolfenstein 3D Classic Platinum | 2009 | First-person shooter | GPLv2+ | Proprietary | id Software | Source code of the iOS port released in March 2009 as it is based on the Wolfenstein 3-D Redux source port. |
| Wrath: Aeon of Ruin | 2019 (early access) | First-person shooter | GPLv2+ | Proprietary | KillPixel | Being released in November 2019 as early access game, based on the DarkPlaces engine, the game's source code was also released on GitHub. |

== Games with available source code ==
The table below with available source code resulted not from official releases by companies or IP holders but from unclear release situations, like lost and found games, and leaks of unclear legality (e.g. by an individual developer on end-of-product-life) or undeleted content.

| Title | Original release | Source code found or leaked | System | Genre | Original developer | Additional information |
|---|---|---|---|---|---|---|
| 360: Three Sixty | 1999 | 2020 | PlayStation | Racing | Smart Dog | The PlayStation source code can be found in a dummy file on the disc. |
| Actua Soccer 96 | 1996 | 1996 | MS-DOS | Sports | Gremlin Interactive | A demo CD that shipped with a game magazine accidentally contained the C++ source code of the game. |
| Adventure in Time | 1981 | 2016 | Atari 8-bit/Apple II | Adventure game | Phoenix Software | In November 2016 the source code for the Atari 8-bit and Apple II versions of Adventure in Time and Birth of the Phoenix were released by Kevin Savetz, along with partial code of The Queen of Phobos for Apple II. |
| Age of Pirates: Captain Blood | 2010 | 2022 | Windows | Action-adventure game/Hack and slash | 1C: Seawolf Studio | Source code of game engine was released on GitHub under GPLv3 on 28 November 2022. |
| Age of Pirates 2: City of Abandoned Ships | 2009 | 2021 | Windows | Role-playing game | Akella | Source code of Storm Engine released on GitHub under GPLv3 in a 2021 and support Sea Dogs: To Each His Own and Age of Pirates 2: City of Abandoned Ships. |
| Airforce Delta | 2000 | 2020 | Game Boy Color | Flight simulator | Climax Studios | Source code of the Game Boy Color version was leaked on 4chan in May 2020. |
| Aliens versus Predator 2 | 2001 | 2002 | Windows | FPS | Monolith Productions | Source code released on the Monolith Productions FTP server in 2002, then quickly taken down. |
| Area 51 | 2005 | 2024 | PlayStation 2, Xbox | FPS | Midway Studios Austin | Final source code for the game was leaked on GitHub by Andrew Sampson on 7 March 2024. |
| Asteroids | 1979 | 1996 | Atari 7800 | Arcade | Atari | Source code of Asteroids in the Atari 7800 version was released in physical form by Atari Sunnyvale on their closure 1996. Together with Ms. Pac-Man, Dig Dug, Robotron: 2084 and eight further games reconstructed by the Atari-Museum and published later. Ports for modern FPGAs were made later. |
| Army Men | 1998 | 2022 | Windows | Real-time tactics | The 3DO Company | Source code for the Windows version was uploaded to archive.org in 2022. |
| Art of Fighting | 1992 | 2014 | Neo Geo | Fighting | SNK | The source code was found on an NEC PC-9821 used for developing Neo Geo titles in 2014. |
| Aztec | 1982 | 2019 | Atari 8-bit | Action-adventure | Datamost | In January 2019 Jason Scott uploaded the source code of this game to the Internet Archive. |
| Battle Konchuuden | 1999 | 2019 | PlayStation | Role-playing game | Jaleco Entertainment | A zip file was found within the retail games dummy data, which included the full PlayStation source code to the game. |
| Beatmania 5th Mix | 1999 | 2000 | PlayStation | Music video game | Konami | With the 2000 Japanese PSX game Beatmania Best Hits there was mistakenly included the source code for the 1999 game Beatmania 5th Mix. |
| The Bilestoad | 1982 | 2019 | Apple II | Action-adventure | Datamost | In January 2019 Jason Scott uploaded the source code of this game to the Internet Archive. |
| The Black Cauldron | 1985 | 2022 | MS-DOS | Adventure | Sierra Entertainment | During 25–27 October 2022, Jason Scott uploaded to GitHub 13 repositories containing source code for a variety of video games. |
| Blood | 1997 | 2000–2010, 2023 | MS-DOS | FPS | QStudios / Monolith Productions | In 2000, partial source code of an alpha version was leaked. In 2010, the complete alpha source code was leaked. Using the code as reference, a reverse engineered build of the final version was created by Alexander Makarov for source ports around 2017. A later alpha draft from July 1996 was leaked in January 2023 by "x0r_jmp". |
| Blood & Magic | 1996 | 2021 | MS-DOS | Real-time strategy | Tachyon Studios | Source code was uploaded to archive.org in 2021. |
| B.O.B. / Space Funky B.O.B. | 1993 | 2008 | SNES | Side-scrolling game | Electronic Arts | On 12 September 2008, the source code of the SNES version became available as it was found on an eBay-bought hard drive. |
| Buck Rogers: Planet of Zoom | 1983 | 2018 | Atari 8-bit | Rail shooter | Sega | On 17 May 2018, Kevin Savetz uploaded scans of the complete source code of the Atari 8-bit conversion of Buck Rogers: Planet of Zoom donated by Charlie Kulas. |
| California Watersports | 2001 | 2020 | PlayStation | Sports | Theyer GFX | The PlayStation source code was released in 2020 with the permission of developer Mark Theyer. |
| Captain Comic | 1988 | 2012 | NES | Platformer | Michael Denio | In September 2012 the source code of the NES version was offered on eBay. |
| Chicken Run | 2000 | 2011, 2024 | Dreamcast, Game Boy Color | Stealth game | Blitz Games | In May 2011, the Sega Dreamcast source code became available, found by a collector on a Dreamcast Dev Kit's harddrive. On 14 January 2024, the Game Boy Color source code was released on archive.org. |
| Chill | 1998 | 2020 | PlayStation | Sports | Silicon Dreams | A zip file was found within the retail game's dummy data, which included the full PlayStation 1 source code to the game. |
| Columns | 1990 | 2010 | Game Gear | Puzzle game | Sega | Game Gear version source code was found in 2006 and released in 2010. |
| Counter-Strike: Global Offensive | 2012 | 2020 | Windows | First-person shooter | Valve | A 2017 version of the game's source code was leaked on 4chan in 2020. |
| Cruis'n USA | 1994 | 2021 | Arcade | Racing game | Midway Games | Uploaded by Jason Scott to GitHub on 6 April 2021. |
| Crysis | 2007 | 2026 | Windows, Xbox 360, PlayStation 3 | First-person shooter | Crytek | Source code for Crysis 1, Crysis Warhead and Crysis Wars was released on a web forum in January 2026. The contents were later made available on the Internet Archive. |
| Crysis 2 | 2011 | 2022 | Windows, Xbox 360, PlayStation 3 | First-person shooter | Crytek | Source code was released on a web forum in August 2022, before being reuploaded to Internet Archive in 2023. |
| Crysis 3 | 2013 | 2024 | Windows | First-person shooter | Crytek | Passworded source code was released by a ransomware group in 2020, but went largely unnoticed until 2024 when the password was discovered and made available on archive.org. |
| Cybermorph | 1993 | 2014 | Atari Jaguar | Graphic adventure | Attention to Detail | Source released in 2014 on atariage.com. |
| Cyberpunk 2077 | 2020 | 2021 | Windows | Role-playing game | CD Projekt Red | Source code obtained in a 2021 ransomware attack against CD, and later leaked online. |
| Dark Chambers | 1988 | 2008 | Atari 2600 | Dungeon crawl | Atari Corporation | The source code for the Atari 2600 version of Dark Chambers was uploaded to AtariAge by Curt Vendel on 9 February 2008. |
| Dark Engine (Thief, Thief II, System Shock 2) | 1998 | 2009–2010 | Windows | Stealth game | Looking Glass Studios | In 2009, a complete copy of the Dark Engine source code was discovered in the possession of an ex-Looking Glass Studios employee who was at the time continuing his work for Eidos Interactive. In late April 2010, a user on the Dreamcast Talk forum disassembled the contents of a Dreamcast development kit he had purchased. Later, significant updates for the Dark Engine-based games were published. |
| Dark Reign 2 | 2000 | 2011 | Windows | RTS | Pandemic Studios | Released by a former developer of Pandemic Studios under LGPL. Legal status unclear. |
| Defender | 1981 | 2021 | Arcade | Scrolling shooter | Williams Electronics | On 7 January 2021, Jason Scott uploaded to GitHub the source code for the original arcade version of Defender. |
| Desert Falcon | 1987 | 2008 | Atari 2600 | Scrolling shooter | General Computer Corporation | The source code for the Atari 2600 version of Desert Falcon was uploaded to AtariAge by Curt Vendel on 9 February 2008. |
| Devil May Cry 2 | 2003 | 2020 | Various | Hack and slash | Capcom | Source code was obtained in a 2020 ransomware attack against Capcom. |
| Donald Duck's Playground | 1986 | 2022 | MS-DOS | Adventure | Sierra Entertainment | During 25–27 October 2022, Jason Scott uploaded to GitHub 13 repositories containing source code for a variety of video games. |
| Donkey Kong | 1981 | 2008 | Atari 8-bit | Platform | Nintendo | In August 2008 the 6502 assembly language source code of Donkey Kong was published at the AtariAge forum by Curt Vendel, and was discussed there by the original developer, Landon Dyer. |
| Doom | 1993 | 2023, 2024 | Macintosh, DOS, SNES | First-person shooter | id Software | Doom's Macintosh and DOS source code appeared on eBay in two different lots, and once purchased later found its contents online: the first on 19 September 2023 and the second on 19 March 2024. Amiga floppy disks containing the SNES source code were released on archive.org on 5 June 2024. |
| Double Dragon II: The Revenge | 1989 | 2013 | MS-DOS | Beat em up | Technōs Japan | In 2013 the Internet Archive put the undeleted assembly sources (DRGNSRC.LZH) of the DOS version for download. |
| Dragon Rage | 2001 | 2001 | PlayStation 2 | Shooter | The 3DO Company | Source code hidden inside a dummy file in the PlayStation 2 version of Jonny Moseley Mad Trix. |
| Duke Nukem Forever (alpha version only) | 2001 | 2022 | Windows | First-person shooter | 3D Realms | Source code to an alpha version of the game, dated 26 October 2001, was leaked on 10 May 2022 |
| Empire | 1977 | 197? | FORTRAN/PDP-10 | turn-based wargame | Walter Bright | At some point, someone broke through the security systems at Caltech, and took a copy of the source code for the FORTRAN/PDP-10 version of the game. This code was continually modified, being passed around from person to person and ported to other system e.g. to VAX/VMS OS. |
| Eve Online | 2003 | 2011 | Windows | Space strategy MMO | CCP Games | On 20 May 2011, someone released the EVE Online source code on a GitHub repository. After the source code was online four days, CCP issued a DMCA take-down request which was followed by GitHub. |
| Extreme-G 3 | 2001 | 2015 | PlayStation 2 | Racing game | Acclaim Cheltenham | The source code came into hands of a community member by unknown means around 2015. |
| Eye of the Beholder II: The Legend of Darkmoon | 1991 | 2021 | MS-DOS | Role-playing game | Westwood Associates | The source code was released on archive.org in 2021. |
| Falcon 4.0 | 1998 | 2000 | Windows | Combat flight simulator | MicroProse | A 2000 source code leak by a former developer allowed unofficial community development, including upgrades, improved graphics, and bug fixes. In 2013 the source code of one of the community development branches was released to a GitHub repository under a questionable BSD license. |
| Fall Guys: Ultimate Knockout | 2020 | 2021 | Windows | Battle royale game | Mediatonic | Intermediate C++ source code (transpiled from C# with Unity's IL2CPP compiler) accidentally included with a 2021 update. |
| Fate | 2005 | 2015 | Windows | Action RPG | WildTangent | Inadvertently made available when Fate and its sequel Fate: Undiscovered Realms were offered through a May 2015 Humble Bundle. The download link provided to purchasers for the DRM-Free copy lead to an apparently current dump of the source code. This was available for several days before it was corrected. |
| Far Cry | 2004 | 2023 | Various | First-person shooter | Crytek | The source code was released on archive.org in 2023. |
| Football Director DS | 2008 | 2024 | Nintendo DS | Sports | Sports Director Limited | The source code was released on GitHub in 2024 by its designer and programmer Roger Womack. |
| The F.A. Premier League Stars | 2000 | 2016 | Windows | Sports | Electronic Arts | Source code found in a Windows prototype build. |
| FIFA 97 | 1996 | 1996 | Windows | Sports | Electronic Arts | Around 1996 Electronic Arts accidentally put the game's source code on a demo disc. |
| FIFA 21 | 2020 | 2021 | Various | Sports | Electronic Arts | In 2021, hackers leaked 751 GB of data relating to the development of FIFA 21, including source code, assets, and the Frostbite game engine. |
| Forsaken | 1998 | 2007 | Windows | 6DOF shooter | Probe Entertainment | In 2007, nine years after the first release, the source code became available to the public. The game's community took up the game and kept updating and porting the game via a GitHub repository under a GPL license. |
| Friday the 13th: The Game | 2017 | 2021 | Various | Survival horror | IIIFonic, Black Tower Studios | Partial Unreal Engine project leaked via Google Drive on 2 December 2021. |
| Frogger (1997) | 1997 | 2023 | PlayStation, Windows | Action | SCE Studio Cambridge | PlayStation and Windows source code leaked on 4chan on 27 September 2023. |
| Frogger (Game.com) | 1999 | 2011 | Game.com | Action | Hasbro Interactive | Source code included with Game.com official emulator. |
| Frogger 2: Swampy's Revenge | 2000 | 2025 | PlayStation, Windows, Dreamcast, Game Boy Color, Nintendo 64 | Action | Blitz Games | Full development archives released in 2025. |
| Gears of War | 2006 | Unknown | Xbox 360 Windows | Third-person shooter | Epic Games | While the exact date and source of the leak isn't commonly known, There are two versions of leaked source code for gears of war 1, both of which contain a playable build while only one contains uncompiled map sources in addition to the build and source code. The first version is just a 2006 English build with Xbox 360 controller icons in-place of pc one's. And the other version is a 2007 Chinese localized build with regular pc mouse and keyboard icons. |
| Glover | 1999 | 2024 | PlayStation | Platformer | Blitz Games | On 14 January 2024, the PlayStation source code and numerous builds were uploaded by Codebound to the Internet Archive. |
| Grand Theft Auto V | 2013 | 2023 | Windows | Action-adventure | Rockstar North | Source code obtained as part of the September 2022 Grand Theft Auto VI leaks. Released publicly on 25 December 2023, as a form of protest against the sentencing of the perpetrator of the leaks. |
| Guilty Gear Strive | 2021 | 2025 | Xbox One, PlayStation 4, Windows | Fighting | Arc System Works | During May 2025 several prototype builds of the game leaked, eventually followed by a 122GB archive of the games source code being made available on torrent trackers. |
| GunZ: The Duel | 2005 | 2011 | Windows | Third-person shooter | MAIET Entertainment | In 2011 the source code of GunZ 1.5 became available online. |
| Gwent: The Witcher Card Game | 2018 | 2021 | Windows | Collectible card game | CD Projekt Red | Source code obtained in a 2021 ransomware attack against CD Projekt Red, and was leaked to 4chan on 9 February 2021. |
| Hägar the Horrible | 1992 | 2021 | Commodore 64 | Platform | Kingsoft | Source code for the Commodore 64 version was uploaded to archive.org in 2021. |
| Half-Life 2 | 2004 | 2003 | Windows | FPS | Valve | An alpha version of Half-Life 2's source code was leaked in 2003, a year before the game's release. A complete snapshot of the game from 2017 also became public in the 2020 Source Engine leak. |
| Halo Wars | 2009 | 2021 | Xbox 360 | RTS | Ensemble Studios | Source code for a prototype version dated 3 months before the games release was leaked in 2021. |
| Hard Drivin' | 1989 | 2024 | Atari ST | Sim racing | Tengen | On 25 January 2024, the source code for the Atari ST conversion of Hard Drivin', the Sega Genesis conversion of RoadBlasters and the Sega Genesis version of R.B.I. Baseball '94 was uploaded to the Internet Archive. |
| Harry Potter and the Chamber of Secrets | 2002 | 2020 | Windows | Action-adventure | KnowWonder | Source code from a prototype version was leaked in 2020. |
| Heavenly Sword | 2007 | 2016 | PlayStation 3 | Action-adventure | Ninja Theory | Leaked in a 2008 Sony devnet breach, code was later publicly posted online in 2016, and partially reuploaded to GitHub in 2019. |
| Hexen: Beyond Heretic | 1995 | 2024 | MS-DOS | First-person shooter | id Software | On a CD-ROM containing Doom's Macintosh source code that appeared on eBay was also some of the original DOS source code for Hexen. Once purchased, it later found its contents online on 19 March 2024. |
| Hexen: Beyond Heretic | 1995 | 2024 | Macintosh | First-person shooter | id Software | A CD-ROM containing Hexen's Macintosh source code was sold on ebay on 6 Oct 2024. Its contents have not yet been found online. |
| Home Alone 2: Lost in New York | 1992 | 2016 | NES | Action | Imagineering | Game source released of the NES game in 2016 by Frank Cifaldi after finding it on an old hard drive. |
| Hulk | 2003 | 2021 | Various | Action | Radical Entertainment | Source code released on 4chan on 22 August 2021. |
| Jimmy Neutron vs. Jimmy Negatron | 2002 | 2022 | Game Boy Advance | Action | Human Soft | Source code, artwork and builds from the Game Boy Advance version were anonymously leaked on 4chan on 8 November 2022. Among these are various character models and assets used in the production of the film Jimmy Neutron: Boy Genius. |
| Joust | 1982 | 2021 | Arcade | Action | Williams Electronics | On 7 January 2021, Jason Scott uploaded to GitHub the source code for the original arcade version of Joust. |
| Kelly Slater's Pro Surfer | 2002 | 2021 | PlayStation 2 | Sports | Treyarch | Source code found in a ZIP file in a prototype version of the PlayStation 2 version. |
| Killer7 | 2005 | 2016 | GameCube | Action-adventure game | Grasshopper Manufacture | Sources and assets from the GameCube game were found in October 2016 on an open webserver. |
| King's Quest III | 1986 | 2022 | MS-DOS | Adventure | Sierra Entertainment | During 25–27 October 2022, Jason Scott uploaded to GitHub 13 repositories containing source code for a variety of video games. |
| Lethal Enforcers I & II | 1997 | 1997 | PlayStation | Rail shooter | Konami | Source code hidden inside a dummy file. |
| Leisure Suit Larry in the Land of the Lounge Lizards | 1987 | 2022 | MS-DOS | Adventure | Sierra Entertainment | During 25–27 October 2022, Jason Scott uploaded to GitHub 13 repositories containing source code for a variety of video games. Both the original and the VGA remake were included. |
| Leisure Suit Larry Goes Looking for Love (in Several Wrong Places) | 1988 | 2022 | MS-DOS | Adventure | Sierra Entertainment | During 25–27 October 2022, Jason Scott uploaded to GitHub 13 repositories containing source code for a variety of video games. Both the original and the VGA remake were included. |
| Leisure Suit Larry III: Passionate Patti in Pursuit of the Pulsating Pectorals | 1989 | 2022 | MS-DOS | Adventure | Sierra Entertainment | During 25–27 October 2022, Jason Scott uploaded to GitHub 13 repositories containing source code for a variety of video games. |
| Leisure Suit Larry 5: Passionate Patti Does a Little Undercover Work | 1991 | 2022 | DOS | Adventure | Sierra Entertainment | During 25–27 October 2022, Jason Scott uploaded to GitHub 13 repositories containing source code for a variety of video games. |
| Lineage II | 2003 | 2003 | Windows | MMORPG | NCSOFT | In 2003 a Chinese Hacker acquired the Lineage II source code, and sold it to someone who set up alternative servers. Shutdown by FBI in 2007. |
| Mad Planets | 1983 | 2021 | Arcade | Multidirectional shooter | Gottlieb | Uploaded to the Internet Archive by Jason Scott on 20 May 2021. |
| Manic Miner | 2002 | 2022 | Game Boy Advance | Platformer | Jester Interactive | Released on 20 February 2022, by Forest of Illusion. |
| Metal Arms: Glitch in the System | 2003 | 2019 | GameCube | Third-person shooter | Sierra Entertainment | Uploaded to archive.org in 2019. |
| Metal Gear Solid 2: Sons of Liberty (HD version) | 2011 | 2026 | Various | Action-adventure | Kojima Productions / Bluepoint Games | On 30 April 2026, the source code was leaked on 4chan. |
| Metin 2 | 2004 | ? | Windows | MMORPG | Ymir Entertainment | The source of the leak is unknown for certain, it is said that an ex employee at Ymir Entertainment leaked the source code for revenge after he was fired. |
| Microsoft Entertainment Pack | 1996 | 2004 | Windows | Casual game | Microsoft | In the copies of Windows NT 4.0 and Windows 2000 source code which leaked back in 2004, there are 32-bit versions of Cruel, Golf, Pegged, Reversi, Snake (Rattler Race), Taipei and TicTactics. |
| Minecraft: PlayStation 3 Edition | 2013 | 2026 | PlayStation 3 | Sandbox game | 4J Studios | Source code was leaked on 4chan in 2026. |
| The Misadventures of Tron Bonne | 1999 | 2020 | PlayStation | Action-adventure | Capcom | Source code was obtained in a 2020 ransomware attack against Capcom. |
| MoHo | 2000 | 2022 | Dreamcast | Action | Lost Toys | Source code to the Dreamcast version was found and released in 2022. |
| Monopoly | 2000 | 2018 | Windows | Board | Artech Studios | The source code for the Microsoft Windows version of the 2000 video game Monopoly was leaked in August 2018. |
| Mortal Kombat II | 1993 | 2022 | Arcade | Fighting | Midway Games | During 25–27 October 2022, Jason Scott uploaded to GitHub 13 repositories containing source code for a variety of video games, including the arcade version of Mortal Kombat II. |
| Mortal Kombat 3 | 1994 | 2023 | Arcade | Fighting | Midway Games | In December 2023, Jason Scott uploaded the arcade source of Mortal Kombat 3. |
| Mortal Kombat Trilogy | 1996 | 2018 | Various | Fighting | Midway Games | Game source code for the Nintendo 64 version was leaked anonymously on 4chan, alongside the Windows, PS1, and Arcade source of Mortal Kombat 3. |
| Monsters, Inc. | 2001 | 2019 | PlayStation 2 | Platform | Kodiak Interactive | Source code and artwork for the PlayStation 2 version was uploaded to archive.org in 2019. |
| Mr Nutz 2 | 1994 | 2008 | Amiga | Platformer | Ocean Software | Amiga game, source code prototype associated with Peter Thierolf. |
| Mr. Robot and His Robot Factory | 1983 | 2019 | Apple II | Platform | Datamost | In January 2019 Jason Scott uploaded the source code of this game to the Internet Archive. |
| The Muppets on the Go! | 1996 | 2017 | Sega Pico | Educational | Climax Studios | Source code found on a backup disc, among art assets and more. |
| Myst | 1995 | 2014 | Atari Jaguar | Graphic adventure | Cyan Worlds | Source released in 2014 on atariage.com. |
| Narc | 1988 | 2021 | Arcade | Run and gun | Williams Electronics | Uploaded by Jason Scott to GitHub on 6 April 2021. |
| NBA Jam | 1993 | 2021 | Arcade | Sports video game | Midway Games | On 6 April 2021, Jason Scott uploaded to GitHub the source code for the original arcade version of NBA Jam and NBA Jam: Tournament Edition. |
| NBA Jam Extreme | 1996 | 2017 | Various | Sports | Sculptured Software | In February 2017 the source code was discovered on an archival CD liquidated by Acclaim Entertainment during their bankruptcy sale. It was subsequently sold on eBay for $500. |
| NBA Jam 2001 | 2000 | 2023 | Game Boy Color | Sports | DC Studios | On 7 November 2023, the source code and numerous builds were uploaded by Codebound to the Internet Archive. |
| NBA Hangtime | 1996 | 2021 | Arcade | Sports | Midway Games | Uploaded by Jason Scott to GitHub on 6 April 2021. |
| NFL Blitz 2000 | 1999 | 2023 | Arcade | Sports | Midway Games | During 18–19 October 2023, Jason Scott uploaded to GitHub 7 repositories containing source code for a variety of video games and in-house development utilities, including the arcade version of NFL Blitz 2000 and San Francisco Rush: The Rock. |
| NHL Hockey | 1991 | 2024 | Genesis | Sports | Park Place Productions | On 16 February 2024, the source code was uploaded by Codebound to the Internet Archive. |
| NHL Open Ice | 1996 | 2021 | Arcade | Sports | Midway Games | Uploaded by Jason Scott to GitHub on 6 April 2021. |
| Nickelodeon Party Blast | 2002 | 2020 | Various | Party game | Data Design Interactive | Found a developer's HDD in September 2020, along with many other Data Design Interactive games. |
| Ninety-Nine Nights | 2006 | 2021 | Xbox 360 | Hack and Slash | Q Entertainment | Source code from an unknown point of development was leaked in 2021, later uploaded to archive.org. |
| Ninja Hattori-kun | 1986 | 2019 | Famicom | Platformer | Hudson Soft | Uploaded to GitHub on 24 December 2019. |
| Various Nintendo and Game Freak games | 1990-2024 | 2020-2024 | Various | Various | Various | Throughout 2020, the source code for several games by Nintendo (as well as console and handheld firmware) was leaked by anonymous users on 4chan. These include the first four (and seventh) generations of the Pokémon series and the firmware for the Nintendo 64, GameCube, and 3DS. In 2024, a data leak similar to that of the prior Nintendo data leak occurred, when Game Freak was breached for more Pokémon games. See Nintendo data leak for more information. |
| Oni | 2001 | 2021 | Various | Third-person shooter | Bungie | On 29 April 2021, an unknown source uploaded the source code to the Internet Archive. |
| Outlaw Golf | 2002 | 2021 | Various | Golf | Hypnotix | On 2 January 2021, Forest of Illusion uploaded a .zip file recovered from a hard drive of Data Design Interactive containing the entire source code for the Windows, Xbox and GameCube versions of the game. |
| Pac-Man | 1982 | 2019 | Atari 8-bit | Maze | Roklan | In August 2019 the source code for the Atari 8-bit version was released by Kevin Savetz. |
| Pachinko Dream | 1996 | 1996 | PlayStation | Pachinko | Konami | Source code found inside a dummy file. |
| Pesterminator: The Western Exterminator | 1990 | 2019 | NES | side-scrolling | Color Dreams | In November 2019 the NES source code was uploaded to the Internet Archive. |
| Pinball Fantasies | 1994 | 2020 | DOS | Pinball | FrontLine Design | On 20 December 2020, Jason Scott uploaded to GitHub the source code for the DOS port of Pinball Fantasies. |
| Pocket Music | 2002 | 2022 | Game Boy Color | Music | Jester Interactive | Released on 23 February 2022, by Forest of Illusion. |
| Pole Position | 1983 | 2009 | Atari 2600 | Racing | General Computer Corporation | On 20 May 2009, Curt Vendel released the source code of the Atari 2600 conversion of Pole Position. |
| Police Quest: In Pursuit of the Death Angel | 1987 | 2022 | DOS | Adventure | Sierra Entertainment | During 25–27 October 2022, Jason Scott uploaded to GitHub 13 repositories containing source code for a variety of video games. |
| Postal III | 2011 | 2020 | Windows | First-person shooter | Running with Scissors | Leaked onto 4chan in June 2020, and contains pre-release Half-Life 2 and Team Fortress 2 content. |
| Ragnarok Online 2 | 2007 | 2014 | Windows | MMORPG | Gravity | Posted on a forum found through unknown means. |
| Raid 2020 | 1989 | 2019 | Atari 2600 | Side-scrolling action game | Color Dreams | Source code was found on a floppy disk and uploaded to archive.org in 2019. |
| Rat Attack! | 1998 | 2024 | PlayStation | Puzzle | Pure Entertainment | PlayStation source code obtained from a developer. |
| Rayman Raving Rabbids (prototype only) | 2006 | 2022 | Windows | Party game | Ubisoft | Source code of an alpha platformer build of Rayman Raving Rabbids was obtained through unknown means and released on 12 December 2022. It also contains the tools and the source code from Ubisoft's Jade Engine. |
| Rayman 2: The Great Escape | 1999 | 2022 | Nintendo DS | Platformer | Ubisoft | Source code for Nintendo DS version was obtained through unknown means and released on 3 February 2022. It also contains assets from the Nintendo 64 version of Donald Duck: Goin' Quackers. |
| Re-Volt | 1999 | 200? | Windows | Racing game | Acclaim Studios London | Members of the fan-base have acquired the source code of the game around 2004, which was leaked from an anonymous developer who worked on the Xbox Live port. The game community works since then on fan patches and source ports to new platforms like Linux, MacOS and OpenPandora. |
| Resident Evil: The Umbrella Chronicles | 2007 | 2020 | Wii, PlayStation 3 | Rail shooter | Capcom | Source code was obtained in a 2020 ransomware attack against Capcom. |
| Revolution X | 1994 | 2021 | Arcade | Shooting gallery | Midway Games | Uploaded by Jason Scott to GitHub on 6 April 2021. |
| Robotron: 2084 | 1982 | 2021 | Arcade | Multidirectional shooter | Vid Kidz | On 7 January 2021, Jason Scott uploaded to GitHub the source code for the original arcade version of Robotron: 2084. |
| Rolling Thunder | 1987 | 2016 | Amiga | side-scrolling action game | Tiertex Design Studios | The Amiga version became available on a community forum. |
| Saints Row IV | 2013 | 2024 | Windows, PlayStation 3, Xbox 360 | Action-adventure | Volition | On 25 December 2024 a 59GB archive was posted to 4chan, containing the majority of the games source code & third-party libraries. |
| San Francisco Rush: The Rock | | 2023 | Arcade | | Midway Games | During 18–19 October 2023, Jason Scott uploaded to GitHub 7 repositories containing source code for a variety of video games and in-house development utilities, including the arcade version of NFL Blitz 2000 and San Francisco Rush: The Rock (an updated version of San Francisco Rush: Extreme Racing). |
| Silent Hill: Downpour | 2012 | 2024 | PlayStation 3, Xbox 360 | Survival horror | Vatra Games | Source code was uploaded to Internet Archive on 3 September 2024. |
| The Simpsons: Hit & Run | 2003 | 2021 | Various | Racing | Radical Entertainment | Source code obtained from a developer and released on 4chan on 21 August 2021. |
| Sinistar | 1983 | 2021 | Arcade | Multidirectional shooter | Williams Electronics | Uploaded by Jason Scott to GitHub on 6 April 2021. |
| Smash TV | 1990 | 2021 | Arcade | Multidirectional shooter | Williams Electronics | Uploaded by Jason Scott to GitHub on 6 April 2021. |
| Sonic the Hedgehog 2 | 1992 | 2006 | Genesis | Platformer | Sega Technical Institute | A small portion of the game's source code (as well as symbol tables) was found in an early prototype build dated May 1992 that was shown on Nick Arcade, when the prototype was found in 2006. The raw source code most likely refers to the game's edit mode (or "debug mode") feature. |
| Sonic Unleashed (mobile) | 2008 | 2017 | J2ME | Platformer | Gameloft | The J2ME mobile version was uploaded to GitHub in 2017, however it was taken down in 2020. |
| Speedball 2: Brutal Deluxe | 1990 | 2022 | PocketPC / Dreamcast | Sports | The Bitmap Brothers | Source code to the PocketPC and an unreleased Dreamcast port was found and released in 2022. |
| Spider-Man 2 | 2023 | 2023 | PlayStation 5 | Action-adventure | Insomniac Games | Source code leaked as part of a ransomware attack on Insomniac Games in December 2023. |
| Spirit of Speed 1937 | 2000 | 2022 | Dreamcast | Racing game | Broadsword Interactive | Source code to the Dreamcast version was found and released in 2022. |
| SpongeBob SquarePants: SuperSponge | 2001 | 2016 | PlayStation, Game Boy Advance | Platformer | Climax Development | The PlayStation version's development repository was released on GitHub in 2018, converted from an old Microsoft Visual SourceSafe repository. Curiously, it was discovered that the game contained code from the Linux kernel (specifically the vsprintf function, presumably used for debugging), and therefore violates the GNU General Public License. Source code from a very early build of the GBA version was also found. |
| S.T.A.L.K.E.R.: Clear Sky (X-Ray Engine 1.5.10) | 2008 | 2014 | Windows | FPS | GSC Game World | In August 2014 the source code for the game's X-Ray Engine 1.5.10 became available on GitHub under a non-open-source license. The successor's engine, X-ray 1.6.02, became available too. As of October 2019 the xray-16 engine community fork, "OpenXRay", achieved compiling state and support for the two games Call of Pripyat and Clear Sky with build 558. |
| Starbound | 2016 | 2023 | Windows | Sandbox game | Chucklefish | Leaked onto 4chan on 18 June 2023. |
| Stargate | 1981 | 2021 | Arcade | Scrolling shooter | Vid Kidz | On 7 January 2021, Jason Scott uploaded to GitHub the source code for the original arcade version of Stargate. |
| Star Trek: New Worlds | 2000 | 2021 | Windows | Real-time strategy | Binary Asylum | Source code from a prototype build was uploaded to archive.org in 2021. |
| Star Wars | 1983 | 2021 | Arcade | Rail shooter | Atari, Inc. | During 13–16 October 2021, Jason Scott uploaded to GitHub 78 repositories containing source code to several Atari arcade games. Notable games include Tank 8/Ultra Tank, Quiz Show, Dominos, Sprint 2, Night Driver, Starship 1, Drag Race, Triple Hunt, Super Bug, Canyon Bomber, Avalanche, Super Breakout, Destroyer, Fire Truck, Tournament Table, Video Pinball, Football, Indy 4, Asteroids, Lunar Lander, Sky Diver, Missile Command, Red Baron, Asteroids Deluxe, Centipede, Warlords, Tempest, Battlezone, Space Duel, Gravitar, Liberator, Millipede, Quantum, Food Fight, Black Widow and Crystal Castles. |
| Star Wars Galaxies | 2003 | 2014 | Windows | MMO | Sony Online Entertainment | In 2013, a former Sony Online Entertainment employee leaked a copy of the 2010 production source code for the Star Wars Galaxies client, server, 3rd party libraries and development tools to a group of former players. The code was later leaked beyond its intended recipients and made available online. Live, free to play public servers and public development groups have since come into existence. The source code is centrally maintained by the open-source project SWG Source and is available on GitHub. |
| Striker '96 | 1996 | 2022 | PlayStation | Sports | Rage Software | Source code found on a Dreamcast development kit. |
| Super 3D Noah's Ark | 1994 | 2018 | SNES | FPS | Wisdom Tree | In November 2018 the source code for SNES version was bought on eBay and released to the public. |
| Swashbuckler | 1982 | 2019 | Apple II | Fighting | Datamost | In January 2019 Jason Scott uploaded the source code of this game to the Internet Archive. |
| The Lion King | 1994 | 2025 | Game Boy, NES | Platformer | Imagineer | Source code was released on 1 January 2025. |
| Tempest 2000 | 1994 | 2008 | Atari Jaguar | tube shooter | Llamasoft | On 24 August 2008, the source code of Tempest 2000 was released by the defunct Jaguar Sector II website under a CD compilation for Windows titled Jaguar Source Code Collection. |
| Three Dirty Dwarves | 1996 | 2016 | Sega Saturn | Beat 'em up | SegaSoft | Source code found in a prototype build. |
| Toontown Online | 2003 | 2020 | Windows | MMO | Disney Interactive | In 2020, a GitHub user named "satire6" uploaded two repositories containing full source code and assets from a 2010 build of the game. |
| Tomb Raider II | 1997 | 2021 | PlayStation | Action-adventure | Core Design | Source code was released on archive.org in 2021. |
| Tony Hawk's Underground | 2003 | 2016 | Various | Sports | Neversoft | The C++ source code was leaked in February 2016 to GitHub. |
| Total Carnage | 1992 | 2021 | Arcade | Multidirectional shooter | Midway Games | Uploaded by Jason Scott to GitHub on 6 April 2021. |
| Trog | 1990 | 2021 | Arcade | Racing game | Midway Games | Uploaded by Jason Scott to GitHub on 6 April 2021. |
| Turrican III | 1994 | 2008 | Amiga | Run and gun | Factor 5 | Amiga game, source code prototype associated with Peter Thierolf. |
| Turok: Dinosaur Hunter | 1997 | 2017 | Nintendo 64 | First-person shooter | Iguana Entertainment / Acclaim Entertainment | In February 2017 the source code of the N64 version was sold on eBay for $2551.99 on a SGI Silicon Graphics Indy development machine which came from the Acclaim Entertainment liquidation. This source code was later released 26 August 2018, then reuploaded, non-encrypted to 4chan the following day. |
| Trespasser | 1998 | 200? | Windows | Action-adventure, FPS | DreamWorks Interactive | The fan community got the original source code into hand by unknown means and created modifications and unofficial patches with it, the latest DirectX 9 port from 2016 and the development ongoing. |
| Ultima IX: Ascension | 1999 | 2014 | Windows | Role-playing video game | Origin Systems | In November 2014 the Ultima Codex Community was able to acquire the Ultima 9 source code from a former developer for offline archival to prevent permanent loss. |
| Ultimate Mortal Kombat 3 | 1994 | 2009 | PlayStation | Beat'em up | Midway Games | The source code and artwork from the PSX version were recovered from floppies in 2009. |
| Unreal Championship 2 | 2005 | 2020 | Windows | First-person shooter | Epic Games | Leaked to 4chan on 29 July 2020. |
| Up'n Down | 1984 | 2018 | Atari 8-bit | Racing, maze | Sega | On 17 May 2018, Kevin Savetz uploaded scans of the complete source code of the Atari 8-bit conversion of Up'n Down donated by Charlie Kulas. |
| Urban Assault | 1998 | 2016 | Windows | Real-time strategy | TerraTools | Found on eBay. |
| Warcraft II: The Dark Saga | 1997 | 2020 | PlayStation | Real-time strategy | Blizzard Entertainment | Source code for the PlayStation version was uploaded to archive.org. |
| Various WayForward games | 200?-201? | 2024 | Various | Various | WayForward | An anonymous seller obtained and sold the source code from many of WayForward's games, including A Boy and His Blob, Adventure Time: Hey Ice King! Why'd You Steal Our Garbage?!!, American Dragon: Jake Long - Rise of the Huntsclan, Barbie and the Magic of Pegasus, DuckTales: Remastered, Mighty Milky Way, Ping Pals, Sigma Star Saga, SpongeBob SquarePants: Creature from the Krusty Krab, SpongeBob SquarePants: Lights, Camera, Pants!, SpongeBob SquigglePants, The SpongeBob SquarePants Movie, Unfabulous, numerous LeapFrog Didj games and some unreleased titles. |
| Wipeout | 1995 | 2022 | PlayStation, Windows | Racing | Psygnosis | Source code for the PlayStation and Windows versions uploaded by Forest of Illusion. |
| Wipeout Pulse | 2009 | 2018 | PlayStation 2 | Racing game | Sony | The PlayStation 2 version contains source code hidden inside a dummy file. The source code is not for the game itself. |
| Wing Commander series | 1990 | 2011 | Various | Space simulator | Origin Systems | The long lost source code of Wing Commander I was given to the fan-community in August 2011 by a former developer for the purpose of long-time preservation. Later most other parts of the series followed. |
| William Shatner's TekWar | 1995 | 2021 | Windows | First-person shooter | Capstone Software | Released on archive.org in 2021. |
| WWF WrestleMania: The Arcade Game | 1995 | 2021 | Arcade | Fighting | Midway Games | Uploaded by Jason Scott to GitHub on 6 April 2021. |
| The Witcher 3 | 2015 | 2024 | Windows | Role-playing game | CD Projekt Red | In 2021 source code for the original release & an early version of the "next generation" update was sold for ransom online, with a passworded archive made available publicly. The group responsible later resurfaced in 2024 and released the password for the archive. |
| Wizardry III: Legacy of Llylgamyn | 1983 | 2021 | Various | Role-playing game | Sir-Tech | The source code (for Apple) was released on archive.org in 2021. |
| Xbox system software | 2001 | 2020 | Xbox | Video game console operating system | Microsoft | In May 2020, the Xbox operating system source code was leaked. |
| Zork and other Infocom games | 1977 | 2008 | Various | Adventure | Infocom | In 2008 a back-up with the source code of all Infocom's video games appeared from an anonymous Infocom source and was archived by the Internet Archive's Jason Scott. On 5 May 2020, the Massachusetts Institute of Technology uploaded to GitHub the source code for 1977–1978 versions and 1977/1989 binaries of Zork. On 12 February 2018, the source code for the original Z-machine interpreter for TRS-80 Color Computer by Infocom was leaked by Brian Moriarty. On 16 November 2023, the source code for the original Infocom intepreter for a wide variety of platforms was uploaded to GitHub. On 19 November, the source code for the IBM PC interpreter was uploaded by David Fillmore. |

== Games with reconstructed source code ==
Once games, or software in general, become an obsolete product for a company, the tools and source code required to re-create the game are often lost or even actively destroyed and deleted. For instance, with the closure of Atari in Sunnyvale, California, in 1996, the original source code of several milestones of video game history such as Asteroids and Centipede was all thrown out as trash.

When much time and manual work is invested, it is still possible to recover or restore a source code variant which replicates the program's functions accurately from the binary program. Techniques used to accomplish this are decompiling, disassembling, and reverse engineering the binary executable. This approach typically does not result in the exact original source code but rather a divergent version, as a binary program does not contain all of the information originally carried in the source code. For example, comments and function names cannot be restored if the program was compiled without additional debug information.

Using the techniques listed above within a "bottom-up" development methodology process, the re-created source-code of a game is able to replicate the behavior of the original game exactly, often being "clock-cycle accurate", and/or "pixel-per-pixel accurate". This approach is in contrast to that used by game engine recreations, which are often made using a "top-down" development methodology, and which can result in duplicating the general features provided by a game engine, but not necessarily an accurate representation of the original game.

| Title | Original release | Source-code reconstructed | Genre | Original developer | Additional information |
|---|---|---|---|---|---|
| Albion | 1996 (MS-DOS) | 2011 | Adventure | Blue Byte | In 2011, via static recompilation from the original x86 binary executable a port for the ARM architecture of the Pandora handheld was created by fans. The community still updates this recompiled version and released also Windows and Linux builds in 2015, source code available on GitHub under MIT. |
| Animal Crossing | 2001 (GCN) | 2026 | Social simulation | Nintendo EAD | Reverse engineered over the span of one-and-a-half years, the GameCube version was the third GameCube game to have a fully working decompilation, with the code being hosted on GitHub. A work-in-progress decompilation of the Japanese Nintendo 64 version titled Dōbutsu no Mori (Animal Forest) is also in development. |
| Another World | 1991 | 2011 | Platformer | Delphine Software International | In 2011, Fabien Sanglard analysed Another World by reverse engineering and reconstructed, based on an earlier approach, a complete C++ source code variant of the internal virtual machine. |
| Bagman | 1982 | 2010 | Arcade game | Valadon Automation | In 2010, the French programmer Jean-François Fabre reconstructed C source code from the game to port it to modern platforms. |
| Banjo-Kazooie | 1998 (N64) | 2024 | Platformer | Rare | Reverse engineered decompilation of the Nintendo 64 game on GitLab. |
| Bermuda Syndrome | 1995 (Windows) | 2007 | Adventure | Century Interactive | After the end of support for the game, Gregory Montoir reverse engineered in 2007 the game engine and wrote a substitute which allowed the porting of the game to modern platforms, like the OpenPandora handheld. |
| Boulder Dash | 1984 (C64) | 2016 | Arcade game | First Star Software | The C64 version was bit accurate reverse engineered by enthusiasts in month long work in 2016. The group reverse engineered several more games also from this period, like The Castles of Dr. Creep 3, Miner 2049er, Lode Runner, Manic Miner and Beach Head. |
| The Castles of Dr. Creep | 1984 (C64) | 2010 | Platformer | Edward R. Hobbs | Robert Crossfield worked on a faithful engine for the game since 2010. The remake/reconstructed version got released for PC on Steam by Edward R. Hobbs & Robert Crossfield in September 2016. |
| Call of Duty 4: Modern Warfare | 2007 | 2025 | First-person shooter | Infinity Ward | In 2025, a group called SwagSoftware decompiled Call of Duty 4, using PDB files and other resources. |
| Call of Duty: Black Ops | 2010 | 2026 | First-person shooter | Treyarch | In 2026, following Call of Duty 4's decompilation, SwagSoftware decompiled Black Ops, using PDB files and other resources. |
| Cannon Fodder | 1993 (MS-DOS) | 2015 | Shoot 'em up | Sensible Software | In December 2015, Robert Crossfield released version 1.0 of the reverse engineered DOS CD Cannon Fodder version, under the name "OpenFodder" on GitHub under GPL. |
| Castlevania: Symphony of the Night | 1997 (PS) | 2022 (ongoing) | Action role-playing, Metroidvania | Konami | A in-progress decompilation, with around 65% of the game decompiled as of 2026, licensed under AGPLv3. |
| Chasm: The Rift | 1997 (MS-DOS) | 2016 | FPS | Action Forms | Around 2016 a reverse engineered version became available on GitHub. |
| Chris Sawyer's Locomotion | 2004 (Windows) | 2018 | Business simulation game | Chris Sawyer | In January 2018, a project to reverse engineer Chris Sawyer's Locomotion into platform independent C++ source code was started under the name OpenLoco. The source code is hosted on Github as open-source software under an MIT License and requires the original game for graphical and sound assets. In September 2025, reimplementation of the game's source code was completed. |
| Citadel | 1985 (BBC) | 2018 | Action-adventure | Superior Software | Buildable, reverse engineered assembler source for the BBC Microcomputer Model B version of the game was released on the Stardot forums in October 2018, by a user known as Diminished. |
| Commander Keen 4-6 | 1991 (MS-DOS) | 2021 | Platformer | id Software | In 2017 a pixel-accuracy aiming engine re-implementation, based on several disassembly/decompilation efforts, became available by David Gow. C99 source code is hosted on GitHub under GPLv2. Originally only meant for Keen 5, it now supports Keen 4, 5 and 6. Between 2019 and 2021 K1n9_Duk3 recreated the source code of Commander Keen 4, 5 and 6, based on the already released source code of Catacomb 3-D, Wolfenstein 3-D and Keen Dreams. When compiled with the Borland C++ v3.0 compiler, compressing the newly created executables with LZEXE 100% identical copies of the original v1.4 executables are achievable. |
| Diablo | 1996 (Windows) | 2018 | Action role-playing game | Blizzard Entertainment | In 2018 a reverse engineered version was released, based on previously accidentally released debug information and builds by Diablo developers. Builds and compiles successfully for modern OSes. |
| Diablo II | 2000 (Windows) | 2015 | Action role-playing game | Blizzard Entertainment | In 2015, an unofficial port for the ARM architecture based Pandora handheld became available by static recompilation and reverse engineering of the original x86 version. |
| Digger | 1983 | 1998 | Arcade | Windmill Software | Reverse engineered by Andrew Jenner in 1998, called Digger Remastered, released as GPL and ported for many platforms. |
| Driver 2 | 2000 (PS) | 2020 | Driving | Reflections Interactive | In 2020 a reverse engineered version was released, based on previously accidentally released debug symbols. |
| Duke Nukem II | 1993 (MS-DOS) | 2022 | Platformer | Apogee Software | In 2022 reconstructed C code was released. |
| Dune II | 1992 (Windows) | 2009 | Real-time strategy game | Westwood Studios | In 2009 a group started reverse engineering Dune II under the name OpenDUNE. The resulting code was released under GPLv2 and ported to other platforms like the Pandora. |
| Dungeon Keeper | 1997 | 2005 | realtime dungeon simulator | Bullfrog Productions | Tomasz Lis reverse engineered a version called KeeperFX, the resulting source code is released as GPLv3. After developer Lis stopped working on KeeperFX around 2016 the community took up the work in 2019 and continues the project as KeeperFX Unofficial. |
| Dungeon Master | 1989 | 2001 | Dungeon crawler | FTL Games | In 2001, Dungeon Master (and its successor CSB) was released by Paul R. Stevens in a portable reverse engineered version called CSBwin. CSBwin was reverse engineered from the game's Atari assembler code to a pure C version in months of work. In 2014 Christophe Fontanel released another reverse engineering project which tries to recreate all existing versions. |
| E.T. the Extra-Terrestrial | 1982 (Atari) | 2006 | Arcade | Atari | In 2006, decompiled by Dennis Debro. Following that, several unofficial fixes for the game were released by a fan site. |
| Elite | 1984 (BBC Micro) | 2003 | Space trading game | Ian Bell, David Braben | Christian Pinder created Elite: The New Kind as faithful PC version by reverse engineering platform-neutral C code from the original BBC Micro version of Elite. This version was withdrawn from the main distribution at David Braben's request in 2003. In September 2014, on Elite's 30th birthday, Ian Bell blessed Elite: The New Kind and re-released it for free on his website. Source code of the 1.0 version is available on a GitHub repository. |
| Escape from Colditz | 1991 (Amiga) | 2009 | Action-adventure | Mike Halsall, John Law / Digital Magic Software. | Around 2009 some developers reconstructed from the Amiga version a C version under GPLv3. Ported then to many systems. |
| Exile | 1988 (BBC Micro) | 2012 | Action-adventure | Peter Irvin, Jeremy Smith | Around 2012 the assembly source code of the BBC Micro version was reconstructed and commented. Later author Peter Irvin blessed also the non-commercial redistribution of the Amiga version of the game. |
| F-15 Strike Eagle II | 1989 (MS-DOS) | 2026 | Flight simulator | MicroProse | The full source code of the game, in a mix of C and assembly has been reconstructed and building to identical opcodes (not fully binary identical), with a separate project started for porting the reconstruction to modern architectures, with bugfixes and improvements. |
| Fatal Frame | 2001 (PS2) | 2026 | Survival horror | Koei Tecmo | The first game of the Fatal Frame series was successfully decompiled in 2026, with 100% of the code being decompiled and matching with the original game. |
| Freeway | 1981 (Atari) | 19?? | Arcade game | Activision | Decompiled and commented by Rebecca Heineman. |
| Football Manager | 1982 | 2001 | Sports, business simulation | Kevin Toms | In 2001 Paul Robson developed an accurate remake of the original game by reverse engineering in C. The remake has since been ported to the GP2X and Google Android. |
| Frontier: Elite 2 | 1993 | 2006 | Space trading game | Frontier Developments | Reverse engineered to C by Tom Morton until 2006. |
| Frontier: First Encounters (Elite III) | 1995 | 2005 | Space trading game | Frontier Developments | Frontier Developments announced in 2000 that FFE would be open-sourced under a GPL-similar license, but this never happened. In response, in October 2005 the game was reverse engineered by John Jordan and builds for modern operation systems were provided. Updated until 1 December 2009, and later continued by other programmers with builds like "FFE_D3D". |
| Final Fantasy VIII | 1999 | 2019 | Role-playing video game | Square Enix | In 2019, Marcin Gomulak rewrote the engine from scratch in C#. |
| Grand Theft Auto III | 2001 (Windows) | 2020 | Action-adventure | DMA Design | Reverse engineered C++ source code, with support for multiple platforms based on GLFW, including the Nintendo Switch. Source code available at GitHub. It was hit with a DMCA takedown on 20 February 2021. |
| Grand Theft Auto: Vice City | 2002 | 2020 | Action-adventure | Rockstar North | Reverse engineering started in early May 2020 and finished in December, being based on the decompiled Grand Theft Auto III code. It was hit with a DMCA takedown on 20 February. |
| Half-Life | 1999 (Windows) | 2013 | FPS | Valve | Since 2002 Valve has released the source code of the game client and the game (server) in its SDK for modder use. The Goldsrc engine and its other components were reverse engineered in context of the Xash3d project. Ports to other systems became available, for instance Android or the OpenPandora. |
| Inner Worlds | 1996 (MS-DOS) | 2016 | Fantasy adventure platformer | Sleepless Software | Originally shareware, in February 2000 the game was released as freeware in version 1.3. Source code reverse engineered around 2016. |
| Igor: Objective Uikokahonia | 1994 (MS-DOS) | 2017 | Point and click adventure | Pendulo Studios | Reverse engineered by Gregory Montoir, now hosted on GitHub, currently beta status. |
| Heart of the Alien | 1994 (Sega CD) | 2004 | Platformer | Interplay Entertainment | After Heart of the Alien became unsupported and unavailable, Gil Megidish took up 2004 the effort of extracting a source code variant from the binary game by reverse engineering to make the game available again on modern platforms. The extracted source code was made open-source and is hosted freely available on SourceForge. |
| Jak and Daxter: The Precursor Legacy | 2001 (PS2) | 2022 | Platformer | Naughty Dog | Naughty Dog coded the first three Jak and Daxter games in GOAL, a modified version of Lisp. A group of programmers created a program that could read and decompile GOAL code, which allowed them to reconstruct the game's source code. While all three Jak games are currently planned, the first has the most work done on it - including a port to modern PCs. |
| Jet Set Willy | 1984 (ZX) | 2014 | Platformer | Software Projects | This classic ZX Spectrum game was disassembled by Richard Dymond back into Z80 source code, and includes some very comprehensive comments. |
| J.R.R. Tolkien's The Lord of the Rings, Vol. I | 1990 (MS-DOS) | 2009 | Adventure | Interplay Entertainment | As the game is without official support for many years, a community developer reverse engineered the game engine and created around 2009 a substitute. The LPGLv2.1+ licensed open-source project allowed the porting to modern platforms, for instance Windows, Linux and the OpenPandora handheld. |
| Kid Chameleon | 1992 (Genesis) | 2018 | Platformer | Sega Technical Institute | Reverse engineered assembly of the Sega Genesis game by Sonic fan site Sonic Retro, hosted on GitHub. |
| KKnD Extreme | 1997 (Windows) | 2017 | Real-time strategy game | Beam Software | Reverse engineered and made available on GitHub by Alexandr Parshin. |
| Knuckles' Chaotix | 1995 (32X) | 2011 | Platformer | Sega, Sonic Team | Reverse engineered assembly of the 32X game by Sonic fan site Sonic Retro. As of 2013, the source code is hosted on GitHub. |
| Little Big Adventure | 1994 (Windows) | 2021 | Action-adventure | Adeline Software International | Source code has been published on GitHub in 2021. |
| Lego Island | 1997 (Windows) | 2024 | Action-adventure | Mindscape | In June 2023, a group of GitHub users started decompiling the game, with the decompilation being functionally complete in late 2024. |
| Manic Miner | 1983 (ZX) | 2014 | Platformer | Bug-Byte | This classic ZX Spectrum game was disassembled by Richard Dymond back into Z80 source code, and includes some very comprehensive comments. |
| Mario Party 4 | 2002 (GCN) | 2025 | Party | Hudson Soft | Reverse engineered over the span of one-and-a-half years, it was the very first GameCube game to have a fully working decompilation, with the code being hosted on GitHub. |
| Mercenary, including Damocles and The Dion Crisis | 1985 | 2002 (several years prior; Mercenary) | Adventure | Novagen Software | A computer scientist fan reverse engineered all of the game engines and created a clone of the complete game series. Source for MDDClone isn't publicly available. |
| Metal Gear Solid | 1998 (PS) | 2019 (ongoing) | Action-adventure, stealth | Konami | A in-progress decompilation, with the majority of the games executables and levels decompiled as of 2026. |
| Metroid | 1986 (NES) | ? | Metroidvania | Nintendo R&D1, Intelligent Systems | The NES game was disassembled by the collaborative work of several developers over the course of years and modified to run on the more powerful MMC3 chip. |
| Might and Magic 6/7/8 | 1998 (Windows) | 2016 | Role-playing video game | New World Computing | Reverse engineered as world-of-might-and-magic on GitHub by Alexandr Parshin and other programmers. |
| Minecraft | 2009 (Windows) | 2010 | Sandbox game | Mojang | The Mod Coder Pack (MCP) offered scripts for de-obfuscation/decompilation of the Java-based version of Minecraft starting in 2010. The Mod Coder Pack was discontinued after Mojang began releasing deobfuscation mappings with each update in 2019. |
| Nicky Boum | 1992 | 2007 | Platformer | Microïds | Reverse engineered by Gregory Montoir and open-sourced in March 2006 with version 0.1.5. The engine reached with v0.2.0 playable status when development and distribution of the source code was stopped. The source code was made in 2017 available on GitHub for some time, before the repository was set to private. |
| Oo-Topos | 1982 (Apple II) | 2015 | Interactive fiction | Penguin Software | Penguin Software released several of their Comprehend Adventure engine games as freeware, also from the Transylvania series. After end of official support, Ryan Mallon reconstructed around July 2015 a source code variant of the game's engine to port these games. Ryan Mallon works also on reverse engineering The Lost Vikings engine. |
| Out Run | 1986 (Arcade) | 2012 | Arcade racing | Sega | Since around 2009 a game enthusiast worked on decompiling source code of Out Run. In 2012 a truthful engine named Cannonball was released on GitHub. To run the game, the original game's assets are required. Ports to many systems followed, like OpenPandora. |
| Paper Mario | 2000 (N64) | 2023 | Role-playing video game | Intelligent Systems | Reverse engineered decompilation of the Nintendo 64 game on GitHub. |
| Perfect Dark | 2000 (N64) | 2022 | FPS | Rare | Reverse engineered decompilation of the Nintendo 64 game on GitLab. |
| Pikmin | 2001 (GCN) | 2026 | Real-time strategy game | Nintendo EAD | Reverse engineered over the span of one-and-a-half years, it was the fourth GameCube game to have a fully working decompilation, with the code being hosted on GitHub. |
| Plants vs. Zombies | 2011 (Windows Phone) | 2021 | Tower Defense | PopCap | Reverse engineered decompilation of the Windows Phone version of the game on GitHub. |
| Pokémon Red and Blue | 1996 (GBC) | 2014 | Role-playing video game | Game Freak | Reverse engineered assembly of the Game Boy Color game on GitHub. |
| Pokémon Yellow | 1998 (GBC) | 2014 | Role-playing video game | Game Freak | Reverse engineered assembly of the Game Boy Color game on GitHub. |
| Pokémon Gold and Silver | 1999 (GBC) | 2015 | Role-playing video game | Game Freak | Reverse engineered assembly of the Game Boy Color game on GitHub. |
| Pokémon Crystal | 2000 (GBC) | 2014 | Role-playing video game | Game Freak | Reverse engineered assembly of the Game Boy Color game on GitHub. |
| Pong | 1972 | 2012 | Arcade game | Atari | The available schematics ("source code") was reconstructed and adapted for modern and available electronic parts to a new PCB design in 2012. |
| PowerSlave | 1996 (Saturn) | 2015 | FPS | Lobotomy Software | On 24 May 2015, an unofficial remake based on the PlayStation version was released by Samuel "Kaiser" Villarreal for free. In May 2015 publisher Night Dive Studios acquired the game rights, Villarreal and Night Dive Studios working on a digital distribution re-release. On 2 January 2017, Kaiser released the source code of his reverse engineered engine under the GPLv3 license on GitHub. |
| PowerSlave | 1997 (MS-DOS) | 2019 | FPS | Lobotomy Software | In November 2019 a reverse engineered port of the DOS version of Powerslave was released. The source code was released under the GPLv2 license. |
| RollerCoaster Tycoon 2 | 2002 (Windows) | 2014 | Business simulation game | Chris Sawyer | In April 2014, a project to reverse engineer Roller Coaster Tycoon 2 into platform independent C source code, was started under the name OpenRCT2 by Ted 'IntelOrca' John. Hosted as GPLv3 licensed open-source software on GitHub, it requires the original game's graphics and sound assets. |
| Sid Meier's Civilization | 1991 (MS-DOS) | 2026 | Turn-based strategy, 4X | Microprose | OpenCivOne, started in 2023, is a game rewrite targeting modern systems in platform-independent C#, released under the MIT license. CivD, released in 2026, is a separate byte-accurate code reconstruction in C and x86 assembly. |
| Silent Hill | 1999 (PS) | 2025 | Survival horror | Konami | A decompilation of the first Silent Hill game appeared in 2025, with 100% of code for the North American release decompiled in 2026, licensed under GPLv3. |
| Silent Hill 2 | 2001 (PS2) | 2026 | Survival horror | Konami | The second Silent Hill game was decompiled in 2026 alongside the third game, with the source code hosted on GitHub. |
| Silent Hill 3 | 2003 (PS2) | 2026 | Survival horror | Konami | The third Silent Hill game was decompiled in 2026 alongside the second game, with the source code hosted on GitHub. |
| Skifree | 1991 (Windows) | 2022 | Arcade | Microsoft | In 2022 reconstructed C code was released. |
| Snipes | 1983 (MS-DOS) | 2016 | early networked Multi player game maze game | SuperSet Software | In July 2016, a faithful port by reverse engineering the original game became available. Permission was granted by original authors Drew Major and Kyle Powell to make it public. The full C/C++ source code is available at GitHub. |
| Sonic & Knuckles | 1994 (Genesis) | 2006 | Platformer | Sega, Sonic Team | Initially disassembled by Sonic fans in 2006, with various iterations of the reverse engineered assembly released since 2010, the source code for the Sega Genesis game is currently hosted by Sonic fan site Sonic Retro on GitHub as of 2013. In 2019, a reverse engineered assembly of Sonic the Hedgehog 3 was added to the main source code; it was previously excluded for simplicity reasons. |
| Sonic Mania | 2017 (Windows) | 2022 | Platformer | Christian Whitehead, PagodaWest Games, Headcannon, Hyperkinetic Studios (Plus) | In August 2022, the base game and the 2018 Plus DLC were decompiled, with the code released on GitHub. |
| Sonic the Hedgehog | 1991 (Genesis) | 2004 | Platformer | Sega, Sonic Team | Initially disassembled by Sonic fans in 2004 alongside the second game, various iterations of the reverse engineered assembly of the Sega Genesis version were released beginning in June 2005. The source code is currently hosted by Sonic fan site Sonic Retro on GitHub as of 2013. |
| Sonic the Hedgehog | 2013 (Android/iOS) | 2021 | Platformer | Christian Whitehead, Simon Thomley | In January 2021, the games' 2013 remaster was decompiled, with the code released on GitHub. It also allowed for ports to other platforms such as PC. |
| Sonic the Hedgehog 2 | 1992 (Genesis) | 2004 | Platformer | Sega Technical Institute | Initially disassembled by Sonic fans in 2004 alongside the first game, various iterations of the reverse engineered assembly of the Sega Genesis version were released beginning in 2005. The source code is currently hosted by Sonic fan site Sonic Retro on GitHub as of 2013. |
| Sonic the Hedgehog 2 | 2013 (Android/iOS) | 2021 | Platformer | Christian Whitehead, Simon Thomley | In January 2021, the games' 2013 remaster was decompiled, with the code released on GitHub. It also allowed for ports to other platforms such as PC. |
| Sonic CD | 1993 (Sega CD) | 2025 | Platformer | Sega, Sonic Team | Reverse engineered assembly of the Sega CD game by Sonic fan site Sonic Retro, hosted on GitHub. |
| Sonic CD | 2011 (Windows) | 2021 | Platformer | Christian Whitehead, Simon Thomley | In January 2021, the games' 2011 remaster was decompiled, with the code released on GitHub. |
| Space Ace | 1984 (Apple IIGS) | 2015 | Interactive movie | Advanced Microcomputer Systems | In July 2015 Rebecca Heineman released a reverse engineered Apple IIGS source code version on GitHub. |
| Space Invaders | 1978 | 2019 | Arcade | Taito | In December 2019 a C translation by Jason McSweeney was released on GitHub. |
| Star Castle | 1980 (Atari 2600) | 2012 | Arcade | Atari | Former Atari engineer D. Scott Williamson re-created in three years work Star Castle faithfully for the Atari 2600. After a successful crowdfunding campaign on Kickstarter, he released everything for free on his website, including source code. |
| StarCraft | 1998 (Windows) | 2014 | Real-time strategy game | Blizzard Entertainment | By static recompilation and reverse engineering of the original x86 binary to an intermediate C "pseudo-assembly" source code, an unofficial version for the Pandora handheld and the ARM architecture became available in 2014. |
| Star Wars Episode I: Racer | 1999 | 2017 | Arcade racing | LucasArts | Reverse engineering of the code since 2017. Currently only a small part of the source code is reverse engineered, it is partly emulation. The main functionality is still coming from the original binary where newly created replacement parts are spliced-in in runtime. |
| Star Wars Jedi Knight: Dark Forces II | 1997 | 2013 | FPS | LucasArts | Since 2013, a recreation of the engine has been in development on GitHub. |
| Strike Commander | 1993 (MS-DOS) | 2013 | Flight simulator | Origin Systems | In 2013 a SC reverse engineering project by Fabien Sanglard with a reconstructed source code variant became available on GitHub as the original source code was most probably lost in the take over of Origin by EA. |
| Styx | 1983 | 1998 | Arcade | Windmill Software | Reverse engineered by Andrew Jenner in 1998, implemented in x86 assembly with the title Styx Remastered and released as GPL. |
| Super 3D Noah's Ark | 1994 (MS-DOS) | 2015 | FPS | Wisdom Tree | In October 2015 a community reconstructed, under usage of already released id software engine code, source code variant became available on Bitbucket. |
| Super Bomberman | 1993 (SNES) | 2015 | Action, Maze | Hudson Soft | Reverse engineered assembly and build system of Super Bomberman by Lior Helphon on GitHub. Rebuilds several different versions of the game, and can restore some disabled debug features. |
| Super Mario Bros. | 1985 (NES) | 2012 | Platformer | Nintendo R&D4 | Commented disassembly of SMB on GitHub. A statically reverse engineered version, compiling and running with SDL was developed around 2017–2018. |
| Super Mario Bros. 3 | 1988 (NES) | 2017 | Platformer | Nintendo R&D4 | Commented disassembly of SMB3 on GitHub. |
| Super Mario 64 | 1996 (N64) | 2019 | Platformer | Nintendo EAD | In 2016, enthusiasts began to rewrite every function by hand, referencing a MIPS disassembly, then compile the code with the game's original compiler in qemu-irix, resulting in an identical copy of the game. This took advantage of the fact that Nintendo didn't turn on any compiler optimizations for the first Japanese and US releases. Their work was leaked on 4chan in June 2019 but it was finally released in late August of the same year. |
| Super Mario Galaxy | 2007 (Wii) | 2026 | Platformer | Nintendo EAD | Reverse engineered decompilation of the Wii game on GitHub. |
| Super Mario Strikers | 2005 (GCN) | 2026 | Sports | Next Level Games | Reverse engineered decompilation of the GameCube game on GitHub. |
| Super Smash Bros. | 1999 (N64) | 2026 | Fighting | HAL Laboratory | Reverse engineered decompilation of the Nintendo 64 game on GitHub. |
| Super Smash Bros. Melee | 2001 (GCN) | 2026 | Fighting | HAL Laboratory | Reverse engineered decompilation of the GameCube game on GitHub. |
| Syndicate Wars | 1996 (MS-DOS) | 2010 | Real-time tactics | Bullfrog Productions | In January 2010 a reverse engineering project of the MS-DOS-based Syndicate Wars was finished by two developers and builds for Windows, Mac and Linux were released. It is complete beside networking and joystick code. |
| The Great Escape | 1986 (ZX) | 2016 | Arcade adventure | Denton Designs | David Thomas started in 2012 a reverse engineering project to create portable C source code from the ZX Spectrum version's binary, which reached in January 2016 compiling state. |
| The Last Ninja | 1987 (Amiga) | 2009 | Action-adventure | System 3 | Robert Crossfield reverse engineered a faithful engine from the Amiga version of the game since 2009 (inactive from 2014). First two levels were partially completed. |
| The Legend of Zelda: A Link to the Past | 1991 (SNES) | 2022 | Action-adventure | Nintendo EAD | Reverse engineered assembly of the Japanese Super Famicom version, which is hosted on GitHub. |
| The Legend of Zelda: Ocarina of Time | 1998 (N64) | 2021 | Action-adventure | Nintendo EAD | Reverse engineered over the span of two years, users decompiled the PAL debug ROM of the Master Quest release for speedrunners to more deeply understand the game. |
| The Legend of Zelda: Majora's Mask | 2000 (N64) | 2024 | Action-adventure | Nintendo EAD | Reverse engineered over the span of four years, the decompiled source code is available on GitHub. |
| The Legend of Zelda: The Minish Cap | 2004 (GBA) | 2024 | Action-adventure | Nintendo EAD | Reverse engineered over the span of four years, the decompiled source code is available on GitHub. |
| The Legend of Zelda: Twilight Princess | 2006 (GCN) | 2025 | Action-adventure | Nintendo EAD | Reverse engineered over the span of more than two years, the GameCube version was the second GameCube game to have a fully working decompilation, with the code being hosted on GitHub. |
| Tomb Raider: Chronicles | 2000 (PS) | 2017 | Action-adventure | Core Design | Around February 2017 PSX SDK tools and debug symbols leaked to a forum which ignited a reverse engineering project on GitHub. Status, compiling. |
| Touhou Project (1 to 5) | 1996 | 2014 | Shoot 'em up | ZUN Soft | "The Touhou PC-98 Restoration Project" was started around 2014 on GitHub on base of found source code of libraries. In progress. |
| Touhou Project (from 6 onwards) | 2002 | 2014 | Shoot 'em up | Team Shanghai Alice | PyTouhou is a free and open-source reimplementation of Touhou 6 engine in Python and now Rust by three French programmers: Emmanuel Gil Peyrot, Thibaut Girka and Gauvain Roussel-Tarbouriech. While the Python branch is mostly complete, albeit for a few bugs, the Rust branch is still a work-in-progress. Other Touhou Project engine reimplementations after the 5th installment are a work-in-progress. |
| Transport Tycoon Deluxe | 1994 (MS-DOS) | 2004 | Business simulation game | Chris Sawyer/Microprose | In 2003, Ludvig Strigeus started to reverse engineer Transport Tycoon Deluxe and convert the game to C. In 2004, this re-engineered Transport Tycoon Deluxe was released and christened OpenTTD and is still under active development by the community. |
| Ultima 3: Exodus | 1983 | 2002 | Role-playing video game | Richard Garriott | Disassembled and ported to GBC in 2001 by Sven Carlberg. Richard Garriott was aware and pleased by this work. |
| Undertale | 2015 | 2019 | Role-playing video game | Toby Fox | The game's decompiled source code was uploaded to GitHub in February 2019, although it has since been taken down. |
| Zorgons Revenge | 1983 (Oric) | 2014 | Shooter game | John Sinclair | Jean-François Fabre created binary translation libraries for Oric BASIC and assembly code to portable C and used it for nine games. Source code re-created and released for: House of Death, L'Aigle d'Or, Le Manoir du Dr Genius, Le Retour du Dr Genius, Rendez-vous de la Terreur, Xenon 1, Strip 21, Zebbie, Zorgons' Revenge. Build available for the OpenPandora. |
| ZZT | 1991 (MS-DOS) | 2020 | Action-adventure, puzzle | Tim Sweeney / Potomac Computer Systems | ZZT's source code got reconstructed by Adrian Siekierka in 2020. Compilation with Turbo Pascal 5.5 produces an identical .EXE file than the original release. Done with permission from Tim Sweeney (who lost the original source code). The source code is released under a permissive license on GitHub. |

== See also ==
- Category:Commercial video games with freely available source code.
- List of open-source game engines
- List of open-source video games
- List of formerly proprietary software
- List of commercial video games released as freeware
- List of freeware games
- List of proprietary source-available software
- Source port
- Source-available software
