= Novagen =

Novagen may refer to:

- Novagen, a brand of chemicals and biochemicals manufactured by Merck Biosciences subdivision of Merck KGaA
- Novagen Software
