= One Hour One Life =

2018 video game

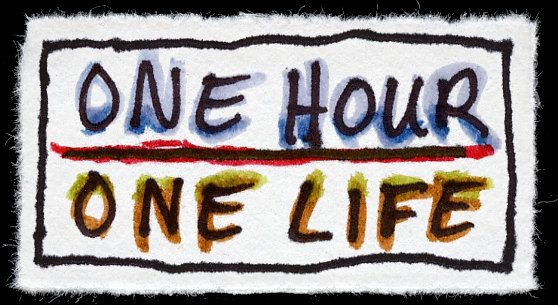
- Developer: Jason Rohrer
- Publisher: Jason Rohrer
- Platforms: Windows, macOS, Linux
- Release: 27 February 2018; 8 November 2018 (Steam)
- Genre: Survival
- Mode: Massively multiplayer

One Hour One Life is a 2018 massively multiplayer online game developed and published by Jason Rohrer. Each player in the survival game lives for, at most, 60 minutes in a large, persistent world, with each minute representing a year of life. They must gather and grow food, craft tools and build societies in order to survive. The game's source code and assets are placed into the public domain, and are freely available on GitHub, with accounts being sold for access to the primary servers hosting the game. Originally available only on the website onehouronelife.com, it was later released on Steam in November 2018.

The main ideas influencing the game's design are player cooperation, sustainability and the prospect of developing a civilization. The game has had a positive reception, with critics comparing the game favorably to Don't Starve and praising its social aspects. Rohrer has stressed the continued development of the game until at least 2020. The game stopped development on 11 November 2025 so Rohrer could work on other projects.

== Gameplay ==
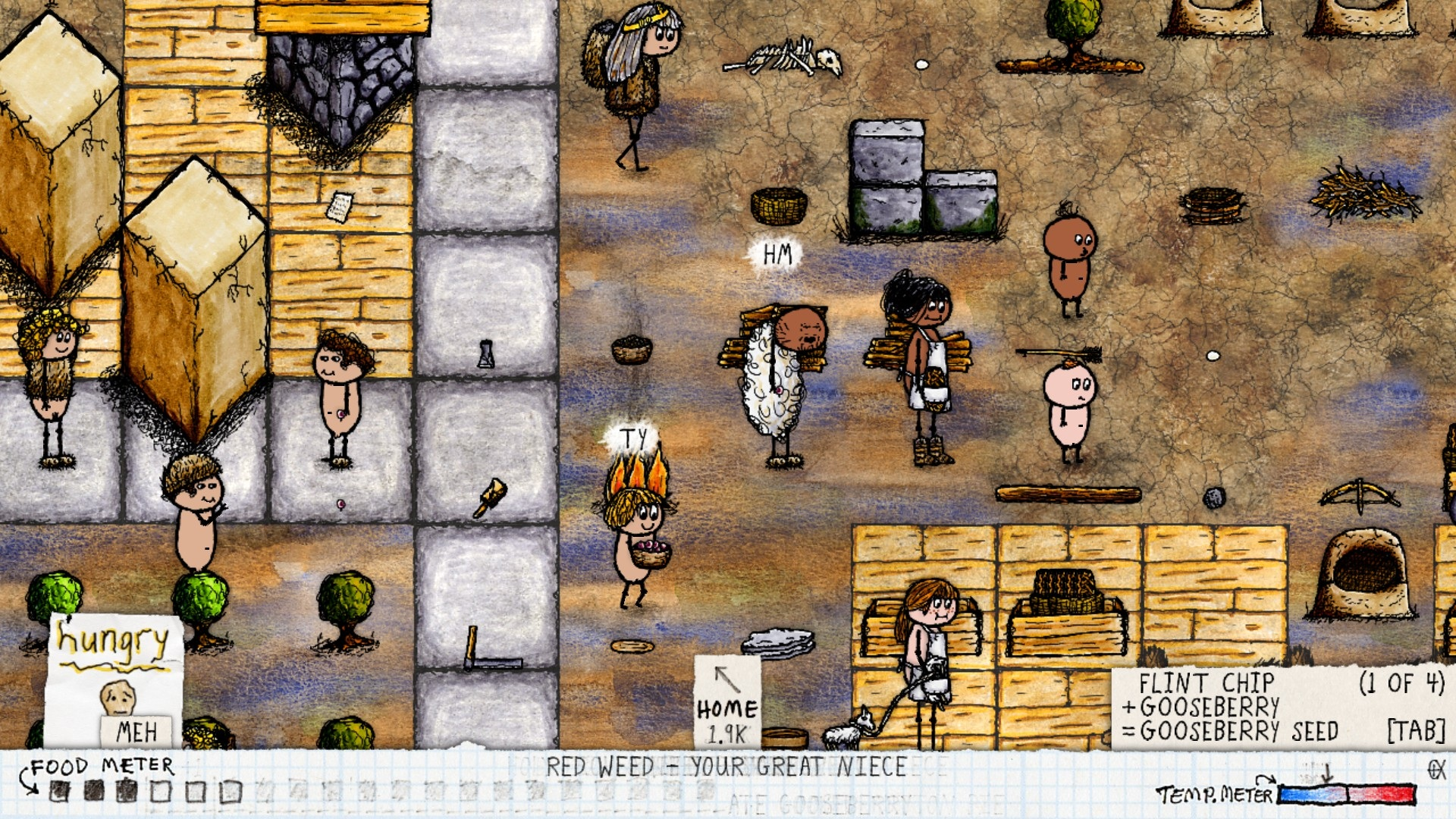
Players gather in a village. To the right are two babies, who must be cared for by others.

Players spawn randomly into the world either as a child, with another player as mother, or as a young adult, an Eve, if the number of babies is already too high. Each minute played represents one year in the life of the player's character. For their first three years, players are unable to interact with objects and rely entirely on other players to feed them, while initially only being able to speak one letter at a time. Each player has a food bar, whose size varies with age, that fills until full adulthood (17/18) and depletes over time when a player hits 40 years old. Players die of old age upon becoming 60 years old, but can also be killed by animals, other players, or their food bar being emptied. One Hour One Life is a permadeath game, meaning that a player restarts from nothing after dying.

One Hour One Life has over 3000 human-makeable objects, which may be produced through crafting. The process of crafting involves clicking an object to pick it up, then clicking on another object in an effort to combine them. Crafting is necessary as the food sources available without it are limited.

Players have an equal chance of spawning either as a man or as a woman, which the only difference being that women alone can birth new players when they are between the ages of 14 and 39. playing as a male character may be easier due to a lower chance of causing another player's death.

== Development ==
Rohrer has said that the idea that led to the game was a thought experiment about how long it would take for humanity to get "from arrowheads to iPhones" with "the knowledge we have today". In an interview in Destructoid, Rohrer discussed the problems with building a society in the game Rust, and how he planned to remedy those issues in One Hour One Life. He argued that the occurrence of trolling and the lack of impact of death are detrimental to creating a system of justice and, by extension, building a community. In One Hour One Life, the permadeath mechanic and the initial period of helplessness when a player spawns as a baby serve to force people to work together. Rohrer also commented that the themes of death and the choices made in the face of death are "constant in [his] career" and saw One Hour One Life as bringing together the ideas found in his other games into a "cohesive whole".

An important part of the game is the idea of sustainability, which Rohrer discussed by email with Matthew Gault, writing in Vice Motherboard. Because villages run a risk of overexploiting their surroundings, successful communities require good resource management. Rohrer describes this as necessitated by the game's high difficulty, which is reinforced by repeated failure: all villages will die eventually, but the societies supporting cooperation and sustainability are able to survive longer. Over time, players have become better at continuing family lines, which Rohrer attributes to the emergence of culture, morality and taboos supporting these ideas. This is connected to Rohrer's own belief that morality does not exist as an independent concept but has evolved for practical reasons.

After the game's release, Rohrer stated that the game had been in development for three years and that he had at least two more years of work left. During this time he aims to create craftable objects until the game has 10 000 of them. To accomplish this, Rohrer created a program that automatically traces sprites from scanned images. If required, he records a crafting sound for the object with his own voice.

== Release ==
One Hour One Life was released on 27 February 2018 on the website onehouronelife.com. In an interview with Richard Moss in Gamasutra in August 2018, Rohrer described that he deliberately had avoided putting the game on digital distribution platforms such as Steam and GOG. His reasons for doing so included the large amount of work needed to integrate the game's code into these services, as well as the control offered by hosting the game independently, which he described as allowing "a very sort of customized experience" in regards to "how the website ... is sort of integrated with your account". The game's website, aside from distributing the game, contains various information about things such as family trees and character trivia. Rohrer describes this as giving the website the feel of a "cohesive portal" for the game. The game was released on Steam on 8 November 2018.

== Reception ==
Reception

Review score
Publication	Score
The Games Machine	9/10

KG Orphanides, in an article in Wired, described the game as tough but more accessible than Rohrer's other games, while noting the game's short sessions allowed for casual play. Orphanides also praised the game's social aspects and found the game successful in condensing human life within its short time span.

Matthew Gault, writing in Vice Motherboard, described the game as having "broke[n] [his] heart and restored [his] faith in humanity". Gault went on to say that while the survival gameplay is reminiscent of Don't Starve, One Hour One Life also touches on themes of "sustainability, morality, and civilization". He also stated that despite the hostile nature often found in game communities the players of One Hour One Life generally take care of each other.

Roberto Turrini, reviewing for the Italian game magazine The Games Machine, called One Hour One Life a "masterpiece of game design" and claimed it lacked any negative aspects. He rated the game 9/10.

One Hour One Life had poor sales figures at its Steam launch, selling 315 copies compared to 2400 for Rohrer's The Castle Doctrine. However, sales improved over time. Four months after the launch on Steam One Hour One Life had grossed almost $700,000.

== You Are Hope ==
Developer Dual Decade runs an unofficial mobile fork of the game, titled You Are Hope, for iOS and Android. It uses a fork of the One Hour One Life source code but runs on an independent server hosted by Dual Decade, and features a number of changes and additions. Only the Chinese version has ads.

Jordan Thompson, writing for TouchArcade, rated the game 4 out of 5 stars in a review, describing it as a "more mechanically deep version of Don't Starve" and praising the player interaction and the decisions of life-and-death "that will sit with you long after you play". Maria Alexander reviewed the game for Gamezebo, giving it 4.5 out of 5 stars while saying that it was "a crafter's dream" due to the many ways in which materials can be broken down and used. Both reviews criticized the mobile controls, though Gamezebo considered it only a minor issue.

=== Branding controversy ===
In August 2018, Dual Decade created a mobile port of the game, originally titled One Hour One Life for Mobile, using the One Hour One Life source code which Rohrer initially agreed was fine.

In March 2019, Rohrer publicly expressed frustration with Dual Decade's port. He worried their use of the same name could have potentially misled buyers into thinking it was a product made by him, even though they had labeled it an unofficial port in the descriptions of both the English and Chinese versions, and stated on their forums which of his updates they were porting over to their version. Rohrer eventually wrote a post titled Open Letter to the Mobile Developers on the One Hour One Life forums. He cited at least one reviewer of the mobile game who was not aware the port was not directly contributed by Rohrer. He also cited an email of a Chinese player who thought Dual Decade was stealing his game, but ultimately, the wording only stated it was the Chinese adaption created by Dual Decade. Dual Decade expressed concerns that the game would not do well if it was labeled as unofficial. Jason Rohrer asked Dual Decade to state that the game was an "unofficial adaptation", which they did in the English version of the game, but not in the Chinese version. In response, a spokesperson from Dual Decade cited their rights to use the work and name, as Rohrer had placed it in the public domain, and attempted to negotiate with Rohrer.

As a result of the public dispute, Dual Decade agreed to hard-fork the game, changing the graphics and title, and continuing development independently of Rohrer. The name of the mobile port was changed to You Are Hope on 22 March 2019.

== Two Hours One Life ==
Two Hours One Life is an open-source fork of the original game. Unlike in the original game, the player's life lasts a maximum of 2 hours (or 120 in-game years). There are also new items, mechanics and balancing changes, which are decided by the game's community.

== See also ==
- The Castle Doctrine
