= Mercenary III =

1992 video game

Mercenary III: The Dion Crisis
- Developer(s): Novagen Software
- Designer(s): Paul Woakes
- Artist(s): Mo Warden
- Platform(s): Atari ST, Amiga
- Release: 1992
- Genre(s): Action-adventure
- Mode(s): Single-player

Mercenary III is the third and final video game in the Mercenary series. It was written by Paul Woakes for the Atari ST and Amiga and published by Novagen Software in 1992.

== Development ==
Evil PC BIL

Mercenary III (also known as Mercenary III: The Dion Crisis or Damocles II) is the third game in the series. It was released on the Atari ST and Amiga in 1992.

== Gameplay ==
Taking a ride

Mercenary III is set in the Gamma System again and is based on an improved version of the engine used by Damocles: this time the roads of the various cities are populated by vehicles such as taxis and buses; observation and attack spacecraft are present in the skies; and interaction (albeit to a limited degree) with other characters is possible.

After Eris' President Margaret steps down, the player becomes involved in a political crisis on the planet Dion, pitting their wits against a power-hungry politician running for president. The goal of Mercenary III is to prevent this politician from being elected to office. Similarly to the earlier titles, there are several ways of achieving this, with both straightforward and oblique solutions. No mission disks were released for this concluding chapter of the Mercenary series. According to the poster that accompanied the game, the events of Mercenary III take place on 15 January 2101.

The villain of this game is a character who appeared in Mercenary: PC BIL, short for the Palyars Commander's Brother-In-Law.

== Reception ==
John Davison jnr for Page 6 described Mercenary III as "a superb game that should keep you engrossed for many hours. The scope of the puzzles coupled with the new character interaction make this a tremendously playable game".

Paul Presley for The One said "Mercenary III grabs your attention firmly by its collar and doesn't let go".

Tim Boone for Computer and Video Games wrote: "A worthy successor which could have been another classic, Mercenary III offers a fantastic gamesplaying experience, but just pips itself at the Hit! post by being a tad too faithful to the others. A great game nonetheless!"

Karl Foster for Amiga Power said that "the best thing about Mercenary III is the fact that there are six ways to complete it, five of which are outlined in hint sheets included in the package [...] The sixth is left a mystery, to give you something to puzzle out".

Maff Evans for Amiga Format wrote: "For those of you that haven't played any of the other games in the series, this then will make an excellent space adventure. If, on the other hand, you've played the others to death and are expecting something new to present a challenge, prepare to be slightly disappointed. You've been there many times before".

ACE's wrote: "Of course, anybody who enjoyed the earlier Mercenary games won't need to be told that this is right up their street also".
