= Receiver (video game) =

2012 video game

- Developer: Wolfire Games
- Publisher: Wolfire Games
- Engine: Unity
- Platforms: Microsoft Windows, Mac OS X, Linux
- Release: June 18, 2012
- Genres: First-person shooter, simulation
- Mode: Single-player

Receiver is a 2012 first-person shooter video game developed by Wolfire Games. The game attempts to portray realistic gun mechanics through a unique reloading system, where each step of reloading is assigned a different button. The player scavenges items and audio tapes which reveal the story in a procedurally generated world.

Receiver was released in June 2012 for Linux, Microsoft Windows, and Mac OS X. In 2013, the game was made available as a free copy for people who had previously purchased another Wolfire Games video game, Overgrowth.

The game's sequel, Receiver 2, was announced on December 13, 2019, through a video uploaded to YouTube by Wolfire Games. It was released for Windows, Linux, and Mac OS X on April 14, 2020.

== Gameplay ==
In Receiver, players must control an in-game character, known as a "Receiver", to search for eleven audio tapes (voiced by Aubrey Serr, their lead artist), from around a procedurally generated world, randomly arranged after each death. Ammunition and flashlights are scattered throughout the world as well. Players start with a random handgun, either a Smith & Wesson Model 10 revolver, a Colt M1911A1 semi-automatic pistol, or a selective fire Glock 17 pistol with an automatic sear. Players are also given a random inventory of ammunition and/or spare magazines for their weapon. Players may also start with a flashlight (modeled after the Mini Maglite). While searching for tapes, the player encounters stationary sentry turrets and mobile hover drones that attack the player. A single hit to the player will kill them. Shooting these automated defenses can disable them, with shots to vital components, such as the camera, the ammunition box, a motor, or specifically the battery, which when hit, will instantly disable them. If a player dies, they lose all progress and the game is reset with a new, randomly-generated level layout, spawn position, and inventory.

A core element of the game is how the player fires, and reloads their handgun. The gun has to be used in a semi-realistic fashion, meaning that all aspects of reloading the gun have to be enacted individually with different key presses. Rather than starting with a set of fully loaded magazines as seen in most shooters, the player finds cartridges which must be individually loaded into their revolver's chambers or pistol magazines. In-game actions mapped to individual key presses include, but are not limited to: removing the magazine from the pistol, inserting a cartridge into a magazine, inserting a magazine into the pistol, pulling back the slide, cocking the hammer, toggling the safety, inspecting the chamber, engaging and/or releasing the slide stop, and spinning the cylinder on a revolver. To emphasize understanding of the firearm, the player's handgun starts in a random condition; the magazine or chamber may be loaded or empty, the slide may be locked or unlocked, and the safety may be on or off.

In Receiver 2, the game also introduces the core element of firearm safety, by the addition of firearm malfunctions, this includes: failure to eject, failure to feed, double feeds, failure to extract (the extractor failing to extract a spent casing from the chamber) and out-of-battery malfunctions. In relation to firearm safety, the player can also cause negligent discharges, depending on whether they holstered carefully or carelessly, which can have consequences ranging from (depending on the firearm used) unintentionally shooting their leg, or in worst case scenarios, instant death. The additions mentioned before-hand are also explained in-game by the audio tapes (now narrated by Leo Wiggins).

== Plot ==
The audio tapes describe a technology called "mindtech", and how an antagonistic entity called "the Threat" has applied it within media to weaken the human population, and that it now has unleashed a catastrophic event called "the mindkill". Later on, the tapes detail various planes of existence, explain firearm operation, and instructs the player to listen to a "cleartape" in order to become "awake".

== Receiver 2 ==
In Receiver 2, all gun mechanics are simulated, instead of some, according to developer Wolfire Games. The player is tasked with locating, and listening to (or optionally, destroying) 3-5 audio tapes (depending on their rank) in a procedurally generated world. Cartridges (now occasionally appearing inside small, unbranded, ammunition boxes) and flashlights are also scattered throughout the world. Players start with a random handgun. All guns from previous games, including the Smith & Wesson Model 10 revolver, the Colt M1911, and the select-fire Glock 17 make a return. New guns are also added, including the Colt Detective Special, the Desert Eagle Mark I, the Beretta M9, the SIG Sauer P226, the Hi-Point C-9, and the Colt Single Action Army.

Some specific tapes now include darker tones and topics, which will grow worse and worse throughout the tape, until it sounds like the Receiver recording is likely attempting suicide. This is a "Threat echo", in which "the voice of the Threat" takes control of the player's firearm and hands, in an attempt to force them to commit suicide too. This can be prevented by unloading the gun before the player completely loses control and the barrel is turned to the in-game character's face. The game also features a "rank-up" system, where after collecting enough tapes, the player advances to the next rank, potentially unlocking new firearms and tapes. Upon death, the player will revert back to the previous rank, but retains all of their earned rewards.

== Development ==
Receiver was originally created as part of the 7 Day FPS Challenge in 2012, built on "gun handling mechanics, randomized levels, and unordered storytelling."

The game was released in June 2012, and on Steam in April 2013 after being accepted as part of Steam Greenlight.

The first content update for Receiver was released on September 3, 2012, and added a flashlight, a Smith & Wesson Model 10 revolver, and a Glock 17, among other features.

The source code of the game is available since 2012 on GitHub under non-commercial license conditions.

The game was last updated on June 6, 2023, which fixes an issue where players running the game on a MacOS machine that's using an Apple silicon chip were unable to get past the 'Splash screen'.

Receiver 2 was last updated on February 22, 2022, introducing 4 languages (Portuguese, traditional Chinese, Czech and Turkish) translated by the games' community members and previously supported languages such as English, simplified Chinese, Japanese and Spanish.

== Reception ==
In Destructoid's 8.5/10 review, they said that "successfully reloading a gun for the first time through sheer muscle memory is easily one of the greatest feelings in gaming", concluding that "Receiver is one of those games that feels so incredibly satisfying once it is finally understood".

The Verge described the game as "wrapped up in a slick package that really makes you feel like a cool, infiltrating spy."

== See also ==
- Black Shades, a previous first-person shooter made by Wolfire founder David Rosen
