= Damocles (video game) =

1990 video game

- Developer: Novagen Software
- Publisher: Bethesda Softworks
- Designer: Paul Woakes
- Artist: Mo Warden
- Platforms: Amiga, Atari ST
- Release: May 1990
- Genre: Action-adventure
- Mode: Single-player

Damocles is a 1990 video game developed by Novagen. It is the second game in the Mercenary series.

== Gameplay ==
Once again, the player is stranded on a planet, Eris, with an inoperable spacecraft. Unlike the first game, however, the scope of Damocles is considerably widened, offering the player an entire planetary system to explore (the Gamma System; the player's original destination before the Interlude on Targ). There is also a race-against-time element to the game as a comet, the eponymous Damocles (a reference to the Sword of Damocles), is hurtling towards Eris. The player is encouraged to both escape Eris and find a means to prevent Damocles from destroying the planet, if possible without destroying the comet. Although an obvious, but destructive, solution exists, Damocles has no fewer than five distinct solutions.

Damocles includes orbital mechanics in the game physics. While also featuring less standard physics (e.g. teleportation), it includes a detailed representation of the dynamics of the Gamma System and even has a simplified form of special relativity. To cross the planetary system in reasonable (to the player) time, time dilation occurs. However, given that the player has only a few hours to save Eris, extended periods at near-light speed are unwise. One of the game's many solutions involves manipulating various planetary bodies in order to make use of the changes in gravitational pulls to divert the Damocles comet. From an aesthetic point of view, the inclusion of celestial physics allows the player to experience attractively-rendered sunrises and sunsets while on planet surfaces as well as various satellite occultations.

== Setting ==
Presidential Palace

Gamma system as represented in the game manual

Damocles contains many real-world references, particularly drawn from the UK in the 1980s. For example, the president of the planet Eris is named Margaret, after Margaret Thatcher (British Prime Minister from 1979 to 1990); there is a bank called Lawson Bank, after Nigel Lawson (British chancellor of the exchequer from 1983 to 1989, though a real Lawson Bank does exist). Some of the references are more elusive. For example, several stores are called "GUM Stores", after the Russian Gosudarstvennyj Universalnyj Magazin department stores. (However, the fictional planet of Eris is not a reference to the real-life dwarf planet of the same name, as the latter was only discovered in 2005, some 15 years after the release of Damocles.)

Despite these references, the game universe has no actual connections with Earth, since the player is given information that the Gamma System was actively explored before the present day (e.g. upon approaching a particular moon, Benson informs the player that a space flight company was already located there in 1190). According to the poster that accompanied the game, the events of Damocles take place on 27 April 2099.

== Development and release ==
Damocles was released on the Atari ST and Amiga platforms in 1990. Development on the game started as early as 1987. Commodore 64 and ZX Spectrum versions were originally in development, but eventually cancelled as a consequence of the declining 8-bit market. Unlike Mercenary, Damocles represented the game environment using filled polygon graphics, allowing a both more realistic and colourful world.

== Reception ==
Reception

Review score
Publication	Score
Bristol Post	3/5

Judith Kilbury-Cobb for Info said: "I would like to see more in the way of sound effects, but I still enjoyed this one a whole lot".

John S Davison for Page 6 said: "For me Damocles has everything – top notch presentation, excitement, depth, lots of humor, addictiveness... I could go on forever!"

Eugene Lacey for Commodore User described "Amiga gaming at its very best".

Eugene Lacey for ACE said that "Damocles has everything – the thrill of discovery, the fun of exploration, a totally believable world, a tough challenge, and even the odd bit of blasting".

Amiga Format wrote: "Whether or not you like 3D space adventures, Damocles is an experience not to be missed".

Zzap! said the game is "a superlatively polished, amazingly large and challenging adventure brought to life through amazing 3-D 16-bit graphics".

Brian Nesbitt for Computer and Video Games concluded: "Fluid solid 3D graphics generate a wholly believable environment which is a joy to explore, and the unique feeling of being there is exemplary".

Robin Hogg for The Games Machine gave a positive review for the game, saying "Welcome back Mercenary, you've been away for far too long".

Neil Jackson for ST Format stated that "Damocles keeps pulling you back to the screen, no matter how much you want to go to bed".
