= The Castles of Dr. Creep =

1984 video game

- Developer(s): Ed Hobbs
- Publisher(s): NA: Broderbund; EU: Ariolasoft; Strobs Canardly (2016)
- Platform(s): Commodore 64; Re-releases; Microsoft Windows, OS X, Linux
- Release: Commodore 64: NA: 1984; EU: 1984; Windows, OS X, Linux: WW: 2016; Xbox: WW: 2023
- Genre(s): Puzzle-platform
- Mode(s): Single-player, multiplayer

The Castles of Dr. Creep is a puzzle-platform game for the Commodore 64 written by Ed Hobbs and published by Broderbund in 1984. It takes place in thirteen medieval castles owned by the eponymous doctor, and the player's task is to escape from each castle. One- or two-player games are possible, allowing collaborative gaming for solving the puzzles. It was re-released via Steam on September 2, 2016, and Xbox on February 26, 2023

== Gameplay ==
When the game starts, the player can select from any of the thirteen castles, which have horror-movie-style names such as Sylvania, Carpathia, Callanwolde, or Lovecraft, or a tutorial castle (which, if counted, brings the total to fourteen). The player then starts from a specific room inside the castle, and must use his wits and skill to traverse through a vast network of interconnected rooms to find the exit.

The rooms consist of platforms on various levels, connected by ladders and sliding poles. Doors lead from one room to another. Some doors are locked, and the player must find a key to be able to go through them. Most doors are not locked, but may be opened by a doorbell. However, in some cases, the doorbell is only on one "side" of the door (i.e. in one connecting room but not the other), and sometimes the doorbell is difficult to reach.

A central aspect of the game is the imaginative use of various contraptions and devices in the rooms. Conveyor belts, force fields, and laser guns hinder the player's progress. In some places, the player must avoid, trap, or kill mummies and Frankenstein monsters. Teleport devices are often required to navigate through a room.

The player has an unlimited number of lives. After a death, the player re-enters the castle at the "start" door. The game constantly keeps track of how much time has passed, and when the player manages to escape the castle, the time taken is recorded into the Hall of Fame, but only if the unlimited lives option is turned off (in this case there are three lives). In the original Commodore 64 platform, saving and re-loading a game disqualifies the player from the Hall of Fame.

== Reviews ==
- Games #59

== Legacy ==
Jordan Mechner cited The Castles of Dr. Creep as one of the main inspirations for his 1989 game Prince of Persia.

A game enthusiast worked on a remake for the game starting in 2010 by reverse engineering the original. The source code is on GitHub under the GPLv3 license. The remake was released on Steam by the original author and the remake author in September 2016 for Microsoft Windows, OS X, and Linux and Xbox in February 2023.
