= Mercenary (video game) =

1985 video game

- Developer: Novagen
- Designers: Paul Woakes; Bruce Jordan
- Artist: Peter Gudynas
- Platforms: Atari 8-bit, Commodore 64, ZX Spectrum, Amstrad CPC, Atari ST, Amiga, Commodore 16 / Plus/4
- Release: 1985
- Genre: Action-adventure
- Mode: Single-player

Mercenary is a 3D action-adventure game written for the Atari 8-bit computers and published by Novagen Software in 1985. It was converted to the Commodore 64, ZX Spectrum, Amstrad CPC, Atari ST, Amiga, Commodore 16, and Plus/4. The game uses vector graphics renderings of vast, sparse environments and has various methods of completing the game. It was also released as Mercenary: Escape from Targ and Mercenary: A Flight Simulator Adventure.

Mercenary was favourably reviewed and followed by two sequels: Damocles and Mercenary III: The Dion Crisis.

== Plot ==
Having crash-landed on the planet Targ (en route to the Gamma System of Damocles), the player's main objective is to find a means of escape. There are several ways to achieve this end. A civil war between two factions, the Palyars (indigenous "good guys") and the Mechanoids (invading "bad guys"), affords the player an opportunity to earn money to buy their escape from Targ.

The player is accompanied and advised by Benson, a "9th generation PC". This interaction is handled via a scrolling news ticker at the bottom of the display. As well as providing assistance to the player, much of the humour within the games comes from the occasional sarcastic remarks made by Benson.

== Gameplay ==
Bosher stadium (Atari ST)

The player explores a world rendered in realtime 3D graphics, completing a number of non-linear tasks in order to achieve a single main objective. The title of the series derives from the player's role in carrying out tasks as a "hired gun". The player is able to play the warring factions off against one another to their own advantage. For instance, each faction seeks the destruction of installations belonging to its rival, and the capture of material or other resources to support their cause. There are other routes to escape, and it is possible to combine strategies to both leave Targ and keep the wealth accrued there.

== Mercenary: The Second City ==
Scenery from The Second City (Atari 8-bit)

Mercenary: The Second City, released in 1986, is an expansion pack. Initially its major distinction is the new colour scheme, representing the other side of the planet. The ground is now red rather than the original green, and the sky is no longer blue. Instead, it is pink in the Amiga and Atari (8-bit and ST) versions, dark blue on the Commodore 8-bit platforms (C64 and Plus/4) and yellow on the ZX Spectrum.

However, after a similar objective, the substantive differences reveal themselves subtly: there is a different city layout, a more intricate underground complex, a new set of puzzles to overcome and several significant changes with game objects.

== Reception ==
Reception

Review scores
| Publication | Score |
|---|---|
| Crash | 96% |
| Zzap!64 | 97% |
| RUN | A |
| CU Amiga | 8/10 |

Awards
| Publication | Award |
|---|---|
| Zzap!64 | Gold Medal |
| Crash | Crash Smash |

Mercenary received strong positive reviews from gaming magazines across all platforms, with the original Mercenary receiving a Gold Medal from Zzap!64 magazine. RUN reviewer Bob Sodaro noted the replay value of Mercenary for the Commodore 64, writing: "Prior to marking up the maps [included with the game], you should make a number of photocopies so you'll have clean copies when playing subsequent adventures". Antic also advised making copies of the map and taking notes. It described the game's size and Atari 8-bit version's graphics as "awesome", but warned that a colour display was required. The magazine concluded that "Mercenary's video effects make it a good game overall. But if you aren't in the right place to pick up the clues, you'll get nowhere".

The ZX Spectrum version of Mercenary was voted number 15 in the Your Sinclair Readers' Top 100 Games of All Time. In 1993, Commodore Force ranked the game at number six on its list of the top 100 Commodore 64 games. In 1996, GamesMaster ranked the Commodore 64 version 33rd on their "Top 100 Games of All Time".

Steve Jarratt, editor of Edge, listed Mercenary as one of his favorite games of all time and the game was ranked 67th in the magazine's list of top 100 games in 2000.

== Legacy ==
=== Damocles ===
Damocles (also advertised as Mercenary II) is the second game in the series. It was released on the Atari ST and Amiga platforms in 1990. Commodore 64 and ZX Spectrum versions were in development but cancelled. Damocles represents the game environment using filled polygon graphics. Two mission disks were released.

=== Mercenary III ===
Mercenary III (also known as Mercenary III: The Dion Crisis or Damocles II) is the third game in the series. It was released on the Atari ST and Amiga in 1992. This time the roads of the various cities are populated by vehicles such as taxis and buses. Observation and attack spacecraft are present in the skies. Interaction with other characters is possible to a limited degree.

=== Re-releases ===
Mercenary and The Second City were later combined into the Mercenary Compendium.

In the 2000s, the three games were ported to Microsoft Windows. It was distributed with the agreement of the former Novagen team. The program, called MDDClone (Mercenary, Damocles, Dion crisis Clone) is freeware, includes all three games, selectable through a drop-down list. The graphics and gameplay are identical to the Atari ST version, with the additional option to fix some bugs that were originally present.

Another port, focusing on the first game, was released in 2010. Called MDDClone-SDL, this offers support for higher resolutions and texture mapping. Versions for Windows, OSX, Linux and FreeBSD are available.

In 2018, an open source port of Damocles and Mercenary III was released. Called Mercenary Reloaded, this port offers support for higher resolutions, a higher frame rate with smoother movements, virtual reality as per the specifications of the Oculus Rift head-mounted display, and a separate side-by-side stereoscopic mode.

== Works cited ==
- "The 100 best games of all time". Edge. No. 80. Future plc. 2000.
