= Limit Theory =

- Developer: Procedural Reality
- Director: Josh Parnell
- Platforms: Microsoft Windows; OS X; Linux
- Release: Cancelled
- Genre: Real-time strategy
- Mode: Single-player

Limit Theory is a cancelled real-time strategy video game developed by Josh Parnell under the Procedural Reality name. Parnell launched a Kickstarter campaign to crowdfund the development of the game in November 2012, with an intended release in early 2014. Although the campaign was successful, raising more than three times the required amount, the project eventually entered development hell. In September 2018, the title was officially cancelled. Since then, game's development has been used as an example of occupational burnout in indie video game development by some video game journalists.

== Gameplay ==
Limit Theory was meant to be a real-time strategy game with a heavy procedural generation element. The game is played from a first or third person perspective exploring outer space. Each planet was going to be procedurally generated, and with NPCs that could be traded with. There were plans to allow the player to engage in a variety of activities, like mining planets, being a pirate, or a bounty hunter. Once enough wealth was acquired, the player could buy ships and hire pilots to expand their empire. The game's focus on freedom was inspired by The Elder Scrolls III: Morrowind.

== Development ==
Josh Parnell, the developer of Limit Theory, launched a Kickstarter campaign on November 20, 2012, to help crowdfund the costs of producing the game. The initial funding goal for the campaign was set at $50,000, which was reached in a week. Goals for OS X and Linux ports were also reached. The Kickstarter campaign officially ended with a total of $187,865. On April 28, 2013, a playable prototype was released to backers, which was praised by Rock Paper Shotgun's Jim Rossignol, especially because it was the work of one man. Parnell posted updates on the Kickstarter page in a regular basis until February 2015. Two months later, in April, he confirmed to Rock Paper Shotgun that he was still working on the game.

Four months later, in September, Parnell posted a new update detailing, among other things, his struggles with his mental health while developing the game alone in a cabin in the mountains of Tennessee. The updates resumed their regularity, but on September 28, 2018, Josh Parnell announced the cancellation of the title, and a promise to release the source code to the public. The promise was eventually fulfilled on July 24, 2022. The license chosen was the Unlicense. In addition, the 2013 prototype (only as a binary) was also uploaded to GitHub.
