= The Castle Doctrine =

2014 video game

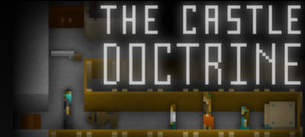
- Cover art on Steam
- Developer: Jason Rohrer
- Publisher: Jason Rohrer
- Platforms: Microsoft Windows; OS X; Linux
- Release: January 29, 2014
- Genres: Strategy, roguelike
- Mode: Massively multiplayer

The Castle Doctrine is a 2014 strategy video game developed and published by Jason Rohrer for Microsoft Windows, OS X, and Linux via Valve's Steam platform. The game was released on January 29, 2014, for all platforms and is available as public domain software on SourceForge. Set in the early 1990s, it pits players against one another as they invade others' houses and attempt to steal money from their vaults, while also setting up traps and other obstacles to keep their own vaults safe.

In creating the game, Rohrer was influenced by his childhood fear of his house being robbed, numerous publicized shootings, and his own political views regarding gun rights and home invasions. During development and beta testing, the game went through several changes that increased its difficulty. It received mixed reviews from critics, with some praising the design and creativity, and others finding it hard to empathize with the game's intended message.

== Gameplay ==
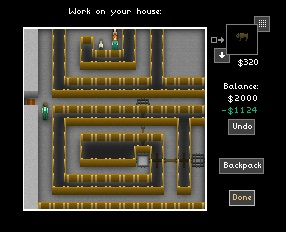
The player character reorganizes his house to protect his vault. His wife and children are visible in the top-center of the screen.

The Castle Doctrine incorporates elements of puzzle, strategy, stealth, and roguelike games, viewed from a 2D perspective. It focuses on maintaining and protecting a vault of money stored in one's house from intruders. These intruders are actually other players of the game; likewise, the player can invade others' houses and steal their money—presented in a list rather than found through exploration—in the same way. This list shows a predetermined three-name pseudonym of each player, the number of dollars contained in their vault, how many others have tried to rob it, and how many have died in the process. All deaths in the game are permanent; upon dying, the player must create a new character.

The player can protect their vault in a number of ways, such as building walls, keeping guard dogs, setting up traps such as electrified floors and bottomless pits, and giving guns to the player's family members so that they can defend the vault as well. The game does not punish the player for family members—by default, a wife and two children—being murdered by intruders; the player can even view footage of the incident afterwards. Rather, protecting the money is the goal that the game emphasizes. The player starts with $2,000 in cash and steals more from others' vaults; it can be used to purchase more objects to defend one's own vault. Additionally, a house is not accessible by thieves when its owner is retooling it for defense.

When invading another's house, the player can attempt to deter these defenses in such ways as smashing windows, dismantling walls, short-circuiting machines, and even drugging guard dogs with tainted meat, in addition to killing any residents that are armed. Reaching a vault is always possible with enough skill; the game forces players to escape their own traps before other players can access them. Being caught in one's own traps has the same consequence as any other trap in the game: permadeath.

== Development ==
The Castle Doctrine was created by indie developer Jason Rohrer; its ideas were drawn from Rohrer's childhood anxieties about his family's house being burgled, and his adult sense of responsibility over protecting his family. The game's central theme is the castle doctrine and includes the issue of gun rights; Rohrer created it partially as an "artistic statement" on defending one's family through violence. He summarized his goals with the game as creating something "that makes you feel violated and makes you want to protect stuff that’s yours, and puts you in the process of securing what’s yours." However, he has remarked that the consequence of making players feel hypocritical—since they are invading others' homes as well—was partially intentional and an "elegant" idea.

Rohrer noted in an interview his aversion to creating a "ridiculous caricature of some post-apocalyptic man’s world, where we’ll all just robbing each other," and instead called his game pre-apocalyptic in setting and style. In terms of aesthetics, Rohrer aimed for a "very clean, no frills, no fluff, no filler kind of design" that emphasized function in all of its objects. He has noted that some players have complained about not being able to decorate their houses non-functionally, but is unsympathetic, saying that the game is not FarmVille. The game was, however, influenced by Minecraft, which—while heavily tied to cosmetic decoration—involves similar themes of protecting one's creations from other players as in The Castle Doctrine.

Rohrer thought of adding family members for the player's character early in the game's development, but scrapped it at first because of the extra complexity and not knowing how to make them more than inanimate objects. After a dream, however, he was inspired to see if there was a practical way to implement them that would further the game's "moral dimension."

== Release ==
The Castle Doctrine was first released as a paid alpha and sold at half price from March 2013 until its official release on January 29, 2014. As was visible through its history of updates during beta testing, it went through several changes, primarily the increase of gameplay difficulty. One was the addition of dedicated "perma-perma-death" servers, where players could not even re-create characters after dying, in contrast to the game's generic "perma-death" servers. Another was "blueprints," which allow players to get a general sense of a house's layout before entering and thus encourage setting up puzzle-based—rather than luck-based—vault defenses. Rohrer did not, however, want the game to be impossible, so he took the step of forcing players to evade their own traps before the houses would be accessible to others. The game has been placed in the public domain and is hosted on SourceForge.

Upon release, the game's 50% discount was scaled back to 25% for one week. It has not gone on sale since, as Rohrer believes that "sales screw your fans" as they discourage buying games one wants during non-sale periods. Following the game's release, Rohrer used US$3,000 of alpha release earnings to fund a competition in which players could win money, paintings, gift cards, and other prizes by having the highest worth in-game houses. The highest prize awarded was US$316.

== Reception ==
Reception

Aggregate score
| Aggregator | Score |
|---|---|
| Metacritic | 58/100 |

Review scores
| Publication | Score |
|---|---|
| Destructoid | 7/10 |
| Game Informer | 7.0/10 |
| GameSpot | 4/10 |
| IGN | 4.5/10 |
| PC Gamer (US) | 85/100 |
| Polygon | 5.0/10 |

The Castle Doctrine received mixed reviews from critics, with a score on review aggregator Metacritic of 58/100. Patrick Carlson of PC Gamer reviewed the game well, responding positively to the game rewarding experimentation and being easy to understand, describing it as thoughtfully designed. Game Informer's Daniel Tack also rated the game well, commenting particularly on its creativity, stating, though, that he did not think the game was "deep enough to stay interesting for long." Writing for Destructoid, Patrick Hancock shared Tack's opinion that the game was a good experience, but said he would find it hard to recommend.

The web-video series Extra Credits recommended it on one of their "Games you might not have tried" episodes, praising it for challenging the player to examine their beliefs, and commenting that being good at the game itself "requires the same sort of paranoid genius that the game itself is trying to warn against."

Polygon's Russ Pitts found the game a frustrating exercise, his experience determined by the arbitrary quality of player-designed houses, and further obstructed by the harsh consequences of failure. Pitts felt the game valued its message over the player's time and yet found the message hard to take seriously; he would describe the game as the most disturbing he had ever played. Keza MacDonald, in her review at IGN, shared these frustrations, finding that tackling player-constructed houses made the game over-reliant on trial and error. She also found it hard to empathize with the small, pixelated characters, leading her to believe that the game failed in "communicating much of a message". Nick Capozzoli of GameSpot also gave the game a largely negative review, criticising the nihilistic feel, and saying that it did not bring out the emotions it was aimed to.
