= Novagen Software =

British software developer

Novagen Software Ltd
- Industry: Video games
- Headquarters: Birmingham, United Kingdom
- Products: Computer games

Novagen Software Ltd (commonly referred to as Novagen) was a British software company that developed and published a number of computer games for a variety of platforms during the 1980s and early 1990s.

The company was set up by Paul Woakes and Bruce Jordan and employed approximately 18 people. In addition to running Novagen, Paul Woakes also developed and programmed the vast majority of the company's products and the first version of a custom loading scheme that worked ten times faster than Commodore's own, which became Novaload.

== Games ==
- Encounter! (1983) Atari 8-bit, (1984) C64
- Mercenary (1985) Atari 8-bit, C64, C16, Plus/4, ZX Spectrum, Amstrad CPC, Amiga, Atari ST
  - Mercenary: The Second City (1986) expansion pack for Mercenary
- Mercenary Compendium Edition (1987) Mercenary + The Second City
- Backlash (1988) Amiga, Atari ST
- Battle Island (1988) C64
- Hell Bent (1989) Amiga, Atari ST
- Damocles: Mercenary II (1990) Amiga, Atari ST
  - Damocles: Mission Disk 1 (1991) Amiga, Atari ST
  - Damocles: Mission Disk 2 (1991) Amiga, Atari ST
- Damocles Compendium Edition (1991) Damocles + Mission Disk 1 + Mission Disk 2
- Encounter (1991) Amiga, Atari ST
- Mercenary III (1992) Amiga, Atari ST
