= Bigger Than Jesus (disambiguation) =

Bigger than Jesus is a misquote of a saying by John Lennon, see "More popular than Jesus"

== Theatre and TV ==
- Bigger Than Jesus: The Diary of a Rock and Roll Fan, Rick Emerson's one-man stage show, directed Joni DeRouchie
- Bigger than Jesus, a play by Rick Miller (comedian)
- 1 Leicester Square introduced Russell Brand as being "bigger than Jesus" in reference to the misquoted claim by John Lennon

== Games ==
- Chain World challenge GDC: The Game Design Challenge: Bigger Than Jesus Game Developers Conference

== Music ==
- Bigger Than Jesus, band of Steve Lucas of X (Australian band)

=== Albums ===
- Bigger than Jesus, fictional second album mentioned in the Simpsons episode Homer's Barbershop Quartet September 30, 1993
- Bigger than Jesus (album), a 1989 album by the Kalahari Surfers a.k.a. Warrick Sony

=== Songs ===
- "Bigger Than Jesus", single by Danbert Nobacon in 1987
- "Bigger Than Jesus", single by the Kalahari Surfers a.k.a. Warrick Sony from the 1989 album Bigger than Jesus
