= Muti Media =

Studio album by Kalahari Surfers
- Released: 6 January 2003
- Label: African Dope

Kalahari Surfers chronology
Akasic Record	Muti Media	Conspiracy of Silence

Muti Media is a 2003 album by the Kalahari Surfers, the recording identity of South African musician Warrick Sony. It features a sculpture by Brett Murray on the cover, and Zukile Malahlana from Marekta appears on the album.

== Personnel ==
- Xhosa vocals: Zukile Malahlana
- Piano: Murray Anderson
- Vocals and poem on "Durgas Belt": Lesego Rampolokeng
- Sample on "What have they Done To Me?" from "Shela" by Samuel Singo courtesy Gallo Records
- Sitar on "Secrecy of Silence": Jaya Lakshmi
- Tabla: Chaitanya Charanadas
- "Slow Speed" features Brother Sjambok of "Die Vos Broers"
- Clarinet on "Slow Speed": Joelle Chesselet
- Operatic voice on "Coptic": Juliana Venter
- "Herdsman" was originally recorded for Ochre and Water, a movie by Doxa Productions Himba.
- "Faust" was originally recorded for the Handspring/William Kentridge production of Faustus in Afrika; vocal by Jennifer Ferguson

== Track listing ==
1. "Djengele (the Generals)" 06:05
2. "The Generals Walk Free" 06:57
3. "Versatile Flying Options" 06:10
4. "Durga (Into The Light)" 05:36
5. "What Have They Done To You" 04:28
6. "The Equator (Umlamli)" 06:38
7. "The Secrecy Of Science" 06:37
8. "Coptic Handcross" 05:48
9. "Slow Speed" 05:53
10. "You're Breaking Up (Press The Hash Key)" 04:24
11. "Herdsman" 07:05
12. "The Quatar Depression Faust (Excerpt)" 07:58
