= Agitprop (disambiguation) =

Agitprop was originally an abbreviation for the departments of Agitation and Propaganda in the early Communist Party of the Soviet Union.

Agitprop may also refer to:

- Agit-Prop Records, a British record label
- Agitprop! Records, an American record label
- Agit-prop (band), a Finnish music group
- Agitprop (album), a 2012 album by the South African musician Warrick Sony
