= Zim Ngqawana =

South African flautist, saxophonist and composer

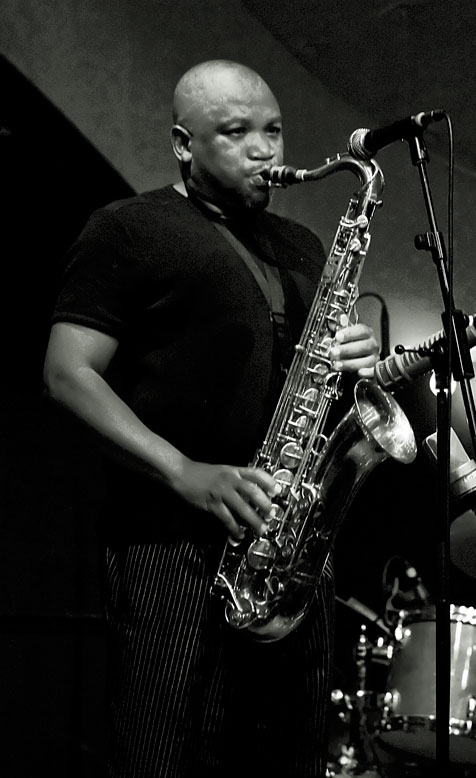
Zim Ngqawana in 2008.

Zim Ngqawana (25 December 1959 – 10 May 2011) was a South African flautist and saxophonist. He was later known as Zimology.

== Biography ==
The youngest of five children, Ngqawana started playing flute at the age of 21, eventually becoming proficient on alto, tenor and baritone saxophone as well. He dropped out of school prior to meeting university entrance requirements but won entrance to a place at Rhodes University. He later studied for a diploma in Jazz Studies at the University of Natal. He was offered scholarships to the Max Roach/Wynton Marsalis jazz workshop and later a scholarship to the University of Massachusetts Amherst, where he studied with jazz musicians Archie Shepp and Yusef Lateef.

After his return to South Africa in the 1990s Ngqawana worked with South African jazz musicians Hugh Masekela and Abdullah Ibrahim. He collaborated with Bjorn Ole Solburg on the Norwegian San Ensemble album, San Song. On that album he wrote two songs, "San Song" and "Migrant Workers". He toured the United States with his band "Ingoma" in 1995, and he made an appearance at Black History Week in Chicago.

He performed a duet with poet Lefifi Tladi in the documentary Giant Steps (2005), directed by Geoff Mphakati and Aryan Kaganof. In January 2010, Ngqawana's Zimology Institute was vandalised by scrap metal thieves. He performed a duet concert in the rubble of the vandalised building with Cape Town pianist Kyle Shepherd. This performance was filmed as The Exhibition Of Vandalizimiop by Aryan Kaganof. The Vandalizim concerts were subsequently performed at the Gallery MOMO in Johannesburg and at a scrapyard in Stellenbosch, organised by Stellenbosch University's music department and DOMUS.

== Death ==
Ngqawana suffered from stroke during a rehearsal and was taken to Helen Joseph hospital and succumbed to bleeding on the brain. He is survived by his wife and five children.

== Discography ==
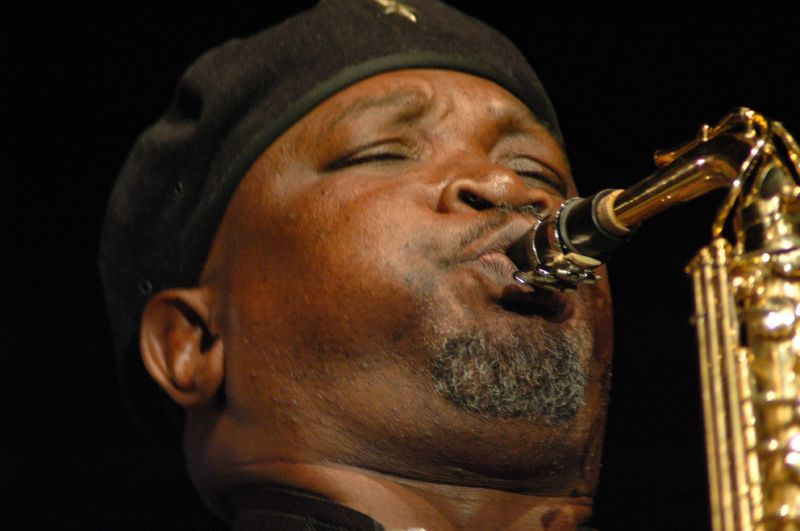
Zim Ngqawana in 2006.

- San Song (1996, with the Norwegian San Ensemble)
- Zimology (1998)
- Ingoma (1999)
- Zimphonic Suites (2001)
- Vadzimu (2004)
- The Best of Zim Ngqawana
- Zimology Quartet (2007) - Live at Bird's Eye, Switzerland
- Zimology In Concert (USA) - Featuring the UT FACULTY ENSEMBLE (2008)
- Anthology of Zimology - Volume One (2009)- Recorded Live in Heidelberg, Germany, 2008
- 50th Birthday Celebration (2010) - Recorded Live at The Linder Auditorium, Johannesburg
- Exhibition of Vandalism
