= Aryan Kaganof =

South African film maker, novelist, poet and fine artist

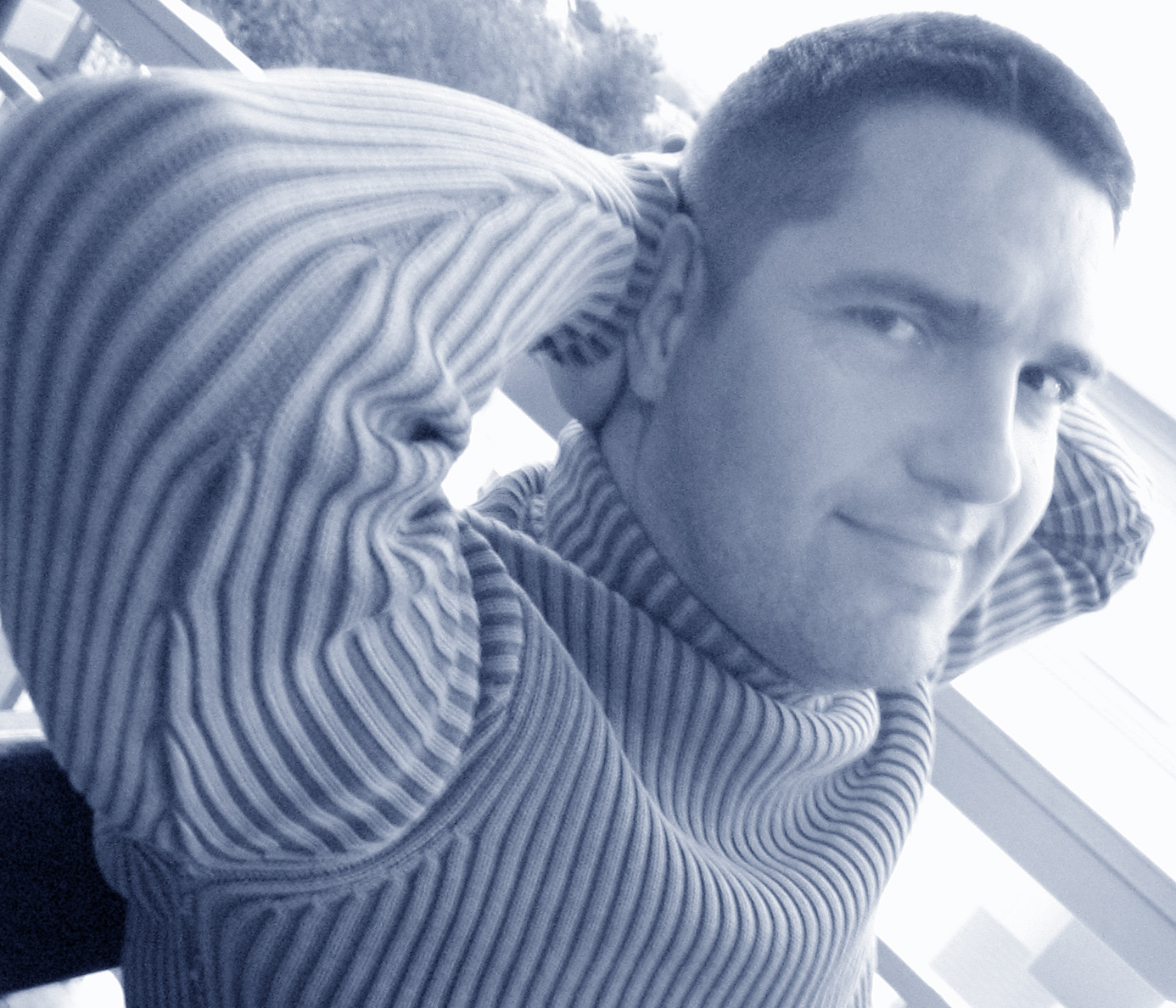
- Born: Ian Kerkhof; South Africa
- Other name: AK47
- Occupations: film maker, novelist, poet, fine artist
- Years active: 1983–present
- Awards: Golden Calf (Dutch Film Festival)

Aryan Kaganof (born 1964) is a South African film maker, novelist, poet and fine artist. In 1999 he changed his name to Aryan Kaganof.

== Partial filmography ==
- 1992: Kyodai Makes the Big Time (91min, Netherlands), drama feature film. The film won the Golden Calf for Best Feature Film award.
- 1994 Ten Monologues from the Lives of the Serial Killers (60min, Netherlands) based on the writings of J. G. Ballard, Henry Rollins and Roberta Lannes; plus actual monologues by Charles Manson, Edmund Emil Kemper and Kenneth Bianchi.
- 1999 Shabondama Elegy (aka Tokyo Elegy) (With writings by Jack Henry Abbott (Belly of the Beast) and Tricia Warden, (Attack God Inside). Winner of The Golden Calf Special Jury Prize at the Grand Prix of Dutch cinema.
- 2002 Western 4.33 (32min, 35mm, Namibia-Netherlands) about the genocide of the Herero people by the German colonisers (Best Video Made in Africa at 12th Milan Festival of African Cinema) (Best Documentary at 1st Africa and The Islands International Film Festival, Réunion) Official Selection Berlinale Forum
- 2003 Sharp Sharp! - the kwaito story (25min, DVCam, South Africa-Netherlands) featuring Zola, TKZee, Oskido, Mzambiya, Don Laka and Mandoza
- 2005 Giant Steps (co-directed with Geoff Mphakati) (52min, DVCam, South Africa) a documentary portrait of revolutionary poets Lefifi Tladi, Lesego Rampolokeng, Kgafela oa Magogodi, Afurakan, Mac Manaka with music by Johnny Mbizo Dyani and Zim Ngqawana
- 2007 Unyazi of the Bushveld (45min, DVCam, South Africa) a documentary about the first symposium of electronic music ever held in Africa featuring Warrick Sony (Kalahari Surfers), Pauline Oliveros, Zim Ngqawana, George Lewis, Matthew Ostrowski, Lukas Ligeti, Francisco Lopez
- 2007 SMS Sugar Man (87min, South Africa) the first full-length feature film shot entirely on cell phone cameras, starring Luthuli Dlamini, John Matshikiza, Leigh Graves, Deja Bernhardt and Ryan Fortune.
- 2009 Civilization and Other Chimeras Observed During the Making of an Exceptionally Artistic Feature Film (80min, Netherlands) documentary on the making of Winterland, the first feature film by fine artist Dick Tuinder.
- 2013 An Inconsolable Memory (99 minutes, South Africa), Kaganof's film about the Eoan Group. Combining rare archival film footage of District Six and Eoan's opera performances with contemporary documentation and interviews.

== Novels ==
- Hectic! (Pine Slopes Publications, 2002)
- Uselessly (Jacana, 2006)
- 12shooters (Pine Slopes Publications, 2007)

== Poetry ==
- Drive Through Funeral (Pine Slopes Publications, 2003)
- The Freedom Fighter (Illuseum Press, 2004)
- Jou Ma Se Poems (Pine Slopes Publications, 2005)
- The Ballad of Sugar Moon and Coffin Deadly (Pine Slopes Publications, 2007)
