= One party =

One party or one-party state may refer to:

- One-party state, a state in which a single political party controls the ruling system
- One-party government, a government formed in a multi-party state that consists exclusively of representatives of one party
- The ONE Party, a political party in New Zealand
- In law, a party to a legal action or contract
- In United States telephone call recording law, a one-party consent state
- One Party State (album), a 2010 album

== See also ==
- Dominant-party system
- Party
- Party system
- Political party
