= Gangsters (play) =

Gangsters is a three character play written by South African playwright Maishe Maponya. The play is set in Soweto in the 1970s.

== Synopsis ==
The main character is Masechaba (Mother of Nation) a black African poet whose activist poetry attracts the attention of a senior Police official, Major Whitebeard. Whitebeard and his subordinate, black officer named Jonathan interrogates Masechaba and warns her to stop reciting her poetry. The play illustrates quarrels and rebellions of the indigenous population. Whitebeard refers to her poem called, "The Spirit of Nation" and tries to convince her that her poetry causes hate towards the South African government. He tries to persuade Masechaba to write about flowers, beautiful scenery, and happiness to help soothe tensions in Soweto. Masechaba lashes back that all the flowers are dead, her people are impoverished, and that her people are being slaughtered in the streets.

Masechaba argues that her poetry depicts the truth of the situation in South Africa and claims that her poetry is not inflammatory. When Masechaba persists in reciting her work, Whitebeard gives her a "banning order" forbidding her to recite her poetry, to gather in large numbers, requiring her to report to local police and to follow a strict curfew. When Masechaba breaks the terms of the banning order she is seized, interrogated and tortured to death by Jonathan under Whitebeard's orders. The two then discuss how they can cover up Masechaba's murder as they had done so many times before. The play ends with Whitebeard reassuring Jonathan.

== Reception ==
A New York Times article reviewing Gangsters connected Masechaba character and Stephen Biko; an anti-apartheid activist in South Africa. Biko was beaten to death while in custody of authorities in a South African prison.
