= Turiya Magadlela =

South African artist

Turiya Magadlela, daughter of Fikile Magadlela is a South African artist. She was born in 1978 in Johannesburg, South Africa. She is known for using common cloths, from pantyhose to sheeting and correctional service uniforms in her works. In 2018 she was featured in a top 10 list of African artists to invest in by TimesLive.

== Early life ==
Turiya studied at National School of arts (1997, Funda Community College (1998) and the University of Johannesburg (1999–2001) in South Africa. In 2004, she completed post-graduate research study at the Rijksakademie van beeldende kunsten in Amsterdam.

== Career and exhibitions ==
Magadlela uses panty hoses – a garment with strong ties to matters of sexuality, gender, and the geopolitical exploitation of natural resources, to make her artwork. Her subject matter moves between articulations of personal experiences of women and motherhood and narratives from black South African history. Through her work, Magadlela engages in a conversation on the colonization of black bodies and women.

Magadlela has had solo exhibitions at the Johannesburg Art Gallery, Museum Africa and at Blank projects. Magadlela has participated in several solo and group exhibitions, both locally and internationally including Blue Black, curated by Glenn Ligon (Pulitzer Arts Foundation 2017), Simple Passion, Complex Vision: The Darryl Atwell Collection (Gantt Centre 2017), The Past is Present (Jack Shainman Gallery, The Armory Show in New York City in 2017, Les jour qui vient’ curated by Marie-Ann Yemsi at Galeries Lafayette in 2017, Blackness in Abstraction (Pace Gallery, 2016), The Quiet Violence of Dreams (Stevenson, 2016) and The Grote Oversteek (Stedelijk Museum, Netherlands).

In 2002 Magadlela won the Absa L'Atelier Art Competition and was selected as Top 100 Best National Artists. The following year she was awarded the Goethe Institut and Johannesburg Art Gallery Young Artist Award. In 2015 she was awarded the FNB Art Prize. In 2018 she was shortlisted for the Jean-François Prat Prize.

== Awards ==
- 2002 ABSA L’Atelier, Top 100 Best National Artists
- 2003 Goethe Institut and Johannesburg Art Gallery Young Artist Award
- 2015 FNB Art Prize.
- 2018 Top 10 African Artists to Invest in Now by TimesLive.
- 2018 Jean-François Prat Prize (shortlisted)

== Selected solo and group exhibitions ==
- 2023 – When Angels Speak of Love, Triangle Art Space, NY curated by Charles Moore.
- 2020 – Mirror Mirror: LatchKey Ny, NY
- 2019 – Mashadi WouldSay..., MSGSU Resim ve Heykel Muzesi, Santiyesi, Istanbul, Turkey
- 2017 – The Armory Show, Solo Exhibit for the Armory Show Presents, New York City
- 2015 – Impilo ka Lova, Blankprojects, Cape Town, South Africa; Kaffersheet, Johannesburg Art Gallery, Johannesburg, South Africa.
- 2015 – Imihuzuko (for the FNB Art Prize), FNB Joburg Art Fair, Johannesburg, South Africa
- 2012 – Everybody knows uFeela, Blank projects, Cape Town, South Africa.
- 2001–2002 – Activate Architects, Johannesburg, South Africa
- 2001 – Generator's Art Space, Johannesburg, South Africa.

== Collections ==
Kunsthalle Krems, Brooklyn Museum; LACMA Los Angeles Contemporary Museum of Art; UMOCA Utah Museum of Contemporary Art; Sugar Hill Museum, Harlem, NY; UT Black Arts and Studies; Hearst Collection; Amir Shariat Collection; Adjmi Collection; Roux Art Collection; Princeton University Art Museum; African Art Museum, MOCAK Krakow, Poland.
