= Own Affairs =

Studio album by Kalahari Surfers
- Released: 12 December 1984
- Label: Recommended Records

Kalahari Surfers chronology
Own Affairs	Living in the Heart of the Beast

Own Affairs was, in 1984, the first full-length album by the Kalahari Surfers, the recording identity of South African musician Warrick Sony.

Sony had worked as a freelance sound engineer in the South African film industry, and used this to acquire many of the sound samples he later used in his music. Shifty Records tried to release Own Affairs, but could not find a vinyl plant which would press it. Chris Cutler's London-based Recommended Records pressed the album, the start of a long-standing alliance. Own Affairs was hailed as breathtaking, innovative and humorous by the Weekly Mail. The Sunday Times called it "a music born from the spilled seed of our national sickness and nurtured to nightmarehood in the moral drought of daily life/politics".

== Contributors ==
- Rick Van Heerden: saxophone
- Anne Botha: voice
- Brian Rath: drums

== Track listing ==
1. "Free State Fence" 03:18
2. "The Surfer" 02:06
3. "Prayer For Civilisation" 05:21
4. "Hillbrow 1" 05:42
5. "Hillbrow 2" 02:07
6. "Hippo In Town" 02:55
7. "Independence Day" 06:35
8. "Don't Dance" 02:54
9. "Crossed Cheques" 03:34
10. "September 84" 02:45
