= Living in the Heart of the Beast (album) =

Studio album by Kalahari Surfers
- Released: 12 December 1985
- Label: Recommended Records

Kalahari Surfers chronology
Own Affairs	Living in the Heart of the Beast	Sleep Armed

Living in the Heart of the Beast was, in 1985, the second full-length album by the Kalahari Surfers, the recording identity of South African musician Warrick Sony. The album title was taken from the title of a Tim Hodgkinson composition, "Living in the Heart of the Beast" on the Henry Cow album In Praise of Learning. Jon Savage wrote in the New Statesman that it was a "success", praised its "viciously critical (and historically intelligent) lyrics", and compared it with early Zappa. The NME called it "brave".

== Track listing ==
1. "Grensvegter" – 06:24
2. "Europeans" – 04:35
3. "Safety Seat" – 04:08
4. "1999" – 03:59
5. "Township Beat" – 05:22
6. "Zola and the Budget" – 02:28
7. "Song for Magnus" – 03:05
8. "Reasonable Men" – 04:11
9. "Play It Backwards" – 03:42
