= One Party State (album) =

Studio album by Kalahari Surfers
- Released: 18 February 2010
- Label: Microdot

Kalahari Surfers chronology
Panga Management	One Party State	Agitprop

One Party State is a 2010 album by the Kalahari Surfers, the recording identity of South African musician Warrick Sony. It was released on Microdot and debuted at the African Soul Rebels Tour in the UK alongside Oumou Sangaré & Orchestre Poly-Rythmo De Cotonou. It features Sowetan poet Lesego Rampolokeng on four tracks. The Mail & Guardian called it "a politically drenched album... track for track the most solid South African release of 2010".

== Track listing ==
1. "Blackness and Light" 04:57
2. "Cutting Yourself" 03:52
3. "A New Kind Of Leader" 04:05
4. "Gathering Data" 04:02
5. "Straight To The Hips" 03:44
6. "Relax" 04:14
7. "Parts Of Northern Natal" 05:10
8. "Every Eventuality" 03:42
9. "Frontiers Of Madness" 03:41
10. "Child Soldier" 05:00
11. "One Party State" 04:28
12. "Intimidasie" 05:14
13. "Fish Effect" 04:28
14. "In Transition" (Featuring Lesego Rampolokeng) 04:03
15. "Minority Report" (Featuring Lesego Rampolokeng) 04:00
16. "Youth League" 03:18
17. "Play Around With the Buttons" 04:12
