= Sleep Armed =

Studio album by Kalahari Surfers
- Released: 11 November 1988
- Label: Recommended Records

Kalahari Surfers chronology
Living in the Heart of the Beast	Sleep Armed	Bigger Than Jesus

Sleep Armed was, in 1988, the third full-length album by the Kalahari Surfers, the recording identity of South African musician Warrick Sony. It has been called "the best snapshot we have of South Africa at the time, right down to the jacket photo of rich surfers on Umhlanga Roxx, a posh White beach in Durban".

== Personnel ==
Composed & produced by Warrick Sony except "Houghton Parents" and "Fraud City" which were written by Warrick Sony and Hamish Davidson. Performed by the Kalahari Surfers: Warrick Sony, Brain Rath (drums) & Hamish Davidson (guitar, saxophone, brass).

== Track listing ==
1. "Prologue" 00:54
2. "Houghton Parents" 04:10
3. "Potential Aggressor #1" 00:57
4. "Golden Rendezvous" 04:21
5. "Underground" 02:56
6. "This Land" 03:29
7. "Fraud City" 03:16
8. "Hoe Ry Die Boere" 01:33
9. "Mafeking Road" 05:22
10. "The Maids Day Off" 03:13
11. "Maids Day Off" #2 03:49
12. "Greatest Hits" 01:08
13. "Teargas" 02:09
14. "Another Potential Aggressor" 00:31
15. "Brighter Future" 02:14
16. "Healthy Way of Life" 03:41
