= Lefifi Tladi =

South African painter, poet, and musician

- Born: 4 January 1949 (age 77); Pretoria, South Africa
- Education: Gerlesborg School of Fine Art
- Occupations: Painter, poet, sculptor, musician
- Awards: 2021 SALA Literary lifetime achievement award
- Website: lefifitladi.com

Lefifi Tladi (born 4 January 1949) is a South African painter, poet, sculptor and musician. As a member of the black consciousness movement he was exiled from South Africa in 1976. He lived in exile, primarily in Stockholm, Sweden, until the abolition of apartheid, and in 1997 returned to South Africa for the first time in over 20 years. In 2021, he was awarded the lifetime achievement award by the South African Literary Awards.

== Biography ==
Lefifi Tladi was born in 1949 in the township of Lady Selborne, Pretoria, South Africa. His involvement in the cultural world started in 1966 when he co-founded a youth club known as De-Olympia in the township of Ga-Rankuwa, north-west of Pretoria. The club hosted workshops, recited poetry, danced and music. The group subsequently formed a jazz band, Malombo Jazz Messengers, later renamed Dashiki. During the 1970s Lefifi started to get more involved in the Black Consciousness Movement via its cultural events where he performed with Dashiki. Dashiki also became regulars at the United States Embassy's jazz appreciation sessions under the management of Geoff Matlherane Mphakathi.

In 1971, De-Olympia was transformed into an art studio, gallery and museum of contemporary Black art. The aim was to exhibit art, stimulate research, and encourage the documentation of African arts. Among others, Lefifi worked with Motlhabane Mashiangwako, Victor Mkhumbuza, Fikile Magadlela, and Harry Moyaga. They also organized numerous Black art exhibitions and workshops at some of the major Black universities and schools. This was in response to the "Bantu Educations" discouragement of Black people's creativity. After being active for three years the apartheid authorities forced the museum to close down in 1974.

In 1976, Lefifi was arrested and detained by the security police for participating in the Soweto uprising. He was kept in solitary confinement for over two months before he was released on bail. When he was out on bail he decided to not stay in South Africa due to the severity of the charges he was facing and fled across the border to Botswana. While in Botswana he and fellow artists established the Tuka Cultural Unit, a cultural formation meant for organizing group exhibitions as well as sustaining working relations with artists in South Africa. In 1977, they took part in the month-long event, Festac '77 – the pan-African international festival of arts and culture in Lagos, Nigeria.

Lefifi got in contact with a Swedish diplomat while holding an exhibition at the Botswana National Museum in 1980. This encounter led to Lefifi receiving a scholarship to study fine arts and art history at the Gerlesborg School of Fine Art in Stockholm. He moved to Stockholm the following year.

While in Sweden Lefifi continued to be active in anti apartheid movement. In He participated in the exhibition "Art Against Apartheid" in Amsterdam, Holland and the SIDA-sponsored "End White Rule in Black South Africa" exhibition.

In 1997, Lefifi returned to South Africa for the first time following the abolishment of Apartheid.

In 2005, filmmaker Aryan Kaganof made the documentary "Giant Steps" about the life of Lefifi Tladi along with South African poets Lesego Rampolokeng, Kgafela oa Magogodi, Afurakan, Mac Manaka.

Since 2016, he lives in Stockholm full time and continues to exhibit and host poetry and art workshops. He is passionate about education and is involved with various art education projects in South Africa from a distance.

=== Oil Paintings ===
Kalture(Culture) a 2005 painting by Lefifi Tladi that is on ode to the sonic artists and the instruments they play.	Untitled. An exercise painting on an undulating surface, which showcases the explorative approach that Tladi applies to creating artworks	Oil on canvas Painting dedicated to fellow artist Ezrom Legae.
Oil Painting on Canvas dimensions 63x113, An exploration on centering myths in African Art percepectives

== Notable exhibitions ==
- "Mosima Motlhaela" at Thupa National Museum, Gaborone, Botswana - 1980
- "Soweto Flames of Resistance" at Oslo House, Norway - 1980
- "Ting-Ting-Pere Krag" at African Centre, London, England - 1982
- "Afrika Tage" at Pavillion, Hannover, West Germany - 1982
- "Schwarze Kunst aus Sud Afrika" touring West Germany - 1984
- "Boomerang to the Source" at Battersea Art Centre, London, England - 1984
- "Mötesplats" at Kulturhuset, Stockholm, Sweden - 1984
- "Art Against Apartheid" at Nieuwe Kerk Dam, Amsterdam, Holland - 1985
- "End White Rule in Black South-Africa" at SIDA U-Forum, Stockholm, Sweden - 1985
- "Images in Black" at De Butcht, Leiden, Holland - 1985
- "Munti Wa Marumo – Boomerang to the Source" at Brixton Art Gallery, London, England - 1986
- "Exil" at Haus 3, Hamburg, Germany - 1986
- "Wir sind die Elefanten" and "Bilder und Skulpturen aus Azania" at Solidarische Welt, C.U.B.A., Münster, Germany - 1986
- "Voices From Exile" at Union Art Gallery, Milwaukee, U.S.A. - 1987
- "A Travelling Exhibition" at Union Art Gallery, Morgan State University, Baltimore, U.S.A. - 1987
- "Alphabets of Fire" at Capitol Cost Graphic Gallery, Washington DC, U.S.A. - 1987
- "Sexhexhexhe" at Unisa Art Gallery, Pretoria, South Africa - 1995\
- "Oto la Dimo" : joint retrospective exhibition of Lefifi Tladi & Motlhabane Mashiangwako : Unisa Art Gallery, 5 February 1998-21 March 1998, Johannesburg International Airport, 22 April-25 May 1998
- "Windows" Väsby Konsthall, Sweden - 2007
- "Mphopole" : Lefifi Tladi Exhibition" at the National Cultural History Museum, Pretoria, South Africa - 2009
- "Lättare än Maskros" at SAAB Art Gallery, Terrassen, Linköping, Sweden - 2018
