= Diamond Trust of London =

2012 turn-based strategy video game

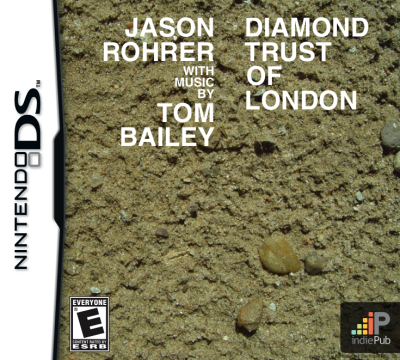
- Developer: Jason Rohrer
- Publisher: indiePub
- Composer: Tom Bailey
- Platform: Nintendo DS
- Release: August 28, 2012
- Genre: Turn-based strategy
- Modes: Single-player, multiplayer

Diamond Trust of London is a turn-based strategy video game by Jason Rohrer, with music by Tom Bailey. Following a crowdfunding campaign on Kickstarter the game was published by indiePub and released for the Nintendo DS on August 28, 2012. The game has been placed in the public domain and is hosted on SourceForge.

Inspired by German-style board games, Diamond Trust of London is played between two players, each controlling a diamond trading company. The game is set in 2000, before the implementation of the Kimberley Process Certification Scheme to curb the blood diamond trade, and the player's aim is to extract diamonds from Angola over the nine turns which comprise a game. To extract the most diamonds and win, players resort to a combination of bribery and deception.

First pitched in 2009, Diamond Trust of London went through a protracted development process, going through two publishers and taking over three years to reach the market. To raise capital for the game's manufacture, Rohrer launched a Kickstarter campaign, where it became the first successfully crowdfunded Nintendo DS game. Critics had reservations about the amount of content on offer and the game's user interface, but were appreciative of the psychological gameplay and the themes explored.

== Gameplay ==
Agents from the Diamond Trust of London are dispatched to Angola. One agent is presented with the opportunity to bribe the UN inspector.

Players control one of two diamond trading companies: the eponymous Diamond Trust of London or an unnamed Antwerp-based competitor. The game is set in 2000 and the aim is to extract diamonds from Angola before the Kimberley Process Certification Scheme is put in place. The winner is the one who finishes the game with the most diamonds after nine turns. Each turn, players decide where to send their three agents. They can be sent to six different Angolan regions to extract diamonds, or recalled to the player's headquarters to deposit extracted diamonds. Players make decisions in secret, and both sets of decisions are resolved on the game board simultaneously.

The competitors must decide how much to pay each agent, and how much to pay the local guide in that region. If there are competing offers for the same guide in a particular region, the highest offer receives all of that region's diamonds in an all-pay auction. Competing agents can be bribed to reveal inside information regarding the competitor's decisions. Complicating matters further is the UN inspector, who moves at random between regions on each turn. The inspector blocks all diamond extraction from the region in which he is present, and can confiscate diamonds from agents within that region. Like other agents though, the inspector can be bribed and directed to regions of a player's choice.

In single-player mode, the player competes against an AI opponent available at various difficulty levels. Multiplayer gameplay includes support for DS Download Play, allowing an entire group of players to play from only one game card.

== Development ==
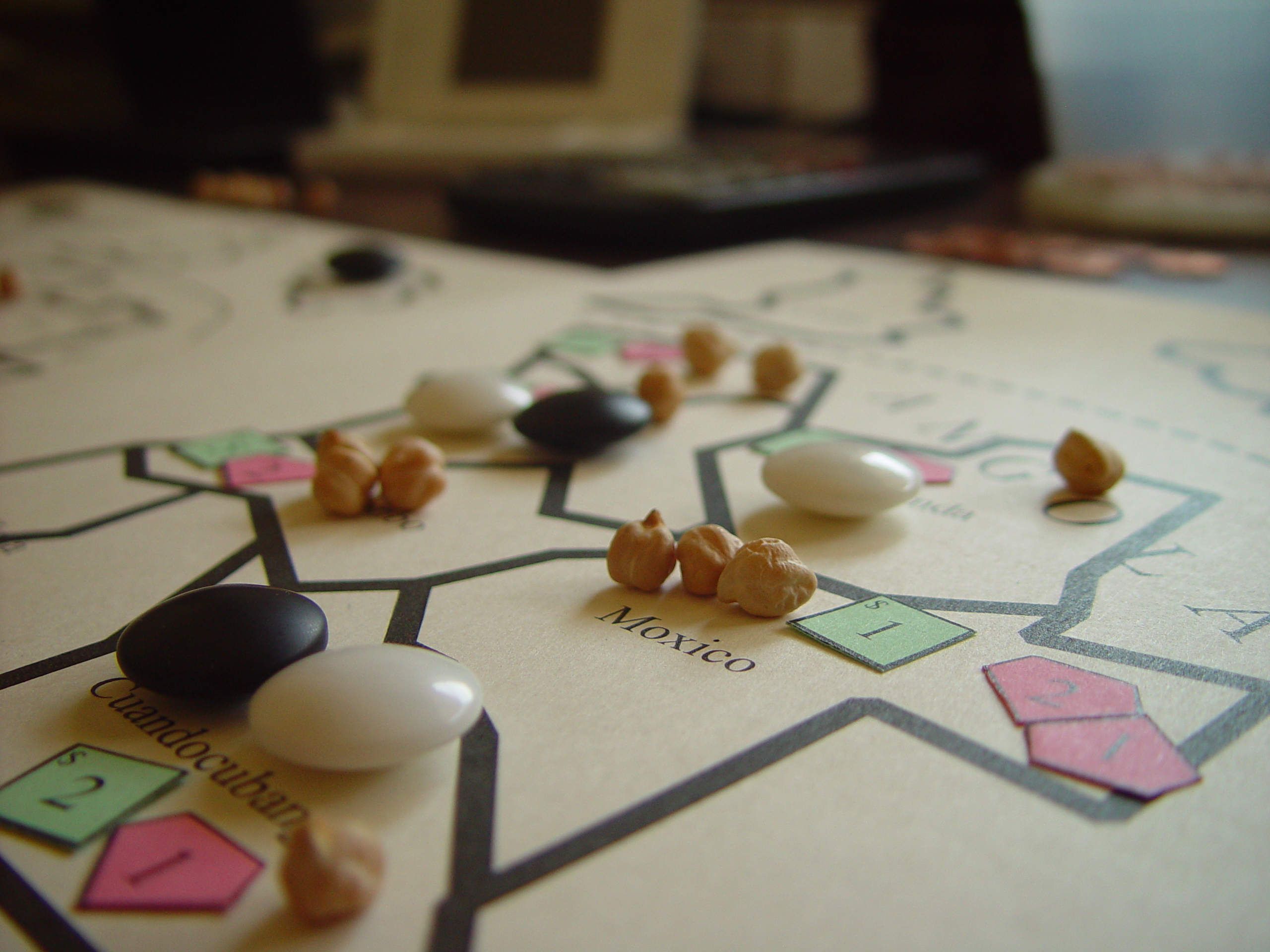
Rohrer prototyped the game on paper.

Jason Rohrer was inspired by German-style board games to build a turn-based strategy game. He wanted to harness the unique qualities that a video game could bring to a board game, and so focused on their ability to deliver different views of the board to each player. He wanted to create a game which explored "knowledge chains", where the player must not only be aware of his knowledge and movements on the board, but also how much of that has been exposed to the opponent. In March 2009, he was invited by publisher Majesco to pitch an idea for a Nintendo DS game, and keeping these mechanics in mind, he pitched a game called Deception. In Deception, two players would play one half of a married couple, with the aim to gather damaging evidence regarding their spouse's infidelities as ammunition for a forthcoming divorce case. Majesco rejected this concept as being "too sensitive a subject for the DS market".

Rohrer later transferred the themes of Deception onto a framework around corporate espionage and the blood diamond trade. Though not particularly concerned about blood diamonds, and wary of the game being perceived as a finger-wagging exercise, he felt that the setting would give an "extra oomph to the game's seedy mechanics". Instead of being an overt protest against the blood diamond trade, the game would explore the psychology of the industry through its game mechanics, causing players to reflect after a game on their decisions made within it. Majesco greenlit this, and in July 2009, a publishing contract was signed. Rohrer began work on Diamond Trust of London as a pen and paper prototype to iron out the design before committing to code. By December, the game was in a fully playable state, lacking only the soundtrack and tutorial. Majesco, however, decided to back away from a physical cartridge release, and pushed instead for a DSiWare download version. Rohrer disagreed, believing that the smaller DSiWare market would limit the game's audience; Majesco, on the other hand, was not willing to invest in the manufacturing of cartridges without strong pre-order numbers. The company made the game available to GameStop to gauge pre-order interest, stating that 3,000 pre-orders would be necessary for a cartridge release. Diamond Trust generated only 23 pre-orders, and in 2010, the Majesco agreement was terminated.

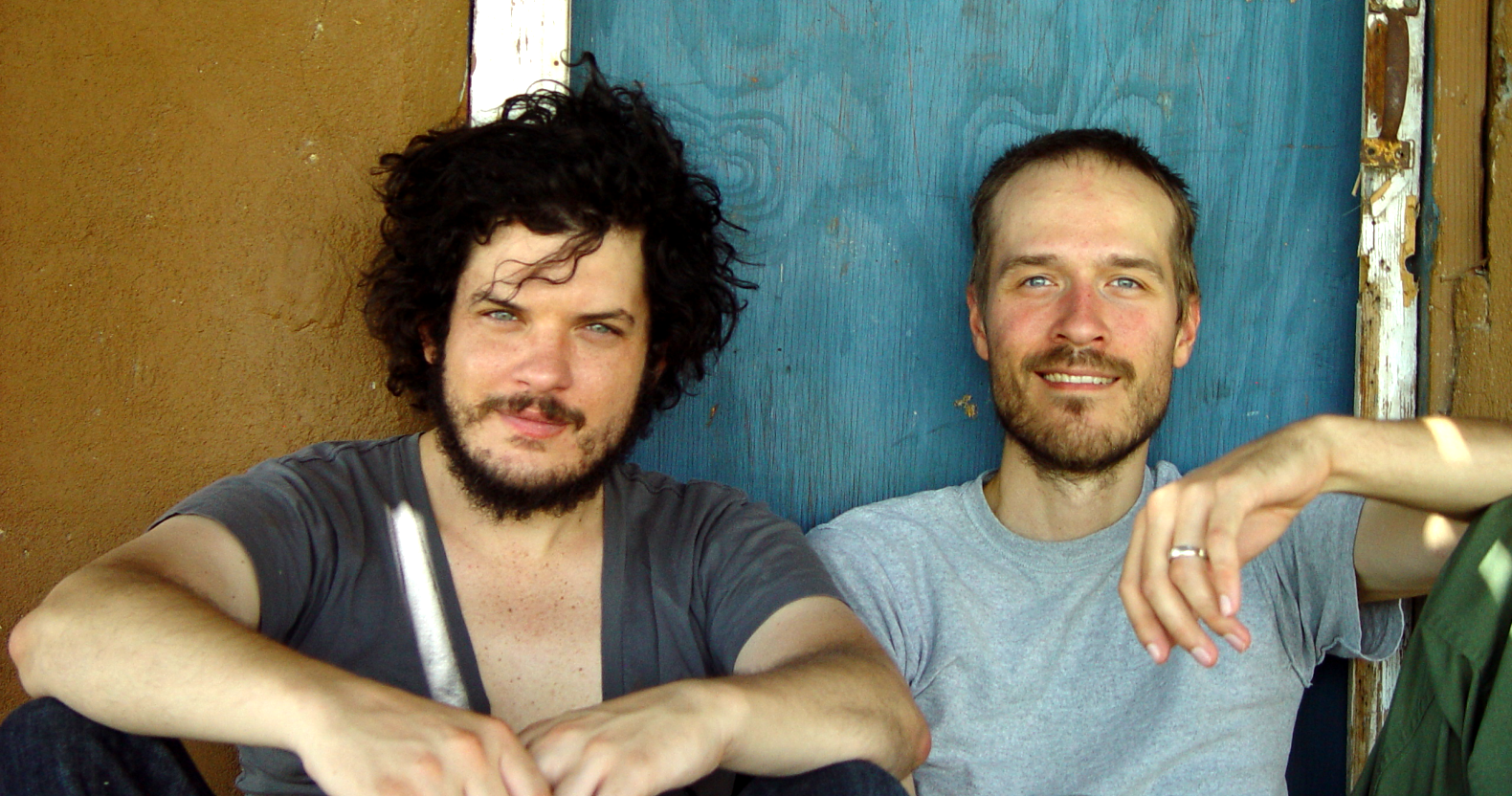
This photograph of Tom Bailey and Jason Rohrer is on the rear cover.

Bailey composed initial musical sketches to act as a guide for the loops he had to create for the game's music generation engine.

Lacking a publisher for Diamond Trust of London, Rohrer moved onto other projects such as Inside a Star-Filled Sky and Sleep is Death. He also took on work at Gun, a video games consultancy firm, and there he made contact with Mark Seremet, CEO of Zoo Publishing. Zoo was interested in pursuing Diamond Trust of London as a limited physical release on their indiePub label, and so work on the game resumed. To provide the game's soundtrack, Rohrer approached his friend and former bandmate, Tom Bailey. This was the first time that Rohrer had collaborated with others on his games. He cited this collaboration as helping to "restore [his] creative momentum" for the project. To avoid hearing exactly the same music every time the game is played, Rohrer developed a music generation engine which would arrange Bailey-composed loops procedurally depending on the game's state. If the lid of the Nintendo DS is closed with headphones plugged in while the game is still running, it will act as a random music generator. Rohrer's previous project, Inside a Star Filled Sky, had used entirely computer generated music, but he felt that the thematic demands of Diamond Trust of London required Bailey's handcrafted compositions and musicianship.

Jason Rohrer discusses the game for the Kickstarter campaign.

By July 2011, Rohrer had submitted a beta version of the game for Nintendo approval. This was followed up with the master version in October. An issue raised during the approval process was Rohrer's desire to credit Bailey on the game's cover, which Nintendo rejected. He got around this by officially naming the game Jason Rohrer with Music by Tom Bailey: Diamond Trust of London. In May 2012, the game was ready for manufacturing. However, due to changing market conditions, Zoo Publishing was no longer able to afford the manufacturing of cartridges given the large minimum order of 6,000 units that Nintendo required, and so, Rohrer turned to the crowdfunding platform Kickstarter.

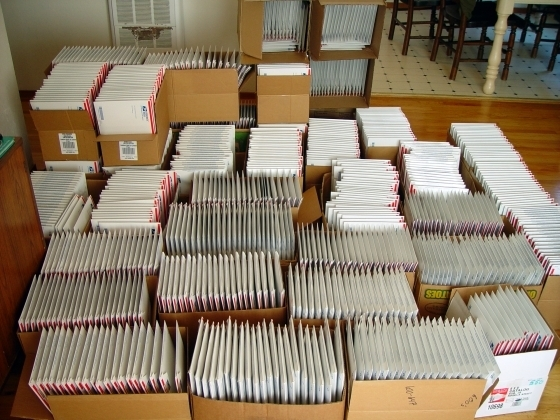
The game ready to ship for its Kickstarter backers

Rohrer launched the Kickstarter campaign on May 9, 2012, looking to raise $78,715; the campaign closed on May 26, 2012, after raising $90,118 from 1,305 backers. This allowed manufacturing to proceed, and Diamond Trust of London became the first successfully crowdfunded Nintendo DS game. By mid-July, the 6,000 cartridges had been manufactured by Nintendo in Japan, and in August, they arrived at Rohrer's home in California. As he was packaging the cartridges personally, it allowed him to release a special signed and numbered limited edition of 1000 copies, bundled with mystery bonuses. The game was released on August 28, 2012, and as customers received their copies, they revealed the contents of the limited edition. Jason Cipriano at MTV Multiplayer received, alongside his limited edition, postage stamps and a coin from countries featured in the game, and four actual diamonds.

== Reception ==
Reception

Review scores
Publication	Score
Edge	6/10
GamesTM	6/10
Nintendo Gamer	66/100
Paste	8.0/10.0

Diamond Trust of London received few reviews, and they were generally mixed. Critics enjoyed the gameplay, but found that the game required a human opponent for it to shine, with the single-player element acting merely as a practice mode. Nintendo Gamer found the game "mind-bending", likening its cycle of bluffs and double-bluffs to the Ouroboros. GamesTM enjoyed the experience of "trying to outwit and deceive a friend", but found achieving victory over-reliant on control of the UN inspector. Paste praised the support for DS Download Play functionality as generous, and described games of Diamond Trust of London as "fabulous palate cleansers" in between board game sessions. They also observed that during these games, much of a player's personality would be expressed through the moves they made.

Commenting on a preview build, Nintendo World Report highlighted the game's music, describing it as a "wonderfully eclectic mix", and "a constantly evolving ambient soundscape". MTV Multiplayer, while finding the music "a little out of place", still found it "really good", and believed that players would find themselves "zoning out, enjoying the music without even realizing it" as they waited for their next turn.

GamesTM felt that the game did not have sufficient content to justify a full-price retail release, being more suited instead to a budget-priced app. The publication described Diamond Trust of London as "a fantastic iOS strategy game. On the DS." Similarly, Nintendo Gamer called it a "worthwhile, if insubstantial game". The user interface was described as confusing by Nintendo Gamer, and while Edge felt that the interface was "simple to the point of crudity", it could also be "opaque and cluttered, making a reasonably complex game seem even more so". Edge concluded that if the player can get through these issues, there is "an acute psychological game to be played".

Fellow game developer Molleindustria named Diamond Trust of London as one of his top games of 2012, describing it as Rohrer's "most elegantly designed game to date". They highlighted how it critiques the blood diamond trade by using game mechanics that present "the world from the cynical, detached perspective of the Homo economicus", rather than by lecturing the player. Paste echoed these thoughts, stating that the game offered "no overt judgments" on the diamond trade, but had mechanics that paint it as "one that encourages and maybe even requires misdeeds". Reflecting on the game's unlikely journey in becoming a physical product, Paste declared Diamond Trust of London to be "not just a success in design, but also one of creation".
