= Jason Rohrer =

American video game designer

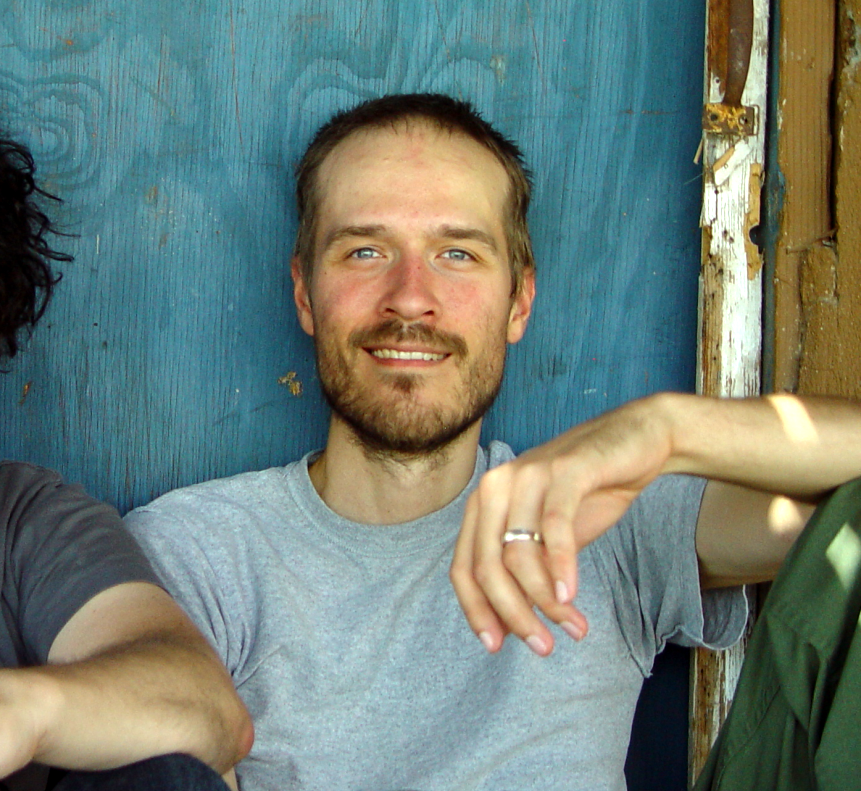
- Rohrer in 2012
- Born: November 14, 1977 (age 48)
- Education: Cornell University (BA)
- Occupations: Computer programmer, game designer, writer, musician

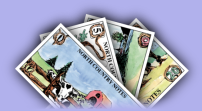
North Country Notes, a local currency proposed by Jason Rohrer (2005)

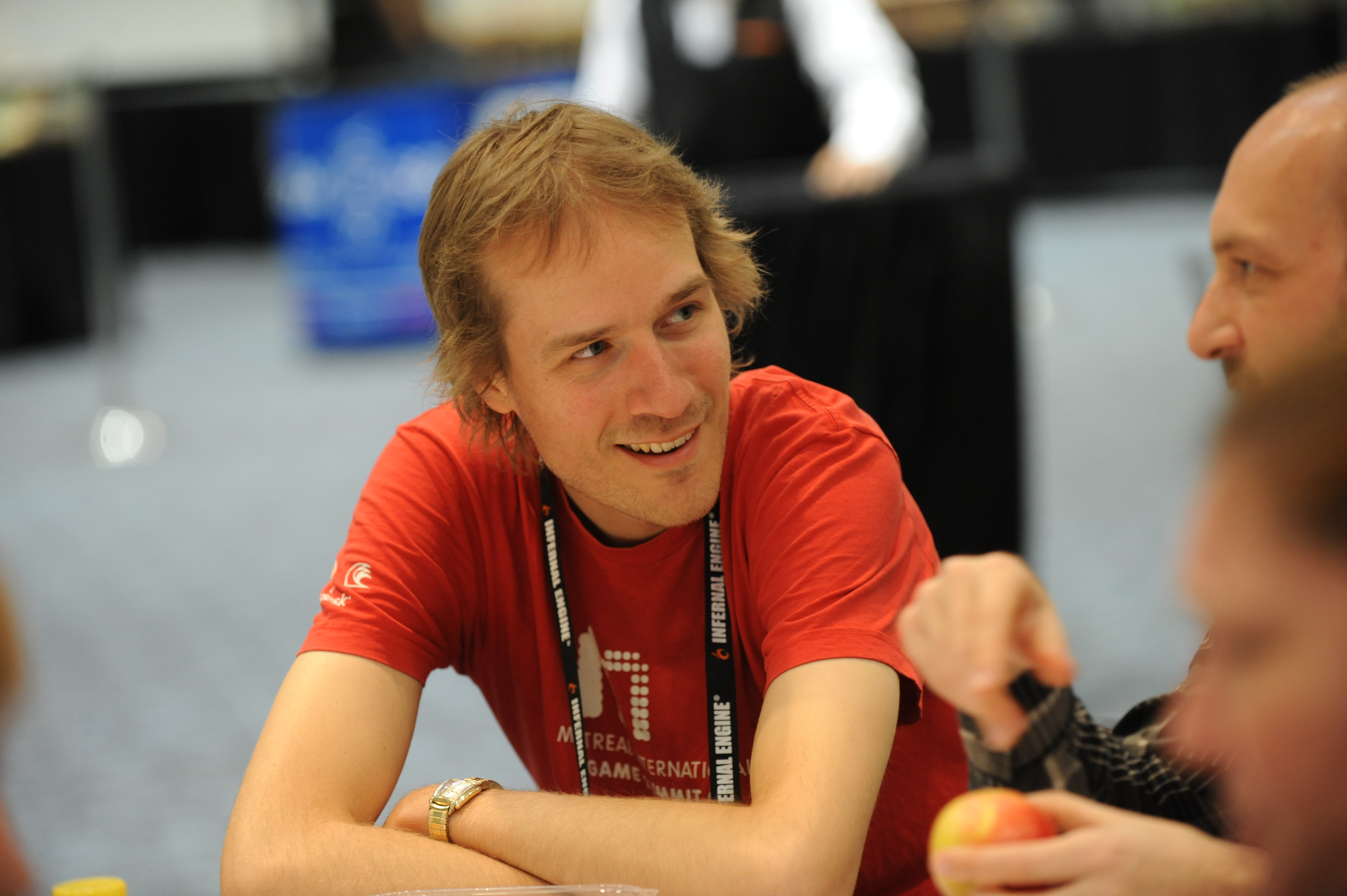
Jason Rohrer at the 2011 Game Developers Conference

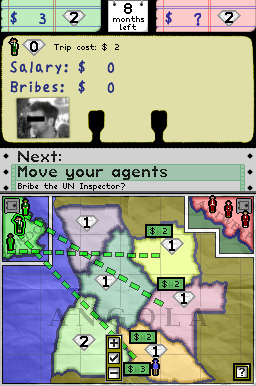
"Diamond Trust of London" a crowdfunded Nintendo DS game by Jason Rohrer (2012)

Jason Rohrer (born November 14, 1977) is an American computer programmer, writer, musician, and game designer. He publishes most of his software into the public domain (public-domain software) and charges for versions of his games distributed on commercial platforms like the iPhone appstore or Steam. He is a graduate of Cornell University. From 2004 until 2011 he practiced simple living, stating in 2009 that his family of four had an annual budget of less than $14,500. They have since relocated from Las Cruces, New Mexico to Davis, California. In 2005 Jason Rohrer worked on a local currency, called North Country Notes (NCN), for Potsdam, New York. In 2016 Rohrer became the first videogame artist to have a solo retrospective in an art museum. His exhibition, The Game Worlds of Jason Rohrer, was on view at The Davis Museum at Wellesley College until June 2016.

== Games ==
Rohrer has placed most of his creative work, like video games' source code and assets, into the public domain as he is a supporter of a copyright-less free distribution economy. Many of his project are hosted on SourceForge.

- Transcend – Rohrer's first game, released in 2005. Transcend is "an abstract 2D shooting game that doubles as a multimedia sculpture."
- Cultivation – Rohrer's second game, released in 2007, is "a social simulation about a community of gardeners."
- Passage – Rohrer's third game, which was released in 2007 and garnered much attention from the mainstream and independent gaming communities. The game lasts exactly five minutes, and focuses on life, mortality and the costs and benefits of marriage. It was featured in Kokoromi's curated GAMMA 256 event. In 2012 Passage became part of the permanent collection at the Museum of Modern Art.
- Gravitation – Rohrer's fourth game, released in 2008. That same year, it won the Jury award at IndieCade.
- Between – Rohrer's fifth game, released in 2008. It is hosted by Esquire Magazine as an adjunct to Rohrer's profile in the December 2008 issue and was the inaugural recipient of the 2009 Independent Games Festival's Innovation Award.
- Primrose – Rohrer's sixth game, designed for the iPhone (although released for home computers as well). It was released on February 19, 2009. It is a departure from the art-game theme, and is a simple puzzle game.
- Sleep is Death – Adventure-game-making software, released April 16, 2010. Sleep is Death games require the creator to be present to respond to the player's actions in near real-time. It has received favorable reviews from a number of mainstream game review sites.
- Game Design Sketchbook – In 2008 Rohrer created a number of games for The Escapist. These would usually be unpolished prototype games that explore a single theme, with an accompanying article by Rohrer describing the creative process of making games.
- Inside a Star-filled Sky – An "infinite, recursive tactical shooter" released in February 2011, favorably reviewed. Selected for presentation at the 2011 Tokyo Game Show's Sense of Wonder Night. The game was put by Rohrer into public domain, like many other games of Rohrer.
- Diamond Trust of London – A 2012 crowdfunded two-player strategy game for the Nintendo DS into public domain.
- The Castle Doctrine – An MMO burglary and home defense video game. Sold on Steam while being public-domain software.
- Cordial Minuet – A two-player online gambling strategy game played anonymously for real money.
- One Hour One Life – A multiplayer survival game of parenting and civilization building, released February 2018. Like the games before, public domain software and hosted on GitHub.

== GDC 2011 Game Design Challenge ==
At the 2011 Game Developers Conference Rohrer won the annual Game Design Challenge by proposing a game that could only be played once by a single player and then passed on to another. This idea was based on stories of his late grandfather that had been passed down. He stated "We become like gods to those who come after us." With this in mind he created a Minecraft mod, Chain World, that was put on a single USB flash drive, which he then passed to an audience member. The rules of the game were simple: No text signs are allowed in the game, players may play until they die once, upon respawning they must quit the game and the game must then be passed onto someone that is interested and willing to respect the rules.

== GDC 2013 Game Design Challenge ==
In March 2013 the Game Design Challenge was held at the Game Developers Conference for the final time. Its theme was "Humanity's Final Game." Rohrer was among the six contestants and won with his entry A Game For Someone, a physical game constructed of titanium. After its completion Rohrer buried it in an undisclosed location in the Nevada desert. At the challenge he released lists containing over one million discrete GPS coordinates, one of which was the actual burial spot. He estimated that with coordinated searching it would take at least 2,700 years to locate the game.

== The Game Worlds of Jason Rohrer ==
In February 2016, the Davis Museum at Wellesley College exhibited The Game Worlds of Jason Rohrer, the first museum retrospective dedicated to the work of a single video game maker. The museum stated "Rohrer's exhibited work is deft, engaging, and often surprisingly moving. It refers to a diverse set of cultural influences ranging from the fiction of Borges to Black Magic; at the same time, it also engages pressing emotional, intellectual, philosophical, and social issues. Rohrer's substantial recognition, which has included feature coverage in Wired, Esquire and The Wall Street Journal, as well as inclusion in MoMA's initial videogame acquisition, has been built on a singularly fascinating body of games. These range from the elegantly simple—such as Gravitation (2008), a game about flights of creative mania and melancholy—to others of Byzantine complexity. The exhibition featured four large build-outs that translate Rohrer’s games into unique spatial experiences, alongside a section dedicated to exploring a large body of his work." The exhibit was designed by IKD, a Boston-based design firm.

== Other projects ==
- konspire2b, a pseudonymous channel-based distributed file system
- token word, a Xanadu-style text editing system
- tangle, a proxy server which attempts to find relationships between websites and user visits
- MUTE, a anonymous P2P file sharing network with privacy in mind
- Monolith, a thought experiment that might be relevant to digital copyright
- seedBlogs, a modular building block that lets users add PHP and MySQL-backed dynamic content to any website
- silk, a web-based hypertext system to simplify web page linking, similar to wiki markup
- hyperlit, a literary hypertext authoring system
- subreal, a distributed evolution system
- Project December, an online conversation AI using GPT-2 and GPT-3 technology
- Project Skydrop, a scavenger hunt with prize

== Legal issues ==
In August 2005, Rohrer and his wife were arraigned for violating a local ordinance prohibiting grass taller than 10 inches. Representing himself, he successfully argued that natural landscaping had environmental benefits, and that the mowing ordinance was being enforced on them "in a manner that violates the free speech, equal protection, and due process clauses of the United States and New York constitutions." The court found that the statute was overly broad, and he was acquitted of all charges on June 12, 2006.
