= Kyodai Makes the Big Time =

1992 Dutch film

- Directed by: Ian Kerkhof
- Written by: Ian Kerkhof
- Cinematography: Joost van Gelder
- Edited by: Wendela Scheltema
- Release date: 8 October 1992
- Running time: 91 minutes
- Country: Netherlands
- Language: English

Kyodai Makes the Big Time is a 1992 Dutch drama film directed by South African film maker Ian Kerkhof (now known as Aryan Kaganof).

The film won the Golden Calf for Best Feature Film award at the 1992 Netherlands Film Festival. Janica Draisma also won the Golden Calf for Best Actress for her role in the film.

== Plot ==
The film follows the relationship between narcissistic actor Kyodai and dancer Stephanie.
