= Bigger than Jesus (album) =

Studio album by Kalahari Surfers
- Released: 11 November 1989
- Studio: Shifty Studios
- Genre: Experimental Rock
- Label: Recommended Records

Kalahari Surfers chronology
Sleep Armed	Bigger than Jesus	Akasic Record

Bigger than Jesus was, in 1989, the fourth full-length album by the Kalahari Surfers, the recording identity of South African musician Warrick Sony.

The South African censorship authorities banned Bigger than Jesus due to concerns about the title and song "Gutted With The Glory"'s use of the Lord's Prayer, which they deemed "abhorrent and hurtful". A shopper, Mevrou Mulder of Cape Town, was so offended by seeing the record on sale that she organised a petition to the Directorate of Publications. She complained: "The name alone is enough to make any Christian furious, not to mention the words. We as reborn Christians object to the publication of this record and also the distribution of it." Sony successfully appealed, and the record was unbanned on condition that the name was changed to Beachbomb. Personality magazine said the album "alternates between sheer poetic brilliance and intellectual nonsense."

== Track listing ==
1. "Plan for Peace" 03:45
2. "Good Advice" 02:35
3. "Running Out of Time" 03:37
4. "Limpet Mine" 02:54
5. "Interrupted Service" 00:17
6. "Tongaat" 03:06
7. "Let's Go Shopping" 02:35
8. "The Last Kick (One Verwoerd in the Grave)" 05:04
9. "Goldreef City" 02:19
10. "Reconnaissance" 03:56
11. "Bigger than Jesus" 04:18
12. "Gutted with the Glory" 02:19
13. "National Party" 01:49
14. "Meet the New Boss (He's the Same as the Old Boss)" 05:12
