= Lesego Rampolokeng =

South African writer, playwright and performance poet

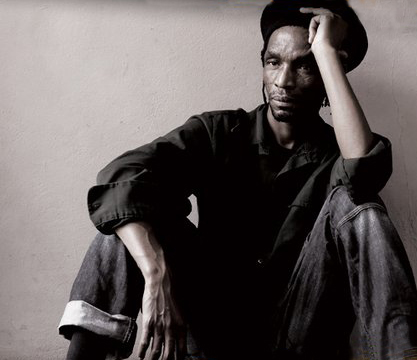
- Born: 7 July 1965 (age 61)
- Occupations: Poet, writer, musician and artist

Lesego Rampolokeng (born 7 July 1965) is a South African writer, playwright and performance poet.

== Early life and education ==
Lesego Rampolokeng was born in 1965 in Orlando West, Soweto, Johannesburg. He studied law at the University of the North in South Africa, but he has not followed this path any further.

== Works ==
Lesego Rampolokeng came to prominence in the 1980s, a very turbulent time in South Africa. He was born and bred in Soweto: "I was born in Orlando West. Bred thorough all across Soweto. Orlando East, White City, Chiawelo, Meadowlands, Diepkloof. I schooled in Jabavu, Moroka, Jabulani… " (Bird Monk Seding p20) His poetry stands aside from politics and is savagely critical of the (post)apartheid establishment. His first two books were published by the Congress of South African Writers (COSAW) Horns for Hondo (1991) and Talking Rain (1993). Rampolokeng has collaborated with various musicians on stage and in the studio. He has performed in many countries and with musicians such as Julian Bahula, Soulemane Toure, Louis Mhlanga, Tumi Mogorosi and Günter Sommer. He collaborated with the Kalahari Surfers on the Shifty Records album End Beginnings (vinyl, cassette and CD:1990) and the Bandcamp release: Bantu Rejex (2017) .

Live performances with Kalahari Surfers include: (i) The Festival PoesieBH’94 _Brazil (1994) poetry festival in Belo Horizonte, Brazil (ii)'Sinner and Saint' concerts with Louis Mhlanga (Music ye Afrika), Vusi Mahlasela and Duncan Senyatso (Kgwanyape Band) at Angoulême in France. (iii) Concert for James Phillips (September 1995/Shifty Records) (iv) Dada South! National Gallery, Cape Town (2009)

He is directly influenced by the writings of Frantz Fanon and he comes from the Black Consciousness era of the 1970s and 1980s. He is influenced by Ingoapele Madingoane, Matsemela Manaka and Maishe Maponya. Ingoapele Madingoane, in particular, had an immense influence on Rampolokeng becoming a writer. He is a PhD candidate at Rhodes University working on a thesis about Mafika Gwala. Controversially he is also a fan of the writings of Herman Charles Bosman and even moved to Groot Marico to imbibe the spirit of the man. (this explained in a live radio interview for 'Mushroom Hour')

In one of his poems, he claimed to "shoot the English with bullets that are British". In another piece of work, "Riding the Victim's Train" (on the CD/album The H.a.l.f Ranthology), Rampolokeng calls himself "a leper cast out in the desert, and cold, without a snout or paw in the pot of gold".

He has shared a stage with local and international poets including Kgafela oa Magogodi, Lefifi Tladi, Lebo Mashile and Natalia Molebatsi. Some academics and critics have compared Rampolokeng to the late Dambudzo Marechera because of his non-complacent and often confrontational writing. Rampolokeng appears in the documentary Giant Steps (2005), directed by Geoff Mphakati and Aryan Kaganof. He participated in the 2001 Poetry International Festival in Rotterdam.

=== Poetry ===
- Horns for Hondo (COSAW, 1990)
- Talking Rain (COSAW, 1993)
- Rap Master Supreme – Word Bomber in the Extreme (1997)
- End Beginnings (English-German) (Marino, 1998)
- Blue V's (English-German; with CD) (Edition Solitude, 1998)
- The Bavino Sermons (Gecko Poetry, 1999)
- The h.a.l.f. ranthology (CD with various musicians, 2002)
- The Second Chapter (Pantolea Press, 2003)
- Head on fire – Rants/Notes/Poems 2001-2011 (Deepsouth Publishing, 2012)
- History
- A Half Century Thing (Black Ghost Books, 2015)

=== Plays ===
- Fanon's Children
- Bantu Ghost- a stream of (black) unconsciousness

=== Albums (with the Kalahari Surfers) ===
- End Beginnings
- Bantu Rejex

=== Novels ===
- Blackheart (Pine Slopes Publications, 2004)
- Whiteheart (Deepsouth publishing, 2005)
- Bird-Monk Seding (Deepsouth Publishing, 2017)
