= Warrick Sony =

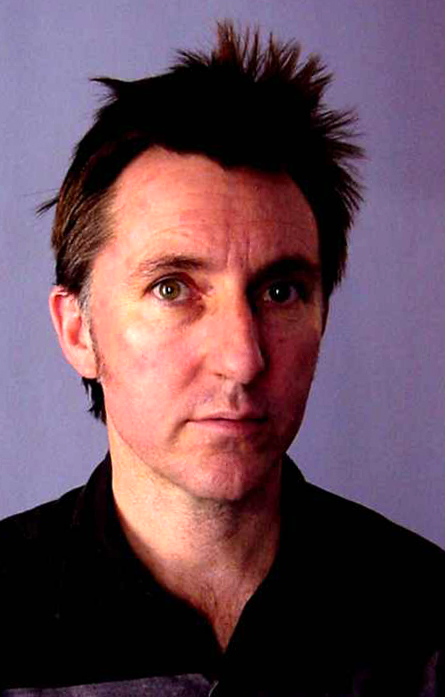

Background information
- Also known as: Kalahari Surfer, Wreck Sony
- Born: Warrick Swinney; 12 September 1958 (age 68); Port Elizabeth, Eastern Cape, South Africa
- Origin: South Africa
- Genres: Electronic, agitprop, world music
- Occupations: Musician, record producer, composer
- Instruments: Studio, guitar, drums, bass guitar, tabla, sitar, trombone
- Years active: 1982–present
- Labels: Shifty Records, African Dope, Recommended Records, Microdot
- Member of: Kalahari Surfers
- Website: http://www.kalaharisurfers.co.za

Warrick Swinney (born in 1958), more commonly known as Warrick Sony, is a South African composer, producer, musician and sound designer. He is the founder and sole permanent member of the Kalahari Surfers. They made politically radical satirical music in 1980s South Africa, and released it through the London-based Recommended Records. During this time the Surfers toured Europe with English session musicians.

Sony/Swinney produced albums, and ran the Shifty Music label at BMG (Africa) for two years in the mid-1990s with a passion for pan-African music he developed and imported records by many then unknown African artists. He was responsible for signing, for the Shifty/BMG Label Salif Keita's seminal Soro album as well as albums by S.E.Rogie (Palm Wine Guitar), Kasse Made (Foro)and Ray Lema (Medecine); all now rare vinyl for the collector.

Sony/Swinney has also worked as a film sound recordist, sound designer and sound artist and eventually after a hijacking incident moved to Cape Town with the Shifty Studio. Based in the city, and working at Milestone Studios from 2000 to 2018, he worked in the commercial sector on film, ads, radio, theatre and released more Kalahari Surfers albums. He moved into more specialised work in sound art, music and DJ events in the city and was accepted to do an MFA at Michaelis School of Art University of Cape Town where he graduated with distinction in 2020. During the following years he taught sound-art courses at Michaelis and worked towards a PhD with a 2020 Andrew W. Melon Foundation Fellowship. He completed this in 2024 at the University of the Western Cape.

== Early life ==
Sony was born in Port Elizabeth on 12 September 1958. He grew up in the Cowies Hill area of Durban, attending Westville High School where he played in school-based groups doing covers of songs by Jimi Hendrix and The Who. He was influenced by Indian music and cuisine and by the work of Frank Zappa and Captain Beefheart. He learned to play tabla at the Hindu Surat school in Durban. In 1976 he was conscripted into the South African Defence Force, where he declared himself a Hindu pacifist, and was assigned to medical duties and then to band work. During his military service, Sony played B♭ horn, euphonium and drums. He changed his surname from Swinney to Sony to make it harder for the army to get in touch with him for camps; he chose Sony because he liked their products. While Sony was in the army in 1977, his father brought him punk rock albums from an overseas trip. This was his first exposure to the Sex Pistols and the Clash.

== Kalahari Surfers ==
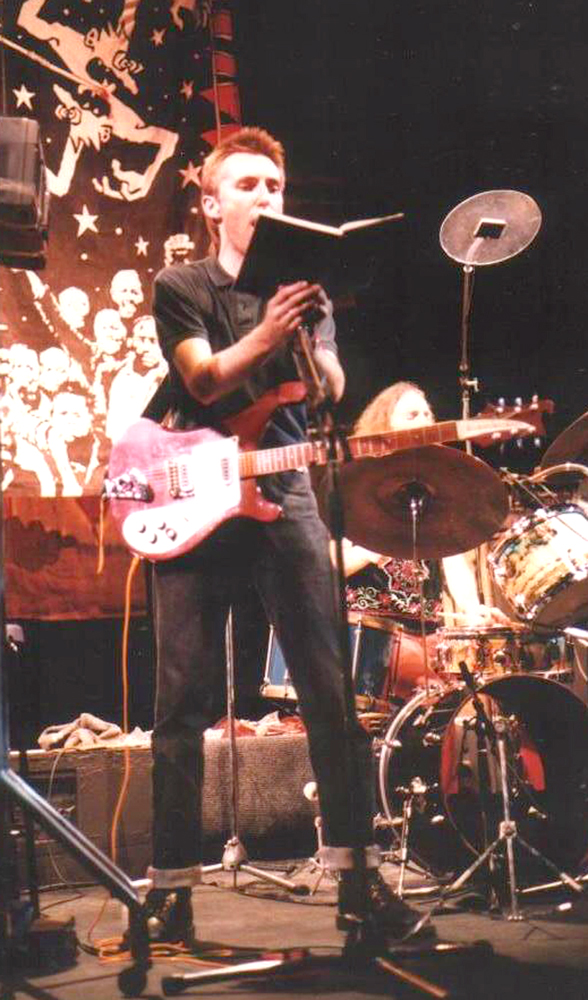
Sony performing with the Kalahari Surfers in Amsterdam, 1986. Chris Cutler is in the background.

The Kalahari Surfers are a "fictional group" which have served as a long-standing stage name for Warrick Sony's music. He is the only permanent member of the band, and brings in other musicians as and when needed. He adopted the name partly to protect himself from the authorities. The Surfers' music was the first radical white anti-apartheid pop in South Africa, and began with a 1982 home-recorded cassette titled "Gross National Products". Sony distributed it himself; the South African Sunday Times described it as a "daring home-mixed collection of subliminal jive rhythms, sad-sweet jazz sounds, tabla burps, church bells, bird shrieks, political speeches and... other... found sounds", and chose it as one of their three "Terrific Tapes of 1983". The second release was a double single package, "Burning Tractors Keep Us Warm", released by Pure Freude Records. German group Can were involved with this label.

Warrick Sony worked as a freelance sound engineer in the South African film industry, and used this to acquire many of the sound samples he later used in his music. Shifty Records tried to release the 1984 album Own Affairs, but could not find a vinyl plant which would press it. Chris Cutler's London-based Recommended Records pressed the album, the start of a long-standing alliance. Own Affairs was hailed as breathtaking, innovative and humorous by the Weekly Mail. The Sunday Times called it "a music born from the spilled seed of our national sickness and nurtured to nightmarehood in the moral drought of daily life/politics". Cutler helped set up tours, and in 1985 a second album, Living in the Heart of the Beast, was released. Jon Savage wrote in the New Statesman that it was a "success", praised its "viciously critical (and historically intelligent) lyrics", and compared it with early Zappa. The NME called it "brave". The third album, Sleep Armed (1987), has been called "the best snapshot we have of South Africa at the time, right down to the jacket photo of rich surfers on Umhlanga Roxx, a posh White beach in Durban".

In 1986, with a live band comprising Mick Hobbs on bass, Alig (from Family Fodder) on keyboards, Tim Hodgkinson (keyboards, sax and slide guitar), and Chris Cutler on drums, Sony performed in the Netherlands, Germany, Switzerland, France, Luxembourg, the Festival des Politischen Liedes in East Berlin, and London. In 1989 they were the first South African band invited to play in the Soviet Union, where they played Moscow, Leningrad, and Riga.

In 1989 the South African authorities banned the fourth album Bigger Than Jesus, due to concerns about the song "Gutted with the Glory"' and the use of the Lord's Prayer. This album was deemed "abhorrent and hurtful". A shopper, Mevrou Mulder of Cape Town, was so offended by seeing the record on sale that she organised a petition to the Directorate of Publications. She complained: "The name alone is enough to make any Christian furious, not to mention the words. We as reborn Christians object to the publication of this record and also the distribution of it." Sony successfully appealed, and the record was unbanned on condition that the name was changed to Beachbomb. Personality magazine said the album "alternates between sheer poetic brilliance and intellectual nonsense." The first three albums remained banned in South Africa.

Sony worked as a sound recordist (for many foreign networks including ABC, CBS, BBC ) covering the defiance campaign and consequently the release from prison of Nelson Mandela in February 1990. He has used some of the recordings he made as a journalist in his musical work. He worked with Donald Woods on a documentary at this time. Sony worked with Lloyd Ross at Shifty Records from 1992, mostly concentrating on developing and promoting foreign African music in South Africa. He bought the studios first 16-track recording machine and became a partner in the company when Ivan Kadey emigrated.

"Don't Dance", from Own Affairs, 1984
A sample from near the start of the Kalahari Surfers' much-anthologised "Don't Dance", 1984

"9866" from Akasic Record, 2001

In 1997 Sony left Johannesburg, where he had lived since 1983, after being shot in a hijacking. In 1998 he said he had been against the cultural boycott of South Africa in the apartheid era, as it had prevented important ideas from coming to the country.

Since the turn of the millennium Sony has released more Kalahari Surfers albums. Akasic Record (2001) is "a highly sophisticated foray into African-flavoured dubfunk"; Muti Media (2003) features a sculpture by Brett Murray on the cover, and Zukile Malahlana from Marekta appears on the album. Conspiracy of Silence (2005) and Panga Management (2007) followed. One Party State (2010) was released on Microdot and debuted at the African Soul Rebels Tour in the UK alongside Oumou Sangaré & Orchestre Poly-Rythmo De Cotonou. It features Sowetan poet Lesego Rampolokeng on four tracks. The Mail & Guardian called it "a politically drenched album... track for track the most solid South African release of 2010". The Kalahari Surfers performed at the Cape Town Electronic Music Festival in early 2012, and released a live album of the performance. Agitprop was released later in 2012, on Sjambok Music; it was first played at the Unyazi Festival in Durban in September. Agitprop explores Sony's fears about South Africa in the 2010s becoming a one party state under the African National Congress, and includes a song about chemical warfare scientist Wouter Basson. South African Rolling Stone compared it to the KLF, Sly and Robbie and Pink Floyd, and described its "slow evolution of nuance" towards the "desolately upbeat" "Hostile Takeover". Sony says the album was mostly written on the train while commuting to work; he calls the genre "Voktronic, ... a blend of folktronic, and volkspiele with a dose of electronic experimental dubstep and experimental rolled up into one fat two blade stereo hit." Warrick toured a Kalahari Surfers line-up playing eleven cities in the UK in 2010 with the African Soul Rebels tour alongside Oumou Sangaré and Orchestre Poly Rythmo de Cotonou.

== Trans-Sky, remix and production work ==
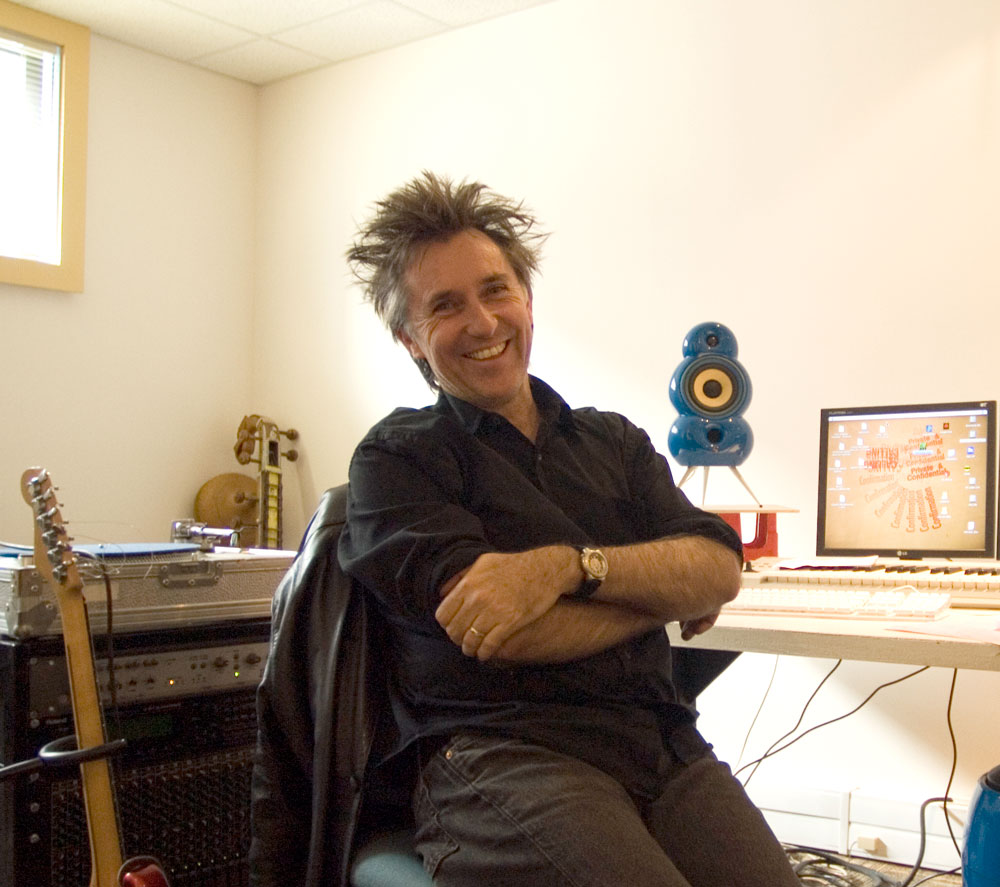
At Milestone Studios

Under the name Trans-Sky, Sony produced Killing Time (CD) and Heaven To Touch (EP) with Brendan Jury, and toured South Africa opening for Massive Attack in 1998. He made the album End Beginnings with Lesego Rampolokeng in 1993, which led to a series of concerts in Brazil. In 1998 he worked on Turntabla, an electro-dub project with ex-Orb members Greg Hunter and Kris Weston, and did the sound engineering for a workshop with Brian Eno in Cape Town.

Sony's remix projects include work for M.E.L.T. 2000 on the Busi Mhlongo remix album. He was invited to present a performance for Unyazi: International Electronic Music Symposium at Wits University, Johannesburg in 2005, and co-produced and arranged the album The Triptic (2007) for Polish metal band Sweet Noise.

He designed Kalahari Surfers drum modules for PureMagnetik for Ableton Live music software. He uses a Roland GR09 guitar to trigger his synthesiser, keyboards and samples, and uses Ableton Live and Launchpad with Korg controllers to make his music.

== Film, art, theatre and academia ==
As a sound designer Sony worked on the feature film The Mangler, directed by Tobe Hooper. He co-composed (with Murray Anderson) the score for Canadian Broadcasting documentary Madiba: The Life and Times of Nelson Mandela (1996), for which he was awarded the Gemini Award for best music. He composed music for Gerrie & Louise (1997), sound design for Izulu lami (2008) and sound for Zimbabwe (directed by Darryl Roodt, 2008) In 2010 he wrote music for Jozi, a comedy directed by Craig Fremont produced by Thom Pictures and Anant Singh.

He worked with Rodney Place on the Couch Dancing exhibition. He did music for Ochre and Water: Himba chronicles from the land of Kaoko for Doxa Productions. He worked with Murray Anderson to make music for the Museum of Rock Art and in March 2007, with Pops Mohamed and Dizu Plaatjie's band Ubuyambo performed at Turbulence, the South African art exhibition in Red Bull's Hangar 7 event in Salzburg.

He has been involved in multimedia theatre productions such as William Kentridge's Ubu and the Truth Commission (with Brendan Jury) and Faustus in Africa, and Handspring Puppet's Tall Horse.

Television credits include Apartheid's Last Stand (1999) and Parklife: Africa (2001).

He worked on commercials, film scores and music for theatre. He was based at Milestone Studios, Cape Town, and his advertising work included commissions from Nissan, Daewoo, Land Rover, and BMW.

Sony exhibited two video works at the 56th Venice Biennale at the South African Pavilion. He left Milestone to concentrate on his master's degree which he completed with distinction, at Michaelis School of Fine Art at the University of Cape Town in 2019. His final examination work was shown at a solo show at the Michaelis Gallery in November 2018.

In 2020 he received a Mellon Foundation Turning the Tide scholarship and enrolled to do his PhD through UWC (the University of the Western Cape).

In September 2022 he attended the Bauhaus University/Goethe Institute offered 3-month Radio Art Residency residency in Weimar, Germany, producing a body of work which was exhibited at the Eigenheim Gallery under the title, Mutant Farmyard Activities (3-15 December). He also completed a 55-minute radio art piece titled "Vuvuzela's and Sun Damage" for Deutschlandfunk Kultur, another of the Radio Art Residency sponsors.

In August 2024 he was awarded a Phd at the University of the Western Cape. It is titled "Signal To Noise - sonic reflections on the South African transition period (1984-1998)".

In 2025 Swinney was accepted for the ArtSci4Innovation Postdoctoral Fellow, at Wits University - Wits Innovation Centre Artist-in-residence Fellow doing sound lectures at the School of Architecture and Planning (SOAP) in the Faculty of Engineering and the Built Environment at Wits University.

== Discography ==
=== Kalahari Surfers ===
- Gross National Products cassette (1982)
- Burning Tractors Keep Us Warm double-single (1983, Pure Freude-Germany)
- Own Affairs (1984, Recommended)
- Living in the Heart of the Beast (1985, Recommended)
- Sleep Armed (1987, Recommended)
- Bigger Than Jesus (Beachbomb in SA) (1989, Recommended/Shifty)
- End Beginnings (with Lesego Rampolokeng) (1989, Recommended/Shifty)
- Paralyzer Ghetto Muffin (1999, Milestone)
- Akasic Record (2001, African Dope)
- Muti Media (2003, African Dope)
- Tall Horse (2005, Milestone)
- Conspiracy of Silence (2005, Microdot)
- Panga Management (2007, Microdot)
- One Party State (2010, Microdot)
- Agitprop (2012, Sjambokmusic.com)
- Tropical Barbie Hawaiian Surf Set – Retro Active Material From 1982-1989 (Compilation) (2014, Roastin' Records)
- Unoriginal Inhabitants (2015, Sjambokmusic.com)
- Live at the Cape Town Electronic Music Festival (2012, Sjambokmusic.com)
- Spinning Jenny (May 2015, Sjambokmusic.com)
- Bantu Rejex (May 2017, Sjambokmusic.com)
- Chernobyl (June 2019, Sjambokmusic.com)
- Babylon Mission Report (with Lesego Rampolokeng) (July 2021, Sjambokmusic.com)
- Babylon Mission Report in DUB (September 2021, Sjambokmusic.com)

=== Compilations ===
- Munen Muso 1 (Network 77)
- The Sound of Dub (Echo Beach)
- Breathe Sunshine (Amabala)
- The Mothers Township Sessions (Mr Bongo Recordings)
- Yehlisan'umoya Ma-Afrika—Urban Zulu Remixes (2000, M.E.L.T.)
- African Meltdown Volume One – with Greg Hunter
- The Rough Guide to the Music of South Africa – Rough Guides
- Mandela: Son of Africa, Father of a Nation (Island Records OST1997)
- U KNOW ? Mixes Vol. 1 (2000, M.E.L.T.)
- U KNOW ? Mixes Vol. 3 (2000, M.E.L.T.)
- U KNOW ? Mixes Vol. 4 (2000, M.E.L.T.)
- A Naartjie in our Sosaatie (Shifty)
- New Africa Rock (Shifty)
- Forces Favourites (Shifty)
- Rē Records Quarterly Vol.1 No.1 (1985, Recommended)
- RēR Quarterly Vol.4 No.1 (1994, Recommended)

== Publications ==
1.) House on Fire: Sankomota and the art of abstraction”. a video lecture for Africa Synthesised . 26 /06 /2020 in Herri: Vol 4

2.)Stick-fighting against extinction: end beginnings and other dada nihilismus polemics. (18/12/2020) for Phellelo Mofekeng’s BKO Magazine: download PDF

3.) “ Palisade of Culture” New Contrast (191 vol 48 Spring) 2020 essay about playing concerts in the USSR in the late 1990’s dealing with socio political issues, crumbling east bloc and differences and similarities with totalitarian apartheid political structures and music censorship.

4.) “Shutdown-Shutdown” Hotazel Review. Issue 1-2022.

5.)“ The hauntologies of Sankomota: houses on fire, murmurs, witches and riddles.” Special Issue of Kronos: out September 2023

6.) “Between Substance and Shadow: investigations into the cynanthropy of Gary the Dog” for This Mortal Body - As part of “Rethinking South African Literature(s)" out in late 2023

7.) "Practices of Listening: Repercussions of Sound, Silences and Censorship from (Post)Apartheid South_Africa" (MFA Thesis, original title: Hit The Mute Button)

8.) Artthrob. Issue No. 84, August 2004. Sonic Mysticism: The Limitations of Technique.

9.) A Talk with Warrick Sony on Bauhaus FM.

10.)Zandi Tisani’s Rave & Resistance - The birth of club culture in 90s Johannesburg.
