= Chain World =

- Developer: Jason Rohrer
- Platform: Windows PC
- Release: 2011
- Mode: Single-player

Chain World is a video game designed by Jason Rohrer, and built on the game Minecraft. Chain World won the 2011 Game Design Challenge. The challenge was named GDC: The Game Design Challenge: Bigger Than Jesus with the goal to create a game that could become a religion.

Only one known copy of the game exists on a customized USB flash drive. The game was designed to be played by only one player at a time who would alter the game world. Future players were to be chosen by the current USB drive holder. After his GDC presentation, Rohrer passed the game on, apparently at random, to audience member Jia Ji. Jia Ji created controversy by selling the game on eBay for charity, and imposing his own set of rules about who could play Chain World after the auction winner.

The current location of the flash drive is unknown, though in June 2012, Positional Super Ko, believed to be the winner of Jia Ji's auction, tweeted that they still had the drive, however in February 2016, Positional Super Ko tweeted again, stating that they had given the drive to somebody, though it is unknown who. Some time later, game designer Naomi Clark got hold of the USB drive and still had it by October 2017, according to Rohrer himself, although what happened afterward is as-of-yet unknown.

The game was originally created using Minecraft Beta 1.8 version, using Chain World as the seed. The USB stick itself was given a custom treatment by Rohrer to create the appearance of an ancient artifact. Due to it only being available on said USB stick and one of the game's rules forbidding conversation about the game's contents, little is known about it.

== Gameplay ==
Chain World is a Minecraft save game from its Beta 1.8 version. Each player is allowed to play once before their character is wiped using a script and the player is forced to hand the USB to someone else, referred to as "continuing the chain". The player is also required to follow nine rules, called Commandments by Rohrer, listed below:

1. Run Chain World using one of the launcher files included on the USB stick.
2. Use the already made singleplayer save named Chain World.
3. Play until you die one time.
  1. Making wooden signs with text is forbidden.
  2. Player suicide is permitted.
4. Immediately after dying, quit to the menu.
5. Allow the world to save upon leaving.
6. Exit the game and wait for the save to be copied to the USB stick.
7. Give the USB stick to whomever expresses interest.
8. Never discuss what you saw on the save.
9. Never play Chain World again.
