= Game Developers Conference =

Annual video game developer conference

- Genre: Video game development
- Venue: Moscone Convention Center
- Locations: San Francisco, California
- Country: United States
- Inaugurated: April 1988; 38 years ago (as Computer Game Developers Conference)
- Most recent: March 9, 2026; 8 months ago
- Next event: March 1, 2027; 3 months' time
- Attendance: 30,000 (2025)
- Organizer: Informa Festivals
- Website: gdconf.com

The Game Developers Conference (GDC) is an annual conference for video game developers. The event includes an expo, networking events, and awards shows like the Game Developers Choice Awards and Independent Games Festival, and a variety of tutorials, lectures, and roundtables by industry professionals on game-related topics covering programming, design, audio, production, business and management, and visual arts.

In October 2025, it was announced that the event would be rebranded to GDC Festival of Gaming beginning the following year.

== History ==
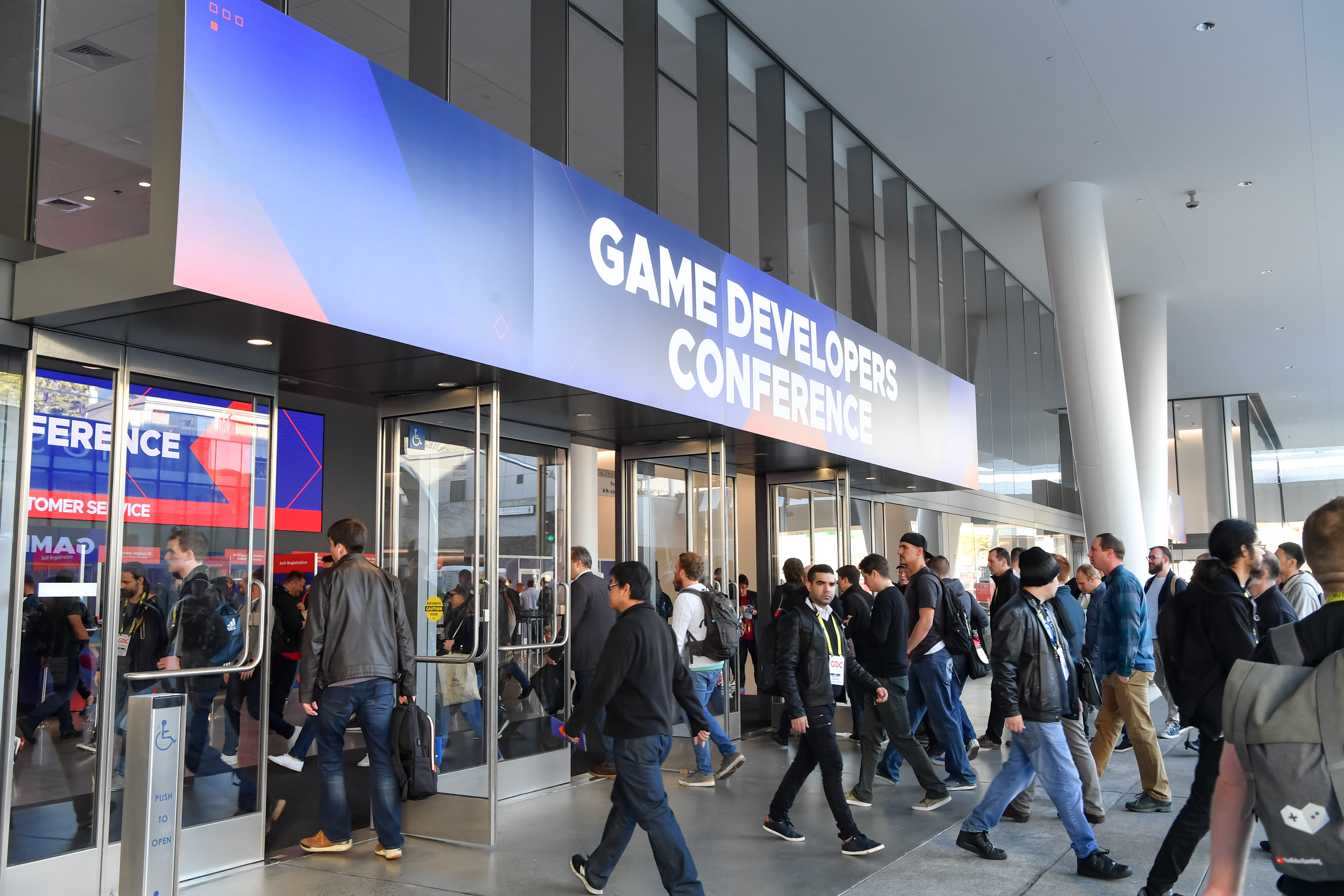
Outside the Moscone Center, San Francisco, 2019

Originally called the Computer Game Developers Conference, the first conference was organized in April 1988 by Chris Crawford in his San Jose, California, living room. About twenty-seven designers attended, including Don Daglow, Brenda Laurel, Brian Moriarty, Gordon Walton, Tim Brengle, Cliff Johnson, Dave Menconi, and Carol and Ivan Manley. The second conference, held that same year at a Holiday Inn at Milpitas, attracted about 125 developers. Early conference directors included Brenda Laurel, Tim Brengle, Sara Reeder, Dave Menconi, Jeff Johannigman, Stephen Friedman, Chris Crawford, and Stephanie Barrett. Later directors included John Powers, Nicky Robinson, Anne Westfall, Susan Lee-Merrow, and Ernest W. Adams. In the early years the conference changed venue each year to accommodate its increases in size. Attendance in this period grew from 525 to 2,387. By 1994, the CGDC could afford to sponsor the creation of the Computer Game Developers Association with Adams as its founding director. Miller Freeman, Inc. (a division of United Newspapers, later UBM) took on the running of the conference in 1996, nearly doubling attendance to 4,000 that year. In 2005, the GDC moved to the new Moscone Center West in the heart of San Francisco's SOMA district, and reported over 12,000 attendees. The GDC returned to San Jose in 2006 and moved again to San Francisco in 2007 – where the organizers expect it will stay for the foreseeable future. Attendance figures continued to rise in following years, with 18,000 attendees in the 2008 event. The 2009 Game Developers Conference was held in San Francisco, on March 23–27, 2009. The IGDA awarded 25 scholarships to send qualified students to attend the 2009 GDC.

Crawford continued to give the conference keynote address for the first several years of the conference, including one in the early 1990s where he punctuated a point about game tuning and player involvement by cracking a bullwhip perilously close to the front row of the audience. Crawford also founded The Journal of Computer Game Design in 1987 in parallel to beginning the GDC, and served as publisher and editor of the academic-style journal through 1996.

During the late 1990s, the conference expanded from its original strict focus on game design to include topics such as marketing and legal issues.

The CGDC changed its name to "Game Developers Conference" in 1999. The GDC has also hosted the Spotlight Awards from 1997 to 1999, the Independent Games Festival since 1999 and the Game Developers Choice Awards since 2001. The GDC is also used for the annual meeting of the International Game Developers Association (IGDA).

The Independent Games Festival (IGF) is the first and largest competition for independent games, and highlights the innovative achievements of developers ranging in size from individuals building PC titles to studio teams creating console downloadable titles. A pool of judges from the game industry selects the finalists and winners, and the individual creators are named as the recipients of the awards. The IGF is managed and developed by UBM TechWeb, the organizer of the GDC.

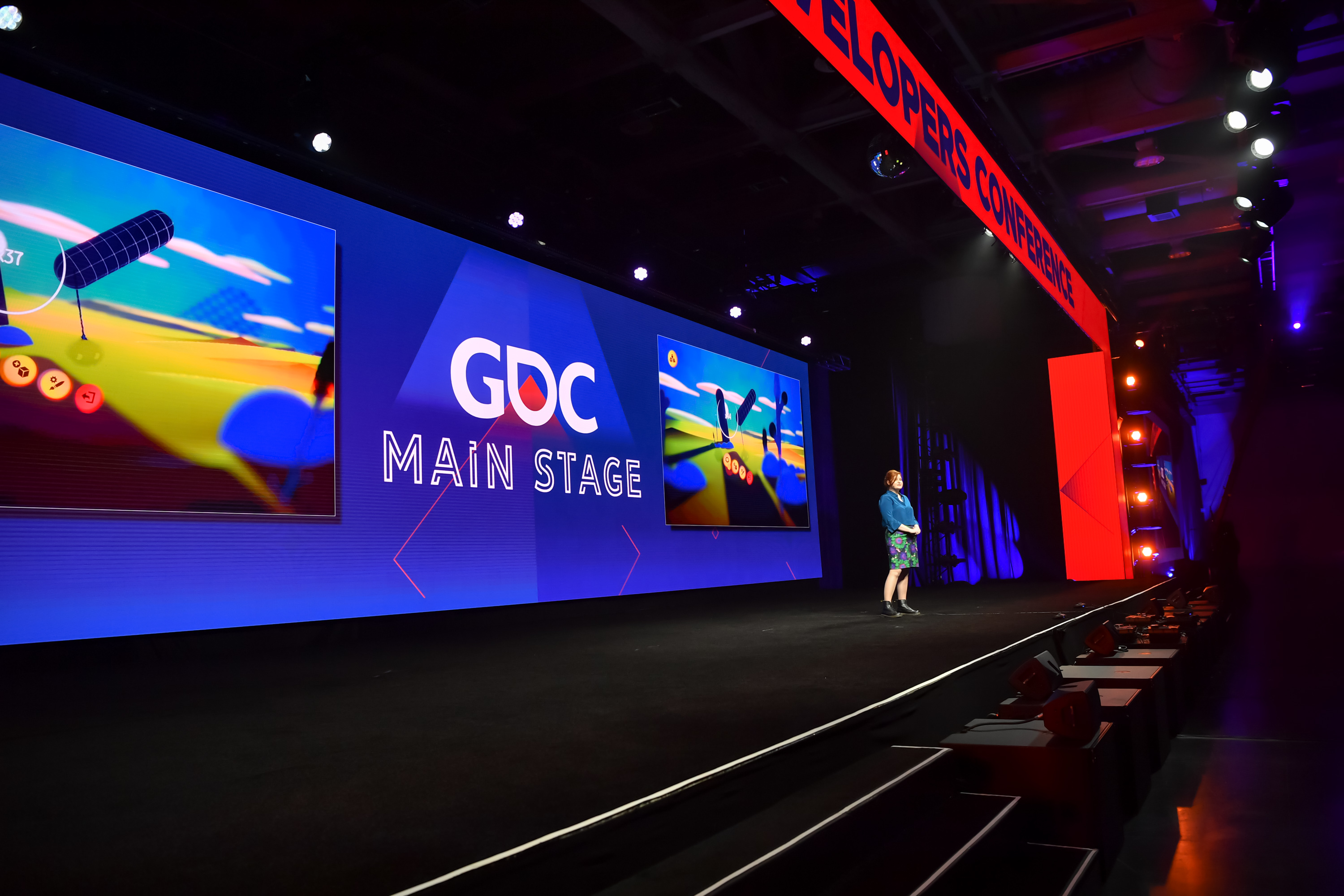
GDC Main Stage, 2019

The Game Developers Choice Awards is the game industry's only open, peer-based awards show. Any member of the IGDA may nominate games, and then the membership votes on the finalists. As with the IGF, the individual creators are named as the recipients of the awards. Specialty awards such as Lifetime Achievement and First Penguin are determined by the GDCA committee, and all are revealed at the Game Developers Choice Awards ceremony at the GDC. The IGF and the GDCA are presented back to back, in an awards show produced by UBM TechWeb, typically on the Wednesday of the GDC.

UBM TechWeb has added several other events to the GDC in recent years. At the GDC Expo, developers display the latest techniques useful in game development. "GDC Mobile", first held in 2002, focuses on developing games for mobile phones. Starting in 2004, the GDC partnered with Game Connection to present Game Connection @ GDC, a live matchmaking service for developers and publishers, which in 2007 expanded to include Game Connection Services for outsourcing and other services. Starting in 2006, the GDC partnered with Video Games Live to feature their symphonic performance of videogame music as the closing night event. In addition, the GDC has hosted a number of conference-wide game experiments designed by GameLab. The 2017 GDC included a Board Game Design Day, featuring talks from developers and publishers of tabletop games on their design processes.

UBM TechWeb has also produced several spinoff events. For example, the first GDC Europe (GDCE) was featured at the European Computer Trade Show (ECTS) in London between August 31 and September 1, 2001. Other GDC-related events include the Serious Games Summit, first held in 2004 as a GDC tutorial, and spun off as a standalone event in 2005, focusing on developing games for practical purposes, such as education, corporate training, military, and health care applications; and the Hollywood and Games Summit in conjunction with The Hollywood Reporter first held in June 2006. Additional events include the Game Advertising Summit, the Game Outsourcing Summit, the Game Career Seminar, GDC Russia, the China Game Summit, GDC London, the London Games Summit, the London Game Career Fair, and many others. In late 2006, UBM TechWeb acquired The Game Initiative, and produced the Austin Game Developers Conference. In 2012, GDC Online in Austin, traditionally about massively multiplayer online games, was abandoned in favor of GDC Next in Los Angeles to focus more on app development.

The 2020 GDC notably was the first to be fully postponed from its planned March 2020 dates, as a result of several companies having pulled out due to fears from the COVID-19 pandemic. Organizers ran the 2020 GDC as a virtual conference and announced GDC Summer as the next live event to take place in August. While initially planning on a mixed in-person and virtual conference for the 2021 event, the organizers dropped the in-person portion in February 2021 due to continued concerns from COVID-19, maintaining the virtual events.

With the 2026 event, the GDC organizers will rebrand the event as the GDC Festival of Games, citing changes in the video game industry landscape, with the community "need[ing] more connection, visibility, and support". Among other changes of expanding the session is the plan to allow attendees access to all parts of the event. The 2026 event took place short after the start of the 2026 Iran war, along with ongoing conflicts in Ukraine, which impacted attendance; further, many non-American developers opted to not attend due to the aggressive immigration policies of the second Trump administration. Attendance dropped to 20,000, around 10,000 less compared to previous years from these issues.

=== GDC China ===
UBM TechWeb brought its flagship event to Shanghai in 2007, where GDC China was held annually until 2015.

GDC China hosted the annual Independent Games Festival China (IGF China) from 2009, calling for entries developed by independent game studios and individuals in the Asia-Pacific region. IGF China includes the Independent Games Summit, the Independent Games Festival Pavilion, and the Independent Games Festival Awards Ceremony.

== Recurring highlights ==
=== Tutorials ===
About half of the time during the first two days of GDC are given over to tutorials, one- or two-day-long sessions on a given topic. Tutorials take the form of hands-on workshops and cover a variety of technical subjects such as game design, audio, topics in computer programming (such as physics, graphics programming or web technologies), production and business management.

=== Summits ===
A summit is a section of panels dedicated to a sub-segment of the game industry, also usually held on the first two days of the conference. Past and current summit topics include mobile games, independent games, game education (for students aspiring to join the industry), serious games, social games, artificial intelligence, and online games.

=== Console Maker's Keynotes ===
Regularly, Sony Computer Entertainment, Microsoft and Nintendo deliver keynotes at the conference showcasing upcoming products and technologies. Next to the Electronic Entertainment Expo, GDC keynotes are one of the more significant sources of news about upcoming console hardware and platforms, but with a focus on the developer audience instead of the wider press. A number of games in development or upcoming releases are also showcased, but generally far fewer than at traditional gaming conventions.

=== Developer's Rant ===
Since 2005, the "rant" panel has been one of the most popular sessions at the conference. Moderated by Eric Zimmerman and Jason Della Rocca, a selection of notable industry figures are invited to speak on industry-related subjects they are passionate about. According to Zimmerman, the idea of the panel "is to really take those grumblings and mutterings and bring them out into the light, speak truth to power, cut through to the real s***, and talk about what is going on in our industry—what's wrong and what we can do to change it." Many rants inspire controversy, discussion and a good deal of media coverage in industry press. Most rant sessions focus on a particular segment of the industry to draw their speakers from:

- 2005: "Burning Down the House: Game Developers Rant"
- 2006: "Burn Baby, Burn: Game Developers Rant"
- 2007: "Burning Mad: Game Publishers Rant"
- 2008: "Pouring Gas on the Flames: Game Designers Rant"
- 2009: "Burned by Friendly Fire: Game Critics Rant"
- 2010: "Fired and Fired-Up: Jobless Developers Rant"
- 2011: "No Freaking Respect! Social Game Developers Rant Back"
- 2012: "Burn this MotherFather!: Game Dev Parents Rant"
- 2013: "Mad as Hell: Hothead Developers Rant Back"
- 2014: "Rant Apocalypse: The 10th Anniversary Mega Session"

The Rant panel has inspired similarly structured sessions, with more specialized topics (e.g., "Game Educators Rant" during the Education Summit, or rants during the Indie Game Summit).

=== Game Design Challenge ===
Eric Zimmerman created the Game Design Challenge. "The idea of the challenge, he said, was to give everyone a sense of the process behind game design, and to attempt to get everyone thinking about new kinds of games." No actual game needs to be built, just designed. The goal of the 2nd annual Game Design Challenge was to create a game based on Emily Dickinson. It was won by Will Wright who designed an Emily Dickinson personality simulator contained entirely on a USB flash drive. The personality would interact with the player by sending Instant Messages and email. The goal was to maintain a stable relationship and avoid the two extremes: romantic obsession with the player or suicidal depression. The first occurrence meant constant interruptions when using the computer. The latter occurrence allowed for the simulation to delete itself. The 3rd time, the task was to create a game worthy of a Nobel Prize. Harvey Smith won with his PeaceBomb game. It would utilize wireless devices to organize flash mobs to engage in random acts of charity. For the first 3 challenges, Eric Zimmerman has always ended the challenge by indicating that all the contestants' ideas could really be made into a game.

The goal of the 4th annual Game Design Challenge was to create a game which was a religion, or which could become one. It was won by Jason Rohrer who designed a one-player at a time multiplayer game named Chain World contained entirely on a USB flash drive.

=== Experimental Gameplay Workshop ===
The Experimental Gameplay Workshop is an influential 2-hour game presentation session held annually at the Game Developers Conference in San Francisco. The event showcases experimental video games and game prototypes. The workshop was founded by Jonathan Blow, the developer behind the game Braid. As of 2021, it was headed by Robin Hunicke and Daniel Benmergui. The session generally showcases 20 titles from over 250 submissions each year. Keita Takahashi showcased his title Katamari Damacy before it was released in the US at the workshop in 2004. At lecture at the GDC in 2005, Keita credited the session for helping get the game released in the US. In a 2009 interview, he however expressed some criticism of the format, saying the games chosen felt gimick-y and the presentations being uninteresting.

=== Game Developers Choice Awards ===
Held at the main GDC event in the first part of the year, the presentation for the Game Developers Choice Awards (GDCA) is held. The GDCAs are available for any game made in the previous calendar year, nominated and voted on by members of the game development community.

=== Independent Games Festival ===
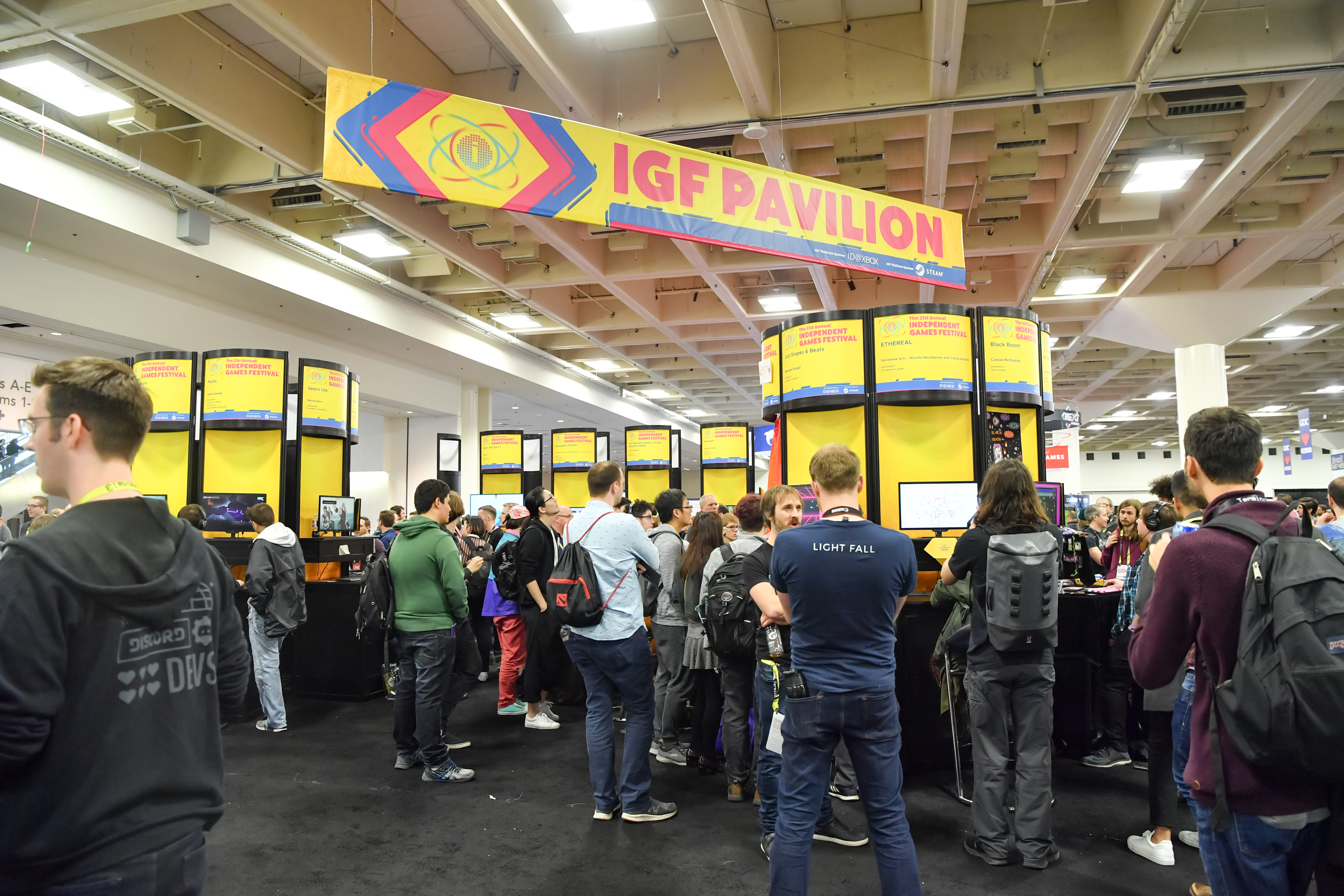
The Independent Games Festival Pavilion at the 2019 GDC

The Independent Games Festival (IGF) is an event held during the main GDC in the early part of the year, open to games from small independent studios and from students at universities. The IGF culminates with the presentation of several awards to games which have been nominated and voted on in the months prior, and which are given space at the IGF to showcase their game. These awards have cash prizes associated with them, ranging from US$1,000 to US$30,000 for the Seumas McNally Grand Prize. The ceremony is typically held as the lead-in to the GDCA award ceremony.

=== alt.ctrl.GDC ===
alt.ctrl.GDC is an exhibit taking place in the GDC Expo. Visitors can play games using alternative controllers and meet the developers behind the projects. One of these games win the alt.ctrl.GDC Award, which includes a $2,000 prize plus a special trophy, at the IGF ceremony during GDC, with judging taking place on-site.

== Events ==
| Conference | Location | Dates | Attendees |
|---|---|---|---|
2001
| GDC 2001 | San Jose Convention Center; San Jose, California | March 20–24 | |
2002
| GDC 2002 | San Jose Convention Center; San Jose, California | March 19–23 | ~10,000 |
2003
| GDC 2003 | San Jose Convention Center; San Jose, California | March 4–8 | |
2004
| GDC 2004 | San Jose Convention Center; San Jose, California | March 22–26 | |
2005
| GDC 2005 | Moscone Center West, San Francisco, California | March 7–11 | ~12,000 |
2006
| GDC 2006 | San Jose Convention Center; San Jose, California | March 22–24 | ~12,500 |
2007
| GDC 2007 | Moscone Center; San Francisco, California | March 4–9 | >16,000 |
2008
| GDC 2008 | Moscone Center; San Francisco, California | February 18–22 | 18,000 |
2009
| GDC 2009 | San Francisco, California | March 23–27 | |
| GDC Europe 2009 | Cologne, Germany | August 17–19 | |
| GDC Austin 2009 | Austin, Texas | September 15–28 | |
| GDC China 2009 | Shanghai, China | October 11–13 | |
2010
| GDC 2010 | San Francisco, California | March 9–13 | |
| GDC Canada 2010 | Vancouver, Canada | May 6–7 | |
| GDC Europe 2010 | Cologne, Germany | August 16–18 | |
| GDC Online 2010 | Austin, Texas | October 5–8 | |
| GDC China 2010 | Shanghai, China | December 5–7 | |
2011
| GDC 2011 | San Francisco, California | February 28 – March 4 | |
| GDC Europe 2011 | Cologne, Germany | August 15–17 | |
| GDC Online 2011 | Austin, Texas | October 10–13 | |
| GDC China 2011 | Shanghai, China | November 12–14 | |
2012
| GDC 2012 | San Francisco, California | March 5–9 | |
| GDC Europe 2012 | Cologne, Germany | August 13–15 | |
| GDC Online 2012 | Austin, Texas | October 9–11 | |
| GDC China 2012 | Shanghai, China | November 17–19 | |
2013
| GDC 2013 | San Francisco, California | March 25–29 | |
| GDC Europe 2013 | Cologne, Germany | August 19–21 | |
| GDC China 2013 | Shanghai, China | September 15–17 | |
| GDC Next 2013 | Los Angeles, California | November 5–7 | |
2014
| GDC 2014 | San Francisco, California | March 17–21 | |
| GDC Europe 2014 | Cologne, Germany | August 11–13 | |
| GDC China 2014 | Shanghai, China | October 19–21 | |
| GDC Next 2014 | Los Angeles, California | November 3–4 | |
2015
| GDC 2015 | San Francisco, California | March 2–6 | |
| GDC Europe 2015 | Cologne, Germany | August 3–4 | |
| GDC China 2015 | Shanghai, China | October 25–27 | |
2016
| GDC 2016 | San Francisco, California | March 14–18 | |
| GDC Europe 2016 | Cologne, Germany | August 15–16 | |
2017
| GDC 2017 | San Francisco, California | February 27 – March 3 | |
2018
| GDC 2018 | San Francisco, California | March 19–23 | |
2019
| GDC 2019 | Moscone Convention Center; San Francisco, California | March 18–22 | 27,000 |
2020
| GDC Summer 2020 | Virtual event only | August 4–6 | |
2021
| GDC 2021 | Online and San Francisco, California (Hybrid event) | July 19–23 | |
2022
| GDC 2022 | San Francisco, California | March 21–25 | 12,000 + 5,000 virtual |
2023
| GDC 2023 | San Francisco, California | March 20–24 | 28,000 |
2024
| GDC 2024 | San Francisco, California | March 18–22 | 30,000 |
2025
| GDC 2025 | San Francisco, California | March 17–21 | 30,000 |
2026
| GDC 2026 ("Festival of Games") | San Francisco, California | March 9–13 | 20,000 |

== See also ==
- Game development
- Electronic Entertainment Expo
- Gamescom
- Brasil Game Show
- Tokyo Game Show
