= Agitprop (album) =

Studio album by Kalahari Surfers
- Released: 2012
- Label: Sjambokmusic.com

Kalahari Surfers chronology
One Party State (2010)	Agitprop (2012)

Agitprop is a 2012 album by the Kalahari Surfers, the recording identity of South African musician Warrick Sony. Agitprop was released on Sjambok Music; it was first played at the Unyazi Festival in Durban in September. Agitprop explores Sony's fears about South Africa in the 2010s becoming a one party state under the African National Congress, and includes a song about chemical warfare scientist Wouter Basson. South African Rolling Stone compared it to the KLF, Sly and Robbie and Pink Floyd, and described its "slow evolution of nuance" towards the "desolately upbeat" "Hostile Takeover". Sony says the album was mostly written on the train while commuting to work; he calls the genre "Voktronic, ... a blend of folktronic, and volkspiele with a dose of electronic experimental dubstoep and experimental rolled up into one fat two blade stereo hit."

== Track listing ==
1. "Ambush Street" 03:28
2. "Human Wrongs (Chernobyl 25th Anniversary)" 04:52
3. "Brother Leader" 05:46
4. "The Lost Soul of Dr. Basson" 04:10
5. "Che Guevara & the Voodoo Boys" 04:17
6. "Hostile Takeover" 04:27
7. "Close To Tears" 04:12
8. "The Last Tourist" 03:41
9. "Wings of a Stingray" 05:29
10. "Black Southeaster" 05:24
11. "Without Slipping" 04:00
12. "Hide The Electricity" 05:12
13. "The Curse Of The Birds" 04:10
14. "The Actual Size" 04:38
15. "Carolines Circle" 04:21
16. "Blue Light Brigade" 05:06
