= Akasic Record =

Studio album by Kalahari Surfers
- Released: 2001
- Label: African Dope

Kalahari Surfers chronology
Bigger than Jesus	Akasic Record (2001)	Muti Media (2003)

Akasic Record is a 2001 album by the Kalahari Surfers, the recording identity of South African musician Warrick Sony. Akashic records are part of a mystical state said to immediately follow accidental death. The album is "a highly sophisticated foray into African-flavoured dubfunk".

== Track listing ==
1. "Dig It" 06:52
2. "9866" 04:53
3. "Kicked By The Ball" 04:47
4. "Shikhar Tal" 08:16
5. "High Ground" 06:30
6. "Gangsta" 05:20
7. "Taako" 05:42
8. "Devi Dasi" 06:37
9. "Noise Rem" 05:39
10. "Gethsemane" 06:20
11. "Temptation" 07:16
12. "Leka-Leka" 06:44
