= Maishe Maponya =

South African political activist (1951–2021)

Maishe Maphonya
- Born: 1951; Alexandra Township
- Died: 2021 (aged 69–70)

Maishe Maphonya (1951-2021) was a South Africa political activist, playwright, director and poet. Maponya was born in Alexandra Township but his family was forcibly relocated to Diepkloof, Soweto in 1961.

== Biography and career ==
Maishe Maponya, born on 4 September 1951 during the apartheid era in Alexandra Township, in South Africa. Later his family was forcibly removed to Diepkloof, Soweto. His love for reading and writing was sparked at an early age, this is also when he became politically conscious and began to write poetry and stage productions that reflected the conditions of Black people in South Africa. He died in 2021. He is known for using his plays as a means to raise social and political awareness. UNISA has honoured Maishe Maponya with an archive that holds many of his works. Comprising primary sources such as scripts, correspondence, publications, photographs, audio-visual materials and art portraits. The collection is predominantly in English.

Educational history a Master’s degree in Theatre Studies from Leeds University. Career He was a playwright. He Lectured at the University of the Witwatersrand. In 2001, he was appointed Director of Arts and Culture in the Department of Arts, Culture, Technology, and Science at the University of the Witwatersrand.
