= Fikile Magadlela =

South African Artist

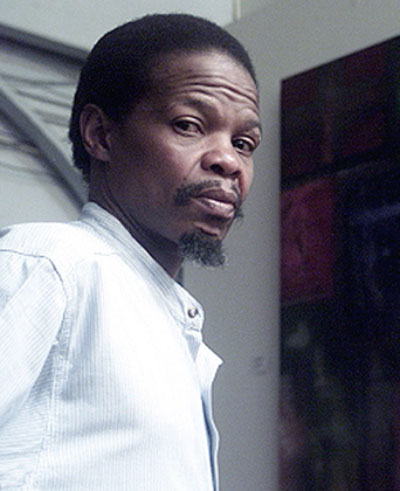
- Born: 13 December 1952
- Died: 2003 (aged 50–51)

Fikile Patrick Magadlela (13 December 1952 – 2003) was a visual artist of the Black Consciousness movement in South Africa, recognized for his art's mystical and poetic quality, also noted for "subversive" and political art. He has been called an "African surrealist."

He was born in Newclare, Johannesburg South Africa. He started drawing on his parents’ walls from as early as he could remember.

Reading books his father bought and getting knowledge from older people. He dropped out of High school in standard 8 (10th grade) to work as a full-time artist. Magadlela was relatively self-taught but he spent many hours with fellow artists exchanging ideas and techniques.

Magadlela worked closely with artists such as Ezrom Legae, Solly Maphiri, Winston Saoli, Percy Sedumedi, Pietro Cuzzolini and Harold Jeppe who became his mentor, introducing him to art circles in Johannesburg.

His most renowned work was entitled “Birth of The Second Creation” a series of drafted, mystical landscapes showing an African man and woman in flowing drapery and overwhelming clouds.

Later Magadlela would do bolder landscapes with similar characters using more colour and poetry. His first exhibition first solo exhibition was at the Goodman Gallery then owned by Linda Givon in 1978.

Berman Gallery 1992. Retrospective at the UNISA Art Gallery 1995

Magadlela died 2003
