= List of cancelled Game Boy Advance games =

The Game Boy Advance is a handheld video game console released by Nintendo in 2001. While seen as a success, the platform featured a shorter lifespan than its predecessor Game Boy systems, partially due to the early release and runaway success of the Nintendo DS. Originally promoted as a separate product, the DS, released in 2004, replaced the GBA as Nintendo and other software developers focused on its stronger hardware as it competed with Sony's PlayStation Portable. Its shorter lifespan, along with publishers dropping multiplatform games due to lack of interest in its weaker hardware, would lead to game cancellations. This list documents games that were confirmed to be announced or in development for the Game Boy Advance at some point, but did not end up being released for it in any capacity.

== Games ==
There are currently 61 games on this list. (Note: This number is always up to date by this script.)

List of cancelled Game Boy Advance games
Title(s)	Notes/Reasons	Developer	Publisher
100 Bullets	A video game adaption of the 100 Bullets comic book series was announced by Acclaim Entertainment for release on the PlayStation 2 and original Xbox. This version of the game was cancelled amid Acclaim's financial troubles in the mid-2000s. D3 Publisher obtained the rights to the franchise shortly after, and announced plans to release an unrelated game in the franchise for a variety of platforms, Game Boy Advance included, though none of those versions ever materialized either. The comic's primary writer, Brian Azzarello later reported that there were trouble translating the comic's story into the video game format.		D3 Publisher
Aero the Acro-Bat 2	Following the release of the original Aero the Acro-Bat on Game Boy Advance in 2002, a press release indicated that its Sega Genesis and SNES follow ups Aero the Acro-Bat 2 (1994) and Zero the Kamikaze Squirrel (1994) would also be released on the GBA, though neither of those releases ever materialized.	Atomic Planet Entertainment	Metro3D
Animaniacs: Hollywood Hypnotics	In 2001, a video game adaption of the Animaniacs animated television show was announced for the Game Boy Advance. The game was in development by Full Fat and was scheduled to be published by Conspiracy Entertainment in 2003, but was ultimately shelved. Development restarted from scratch at the request of publisher Swing! Entertainment before being cancelled due to Swing!'s financial issues. A nearly finished prototype of the game was later discovered and released online in 2025.	Full Fat	Conspiracy Entertainment, Swing! Entertainment
Aliens versus Predator	French developer Ubi Soft announced that they had obtained the rights to release an entry in the Aliens versus Predator series of video games for the Game Boy Advance in 2003. Little was announced other than it would loosely follow the premise of prior entries, which entailed a 3-way battle between a Xenomorph (Alien), Predator, and a human. Despite the announcement, no such release ever materialized.	Ubi Soft	Ubi Soft
Barbarian	A scaled-down version of the 2002 console game was announced for the Game Boy Advance as well, but never materialized. The game was announced to have the same gameplay of the console games — similar to Power Stone — and feature 4 player multiplayer through the use of the GBA Link Cable.	Titus Interactive	Titus Interactive
Battletoads	GameSetWatch reported that in 2011, an early prototype for an unannounced entry in the Battletoads series that was briefly in development for the Game Boy Advance had leaked onto the internet. The game was to be made less difficult than its earlier counterparts, and had characters modernized with a more cyberpunk/skateboarder aesthetic. The game was cancelled early in development, with the prototype being very unfinished.	Rare	Rare
Bejeweled	A version of the PC and mobile puzzle game was announced for a 2004 on the Game Boy Advance as well, though this version never materialized.	PopCap Games	Majesco
Black Sigil: Blade of the Exiled	Development initially began late in the Game Boy Advance's lifespan, and went well beyond it, eventually moving its successor, the Nintendo DS, where it released in 2009.	Studio Archcraft	Graffiti Entertainment
A Boy and His Blob: Jelly's Cosmic Adventure	A sequel to A Boy and His Blob: Trouble on Blobolonia (1989) was announced for the Game Boy Advance at E3 2001. The game was reported to be cancelled around 2005, after a separate sequel for the Nintendo DS was announced, though the DS game would be cancelled as well.	Pipe Dream Interactive	Majesco
The Chaos Engine	One of three older Bitmap Brothers games announced in 2002 for an updated release for the Game Boy Advance through a partnership with Crawfish Entertainment that never materialized in any capacity.	Bitmap Brothers	Crawfish Entertainment
Charlie's Angels	A video game adaption of the year 2000 film was announced for PlayStation 2, GameCube, the original Xbox, PC platforms, and Game Boy Advance, though only the PS2 and GameCube versions ever released years later in 2003.	Ubi Soft	Ubi Soft
Chronos Twins	Originally announced for the Game Boy Advance in 2004, development moved to its successor, the Nintendo DS, in 2006, and released there exclusively the following year.	EnjoyUp	Oxygen Games
Contact	Development for the game began on the Game Boy Advance, but transitioned to its successor, the Nintendo DS, where it released exclusively in 2006. The GBA version had the same basic premise, but would have required switching between different viewpoints rather than showing both concurrently as was done on the DS's dual screen setup.	Grasshopper Manufacture	Marvelous Entertainment
Cool Herders	Originally unofficially released as a homebrew video game for the Sega Dreamcast, its developer later sought to release the game on a Nintendo handheld. Initial efforts included creating a version for the Game Boy Advance, which, while successful, was done so late in its lifespan that they were unable to find a publisher to release it. While they were able to secure a publisher, Alten8, for a Nintendo DS version, Alten8 pulled out of the industry before the DS version could be completed. Plans changed to self-publishing as a DSiWare title, and the game advanced to a 90% complete status, along with new content added. However, the developer suffered from burnout and a lack of money to finish the project, and the game was cancelled. The developer legally released the 90% complete beta of the DS version onto the internet in 2021.	Harmless Lion	Alten8, Harmless Lion
Custom Robo GX 2	A sequel to Custom Robo GX (2002) was originally planned for release on the Game Boy Advance. At the time, the core Custom Robo team at Noise was focused on Custom Robo Battle Revolution (2004), so development duties on GX2 were given to a different team instead. Substantial changes were made to the gameplay formula, but series producer Koji Kenjo felt the game was not fun and diverged too heavily from Custom Robo's core gameplay, so the project was shelved. Development restarted from scratch with Kenjo as director, now under the tentative name "GX3", before the decision was made in late 2004 to move the project to the Nintendo DS, where it was eventually released as Custom Robo Arena (2006).		Nintendo
Demon Hunter	Announced in 2002 as an action RPG similar to Diablo with large, randomly generated levels that could be played indefinitely even after being the main campaign. The developers were aiming for an early 2003 release despite not procuring a publisher yet, though the game was cancelled before any announcement on a publisher, and never materialized in any capacity.	Independent Arts Software	
Diablo Junior	Following the release of Diablo II (2000), a team of developers at Blizzard Entertainment pitched a prequel to Diablo (1997) for Game Boy Advance. However, it was decided to move the project to the original Game Boy due to its larger install base. Concepts such as multiple connected versions with alternate playable characters were explored during development. Ultimately, the decision was made to cancel the project due to concerns about the game's commercial viability and the team's unfamiliarity with making games for Game Boy.	Blizzard South	Blizzard Entertainment
Diddy Kong Pilot	Originally announced in 2001 as a sequel to Diddy Kong Racing (1997), the game went through a difficult 5 year development period that was further complicated by developer Rare's purchase by Microsoft mid-way through development. The purchase led to Nintendo revoking their access to their IP such as Donkey Kong and Diddy Kong. The game was repurposed and reworked into Banjo Pilot, which released on the GBA in 2005. Multiple in-process prototypes of the original Diddy Kong Pilot versions leaked onto the internet in the 2010s.	Rare	Nintendo
Diner Dash	After finding success on PC and mobile platforms in 2005, versions for handheld consoles, including the PlayStation Portable, Nintendo DS, and Game Boy Advance were announced the following year. By the time their 2007 release date arose, the GBA version was dropped in favor of the PSP and DS releases, which were more prominent handhelds by that point in time.	Gamelab	Eidos Interactive
Donkey Kong Coconut Crackers	Initially announced in 2001 as a puzzle game utilizing Donkey Kong Country characters, similar to Diddy Kong Pilot, the game had to be reworked and rebranded after developer Rare was bought by Microsoft and as a result lost the rights to use Nintendo IP like Donkey Kong. The game was reworked to use Rare's own "Mr. Pants" mascot and released as It's Mr. Pants in 2004.	Rare	Nintendo
Dune: Ornithopter Assault	A 3D shooter video game based on the Dune film series was in development for the Game Boy Advance. The game, billed on its press release as what would have been "the first Dune game on a handheld", would have consisted of 20 different levels and a multiplayer mode that could be played across 2 GBA systems through the GBA Link Cable. Development was almost complete in 2002, but was cancelled just prior to release due to its publisher's financial issues. In the years following, a playable build of the game leaked onto the internet.	Soft Brigade	Cryo Interactive
Game Boy Advance Video	In 2004, Majesco began releasing Game Boy Advance Video, a line of GBA cartridges containing viewable episodes of various animated series. Over 30 different Video Paks were released between 2004–2006. Several shows that received "Volume 1" releases in the line had "Volume 2" releases that were advertised but never materialized, including Dragon Ball GT, Sonic X, Strawberry Shortcake, Teenage Mutant Ninja Turtles, and Yu-Gi-Oh!.	DC Studios	Majesco
Game Boy Music	The music game Daigasso! Band Brothers went through a difficult, five year development cycle that started under the name Game Boy Music on the Game Boy Color, transitioned to the Game Boy Advance, and then moved a second time to the Nintendo DS, where it finally released in 2004. The Game Boy iterations were cancelled due to their hardware limitations; the developers felt the Game Boy sound systems could not create a high enough quality of sound, and lacked enough buttons for gameplay input. The DS hardware and touch screen helped them finally solve these issues.	Nintendo	Nintendo
GB Rally Advance	After cancelling a similar rally racing game for the Game Boy Color, the development team moved on to creating a 3D version of the concept for the Game Boy Advance. The game was to feature 42 difference races courses, and the ability for 4 player multiplayer through the GBA Link Cable. However, much like the GBC iteration, the developers did not have a publisher for the game, and it too never materialized.	Raylight Studios	
Gods	One of three older Bitmap Brothers games announced in 2002 for an updated release for the Game Boy Advance through a partnership with Crawfish Entertainment that never materialized in any capacity. A DS version was later announced, though that version did not release either.	Bitmap Brothers	Crawfish Entertainment
Grand Theft Auto III	At E3 2001, Rockstar Games announced that they were partnering with Destination Software to adapt some of their biggest PlayStation 2 games into alternate versions that could be played on a Game Boy Advance. Three were announced — Smuggler's Run, Midnight Club and Grand Theft Auto III. While the first two released, the Grand Theft Auto attempt was cancelled in favor of the unrelated Grand Theft Auto Advance (2004).	Crawfish Interactive	Destination Software
The Haunted Mansion	A video game adaption of the Disney ride of the same name, rather than the 2003 film of the same name, was announced for PlayStation 2, GameCube, the original Xbox, and Game Boy Advance. The GBA version was to be simplified, but still maintain 3D movement and gameplay, a relative rarity for the platform. Screenshots for the GBA version game were released during development, but it was the only iteration of the game to never release.	Pocket Studios	Ingram Entertainment
Haven: Call of the King	During a preview playtest of the PlayStation 2, GameCube and original Xbox versions of the game, a Game Boy Advance version was also mentioned by GameSpot. Little was mentioned other than it was "designed the game to push all the hardware platforms it appears on, including the Game Boy Advance." Only the PS2 version ever released.	Traveller's Tales	Midway Games
Heart of Darkness	A version of the 1998 PlayStation and Windows game was announced for the Game Boy Advance in 2001, but never materialized.	Amazing Studios	Infogrames
He-Man: Defender of Grayskull	A follow-up to 2002’s He-Man: Power of Grayskull was in development for GameCube, Xbox, PlayStation 2 and Game Boy Advance. The game went unreleased on all four platforms, although the PlayStation 2 version saw a release through another publisher in Europe.		TDK Mediactive
Hi Hi Puffy AmiYumi: Puffy AmiYumi and the Manga Madman	Following the release of Hi Hi Puffy AmiYumi: Kaznapped! (2005), based on the Hi Hi Puffy AmiYumi animated series, developer Altron began development on a sequel, but it was cancelled before ever being announced. A prototype of the game was discovered in 2024.	Altron	D3 Publisher
The Holy Bible	Not a game adaption, but an actual text recreation of the Bible was in development for the Game Boy Advance, similar to King James Bible (1994) for Game Boy. It was largely completed, and far enough along to have box art and a release date of November 2006, but it never released. It later leaked onto the internet in 2023.	Rainbow Mission	Crave Entertainment, 505 GameStreet
Hyperspace Delivery Boy!	A simple puzzle game first released for Pocket PC PDA 2001, while versions for PC platforms later released, the announced Game Boy Advance version never did.	Monkeystone Games	Majesco
i-Ninja	A version of the 2004 GameCube, PlayStation 2, original Xbox, and PC game originally had a Game Boy Advance companion game in development as well, but it was cancelled. The GBA version was simplified down due to the weaker hardware, but still attempted to emulate many of the main game's features and mechanics. A playable prototype version of the game leaked onto the internet in 2024.	Argonaut Games	Namco Hometek
Kien	A game for the Game Boy Advance that mixed elements of platformers and role-playing video games. It was scheduled for release in 2002, and was far enough along to have review copies sent out to publications like Nintendo Power, but was cancelled just prior to release. Three separate publishers ended up cancelling plans to publish it themselves over the course of the GBA's lifespan. The game at some point leaked onto the internet, and decades later, received an after-market release by Incube8 Games on June 14, 2024.	AgeofGames	
Magic Pockets	One of three older Bitmap Brothers games announced in 2002 for an updated release for the Game Boy Advance through a partnership with Crawfish Entertainment that never materialized in any capacity.	Bitmap Brothers	Crawfish Entertainment
Mario Kart XXL	Turrican creator Manfred Trenz created a demo for his vision of a Mario Kart game on the Game Boy Advance in 2004, and pitched it to Nintendo, who rejected the pitch. Nintendo went on to release Mario Kart DS on the Nintendo DS the following year instead. The playable demo leaked onto the internet in 2022.	Denaris Entertainment Software	
Mary-Kate and Ashley in Action!	A video game adaptation of the cartoon of the name starring popular twin duo Mary-Kate and Ashley Olsen was reported to have been in the works for a 2003 release for the Game Boy Advance, GameCube and PlayStation 2. The game was never officially announced, only being revealed in a March 2004 lawsuit that the Olsen twins filed against Acclaim over unpaid royalties, with IGN and GameSpot reporting that the game's cancellation was what led to the partnership between Acclaim Entertainment and the girls' company Dualstar falling apart.		Acclaim Entertainment
Mega Man Anniversary Collection	Initially announced as Mega Man Mania, Anniversary Collection was a compilation of all five Mega Man games originally released for the Game Boy between 1991 and 1994, remastered to feature full color graphics. The game underwent several delays before being ultimately cancelled in January 2006.	Capcom	Capcom
Metal Slug series	Following the release of Metal Slug Advance (2004), ports of Metal Slug 1, 2, 3 and X were announced for individual release on the Game Boy Advance. In 2006, all four were cancelled in favor of the multi-platform compilation release of Metal Slug Anthology, which bundled these titles alongside Metal Slug 5 and Metal Slug 6 for release on the PlayStation Portable, Wii, and PlayStation 2.	SNK Playmore	SNK Playmore
Mythri	The role playing game Mythri began development for Game Boy Color at the independent studio Team XKalibur, who sought to create a game inspired by classic Japanese RPGs such as Final Fantasy. After years of development, progress stalled due to being unable to find a publisher to fund development. In 2003, the game was picked up by publisher Variant Entertainment, with plans to move development to Game Boy Advance. However, Variant never ended up providing the necessary funding, forcing the team to cancel the game and split up to work at other studios. Tomm Hulett, one of the game's designers, later released the game's prototype onto the internet in 2016.	Team XKalibur	Variant Interactive
Oggy and the Cockroaches	A video game adaption of the cartoon of the same name was announced for the Game Boy Advance in 2004. The game was present at E3 2004, where footage was shown as it being a 2D platformer, and it was scheduled for release months later in Q3 2004, but the game never materialized.	Xilam	Telegames
Quake	Randy Linden, the programmer responsible for completing the thought-to-be-impossible port of Doom (1993) to the SNES in 1995, created a playable prototype of Quake for the Game Boy Advance. His initial intent was to pitch the game to id Software for official release, but the dwindling popularity of the GBA led him instead chose to repurpose his work into the release of his own original IP, Cyboid, instead, something he was able to do because he did not use any of Quake's original assets in its creation. A playable version of the game leaked onto the internet in 2022.	Randy Linden	id Software
Rick Dangerous	A version of the 1989 PC platformer was announced to be in development for the Game Boy Advance by developers Spoutnick Team, though the following year they announced that the copyright holders of the game were now refusing to sell them the rights to release the game due to "internal reasons", leading to its cancellation. The team noted that they hoped that "internal reasons" meant that a different development team was working on a game in the series, though no further games have been release to date.	Spoutnick Team	
RoboCop	In 1999, Titus Interactive announced they had obtained the rights to release video game adaptions of the RoboCop film franchise. While the Game Boy Color version released two years later in 2001, the announced Game Boy Advance version, despite making an appearance at E3 2001, never materialized.	Titus Interactive	Titus Interactive
Rolling	The roller skating game in the vein of the Tony Hawk's Pro Skater games was originally announced in 2002 and in development for the PlayStation 2, original Xbox, GameCube, and the Game Boy Advance. However, during development, developer Rage Software suffered financial issues that eventually lead to its closure in 2003. The game was almost cancelled outright, until new publisher, SCi Games came in to salvage their work and release the game later that year. However, SCi only chose to release the PS2 and Xbox version; the GameCube and GBA versions went unreleased.	Rage Software	Majesco
Saffire	Initially beginning development as a Nintendo 64 game, Saffire was an action-adventure game featuring characters from Greek mythology. Alongside the main GameCube and PlayStation 2 versions, the story was set to be expanded through versions for Game Boy Color and Game Boy Advance and a comic miniseries from Image Comics. While the comics launched in April 2000, none of the video games ever saw release.	Saffire	Saffire
Shantae Advance: Risky Revolution	Shortly before the release of Shantae (2002), WayForward began work on a sequel for Game Boy Advance. However, the company struggled to find a publisher due to the weak sales of the first game, leading them to shelve the project in 2004. The work done on Shantae Advance would go on to influence several later titles in the series, most significantly Shantae: Risky's Revenge (2010). In 2023, WayForward announced that development had resumed on Shantae Advance. The game received an aftermarket physical release on Game Boy Advance through Limited Run Games in 2025, followed by emulated releases on newer platforms the same year.	WayForward	
Shaun Palmer's Pro Snowboarder 2	A sequel to Shaun Palmer's Pro Snowboarder (2001) was announced for the PlayStation 2, original Xbox, GameCube, and the Game Boy Advance in 2002, but was cancelled on all platforms the following year due to publisher Activision's poor financial performance at the time.	Vicarious Visions	Activision
Sonic Riders	While never publicly announced at the time, Sega commissioned Backbone Entertainment for an adaptation of the original Sonic Riders (2006) game for the weaker Game Boy Advance hardware. A prototype was produced and sent to Sega of Japan, who approved of the work, but requested more 3D elements be added to the game. Unable to make the changes with the limited hardware and time left until its intended release date, the GBA version was cancelled. Years later, developers from Backbone would talk publicly about the game, and note that, while the game was cancelled, Sega was impressed by the effort, and it led to further collaborations throughout the 2000s, including the Sonic Rivals games.	Backbone Entertainment	Sega
Star Trek: Invasion	One of two Activision games that had been licensed by publisher Classified Games to develop an iteration for the Game Boy Advance. The deal was mentioned in Activision's 2000 financial report a year prior to the GBA's release, but never ended up materializing.	Classified Games	Classified Games
Static Shock	A video game adaption of the animated television show was announced at E3 2003 and present in playable form. The game was far enough along to have a review copy sent to Nintendo Power for their March 2004 issue, though the game was cancelled and never actually released.	Vicarious Visions	Midway Games
Super Princess Peach	The game originally started development as a Game Boy Advance game, but development shifted to its successor, the Nintendo DS, where it solely released in 2005.	Tose	Nintendo
Tenchu	One of three games Activision announced to be making Game Boy Advance iterations of in a financial report in 2000 — a year prior to the GBA's release — that never ended upmaterializing.		Classified Games
The Thing	A video game sequel to the 1982 film The Thing was announced in 2000 for multiple platforms, including the Game Boy Color and Game Boy Advance. However, neither portable version was ever released.		Konami
Tork: Prehistoric Punk	A port of the Xbox exclusive was in development for Game Boy Advance, but failed to materialize.	Realism Studios	Ubisoft
Tyrian 2000	A port of Tyrian (1995), based on its Tyrian 2000 (1999) re-release, was being produced for Game Boy Color and Game Boy Advance by members of the game's original development team. However, the game's publisher Symmetry Entertainment went out of business, leading to the game's cancellation. In 2007, original programmer Jason Emery released the ROMs for both versions onto the internet.	World Tree Games	Symmetry Entertainment
Vigilante 8: 2nd Offense	One of two Activision games that had been licensed by publisher Classified Games to develop an iteration for the Game Boy Advance. The deal was mentioned in Activision's 2000 financial report a year prior to the GBA's release, but never ended up materializing.	Classified Games	Classified Games
Wizards	Announced as a sequel to Warlocked (2000) was announced for the Game Boy Advance, but was cancelled mid-way through development.	Bits Studios	
Xyanide Advance	A version of the original Xbox game Xyanide (2006) was in development for the Game Boy Advance prior to its original version being released, but was cancelled prior to release.	Engine Software	Playlogic Entertainment
Zero the Kamikaze Squirrel	Following the release of the original Aero the Acro-Bat on Game Boy Advance in 2002, a press release indicated that its Sega Genesis and SNES follow ups Aero the Acro-Bat 2 (1994) and Zero the Kamikaze Squirrel (1994) would also be released on the GBA, though neither of those releases ever materialized.	Atomic Planet Entertainment	Metro3D
