= List of cancelled Nintendo DS games =

The Nintendo DS is a handheld video game console released by Nintendo in 2004. This list documents games that were confirmed for the Nintendo DS at some point, but did not end up being released for it in any capacity.

== Games ==
There are currently 33 games on this list. (Note: This number is always up to date by this script.)

List of cancelled Nintendo DS games
Title(s)	Notes/Reasons	Developer	Publisher
100 Bullets	A video game adaption of the 100 Bullets comic book series was announced by Acclaim Entertainment for release on the PlayStation 2 and original Xbox. This version of the game was cancelled amid Acclaim's financial troubles in the mid-2000s. D3 Publisher obtained the rights to the franchise shortly after, and announced plans to release an unrelated game in the franchise for a variety of platforms, Nintendo DS included, though none of those versions ever materialized either. The comic's primary writer, Brian Azzarello, later explained that the developers had trouble translating the comic's story into the video game format.		D3 Publisher
Angry Birds	A version of the original Angry Birds was planned to be launched on the Nintendo DSi alongside a Wii version as a DSiWare game on the former and as a WiiWare game on the latter, along with the PlayStation Portable and PlayStation 3 release. While these versions were never released (with the exception of the afore mentioned PSP release), it's believed that the work done on these versions eventually led to Angry Birds Trilogy, which came out on all consoles with the exception of DS and PSP.	Rovio	
Batman: Arkham Asylum	A Nintendo DS iteration of the 2009 PlayStation 3 and Xbox 360 game was never announced, but leaked onto the internet in 2020. The prototype, while playable, was limited to only a few rooms, with Batman only able to perform basic 3D movement and use simple beat 'em up moves to attack an enemy. The game was being developed by Full Fat, a company known for making similar handheld versions of other licensed properties.	Full Fat	Eidos Interactive
Black & White Creatures	A spinoff of the Black & White series of games was announced for the Nintendo DS and PlayStation Portable in May 2005. While the original was a large scale god game for PC platforms, the handheld versions were more of a smaller scale pet simulator adaption of the original concept. A very early 20% complete version of the game was playable at E3 2005, but the game was eventually cancelled. A similarly very early, barely playable build of the game leaked onto the internet in 2021.	Full Fat	Majesco
A Boy and His Blob	A sequel to A Boy and His Blob: Trouble on Blobolonia (1990) was announced to be in development for the Nintendo DS by Skyworks Technologies, a development team founded by original A Boy and His Blob creators Garry Kitchen and David Crane. The game would have retained the 2D platformer gameplay of its predecessor, but would have featured the "boy" now being a teenager. The game was present and playable at E3 2005, but reportedly only 20% complete, despite being scheduled for release later in the year. Publisher Majesco's financial troubles led to the game's cancellation, with them instead opting to pursue a remake, A Boy and His Blob (2009), with WayForward. A two level, 40% complete version of the game leaked onto the internet in 2022.	Skyworks Technologies	Majesco
ClayFighter: Call of Putty	A revival of the ClayFighter series was announced for release via WiiWare and DSiWare, but never came to fruition.	StudioBlack Games	Interplay Entertainment
Cool Herders	Originally unofficially released as a homebrew video game for the Sega Dreamcast, its developer later sought to release the game on a Nintendo handheld. Initial efforts included creating a version for the Game Boy Advance, which, while successful, was done so late in its lifespan that they were unable to find a publisher to release it. While they were able to secure a publisher, Alten8, for a Nintendo DS version, Alten8 pulled out of the industry before the DS version could be completed. Plans changed to self-publishing as a DSiWare title, and the game advanced to a 90% complete status, along with new content added. However, the developer suffered from burnout and a lack of money to finish the project, and the game was cancelled. The developer legally released the 90% complete beta version onto the internet in 2021.	Harmless Lion	Alten8, Harmless Lion
Crash Landed	Developer Renegade Kid created a prototype for a Nintendo DS entry in the Crash Bandicoot series around 2008 and 2009. While multiple Crash games were released for the DS, Renegade's pitch was not picked up by Activision, who owned the rights to the IP. Footage of the game leaked onto the internet in 2013, which showed it to feature a fully game 3D world. The footage was verified as real by development team member Jools Watsham, who noted the prototype was developed in just two weeks.	Renegade Kid	
Crash Tag Team Racing	A scaled-down handheld version of the game was originally announced for the Nintendo DS, but was cancelled due to the publisher's belief that Mario Kart DS, which had the same late 2005 release timeframe, would overshadow and hurt its sales. While the game was reportedly almost complete prior to cancellation, no game footage of the DS version was ever officially released, though some game assets and artwork leaked onto the internet in 2015.	Sensory Sweep Studios	Sierra Entertainment
De Blob	A version of the 2008 Wii and iOS device game was in development for the Nintendo DS, but was cancelled when the developer, Helixe, was closed down due to publisher THQ's ongoing financial issues at the time. A three-level playable build of the game leaked onto the internet in 2023.	Helixe	THQ
Dirty Harry	A video game continuing the story of the 1971 film Dirty Harry was announced in 2005, and was set to feature Clint Eastwood reprising his role as Harry Callahan. While planned to launch on multiple systems in 2007, including the Wii, the project was cancelled that year due to development issues.	Sensory Sweep Studios	Warner Bros. Interactive
Duke Nukem Trilogy	At E3 2008, Deep Silver and Apogee announced three new entries in the Duke Nukem series for the Nintendo DS and PSP, under the collective name "Duke Nukem Trilogy". The three games, subtitled Critical Mass, Chain Reaction, and Proving Grounds, would form a continuous narrative of Duke traveling through time to different eras, such as the future or World War II. However, the games underwent a troubled multi-year development process, and only the DS version of Critical Mass was released in 2011, with PSP version and the other two games being cancelled.	Frontline Studios	Apogee Entertainment, Deep Silver
Elf Bowling Collector's Edition	A compilation of games in the Elf Bowling series was planned for release, but never materialized.		Detn8 Games
Foodfight!	A 3D platformer based on the animated film Foodfight! was being developed for Wii, PlayStation 2, Xbox, and Nintendo DS. The game began development in 2004 and was publicly shown at E3 2006. However, due to the film's repeated delays and infamously troubled production cycle, the decision was made to cancel the game in 2008, four years before the film would eventually be released.	Cat Daddy Games	Global Star Software
The Fairly OddParents	A video game adaption of the animated series The Fairly OddParents was announced for the DS at E3 2005, but never materialized.		THQ
Gauntlet DS	An iteration of the Gauntlet series was in development for the Nintendo DS. The game would have supported local and online multiplayer across four DS systems, and would have been the first series entry to include an experience point system. The game was scheduled for release in 2008, and was far enough along to be playable at events like the Penny Arcade Expo that year. The game was reportedly completed, but its release was cancelled due to the publisher's belief that the market for this sort of game had dried up. The game leaked onto the internet prior to 2020.	Backbone Entertainment	Eidos Interactive
Geist	A Nintendo DS version of the 2005 GameCube game was never officially announced, but revealed to be in development in the large-scale 2020 Nintendo data leak.	n-Space	Nintendo
Gods	A version of the 1991 SNES, Sega Genesis, and PC game was in development for the Nintendo DS in 2007, progressing far enough to get the game up and running on the DS, albeit without any sound implemented. The project was ultimately part-way through after the developer had learned the publisher would not be offering a publishing contract for the game.	The Bitmap Brothers	Asylum
Heroes of Hyrule	After the completion of Metroid Prime 2 (2004), developer Retro Studios created a pitch for a Final Fantasy Tactics-styled game in the Legend of Zelda universe. A 22-page design document, alongside a written premise/setting and concept art, was created and pitched to Nintendo. The pitch was immediately rejected; while no exact reason was given, the speed of the rejection led the development team to believe that Nintendo did not have an interest in allowing the franchise to branch out into new genres.	Retro Studios	Nintendo
Mario Motors	A game pitched by game developer Yoot Saito that involved using the DS's touch screen and stylus to craft car motors to give cars varying attributes. While he initially had the support of Nintendo's Satoru Iwata and Shigeru Miyamoto, in the end, the game was cancelled, for reasons Saito stated were "confidential".		Nintendo
Mass Effect: Corsair	While never officially announced, a Mass Effect spinoff game was explored in the mid-2000s for the Nintendo DS. The game would have involved flying a spacecraft from a first person perspective as a Han Solo-type pirate character. Bioware mapped out basic controls for how the flying gameplay would have worked, but the project was cancelled shortly afterwards due to financial reasons. Internal sales projections for a Mass Effect game for the DS were low, and the large cartridge size required for the scope of the project would have made production more costly and further hurt chances at the project being profitable. Some members went on to develop Bioware's Sonic Chronicles (2008) for the platform, while Electronic Arts instead chose to work with IronMonkey Studios for a Mass Effect spinoff on mobile phone platforms, which ended up being Mass Effect Infiltrator (2012).	Bioware	Electronic Arts
Mean Girls	A video game adaption of the 2004 film Mean Girls was announced, but never materialized, without any reason given. An internet fan campaign eventually caught the attention of an anonymous member of the development team, who leaked a buggy but playable unfinished version of the game in the 2020s.	Crush Digital	505 Games
Metroid Dread	Following the release of Metroid Fusion (2002), series producer Yoshio Sakamoto began prototyping a sequel for the Nintendo DS, under the name Metroid Dread. While the game's title was leaked from an internal document in 2005 and became the subject of much public speculation, the project was cancelled due to Sakamoto believing the DS hardware would be insufficient to deliver the intended gameplay. The Dread project would later be revived over a decade later, now as a Nintendo Switch game, for which it was released in 2021.		Nintendo
Plucker	The largescale 2020 Nintendo data leak revealed that Richard Garfield, the creator of Magic the Gathering, had pitched a Nintendo DS strategy game that would have substituted the cards of games like Magic with character figures, though the pitch was never picked up.	Nightlighter	
Pokémon Pinball entry	An iteration of the Pokémon Pinball subseries was in development for the Nintendo DS by Mario Pinball Land developer Fuse Games, scheduled internally for a 2006 release. While never officially announced, the game's existence was discovered as part of the large-scale 2020 Nintendo data leak.	Fuse Games	Nintendo
Shantae: Risky Waters	A new entry in the Shantae series was pitched for the Nintendo DS. The pitch featured gameplay that utilized both of the platform's screens in conjunction with one another; for example, a segment included navigating a raft down a river in 3D on the top screen, while controlling a bird above in 2D space on the bottom screen. The game was cancelled due to WayForward being unable to find a publisher, though another Shantae game, Shantae: Risky's Revenge released on the platform in 2010 via DSiWare.	WayForward	
The Silver Case / The 25th Ward: The Silver Case	A version of the 1999 original PlayStation game and its 2005 mobile sequel was in development for the Nintendo DS. The game was a straight replication of the original, but broken up across the DS's dual screen set up. The conversion was completed in 2009, but went unreleased, as the developers felt the final product wasn't modernized enough for release by that point. Full-remakes were instead made for the PlayStation 4 and Nintendo Switch under the name The Silver Case 2425.	Grasshopper Manufacture	
Speedball 2	A version of the 1990 Sega Genesis and PC game was planned for the Nintendo DS in 2007, though it was cancelled shortly after development began due to the publisher not offering a publishing contract for the game.	The Bitmap Brothers	Asylum
SpongeBob SquarePants: Lights, Camera, Pants!	Ports of the game for Nintendo DS and PlayStation Portable were announced alongside the other versions, but were never released.		THQ
Super Yoshi no Tamago	As part of the October 2024 Game Freak leak, a Nintendo DS prototype was discovered containing a remake of Yoshi (1991). The game's use of "Super" in its title and copyright year of 1995 led many to conclude that the prototype was based on an unreleased Super Famicom version.	Ape Inc., Game Freak	Nintendo
Tetris DS	THQ developed a nearly-finished version of Tetris for the Nintendo DS, but its release was cancelled due to The Tetris Company denying them the rights to release the game, in favor of letting Nintendo develop and publish their own unrelated version of the game under the same name. Only the Nintendo version released in 2006, while THQ sued the Tetris Company over their cancellation of their version. While the lawsuit did not lead to the release of the THQ version, it did unofficially leak onto the internet a decade later in 2016.	THQ	THQ
Toki Tori	A version of Toki Tori was in development for the Nintendo DS, but was cancelled and never released. The DS version would have been based on the 2008 Wii remake. A similar version was later released in 2015 for its successor, the Nintendo 3DS, while three prototypes of the DS version were leaked onto the internet in 2022.	Two Tribes	Two Tribes
Toot & Puddle - An Artic Adventure	A video game based on the animated series Toot & Puddle was planned to release on the Nintendo DS in the third quarter of 2007 alongside a Wii game titled Toot & Puddle: Call of the North, but both were cancelled and never released for unknown reasons.		Zoo Digital Publishing
