= Custom Robo GX =

2002 video game

- Developer: Noise
- Publisher: Nintendo
- Director: Koji Kenjo
- Producers: Shigeru Miyamoto; Kenji Miki
- Designer: Yoshihiro Yamaguchi
- Writer: Yoshihiro Yamaguchi
- Composers: Shinji Hosoe; Ayako Saso
- Series: Custom Robo
- Platform: Game Boy Advance
- Release: JP: July 26, 2002
- Genre: Action role-playing
- Modes: Single-player, multiplayer

Custom Robo GX (Note: Japanese: カスタムロボGX, Hepburn: Kusutamu Robo JīEkkusu) is an action role-playing game developed by Noise, and published by Nintendo for the Game Boy Advance on July 26, 2002, in Japan. The game stayed on Nintendo Power's future release list for a few years, until the release of the next title of the series, Custom Robo: Battle Revolution for the GameCube (known as Custom Robo in North America). NOISE also planned the sequel Custom Robo GX 2, but later dropped it in favor of Custom Robo Arena for the Nintendo DS. Nintendo previously planned to release it in late 2005 in Japan. Custom Robo GX is the third title of the Custom Robo series as well as the last Custom Robo title never released outside Japan.

== Gameplay ==
The battle system of Custom Robo GX

Like other games in the Custom Robo series, Custom Robo GX focuses on battles between miniature robots controlled by humans. Due to the limitations of the Game Boy Advance's hardware, the battle system is presented in a two-dimentional side-scrolling perspective, rather than the 3D battle system seen in other Custom Robo games. The overworld sections hace also been streamlined, with the main character represented as a cursor on the map screen for selecting which place to enter. When the players are inside a place, a pop-up window will give the players choices on what to do inside the place the players are in.

The main object of the whole game is to finish its plot by collecting every Custom Robo, battle part, and other stuff that the player wants, while winning every battle that moves the players from one part of the storyline to the next. In Custom Robo battles, the object is to reduce the hit points of the players' opponent from 1000 to 0 by using different Custom Robos, guns, bombs, pods, and Action-Chips. The exclusive Action-Chip within this version allows the players to create an additional shield of defense or to expand on the players' various maneuvers. In this game, many combinations are present when it comes to the players' specific weapon. This combinational process however is strengthened even greater with the new Action-Chip ability. Battles begin with the players' robo being launched out of a Robocannon which is controlled with the D-pad.

Once shot out of the Robocannon, players have a random amount of time for their Custom Robo to be ready to battle. Custom Robos are arranged in groups that are similar to their abilities. In camera views, unlike other Custom Robo titles, this one has only one, which zooms out whenever two Custom Robos are far from each other, while it zooms in whenever they are close to each other. The endurance bar is located above the players' hit points. Once it runs out, the players' robo gets "downed" which means that it stays fallen for a couple seconds. After it gets up, it goes into "rebirth", where it stays invincible for about 3 seconds. If the player repeatedly loses the same battle, the game offers the option of reducing the opponent's initial health, to make it easier. If the players continue to lose several times, the degree of handicap offered increases up to 75%, giving the opponent a starting 250 HP.

== Reception ==
Famitsu reviewers gave Custom Robo GX a combined score of 30/40.
