= Custom Robo V2 =

2000 video game

- Developer: Noise
- Publisher: Nintendo
- Director: Koji Kenjo
- Designers: Shigeo Sasaki; Yoshitaka Mizushima
- Writer: Koji Kenjo
- Composers: Shinji Hosoe; Ayako Saso; Yasuhisa Watanabe; Yousuke Yasui
- Series: Custom Robo
- Platform: Nintendo 64
- Release: JP: November 10, 2000
- Genre: Action role-playing
- Modes: Single-player, multiplayer

Custom Robo V2 (Note: Japanese: カスタムロボV２, Hepburn: Kasutamu Robo Buitsū) is an action role playing video game developed by Noise and published by Nintendo. It was released for the Nintendo 64 in Japan on November 10, 2000. It was later re-released on February 19, 2008, for the Wii Virtual Console in Japan, and June 8, 2016, for the Wii U Virtual Console. It is the second title of the Custom Robo series, as well as the last of the series for the Nintendo 64. It is also the first title of the series to allow up to four players to play, instead of two players. The game was re-released along with its predecessor on the Nintendo Classics service in Japan in July 2022.

== Gameplay ==
Screenshot of Custom Robo V2

The battle system in Custom Robo V2 is very similar to the first game in the series, except it features tag-teaming, which was never used in later 3D Custom Robo titles except for Custom Robo for the GameCube.

The gameplay of Custom Robo V2 is divided into two main parts: the over world and Robo battles. During the over world, parts of the game play like any other RPG, meaning that the player can control a character in a free roaming world where other characters follow. The main object of the game is to finish its plot by collecting every Robo, battle part, and other items, while winning every battle that moves the character from one part of the storyline to the next.

In Custom Robo battles, the object is to reduce the opponent's hit points from 1000 to 0 by using different Custom Robos, guns, bombs, pods, and dash attacks. Battles begin with both robos being launched out of a Robocannon which is controlled with the control stick. There are six ways your robo can land once shot out of the Robocannon. Custom Robos are arranged in groups that are similar to their abilities. An endurance bar is located above the hit points. Once it runs out the robo gets "downed" which means that it stays fallen for a couple seconds. After it gets up, it goes into "rebirth", where it stays invincible for about 3 seconds.

== Reception ==
Reception

Review scores
Publication	Score
Famitsu	32/40
GameSpot	8.1/10
IGN	8.3/10

Custom Robo V2 sold 62,558 copies during its first week of sale in Japan.
