= The Rescue of Princess Blobette =

1990 video game

- North American cover art by Tim Jacobus
- Developer: Imagineering
- Publishers: JP: Jaleco; NA: Absolute Entertainment; EU: Nintendo
- Designer: David Crane
- Artists: Juan Sanchez; Mark Klein
- Composers: Mark Van Hecke; Alex Demeo
- Series: A Boy and His Blob
- Platform: Game Boy
- Release: JP: November 9, 1990; NA: May 1991; EU: 1991
- Genres: Platform, puzzle
- Mode: Single-player

The Rescue of Princess Blobette / Fushigi na Blobby: Princess Blob o Sukue! (ふしぎなブロビー プリンセス・ブロブを救え!) is a video game for the Game Boy and the sequel to the Nintendo Entertainment System (NES) game A Boy and His Blob: Trouble on Blobolonia. It was published in North America by Imagineering's parent company Absolute Entertainment and in Japan by Jaleco. It was published by Nintendo in Europe.

The Rescue of Princess Blobette follows the two protagonists as they attempt to rescue Princess Blobette from her imprisonment from a castle tower. The game features the same puzzle-platforming gameplay mechanics as Trouble on Blobolonia. Controlling the boy, the player must feed the blob different flavored jelly beans to transform it into different tools to traverse the castle.

The Rescue of Princess Blobette was designed and programmed by David Crane, who also created the original NES game.

== Gameplay ==
Using the licorice jelly bean transforms the blob into a ladder, allowing the boy to reach treasure.

The Rescue of Princess Blobette tells the story of a young, male protagonist and his blob companion as they attempt to rescue the latter's girlfriend, the titular Princess Blobette. The damsel in distress has been imprisoned by the antagonistic Alchemist within the highest tower of the Royal Castle on the planet Blobolonia. Like its predecessor, A Boy and His Blob: Trouble on Blobolonia, The Rescue of Princess Blobette is a puzzle-platformer in which the player directly controls the boy as he is followed around by the blob, who is controlled by the computer AI. The pair must navigate the various passages and floors of the castle to locate and free Blobette. The boy can only run back and forth, cannot jump or swim, and will die if he falls a long distance or comes in contact with dangerous objects such as flamethrowers and sewer serpents. The blob however can be made to turn into useful tools when he is fed jelly beans of various flavors. Each flavor causes a different transformation. For example, feeding the blob a tangerine jelly bean will change him into a trampoline, which the boy can then use to reach high platforms. The player may also locate extra jelly bean sacks and numerous, optional treasures. Finding five peppermints will increase the player's extra lives by one.

== Development ==
The Rescue of Princess Blobette was developed by Imagineering and designed and programmed by David Crane, who was also the lead designer on Trouble on Blobolonia. A then-untitled follow-up to Trouble on Blobolonia was revealed in the September 1990 issue of GamePro. On November 9, The Rescue of Princess Blobette was first released in Japan by Jaleco under the title Fushigi na Blobby: Princess Blob o Sukue! (不思議なブロビー~プリンセス・ブロブを救え!~; lit. "Mysterious Blobby: Rescue Princess Blob!"). Absolute Entertainment, the parent company of Imagineering, published the game in North America during May 1991.

The rights to the A Boy and His Blob series are currently owned by Majesco. This company published a WayForward Technologies remake of A Boy and His Blob: Trouble on Blobolonia on the Wii, simply titled A Boy and His Blob, and re-released the classic NES game on the Wii Virtual Console in 2009. When Sean Velasco, director at WayForward, was asked if they were able to pick up The Rescue of Princess Blobette, he responded: "Blobette is also the property of Majesco, so there is no reason she could not appear in a new game. Oh man, we have such awesome ideas for her!"

== Reception ==
Reception

Review scores
Publication	Score
Computer and Video Games	91%
Nintendojo	6.5/10

Critical reception for The Rescue of Princess Blobette has been relatively positive. Computer and Video Games praised the game as being addictive and fun, and recommended it to players who want something original and have a lot of time on their hands. Nintendo Power echoed these comments, adding that it is challenging to both novice players and players who have already mastered the original A Boy and His Blob. Ed Griffiths of Nintendojo felt the game's graphics and sound to be very plain, but found gameplay mix of puzzles and exploration satisfying for first time players. Griffiths summarized: "It's short and it's not as much fun the second (or hundredth) time through, but this game is still a keeper. It's thoroughly enjoyable while it lasts, and its unique gameplay gives it a well-deserved cult classic status. Still, there are other games out there that'll give you more bang for your buck". 1UP.com writer Ray Barnholt, who is familiar with the original A Boy and His Blob, was thoroughly unimpressed with The Rescue of Princess Blobette. Barnholt disliked the limited room to move, the ability of the blob to accidentally push the boy into a deadly trap, and no way to save one's progress.
