= Pokémon Winds and Waves =

Upcoming video games

Pokémon Winds; Pokémon Waves
- Developer: Game Freak
- Publishers: JP: The Pokémon Company; WW: Nintendo
- Series: Pokémon
- Platform: Nintendo Switch 2
- Release: WW: 2027
- Genre: Role-playing

Pokémon Winds (Note: Japanese: ポケットモンスター ウインド, Hepburn: Poketto Monsutā Uindo) and Pokémon Waves (Note: Japanese: ポケットモンスター ウェーヴ, Hepburn: Poketto Monsutā Wēvu) are upcoming role-playing video games developed by Game Freak and published by Nintendo and The Pokémon Company for the Nintendo Switch 2. Announced on February 27, 2026, the franchise's 30th anniversary, they are the first installments of the tenth generation of the Pokémon video game series. They are set to release in 2027.

== Setting ==
Winds and Waves will be set in a tropical archipelago region resembling Southeast Asia, primarily Indonesia, Malaysia, and parts of the Philippines. It will feature a large number of islands with accessible underwater areas.

== Gameplay ==
The Winds and Waves announcement revealed that the game's 'starter' Pokémon (the ones the player chooses between at the start of the game) will be the Grass-type Browt, the Fire-type Pombon, and the Water-type Gecqua. A leak has claimed that the game will introduce over 300 new Pokémon, including regional forms.

== History ==
In 2024, a major data leak from Game Freak's servers resulted in information about titles in development (including Winds and Waves) being revealed to the public. Winds and Waves were revealed officially in a Pokémon Presents event on February 27, 2026, which also celebrated the 30th anniversary of the Pokémon franchise.
