= Custom Robo (1999 video game) =

- Japanese box art
- Developer: Noise
- Publisher: Nintendo
- Director: Koji Kenjo
- Producer: Tsunekazu Ishihara
- Designers: Shigeo Sasaki; Yoshitaka Mizushima
- Writer: Koji Kenjo
- Composers: Shinji Hosoe; Ayako Saso; Yasuhisa Watanabe
- Series: Custom Robo
- Platforms: Nintendo 64; iQue Player
- Release: Nintendo 64: JP: December 8, 1999; iQue Player: CHN: 2006
- Genre: Action role-playing
- Modes: Single-player, multiplayer

Custom Robo (Note: Japanese: カスタム ロボ, Hepburn: Kasutamu Robo) is an action role-playing video game developed by Noise and published by Nintendo for the Nintendo 64 in 1999 in Japan, and in 2006 for the iQue Player in China. It is the first game in the Custom Robo series. The game and its sequel Custom Robo V2 were re-released on the Nintendo Classics service in Japan in July 2022.

== Gameplay ==
The battle system of Custom Robo

The player moves around through various scenes and settings, interacting with other characters to gain information or engage in combat. Once the player has started a battle with another character, the scene changes to show the holoseum, or arena, in which the robots will be fighting. At the start of a battle, the player changes the direction of a robo cannon that launches the robot into the holoseum as a cube. In order to open the robo, the player must quickly press buttons and directions on the control stick. Depending on which side the cube lands on, the player may have more or less difficulty opening their robo. Once the robots have been launched onto the arena, they must fight using a variety of different weapons. The robot's arsenal includes guns, bombs, pods, and the ability to rocket punch. The robot also has a jetpack which allows for dashing to avoid enemy attacks. During battle, the endurance bar will decrease for each action performed. Once the bar runs out, the robot will become downed and unable to move. Once the robot recovers, it enters rebirth mode and will experience a brief period of invincibility. In order to win the battle, the player must reduce the opponent's health from 1000 to zero. If the player wins a battle, they will usually receive a new robot part from their opponent, allowing for customization. Rather than receiving the parts directly, the player usually must go to one of several parts machines to pick up the new part. The goal of the story mode is to defeat all of the other Robos and collect all of the parts. Any part that the player collects in story mode can then be used in versus mode to customize robot and battle against friends. Others can bring their own Custom Robos to battle on Nintendo 64 using a Nintendo 64 Memory Pack.

== Plot ==
The player receives a Custom Robo called Ray on their birthday, which inspires them to find opponents to battle in order to collect as many parts as possible and become a Custom Robo Master. Winning battles rewards the player with money and custom robo parts.

== Development ==
Custom Robo is targeted at young boys in Japan who enjoy playing with action figures and toy models. Noise, the developers of the game, said that their inspiration was the childhood fantasy of being able to become the action figure and play out battles. From this idea, the Custom Robos within the game were designed to be similar to real life Japanese model toys, with interchangeable parts and bodies able to move and pose with a limited degree of rotation.

== Reception and sales ==
Reception

Review scores
Publication	Score
Famitsu	32 of 40
GameSpot	8.1 of 10
IGN	8.8 of 10

Custom Robo sold 35,579 copies during its first week of sale in Japan. The suggested retail price was 6,800 yen (about US$65).

In the reviews on Custom Robo from GameSpot and IGN they talked about many of the game's features. Both mentioned that it is easy to control and responds well, and IGN states that the game's drive for the player to adapt to controlling each new weapon adds to its value. Both reviewers made remarks about the odd graphic styles of the game, while GameSpot took particular notice of the music. GameSpot reviewer James Mielke said that it has "some of the coolest, clanky big-robot sound effects ever heard in a game", but described the soundtrack as "often sounding completely out of place".
