= Noise (video game company) =

Japanese video game development company

NOISE Inc.
- Native name: 株式会社ノイズ
- Type: Private
- Industry: Video games
- Founded: September 2, 1996 (Japan); May 10, 2004 (United States)
- Headquarters: Nishigotanda, Shinagawa, Tokyo, Japan
- Key people: Kouji Kenjou (watch designer)
- Products: Games for Nintendo video game consoles
- Number of employees: 26 (as of March 2019)
- Website: http://www.noise-games.com/

NOISE Inc. (Japanese: 株式会社ノイズ) is a Japanese video game development company that works in partnership with Nintendo, developing games for the Custom Robo series.

== History ==
Noise was founded with a staff of 10 people on September 2, 1996 for the original purpose of developing games for PCs. A short time after, Noise became a part of Marigul Management, a company created by Nintendo and the Japanese telecommunications company Recruit for the purpose of enlisting smaller developers to make original games for the Nintendo 64.

The company’s first commercially published game, Custom Robo for the Nintendo 64, was released in Japan on December 9, 1999 and became a commercial success in Japan, prompting Nintendo to formally enter a publishing agreement with Noise. In 2006, Custom Robo was released in China for the iQue Player, making it the only Custom Robo title ever to be released there.

Its second released title was Custom Robo V2, which was released on November 10, 2000 and was also met with commercial success in Japan. It released its first portable video game for the Game Boy Advance, Custom Robo GX, on July 26, 2002.

Despite the impressive sales of the previous games in the Custom Robo franchise, the series’s first localized appearance in North America is with Custom Robo: Battle Revolution for the GameCube, released in 2004.

The company's first online multiplayer game is Custom Robo Arena, for the Nintendo DS title. Its latest game, Custom Robo Arena was released in 2006, three years after Marigul was closed. In 2007, Custom Robo Arena was released in PAL regions, making it the first title of the series ever released in those regions, as well as being released in more regions than every other title of the series.

The company developed and released Go! Go! Cosmo Cops! for the Nintendo DS in 2009, only for PAL regions. It was published by Namco Bandai. A planned Japan release as Shutsugeki! Acroknights was later quietly canceled.

Korogashi Puzzle Katamari Damacy (Korogashi Pazuru Katamari Damashii (ころがしパズル塊魂)), a falling block puzzle video game, was developed by them and released by Namco Bandai for the Nintendo DSi's DSiWare digital download service. It is a spin-off of the Katamari series

Kenkenba for iOS and Android was developed by Noise and released on November 28, 2011.

It developed Gyrozetter: Wings of the Albatross with Square Enix and released it on the June 13, 2013 for the Nintendo 3DS.

== Games ==
=== Nintendo 64 ===
- Custom Robo (Japan and China only)
- Custom Robo V2 (Japan only) (Released on Japanese Wii VC service in 2008)

=== Game Boy Advance ===
- Custom Robo GX (Japan only)

=== GameCube ===
- Custom Robo Battle Revolution (Japan and North America only)

=== Nintendo DS ===
- Custom Robo Arena
- Go! Go! Cosmo Cops! (Europe only)
- Korogashi Puzzle Katamari Damacy (DSiWare Japan Only)

=== Nintendo 3DS ===
- Gyrozetter: Wings Of The Albatross
- Kumamon*Bomber Puzzle de Kumamon taisou

=== iOS ===
- Kenkenpa
- Hoshi no Dragon Quest

=== Android ===
- Hoshi no Dragon Quest
