= Centipede: Infestation =

2011 video game

- Wii box art
- Developer: WayForward Technologies
- Publisher: Atari, Inc.
- Director: Armando Soto
- Producer: Robb Alvey
- Designers: Armando Soto; Barrett Velia; Steven Kitzes
- Programmer: Ian Flood
- Artists: Rob Buchanan; Chris Drysdale; Tom Wilson
- Writer: Adam Tierney
- Composer: Jake Kaufman
- Series: Centipede
- Platforms: Nintendo 3DS, Wii
- Release: Wii: NA: October 25, 2011; Nintendo 3DS: NA: November 1, 2011
- Genre: Run and gun
- Modes: Single-player, multiplayer

Centipede: Infestation is a run and gun video game developed by WayForward Technologies and published by Atari, Inc. for the Wii and Nintendo 3DS. It is a re-imagining of the Centipede video game franchise. The game was also going to be released in Europe and was even rated by PEGI but it was canceled.

== Plot ==
In a post-apocalyptic world where most of the Earth has been turned into desert wasteland inhabited by giant mutated bugs and humanity has been reduced to small cities and colonies due to the explosion of a bomb, a young man who calls himself Max the Bug Slayer wanders the wasteland constantly fighting and shooting the bugs for fun, until one day he stumbles across a garden being taken care by a young woman named Maisy Chambers. Max offers himself to follow and protect Maisy until they get to her home, and thus they start travelling together across a series of environments such as a desert, an abandoned city, a swamp and various caves, all taken over by giant bugs. Meanwhile, they start to reveal a bit of their past to each other: Max lived with his father and brother until the bomb dropped and both died, leaving him alone in the wasteland; Maisy and her mother had a gardening business together, until her mother disappeared while looking for soils in the wasteland, also leaving Maisy alone.

While in the caves, they find a locket that belonged to Maisy's mother, next to the lair of an Alpha Centipede, who Max calls Soot. Max explains he found Soot when it was small, and it was his best, and only, friend, until Soot grew larger and more aggressive, forcing Max to leave it behind in fear of getting himself hurt. Maisy says that the locket had a picture of herself in it but it has been taken out, so they go to Soot's cave in search of her mother and Max and Soot go into battle. Soot then tries to attack Maisy, and Max is sadly forced to shoot and kill it. Not having found her mother, Max and Maisy then embrace together as the soil grows grass and flowers from the nutrients in Soot's blood.

In a post-credits scene, a mysterious woman, whose face is never shown, holds a picture of a young Maisy in her hand.

== Gameplay ==
Centipede: Infestation is set in a post-apocalyptic world, and is played from a top-down perspective. Gameplay is a mix between run-and-gun action and tower defense. The player's goal is to fight off giant bugs while seeking to use special seeds to bring plant life back to the world. Players control a character named Max as well as a secondary character named Maisy who possesses a collection of special needs. She is often in need of rescue. The game has co-op gameplay and a wide variety of weapons and stages. The co-op part of the game features a selection of characters to choose from and it is much easier to get through the game with a friend.

Similar to the Wii version of the omnidirectional shoot 'em up Geometry Wars: Galaxies, the Wii version of the game supports two control schemes, one using the Wii Remote and the Nunchuk and another that uses the Classic Controller. The former assigns movement to the Nunchuk's analog stick, while using the Wii Remote's infrared pointer to determine which way he/she fires his/her weapon (for example, pointing the Wii Remote to the right side of the screen will cause the character to aim eastward). For the Classic Controller scheme, the player shoots by pushing the Right Stick in one of eight possible directions in which he/she wishes to fire. This eight-way firing system is also used in the Nintendo 3DS version, which implements it with the face buttons while allowing diagonal shots to be executed by holding two neighboring buttons. This version also utilizes the touch screen to quickly activate or change power-ups.
