= Go! Go! Cosmo Cops! =

2009 video game

- Developer: Noise
- Publisher: Namco Bandai Games (Note: Released under the Namco brand)
- Designer: Teruhiko Imaizumi
- Platform: Nintendo DS
- Release: 2009
- Genre: Platform
- Modes: Single player, multiplayer

Go! Go! Cosmo Cops! is a 2009 platform video game developed by Noise and published by Namco Bandai Games for the Nintendo DS in Europe. The game was set to be released in Japan as Shutsugeki! Acroknights (出撃！アクロナイツ "Sortie! Acroknights"), but was cancelled towards the end of production.
