= Nintendo data leak =

Online leak of video game development data

- Date: March 2018; Public release: May 31, 2018; Mar 19, 2020 – Sep 18, 2022
- Also known as: Nintendo Gigaleak
- Type: Data breach
- Target: Nintendo Co., Ltd.
- Suspects: Zammis Clark

The Nintendo data leak, also known as the Nintendo Gigaleak, is a series of leaks of data from the Japanese video game company Nintendo on the anonymous imageboard website 4chan. The leak started in March 2018, but became most prominent in 2020. Ten main sets of data leaked on 4chan, ranging from game and console source code to internal documentation and development tools. The name "Gigaleak" mainly refers to the second leak on July 24, 2020, which was 3 gigabytes in size. The leaks are believed to have come from companies contracted by Nintendo in the design of these consoles, and/or from individuals previously convicted of intrusion into Nintendo systems. An earlier, much smaller leak had also occurred in 2018 which contained the Nintendo Space World 1997 demos for Pokémon Gold and Silver. A second large-scale leak around October 2024 named the Teraleak reportedly included the source code for Pokémon Legends: Z-A, Pokémon Winds and Waves, and other assets for various Pokémon games. The Teraleak leaked over 1 terabyte of Pokémon info from Game Freak.

The leaks are infamous for the sheer size and the amount of internal material leaked; video game journalists have described the magnitude of the leaks as unprecedented, and suggested that they might have significant effects for emulation and preservationists, in addition to the legal questions posed by the leak. In June 2022, Nintendo acknowledged the leaks whilst assuring an increase to their overall security.

== Background ==
Nintendo is a Japanese video game developer and publisher that produces both software and hardware. Its hardware products include the handheld Game Boy and Nintendo DS families and home consoles such as the Nintendo Entertainment System (NES), Super NES, Nintendo 64 (N64), GameCube, and Wii. Software Nintendo produces includes popular franchises such as Mario, The Legend of Zelda, and Pokémon. Ethan Gach of Kotaku described Nintendo as "notoriously secretive" about development.

Nintendo is aggressive in ensuring its intellectual property in both hardware and software is protected. In a notable case, Nintendo, with the assistance of the US Federal Bureau of Investigation, sought enforcement action against Ryan Hernandez, an American hacker who infiltrated Nintendo's internal database to leak plans of what games and hardware Nintendo planned to announce for upcoming shows like the Electronic Entertainment Expo. In January 2020, Hernandez pled guilty to stealing the information from Nintendo.

== Leaks ==
=== "Gigaleak" (2018–2021) ===
Beginning in March 2018, information began to spread about a trove of stolen data from Nintendo's servers being leaked by hackers via the anonymous imageboard website 4chan. The leaks began with smaller releases, such as iQue Player ROMs and early Pokémon designs. The leaks began to gain significant traction in early May 2020, when source code for Nintendo's consoles appeared online. Because the leaked material included specifications related to the Wii, the company BroadOn, which Nintendo had contracted to help design the console, was identified as one potential source of the leaks. Another possible source was Zammis Clark, a British Malwarebytes employee and hacker, who in 2019 pleaded guilty to hacking charges and received a suspended sentence of 15 months for infiltrating Microsoft and Nintendo's servers between March and May 2018. According to reporting by journalist Jeremy Kirk of Bank Info Security, Clark sent the data he stole to several of his acquaintances, who subsequently began leaking the information on 4chan. According to Kirk, Nintendo likely knew the material would eventually be leaked. Further evidence to support the source being Clark can be found in the file modification dates of some released files, dated to March and May 2018, the same timeframe Clark allegedly had access.

In late July 2020, a second set of leaked data several gigabytes in size was released. Journalists and Nintendo fans dubbed this leak the "Gigaleak". The leak comprised information about the Super Nintendo Entertainment System and Nintendo 64 consoles and their games, including prototypes and data related to Star Fox and Star Fox 2, whose veracity was confirmed by Nintendo programmer Dylan Cuthbert. The leak also contained personal files of the developers, leading to concerns about privacy depending on how the information was shared. Hacktivist maia arson crimew was credited for the leak by Bleeping Computer, but told Tom's Guide that said leak did not originate with her.

In the first week of September 2020, a third, smaller set of information was leaked on 4chan. The leaks consisted of documents for two unreleased GameCube models. The first model appeared to be a hybrid console version of the GameCube similar to the Nintendo Switch, fitted with a built-in display and able to connect to a TV via a docking station. A backup of the Wii's hardware repository (codenamed "Tako", later "Vegas" by ATi), dated May 23, 2006, was also leaked. This repository contained a block diagram for a portable version of the Wii, Verilog files for near-final versions of the Wii components, and a 2003 ATI proposal for a console that would natively render games at HD video resolutions similar to the Xbox 360 and PlayStation 3, and include slots for both SD and memory cards. This proposed console was tentatively scheduled for a Christmas 2005 release.

A fourth set of information was leaked in 4chan on the second week of September 2020 (dubbed as "Gigaleak 3"). This set contains the internal documents for Wii Sports and Wii Sports Resort, source code to the Nintendo DSi boot ROM and some DSi apps, and a Game Boy and Game Boy Color ROM lot which contains released and unreleased games for the Game Boy and Game Boy Color along with their prototype and unreleased localized versions. One such game is the cancelled Pokémon Picross for Game Boy Color which, prior to the leak, was only previously seen in Japanese gaming magazines in 1999.

A fifth set of information was leaked in 4chan on September 30, 2020. This set contains the debug and demo ROMs for Pokémon Ranger, Pokémon Mystery Dungeon: Blue Rescue Team and Red Rescue Team and Pokémon FireRed and LeafGreen, internal tools for the Nintendo 3DS, and a Famicom Disk System ROM lot containing released and unreleased games. One of which was an unreleased port of Balloon Fight for the Famicom Disk System which had never been officially announced by Nintendo during the Famicom Disk System's lifespan.

Multiple sets were leaked in October 2020. The sixth set of information was leaked on October 17, 2020, containing the Git repository for Pokémon Sun and Moon and its updated rereleases, previously unseen Wii software used by Nintendo during manufacturing and repair, multiple versions of the Wii's internal operating system, as well as a pre-release version of the Wii system menu. The seventh set of information was leaked on October 21, 2020, containing two password-protected zip files later found to contain two debug builds of Pokémon Sword dated March 2018 and December 2017, respectively. The builds appear to have been based on Pokémon: Let's Go, Pikachu! and Let's Go, Eevee!, with related assets found within the builds. The eighth set of information was leaked on October 22, 2020, containing another two split password-protected zip files which were later found to be a May 2018 debug build of Pokémon Sword.

A ninth set of data was leaked in December 2020, which was primarily focused on early prototype designs of the Nintendo Switch and a prerelease SDK for the unit. Although the Nintendo Switch name had been finalized by 2014, this early design was closer in power to the 3DS, had a circular display, and connected to televisions through a wireless connection as opposed to a docking station. The leak also contained information on Nintendo's surveillance of and attempts to hire one Belgian hacker who was active in the 3DS homebrew scene. Alongside this, the source code for the Switch boot ROM was leaked, including both hardware revisions.

A tenth set of data was leaked in July 2021, containing source code for the Wii Service program, debug and prototype builds of Pokémon X and Y, Pokémon Emerald, Pokémon Diamond and Pearl, Pokémon: Let's Go Eevee!, the full development repository for the cancelled iQue Box (a GameCube-based successor to the iQue and related GameCube files), a personal email backup from a manager of Nintendo SPD from 2002 to 2006, and documents for systems like the Wii and the Nintendo Switch's Game Card reader, including early designs of the Wii Remote. Early images featuring enemies, bosses, NPCs, power-ups, and objects in New Super Mario Bros. were also leaked. These early screenshots include an early Bob-omb that is looking at Mario, and a Balloon Boo with a different mouth.

=== "Teraleak" (2024–2025) ===
In October 2024, over three years after the last outpour, an eleventh batch of data was leaked, stated by the leaker to be as a result of a separate hack, this time focusing on assets from Game Freak relevant to the Pokémon franchise. Game Freak confirmed the leak's legitimacy shortly afterwards, stating that their offices were breached the preceding August due to "unauthorized access to our servers by a third party." The leak, colloquially referred to as the "Teraleak" in reference to the prior "Gigaleak", included material such as source code, concept art, placeholder assets, extensive writeups on the series' lore, and company meetings regarding current and prospective multimedia adaptations. The leaked material additionally included alleged codenames for future Pokémon titles, such as Pokémon Legends ZA and Pokémon Winds and Waves, and the planned successor to the Nintendo Switch (which was later revealed as the Nintendo Switch 2), as well as the personal information of multiple Game Freak staffers.

== Data ==
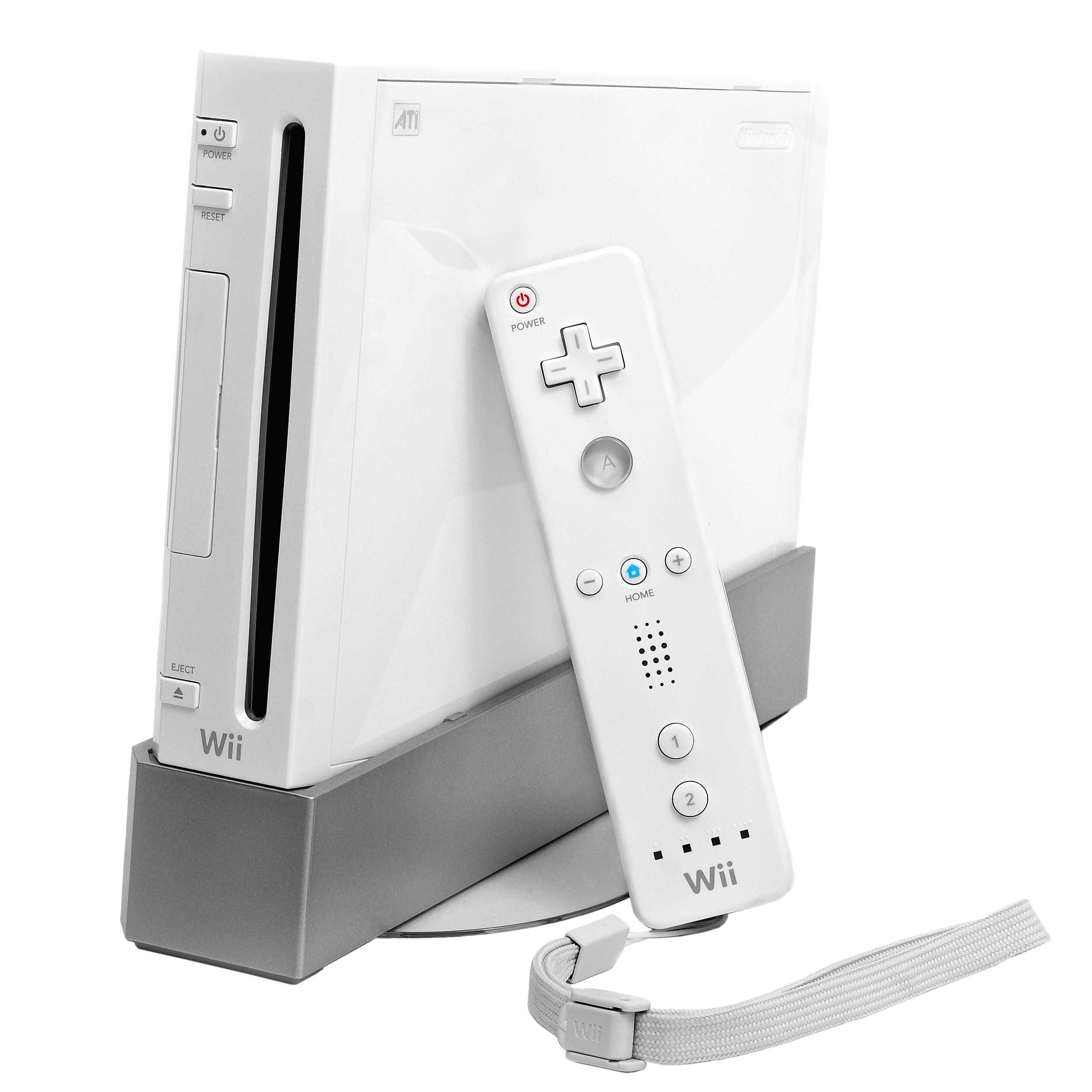
The leaks included source code related to a number of Nintendo consoles, such as the Wii (pictured).

The Gigaleak data, released as of May 4, 2020, amounted to an estimated three gigabytes from a drive reported to be two terabytes in size. The oldest material dates to the late 1980s. The leaks include (but are not limited to):

- Source code related to the N64, GameCube, and Wii consoles.
- Development repositories for the Game Boy Color Boot ROM and Game Boy Advance BIOS.
- N64 tech demos that test the system's hardware.
- A development repository for the canceled NetCard peripheral for the Game Boy Advance.
- Debugging material, prototypes, source code, and early designs for the Pokémon video games, dating back to the Game Boy installments.
- A concept for an online MMO Pokémon game, proposed by iQue and based on FireRed and LeafGreen.
- An official Game Boy emulator.
- A development repository for the "Ensata" Nintendo DS emulator.
- Raw graphics to many SNES and Game Boy games.
- Unreleased games for the NES, Famicom Disk System, Game Boy, and Game Boy Color.

=== Games with source code or assets leaked ===
==== Super NES ====
- BS Zelda no Densetsu
- F-Zero
- The Legend of Zelda: A Link to the Past
- Pilotwings
- SimCity
- Star Fox
- Star Fox 2
- Super Mario All-Stars
- Super Mario Kart
- Super Mario World
- Stunt Race FX
- Yoshi's Cookie
- Yoshi's Island
- Yoshi's Safari

==== Nintendo 64 ====
- 1080° Snowboarding
- Animal Crossing
- Dr. Mario 64
- F-Zero X
- NBA Courtside 2: Featuring Kobe Bryant
- The Legend of Zelda: Ocarina of Time
- The Legend of Zelda: Majora's Mask
- Mario Kart 64
- Star Fox 64
- Super Mario 64
- Wave Race 64
- Yoshi's Story

==== Game Boy and Game Boy Color ====
- Hamtaro: Ham-Hams Unite!
- Pokémon Red and Blue
- Pokémon Yellow
- Pokémon Gold and Silver
- Pokémon Crystal
- The Legend of Zelda: Link's Awakening DX

==== Game Boy Advance ====
- Advance Wars
- F-Zero: GP Legend
- F-Zero: Maximum Velocity
- Mario Kart: Super Circuit
- Pokémon FireRed and LeafGreen
- Pokémon Ruby and Sapphire
- Pokémon Emerald
- Super Mario Advance
- Wario Land 4

==== Nintendo DS ====
- New Super Mario Bros.
- Pokémon Diamond and Pearl
- Pokémon Platinum
- Pokémon HeartGold and SoulSilver
- Pokémon Black and White
- Pokémon Black 2 and White 2

==== Nintendo 3DS ====
- Pokémon X and Y
- Pokémon Sun and Moon
- Pokémon Ultra Sun and Ultra Moon

==== Nintendo Switch ====
- Pokémon: Let's Go, Pikachu! and Let's Go, Eevee!
- Pokémon Sword and Shield
- Pokémon Legends: Arceus
- Pokémon Scarlet and Violet
- Pokémon Legends: Z-A

==== Nintendo Switch 2 ====
- Pokémon Winds and Waves

==== System firmware ====
- Nintendo 64
- Game Boy Color
- GameCube
- iQue Box (cancelled)
- Game Boy Advance
- iQue Player
- iQue NetCard (cancelled)
- Nintendo DS
- Wii
- Nintendo DSi
- Nintendo 3DS
- Wii U
- Nintendo Switch

=== Prototypes and development materials ===
In addition to source code, the July 2020 leak included a number of video game prototypes, as well as cut content. A prototype of Yoshi's Island that does not feature Yoshi as the protagonist was uncovered; its title, Super Donkey, suggests it may have been considered as a new Donkey Kong game before being repurposed for Yoshi. Early sprites from various games, including Pilotwings when it was known as Dragonfly, were also discovered.

Among the most notable revelations was the discovery of an official 3D model of Luigi for Super Mario 64, corroborating developer interviewers at the time of the game's release that they had intended to include Luigi as a second co-operative character but had to cut the feature. This validated a longstanding desire in the Mario fanbase to see Luigi in the game, known as "L is real". Another major discovery was level maps intended for an unreleased 64DD expansion pack for The Legend of Zelda: Ocarina of Time. These various Zelda assets were assembled by fans to recreate a dungeon that was originally only viewable in pre-release screenshots.

The leaks included the software that was necessary to run the WorkBoy, a canceled Game Boy accessory that would have added personal digital assistant features to the handheld. Only two prototypes of the WorkBoy were known to exist, and the software from the leak was used to verify the operation of one of the WorkBoys. In 2021, fans used the Super Mario Advance source code to track down the samples used to compose Super Mario World's soundtrack and recreated the music as it would have sounded before being compressed to fit the SNES's limitations.

== Commentary ==
Video game journalists noted the magnitude of the leaks and labeled them significant and unprecedented. Journalist Alex Donaldson described the leak as "of biblical, rarely heard of proportions", while Lucas White of Siliconera wrote that the leak "could be one of the biggest leaks in the medium's history."

Because the source code of various Nintendo consoles was leaked, journalists have noted the various after-effects the leak might have. Gach wrote that the leaked information "would be of great interest to emulation enthusiasts, data miners, and anyone curious about" Nintendo's history. The information could be used to enhance the accuracy of Nintendo console emulators or create clone systems that function identically to the original hardware. Such actions, however, would be illegal, and developers who commit them could face prosecution from Nintendo. For instance, the developers of Dolphin, a GameCube and Wii emulator, stated that using any of the leaked source code would lead to the Dolphin project's immediate shutdown. Nonetheless, the financial effects of the leak on Nintendo are expected to be minimal, as the leaked material is over a decade old.

White and Sam Chandler of Shacknews suggested that the leaks would be important for video game preservation efforts. Some preservationists that have looked at the data commented on the meticulousness with which Nintendo saved its past work, which they wished other video game companies would emulate, as it would greatly assist preservation efforts. However, these preservationists raised moral and ethical questions about whether they could use the data from the 2020 leaks in a legal manner without knowing their source and legitimacy. Andrew Webster of The Verge found this situation similar to the 2014 Sony Pictures hack, in which "all kinds of salacious internal details" about Sony Pictures were illegally released.

During an annual shareholder meeting in June 2022, Nintendo was asked about the leaks as well as Chinese video game company iQue relating to rumours they had been a source for the information leaks. In response, Nintendo President Shuntaro Furukawa reassured that they were working with experts to deal with information leaks by stating they had "introduced information security management", as well as acknowledging the company would continue to advance into the Chinese market with help from Tencent. Following the meeting, Nintendo published a statement further addressing their security and further detailed information security management.

== See also ==
- 2022 Grand Theft Auto VI development leak
- Internet leak § Source code leaks
  - Windows XP Service Pack 1 source code leak
  - Windows Server 2003 source code leak
- List of commercial video games with available source code
- Pokémon Gold and Silver leak
