= Custom Robo =

- Logo since 2004
- Genres: Action role-playing, Fighting game
- Developer: Noise
- Publisher: Nintendo
- Platforms: Nintendo 64; Game Boy Advance; GameCube; Nintendo DS
- First release: Custom Robo; December 8, 1999
- Latest release: Custom Robo Arena; October 19, 2006

Custom Robo (Note: Japanese: カスタムロボ, Hepburn: Kasutamu Robo) is an action role-playing video game series developed by Noise and published by Nintendo.

The series spans five games released on the Nintendo 64, Game Boy Advance, GameCube, and Nintendo DS. Only the two most recent titles have seen a release outside of Japan.

== Gameplay ==
Custom Robo is an arena fighting game that makes use of a mix and match gear loadout system similar to games such as Robotrek or Front Mission, but with frantic action battles in confined 3D arenas (2D arenas in Custom Robo GX), similar to Virtual On.

In Custom Robo, the object is to reduce the opponent's hit points from 1000 to 0 by mixing together different Robos (bodies), guns, bombs and pods, usually by pressuring opponents into taking damage through various trap tactics allowed by a Robo's customized loadout. Custom Robos are arranged in groups that are similar to their abilities. The endurance bar is located above the player's hitbox; once it runs out, the Custom Robo gets "downed" which means that it stays fallen for a couple seconds. After the Robo gets up, it goes into "rebirth" mode, a temporary state of invincibility lasting 3 seconds. Should the player repeatedly lose the same battle, the game will offer the option of reducing the opponent's initial health, in order to make the battle easier. If players continue to lose several times, the degree of handicap offered increases up to 75%, giving the opponent a starting HP of 250, rather than 1000.

In each game's story mode, contextualized as a role-playing game, players slip into the role of a nameable protagonist just beginning to learn about Custom Robo. In each game, the first Robo players obtain is always the latest model of the Ray series. The goal for players is to improve their skills and collect different Custom Robo body kits and gear in order to defeat everyone, including champion Custom Robo users. The main objective of the game is to finish the storyline by collecting every Custom Robo and battle part, while winning every battle that moves players along through the story arc.

== International release ==
The first three Custom Robo series were exclusive to Japan. In 2001, however, Nintendo released Super Smash Bros. Melee, a fighting game containing characters from throughout the company's history, worldwide. In the title's trophy room, three custom robos from Custom Robo V2 appeared as trophies: Ray Mk II, Bayonette, and Annie.

Stated by several issues of Nintendo Power, an international release of Custom Robo GX, the third title in the series, was planned but later canceled. The fourth title in the series, Custom Robo: Battle Revolution, would later be released in North America in 2004, becoming the first title in the series to be released outside of Japan. The fifth title of the series, Custom Robo Arena, would become the first and only Custom Robo title released globally.

== Games ==
The following is a list of games released in the series:

Games predating Battle Revolution were released only in Japan (except the first one, which was also released in China for the iQue Player). Due to this, there are no official titles for North American or European releases of these games. Such a title may be given if Nintendo divisions outside Japan elects to localize any of these games to their regions.

| Title | Platform(s) | Release year(s) | Notes |
|---|---|---|---|
| Custom Robo (Note: Japanese: カスタムロボ) | Nintendo 64, iQue Player | Japan: 1999; China: 2006 | The first title of the Custom Robo series. It is also the first and only title of the series released for the iQue Player in China. |
| Custom Robo V2 (Note: Japanese: カスタムロボV２) | Nintendo 64, Wii Virtual Console, Wii U Virtual Console | Japan: 2000, 2008, 2016 | Second and last Custom Robo title developed for the Nintendo 64. It is also the first title of the series to allow up to four players to play, instead of up to two players. It was released on the Wii Virtual Console in Japan in February 2008 and the Wii U Virtual Console in June 2016. |
| Custom Robo GX (Note: Japanese: カスタムロボGX) | Game Boy Advance | Japan: 2002 | The first Custom Robo title to appear on a Nintendo handheld. It is also the first and only Custom Robo rendered in two-dimensional (2D) graphics instead of three-dimensional (3D) graphics for Custom Robo battles. |
| Custom Robo (Note: Known in Japan as カスタムロボ バトルレボリューション (lit. Custom Robo: Battle Revolution).) | GameCube | Japan and North America: 2004 | The first Custom Robo title released in North America. It is also the first to incorporate full motion video. |
| Custom Robo Arena (Note: Known in Japan as 激闘!カスタムロボ (Gekitō! Custom Robo; lit. Rumble! Custom Robo).) | Nintendo DS | Japan: 2006; North America, Australia and Europe: 2007 | The first Custom Robo title to use Nintendo Wi-Fi Connection for playing multiplayer gameplay online. It is also the first and only Custom Robo title to be released in PAL regions. |

A sequel to Custom Robo GX was originally planned for release on the Game Boy Advance in late 2005, but later cancelled.
