= Robb Alvey =

American roller coaster reviewer and video game producer

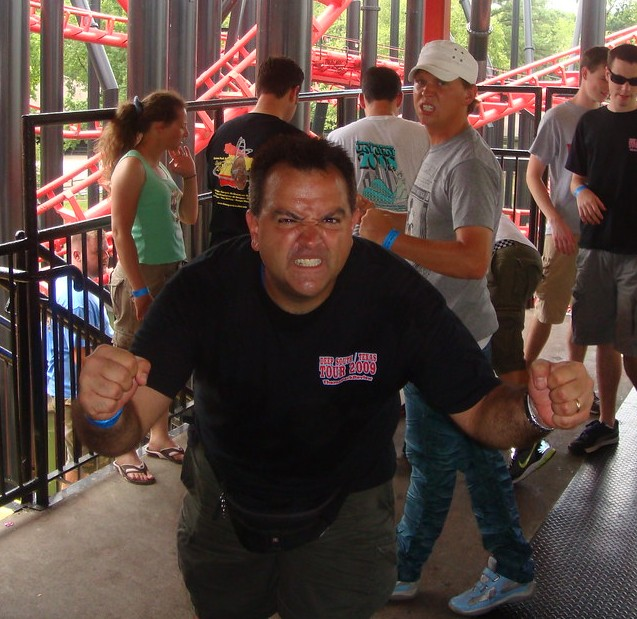
- Robb Alvey in 2019
- Born: Robert Lee; Southern California
- Occupation: Video game producer
- Known for: Theme Park Review

Robb Alvey (born Robert Lee) is an American roller coaster reviewer and video game producer. Alvey has ridden over 1400 coasters around the world, and has documented his travels and those of others on his website Theme Park Review. He has been featured on related documentaries for Discovery Channel, Travel Channel, and TLC.

== Career ==
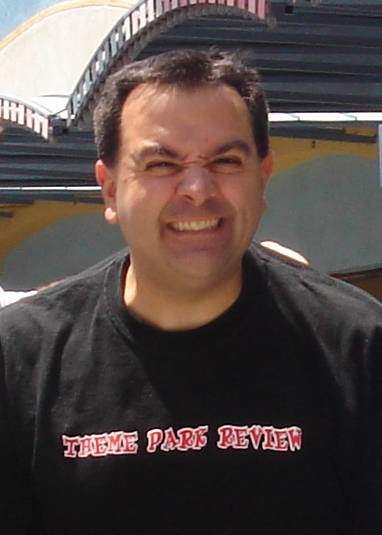
Robb Alvey in May 2008

Alvey is best known as a roller coaster reviewer and aficionado. His Theme Park Review website was started in 1996 and became a site for coaster videos, photos, forums, and information about theme parks and roller coasters. As of 2012, the website sees over 2 million visitors per year and has more than 35,000 registered members. After the popularity of his website increased, a number of people indicated they wished to be involved in his theme park tours, so he began selling tickets for fans to accompany him. These tours were organized by Alvey through his website and span multiple theme parks across the United States and internationally, such as the Middle America Tour in August 2010, where seventeen theme parks were attended over the course of fifteen days, and a 40-person world tour that included Aussie World in Australia. He is formerly a member of the American Coaster Enthusiasts organization.

He has also worked as a video game producer on a number of games including the remake A Boy and His Blob and Call of Duty: United Offensive. Companies he has worked with include MGM Interactive, WayForward Technologies, Take-Two Interactive, and Gray Matter Studios.

He has been featured in the television series Insane Coaster Wars as a roller coaster "expert".

He currently lives in Orlando, Florida.

== Filmography/games ==
Film/Game	Type	Year	Role
Insane Coaster Wars	TV series	2012	Self
Centipede: Infestation	Video game	2011	Producer
Thor: God of Thunder	Video game	2011	Producer
SpongeBob SquigglePants	Video game	2011	Producer
Batman: The Brave and the Bold – The Videogame	Video game	2010	Producer
Roller Coasters in the Raw: HD Volume 1	Movie	2010	Director/Producer/Editor
Barbie and the Three Musketeers	Video game	2009	Producer
Roller Coasters in the Raw: Volume 4	Movie	2009	Director/Producer/Editor
A Boy and His Blob	Video game	2009	Producer
Roller Coasters in the Raw: Volume 3	Movie	2009	Director/Producer/Editor
Roller Coasters in the Raw: Volume 2	Movie	2008	Director/Producer/Editor
Roller Coasters in the Raw: Volume 1	Movie	2007	Director/Producer/Editor
Transformers: The Game	Video game	2007	Producer
Call of Duty 3	Video game	2006	Consulting producer
The Movies	Video game	2005	Consulting producer
Call of Duty 2: Big Red One	Video game	2005	Producer
Call of Duty: United Offensive	Video game	2004	Executive producer
Mall Tycoon	Video game	2002	Executive producer
Stronghold	Video game	2001	Executive producer
Jetfighter IV: Fortress America	Video game	2000	Executive producer
Sheep	Video game	2000	Executive producer
Tomorrow Never Dies	Video game	1999	Executive producer
WarGames: Defcon 1	Video game	1998	Director/Executive producer
Spot Goes to Hollywood	Video game	1995	Producer
The Jungle Book	Video game	1994	Game designer/Producer
The Lion King	Video game	1994	Production coordinator
The 7th Guest	Video game	1993	Producer
Disney's Aladdin	Video game	1993	Producer
Dune II	Video game	1992	Production coordinator
