= Zammis Clark =

Computer security specialist and suspected hacker (born 1994)

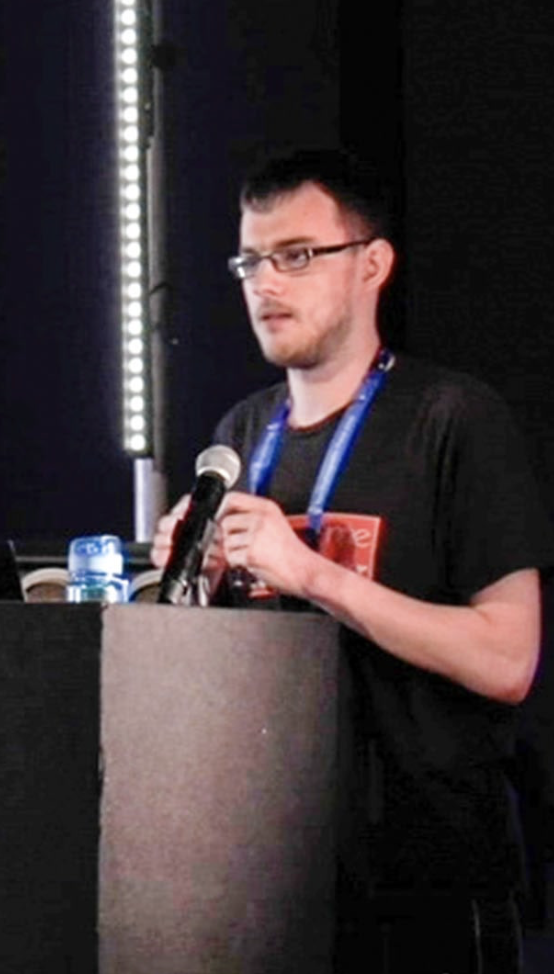
- Clark in 2022
- Born: 1994 (age 31–32); United Kingdom
- Other names: wack0; Slipstream; Raylee/Rairii
- Known for: Suspected of various data leaks

Zammis Clark (born 1994), also known as wack0, Slipstream or Raylee/Rairii, is a British computer security specialist and former employee of Malwarebytes. Clark is suspected to have hacked numerous large entities, including VTech, Nintendo, Microsoft, and North Korea, leaking Version 3.0 of its Red Star Operating System.

In 2019, Clark pleaded guilty to charges relating to hacking and data breaches, but did not receive a custodial sentence due to mental health issues, instead receiving a suspended sentence lasting 15 months for infiltrating Microsoft and Nintendo's servers between March and May 2018.

== Hacking career ==
=== North Korea OS ===
In January 2015, Clark publicized the Red Star Operating System, which was the operating system of North Korea, one of the most secretive countries in the world. In 2013, the first images of the OS were publicized by former Google employee Will Scott, but Clark was the first to release the system in full. Research on the OS revealed it was designed to suppress all information available to users, instead opting for a state-sponsored system with only selectively available websites.

== See also ==
- Nintendo data leak
