= Rovio =

Rovio may refer to:

- Kustaa Rovio, a Finnish politician from the first half of the 20th century
- Rovio Entertainment, a Finnish video game company best known for being the creator of Angry Birds
- Rovio Animation, an animation division of Rovio Entertainment
- Rovio (robot), a Wi-Fi enabled robot manufactured by Hong Kong company WowWee
- Rovio (Ticino), a municipality in the Swiss canton of Ticino

== See also ==
- Roxio, an American software company
