= Custom Robo (2004 video game) =

2004 video game

- North American cover art
- Developers: Noise; Studiofake
- Publisher: Nintendo
- Director: Keiji Okayasu
- Producers: Koji Kenjo; Shigeru Miyamoto
- Designer: Takayoshi Masuko
- Writer: Keiji Okayasu
- Composer: Takayuki Nakamura
- Series: Custom Robo
- Platform: GameCube
- Release: JP: March 4, 2004; NA: May 10, 2004
- Genre: Action role-playing
- Modes: Single-player, multiplayer

Custom Robo, known in Japan as Custom Robo: Battle Revolution, (Note: Japanese: カスタムロボ バトルレボリューション, Hepburn: Kasutamu Robo Batoru Reboryūshon) is an action role-playing video game developed by Noise and Studiofake and published by Nintendo for the GameCube. It is the fourth title of the Custom Robo series, and the first to be released outside Japan.

As with previous games in the series, it centers on miniature robots, which the player can select various different parts for, then battle other robots with.

Custom Robo received mixed reviews from critics upon release. It was followed by Custom Robo Arena on the Nintendo DS in 2006.

== Gameplay ==
The Battle System of Custom Robo

Custom Robo revolves around the use of the eponymous miniature robots in battles which take place in a virtual arena called a Holosseum. The majority of the story takes place in a campaign-like mode titled "A New Journey". After this mode is completed, the player may choose to go through the story again or select a new mode consisting of a series of tournaments called "The Grand Battle".

Outside of battles, the player controls a human character called a commander, traversing the game world and interacting with NPCs. Battles occur at specific points in the story, at which point the game transitions to a view within the Holosseum. Holosseums come in a variety of sizes and layouts, and some feature environmental hazards such as ice or lava.

Before battling begins, players customize their robos from 5 types of parts: the chassis (the robo itself), the gun (right hand), the bomb (left hand), the pod (backpack), and the legs (attachments to your legs and feet). The chassis are arranged in groups that designate the model, which affects its traits. In addition, there are 3 types of the same model.

Battles begin with robo being launched out of a Robocannon, which is controlled with the Control Stick. Robos are shot from the Cannon in the form of cubes; there are six sides numbered 1 to 6, which designate how long the player's robo has before transforming. Players can speed up the process up by pressing any button repeatedly. The first robo to transform gets to attack first - an attack brings them to transform immediately. There are two views in battle: Normal view is the view that allows the player to see both the Custom Robos in an isometric view. First-person view allows to see from robo's point of view. Players can change views during a battle by pressing up on the C-stick after "A New Journey" is completed. The endurance bar is located above your hit points. Once it runs out, their robo gets "downed", which means that it becomes unresponsive for a couple seconds; they can speed up the process of recovering by repeatedly tapping the A button. After it gets up, it goes into "rebirth", where it briefly turns invincible for about 3 seconds. If the player repeatedly loses the same battle, the game offers the option of reducing the opponent's initial health. This goes up to the opponent losing 250 HP.

== Plot ==
The player-named main character, called "Hero" from here on, receives a watch as a birthday present from his father, who tells him to keep it safe before disappearing from his life. Years later, Hero suddenly receives a letter stating that his father has just died. In honor of his father's wishes for him to become a Robo Commander, Hero sets out to do so, despite knowing nothing about robos. He eventually manages to join up with a group of bounty hunters known as the "Steel Hearts", where he meets Ernest, Harry, and Marcia. Harry teaches Hero how to command robos and helps him receive his license, which allows Hero to battle with robos legally. After a few minor errands, Hero and company discover the self-guided Robo known as 'Rahu'. Later, after passing a test and obtaining a Class "S" license, Rahu's past is revealed and Hero finds out that Rahu is an invisible organic being who had accidentally been fused with a toy robot.

Before the time of the domed city, the world was attacked by a powerful entity, now known as Rahu. Eventually, Rahu came to possess a child's toy. This toy was very similar to a Robo. By popularizing Robo battling, the government gave the people a way to fight the entity. Rahu was soon damaged enough to be driven into dormancy for a long period of time, but has now awoken. Hero and the rest of the police force leave the safety of the dome to defeat Rahu again, along with the organization known as the Z-Syndicate, who are trying to control the entity for their own ends. After defeating the syndicate, Hero meets an old friend of his father's, and the brother of Marcia of the Steel Hearts, a spy named Sergei. He originally joined the Z Syndicate to stop Rahu, but was forced to work with Oboro, who wanted to control Rahu for his own means. Eliza and Isabella, two other members of the Z Syndicate, also wanted to control Rahu. Sergei showed Hero an old recording of his father's last message to him. In the recording, Hero's father explains that he left to form the Z-Syndicate in an attempt to inform the people of Rahu's impending attack. The other members soon lost sight of his vision and betrayed him in an attempt to the seize control of the Syndicate and Rahu. Hero, Harry, and Marcia eventually defeat Rahu, ensuring the world's safety - for a while.

== Reception ==
Reception

Aggregate score
Aggregator	Score
Metacritic	65/100

Review scores
Publication	Score
Edge	5/10
Electronic Gaming Monthly	6.83/10
Famitsu	30/40
Game Informer	5.75/10
GamePro	3/5
GameRevolution	C−
GameSpot	6.3/10
GameSpy	4/5
GameZone	7.5/10
IGN	6.5/10
Nintendo Power	3.8/5

The game received "mixed" reviews according to video game review aggregator website Metacritic. In Japan, Famitsu gave it a score of two sevens and two eights for a total of 30 out of 40. However, in retrospective reception the game has been heavily praised and is frequently featured in several "Best GameCube games" lists and countdowns.
