= A Boy and His Blob: Trouble on Blobolonia =

1989 NES video game

- North American box art
- Developer: Imagineering
- Publishers: NA: Absolute Entertainment; JP: Jaleco; EU: Nintendo
- Designers: David Crane; Garry Kitchen
- Programmers: David Crane; Rick Booth
- Artist: Jesse Kapili
- Composer: Mark Van Hecke
- Series: A Boy and His Blob
- Platform: Nintendo Entertainment System
- Release: NA: December 1989; JP: November 29, 1990; EU: 1991
- Genre: Puzzle-platform
- Mode: Single-player

A Boy and His Blob: Trouble on Blobolonia is a puzzle-platform game developed by Imagineering and published by Absolute Entertainment for the Nintendo Entertainment System (NES). The video game was released in North America in 1989, in Japan by Jaleco in 1990 and in Europe by Nintendo in 1991. A Boy and His Blob follows an unnamed male protagonist and his shapeshifting blob friend, Blobert, on their adventure to save the planet of Blobolonia from the clutches of an evil emperor.

A Boy and His Blob is a puzzle-platform game that puts the player in control of the boy; its gameplay revolves around feeding his blob companion different flavored jelly beans to alter its shape into various tools in order to overcome obstacles and traverse the game's world. A Boy and His Blob was designed and programmed by David Crane. Licensed by Nintendo in the summer of 1989, development began and was completed in an intense six-week period. Crane has described the game's overall concept of a boy accompanied by a morphing blob as unconventional and wanted to try his own hand at implementing useful tools for the player.

Critical reception for A Boy and His Blob has been mixed. Though most reviewers agreed the gameplay was original, some felt it was poorly executed. The game won the 1989 Consumer Electronics Show (CES) "Best of Show" and a 1990 Parents' Choice Award. A Boy and His Blob was followed by a sequel on the Game Boy titled The Rescue of Princess Blobette. After two failed attempts to bring the series to Nintendo's other handhelds over the years, a re-imagining of Trouble on Blobolonia was developed by WayForward Technologies and released by Majesco on the Wii in 2009. That same year, the original NES game was re-released on the Wii Virtual Console service in North America and PAL regions.

== Gameplay ==
The vanilla jelly bean transforms Blobert into a protective umbrella.

A Boy and His Blob is a puzzle-platform game. The plot involves a young boy and his alien blob friend, Blobert, on a quest to save the latter's home planet of Blobolonia, which has been taken over by an evil emperor who only allows his subjects a diet of sweets. The boy and Blobert must traverse the subways and caves beneath the Earth and gain the necessary items before traveling to Blobolonia and defeating the emperor. They must evade dangerous obstacles like falling rocks, stalactites, and stalagmites, as well as deadly snake enemies. A Boy and His Blob is not a side-scrolling game, but presents the player with a series of interconnected screens. The player-controlled boy is limited to running left or right. The player cannot jump or swim, and if the boy falls too long of a distance, he dies on impact.

Though the player directly controls the boy, Blobert is controlled by the computer AI. The player must rely on the shapeshifting blob to cross gaps, reach higher platforms, and overcome the obstacles and enemies. Blobert can change into several different tools when the player feeds him flavored jelly beans. A licorice jelly bean, for instance, will change Blobert into a ladder, while an apple jelly bean will turn him into a jack. Whistling at Blobert causes him to revert to his original shape and continue following the boy. The player is encouraged to experiment with the jelly beans and their effects to navigate the puzzling game world. Scattered throughout Earth's caverns are various treasures and diamonds that increase the player's score and can be used to purchase vitamins at a drugstore located within the game world. Vitamins can be used in conjunction with a special "VitaBlaster" gun, which is in turn used on Blobolonia to complete certain tasks. Also found on the map are extra jelly beans and peppermints, which increase the player's lives.

== Plot ==
The game focuses on a teenage-looking boy discovering a Blob whose name is Blobert and needs help freeing his planet Blobolonia from the clutches of the evil emperor. On their way, the teenage boy discovers that Blobert can shape-shift when he eats certain jellybeans. He and Blobert partner up and become friends to stop the evil emperor.

== Development ==
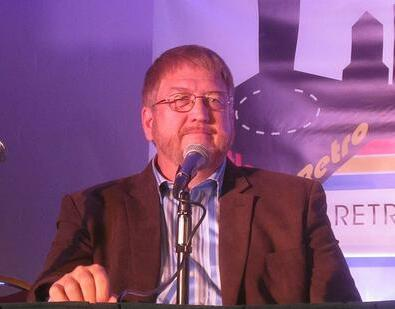
David Crane was the chief programmer and designer of A Boy and His Blob.

A Boy and His Blob: Trouble on Blobolonia was developed by Imagineering, the in-house developer of Absolute Entertainment. The game was chiefly designed and programmed by David Crane with help from his former Activision colleague Garry Kitchen. Kitchen was the president of the Activision spin-off company Absolute, which began self-publishing in 1988; Crane joined Kitchen at Absolute around the same time. Crane described the concept of a boy accompanied by a shapeshifting blob as "an off-the-wall idea". Crane stated that Blobert's design was heavily influenced by the characters Gloop and Gleep from the Hanna-Barbera cartoon The Herculoids. In terms of gameplay, Crane's goal was to advance the adventure genre as he had done with the Atari 2600 game Pitfall!. Since the release of the sequel Pitfall II: Lost Caverns, adventure games on the market had grown to include useful tools for players to collect and utilize in their environments, but Crane found displayed tool inventories "not very elegant" and decided to implement tools in a different way. After coming up with the game's premise, a wishlist of the blob's object transformations was written and brainstormed with artists, who then converted them into computer graphics. Transformations were chosen based on how they would appear on screen due to the NES's graphical resolution. According to Crane, objects such as the bridge and ladder were "a must", but many ideas were scrapped because their nature would not be immediately obvious to the player. Puzzles that could be solved using the objects were created after the various shapes were finalized.

A total of 14 jellybean flavors were implemented in the game. To ease the game's difficulty level, the flavors were named specifically as either puns or alliteration to help the player remember them. For instance, the punch-flavored jelly bean transforms Blobert into a hole, a play on the term "hole punch". A grape-flavored bean listed in the game's manual was only present in the version submitted to Nintendo. This flavor transformed the blob into a wall ("grape wall", a pun of Great Wall of China) which would repel enemies. A Boy and His Blob proved to be "one of the most played games at Nintendo" once it was submitted to the company. In this earlier version, the player character could potentially become separated from the blob, thus making it impossible to proceed. A senior management member of Nintendo viewed this as a bug, so Crane substituted the grape bean for a ketchup-flavored bean that would instead summon the blob (catch up) to the boy's location.

A Boy and His Blob was officially licensed by Nintendo in the summer of 1989. Though standard NES games took six to eight months to develop, Imagineering completed A Boy and His Blob in a mere six weeks. Crane himself rented a room in a flophouse near his office and put in several 16- to 20-hour days of the work on the project. After going without sleep for 48 hours in its last two days of earnest development, Crane flew to the CES in Chicago for trade demonstrations, then spent nights at his hotel fixing bugs. The game was released just prior to Christmas in 1989 as Absolute's first game on the NES. Crane recalled the development process for Absolute's early games to be enjoyable, but explained that "under the rule of Nintendo, the publishing side of the game business was really tough", emphasizing how frequently game publishers went out of business in those years. The team was originally in talks with a writer-producer of the Transformers animated features to simultaneously launch the A Boy and His Blob video game with a tie-in toy and a film, but the plans never came to fruition due to deadlines and difficulty in dividing production resources into three ways between a game, toy, and film. When A Boy and His Blob was released in Japan by Jaleco in November 1990, it was retitled Fushigi na Blobby: Blobania no Kiki (ふしぎなブロビー ブロバニアの危機; lit. "Mysterious Blobby: The Crisis of Blobania"), and the protagonist was completely redesigned as a younger boy.

== Reception ==
Reception

Review scores
Publication	Score
Dragon	5/5
Electronic Gaming Monthly	5/10, 6/10, 5/10, 6/10
Famitsu	6/10, 6/10, 8/10, 7/10
IGN	4.5/10
Joystick	86%
Mean Machines Sega	91%
Nintendo Life	6/10
Total!	55%

Critical reception for A Boy and His Blob: Trouble on Blobolonia has been mixed. Many reviews published during the game's original release positively regarded the game's premise of a boy advancing by using a blob companion as a tool-set. Staff for the magazines Mean Machines and Dragon and Edward J. Semrad of The Milwaukee Journal all remarked the game as having fun, challenging gameplay and being a creative and original idea. The two reviewers of Mean Machines gave praise to the graphical quality of A Boy and His Blob, commenting: "Some of the backdrops are digitized and superbly coloured. The boy moves smoothly [and] realistically and the Blob himself is a masterpiece of animation". Simrad, who labeled the game as an updated version of Crane's previous work Pitfall!, was not as impressed by the graphics, claiming that the programmer always preferred to use the available memory for the size of the maze.

The four reviewers of Electronic Gaming Monthly found A Boy and His Blob to be strictly average due to its few enemies and a lack of scrolling screens. Although they made similar, positive comments about its unique gameplay formula, one of the writers felt it "never fully realizes its potential". This opinion was echoed by Lucas M. Thomas of IGN, who gave a more negative review of the game: "While the idea behind A Boy and His Blob was certainly unique, even praiseworthy, the execution of the concept didn't exactly make for a very fun game". Thomas faulted the game's controls; its vast, empty environments; and a limited number of essential jelly beans to advance, leaving the player with "just the core gameplay gimmick of the blob's different transformations". 1UP.com contributor Jeremy Parish predicted that the game's potentially frustrating, trial-and-error mechanics could subside once the player is over the learning curve and masters the limited toolset and simple interface.

As reported by Stuart Hunt of Retro Gamer, "A Boy and His Blob proved to be a phenomenal success for Absolute Entertainment, going on to become one of the company's biggest hits and exceeding all the team's expectations". The game won "Best of Show" award for its debut at the 1989 CES. The advocacy group Parents' Choice Foundation awarded A Boy and His Blob with a Parents' Choice Award in 1990 for "portraying 'Positive human values', 'High quality software', 'Intelligent design', and the 'Ability to hold the player's interest'". Designer David Crane was particularly proud of the latter honor, which he appreciated both before and after becoming a parent himself.

== Legacy ==
Since the original release of the game, A Boy and His Blob: Trouble on Blobolonia has received scattered recognition from the media. In 2005, University of Houston newspaper columnist Jason Poland attributed the inspiration of the game's premise, in which a young boy befriends an outerspace being, to the central theme found in a slew of 1980s films including E.T. the Extra-Terrestrial and The Last Starfighter. The writer found this especially true for the former of the two features, in which the earthling protagonist supplies his alien cohort with candy. Poland explained that "although free from any Jelly Belly product placement, A Boy and His Blob encompasses plot devices from every '80s buddy sci-fi film and acts as an end cap to the entire film genre". The website GamesRadar noted A Boy and His Blob as a milestone in video games for having the first recognizable instance of an AI-controlled partner. Despite giving it such a low review score, IGN listed A Boy and His Blob as the 74th-best game on the NES, owing its inclusion to creative gameplay mechanics and a healthy mixture of action-adventure and platforming.

A sequel to A Boy and His Blob was released for the Game Boy under the name The Rescue of Princess Blobette. The game once again follows the title characters as they attempt to save a princess jailed within a castle tower.

Majesco bought the rights to A Boy and His Blob after Absolute's closure. A Game Boy Advance incarnation of the series titled A Boy and His Blob: Jelly's Cosmic Adventure was announced by Majesco in 2001, but was ultimately cancelled. Majesco announced another sequel in 2005 as being in development for the Nintendo DS by Skyworks Technologies, a company formed by Crane and Kitchen in 1995. The game's story was to take place six years after the conclusion of the NES release. It was to feature 3D models, between 15 and 20 differently colored jelly beans, 15 levels, and a DS touchscreen feature for managing a jelly bean inventory. However, Majesco's financial troubles delayed the game's release indefinitely. In 2022, an anonymous developer of this unreleased DS version, in concert with gaming preservation organization Gaming Alexandria and YouTube channel Did You Know Gaming?, released 2 builds of the game, one of which was the final build received by Majesco.

A Wii re-imagining of A Boy and His Blob: Trouble on Blobolonia simply titled A Boy and His Blob was developed by WayForward Technologies and published by Majesco in 2009. Crane was not involved in the new game's creation. That same year, A Boy and His Blob: Trouble on Blobolonia was re-released on the Wii Virtual Console service in both North America and PAL regions. Another new title in the series was listed at the Electronic Entertainment Expo in 2010 as being in development for the Nintendo 3DS. WayForward later issued a statement that the listing was a mistake and that no new A Boy and His Blob was in production. A high-definition port of A Boy and His Blob was released on Xbox One, PlayStation 4, PlayStation Vita, Microsoft Windows, OS X, and Linux on January 20, 2016. A PlayStation 3 version was made available on June 28 of the same year as a cross-purchase with the PS4 and Vita versions. Mobile ports for iOS and Android were later released worldwide on November 17 and September 26 of 2017 respectively. A Nintendo Switch version published by Ziggurat Interactive was released on November 4, 2021. Limited Run Games published physical editions of the Switch and PlayStation 4 versions on May 13, 2022.

A compilation titled A Boy and His Blob Retro Collection by Ziggurat Interactive and Limited Run Games, powered by Limited Run's Carbon Engine, contains both A Boy and His Blob: Trouble on Blobolonia and The Rescue of Princess Blobette along with their respective Japanese versions. It was released for PlayStation 4, PlayStation 5 and Nintendo Switch on October 17, 2023, and Microsoft Windows on December 1.
