= A Boy and His Blob =

- Cover art
- Developer: WayForward (Note: Abstraction Games developed the HD and mobile versions.)
- Publishers: Majesco; Ziggurat Interactive (Nintendo Switch)
- Director: Sean Velasco
- Producer: Robb Alvey
- Designers: Michael Herbster; James Montagna; Michael Pace
- Programmers: Robert Koshak; Larry Holdaway; Daniel Yoon
- Artist: Marc Gomez
- Composer: Daniel Sadowski
- Series: A Boy and His Blob
- Platforms: Wii; Xbox One; PlayStation 3; PlayStation 4; PlayStation Vita; Windows; OS X; iOS; Linux; Android; Nintendo Switch
- Release: Wii: NA: October 13, 2009; EU: November 6, 2009; Windows, Linux, OS X, PlayStation 4: WW: January 19, 2016; Xbox One: WW: January 20, 2016; PlayStation Vita: EU: January 19, 2016; NA: January 21, 2016; PlayStation 3: WW: June 28, 2016; IOS: WW: November 17, 2017; Android: WW: September 26, 2017; Nintendo Switch: WW: November 4, 2021
- Genre: Puzzle-platform
- Mode: Single-player

A Boy and His Blob is a puzzle-platform game developed by WayForward and published by Majesco. It is a re-imagining of the 1989 video game, A Boy and His Blob: Trouble on Blobolonia, which was originally developed by Imagineering for the NES. The game was released for the Wii in North America on October 13 and in Europe on November 6, 2009. A high-definition port of the game developed by Abstraction Games was released on Xbox One, PlayStation 4, PlayStation Vita, Microsoft Windows, OS X, and Linux on January 20, 2016. A PlayStation 3 version was made available on June 28 of the same year as a cross-purchase with the PS4 and Vita versions. Mobile ports for iOS and Android were later released worldwide on November 17 and September 26, 2017, respectively. A Nintendo Switch version was released on November 4, 2021, by WayForward and Ziggurat Interactive.

WayForward's director Sean Velasco, a fan of the original NES title, expressed a desire to re-create and update the experience for current generation gamers, streamlining the NES title's gameplay mechanics to create a more "forgiving" experience. A Boy and His Blob's art direction has received widespread critical acclaim and praise, and was utilized by the developers, in addition to a minimalistic story, in order to create a "heartwarming... and friendly game" accessible to a wide audience.

== Gameplay ==
The "blob" is capable of a number of transformations in order to traverse the game's puzzles, such as a parachute to avoid damage from falls.

A Boy and His Blob is a 2D side-scrolling puzzle platformer in which players control a young boy as he cooperates with a blob-like creature to overcome various obstacles. The boy can feed the blob a variety of jelly beans, which are unlocked as the game progresses and vary depending on the level, which transforms it into one of fifteen different objects that can be used to solve puzzles and defeat enemies. These include ladders for climbing, anvils to drop on top of enemies, holes that allow the boy to drop through platforms, and cannons for shooting to the difficult-to-reach areas. Unlike the original NES game, which only displayed each jelly bean's flavor, this version allows players to select beans from a wheel that shows what each bean does. The boy can also hug and scold the blob, as well as call to it to revert its transformation and bring it to his side. However, the boy will die if he touches an enemy or a hazardous object, or falls from a great height, sending the player back to the beginning of the area. The game is split into four worlds, each containing ten levels and a boss battle. Finding three chests hidden within each main level unlocks additional challenge levels, which reward bonus developer material such as concept art and storyboards when cleared.

== Plot ==
The planet Blobolonia is threatened by an evil emperor, and the titular "blob" flees to Earth seeking help. It crash-lands on Earth and finds the eponymous "boy". They team up in order to dethrone the evil emperor, first by completing a quest on Earth and then by traveling to Blobolonia. Along the way, minions of the Emperor attempt to stop them.

== Development ==
The game's art design has garnered positive media attention and drew inspiration from a number of sources, including the films of Hayao Miyazaki.

WayForward's director Sean Velasco, a fan of the original NES title, felt the series "had a ton of potential" and was "a title whose time had come to be re-imagined". He felt the title would be a natural fit for WayForward's signature proprietary animation and 2D visuals. The rights to the series originally belonged to Absolute Entertainment, but Majesco was able to acquire the rights after Absolute went bankrupt in 1995. WayForward, already having a positive working relationship with Majesco, pitched the "idea of [creating] a very heartwarming Boy and Blob, and having a very friendly game" that both improved upon the usability of the original title and featured 2D hand-drawn animation "reminiscent of animated movies from the '80s". The designer of the NES title and co-founder of Activision, David Crane, was not involved with the Wii title, but the new developers expressed respect for both him and his work when creating the new title.

In terms of faithfulness to the original NES title, producer Robb Alvey explained that "(it's about) the original spirit of the game and creating something for this generation of gamers. If you're familiar with the original game, you'll recognize immediately the homage we pay to its origin. And if you've never played the original, it's not going to feel like anything 'retro'". Sean Velasco similarly expressed that the game is a "re-imagining" of the original title instead of a direct sequel or remake. Some changes made to the gameplay include frequent save checkpoints and unlimited jelly beans.

Marc Gomez, as art director, was responsible for most of the game's signature look and feel. He wanted to do something very soft, inspired by the works of filmmaker Hayao Miyazaki. The decision to make the boy "much younger and rounder" than his NES counterpart was also Marc's, as was the idea of making the blob "a more faithful companion (similar to) a dog". With the new, younger design for the boy and the blob, Marc "wanted them to have (a) mutual need for each other... One can't progress without the other". Overall, the game has around 4,000 unique frames of animation.

In terms of the game's controls, Sean Velasco wanted something "very intuitive for the family crowd" and wanted to "avoid anything that doesn't directly serve the game itself" such as, "waggle controls simply for the sake of waggle". The "hug" button is a vestigial feature of a more fleshed out emotion system abandoned during development. Managing the blob's emotions and keeping him happy throughout the game proved too much of a hassle during testing, so the mechanics were largely thrown out. Sean Velasco felt the in-game hug was "too heart-melting to ignore", so it was kept.

Velasco remarked that its simplicity allowed them to create a "very heartwarming...and friendly game" and to really highlight a "major component of the game, which is the friendship between the boy and blob". Gomez explained that "everything is about subtlety. There will be hints here and there letting you in on what is taking place. The story will develop as much as the player wants to venture in the details".

== Reception ==
Reception

Aggregate scores
Aggregator	Score
GameRankings	WII: 82%
Metacritic	WII: 80/100; PS4: 66/100; XONE: 66/100

Review scores
Publication	Score
1Up.com	B+
Game Informer	8/10
GameTrailers	8.5/10
IGN	7.6/10
Nintendo Power	8.5/10
X-Play	4/5
GameDaily	8/10

Reception for A Boy and His Blob has been largely positive, with many reviewers commenting on the game's art design and faithfulness to the feel of the NES original. Nintendo Power called it "a super magical adventure full of mesmerizing sights and compelling gameplay" and praised that the game "can be enjoyed on multiple levels and by players of all ages", giving it a score of 8.5/10. IGN praised the game's art direction, yet criticized the control scheme and "die-and-retry nature of the level designs", awarding the game a 7.6/10. GameTrailers likewise questioned aspects of the control scheme, but praised the game's puzzles and overall feel, giving the game a total score of 8.5/10.

Game Informer awarded the game an 8.0/10 (with a "second opinion" score of 8.75/10) calling the game "a stylish rebirth [of] the NES cult classic" and praising the game's learning curve, atmosphere, and nostalgia factor. Similar to other reviews they faulted the game's "twitchy controls". Joystiq noted that A Boy and His Blob was a "really good example of how to update a classic; the game feels new, yet retains what fans love about the original experience", yet expressed frustration at the game's need to "hold [your] hand" at times by providing "hints" to a puzzle's solution in the form of overabundant signs. They noted, however, that this feature may be appreciated by younger children and casual gamers.

1UP.com gave A Boy and His Blob a B+, noting occasional problems with the blob's AI and some shortcomings in terms of the game's secondary animation, but praising the game's more "forgiving" gameplay when compared to the NES A Boy and His Blob and calling the art "gorgeous". G4TV called the game "the kind of game the Wii was designed for".
