= IQue Player =

Chinese home video game console

iQue Player

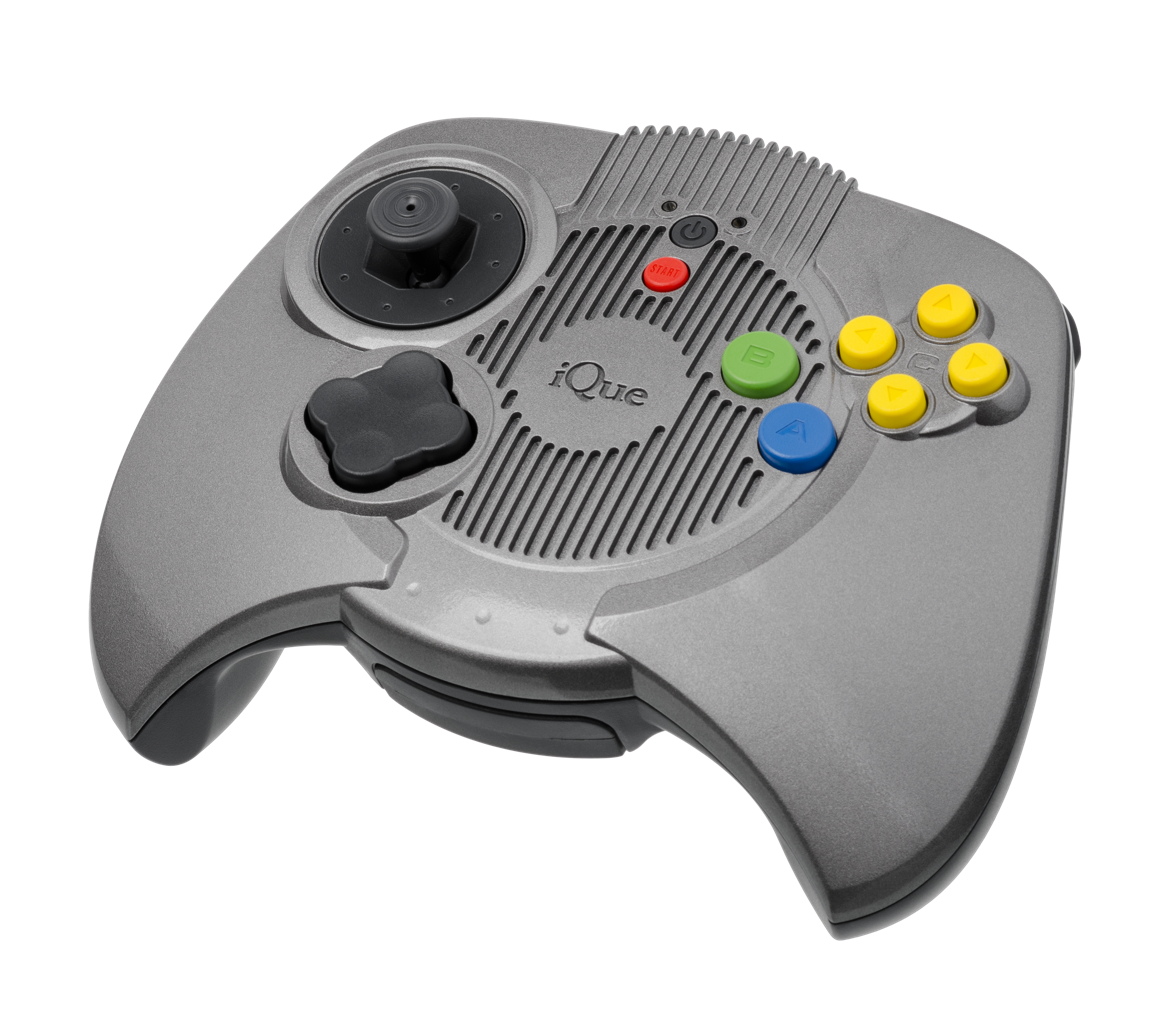
- iQue Player device
- Developer: Nintendo
- Manufacturer: iQue
- Type: Home video game console
- Generation: Fifth
- Released: CHN: November 18, 2003
- Introductory price: CN¥498
- Discontinued: 2016
- CPU: MIPS R-4300i @ 140.625 MHz
- Memory: 8 MB
- Graphics: SGI RCP @ 62.5 MHz
- Connectivity: USB (iQue@Home)
- Best-selling game: Dr. Mario 64 (pack-in)
- Related: Nintendo 64
- Website: iQue (in Chinese)

The iQue Player (Chinese: 神游机, romanized: Shén Yóu Jī) is a handheld TV game version of the Nintendo 64 console manufactured by iQue and released exclusively in mainland China. It was developed through a joint venture between Nintendo and engineer Wei Yen in response to China's ban on the sale of traditional home video game consoles. The system integrates the console hardware into the controller, which connects directly to a television, with a separate accessory enabling multiplayer support. A total of 14 games were released for the device.

== History ==
Due to the widespread black market for video games in China—where consumers often purchased pirated cartridges or downloaded game files for use with console emulators—Nintendo positioned the iQue Player as a secure and relatively affordable official alternative. The iQue Player adopted a handheld TV game format to circumvent a 2000 ban by the Ministry of Culture on the sale of traditional home video game consoles.

Nintendo established the iQue company in December 2002 as a joint venture with Taiwanese-American engineer Wei Yen. Yen had served as Senior Vice President at Silicon Graphics during the early 1990s, where he played a key role in the creation of Project Reality, which later became the Nintendo 64.

After leaving Silicon Graphics shortly after its work on Project Reality was complete, Yen established his own company, BroadOn, which would develop the cryptographic security system used in the iQue Player to deter piracy.

The iQue Player was officially announced at the Tokyo Game Show in September 2003, with a planned launch in mid-October in major cities including Shanghai, Guangzhou, and Chengdu, and a broader nationwide rollout scheduled for 2004.

To gain approval from the Ministry of Culture and potentially reverse the national ban on home video game consoles, Nintendo emphasized the educational and developmental benefits of gaming in its marketing strategy. The console featured a real-time clock, enabling parents to restrict playtime to specific hours. Upon launching a game, the system displayed a message discouraging prolonged play and encouraging regular breaks.

The launch of the iQue Player was slightly delayed to November 18, 2003, with a limited selection of five launch games. Sales of the iQue Player were modest, with estimates ranging between 8,000 and 12,000 units.

The final localized game released for the platform was Animal Crossing in 2006. On October 31, 2016, iQue announced that the iQue@Home service would be discontinued by the end of December that year. Servers were gradually deactivated, and all digital distribution services ceased by 2018.

== Technical details ==
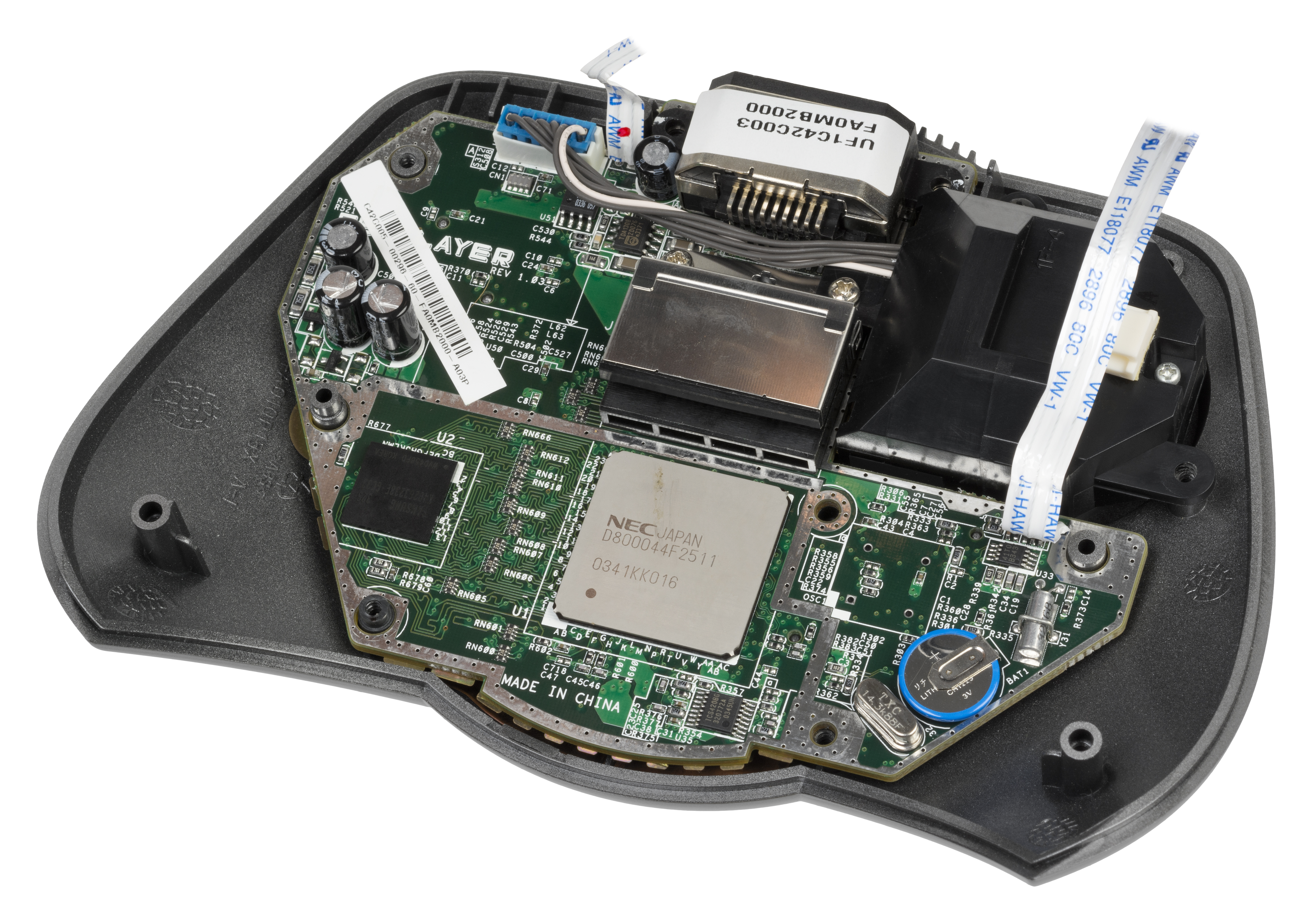
iQue Player motherboard

The iQue Player is a compact version of the Nintendo 64, using system-on-a-chip technology to run Nintendo 64 games ported specifically for the system.

- Processor: MIPS R-4300i 64-bit CPU @ 140.625 MHz
- Memory: 16 MB DDR SDRAM, 8 MB usable
- Graphics: 100,000 polygons per second, 2.09 million colors
- Sound: ADPCM 64

The iQue Player has been used in speedrunning due to its faster loading times and quicker text scrolling compared to the Nintendo 64.

== Games ==
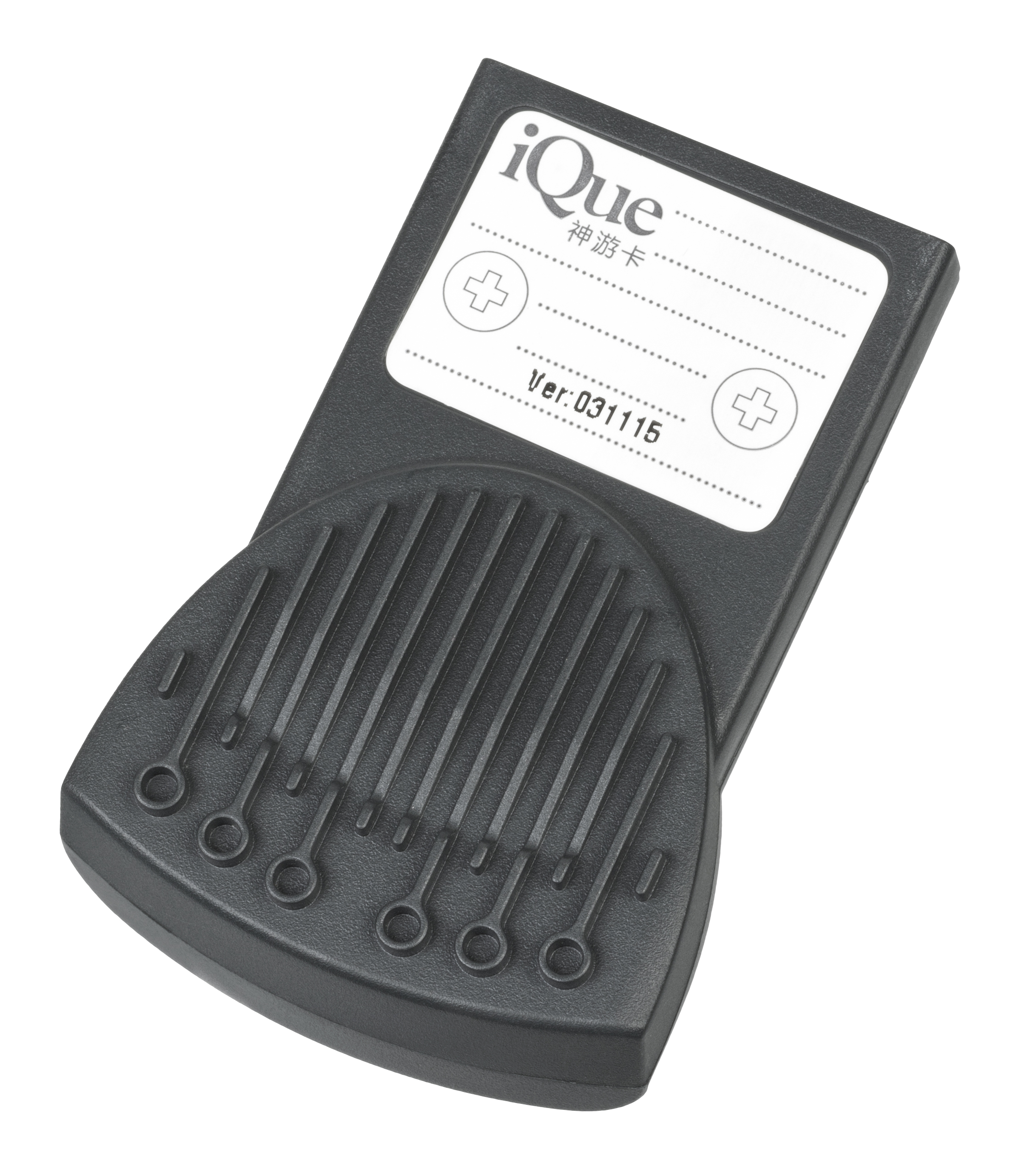
iQue game memory card

The iQue Player's library comprises 14 titles, all adapted from first-party Nintendo 64 games previously released in other regions. Although The Legend of Zelda: Majora's Mask was advertised on packaging and promotional materials, it never received an iQue release.

Games were localized into Chinese with translated text and, in most cases, dubbed voice acting. However, some titles, such as the Mario series and Sin and Punishment, retained their original English voice tracks. Several releases also incorporated bug fixes and minor gameplay adjustments to account for the iQue Player's lack of peripheral support, including the Rumble Pak.

Game distribution followed a model similar to the Famicom Disk System and Nintendo Power cartridge-rewriting service in Japan. Players brought memory cards to "iQue Depot" kiosks in retail stores to have games loaded. In October 2004, iQue@Home was introduced, an early form of digital distribution that allowed users to purchase games online and then connect the console to a PC via USB to transfer the title to the memory card.

With both distribution methods, games were tied to a specific console as a form of digital rights management (DRM). Newly purchased titles were loaded to memory cards as encrypted files and re-encrypted on first launch using a console-specific private key. This system significantly limited unauthorized copying in a market otherwise characterized by widespread piracy.

The iQue Player was bundled with a memory card that included several games: Dr. Mario 64 was fully playable, while Super Mario 64, Star Fox 64, The Legend of Zelda: Ocarina of Time, and Wave Race 64 were available as timed trials. The built-in real-time clock enforced trial limits based on minutes of play time, and full versions could later be unlocked through kiosks or iQue@Home.

Key
†	Full game included on the bundled memory card.
‡	Game demo included on the bundled memory card.

Original title	Release date
Dr. Mario 64 †	November 18, 2003
The Legend of Zelda: Ocarina of Time ‡	November 18, 2003
Star Fox 64 ‡	November 18, 2003
Super Mario 64 ‡	November 18, 2003
Wave Race 64 ‡	November 18, 2003
Mario Kart 64	December 25, 2003
F-Zero X	February 25, 2004
Yoshi's Story	March 25, 2004
Paper Mario	June 8, 2004
Sin and Punishment	September 25, 2004
Excitebike 64	June 15, 2005
Super Smash Bros.	November 15, 2005
Custom Robo	May 1, 2006
Animal Crossing	June 1, 2006
The Legend of Zelda: Majora's Mask	Unreleased

== See also ==
- Video gaming in China
