= Custom Robo Arena =

2006 video game

- North American box art
- Developer: Noise
- Publisher: Nintendo
- Director: Koji Kenjo
- Producer: Kensuke Tanabe
- Designers: Goro Iwasaki; Hidekazu Masaki; Hironobu Susuda
- Programmer: Keisuke Shiho
- Artist: Yoshiharu Sakakibara
- Writer: Koji Kenjo
- Composers: Takayuki Nakamura; Shingo Yasumoto; Kenji Nagashima; Tsubasa Waga
- Series: Custom Robo
- Platform: Nintendo DS
- Release: JP: October 19, 2006; NA: March 19, 2007; EU: May 25, 2007; AU: September 20, 2007
- Genre: Action role-playing
- Modes: Single-player, multiplayer

Custom Robo Arena, known in Japan as Gekitō Custom Robo, (Note: Japanese: 激闘!カスタムロボ, Hepburn: Gekitō! Kasutamu Robo) is an action role-playing video game developed by Noise and published by Nintendo for the Nintendo DS. It is the fifth game in Custom Robo series, and the first released in PAL regions. The game was released in October 2006 in Japan and 2007 internationally. It is the only game released for the Nintendo DS to feature a two-player mode with the Nintendo Wi-Fi Connection including voice chat, Multi-Card play, and DS Download Play. Custom Robo Arena uses a "Rivals" list.

Custom Robo Arena received average reviews from critics upon release. As of 2026, no further installments in the Custom Robo franchise have been released.

== Plot ==
The game starts with the story about a player-named male character whose father has just moved into the town of Midheart to work at NeoBrain, a robo research company. Upon arrival, the protagonist meets robo-battlers Liv and Dennis, and joins them.

Liv's interest in the robo-enhancing Soulboost will take the protagonist's team to Mt. Zephyr, where Stark will turn the protagonist away at the top. The protagonist then goes on police duty with police cadet Duncan. After an ambush with a rogue commander and a criminal, Dennis and Duncan become too weak to fight, and the protagonist is their last hope. Later, after the protagonist has defeated the criminal, the protagonist's team will return to Mt. Zephyr, having been given a note from Kris. Because of this, Stark will teach the protagonist the Soulboost.

Later, a tournament at the Robocenter will allow the protagonist to compete in the Robo Cup shortly after. The protagonist's team boards a ship headed for Encephalon Isle, where the Robo Cup is to take place. The President of NeoBrain makes a statement that the preliminaries will take place on the way. This raises questions by contestants about what happens to the losers.

They arrive at Encephalon Isle. But, the night before the tournament, however, Liv exhibits strange behavior, walking to the nearby laboratory by herself. She quickly snaps out of it, but she is entirely confused as to how she got out there on her own. The protagonist takes her back to the hotel.

The next day's tournament starts well, with various battles taking place according to the plan. The security Robos placed around the forest go haywire. Liv and the protagonist's father go missing half-way in as the security Robos take out commanders in the tournament. A NeoBrain employee reveals himself as Scythe, leader of the Greybaum Syndicate, an international terrorist organization that intends to use Robo technology to control the world.

Upon infiltrating the nearby Research Facility, it is learned that the President ultimately regrets his decision, and he helps the protagonist. The protagonist's father is also recovered. With Dennis, the two search for Liv in the underground fortress. The protagonist reunites with Liv's brother Eddy, though Eddy is soon injured by Scythe's Katana after gloating over his victory with an autonomous decoy.

They find Liv, but too late, as she is already 'diving' into Hadron, the most powerful illegal Robo ever created. The protagonist attacks Hadron, taking it down once. Hadron revitalizes itself with Scythe's energy, gaining his personality and dreams, then defeats the protagonist in a robo battle. Dennis and the protagonist's father manage to free Liv, although Hadron still functions. Every character on the protagonist's team is too weak to fight Hadron, and all seems hopeless. Then, all of the competitors in the Robo Cup that survived the security Robos walk in from behind, wanting to help. Liv, being drained of mental energy, cannot help. Instead, all of the competitors lend their mental energy to Liv, who then transfers it to the protagonist. Upon defeat, Hadron explodes. The haywire security Robos disengage, and the organization behind the disruption is shut down, but NeoBrain is left in pieces due to this event.

In the epilogue, the protagonist learns that Lambda Inc., teaming up with NeoBrain, has offered to host the Robo Cup again, but this time with "no strings attached". The protagonist becomes a Robo Cup champion, and sets their sights on joining the Police Force, and winning the Great Robo Cup. It is implied that the protagonist eventually enters the International Police Corps.

== Gameplay ==
Battles begin with the opponent's robo customization being shown. Protagonists then may make adjustments to their robo, such as changing parts, polishing, and altering the diorama. This can also be done outside of a battle, in the portable garage.

Battles begin with the protagonist's custom robo cube being launched out of a "Robo-Cannon" (controlled with the D-pad). There are six sides of the cube on which the robo can land.

The objective of the battle is to reduce the opponent's energy points from 1000 to 0 by using the protagonist's guns, bombs, pods, and dash attacks. There are two third-person views in battle and five different control schemes.

If the protagonist repeatedly loses the same battle, the game offers the option of a health handicap, which goes up to 75%. Each victory increases the protagonist's Soulboost meter and when it is full, Soulboost can be used. Soulboost makes the robo stronger and tougher for about 21 seconds, afterward making the robo weaker for a short time.

== Reception ==
Reception

Aggregate score
| Aggregator | Score |
|---|---|
| Metacritic | 74/100 |

Review scores
| Publication | Score |
|---|---|
| 1Up.com | B |
| Electronic Gaming Monthly | 7.83/10 |
| Eurogamer | 5/10 |
| Famitsu | 31/40 |
| GamePro | 3/5 |
| GameSpot | 7.9/10 |
| GameSpy | 4/5 |
| GameTrailers | 7.7/10 |
| IGN | 7/10 |
| Nintendo Power | 7.5/10 |
| 411Mania | 8.2/10 |

The game received "average" reviews according to video game review aggregator website Metacritic. In Japan, Famitsu gave it a score of three eights and one seven, for a total of 31 out of 40.

== Other appearances in media ==
Ray Mk III appeared as an Assist Trophy in the Wii video game Super Smash Bros. Brawl. He also appears as a Trophy and a Sticker in the same game. Ray Mk III also appears as a Spirit and a Mii Fighter Costume in Super Smash Bros. Ultimate.
