= Lists of cancelled video games =

This is a list of cancelled video game lists, sorted by platform.

== Microsoft ==
- List of cancelled Xbox games
- List of cancelled Xbox 360 games
- List of cancelled Xbox One games

== Nintendo ==
- List of cancelled NES games
- List of cancelled Game Boy games
- List of cancelled Super NES games
- List of cancelled Virtual Boy games
- List of cancelled Nintendo 64 games
- List of cancelled Game Boy Color games
- List of cancelled Game Boy Advance games
- List of cancelled GameCube games
- List of cancelled Nintendo DS games
- List of cancelled Wii games
- List of cancelled Nintendo 3DS games
- List of cancelled Wii U games
- List of cancelled Nintendo Switch games

== Sega ==
- List of cancelled Master System games
- List of cancelled Sega Genesis games
- List of cancelled Game Gear games
- List of cancelled Sega CD games
- List of cancelled 32X games
- List of cancelled Sega Saturn games
- List of cancelled Dreamcast games

== Sony ==
- List of cancelled PlayStation games
- List of cancelled PlayStation 2 games
- List of cancelled PlayStation Portable games
- List of cancelled PlayStation 3 games
- List of cancelled PlayStation Vita games
- List of cancelled PlayStation 4 games

== Other ==
- List of cancelled 3DO games
- List of cancelled Atari Lynx games
- List of cancelled Atari Jaguar games
- List of cancelled games for Commodore platforms
- List of cancelled games for NEC consoles
- List of cancelled X68000 games
- List of cancelled games for SNK consoles
- List of cancelled PC games

== See also ==
- Lists of video games
- List of video game websites
- Outline of video games
