= List of cancelled Xbox One games =

The Xbox One is a video game console released by Microsoft in 2013. It was their third console, following the original Xbox's 2001 release and the Xbox 360's 2005 release. This list documents games that were confirmed for the Xbox One at some point, but did not end up being released for it in any capacity.

== Games ==
There are currently 18 games on this list. (Note: This number is always up to date by this script.)

List of cancelled Xbox One games
Title(s)	Notes/Reasons	Developer	Publisher
Untitled Black Tusk Studios project	At E3 2013, Microsoft announced the formation of a new video game development studio, Black Tusk Studios, and showed footage of a game they were working on, which featured a look similar to the Splinter Cell series of games. However, the following year, after Microsoft purchased the Gears of War IP from Epic Games, the team was renamed The Coalition, and the project was abandoned in favor of developing Gears of War 4 (2016).	Black Tusk Studios	Microsoft
Fable Legends	Originally starting development in 2012 and announced publicly the following year, the game featured a troubled development process and public perception as the team attempted to mold prior Fable games series gameplay into a games as a service and free to play model. The game was almost finished, and even ran a brief beta test, but Microsoft was unhappy with the project and cancelled it in 2016. The project cost over 75 million USD, and led to the closure of Lionhead Studios.	Lionhead Studios	Microsoft
Fez 2	A sequel to Fez (2012) was announced at E3 2013, but cancelled a month later. Around the time of cancellation, creator Phil Fish cited constant negativity in the industry, culminating with a heated argument had with the GameTrailers host Marcus Beer. A decade later, Fish additionally conceded that he also wasn't feeling particularly motivated to make another sequel after the first game's difficult 5 year development period. He also mentioned very little work had been completed at the time of cancellation.	Polytron Corporation	Trapdoor
Football Manager 25	The 2025 iteration of the yearly Football Manager franchise was delayed twice before eventually being cancelled outright. The developers cited internal concerns about its quality, and that any further delays would move it too far the past the start of the current football season. The team instead deciding to cancel the game in favor of focusing on the 2026 iteration.	Sports Interactive	Sega
Gal Gun Returns	A remake of the original Gal Gun was announced for the Nintendo Switch, Windows, and Xbox One. The latter version was cancelled after some of the game's content failed to get approval by Microsoft.	Inti Creates	PCube
Gotham Knights	Gotham Nights was originally announced for PS5, PS4, Windows, Xbox One, and Xbox Series X/S. The PlayStation 5 and Xbox Series X/S Versions were released in 2022 while the PlayStation 4 and Xbox One version were cancelled because WB Games Montréal thought it was better off focusing efforts to deliver a polished experience on PlayStation 5 and Xbox Series X/S.	WB Games Montréal	Warner Bros. Interactive Entertainment
Hellraid	A dark fantasy first person game in development for the Xbox One, PlayStation 4, and Windows, with a release date scheduled for 2015. The game was cancelled due to not meeting the developer's internal expectations, and was cancelled in favor of pursuing further entries in the Dying Light series of games after the first title exceeded their expectations commercially.	Techland	Techland
Human Element	Starting development in 2012 and being announced at The Game Awards in 2014, the game was an ambitious first person shooter by Robert Bowling, who had previously worked on Call of Duty titles. Announced for the Wii U, PlayStation 4, Xbox One, and PC platforms, development was put on hiatus before being cancelled in early 2015 due to the inability to fund the game and subsequent closure of developer Robotoki.	Robotoki	Robomodo
Hyenas	Hyenas was announced in 2022 as part of IGN's Summer of Gaming Event. It was going to be a FPS game for Windows, PS4, PS5, Xbox One, Xbox Series X/S and was going to be a free-to-play similar to Fortnite and Apex Legends. In early August 2023, Sega executives publicly called Hyenas' development "challenging", raising the possibility it would be cancelled, and stated they would look at "adjusting" the game's business model, possibly to free-to-play. Its development was halted by Sega on September 28, 2023 along with multiple other unannounced games, due to "lower profitability of the European region".	Creative Assembly	Sega
Ion	Announced at E3 2015 as a game coming from DayZ creator Dean Hall for the Xbox One and Windows. The game was to be a massively multiplayer online game taking place in a secluded space station. The game was worked on for over a year, but dropped with Hall and his game company realized they could not handled the large scope of the envisioned game.	RocketWerkz	Improbable
Lego James Bond	In 2016, TT Games pitched a new entry in their long running line of Lego games, this time based on the James Bond film franchise. The pitch was rejected due to the films' adult themes and level of violence being too extreme for the Lego brand's family-friendly demographic. A trailer for the game was later leaked in 2024.	TT Games	Warner Bros. Interactive Entertainment
Phantom Dust remake	A remake of Phantom Dust (2004) was announced for the Xbox One at E3 2014. However, disagreements on scope of new material and budget between developer Darkside Game Studios and publisher Microsoft lead to Microsoft's cancellation of the game in 2015 in favor of a bare-bones remaster of the original game by another company in 2017. Footage of the remake version leaked onto the internet in 2015.	Darkside Game Studios	Microsoft
Project Knoxville	A survival-based game announced in 2015 for the Xbox One, the game was cancelled the following year after Microsoft decided to close its developer, Press Play.	Press Play	Microsoft
Scalebound	An RPG collaboration between developer PlatinumGames and publisher Microsoft announced at E3 2014. The game had a 4 year development period, and positive reception from the press at expos, but was cancelled in early 2017. While no official reason was given other than it was Microsoft's decision, the relationship between the two companies reportedly soured in 2016, and the game had been falling behind in its release schedule.	PlatinumGames	Microsoft
Stormlands / Defiance	The game was never announced publicly during its extensive development period, but rather detailed by Eurogamer well after the fact in 2017. Development started in 2006 on the Xbox 360 as a third person action role playing game in the vein of Fallout: New Vegas running on the Dungeon Siege 3 game engine. The team created a pitch demo on the 360 that managed to greenlight the project with Microsoft, but the game would experience years of revisions and changes at the request of Microsoft. As the game shifted to being an Xbox One launch title, complications of scope and technology accumulated, and Microsoft eventually cancelled the game in 2012. Some work on the game was salvaged to be used in their future PC release Tyranny (2016).	Obsidian Entertainment	Microsoft
Tom Clancy's Ghost Recon Frontline	A new battle royale entry in the Ghost Recon series was announced back in October 2021 for PC, PlayStation 4, PlayStation 5, Xbox One, Xbox Series X/S, and Google Stadia. Nine months later, Ubisoft cancelled the game due to negative feedback received during the game's announcement and its closed beta test.	Ubisoft Bucharest; Ubisoft Kyiv	Ubisoft
Tom Clancy's Rainbow 6: Patriots	A new entry in the Tom Clancy's Rainbow Six series was announced in 2011 for Xbox 360, PlayStation 3, and PC via a trailer with pre-rendered target footage. In 2013, it was announced that the game had shifted to the next generation of consoles, though the project experienced several issues in the transition and needed to be rebooted. By 2014, it had been confirmed that Patriots had been cancelled and that the series would be rebooted with Tom Clancy's Rainbow Six: Siege (2015).	Ubisoft Montreal, Red Storm Entertainment, Ubisoft Toronto	Ubisoft
Wonder Flick R	A cross-platform JRPG announced for iOS, Android, Nintendo 3DS, Xbox One, PlayStation 3, PlayStation 4, PlayStation Vita, and Wii U. The game was intended to support cross-saving, allowing the player to save progress on one platform and pick up where they left off on another. Gameplay also occurred on two separate screens, whether it be on dual screen platforms like Wii U and 3DS, or through other means like remote play. While the mobile versions released in early 2014 in Japan, it suffered from a troubled launch and short lifespan, being shut down just a year later, leading to the cancellation of all console versions.	Level-5	Level-5
