= List of Nintendo Switch games =

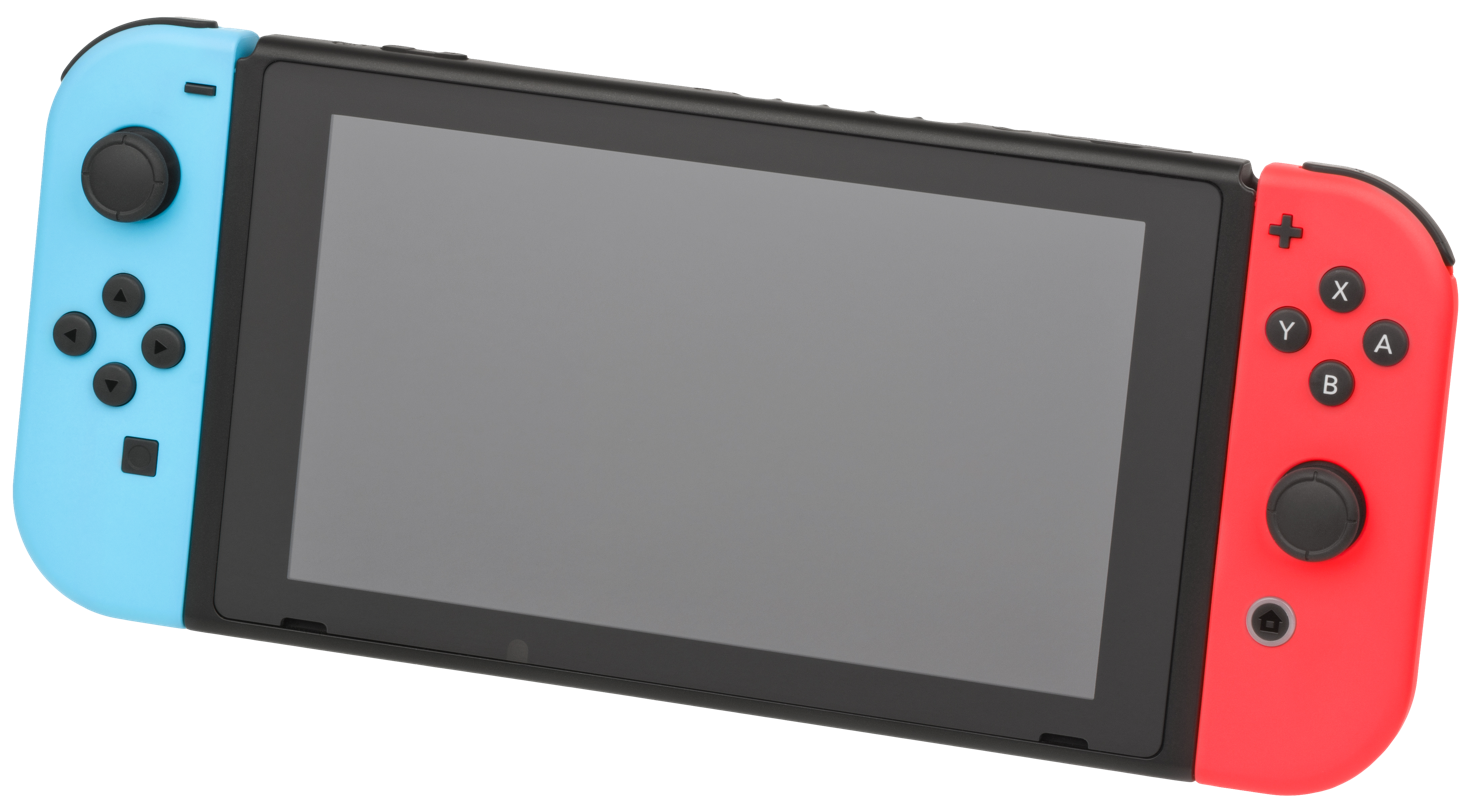
The Nintendo Switch console in handheld mode, with Neon Blue and Neon Red Joy-Con connected

The Nintendo Switch is a video game console developed by Nintendo, for which games are released both in physical and digital formats. Physical games are sold on cartridges that slot into the Switch console unit. Digital games are purchased through the Nintendo eShop and stored either in the Switch's internal 32 GB of storage (64 GB in the OLED version) or on a microSDXC card. The Switch has no regional lockout features, freely allowing games from any region to be played on any system, with the exception of Chinese game cards released by Tencent that play only on consoles distributed by Tencent. Even after the release of the successor console, the Nintendo Switch 2, in 2025, games continue to be released on the original Switch console; the Switch 2 is backward compatible with most of the Switch games.

Switch games are listed across seven pages due to technical limitations. There are currently 4112 games across these seven lists:

- List of Nintendo Switch games (0–9)
- List of Nintendo Switch games (A–Am)
- List of Nintendo Switch games (An–Az)
- List of Nintendo Switch games (B)
- List of Nintendo Switch games (C–G)
- List of Nintendo Switch games (H–P)
- List of Nintendo Switch games (Q–Z)

Not included in the main list are:

- Nintendo Classics
- Arcade Archives games
- Sega Ages games
- G-Mode Archives games

Other related lists include:

- List of best-selling Nintendo Switch video games
- List of cancelled Nintendo Switch games
