= Jennifer Diane Reitz =

American writer and game designer (born 1959)

- Born: December 30, 1959 (age 66); Baker City, Oregon
- Notable work: Boppin', Unicorn Jelly
- Partners: Eldenath DeVilya (1982–present); Sandra Woodruff (present); Stephen Lepisto (present)
- Parents: Leonard (father); Margaret (mother)
- Website: jenniverse.com

Jennifer Diane Reitz (born December 30, 1959) is an American writer, webcomic author, and game designer. She is known for the website Happy Puppy, which she opened with her partners, Stephen P. Lepisto and Sandra Woodruff, and with whom she created the video game Boppin'. Reitz has also done game work for Interplay.

On February 14, 1995, Reitz and her partners launched the game website Happy Puppy where they posted game demos. For a period of time, the website was the most visited game website on the Internet and had about 2.5 million downloads per month during 1996, the same year Happy Puppy was acquired by Attitude Network. The website later went offline in 2006. Reitz writes game reviews and co-founded a family company, Accursed Toys.

Reitz is a trans woman and the founder of the site Transsexuality (transsexual.org), a site with general information on transsexualism that hosts the COGIATI (Combined Gender Identity And Transsexuality Inventory) test. The test has been criticized for relying on stereotypical views of gender; it assumes, for example, that a lack of interest in mathematics is a feminine trait.

== Biography ==
Jennifer Diane Reitz was born on December 30, 1959, in Baker City, Oregon. Her father, Leonard Reitz, was a cartographer for the USGS, with much of his work being surrounded in secrecy. Her mother, Margaret, was about 15 years older than Leonard. Due to Leonard's job, Jennifer's family moved often, recounting that they did not stay anywhere longer than six months. Although at first they stayed in different apartments, they ended up living in trailer parks. The relationship with her parents was on the whole cold, though her mother used to be warmer until Jennifer turned 10. This emotional distance turned into hostility after Jennifer began to realize her gender dysphoria at an early age, as she had been born male but felt female. She felt alienated from boys, as they were more interested in violence and athletic pursuits.

Jennifer excelled through her school years, especially at science, which along with science fiction served as escapism. In addition, she developed a passion for dancing, singing, and playing with stuffed animals. Those traditionally feminine interests soon created conflict with her peers and family. Although Margaret was usually tolerant, Leonard showed extreme hostility and constantly threw away Jennifer's toys, so she resorted to playing in secret. This, coupled with years of verbal and physical harassment in school, caused Jennifer to interiorize the heteronormativity around her. This however changed at age 15, when Jennifer watched Bambi and quickly developed an obsession with it, watching it multiple times. She identified with the young Bambi, as in her view the film showed a character that, despite being male, looked and acted female in every way. This compelled her to take her gender identity more seriously, until, at age 17, she confessed her feelings to her art teacher, who violently rejected her. She returned to hiding her identity.

Jennifer later enrolled in college to study biochemistry. Although she was about to settle down with a woman (while still under a male identity), Jennifer was becoming increasingly depressed. This culminated in a suicide attempt on May 30, 1981, using a combination of sleeping pills and a carbon dioxide mask. After praying to different gods, she underwent a mystical experience that resulted in an epiphany about her identity. Her relationship with the woman ended soon after.

Jennifer later sought hormonal treatment, but it became increasingly difficult to maintain her job as she went further into the transition. This led to her becoming homeless, but she was eventually able to secure employment and settle through the help of her friends and family, though the latter did so begrudgingly, resulting in her father attempting to murder her. One year later, after a course of hormones, Jennifer underwent gender transition surgery in 1982, and legally adopted the name and identity that she has used since then.

She then cohabited with Sandra, her girlfriend at the time. As years passed on, Eldenath and Stephen (a friend from high school) joined in, forming a polyamorous marriage that has lasted to the present day.

== Works ==
=== Video games ===
- Multiverse (canceled) — a cancelled game for the Commodore 64 and Amiga that was pitched to Activision in 1986. It would've been a procedurally generated exploration game where "you could see things no other human had ever seen." Elements from the game would appear in her later, such as the world plates. All info about the game is documented on Jennifer's personal website.
- Boppin' — a puzzle game created by Jennifer in 1991, developed under the company Accursed Toys and published by Karmasoft for the Amiga computer. Around that time Karmasoft held a level design contest. The game sold poorly with 284 copies, so Jennifer got it republished by Apogee Software (now known as 3D Realms) with up to 256 colors on screen. Due to mature content containing blood and seppuku, Apogee included a disclaimer in the manual that the game contained potentially offensive imagery, as well as part of a manifesto from Accursed Toys stating that their games were produced for an audience of adult gamers who are mostly 25 and older. Accursed Toys was also the namesake for Accursed Farms as confirmed by Ross in the episode of Ross's Game Dungeon about the game.
- Kokoro Wish (canceled) — another cancelled game made by Jennifer along with Stephen in 2000. It was meant to be an RPG that focused on relationships and emotions that was stated to have been a dream project for her for 14 years. It was cancelled for reasons stated to "complex, personal, and involve much sorrow and pain", likely a mix between unachievable scale and personal drama. The unfinished source code was released after the game and is available in archives. The namesake is also colloquially used for an infamous web comic made by Jennifer that became a meme.

=== Webcomics ===
- Cosmo Chronicles — a comic made by Jennifer in 1968 when she was 8.
- Unicorn Jelly
- Pastel Defender Heliotrope
- To Save Her
- Impossible Things Before Breakfast

== See also ==
- Danielle Bunten Berry
- Rebecca Heineman
