= List of cancelled Wii U games =

The Wii U is a video game console launched by Nintendo in 2012. While Nintendo found success in its predecessor, the Wii, in the 2000s, the Wii U was a commercial failure. Its concept and usage of the Wii U GamePad confused consumers, and its hardware, while comparable to the PlayStation 3 and Xbox 360, was significantly weaker than the PlayStation 4 and Xbox One launched a year later. As a result, sales stalled, leading to a small userbase, and third party developers struggled with getting multiplatform games running on it. This, combined with the system's short lifespan, lead to several game cancellations, with some instead releasing versions of these cancelled games on the Wii U's successor, the Nintendo Switch. This list documents games that were announced for the Wii U at some point, but did not end up being released for it in any capacity.

== Games ==
There are currently 34 games on this list. (Note: This number is always up to date by this script.)

List of cancelled Wii Ugames
Title(s)	Notes/Reasons	Developer	Publisher
Aliens: Colonial Marines	Originally released on the PlayStation 3, Xbox 360, and Windows in February 2013, the Wii U version was cancelled two months later. While no official reason was given, the released versions were reviewed extremely poorly, and the status of the Wii U version's release had been an uncertainty for some period prior.	Demiurge Studios	Sega
Ashes Cricket 2013	Originally released on PC to scathing reviews, the game was shortly after pulled from Steam, and planned console versions for Wii U, PlayStation 3, and Xbox 360 were cancelled.	Trickstar Games	505 Games
The Avengers	A first-person brawler video game set to be released in 2012 to coincide with the release of the 2012 film of the same name was announced for many platforms, Wii U included. However, THQ's financial difficulties at the time led to multiple games being delayed or cancelled, and with this project being tied to the timing of the film's release, it was ultimately scrapped and not released on any platforms.	Blue Tongue Entertainment	THQ
Bizerta: Silent Evil	Development on the game started on PlayStation Vita before realizing the hardware was not powerful enough to fulfill the game's vision. Development was moved to Wii U, and was reportedly in development for multiple years, but never released in any capacity.	Edrox Interactive	
Bloodstained: Ritual of the Night	After the game's successful 2015 Kickstarter campaign, a Wii U version of the multiplatform game was planned. However, the game's development time outlasted the lifespan of the Wii U, and so it was cancelled in favor of a Nintendo Switch version, which launched in June 2019, a week after the PlayStation 4, Xbox One, and Windows versions.	ArtPlay, DICO	
C-Wars	While the game's Kickstarter stretch-goal for releases on Wii U, Nintendo 3DS, PlayStation Vita, Linux, and Android, only the Windows and macOS versions ever released, in 2015.	Onipunks Studio	Onipunks Studio
Crysis 3	Originally released for PlayStation 3, Xbox 360, and Windows, developer Crytek had a version of the game up and running on the Wii U as well, but it was never released due to publisher Electronic Arts' loss of interest in publishing Wii U games, Crytek's lack of license to self-publish, and Nintendo not stepping in to help. Crysis 3 Remastered would later be published by Crytek on the Nintendo Switch in 2021.	Crytek	Electronic Arts
Eternal Darkness 2	In 2012, Kotaku reported that Eternal Darkness developer Silicon Knights had been working on a sequel in the years prior while concurrently developing X-Men: Destiny. However, development reportedly struggled, with much of the staff being inexperienced and not from the original development team. The limited work done on the title was described as being in rough shape, and after Silicon Knights' legal battles with Epic Games and subsequent closure, the title was cancelled.	Silicon Knights	
Gunlord	In September 2013, Gunlord (2012) developer NG:Dev.Team attempted to raise €40,000 via Indiegogo to crowdfund ports of the game to Nintendo 3DS and Wii U. However, the campaign was prematurely cancelled later that month due to slow funding progress.	NG:Dev.Team	NG:Dev.Team
Hex Heroes	Following a successful Kickstarter campaign, Hex Heroes was originally slated for release on Wii U, and was planned to utilize the Gamepad's functions. However, the game entered development hell, and was still unfinished at the time the Wii U eShop was shut down.	Prismatic Games	
Hollow Knight	Originally announced in 2014 for a release the following year, the Wii U was one of many planned platforms for the game. A build of the game was up and running on the Wii U, though delays caused development to expand beyond its lifespan, and it was cancelled in favor of a Nintendo Switch release in 2018 alongside other versions.	Team Cherry	Team Cherry
Human Element	Starting development in 2012 and being announced at The Game Awards in 2014, the game was an ambitious first person shooter by Robert Bowling, who had previously worked on Call of Duty titles. Announced for the Wii U, PlayStation 4, Xbox One, and PC platforms, development was put on hiatus before being cancelled in early 2015 due to the closure of developer Robotoki.	Robotoki	Robomodo
Hyper Light Drifter	Originally announced for Wii U, PlayStation 4, Xbox One, PlayStation Vita, and PC platforms, the Wii U and Vita versions were later cancelled due to the developers struggling to get it running on their respective hardware, and health issues that were also taking their toll. Other versions released in 2016, and a handheld version finally released on the Nintendo Switch in 2018.	Heart Machine	Heart Machine
Kerbal Space Program	Originally released for PC platforms in 2015, many home console ports were announced shortly thereafter, including the Wii U. While ports for PlayStation and Xbox platforms released the following year, the Wii U version was cancelled in 2017 due to the end of the console's life cycle.	Flying Tiger Entertainment	
Lobodestroyo	The game was successfully crowdfunded via Kickstarter in 2013, and was slated for release on Wii U. However, the game remains still in development as of 2025, long after the end of the Wii U's life cycle.	Handed Games Studios	
Metro: Last Light	Originally announced for the Xbox 360, PlayStation 3, and Wii U, the Wii U version was cancelled early on due to technical limitations with its hardware, and the development team being already pushed to their limits porting the PS3 version.	4A Games	Deep Silver
The Next Penelope	A 2015 release that mixed the gameplay of Rock n' Roll Racing with the story of The Odyssey. The Wii U version was in development for years, but issues arose in trying to relay its HTML5 language to the Wii U, and was later cancelled outright upon Nintendo's announcement of the console's discontinuation.	Aurelien Regard	
Pac-Man Museum	Originally announced for Wii U, Nintendo 3DS, PlayStation 3, Xbox 360 and PC platforms, the Wii U and 3DS versions were cancelled in 2014.	Bandai Namco	Bandai Namco
Poi	Originally announced as a game in development for Wii U and PC, development spanned longer than the Wii U's lifecycle, leading that version to be cancelled in favor of 2017 releases on the Nintendo Switch, PlayStation 4, and Xbox One.	PolyKid	PolyKid
Project CARS	Originally announced for the Wii U, PlayStation 3, Xbox 360, and Windows, when PS3 and 360 versions were cancelled in favor of PlayStation 4 and Xbox One versions, the development team began having trouble getting the game running on Wii U hardware. Notably, they could only get the frame rate up to 23 frames per second, when their publisher demanded it hit 30 frames per second to be released. While potentially possible, it was deemed too difficult to achieve 30 fps within the development timeframe, and was cancelled.	Slightly Mad Studios	Bandai Namco
Project Giant Robot	Announced by Nintendo at E3 2014 alongside Project Guard, the game involved players using the Wii U GamePad to control a giant robot on the TV screen, including attacking with the joysticks and using the motion controls to maintain its center of balance. While Guard was used to create Star Fox Guard, Giant Robot was cancelled in 2017, as the game was strongly tied to Wii U hardware, and Nintendo began focusing on the then-upcoming Nintendo Switch hardware instead.	Nintendo	Nintendo
Putty Squad remake	A remake of the original 1992 Putty Squad was announced for a variety of platforms, including Wii U. However, the Wii U version never released, though a Nintendo Switch version released instead in 2017.	System 3	System 3
Rive	Originally announced in 2014 for the Wii U, PlayStation 4, and Windows, the game's delay into 2016 led to the cancellation of the Wii U version in favor of a Nintendo Switch release in 2017.	Two Tribes	Two Tribes
Road Redemption	Originally in development for PC platforms, PlayStation 4, Xbox One, and Wii U after a successful Kickstarter campaign in 2013, the game featured an extended development period, with particularly difficult development on the Wii U due to it being the weakest of the hardware being developed for. Despite assurances that it was still in development as of 2016, in the years following, they announced it had been cancelled in favor of a Nintendo Switch version, where it released with other platforms across 2017 and 2018.	Pixel Dash Studios	Tripwire Interactive
Sacrilegium	Originally announced as a survival horror game coming to the Wii U, PlayStation 3, Xbox 360, and PC platforms, the game never released in any capacity.	Reality Pump Studios	TopWare Interactive
Sadness	Announced in 2006 for the Wii, very little info or footage was released afterwards, and it was cancelled in 2010 when developer Nibris went bankrupt. Developers HullBreach Studios and Cthulhi Games teamed up to buy the rights and restart development for the Wii U in 2014, with a 2016 release target, but the game never materialized.	Nibris	
Shaq Fu: A Legend Reborn	A sequel to Shaq Fu (1994) was crowdfunded via Indiegogo in 2014, with plans to release the finished game for PC, PlayStation 3, PlayStation 4, Xbox 360, Xbox One, and Wii U. In 2018, it was announced that the PS3, 360, and Wii U versions had been cancelled, while the remaining versions were released later that year.	Saber Interactive, Big Deez Productions	Mad Dog Games
Star Fox Armada	After successfully rebooting Metroid (Metroid Prime) and Donkey Kong Country (Donkey Kong Country Returns), developer Retro Studios aimed to reboot the Star Fox series. They proposed a new entry involving characters with a puppet visual aesthetic and an emphasis on multiplayer, but it was not greenlit by Nintendo.	Retro Studios	Nintendo
Untitled Star Wars game (codenamed Damage internally)	A proposed Star Wars title for the Wii that would have involved exploring Darth Maul's origin story and using Wii Remote's motion control capability to simulate the use of a lightsaber. Discussions between LucasArts and Nintendo would have had Red Fly Studio, the company responsible for porting The Force Unleashed to the Wii, developing the title. However, Nintendo declined to fund the game as a first party game development project. While it was briefly pursued for other platforms, LucasArts eventually lost faith in the project and cancelled it. Years later, the developers attempted to revive it for the Wii U, but this never materialized either.	Red Fly Studio	LucasArts
Stardew Valley	A Wii U version of the multi-platform game was announced at E3 2016, but later cancelled in favor of a Nintendo Switch version due to the dwindling Wii U userbase.	ConcernedApe	
Tom Clancy's Ghost Recon Phantoms	Originally announced as Ghost Recon Online for the Wii U and PC platforms, the team halted worked on the Wii U game to focus on launching the PC version. While the team left the possibility open to returning to the Wii U version, the PC version was taken offline in December 2016, and the game was never revisited for Wii U.	Ubisoft	Ubisoft
Wonder Flick R	A cross-platform JRPG announced for iOS, Android, Nintendo 3DS, Xbox One, PlayStation 3, PlayStation 4, PlayStation Vita, and Wii U. The game was intended to support cross-saving, allowing the player to save progress on one platform and pick up where they left off on another. Gameplay also occurred on two separate screens, whether it be on dual screen platforms like Wii U and 3DS, or through other means like remote play. While the mobile versions released in early 2014 in Japan, it suffered from a troubled launch and short lifespan, being shut down just a year later, leading to the cancellation of all console versions.	Level-5	Level-5
Yooka-Laylee	After its successful 2015 Kickstarter campaign, a Wii U version of the multiplatform game was in development. However, by late 2016, developer Playtonic Games announced that technical issues were preventing the game from launching on the platform. A Nintendo Switch version was announced and released in late 2017 instead, six months after the other versions of the game.	Playtonic Games	Team17
Young Justice: Legacy	The game's publisher cancelled the Wii and Wii U versions of the game, citing "quality issues" and "lack of interest at retail", though versions of the game still released in 2013 for Nintendo 3DS, PlayStation 3, Xbox 360 and Windows.	Little Orbit	Warner Bros. Interactive Entertainment
