= List of cancelled PlayStation 2 games =

The PlayStation 2 is a video game console released by Sony in 2000. As of 2026, it is the best selling game console of all time, releasing over 4300 games between its launch and its final official release in 2013. This list documents games that were announced for the PlayStation 2 at some point, but did not end up being released for it in any capacity.

== Games ==
There are currently 78 games on this list. (Note: This number is always up to date by this script.)

List of cancelled PlayStation 2 games
Title(s)	Notes/Reasons	Developer	Publisher
100 Bullets	A video game adaption of the 100 Bullets comic book series was announced by Acclaim Entertainment for release on the PlayStation 2 and Xbox. This version of the game was cancelled amid Acclaim's financial troubles in the mid-2000s. D3 Publisher obtained the rights to the franchise shortly after, and announced plans to release an unrelated game in the franchise for a variety of platforms, though none of those versions ever materialized either. The comic's primary writer, Brian Azzarello, later explained that the developers had trouble translating the comic's story into the video game format.	Acclaim Studios Austin	Acclaim Entertainment
12 Volt	A slot car racing game with the ability for the cars to shift lanes was announced in August 2004 for Xbox, PlayStation 2, GameCube and PC, but failed to materialize.	Sproing Interactive	
6Gun	A military-themed third person shooter game announced in 2005 for the PlayStation 2, PlayStation Portable, and the original Xbox scheduled for release the following year. A few screenshots were shown at the time of its announcement, but the game was cancelled after the closure of its developer.	Battleborn	
America's Army: Rise of a Soldier	Originally announced for Xbox and PlayStation 2, only the Xbox version released in 2005.	United States Army	Ubisoft
American McGee's Alice	A port of American McGee's Alice (2000) was in development but was later cancelled, resulting in the closure of Rogue Entertainment and American McGee's departure from Electronic Arts.	Rogue Entertainment	Electronic Arts
Batman: Dark Tomorrow	Originally planned as a GameCube exclusive, ports were later announced for PlayStation 2 and Xbox, though the PlayStation 2 version was the only one not to release.	HotGen	Kemco
Battlebots	A fighting game based on the Battlebots TV series was demonstrated at E3 2002. Players would be able to win in-game currency to buy parts, which could then be used to customize their bot. The game was also planned to feature 80 different pre-made bots, roughly half of which originated from the show, along with multiple arenas and four-player multiplayer support. Players could use a dual analog control scheme to operate each of a bot's treads individually, or an alternate simplified control scheme using only one analog stick. The game was scheduled for a November 2002 release on PlayStation 2 and GameCube, but failed to materialize, presumably due to the show's cancellation. A prototype of the game was later discovered in 2022.	Warthog Games	THQ
Battlestations: Midway	Originally planned for release on PlayStation 2, Xbox, and Gizmondo, all three versions were cancelled after publisher SCi Games dropped the game. It was later picked up by Eidos Interactive, who released the game in 2007 for Xbox 360 and PC.		SCi Games
Black 9	A third-person action game taking place in a dystopian future, with gameplay mechanics and setting in the vein of System Shock (1994). The game was in development for the PlayStation 2, PC, and the original Xbox. Amid rumors of its cancellation in mid-2004 due to its developer, Taldren, facing financial difficulties, in June 2004, its publisher Majesco confirmed the game had been cancelled, and Taldren closed down shortly after.	Taldren	Majesco
Black & White	PlayStation 2 and Xbox versions of Black & White (2001) were scheduled to be released in late 2002, but never materialized.	Lionhead Studios	Electronic Arts
Bling Bling	Development began on PlayStation 2 in 2003 before later shifting to Xbox 360 and ultimately releasing as Saints Row (2006).	Volition	THQ
Call of Cthulhu: Dark Corners of the Earth	Originally announced for PC and PlayStation 2, the game only released on PC and Xbox in 2005.	Headfirst Productions	JoWooD
Capcom vs. SNK 3 / Capcom Fighting All-Stars	Following the release of Capcom vs. SNK 2 (2001), Capcom began work on a third entry in the Capcom vs. SNK series utilizing 3D graphics, set for release on PlayStation 2 and arcade hardware. However, the game was cancelled due to SNK facing bankruptcy at the time. As a result of changes brought on by SNK's financial situation, a team of roughly 20 staff members left the company to join Capcom, and decided to repurpose the assets created for Capcom vs. SNK 3 into a new project. This became Capcom Fighting All-Stars, a 3D crossover fighter featuring characters from multiple Capcom properties, including Street Fighter, Rival Schools, and Final Fight, along with original characters and a guest character from SNK's The King of Fighters. Capcom held a series of limited location tests for the arcade version between 2002–2003, where they received negative feedback from players. After several more months in development, the game was canceled in August 2003.	Capcom	Capcom
Carrier: The Next Mutation	A sequel to Carrier (2000) was announced but never released.	Jaleco	Jaleco
City of the Dead	A video game based on George A. Romero's Living Dead films was announced for PlayStation 2, Xbox, and PC in 2005. The game was never released due to its publisher, Hip Interactive, filing for bankruptcy months later.	Kuju Entertainment	Hip Interactive
Classified: The Sentinel Crisis	Originally announced for PlayStation 2 and Xbox, only the Xbox version saw release in 2005.	Torus Games	
The Chronicles of Riddick: Escape from Butcher Bay	A PlayStation 2 port of The Chronicles of Riddick: Escape from Butcher Bay (2004) was cancelled in order to devote resources to finishing the Xbox version.	Starbreeze Studios	
Daredevil: The Man Without Fear	A video game adaption of Marvel's Daredevil franchise was in development and scheduled for release on the Xbox and PlayStation 2 in early 2004. The player would control Daredevil himself in a third person beat em up, while the story was an adaption of the Elektra Lives Again storyline. The game experienced a troubled development cycle, including game engine and scope changes, and Sony making requests to implement Tony Hawk's Pro Skater-styled grinding gameplay mechanics. Marvel disapproved of the changes and state of the game, and cancelled it in 2004. An early playable build leaked onto the internet in 2023.	5,000 Ft Studios	Encore Inc
Dark Earth	A PlayStation 2 port of the PC game Dark Earth (1997) was in early development. Despite Sony and Konami both expressing interest in publishing the port, it was never released.	Kalisto Entertainment	
Dead Rush	Dead Rush was a planned hybrid of the racing and survival horror genres, following an amnesiac man during a zombie apocalypse. Announced at E3 2004 for PlayStation 2, GameCube, and Xbox, Activision confirmed the game's cancellation just two months later due to not meeting their internal standards.	Treyarch	Activision
Destroy All Humans! Big Willy Unleashed	Originally in development for the Wii, with PlayStation 2 and PSP version in development later, only the Wii version ever released. The PS2 version was cancelled due to THQ's financial issues at the time, while the PSP version was cancelled due to the development team's struggles with adapting the Wii game's controls to a PSP's controls.	Locomotive Games	THQ
Dexter's Laboratory: Extreme Robot Rumble	A fighting game based on the Dexter's Laboratory animated series was announced for PlayStation 2 and GameCube. Despite being shown at E3 2003, the game never saw release.	n-Space	BAM! Entertainment
Dino Crisis 3	While originally reported to be coming to PlayStation 2, Dino Crisis 3 (2003) released only on Xbox due to its greater processing power, with producer Hiroyuki Kobayashi calling the prospects of a PlayStation 2 version "impossible".	Capcom	Capcom
Dirty Harry	A video game continuing the story of the 1971 film Dirty Harry was announced in 2005, and was set to feature Clint Eastwood reprising his role as Harry Callahan. While planned to launch on multiple systems in 2007, including the PlayStation 2, the project was cancelled that year due to development issues.	Sensory Sweep Studios	Warner Bros. Interactive
The Dreamland Chronicles: Freedom Ridge	After development of The Dreamland Chronicles began in 1999, funding for the project was pulled in 2001 due to dissatisfaction with the game's graphics, and the game was fully cancelled following Virgin Interactive's sale to Interplay Entertainment and then Titus Interactive. The source code was then sold to Alter Interactive, who reworked it into the PC game UFO: Aftermath (2003).	Mythos Games	Virgin Interactive
Duke Nukem D-Day	Following their work on Duke Nukem: Time to Kill (1998) and Duke Nukem: Land of the Babes (2000), n-Space was set to develop a third Duke Nukem spinoff game, which would see Duke sent back in time to influence major events during World War II. Planned for release in 2001, the game was reported as cancelled late in the year due to financial troubles at n-Space, with a port of Duke Nukem Forever intended to be released in its place, though that also never saw release. A prototype of the game was discovered in 2025.	n-Space	Rockstar Games
Duke Nukem Forever	The game was reported to be in development for PlayStation 2 in December 2001. However, the game was delayed well outside of the PS2's lifespan, not releasing until 2011 on PlayStation 3, Xbox 360, and Windows.	3D Realms	Take Two Interactive
Dungeons & Dragons: Heroes	Originally announced at E3 2002 for release on GameCube, PlayStation 2, and Xbox, Atari later announced at E3 2003 that the game would now be an Xbox exclusive release.	Atari Interactive Hunt Valley Studio	Atari
Ecks vs. Sever	A first person shooter based on the 2002 film Ballistic: Ecks vs. Sever was announced at E3 of that year. However, the game was ultimately never released, presumably due to the film's poor reception.	Zombie Studios	BAM! Entertainment
Emergency Mayhem	Initially announced at E3 2005, Emergency Mayhem was cancelled a few months later as a result of Acclaim Entertainment filing for bankruptcy. The rights to the game were later acquired by Codemasters, who completed and released it for the Wii in 2008.	Acclaim Studios Cheltenham	Acclaim Entertainment
Far Cry Instincts	Announced for the GameCube, PlayStation 2, and Xbox, only the Xbox version was released.	Ubisoft Montreal	Ubisoft
Final Fantasy XIII	Development of Final Fantasy XIII (2009) initially began on the PlayStation 2, but the project shifted development to PlayStation 3 in May 2005 following the release of the Final Fantasy VII tech demo.	Square Enix	Square Enix
Foodfight!	A 3D platformer based on the animated film Foodfight! was being developed for Wii, PlayStation 2, Xbox, and Nintendo DS. The game began development in 2004 and was publicly shown at E3 2006. However, due to the film's repeated delays and troubled production cycle, the decision was made to cancel the game in 2008, four years before the film would eventually be released.	Cat Daddy Games	Global Star Software
The Four Horsemen of the Apocalypse	Announced for GameCube, PlayStation 2, Xbox, and Windows, the game was cancelled when 3DO went bankrupt in 2003. Reports of reviving the project arose in 2004, but the game never released on any platform.	3DO	Stan Winston
FX Racing	A racing game announced for GameCube, PlayStation 2, and Xbox. It was scheduled for release in early 2004, but never ended up releasing in any capacity. It was planned to feature 30 cars and 18 different courses.	Milestone	
Galidor: Defenders of the Outer Dimension	A video game adaptation of the Galidor: Defenders of the Outer Dimension TV series, itself based on the Lego Galidor toyline, was announced for release on Game Boy Advance, GameCube, PlayStation 2, and Windows. While the GBA version launched in 2002, the other versions were delayed to a planned September 2003 release date before being cancelled due to the underperformance of the Galidor franchise and the developer Asylum Entertainment's financial issues.	Asylum Entertainment	Electronic Arts
Gold and Glory: The Road to El Dorado	A video game adaptation of the 2001 film The Road to El Dorado was announced for the PlayStation, Dreamcast, Game Boy Color, GameCube, PlayStation 2, and Windows, though only the PS1, GBC and Windows versions ever materialized.	Revolution Software	Ubisoft
Ice Nine	Originally an adaptation of the 2003 film The Recruit, the game's title was changed and references to the film were removed. The game was intended to release on PlayStation 2 and Game Boy Advance, but only the Game Boy Advance version saw release.	Torus Games	
Iceman	The first and only game announced by Datura Studios, a company founded by former Infogrames employees. Announced as a local multiplayer game for the GameCube, PlayStation 2, Xbox, and Windows, the game was roughly 80% completed, but Datura was unable to find a publisher, resulting in the company's closure.	Datura Studios	
Iron Soldier 3+	An enhanced port of Iron Soldier 3 (2000) was planned for PlayStation 2, Xbox, and Windows, but never released.	Eclipse Software Design	
Jet Moto: SOLAR	A fourth entry in the Jet Moto series, set hundreds of years in the future, was cancelled before being officially announced. The game's existence would later become known through concept art shared by one of the game's artists.	RedZone Interactive	Sony Computer Entertainment
Jimmy White's Cueball World	Initially announced at E3 2001 for PlayStation 2, Xbox, and Windows, only the PC version was released.	Awesome Developments	Virgin Interactive
Jurassic Park: Survival	An action adventure game loosely inspired by the 2001 film Jurassic Park III was planned for release on PlayStation 2 and Xbox alongside the film, but never materialized.	Savage Entertainment	Konami
Justice League: Injustice for All	Released for Game Boy Advance in 2002, a console version was also planned forPlayStation 2, Xbox, and GameCube, but never released.	Midway Games	Midway Games
Knights of Utu	Not publicly announced or generally known about until an Axios retrospective story in 2022. A game centered around aerial combat in an original fantasy world. Originally pitched under the name Knights of Utu for the PlayStation 2 in 2000, and when the developers decided to change the platform to Xbox, it went under the name Archipelago prior to arriving on its final title. The game was in development until early 2022, and had been intended to release within a year of the Xbox's launch. The game was cancelled by Phil Spencer after Microsoft became unhappy that the game was falling behind its aggressive development time tables. Parts of the game were up and running at the time of its cancellation, though many parts of its scope and scale had still not been decided upon.	Totally Games	
Lamborghini	Announced in 2002 for GameCube, PS2, and Xbox, the game was cancelled for all platforms in 2003 after Rage Software went out of business. Some aspect of the game were later used in the development of the Juiced series of racing games. A brief demo was released for Xbox in early 2003 prior to its cancellation, and an early prototype build of the game leaked in 2022.	Rage Software	Majesco Entertainment
The Lost	First announced in 2000, The Lost was a survival horror game loosely inspired by Dante's Inferno. It was the debut game by Irrational Games and was planned for a 2002 release on PlayStation 2 and Xbox, but development and legal issues prevented it from releasing. The rights to the game were later acquired by FXLabs, who retooled the game and released it for Windows in 2009 under the name Agni: Queen of Darkness.	Irrational Games	Crave Entertainment
Mafia II	When production began in 2004, the game was intended to be released on PlayStation 2 and Xbox, and would run on a game engine licensed from a third party. However, the engine's developer went out of business the following year, forcing the team to create its own proprietary engine. As a result, production shifted to PlayStation 3 and Xbox 360, where it released in 2010.	Illusion Softworks	2K
Mary-Kate and Ashley in Action!	A video game adaptation of the cartoon of the name starring popular twin duo Mary-Kate and Ashley Olsen was reported to have been in the works for a 2003 release for the GameCube, PlayStation 2, and Game Boy Advance. The game was never officially announced, only being revealed in a March 2004 lawsuit that the Olsen twins filed against Acclaim over unpaid royalties, with IGN and GameSpot reporting that the game's cancellation was what led to the partnership between Acclaim Entertainment and the girls' company Dualstar falling apart.	n-Space	Acclaim Entertainment
Medal of Honor: Airborne	Originally announced as a cross-generational title that would have two versions: a full-fledged HD version on PlayStation 3, Xbox 360, and PC platforms, and a second, scaled back version developed for the less powerful hardware of the Wii, PlayStation 2, and Xbox. The scaled back version was cancelled for all three platforms, PS2 included.	EA Los Angeles	Electronic Arts
The Movies	When The Movies (2005) was first announced, it was also stated that console versions were in development for PlayStation 2, Xbox, and GameCube. However, these console ports were all cancelled in 2006 due to the underperformance of the game on PC.	Lionhead Studios	Activision
Ninja Gaiden	Ninja Gaiden (2004) was planned to be released as a launch title for the PlayStation 2. However, upon receiving Xbox development kits, director Tomonobu Itagaki found the system to be a better fit for the game, and it became an Xbox exclusive.	Team Ninja	Tecmo
The Nomad Soul	A PlayStation 2 version of The Nomad Soul (1999) was cancelled during development.	Quantic Dream	Eidos Interactive
Oddworld: Munch's Oddysee	Development initially began for the PlayStation 2, but later released only on Xbox in 2001.	Oddworld Inhabitants	GT Interactive
Painkiller: Hell Wars	After its initial 2004 PC release, the game was announced for the PSP, PlayStation 2 and the original Xbox. While a playable version of the PSP version was present at E3 2006, only the Xbox version ever released.	People Can Fly	DreamCatcher Interactive
Picassio	Announced for the GameCube and PS2 as a non-violent action game about an art thief, developer Promethean Designs was unable to find a publisher, and the company went bankrupt before the game could be released.	Promethean Designs	
Pirates of the Caribbean	Originally announced for PlayStation 2, Xbox, and Windows, only the PS2 version went unreleased.	Akella	Bethesda Softworks
Poncotsu Roman Daikatsugeki Bumpy Trot 2	A sequel to Steambot Chronicles (2005) was initially announced for PlayStation 2 in 2006 before shifting development to PlayStation 3 the following year. After missing a planned 2008 release date, no new updates on the game emerged until 2011, when it was announced that the game had been cancelled following the 2011 Tōhoku earthquake and tsunami.	Irem	
Rainy Woods	The survival horror game Rainy Woods was initially prototyped for the PlayStation 2 beginning in September 2004 before development moved to the PlayStation 3 and Xbox 360 in March 2006. The project was cancelled in 2007 before later being reworked and ultimately released as Deadly Premonition (2010).	Access Games	Marvelous Entertainment
Road to Sunday	A game that combined American Football with aspects of a story-driven fighting game. It was announced the PSP and PlayStation 2 and presented at E3 2005 in June, but was cancelled by the following month. Sony, its publisher, cited not making their internal quality standards, as the reason for its cancellation.	San Diego Studio	Sony Computer Entertainment
Sabotage 1943	First announced in 2003 as Sabotage 1943 and later just Sabotage for the PlayStation 2, original Xbox, and PC platforms, the game went through years of development issues and publisher and licensing changes until it was renamed Velvet Assassin and released only on the Xbox 360 and PC by publisher SouthPeak Games.	Replay Studios	
The Settlers V	The fifth entry in The Settlers series was announced for PC and consoles, but only the PC version was released under the name The Settlers: Heritage of Kings (2004).	Blue Byte	Ubisoft
Shaun Palmer's Pro Snowboarder 2	A sequel to Shaun Palmer's Pro Snowboarder (2001) was announced for the PlayStation 2, original Xbox, Game Boy Advance, and the GameCube in 2002, but was cancelled on all platforms the following year due to publisher Activision's poor financial performance at the time.	Treyarch	Activision
Shenmue	Sega created ports of Shenmue (1999) for PlayStation 2 and Xbox, but these went unreleased. The programmer Makoto Wada said this was due to problems with the product placement contract, which only covered the Dreamcast version.	Sega AM2	Sega
Shrek	An updated port of Shrek (2001) was announced for GameCube and PlayStation 2, but only the GameCube version was released as Shrek Extra Large before TDK was acquired by Take-Two Interactive in 2003.	Digital Illusions Canada	TDK Mediactive
Skies of Arcadia	A PlayStation 2 port of Skies of Arcadia (2000) was cancelled in 2002 in favor of focusing on a port for the GameCube, which was released later that year under the name Skies of Arcadia Legends.	Overworks	Sega
Sonic Extreme	A skateboarding game in the vein of Tony Hawk's Pro Skater for the Sonic the Hedgehog franchise was concepted by Vision Scape Interactive after they finished their support work for Sonic Heroes (2003). A demo was created to pitch to Sega; while Yuji Naka reportedly supported it, Sega rejected the pitch, instead creating a hoverboard racing game Sonic Riders (2006) internally. Extreme had not been publicly known about until a playable version of the pitch demo leaked onto the internet in 2012.	Vision Scape Interactive	Sega
SpaceStationSim	A PlayStation 2 port of SpaceStationSim (2006) was announced by NASA, but never released.	Vision Videogames	
Spawn: In the Demon's Hand	A port of Spawn: In the Demon's Hand (2000) was planned for PlayStation 2 but failed to materialize.	Capcom	Capcom
StarCraft: Ghost	Announced in 2002 for the GameCube, PlayStation 2, and Xbox, the game experienced a lengthy and troubled development cycle, resulting in all versions of the game being cancelled between 2005 and 2006. While never officially released, some content from early builds of the game leaked onto the internet in 2020.	Blizzard Entertainment	
Stargate SG-1: The Alliance	MGM announced a video game based on the television series Stargate SG-1 in 2003 for the Xbox, Windows, and PlayStation 2. The game was to be developed by Peception Pty and published by JoWooD in Europe and Namco Hometek in North America. In August 2005, JoWood announced they had terminated the project, citing a lack of faith in the game's quality. Perception asserted that the project was not cancelled, as they retained the rights to the Stargate license and not JoWooD. The developer then pursued legal action against JoWooD for breach of contract, with Namco set to take on all publishing duties. Perception would continue to develop the game until 2006, when they confirmed the game's cancellation via a post on their forums.	Perception Pty	JoWooD/Namco Hometek
Super Duper Sumos	A PlayStation 2 game based on the Super Duper Sumos animated series was announced but never released.	Midway Games	
Symphony of the Light	Initially beginning development for Dreamcast, the target platform changed to PlayStation 2 in April 2000 before Microsoft made an offer the following September to publish the game as a console exclusive for Xbox, for which it eventually released as Sudeki (2004).	Climax Studios	
Tiny Toon Adventures: Defenders of the Universe	A fighting game based on the Tiny Toon Adventures animated series was announced in 2001, and would have featured similar gameplay mechanics to developer Treasure's previous fighting game, Rakugaki Showtime (1999). While the game was completed and scheduled for a July 2002 release on GameCube and PlayStation 2, it experienced multiple delays and was ultimately never released for either platform, allegedly due to publisher Conspiracy Entertainment experiencing financial difficulties at the time. A near-final prototype of the PS2 version was later found and released onto the internet in 2009.	Treasure	Conspiracy Entertainment
Tremors: The Game	Originally announced for the GameCube, PlayStation 2, Xbox, and Windows in 2002, the game was quietly cancelled later that year following the purchase of Rock Solid Studios by Starbreeze Studios.	Rock Solid Studios	Conspiracy Entertainment
Vectorman	A reboot of the Vectorman series was demonstrated at E3 2003, with plans to release the game the following year. Rather than a 2D platformer like previous series entries, the new Vectorman was a third person shooter with some platforming elements. However, the game was cancelled shortly after its E3 appearance due to a restructuring at Sega, with the cancellation being publicly confirmed the following November.	Pseudo Interactive	Sega
WCW Mayhem 2	A sequel to WCW Mayhem (1999) was announced in 2000, but was cancelled in 2001 as a result of WCW being acquired by WWF.	AKI Corporation	Electronic Arts
Zombie Revenge	A PlayStation 2 port of Zombie Revenge (1999) was announced but never released	Sega	Acclaim Entertainment
