= Zack Hemsey =

American musician (born 1983)

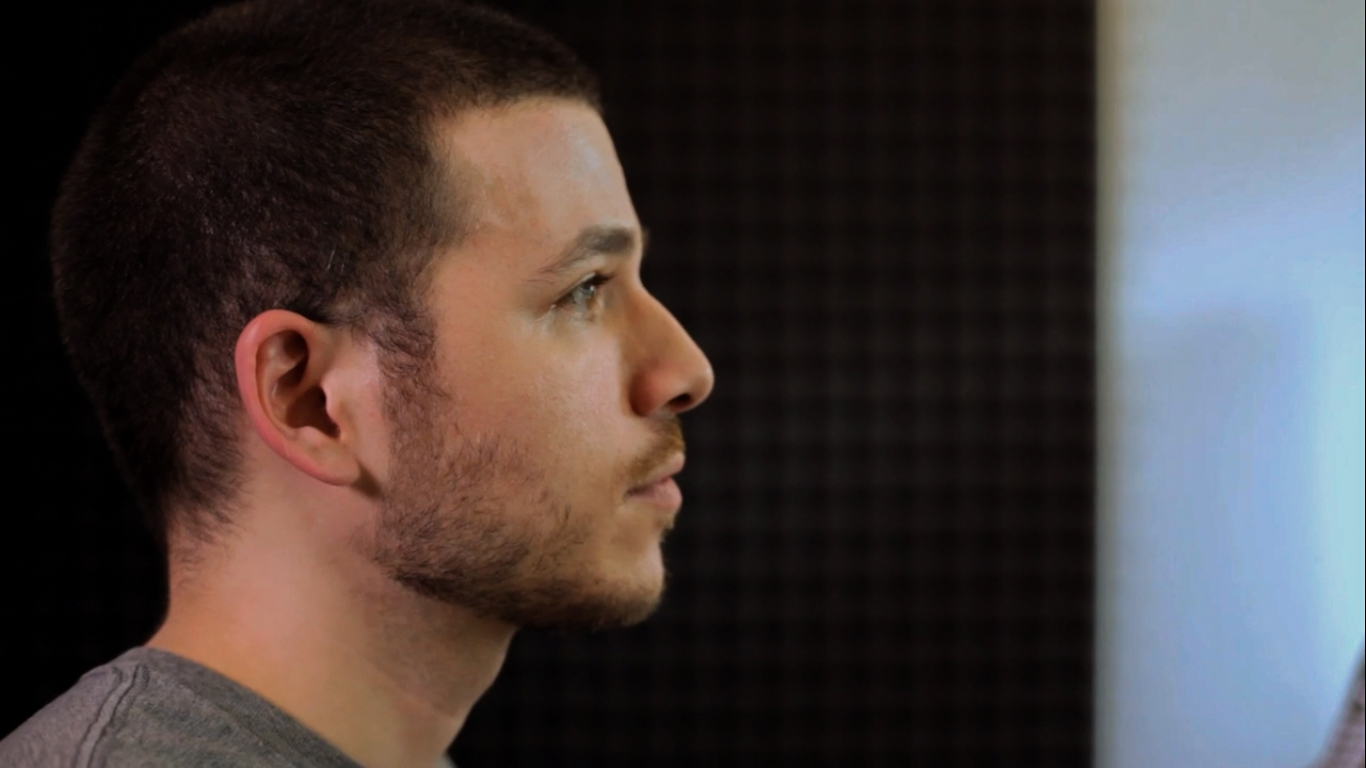
- Zack Hemsey in 2010

Background information
- Born: May 30, 1983 (age 42) New Jersey, United States
- Genres: Rap rock; electronica; hip hop; film score; alternative rock; trailer music; trip hop
- Occupation(s): Composer, songwriter, musician, record producer, film director, film producer
- Years active: 2006–present
- Labels: Independent
- Website: zackhemsey.com

Zack Hemsey (born May 30, 1983) is an American composer, songwriter, and filmmaker best known for the use of his music in movies and trailers.

== Personal life ==
Hemsey grew up in New Jersey with his older sister Tara. He graduated from Palisades Park High School in 2001, and studied music and philosophy at Rutgers University, graduating with a summa cum laude.

== Career ==
Hemsey began his career as the composer for an obscure hip-hop group called Nine Leaves, where he was one of five lyricists. He began his solo career in 2010 with the release of his first album "Empty Room" and has continued to independently release his own music, which tends to combine elements of alternative hip-hop, alternative rock, classical orchestra, and/or world instrumentation.

His work "Mind Heist" was used in the film trailer for Inception as well as for the video game Madden NFL 12, and is occasionally used by the television series America's Got Talent. Hemsey's music has been featured in film trailers for The Town, Lincoln, 2 Guns, and others. His song "Vengeance" was prominently featured in the film The Equalizer, as well as in trailers for the second season of the HBO program Game of Thrones and the 21st Century Fox miniseries 24: Live Another Day; the latter aired during Fox Sports' U.S. TV broadcast of Super Bowl XLVIII.

In 2020, Hemsey made his directorial debut, in which he shot, produced, and edited a feature-length documentary titled BIRTH. The film explores the psychology of labor and the birth experience, through the lens of an unmedicated homebirth. The film was released online worldwide on the iTunes Store and Vimeo OnDemand.

Hemsey has written articles on a variety of subject matter, which he has published on his blog "Thoughts & Ramblings." Topics have included the difference between artists and entertainers, mixed martial arts, the birth of his children, the music industry, and a research paper on a rare GBS infection that can occur in newborn babies.

== Discography ==
Albums

- "Empty Room" (March 2010)
- "The Way" (June 2011)
- "RONIN" (April 2013)
- "NOMAD" (November 2016)
- "GOLIATH (Original Motion Picture Soundtrack to a Film That Doesn't Exist)" (March 2018)

EPs

- "Mind Heist" (May 2011)
- "The Candidate (Original Motion Picture Soundtrack)" (October 2011)
- "That Which You Seek" (January 2012)

Singles

- "Empty Room (Trailer Version)" (June 2010)
- "R.E.F. (Warrior's Lullabye)" (September 2010)
- "Lifespan (Resurrection)" (March 2011)
- "Revelations (Remix)" (March 2011)
- "Changeling (New Beginnings)" (March 2011)
- "The Home of a People" (June 2012)
- "Finding Home" (June 2012)

Bonus Content

- "Empty Room (The Instrumentals)" (March 2010)
- "The Way (Bonus Disk)" (June 2011)
- "RONIN (Instrumentals)" (April 2014)
- "NOMAD (Instrumentals)" (January 2017)

Music Videos

- "Yesterday" (October 2008)
- "Waiting Between Worlds" (April 2012)

Albums (under Nine Leaves)

- "Nine Leaves" (January 2006)
- "Peace In Death" (August 2008)
- "Volume One (1999-2001)" (August 2022)
- "Volume Two (2002-2003)" (August 2022)
- "Volume Three (2004-2005)" (August 2022)
- "Volume Four (2006-2008)" (August 2022)

== Music credits in Trailer / Film ==
Film	Song title	Year
Inception	"Mind Heist"	2010
The Town	"Redemption"	2010
Trust	"Changeling"	2010
Falling Skies	"See What I've Become"	2011
Game of Thrones	"Vengeance"	2012
Transformers: Fall of Cybertron	"The Way"	2012
Lincoln	"End of an Era"	2012
Parade's End	"Facing Demons"	2013
G.I. Joe: Retaliation	"See What I've Become"	2013
All Is Lost	"Fade Away"	2013
Jack Ryan: Shadow Recruit	"Vengeance"	2013
24: Live Another Day	"Vengeance"	2014
The Riot Club	"Vengeance"	2014
The Equalizer	"Vengeance"	2014
The Boy Next Door	"End of an Era"	2015
A Most Violent Year	"The Way"	2015
The Divergent Series: Insurgent	"See What I've Become"	2015
Mr. Robot	"Nice to Meet Me"	2016
Titanfall 2	"See What I've Become"	2016
UFC 220: Miocic vs Ngannou	"Don't Get In My Way"	2017
A Discovery of Witches	"The Way"	2018
1917	"The Way"	2019
The Last Dance	"Vengeance"	2020
Fast & Furious 9	"The Runner"	2021
Tom Clancy's Ghost Recon Frontline	"Don't Get In My Way"	2021

== See also ==
- Alternative hip hop
- Alternative rock
- Film score
- Trailer music
- Trip hop
- Hans Zimmer
