= List of cancelled PlayStation 4 games =

The following games were initially announced as PlayStation 4 titles, but were subsequently cancelled or postponed indefinitely by developers or publishers.

List of cancelled PlayStation 4 games
Title(s)	Notes/Reasons	Developer	Publisher
Bombshell	In 2014, Interceptor Entertainment and 3D Realms announced Duke Nukem: Mass Destruction, an isometric action role-playing spinoff of the Duke Nukem series for PlayStation 4 and PC. Though intended for release early in the year, Gearbox Software, who had acquired the Duke Nukem IP from 3D Realms in 2010, filed a lawsuit alleging the game was in violation of their copyright. Interceptor and 3D Realms chose to salvage the work done on the game by retooling it into an original IP, which eventually released only on PC as Bombshell (2016).	Interceptor Entertainment	3D Realms
Deep Down	Deep Down was announced in 2013 alongside Capcom's new "Panta Rhei" game engine, designed specifically for the PlayStation 4. With Yoshinori Ono's departure from Capcom in 2020, the release status of Deep Down is publicly unknown. In September 2021, former chairman of SIE Worldwide Studios Shawn Layden stated that he had "no idea" what happened to Deep Down but says that other team members might pick up the game further to develop.	Capcom Online Games	Capcom
Delta Force	Originally the game was going to release for the PS4 and Xbox One, alongside PS5 and Xbox Series X/S. Only the PS5 and Xbox Series X/S version were released, while the PS4 and Xbox One version were never released for unknown reasons.	TiMi J3 Studio	TiMi Studio Group; Garena
EverQuest Next	2016	Daybreak Game Company	Daybreak Game Company
Gotham Knights	Gotham Knights was originally announced for PS5, PS4, Windows, Xbox One, and Xbox Series X/S. The PlayStation 5 and Xbox Series X/S Versions were released in 2022 while the PlayStation 4 and Xbox One version were cancelled because WB Games Montréal thought it was better off focusing efforts to deliver a polished experience on PlayStation 5 and Xbox Series X/S.	WB Games Montréal	Warner Bros. Interactive Entertainment
Human Element	Starting development in 2012 and being announced at The Game Awards in 2014, the game was an ambitious first person shooter by Robert Bowling, who had previously worked on Call of Duty titles. Announced for the Wii U, PlayStation 4, Xbox One, and PC platforms, development was put on hiatus before being cancelled in early 2015 due to the inability to fund the game and subsequent closure of developer Robotoki.	Robotoki	
Hyenas	Hyenas was announced in 2022 as part of IGN's Summer of Gaming Event. It was going to be a FPS game for Windows, PS4, PS5, Xbox One, Xbox Series X/S and was going to be a free-to-play similar to Fortnite and Apex Legends. In early August 2023, Sega executives publicly called Hyenas' development "challenging", raising the possibility it would be cancelled, and stated they would look at "adjusting" the game's business model, possibly to free-to-play. Its development was halted by Sega on September 28, 2023 along with multiple other unannounced games, due to "lower profitability of the European region".	Creative Assembly	Sega
Killing Bites	2016	Nex Entertainment	
Legacy of Kain: Dead Sun	2012	Climax Studios	Square Enix Europe
Lego James Bond	In 2016, TT Games pitched a new entry in their long running line of Lego games, this time based on the James Bond film franchise. The pitch was rejected due to the films' adult themes and level of violence being too extreme for the Lego brand's family-friendly demographic. A trailer for the game was later leaked in 2024.	TT Games	Warner Bros. Interactive Entertainment
Overkill's The Walking Dead	2019	Overkill Software	Starbreeze Studios
Paragon	2018	Epic Games	Epic Games
Project Ragtag	2017	Visceral Games	Electronic Arts
Project Rap Rabbit	2017	NanaOn-Sha, iNiS	PQube
Silent Hills	2015	Kojima Productions	Konami
Tom Clancy's Ghost Recon Frontline	A new battle royale entry in the Ghost Recon series was announced back in October 2021 for PC, PlayStation 4, PlayStation 5, Xbox One, Xbox Series X/S, and Google Stadia. Nine months later, Ubisoft cancelled the game due to negative feedback received during the game's announcement and its closed beta test.	Ubisoft Bucharest; Ubisoft Kyiv	Ubisoft
Tom Clancy's Rainbow 6: Patriots	A new entry in the Tom Clancy's Rainbow Six series was announced in 2011 for Xbox 360, PlayStation 3, and PC via a trailer with pre-rendered target footage. In 2013, it was announced that the game had shifted to the next generation of consoles, though the project experienced several issues in the transition and needed to be rebooted. By 2014, it had been confirmed that Patriots had been cancelled and that the series would be rebooted with Tom Clancy's Rainbow Six: Siege (2015).	Ubisoft Montreal, Red Storm Entertainment, Ubisoft Toronto	Ubisoft
Uppers	2020	Bullets	Marvelous
Wild	2024	Wild Sheep Studio	Sony Interactive Entertainment
Whore of the Orient	2016	KMM Interactive Entertainment	Warner Bros. Interactive Entertainment
Woolfe: The Red Hood Diaries	2015	GriN Gamestudio	GriN Gamestudio
