= Boppin' =

1991 video game

- Amiga Cover art
- Developer: Accursed Toys
- Publishers: Karmasoft (Amiga); Apogee (MS-DOS)
- Designer: Jennifer Diane Reitz
- Programmer: Stephen P. Lepisto
- Artist: Chuck Jones
- Composers: Andrew J. Lepisto (music); Jim Dose (sound)
- Platforms: Amiga, MS-DOS, Windows
- Release: 1991: Amiga; November 15, 1994: MS-DOS; 2005: Windows
- Genre: Puzzle
- Modes: Single-player, multiplayer

Boppin' is a puzzle video game created by Jennifer Diane Reitz in 1991, developed under the company name Accursed Toys and published by Karmasoft for the Amiga computer. Around that time Karmasoft held a level design contest. The game sold poorly with 284 copies, so Jennifer got it republished by Apogee Software (now known as 3D Realms) with up to 256 colors on screen. Due to mature content containing blood and seppuku, Apogee included a disclaimer in the manual that the game contained potentially offensive imagery, as well as part of a manifesto from Accursed Toys stating that their games were produced for an audience of adult gamers who are mostly 25 and older.

In January 2026, the game was updated to work for Windows 10 and up.

== Plot ==
The game takes place in a multiverse where fictional universes exist mostly from the minds and dreams of people. One such universe called Arcapaedia is inhabited by video game characters, especially the two stick-figured, triangle-headed Yeet and Boik. However, all the arcade games have been diminished due to the lack of bad guys and villains taken away by the puritanical Hunnybunz Family. Since heroes and good guys are not able to rescue the missing characters, Yeet and Boik having a neutral alignment set off to thwart Hunnybunz, his wife, and his lovechild's intentions.

== Gameplay ==
Levels are made up of blocks, elevators, refractors, prizes, and two starting points. The game involves throwing blocks picked up from the starting point (one for each player in two-player games, only one is used in one-player) at blocks of the same type which are already in the levels. The blocks are thrown at 45 degree angles and can be bounced off refractors placed in strategic parts of the levels. The blocks already in the level can be pushed around and bonus items can be collected for additional points, extra lives and extra credits. Each credit starts the player with five lives. The player can have a maximum amount of ten lives. If the player runs out of lives and credits, the game is over.

If a thrown block hits a wall/floor, flies off the level or hits a block of another type, then the block is destroyed and the player loses a life. If a thrown block goes through a randomly chosen space on the level called the mystery spot, the screen will turn a gold shade and the player's score points earned are multiplied by 10% for the duration. If a thrown block, when it collides with the blocks of the same type, makes a special shape - a 3x2 square, a 3x3 cross shape, a 3x3 hollow square and a 3x3 square - then a monster is freed from the blocks. At the end of a level, bonus points are awarded for freed monsters. The two-player mode is more or less the same as the single-player mode but is basically a competition for the highest score.

In every multiple 40th level, the gameplay changes slightly as a boss level, where the player has to launch weapon-like throwing blocks at the Hunnybunz opponent. The damage done by each throwing block is determined by the high score the player achieved. After sufficient damage has been done to the opponent, the episode is won. Getting touched by the opponent costs the player one life.

Boppin' is notable for its odd tone; in the original 1.0 version of the game, the Accursed Toys logo was the company's original "Deady Bear" logo, a teddy bear stabbed with a kitchen knife and bleeding, and upon losing a life, Yeet and Boik would commit suicide by shooting themselves in the mouth and seppuku respectively. These assets were replaced in the 1.1 version, and were only accessible by using the "blood" command-line parameter. The game's credits screen would also contain lengthy manifestos from both authors about their motivations behind this.

== Release ==
The Amiga version of the game had 150 levels, a level editor, a larger menu during gameplay, its own copy protection and three levels of difficulty.

When the DOS version was released on November 15, 1994 it had updated audio, levels and graphics and came in four releases. The first release was the shareware version which had only 26 levels that made up the first episode. The second release was titled Basic Boppin' which had two episodes with 80 levels in all (the first 26 are different from the Shareware version). The third release released on December 9, 1994 was titled Super Boppin', came on a CD, had all four episodes with 160 levels plus a level editor and all violent features censored. The final release released on August 19, 2005 was freeware simply titled Boppin', had all the features of the third release and was the very release ported to Windows.

== Reception ==
A review on Amazing Computer highlighted that the game had a number of video game references including Super Mario.
