= List of cancelled PC games =

Cancelled games Microsoft Windows

This is a list of video games that were in development only for the Windows operating system but were cancelled.

== Games ==
There are currently 18 games on this list. (Note: This number is always up to date by this script.)

List of cancelled Windows games
Title(s)	Notes/Reasons	Developer(s)	Publisher(s)
Amen: The Awakening	The game was cancelled in January 2000. This was due to Amen being behind schedule, and the development resources used for the game were put to better use working on existing and established franchises.	Cavedog Entertainment	GT Interactive
Ashes of Creation	Originally announced in 2016, the game was cancelled in 2026 due to the closure of Intrepid Studios.	Intrepid Studios	Intrepid Studios
Baldur's Gate III: The Black Hound	The game was cancelled in 2003.	Black Isle Studios	Interplay Entertainment
Black Isle's Torn	Originally announced during GDC 2001, the game was canceled because it was not going to be done in time to get Interplay the revenue the company needed to continue operations.	Black Isle Studios	Interplay Entertainment
Breakaway	The game was cancelled in March 2018 due to the development team focusing on other ideas.	Amazon Games Orange County	Amazon Game Studios
Command & Conquer	In 2013, Electronic Arts ceased development of Command & Conquer and shut down Victory Games, citing negative feedback over the economy-based experience as a reason.	Victory Games	Electronic Arts
Dawngate	In 2014, Electronic Arts cancelled the development of Dawngate, due to the beta not progressing well as the developers hoped.	Waystone Games	Electronic Arts
Dawntide	The game was cancelled by Working As Intended due to “unexpected financial difficulties".	Working As Intended	
Decksplash	After not reaching its intended goal of 100,000 players during a Steam free week, Bossa Studios stopped development on the game.	Bossa Studios	Bossa Studios
Dragon Empires	Codemasters discontinued development on Dragon Empires, due to "technical issues".	Codemasters	Codemasters
Dungeon Keeper 3	In 2000, Bullfrog Productions stopped development of Dungeon Keeper 3, citing "development on other projects" as the reason.	Bullfrog Productions	Electronic Arts
Earthblade	Development on the game was stopped due to dispute over intellectual property rights of Celeste and struggles with development as some of the reasons.	Extremely OK Games	Extremely OK Games
East vs. West – A Hearts of Iron Game	The game never materialized due to multiple delays.	BL-Logic	Paradox Interactive
Fallen Age	Netamin stopped development of Fallen Age in July 2001, citing creative differences with their partners in Korea as reasons.	Netamin	SK Corp
Skip Barber Racing	Originally announced in April 1999, the project never materialized due to a lack of interest from upper management, and the resources were then re-directed to other projects.	Bethesda Softworks	Bethesda Softworks
The Lady, the Mage and the Knight	The game never materialized due to financial problems between Larian and Attic and its publisher, Inforgrames.	Larian Studios	Attic Entertainment Software
The 10th Planet	According to Todd Howard, the game never made past pre-production.	Centropolis Entertainment; Bethesda Softworks	Bethesda Softworks
Third World	Development on the game stopped in January 2000 due to a lack of funding.	Redline Games	Activision
