= List of cancelled Game Boy games =

The Game Boy is a handheld video game console released by Nintendo in 1989. It was Nintendo's first portable game console, and enjoyed great success until being succeeded by the Game Boy Color (GBC) in 1998. During this time, several games being developed for the system were cancelled for reasons such as financial difficulties, poor market climate, and the forthcoming release of the GBC, with some games being moved to that system instead. Many of these games were not known about in detail or in any capacity until 2020, when ROM images of several game prototypes were leaked onto the internet as part of a larger Nintendo data leak. This list documents games that were confirmed to be announced or in development for the Game Boy at some point, but did not end up being released for it in any capacity.

== Games ==
There are currently 23 games on this list. (Note: This number is always up to date by this script.)

List of cancelled Game Boy games
Title(s)	Notes/reasons	Developer	Publisher
10-Pin Bowling	Originally announced for the original Game Boy, the game underwent further revisions and was released as a Game Boy Color-only game in 1999.	Morning Star Multimedia	Majesco
Akira	An adaptation of the 1988 anime film Akira was planned for release on Super NES, Genesis, and Sega CD in 1995, with Game Boy and Game Gear games based on the film also being considered. Gameplay and content varied wildly among versions, but disagreements in the direction of the games with THQ occurred and the game fell onto the backburner, never releasing for any system.	Tom Create	THQ
Armadillo Gaiden	A sequel to Armadillo (1991) was planned for release on Game Boy, but the game was cancelled and the work done on it was retooled into Ultraman Ball (1994).	IGS	IGS
Baby's Day Out	A video game adaptation of the 1994 film Baby's Day Out was announced for Game Boy, Super NES, and Genesis, and advertised on the film's VHS release. The game involved the player using a cursor to keep the film's baby out of trouble. Despite being far enough along for publications to receive review copies of the Genesis version in late 1994, no versions of the game were ever released. The few reviews that were published were generally not positive, citing slow and boring gameplay.	Designer Software	Hi Tech Expressions
Densetsu no Starfy	Early prototyping for the first entry in Tose's The Legendary Starfy series began on the Game Boy in 1995, but was put on hold before being resuming in 1998, moving the project to Game Boy Color. In 1999, the team was asked to shift development once again to the Game Boy Advance, for which it released in 2002.	TOSE	Nintendo
Diablo Junior	Following the release of Diablo II (2000), a team of developers at Blizzard Entertainment pitched a prequel to Diablo (1997) for Game Boy Advance. However, it was decided to move the project to the original Game Boy due to its larger install base. Concepts such as multiple connected versions with alternate playable characters were explored during development. Ultimately, the decision was made to cancel the project due to concerns about the game's commercial viability and the team's unfamiliarity with making games for Game Boy.	Blizzard South	Blizzard Entertainment
Edd the Duck	The video game Baby T-Rex (1993) was re-skinned by its developers to feature characters from several different licenses for release in different regions of the world, including We're Back! A Dinosaur's Story, Agro, and Bamse. One of these revisions, featuring UK puppet character Edd the Duck, was never released. A ROM of Edd the Duck would later be discovered as part of the 2020 Nintendo data leak.	Beam Software	
Elite	A demo for a Game Boy port of Elite (1984) was produced in 1994, but the project was never picked up. A ROM of the demo was later released online by Elite co-designer Ian Bell.	Hybrid Technology	
Hello Kitty Pocket Camera	A version of Nintendo's Game Boy Camera accessory themed after Sanrio's Hello Kitty franchise was in development, with various graphics and elements replaced with Hello Kitty characters. An advertisement for the device was packaged with the Pocket Hello Kitty, stating it would be released in December 1998 alongside the Hello Kitty Pocket Printer, a themed variant of the Game Boy Printer. However, neither accessory was ever released. A ROM of the Pocket Camera software would later be discovered as part of the 2020 Nintendo data leak.	Nintendo	Nintendo
Home Alone 2: Kevin's Dream / Bobby's World	A video game loosely based on the film Home Alone 2: Lost in New York, taking place in Kevin McCallister's dreams, was announced in May 1993 by Argonaut Games for SNES. This version never released, with the developers presuming it was due to the significant length of time between the releases of the film and the game. In January 1994, it was announced that the game would now be developed by Unexpected Development for Game Boy, with a late 1994 release date. Later that same year, the publisher decided that they no longer felt the Home Alone IP would be profitable, so the decision was made to retool the game into one based on the animated series Bobby's World. The new version featured the same premise, gameplay, and stages, but replaced all of the characters with those from Bobby's World. Ultimately, neither version of the Game Boy game was released, though ROMs of both versions would later be discovered as part of the 2020 Nintendo data leak.	Unexpected Development	THQ / Hi Tech Expressions
Hyouryuu Shounen Keith	An action RPG in the vein of The Legend of Zelda was featured in an issue of Famitsu magazine, stating it would be released in November 1990. However, the game never materialized in any capacity.		Sony Imagesoft
In-Fisherman Bass Hunter	A Game Boy counterpart to the Nintendo 64 game In-Fisherman Bass Hunter 64 (1999) was announced in 1998, but never saw release.	Tarantula Studios	Take-Two Interactive
Infogenius Productivity Pak: Berlitz Language Translator series	In September 1991, GameTek launched the Infogenius Productivity Pak line of applications, including Berlitz French Translator and Berlitz Spanish Translator, translation dictionaries based on the Berlitz Method of language learning. Additional Translator applications were planned for German, Italian, and Japanese, but were never released.	Imagineering	GameTek
John Madden Football	Ports of John Madden Football '93 (1992) for Game Boy and NES were scheduled for release by the end of 1993, to be published by Ubi Soft. However, both versions were ultimately cancelled. A ROM of the Game Boy version would later be discovered as part of the 2020 Nintendo data leak.	NMS Software	Ubi Soft
Peaky Blinder	A side-scrolling game involving the player controlling "Peaky", a literal amalgamation and personification of garbage, which aspires to overcome his life in the slums to become a respectable person in a nice house. The game featured a shapeshifting gameplay mechanic for fighting enemies. Announced for a wide variety of platforms - SNES, Game Boy, Game Gear, Sega CD, and Genesis, the game never released in any capacity for any platforms.		Sales Curve Interactive
Rap City / Rap Quest	A video game starring music artist Vanilla Ice was in development, though access to Ice's music was not included as part of the licensing deal. The game was later renamed from Rap City to Rap Quest, and Ice's likeness was removed due to his waning popularity. While Rap Quest was finished, it ultimately failed to materialize. A finished ROM would later be discovered as part of the 2020 Nintendo data leak.	Equilibrium	THQ
Spider-Man and Venom: Maximum Carnage	Originally announced for the Game Gear, Genesis, Master System, and Game Boy, only the Genesis version ever materialized.	Software Creations	Flying Edge
Sutte Hakkun GB	A port of Sutte Hakkun (1997) was developed for Game Boy and Game Boy Color, but was cancelled without ever being officially announced. ROMs of these ports would later be discovered as part of the 2020 Nintendo data leak.	Nintendo	Nintendo
Super Battletoads	A Game Boy port of the arcade game Battletoads (1994) was fully developed and set for release under the name Super Battletoads. However, due to the commercial failure of the arcade release, publisher Tradewest decided to cancel the Game Boy version.	Rare Inc.	Tradewest
Wily & Right no RockBoard: That's Paradise	A Game Boy port of the Famicom game Wily & Right no RockBoard: That's Paradise (1993) was developed for the Game Boy, but never saw release. A ROM of the cancelled version was later discovered as part of the 2020 Nintendo data leak.	Dual	Capcom
WorkBoy	The WorkBoy was an unreleased Game Boy add-on featuring a large keyboard that connected to the system via the link cable port. Using a proprietary piece of Game Boy software, users could use their Game Boy like a personal digital assistant, including tools such as a calendar, a notes application, a translator, a currency conversion calculator, and other similar functions. While shown at the 1992 Consumer Electronics Show and planned for release later that year, Fabtek president Frank Ballouz decided to cancel the accessory after a Game Boy price cut would have made the accessory more expensive than the system itself. Only one prototype of the WorkBoy is confirmed to exist, which is currently in Ballouz's possession. In 2020, video game historian Liam Robertson documented the WorkBoy's story in a video documentary, using Ballouz's prototype and a ROM of the software found in the 2020 Nintendo data leak to publicly exhibit the software's full functionality for the first time.	Source Research and Development	Fabtek / Nintendo
WWF WrestleMania	A Game Boy port of WWF WrestleMania (1989) was designed by John Pickford in 1990. However, this version was never released.	Zippo Games	Acclaim Entertainment
