= List of cancelled GameCube games =

The GameCube is a video game console released by Nintendo in 2001. After the decline in market share and loss of third party game developer support in the prior generation with the Nintendo 64, Nintendo worked to repair relationships with developers with the GameCube. While Nintendo's first party games generally sold well, many third party developed game sales lagged, leading Nintendo to work with third parties to help with publishing. While this helped, there were still many games cancelled for the platform, between pitches being rejected by Nintendo, third party support being pulled due to lack of sales, and Nintendo themselves pushing games off to their next platform, the Wii, which released in late 2006. This list documents games that were confirmed for the GameCube at some point, but did not end up being released for it in any capacity.

== Games ==
There are currently 96 games on this list. (Note: This number is always up to date by this script.)

List of cancelled GameCube games
Title(s)	Notes/Reasons	Developer	Publisher
12 Volt	A slot car racing game with the ability for the cars to shift lanes was announced in August 2004 for Xbox, PlayStation 2, GameCube and PC, but failed to materialize.	Sproing Interactive	
Alias	Originally announced in January 2003 for the GameCube, PlayStation 2, Xbox, and Windows, by June at E3 2003, the GameCube version had been dropped without explanation. Acclaim later announced they had dropped all software support for the GameCube due to slow sales of prior titles.	Acclaim Studios Cheltenham	Acclaim Entertainment
American Idol	A GameCube version of American Idol was announced, but never materialized.	Hothouse Creations	Codemasters
Barbie Horse Adventures: Wild Horse Rescue	A third entry in the Barbie Horse Adventures series of games was announced for GameCube, Xbox, and PlayStation 2, but the GameCube version never materialized.	Blitz Games	Vivendi Universal Games
Battlebots	A fighting game based on the Battlebots TV series was demonstrated at E3 2002. Players would be able to win in-game currency to buy parts, which could then be used to customize their bot. The game was also planned to feature 80 different pre-made bots, roughly half of which originated from the show, along with multiple arenas and four-player multiplayer support. Players could use a dual analog control scheme to operate each of a bot's treads individually, or an alternate simplified control scheme using only one analog stick. The game was scheduled for a November 2002 release on PlayStation 2 and GameCube, but failed to materialize, presumably due to the show's cancellation. A prototype of the game was later discovered in 2022.	Warthog Games	THQ
The Cat in the Hat	A GameCube version was announced, but the game only ended up releasing on PlayStation 2, Xbox, and Windows.	Magenta Software	Vivendi Universal Games
Car Combat/Thunder Rally	Announced as a vehicular combat game in the vein of Twisted Metal, the game was one of a few projects at Retro Studios cancelled during a massive corporate structuring, which resulted in much of the company instead focusing on development of Metroid Prime (2002).	Retro Studios	Nintendo
Celebrity Deathmatch	A GameCube version was slated, but was quietly cancelled shortly before release. A source close to development cited "programming issues" as the reason behind the decision.	Big Ape Productions	Gotham Games
Conker's Other Bad Day	A proposed direct sequel to Conker's Bad Fur Day (2001), development was halted when developer Rare was bought by Microsoft, opting to remake Bad Fur Day as Conker: Live & Reloaded (2005) on Xbox instead.	Rare	Nintendo
Untitled Contra game	In 2002, Konami's European branch announced their intention to bring a game from their Contra series to the GameCube, though no such game ever materialized.	Konami of Europe	Konami
Crash Twinsanity	The game released on PS2 and Xbox, but was cancelled for GameCube. IGN speculated it was due to poor sales of prior Vivendi Universal games on the platform.	Traveller's Tales	Vivendi Universal Games
Crazy Taxi 2	A GameCube and Xbox port of Crazy Taxi 2 (2001) was once reported to be in the planning stages in a 2001 IGN interview, but neither saw the light of day.	Hitmaker	Sega
Dead Phoenix	Part of the "Capcom Five" — a group of five major games announced by Capcom for the GameCube in late 2002 — the game was announced as cancelled by Capcom Japan in August 2003, becoming the only game of the five to not see release.	Capcom	Capcom
Dead Rush	Dead Rush was a planned hybrid of the racing and survival horror genres, following an amnesiac man during a zombie apocalypse. Announced at E3 2004 for PlayStation 2, GameCube, and Xbox, Activision confirmed the game's cancellation just two months later due to not meeting their internal standards.	Treyarch	Activision
Dexter's Laboratory: Extreme Robot Rumble	A fighting game based on the Dexter's Laboratory animated series was announced for PlayStation 2 and GameCube. Despite being shown at E3 2003, the game never saw release.	n-Space	BAM! Entertainment
Diddy Kong Racing Adventure	A pitch for a sequel to Diddy Kong Racing by third-party developer Climax Studios after Rare, the original game's developer, was bought by Microsoft. While some rough content was created, the pitch was not picked up by Nintendo, and development was cancelled.	Climax Studios	Nintendo
DK Bongo Blast	Originally announced at E3 2006 as one of Nintendo's final GameCube releases, and intended to use the DK Bongos as its primary controller, the game was delayed and development shifted to the Wii, where it released as Donkey Kong Barrel Blast (2007).	Paon	Nintendo
Donkey Kong Plus	A remake of the Game Boy game Donkey Kong (1994) was announced at E3 2002 for release on GameCube and Game Boy Advance. The two versions were said to have connectivity with one another, with players able to design levels on GBA and transfer them to GameCube for play on the television. The game was later heavily reworked and released only on Game Boy Advance as Mario vs. Donkey Kong (2004).	Nintendo Software Technology	Nintendo
Donkey Kong Racing	Announced as a sequel to Diddy Kong Racing at E3 2001, the game was cancelled in 2002 when developer Rare was bought by Nintendo competitor Microsoft, making them lose access to the Donkey Kong IP. Rare briefly attempted to rework the game on Xbox and later Xbox 360 as Sabreman Stampede, utilizing their Sabreman IP in place of Donkey Kong, but this game was also cancelled.	Rare	Nintendo
Driver 3	Announced at E3 2002 for the GameCube, PlayStation 2 and Xbox, the GameCube version was later cancelled in September 2003 so that the development team could focus on finishing and releasing the game on the other two consoles in 2004.	Reflections Interactive	Atari
Duke Nukem Forever	The game was announced for GameCube in May 2001. However, the game was delayed well outside of the GameCube's lifespan, not releasing until 2011 on PlayStation 3, Xbox 360, and Windows.	3D Realms	Take Two Interactive
Dungeons & Dragons: Heroes	Originally announced at E3 2002 for release on GameCube, PlayStation 2, and Xbox, Atari later announced at E3 2003 that the game would now be an Xbox exclusive release.	Atari Interactive Hunt Valley Studio	Atari, Inc.
E.T.: Search for Dragora	A GameCube-exclusive game based on E.T. the Extra-Terrestrial, in which E.T. would perform gardening and handiwork around a house. It was officially cancelled when its publisher went bankrupt prior to finishing the game.	Zed Two	NewKidCo
Untitled EarthBound sequel	While working on Monolith Soft's Baten Kaitos duology for the GameCube, the game's director Yasuyuki Honne pitched a new entry in the Mother series (known internationally as EarthBound) to Nintendo President Satoru Iwata, creating concept art that featured claymation-styled graphics. While Iwata approved, when series creator Shigesato Itoi declined to work on the project, the game idea was abandoned, though some of the graphical styles were implemented into a segment of Baten Kaitos Origins.		
Enclave	First announced for the Xbox, IGN reported that a GameCube version was in development after developer Starbreeze Studios announced they had received GameCube devkits from Enclave publisher Swing! Entertainment. However, only Xbox and Windows versions would release.	Starbreeze Studios	Swing! Entertainment
Family Guy Video Game!	A video game based on the animated series Family Guy was announced for GameCube, Xbox, PlayStation Portable, and PlayStation 2. The GameCube version was the only one not to release.	High Voltage Software	2K Games
Far Cry Instincts	Announced for the GameCube, PlayStation 2, and Xbox, only the Xbox version was released.	Ubisoft Montreal	Ubisoft
The Four Horsemen of the Apocalypse	Announced for GameCube, PlayStation 2, Xbox, and Windows, the game was cancelled when 3DO went bankrupt in 2003. Reports of reviving the project arose in 2004, but the game never released on any platform.	3DO	Stan Winston
Futurama	Announced for the GameCube, PlayStation 2, and Xbox, the GameCube version was cancelled in 2003 following sluggish sales for the platform.	Unique Development Studios	Vivendi Universal Games (NA); SCi Games (Europe)
FX Racing	A racing game announced for GameCube, PlayStation 2, and Xbox. It was scheduled for release in early 2004, but never ended up releasing in any capacity. It was planned to feature 30 cars and 18 different courses.	Milestone	
Galidor: Defenders of the Outer Dimension	A video game adaptation of the Galidor: Defenders of the Outer Dimension TV series, itself based on the Lego Galidor toyline, was announced for release on Game Boy Advance, GameCube, PlayStation 2, and Windows. While the GBA version launched in 2002, the other versions were delayed to a planned September 2003 release date, only to be cancelled due to the underperformance of the Galidor franchise and developer Asylum Entertainment's financial issues.	Asylum Entertainment	Electronic Arts, Lego Interactive
Galleon	Originally announced in 1999 for release on Dreamcast and PC, the game's lengthy seven year development period expanded well beyond the Dreamcast's lifespan. Development was moved to GameCube for a time, but then cancelled in favor of a release on the Xbox in 2004.	Confounding Factor	SCi Games/Atlus
Game Zero	A game announced by Zoonami, a company started by ex-Rare employee Martin Hollis. The game was never released in any capacity, and the company went out of business in the late 2000s.	Zoonami	Nintendo
Gladiator: Sword of Vengeance	Announced in January 2003 for the GameCube, PlayStation 2 and Xbox, the GameCube version was not present alongside the other versions at E3 2003, with Acclaim confirming its cancellation at the event. The following month, the company announced that they had cancelled all GameCube games in development due to poor sales of their prior titles on the platform.	Acclaim Studios Manchester	Acclaim Entertainment
Golden Sun 3	Many reports from Japan and teases from developers at Camelot Soft alluded to releasing a Golden Sun game for the GameCube after the Golden Sun: The Lost Age (2002), though such a game never materialized. A third series entry would not be released until Golden Sun: Dark Dawn (2010) on Nintendo DS.	Camelot Software	Nintendo
Gold and Glory: The Road to El Dorado	A video game adaptation of the 2001 film The Road to El Dorado was announced for the PlayStation, Dreamcast, Game Boy Color, GameCube, PlayStation 2, and Windows, though only the PS1, GBC and Windows versions ever materialized.	Revolution Software	Ubisoft
Grabbed by the Ghoulies	The game started development on GameCube in 2000, but after developer Rare was bought by Nintendo competitor Microsoft, development was moved to the Xbox, where it released in 2003.	Rare	
Gravity Games Bike: Street Vert Dirt	While a GameCube version was mentioned in print ads, the game was only released for PlayStation 2 and Xbox.	Midway Studios San Diego	Midway Home Entertainment
Haven: Call of the King	The first of a trilogy of planned games, it was announced for GameCube, PlayStation 2, and Xbox. The game underwent a difficult development cycle, resulting in the GameCube and Xbox versions being cancelled to focus on the PS2 version. This version failed to reach sales targets, leading the remaining two games to be cancelled as well.	Traveller's Tales	Midway
He-Man: Defender of Grayskull	A video game adaption of the Masters of the Universe franchise was announced for GameCube, PlayStation 2, and Xbox in May 2003. Despite the finished game having been reviewed by Nintendo Power in 2004 the game went unpublished for unknown reasons. The PlayStation 2 version would eventually be released exclusively in Europe in 2005 by Midas Interactive Entertainment as a budget title.	Savage Entertainment	TDK Mediactive
Iceman	The first and only game announced by Datura Studios, a company founded by former Infogrames employees. Announced as a local multiplayer game for the GameCube, PlayStation 2, Xbox, and Windows, the game was roughly 80% completed, but Datura was unable to find a publisher, resulting in the company's closure.	Datura Studios	
Island Xtreme Stunts	The third entry in the Lego Island series was initially reported to be releasing on the GameCube, PlayStation 2, PC, and Game Boy Advance. While most versions of the game released in 2002, the GameCube version was delayed until the following year, ultimately never releasing.	Silicon Dreams Studio	Electronic Arts, LEGO Interactive
Justice League: Injustice for All	Released for Game Boy Advance in 2002, a console version was also planned forPlayStation 2, Xbox, and GameCube, but never released.	Midway Games	Midway Games
Kameo	Shortly after completion of Donkey Kong 64, Rare started early work on Kameo for the Nintendo 64. By the time it was publicly announced at E3 2001, development had already shifted to the GameCube. In 2002, when Microsoft bought Rare, the GameCube version was cancelled and development was shifted to the Xbox. The game experienced a lengthy four year development period from there, leading to it being cancelled on Xbox in favor of releasing as a launch title for the Xbox 360 in 2005.	Rare	Nintendo
Kirby Adventure / Kirby platform games	Three different platformer games in the Kirby are known to have been cancelled for GameCube. One of them, known as Kirby Adventure, was announced at E3 2005, but development was difficult and eventually stalled when the development team couldn't find a way to balance the game to be played both in single player and with up to four players in local multiplayer. Two other games failed to meet Nintendo's internal quality standards and were cancelled before ever being publicly revealed: one involving challenging gameplay with movement in 3D space, and one that involved 2D gameplay with a "pop-up book" styled graphical style. Parts of all three games were used in the creation of the Wii game Kirby's Return to Dream Land (2011).	HAL Laboratory	Nintendo
Kirby's Tilt 'n' Tumble 2 / Roll-O-Rama	Announced at Nintendo Space World 2001 as a follow-up to Kirby Tilt 'n' Tumble (2000), the sequel would have involved connecting a Game Boy Advance as a controller for the GameCube in order to recreate the tilt gameplay controls of the original on a home console. It was later briefly shown as a generic game called Roll-O-Rama without any Kirby branding on it before being cancelled outright.	HAL Laboratory	Nintendo
Klonoa 2: Lunatea's Veil	Shortly after its 2001 PS2 release, a GameCube port was announced, but never materialized.	Namco	Namco
Knight N' Knight	A new entry in Sega's Clockwork Knight was announced in 2003, with the GameCube confirmed as its target platform. However, the game never materialized in any capacity.	Sega	Sega
Lamborghini	Announced in 2002 for GameCube, PS2, and Xbox, the game was cancelled for all platforms in 2003 after Rage Software went out of business. Some aspect of the game were later used in the development of the Juiced series of racing games. A brief demo was released for Xbox in early 2003 prior to its cancellation, and an early prototype build of the game leaked in 2022.	Rage Software	Majesco
The Legend of Zelda: The Wind Waker 2	Nintendo originally planned on releasing a follow-up to The Legend of Zelda: The Wind Waker (2002) on the GameCube, but cancelled work on the game in response to the game's lower sales in comparison to Ocarina of Time, with the team instead developing The Legend of Zelda: Twilight Princess (2006). The Wind Waker would later receive a direct sequel, The Legend of Zelda: Phantom Hourglass (2007), for the Nintendo DS.	Nintendo	Nintendo
Lego Bionicle: The Legend of Mata Nui	An action game based on the Bionicle toyline was planned for release in December 2001 for GameCube and Windows. Despite being 90% complete and heavily promoted, the game was cancelled due to quality control and development issues.	Saffire	Lego Software
Mace Griffin: Bounty Hunter	Initially announced as an Xbox and Windows exclusive, ports for the PlayStation 2 and GameCube were revealed at E3 2002. After numerous delays, a publisher change from a partnership between Crave Entertainment and Electronic Arts to Vivendi Universal Games, and lukewarm reviews and sales, VU Games announced the GameCube version's cancellation on August 13, 2003.	Warthog Games	Black Label Games (Vivendi Universal Games)
Malice	The platform game Malice was originally announced for release on PlayStation before later shifting development to PlayStation 2 and Xbox, with plans for a GameCube port at a later date. However, the game went through a protracted development cycle and multiple publishers, eventually resulting in developer Argonaut Software closing down shortly after the game's release, with the GameCube version never materializing.	Argonaut Games	
Mary-Kate and Ashley in Action!	A video game adaptation of the cartoon of the name starring popular twin duo Mary-Kate and Ashley Olsen was reported to have been in the works for a 2003 release for the GameCube, PlayStation 2, and Game Boy Advance. The game was never officially announced, only being revealed in a March 2004 lawsuit that the Olsen twins filed against Acclaim over unpaid royalties, with IGN and GameSpot reporting that the game's cancellation was what led to the partnership between Acclaim Entertainment and the girls' company Dualstar falling apart.	n-Space	Acclaim Entertainment
Mario Kick-off Football/Retro NFL Football	A proposed Mario Sports game by Retro Studios, reworked into a professional NFL football game by request of Nintendo, who was looking to create more mature games on GameCube. The development team's inexperience with sports game development, combined with competition from Electronic Arts and Sega's Madden NFL and NFL 2K series respectively, led to its cancellation.	Retro Studios	Nintendo
MetaForce (working title: Action/Adventure)	One of many Retro Studios games cancelled in order to focus on Metroid Prime. An action game following three female metahuman protagonists, Nintendo was reportedly underwhelmed by the game itself, but impressed with the developers and the technology used to create it, leading to the use of the Metroid IP.	Retro Studios	Nintendo
The Movies	When The Movies (2005) was first announced, it was also stated that console versions were in development for PlayStation 2, Xbox, and GameCube. However, these console ports were all cancelled in 2006 due to the underperformance of the game on PC.	Lionhead Studios	Activision
Narc	A reboot of Narc (1988) was announced for GameCube, PlayStation 2, and Xbox. While the other versions released in 2005, the GameCube version was cancelled due to disappointing sales of previous Midway games on the platform.	Midway Games	Midway Games
NBA Jam	Announced for the GameCube, PlayStation 2 and Xbox, the GameCube version was not present alongside the other versions at E3 2003, with Acclaim confirming the GameCube version's cancellation. The following month, the company announced that they had cancelled all GameCube games in development due to poor sales of their prior titles on the platform.	Acclaim Studios Austin	Acclaim Entertainment
NBA Ballers	A GameCube version of NBA Ballers was announced but was never released.	Midway Games	Midway Sports
Nintendo Pennant Chase Baseball	Intended to fill what Nintendo saw as a shortage of realistic baseball games for the GameCube, the game missed its initial 2005 release date, and was eventually quietly cancelled.	Exile Interactive	Nintendo
Perfect Dark Zero	Very early work was done on the game for the GameCube, but was cancelled when Microsoft bought Rare. Development shifted to the Xbox, which shifted again to Xbox 360 by the time the game released in 2005.	Rare	Nintendo
Picassio	Announced for the GameCube and PS2 as a non-violent action game about an art thief, developer Promethean Designs was unable to find a publisher, and the company went bankrupt before the game could be released.	Promethean Designs	
Pickles	Late in the GameCube's life cycle, Santa Cruz Games developed Pickles, a 3D platformer demo starring a monkey on a unicycle. While demonstrated at the 2006 Game Developer's Conference, the project was never expanded into a full game. A prototype of Pickles later surfaced in 2023.	Santa Cruz Games	
Untitled Pilotwings title	Never announced but heavily rumored to be in development during the GameCube's lifespan, a reboot of the Pilotwings franchise was, in retrospect, confirmed to be in development and cancelled. A new Pilotwings game would not be released until Pilotwings Resort (2011).	Factor 5	Nintendo
Power Rangers: Super Legends	Originally announced by Disney for the PlayStation 2, GameCube, Windows, and Nintendo DS at E3 2007, the GameCube version never materialized.	Artificial Mind & Movement	Disney Interactive Studios
Psi-Ops: The Mindgate Conspiracy	A version for GameCube began development alongside PlayStation 2 and Xbox ports; however, the decision was made late in the game's development to cancel the GameCube port and focus on the other two versions.	Midway Games	Midway Games
Psychonauts	Released for PlayStation 2, Xbox, and Windows, the game was not released for GameCube after publisher Majesco dropped support for the platform.	Double Fine	Majesco
Raven Blade/Rune Blade	Announced in 2001 for a late 2002 release on GameCube, the game was one of many projects cancelled by Retro Studios after the studio was restructured and made to focus on development of Metroid Prime (2002).	Retro Studios	Nintendo
Rayman 4	The fourth main entry in the Rayman series initially began as a traditional 3D platformer similar to previous series entries. However, the announcement of Nintendo's Wii console led Ubisoft to make the decision to restart development, cancelling the versions for older consoles and converting it into the party game Rayman Raving Rabbids (2006).	Phoenix Studio	Ubisoft
Road Rash: Jailbreak	Ports of the PlayStation game Road Rash: Jailbreak (2000) were announced for a 2002 release on GameCube and Game Boy Advance. While the Game Boy Advance version was eventually released in 2003, the GameCube port never materialized.		Electronic Arts
Rolling	The roller skating game in the vein of the Tony Hawk's Pro Skater games was originally announced in 2002 and in development for the PlayStation 2, original Xbox, Game Boy Advance, and the GameCube. However, during development, developer Rage Software suffered financial issues that eventually lead to its closure in 2003. The game was almost cancelled outright, until new publisher, SCi Games came in to salvage their work and release the game later that year. However, SCi only chose to release the PS2 and Xbox versions; the GameCube and GBA versions went unreleased.	Rage Software	Majesco
Saffire	Originally announced for Nintendo 64 as a game to showcase their middleware software they had created, it was shifted to GameCube once the N64 started hitting the end of its lifespan. The game was cancelled early in the GameCube's lifespan, though some elements were later reused in Barbarian (2002).	Saffire	Saffire
The Settlers V	The fifth entry in The Settlers series was announced for PC and consoles, but only the PC version was released under the name The Settlers: Heritage of Kings (2004).	Blue Byte	Ubisoft
Untitled Shantae title	Early work on a GameCube entry in the Shantae series began in 2002, but the project was quickly cancelled after the team chose to focus on developing Shantae Advance: Risky Revolution on the Game Boy Advance instead.	WayForward	
Shaun Palmer's Pro Snowboarder 2	A sequel to Shaun Palmer's Pro Snowboarder (2001) was announced for the PlayStation 2, original Xbox, Game Boy Advance, and the GameCube in 2002, but was cancelled on all platforms the following year due to publisher Activision's poor financial performance at the time.	Treyarch	Activision
Showdown: Legends of Wrestling	When first announced under its original title, Legends of Wrestling 3, the game was in development for the GameCube, PlayStation 2, and Xbox. However, in June 2003, Acclaim announced that they were discontinuing all software support for the GameCube due to sluggish sales. The game was later released as Showdown: Legends of Wrestling on PS2 and Xbox in 2004.	Acclaim Studios Austin	Acclaim Entertainment
Sonic Extreme	A skateboarding game in the vein of Tony Hawk's Pro Skater for the Sonic the Hedgehog franchise was concepted by Vision Scape Interactive after they finished their support work for Sonic Heroes (2003). A demo was created to pitch to Sega; while Yuji Naka reportedly supported it, Sega rejected the pitch, instead creating a hoverboard racing game Sonic Riders (2006) internally. Extreme had not been publicly known about until a playable version of the pitch demo leaked onto the internet in 2012.	Vision Scape Interactive	Sega
Stage Debut	Developed as a follow up to the Japan-only Mario Artist: Talent Studio (2000) for the Nintendo 64DD, it involved taking a picture of the player with a Game Boy Advance, transferring it to the GameCube, and having it mapped over a cartoonish character model's face. The game was never released, but some aspects were reworked into concepts used for the Wii's Mii characters and Wii Sports (2006).	Nintendo	Nintendo
StarCraft: Ghost	Announced in 2002 for the GameCube, PlayStation 2, and Xbox, the game experienced a lengthy and troubled development cycle, resulting in all versions of the game being cancelled between 2005 and 2006. While never officially released, some content from early builds of the game leaked onto the internet in 2020.	Blizzard Entertainment	
The Suffering	Originally announced for GameCube, PlayStation 2, and Xbox, the GameCube version was cancelled due to disappointing sales of previous Midway games on the platform.	Surreal Software	Midway Games
Super Mario 128	Initially debuted and demonstrated at the Nintendo Space World expo in 2000, the game was discussed for years without any further details. In 2007, Shigeru Miyamoto clarified that gameplay ideas and concepts explored for the game were instead implemented into Pikmin (2001) and Super Mario Galaxy (2007).	Nintendo EAD	Nintendo
Super Paper Mario	Initially announced at E3 2006 as one of the last Nintendo games coming to GameCube, development was moved to the Wii and released only for that platform in 2007.	Intelligent Systems	Nintendo
Tengai Makyō III: Namida	Originally announced for GameCube and PlayStation 2, the GameCube version was officially cancelled in 2004, with the PS2 version releasing the following year.	Red Entertainment	Hudson Soft
Terminator 3: Rise of the Machines	Announced for the GameCube, PlayStation 2 and Xbox, the GameCube version was later cancelled in September 2003 in favor of focusing on the other two consoles.	Black Ops Entertainment	Atari
Thornado	A spinoff of the Turrican series, the game was far enough along to have a short playable demo at Nintendo Space World, but went silent in the years following. While a trademark was renewed in 2004, it never released in any capacity.	Factor 5	
Tiny Toon Adventures: Defenders of the Universe	A fighting game based on the Tiny Toon Adventures animated series was announced in 2001, and would have featured similar gameplay mechanics to developer Treasure's previous fighting game, Rakugaki Showtime (1999). While the game was completed and scheduled for a July 2002 release on GameCube and PlayStation 2, it experienced multiple delays and was ultimately never released for either platform, allegedly due to publisher Conspiracy Entertainment experiencing financial difficulties at the time. A near-final prototype of the PS2 version was later found and released onto the internet in 2009.	Treasure	Conspiracy Entertainment
Tom Clancy's Ghost Recon Advanced Warfighter	Originally announced in 2005 as a title in development for GameCube, PlayStation 2, Xbox, and Xbox 360, the GameCube release never materialized.	Red Storm Entertainment	Ubisoft
Too Human	Originally announced in 1999 for the PlayStation, development was moved to GameCube after Nintendo signed a contract for developer Silicon Knights to make games exclusively for Nintendo platforms. However, due to focusing on development of Eternal Darkness and Metal Gear Solid: The Twin Snakes, the game was not completed before the contract expired. Microsoft later agreed to publish the game, which was ultimately released on the Xbox 360 in 2008.	Silicon Knights	Nintendo
Toxic Grind	While initially announced for both GameCube and Xbox, THQ later chose to cancel the GameCube version, feeling the Xbox was a "better fit" for the game.	Blue Shift Inc.	THQ
Tremors: The Game	Originally announced for the GameCube, PlayStation 2, Xbox, and Windows in 2002, the game was quietly cancelled later that year following the purchase of Rock Solid Studios by Starbreeze Studios.	Rock Solid Studios	Conspiracy Entertainment
Unity	Initially announced for the GameCube in early 2003, the game was cancelled in December 2004. Developer Peter Molyneux cited the inability to meet the game's ambition and scope within a realistic timeframe as a reason for the cancellation.	Llamasoft	Lionhead Studios
Velvet Dark	In 2015, Rare developer Gregg Mayles revealed that after the completion of Perfect Dark (2000) for the Nintendo 64, the company had started work on a spinoff game called Velvet Dark, starring the sister of Perfect Dark protagonist Joanna Dark. While Mayles stated that development was proposed for the Nintendo 64, the shared design documents proposed Game Boy Advance connectivity, something only its successor the GameCube had hardware compatibility for, leading publications to believe it was in development for GameCube as well. In a 2016 retrospective, designer Duncan Botwood elaborated that while some pre-production work was done on Velvet Dark, the game was never approved for full production. A Perfect Dark sequel would not be released until Perfect Dark Zero (2005) for the Xbox 360.	Rare	Nintendo
Wallace & Gromit: The Curse of the Were-Rabbit	Versions were announced for GameCube, PlayStation 2 and Xbox, but the GameCube version was the only one not to be released.	Frontier Developments	Konami
World Series Baseball 2K3	Originally announced for GameCube, PlayStation 2, and Xbox, Sega chose to cancel the GameCube version due to development delays.	Visual Concepts	Sega
Yoshi Touch & Go / Yoshi's Balloon Trip	Early work on the game started on the GameCube before shifting to the Nintendo DS, due to the developers believing its touch screen controls were better suited for the gameplay concept.	Nintendo	Nintendo
