= Road to Sunday =

American football video game

Road to Sunday was a cancelled American football video game that was developed by San Diego Studio and would have been published by Sony Computer Entertainment for the PlayStation 2 and the PlayStation Portable. Despite a trailer being released for the game in July 2005, Road to Sunday was cancelled. Some of the game's idea were similar to the later released Blitz: The League series.

== History ==
The game would have been a successor to the NFL GameDay series. Sony no longer had the rights to use NFL Teams or Players in video games after Electronic Arts acquired an exclusive NFL video game license in December 2004.

== Plot ==
Road to Sunday would have revolved around Blake Doogan, who inherits a pro football team after his father is killed in a suspicious explosion while in Jamaica. Later, Blake learns that his father borrowed large sums of money from a Jamaican kingpin to purchase the professional football team the Los Angeles Show, and Doogan's father's debt is now his debt.

=== Gameplay ===
The gameplay would have followed Blake, his friend/sidekick Harry and seven other football players as they attempted to successful in football in order to generate enough money to pay off the kingpin and win a fictional football league championship. The on-the-field football experience is best characterized as mission-based football, done through the introduction of a new gameplay experience, Position Specific Gameplay (PSG). Players not only compete on the gridiron, but also gain exposure to an underworld of questionable characters, gambling, and an underground fighting league ran by the corrupt Jamaican kingpin. These off-field exploitations will drive the storyline as well as increase players’ abilities to perform in future missions and impact the outcome of future football games.
