= Third World (video game) =

- Developer: Redline Games
- Platform: Windows
- Release: Cancelled
- Genre: Strategy RPG

Third World is a cancelled role-playing video game from Redline Games and Activision.

== Gameplay ==
Third World was developed as a real-time tactical role-playing game with a 3-D graphics engine. The game was set in the future on a decaying post-apocalyptic planet, in which the player leads a group of heroes as they struggle for survival against rival gangs in urban warzones. Gang members could be Mutants, Androids, Cyborgs and Aliens, each having their own special abilities as well as character classes, and gain technology and artifacts while completing missions.

== Development ==
The game was in development at Redline Games, a company founded by programmer James Anhalt, designer Ron Millar, and other former members of Blizzard Entertainment. Millar was the game's lead designer. Around 10 people were working on the game.

Activision announced the game in April 1998 and showcased it at E3 1998. The game was originally scheduled to release in late 1998. The release date was pushed to 1999. Activision dropped to the game in April 1999 for unknown reasons. The game was later cancelled in January 2000 due to a lack of funding.
