= List of cancelled games for NEC consoles =

This is a list of games that were cancelled from release on NEC's line of consoles raging from the TurboGrafx-16 to the PC-FX. Some of those games were never released on any platform to begin with, while others had at least one release but were never ported or remade for the platform they were planned for.

== Fourth Generation ==
=== TurboGrafx-16/PC Engine + TurboExpress / PC Engine GT ===
List of cancelled TurboGrafx-16 and TurboExpress games
Title(s)	Cancellation date	Developer	Publisher	Format
Aru Shock	1992			HuCard
Bonk's Quest	1992	Red Company	TTI	HuCard
Chess	1992			HuCard
Cocoron	1992			HuCard
Dragon Breed	1992	Irem		HuCard
Dyno Force	1992			Super CD-ROM²
Ghoul Patrol			Virgin Interactive	
Hi-Ten Bomberman	1993	Hudson Soft	NEC	HuCard
Imperial Force	1992	SystemSoft	Sur Dé Wave	CD-ROM²
Klaw Wars	1992			HuCard
Magical Puzzle Popils	1991		Tengen	HuCard
Marble Madness	1992	Tengen	Tengen	HuCard
Might and Magic II	1992	New World Computing		CD-ROM²
Missile Fighter	1993	Media Works	NEC	Super CD-ROM²
Mortal Kombat	1992	Turbo Technologies Inc. (TTI)		HuCard
Off the Wall			Tengen	HuCard
Ogedema	1992			HuCard
Peter Pack Rat	1991		Tengen	HuCard
Phelios	1993	Namco	Namco	Super CD-ROM²
Project Firestart				
Quiz Panic	1992			CD-ROM²
Road of Wars	1992			CD-ROM²
Shin Den Shogi	1992			HuCard
Shobinbin Man 3	1992			CD-ROM²
Space Fantasy Zone	1992	NEC Avenue	NEC Avenue	CD-ROM²
Star Proja	1992			Super CD-ROM²
Super Shevarot's Shield	1992			Super CD-ROM²
Tengai Makyou III	1995			Super CD-ROM²
Thunder Force II		Technosoft		
TV Sports: Baseball	1993	Cinemaware	NEC	HuCard
Verytex	1992	Asmik		HuCard
Wardner's Forest	1992			CD-ROM²
Yo Shi No Shi	1992			Super CD-ROM²

=== TurboDuo / PC Engine Duo ===
List of cancelled TurboDuo games
Title(s)	Cancellation date	Developer	Publisher
Dangerous Journey	1993		TTI

=== SuperGrafx / PC Engine SG ===
List of cancelled SuperGrafx games
Title(s)	Cancellation date	Developer	Publisher
Galaxy Force II	1992	Sega	
Strider	1992	Capcom	NEC Avenue

== Fifth Generation ==
=== PC-FX ===
List of cancelled PC-FX games
Title(s)	Cancellation date	Developer	Publisher
Cyber Fighter	1994	NEC	NEC
FX Fighter	1994	Hudson Soft	Hudson Soft
Hero's Ambition	1995	Microcabin	NEC
Hi-Ten Bomberman	1993	Hudson Soft	Hudson Soft
Kuma Soldier	1995	Hudson Soft	Hudson Soft
Lords of Thunder FX	1995	Red Company	Hudson Soft
Masters Tournament	1995	T&E Soft	NEC
Super Star Soldier 3D	1993	Hudson	NEC
Tengai Makyou III	1995	Hudson Soft	
