= SpaceStationSim =

2006 video game

- Developer: Vision Videogames
- Publishers: Enlight Interactive; 1C Company
- Designer: Vision Videogames
- Engine: RenderWare
- Platform: Windows
- Release: November 2006
- Genre: Life simulation
- Mode: Single-player

SpaceStationSim is a space station simulation video game by American studio Vision Videogames. The game was developed with cooperation from NASA and the Japanese Space Administration. A PlayStation 2 version for the game was announced but never released.

== Gameplay ==
Character select screen

SpaceStationSim is a life simulation game. The player takes the role as Chief Administrator of NASA.

== Development ==
The game was in developed for 5 years with a team of 20 people from Vision Videogames, as well as over 30 contributors from NASA. Officially, the game was announced in September 2003 by GRS Games, the then predecessor of Vision Videogames. GRS Games was an independent development company based in Towson, Maryland, that was working on the game. The company was acquired by Vision Videogames in March 2004 in a management buyout. The game's budget was $3 million but then raised to $3.5 million.

== Reception ==
Reception

Aggregate score
Aggregator	Score
Metacritic	57%

Review scores
Publication	Score
GamesRadar+	60%
IGN	45%
PC Gamer (US)	65%

The game has a 57% rating on the review aggregation website Metacritic, based on 5 reviews. GameZone rated the game 7.5 of 10. The Space review praised the game, saying its one of the best contemporary space program-themed computer games for kids.

SpaceStationSim eschews the hard-core management focus and deserves merit as the first simulation of space station life, bladder-challenged astronauts and all. It is an immersive and endearing game that, although ultimately a bit shallow, those with a love of games and space should consider picking up. The Space Review
