= List of cancelled games for Commodore platforms =

This is a list of cancelled games for the VIC-20, Commodore 64, Amiga, and CD32. Some of these games were never released on any platform, while others had at least one release but were never ported or remade for the platform they were planned for.

== VIC-20 ==
List of cancelled VIC-20 games
Title(s)	Cancellation date	Developer	Publisher
Cubic Critters	1982	Commodore International	Commodore International
Hungry Horace	1983	Beam Software	Melbourne House
Monster Muncher	1983		Spectrum Games Limited
Pursuit of the Pink Panther	1983	Roklan Corporation	
Space Vultures	1982	Commodore International	Commodore International
Trivia UK	1985	Anirog	
Q-Bert Qubes		Parker Brothers	

== Commodore 64 ==
List of cancelled Commodore 64 games
Title(s)	Cancellation date	Developer	Publisher
Arcade Wizzard	1988	Beam Software	
Bomberman	1991	Hudson Soft	Ubisoft
Bubbler	1987	Ultimate Play the Game	Lynsoft
Devious Designs	1991	Image Works	Image Works
Hooray for Henrietta	1991	Scetlander	Scetlander
King Arthur's Quest	1985	Hill MacGibbon	
Solar Jetman	1991	Rare	Tradewest
Throne of Fire	1987	Consult Computer Systems	Melbourne House
Warriors	1988	Rainbow Arts	

== Amiga ==
List of cancelled Amiga games
Title(s)	Cancellation date	Developer	Publisher
Pussies Galore	1995	Amber Developments	Team17
Thalimar: Land of Chaos	1999	Paweł 'Zombie' Ząbek	

== CD32 ==
List of cancelled CD32 games
Title(s)	Cancellation date	Developer	Publisher
Pussies Galore	1995	Amber Developments	Team17
