= List of cancelled Nintendo Switch games =

The Nintendo Switch is a video game console launched by Nintendo in 2017. After the poor commercial performance of their prior video game console, the Wii U, Nintendo decided to take a different approach with their next system. Struggling to support both the Wii U and their handheld video game console, the Nintendo 3DS, they opted to create a hybrid video game console that could be played both as a traditional console hooked up to a television, and as a handheld. The approach was a success, with the Switch passing over 150 million sold, making it one of the best selling consoles of all-time. However, its different build, and weaker hardware compared to its competitors, did lead to game cancellation. This list documents games that were in development for the Switch at some point, but did not end up being released for it in any capacity.

== Switch 1 ==
There are currently 28 games on this list. (Note: This number is always up to date by this script.)

List of cancelled Nintendo Switch games
Title(s)	Notes / Reasons	Developer	Publisher
BallisticNG	A Wipeout-inspired racing game originally released on PC platforms in 2018, a Switch version was in development for multiple years. However, the game ran on the Unity game engine, and was cancelled in 2023 in response to its controversial run-time fee announced that year.	Neognosis	Neognosis
Crash Team Rumble	A online multiplayer video game starring Crash Bandicoot was released for PlayStation 4, PlayStation 5, Xbox One, and Xbox Series X/S in 2023. A Nintendo Switch version intended for a later release was in development, but was cancelled due to poor critical and commercial reception of the released versions.	Toys for Bob	Activision
Decapolice	The game was first announced in 2023 as a JRPG where you play as a fictional police officer who negotiates with criminals instead of always fighting them. Originally intended for release for the PlayStation 4 and original Switch in 2024, repeated delays into 2025 and 2026 saw both of those platforms dropped in favor of Switch 2 and PlayStation 5 releases.	Level-5	Level-5
Donkey Kong Bananza	Development initially began for the Nintendo Switch, but upon learning of the Nintendo Switch 2, the team decided to push the game to the newer system, believing it would be better able to handle the gameplay concepts they sought to implement.	Nintendo	Nintendo
Donkey Kong Freedom	While never publicly announced by any of the companies involved, Nintendo, reportedly impressed by Vicarious Visions and Activision's handling of Donkey Kong and Bowser in the Wii U version of Skylanders: SuperChargers (2015), greenlit Vicarious Visions to develop a new Donkey Kong game the following year for the Switch. Plans included it being a 3D platformer, with an emphasis on Tony Hawk's Pro Skater-like grinding across tree vines. The game was in development for around six months, but cancelled upon Activision's to focus more of its development teams on the Call of Duty franchise.	Vicarious Visions	Activision
The Duskbloods	Development originally began on the original Switch, but was moved to the Switch 2 after the development team was given access to its the superior hardware power, wherein it is scheduled to release in 2026.	FromSoftware	FromSoftware
Dynasty Warriors 3: Complete Edition Remastered	A remaster of Dynasty Warriors 3 (2001) was announced in September 2025 for Nintendo Switch, among other platforms, planned for release in March 2026. Two months before release, Koei Tecmo announced that the game would be delayed indefinitely for quality control reasons. In June, it was confirmed that the game would launch the following October, and that it would no longer be releasing on the original Switch.	Omega Force	Koei Tecmo
Evil Dead: The Game	Originally released for Windows, PlayStation, and Xbox platforms in 2022, a Switch version was set to follow, but was cancelled in September 2023, alongside future content updates. The restructuring program of Embracer Group was named a possible reason by the press.	Saber Interactive	Boss Team Games
Final Fantasy XV	Director Hajime Tabata stated that Square Enix attempted to get the game up and running on the Switch hardware in 2017, but were unable to get it performing well enough to warrant releasing it. A port of Final Fantasy XV: Pocket Edition was released for the Switch in 2018 instead.	Square Enix	Square Enix
Football Manager 25	The 2025 iteration of the yearly Football Manager franchise was delayed twice before eventually being cancelled outright. The developers cited internal concerns about its quality, and that any further delays would move it too far the past the start of the current football season. The team instead deciding to cancel the game in favor of focusing on the 2026 iteration.	Sports Interactive	Sega
Harmony	A game in development by Retro Studios that involved playing as a fairy that could transform its appearance in order to solve puzzles. While never officially announced, it reportedly featured a protracted, difficult development cycle in which they were not happy with progress after years of work, eventually leading to its cancellation. In 2025, a playable build was found on an early dev kit and leaked onto the internet.	Retro Studios	Nintendo
Hyper Sports R	First announced at E3 2018, the game was in development for two years before being cancelled in June 2020. Konami only said that it was cancelled due to "various circumstances".	Konami	Konami
Hyrule Warriors: Age of Imprisonment	Development of the title began on the original Switch, but was cancelled in favor of a 2025 Nintendo Switch 2 release once the development team tested the game on the stronger hardware and saw that the smoother frames per second helped improve their overall enjoyment of the gameplay.	AAA Games Studio	Koei Tecmo/Nintendo
Kena: Bridge of Spirits	Following its initial release in 2021 on PlayStation 4 and PlayStation 5, the development team explored making a Nintendo Switch version of the game. The team was able to get the game running on it in a playable state, but the team felt it took too many cuts to the game's performance and art style to get there, and cancelled it. The time spent attempting a Switch version did streamline and speed up efforts to release the game for the Switch 2 instead in 2026.	Ember Lab	Ember Lab
Lego/Civilization crossover	In 2025, in a leak of an old Switch dev kit, there was content indicating that a video game crossover between the Lego and Civilization video game franchises was in development. A title screen was found, though the game itself was not playable or bootable beyond the start up screen.		
Mario Kart World	Development of the title began in March 2017, shortly after the release of the Switch. The game was in development for several years, but the development team was unable to get the game's premise—open world racing and 24-player races—to run well on the original Switch hardware. Following the introduction of the "Booster Course Pass" downloadable content for Mario Kart 8 Deluxe, development shifted to the Nintendo Switch 2, where it released on June 5, 2025.	Nintendo	Nintendo
Marvel's Midnight Suns	Announced in 2021, versions for PlayStation and Xbox platforms released across 2022 and 2023, while the Switch version was announced as "no longer planned" in May 2023. While no official reason was given, poor sales on other platforms and difficulties porting the game to the Switch's hardware were noted as likely reasons by publications.	Firaxis Games	2K
Occultic;Nine: New World	A video game adaptation of the light novel Occultic;Nine was released in Japan for PlayStation 4, PlayStation Vita, and Xbox One in 2017 to poor reception. A revised version titled New World was announced in 2018, planned as free DLC that would address issues and add new content, with New World also set to release as a standalone Switch title. It was quietly cancelled in August 2022.	Mages	Mages
Pathfinder: Kingmaker	Released on PC platforms in 2018, console versions were announced for 2020. While PlayStation 4 and Xbox One versions were released, the Switch version was cancelled.	Owlcat Games	Deep Silver
Persona 3 Reload	A remake of Persona 3 (2006), was released in 2024 for PlayStation 4, PlayStation 5, Xbox One, Xbox Series X/S and Windows. Atlus producer Kazuhisa Wada stated it was originally planned to launch on Nintendo Switch alongside the other versions, but development was stalled due to technical constraints that would've required reworking UI and art elements to tailor the game around the console's limitations. When a simultaneous release with other platforms was determined to be impossible, the Switch version was cancelled, though a version for the Switch 2 was later released the following year.	P-Studio	Sega
Pillars of Eternity II: Deadfire	Released for PC platforms in 2018, with console versions to follow, a Switch version did not launch alongside PlayStation 4 and Xbox One versions in 2020. In 2022, the Switch version was officially cancelled, with developers citing difficulties in getting the game running on the system.	Obsidian Entertainment	Versus Evil
Pokémon Legends: Ho-Oh and Lugia	Among internal documents seized from developer Game Freak during a ransomware attack on the company in 2024, were plans that the studio was initially planning for their second entry in the Pokémon Legends sub-series following Arceus (2022) to comprise two games set in the Johto region from Pokémon Gold and Silver (1999). They were proposed as an origin story for the first Pokémon Trainers and involving the protagonist journeying to the "Burned Tower", a predecessor to the Bell Tower perched on by Ho-Oh. The game was cancelled in favor of developing and releasing Pokémon Legends: Z-A (2025) for Nintendo Switch and Nintendo Switch 2.	Game Freak	Nintendo / The Pokémon Company
Ratatan	Originally announced in 2023 as a multiplatform release that included a Switch version, in March 2026, developer Ratata Arts announced that the Switch version had been dropped in favor of a Switch 2 version due to performance problems encountered in the game's multiplayer gameplay.	Ratata Arts	Game Source Entertainment
Untitled Ridge Racer game	In 2025, an old Switch dev kit was found to have an unannounced entry from the Ridge Racer franchise being worked on for the Switch. The content found was dated back to 2017, and as such, was considered to be cancelled and no longer an active project from publications. The early build was in a rough state, but was playable, with footage leaking onto the internet.	Bandai Namco Studios Singapore	Bandai Namco
RoboCop: Rogue City	A video game based on the Robocop franchise was announced for the Switch, PlayStation 5, Xbox Series X/S, and PC platforms in 2022, though the Switch version was cancelled one month prior to the game's release. While no official reason was given, IGN felt that the game was too ambitious for the Switch's hardware.	Teyon	Nacon
Sengoku Night Blood	A Switch version of the 2017 mobile game was announced, but was later cancelled in October 2019 due to "various circumstances". The mobile version terminated service two months later.	Idea Factory	Marvelous
Steep	One of the first third party games announced for the Switch prior to launch, it was later cancelled in August 2018 in favor of providing live service content to the PlayStation 4 and Xbox One versions instead.	Ubisoft Annecy	Ubisoft
Yoshi and the Mysterious Book	Development of the game began for the Switch before being moved to Switch 2.	Good-Feel	Nintendo
