= Wonder Flick =

2014 video game

- Developer: Level-5
- Publisher: Level-5
- Director: Akihiro Hino
- Producer: Akihiro Hino
- Artists: Nao Ikeda; Tokuzo Nagano
- Composer: Nobuo Uematsu
- Platforms: iOS, Android
- Release: JP: January 8, 2014
- Genre: Role-playing

Wonder Flick was a role-playing video game developed and published by Level-5, which was released for iOS and Android devices. Versions for the Wii U, PlayStation Vita, PlayStation 3, PlayStation 4, and Xbox One were planned, but these were eventually cancelled upon the shutdown of the mobile version in 2015.

== Gameplay ==
Players can customize their avatar with accessories and embark on an adventure to save Grimnarth, a land imperiled by monsters. In battle, medals with icons corresponding to weapon attacks, magic, recovery items etc. are lined up, and players input commands by flicking the screen.

== Development ==
The game was announced at a Level-5 event, which was held on August 26, 2013. It was planned to be the first game that shared data across all platforms, a functionality that was called "Uniplay". Pre-registration started in November 2013. Registration began for the iOS version on December 14, and for the Android version on December 25.

A prologue chapter was announced that would be an introduction to the game's story and gameplay. If players beat this chapter, the equipment "Snow Lady's Necklace" would be given when players began the full version. It exceeded 100,000 downloads, 21 hours after launch. Later that month, it was announced that the number of registered players had exceeded 110,000. The Android version was released on January 8, 2014, and the iOS version on February 8, 2014.

On August 30, 2014, the game was updated to gameplay version 2.00, and the title of the game was changed to Wonder Flick R. On September 14, 2015, Level-5 announced that the game's service would be terminated and players refunded for their microtransaction purchases, with the planned cross-platform releases also being cancelled.

The game's director, Akihiro Hino, created the concept of "Uniplay" because he believed that consoles needed to find a way to exist alongside smartphones to survive. He wanted to provide a "different but enjoyable play experience" on both smartphones and consoles for the same title. The game's character design was created by Nao Ikeda, sub-character designer for Final Fantasy XIII, and boss monster design was created by Tokuzo Nagano, who also worked on Professor Layton and Inazuma Eleven. The game features music by composer Nobuo Uematsu.
