= Human Element =

- Developer: Robotoki
- Director: Robert Bowling
- Producer: Robert Bowling
- Engine: CryEngine
- Platforms: Microsoft Windows; PlayStation 4 Xbox One; Wii U
- Release: Cancelled
- Genres: First-person shooter, role-playing
- Mode: Multiplayer

Human Element is a cancelled online multiplayer video game under development by Robotoki for Microsoft Windows, PlayStation 4, and Xbox One. Development was halted when the studio was closed.

== Development ==
Human Element is the first game being developed by the independent game company Robotoki, which was formed by Robert Bowling after he left Infinity Ward following the release of Call of Duty: Modern Warfare 3. The premise of the game centers on the question, "What is the greatest threat in a zombie apocalypse?"; Bowling believes it is the fear that the walking dead instill in the survivors, who lead them to do unreasonable things to survive. The game focuses on the survivors more so than the zombies, "the human element", and takes place 35 years after the zombie apocalypse began. Game difficulty was to be based on the number and age of people in your party. Easy was just the player, medium was the player and an adult companion, while hard was the player and a child. In the latter 2 difficulties, the survival of the AI companion was to be a major part of the gameplay.

It can be played across multiple devices; an example given is that one player could play the console version for hundreds of hours, just for the action, whereas an intelligent class player, playing on a tablet, can join into the previous player's alliance and scavenge for them, and then benefit from the buffs given by the strength class of the alliance. Although it isn't the same experience, players all contribute to the overall goal of survival.

There are three attributes players can choose when creating their character: class, identity, and persona. Class types include action, intelligence, and stealth, with each offering a number of different abilities. Identity choices include a solo adult, partnered adult, or adult with child, and is the same as selecting a difficulty at the start of the game. Persona determines a player’s sex and race. Bowling states, "how you choose to start in the world will determine how you can engage and impact in the scenarios you will be presented with on a physical and moral level that you approach this world."

The game was announced on June 1, 2012, and more details were released in the July edition of Game Informer. On July 19, 2012, Robotoki's president Robert Bowling announced that Human Element would have an episodic prequel released exclusively on the Ouya, as a first-party title. But it was later announced that the studio decided to cancel the Ouya version of Human Element "very early on" and switch focus to the open-world experience on other more powerful platforms.

A teaser trailer premiered in late 2014, showing off possible early gameplay. Despite the initial details and pictures of the game creating a more darker tone and survival focussed gameplay, the trailer was much more action oriented, surprising and polarizing some fans. It is possible that due to development issues, the direction of the game was changed. Robotoki was shut down on January 20, 2015 due to lack of publishing deal of the premium version of the game and the inability of the founder of the company to self-fund the development of the game. The game is technically still on hiatus as a result of the shutdown.
