= Tom Clancy's Ghost Recon Frontline =

- Developers: Ubisoft Bucharest; Ubisoft Kyiv
- Publisher: Ubisoft
- Series: Tom Clancy's Ghost Recon
- Platforms: Microsoft Windows; PlayStation 4; PlayStation 5; Xbox One; Xbox Series X/S; Google Stadia
- Release: Cancelled
- Genre: Battle royale
- Mode: Multiplayer

Tom Clancy's Ghost Recon Frontline was a planned live-service first-person massively multiplayer online PvP class-based tactical shooter battle royale game by Ubisoft announced on October 6, 2021. It was under development for Microsoft Windows, PlayStation 4, PlayStation 5, Xbox One and Xbox Series X/S, plus Amazon Luna and Google Stadia. On July 21, 2022, Ubisoft announced that it had cancelled development of the game.

== Development and cancellation ==
The first trailer received a large number of dislikes on YouTube. Ubisoft promoted a giveaway for Ghost Recon's 20 years anniversary.

Due to an undisclosed reason, Ubisoft cancelled the alpha test and delayed it indefinitely.

On January 28, 2022, Ubisoft launched a closed beta for the game under confidentiality agreements, although gameplay soon leaked onto Twitch. The footage was heavily criticized for being visually and conceptually similar to Call of Duty: Warzone, another free-to-play battle royale game.

In July 2022, Ubisoft announced that it had cancelled the project.
