= List of best-selling video games in the United States by year =

This is a listing of the best-selling video games in the United States annually by units sold since 1980, with sales figures from Circana since 1994. The United States is a very competitive market for video game developers. Games from different developers around the world have entered the annual lists of top ten best-selling games in the United States. The most successful developers are mostly from the United States, Japan, Canada, the United Kingdom and Sweden.

Among the forty-three reported annual top-sellers between 1980 and 2024, thirteen were published by Activision Blizzard and another thirteen by Nintendo, four each by Atari and Take-Two Interactive, three by Electronic Arts, and two each by Sega and Acclaim Entertainment. Video game publishers Activision Blizzard and Electronic Arts managed to enter the list of ten best-selling games every single year with at least one of their games for the last fifteen years in a row. Of the twelve best-selling games released in the last fourteen years, twelve were from Call of Duty franchise and published by Activision Blizzard. Madden NFL and the Call of Duty series have been on the annual top ten best-sellers list twelve times over the last thirteen years. Call of Duty has been the best-selling video game series in the US for the past sixteen years.

The Circana lists do not encompass the industry as a whole, as some publishers, developers, and the majority of indie developers do not share data with NPD. Some video games companies also do not share physical games sales and some digital storefront sales such as Steam and Battle.net. Companies that share data with NPD include: Bandai Namco Entertainment, Capcom, Disney Interactive, Embracer Group, Konami, Krafton, Marvelous, NCSoft, Sega, Sony Interactive Entertainment, Square Enix, Take-Two Interactive, Warner Bros. Games, and Wizard of the Coast.

Ubisoft has stopped sharing data with Circana in 2025. Electronic Arts, Microsoft and Nintendo does not share digital sales data with the NPD. Blizzard Entertainment does not share Battle.net sales, and other publishers may not share their data. As a result, some games are underrepresented.

== 1980–1997 ==
Year	Top-selling title	Developer	Publisher	Platform(s)	Sales	Ref
1980	Space Invaders	Taito	Atari	Atari VCS	1,318,655	
1981	Space Invaders	Taito	Atari	Atari VCS	2,964,137	
1982	Pac-Man	Namco, Atari	Atari	Atari VCS	7,271,844	
1983	Ms. Pac-Man	GCC, Midway	Atari	Atari VCS	1,963,078	
1986	Super Mario Bros.	Nintendo R&D4	Nintendo	NES	1,000,000+	
1987	The Legend of Zelda	Nintendo R&D4	Nintendo	NES	2,000,000	
1988	Super Mario Bros./Duck Hunt	Nintendo	Nintendo	NES	2,000,000+	
1989	Super Mario Bros./Duck Hunt	Nintendo	Nintendo	NES	Unknown	
1990	Super Mario Bros. 3	Nintendo R&D4	Nintendo	NES	8,000,000	
1991	Sonic the Hedgehog	Sonic Team	Sega	Genesis	1,000,000+	
1992	Sonic the Hedgehog 2	Sega	Sega	Genesis	2,000,000	
1993	Mortal Kombat	Midway	Acclaim	Multi-platform	1,627,800	
1994	Donkey Kong Country	Rare	Nintendo	SNES	2,057,006	
1995	Donkey Kong Country	Rare	Nintendo	SNES	1,000,000+	
1996	Super Mario 64	Nintendo EAD	Nintendo	N64	2,000,000+	
1997	Mario Kart 64	Nintendo EAD	Nintendo	N64	1,500,000+	

== 1990–2017 ==
The following titles are the top ten best-selling video games of all time in the United States up until 2017, according to sales figures from The NPD Group. The list covers console games and PC games, but does not include console pack-in game bundles, arcade video games, mobile games or free-to-play titles. Among the top ten titles, six were developed or published by Japanese company Nintendo, two published by American company Activision, and two from British developer Rockstar North and American publisher Rockstar Games.

No.	Title	Year	Developer	Publisher	Platform(s)	Sales	Ref
1	Grand Theft Auto V	2013	Rockstar North	Rockstar Games	Multi-platform	—	
2	Pokémon Red / Blue / Yellow / Green	1998	Game Freak	Nintendo	GB, GBA	19,370,000	(Note: Red sold 4.9 million. Blue sold 5.03 million. Yellow sold 5.2 million. FireRed and LeafGreen sold 2.12 million each.)
3	Wii Fit / Plus	2008	Nintendo EAD	Nintendo	Wii	15,500,000	
4	Call of Duty: Black Ops	2010	Treyarch	Activision	Multi-platform	14,983,459	
5	Pokémon Gold / Silver / Crystal	2000	Game Freak	Nintendo	GBC, DS	13,293,889	(Note: Gold sold 3.8 million. Silver sold 3.9 million. Crystal sold 1.65 million. HeartGold and SoulSilver sold 3,943,889.)
6	Wii Play	2006	Nintendo EAD	Nintendo	Wii	13,060,000	
7	Mario Kart Wii	2008	Nintendo EAD	Nintendo	Wii	11,300,000	
8	Super Mario Bros. 3	1990	Nintendo R&D4	Nintendo	NES, GBA	10,880,000	(Note: Super Mario Bros. 3 sold more than 8 million for Nintendo Entertainment System. Super Mario Advance 4: Super Mario Bros. 3 sold 2.88 million for Game Boy Advance.)
9	Guitar Hero III: Legends of Rock	2007	Neversoft	Activision	Multi-platform	10,200,000	
10	Grand Theft Auto: San Andreas	2004	Rockstar North	Rockstar Games	PS2, Xbox	9,800,000	

== 1998–2009 ==
=== 1998 ===
The Legend of Zelda: Ocarina of Time was the best-selling game of 1998.

Rank	Title	Developer	Publisher
1.	The Legend of Zelda: Ocarina of Time	Nintendo EAD	Nintendo
2.	GoldenEye 007	Rare	Nintendo
3.	WWF Warzone	Iguana West, Probe Entertainment	Acclaim Entertainment
4.	NFL Blitz '99	Midway Games	Midway Games
5.	WCW/NWO Revenge	Asmik Ace Entertainment, AKI Corporation	THQ
6.	Resident Evil 2	Capcom	Capcom
7.	Banjo-Kazooie	Rare	Nintendo
8.	Gran Turismo	Japan Studio	Sony Computer Entertainment
9.	Madden NFL 99	EA Tiburon	Electronic Arts
10.	Super Mario 64	Nintendo EAD	Nintendo

=== 1999 ===
Donkey Kong 64 was the best-selling game of 1999. Seven of the 10 best-selling games in the US in 1998 were published by Nintendo.

Rank	Title	Developer	Publisher
1.	Donkey Kong 64	Rare	Nintendo
2.	Pokémon Red/Blue	Game Freak	Nintendo
3.	Pokémon Snap	HAL Laboratory	Nintendo
4.	Super Smash Bros.	HAL Laboratory	Nintendo
5.	WWF Attitude	Acclaim Studios Salt Lake City	Acclaim Entertainment
6.	Pokémon Pinball	Jupiter, HAL Laboratory	Nintendo
7.	The Legend of Zelda: Ocarina of Time	Nintendo EAD	Nintendo
8.	Mario Party	Hudson Soft	Nintendo
9.	Driver	Reflections Interactive	GT Interactive
10	Final Fantasy VIII	Square	Square Electronic Arts

=== 2000 ===
Pokémon Gold/Silver was the best-selling game of 2000.

Rank	Title	Developer	Publisher
1.	Pokémon Gold/Silver	Game Freak	Nintendo
2.	Pokémon Stadium	Nintendo EAD	Nintendo
3.	Tony Hawk's Pro Skater	Neversoft	Activision
4.	Tony Hawk's Pro Skater 2	Neversoft	Activision
5.	The Legend of Zelda: Majora's Mask	Nintendo EAD	Nintendo
6.	Madden NFL 2001	EA Tiburon	Electronic Arts
7.	The Sims	Maxis	Electronic Arts
8.	Diablo II	Blizzard North	Blizzard Entertainment
9.	Pokémon Yellow	Game Freak	Nintendo
10	Perfect Dark	Rare	Rare

=== 2001 ===
Madden NFL 2002 was the best-selling game of 2001.

Rank	Title	Developer	Publisher
1.	Madden NFL 2002	EA Tiburon	Electronic Arts
2.	Grand Theft Auto III	DMA Design	Rockstar Games
3.	Tony Hawk's Pro Skater 2	Neversoft	Activision
4.	Tony Hawk's Pro Skater 3	Neversoft	Activision
5.	Harry Potter and the Sorcerer's Stone	Argonaut Games	Electronic Arts
6.	Metal Gear Solid 2: Sons of Liberty	Konami Computer Entertainment Japan	Konami
7.	Gran Turismo 3: A-Spec	Polyphony Digital	Sony Computer Entertainment
8.	The Sims	Maxis	Electronic Arts
9.	Pokémon Gold/Silver	Game Freak	Nintendo
10	Pokémon Stadium 2	Nintendo EAD	Nintendo

=== 2002 ===
Grand Theft Auto: Vice City was the best-selling game of 2002. Five of the 10 best-selling games in the US in 2002 were published by Electronic Arts.

Rank	Title	Developer	Publisher
1.	Grand Theft Auto: Vice City	Rockstar North	Rockstar Games
2.	Madden NFL 2003	EA Tiburon, Budcat Creations	Electronic Arts
3.	Grand Theft Auto III	DMA Design	Rockstar Games
4.	Spider-Man	Treyarch	Activision
5.	Medal of Honor: Frontline	EA Los Angeles	Electronic Arts
6.	Harry Potter and the Chamber of Secrets	EA UK	Electronic Arts
7.	Tony Hawk's Pro Skater 4	Neversoft	Activision
8.	Kingdom Hearts	Square	Square Electronic Arts
9.	NCAA Football 2003	EA Tiburon	Electronic Arts
10.	The Lord of the Rings: The Two Towers	Stormfront Studios	Electronic Arts

=== 2003 ===
Madden NFL 2004 was the best-selling game of 2003.

Rank	Title	Developer	Publisher
1.	Madden NFL 2004	EA Tiburon	Electronic Arts
2.	Need for Speed: Underground	EA Black Box	Electronic Arts
3.	Pokémon Ruby/Sapphire	Game Freak	Nintendo
4.	Enter the Matrix	Shiny Entertainment	Infogrames
5.	Tony Hawk's Underground	Neversoft	Activision
6.	The Sims	Maxis	Electronic Arts
7.	True Crime: Streets of LA	Luxoflux	Activision
8.	Medal of Honor: Rising Sun	EA Los Angeles	Electronic Arts
9.	NCAA Football 2004	EA Tiburon	Electronic Arts
10	The Legend of Zelda: The Wind Waker	Nintendo EAD	Nintendo

=== 2004 ===
Grand Theft Auto: San Andreas was the best-selling game of 2004.

Rank	Title	Developer	Publisher
1.	Grand Theft Auto: San Andreas	Rockstar North	Rockstar Games
2.	Halo 2	Bungie	Microsoft Game Studios
3.	Madden NFL 2005	EA Tiburon	Electronic Arts
4.	Need for Speed: Underground 2	EA Black Box	Electronic Arts
5.	Spider-Man 2	Treyarch	Activision
6.	Pokémon FireRed/LeafGreen	Game Freak	Nintendo
7.	NCAA Football 2005	EA Tiburon	Electronic Arts
8.	Star Wars: Battlefront	Pandemic Studios	LucasArts
9.	NBA Live 2005	EA Canada	Electronic Arts
10	MVP Baseball 2004	EA Canada	Electronic Arts

=== 2005 ===
Madden NFL 06 was the best-selling game of 2005.

Rank	Title	Developer	Publisher
1.	Madden NFL 06	EA Tiburon	Electronic Arts
2.	Star Wars: Battlefront II	Pandemic Studios	LucasArts
3.	Call of Duty 2	Infinity Ward	Activision
4.	Need for Speed: Most Wanted	EA Canada, EA Black Box	Electronic Arts
5.	Star Wars: Episode III – Revenge of the Sith	The Collective, LucasArts	LucasArts
6.	NCAA Football 06	EA Tiburon	Electronic Arts
7.	Gran Turismo 4	Polyphony Digital	Sony Computer Entertainment
8.	Grand Theft Auto: San Andreas	Rockstar North	Rockstar Games
9.	NBA Live 06	EA Canada	Electronic Arts
10	LEGO Star Wars	Traveller's Tales	Eidos Interactive

=== 2006 ===
Madden NFL 07 was the best-selling game of 2006.

Rank	Title	Developer	Publisher
1.	Madden NFL 07	EA Tiburon	Electronic Arts
2.	Gears of War	Epic Games	Microsoft Game Studios
3.	The Elder Scrolls IV: Oblivion	Bethesda Game Studios	Bethesda Softworks
4.	NCAA Football 07	EA Tiburon	Electronic Arts
5.	Guitar Hero II	Harmonix	Activision
6.	Lego Star Wars II: The Original Trilogy	Traveller's Tales	LucasArts
7.	Call of Duty 3	Treyarch	Activision
8.	Need for Speed: Carbon	EA Black Box	Electronic Arts
9.	Kingdom Hearts II	Square Enix PDD1	Square Enix
10	Fight Night Round 3	EA Chicago	Electronic Arts

=== 2007 ===
Halo 3 was the best-selling game of 2007.

Rank	Title	Developer	Publisher	Sales
1.	Halo 3	Bungie	Microsoft Game Studios	4,820,000
2.	Wii Play	Nintendo EAD	Nintendo	4,120,000
3.	Call of Duty 4: Modern Warfare	Infinity Ward	Activision	3,040,000
4.	Guitar Hero III: Legends of Rock	Neversoft	Activision	2,720,000
5.	Super Mario Galaxy	Nintendo EAD	Nintendo	2,520,000
6.	Pokémon Diamond/Pearl	Game Freak	Nintendo	2,480,000
7.	Madden NFL 08	EA Tiburon	Electronic Arts	1,900,000
8.	Guitar Hero II	Harmonix	Activision	1,890,000
9.	Assassin's Creed	Ubisoft Montreal	Ubisoft	1,870,000
10.	Mario Party 8	Nintendo EAD	Nintendo	1,820,000

=== 2008 ===
Wii Play was the best-selling game of 2008.

Rank	Title	Developer	Publisher	Sales
1.	Wii Play	Nintendo EAD	Nintendo	5,280,000
2.	Grand Theft Auto IV	Rockstar North	Take-Two Interactive	5,180,000
3.	Mario Kart Wii	Nintendo EAD	Nintendo	5,000,000
4.	Wii Fit	Nintendo EAD	Nintendo	4,530,000
5.	Super Smash Bros. Brawl	Sora Ltd, Game Arts	Nintendo	4,170,000
6.	Call of Duty: World at War	Treyarch	Activision Blizzard	2,750,000
7.	Gears of War 2	Epic Games	Xbox Game Studios	2,310,000
8.	Madden NFL 09	EA Tiburon	Electronic Arts	1,870,000
9.	Metal Gear Solid 4: Guns of the Patriots	Kojima Productions	Konami	1,850,000
10.	Mario Kart DS	Nintendo EAD	Nintendo	1,650,000

=== 2009 ===
Call of Duty: Modern Warfare 2 was the best-selling game of 2009.

Rank	Title	Developer	Publisher	Sales
1.	Call of Duty: Modern Warfare 2	Infinity Ward	Activision Blizzard	5,830,000
2.	Wii Sports Resort	Nintendo EAD	Nintendo	4,220,000+
3.	New Super Mario Bros. Wii	Nintendo EAD	Nintendo	4,220,000
4.	Wii Fit	Nintendo EAD	Nintendo	3,500,000+
5.	Wii Fit Plus	Nintendo EAD	Nintendo	3,136,100+
6.	Mario Kart Wii	Nintendo EAD	Nintendo	3,136,100
7.	Wii Play	Nintendo EAD	Nintendo	3,110,000
8.	Call of Duty: Modern Warfare 2	Infinity Ward	Activision Blizzard	3,020,000
9.	Halo 3: ODST	Bungie	Microsoft Game Studios	2,000,000+
10.	Pokémon Platinum	Game Freak	Nintendo	1,900,000+

== 2010s ==
=== 2010 ===
Call of Duty: Black Ops was the best-selling game of 2010.

Rank	Title	Developer	Publisher
1.	Call of Duty: Black Ops	Treyarch	Activision Blizzard
2.	Madden NFL 11	EA Tiburon	Electronic Arts
3.	Halo: Reach	Bungie	Microsoft Game Studios
4.	New Super Mario Bros. Wii	Nintendo EAD	Nintendo
5.	Red Dead Redemption	Rockstar San Diego	Take-Two Interactive
6.	Wii Fit Plus	Nintendo EAD	Nintendo
7.	Just Dance 2	Ubisoft Paris, Ubisoft Milan	Ubisoft
8.	Call of Duty: Modern Warfare 2	Infinity Ward	Activision Blizzard
9.	Assassin's Creed: Brotherhood	Ubisoft Montreal	Ubisoft
10.	NBA 2K11	Visual Concepts	Take-Two Interactive

=== 2011 ===
Call of Duty: Modern Warfare 3 was the best-selling game of 2011, followed by The Elder Scrolls V: Skyrim and Madden NFL 12.

Rank	Title	Developer	Publisher
1.	Call of Duty: Modern Warfare 3	Infinity Ward, Sledgehammer Games	Activision Blizzard
2.	The Elder Scrolls V: Skyrim	Bethesda Game Studios	Bethesda Softworks
3.	Madden NFL 12	EA Tiburon	Electronic Arts
4.	Battlefield 3	DICE	Electronic Arts
5.	Call of Duty: Black Ops	Treyarch	Activision Blizzard
6.	Just Dance 3	Ubisoft Paris, Ubisoft Reflections, Ubisoft Montreal	Ubisoft
7.	Gears of War 3	Epic Games	Microsoft Studios
8.	Batman: Arkham City	Rocksteady Studios	Warner Bros. Games
9.	Pokémon Black/White	Game Freak	Nintendo
10.	Assassin's Creed Revelations	Ubisoft Montreal	Ubisoft

=== 2012 ===
Call of Duty: Black Ops II was the best-selling game of 2012.

Rank	Title	Developer	Publisher
1.	Call of Duty: Black Ops II	Treyarch	Activision Blizzard
2.	Madden NFL 13	EA Tiburon	Electronic Arts
3.	Halo 4	343 Industries	Microsoft Studios
4.	Assassin's Creed III	Ubisoft Montreal	Ubisoft
5.	Just Dance 4	Ubisoft Paris, Ubisoft Milan	Ubisoft
6.	NBA 2K13	Visual Concepts	Take-Two Interactive
7.	Borderlands 2	Gearbox Software	Take-Two Interactive
8.	Call of Duty: Modern Warfare 3	Infinity Ward, Sledgehammer Games	Activision Blizzard
9.	Lego Batman 2: DC Super Heroes	Traveller's Tales	Warner Bros. Games
10.	FIFA 13	EA Vancouver	Electronic Arts

=== 2013 ===
Grand Theft Auto V was the best-selling game of 2013. The game became the fastest-selling entertainment product in history three days after its release.

Rank	Title	Developer	Publisher
1.	Grand Theft Auto V	Rockstar North	Take-Two Interactive
2.	Call of Duty: Ghosts	Infinity Ward	Activision Blizzard
3.	Madden NFL 25	EA Tiburon	Electronic Arts
4.	Battlefield 4	DICE	Electronic Arts
5.	Assassin's Creed IV: Black Flag	Ubisoft Montreal	Ubisoft
6.	NBA 2K14	Visual Concepts	Take-Two Interactive
7.	Call of Duty: Black Ops II	Treyarch	Activision Blizzard
8.	Just Dance 2014	Ubisoft Paris, Ubisoft Millan	Ubisoft
9.	Minecraft	Mojang Studios	Mojang Studios
10.	Disney Infinity	Avalanche Software	Disney Interactive Studios

=== 2014 ===
The best-selling game of 2014 was Call of Duty: Advanced Warfare.

Rank	Title	Developer	Publisher
1.	Call of Duty: Advanced Warfare	Sledgehammer Games	Activision Blizzard
2.	Madden NFL 15	EA Tiburon	Electronic Arts
3.	Destiny	Bungie	Activision Blizzard
4.	Grand Theft Auto V	Rockstar North	Take-Two Interactive
5.	Minecraft	Mojang Studios	Mojang Studios, Xbox Game Studios
6.	Super Smash Bros. for Wii U	Bandai Namco Studios, Sora Ltd.	Nintendo
7.	NBA 2K15	Visual Concepts	Take-Two Interactive
8.	Watch Dogs	Ubisoft Montreal	Ubisoft
9.	FIFA 15	EA Vancouver	Electronic Arts
10.	Call of Duty: Ghosts	Infinity Ward	Activision Blizzard

=== 2015 ===
The best-selling game of 2015 was Call of Duty: Black Ops III.

Rank	Title	Developer	Publisher
1.	Call of Duty: Black Ops III	Treyarch	Activision Blizzard
2.	Madden NFL 16	EA Tiburon	Electronic Arts
3.	Fallout 4	Bethesda Game Studios	Bethesda Softworks
4.	Star Wars Battlefront	DICE	Electronic Arts
5.	Grand Theft Auto V	Rockstar North	Take-Two Interactive
6.	NBA 2K16	Visual Concepts	Take-Two Interactive
7.	Minecraft	Mojang Studios	Xbox Game Studios
8.	FIFA 16	EA Vancouver, EA Romania	Electronic Arts
9.	Mortal Kombat X	NetherRealm Studios	Warner Bros. Games
10.	Call of Duty: Advanced Warfare	Sledgehammer Games	Activision Blizzard

=== 2016 ===
The best-selling game of 2016 was Call of Duty: Infinite Warfare. Among the top ten best-selling games in 2016, eight were multiplayer games and the other two had multiplayer modes. Among the ten titles, three were published by Activision Blizzard, three by Electronic Arts, two by Take-Two Interactive, and one each by Ubisoft and Square Enix.

Rank	Title	Developer	Publisher
1.	Call of Duty: Infinite Warfare	Infinity Ward	Activision Blizzard
2.	Battlefield 1	DICE	Electronic Arts
3.	Tom Clancy's The Division	Massive Entertainment	Ubisoft
4.	NBA 2K17	Visual Concepts	Take-Two Interactive
5.	Madden NFL 17	EA Tiburon	Electronic Arts
6.	Grand Theft Auto V	Rockstar North	Take-Two Interactive
7.	Overwatch	Blizzard Entertainment	Activision Blizzard
8.	Call of Duty: Black Ops III	Treyarch	Activision Blizzard
9.	FIFA 17	EA Vancouver, EA Romania	Electronic Arts
10.	Final Fantasy XV	Square Enix Business Division 2	Square Enix

=== 2017 ===
The best-selling game of 2017 was Call of Duty: WWII, followed by NBA 2K18 and Destiny 2. PUBG is absent from the list due to PUBG Corporation not sharing sales data with the NPD.

Rank	Title	Developer	Publisher	Note
1.	Call of Duty: WWII	Sledgehammer Games	Activision Blizzard	
2.	NBA 2K18	Visual Concepts	Take-Two Interactive	
3.	Destiny 2	Bungie	Activision Blizzard	Digital sales incomplete
4.	Madden NFL 18	EA Tiburon	Electronic Arts	
5.	The Legend of Zelda: Breath of the Wild	Nintendo EPD	Nintendo	Digital sales not included
6.	Grand Theft Auto V	Rockstar North	Take-Two Interactive	
7.	Tom Clancy's Ghost Recon Wildlands	Ubisoft Paris, Ubisoft Milan	Ubisoft	
8.	Star Wars Battlefront II	DICE	Electronic Arts	Digital sales incomplete
9.	Super Mario Odyssey	Nintendo EPD	Nintendo	Digital sales not included
10.	Mario Kart 8 Deluxe	Nintendo EPD	Nintendo	Digital sales not included

=== 2018 ===
Red Dead Redemption 2 was the best-selling game of 2018, Rockstar Games' first game in over 5 years. For the first time since 2013, the best-selling game of the year wasn't a Call of Duty game.

Rank	Title	Developer	Publisher	Note
1.	Red Dead Redemption 2	Rockstar Games	Take-Two Interactive	
2.	Call of Duty: Black Ops 4	Treyarch	Activision Blizzard	PC sales not included
3.	NBA 2K19	Visual Concepts	Take-Two Interactive	
4.	Madden NFL 19	EA Tiburon	Electronic Arts	PC sales not included
5.	Super Smash Bros. Ultimate	Bandai Namco Studios, Sora Ltd.	Nintendo	Digital sales not included
6.	Marvel's Spider-Man	Insomniac Games	Sony Interactive Entertainment	
7.	Far Cry 5	Ubisoft Montreal, Ubisoft Toronto	Ubisoft	
8.	God of War	Santa Monica Studio	Sony Interactive Entertainment	
9.	Monster Hunter: World	Capcom	Capcom	
10.	Assassin's Creed Odyssey	Ubisoft Quebec	Ubisoft	

=== 2019 ===
The best-selling game of 2019 was Call of Duty: Modern Warfare.

Rank	Title	Developer	Publisher	Note
1.	Call of Duty: Modern Warfare	Infinity Ward	Activision Blizzard	
2.	NBA 2K20	Visual Concepts	Take-Two Interactive	
3.	Madden NFL 20	EA Tiburon	Electronic Arts	
4.	Borderlands 3	Gearbox Software	Take-Two Interactive	
5.	Mortal Kombat 11	NetherRealm Studios	Warner Bros. Games	
6.	Star Wars Jedi: Fallen Order	Respawn Entertainment	Electronic Arts	
7.	Super Smash Bros. Ultimate	Bandai Namco Studios, Sora Ltd.	Nintendo	
8.	Kingdom Hearts III	Square Enix Business Division 3	Square Enix	
9.	Tom Clancy's The Division 2	Massive Entertainment	Ubisoft	
10.	Mario Kart 8 Deluxe	Nintendo EPD	Nintendo	Digital sales not included

== 2020s ==
=== 2020 ===
Top selling game of 2020 was Call of Duty: Black Ops Cold War, followed by Call of Duty: Modern Warfare and NBA 2K21. Grand Theft Auto V returns to the Top-10 after three years of absence.

Rank	Title	Developer	Publisher	Note
1.	Call of Duty: Black Ops Cold War	Treyarch, Raven Software	Activision Blizzard	
2.	Call of Duty: Modern Warfare	Infinity Ward	Activision Blizzard	
3.	NBA 2K21	Visual Concepts	Take-Two Interactive	
4.	Animal Crossing: New Horizons	Nintendo EPD	Nintendo	Digital sales not included
5.	Madden NFL 21	EA Tiburon	Electronic Arts	
6.	Assassin's Creed Valhalla	Ubisoft Montreal	Ubisoft	
7.	The Last of Us Part II	Naughty Dog	Sony Interactive Entertainment	
8.	Grand Theft Auto V	Rockstar North	Take-Two Interactive	
9.	Ghost of Tsushima	Sucker Punch	Sony Interactive Entertainment	
10.	Doom Eternal	id Software	Bethesda Softworks	

=== 2021 ===
Call of Duty: Vanguard was the best-selling game of 2021. Two of the top 10 best-selling games of 2021 were Activision Blizzard games.

Rank	Title	Developer	Publisher	Note
1.	Call of Duty: Vanguard	Sledgehammer Games	Activision Blizzard	
2.	Call of Duty: Black Ops Cold War	Treyarch, Raven Software	Activision Blizzard	
3.	Madden NFL 22	EA Tiburon	Electronic Arts	
4.	Pokémon Brilliant Diamond and Shining Pearl	ILCA	Nintendo	Digital sales not included
5.	Battlefield 2042	DICE	Electronic Arts	
6.	Marvel's Spider-Man: Miles Morales	Insomniac Games	Sony Interactive Entertainment	
7.	Mario Kart 8 Deluxe	Nintendo EPD	Nintendo	Digital sales not included
8.	Resident Evil Village	Capcom	Capcom	
9.	MLB The Show 21	San Diego Studio	Sony Interactive Entertainment, MLBAM	Digital sales incomplete
10.	Super Mario 3D World + Bowser's Fury	Nintendo EPD	Nintendo	Digital sales not included

=== 2022 ===
Call of Duty: Modern Warfare II from Activision Blizzard was the best-selling video game in the United States in 2022. The game outperformed the previous record-holders for the series, Call of Duty: Modern Warfare 3 from 2011 and Black Ops II from 2012.

Rank	Title	Developer	Publisher	Note
1.	Call of Duty: Modern Warfare II	Infinity Ward	Activision Blizzard	
2.	Elden Ring	FromSoftware	Bandai Namco	
3.	Madden NFL 23	EA Orlando	Electronic Arts	
4.	God of War Ragnarök	Santa Monica Studio	Sony Interactive Entertainment	
5.	Lego Star Wars: The Skywalker Saga	Traveller's Tales	Warner Bros. Games	
6.	Pokémon Scarlet and Violet	Game Freak	Nintendo	Digital sales not included
7.	FIFA 23	EA Vancouver, EA Romania	Electronic Arts	
8.	Pokémon Legends: Arceus	Game Freak	Nintendo	Digital sales not included
9.	Horizon Forbidden West	Guerrilla Games	Sony Interactive Entertainment, MLBAM	
10.	MLB The Show 22	San Diego Studio	Sony Interactive Entertainment, MLBAM	Digital sales incomplete

=== 2023 ===
Hogwarts Legacy from Warner Bros. Games was the best-selling video game in the United States in 2023. For the first time in 14 years, the best-selling video game in the US was not a game from Activision or Rockstar Games. However, due to the NPD being unable to track Nintendo digital sales data, only physical sales are counted for The Legend of Zelda: Tears of the Kingdom. The NPD is also unable to track Battle.net sales for Diablo IV. Call of Duty finished 2023 as the best-selling video game series in the US market for the 15th consecutive year.

Rank	Title	Developer	Publisher	Note
1.	Hogwarts Legacy	Avalanche Software	Warner Bros. Games	
2.	Call of Duty: Modern Warfare III	Sledgehammer Games	Activision Blizzard	
3.	Madden NFL 24	EA Orlando	Electronic Arts	
4.	Marvel's Spider-Man 2	Insomniac Games	Sony Interactive Entertainment	
5.	The Legend of Zelda: Tears of the Kingdom	Nintendo EPD	Nintendo	Digital sales not included
6.	Diablo IV	Blizzard Entertainment	Activision Blizzard	Battle.net sales not included
7.	Call of Duty: Modern Warfare II	Infinity Ward	Activision Blizzard	
8.	Mortal Kombat 1	NetherRealm Studios	Warner Bros. Games	
9.	Star Wars Jedi: Survivor	Respawn Entertainment	Electronic Arts	
10	EA Sports FC 24	EA Vancouver	Electronic Arts	

=== 2024 ===
Call of Duty: Black Ops 6 was the best-selling video game in the United States in 2024.

Rank	Title	Developer	Publisher	Note
1.	Call of Duty: Black Ops 6	Treyarch, Raven Software	Microsoft	
2.	EA Sports College Football 25	EA Orlando	Electronic Arts	
3.	Helldivers 2	Arrowhead Game Studios	Sony	
4.	Dragon Ball: Sparking! Zero	Spike Chunsoft	Bandai Namco Entertainment	
5.	NBA 2K25	Visual Concepts	Take-Two Interactive	
6.	Madden NFL 25	EA Orlando	Electronic Arts	
7.	Call of Duty: Modern Warfare III	Sledgehammer Games	Microsoft	
8.	EA Sports FC 25	EA Vancouver, EA Romania	Electronic Arts	
9.	Elden Ring	FromSoftware	Bandai Namco Entertainment	
10.	EA Sports MVP Bundle	EA Orlando	Electronic Arts	Bundle of Madden NFL 25 and College Football 25

=== 2025 ===
Battlefield 6 was the best-selling video game in the United States in 2025.

Rank	Title	Developer	Publisher
1.	Battlefield 6	Battlefield Studios	Electronic Arts
2.	NBA 2K26	Visual Concepts	Take-Two Interactive
3.	Borderlands 4	Gearbox Software	Take-Two Interactive
4.	Monster Hunter Wilds	Capcom	Capcom
5.	Call of Duty: Black Ops 7	Treyarch, Raven Software	Microsoft
6.	Madden NFL 26	EA Orlando	Electronic Arts
7.	EA Sports College Football 26	EA Orlando	Electronic Arts
8.	EA Sports FC 26	EA Vancouver, EA Romania	Electronic Arts
9.	The Elder Scrolls IV: Oblivion Remastered	Virtuos, Bethesda Game Studios	Microsoft
10	Call of Duty: Black Ops 6	Treyarch, Raven Software	Microsoft

=== 2026 ===
The best-selling video games in the United States in 2026 (as of November).

Rank	Title	Developer	Publisher
1.	Grand Theft Auto VI	Rockstar North	Rockstar Games
2.	Resident Evil Requiem	Capcom	Capcom
3.	007 First Light	IO Interactive	IO Interactive
4.	Crimson Desert	Pearl Abyss	Pearl Abyss
5.	MLB The Show 26	San Diego Studio	Sony, MLBAM
6.	Call of Duty: Black Ops II (PS4/PS5 port)	Treyarch, Iron Galaxy	Microsoft
7.	Forza Horizon 6	Playground Games	Microsoft
8.	Tomodachi Life: Living the Dream	Nintendo EPD	Nintendo
9.	EA Sports FC 27	EA Vancouver, EA Romania	Electronic Arts
10.	The Legend of Zelda: Ocarina of Time	Nintendo EPD	Nintendo

== See also ==
- Video games in the United States
- History of video games
- List of best-selling video games
