= EA Sports College Football =

- Genres: Sports (American football)
- Developer: EA Sports
- Publisher: Electronic Arts
- Platforms: Super Nintendo Entertainment System, Sega Genesis, Sega CD; PlayStation, Windows; PlayStation 2, Xbox, GameCube; Xbox 360, PlayStation Portable, PlayStation 3, Wii, iOS; PlayStation 5, Xbox Series X/S, Android
- First release: Bill Walsh College Football; June 1993
- Latest release: EA Sports College Football 27; July 9, 2026

EA Sports College Football (formerly known as Bill Walsh College Football, College Football USA and NCAA Football) is an American football video game series developed by EA Sports in which players control and compete against current Division I FBS college teams. It serves as a college football counterpart to the Madden NFL series. The series began in 1993 with the release of Bill Walsh College Football. EA eventually acquired the licensing rights to the NCAA name and officially rechristened the series with the release of NCAA Football 98.

In July 2013, the NCAA announced that it would not renew its licensing contract with Electronic Arts because of an ongoing legal dispute regarding the use of player likenesses in the games. However, this contract only covered the use of the NCAA name and related logos, not those of individual schools and conferences, which are negotiated individually or through the Collegiate Licensing Company. The CLC concurrently announced that it would extend its existing licensing deal with EA through 2017, ensuring that EA Sports could continue the series without the NCAA branding and EA made plans to continue the series under the old College Football name. However, the series was placed on hiatus in September 2013, following three major conferences pulling their trademark licenses from EA, and uncertainties surrounding the results of lawsuits involving the use of player likenesses in-game.

In February 2021, Electronic Arts announced that the series would be returning for next-gen platforms no earlier than summer 2023. During an interview with ESPN.com in November 2022, an EA Sports executive revealed that the game would be released in mid-2024 "because of the enormous undertaking of creating the game from scratch".

Following the commercial success of the franchise's revival, EA Sports announced the continued annualization of the series. According to industry reports in January 2026, the series saw a 20 percent increase in active users compared to the previous year.

== Yearly releases (1993–2014, 2024–present) ==
=== Bill Walsh College Football ===
Bill Walsh College Football was released in June 1993 on 4th generation video game consoles, such as the Sega Genesis.

Bill Walsh College Football featured the top 24 college football teams from 1992 and 24 of the all-time greatest teams since 1978. While no actual players were named and no official team logos used, colleges were listed by city and players identified by number. Play modes include exhibition, playoffs, and all-time playoffs. Sixty-eight classic college plays were available, including the triple option, student body, and wishbone.

Other options and features include automatic or manual-pass catch mode, audible, reverse angle replay, onside kicks, four weather conditions (fair, windy, rain, and snow), three different quarter lengths (5, 10, and 15 minutes), and a hurry-up offense.

The Bill Walsh endorsement was meant to parallel John Madden's endorsement of Madden NFL; Walsh at the time was head coach of the Stanford Cardinal football team.

=== Bill Walsh College Football '95 ===
Bill Walsh College Football '95 was the second installment of the college football franchise and the first to have a year.

The game featured 36 Division I-A teams, a windowless passing mode, customizable seasons from one to sixteen weeks, and complete statistical tracking throughout the season. Players could choose either a playoff system or bowl games with fictional names: Maple Bowl, Palm Bowl, Pecan Bowl, and Redwood Bowl.

Bill Walsh College Football 95 also provided 36 new plays and formations including the Wishbone, Veer, Tee Offense, and 4-4 D.

=== College Football USA 96 ===
The series was renamed College Football USA 96, and was the first version to feature all (108 at the time) Division l-A teams. It was also the first in the series to feature real bowl games (Orange, Sugar, Fiesta, and Rose). Players could play an entire 11-game season (or shorter if desired) before advancing to one of the bowl games.

There were 400 plays from which to choose, and a new passing mode allowed players to select from five receivers on every play. Other new features and options included the following: four-player mode, three different game lengths, substitutions, injuries, audible, fake snaps, spins, hurdles, dives, blocked kicks, interceptions, and laterals

=== College Football USA 97 ===
College Football USA 97 was the fourth installment of the series. While the game was published for the Genesis by EA Sports as usual, the Super NES version was instead published by THQ. The game featured University of Nebraska quarterback Tommie Frazier on the cover.

=== NCAA Football 98 ===
NCAA Football 98 was released in 1997. The game featured University of Florida quarterback and Heisman Trophy winner Danny Wuerffel on the cover.

=== NCAA Football 99 ===
NCAA Football 99 was the sixth edition of the game. The game featured University of Michigan cornerback and Heisman Trophy winner Charles Woodson on the cover. Its tagline read Desire+Pride=Victory!.

The game featured all 112 Division I-A teams at the time and also featured 3D, polygon-rendered players for the first time in the franchise's history. Additional features included the ability to create players, edit player names, sixty fight songs and crowd chants. Over eighty historical teams were added to the game, as well. The Heisman Memorial Trophy replaces the 'EA Sports MVP" trophy and other awards are given out. Recruiting is simple and done in a serpentine draft system. The Rose Bowl, Cotton Bowl, Fiesta Bowl and Sugar Bowl are now playable, and the other Bowls played have EA Sports as the sponsor. Created players from this game can be imported to the title Madden NFL 99. It featured no commentary by booth announcers; instead a PA announcer provides the commentary. Unlike the current games in this franchise, NCAA 99 featured an optional 16 team playoff at the end of the season in dynasty mode.

=== NCAA Football 2000 ===
NCAA Football 2000, released only for the PlayStation, featured University of Texas running back and Heisman Trophy winner Ricky Williams on the cover.

The game included all 114 Division I-A schools and 26 from Division I-AA. It also featured new 3D polygon-rendered players, which are fully displayed in multiple camera angles during gameplay.

Other notable additions include coaching tips, 23 bowls (up from four), the ability to edit new plays, and the official Heisman Trophy award.

=== NCAA Football 2001 ===
NCAA Football 2001, released only for the PlayStation, featured University of Alabama running back Shaun Alexander on the cover.

This version included Create-a-player, Create-a-school, Custom League (up to eight teams, double round-robin, plus playoff), Custom Tournament (up to 16 teams, double elimination), as well as fully customizable Season/Dynasty schedules. This was also the final installment which offered a playoff at the end of the season in dynasty mode (24 teams).

=== NCAA Football 2002 ===
NCAA Football 2002, released only for the PlayStation 2, featured Florida State quarterback and Heisman Trophy winner Chris Weinke on the cover.

This was the first version released for PlayStation 2; it lacked features (such as Custom League, Custom Tournament, and Create-a-school) that were present in the previous year's PlayStation edition.

The game featured a new Campus Cards rewards system, which allowed players to unlock special features in the game such as historical teams or special stadiums. It was also the first entry in the season to rank the top 25 teams in the nation.

=== NCAA Football 2003 ===
NCAA Football 2003, released for the PlayStation 2, GameCube, and Xbox, featured University of Oregon quarterback Joey Harrington on the cover.

New features in this version included over 200 licensed fight songs, 3D cheerleaders and 144 different schools.

Dynasty mode was enhanced with the ability to redshirt a player and schedule non-conference games before each season. Trophies and awards, modeled after real-life college football awards, was another feature new to this version. Players could win trophies by playing games and could add them to a personal collection which is shown off in a trophy room. These awards include the Heisman, Coach of the Year and Bowl-specific trophies. The game featured 23 different rivalry trophies that were created to represent their real-life counterparts.

Create-A-School mode returned in this edition of the game after being absent from the previous year. The game also featured a customizable interface for the first time. Player could choose their favorite teams and the game interface would be based around the team's fight song, mascot, logos and school colors.

=== NCAA Football 2004 ===
NCAA Football 2004, released for the PlayStation 2, GameCube, and Xbox, featured University of Southern California quarterback and Heisman Trophy winner Carson Palmer on the cover.

This edition featured the return of gameplay modes seen in previous versions such as Dynasty Mode.

The College Classics mode was introduced in this version and allowed players to replay classic games in college football history. New tackling animations and more realistic zone defenses were also included.

=== NCAA Football 2005 ===
NCAA Football 2005, the last game in the series to have the full year on the cover and released for the PlayStation 2, GameCube, and Xbox, featured University of Pittsburgh wide receiver Larry Fitzgerald on the cover.

This version introduced more fan interaction in the game. The home team's defense can incite the crowd to make noise, making it difficult for the offense to hear the quarterback's audibles. This feature, dubbed "home field advantage", allowed stadium influence and energy to swing a game's momentum if strong enough. The game ranked the "Top 25 Toughest Places to Play", which included famous stadiums such as Florida's "Swamp" and LSU's "Death Valley", where this feature would be felt more strongly.

The new "Match-Up Stick" feature allowed players to match up more experienced and skilled players on younger, less-talented ones to exploit matchup problems.

All Division I-A schools were included in the game along with more than 70 I-AA schools. Signature fan celebrations, such as the "Gator Chomp" and "Texas Hook 'Em Horns" were included.

=== NCAA Football 06 ===
NCAA Football 06 has features that include the Dynasty mode, wherein the player act as a team's head coach, both on and off the field. Aside from weekly games, the player also controls recruiting freshman for the next year's season; new to the 2006 version is in-season recruiting.

Another new feature in the 2006 game is the Race for the Heisman mode, in which the player takes on the role of a single player attempting to win the Heisman Trophy. Race for the Heisman begins with the user selecting which position they want their character to be. The player then completes a workout for college scouts and you are offered scholarships to three different schools. The quality of football programs that offer scholarships depends on how well the player did in the workout. The player can either choose to accept one of the scholarships or walk on at any Division I school. After selecting what school to play for the player is automatically placed in the starting line up. Year after year the player's attributes increase depending on the previous seasons performance with the ultimate goal of winning the Heisman Trophy.

Desmond Howard, a Heisman-winning player from the University of Michigan, is on the cover. This is a slight break in tradition as the NCAA Football series traditionally featured an NFL rookie on the cover of the game, with an action shot of him wearing his college jersey from the previous year. The game was released for the PlayStation 2 and Xbox.

=== NCAA Football 07 ===
NCAA Football 07 was released on July 18, 2006, and was the series' first release on both the Xbox 360 and PSP. University of Southern California running back and Heisman Trophy winner Reggie Bush is featured on the game's cover. FCS teams were not featured on next gen consoles, but were available still on previous gen consoles.

This version of the game utilized a feature called Turn the Tide, which consisted of a momentum meter on the score graphic at the top or bottom of the screen. A boost in momentum for a team would increase the performance of all players and boost their attributes by a varying amount.

This version also included spring drills, an update to the Race for the Heisman mode called Campus Legend (which plays more like NFL Superstar mode in Madden), ESPN integration, and a spring game in Dynasty and Campus Legend modes.

=== NCAA Football 08 ===
NCAA Football 08 was released on July 17, 2007. The cover athlete is Boise State University quarterback Jared Zabransky.

Some of the new features for this version include Leadership Control, which allows players who perform well to "lead by example" and control the action on the field and increase their sphere of influence by improving their players' personal ratings on each big play. The game also features a new and deeper recruiting system and an all-new Campus Legend mode. This was the first version of the game released on the PlayStation 3.

=== NCAA Football 09 ===
NCAA Football 09 was released July 15, 2008. It was released on all 7th generation consoles, including, for the first and only time, the Wii. The covers featured the following college football figures:

- PlayStation 2 — DeSean Jackson, wide receiver/return specialist, California
- PlayStation 3 — Matt Ryan, quarterback, Boston College
- PSP — Owen Schmitt, fullback, West Virginia
- Wii — Sparty, mascot, Michigan State
- Xbox 360 — Darren McFadden, running back, Arkansas

=== NCAA Football 10 ===
NCAA Football 10 was released on July 14, 2009. The covers feature the following former college players:

- PlayStation 2 — Brian Orakpo, defensive end/linebacker, Texas
- PlayStation 3 — Brian Johnson, quarterback, Utah
- PSP — Mark Sanchez, quarterback, USC
- Xbox 360 — Michael Crabtree, wide receiver, Texas Tech

The game added Teambuilder, a feature accessed by the EA Sports Teambuilder website. This would be the replacement for Create-A-School. Teambuilder's website was an online accessible mode, where teams that were made via the site could be downloaded by other users.

=== NCAA Football 11 ===
NCAA Football 11 was released on July 13, 2010. It was released on all next generation consoles, with the exception of the Wii. The cover athlete for all three versions is former Florida quarterback Tim Tebow.

This was the last version of the game released for the PlayStation 2, and the first version released for iOS before EA Sports College Football Mobile fifteen years later.

=== NCAA Football 12 ===
NCAA Football 12 was released on July 12, 2011 on PS3 and Xbox 360. The cover athlete was Heisman Trophy winner Mark Ingram II of the University of Alabama.

=== NCAA Football 13 ===
NCAA Football 13 was released on July 10, 2012. The game's cover features Heisman Trophy winner Robert Griffin III of Baylor, along with another Heisman winner (Barry Sanders from Oklahoma State), who was decided by fan voting. Sanders was picked over Marcus Allen, Doug Flutie, Desmond Howard, Charlie Ward, Andre Ware, Eddie George, and Herschel Walker during the voting process.

=== NCAA Football 14 ===
NCAA Football 14, the final installment in the series prior to its 11-year hiatus, was released on July 9, 2013. The game's cover features former Michigan quarterback Denard Robinson, who was decided by fan voting. Robinson was picked over Eddie Lacy, Kenjon Barner, Jarvis Jones, EJ Manuel, Ryan Swope, John Simon, and Tyler Eifert during the voting process.

=== EA Sports College Football 25 ===
EA Sports College Football 25 was released on July 19, 2024 on PS5 and Xbox Series X/S. It is the first installment in the resumption of the series after an 11-year hiatus. The game's cover features Quinn Ewers, quarterback for the Texas Longhorns; Travis Hunter, wide receiver and cornerback for the Colorado Buffaloes; and Donovan Edwards, running back for the Michigan Wolverines.

=== EA Sports College Football 26 ===
EA Sports College Football 26 was released on July 10, 2025. With Delaware and Missouri State joining the FBS level, they were added to the game. The cover athletes are Alabama's Ryan Coleman-Williams and Ohio State's Jeremiah Smith, both wide receivers.

The game further expanded on features like the NCAA transfer portal and the College Football Playoff.

=== EA Sports College Football 27 ===
EA Sports College Football 27 was released on July 9, 2026. With North Dakota State and Sacramento State joining the FBS level, they were added to the game. Dante Moore, Kewan Lacy, and Malachi Toney appear on the main cover.

It is the first title in the series to be released for Microsoft Windows.

=== EA Sports College Football Mobile ===
A mobile version of the game, called EA Sports College Football Mobile was released on July 9, 2026.

It is the first title in the series to be released for Android, and also as one of the first mobile game to use the Frostbite game engine.

== Cover athletes ==
List of Standard Cover Star
Game	Cover Star		
Game	Name	Team	Position
Bill Walsh College Football ('94)	Bill Walsh	Stanford	Head coach
Bill Walsh College Football '95	Bill Walsh	Stanford	Head coach
College Football USA 96	Generic wide receiver	Kansas State	Wide receiver
College Football USA 96	Generic running back	Michigan	Running back
College Football USA 96	Generic player head	Florida State	Helmet
College Football USA 96	Tommy Trojan	USC	Mascot
College Football USA 96	University of Wisconsin Marching Band	Wisconsin	Marching band
College Football USA 97	Tommie Frazier	Nebraska	Quarterback
NCAA Football 98	Danny Wuerffel	Florida	Quarterback
NCAA Football 99	Charles Woodson	Michigan	Cornerback
NCAA Football 2000	Ricky Williams	Texas	Running back
NCAA Football 2001	Shaun Alexander	Alabama	Running back
NCAA Football 2002	Chris Weinke	Florida State	Quarterback
NCAA Football 2003	Joey Harrington	Oregon	Quarterback
NCAA Football 2004	Carson Palmer	USC	Quarterback
NCAA Football 2005	Larry Fitzgerald	Pittsburgh	Wide receiver
NCAA Football 06	Desmond Howard	Michigan	Wide receiver
NCAA Football 07	Reggie Bush	USC	Running back
NCAA Football 08	Jared Zabransky	Boise State	Quarterback
NCAA Football 09	DeSean Jackson (PS2)	California	Wide receiver
NCAA Football 09	Matt Ryan (PS3)	Boston College	Quarterback
NCAA Football 09	Owen Schmitt (PSP)	West Virginia	Fullback
NCAA Football 09	Sparty (Wii)	Michigan State	Mascot
NCAA Football 09	Darren McFadden (Xbox 360)	Arkansas	Running back
NCAA Football 10	Brian Orakpo (PS2)	Texas	Linebacker
NCAA Football 10	Brian Johnson (PS3)	Utah	Quarterback
NCAA Football 10	Mark Sanchez (PSP)	USC	Quarterback
NCAA Football 10	Michael Crabtree (Xbox 360)	Texas Tech	Wide receiver
NCAA Football 11	Tim Tebow	Florida	Quarterback
NCAA Football 12	Mark Ingram II	Alabama	Running back
NCAA Football 13	Robert Griffin III	Baylor	Quarterback
NCAA Football 13	Barry Sanders	Oklahoma State	Running back
NCAA Football 14	Denard Robinson	Michigan	Quarterback
EA Sports College Football 25	Quinn Ewers	Texas	Quarterback
EA Sports College Football 25	Travis Hunter	Colorado	Cornerback/Wide receiver
EA Sports College Football 25	Donovan Edwards	Michigan	Running back
EA Sports College Football 26	Ryan Coleman-Williams	Alabama	Wide receiver
EA Sports College Football 26	Jeremiah Smith	Ohio State	Wide receiver
EA Sports College Football 27	Dante Moore	Oregon	Quarterback
EA Sports College Football 27	Kewan Lacy	Ole Miss	Running back
EA Sports College Football 27	Malachi Toney	Miami (FL)	Wide receiver

== Future of the series ==
Due to legal disputes between the NCAA, Electronic Arts, college athletes, and others regarding the usage of college athletes' likenesses in video games (which had been barred by the NCAA because of the concept of sport amateurism), the association did not renew its licensing deal with EA. However, the expiration of the license only affected the use of the NCAA's trademarks in the games. Teams and other events are licensed from schools individually or through organizations such as the Collegiate Licensing Company—which announced on the same day that they would extend its own licensing deal with EA through 2017. EA therefore ensured that with its existing deals in place, it would still be able to produce future versions of the franchise without the NCAA license (as it did prior to 1997). EA Sports' executive vice president Andrew Wilson announced that the next edition of the franchise was already in development, and would "[still] feature the college teams, leagues, and all the innovation fans expect from EA Sports."

However, after the SEC, Big Ten, and Pac-12 conferences announced that they would not license their trademarks to EA, the company announced on September 26, 2013 that it would not make a college football game for 2014. EA had plans to continue the series with a focus on user-generated content under the old College Football name, but the planned game was eventually canceled.

During the series' hiatus, Madden sporadically made use of college football teams. Oregon and Texas licensed their team names for the story mode in Madden NFL 18 and Madden NFL 20 included 10 licensed college teams for its career storyline QB1: Face of the Franchise.

NCAA Football 14, the last edition of the game released prior to the series' hiatus, continued to be played by fans, including actual college football players. Unofficial updates have been released to reflect current rosters. On October 29, 2019 the NCAA's board of governors voted unanimously to institute new rules allowing student athletes to profit from the use of their name, image, and likeness. The changes were set to take effect no later than January 2021. This development caused many to speculate that a new NCAA Football game would finally be released in the near future.

=== EA Sports College Football ===
On February 2, 2021, EA Sports announced that the series NCAA Football would return under the name EA Sports College Football, stating on Twitter, "For those who never stopped believing...College Football is coming back." They also released a statement on their website announcing that they had garnered and are utilizing a partnership with the Collegiate Licensing Company, an NCAA licensing group, to bring uniforms, stadiums, traditions and more from over 100 NCAA-affiliated sports teams. At the time, that meant that teams not part of the CLC would not be in the game such as Air Force, Army, Georgia State, Kentucky, New Mexico, Notre Dame, Troy and USC.

Despite this setback, ultimately, on February 22, 2024, EA Sports confirmed in a post on X that all 134 Football Bowl Subdivision (FBS) programs would be featured in EA Sports College Football 25 but the 128 Football Championship Subdivision (FCS) programs would not be included at launch.

On May 16, 2024, EA Sports revealed the main cover for EA Sports College Football 25 and officially confirmed the game would release on July 19, 2024, ahead of a planned full reveal the following day. Following the release of the trailer, EA Sports confirmed that many of its old features from NCAA Football 14 would be brought to College Football 25, such as Team Builder, Road to Glory, and Dynasty.

In a July 2025 video the youtuber SOFTDRINKTV confirmed via a journalist from insider gaming who filed a FOIA request that EA Sports has an exclusive license to produce action simulation video games from the Collegiate Licensing Company.

== Player names ==
During the initial run of the series (1993–2014), players' real names and specific likenesses were not used, unlike the Madden NFL series, which does use real player names and likenesses, and compensates players for the use of their image. This was due to NCAA restrictions on the amateur status of athletes at the time. Additionally, current college players could not be used as cover athletes. Instead, each cover featured a player whose college eligibility ended the season before the game's release, wearing his former college uniform. The only two exceptions were the Wii version of NCAA Football 09, which featured Sparty, the mascot of Michigan State University, on the cover, and NCAA Football 06 when Desmond Howard was featured on the cover striking the Heisman Trophy pose during his career at Michigan, despite not having played for Michigan for more than 15 years.

Although EA Sports did not claim that the players in the game represent real life players, the jersey number, position, height, weight, home state, and ethnicity were all aligned with the real players. Fans of any particular team were sure to recognize their favorite players (for example, in NCAA Football 14, Florida State QB #5 would correspond to Jameis Winston), however actual usage of a player's real name would be in violation of the NCAA's policy regarding student athletes. Amateur "roster makers" would often manually associate player names and will upload a roster file to the built-in roster sharing system. As of NCAA Football 09, EA has put in the EA Locker feature which allows remote roster sharing online through either Xbox Live or PlayStation Network depending on the console.

For the new run of the series starting in 2024, players will be able to have their names in the game, though players may opt out if they refuse to agree to EA's terms. For EA Sports College Football 25, the payment was $600 and a copy of the game in exchange for a player's name and likeness.

== Soundtracks ==
Prior to the release of NCAA Football 06, the only music featured in the game were fight songs of most FBS and FCS colleges featured in the game. These would play at random, however the user-selected "favorite team" would always have their fight song played first whenever the game was first started.

NCAA Football 06 was the first and only entry in the series to include licensed music to keep the series in uniform with other EA Sports releases of the time, such as Madden NFL and the NHL series.

NCAA Football 07 returned to the fight song only format.

NCAA Football 08 added a cinematic theme song to the main menu, with fight songs playing during Dynasty Mode.

NCAA Football 09 allows a new custom stadium sounds feature allowing users to edit what sounds are heard at specific stadiums during events within the game, such as a touchdown, field goal, or timeout. Fans of the teams can now create an authentic experience in each stadium by using copyrighted songs that EA is not allowed to put into the game.

NCAA Football 10 plays ”Tick Tick Boom” by The Hives in the introduction only.

NCAA Football 11 uses the music that is used in ESPN College Football coverage.

Beginning with the release of EA Sports College Football 25, featured in-game music consists of marching band renditions by the EA Sports College Football Marching Band as well as other licensed music. The fight songs off all FBS programs at the time each game was released are included in the soundtrack as well as other school songs, drum cadences and covers of popular music. An original "Campus Clash" main theme was composed for the game series by Kris Bowers, and renditions by the marching bands of Auburn University and the University of South Carolina are respectively included in the soundtracks of EA Sports College Football 26 and 27.
