= Madden NFL 08 =

2007 American football video game

- North American cover art featuring Vince Young
- Developers: EA Tiburon; Exient Entertainment (DS)
- Publisher: EA Sports
- Series: Madden NFL
- Platforms: GameCube; Microsoft Windows; Mobile phone Nintendo DS; Mac OS X PlayStation 2 PlayStation 3 PlayStation Portable; Wii; Xbox; Xbox 360
- Release: August 14, 2007: NA: August 14, 2007; AU: August 23, 2007 (PC, PS2, PSP, X360); EU: August 24, 2007 (DS, PC, PS2, PSP); AU: August 30, 2007 (Wii); EU: August 31, 2007 (Wii, X360); NA: September 1, 2007 (Mac); AS: September 12, 2007 (PS3); JP: September 20, 2007 (PS2, X360); AU: October 4, 2007 (PS3); EU: October 5, 2007 (PS3)
- Genre: Sports
- Modes: Single-player, multiplayer

Madden NFL 08 is a 2007 American football sports video game developed primarily by EA Tiburon and published by EA Sports. Based on the National Football League (NFL), it is the 2007 entry in the Madden NFL series. EA marketed the game around a new "Read and React" system, which used on-field skill icons—called "weapons"—to identify individual player strengths and possible matchups; the game also added Hit Stick 2.0 and a branching animation system for tackles and catches.

Tennessee Titans quarterback Vince Young appears on the North American cover. The game was released in North America on August 14, 2007, for Xbox 360, Wii, PlayStation 3, PlayStation 2, Nintendo DS, PlayStation Portable, Xbox, GameCube, Microsoft Windows, and mobile phones. A Mac OS X version followed after EA delayed its planned August release. A Spanish-language version, with San Diego Chargers defensive end Luis Castillo on the cover and ESPN Deportes announcer Álvaro Martín providing commentary, was released for PlayStation 2 and Xbox 360 in December 2007.

The Xbox 360 and PlayStation 3 versions received generally favorable reviews, while other versions received mixed to generally favorable reviews. According to EA, Madden NFL 08 sold 4.5 million copies in the quarter ending September 30, 2007, making it EA's best-performing title for that quarter.

== Release ==
EA announced Young as the game's North American cover athlete on April 18, 2007; the company said he was the youngest player to appear on a Madden cover at that time. At launch, EA described the game as available on ten platforms in North America. Earlier in 2007, Apple had announced that Madden NFL 08 and Tiger Woods PGA Tour 08 would ship simultaneously with their PC counterparts as part of EA's return to Mac gaming. After the other versions launched in August, EA told AppleInsider that the Mac OS X version had been pushed to September or October.

The Spanish-language edition was announced in October 2007 and released for PlayStation 2 and Xbox 360 on December 11, 2007. It featured Spanish-language commentary by Álvaro Martín and cover art with Luis Castillo. EA reported on November 1, 2007, that Madden NFL 08 had sold 4.5 million copies and was the company's best-performing title for the quarter ending September 30, 2007.

== Gameplay ==
Madden NFL 08 is an NFL football simulation in which players control teams through exhibition games, season play, franchise modes and online multiplayer. Its central new feature is the Read and React system, known in-game as "weapons". Star players can receive icons identifying specialties such as Smart Quarterback, Possession Receiver, Spectacular Catch Receiver and Shutdown Corner; the system can also be disabled in the settings. The icons are intended to highlight matchup advantages before the snap and make star players more distinct on the field.

Hit Stick 2.0 allows players to deliver high or low tackles by moving the analog stick up or down. The game also added a branching animation system for outcomes such as mid-air collisions, one-handed catches, sideline catches, hurdles and gang tackles. A revised fatigue system makes repeated scrambling by quarterbacks less effective and can also affect teams playing in extreme weather conditions.

=== Modes and platform differences ===
In Superstar Mode, players can create a player, use select rookies from the 2007 NFL draft or import a player from NCAA Football 08's Campus Legend mode. Unlike previous versions in which core attributes were generated through fictional parents, key attributes are assigned during character creation. The game also includes a trophy room for completing in-game tasks and allows trophies to be wagered in online head-to-head games; high-level players can earn customizable EA Challenge rings.

Several modes and options returned after being absent from earlier high-definition console entries, including Owner Mode, fantasy draft, roster editing and cooperative play. The PlayStation 2, Xbox and GameCube versions include Fantasy Challenge, in which players build a roster and compete through a series of increasingly difficult leagues. The Wii version includes online play, a first for Madden on a Nintendo console, along with Mii integration and exclusive game modes.

=== Presentation and music ===
On the Xbox 360 and PlayStation 3 versions, former NFL running back and Madden NFL 2003 cover athlete Marshall Faulk appears in a pregame segment called Marshall's Minute, which previews key players and predicts the score. EA announced a 27-song EA Trax soundtrack in June 2007, including songs by artists such as Mims, Queens of the Stone Age, Daddy Yankee, Atreyu and Datarock.

== Reception ==
Reception

Aggregate scores
Aggregator	Score								
Aggregator	DS	GameCube	PC	PS2	PS3	PSP	Wii	Xbox	Xbox 360
GameRankings	72.75%	77%	76.17%	78.60%	81.46%	74.37%	78.23%	76%	82.72%
Metacritic	71/100	75/100	75/100	78/100	81/100	75/100	76/100	76/100	85/100

Review scores
Publication	Score								
Publication	DS	GameCube	PC	PS2	PS3	PSP	Wii	Xbox	Xbox 360
Electronic Gaming Monthly	N/A	N/A	N/A	N/A	8.83/10	N/A	N/A	N/A	8.83/10
Eurogamer	N/A	N/A	N/A	N/A	N/A	N/A	N/A	N/A	7/10
Game Informer	N/A	N/A	N/A	N/A	8/10	N/A	7.5/10	N/A	8/10
GamePro	N/A	N/A	N/A	N/A	N/A	N/A	2.5/5	N/A	4.75/5
GameRevolution	N/A	N/A	N/A	C+	B−	N/A	B−	N/A	B+
GameSpot	8/10	7.5/10	6.5/10	7.5/10	8.5/10	7/10	8/10	7.5/10	8.5/10
GameSpy	N/A	N/A	N/A	N/A	4/5	N/A	4/5	N/A	4.5/5
GameTrailers	N/A	N/A	N/A	N/A	9/10	N/A	N/A	N/A	9/10
GameZone	N/A	N/A	N/A	N/A	8/10	7.7/10	8.4/10	N/A	8.6/10
IGN	7.4/10	7.6/10	N/A	7.9/10	7.7/10	7.7/10	8.5/10	7.9/10	8.7/10
Nintendo Power	7.5/10	N/A	N/A	N/A	N/A	N/A	8/10	N/A	N/A
Official Xbox Magazine (US)	N/A	N/A	N/A	N/A	N/A	N/A	N/A	7/10	8.5/10
PC Gamer (US)	N/A	N/A	75%	N/A	N/A	N/A	N/A	N/A	N/A
PlayStation: The Official Magazine	N/A	N/A	N/A	8/10	8/10	N/A	N/A	N/A	N/A
The A.V. Club	N/A	N/A	N/A	N/A	A−	N/A	N/A	N/A	A−
The New York Times	N/A	N/A	N/A	N/A	N/A	N/A	(positive)	N/A	N/A

According to Metacritic, the Xbox 360 version received the strongest aggregate score, 85/100, followed by the PlayStation 3 version at 81/100; the remaining listed platforms ranged from 71/100 for the DS version to 78/100 for the PlayStation 2 version. Reviewing the Xbox 360 and PlayStation 3 versions, GameSpot praised the weapons system, control scheme, Franchise-mode depth and animations, while criticizing excessive fumbles, weak audio design, limited online additions and the lower PlayStation 3 frame rate.

GameSpot was less positive about the PC release, describing it as a solid but overly familiar football game and criticizing the absence of some content found in other versions, including Fantasy Challenge. Games for Windows gave the PC version five out of ten. IGN gave the mobile phone version 8/10, praising its new passing controls and roster/stat options.

== Legacy ==
The GameCube version was identified by Game Informer as the console's final North American retail release.

The Windows version was the series' final PC release until Madden NFL 19 in 2018. During the hiatus, the PC version developed a modding community that continued to produce updated and historical rosters.

== See also ==
- NCAA Football 08
- All-Pro Football 2K8
- Blitz: The League II
