= NCAA Football '98 =

1997 video game

- Developer: EA Tiburon
- Publisher: Electronic Arts
- Series: NCAA Football
- Platforms: PlayStation, Microsoft Windows
- Release: PlayStation: NA: August 5, 1997; Windows: NA: October 21, 1997
- Genres: Sports, American football
- Modes: Single-player, multiplayer

NCAA Football '98 is a video game of the sports genre released in 1997 by Electronic Arts. The game featured Florida Gators quarterback and 1996 Heisman Trophy winner Danny Wuerffel on the cover.

== Gameplay ==
This was the first game in the series to feature a multi-season Dynasty Mode, allowing players to take control of a team for four seasons and recruit players to fill out roster vacancies at the completion of each season. EA Sports obtained a formal licensing agreement for the first time with NCAA in the year of 1998. Additionally, it was EA's first college football game to carry the name and logo of the NCAA. Its ability to use the NCAA's brands in the game were the result of a licensing deal intended primarily for EA's NCAA March Madness basketball games (first released in February 1998) and its incorporation of the Men's Division I Basketball Championship.

== Development ==
The game uses an enhanced version of the Madden NFL 97 engine. Play-by-play commentary was done by Chuck White and NCAA referee Bill McCall.

== Reception ==
Reception

Review scores
Publication	Score	
Publication	PC	PS
AllGame	N/A	4/5
CNET Gamecenter	7/10	3/5
Computer Games Strategy Plus	4/5	N/A
Electronic Gaming Monthly	N/A	7.25/10
Game Informer	N/A	8.5/10
GameSpot	6.5/10	7.2/10
IGN	N/A	7/10
Official U.S. PlayStation Magazine	N/A	2/5
PC Gamer (US)	86%	N/A

The game received above-average reviews on both platforms. Though critics said the PlayStation version was somewhat outdated due to its use of the Madden NFL 97 engine, noting in particular the grainy, sprite-based graphics and easily overcome opponent A.I., most found that it offered overall fun and authentic college football. They especially praised the new Dynasty Mode and the playbooks custom-designed for each team. GamePro called it "the best 32-bit college football game to date, easily defeating last season's NCAA GameBreaker." (Note: GamePro gave the PlayStation version two 4/5 scores for graphics and sound, 5/5 for control, and 4.5/5 for overall fun factor.) GameSpot concluded that "With its awesome features, authenticity, and fun gameplay, NCAA 98 is the perfect game for college football fanatics, despite its mediocre graphics and computer AI", though they added that Madden NFL 98 is a better choice for a general football audience. Electronic Gaming Monthly's Dean Hager wrote that "College football is an acquired taste for most, but for those of you who love Madden football, NCAA is a must."
