= NCAA Football 06 =

2005 video game

- Cover art (PlayStation 2)
- Developer: EA Tiburon
- Publisher: EA Sports
- Platforms: PlayStation 2, Xbox
- Release: NA: July 12, 2005
- Genre: Sports
- Modes: Single player, multiplayer

NCAA Football 06 is a collegiate American football video game which was released on July 12, 2005. It is the successor to NCAA Football 2005 in the NCAA Football series. The product features former Michigan Wolverines standout and Heisman Trophy winner Desmond Howard on the cover. He is the only cover athlete not to have played the year before their respective game; Howard last played at Michigan in 1991. It is the only game in the series to feature Division I FCS teams on all platforms as of 2026. NCAA Football 06 was the first game in the NCAA Football series to shorten the year to the last 2 digits.

== Gameplay ==
NCAA Football 06 features a new game mode, "Race for the Heisman". In "Race for the Heisman", you begin as a high school standout hoping to sign with a major college program. After choosing your position and your position-specific drill, you are offered three scholarships, or you can walk on to a school of your choice. The prestige of the offering schools depends on how you performed in your drill.

Another new feature in NCAA Football 06 is the Impact Player. Each team has three impact players, usually the three highest-rated players on the roster, but there is always at least one impact player on offense and on defense. (In Dynasty mode some teams only have two Impact Players in later years, but a third is named later in the season. Impact players will also change based on performance or lack thereof.) Some teams' kickers or punters are impact players, too. Offensive linemen are never impact players in the game. Impact players are called upon to make big plays when "in the zone" (indicated by their white impact icon underneath them pulsating). If they execute a big play, action pauses and the camera zooms in on the tackle, juke move, etc.

Retained from the previous version are the Top 25 toughest places to play (the University of Florida's Ben Hill Griffin Stadium, or "The Swamp", remains #1 in 06), a still-revamped Dynasty Mode (with a new In-Season Recruiting feature), all-time and historic teams, Create-a-School, and much more.

NCAA Football 06 also features online multiplayer. The online servers were shut down on September 1, 2007

== Featured players ==
The main menu screen features a highlight reel with footage of plays made by some of the most famous players in college football history, including Ricky Williams, Bo Jackson, Archie Griffin, Charles Woodson, Herschel Walker, LaDainian Tomlinson, Barry Sanders, LaVar Arrington, Warren Sapp, Ray Lewis, Tim Dwight, Randy Moss, Ron Dayne, Warrick Dunn, Lawrence Taylor, Tim Brown, and Peyton Manning.

== Development ==
Like Madden NFL 06, which has an exclusive license with the NFL, EA has an exclusive license with the NCAA to use stadiums, logos, and team nicknames. According to NCAA Football (a not-for-profit corporation serving to represent various stakeholders for college football), the "EA Sports video football game generates more than $8 million in royalties for NCAA Football and its members." Also, player names are not available in the game because the NCAA would have to pay the players for naming rights so they are called by their positions and numbers, but the player can still give them names. Athletes later sued for a $60 million settlement.

Additionally, the exclusive license with the NCAA later caused controversy when the NCAA was sued for using the likenesses of college athletes in video games without compensation. This led to a series of lawsuits, including O'Bannon v. NCAA, which challenged the NCAA's use of college athlete likenesses in video games.

== Music ==
Prior to the release of NCAA Football 06, the only music featured in the game were fight songs of several major colleges. These would play at random, however, the user-selected "favorite team" would always have their fight song played first whenever the game was first started. NCAA Football 06 was the first and last to include licensed music to keep the series in uniform with other EA Sports releases such as Madden NFL and the NHL series. This format was dropped for NCAA Football 07, with the soundtrack returning to college fight songs. However, it was possible to turn off the licensed music and listen to the fight songs in NCAA Football 06. The music features mainly college rock, punk and post-punk selections, including Bad Religion, The Clash, NOFX and The Mr. T Experience. It is the first NCAA game to feature the option of non-fight songs in the menus.

NCAA Football 06 Soundtrack
Artist	Song
Bad Religion	"Atomic Garden"
The Clash	"Train in Vain (Stand by Me)"
De La Soul	"Me Myself and I"
Guided by Voices	"Teenage FBI"
Jawbreaker	"Bad Scene, Everyone's Fault"
Lagwagon	"Know It All"
Lush	"Ladykillers"
Mother Love Bone	"This Is Shangri-La"
The Mr. T Experience	"More Than Toast"
Ned's Atomic Dustbin	"Kill Your Television"
NOFX	"Jeff Wears Birkenstocks?"
Pixies	"Debaser"
Superchunk	"Hyper Enough"
The Pietasters	"Out All Night"
Therapy?	"Nowhere"

== Release ==
Upon its release, NCAA Football 06 was the best-selling video game for July 2005, occupying both the number 1 and number 2 spots corresponding to the PlayStation 2 and Xbox versions respectively. The title also reached the number 6 spot for the list of best-selling video games of 2005.

== Reception ==
Reception

Aggregate scores
Aggregator	Score
GameRankings	(Xbox) 87.68% (PS2) 87.42%
Metacritic	(Xbox) 87/100 (PS2) 87/100

Review scores
Publication	Score
Electronic Gaming Monthly	9.17/10
Game Informer	8.5/10
GamePro	4.5/5
GameRevolution	B+
GameSpot	8.8/10
GameSpy	5/5
GameTrailers	9.3/10
GameZone	(Xbox) 9.5/10 (PS2) 9.3/10
IGN	9.2/10
Official U.S. PlayStation Magazine	4/5
Official Xbox Magazine (US)	9.1/10
Detroit Free Press	3/4
Maxim	8/10

The game was met with generally positive reception at the time of its release. By July 2006, the PlayStation 2 version of NCAA Football 06 had sold 1.2 million copies and earned $56 million in the United States. Next Generation ranked it as the 40th highest-selling game launched for the PlayStation 2, Xbox or GameCube between January 2000 and July 2006 in that country. Combined sales of NCAA Football console games reached 7 million units in the United States by July 2006.

GameRankings and Metacritic gave it a score of 87.68% and 87 out of 100 for the Xbox version, and 87.42% and 87 out of 100 for the PlayStation 2 version.
