= EA Sports College Football 27 =

2026 video game

- Standard edition cover featuring Kewan Lacy, Malachi Toney, and Dante Moore
- Developer: EA Orlando
- Publisher: EA Sports
- Series: EA Sports College Football
- Engine: Frostbite
- Platforms: PlayStation 5 Xbox Series X/S; Windows
- Release: July 9, 2026
- Genre: Sports
- Modes: Single-player, multiplayer

EA Sports College Football 27 is a video game based on college football, developed by EA Orlando and published by EA Sports. It is the third game in the EA Sports College Football franchise since its return in 2024, and 24th overall including its preceding NCAA Football series.

EA Sports College Football 27 was released on July 9, 2026, for PlayStation 5, Xbox Series X/S, and Windows, though early access was provided on July 2 and 6. It is the first title in the series to be available on PC, being released via the EA app, Epic Games Store, and Steam. The game features 138 playable teams, including new additions North Dakota State and Sacramento State, which joined the Football Bowl Subdivision (FBS) in 2026.

Oregon quarterback Dante Moore, Ole Miss running back Kewan Lacy, and Miami wide receiver Malachi Toney are on the cover for the standard game; their respective schools reached the 2025–26 College Football Playoff semifinals. Indiana head coach Curt Cignetti, who led his team to the national championship, appears on the Deluxe Edition cover alongside the base cover's players, USC quarterback Jayden Maiava, Notre Dame cornerback Leonard Moore, and Texas defensive end Colin Simmons.

== Gameplay ==
College Football 27 retains the series' Road to Glory career mode and Dynasty mode, though updates were made to their mechanics. It also adds dynamic weather that changes as the game progresses, a minigame for quarterback sneaks, mass substitutions without needing to enter the pause menu, and the ability to create custom play adjustments.

Road to Glory adds new playable positions (tight end, edge rusher, and free safety) and more player customization, though Legend Templates based on past college football greats are also available. The player character also has new attributes like potential and mental ability that respectively impact their physical prowess and academics.

In Dynasty, a new feature requires the player coach to perform according to the expectations of their school's athletic director such as beating rivals. Each school also has different priorities to satisfy, such as a certain statistical performance or milestone to achieve. Players are given a roadmap called the Dynasty Blueprint to assist them. A Coach Mode is also included that disables on-field control, meaning the player can only call plays and make adjustments.

Other additions include Mascot Mashup, a mode from the original NCAA Football series in which college mascots play each other, and an expanded Team Builder. Unlike the original mode where they are all available from the start, Mascot Mashup characters must be unlocked, by winning a Play Now or Play a Friend match with a particular team without simulating. Team Builder now includes a creation system for stadiums, fans and chants, and the created school's history like stats; schools made in Team Builder can be exported as high schools in Road to Glory or as colleges in Dynasty.

== Soundtrack ==
The College Football 27 soundtrack includes marching band covers of college fight songs and popular songs recorded by the EA Sports College Football Marching Band, drum cadences, recorded by the EA Sports College Football Drumline, as well as other licensed music. The Carolina Band from the University of South Carolina recorded new arrangements of the "Campus Clash" main theme by Kris Bowers and "Sad But True" by Metallica for the game's soundtrack.

Team Builder's audio suite also features tracks from fellow EA Sports games Madden NFL, NCAA Football 11, and NHL 25, as well as Electronic Arts titles Battlefield 4, Command & Conquer: Red Alert, and Mass Effect 2 and 3.

== Reception ==
Reception

Aggregate scores
Aggregator	Score
Metacritic	(PS5) 77/100 (XSXS) 75/100 (PC) 73/100
OpenCritic	73% recommend

Review scores
Publication	Score
Game Informer	7.5/10
IGN	7/10
Shacknews	7/10

EA Sports College Football 27 received "mixed or average" reviews for the PC version, and "generally favorable" reviews for the PlayStation 5, and Xbox Series X versions from critics according to review aggregator website Metacritic. Fellow review aggregator OpenCritic assessed that the game received strong approval, being recommended by 73% of critics. IGN gave the game a 7/10 as with College Football 26, criticizing the lack of development in the single-player Dynasty and Road to Glory modes. Game Informer gave the game a 7.5/10 praising the presentation, but criticizing the microtransactions.

=== Dynasty and Road to Glory microtransaction controversy ===
A new feature discovered prior to the official launch of College Football 27 by players who purchased the Ultimate Edition has the ability to purchase skill points and levels for coaches in Dynasty mode and players in Road to Glory mode using College Football Points, a virtual currency obtainable through real-world purchases via microtransactions. For example, players could upgrade their coach or player from level 1 to level 100 by spending 12,000 Points, equivalent to approximately US$100. The addition, along with the removal of faster experience gain modifiers in the single-player modes, was criticized by fans, leading College Football YouTuber Bordeaux to create the hashtag #CFBPlayDontPay on social media in protest. Content creators participating in EA's creator program stated that the microtransactions were not present in preview builds of the game, while developers at EA Orlando said that they were "livid" with the changes, which were implemented by EA executives as part of a broader company-wide effort to increase monetization in its titles. In his review for IGN, Will Borger wrote that "the nicest thing I can say is that this is a scumbag move that degrades what is otherwise a pretty good game, but hey, the Evil God of Numbers says the line's gotta go up". Following its launch, the game received a "Mostly Negative" user rating on Steam, with many reviews criticizing the game's monetization features.

EA responded to the criticism at launch by announcing plans to add new experience modifiers to Dynasty mode in a future update, before announcing on July 10 that the paid progression options in Dynasty and Road to Glory would be removed the following morning.

== See also ==
- Madden NFL 27
