= NCAA Football 2000 =

1999 video game

- Developer: EA Tiburon
- Publisher: EA Sports
- Series: NCAA Football
- Platform: PlayStation
- Release: NA: July 29, 1999
- Genres: Sports, American football
- Modes: Single-player, multiplayer

NCAA Football 2000 is a sports video game released in 1999 by EA Sports. Its cover athlete is former Texas Longhorns running back Ricky Williams.

== Reception ==
Reception

Aggregate score
Aggregator	Score
GameRankings	84%

Review scores
Publication	Score
AllGame	4.5/5
CNET Gamecenter	8/10
Electronic Gaming Monthly	7.75/10 (Note: Four critics of Electronic Gaming Monthly gave the game each a score of 8.5/10, 8/10, 7/10, and 7.5/10.)
Game Informer	8/10
GameRevolution	B+
GameSpot	7.8/10
IGN	8.2/10
Official U.S. PlayStation Magazine	4/5

The game received favorable reviews according to the review aggregation website GameRankings.
