= Jared Zabransky =

American gridiron football player (born 1983)

No. 5
- Position: Quarterback

Personal information
- Born: December 4, 1983 (age 42); Hermiston, Oregon, U.S.
- Listed height: 6 ft 2 in (1.88 m)
- Listed weight: 219 lb (99 kg)

Career information
- High school: Hermiston (OR)
- College: Boise State

Career history
- 2007: Houston Texans*
- 2008: Pittsburgh Steelers*
- 2009–2010: Edmonton Eskimos
- * Offseason or practice squad member only
- Stats at CFL.ca (archive)

Jared Zabransky (born December 4, 1983) is an American former professional football quarterback in the National Football League (NFL) and the Canadian Football League (CFL). He was signed by the Houston Texans of the NFL as an undrafted free agent in 2007 though he was never on an active roster in the NFL. He did play two seasons for the Edmonton Eskimos of the CFL in 2009 and 2010. He played college football at Boise State and was named Offensive Player of the Game in the 2007 Fiesta Bowl.

== Early life ==
Zabransky grew up in a farming family in Hermiston, Oregon. He attended Hermiston High School and was an accomplished three-sport athlete, competing in football, baseball, and basketball. Zabransky won Eastern Oregon's Male Athlete of the Year award his senior year in 2002. In addition to being on the honor roll, Zabransky showed his prowess on the gridiron by passing for 1,600 yards and 15 touchdowns as team captain.

== College career ==
Zabransky was redshirted in 2002, his first season at Boise State. He backed-up Ryan Dinwiddie in 2003, in which Zabransky completed 11-of-23 passes for 180 yards and one touchdown.

Zabransky took the reins as the Broncos' starting quarterback in 2004. It was this season that he led Boise State to an 11–1 record; the only loss was to Louisville. He was named honorable mention All-America by Sports Illustrated, second-team All-WAC, and was voted the team's Most Valuable Player.

In 2005, he remained in charge of the Broncos' high-powered offense. While he did start all 13 games, he had what many consider an off-year. He passed for 2,562 yards and threw 18 touchdowns. But he also threw 16 interceptions and was occasionally benched in favor of backup quarterback Taylor Tharp. The season opener against the Georgia Bulldogs in Atlanta, Georgia was a disaster for Zabransky, in which he threw four interceptions in the first half and fumbled. Despite having a sub-par season for a player of his ability, he was able to help take Boise State to the MPC Computers Bowl on their home turf of Bronco Stadium in Boise to face Boston College. After falling behind 24–0 at the half, Boise State rallied, reducing Boston College's lead to 27–21 late in the 4th quarter. Hopes of a comeback were crushed, however, when Zabransky threw an interception in the Boston College endzone with 37 seconds remaining in the game. The Boise State Broncos finished the 2005 season with a 9–4 record.

Zabransky was named 11th best quarterback in the nation by The Sporting News, as well as being named to the 2006 Maxwell Award watch list. Zabransky resumed his job as starting quarterback for the 2006 season, his senior year. The season proved to be a resounding success for both Zabransky and Boise State. Zabransky led his team to a perfect 12–0 regular season record, capturing BSU's fifth consecutive WAC championship. Statistically, it was Zabransky's best season as well. He finished the regular season with 23 touchdown passes and only 7 interceptions.

=== 2007 Fiesta Bowl ===
The Broncos defeated the Oklahoma Sooners in overtime in the Tostitos Fiesta Bowl on January 1, 2007, by a score of 43–42. Zabransky helped his team into overtime by executing a last-minute hook and lateral for the game-tying touchdown. In overtime, Zabransky executed a Statue of Liberty on the game-winning two-point conversion on a handoff to Ian Johnson, who took it in for two points and the win. Zabransky was named 2007 Tostitos Fiesta Bowl Offensive Player of the Game.

== Professional career ==
Pre-draft measurables
Height	Weight	Arm length	Hand span	40-yard dash	10-yard split	20-yard split	20-yard shuttle	Three-cone drill	Vertical jump	Broad jump
6 ft 2 1/8 in (1.88 m)	219 lb (99 kg)	32 3/8 in (0.82 m)	9 in (0.23 m)	4.57 s	1.62 s	2.65 s	4.08 s	6.78 s	35.5 in (0.90 m)	9 ft 3 in (2.82 m)
All values from NFL Combine

=== Houston Texans ===
Zabransky was not selected in the 2007 NFL draft. However, on April 30, 2007, he signed a free agent contract with the Houston Texans. He was issued uniform number 15. He was released on August 31, 2007; however, on September 3, 2007, Zabransky was selected to be a member of the practice squad. However, unlike most coaches who prefer to have three quarterbacks on the active roster, head coach Gary Kubiak preferred having two quarterbacks (Matt Schaub and Sage Rosenfels) and cut Zabransky on September 18, 2007.

=== Pittsburgh Steelers ===
On February 5, 2008, Zabransky signed a two-year contract with the Pittsburgh Steelers and was waived on July 3.

=== Edmonton Eskimos ===
Zabransky signed with the Edmonton Eskimos of the Canadian Football League (CFL) on April 27, 2009. He won the third quarterback spot (behind Ricky Ray and Jason Maas) on the Eskimos roster for the '09 season, beating out NFL QB Lester Ricard.

In 2009 Zabransky dressed for 18 games as the team's third-string quarterback. He was in for the first play of the game on Sept 20 in Saskatchewan and pitched the ball to Calvin McCarty for a five-yard gain. Zabransky dressed as the team's third quarterback for the Western Semi-Final.

In 2010 Zabransky dressed for nine games as a backup quarterback. He was 20-of-43 in pass attempts (46.5%) for 266 yards, two touchdowns and five interceptions. He ran the ball eight times for 75 yards, including an 18-yard touchdown in Game 6 vs. Toronto – his first in the CFL. He saw his first significant playing time in Game 8 vs. Saskatchewan. On October 23, 2010, in his first full-game start for the Eskimos, Zabransky completed 16 of 23 passes for 188 yards, two touchdowns and no interceptions to lead Edmonton to a 39–24 victory over the Saskatchewan Roughriders. The win was the fifth in six games for Edmonton, keeping them tied with the B.C. Lions for third place and a possible playoff berth in the CFL's West Division.

On May 4, 2011, Zabransky became a free agent when he was released by the Eskimos. In two seasons with the Esks, Zabransky started two games, both in 2010. He finished the year with 53 completions on 104 attempts for 609 yards, four touchdowns and 10 interceptions. Zabransky posted 28 carries for 209 yards and one touchdown.

== In the media ==
Zabransky told ESPN's Kirk Herbstreit in an interview that he could throw a potato 100 yards. The comment has been referenced in the video games NCAA Football 07 and NCAA Football 08 where Herbstreit will sometimes say "That reminds me of the time that kid at the Liberty Bowl told me he could throw a potato 80 yards." Herbstreit was a color commentator at the 2004 Liberty Bowl, Zabransky's first bowl game as a starter.

On February 28, 2007, it was announced that Zabransky would grace the cover of EA's video game NCAA Football 08. He is the second of the game's cover athletes to date to go undrafted, after its first feature athlete, Tommie Frazier on College Football USA 97.

== Personal life ==
Zabransky majored in Communication at Boise State and graduated on the dean's list. He is currently an International Businessman and entrepreneur.
