= NCAA Football 08 =

2007 video game

- Cover art featuring Jared Zabransky
- Developer: EA Tiburon
- Publisher: EA Sports
- Designer: EA Tiburon
- Platforms: Xbox 360, PlayStation 3, PlayStation 2, Xbox
- Release: NA: July 17, 2007
- Genre: Sports
- Modes: Single-player, multiplayer

NCAA Football 08 is a college football video game created by EA Sports, the sports video gaming subsidiary of Electronic Arts. It is the successor to NCAA Football 07 in the NCAA Football series. It was officially announced with the launch of the NCAA 08 page on the EA Sports website on February 20, 2007. EA Sports had opened up a ballot on their NCAA Football 07 site in which fans could vote on a feature to be implemented into the PlayStation 2 version, making it the first console announced for the game and announcing at least one of its features. Fans could vote for either in-game saves, medical red shirts, summer workouts or a lead blocker feature. The option of medical red shirts was voted on and won, and this option is on the Dynasty Mode on all versions of NCAA Football 08. This allows for players that are injured in the middle of the year to apply to gain another year of eligibility. The game was released on July 17, 2007, with a first time release on PlayStation 3, marking the eleventh installment of the NCAA Football series bearing the title NCAA Football. As with NCAA Football 07, NCAA Football 08 features limited ESPN integration.

== Next-gen improvements ==
Animations: NCAA Football 08 runs at 60 frames per second on the Xbox 360 (up from 30 in last year's edition). PS3 remains at 30 frames per second but still includes many of the animations present on the 360 albeit at a slower speed. There are 115 detailed stadiums, up from 40 in NCAA Football 07. The game also features a new gameplay engine and branching animation system. This allows for gang tackling, mid-air collisions, sideline catches, and several other brand new animations.

Control Scheme: In keeping with the brand new animations, NCAA Football 08 features a fairly new control scheme from NCAA Football 07. The hit stick has been improved allowing for players to take out the ball carrier's legs by pressing down on the right analog stick. Lead blocking controls from Madden have crossed over onto NCAA Football 08. Offensive hot routes, audibles, and defensive playmaker options are also new additions to NCAA Football 08. The difference between All-American and Heisman is comparable to the difference between night and day because one could go undefeated with a team in All-American mode but move up to Heisman and lose every single game.

Motivation: Next gen versions include a new motivation system. If a player does well, it will boost his motivation making his attributes better. Eventually, if this player is motivated enough he will also motivate other people which will raise their attributes as well.

Recruiting Features: The dynasty mode includes a more in depth recruiting feature allowing the user to make promises and recruiting visits. As in previous games, NCAA Football 08 allows the user to export their rosters to Madden 08.

Player Creation: When users create a Campus Legend on Xbox 360 or PS3, a player and high school are created, and the game begins at the state championship playoffs. Performance during the playoffs will determine your caliber. The higher your caliber, the higher your stats will get, and more schools will offer you a scholarship. As in the previous two games, the player will also have the option to walk-on at another school. There are scouts from different schools at every game, so the better you play the bigger the schools that are interested. You even get the option when creating your player to choose your top choice so your coach knows who your primary school focus is on. You will no longer control the whole team, but only your player; This has not been changed for PlayStation 2 or Xbox. Campus Legend on PlayStation 2 and Xbox is relatively unchanged; the user still encounters the five drills as before.

Mini Games: There is a new mini game of sorts available for play called Points Pursuit on the current gen versions. It is similar to a regular game except that the scoring is based on yards gained, tackles, interceptions, touchdowns, and other things as well as arcade style gameplay and several random opportunities for double, triple, and quadruple points.

Skills: During regular gameplay, the user can look at his or her My Skills. My Skills keeps track of all the user controlled plays a player has made. For example, if you made a "user pick" with CB #1, then in the My Skills menu it will read CB #1 1 INT. My Skills is only available in the current gen versions.

Highlights: A new feature for the series are My Highlights, which users can use to save game replays and snap shots from previously played games and subsequently upload to EA Sports World GDC 2008 Coverage: Wrapping it Up. My Highlights are exclusive to next gen versions of the game.

Award Tracking: My Shrine is another new addition which allows users to keep track of their trophies and accomplishments.

Trick Plays: Inspired by the 2007 Fiesta Bowl, NCAA Football also introduces more trick plays than before. The hook and ladder (the name of the play on the cover, but dubbed the "circus" by Boise State) and statue of liberty play are both playable on this game in addition to a multitude of other trick plays including a flea flicker and halfback pass.

== Cover athlete ==
On March 2, 2007, it was announced by EA Sports that Jared Zabransky was chosen as the cover athlete for the upcoming NCAA Football 08. The main reason cited for this decision was Zabransky's outstanding year with the Boise State Broncos and their win in the BCS Fiesta Bowl over Oklahoma as the second at-large team from a non-Bowl Championship Series conference. He is the second cover athlete in the NCAA Football series that went undrafted the next year, along with Nebraska QB Tommie Frazier.

== Demo ==
A week before the game's release, EA Sports released an Xbox 360 and a PlayStation 3 demo for NCAA Football 08 on the Xbox Live Marketplace. It features a playable contest of the top two teams in the game - the USC Trojans and the Michigan Wolverines - in the Los Angeles Coliseum with two minute quarters.

== Reception ==
NCAA Football 08 received generally positive reviews from critics for the PlayStation 3 and Xbox 360 versions, earning scores of 77/100 and 81/100 on Metacritic, respectively.
