= College Football USA 96 =

1995 video game

- Developer: High Score Entertainment
- Publisher: EA Sports
- Series: NCAA Football
- Platform: Sega Genesis
- Release: 1995
- Genre: Sports
- Modes: Single-player, multiplayer

College Football USA 96 is a sports video game released in 1995 by EA Sports. It is the follow-up to Bill Walsh College Football '95 and part of EA's NCAA Football series of games. College Football USA 96 is the first game in the series that included all of the Division l-A teams (there were 108 teams at the time) and was also the first to include actual bowl games (the Orange Bowl, Sugar Bowl, Fiesta Bowl, and Rose Bowl). With Bill Walsh's retirement from coaching after the 1994 season, the game no longer carried an endorsement.

The game received praise for the large number of available teams and for being an accurate simulation of the sport.

== Gameplay ==
Players had the option to play through a full 11-game season (or less as desired) as any of the 108 selectable Division I-A teams before the team advances to one of the college bowl games. College Football USA 96 would mark the first and the only time that the Southwest Conference would appear in a college football video game because it would merge with the Big 8 to form the Big 12 the following year. It also marked the only time that the University of Pacific Tigers football team would appear in a video game, as they dropped their football program after the 1995 season to save money.

Players could select from 400 plays, and could choose one of five receivers on each play using the new passing mode. The game added other features and options such as: four-player mode, three possible lengths for a game, substitutions, injuries, fake snaps, spins, audibles, interceptions, hurdles, dives, blocked kicks, and laterals.

== Reception ==
Reception

Review scores
Publication	Score
AllGame	3.5/5
Electronic Gaming Monthly	16.5/20
Game Informer	8/10
Game Players	82%
GameFan	92%/80%
GamePro	4.625/5
Next Generation	3/5
Fusion	3/5
VideoGames	8/10

The game was well received by critics. GamePro called it "the most authentic and in-depth Genesis college football cart yet", citing the challenging AI, the huge selection of teams, and the many new features and gameplay elements brought to the series. The two sports reviewers of Electronic Gaming Monthly gave it scores of 8.5 and 8 out of 10. They likewise praised the selection of teams and the new gameplay elements, and remarked that the game "brings another level in football gaming."

Next Generation rated it three stars out of five, and stated that "College football fans will love the complete teams and playbooks, but we're still waiting to see the new version of College Football National Championship from Sega before we pick a national champion."

Namio Noma for The Folsom Telegraph praised the game, saying that "overall, College Football USA '96 is yet another strong game from the sports experts at EA Sports.
