= NCAA Football 12 =

2011 video game

- Mark Ingram II on the cover of NCAA Football 12.
- Developer: EA Tiburon
- Publisher: EA Sports
- Platforms: PlayStation 3, Xbox 360
- Release: NA: July 12, 2011
- Genre: Traditional football simulation
- Modes: Single-player, multiplayer

NCAA Football 12 is a college football video game created by EA Sports and developed by EA Tiburon. It is the successor to NCAA Football 11 in the NCAA Football series. It was released on July 12, 2011 for the PlayStation 3 and Xbox 360.

== Gameplay ==
A new momentum-based tackling system has been introduced, including double-hit tackles and an overall increase in the number of tackle animations. A coach mode has also been added, where players can call plays, and make pre-play adjustments as well as watch them unfold, through a broadcast-style camera. Field grass is now rendered in 3-D for instant replays. In addition, various aspects of the game have added sponsorship picked up from SPARQ, Allstate, Coca-Cola Zero, Nissan, and Lowe's. Progressive Corporation iPad 2 For Dynasty Mode, changes include a new coaching carousel where players can start as offensive or defensive coordinators and change jobs or get promoted after each season; at the same time, AI coaches will also switch positions or get fired. Crowds will be louder or quieter based on the player's team's success, and how big the stadium is. The ability to create custom conferences has been added; previous versions only allowed one-to-one swaps of teams between conferences; conference membership can also be changed from year to year. BCS Bowl tie-ins can be changed, although there is still no end-of-season playoff option due to licensing with the BCS.

Road to Glory, a game mode in which a player takes control of a prospective collegiate athlete and must practice, study, and play at the level needed to win the Heisman Trophy, has been expanded to include an entire high school senior season (past versions of the game only included high school playoffs) and a points and rewards system to increase ratings. You can use teambuilder teams as your high school opponents. Support has been added for two-way players. Once in college, student-athletes can only advance on their team's depth chart (or call their own plays or audibles if a quarterback) when they have earned enough "trust points" from their coach. However, major drawbacks of Road to Glory includes:

- While an offensive RTG player (QB, TE, WR, etc.) can break away from his assignments and run his own routes, a defensive RTG player is always restricted to his assignments and even controller inputs cannot make him break away from his assignments until contact with opposite O-Line.
- It is now impossible for a defensive RTG player to win the Heisman Trophy under any circumstances.

The demo, released on June 28 on Xbox Live and PlayStation Network, features two matchups representing four conferences. One has the reigning Pac-10 champion Oregon Ducks visiting the Texas Longhorns of the Big 12. The second has the ACC's Atlantic Champion Florida State Seminoles hosting the Alabama Crimson Tide of the Southeastern Conference. Additionally, players can share the demo through Xbox Live or the PlayStation Network to unlock the alternate Pro Combat uniforms of five squads for use in the full game.

== Cover ==
On April 19, 2011, it was announced that former Alabama running back and 2009 Heisman Trophy winner Mark Ingram II would be the cover athlete for the game. Ingram won a fan vote organized by EA Sports to determine who the cover athlete would be in a campaign using the slogan "U Want Me". Ingram beat out Auburn's Nick Fairley, Oklahoma's DeMarco Murray, and Washington's Jake Locker. Votes were taken through the game's Facebook page. Alternate covers (Nick Fairley, DeMarco Murray, Jake Locker) were made available for download on the NCAA Football 12 website.

== Commentary ==
The announcers remain the same from NCAA Football 11 with Kirk Herbstreit and Brad Nessler in the announcer booth along with Erin Andrews on the sideline. For the first time, Lee Corso was not involved in the game as only Herbstreit predicts the winner of the matchup. However, not all Corso commentary was deleted in the PS3 version.

== Reception ==
Reception

Review score
Publication	Score
IGN	8.5

The game was rated 8.5/10 and called "great" by IGN. Another reviewer called the game "practically perfect". Reception from players who purchased the game was not quite so favorable, with some gamers criticizing the lack of innovation from previous installments, as well as linebackers who jump unrealistically high.

== See also ==
- NCAA Footballs
- Madden NFL 12
