= NCAA Football 2003 =

2002 video game

- Developer: EA Tiburon
- Publisher: EA Sports
- Series: NCAA Football
- Platforms: GameCube, PlayStation 2, Xbox
- Release: NA: July 22, 2002
- Genres: Sports, American football
- Modes: Single-player, multiplayer

NCAA Football 2003 is a video game of the sports genre released in 2002 by EA Tiburon. Its cover athlete is former Oregon Ducks quarterback Joey Harrington.

Several additions were made to this edition of the game, such as Mascot Games with over 50 mascot teams, 3D cheerleaders, over 200 authentic fight songs, real college rivalries for coveted trophies, 28 bowl games, and more. Like previous years, the game included such features as dynasty mode, create-a-school (notably absent from NCAA Football 2002), create-a-player, campus challenges, and has Lee Corso, Kirk Herbstreit, and Brad Nessler as commentators.

== Reception ==
Reception

Aggregate score
Aggregator	Score		
Aggregator	GameCube	PS2	Xbox
Metacritic	91/100	91/100	90/100

Review scores
Publication	Score		
Publication	GameCube	PS2	Xbox
AllGame	N/A	4.5/5	N/A
Electronic Gaming Monthly	N/A	9/10	N/A
GamePro	5/5	5/5	5/5
GameRevolution	N/A	B+	A−
GameSpot	8.8/10	8.5/10	8.8/10
GameSpy	N/A	85%	4.5/5
GameZone	9.3/10	9.5/10	8.9/10
IGN	8.9/10	8.9/10	8.9/10
Nintendo Power	4.2/5	N/A	N/A
Nintendo World Report	9/10	N/A	N/A
Official U.S. PlayStation Magazine	N/A	5/5	N/A
Official Xbox Magazine (US)	N/A	N/A	8.8/10
Maxim	5/5	5/5	5/5

The game received "universal acclaim" on all platforms according to the review aggregation website Metacritic.

It was nominated for GameSpot's annual "Best Traditional Sports Game on Xbox" award, which went to NFL 2K3. It was also a nominee for "Console Sports Game of the Year" at the AIAS' 6th Annual Interactive Achievement Awards, which ultimately went to Madden NFL 2003.

The game sold 1.3 million units as of August 2003.
