= College Football USA 97 =

1996 sports video game

- Cover art for the Super NES version
- Developers: Tiburon Entertainment (SNES); High Score Entertainment (Genesis)
- Publisher: EA Sports
- Platforms: Super NES, Sega Genesis
- Release: 1996
- Genres: Sports, American football
- Modes: Single player, multiplayer

College Football USA 97 is a sports video game released in 1996 by EA Sports. Its cover athlete is former Nebraska Cornhuskers quarterback Tommie Frazier.

== Gameplay ==
College Football USA 97 added a feature for creating up to 28 new players and designing custom schedules, and also adds new animations and features players from all 111 Division I-A teams. Players can also compete in a special Tournament which supports up to 16 players participating in a single-elimination format or a round robin format.

Players can also adjust the settings for penalties, can set the weather type, enter their own user records, perform player substitutions, set the audibles, toggle the injuries, and change the game length, as well as the difficulty level. The game also makes available authentic playbooks (including plays such as the Wishbone), and a USA Today/CNN Coaches Poll, as well as the Sears National Championship Trophy.

== Release ==
College Football USA 97 is the fourth game in the NCAA Football series. While the game was published for the Mega Drive by EA Sports as usual, the Super NES version was instead published by THQ.

== Contest ==
In the third quarter of 1996 EA Sports conducted a College Football '97 tour, in which they visited top colleges, holding a competition using the Genesis version of the game. The top four teams were flown to New Orleans in January 1997 to attend both the finals and the Sugar Bowl. The winning team in the finals was awarded a trophy, a video game system of their choice, and a collection of EA Sports games.

== Reception ==
Reception

Review scores
| Publication | Score |
|---|---|
| Electronic Gaming Monthly | 7/10 (GEN) |
| Next Generation | 3/5 (GEN) |

Reviews for this installment were still positive, but reviewers generally commented that the additions and improvements from College Football USA '96 are too subtle, and advised gamers who already owned the previous installment to carefully consider how important the new features are to them before purchasing. However, GamePro called the Super NES port "a complete gridiron debacle. Players fly around the field - except for the man with the ball, whose movements slow down and become jerky. The frame rate and animation are poor (the players look armless), and the sound features the most obnoxious whistle in sports gaming history." They rated it a 1.5 out of 5 in graphics and a 0.5 in every other category (sound, control, and fun factor), making it only the second game to receive a 0.5 or lower from GamePro in any category.
