= NCAA Football 2002 =

2001 video game

- Developer: EA Tiburon
- Publisher: EA Sports
- Series: NCAA Football
- Platform: PlayStation 2
- Release: NA: July 24, 2001
- Genres: Sports, American football
- Modes: Single player, multiplayer

NCAA Football 2002 is a video game of the sports genre released in 2001 by EA Tiburon. The cover athlete is the Florida State Seminoles and 2000 Heisman Trophy winner quarterback Chris Weinke. The game featured all (as of 2001) Division 1-A schools along with all Southwestern Athletic Conference (SWAC), Mid-Eastern Athletic Conference (MEAC), and Ivy League schools. This game notably did not have a create-a-school option, and is the only game to feature the EA Sports fight song as the main menu music.

== Reception ==
Reception

Aggregate score
Aggregator	Score
Metacritic	90/100

Review scores
Publication	Score
Electronic Gaming Monthly	8.83/10
EP Daily	9/10
Game Informer	9/10
GamePro	4.5/5
GameRevolution	B+
GameSpot	8.6/10
GameSpy	88%
IGN	9/10
Next Generation	5/5
Official U.S. PlayStation Magazine	4.5/5
Maxim	5/5
Playboy	90%

The game received "universal acclaim" according to the review aggregation website Metacritic. Jim Preston of NextGen said that the game was "Undoubtedly the best college football game available for any system." Playboy gave it universal acclaim, a few weeks before the game was released.
