= NCAA Football 2004 =

2003 video game

- North American cover art for PS2; Pictured: Carson Palmer
- Developers: EA Tiburon, Exient Entertainment (N-Gage)
- Publisher: EA Sports
- Series: NCAA Football
- Platforms: Xbox, PlayStation 2, GameCube, N-Gage
- Release: GameCube, PlayStation 2, Xbox: NA: July 15, 2003; N-Gage: NA: December 10, 2003
- Genre: Sports
- Modes: Single-player, multiplayer

NCAA Football 2004 is an American football video game released in 2003 by Tiburon. It is the successor to NCAA Football 2003 in the NCAA Football series. The player on the cover is former USC quarterback Carson Palmer. The game is available for play with the N-Gage. Commentators are Brad Nessler, Kirk Herbstreit and Lee Corso. The game is an EA Sports Bio game, and is compatible with other games with the feature (Madden NFL 2004 and NASCAR Thunder 2004, for example).

== Gameplay ==
The game's gameplay is similar to NCAA Football 2003, but with updated player stats and rosters. Players can rename players or create their own college team. If the player named the school after one of the schools in the game, the announcers use its name and fight song in the game. The game features new on-field presentation features such as players walking out of their locker room area and then onto the field behind a group of flag bearers. It also features player touchdown celebrations which can result in a penalty for unsportsmanlike conduct.

== Reception ==
Reception

Aggregate scores
Aggregator	Score
GameRankings	(PS2) 93.27% (Xbox) 91.33% (GC) 90.42% (N-Gage) 62.75%
Metacritic	(PS2) 94/100 (GC) 89/100 (Xbox) 88/100 (N-Gage) 65/100

Review scores
Publication	Score
AllGame	4/5
Electronic Gaming Monthly	9.17/10
Game Informer	(PS2) 8.75/10 (GC) 8.5/10
GamePro	5/5
GameRevolution	(PS2) A− B+
GameSpot	(PS2) 8.8/10; 8.3/10 (N-Gage) 5.5/10
GameSpy	4.5/5 (GC) 86% (N-Gage) 3/5
GameZone	(PS2) 9.6/10 (GC) 9/10 (Xbox) 8.8/10
IGN	(PS2) 9.1/10; 9/10 (N-Gage) 5.6/10
Nintendo Power	4.8/5
Official U.S. PlayStation Magazine	5/5
The Village Voice	8/10

The game's reviews varied across consoles. According to video game review aggregator Metacritic, the PlayStation 2 release received "universal acclaim" and the GameCube and Xbox releases received "generally favorable" reviews, while the N-Gage release's reviews were "average".

GameSpot named NCAA Football 2004 the best PlayStation 2 game of July 2003.

During the 7th Annual Interactive Achievement Awards, the Academy of Interactive Arts & Sciences nominated NCAA Football 2004 for "Console Sports Simulation Game of the Year", which was ultimately awarded to Madden NFL 2004.

The game sold 550,000 copies in its first two weeks.
