= EA Sports GameShow =

- Developer(s): EA Tiburon
- Publisher(s): EA Sports
- Designer(s): Jim Preston
- Platform(s): Windows
- Release: October 23, 2007
- Genre(s): Sports, Trivia
- Mode(s): online

EA Sports GameShow was a live-hosted online trivia game show, made available as a free Windows download. GameShow was first publicly mentioned by Peter Moore in September 2007, not long after he took over as president of EA Sports. GameShow debuted as a public beta on October 23, 2007, with the first public trivia session being Our Favorite Day - October 23rd. GameShow came to an end on July 25, 2008.

Operating out of EA Tiburon's Orlando studios, live trivia sessions were hosted for at least six hours each day by a team of radio professionals. Players were encouraged to interact with the game and the hosts in a variety of ways, including live polls, text messages and phone calls.

== The game ==
Players gathered in rooms according to their geographical location or team rooting interests, where they face off, vied for the high score in their rooms, regions and overall. Trivia sessions were 15 minutes long each, and each normal session had 15 questions, divided into three groups of five. Lightning rounds were sprinkled in, which doubled the questions and halved the time allotted for answering. The faster a player answered each question, the higher their score. Tokens were awarded to players for answering questions correctly, and for getting the high score in their room, region and overall. These tokens could be spent on power-ups to assist them in getting high scores, on avatar parts to customize their on-screen personas, or on raffles to try to win prizes. At the end of each session, the host revealed the leaderboard for that round, and identified the top scorers in the West, Central, and East regions, and the top Overall scorer. Though the majority of the sessions were sports related, there were a number of hours of pop culture trivia each week.

Trivia Session Staples

- Our Favorite Day - a This Day in History category encompassing all manner of sport.
- Full Circle - The round begins with a question about an athlete, and each successive question builds on the previous answer, eventually coming back around to the initial athlete in the final question.
- Spotlight - a team or athlete is the subject of the entire session.
- Pop: Week in Review - a review of the previous week's pop culture highlights and lowlights.

== On-air staff ==
The on-air production staff for EA GameShow was culled from experienced radio professionals from across the country. Hosts included Rob and Jason Thompson, hosts of Fox Sports Radio's Fantasy Football program; Mike Bower, formerly of Maxim Radio, "SweetNasty" Chris Cause, Jana of WXXL Orlando. and Mike Tuck. Others who host include producers Paul Ihander, Eric Gray, Carlos Navarro and Nate Lundy, who is also the game's Program Director. Producers often appear on-air and include the aforementioned Paul Ihander, Eric Gray, and Carlos Navarro.
