= Madden NFL 99 =

1998 American football video game

- Developer: EA Tiburon
- Publisher: EA Sports
- Series: Madden NFL
- Platforms: PlayStation, Nintendo 64, Microsoft Windows
- Release: PlayStation: NA: August 25, 1998; EU: 1998; Nintendo 64: NA: September 22, 1998; EU: January 1999; Windows: NA: September 30, 1998
- Genre: Sports
- Modes: Single-player, Multiplayer

Madden NFL 99 is a football video game released for the PlayStation, Nintendo 64 and Microsoft Windows. It is the first video game to feature Franchise mode. The game's commentary is by John Madden and Pat Summerall. The American version of the game features John Madden himself on the cover, while the European version uses Garrison Hearst instead. The game was the top-selling PlayStation sports video game in 1998 in North America, having sold 1.1 million copies on the PlayStation.

== Gameplay ==
=== Features ===
- The game is the first to feature the concept of covering the ball while running and the chop block and "clothesline" techniques, which were later scrapped and moved to players simply tackling ball-carriers. Although players' heights resemble their real-life counterparts, all players share the same sized physiques. The game includes twelve historic teams, including the 1978 Steelers and 1985 Bears and secret teams such as the Tiburon sports team and NFL All-Star teams from each decade. The Cleveland Browns, who were a year away from rejoining the league, can be accessed for exhibition games via the password "WELCOMEBACK".
- This is the first Madden game to feature Franchise Mode, in which the user can control their team for 15 seasons, complete with realistic NFL type schedules consisting of alternating inter-conference divisional opponents. The user is able to trade, sign/release and draft players. Only one player/team owner is allowed to participate during the same franchised season, and created players cannot be added to specific teams or to the free agent pool.
- Like its predecessors, it supports two PlayStation Multitaps, allowing for up to eight players to play simultaneously.

=== Free agents ===
- Created Players from NCAA Football 99 can be put in the game as free agents and put on other teams in Quick Game Mode.
- Gary Zimmerman appears as a free agent despite being retired at the beginning of the season.
- Pepper Johnson is listed incorrectly as a 24-year-old twelve-year veteran, which would mean he would have been 12-years-old as a rookie.

=== Rankings ===
The Denver Broncos is the best team overall in the game with a score of 92. The worst teams in the game are the New York Jets and the Miami Dolphins with a score of 70. The best offense in the game belongs to the Green Bay Packers with a score of 95. The best defense in the game belongs to the San Francisco 49ers with a score of 97. The best special team in the game is the New England Patriots with a perfect score of 100.

== Development ==
In early 1998 Electronic Arts announced that, following the 1997 Madden Football 64's lack of an NFL team license due to Acclaim Entertainment holding exclusive rights to NFL games on the Nintendo 64 for that year, they had ensured that the Nintendo 64 version of Madden NFL 99 would sport the NFL license. They also sought to catch up with competing football video games by using high resolution graphics and adding animations for wrap-tackles and players tracking the ball with their heads.

== Reception ==
Reception

Aggregate score
Aggregator	Score		
Aggregator	N64	PC	PS
GameRankings	88%	87%	84%

Review scores
Publication	Score		
Publication	N64	PC	PS
AllGame	4.5/5	4.5/5	4/5
CNET Gamecenter	10/10	8/10	10/10
Computer Gaming World	N/A	4.5/5	N/A
Electronic Gaming Monthly	8.75/10 (Note: In Electronic Gaming Monthly's review of the Nintendo 64 version, two critics gave it each a score of 9/10, and the other two gave it each a score of 8.5/10.)	N/A	8.5/10
Game Informer	8.75/10	N/A	9.25/10
GamePro	5/5 (Note: GamePro gave the Nintendo 64 version two 5/5 scores for graphics and overall fun factor, 4/5 for sound, and 4.5/5 for control.)	5/5 (Note: GamePro gave the PC version 4/5 for graphics, 4.5/5 for sound, and two 5/5 scores for control and overall fun factor.)	5/5 (Note: GamePro gave the PlayStation version two 4.5/5 scores for graphics and sound, 4/5 for control, and 5/5 for overall fun factor.)
GameRevolution	A−	B	A−
GameSpot	8.5/10	8.8/10	8.3/10
Hyper	N/A	N/A	82%
IGN	8.5/10	8.5/10	8.5/10
N64 Magazine	88%	N/A	N/A
Next Generation	N/A	N/A	2/5
Nintendo Power	8.3/10	N/A	N/A
Official U.S. PlayStation Magazine	N/A	N/A	4.5/5
PC Accelerator	N/A	7/10	N/A
PC Gamer (US)	N/A	85%	N/A
PC Zone	N/A	87/100	N/A
N64 Gamer	8/10	N/A	N/A

The game received "favorable" reviews on all platforms according to video game review aggregator GameRankings. Next Generation, however, said of the PlayStation version, "It can be argued that this year's Madden was better than last year's, but the fact remains that compared to its main competitor, the gaming experience has become mediocre. The gap that had existed between the GameDay series and the Madden series can now only be described as Grand Canyon size."

Kevin Cheung of Hyper gave the PlayStation version 82% in its December 1998 issue, calling it "the best NFL sim anywhere." An issue later, Matt Adamsons gave the PC version 85%, calling it "the best NFL simulation money could buy." Martin Kitts of N64 Magazine gave the N64 version 88%, saying, "Madden is still great stuff, but it hasn't really changed significantly enough to warrant another 92% rating." Steve Bauman of Computer Games Strategy Plus gave the PC version four stars out of five, saying, "The perfect synergy of hardcore action and cerebral simulation hasn't been reached yet, but Madden 99 is as close as anyone has ever managed to get, and as its management features evolve, it will no longer be, 'I guess we'll have to wait until next year.' Now it's more like 'I can't wait until next year.'"

According to the NPD Group, the game was the tenth best-selling video game of 1998 by unit sales. During the 2nd Annual Interactive Achievement Awards, Madden NFL 99 was named as a finalist by the Academy of Interactive Arts & Sciences for PC Sports Game of the Year, which ultimately went to FIFA 99.
