= Madden NFL 12 =

2011 video game

- Cover art featuring Peyton Hillis
- Developers: EA Tiburon; HB Studios (Wii)
- Publisher: EA Sports
- Series: Madden NFL
- Platforms: PlayStation 2; PlayStation 3; PlayStation Portable; Wii; Xbox 360; iOS; Android; BlackBerry PlayBook
- Release: NA: August 30, 2011; AU: September 1, 2011 (PS3, X360); EU: September 2, 2011 (PS3, X360)
- Genre: Sports
- Modes: Single-player, multiplayer

Madden NFL 12 is an American football video game based on the National Football League published by EA Sports and developed by EA Tiburon. It was released on August 30, 2011 in North America and Asia, September 1, 2011 in Australia, and September 2, 2011 in Europe. It was available on August 27, 2011 to EA Sports Season Ticket subscribers for a three-day trial. It was the last Madden NFL game to be released on the PlayStation Portable and the PlayStation 2.

The demo was released on August 9, featuring a game between the Green Bay Packers and Chicago Bears.

== New features ==
=== General ===
- Over 200 new offensive plays and several new defensive plays have been added.
- Generated rookies now have real faces when viewed in menus.
- The Madden Developers team is available in Play Now mode by pressing random team.
- The opening presentation for games includes mascots and cheerleaders for all teams that have them.

=== Gameplay ===
- The kickoffs are now at the 35-yard line rather than the 30-yard line, to match the NFL's rule changing.
- Onside kicks can be executed from standard kickoff formations.
- Tuner for developers to improve gameplay code without the distribution of official patches.
- To support awareness for concussions, players who suffer a concussion during gameplay will no longer be allowed to return to the game.
- A new collision system uses momentum to produce more authentic tackling and hits with 100 new tackle animations, including 40 gang tackles. The system also allows for more realistic blocking, with defenders only interacting with blocking players once contact is made.
- AI enhancements allow defensive players in zone coverage to correctly recognize and react to plays with the capability to shift assignments when necessary.
- Quarterbacks can now pump fake to specific receivers.
- A new Dive Catch mechanic allows for user control of a variety of new dive catch animations.
- The custom playbooks feature allows players to modify existing playbooks or create their own by selecting plays from 75 playbooks.
- Player traits change dynamically throughout a game based on his performance.

=== Franchise mode ===
- During free agency in franchise mode, players bid auction-style against other general managers for free agents.
- Expanded rosters in the preseason allow teams to have 75 players on the roster and need to make roster cuts each week.
- Unlike previous versions of Madden NFL, players can trade for future draft picks.
- There are also hot and cold streaks that will affect player ratings throughout the season.
- When a player is placed on Injured Reserve, a new player may be signed without having to cut anyone.

== Cover athlete ==
On March 21, 2011, EA began a bracket style 32-player tournament (with one player per team) for fans to vote and decide who would appear on the cover for the 2012 edition of Madden. The two players in the final round of the tournament were running back Peyton Hillis of the Cleveland Browns and quarterback Michael Vick of the Philadelphia Eagles. Peyton Hillis was announced as the winner on ESPN's SportsNation by a score of 66% to 34%.

== Soundtrack ==
The soundtrack featured various hip hop and rock songs from various artists including Alberta Cross, Rise Against, Snoop Dogg, T-Pain, Chris Brown, Nas, Korn, Theophilus London, Five Finger Death Punch, Foo Fighters, Common, A Tribe Called Quest, Akon, and many more.

== Release and reception ==
Reception

Aggregate scores
Aggregator	Score
GameRankings	(X360) 79.90% (PS3) 79.47% (Wii) 75% (iOS) 66%
Metacritic	(PS3) 79/100 (X360) 78/100 (Wii) 75/100 (iOS) 71/100

Review scores
Publication	Score
Destructoid	7/10
Game Informer	7.5/10
GamePro	3.5/5
GameRevolution	B+
GameSpot	7.5/10
GameTrailers	8.5/10
Giant Bomb	3/5
IGN	8/10 (Wii) 7/10
Joystiq	3.5/5
Nintendo Power	7/10
Official Xbox Magazine (US)	8.5/10
PlayStation: The Official Magazine	9/10
Digital Spy	4/5
The Escapist	4/5

The game was met with positive to average reception upon release. GameRankings and Metacritic gave it a score of 79.90% and 78 out of 100 for the Xbox 360 version; 79.47% and 79 out of 100 for the PlayStation 3 version; 75% and 75 out of 100 for the Wii version; and 66% and 71 out of 100 for the iOS version.

Digital Spy gave the Xbox 360 version a score of four stars out of five and stated: "A severe lack of additional game modes and revolutionary new features means that many of the tweaks will only really be noticeable to hardcore fans. Casual onlookers can rest assured, however, that Madden NFL 12 is one mighty fine football game and worth checking out if you've been on the bench for a few years." The Digital Fix also gave it eight out of ten and said, "If you are into sports, EA consistently lead the field and you could do a lot worse than picking this one up. If you are an American football fan, it's a must buy." The Escapist similarly gave it four stars out of five and said, "If you haven't picked up a copy of Madden in a while, 12 is a lot of fun. If you're still getting fun out of more recent versions, there's nothing here you can't live without." However, The A.V. Club gave it a B− and said that the "greatest problem" is that the game "replicates watching the NFL more than it does playing NFL football. While that serves the millions who play year after year, it leaves NFL fans who want something more waiting for EA's exclusive contract with the league to end."

During the 15th Annual Interactive Achievement Awards, the Academy of Interactive Arts & Sciences nominated Madden NFL 12 for "Sports Game of the Year".

== Sales ==
As of October 2011, over 3 million copies of the game have been sold across all platforms.

== Hall of Fame edition ==
A special "Hall of Fame" cover was also announced, with Madden NFL 2003 cover athlete and 2011 Hall of Fame inductee Marshall Faulk appearing in his St. Louis Rams uniform. One of four autographed Panini trading cards featuring Faulk is included in each copy. Two valuable cards (one for the Xbox 360 and one for the PlayStation 3) are made up of 18 karat gold. In Ultimate Team mode, there is a Platinum Pack featuring thirteen Hall of Famers and former cover athletes. This version is only available in region 1 formats for sale in the United States.

== See also ==
- NCAA Football 12
- Madden NFL
