= NCAA Football 07 =

2006 video game

- Developer: EA Tiburon
- Publisher: EA Sports
- Platforms: PS2, Xbox, Xbox 360, PSP
- Release: US: July 18, 2006
- Genres: Sports, American football
- Modes: Single-player, multiplayer

NCAA Football 07 is a collegiate football video game published by Electronic Arts. It is the successor to NCAA Football 06 in the NCAA Football series. The product features former USC player Reggie Bush on the cover. While there weren't any new, major features added to the PlayStation 2 and Xbox games, tweaks were added to improve the existing features.

The theme for 07 is "Turn the Tide". Like the 2005 version said for home-field advantage, this year's version emphasizes that momentum is more important in college football than any other sport. This is illustrated by a momentum meter on the score graphic at the top (or bottom, in the case of the Xbox 360 version) of the screen. The more the meter is shifted towards a team, the better its players will perform.

NCAA Football 07 also includes spring drills, an update to Race for the Heisman mode called Campus Legend (which plays more like NFL Superstar mode in Madden), ESPN integration, and a spring game in Dynasty and Campus Legend modes. ESPN integration is expected to increase with the next NCAA Football releases.

== Campus Legend ==
Campus Legend, for the most part, runs on the same system as its predecessor, Race for the Heisman. One creates a player, goes to a football camp, performs in drills, and is awarded a scholarship to play for a Division I-A program. However, changes begin right from the start of camp. ^{Campus Legend was not available on the Xbox 360 Version of the game.}

=== Camp ===
Rather than picking one drill to participate in, the player participates in a series of four drills which vary by position. (e.g. player gains attribute points - one to sixteen points depending on the performance - by repeatedly tapping A on the Xbox during the 40 Yard Dash.)

=== Picking a school ===
Screenshot of in-game action between Virginia Tech and Virginia at Lane Stadium

Another change in NCAA Football 07 is which schools which the player can attend. Rather than choosing one of three scholarships or applying as a walk-on to another program, performance in camp determines player points and the distribution of said points determines the skill of players.

=== The Dorm ===
Once moved into the dorm, a player is required to choose a major. While some are legitimate (e.g. chemistry, sports medicine, English), others are rather odd (e.g. ESPN, 1-AA team nicknames, sports geography). Academic performance will improve a player's ratings, but one must choose a major that improves relevant ratings. For example, a quarterback would not want to major in something that would improve his tackling ability. Also added is an NCAA progress report, where players can check their GPA, athletic goals, attribute point bonuses, and popularity; a computer to check rankings anywhere from the Heisman watch to All-Americans to the coaches' and AP polls; a closet to edit appearance, gear, and attribute points; and a school magazine chronicling headlines from the player's team. The dorm room also featured a picture of the player's current girlfriend, with the beauty depending on the player's success; this feature was removed for the following year's game.

=== During the year ===
Campus Legend introduces a challenge for the player to balance academic performance, athletic performance, and campus popularity in hopes of becoming the greatest to ever attend his school. Each weekday on the calendar in the dorm has a morning, afternoon, and evening event. The morning event is always classes (with the exception of the midterm and final exams), and is automatically simulated (unless it's an aforementioned test). The afternoon event is always practice, where one can earn attribute points if he performs well enough. The evening event gives the player a choice of studying (a pop-up on the screen that gives the answer to a potential exam question), meeting with a tutor (a two-night event where one receives a five-question quiz to improve his GPA), participating in a position drill (a two-night event where the player takes part in one of his position's four specific drills from camp to earn attribute points), or participating in a campus social activity, which boosts popularity. Weekends are simulated except for the game, if there is one that weekend.

== NCAA Football 07 on the Xbox 360 ==
The Xbox 360 version of the game was thought by many to be incomplete as it lacked features of the console versions such as Campus Legend mode and Spring Drills. However, the game featured several mini-games of its own such as bowling, where the player is put at the 20-yard line of the opponent's end zone and a touchdown is considered a strike and if a touchdown scored on a second-down play is a spare, as in bowling. Graphics in the game were well-done and showed great representation. Other problems with the game were offensive or created or edited players in the game imported to Madden NFL 07 were un-signable at a rating of "99" and contracted at a high amount of money which were over the game's salary cap. Also, draft classes had defensive players as listed as top five picks and very few offensive players were top five or top ten picks in the NFL Draft. "Create-a-player" required the player to insert the player's name and gear, but the player's look or appearance could not be changed after the player was created. Also unlike Madden 07 players ratings and names could be edited.

== Awards & Reception ==
The Xbox version of the game is the most critically successful, receiving an 87.8% on GameRankings.

=== Awards ===
- Received IGN's award for Best PS2 Sports Game of 2006.
- Gaming Target - "52 Games We'll Still Be Playing From 2006" selection

== Sales ==
The game sold 2.5 million copies.
