= Kewan Lacy =

American football running back (born 2006)

No. 5 – Ole Miss Rebels
- Position: Running back
- Class: Junior

Personal information
- Born: July 6, 2006 (age 20); Dallas, Texas, U.S.
- Listed height: 5 ft 11 in (1.80 m)
- Listed weight: 210 lb (95 kg)

Career information
- High school: Lancaster (Lancaster, Texas)
- College: Missouri (2024); Ole Miss (2025–present)

Awards and highlights
- First-team All-American (2025); First-team All-SEC (2025)
- Stats at ESPN

Kewan Duntrell Lacy (KEE-wahn; born July 6, 2006) is an American college football running back for the Ole Miss Rebels. He previously played for the Missouri Tigers.

== Early life ==
Kewan Duntrell Lacy attended Fort Worth Nolan in Fort Worth, Texas, for his freshman and sophomore seasons. Despite only five carries as a freshman, Lacy exploded in his sophomore campaign, amassing 1,352 yards and 13 touchdowns on 135 carries. Eventually, he transferred to Lancaster High School in Lancaster, Texas. In Lacy's first season with the Tigers, his production was split with Arizona State University commit Kyson Brown. Lacy finished the season with 527 yards and 10 total touchdowns on 79 touches. In between seasons, he posted times of 10.79 and 10.81 in the 100 m dash As a senior, he rushed for 1,513 yards on 221 carries with 19 touchdowns. Despite earning 29 offers from schools such as Alabama, Ohio State, and Miami (FL), he committed to the University of Missouri to play college football.

== College career ==
In his lone year at Missouri, his true freshman year in 2024, Lacy played in six games and rushed for 104 yards on 23 carries. After the season, he transferred to the University of Mississippi. In his first year at Ole Miss in 2025, he entered the season as the starting running back. Lacy rushed for 108 yards with three touchdowns in his first game. On November 8th, 2025 Lacy tied the Ole Miss single-season rushing touchdown record with 15.

=== Statistics ===
Legend
	Led FBS
**Bold**	Career high

Year	Team	Games		Rushing				Receiving			
Year	Team	GP	GS	Att	Yds	Avg	TD	Rec	Yds	Avg	TD
2024	Missouri	6	0	23	104	4.5	0	2	9	4.5	0
2025	Ole Miss	**15**	**15**	**306**	**1,567**	**5.1**	**24**	**29**	**177**	**6.1**	0
2026	Ole Miss	6	6	78	388	5.0	5	10	33	3.3	0
Career		27	21	407	2,059	5.1	29	41	219	5.3	0

== Personal life ==
Lacy was one of the cover athletes for EA Sports College Football 27 alongside Dante Moore and Malachi Toney.
