= NCAA Football 99 =

1998 video game

- Developer: EA Tiburon
- Publisher: EA Sports
- Platforms: PlayStation, Microsoft Windows
- Release: PlayStation: NA: August 6, 1998; Windows: NA: September 4, 1998
- Genre: Sports
- Modes: Single player, multiplayer

NCAA Football 99 is a sports video game released by EA Sports in 1998, the 1999 installment of its college football game series. The cover features Michigan Wolverines cornerback Charles Woodson.

== Gameplay ==
NCAA Football 99 includes the 1998 rosters of more than one hundred teams from division 1A and features stadiums, uniforms, and fight songs for the teams. The game includes 80 historical so that players can recreate past college football games. It also features an exhibition game between the 1997 AP Poll national champion team Michigan Wolverines against the 1997 Coaches Poll champion team Nebraska Cornhuskers.

A play editor allows the player to draw up a play and practice it on field, while a "coaches camera" can be used to show the play diagram transparently drawn on the playing field.

== Reception ==
Reception

Aggregate score
Aggregator	Score	
Aggregator	PC	PS
GameRankings	78%	83%

Review scores
Publication	Score	
Publication	PC	PS
AllGame	2/5	4.5/5
CNET Gamecenter	8/10	8/10
Computer Games Strategy Plus	3.5/5	N/A
Computer Gaming World	4/5	N/A
Electronic Gaming Monthly	N/A	8.625/10
Game Informer	N/A	7.75/10
GamePro	3.5/5 (Note: GamePro gave the PC version 3/5 for graphics, 4.5/5 for sound, 4/5 for control, and 3.5/5 for overall fun factor.)	4/5 (Note: GamePro gave the PlayStation version two 4.5/5 scores for graphics and sound, and two 4/5 scores for control and overall fun factor.)
GameRevolution	C+	A−
GameSpot	6.7/10	7.8/10
IGN	7/10	7.8/10
Next Generation	N/A	3/5
Official U.S. PlayStation Magazine	N/A	4.5/5
PC Accelerator	8/10	N/A
PC Gamer (US)	92%	N/A
The Cincinnati Enquirer	4/5	N/A

The game received favorable reviews on both platforms according to the review aggregation website GameRankings. Next Generation said of the PlayStation version, "Although it doesn't break any new ground, NCAA 99 has enough new features and improvements to make it a worthwhile purchase."

In its first month of release, NCAA Football 99 was the fourth best-selling home console game in the United States (behind both home console versions of WWF War Zone and Banjo-Kazooie). The staff of PC Gamer US nominated the PC version as the best sports game of 1998, although it lost to NBA Live 99. They wrote that the former "turned out to be the year's finest pigskin offering, despite a healthy challenge from EA Sports' own Madden NFL 99."
