= NCAA Football 2005 =

2004 video game

- Developer: EA Tiburon
- Publisher: EA Sports
- Series: NCAA Football
- Platforms: PlayStation 2, Xbox, GameCube
- Release: NA: July 14, 2004
- Genre: Sports
- Modes: Single-player, multiplayer

NCAA Football 2005 is an American college football video game which was released by EA Sports in July 2004. It is the successor to NCAA Football 2004 in the NCAA Football series. Former Pittsburgh Panthers wide receiver Larry Fitzgerald is the cover.

== Gameplay ==
The main focus of NCAA Football 2005 is home-field advantage. The major addition to the 2005 game is the "Top 25 Toughest Places to Play," compiled by EA Sports. These rankings are based on home winning percentage, average attendance, and "atmosphere" (i.e., fan rowdiness and noise).

Players with the home field advantage on defense can increase the crowd's volume before the snap by repeatedly pressing a certain button on the controller, depending on the system. Likewise, the player with the home field advantage on offense can quiet the crowd with one press of the same button. Crowd noise may affect the quarterback's ability to get an audible across to his other players. If the noise is sufficient, when the quarterback tries to call an audible, one of his teammates will come down to him and gesture that he can't understand him.

NCAA Football 2005 supported online multiplayer for up to 4 players. While Xbox Live support for games on the original Xbox ended in 2010, NCAA Football 2005 is now playable online with Insignia, a revival server restoring online functionality to original Xbox games

== Reception ==
Reception

Aggregate scores
| Aggregator | Score |
|---|---|
| GameRankings | (PS2) 89.45% (Xbox) 88.40% (GC) 88.01% |
| Metacritic | (Xbox) 89/100 (PS2) 88/100 (GC) 88/100 |

Review scores
| Publication | Score |
|---|---|
| Electronic Gaming Monthly | 9.17/10 |
| Game Informer | 9.25/10 |
| GamePro | 5/5 (GC) 4.5/5 |
| GameRevolution | (PS2) A− (Xbox) B+ |
| GameSpot | (PS2) 8.5/10 (Xbox) 8.2/10 (GC) 8/10 |
| GameSpy | 4.5/5 (GC) 4/5 |
| GameZone | 9.7/10 |
| IGN | 8.7/10 (GC) 8.5/10 |
| Nintendo Power | 4.5/5 |
| Official U.S. PlayStation Magazine | 4.5/5 |
| Official Xbox Magazine (US) | 9.1/10 |
| Maxim | 10/10 |

The game was met with very positive reception upon release. GameRankings and Metacritic gave it a score of 89.45% and 88 out of 100 for the PlayStation 2 version; 88.40% and 89 out of 100 for the Xbox version; and 88.01% and 88 out of 100 for the GameCube version.
