= Dante Moore =

American football player (born 2005)

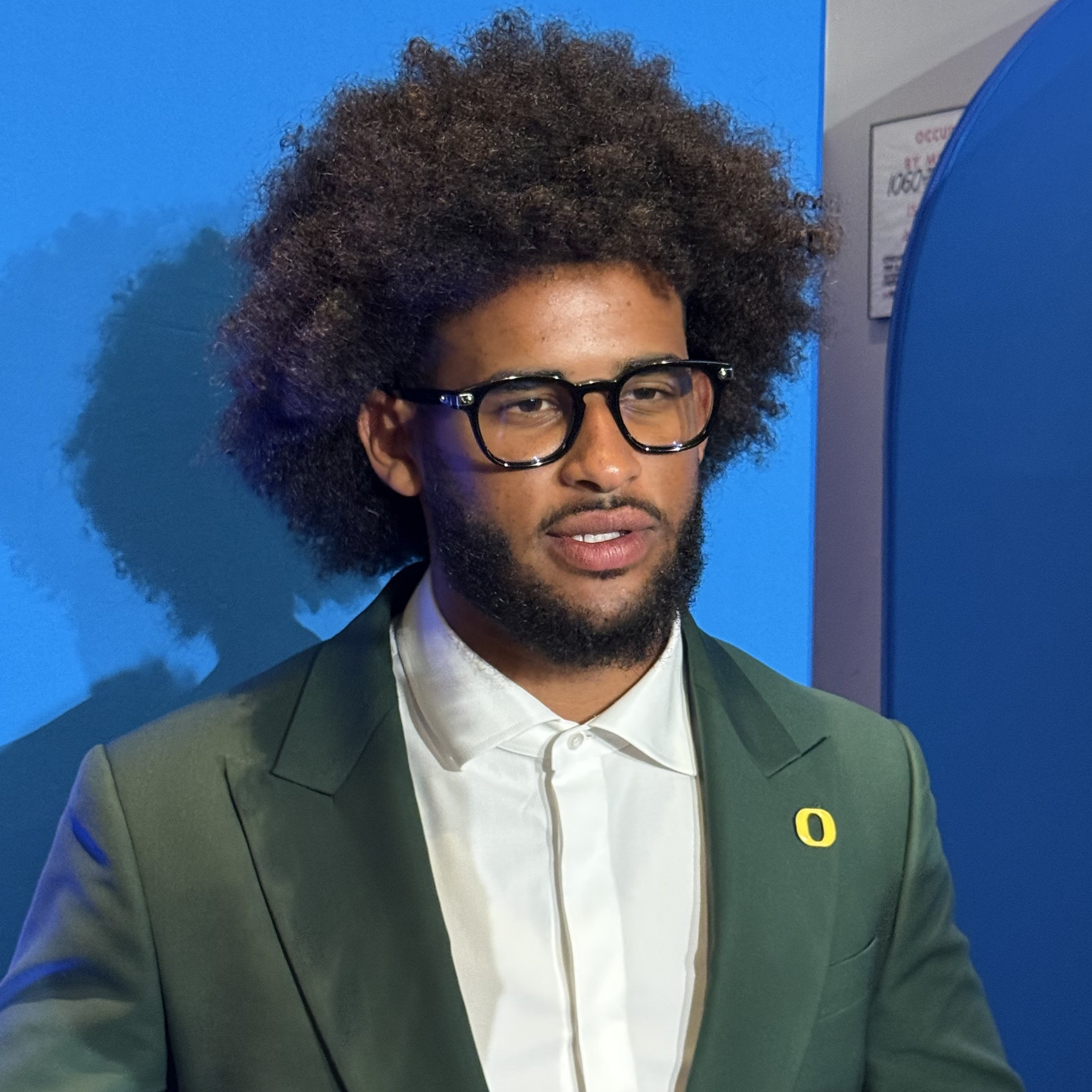
- Moore at 2026 Big Ten Media Day

No. 5 – Oregon Ducks
- Position: Quarterback
- Class: (redshirt) Junior

Personal information
- Born: May 24, 2005 (age 21); East Cleveland, Ohio, U.S.
- Listed height: 6 ft 3 in (1.91 m)
- Listed weight: 206 lb (93 kg)

Career information
- High school: Martin Luther King (Detroit, Michigan)
- College: UCLA (2023); Oregon (2024–present)

Awards and highlights
- Third-team All-Big Ten (2025)
- Stats at ESPN

Dante Moore (born May 24, 2005) is an American college football quarterback for the Oregon Ducks. He previously played for the UCLA Bruins in 2023.

== Early life ==
Moore was born on May 24, 2005, in East Cleveland, Ohio, and grew up in nearby Elyria. He later moved to Detroit, Michigan and attended Martin Luther King High School (MLK). He weighed 155 pounds (70 kg) as a freshman and gained 50 pounds over the next two seasons. Moore passed for 3,044 yards with 40 touchdowns against three interceptions during his junior season while MLK won the Division III state championship. Moore led MLK to a second straight state title as a senior while passing for 2,392 yards and 32 touchdowns with three interceptions. He was selected to play in the 2023 All-American Bowl. Moore finished his high school career with 9,880 passing yards and 135 touchdown passes.

Moore was rated the best recruit in his class by Sports Illustrated. He initially committed to play college football at Oregon entering his senior year. Moore had the option to meet with Oregon's name, image and likeness (NIL) collectives during his official visit, but opted against doing so. Moore flipped his commitment to UCLA. He is the highest-rated quarterback to ever commit to play for the Bruins. Moore signed his National Letter of Intent to UCLA on December 21, 2022.

== College career ==
=== UCLA ===
Moore joined the UCLA Bruins as an early enrollee in January 2023. He was trying to become the Bruins' first true freshman to start the season opener at quarterback since Josh Rosen in 2015. However, UCLA coach Chip Kelly named junior Ethan Garbers the starter, while also saying that Moore and transfer quarterback Collin Schlee would also play in the opener. The Bruins won their season opener 27–13 over Coastal Carolina. Moore completed seven of 12 passes for two touchdowns and an interception. Playing in five drives, he led the Bruins to 212 yards on 31 plays for 20 points. Moore started the following week in a 35–10 win against San Diego State. He was 17-of-27 passing for 290 yards in only three quarters, and his three touchdown passes tied the school record for a true freshman held by Rosen and Cade McNown. He barely played the next week, a blowout win over North Carolina Central.

In the following game against Utah, Moore's first pass was intercepted for a touchdown. He was pressured by the Utes, sacked seven times and losing a fumble in a 14–7 loss. The game started a streak of three straight games in which he threw a pick-six, resulting in Kelly returning to Garbers as the starter. Moore played in most of the regular-season finale against California after Garbers left with an arm injury in UCLA's opening drive. In his first play from Cal's 20-yard line, Moore threw into heavy coverage for an interception in the end zone. The Bruins lost 33–7, with Moore completing 23 of 38 passes for 266 yards with one touchdown and two interceptions. He lost a fumble and was sacked six times. Moore entered the transfer portal on November 30, 2023.

=== Oregon ===
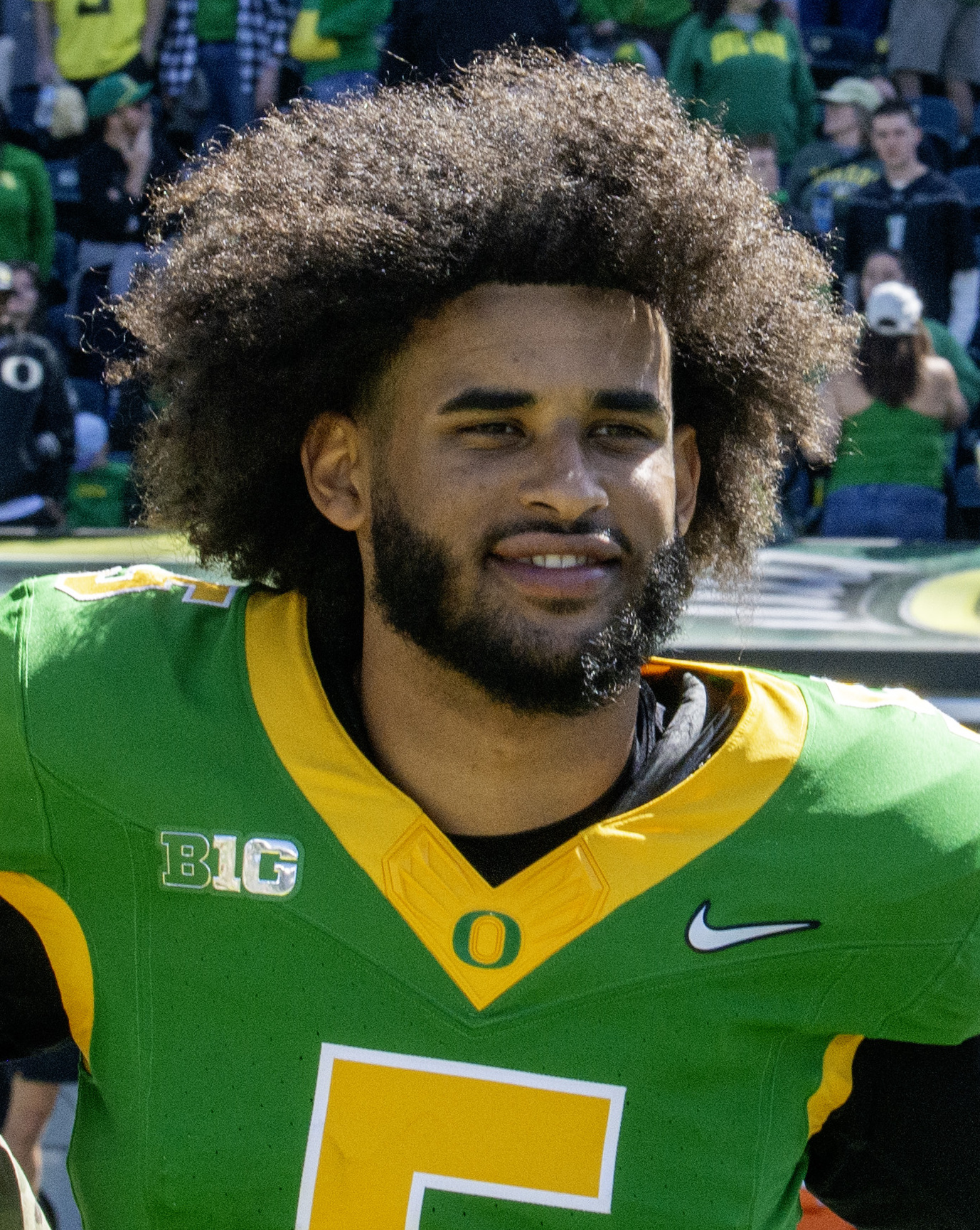
Moore at the 2026 Oregon spring game.

On December 18, 2023, Moore announced that he would be transferring to Oregon. In 2024, Moore was the primary backup to transfer quarterback Dillon Gabriel. He made his Ducks debut in a Week 3 victory over Oregon State. On the season, he appeared in five games, including the College Football Playoff quarterfinal against Ohio State, while preserving his redshirt. He finished the season completing seven of eight passes for 49 yards.

Moore won the starting quarterback competition over Austin Novosad for the 2025 season. He made his first start for the Ducks in the season opener against Montana State, completing 18 of 23 passes for 213 yards and three touchdowns in the victory. In Week 5 against No. 3 Penn State, he threw a game-winning touchdown pass to Gary Bryant Jr. in double overtime, a 25-yard score that secured a 30–24 victory. The following week, Oregon fell to No. 7 Indiana before winning its final six games of the regular season. Finishing the regular season with an 11–1 record and ranked No. 5, the Ducks faced No. 24 James Madison in the first round of the College Football Playoff. In a 51–34 victory, Moore completed 19 of 27 passes for a season-high 313 yards, four touchdowns, and two interceptions while adding a rushing touchdown. Moore led the Ducks to a quarterfinal victory against No. 4 Texas Tech before falling to eventual national champion Indiana in a rematch. On the season, Moore completed 296 of 412 passes for 3,565 yards, 30 touchdowns, and 10 interceptions while adding 156 rushing yards and two touchdowns. For his performance, he was named Third-team All-Big Ten.

Despite being considered a top prospect for the 2026 NFL Draft, Moore did not enter the draft and returned to college.

In October 2026, Moore was expected to miss the rest of the 2026-2027 season after suffering a hit to the head in a game. He suffered a concussion during the game against the USC Trojans on September 26th when Desman Stephens II hit him.

=== College statistics ===
Year	Team	Games			Passing								Rushing			
Year	Team	GP	GS	Record	Cmp	Att	Pct	Yds	Y/A	TD	Int	Rtg	Att	Yds	Avg	TD
2023	UCLA	9	5	3−2	114	213	53.5	1,610	7.6	11	9	125.6	45	-84	-1.9	0
2024	Oregon	5	0	—	7	8	87.5	49	6.1	0	0	139.0	1	6	6.0	0
2025	Oregon	15	15	13–2	296	412	71.8	3,565	8.7	30	10	163.7	73	156	2.1	2
2026	Oregon	4	4	3−1	69	99	69.7	926	9.4	9	0	178.3	10	-7	-0.7	0
Career		33	24	19–5	486	732	66.4	6,150	8.4	50	19	154.3	129	71	0.6	2

== Personal life ==
Moore was one of the cover athletes for EA Sports College Football 27 alongside Kewan Lacy and Malachi Toney.
