= Bill Walsh College Football '95 =

1994 video game

- Cover art
- Developer: High Score Productions
- Publisher: EA Sports
- Designers: Scott Orr; Kevin Hogan; Jim Simmons
- Composers: Joel Simmons; Jim Simmons
- Series: NCAA Football
- Platform: Sega Genesis
- Release: NA: August 1994
- Genre: Sports (American football)
- Modes: Single-player; Multiplayer

Bill Walsh College Football '95 is a video game of the sports genre released in 1994 by EA Sports, and a follow-up to Bill Walsh College Football.

== Gameplay ==
It features former NFL and then Stanford Cardinal football head coach Bill Walsh on the cover and several Stanford players. It also features the 1993 rosters of the college football teams featured.

== Reception ==
Reception

Review scores
Publication	Score
GameFan	93%
GamePro	4.5/5 stars
