= EA Orlando =

Video game development studio by EA

- Formerly: Tiburon Entertainment (1994–1998); EA Tiburon (1998–2023)
- Type: Private (1994–98); Subsidiary (1998–present)
- Industry: Video games
- Founded: 1994; 32 years ago
- Founder: John Schappert; Jason Andersen; Steve Chiang
- Headquarters: Orlando, Florida, U.S.
- Products: Video games
- Brands: Current; Madden NFL; NCAA Football; Tiger Woods PGA Tour; List: Former; EA Sports Fantasy Football; NBA Live (2010–2018); EA Sports MMA (2010); EA Sports NASCAR series (2002–2009); NFL Head Coach (2006–2008); NFL Tour (2008); EA Sports GameShow (2008); NFL Street (2004–2006); Arena Football (2006–2007); NASCAR SimRacing (2005); Soviet Strike (Sega Saturn version); Nuclear Strike (PC version); MechWarrior 3050; Superman Returns; Superman Returns: Fortress of Solitude; GoldenEye: Rogue Agent (Nintendo DS version); Henry Hatsworth in the Puzzling Adventure
- Number of employees: 500 (2015)
- Parent: EA Sports (1998–present)
- Website: ea.com/ea-orlando

EA Orlando is an American video game developer located in Orlando, Florida, founded in 1994. It was formerly known as Tiburon Entertainment, which was acquired by Electronic Arts in 1998. After the acquisition, the studio was renamed EA Tiburon. EA had already purchased a minority equity interest in Tiburon in May 1996, the terms of which included that Tiburon would develop games exclusively for EA.

The studio is best known for developing the Madden NFL series of games. In addition to the usual titles developed by the studio which include Madden, NCAA Football, NFL Street, NASCAR, and NFL Head Coach, in late 2006 Tiburon released the Superman Returns game based on the movie of the same name. EA Tiburon has taken over the Tiger Woods PGA Tour series from EA Salt Lake as of the 2008 edition of the game.

== History ==
=== Tiburon Entertainment ===
Tiburon Entertainment was originally founded by John Schappert, Jason Andersen, and Steve Chiang, all of them being previous engineers for the company Visual Concepts, located in Cincinnati, Ohio. Soon after leaving Visual Concepts, Schappert and Anderson would move to Florida and begin working towards opening a new video game software developing studio. Tiburon Entertainment was soon established in Orlando, Florida, 1994 by Schappert and Anderson, with Steve Chiang joining as a third investment. The name of the studio, Tiburon, comes from the Spanish word "tiburón," which means shark. While the newly formed company had just three employees and 900 feet of office space at the time, it did carve a niche for itself by writing programs for large gaming companies like EA.

Tiburon developed its own video game concepts and software in addition to creating games based on the ideas of Electronic Arts and other distributors. EA initially hired Tiburon to produce Madden NFL '96 for the Super NES and Genesis. Tiburon began producing Madden for the newer systems and were the first designers to infuse the game with a three-dimensional feel for the players and stadiums for the two-game systems until they became outdated with the introduction of Sony's PlayStation. Eventually, Tiburon would start developing the Madden video game series, starting with Madden NFL '96 and NCAA Football.

Some other titles that Tiburon made include College Football USA 97, Madden NFL 97, Soviet Strike, and Slam: Shaq vs. the Legends which were released on several game consoles such as the Genesis, Super NES, Sega Saturn and PlayStation.

=== Tiburon Entertainment and Electronic Arts ===
Tiburon Entertainment logo

The relationship between EA and Tiburon has existed since the company's beginnings. While Tiburon developed programs for large gaming companies, the company had some strong ties to EA because of the work done on the Madden series by Schappert, Anderson, and Chiang, who had done business with EA when they were working at Visual Concepts.

EA was already a minority investor in the privately held company Tiburon and owned about 19.9 percent of Tiburon since April 1996. Later on, EA would soon purchase a minority equity interest of Tiburon on May 7, 1996. Included in this purchase, Tiburon would become an exclusive developer for Electronic Arts for entertainment software on the PlayStation, Sega Saturn, and other video-game systems. In 1996 Tiburon would form a contract with EA to help develop a new college football game (which became NCAA Football 98, released in 1997). With this investment made, the company would move from its 4,000-square-foot office in Longwood to an 8,600-square-foot site in Maitland Center.

=== Acquisition by EA (1998–present) ===
The EA/Tiburon partnership flourished as Tiburon continued to design top-selling interactive game software for EA and led to the acquisition of Tiburon by EA on April 2, 1998. Since the purchase, Tiburon Entertainment was re-branded to EA Tiburon and became a wholly owned subsidiary of Electronic Arts. Along with this, the studio went on to oversee the Madden franchise and still continues to do so to this day. In 2005, EA acquired the video game developer Hypnotix and folded its operations into Tiburon. EA had also constructed a new 25,000 square foot state-of-the-art creative center that would house the designers, programmers, and artists of Tiburon Entertainment. EA Tiburon was a division of EA Sports, but with some recent reorganization of the company, there have been some changes and now is its own independent subsidiary.

Currently, EA Tiburon is still considered one of the largest video game studios in Florida and is employing over 500 people. Over the past few years, there have been other developing teams that have been incorporated into EA Tiburon such as Hypnotix after EA acquired some smaller video game development companies. EA Tiburon's Maitland headquarters continues to have renovations and expansions done to the building with the intent to allow employees to move more easily between workspaces and foster more collaboration. Some other additions include an updated infrastructure and video-game themed art along the walls of each floor.

In late 2019, it was announced that EA Tiburon would move its headquarters from the Maitland Center to the Creative Village in Downtown Orlando. The new headquarters opened in March 2022.

== Games developed by Tiburon ==
Ongoing franchises

- Madden NFL series (1995–present)
- PGA Tour (2007–present)
- NCAA/College Football (1998–2013, 2024–present)

Former franchises

- EA Sports Fantasy Football
- NBA Live (2010–2018)
- EA Sports MMA (2010)
- EA Sports NASCAR series (2002–2009)
- NFL Head Coach series (2006–2008)
- NFL Tour (2008)
- EA Sports GameShow (2008)
- NFL Street series (2004–2006)
- Arena Football series (2006–2007)
- NASCAR SimRacing (2005)
- Soviet Strike (Sega Saturn version)
- Nuclear Strike (PC version)
- MechWarrior 3050
- Superman Returns
- Superman Returns: Fortress of Solitude
- GoldenEye: Rogue Agent (Nintendo DS version)
- Henry Hatsworth in the Puzzling Adventure
