= List of Electronic Arts games: 2010–2019 =

This is a list of video games published or developed by Electronic Arts. Since 1983 and the 1987 release of its Skate or Die!, it has respectively published and developed games, bundles, as well as a handful of earlier productivity software. Only versions of games developed or published by EA, as well as those versions' years of release, are listed.

Legend
Developed and published by EA
Only developed by EA
Only published by EA
Only distributed by EA

List of released video games
Title	Release date	Platforms	Developer(s)	Ref(s)
Army of Two: The 40th Day	January 12, 2010	PlayStation 3	EA Montreal	
Army of Two: The 40th Day	January 12, 2010	Xbox 360	EA Montreal	
Army of Two: The 40th Day	January 12, 2010	PlayStation Portable	Buzz Monkey	
Risk: Factions	January 12, 2010	Xbox Live Arcade	Stainless Games / Powerhouse Animation Studios, Inc.	
Risk: Factions	December 21, 2010	PlayStation Network	Stainless Games / Powerhouse Animation Studios, Inc.	
Risk: Factions	March 8, 2011	Windows	Stainless Games / Powerhouse Animation Studios, Inc.	
Spore Creatures	January 15, 2010	iOS	Griptonite Games	
Mass Effect 2	January 26, 2010	Windows	BioWare	
Mass Effect 2	January 26, 2010	Xbox 360	BioWare	
Mass Effect 2	January 18, 2011	PlayStation 3	BioWare	
Extreme Pinball	January 28, 2010	PlayStation Network	Epic MegaGames / Digital Extremes / High Score Entertainment	
The Sims 3 Stuff packs	February 2, 2010–September 10, 2013	Macintosh	Maxis Redwood Shores	
The Sims 3 Stuff packs	February 2, 2010–September 10, 2013	Windows	Maxis Redwood Shores	
Dante's Inferno	February 4, 2010	PlayStation 3	Visceral Games	
Dante's Inferno	February 4, 2010	Xbox 360	Visceral Games	
Dante's Inferno	February 25, 2010	PlayStation Portable	Artificial Mind and Movement	
Battlefield Bad Company 2	March 2, 2010	PlayStation 3	EA DICE	
Battlefield Bad Company 2	March 2, 2010	Windows	Coldwood Interactive	
Battlefield Bad Company 2	March 2, 2010	Xbox 360	EA DICE	
Battlefield Bad Company 2	December 16, 2010	iOS	EA DICE	
Battlefield Bad Company 2	June 20, 2012	Kindle Fire	EA DICE	
Command & Conquer 4: Tiberian Twilight	March 16, 2010	Windows	EA Los Angeles	
Command & Conquer 4: Tiberian Twilight	March 16, 2010	Xbox 360	EA Los Angeles	
Dragon Age: Origins – Awakening	March 16, 2010	Macintosh	BioWare Edmonton	
Dragon Age: Origins – Awakening	March 16, 2010	PlayStation 3	BioWare Edmonton	
Dragon Age: Origins – Awakening	March 16, 2010	Windows	BioWare Edmonton	
Dragon Age: Origins – Awakening	March 16, 2010	Xbox 360	BioWare Edmonton	
Mirror's Edge	April 1, 2010	iOS	EA DICE	
Mirror's Edge	July 13, 2012	Windows Phone	EA DICE	
Tiger Woods PGA Tour Online	April 9, 2010	Windows	EA Sports	
Surviving High School	April 19, 2010	Nintendo DS	Centerscore / EA Mobile	
Surviving High School	December 22, 2011	Android	Centerscore / EA Mobile	
2010 FIFA World Cup South Africa	April 27, 2010	PlayStation 3	EA Canada	
2010 FIFA World Cup South Africa	April 27, 2010	PlayStation Portable	HB Studios	
2010 FIFA World Cup South Africa	April 27, 2010	Wii	HB Studios	
2010 FIFA World Cup South Africa	April 27, 2010	Xbox 360	EA Canada	
2010 FIFA World Cup South Africa	June 28, 2010	iOS	EA Canada	
Lord of Ultima	April 20, 2010	Windows	EA Phenomic	
Skate It	May 10, 2010	iOS	EA Black Box	
Skate 3	May 11, 2010	PlayStation 3	EA Black Box	
Skate 3	May 11, 2010	Xbox 360	EA Black Box	
EA Sports FIFA Superstars	May 26, 2010	Facebook	Playfish / Electronic Arts	
FIFA Online	May 26, 2010	Windows	BGEntertainment	
The Sims 3: Ambitions	June 1, 2010	iOS	EA Mobile	
The Sims 3: Ambitions	June 1, 2010	Macintosh	Maxis Redwood Shores	
The Sims 3: Ambitions	June 1, 2010	Mobile phones	Maxis Redwood Shores	
The Sims 3: Ambitions	June 1, 2010	Windows	Maxis Redwood Shores	
Green Day: Rock Band	June 8, 2010	PlayStation 3	Harmonix / Demiurge Studios	
Green Day: Rock Band	June 8, 2010	Wii	Harmonix / Demiurge Studios	
Green Day: Rock Band	June 8, 2010	Xbox 360	Harmonix / Demiurge Studios	
Tiger Woods PGA Tour 11	June 8, 2010	iOS	EA Tiburon	
Tiger Woods PGA Tour 11	June 8, 2010	PlayStation 3	EA Tiburon	
Tiger Woods PGA Tour 11	June 8, 2010	Wii	EA Tiburon	
Tiger Woods PGA Tour 11	June 8, 2010	Xbox 360	EA Tiburon	
NCAA Football	June 24, 2010	iOS	EA Tiburon / EA Canada	
APB: All Points Bulletin	June 29, 2010	Windows	Realtime Worlds	
DeathSpank	July 13, 2010	PlayStation 3	Hothead Games	
DeathSpank	July 14, 2010	Xbox 360	Hothead Games	
DeathSpank	October 26, 2010	Windows	Hothead Games	
DeathSpank	December 14, 2010	Macintosh	Hothead Games	
Dragon's Lair (Note: EA was only involved in publishing the iOS version of this seminal arcade game.)	July 2010	iOS	Digital Leisure	
NCAA Football 11	July 13, 2010	PlayStation 2	EA Tiburon / EA Canada	
NCAA Football 11	July 13, 2010	PlayStation 3	EA Tiburon / EA Canada	
NCAA Football 11	July 13, 2010	Xbox 360	EA Tiburon / EA Canada	
SimCity 4 Deluxe Edition	July 20, 2010	Windows	Maxis	
The Sims 3 Collector's Edition	July 20, 2010	Android	Maxis Redwood Shores	
Need for Speed: World	July 27, 2010	Windows	Quicklime Games / EA Singapore	
SimCity Deluxe	July 29, 2010	Android	Maxis	
SimCity Deluxe	July 29, 2010	iOS	Maxis	
SimCity Deluxe	October 10, 2011	BlackBerry	Maxis	
Madden NFL 11	August 6, 2010	iOS	EA Tiburon / EA Canada	
Madden NFL 11	August 10, 2010	BlackBerry	EA Tiburon / EA Canada	
Madden NFL 11	August 10, 2010	PlayStation 2	EA Tiburon / EA Canada	
Madden NFL 11	August 10, 2010	PlayStation 3	EA Tiburon / EA Canada	
Madden NFL 11	August 10, 2010	PlayStation Portable	EA Tiburon / EA Canada	
Madden NFL 11	August 10, 2010	Wii	EA Tiburon / EA Canada	
Madden NFL 11	August 10, 2010	Xbox 360	EA Tiburon / EA Canada	
Shank	August 25, 2010	PlayStation 3	Klei Entertainment	
Shank	August 25, 2010	Xbox 360	Klei Entertainment	
Shank	October 25, 2010	Windows	Klei Entertainment	
Shank	October 23, 2012	Macintosh	Klei Entertainment	
Shank	May 23, 2013	Linux	Klei Entertainment	
R-Type	August 26, 2010	iOS	Irem	
Madden NFL Superstars	August 31, 2010	Facebook	Playfish	
NHL 11	September 7, 2010	PlayStation 3	EA Canada	
NHL 11	September 7, 2010	Xbox 360	EA Canada	
NHL Slapshot	September 7, 2010	Wii	EA Canada	
Lite-Brite	September 9, 2010	iOS	Hasbro / Electronic Arts	
DeathSpank: Thongs of Virtue	September 21, 2010	PlayStation 3	Hothead Games	
DeathSpank: Thongs of Virtue	September 22, 2010	Xbox 360	Hothead Games	
DeathSpank: Thongs of Virtue	November 30, 2010	Windows	Hothead Games	
DeathSpank: Thongs of Virtue	December 14, 2010	Macintosh	Hothead Games	
FIFA 11	September 28, 2010	Android	HB Studios	
FIFA 11	September 28, 2010	Blackberry	HB Studios	
FIFA 11	September 28, 2010	iOS	HB Studios	
FIFA 11	September 28, 2010	Java Me	HB Studios	
FIFA 11	September 28, 2010	Macintosh	EA Canada	
FIFA 11	September 28, 2010	Nintendo DS	Exient Entertainment	
FIFA 11	September 28, 2010	PlayStation 2	HB Studios	
FIFA 11	September 28, 2010	PlayStation 3	EA Canada	
FIFA 11	September 28, 2010	PlayStation Portable	HB Studios	
FIFA 11	September 28, 2010	Wii	EA Canada	
FIFA 11	September 28, 2010	Windows	EA Canada	
FIFA 11	September 28, 2010	Xbox 360	EA Canada	
MySims SkyHeroes	September 28, 2010	Nintendo DS	Behaviour Interactive	
MySims SkyHeroes	September 28, 2010	PlayStation 3	Behaviour Interactive	
MySims SkyHeroes	September 28, 2010	Wii	Behaviour Interactive	
MySims SkyHeroes	September 28, 2010	Xbox 360	Behaviour Interactive	
NBA Jam	October 5, 2010	Wii	EA Canada	
NBA Jam	November 17, 2010	PlayStation 3	EA Canada	
NBA Jam	February 10, 2011	iOS	EA Canada	
NBA Jam	November 17, 2011	Xbox 360	EA Canada	
NBA Jam	December 14, 2011	Macintosh	EA Canada	
NBA Jam	March 15, 2012	Android	EA Canada	
NBA Jam	March 21, 2013	Windows Phone	EA Canada	
Dead Space Ignition	October 12, 2010	PlayStation 3	Visceral Games / Sumo Digital	
Dead Space Ignition	October 12, 2010	Xbox 360	Visceral Games / Sumo Digital	
Medal of Honor	October 12, 2010	PlayStation 3	Danger Close Games	
Medal of Honor	October 12, 2010	Windows	Danger Close Games	
Medal of Honor	October 12, 2010	Xbox 360	Danger Close Games	
Need for Speed: Undercover	October 15, 2010	Windows Mobile	EA Black Box	
EA Sports MMA	October 19, 2010	iOS	EA Tiburon	
EA Sports MMA	October 19, 2010	PlayStation 3	EA Tiburon	
EA Sports MMA	October 19, 2010	Xbox 360	EA Tiburon	
Reckless Racing	October 21, 2010	Android	EA Mobile	
Reckless Racing	October 21, 2010	iOS	EA Mobile	
Monopoly	October 21, 2010	Windows Phone	EA Mobile / Hasbro	
Tetris	October 21, 2010	Windows Phone	EA Mobile / Electronic Arts	
Tetris	December 22, 2010	PlayStation 3	EA Mobile / Electronic Arts	
Tetris	September 1, 2011	Android	EA Mobile / Electronic Arts	
The Sims 3	October 21, 2010	Windows Phone	EA Mobile	
The Sims 3	October 26, 2010	Nintendo DSi	Edge of Reality	
The Sims 3	October 26, 2010	PlayStation 3	Edge of Reality	
The Sims 3	October 26, 2010	Xbox 360	Edge of Reality	
The Sims 3	November 12, 2010	Wii	Edge of Reality	
The Sims 3	March 27, 2011	Nintendo 3DS	Edge of Reality	
Hasbro Family Game Night 3	October 26, 2010	PlayStation 3	EA Bright Light	
Hasbro Family Game Night 3	October 26, 2010	Wii	Virtuos	
Hasbro Family Game Night 3	October 26, 2010	Xbox 360	EA Bright Light	
Monopoly Streets	October 26, 2010	PlayStation 3	EA Salt Lake	
Monopoly Streets	October 26, 2010	Wii	EA Salt Lake	
Monopoly Streets	October 26, 2010	Xbox 360	EA Salt Lake	
Rock Band 3	October 26, 2010	Nintendo DS	Harmonix	
Rock Band 3	October 26, 2010	PlayStation 3	Harmonix	
Rock Band 3	October 26, 2010	Wii	Harmonix	
Rock Band 3	October 26, 2010	Xbox 360	Harmonix	
The Sims 3: Late Night	October 26, 2010	Macintosh	Maxis Redwood Shores	
The Sims 3: Late Night	October 26, 2010	Windows	Maxis Redwood Shores	
FIFA Manager 11	October 29, 2010	Windows	Bright Future	
Auditorium	November 2, 2010	PlayStation 3	Cipher Prime	
Auditorium	November 2, 2010	PlayStation Portable	Cipher Prime	
Auditorium	November 3, 2010	Xbox 360	Cipher Prime	
Auditorium	February 29, 2012	Macintosh	Cipher Prime	
Auditorium	February 29, 2012	Windows	Cipher Prime	
Clue: Secrets & Spies	November 4, 2010	iOS	Electronic Arts	
NBA Elite 11	November 5, 2010	iOS	EA Canada	
Texas Hold'em	November 11, 2010	Kindle Fire	TikGames	
Create	November 16, 2010	PlayStation 3	EA Bright Light	
Create	November 16, 2010	Wii	EA Bright Light	
Create	November 16, 2010	Windows	EA Bright Light	
Create	November 16, 2010	Xbox 360	EA Bright Light	
EA Sports Active 2	November 16, 2010	PlayStation 3	EA Canada	
EA Sports Active 2	November 16, 2010	Wii	EA Canada	
EA Sports Active 2	November 16, 2010	Xbox 360	EA Canada	
EA Sports Active NFL Training Camp	November 16, 2010	Wii	EA Canada	
Harry Potter and the Deathly Hallows – Part 1	November 16, 2010	Nintendo DS	EA Bright Light	
Harry Potter and the Deathly Hallows – Part 1	November 16, 2010	PlayStation 3	EA Bright Light	
Harry Potter and the Deathly Hallows – Part 1	November 16, 2010	Wii	EA Bright Light	
Harry Potter and the Deathly Hallows – Part 1	November 16, 2010	Windows	EA Bright Light	
Harry Potter and the Deathly Hallows – Part 1	November 16, 2010	Xbox 360	EA Bright Light	
Need for Speed: Hot Pursuit	November 16, 2010	Android	Criterion Games	
Need for Speed: Hot Pursuit	November 16, 2010	iOS	Criterion Games	
Need for Speed: Hot Pursuit	November 16, 2010	Java ME	Criterion Games	
Need for Speed: Hot Pursuit	November 16, 2010	PlayStation 3	Criterion Games	
Need for Speed: Hot Pursuit	November 16, 2010	Windows	Criterion Games	
Need for Speed: Hot Pursuit	November 16, 2010	Xbox 360	Criterion Games	
Need for Speed: Hot Pursuit	November 16, 2010	webOS	Criterion Games	
Need for Speed: Hot Pursuit	November 16, 2010	Wii	Criterion Games	
Need for Speed: Hot Pursuit	November 16, 2010	Windows Phone	Criterion Games	
High Caliber Hunting	November 17, 2010	iOS	Electronic Arts	
Heroes Lore III	November 24, 2010	iOS	Electronic Arts	
Pictureka!	November 25, 2010	iOS	Electronic Arts	
Need for Speed: Nitro-X	November 26, 2010	Nintendo DSi	Firebrand Games	
Rock Band Reloaded	December 2, 2010	iOS	Harmonix	
Pogo Games	December 9, 2010	iOS	Electronic Arts	
Pogo Games	April 10, 2012	iOS	Electronic Arts	
RISK	December 14, 2010	iOS	Electronic Arts	
Cause of Death	December 16, 2010–July 18, 2014	iOS	Centerscore / EA Mobile	
Real Racing 2	December 16, 2010	iOS	Firemint	
Real Racing 2	December 22, 2011	Android	Firemint	
Real Racing 2	May 22, 2013	Windows Phone	Firemint	
Ultimate Mortal Kombat 3	December 16, 2010	iOS	Electronic Arts	
NBA Street Online 2	2010	Windows	Electronic Arts / Neowiz	
Spare Parts	January 18, 2011	PlayStation 3	EA Bright Light	
Spare Parts	January 19, 2011	Xbox 360	EA Bright Light	
Dead Space	January 25, 2011	iOS	IronMonkey Studios	
Dead Space	August 18, 2011	Blackberry	IronMonkey Studios	
Dead Space	November 1, 2011	Xperia Play	IronMonkey Studios	
Dead Space	December 16, 2011	Android	IronMonkey Studios	
Dead Space 2	January 25, 2011	PlayStation 3	Visceral Games	
Dead Space 2	January 25, 2011	Windows	Visceral Games	
Dead Space 2	January 25, 2011	Xbox 360	Visceral Games	
Dead Space: Extraction	January 25, 2011	PlayStation 3	Visceral Games / Eurocom	
Bejeweled 2	February 19, 2011	Android	PopCap Games	
Bulletstorm	February 22, 2011	PlayStation 3	People Can Fly / Epic Games	
Bulletstorm	February 22, 2011	Windows	People Can Fly / Epic Games	
Bulletstorm	February 22, 2011	Xbox 360	People Can Fly / Epic Games	
Zuma's Revenge!	February 22, 2011	Nintendo DS	PopCap Games	
Zuma's Revenge!	March 13, 2012	iOS	PopCap Games	
Zuma's Revenge!	July 11, 2012	Xbox Live Arcade	PopCap Games	
Rango	February 25, 2011	Nintendo DS	Behaviour Interactive	
Rango	February 25, 2011	PlayStation 3	Behaviour Interactive	
Rango	February 25, 2011	Wii	Behaviour Interactive	
Rango	February 25, 2011	Xbox 360	Behaviour Interactive	
Fight Night Champion	March 1, 2011	iOS	HB Studios	
Fight Night Champion	March 1, 2011	PlayStation 3	EA Canada	
Fight Night Champion	March 1, 2011	Xbox 360	EA Canada	
Dragon Age II	March 8, 2011	Macintosh	BioWare	
Dragon Age II	March 8, 2011	PlayStation 3	BioWare	
Dragon Age II	March 8, 2011	Windows	BioWare	
Dragon Age II	March 8, 2011	Xbox 360	BioWare	
Dragon Age Legends	March 18, 2011	Facebook	Electronic Arts / Pixelante	
Crysis 2	March 22, 2011	PlayStation 3	Crytek	
Crysis 2	March 22, 2011	Windows	Crytek	
Crysis 2	March 22, 2011	Xbox 360	Crytek	
Madden NFL Football	March 22, 2011	Nintendo 3DS	EA Sports	
Shift 2: Unleashed	March 29, 2011	PlayStation 3	Slightly Mad Studios	
Shift 2: Unleashed	March 29, 2011	Windows	Slightly Mad Studios	
Shift 2: Unleashed	March 29, 2011	Xbox 360	Slightly Mad Studios	
Shift 2: Unleashed	August 4, 2011	iOS	Straight Right	
Tiger Woods PGA Tour 12	March 29, 2011	iOS	EA Tiburon	
Tiger Woods PGA Tour 12	March 29, 2011	PlayStation 3	EA Tiburon	
Tiger Woods PGA Tour 12	March 29, 2011	Wii	EA Tiburon	
Tiger Woods PGA Tour 12	March 29, 2011	Xbox 360	EA Tiburon	
Tiger Woods PGA Tour 12	September 6, 2011	Macintosh	EA Tiburon	
Tiger Woods PGA Tour 12	September 6, 2011	Windows	EA Tiburon	
Darkspore	April 26, 2011	Windows	Maxis Emeryville	
The Sims 3: Generations	May 31, 2011	Macintosh	Maxis Redwood Shores	
The Sims 3: Generations	May 31, 2011	Windows	Maxis Redwood Shores	
Ultima Underworld: The Stygian Abyss and Labyrinth of Worlds	June 2, 2011	DOS	Blue Sky Productions / LookingGlass Technologies / Origin Systems	
American McGee's Alice	June 14, 2011	PlayStation 3	Rogue Entertainment	
American McGee's Alice	June 14, 2011	Xbox 360	Rogue Entertainment	
Alice: Madness Returns	June 14, 2011	iOS	Spicy Horse	
Alice: Madness Returns	June 14, 2011	PlayStation 3	Spicy Horse	
Alice: Madness Returns	June 14, 2011	Windows	Spicy Horse	
Alice: Madness Returns	June 14, 2011	Xbox 360	Spicy Horse	
Alice: Madness Returns	January 27, 2017	Xbox One	Spicy Horse	
Plants vs. Zombies	June 22, 2011	Windows Phone	PopCap Games	
Plants vs. Zombies	December 14, 2011	Android	PopCap Games	
Plants vs. Zombies	February 22, 2012	PlayStation Vita	PopCap Games	
Plants vs. Zombies	January 30, 2013	BlackBerry	PopCap Games	
Harry Potter and the Deathly Hallows – Part 2	July 12, 2011	Nintendo DS	EA Bright Light	
Harry Potter and the Deathly Hallows – Part 2	July 12, 2011	PlayStation 3	EA Bright Light	
Harry Potter and the Deathly Hallows – Part 2	July 12, 2011	Wii	EA Bright Light	
Harry Potter and the Deathly Hallows – Part 2	July 12, 2011	Windows	EA Bright Light	
Harry Potter and the Deathly Hallows – Part 2	July 12, 2011	Xbox 360	EA Bright Light	
NCAA Football 12	July 12, 2011	iOS	EA Tiburon	
NCAA Football 12	July 12, 2011	PlayStation 3	EA Tiburon	
NCAA Football 12	July 12, 2011	Xbox 360	EA Tiburon	
Pet Society Vacation	July 22, 2011	iOS	Playfish	
The Sims Social	August 9, 2011	Facebook	Playfish	
Medal of Honor: Frontline	August 16, 2011	PlayStation Network	EA Los Angeles	
Spy Mouse	August 25, 2011	Android	Firemint	
Spy Mouse	August 25, 2011	iOS	Firemint	
Madden NFL 12	August 30, 2011	Android	EA Tiburon	
Madden NFL 12	August 30, 2011	BlackBerry PlayBook	EA Tiburon	
Madden NFL 12	August 30, 2011	iOS	EA Tiburon	
Madden NFL 12	August 30, 2011	PlayStation 2	EA Tiburon	
Madden NFL 12	August 30, 2011	PlayStation 3	EA Tiburon	
Madden NFL 12	August 30, 2011	PlayStation Portable	EA Tiburon	
Madden NFL 12	August 30, 2011	Wii	EA Tiburon	
Madden NFL 12	August 30, 2011	Xbox 360	EA Tiburon	
The Sims Medieval: Pirates and Nobles	August 30, 2011	Macintosh	Maxis Redwood Shores	
The Sims Medieval: Pirates and Nobles	August 30, 2011	Windows	Maxis Redwood Shores	
NHL 12	September 9, 2011	PlayStation 3	EA Canada	
NHL 12	September 9, 2011	Xbox 360	EA Canada	
Burnout Crash!	September 20, 2011	PlayStation Network	Criterion Games	
Burnout Crash!	September 20, 2011	Xbox Live Arcade	Criterion Games	
Burnout Crash!	April 15, 2012	iOS	Criterion Games	
Shadows of the Damned	September 22, 2011	PlayStation 3	Grasshopper Manufacture	
Shadows of the Damned	September 22, 2011	Xbox 360	Grasshopper Manufacture	
The Sims Medieval	September 22, 2011	iOS	Magic Pockets	
The Sims Medieval	September 22, 2011	Macintosh	Maxis Redwood Shores	
The Sims Medieval	September 22, 2011	Windows	Maxis Redwood Shores	
The Sims Medieval	March 25, 2013	Windows Phone	Maxis Redwood Shores	
FIFA 12	September 27, 2011	Android	EA Canada	
FIFA 12	September 27, 2011	iOS	EA Canada	
FIFA 12	September 27, 2011	Macintosh	EA Canada	
FIFA 12	September 27, 2011	Nintendo DS	EA Canada	
FIFA 12	September 27, 2011	PlayStation 2	EA Canada	
FIFA 12	September 27, 2011	PlayStation 3	EA Canada	
FIFA 12	September 27, 2011	PlayStation Portable	EA Canada	
FIFA 12	September 27, 2011	PlayStation Vita	EA Canada	
FIFA 12	September 27, 2011	Sony Ericsson Xperia Play	EA Canada	
FIFA 12	September 27, 2011	Wii	EA Canada	
FIFA 12	September 27, 2011	Windows	EA Canada	
FIFA 12	September 27, 2011	Xbox 360	EA Canada	
Crysis	October 4, 2011	PlayStation 3	Crytek	
Crysis	October 4, 2011	Xbox 360	Crytek	
NBA Jam: On Fire Edition	October 4, 2011	PlayStation 3	EA Canada	
NBA Jam: On Fire Edition	October 5, 2011	Xbox 360	EA Canada	
NHL Superstars	October 2011	Facebook	Electronic Arts	
The Sims 3: Pets	October 18, 2011	Nintendo 3DS	EA Salt Lake	
The Sims 3: Pets	October 18, 2011	Macintosh	Maxis Redwood Shores	
The Sims 3: Pets	October 18, 2011	PlayStation 3	Edge of Reality	
The Sims 3: Pets	October 18, 2011	Windows	Maxis Redwood Shores	
The Sims 3: Pets	October 18, 2011	Xbox 360	Edge of Reality	
FIFA Manager 12	October 21, 2011	Windows	Bright Future	
Battlefield 3	October 25, 2011	PlayStation 3	EA DICE	
Battlefield 3	October 25, 2011	Windows	EA DICE	
Battlefield 3	October 25, 2011	Xbox 360	EA DICE	
Hasbro Family Game Night 4: The Game Show	November 1, 2011	PlayStation 3	EA Bright Light	
Hasbro Family Game Night 4: The Game Show	November 1, 2011	Wii	Virtuos	
Hasbro Family Game Night 4: The Game Show	November 1, 2011	Xbox 360	EA Bright Light	
Fantasy Safari	November 3, 2011	iOS	Electronic Arts	
Scrabble	November 12, 2011	Android	EA Mobile	
Need for Speed: The Run	November 15, 2011	Nintendo 3DS	Firebrand Games	
Need for Speed: The Run	November 15, 2011	PlayStation 3	EA Black Box	
Need for Speed: The Run	November 15, 2011	Wii	Firebrand Games	
Need for Speed: The Run	November 15, 2011	Windows	EA Black Box	
Need for Speed: The Run	November 15, 2011	Windows Mobile	EA Black Box	
Need for Speed: The Run	November 15, 2011	Xbox 360	EA Black Box	
Theme Park	December 8, 2011	iOS	Bullfrog Productions	
Trenches 2	December 15, 2011	iOS	Thunder Game Works	
Bejeweled Blitz	December 16, 2011	iOS	PopCap Games	
Bejeweled Blitz	May 2, 2013	Android	PopCap Games	
Star Wars: The Old Republic	December 20, 2011	Windows	BioWare Austin	
The Sims FreePlay	December 15, 2011	iOS	EA Mobile / Firemonkeys Studios / Blue Tongue Entertainment	
The Sims FreePlay	February 15, 2012	Android	EA Mobile / Firemonkeys Studios / Blue Tongue Entertainment	
The Sims FreePlay	July 31, 2013	BlackBerry	EA Mobile / Firemonkeys Studios / Blue Tongue Entertainment	
The Sims FreePlay	September 12, 2013	Windows Phone	EA Mobile / Firemonkeys Studios / Blue Tongue Entertainment	
NFL Blitz	January 4, 2012	PlayStation Network	EA Tiburon	
NFL Blitz	January 4, 2012	Xbox Live Arcade	EA Tiburon	
Kingdoms of Amalur: Reckoning	February 7, 2012	PlayStation 3	38 Studios / Big Huge Games	
Kingdoms of Amalur: Reckoning	February 7, 2012	Windows	38 Studios / Big Huge Games	
Kingdoms of Amalur: Reckoning	February 7, 2012	Xbox 360	38 Studios / Big Huge Games	
Shank 2	February 7, 2012	PlayStation 3	Klei Entertainment	
Shank 2	February 7, 2012	Windows	Klei Entertainment	
Shank 2	February 8, 2012	Xbox 360	Klei Entertainment	
Shank 2	December 19, 2012	Linux	Klei Entertainment	
Shank 2	December 19, 2012	Macintosh	Klei Entertainment	
Grand Slam Tennis 2	February 10, 2012	PlayStation 3	EA Canada	
Grand Slam Tennis 2	February 10, 2012	Xbox 360	EA Canada	
Warp	February 15, 2012	Xbox 360	Trapdoor	
Warp	March 13, 2012	PlayStation 3	Trapdoor	
Warp	March 13, 2012	Windows	Trapdoor	
Syndicate	February 21, 2012	PlayStation 3	Starbreeze Studios	
Syndicate	February 21, 2012	Windows	Starbreeze Studios	
Syndicate	February 21, 2012	Xbox 360	Starbreeze Studios	
SSX	February 28, 2012	PlayStation 3	EA Canada	
SSX	February 28, 2012	Xbox 360	EA Canada	
The Simpsons: Tapped Out	February 29, 2012	iOS	EA Mobile	
The Simpsons: Tapped Out	February 6, 2013	Android	EA Mobile	
The Simpsons: Tapped Out	June 24, 2013	Kindle Fire	EA Mobile	
Mass Effect 3	March 6, 2012	PlayStation 3	BioWare	
Mass Effect 3	March 6, 2012	Windows	BioWare	
Mass Effect 3	March 6, 2012	Xbox 360	BioWare	
Mass Effect 3	November 18, 2012	Wii U	BioWare	
Mass Effect Infiltrator	March 6, 2012	iOS	IronMonkey Studios	
Mass Effect Infiltrator	May 22, 2012	Android	IronMonkey Studios	
Mass Effect Infiltrator	May 28, 2013	Windows Phone	IronMonkey Studios	
Mass Effect Infiltrator	June 13, 2013	BlackBerry	IronMonkey Studios	
The Sims 3: Showtime	March 6, 2012	Macintosh	EA Salt Lake	
The Sims 3: Showtime	March 6, 2012	Windows	EA Salt Lake	
FIFA Street	March 13, 2012	PlayStation 3	EA Canada	
FIFA Street	March 13, 2012	Xbox 360	EA Canada	
Flight Control Rocket	March 15, 2012	iOS	Firemint	
Tiger Woods PGA Tour 13	March 27, 2012	PlayStation 3	EA Tiburon	
Tiger Woods PGA Tour 13	March 27, 2012	Xbox 360	EA Tiburon	
UEFA Euro 2012	April 24, 2012	PlayStation 3	EA Canada	
UEFA Euro 2012	April 24, 2012	Windows	EA Canada	
UEFA Euro 2012	April 24, 2012	Xbox 360	EA Canada	
Bejeweled Classic HD	May 17, 2012	iOS	PopCap Games	
Command & Conquer: Tiberium Alliances	May 24, 2012	Windows	EA Phenomic	
NCAA Football 13	July 10, 2012	PlayStation 3	EA Tiburon	
NCAA Football 13	July 10, 2012	Xbox 360	EA Tiburon	
SimCity Social	June 25, 2012	Facebook	Playfish	
The Secret World	July 3, 2012	Windows	Funcom	
World Series of Poker	July 10, 2012	iOS	Left Field Productions	
Outernauts	July 24, 2012	Facebook	Insomniac Games	
Outernauts	July 24, 2012	iOS	Insomniac Games	
Madden NFL 13	August 28, 2012	PlayStation 3	EA Tiburon	
Madden NFL 13	August 28, 2012	PlayStation Vita	EA Tiburon	
Madden NFL 13	August 28, 2012	Wii	EA Tiburon	
Madden NFL 13	August 28, 2012	Xbox 360	EA Tiburon	
Madden NFL 13	November 1, 2012	iOS	EA Tiburon	
Madden NFL 13	November 18, 2012	Wii U	EA Tiburon	
Madden NFL Social	August 29, 2012	Facebook	Electronic Arts	
Madden NFL Social	August 29, 2012	iOS	Electronic Arts	
NHL 13	September 11, 2012	PlayStation 3	EA Canada	
NHL 13	September 11, 2012	Xbox 360	EA Canada	
The Sims 3: Supernatural	September 4, 2012	Macintosh	EA Salt Lake	
The Sims 3: Supernatural	September 4, 2012	Windows	EA Salt Lake	
JetSet Secrets	September 24, 2012	Facebook	Electronic Arts	
FIFA 13	September 25, 2012	iOS	EA Canada	
FIFA 13	September 25, 2012	Java ME	EA Canada	
FIFA 13	September 25, 2012	Nintendo 3DS	EA Canada	
FIFA 13	September 25, 2012	PlayStation 2	EA Canada	
FIFA 13	September 25, 2012	PlayStation 3	EA Canada	
FIFA 13	September 25, 2012	PlayStation Portable	EA Canada	
FIFA 13	September 25, 2012	PlayStation Vita	EA Canada	
FIFA 13	September 25, 2012	Wii	EA Canada	
FIFA 13	September 25, 2012	Windows	EA Canada	
FIFA 13	September 25, 2012	Xbox 360	EA Canada	
FIFA 13	November 18, 2012	Wii U	EA Canada	
FIFA 13	July 8, 2013	Windows Phone 8	EA Canada	
Medal of Honor: Warfighter	October 23, 2012	PlayStation 3	Danger Close Games	
Medal of Honor: Warfighter	October 23, 2012	Windows	Danger Close Games	
Medal of Honor: Warfighter	October 23, 2012	Xbox 360	Danger Close Games	
FIFA Manager 13	October 26, 2012	Windows	Bright Future	
Need for Speed: Most Wanted	October 30, 2012	Android	Criterion Games	
Need for Speed: Most Wanted	October 30, 2012	iOS	Criterion Games	
Need for Speed: Most Wanted	October 30, 2012	Kindle Fire	Criterion Games	
Need for Speed: Most Wanted	October 30, 2012	PlayStation 3	Criterion Games	
Need for Speed: Most Wanted	October 30, 2012	PlayStation Vita	Criterion Games	
Need for Speed: Most Wanted	October 30, 2012	Windows	Criterion Games	
Need for Speed: Most Wanted	October 30, 2012	Xbox 360	Criterion Games	
Need for Speed: Most Wanted	March 19, 2013	Wii U	Criterion Games	
The Sims 3: Seasons	November 13, 2012	Macintosh	Maxis Redwood Shores	
The Sims 3: Seasons	November 13, 2012	Windows	Maxis Redwood Shores	
FIFA Online 3	December 18, 2012	Windows	Electronic Arts / EA Spearhead	
Dead Space 3	February 5, 2013	PlayStation 3	Visceral Games	
Dead Space 3	February 5, 2013	Windows	Visceral Games	
Dead Space 3	February 5, 2013	Xbox 360	Visceral Games	
Crysis 3	February 19, 2013	PlayStation 3	Crytek	
Crysis 3	February 19, 2013	Windows	Crytek	
Crysis 3	February 19, 2013	Xbox 360	Crytek	
Real Racing 3	February 28, 2013	Android	Firemonkeys Studios	
Real Racing 3	February 28, 2013	iOS	Firemonkeys Studios	
Real Racing 3	August 28, 2013	BlackBerry	Firemonkeys Studios	
The Sims 3: University Life	March 5, 2013	Macintosh	EA Salt Lake	
The Sims 3: University Life	March 5, 2013	Windows	EA Salt Lake	
SimCity	March 6, 2013	Windows	Maxis Emeryville	
SimCity	August 29, 2013	Macintosh	Maxis Emeryville	
Army of Two: The Devil's Cartel	March 26, 2013	PlayStation 3	Visceral Games / EA Montreal	
Army of Two: The Devil's Cartel	March 26, 2013	Xbox 360	Visceral Games / EA Montreal	
Tiger Woods PGA Tour 14	March 26, 2013	PlayStation 3	EA Tiburon	
Tiger Woods PGA Tour 14	March 26, 2013	Xbox 360	EA Tiburon	
Fuse	May 28, 2013	PlayStation 3	Insomniac Games	
Fuse	May 28, 2013	Xbox 360	Insomniac Games	
The Sims 3: Island Paradise	June 25, 2013	Macintosh	Maxis Redwood Shores	
The Sims 3: Island Paradise	June 25, 2013	Windows	Maxis Redwood Shores	
NCAA Football 14	July 9, 2013	PlayStation 3	EA Tiburon	
NCAA Football 14	July 9, 2013	Xbox 360	EA Tiburon	
Iron Force	July 24, 2013	Android	CoolFish Games	
Iron Force	July 24, 2013	iOS	CoolFish Games	
Ultima Forever: Quest for the Avatar	August 7, 2013	iOS	Mythic Entertainment / Escalation Studios	
Madden NFL 25	August 27, 2013	iOS	EA Tiburon	
Madden NFL 25	August 27, 2013	PlayStation 3	EA Tiburon	
Madden NFL 25	August 27, 2013	Xbox 360	EA Tiburon	
Madden NFL 25	November 15, 2013	PlayStation 4	EA Tiburon	
Madden NFL 25	November 22, 2013	Xbox One	EA Tiburon	
Madden NFL 25	December 23, 2013	Android	EA Tiburon	
NHL 14	September 10, 2013	PlayStation 3	EA Canada	
NHL 14	September 10, 2013	Xbox 360	EA Canada	
FIFA 14	September 23, 2013	Android	EA Canada	
FIFA 14	September 23, 2013	iOS	EA Canada	
FIFA 14	September 23, 2013	Java ME	EA Canada	
FIFA 14	September 24, 2013	Nintendo 3DS	EA Canada	
FIFA 14	September 24, 2013	PlayStation 2	EA Canada	
FIFA 14	September 24, 2013	PlayStation 3	EA Canada	
FIFA 14	September 24, 2013	PlayStation Portable	EA Canada	
FIFA 14	September 24, 2013	PlayStation Vita	EA Canada	
FIFA 14	September 24, 2013	Wii	EA Canada	
FIFA 14	September 24, 2013	Windows	EA Canada	
FIFA 14	September 24, 2013	Xbox 360	EA Canada	
FIFA 14	November 12, 2013	PlayStation 4	EA Canada	
FIFA 14	November 19, 2013	Xbox One	EA Canada	
FIFA 14	February 28, 2014	Windows Phone	EA Canada	
Yogify	October 7, 2013	iOS	Electronic Arts	
The Sims 3: Into the Future	October 22, 2013	Macintosh	EA Salt Lake	
The Sims 3: Into the Future	October 22, 2013	Windows	EA Salt Lake	
Plants vs. Zombies 2: It's About Time	October 23, 2013	Android	PopCap Games	
Plants vs. Zombies 2: It's About Time	August 15, 2013	iOS	PopCap Games	
Battlefield 4	October 29, 2013	PlayStation 3	EA DICE	
Battlefield 4	October 29, 2013	Windows	EA DICE	
Battlefield 4	October 29, 2013	Xbox 360	EA DICE	
Battlefield 4	November 15, 2013	PlayStation 4	EA DICE	
Battlefield 4	November 22, 2013	Xbox One	EA DICE	
FIFA Manager 14	October 25, 2013	Windows	Bright Future	
FIFA World	November 12, 2013	Windows	EA Canada	
Need for Speed Rivals	November 15, 2013	PlayStation 4	Ghost Games / Criterion Games	
Need for Speed Rivals	November 19, 2013	PlayStation 3	Ghost Games / Criterion Games	
Need for Speed Rivals	November 19, 2013	Windows	Ghost Games / Criterion Games	
Need for Speed Rivals	November 19, 2013	Xbox 360	Ghost Games / Criterion Games	
Need for Speed Rivals	November 22, 2013	Xbox One	Ghost Games / Criterion Games	
NBA Live 14	November 19, 2013	PlayStation 4	EA Tiburon	
NBA Live 14	November 19, 2013	Xbox One	EA Tiburon	
Heroes of Dragon Age	December 5, 2013	Android	Electronic Arts	
Heroes of Dragon Age	December 5, 2013	iOS	Electronic Arts	
Peggle 2	December 9, 2013	Xbox One	PopCap Games	
Peggle 2	May 7, 2014	Xbox 360	PopCap Games	
Peggle 2	October 14, 2014	PlayStation 4	PopCap Games	
Fightback	December 17, 2013	iOS	Ninja Theory	
Dungeon Keeper Mobile	January 30, 2014	Android	Mythic Entertainment	
Dungeon Keeper Mobile	January 30, 2014	iOS	Mythic Entertainment	
Plants vs. Zombies: Garden Warfare	February 25, 2014	Xbox 360	PopCap Games	
Plants vs. Zombies: Garden Warfare	February 25, 2014	Xbox One	PopCap Games	
Plants vs. Zombies: Garden Warfare	June 24, 2014	Windows	PopCap Games	
Plants vs. Zombies: Garden Warfare	August 19, 2014	PlayStation 3	PopCap Games	
Plants vs. Zombies: Garden Warfare	August 19, 2014	PlayStation 4	PopCap Games	
Titanfall	March 11, 2014	Windows	Respawn Entertainment	
Titanfall	March 11, 2014	Xbox 360	Respawn Entertainment	
Titanfall	March 11, 2014	Xbox One	Respawn Entertainment	
2014 FIFA World Cup Brazil	April 15, 2014	PlayStation 3	EA Canada	
2014 FIFA World Cup Brazil	April 15, 2014	Xbox 360	EA Canada	
EA Sports UFC	June 17, 2014	PlayStation 4	EA Canada / SkyBox Labs	
EA Sports UFC	June 17, 2014	Xbox One	EA Canada / SkyBox Labs	
Madden NFL 15	August 26, 2014	PlayStation 3	EA Tiburon	
Madden NFL 15	August 26, 2014	PlayStation 4	EA Tiburon	
Madden NFL 15	August 26, 2014	Xbox 360	EA Tiburon	
Madden NFL 15	August 26, 2014	Xbox One	EA Tiburon	
Madden NFL Mobile	August 26, 2014	Android	EA Tiburon	
Madden NFL Mobile	August 26, 2014	iOS	EA Tiburon	
The Sims 4	September 2, 2014	Windows	Maxis	
The Sims 4	February 17, 2015	Macintosh	Maxis	
The Sims 4	November 14, 2017	PlayStation 4	Maxis	
The Sims 4	November 14, 2017	Xbox One	Maxis	
NHL 15	September 9, 2014	PlayStation 3	EA Canada	
NHL 15	September 9, 2014	PlayStation 4	EA Canada	
NHL 15	September 9, 2014	Xbox 360	EA Canada	
NHL 15	September 9, 2014	Xbox One	EA Canada	
Bejeweled 3	September 17, 2014	Windows	PopCap Games	
FIFA 15	September 23, 2014	Android	EA Canada	
FIFA 15	September 23, 2014	iOS	EA Canada	
FIFA 15	September 23, 2014	Nintendo 3DS	EA Canada	
FIFA 15	September 23, 2014	PlayStation 3	EA Canada	
FIFA 15	September 23, 2014	PlayStation 4	EA Canada	
FIFA 15	September 23, 2014	PlayStation Vita	EA Canada	
FIFA 15	September 23, 2014	Wii	EA Canada	
FIFA 15	September 23, 2014	Windows	EA Canada	
FIFA 15	September 23, 2014	Xbox 360	EA Canada	
FIFA 15	September 23, 2014	Xbox One	EA Canada	
FIFA 15	September 23, 2014	Windows Phone	EA Canada	
SimCity: BuildIt	October 22, 2014	Android	TrackTwenty	
SimCity: BuildIt	October 24, 2014	iOS	TrackTwenty	
NBA Live 15	October 28, 2014	PlayStation 4	EA Tiburon	
NBA Live 15	October 28, 2014	Xbox One	EA Tiburon	
Dragon Age: Inquisition	November 18, 2014	PlayStation 3	BioWare	
Dragon Age: Inquisition	November 18, 2014	PlayStation 4	BioWare	
Dragon Age: Inquisition	November 18, 2014	Windows	BioWare	
Dragon Age: Inquisition	November 18, 2014	Xbox 360	BioWare	
Dragon Age: Inquisition	November 18, 2014	Xbox One	BioWare	
Peggle Blast	December 2, 2014	Android	PopCap Games	
Peggle Blast	December 2, 2014	iOS	PopCap Games	
The Sims 4: Outdoor Retreat	January 13, 2015	Macintosh	Maxis Redwood Shores	
The Sims 4: Outdoor Retreat	January 13, 2015	Windows	Maxis Redwood Shores	
The Sims 4: Outdoor Retreat	December 4, 2018	PlayStation 4	Maxis Redwood Shores	
The Sims 4: Outdoor Retreat	December 4, 2018	Xbox One	Maxis Redwood Shores	
Battlefield Hardline	March 17, 2015	PlayStation 3	Visceral Games	
Battlefield Hardline	March 17, 2015	PlayStation 4	Visceral Games	
Battlefield Hardline	March 17, 2015	Windows	Visceral Games	
Battlefield Hardline	March 17, 2015	Xbox 360	Visceral Games	
Battlefield Hardline	March 17, 2015	Xbox One	Visceral Games	
The Sims 4: Get to Work	March 31, 2015	Macintosh	Maxis Redwood Shores	
The Sims 4: Get to Work	March 31, 2015	Windows	Maxis Redwood Shores	
The Sims 4: Get to Work	March 20, 2018	PlayStation 4	Maxis Redwood Shores	
The Sims 4: Get to Work	March 20, 2018	Xbox One	Maxis Redwood Shores	
UFC Mobile	April 21, 2015	Android	EA Canada / SkyBox Labs	
UFC Mobile	April 21, 2015	iOS	EA Canada / SkyBox Labs	
The Sims 4 Stuff packs	May 19, 2015–February 4, 2020	Macintosh	Maxis Redwood Shores	
The Sims 4 Stuff packs	May 19, 2015–February 4, 2020	PlayStation 4	Maxis Redwood Shores	
The Sims 4 Stuff packs	May 19, 2015–February 4, 2020	Windows	Maxis Redwood Shores	
The Sims 4 Stuff packs	May 19, 2015–February 4, 2020	Xbox One	Maxis Redwood Shores	
Rory McIlroy PGA Tour	July 14, 2015	PlayStation 4	EA Tiburon	
Rory McIlroy PGA Tour	July 14, 2015	Xbox One	EA Tiburon	
Madden NFL 16	August 25, 2015	PlayStation 3	EA Tiburon	
Madden NFL 16	August 25, 2015	PlayStation 4	EA Tiburon	
Madden NFL 16	August 25, 2015	Xbox 360	EA Tiburon	
Madden NFL 16	August 25, 2015	Xbox One	EA Tiburon	
NHL 16	September 15, 2015	PlayStation 3	EA Canada	
NHL 16	September 15, 2015	PlayStation 4	EA Canada	
NHL 16	September 15, 2015	Xbox 360	EA Canada	
NHL 16	September 15, 2015	Xbox One	EA Canada	
FIFA 16	September 22, 2015	Android	EA Canada	
FIFA 16	September 22, 2015	iOS	EA Canada	
FIFA 16	September 22, 2015	PlayStation 3	EA Canada	
FIFA 16	September 22, 2015	PlayStation 4	EA Canada	
FIFA 16	September 22, 2015	Windows	EA Canada	
FIFA 16	September 22, 2015	Xbox 360	EA Canada	
FIFA 16	September 22, 2015	Xbox One	EA Canada	
NBA Live 16	September 29, 2015	PlayStation 4	EA Tiburon	
NBA Live 16	September 29, 2015	Xbox One	EA Tiburon	
Need for Speed: No Limits	September 30, 2015	Android	Firemonkeys Studios	
Need for Speed: No Limits	September 30, 2015	iOS	Firemonkeys Studios	
Minions Paradise	October 13, 2015	Android	EA Salt Lake	
Minions Paradise	October 13, 2015	iOS	EA Salt Lake	
Need for Speed	November 3, 2015	PlayStation 4	Ghost Games	
Need for Speed	November 3, 2015	Xbox One	Ghost Games	
Need for Speed	March 15, 2016	Windows	Ghost Games	
Star Wars Battlefront	November 17, 2015	PlayStation 4	EA DICE	
Star Wars Battlefront	November 17, 2015	Windows	EA DICE	
Star Wars Battlefront	November 17, 2015	Xbox One	EA DICE	
Battle Copters	November 19, 2015	Android	EA Chillingo	
Battle Copters	November 19, 2015	iOS	EA Chillingo	
Star Wars: Galaxy of Heroes	November 24, 2015	Android	EA Capital Games / EA Mobile	
Star Wars: Galaxy of Heroes	November 24, 2015	iOS	EA Capital Games / EA Mobile	
The Sims 4: Get Together	December 8, 2015	Macintosh	Maxis Redwood Shores	
The Sims 4: Get Together	December 8, 2015	Windows	Maxis Redwood Shores	
The Sims 4: Get Together	September 11, 2018	PlayStation 4	Maxis Redwood Shores	
The Sims 4: Get Together	September 11, 2018	Xbox One	Maxis Redwood Shores	
Unravel	February 9, 2016	PlayStation 4	Coldwood Interactive	
Unravel	February 9, 2016	Windows	Coldwood Interactive	
Unravel	February 9, 2016	Xbox One	Coldwood Interactive	
Plants vs. Zombies: Garden Warfare 2	February 23, 2016	PlayStation 4	PopCap Games	
Plants vs. Zombies: Garden Warfare 2	February 23, 2016	Windows	PopCap Games	
Plants vs. Zombies: Garden Warfare 2	February 23, 2016	Xbox One	PopCap Games	
EA Sports UFC 2	March 15, 2016	PlayStation 4	EA Canada	
EA Sports UFC 2	March 15, 2016	Xbox One	EA Canada	
Bejeweled Stars	May 10, 2016	Android	PopCap Games	
Bejeweled Stars	May 10, 2016	iOS	PopCap Games	
Mirror's Edge Catalyst	June 7, 2016	PlayStation 4	EA DICE	
Mirror's Edge Catalyst	June 7, 2016	Windows	EA DICE	
Mirror's Edge Catalyst	June 7, 2016	Xbox One	EA DICE	
The Sims 4: Dine Out	June 7, 2016	Macintosh	Maxis Redwood Shores	
The Sims 4: Dine Out	June 7, 2016	Windows	Maxis Redwood Shores	
The Sims 4: Dine Out	January 8, 2018	PlayStation 4	Maxis Redwood Shores	
The Sims 4: Dine Out	January 8, 2018	Xbox One	Maxis Redwood Shores	
The Secret Life of Pets Unleashed	June 21, 2016	Android	EA Mobile	
The Secret Life of Pets Unleashed	June 21, 2016	iOS	EA Mobile	
NBA Live Mobile	July 6, 2016	Android	EA Tiburon	
NBA Live Mobile	July 6, 2016	iOS	EA Tiburon	
Micro Machines	July 18, 2016	iOS	Codemasters	
Micro Machines	September 27, 2016	Android	Codemasters	
Madden NFL 17	August 23, 2016	PlayStation 3	EA Tiburon	
Madden NFL 17	August 23, 2016	PlayStation 4	EA Tiburon	
Madden NFL 17	August 23, 2016	Xbox 360	EA Tiburon	
Madden NFL 17	August 23, 2016	Xbox One	EA Tiburon	
NHL 17	September 13, 2016	PlayStation 4	EA Canada	
NHL 17	September 13, 2016	Xbox One	EA Canada	
FIFA 17	September 27, 2016	PlayStation 3	EA Vancouver / EA Bucharest	
FIFA 17	September 27, 2016	PlayStation 4	EA Vancouver / EA Bucharest	
FIFA 17	September 27, 2016	Windows	EA Vancouver / EA Bucharest	
FIFA 17	September 27, 2016	Xbox 360	EA Vancouver / EA Bucharest	
FIFA 17	September 27, 2016	Xbox One	EA Vancouver / EA Bucharest	
FIFA Mobile	October 11, 2016	Android	EA Mobile / EA Canada	
FIFA Mobile	October 11, 2016	iOS	EA Mobile / EA Canada	
FIFA Mobile	October 11, 2016	Windows	EA Mobile / EA Canada	
Plants vs. Zombies Heroes	October 18, 2016	iOS	PopCap Games	
Plants vs. Zombies Heroes	October 18, 2016	Android	PopCap Games	
Battlefield 1	October 21, 2016	PlayStation 4	EA DICE	
Battlefield 1	October 21, 2016	Windows	EA DICE	
Battlefield 1	October 21, 2016	Xbox One	EA DICE	
Titanfall 2	October 28, 2016	PlayStation 4	Respawn Entertainment	
Titanfall 2	October 28, 2016	Windows	Respawn Entertainment	
Titanfall 2	October 28, 2016	Xbox One	Respawn Entertainment	
The Sims 4: City Living	November 1, 2016	Macintosh	Maxis Redwood Shores	
The Sims 4: City Living	November 1, 2016	Windows	Maxis Redwood Shores	
The Sims 4: City Living	November 14, 2017	PlayStation 4	Maxis Redwood Shores	
The Sims 4: City Living	November 14, 2017	Xbox One	Maxis Redwood Shores	
WarFriends	January 17, 2017	Android	About Fun	
WarFriends	January 17, 2017	iOS	About Fun	
The Sims 4: Vampires	January 24, 2017	Macintosh	Maxis Redwood Shores	
The Sims 4: Vampires	January 24, 2017	Windows	Maxis Redwood Shores	
The Sims 4: Vampires	November 14, 2017	PlayStation 4	Maxis Redwood Shores	
The Sims 4: Vampires	November 14, 2017	Xbox One	Maxis Redwood Shores	
Mass Effect: Andromeda	March 21, 2017	PlayStation 4	BioWare	
Mass Effect: Andromeda	March 21, 2017	Windows	BioWare	
Mass Effect: Andromeda	March 21, 2017	Xbox One	BioWare	
The Sims 4: Parenthood	May 30, 2017	Macintosh	Maxis Redwood Shores	
The Sims 4: Parenthood	May 30, 2017	Windows	Maxis Redwood Shores	
The Sims 4: Parenthood	June 19, 2018	PlayStation 4	Maxis Redwood Shores	
The Sims 4: Parenthood	June 19, 2018	Xbox One	Maxis Redwood Shores	
The Sims 4: Spa Day	May 30, 2017	Macintosh	Maxis Redwood Shores	
The Sims 4: Spa Day	May 30, 2017	Windows	Maxis Redwood Shores	
The Sims 4: Spa Day	June 19, 2018	PlayStation 4	Maxis Redwood Shores	
The Sims 4: Spa Day	June 19, 2018	Xbox One	Maxis Redwood Shores	
Madden NFL 18	August 22, 2017	PlayStation 4	EA Tiburon	
Madden NFL 18	August 22, 2017	Xbox One	EA Tiburon	
NBA Live 18	September 15, 2017	PlayStation 4	EA Tiburon	
NBA Live 18	September 15, 2017	Xbox One	EA Tiburon	
NHL 18	September 15, 2017	PlayStation 4	EA Canada	
NHL 18	September 15, 2017	Xbox One	EA Canada	
FIFA 18	September 29, 2017	Nintendo Switch	EA Vancouver / EA Romania	
FIFA 18	September 29, 2017	PlayStation 3	EA Vancouver / EA Romania	
FIFA 18	September 29, 2017	PlayStation 4	EA Vancouver / EA Romania	
FIFA 18	September 29, 2017	Windows	EA Vancouver / EA Romania	
FIFA 18	September 29, 2017	Xbox 360	EA Vancouver / EA Romania	
FIFA 18	September 29, 2017	Xbox One	EA Vancouver / EA Romania	
Need for Speed Payback	November 10, 2017	PlayStation 4	Ghost Games	
Need for Speed Payback	November 10, 2017	Windows	Ghost Games	
Need for Speed Payback	November 10, 2017	Xbox One	Ghost Games	
The Sims 4: Cats & Dogs	November 10, 2017	Macintosh	Maxis Redwood Shores	
The Sims 4: Cats & Dogs	November 10, 2017	Windows	Maxis Redwood Shores	
The Sims 4: Cats & Dogs	July 31, 2018	PlayStation 4	Maxis Redwood Shores	
The Sims 4: Cats & Dogs	July 31, 2018	Xbox One	Maxis Redwood Shores	
Star Wars Battlefront II	November 17, 2017	PlayStation 4	EA DICE	
Star Wars Battlefront II	November 17, 2017	Windows	EA DICE	
Star Wars Battlefront II	November 17, 2017	Xbox One	EA DICE	
EA Sports UFC 3	February 2, 2018	PlayStation 4	EA Canada	
EA Sports UFC 3	February 2, 2018	Xbox One	EA Canada	
Fe	February 16, 2018	Nintendo Switch	Zoink	
Fe	February 16, 2018	PlayStation 4	Zoink	
Fe	February 16, 2018	Windows	Zoink	
Fe	February 16, 2018	Xbox One	Zoink	
The Sims 4: Jungle Adventure	February 27, 2018	Macintosh	Maxis Redwood Shores	
The Sims 4: Jungle Adventure	February 27, 2018	Windows	Maxis Redwood Shores	
The Sims 4: Jungle Adventure	December 4, 2018	PlayStation 4	Maxis Redwood Shores	
The Sims 4: Jungle Adventure	December 4, 2018	Xbox One	Maxis Redwood Shores	
The Sims Mobile	March 6, 2018	Android	Maxis Redwood Shores / Firemonkeys Studios	
The Sims Mobile	March 6, 2018	iOS	Maxis Redwood Shores / Firemonkeys Studios	
Burnout Paradise Remastered	March 16, 2018	PlayStation 4	Criterion Games	
Burnout Paradise Remastered	March 16, 2018	Xbox One	Criterion Games	
Burnout Paradise Remastered	August 21, 2018	Windows	Criterion Games	
Burnout Paradise Remastered	June 19, 2020	Nintendo Switch	Criterion Games	
A Way Out	March 23, 2018	PlayStation 4	Hazelight Studios	
A Way Out	March 23, 2018	Windows	Hazelight Studios	
A Way Out	March 23, 2018	Xbox One	Hazelight Studios	
SSX 3	April 13, 2018	Xbox One	EA Canada	
FIFA Online 4	May 17, 2018	Windows	Electronic Arts / EA Spearhead	
Unravel Two	June 9, 2018	PlayStation 4	Coldwood Interactive	
Unravel Two	June 9, 2018	Windows	Coldwood Interactive	
Unravel Two	June 9, 2018	Xbox One	Coldwood Interactive	
Unravel Two	March 22, 2019	Nintendo Switch	Coldwood Interactive	
The Sims 4: Seasons	June 22, 2018	Macintosh	Maxis Redwood Shores	
The Sims 4: Seasons	June 22, 2018	Windows	Maxis Redwood Shores	
The Sims 4: Seasons	November 13, 2018	PlayStation 4	Maxis Redwood Shores	
The Sims 4: Seasons	November 13, 2018	Xbox One	Maxis Redwood Shores	
Madden NFL 19	August 10, 2018	PlayStation 4	EA Tiburon	
Madden NFL 19	August 10, 2018	Windows	EA Tiburon	
Madden NFL 19	August 10, 2018	Xbox One	EA Tiburon	
Madden NFL Overdrive	August 15, 2018	Android	Electronic Arts	
Madden NFL Overdrive	August 15, 2018	iOS	Electronic Arts	
NBA Live 19	September 7, 2018	PlayStation 4	EA Tiburon	
NBA Live 19	September 7, 2018	Xbox One	EA Tiburon	
NHL 19	September 14, 2018	PlayStation 4	EA Vancouver	
NHL 19	September 14, 2018	Xbox One	EA Vancouver	
FIFA 19	September 28, 2018	Nintendo Switch	EA Vancouver / EA Romania	
FIFA 19	September 28, 2018	PlayStation 3	EA Vancouver / EA Romania	
FIFA 19	September 28, 2018	PlayStation 4	EA Vancouver / EA Romania	
FIFA 19	September 28, 2018	Windows	EA Vancouver / EA Romania	
FIFA 19	September 28, 2018	Xbox 360	EA Vancouver / EA Romania	
FIFA 19	September 28, 2018	Xbox One	EA Vancouver / EA Romania	
The Sims 4: Get Famous	November 16, 2018	Macintosh	Maxis Redwood Shores	
The Sims 4: Get Famous	November 16, 2018	Windows	Maxis Redwood Shores	
The Sims 4: Get Famous	February 12, 2019	PlayStation 4	Maxis Redwood Shores	
The Sims 4: Get Famous	February 12, 2019	Xbox One	Maxis Redwood Shores	
Battlefield V	November 20, 2018	PlayStation 4	EA DICE	
Battlefield V	November 20, 2018	Windows	EA DICE	
Battlefield V	November 20, 2018	Xbox One	EA DICE	
Command & Conquer: Rivals	December 4, 2018	Android	EA Redwood Studios	
Command & Conquer: Rivals	December 4, 2018	iOS	EA Redwood Studios	
Iron Force 2	February 1, 2019	Android	CoolFish Games	
Apex Legends	February 4, 2019	PlayStation 4	Respawn Entertainment	
Apex Legends	February 4, 2019	Windows	Respawn Entertainment	
Apex Legends	February 4, 2019	Xbox One	Respawn Entertainment	
Apex Legends	March 9, 2021	Nintendo Switch	Respawn Entertainment, Panic Button	
Apex Legends	March 29, 2022	PlayStation 5	Respawn Entertainment	
Apex Legends	March 29, 2022	Xbox Series X/S	Respawn Entertainment	
Apex Legends	2022	Android	Respawn Entertainment	
Apex Legends	2022	iOS	Respawn Entertainment	
Apex Legends	August 5, 2025	Nintendo Switch 2	Respawn Entertainment	
Anthem	February 22, 2019	PlayStation 4	BioWare	
Anthem	February 22, 2019	Windows	BioWare	
Anthem	February 22, 2019	Xbox One	BioWare	
The Sims 4: StrangerVille	February 26, 2019	Macintosh	Maxis Redwood Shores	
The Sims 4: StrangerVille	February 26, 2019	Windows	Maxis Redwood Shores	
The Sims 4: StrangerVille	May 14, 2019	PlayStation 4	Maxis Redwood Shores	
The Sims 4: StrangerVille	May 14, 2019	Xbox One	Maxis Redwood Shores	
The Sims 4: Island Living	June 21, 2019	Macintosh	Maxis Redwood Shores	
The Sims 4: Island Living	June 21, 2019	Windows	Maxis Redwood Shores	
The Sims 4: Island Living	July 16, 2019	PlayStation 4	Maxis Redwood Shores	
The Sims 4: Island Living	July 16, 2019	Xbox One	Maxis Redwood Shores	
Sea of Solitude	July 5, 2019	PlayStation 4	Jo-Mei Games	
Sea of Solitude	July 5, 2019	Windows	Jo-Mei Games	
Sea of Solitude	July 5, 2019	Xbox One	Jo-Mei Games	
Madden NFL 20	August 2, 2019	PlayStation 4	EA Tiburon	
Madden NFL 20	August 2, 2019	Xbox One	EA Tiburon	
Madden NFL 20	August 2, 2019	Windows	EA Tiburon	
The Sims 4: Realm of Magic	September 10, 2019	Macintosh	Maxis Redwood Shores	
The Sims 4: Realm of Magic	September 10, 2019	Windows	Maxis Redwood Shores	
The Sims 4: Realm of Magic	October 15, 2019	PlayStation 4	Maxis Redwood Shores	
The Sims 4: Realm of Magic	October 15, 2019	Xbox One	Maxis Redwood Shores	
NHL 20	September 13, 2019	PlayStation 4	EA Vancouver	
NHL 20	September 13, 2019	Xbox One	EA Vancouver	
FIFA 20	September 27, 2019	Nintendo Switch	EA Vancouver / EA Romania	
FIFA 20	September 27, 2019	PlayStation 4	EA Vancouver / EA Romania	
FIFA 20	September 27, 2019	Windows	EA Vancouver / EA Romania	
FIFA 20	September 27, 2019	Xbox One	EA Vancouver / EA Romania	
Plants vs. Zombies: Battle for Neighborville	October 18, 2019	PlayStation 4	PopCap Games	
Plants vs. Zombies: Battle for Neighborville	October 18, 2019	Windows	PopCap Games	
Plants vs. Zombies: Battle for Neighborville	October 18, 2019	Xbox One	PopCap Games	
Plants vs. Zombies: Battle for Neighborville	March 19, 2021	Nintendo Switch	PopCap Games	
NFS Heat	November 8, 2019	PlayStation 4	Ghost Games	
NFS Heat	November 8, 2019	Windows	Ghost Games	
NFS Heat	November 8, 2019	Xbox One	Ghost Games	
The Sims 4: Discover University	November 15, 2019	Macintosh	Maxis Redwood Shores	
The Sims 4: Discover University	November 15, 2019	Windows	Maxis Redwood Shores	
The Sims 4: Discover University	December 17, 2019	PlayStation 4	Maxis Redwood Shores	
The Sims 4: Discover University	December 17, 2019	Xbox One	Maxis Redwood Shores	
Star Wars Jedi: Fallen Order	November 15, 2019	PlayStation 4	Respawn Entertainment	
Star Wars Jedi: Fallen Order	November 15, 2019	Windows	Respawn Entertainment	
Star Wars Jedi: Fallen Order	November 15, 2019	Xbox One	Respawn Entertainment	
Star Wars Jedi: Fallen Order	November 24, 2020	Stadia	Respawn Entertainment	
Star Wars Jedi: Fallen Order	June 11, 2021	PlayStation 5	Respawn Entertainment	
Star Wars Jedi: Fallen Order	June 11, 2021	Xbox Series X/S	Respawn Entertainment	

List of cancelled video games
Name	Platforms	Developer(s)	Ref
Batman: The Dark Knight	PlayStation 3	Pandemic Studios	
Batman: The Dark Knight	Xbox 360	Pandemic Studios	
Command & Conquer	Windows	Victory Games	
Dawngate	Windows	Waystone Games	
Miss Universe: The Game	PlayStation 4	EA Black Box	
Miss Universe: The Game	Windows	EA Black Box	
Miss Universe: The Game	Xbox One	EA Black Box	
NBA Live 13	PlayStation 3	EA Tiburon	
NBA Live 13	Xbox 360	EA Tiburon	
Need for Speed: Edge	Windows	EA Spearhead / Nexon	
Project Ragtag	PlayStation 4	Visceral Games	
Project Ragtag	Xbox One	Visceral Games	
Shadow Realms	Windows	BioWare	
Titanfall Online	Windows	Nexon / Electronic Arts	
Ultima X: Odyssey	Windows	Origin Systems	
Warhammer Online: Wrath of Heroes	Windows	BioWare Mythic	
Star Wars: Rise to Power	Android	EA Capital Games	

== See also ==
- List of Electronic Arts games
- List of Electronic Arts games: 1983–1999
- List of Electronic Arts games: 2000–2009
- List of Electronic Arts games: 2020–present
