= 7th British Academy Games Awards =

Game award ceremony in 2011

- Date: 16 March 2011
- Location: London Hilton
- Hosted by: Dara Ó Briain
- Best Game: Mass Effect 2
- Most awards: Heavy Rain (3)
- Most nominations: Assassin's Creed: Brotherhood, Call of Duty: Black Ops & Heavy Rain (7)

The 7th British Academy Video Game Awards (known for the purposes of sponsorship as GAME British Academy Video Games Awards) awarded by the British Academy of Film and Television Arts, was an award ceremony held on 16 March 2011 in the London Hilton. The ceremony honoured achievement in video gaming in 2010 and was hosted by Dara Ó Briain. Heavy Rain was the major winner on the night, taking three of the seven awards available.

== Winners and nominees ==
Winners are shown first in bold.

**Action**: **Assassin's Creed: Brotherhood – Ubisoft Montreal/Ubisoft**; Battlefield: Bad Company 2 – EA DICE/Electronic Arts; BioShock 2 – 2K Marin/2K Games; Call of Duty: Black Ops – Treyarch/Activision; God of War III – Santa Monica Studio/Sony Computer Entertainment; Halo: Reach – Bungie/Microsoft Game Studios	**Social Network Game**: **My Empire – Playfish**; Bejeweled Blitz – PopCap Games; Farmerama – Bigpoint; FIFA Superstars – Playfish, Electronic Arts; ZooMumba – Bigpoint; Zuma Blitz – Oberon Media, PopCap Games
**Artistic Achievement**: **God of War III – Santa Monica Studio/Sony Computer Entertainment**; Assassin's Creed: Brotherhood – Ubisoft Montreal/Ubisoft; Call of Duty: Black Ops – Treyarch/Activision; Heavy Rain – Quantic Dream/Sony Computer Entertainment; Limbo – Playdead/Playdead; Mass Effect 2 – BioWare/Electronic Arts/Microsoft Game Studios	**Sports**: **F1 2010 – Codemasters/Codemasters**; FIFA 11 – EA Canada/EA Sports; Football Manager 2011 – Sports Interactive/Sega; Gran Turismo 5 – Polyphony Digital/Sony Computer Entertainment; International Cricket 2010 – Trickstar Games/Codemasters; Pro Evolution Soccer 2011 – Konami/Konami
**Best Game**: **Mass Effect 2 – BioWare/Electronic Arts/Microsoft Game Studios**; Assassin's Creed: Brotherhood – Ubisoft Montreal/Ubisoft; FIFA 11 – EA Canada/EA Sports; Heavy Rain – Quantic Dream/Sony Computer Entertainment; Limbo – Playdead/Playdead; Super Mario Galaxy 2 – Nintendo EAD Tokyo/Nintendo	**Story**: **Heavy Rain – David Cage, Quantic Dream/Sony Computer Entertainment**; Alan Wake – Sam Lake, Mikko Rautalahti, Petri Järvilehto, Remedy Entertainment/Microsoft Game Studios; BioShock 2 – Jordan Thomas, 2K Marin/2K Games; Call of Duty: Black Ops – Craig Houston, Dave Anthony, David S. Goyer, Treyarch/Activision; Fallout: New Vegas – John R. Gonzalez, Obsidian Entertainment/Bethesda Softworks; Mass Effect 2 – Mac Walters, Drew Karpyshyn, BioWare/Electronic Arts/Microsoft Game Studios
**Family**: **Kinect Sports – Rare/Microsoft Game Studios**; Dance Central – Harmonix/MTV Games; Kinect Adventures! – Good Science Studio/Microsoft Game Studios; Kinectimals – Frontier Developments/Microsoft Game Studios; Lego Harry Potter: Years 1–4 – Traveller's Tales/Warner Bros. Interactive Entertainment; Toy Story 3: The Video Game – Avalanche Software/Disney Interactive Studios	**Strategy**: **Civilization V – Firaxis Games/2K Games**; Fallout: New Vegas – Obsidian Entertainment/Bethesda Softworks; FIFA Manager 11 – Bright Future GmbH and EA Sports/Electronic Arts; Napoleon: Total War – The Creative Assembly/Sega; Plants vs. Zombies – PopCap Games/PopCap Games; StarCraft II: Wings of Liberty – Blizzard Entertainment/Blizzard Entertainment
**Gameplay**: **Super Mario Galaxy 2 – Nintendo EAD Tokyo/Nintendo**; Assassin's Creed: Brotherhood – Ubisoft Montreal/Ubisoft; God of War III – Santa Monica Studio/Sony Computer Entertainment; Heavy Rain – Quantic Dream/Sony Computer Entertainment; Limbo – Playdead/Playdead; Mass Effect 2 – BioWare/Electronic Arts/Microsoft Game Studios	**Technical Innovation**: **Heavy Rain – Quantic Dream/Sony Computer Entertainment**; Assassin's Creed: Brotherhood – Ubisoft Montreal/Ubisoft; Call of Duty: Black Ops – Treyarch/Activision; Halo: Reach – Bungie/Microsoft Game Studios; Kinectimals – Frontier Developments/Microsoft Game Studios; Super Mario Galaxy 2 – Nintendo EAD Tokyo/Nintendo
**Handheld**: **Cut the Rope – ZeptoLab/Chillingo**; God of War: Ghost of Sparta – Ready at Dawn and Santa Monica Studio/Sony Computer Entertainment; Lego Harry Potter: Years 1–4 – Traveller's Tales/Warner Bros. Interactive Entertainment; Professor Layton and the Lost Future – Level-5/Nintendo; Sonic Colours – Sonic Team and Dimps/Sega; Super Scribblenauts – 5th Cell/WB Games	**Use of Audio**: **Battlefield: Bad Company 2 – EA DICE/Electronic Arts**; Alan Wake – Remedy Entertainment/Microsoft Game Studios; Assassin's Creed: Brotherhood – Ubisoft Montreal/Ubisoft; Call of Duty: Black Ops – Treyarch/Activision; DJ Hero 2 – FreeStyleGames/Activision; Limbo – Playdead/Playdead
**Multiplayer**: **Need for Speed: Hot Pursuit – Criterion Games/Electronic Arts**; Assassin's Creed: Brotherhood – Ubisoft Montreal/Ubisoft; Battlefield: Bad Company 2 – EA DICE/Electronic Arts; Call of Duty: Black Ops – Treyarch/Activision; Halo: Reach – Bungie/Microsoft Game Studios; StarCraft II: Wings of Liberty – Blizzard Entertainment	**BAFTA Ones to Watch Award (in association with Dare to Be Digital)**: **Twang! – PikPok**; Mush – Motion Twin; Sculpty – Team Tickle
**Original Music**: **Heavy Rain – Normand Corbeil. Quantic Dream/Sony Computer Entertainment**; Alan Wake – Petri Alanko, Remedy Entertainment/Microsoft Game Studios; Fable III – Russell Shaw, Lionhead Studios/Microsoft Game Studios; James Bond 007: Blood Stone – Richard Jacques, Bizarre Creations/Activision; Mass Effect 2 – Jack Wall, Jimmy Hinson, Sam Hulick, David Kates, BioWare/Electronic Arts/Microsoft Game Studios; Super Mario Galaxy 2 – Mahito Yokota, Ryo Nagamatsu, Koji Kondo, Nintendo EAD Tokyo/Nintendo	**GAME Award of 2010**: **Call of Duty: Black Ops – Treyarch/Activision**; Dance Central – Bungie/Microsoft Game Studios; FIFA 11 – EA Canada/EA Sports; Halo: Reach – Bungie/Microsoft Game Studios; Heavy Rain – Quantic Dream/Sony Computer Entertainment; Limbo – Playdead/Playdead; Mass Effect 2 – BioWare/Electronic Arts/Microsoft Game Studios; Need for Speed: Hot Pursuit – Criterion Games/Electronic Arts; Red Dead Redemption – Rockstar San Diego/Rockstar Games; Super Mario Galaxy 2 – Nintendo EAD Tokyo/Nintendo

=== Academy Fellowship ===
- **Peter Molyneux**

=== Games with multiple nominations and wins ===
==== Nominations ====
Nominations	Game
7	Assassin's Creed: Brotherhood
7	Call of Duty: Black Ops
7	Heavy Rain
6	Mass Effect 2
5	Super Mario Galaxy 2
5	Limbo
4	Halo: Reach
3	Alan Wake
3	Battlefield: Bad Company 2
3	FIFA 11
3	God of War III
2	BioShock 2
2	Dance Central
2	Fallout: New Vegas
2	Kinectimals
2	Lego Harry Potter: Years 1-4
2	Need for Speed: Hot Pursuit
2	StarCraft II: Wings of Liberty

==== Wins ====
Awards	Game
3	Heavy Rain
