= My Empire =

2010 video game

- Developer: Playfish
- Release: 13 May 2010
- Genre: Simulation
- Mode: Single-player with multiplayer interaction

My Empire is a city building game with an ancient Greco-Roman theme. The game was developed and published by Playfish and was released via Facebook in May 2010. In 2011 My Empire became the inaugural winner of the Social Network Game category at the 2011 BAFTA Video Game Awards.

The game was deliberately targeted at an older age range than Playfish's previous Facebook games, as the developer thought that there was an under-served market that the game would be able to capitalise on.

Playfish took My Empire and five other games offline in September 2011, citing a lack of players.

Playfish had also used the game to experiment with mobile phone integration with Facebook games. In November 2010, it launched an app that allowed users to manage their tax collection and resources in the game via their mobile phone, but the users weren't able to play the full game on the phone.

== Gameplay ==
The player starts the game in a small village with a low population. The goal of the game is for the player to expand their village into a large city. The player achieves this by building new homes to increase the population and by building leisure buildings to keep them happy. To generate money, the player must hire a tax collector to collect taxes from the people.

Certain gameplay aspects are only achievable by engaging with other players; for example, the player can't obtain all of the materials used in the construction of a "wonder", like Stonehenge, on their own, they will require a friend to gift them one of the materials used.

== Reception ==
Gamezebo scored the game as 4/5 and praised the graphics and the simplification of the city building to a fun activity. The size of the cities were praised along with the fact that the game doesn't make money management an essential part of the game. It criticised the uneven pace and called the user interface "unintuitive", it also thought that the tax system was a little broken and that some gameplay goals are not obvious enough.
