= Mindshapes =

- Company type: Private
- Industry: Interactive Learning; Electronic Publishing; Online Education; Educational Software
- Headquarters: London, UK
- Key people: Shukri Shammas (Chairman and Co-Founder); Chris Michaels (co-CEO); Nina Pustilnik (co-CEO); Sami Lababidi (CTO and Co-Founder); Christian Dorffer (CIO and Co-Founder); Tareq Naqib (CFO and Co-Founder)
- Products: My Story World
- Website: www.mindshapes.com

Mindshapes is an interactive learning company that creates virtual worlds and apps that help children and adults learn through gameplay. Founded in October 2010, the company is headquartered in London and has offices in Los Angeles and San Francisco. Mindshapes’ products include educational apps for the iPad, iPhone and iPod Touch for children aged 2–12, as well as their flagship product My Story World.

Mindshapes secured $5 million (£3.1 million) of Series A funding in November 2011 from the company’s five founders and unnamed angel investors.

== Company Background ==
Mindshapes is led by co-CEOs Chris Michaels and Nina Pustilnik. Other notable staff include Chairman Shukri Shammas; CTO George Taylor, "Chief Ninja" Sami Lababidi; Creative Director Raj Pathmanathan, CIO Christian Dorffer; and CFO Tareq Naqib. Shammas and Lababidi were two of the four co-founders of Playfish, which was acquired by Electronic Arts in November 2009.

== Products ==
Mindshapes looks to “promote learning through a fusion of gaming and educational principles”. The company has a team of advisors specialising in education, including Professor Paul Harris at the Harvard Graduate School of Education. Mindshapes also partners with charities such as the National Literacy Trust.

Mindshapes has published a range of educational children’s apps for the iPhone, iPad and iPod Touch. Aside from My Story World, their apps include The Opposites; Casper’s Scare School; Lingo Zoo; Meteor Math; Hickory Dickory Dock; Jack and the Beanstalk by Mindshapes; Jellytoons Toddler Skills: Bobo’s Birthday Challenge and Tap-a-Tune.
