= Who Has The Biggest Brain? =

2009 video game

- Developer(s): Playfish
- Publisher(s): Playfish
- Release: 2009

Who Has The Biggest Brain? is a brain training social video game by Playfish and published on Facebook Connect. It was Playfish's first game. The game, along with other Playfish titles like Word Challenge and Geo Challenge, were rolled out onto iOS. EA acquired the rights to the game in 2009 after acquiring Playfish.

The title sees the player work through memory, math, and spatial games to get a brain score. The game consisted of 4 minigames, 60 seconds each. The leaderboard showed both the player's Facebook photo and score and that of their nearest competitors.

By March 2009, the game had been played over 500 million times by over 15 million people with current monthly active player base of nearly 4.2 million people.

On August 30, 2011, it was the announced the game along with other Playfish titles would be axed on September 30.

== Critical reception ==
Pocket Gamer deemed it "excellent and frighteningly addictive".
