= SimCity Social =

2012 video game

- Developer: Playfish
- Publisher: Electronic Arts
- Series: SimCity
- Platform: Facebook
- Release: June 25, 2012
- Genre: City-building game

SimCity Social is a defunct online social game for the Facebook social network where users create their own city and interact with cities of their Facebook friends. The game was developed by Playfish and published by Electronic Arts. The game was announced at the Electronic Entertainment Expo 2012, during EA's press conference on June 4, 2012, and released on June 25, 2012.

On April 14, 2013, it was announced that the game would be shutting down. On June 14, 2013, SimCity Social and The Sims Social both ceased completely, with no possible access to the game. This was met with very negative response from players of both games.

== Objective ==
Like its forebear, SimCity, the objective is to design and build a city without specific goals although in SimCity Social, optional goals are introduced in the form of quests.

== Gameplay ==
This is a resource-based game. Players must collect various resources which are then consumed to develop or maintain the city. Development is performed by clicking directly on city buildings or surrounding undeveloped land, accessing a menu where resources can be purchased or manipulated (and some resources temporarily stored) or through a series of online dialogues that form quests. Some resources replenish over time while other resources are obtained for direct actions with buildings, visiting neighbors or requesting resources from them, or can be purchased with credit card or PayPal from the developer's online store.

Additional themed quests that are only available for a limited amount of time, such as a week or two, regularly appear. Completion of these quests unlock exclusive buildings not available at any other time. With new quests, new buildings and new collectibles are introduced.

=== Resources ===
- Energy is a resource needed for many actions. It recovers at the rate of one energy every three minutes. It can be purchased as batteries which can be used to replenish energy later in the game. Energy can also be donated by other players (it does not reduce a donor's own energy resources), and can be earned by visiting neighboring cities and performing actions. Energy is fully replenished when a player reaches the next level of experience.
- Diamonds are also earned on certain quests and every time the player (as mayor) increases a level of experience. Diamonds are required to purchase premium content, but can also be used to skip quests, collectible requirements, and wait time.
- Simoleons are the in-game currency. They are accumulated mainly by interacting with businesses, but also from farms and student jobs.
- Materials are used to build and upgrade many structures. They are accumulated by interacting with factories or sending trains from the station.
- Fame develops as the player interacts with neighboring territories. Fame can be used for a variety of special purchases.
- Experience (XP) appears as turquoise stars and builds a player's level. When experience reaches 100%, there is a reward of simoleons, one diamond, and full energy replenishment.
- Collectibles are items that are released by interacting with structures. These are used in developing structures after they have been bought or completing quests. Many collectibles are connected specifically with the type of building they can be released from, such as ticket stubs from attractions or x-ray plates from hospitals.
- Population increases unlock specific quests or buildings. It also increases the level of the mayor's house.
- Neighbors (other players which are befriended through Facebook) can also staff your structures when necessary, for instance facilities and farms both need a specific complement of avatars from SimCity Social friends to be fully operational. Interaction with neighbors' buildings also provide specific "friend/foe" collectibles and a more developed relationship (either positively or negatively) increases the likelihood of their appearance.

=== City building ===
Building can only take place on flat, solid land where trees have been bulldozed. All player constructions can be moved at no cost during game play providing the structure has reached a minimum level of development. Some existing game structures may be developed by the player, Some of these require expending purple diamonds to move. The initial city is on a small central area of developable land and a player must purchase more land for expansion using simoleons and collectible land permits.

Structures fall into ten categories, some of which require a minimum city population to unlock:

- Roads - connect buildings together. They have no cost to build and no cost to remove. Many developments that are unconnected by roads will not function appropriately.
- Homes - cost one energy unit and 100 simoleons to build. They generate population as they develop, and their development depends on distance to the waterfront as well as other buildings in the locality. There is no direct way for a player to directly affect the population of a building - only indirectly by the placement of homes or population-increasing structures. The maximum population for a 2 x 2 tile home is 660, but can be upgraded up to 1600.
- Farms - The two farm types, vegetable and animal, are purchased using simoleons and generate simoleons as crops/goods mature. Unlike businesses, the amount of time to produce (and therefore the amount of simoleons produced) are variable, but crops can rot and therefore return less simoleons if not collected soon after they are ready.
- Businesses - There are several different types of businesses. Most businesses are simply bought, though some business are the result of quests, or require either diamonds or fame to acquire. Businesses generate simoleons on a regular basis, and can produce more when upgraded.
- Factories - Factories have a similar range of diversity as businesses, and are obtained in the same way. Factories generate materials on a regular basis, but may also create a pollution cloud, which negates or blocks the structure it is on until it is cleaned at the cost of one energy unit.
- Attractions - Attractions increase the population of housing nearby. The effect and range increase with upgrades, as well as their appearance.
- Decorations - These include statues, billboards, trees, grass, flowers, pavement, and small entertainment structures such as Ferris wheels or playgrounds. These small structures increase population in nearby housing, or can boost the output of businesses and factories by a certain percentage.
- Facilities - Hospitals, fire and police stations all cost simoleons and materials to construct. When they are active in the city, vehicles leave the facilities to control fires, crimes or medical emergencies. Upgrades increase the number of vehicles, and therefore the effectiveness of these facilities.
- Landmarks - Large structures that have a substantial impact on population increase in local housing. Landmarks can be accessed through quests, or purchased by simoleons, diamonds, materials or fame.
- Friend or foe - These can only be purchased with fame, and most require "friend/foe" collectibles to be built. They act as landmarks do.

== Awards ==
During the 16th Annual D.I.C.E. Awards, the Academy of Interactive Arts & Sciences awarded SimCity Social with "Web Based Game of the Year".

== See also ==
- CityVille
- The Sims Social
- SimCity (2013 video game)
