= Crazy Planets =

Facebook multiplayer game

Crazy Planets was a game created by Playfish on the Facebook platform. It was available for some time but then was disconnected from Facebook for revisions. It was never put back online.

== Business model ==
Crazy Planets uses a micropayments model, in which players can purchase Playfish Cash to buy virtual goods in the game.

== Gameplay ==
Crazy Planets is an artillery game which uses Facebook's social networking to establish multiplayer games. Gameplay centers around missions on various planets and meteors using a variety of weapons to destroy enemy robots. Additionally, players collect coins, experience points, and gems while on missions, and can collect metals from their own planet as well as friends' planets once per day. Coins can be spent while on a mission for power-ups, such as increased damage or restoring health, and can also be spent to customize the player's home planet. When enough Experience Points (XP) are accumulated, the player's level increases. Gems are used, in conjunction with metals, to upgrade or purchase new weapons.

== Critical reception ==
VentureBeat criticized the lack of participation from other Facebook users and the inability to upgrade weapons quickly without resorting to micropayments. The difficulty curve was considered a problem, with "boring" grinding required to progress at some points. Overall, Crazy Planets was deemed adequate, but did not compare favorably with the Worms franchise.

IGN said that "It isn't anything like the company's other games" and affirmed that cropping a Facebook profile image onto the face of your spacemen "sounds very simple in concept, but it's actually quite funny to witness in the game".

Adweek said that "it's not as in-depth as the original Worms games, but it does have that pleasant feel" and praised the game for utilizing the basic concept and applying it in a unique way.
