= Pet Society =

Playfish/Electronic Arts game on Facebook

- Pet Society logo
- Developers: Playfish, Electronic Arts
- Platform: Facebook
- Release: August 8, 2008
- Genre: Digital pet
- Modes: Single-player, multiplayer interaction

Pet Society was a social-network game developed by Playfish that could be played on Facebook. The game ranked as one of the most popular Facebook applications. Players could design their pets by choosing genders, names, colors and altering appearances. The user interacted with their pets through washing, brushing, petting and feeding.

The game was launched August 8, 2008 by Playfish and at its "peak had 50 million monthly players, 5 million daily players and made as much as $100,000 a day by selling in-game items." Electronic Arts acquired Playfish in November 2009. The game was scheduled to close on June 14, 2013; the server shut down on June 18.

An iOS version, Pet Society Vacation was released in 2011 with similar gameplay, but set on a tropical island with new settings like an underwater reef.

== Gameplay ==
Players' pets could interact with each other within the "friend" network. Pets could visit the pets of their owner's friends and perform activities with these pets (washing, grooming, feeding, etc.) A pet could visit other pets as many times a day as it wished. The players received coins and Paw Points on their first visit of the day to each friend, but earn only Paw Points for subsequent visits. Participating in the Daily Lottery, visiting friends, winning awards, cleaning or playing with pets, winning hurdle races, or betting on the outcome of hurdle races also provided players with ways to earn coins. Visiting friends, buying items, and using the stadium earned players Paw Points.

Paw Points were akin to XP/EXP (Experience) in other social games of the sort; gaining sufficient paw points made the pet level up. When a pet leveled-up, the player received coins, new features and special statuses. During Pet Society's initial release, there were 34 levels. In 2009, after houses were enlarged to accommodate 10 rooms, 13 additional levels were added, bringing the total to 47. In August 2010, the level cap of Pet Society was raised to 100. Some certain items were required to be bought at a certain level.

== Reception ==
Gamezebo gave it 5 out of 5 stars, liking the content variety and fun unique activities, but warning the players aren't raising pets.

== See also ==
- Playfish
