= The Sims Social =

2011 video game

- Developer: Playfish
- Publisher: Electronic Arts
- Writer: Sean Baity
- Platform: Facebook Platform
- Release: August 9, 2011
- Genres: Dating sim, Social simulation

The Sims Social was a Facebook addition to the Sims series of video games. It was announced during the Electronic Entertainment Expo 2011 press conference. As with the original Sims games, The Sims Social lets the user create their own customizable character. In this version, however, the player uses their character to interact with those of their Facebook friends. The characters can develop likes or dislikes for other Sims, creating relationships that can be publicized on the user's Facebook page.

== Description ==
The Sims Social was a Facebook videogame developed by Playfish and EA, taking place in a fictional town called Littlehaven. A mobile application for smartphones was in development as a companion app to the Facebook version. The game also features remakes of real life famous people such as Lady Sim-Sim (Lady Gaga), Elvis Plumbob (Elvis Presley), and Sims Cara (Sin Cara).

=== Skills ===
Like other games in The Sims series, Sims could develop skills. There were six skills: art, cooking, music, writing, athletic, driving, and various project skill items which were tied with specific themed collections. Developing higher level skill levels allowed Sims to obtain new objects. Sims developed skills when the player interacted with an art object (such as easel or computer when level 30), a music object (such as a guitar or keyboard when level 10), a cooking object (such as a microwave, a coffee maker when level 10, or a stove when level 15), or a writing object (such as a computer or typewriter when level 10). At times, skills were a part of quests given to the player for their Sim to achieve.

=== Careers ===
However, careers in The Sims Social were much different than those of previous Sim games. Sims could aspire to three different career paths: Rocker, Chef, and Artist. Each career consisted of 5 levels each with three sub-levels. To advance in their given career players were required to submit appointments for various jobs. After the given appointment time the player could send their Sim to work and earn Simoleons and Career Points. Career Points helped further careers leading to promotions. After each promotion players received a special object only acquirable through a career. Upon completion of an entire career track, players could select a new career track at the cost of forgoing all past career history.

=== Traits ===
There were 12 traits for Sims in The Sims Social and could only be purchased with Lifetime Points. All traits featured between three and five levels; each needing to be bought at a higher price of Lifetime Points than the last one. The traits were: Slob, Steel Bladder, Neat, Super Mechanic, Insane, Ogre, Ninja, Great Kisser, Night Owl, Expert Cook, Music Maestro, and Art Virtuoso. When the player upgraded the level of a trait, the trait became more prominent in the Sim's lifestyle. The most visible example of this was in the Ninja trait. When a Sim had the level one Ninja trait, the Sim walked faster. However, when a Sim had the level five Ninja trait, they could teleport from place to place. The Ninja trait was useful if the player had a larger house. In the Insane trait, Sims could reduce the need of being social and could talk to plants without visiting people (in previous versions, talking to plants also eliminated the energy needed to fulfill Social). For example, a level 4 Insane trait let the sim talk to themselves to fulfil Fun and Social need without eliminating energy. Certain career traits, like Art Virtuoso, provided the benefit of earning more Simoleons while using the respective skill object. However, these traits could only be unlocked by reaching specific career levels.

=== Needs and Energy ===
In The Sims Social, Sims had needs, just as with other games in The Sims series. However, unlike other games in the series, Sims could not die. There were six needs: Social, Fun, Hunger, Hygiene, Bladder, and Sleep. When all of the needs were fulfilled, the player's Sim became inspired. Inspired Sims earned more Simoleons when performing skill tasks. Sims with a bad mood would not follow the directions of the player. Instead, they fulfilled their own needs by autonomy. All mood meters cycled from deep green (good) to lighter green, yellow, orange, red, and finally gray. All needs could be improved from the Sim's home. Another feature located next to the needs was the fun meter. This could variate largely depending on the Sim's personality. For example, a Sim with an athletic personality would not find playing computer and arcade games as enjoyable as a Sim with a geek personality. Sims took care of themselves using autonomy. If left to their own devices, Sims performed actions that helped out the lowest meter, provided they had an appropriate object nearby. This could not go on extended periods of time, as eventually the game paused and told the player "Your Sim Needs You!", or to keep playing the game.

=== Currency ===
The Sims Social had four currencies: Simoleons, SimCash, Social Points, and Lifetime Points. These currencies were used to purchase items in the game. Simoleons were the most basic currency and could be most readily earned by performing almost any non-autonomous task. SimCash could be obtained by purchasing them with real-world currencies; however, an update to the game permitted users to earn up to 10 SimCash as a reward for playing the game on 5 consecutive days. SimCash allowed the player to purchase special and limited edition objects. When the player began the game, they received 40 free SimCash. Social Points were obtained by performing social interactions with other Sims. These could be used to purchase objects that were not available using Simoleons. You could exchange the Social Points for Simoleons by buying a Social Point item and selling them. Similar to Lifetime Happiness Points in The Sims 3 and The Sims 2, Lifetime Points were a currency only used for buying specific traits. They were the only currency that could not be bought through SimCash but rather earned by completing various quests or levelling up on skill objects.

=== Social Interaction ===
Unlike its predecessors, The Sims Social used the socializing features of Facebook to allow players to send and receive gifts in order to finish certain quests or objects. For example, when a Sim levelled up a skill, they needed certain items to unlock the next level. Most of these items were obtained by sending requests to other friends or by interacting with friends' Sims. This proved problematic to players who did not have a large amount of friends. When the player was unable to obtain objects from friends, the only other option was to skip the task using SimCash. Furthermore, certain items, such as double beds and couches, had a hammer icon in the right corner, denoting that 'some assembly is required'. To assemble these items, a player needed certain items that usually could only be obtained by sending requests to friends.

Players could pursue three different relationships with their friends' NPCs. They could become friends, rivals, or enter into a romance. There were various relationship levels to be unlocked, going from acquaintances to friends, to BFFs or friendly rivals. Each relationship path gave the player different social interactions, as well as different tasks that could be performed at friends’ homes. For example, rivals could be rude to one another by insulting each other, playing pranks, messing with household appliances, and other negative interactions, once the player reached a new relationship level. Certain relationship levels required the other party to first approve the relationship status before they were reflected in the game.

=== Crafting ===
In addition to building items and unlocking skills, players could use items found by performing tasks to craft special potions and complete collections. Players could craft numerous potions that provided benefits to Sims. For example, a Fun Potion instantly maxed out a Sim's fun level, or a Bad Mood potion instantly tanked all a Sim's needs. Depleting needs was helpful when finding certain items. Items could be crafted by going to the crafting section at the bottom of the screen. Other crafting items included free Energy and Simoleons. Hovering over items that were required showed ways to obtain them in-game. Once all of the required items had been obtained, players could click on the crafting button and craft the item. The crafted item was then stored in the player's backpack. Many ingredients could also be gifted to other players.

== Reception ==
Since its release to the public, the game had accumulated over 65 million players, with over 16 million added in its first week alone. It was one of the fastest growing Facebook games of all time and was the fifth most-used Facebook application in less than a month of release. Starting on September 9, 2011, The Sims Social temporarily became the second-most popular Facebook game. After two months at #2, its decline dropped its ranking, with unfixed glitches and errors and lack of content updates that other top games (like FarmVille) maintain largely to blame.

=== FIFA Superstars promotional stadium ===
After The Sims Social has been launched, Playfish had given The Sims Social Stadium for EA Sports FIFA Superstars. The promotion had started at mid-September 2011 that player need to reach level 10 in The Sims Social to claim them, before it is removed. The promotional stadium has been added on September 23, 2011.

=== November 2012 - The Sims Social drops out of the top 25 facebook games ===
As of the November 2012 AppData charts (which charts the popularity of Facebook games) the DAU (Daily Average Users) of The Sims Social dropped out of the top 25 for the first time, with many users commenting on Facebook that difficulty achieving goals and repetitive tasks make the game unattractive compared to rivals.

== Awards ==
On February 9, 2012, The Sims Social won the Social Networking Game of the Year award at the 15th Annual Interactive Achievement Awards, and on February 15, 2012, The Sims Social was nominated for best online browser game by the British Academy Video Game Awards - a subsidiary of the British Academy of Film and Television Arts.

== Closure ==
On April 15, 2013, Electronic Arts announced that The Sims Social, along with SimCity Social and Pet Society, would be closed down on June 14, 2013. The closures of all three titles occurred 3 days later than expected on June 17, 2013. However, pages for all three games are still in existence.
