= Interactive Learning =

Interactive learning is a pedagogical approach that incorporates social networking and urban computing into course design. In interactive learning, people collaborate to share information. The concept of serious games involves immersing students in virtual worlds by means of role-playing and interactive games; it is similar to the concept of distance education.

In the 2020s, interactive learning has increasingly been supported by digital platforms that incorporate artificial intelligence to generate and adapt educational content. Tools such as learning management systems and AI-based authoring platforms enable the creation of interactive lessons, quizzes, and simulations tailored to individual learners. Examples include widely used systems like Moodle and Canvas, as well as newer platforms such as Mexty.ai, which focus on automated course generation and personalized learning experiences.

== See also ==
- E-learning
- MOOCs
