= Titanfall (video game) =

2014 multiplayer first-person shooter video game

- Developer: Respawn Entertainment (Note: Bluepoint Games developed the Xbox 360 version.)
- Publisher: Electronic Arts
- Director: Steve Fukuda
- Producer: Drew McCoy
- Designer: Justin Hendry
- Programmers: Richard Baker; Earl Hammon Jr.
- Artist: Joel Emslie
- Writer: Jesse Stern
- Composer: Stephen Barton
- Series: Titanfall
- Engine: Source
- Platforms: Windows; Xbox One; Xbox 360
- Release: March 11, 2014: Windows, Xbox One; NA: March 11, 2014; AU: March 13, 2014; EU: March 13, 2014; NZ: March 14, 2014; UK: March 14, 2014 Xbox 360; NA: April 8, 2014; AU: April 10, 2014; EU: April 11, 2014
- Genre: First-person shooter
- Mode: Multiplayer

Titanfall is a 2014 first-person shooter game developed by Respawn Entertainment and published by Electronic Arts. It was released for Windows and Xbox One on March 11, 2014; an Xbox 360 version ported by Bluepoint Games was released April 8, 2014. The game was anticipated as the debut title from developers formerly behind the Call of Duty franchise.

In Titanfall, players control "Pilots" and their mech-style Titans, and fight in six-on-six matches set in the war-torn outer space colonies of the Frontier. The game is optimized for fast-paced, continual action, aided by wall-running abilities and populations of computer-controlled soldiers. Up to 50 characters can be active in a single game, and non-player activity is offloaded to Microsoft's cloud computing services to optimize local graphical performance. The game's development team began work on the title in 2011, and their Titan concept grew from a human-sized suit into a battle tank exoskeleton. The team sought to bring "scale, verticality, and story" to its multiplayer genre through elements traditionally reserved for single-player campaigns. The 65-person project took inspiration from Blade Runner, Star Wars, Abrams Battle Tank, and Masamune Shirow of Ghost in the Shell.

Titanfall won over 60 awards at its E3 2013 reveal, including a record-breaking six E3 Critics Awards and "Best of Show" from several media outlets. It also won awards at Gamescom and the Tokyo Game Show. Titanfall received generally favorable reviews. Reviewers praised its balance, Smart Pistol weapon, player mobility, and overall accessibility for players of all skill sets, but criticized its thin campaign, disappointing artificial intelligence, and lack of community features and multiplayer modes. Critics considered the game a successful evolution for the first-person shooter genre but did not agree as to whether the game delivered on its anticipation. A sequel, Titanfall 2, was released for Windows, PlayStation 4, and Xbox One in 2016.

== Gameplay ==
Gameplay from within a 20-foot Titan, with full heads-up display

Titanfall is a shooter game played from a first-person perspective. Players fight as free-running foot soldier "Pilots" who can command agile, mech-style robots—"Titans"—to complete team-based objectives. The game is set on derelict and war-torn colonies at the Frontier, the fringe of space exploration, as either the Interstellar Manufacturing Corporation (IMC) or the Frontier Militia. Online multiplayer is the sole game mode, but contains single-player elements such as cutscenes, plot, character dialogue, and non-player characters (NPCs). Titanfall has no offline, single-player, or local splitscreen modes, and does not support system link over a local area network (LAN). Respawn founder Vince Zampella described the game as bringing "scale, verticality, and story" to the first-person shooter genre of multiplayer gaming.

Up to twelve human players choose their pilot types and are dropped on the map, beginning the game. Titans can be deployed periodically, based on an onscreen timer, which must complete its countdown to zero before a Titan can be summoned. Killing other players reduces the amount of time remaining. When summoned, players are told to "standby for Titanfall", whereupon a Titan drops from the sky, surrounded by a protective forcefield. Unlike player-characters in games like Call of Duty and Battlefield, pilots are agile and accumulate momentum while running (similar to Tribes). Players run on walls, double jump with a jet pack, vault over obstacles, glide across ziplines, and chain together combos. Pilot and Titan controls are identical except where the pilot's double jump becomes the Titan's dash, as Titans cannot jump. The Titans, somewhere between battle tanks and a mecha, are slower than the nimble pilots but are much better protected and have powerful weapons. Battles include artificial intelligence soldiers (human grunts and robotic spectres) that are designed as human player competition, support, and scenery. Games end with a race to the losing team's evacuation dropship.

The pilot's tactical abilities include x-ray vision, invisibility cloaking, and regenerating speed boosts. Pilots use ten traditional customizable weapons, including a semi-automatic shotgun, machine guns, assault rifles, sniper rifles, and the Smart Pistol Mk5. The latter locks onto multiple targets before firing multiple shots in a burst. Players generally require three Smart Pistol shots to die. The pistol can shoot around corners. All pilots have anti-Titan weapons equipped. Pilots can hop on a Titan's back to "rodeo" and shoot its weak spot, or otherwise use four anti-Titan weapons to take them down. Player-pilots can eject from Titans that take too much damage, and the Titan replacement timer is reset upon the Titan's death.

There are three unique Titan classes, variants of light, medium, and heavy, with inversely related speed and armor: the all-rounder Atlas, the bulky Ogre, and the fleet-footed Stryder. The latter two chassis are unlocked upon finishing both faction campaigns and were later made unlockable by leveling up as well. Each chassis has a respective Core power that works on a cooldown timer: respectively, increased damage, increased shields, and unlimited dashes. Titan tactical ability options include stopping enemy ammunition in midair to throw back in their direction, emitting electrified smoke to hurt and repel pilots climbing the Titan's back, and deploying a defensive wall. Additionally, players can equip two perk kits to customize for their preferred strategy. Their primary weapons include rocket launchers, lightning cannons, and chainguns. Titans can act autonomously when put in guard and follow modes, which directs the Titan either to protect their vicinity or to tail their pilot, respectively.

There are 15 multiplayer maps and five multiplayer modes in the base game. In Attrition, a traditional Team Deathmatch, teams compete for the greatest kill count, and bot kills and Titan kills are counted. Pilot Hunter is similar to Attrition, but only counts pilot kills. In Hardpoint Domination, the object is to capture and defend areas of the map. In Last Titan Standing, players begin the match in Titans and have a single life. There is also a Capture the Flag mode. All modes are team-based and there are no free-for-alls. Completing challenges unlocks new abilities, weapons, customization opportunities, and burn cards: single-use, single-life power-ups that bestow a temporary gain, such as reduced Titan drop waits, unlimited grenades weapons, or disguise as a computer-controlled Spectre. Players can bring up to three cards into a match. Through multiplayer matches, players earn experience points that unlock new equipment and perks. Players who reach level 50 can "regenerate" to back to level 1, trading their rank and unlocks for faster experience gain and a prestige icon next to their names.

The game's "campaign multiplayer" is separate from the game's regular multiplayer (called classic internally), and serves as an extended tutorial. It plays as multiplayer with single-player elements, such as scripted cinematic sequences, non-playable character dialogue, an in-game soundtrack, and audio briefings. There are separate campaigns for the Militia and IMC factions, and the game randomly assigns the player to one for a series of nine maps. Each mission is paired with a specific game type and map, supplemented by minimal voiceover narration, which was later removed. The Militia are a paramilitary organization made up of disgruntled civilians, smugglers, pirates, and criminals of the Frontier and the resistance against IMC use of colony resources. They are led by former IMC officer and Titan Pilot James MacAllan, engineer and mission coordinator Cheng "Bish" Lorck, and covert operative Sarah Briggs who handles Titan deployment. The corporate conglomerate IMC specializes in natural resource extraction, and came to the resource-rich Frontier for business. Leading their mercenary forces are Frontier operations commander-in-chief Vice Admiral Marcus Graves, intel specialist Sergeant Kuben Blisk, and artificial intelligence companion Spyglass who handles Titan deployment.

== Synopsis ==
=== Setting ===
Humanity lives in the deepest reaches of explored space in a vast region known as The Frontier. It contains inhabited star systems, but many more worlds remain uncharted. Most people will never travel this far away from normal civilization, but for pioneers, explorers, mercenaries, outlaws, and soldiers, the Frontier offers both adventure and opportunity.

Major interplanetary corporations such as Hammond Robotics—a major manufacturing, aerospace and defense contractor—use resources of the Frontier to make builds of mecha-combatants such as Titans and Spectres. Titans are descendants of present-day fledgling military exoskeletons. In addition to the obvious combat applications, unarmed forms of Titans are used in heavy industries like cargo transport and deep space ship salvage. They are also used in special applications such as deep space search and rescue, and are very effective in inhospitable environments. The use of Titans is widespread throughout the Frontier in both combat and civilian life. As with Titans, the Frontier contains Pilots of many different styles and experiences. Titan Pilots are rated by 'certifications', most of which apply to civilian applications, such as construction, shipping, and heavy salvage industries. The most prestigious of these is the Full Combat Certification - a widely published series of tests that grade a Titan Pilot's abilities. Because of the extreme physical and mental challenges of mastering both Titan combat and dismounted parkour movement, a fully combat certified Titan Pilot is a rare find, and the combat skills of active Pilots in the field varies widely throughout the Frontier.

The Interstellar Manufacturing Corporation (IMC) started out small, in natural resource extraction industries, under the name Hammond Engineering. Increasing demand for Titan manufacturing materials, combined with Hammond's market-cornering planetary survey technology and map database rights, contributed to explosive growth for the company. Over the course of a century, a series of acquisitions, mergers, and re-brandings lead to the transformation of Hammond Engineering into the ruthless commercial empire that is the IMC. With the Frontier's valuable shipping lanes and vast planetary resources ripe for exploitation, the IMC is dedicated to maximizing profits and shareholder wealth, using the legal application of force when necessary.

The Frontier Militia represents the military arm of the Frontier systems' territorial defense pact. The Militia is a loosely governed mishmash of homesteaders, bandits, mercenaries, and pirates, all rising up as 'citizen soldiers' when the need arises. Each brigade within the Militia is responsible for fighting in an assigned section of Frontier territory. Although some brigades are little more than vast pirate organizations, the Militia has enough resources to be a real obstacle to the IMC's ambitions on the Frontier. The Militia claims that direct action against the IMC is in the best interest of the homesteaders whom they allegedly represent, but not everyone on the Frontier sees it that way.

Eventually, a war breaks out on the Frontier between the IMC and the Militia, known as the Titan Wars. Hammond Robotics distributes many resources to these factions—mainly the IMC—to use combatants such as Titans, Spectres and MRVN-created technology for advanced warfare. Militia commanders such as Sarah and Cheng "Bish" Lorck struggle against the IMC, led by Vice Admiral Marcus Graves. During the events of Titanfall, Pilots, Grunts, Spectres and Titans of the IMC and Militia go through stages of war in multiple locations.

=== Plot ===
Following the death of General Anderson, forces of the 1st Militia Fleet led by Cheng "Bish" Lorck and Sarah Briggs conduct a raid on an IMC fueling facility in an effort to refuel their ships while IMC forces led by Vice Admiral Marcus Graves attempt to stop them by setting up defensive turrets to wipe out the Militia's ships. The raid ends with the Militia stealing enough fuel to last a month but losing several ships in the process.

After the raid, the IMC chases the Militia to the nearby planet of Troy, where the Militia attempts to hide. The IMC encounters a colony of humans on the planet, which was thought to have been uninhabited. Suspecting the colony to be hiding Militia forces, Graves has Sergeant Kuben Blisk lead ground forces on the planet and decides to use the opportunity to test their new model of robot infantry, Spectres. After killing the majority of the colony, the Militia decides to step in and help the colonists. A battle ensues in the colony during which both sides are contacted by the colony's leader James MacAllen, an ex-IMC officer and Titan Pilot who expresses outrage at its destruction. When he learns that his former commanding officer Graves is involved in the colony's destruction, he contacts the Militia and offers to help them beat the IMC in exchange for evacuating the remaining survivors at the wreckage of the IMS Odyssey.

The Militia makes contact with MacAllan at the Odyssey and helps him buy time to allow his people to escape while he attempts to extract data from the ship's computers. The IMC attempts to capture MacAllan and secure the crash site. The IMC ultimately fails to capture MacAllen and he escapes with tactical data to destroy the IMC's primary fueling facility on the planet Demeter and cut off its reinforcements from the core systems. MacAllan soon takes command of the 1st Militia Fleet and has it extract a former IMC pilot and MacAllan's wingman Robert "Barker" Taube as he is essential for MacAllan's plan to succeed. Having come up with the strategy together with MacAllan, Graves sends his own forces overseen by Spyglass to capture Barker and an all out battle ensues which results in Barker’s escape and the IMS Sentinel suffering severe damage. Although Graves attempts to have the Sentinel repaired at Outpost 207, a surprise attack led by Sarah puts the ship out of action to slow the IMC down.

MacAllan has Barker lead them to a secret decommissioned IMC facility known as the Boneyard to analyze a prototype of a Repulsor Tower, a device that repels hostile wildlife from Demeter's main defense force on the IMC's Airbase Sierra in an attempt to learn how to shut them down. Knowing MacAllan's plan, Graves has his forces try to scuttle the facility before they learn too much. Regardless, the Militia learns enough to build a device called "The Icepick" to disable the towers and commence their attack on the Airbase. They successfully manage to disable the base's defenses, leaving it vulnerable to attacks from hostile alien fauna.

Now able to attack Demeter directly, MacAllan personally leads the Militia forces on the ground to try and destroy the fueling facility while Blisk drops in with the IMC's forces in an attempt to stop him. During the battle, MacAllen attempts to find a way to ensure Demeter's destruction while being pursued by Blisk. MacAllan ultimately seals himself inside the facility's reactor chamber and sets it to self destruct, sacrificing himself and his ground forces to ensure Demeter's destruction. With no way to save Demeter, Graves orders Blisk to retreat before requesting dropships to evacuate his forces. However, Spyglass countermands his order and cancels the dropships as there is no more time to evacuate their troops safely. MacAllan then requests Graves take his place in leading the 1st Militia Fleet before dying along with both the IMC and Militia forces on the ground. Now cut off from the core systems, the IMC is forced on the defensive while a disillusioned Graves and several high ranking IMC officers defect to the Militia.

Three months later, Graves has taken command of the 1st Militia Fleet and goes on the offensive against the IMC to destroy one of many IMC robotics factories, due to the IMC becoming increasingly dependent on automated infantry. With masses of human combatants having defected from the IMC to the Militia, the newly promoted Vice Admiral Spyglass and Commander Blisk coordinate the factory's defense. During the battle, Graves attempts to reason with Blisk that they will lose the war but is quickly refuted as being a coward and a traitor. Following the battle, Spyglass makes an announcement that although the IMC is on the defensive they are still a force to be reckoned with while the Militia plays an inspirational message recorded by MacAllan before his death stating that they will fight for independence across the Frontier.

== Development ==
Following Call of Duty: Modern Warfare 2's release, Activision fired Infinity Ward co-founders Jason West and Vince Zampella in March 2010 for "breaches of contract and insubordination". Their departure resulted in a series of lawsuits and a staff exodus. Later that year, West and Zampella founded a game development company, Respawn Entertainment, composed largely of the former Infinity Ward staff—those responsible for the successful Call of Duty series. (Note: Ars Technica's Peter Bright described Call of Duty: Modern Warfare as the definitive "twitch multiplayer first-person shooter" for its number of unlockables, close-quarters maps, and reflex-driven gameplay.) The company started with a completely blank slate. The ideas that became Titanfall slowly accreted over the next two years.

Pre-production began in 2011, and Respawn's first game was originally planned for seventh generation consoles. The idea for the game did not come easily, and the team arrived at its multiplayer-only and human-mech focus after much internal debate. The team started with open collaboration about games and game mechanics they found exciting, and no market research. Respawn artist Joel Emslie recalled starting with a human-sized suit as a "second skin", which the designers grew in size. As Respawn didn't have the necessary computers, the artists resorted to kitbashing and model making—Emslie prototyped by putting a figurine inside a plastic model kit. The team progressed to detailed, foot-high "mechettes" made of wood, wire, and plastic, which became the Atlas Titan. Project influences include Blade Runner, Star Wars, Abrams Battle Tank, and Masamune Shirow of Ghost in the Shell. Emslie refers to the aesthetic as a "used future". Their production was unconventional, similar to Infinity Ward's old practices, and the game lacked design documentation. At E3 2011, Electronic Arts Labels president Frank Gibeau revealed that Respawn's first project was a science fiction shooter published by Electronic Arts. Two project leads left the company to begin their own studio in mid-2012, (Note: These were Todd Alderman and Frank Gigliotti, who formed Scary Mostro in August 2012 after their lawsuit against Activision ended in mid-2012.) and West retired in March 2013.

Rather than responding to the outgoing console generation's technical restrictions with code optimization and a tight release near the end of the consoles' life cycle, the team decided to focus on the eighth generation with more time to try new ideas. Zampella announced that Respawn would show at E3 2013 via Twitter on February 25, 2013. Their planned announcement leaked early through the premature release of Game Informer's July 2013 issue on Google Play, which revealed their first game's title, premise, and release date. Other advance public information included the company's trademark filing for "Titan" in April 2013, and an April 2013 Kotaku report of the game's Titan mech gameplay and Xbox One exclusivity. The game was officially announced during Microsoft's E3 2013 press conference, with expected Windows PC, Xbox 360, and Xbox One releases in Q1 2014. The Xbox 360 version was announced as in development with Respawn's support at another studio, though Bluepoint Games was not announced as the studio until January 2014. Electronic Arts CFO Blake Jorgensen later added that the Microsoft exclusivity agreement would last "for the life of the title", such that other consoles, including the PlayStation 4, will not receive a Titanfall port. (Note: Zampella confirmed in 2016 that the PlayStation 4 would not receive a port of the game.) In February 2014, Zampella tweeted that Respawn was discussing an OS X port for release some time after launch. The team's small size—less than a quarter of similar triple A studios—also contributed to the game's exclusivity.

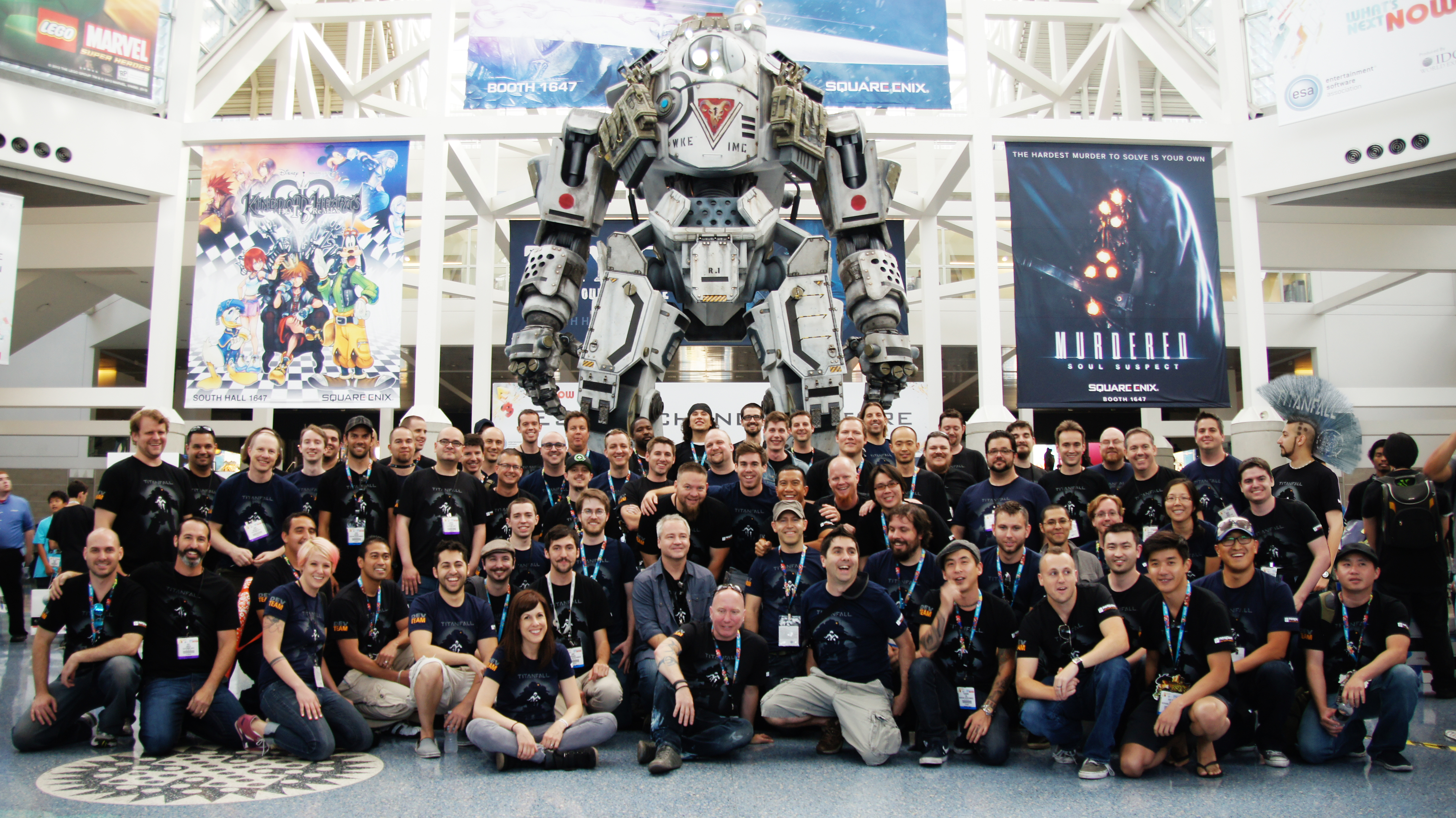
Respawn Titanfall team at E3 2013

The 65-person development team experimented with different gameplay before consolidating to three goals: "player mobility, survivability, and the merging of cinematic design with fast-paced action". They identified contemporary first-person shooters as restricted to "a single plane of movement", the cardinal directions and hiding in place, and considered new features to increase mobility, such as a three-story-high jump. Final mobility features include wall running and the pilot's jump kit, which allows for double jumps. The parkour mechanics came from a similar, basic wall running mod made by a Respawn programmer for Half-Life 2 when testing potential game engines. (Note: Producer Drew McCoy recalled being amazed and changed upon watching the programmer kill an enemy from above in an early, familiar scene where a Combine soldier normally stops the player.) Additionally, the game does not cordon off parts of the environment. Concerning survivability, Respawn chose to populate the environment with dozens of computer-controlled characters to give players the reward of consecutive kills while reducing the player deaths necessary in return. The team spent significant time balancing the "cat and mouse" combat between pilots and Titans. They annulled advanced sniping techniques known as "quickscoping and no-scoping". Thirdly, the cinematic storytelling segments associated with single-player campaigns were merged into the multiplayer mode. A single player mode was prototyped but ultimately scrapped due to lack of both time and manpower.

The decision to combine modes allowed Respawn to conserve resources traditionally split between separate teams. Player count changed weekly and was playtested often, more as a question of design than technical feasibility. Early Titanfall playtest players did not realize that they were playing against human opponents for over 45 minutes. Respawn originally tested teams of eight, 12, and various decreasing sizes before they decided on teams of six Lead designer Justin Hendry said that more human players make the game "uncomfortable" not due to overcrowding but to the intensity of maintaining one's surroundings against many points of entrance. Producer Drew McCoy wrote that the non-human artificial intelligence (AI) players were not bots meant to replace humans, but "a different class of character in the game". Each team supports up to 12 AI players alongside the human players' autonomous mode Titans, for close to 50 active characters per game. The AI players were designed to enliven the battlefield environment with a greater sense of scale and drama, and to increase the game's complexity with new opportunities for strategy and cannon fodder for Titans. McCoy said the team's foremost goal was to make the game fun.

Respawn chose to build Titanfall on the Source game engine early in their production cycle due to their developers' familiarity and its ability to maintain 60 frames per second on both the Xbox 360 and PlayStation 3. In an interview, Respawn software engineer Richard Baker said the company chose Source since Portal 2 performed well on the PlayStation 3 with it, and the console was "the riskiest platform in seventh generation". The company built upon the engine during development in features such as lighting, rendering, visibility, networking, and tools pipelines. The game also uses Microsoft Azure cloud computing platform for multiplayer servers, physics, and artificial intelligence. Offloading this non-player activity frees the local console for visual rendering tasks and better graphics, and the developers for game development (instead of backend maintenance). This arrangement determines world events in the cloud instead of locally, so position and movement data is downloaded simultaneously by all player-clients. The studio's cloud server access is considered vital to the game's viability, and Respawn artist Joel Emslie said they would not have attempted this game without the cloud support. The team ran a small alpha test and followed up with a large beta test to stress test the new Xbox Live compute platform as one of the first games to use the network. The platform broke for seven hours at one point of the test. Lead programmer Jon Shiring figured that the ten problems they found during the test were ten problems they didn't need to find at launch. Respawn felt that Kinect support did not suit the game and chose not to support the peripheral. The development team reported considerable interest in support for esports competitive play, and while such features were not prioritized for the initial release, Respawn indicated that esports accommodations were under consideration for future iterations.

The game was feature complete as of December 2013, and the Respawn team continued to address game bugs and balancing issues before launch. Respawn ran a closed beta test with an open registration in February 2014 that saw two million unique users. An Xbox One patch to bring support for Twitch streaming video was designed to coincide with Titanfall's release. Respawn announced that the release version was finalized for distribution ("gone gold") on February 26, 2014.

=== Audio ===
Titanfall's composer Stephen Barton had previously worked on Call of Duty soundtracks and with Metal Gear Solid composer Harry Gregson-Williams. Barton joined the project in early 2013. The game's E3 demo had sparse, placeholder audio and did not feature any final mixes, which were expected to be completed by November 2013. Barton sought to make the soundtrack "distinctive", with several main themes that build through the game. The music was designed "as commentary", to not compete with the action. Titanfall being a multiplayer game, Barton produced a large number of tracks to avoid repetition. The sound ranges from "a very abused hurdy-gurdy to heavy electronics" to "Morricone-esque baritone guitars". Barton emphasized "taking sounds out of their context" to match the game's lawless futuristic setting. The two opposing Titanfall teams each have their own musical identities. Titanfall's soundtrack was recorded at Abbey Road Studios in London, with some specialty ethnic instrumentation recorded in Los Angeles.

== Release and marketing ==
Titanfall was released on Xbox One and Windows PC (via Origin) in North America on March 11, 2014, in Europe and Australia on 13, and in the United Kingdom and New Zealand on 14. The game's South African release was cancelled due to poor connectivity performance during the beta and no nearby Microsoft Azure data center in the region. Australia, in a similar predicament, used Singapore's servers at the time of launch. The delayed Xbox 360 release developed by Bluepoint Games was released on April 8, 2014 in North America, on April 10, 2014 in Australia and New Zealand, and on April 11, 2014 in Europe. The Xbox 360 version is functionally identical to the other releases, albeit with lower-quality graphics. A downloadable Xbox Live Games on Demand option was not available at launch but was implemented later. The PC version did not include modding tools at launch, though it did support the Xbox 360 controller. Microsoft hosted over 6,000 midnight launch events worldwide to prepare for the release.

Respawn produced both free and paid post-release downloadable content (DLC) and offered a season pass discount for pre-purchasing. Three DLC packs are expected with the season pass. The first Titanfall downloadable content (DLC) pack, Expedition, was announced at PAX East 2014 for release in May 2014. Its story occurs after the campaign in the ancient alien ruins of "Swampland", water "Runoff", and training simulator "War Games" maps. Upcoming DLC will likely not change the number of Titan chassis. Electronic Arts designed the game's digital strategy to coexist with their other shooter, Battlefield 4, and the game does not use microtransactions. The free updates include features such as private matches that were left out of the original release for time restrictions. The private match feature was added in April 2014. An additional, free update will bring new burn cards and multiplayer modes, and an upcoming PC patch will add 4K video and Nvidia graphics processing unit support. The company is also planning a companion smartphone app.

Following release, Respawn tracked user cheating habits with FairFight software and began to dole out community bans for PC users who used exploits such as aimbots and wallhacks on March 21, 2014. FairFight checks gameplay against statistical markers and flags players for graduated penalty levels. Flagged players are restricted to games with other cheaters, as "the Wimbledon of aimbot contests". Respawn rolled out multiplayer matchmaking tweaks around the same time that prioritized fair matches of player skill.

The collector's edition includes a Titan statue set in a LED-lit diorama, an art book, and a poster. A limited edition Xbox One wireless controller designed after the game's C-101 carbine weapon launched alongside the game. It was built to feel like "a piece of military spec hardware transported from the universe of Titanfall ... into players' hands". An Xbox One console bundle was released simultaneously with the game, and includes a digital copy of Titanfall and a month of Xbox Live at the price of the standalone console.

K'Nex announced a toy marketing tie-in for 2014. Respawn announced other marketing tie-ins in late January including apparel, Jinx clothing, Mad Catz peripherals (keyboards, mice, mouse pads, headsets), posters, Prima strategy guides, a Titan Books art book, Turtle Beach Xbox One headsets, USB flash drives. Before release, Electronic Arts and Respawn unveiled a browser game collection of three Atari games (Asteroids, Missile Command, and Centipede) with an added Titanfall theme. Respawn also announced forthcoming Titanfall live action content from a partnership with Canadian post-production studio Playfight. Figurine manufacturer Threezero announced in March 2014 that they will produce 1/12 to 1/6 scale models of Titanfall Titans and pilots. A worldwide marketing campaign included large statues of Titans across multiple cities, and an advertising campaign that spanned billboards, television commercials, Twitch, the web, and YouTube.

Respawn released a Deluxe Edition for Windows, Xbox One, and Xbox 360 platforms in late 2014. The expanded game includes all three downloadable content expansions alongside the main game. Around the same time, Respawn announced that over seven million people had played Titanfall across all platforms.

== Reception ==
Titanfall took over 60 awards at its E3 2013 reveal, including a record-breaking six E3 Critics Awards: Best in Show, Best Original Game, Best Console Game, Best PC Game, Best Action Game, and Best Online Multiplayer. The game also won Best in Show from IGN, Destructoid, Game Informer, and Electronic Gaming Monthly. Reporting for Polygon at E3, Arthur Gies praised the "dynamism" between the Titan's brute force and the pilots' objective-based stealth as the game's greatest asset. IGN's Ryan McCaffrey declared Titanfall both "Microsoft's killer app" and multiplayer gaming's "next big thing", adding, "You will buy an Xbox One for Titanfall, and you should." Forbes's Erik Kain similarly predicted the game to be a "huge selling point" for the Xbox One. The game won Best Next Generation Console Game and Best Xbox Game at Gamescom 2013. The game was introduced to Japan at the 2013 Tokyo Game Show, where the response was "overwhelmingly positive" and it won a Future Award. Titanfall won "Most Anticipated Game" at VGX 2013. Also, at the 2014 National Academy of Video Game Trade Reviewers (NAVGTR) awards the game won Game, Original Action and received three nominations: Original Dramatic Score, New IP (Stephen Barton), Control Precision (Earl Hammon Jr.) and Animation, Technical (Bruce Ferriz, Mark Grigsby, Paul Messerly). During the 18th Annual D.I.C.E. Awards, the Academy of Interactive Arts & Sciences nominated Titanfall for "Action Game of the Year", "Outstanding Achievement in Animation", and "Outstanding Achievement in Game Design". Many critics considered Titanfall to be the next step for the first-person shooter genre, and the game received abundant "hype" and publicity from video game journalists.

Reception

Aggregate score
| Aggregator | Score |
|---|---|
| Metacritic | XONE: 86/100; PC: 86/100; X360: 83/100 |

Review scores
| Publication | Score |
|---|---|
| Edge | 8/10 |
| Electronic Gaming Monthly | 10/10 |
| GameSpot | 9/10 |
| IGN | 8.9/10 |
| Official Xbox Magazine (US) | 8.5/10 |
| Polygon | 9/10 |

Titanfall received "generally favorable" reviews, according to review aggregator website Metacritic. Critics praised the game's pilot–Titan balance, its Smart Pistol, fast-paced player mobility, and accessibility for players of all skill sets. Reviewers complained that the AI grunts were too unintelligent, that private match and community support features were lacking, and that the game had shipped with too few multiplayer modes. Multiple reviewers cited the Titan's feeling of grandiosity in the player experience—specifically, the thrill of watching a summoned Titan fall from the sky, but also the feeling of entering the Titan exoskeleton and of scaling a Titan to take it down.

Arthur Gies of Polygon wrote that the game's controls felt streamlined and natural. He felt empowered by his awareness of his potential strengths and vulnerabilities behind his choices. IGN's Ryan McCaffrey praised the balance between weapons. He called the Smart Pistol his "favorite sidearm since the Halo 1 pistol", but noted that its range and several-second lock-on balanced the gun's fairness. GameSpot's Chris Watters thought the pistol was a "neat twist on the humble sidearm". Dan Whitehead, writing for Eurogamer, compared the Smart Pistol to the inventive weapons of the Resistance series and otherwise wasn't impressed with the weapons. Gies of Polygon wished for more customization options and IGN's McCaffrey praised the maps, which ranged from "very good to great"—from the fast-action ziplines in the very good desert "Boneyard" to the great tiny village "Colony" with crowded houses to exchange gunfire across varied heights.

VG247's Dave Cook wrote that simplifying the game as "just Call of Duty with mechs" was unjustified given its freshness and innovation, though The Verge's Andrew Webster said "just Call of Duty with mechs" is essentially what it is. Cook added that the parkour elements "turn the Call of Duty format on its head" and that Titanfall addressed all issues with Call of Duty's game balance. Multiple reviewers referred to Titanfall as Call of Duty: Future Warfare or a variant whereof. Edge noted that the parkour elements made them approach at an angle instead of rushing directly at the dots on the mini-map, and GameSpot's Chris Watters said simple player movement was both a pleasure and a challenge. The Verge's Vlad Savov wrote that wall running "hasn't felt this good since ... the Prince of Persia series". Eurogamer's Whitehead said other shooters felt "leaden and limited" after playing Titanfall.

Reviewers found the campaign poorly executed. Edge called it "nonsense", and Dan Whitehead of Eurogamer said it was "as clichéd as it is shallow". IGN's McCaffrey wrote that the story became "background noise" in an otherwise chaotic game. Tom Watson said in New Statesman that "the game is devoid of a decent plot". Writing for The Verge, Adi Robertson compared the plot to the backstory on 1990s CD-ROM user manuals, and OXM's Mikel Reparaz felt his actions were unimportant to the narrative. Ars Technica's Peter Bright called the campaign's voice acting "some of the worst ... [he's] ever heard—flat and uninspired".

Reviewers noted how the game borrowed from games in other genres, such as DOTA and League of Legends. McCaffrey of IGN considered the AI soldiers both a valuable game mechanic and "worthless fodder" at once. Edge called Titanfall "a game of time management", spent planning when timers will deplete and activate powers. Peter Bright of Ars Technica wrote that the nature of the Titan timers turned every mode into a deathmatch, regardless of objective. IGN's McCaffrey referred to the experience point "grind" and the Titanfall timer as the game's "two economies". He also praised Respawn for not using microtransactions with the game, especially with burn cards. Writing for Edge, Neil Long compared burn cards to FIFA Ultimate Team's power-ups. Whitehead of Eurogamer wrote that the game begins to drag after level 25 and slows into a grind, though its flow overall is effortlessly cool, like a "first-person Crackdown". Watson said that "the combat challenges are dull and repetitive".

Edge wrote that Titanfall's major issue was the Xbox One, which performed less admirably compared to the PC version. GameSpot's Chris Watters acknowledged that the PC's higher resolution was expected and that the Xbox 360 version had an even lower resolution, frame rate issues, and texture pop-in, though it still handled the game well. Peter Bright of Ars Technica wrote that the game's visuals were "lacking", with flat lighting and static environments. OXM's Mikel Reparaz thought that the title should have been a launch release, where it would have been easier to overlook its sparse content. Minding the processing power behind the battles, the reviewers were not particularly impressed by the graphics. Eurogamer's Dan Whitehead compared the game's aesthetics to Pacific Rim and District 9.

Reviewers thought Titanfall was a successful evolution of the genre, with GameSpot's Chris Watters calling it "a great leap forward for shooters" and EGM's Chris Holzworth declaring the game "unquestionably worthy of all the praises sung about it", but Eurogamer's Whitehead concluded that the game was "more of a step forward ... than a leap". Polygon's Arthur Gies said Titanfall was not the "kind sea change Modern Warfare started". Peter Bright of Ars Technica wrote that the game's multiplayer was "not groundbreaking" and did not surpass Call of Duty's, and Edge decided that Titanfall "might not be Xbox One's killer app". Reflecting on a lack of sales data a month after release, Paul Tassi wrote that the "buzz" surrounding Titanfall's release "seemed to fade abnormally quickly" and that the game has not "capitalized on the goodwill it had ahead of, and even during, launch". Calling the game a disappointment, Watson said "People paid for it, played it for two weeks, then left it completely". While EA COO Peter Moore told investors on a May 2014 call that the game had sold 925,000 retail copies in the United States during its launch month, that number came from an external NPD Group report that Titanfall was March's top-selling game. NPD Group reported it was April's top-selling game as well. As of May 2014, EA had not released figures on Titanfall's sales, an uncommon practice that drew skepticism from journalists such as Paul Tassi. IGN reported that Titanfall sold ten million copies as of October 2015, but other sources could not conclude whether the Vince Zampella source tweet meant ten million units sold or unique players.

=== Cheating and current status ===
Starting in 2019, the game's status has been questioned. Customers reported matchmaking issues, years of DDOS attacks and some reported the game thinks they do not have all DLC map packs installed when they do. The game has been called "unplayable" and "utterly broken".

Its Steam release is marked with an "Overwhelmingly negative" response from user reviews. The game has been reported to suffer from numerous unpatched vulnerabilities that can be used to crash or overload servers and disconnect players. On April 5, 2021, Respawn Entertainment said via Twitter "We're aware of ongoing DDOS attacks affecting @Titanfallgame.To the Titanfall community: Help is coming ASAP".

On July 4, 2021, the game Apex Legends, also by Respawn Entertainment, was hacked to include instead of the usual playlists, the URL "savetitanfall.com" with the subheader, "[Titanfall 1] is being attacked so is Apex". Those affected by the hack were reported to be unable to join other playlists. Because of this hack, the game was rendered unplayable. The advertised website claims EA and Respawn Entertainment are "...willingly pretending that they do not know about the situation." Going further, claiming EA and Respawn are committing "fraud" by continuing to sell the game. Given the game's instability and low player count, Respawn Entertainment announced that they would be ending sales of Titanfall and removing the game from subscription services on March 1, 2022. However, should a player still own the game, the servers will still be available.

== Sequel and spin-offs ==
Jaz Rignall of USgamer revisited Titanfall in late 2015 and found the game still worthy of its original praise, though he noted that its technical details—namely graphics and framerate—showed some age. He felt that the game's content issues, apart from the light campaign, were resolved by the free additional maps. Overall, Rignall said that Titanfall had been replaced by newer shooter games.

On March 12, 2015, Respawn confirmed that a sequel is in development for Windows, PlayStation 4 and Xbox One. Respawn also announced that the company is working with Nexon to develop multiple Titanfall games like Titanfall: Frontline for iOS and Android on October 29, 2015. Unlike its predecessor, Titanfall 2 would have a traditional single-player campaign. On April 11, 2016, Respawn released a teaser trailer for Titanfall 2, stating that more information will be released at E3 2016.

In 2016, EA had announced that it was partnering with Nexon to create an Asian market specific version of Titanfall called Titanfall Online, similar to Counter-Strike Online and Call of Duty Online. This version was based on the first Titanfall rather than the sequel with some slight differences to the original game like four main pilots in the game, the introduction of a new titan, and a new map. The game had a closed beta in 2017. Titanfall Online was eventually canceled during 2018.

In January 2017, Titanfall: Frontline was cancelled, but in that same year, Nexon and Respawn announced that another mobile spin-off game, Titanfall: Assault, a top-down real-time strategy game, will be released on the same platforms as Frontline.

In early 2019, Respawn Entertainment released a battle royale hero shooter hybrid, set in the same universe as Titanfall, titled Apex Legends, which features 60 players split into 20 teams of 3 fighting to be the last team standing. Notably, Apex Legends does not feature Titans or Pilots but retains many weapons, abilities and equipment from the preceding Titanfall games.

In April 2025, EA canceled an unannounced first-person extraction shooter set in the Titanfall universe, internally known as Project R7. The cancellation was part of a broader organizational restructuring at EA, which included laying off between 300 and 400 employees, approximately 100 of whom were from Respawn.
