= Titanfall Online =

- Developer: Nexon
- Publisher: Nexon
- Series: Titanfall
- Platform: Microsoft Windows
- Release: KOR: December 15, 2016
- Genre: First-person shooter
- Mode: Multiplayer

Titanfall Online (Korean: 타이탄폴 온라인) was a cancelled free online first person shooter developed by Nexon based on the Titanfall series. The game was created to target the Asian market similar to other "Online" version of games like Call of Duty Online and Battlefield Online. The game had a beta launch in South Korea in 2016 with plans to expand to China and other countries. The game was cancelled and servers shutdown in 2018.

== Overview ==
The game was developed to target the Asian market and marked the second time that Electronic Arts had partnered with Nexon to develop a game for this specific region having worked together multiple times to develop titles in the FIFA Online series. The game has a mix of features from the first game as well as unique content. The game is mainly based on the original Titanfall with mechanics, maps, and weapons from the first game appearing in this one as well the inclusion of three new weapons and an exclusive map. Unlike the previous title, Titanfall Online only featured four titans, three from the original game and a new unique titan, Destroyer, based on the Ogre. The game also featured four unique pilots that the player could choose from: Iron, Starseeker, Hollow, and Preacher. Even though each character was given their own backstory and unique design, all the pilots play the same with the only difference between them being cosmetic. The Titanfall series would not see the feature of special playable characters until the release of Apex Legends.
