= Playfish =

Video game developer

Playfish Ltd
- Type: Subsidiary
- Industry: Video games, social network service
- Founded: 2007; 19 years ago
- Founders: Kristian Segerstrale; Sebastien de Halleux; Sami Lababidi; Shukri Shammas
- Defunct: 2013
- Fate: Retired
- Headquarters: London, England, United Kingdom
- Number of locations: London, San Francisco, Beijing, Oslo (former headquarter)
- Parent: Electronic Arts (2009–2013)
- Website: playfish.com

Playfish was a short-lived developer of free-to-play social network games. Playfish was founded in 2007 by Kristian Segerstråle, Sebastien de Halleux, Sami Lababidi, and Shukri Shammas. It closed in 2013. Playfish in the past had tended to attract up to 55 million users a month, with over 37 million users coming from Facebook users.

In October 2008, they secured US$17 million in venture capital funding from Accel Partners and Index Ventures. The company was acquired by Electronic Arts in 2009, with the last of Playfish's games being retired in 2013.

== History ==
Who has the Biggest Brain? was the company's first release. It was one of the first Facebook games to attract millions of daily players, and allowed the company to raise the funding necessary to produce other games. The company made money by selling virtual goods inside its games.

On Monday, 9 November 2009, Electronic Arts announced their acquisition of Playfish for $400 million. The acquisition was initially for $275 million cash and $25 million in equity—with a further $100 million in performance-based bonuses available if the company hits targets set by EA executives. As of February 2013, all four of the original founders have left the company, with Lababidi and Shammas setting up educational developer Mindshapes, and Segerstråle returning to the world of startups.

On 14 June 2013, all of the Playfish-developed games had been retired while Madden NFL 13 Social was retired on 2 September 2013, and can no longer be played on Facebook. The last three games to be retired (Pet Society, The Sims Social, and SimCity Social) were retired on 17 June 2013.

== List of games ==
Title	Platform	Released	Retired
Who Has The Biggest Brain?	Facebook	18 December 2007	30 September 2011
Word Challenge	Facebook	1 May 2008	30 September 2011
Bowling Buddies	Facebook	8 May 2008	30 September 2011
Pet Society	Facebook	8 August 2008	14 June 2013 (Note: While it was announced to be retired on 14 June, the game was actually retired on 17 June 2013.)
Geo Challenge	Facebook	22 September 2008	30 September 2011
Minigolf Party	Facebook	27 January 2009	27 January 2010
Restaurant City	Facebook	28 April 2009	29 June 2012
Crazy Planets	Facebook	1 July 2009	1 December 2011
Country Story	Facebook	29 July 2009	1 December 2011
Quiztastic!	Facebook	14 August 2009	4 March 2010
Poker Rivals	Facebook	7 December 2009	7 June 2011
Gangster City	Facebook	26 January 2010	7 June 2011
Hotel City	Facebook	26 March 2010	30 September 2011
My Empire	Facebook	1 June 2010	30 September 2011
EA Sports FIFA Superstars	Facebook	10 June 2010	31 March 2013
Pirates Ahoy!	Facebook	10 August 2010	7 June 2011
Madden NFL Superstars	Facebook	31 August 2010	14 May 2013
Monopoly Millionaires	Facebook	31 January 2011	17 August 2012
World Series Superstars	Facebook	30 March 2011	31 December 2012
The Sims Social	Facebook	9 August 2011	14 June 2013
NHL Superstars	Facebook	5 October 2011	14 May 2013
RISK: Factions	Facebook	11 January 2012	31 March 2013
SimCity Social	Facebook	25 June 2012	14 June 2013
Madden NFL 13 Social (also available on iOS)	Facebook	5 October 2012	2 September 2013
Pet Society Vacation	iOS	18 July 2011	29 August 2012
Restaurant City: Gourmet Edition	iOS	22 August 2011	29 August 2012

== Notable games ==
=== Restaurant City ===
In Restaurant City, players own a restaurant in a set environment. The goal is to run an exceedingly popular restaurant and increase in restaurant level and dish quality. A restaurant needs at least two employees to function; a chef and a waiter. Through popularity, a restaurant can attract more customers. As a restaurant attracts more customers, it needs more employees. A restaurant gains the ability to hire more employees as it rises in level. The restaurant also grows in size as it gains levels, and can serve drinks and grow certain ingredients in a garden.

At its peak, Restaurant City had more than 18 million monthly active users. This number dropped to 1.8 million by 2012, and the game was retired on 29 June 2012. During the 13th Annual Interactive Achievement Awards, the Academy of Interactive Arts & Sciences nominated Restaurant City for "Social Networking Game of the Year".

=== Pet Society ===
In Pet Society, players own virtual pets in a "neighborhood." Players can dress up their pets, decorate their homes, go fishing, cook dishes, and dig for treasures. Gaining "paw points" allows players to eventually level up to Level 100. Players can also send gifts and do a crafting challenge to make an item. It was announced on 15 April 2013, that the game would be retired on 14 June 2013, however it was retired on 17 June 2013, instead.

=== Madden NFL Superstars ===
Madden NFL Superstars is a spin-off of the popular Madden NFL American football video game series. Players create a team out of current real-life NFL players and compete in 3 different types of games: league games against computer generated teams, scrimmage games against friends, and scrimmage games against real NFL teams. As players progress they collect coins to purchase upgrades to their stadiums, collect fans, hire NFL coaches, and purchase tiered rating level card packs of NFL players to add to their rosters. It was retired on 14 May 2013, while replaced with Madden NFL 13 Social, which retired on 2 September 2013.

=== The Sims Social ===
The Sims Social is a Facebook addition to The Sims franchise. This game took place in a fictional town called Littlehaven. In The Sims Social, players create their own Sim, or character, which they can customize. They can then interact with the Sims of their friends, decorate their home, advance their Sim in their dream job and develop romantic relationships. The game often took inspiration from famous public figures such as Lady Gaga and Elvis Presley. Unlike other The Sims games, only one NPC was introduced and can interact with player's Sim, Bella Goth.

On 9 February 2012, The Sims Social won the Social Networking Game of the Year award at the 15th Annual Interactive Achievement Awards and 15 February 2012, the game was nominated for best online browser game by the British Academy Video Game Awards - a subsidiary of the British Academy of Film and Television Arts. It was announced on 15 April 2013, that the game would be retired on 14 June 2013, however it was retired on 17 June 2013, instead.

=== SimCity Social ===
SimCity Social is a city building game which allows the player to build city. This is the Facebook game version of the SimCity franchise. It was announced on 15 April 2013, that the game would be retired on 14 June 2013, however it was retired on 17 June 2013 instead.

== Playfish Cash ==
Players were eligible to buy "Playfish Cards" at Walmart, Walgreens, and Toys "R" Us stores. Once redeemed on the Playfish website, players earn "Playfish Cash" (PFC) to spend on virtual goods in games.

Prior 19 April 2011, all active Playfish games used a uniform premium currency called "Playfish Cash", and among players it was often called PFC. Playfish Cash could be used for all Playfish games in one. Later, the premium currency was changed into individual cash types for each game.

Game	Playfish Cash
Pet Society	Pet Society Cash
Madden NFL Superstars	Football Cash
The Sims Social	SimCash
SimCity Social	Diamonds
NHL Superstars	Hockey Cash

== Marketing ==
In August 2011, Playfish was confirmed as the official shirt sponsor of the newly formed, supporter owned English football club AFC Rushden & Diamonds.
