= List of Electronic Arts games: 2000–2009 =

This is a list of video games published or developed by Electronic Arts. Since 1983 and the 1987 release of its Skate or Die!, it has respectively published and developed games, bundles, as well as a handful of earlier productivity software. Only versions of games developed or published by EA, as well as those versions' years of release, are listed.

Legend
Developed and published by EA
Only developed by EA
Only published by EA
Only distributed by EA

List of released video games
Title	Release date	Platforms	Developer(s)	Ref(s)
Jane's Combat Simulations: F/A-18 Simulator	January 11, 2000	Microsoft Windows	Electronic Arts	
Tiger Woods PGA Tour 2000	January 2000	Game Boy Color	Xantera	
Tiger Woods PGA Tour 2000	February 29, 2000	Microsoft Windows	Rainbow Studios	
Mobil 1 British Rally Championship	January 31, 2000	Microsoft Windows	Magnetic Fields / Creative Asylum Limited	
NASCAR Rumble	January 31, 2000	PlayStation	EA Redwood Shores	
Nox	January 31, 2000	Microsoft Windows	Westwood Pacific	
The Sims	January 31, 2000	Microsoft Windows	Maxis	
The Sims	January 14, 2003	PlayStation 2	Edge of Reality	
The Sims	March 12, 2003	Linux	Maxis	
The Sims	March 25, 2003	GameCube	Edge of Reality	
The Sims	March 25, 2003	Xbox	Edge of Reality	
Road Rash: Jailbreak	February 1, 2000	PlayStation	EA Redwood Shores	
SimMania Pack	February 3, 2000	Microsoft Windows	Electronic Arts	
Sid Meier's Alpha Centauri Planetary Pack	February 15, 2000	Microsoft Windows	Firaxis Games	
Championship Bass	February 29, 2000	PlayStation	Engineering Animation	
Championship Bass	February 29, 2000	Microsoft Windows	Engineering Animation	
Need for Speed: Porsche Unleashed	February 29, 2000	PlayStation	Eden Studios	
Need for Speed: Porsche Unleashed	March 24, 2000	Microsoft Windows	EA Canada	
NASCAR 2000	February 29, 2000	Microsoft Windows	EA Sports / Stormfront Studios	
NASCAR 2000	July 2000	Game Boy Color	Software Creations	
CyberTiger	February 29, 2000	Nintendo 64	Saffire	
CyberTiger	November 10, 2000	Game Boy Color	Xantera	
Superbike 2000	March 1, 2000	PlayStation	Milestone srl	
Superbike 2000	March 10, 2000	Microsoft Windows	Milestone srl	
Mobil 1 British Rally Championship	March 2000	PlayStation	Magnetic Fields / Creative Asylum Limited	
Triple Play 2001	March 14, 2000	PlayStation	Treyarch	
Triple Play 2001	March 25, 2000	Microsoft Windows	Treyarch	
Triple Play 2001	May 8, 2000	Game Boy Color	Handheld Games	
NHL Rock the Rink	March 16, 2000	PlayStation	EA Canada	
Theme Park World	March 20, 2000	PlayStation	Bullfrog Productions / Climax Development	
Theme Park World	December 5, 2000	PlayStation 2	Bullfrog Productions / Climax Development	
Ultimate Hunt Challenge	March 21, 2000	Microsoft Windows	EA Seattle	
Cricket 2000	March 24, 2000	PlayStation	Krisalis Software	
Cricket 2000	March 24, 2000	Microsoft Windows	Krisalis Software	
F1 2000	March 31, 2000	PlayStation	Visual Sciences	
F1 2000	March 31, 2000	Microsoft Windows	Image Space Incorporated	
Ultima Online: Renaissance	April 3, 2000	Microsoft Windows	Origin Systems	
UEFA Euro 2000	April 28, 2000	PlayStation	EA Canada	
UEFA Euro 2000	April 28, 2000	Microsoft Windows	EA Canada	
WCW Mayhem	May 10, 2000	Game Boy Color	2n Productions	
SimCity 3000 Unlimited	May 16, 2000	Microsoft Windows	Maxis	
Shogun: Total War (Note: Shogun: Total War was published with Sold Out.)	June 13, 2000	Microsoft Windows	The Creative Assembly	
Buick PGA Tour Courses	July 6, 2000	Microsoft Windows	Xantera	
NCAA Football 2001	July 25, 2000	PlayStation	EA Sports	
X-Squad	August 3, 2000	PlayStation 2	Electronic Arts Square	
Madden NFL 2001	August 22, 2000	PlayStation	EA Tiburon	
Madden NFL 2001	August 24, 2000	Microsoft Windows	EA Tiburon	
Madden NFL 2001	August 28, 2000	Nintendo 64	EA Tiburon	
Madden NFL 2001	October 26, 2000	PlayStation 2	EA Tiburon	
Madden NFL 2001	November 13, 2000	Game Boy Color	3d6 Games	
The F.A. Premier League Football Manager 2000	August 25, 2000	PlayStation	Krisalis Software	
The Sims: Livin' Large	August 27, 2000	Microsoft Windows	Maxis	
Rugby	September 1, 2000	Microsoft Windows	Creative Assembly	
Rugby	June 15, 2001	PlayStation 2	Creative Assembly	
The F.A. Premier League Football Manager 2001	September 8, 2000	PlayStation	EA UK	
The F.A. Premier League Football Manager 2001	September 8, 2000	Microsoft Windows	EA UK	
The F.A. Premier League Stars 2001	September 8, 2000	PlayStation	EA UK	
The F.A. Premier League Stars 2001	September 8, 2000	Microsoft Windows	EA UK	
The F.A. Premier League Stars 2001	July 13, 2001	Game Boy Color	Krisalis Software / EA Bright Light	
Racing Mania	September 13, 2000	Microsoft Windows	Electronic Arts	
NHL 2001	September 26, 2000	PlayStation	EA Canada	
NHL 2001	September 28, 2000	Microsoft Windows	EA Canada	
NHL 2001	October 25, 2000	PlayStation 2	EA Canada	
Play the Games Vol. 3	September 27, 2000	Microsoft Windows	Eidos Interactive / Infogrames / Electronic Arts	
F1 Championship Season 2000	September 30, 2000	PlayStation	Image Space Incorporated / Visual Sciences	
F1 Championship Season 2000	December 6, 2000	Microsoft Windows	Image Space Incorporated / Visual Sciences	
F1 Championship Season 2000	December 15, 2000	PlayStation 2	Image Space Incorporated / Visual Sciences	
F1 Championship Season 2000	December 19, 2000	Game Boy Color	Image Space Incorporated / Visual Sciences	
Knockout Kings 2001	October 1, 2000	PlayStation	Electronic Arts	
Knockout Kings 2001	February 13, 2001	PlayStation 2	Black Ops Entertainment	
Superbike 2001	October 6, 2000	Microsoft Windows	Milestone srl	
F1 Manager	October 13, 2000	Microsoft Windows	Intelligent Games	
NBA Live 2001	October 16, 2000	PlayStation	EA Sports	
NBA Live 2001	January 22, 2001	PlayStation 2	EA Sports	
NBA Live 2001	February 7, 2001	Microsoft Windows	EA Sports	
007: The World is Not Enough	October 17, 2000	Nintendo 64	Eurocom	
007: The World is Not Enough	September 2001	Game Boy Color	2n Productions	
Command & Conquer: Red Alert 2	October 23, 2000	Microsoft Windows	Westwood Studios	
Medal of Honor: Underground	October 23, 2000	PlayStation	DreamWorks Interactive	
Medal of Honor: Underground	June 11, 2009	PlayStation Network	DreamWorks Interactive	
Kessen (Note: Kessen was published in Japan by Koei.)	October 26, 2000	PlayStation 2	Koei	
Swing Away Golf (Note: The game was self-published in Japan by T&E Soft.)	October 26, 2000	PlayStation 2	T&E Soft	
FIFA Football 2001	October 30, 2000	Microsoft Windows	EA Canada	
FIFA Football 2001	November 8, 2000	PlayStation	EA Canada	
FIFA Football 2001	November 24, 2000	PlayStation 2	EA Canada	
NASCAR 2001	October 30, 2000	PlayStation	Black Box Games	
NASCAR 2001	November 6, 2000	PlayStation 2	EA Sports	
SSX	October 30, 2000	PlayStation 2	EA Canada	
WCW Backstage Assault	October 31, 2000	PlayStation	Kodiak Interactive	
WCW Backstage Assault	December 12, 2000	Nintendo 64	Kodiak Interactive	
Front Office Football 2001	November 1, 2000	Microsoft Windows	Solecismic Software	
Tiger Woods PGA Tour 2001	November 6, 2000	Microsoft Windows	Headgate Studios	
Tiger Woods PGA Tour 2001	November 13, 2000	PlayStation	Stormfront Studios	
Tiger Woods PGA Tour 2001	February 26, 2001	PlayStation 2	EA Redwood Shores	
Delta Force: Land Warrior	November 7, 2000	Microsoft Windows	NovaLogic	
007: The World is Not Enough	November 8, 2000	PlayStation	Black Ops Entertainment	
007 Racing	November 20, 2000	PlayStation	Eutechnyx	
American McGee's Alice	December 6, 2000	Macintosh	Rogue Entertainment	
American McGee's Alice	December 6, 2000	Microsoft Windows	Rogue Entertainment	
Supercross 2001	December 20, 2000	PlayStation	Page 44 Studios	
Aquarium	December 25, 2000	Microsoft Windows	Tose	
The Biggest Names the Best Games 3	2000	Microsoft Windows	Electronic Arts	
EA Sports Mania Pack	2000	Microsoft Windows	Various	
Jane's Combat Simulations: Air Superiority Collection	2000	Microsoft Windows	Electronic Arts	
Jane's Combat Simulations: Naval Warfare Collection	2000	Microsoft Windows	Electronic Arts	
Street Sk8er 2	2000	PlayStation	Atelier Double	
Ultimate Motorcycle Series	2000	Microsoft Windows	Electronic Arts	
Ultimate Sci-Fi Series	2000	Microsoft Windows	Electronic Arts	
Ultima World Edition	2000	Microsoft Windows	Electronic Arts	
Theme Park Inc.	January 29, 2001	Microsoft Windows	Bullfrog Productions / Climax Group	
Electronic Arts Top Ten Pak	February 8, 2001	Microsoft Windows	Various	
Clive Barker's Undying	February 21, 2001	Microsoft Windows	EA Los Angeles	
Clive Barker's Undying	June 11, 2002	Macintosh	EA Los Angeles	
Triple Play Baseball	February 27, 2001	PlayStation	Treyarch	
Triple Play Baseball	March 13, 2001	PlayStation 2	Treyarch	
Triple Play Baseball	March 15, 2001	Microsoft Windows	Treyarch	
Electronic Arts Top Ten Family Fun Pack	March 6, 2001	Microsoft Windows	Various	
Elitserien 2001	March 8, 2001	Microsoft Windows	Electronic Arts	
Adventure Pinball: Forgotten Island	March 21, 2001	Microsoft Windows	Digital Extremes	
Ultima Online: Third Dawn	March 26, 2001	Microsoft Windows	Origin Systems	
Black & White	March 30, 2001	Microsoft Windows	Lionhead Studios	
The Sims: House Party	April 2, 2001	Microsoft Windows	Maxis	
Rumble Racing	April 23, 2001	PlayStation 2	EA Redwood Shores	
Emperor: Battle for Dune	June 12, 2001	Microsoft Windows	Intelligent Games / Westwood Studios	
NBA Street	June 19, 2001	PlayStation 2	EA Canada / NuFX	
NBA Street	February 5, 2002	GameCube	EA Canada / NuFX	
Torrente (Note: This game was published by Electronic Arts in Spain. Other versions were published by O~3 Entertainment, 1C Company and FX Interactive.)	June 21, 2001	Microsoft Windows	Virtual Toys, S.L.	
NCAA Football 2002	July 23, 2001	PlayStation 2	EA Sports	
Majestic	July 31, 2001	Microsoft Windows	Anim-X	
Madden NFL 2002	August 13, 2001	PlayStation	EA Tiburon / Budcat Creations	
Madden NFL 2002	August 19, 2001	PlayStation 2	EA Tiburon / Budcat Creations	
Madden NFL 2002	August 20, 2001	Microsoft Windows	EA Tiburon / Budcat Creations	
Madden NFL 2002	September 2001	Game Boy Color	EA Tiburon / Budcat Creations	
Madden NFL 2002	September 12, 2001	Nintendo 64	EA Tiburon / Budcat Creations	
Madden NFL 2002	October 29, 2001	Xbox	EA Tiburon / Budcat Creations	
Madden NFL 2002	November 17, 2001	GameCube	EA Tiburon / Budcat Creations	
Madden NFL 2002	November 20, 2001	Game Boy Advance	EA Tiburon / Budcat Creations	
Shogun: Total War: Warlord Edition	August 13, 2001	Microsoft Windows	The Creative Assembly	
Shogun: Total War - The Mongol Invasion	August 24, 2001	Microsoft Windows	The Creative Assembly	
Sub Command	September 13, 2001	Microsoft Windows	Sonalysts	
The F.A. Premier League Football Manager 2002	September 14, 2001	Microsoft Windows	EA UK	
NHL 2002	September 17, 2001	Microsoft Windows	EA Canada	
NHL 2002	September 24, 2001	PlayStation 2	EA Canada	
NHL 2002	December 10, 2001	Xbox	EA Canada	
NHL 2002	March 7, 2002	Game Boy Advance	Budcat Creations	
F1 2001	September 28, 2001	Microsoft Windows	Image Space Incorporated	
F1 2001	October 1, 2001	PlayStation 2	EA UK	
F1 2001	November 18, 2001	Xbox	EA UK	
NASCAR Thunder 2002	October 2, 2001	PlayStation	EA Tiburon	
NASCAR Thunder 2002	October 15, 2001	PlayStation 2	EA Tiburon	
NASCAR Thunder 2002	November 15, 2001	Xbox	EA Tiburon	
Command & Conquer: Theater of War	October 5, 2001	DOS	Westwood Studios	
Command & Conquer: Theater of War	October 5, 2001	Microsoft Windows	Westwood Studios	
Command & Conquer: Yuri's Revenge	October 10, 2001	Microsoft Windows	Westwood Studios	
Dark Age of Camelot	October 10, 2001	Microsoft Windows	Mythic Entertainment / Broadsword Online Games	
Pooh and Tigger's Hunny Safari (Note: North American publishing rights only through Electronic Arts Distribution subsidiary. Published by Ubi Soft in Europe.)	October 10, 2001	Game Boy Color	Digital Eclipse	
FIFA Football 2002	October 29, 2001	Microsoft Windows	EA Canada	
FIFA Football 2002	November 1, 2001	PlayStation	EA Canada	
FIFA Football 2002	November 1, 2001	PlayStation 2	EA Canada	
FIFA Football 2002	November 15, 2001	GameCube	EA Canada	
Motor City Online	October 29, 2001	Microsoft Windows	EA Seattle	
NBA Live 2002	October 29, 2001	PlayStation	NuFX	
NBA Live 2002	October 30, 2001	PlayStation 2	EA Canada	
NBA Live 2002	November 15, 2001	Xbox	EA Canada	
Majestic: Special Edition	October 30, 2001	Microsoft Windows	Anim-X	
Play the Games Vol. 4	October 30, 2001	Microsoft Windows	Eidos Interactive / Infogrames / Electronic Arts	
Racing Mania 2	October 30, 2001	Microsoft Windows	Electronic Arts	
SSX Tricky	November 5, 2001	PlayStation 2	EA Canada	
SSX Tricky	December 2, 2001	GameCube	EA Canada	
SSX Tricky	December 10, 2001	Xbox	EA Canada	
SSX Tricky	October 31, 2002	Game Boy Advance	EA Canada	
Comanche 4	November 12, 2001	Microsoft Windows	Novalogic	
007: Agent Under Fire	November 13, 2001	PlayStation 2	EA Redwood Shores	
007: Agent Under Fire	March 12, 2002	GameCube	EA Redwood Shores	
007: Agent Under Fire	March 26, 2002	Xbox	EA Redwood Shores	
Cel Damage	November 14, 2001	Xbox	Pseudo Interactive	
Cel Damage	January 7, 2002	GameCube	Pseudo Interactive	
The Sims: Hot Date	November 14, 2001	Microsoft Windows	Maxis	
Harry Potter and the Sorcerer's Stone	November 15, 2001	Game Boy Advance	Griptonite Games	
Harry Potter and the Sorcerer's Stone	November 15, 2001	Game Boy Color	Griptonite Games	
Harry Potter and the Sorcerer's Stone	November 15, 2001	PlayStation	Argonaut Games	
Harry Potter and the Sorcerer's Stone	November 15, 2001	Microsoft Windows	KnowWonder	
Harry Potter and the Sorcerer's Stone	February 28, 2002	Macintosh	Westlake Entertainment	
Harry Potter and the Sorcerer's Stone	December 9, 2003	GameCube	Warthog Games Limited	
Harry Potter and the Sorcerer's Stone	December 9, 2003	PlayStation 2	Warthog Games Limited	
Harry Potter and the Sorcerer's Stone	December 9, 2003	Xbox	Warthog Games Limited	
The Simpsons: Road Rage (Note: Co-published with Fox Interactive.)	November 24, 2001	PlayStation 2	Radical Entertainment	
The Simpsons: Road Rage	December 1, 2001	Xbox	Radical Entertainment	
The Simpsons: Road Rage	December 17, 2001	GameCube	Radical Entertainment	
Pooh's Party Game: In Search of the Treasure (Note: Co-published with Disney Interactive. Published in Europe by Sony Computer Entertainment.)	November 28, 2001	PlayStation	Doki Denki	
Moto Racer 3 (Note: Co-published with Delphine Software International. Published by Infogrames in North America)	December 7, 2001	Microsoft Windows	Delphine Software International	
Outdoorsman Mania	2001	Microsoft Windows	Inland Productions, Inc.	
Electronic Arts Top Ten Blue	January 10, 2002	Microsoft Windows	Electronic Arts	
Electronic Arts Top Ten Red	January 10, 2002	Microsoft Windows	Electronic Arts	
Black & White: Creature Isle	January 21, 2002	Microsoft Windows	Lionhead Studios	
Medal of Honor: Allied Assault (Note: A version of Medal of Honor: Allied Assault for Mac OS X was published by Aspyr.)	January 22, 2002	Microsoft Windows	2015	
Sid Meier's SimGolf	January 23, 2002	Microsoft Windows	Firaxis Games	
Cricket 2002	February 1, 2002	PlayStation 2	HB Studios	
Cricket 2002	February 1, 2002	Microsoft Windows	HB Studios	
Pirates: The Legend of Black Kat (Note: Released under the full Electronic Arts name.)	February 17, 2002	PlayStation 2	Westwood Studios	
Pirates: The Legend of Black Kat	March 24, 2002	Xbox	Westwood Studios	
Tiger Woods PGA Tour 2002	February 26, 2002	PlayStation 2	EA Redwood Shores	
Tiger Woods PGA Tour 2002	February 26, 2002	Microsoft Windows	Headgate Studios	
Tiger Woods PGA Tour 2002	April 30, 2002	Game Boy Advance	Rebellion Developments	
Ultima Online: Lord Blackthorn's Revenge	February 24, 2002	Microsoft Windows	Origin Systems	
Command & Conquer: Renegade	February 27, 2002	Microsoft Windows	Westwood Studios	
Desert Strike: Return to the Gulf	May 7, 2002	Game Boy Advance	Budcat Creations, LLC.	
Knockout Kings 2002	March 8, 2002	PlayStation 2	Black Ops Entertainment	
Knockout Kings 2002	March 30, 2002	Xbox	Black Ops Entertainment	
Sled Storm	March 11, 2002	PlayStation 2	EA Canada	
Triple Play 2002	March 12, 2002	PlayStation 2	Pandemic Studios	
Triple Play 2002	March 12, 2002	Xbox	Pandemic Studios	
Command & Conquer: Red Strike	March 19, 2002	Microsoft Windows	Westwood Pacific	
Matt Hayes Fishing	March 22, 2002	Microsoft Windows	Electronic Arts Seattle	
Global Operations	March 25, 2002	Microsoft Windows	Barking Dog Studios	
Freedom Force	March 26, 2002	Microsoft Windows	Irrational Games	
SimMania for Kids	March 26, 2002	Microsoft Windows	Maxis	
The Sims: Vacation	March 28, 2002	Microsoft Windows	Maxis	
F1 2002	April 5, 2002	Xbox	Visual Science	
F1 2002	June 7, 2002	PlayStation 2	Image Space Incorporated	
F1 2002	June 7, 2002	Microsoft Windows	Visual Science	
F1 2002	June 22, 2002	GameCube	Visual Science	
F1 2002	December 18, 2002	Game Boy Advance	Image Space Incorporated	
2002 FIFA World Cup	April 22, 2002	PlayStation 2	EA Canada / Creations / Intelligent Games	
2002 FIFA World Cup	April 22, 2002	Xbox	EA Canada / Creations / Intelligent Games	
2002 FIFA World Cup	April 26, 2002	PlayStation	EA Canada / Creations / Intelligent Games	
2002 FIFA World Cup	April 26, 2002	Microsoft Windows	EA Canada / Creations / Intelligent Games	
2002 FIFA World Cup	April 30, 2002	GameCube	EA Canada / Creations / Tose Software	
Sid Meier's Civil War Collection	May 22, 2002	Microsoft Windows	Firaxis Games / BreakAway Games	
Medal of Honor: Frontline	May 29, 2002	PlayStation 2	EA Los Angeles	
Medal of Honor: Frontline	November 7, 2002	GameCube	EA Los Angeles	
Medal of Honor: Frontline	November 7, 2002	Xbox	EA Los Angeles	
Freekstyle	June 17, 2002	PlayStation 2	EA Redwood Shores / Page 44 Studios	
Freekstyle	September 5, 2002	GameCube	EA Redwood Shores / Page 44 Studios / Hypnos Entertainment	
Football Mania (Note: Co-published with Lego Interactive.)	June 18, 2002	PlayStation 2	Silicon Dreams Studio	
Football Mania	June 18, 2002	Microsoft Windows	Silicon Dreams Studio	
Football Mania	June 18, 2002	Game Boy Advance	Tiertex Design Studios	
NCAA Football 2003	July 20, 2002	GameCube	EA Tiburon	
NCAA Football 2003	July 20, 2002	PlayStation 2	EA Tiburon	
NCAA Football 2003	July 20, 2002	Xbox	EA Tiburon	
Madden NFL 2003	August 12, 2002	Game Boy Advance	EA Tiburon / Budcat Creations	
Madden NFL 2003	August 12, 2002	GameCube	EA Tiburon / Budcat Creations	
Madden NFL 2003	August 12, 2002	PlayStation	EA Tiburon / Budcat Creations	
Madden NFL 2003	August 12, 2002	PlayStation 2	EA Tiburon / Budcat Creations	
Madden NFL 2003	August 12, 2002	Microsoft Windows	EA Tiburon / Budcat Creations	
Madden NFL 2003	August 12, 2002	Xbox	EA Tiburon / Budcat Creations	
Buffy the Vampire Slayer (Note: Co-published with Fox Interactive.)	August 18, 2002	Xbox	The Collective	
Battlefield 1942	September 10, 2002	Microsoft Windows	Digital Illusions CE	
NASCAR Thunder 2003	September 19, 2002	GameCube	EA Sports / Budcat Creations	
NASCAR Thunder 2003	September 19, 2002	PlayStation	EA Sports / Budcat Creations	
NASCAR Thunder 2003	September 19, 2002	Xbox	EA Sports / Budcat Creations	
NASCAR Thunder 2003	September 29, 2002	PlayStation 2	EA Sports / Budcat Creations	
NASCAR Thunder 2003	October 16, 2002	Microsoft Windows	Image Space Incorporated	
Total Club Manager 2003	September 20, 2002	Microsoft Windows	Electronic Arts	
Shox	September 23, 2002	PlayStation 2	EA UK	
Earth & Beyond	September 24, 2002	Microsoft Windows	Westwood Studios	
NHL 2003	September 30, 2002	GameCube	EA Canada	
NHL 2003	September 30, 2002	PlayStation 2	EA Canada	
NHL 2003	September 30, 2002	Microsoft Windows	EA Canada	
NHL 2003	October 9, 2002	Xbox	EA Canada	
Need for Speed: Hot Pursuit 2	October 2, 2002	GameCube	EA Seattle	
Need for Speed: Hot Pursuit 2	October 2, 2002	PlayStation 2	EA Black Box	
Need for Speed: Hot Pursuit 2	October 2, 2002	Xbox	EA Seattle	
Need for Speed: Hot Pursuit 2	October 21, 2002	Microsoft Windows	EA Seattle	
NBA Live 2003	October 8, 2002	GameCube	EA Canada	
NBA Live 2003	October 8, 2002	PlayStation	NuFX	
NBA Live 2003	October 8, 2002	PlayStation 2	EA Canada	
NBA Live 2003	October 8, 2002	Xbox	EA Canada	
NBA Live 2003	November 14, 2002	Microsoft Windows	EA Canada	
Knockout Kings 2003	October 9, 2002	GameCube	GameFlow Entertainment, LLC / Electronic Arts Redwood Shores Studio	
Disney Golf (Note: Co-published with Disney Interactive. Published in Japan by Capcom.)	October 15, 2002	PlayStation 2	T&E Soft	
The Lord of the Rings: The Two Towers	October 21, 2002	PlayStation 2	Stormfront Studios	
The Lord of the Rings: The Two Towers	November 8, 2002	Game Boy Advance	Griptonite Games	
The Lord of the Rings: The Two Towers	December 30, 2002	Xbox	Stormfront Studios	
The Lord of the Rings: The Two Towers	December 31, 2002	GameCube	Hypnos Entertainment	
The Lord of the Rings: The Two Towers	May 1, 2003	Mobile phones	JAMDAT	
Ty the Tasmanian Tiger	October 9, 2002	GameCube	Krome Studios	
Ty the Tasmanian Tiger	October 9, 2002	PlayStation 2	Krome Studios	
Ty the Tasmanian Tiger	October 9, 2002	Xbox	Krome Studios	
1503 A.D.: The New World	October 25, 2002	Microsoft Windows	Max Design	
Tiger Woods PGA Tour 2003	October 27, 2002	GameCube	EA Redwood Shores	
Tiger Woods PGA Tour 2003	October 27, 2002	PlayStation 2	EA Redwood Shores	
Tiger Woods PGA Tour 2003	October 27, 2002	Xbox	EA Redwood Shores	
Tiger Woods PGA Tour 2003	October 31, 2002	Microsoft Windows	Headgate Studios	
Galidor: Defenders of the Outer Dimension (Note: Co-published with Lego Interactive.)	October 29, 2002	Game Boy Advance	Tiertex Design Studios	
Bionicle: Matoran Adventures (Note: Co-published with Lego Interactive.)	November 1, 2002	Game Boy Advance	Argonaut Games	
FIFA Football 2003	November 2, 2002	Microsoft Windows	EA Canada	
FIFA Football 2003	November 11, 2002	PlayStation	EA Canada	
FIFA Football 2003	November 12, 2002	Xbox	EA Canada	
FIFA Football 2003	November 14, 2002	GameCube	EA Canada	
FIFA Football 2003	November 14, 2002	PlayStation 2	EA Canada	
FIFA Football 2003	November 15, 2002	Game Boy Advance	Exient Entertainment	
FIFA Football 2003	August 27, 2003	Mobile phones	EA Canada	
Harry Potter and the Chamber of Secrets	November 5, 2002	Game Boy Advance	Eurocom	
Harry Potter and the Chamber of Secrets	November 5, 2002	Game Boy Color	Griptonite Games	
Harry Potter and the Chamber of Secrets	November 5, 2002	GameCube	Eurocom	
Harry Potter and the Chamber of Secrets	November 5, 2002	PlayStation	Argonaut Games	
Harry Potter and the Chamber of Secrets	November 5, 2002	PlayStation 2	EA UK	
Harry Potter and the Chamber of Secrets	November 5, 2002	Microsoft Windows	KnowWonder	
Harry Potter and the Chamber of Secrets	November 5, 2002	Xbox	Eurocom	
Harry Potter and the Chamber of Secrets	April 10, 2003	Macintosh	Aspyr	
The Sims: Unleashed	November 7, 2002	Microsoft Windows	Maxis	
Medal of Honor: Allied Assault – Spearhead	November 12, 2002	Microsoft Windows	EA Los Angeles	
The Simpsons Skateboarding (Note: Co-published with Fox Interactive.)	November 12, 2002	PlayStation 2	The Code Monkeys	
Island Xtreme Stunts (Note: Co-published with Lego Interactive.)	November 15, 2002	Game Boy Advance	Silicon Dreams Studio	
Island Xtreme Stunts	November 30, 2002	PlayStation 2	Silicon Dreams Studio	
Island Xtreme Stunts	November 30, 2002	Microsoft Windows	Silicon Dreams Studio	
007: Nightfire	November 18, 2002	GameCube	Eurocom	
007: Nightfire	November 18, 2002	PlayStation 2	Eurocom	
007: Nightfire	November 18, 2002	Xbox	Eurocom	
007: Nightfire	November 28, 2002	Microsoft Windows	Gearbox Software	
007: Nightfire	March 18, 2003	Game Boy Advance	JV Games	
007: Nightfire	June 21, 2004	Macintosh	Aspyr	
Drome Racers (Note: Co-published with Lego Interactive.)	November 20, 2002	PlayStation 2	Attention to Detail	
Drome Racers	December 6, 2002	Microsoft Windows	Attention to Detail	
Drome Racers	September 16, 2003	GameCube	Attention to Detail	
Creator: Harry Potter and the Chamber of Secrets (Note: Co-published with Lego Interactive.)	December 1, 2002	Microsoft Windows	Qube Software	
The Sims Online	December 17, 2002	Microsoft Windows	Maxis	
V8 Challenge	2002	Microsoft Windows	Digital Illusions CE	
SimCity 4	January 14, 2003	Microsoft Windows	Maxis	
Battlefield 1942: The Road to Rome	February 2, 2003	Microsoft Windows	Digital Illusions CE	
Command & Conquer: Generals	February 10, 2003	Microsoft Windows	EA Pacific	
Command & Conquer: Generals	March 12, 2005	Macintosh	EA Pacific	
Ultima Online: Age of Shadows	February 11, 2003	Microsoft Windows	Origin Systems	
Dead to Rights (Note: Co-published in PAL-region territories with Namco Europe.)	February 21, 2003	Xbox	Namco Hometek	
Dead to Rights	August 22, 2003	PlayStation 2	Namco Hometek	
Dead to Rights	August 22, 2003	GameCube	Namco Hometek	
Best of EA Sports	March 11, 2003	Microsoft Windows	Electronic Arts	
MVP Baseball 2003	March 11, 2003	PlayStation 2	EA Canada	
MVP Baseball 2003	March 11, 2003	Microsoft Windows	EA Canada	
MVP Baseball 2003	March 11, 2003	Xbox	EA Canada	
Gamers Pack	March 20, 2003	Microsoft Windows	Electronic Arts	
Pac-Man World 2 (Note: Co-published in PAL-region territories with Namco Europe. The PlayStation 2 version was co-published by Sony Computer Entertainment.)	March 21, 2003	GameCube	Namco Hometek	
SimMania 2	March 24, 2003	Microsoft Windows	Electronic Arts	
Disney's Stitch: Experiment 626 (Note: This game was published by Electronic Arts in Japan only for the PlayStation, while other versions were published by Disney Interactive and Sony Computer Entertainment.)	March 27, 2003	PlayStation 2	High Voltage Software	
Def Jam Vendetta	April 1, 2003	GameCube	AKI Corporation / EA Canada	
Def Jam Vendetta	April 1, 2003	PlayStation 2	AKI Corporation / EA Canada	
NBA Street Vol. 2	April 29, 2003	GameCube	EA Canada	
NBA Street Vol. 2	April 29, 2003	PlayStation 2	EA Canada	
NBA Street Vol. 2	April 29, 2003	Xbox	EA Canada	
The Sims: Superstar	May 13, 2003	Microsoft Windows	Maxis	
F1 Career Challenge	June 24, 2003	GameCube	Visual Science	
F1 Career Challenge	June 24, 2003	PlayStation 2	Visual Science	
F1 Career Challenge	June 24, 2003	Xbox	Visual Science	
F1 Challenge '99-'02	June 24, 2003	Microsoft Windows	Visual Science	
Tiger Woods PGA Tour 2004	July 14, 2003	Mobile phone	EA Redwood Shores	
Tiger Woods PGA Tour 2004	September 22, 2003	GameCube	EA Redwood Shores	
Tiger Woods PGA Tour 2004	September 22, 2003	PlayStation 2	EA Redwood Shores	
Tiger Woods PGA Tour 2004	September 22, 2003	Microsoft Windows	Headgate Studios	
Tiger Woods PGA Tour 2004	September 22, 2003	Xbox	EA Redwood Shores	
Tiger Woods PGA Tour 2004	November 4, 2003	Game Boy Advance	Backbone Emeryville	
Tiger Woods PGA Tour 2004	June 24, 2004	N-Gage	Backbone Emeryville	
NCAA Football 2004	July 16, 2003	GameCube	EA Tiburon	
NCAA Football 2004	July 16, 2003	PlayStation 2	EA Tiburon	
NCAA Football 2004	July 16, 2003	Xbox	EA Tiburon	
Aliens Versus Predator: Extinction (Note: Co-published with Fox Interactive.)	July 30, 2003	PlayStation 2	Zono	
Aliens Versus Predator: Extinction	July 30, 2003	Xbox	Zono	
Madden NFL 2004	August 12, 2003	Game Boy Advance	Budcat	
Madden NFL 2004	August 12, 2003	GameCube	EA Tiburon	
Madden NFL 2004	August 12, 2003	PlayStation	Budcat	
Madden NFL 2004	August 12, 2003	PlayStation 2	EA Tiburon	
Madden NFL 2004	August 12, 2003	Microsoft Windows	EA Tiburon	
Madden NFL 2004	August 12, 2003	Xbox	EA Tiburon	
Bionicle (Note: Co-published with Lego Interactive.)	September 1, 2003	GameCube	Argonaut Games / Argonaut Sheffield	
Bionicle	October 10, 2003	PlayStation 2	Argonaut Games / Argonaut Sheffield	
Bionicle	October 17, 2003	Xbox	Argonaut Games / Argonaut Sheffield	
Bionicle	October 31, 2003	Microsoft Windows	Argonaut Games / Argonaut Sheffield	
The Movie Collection	September 2, 2003	Microsoft Windows	Electronic Arts	
Battlefield 1942: Secret Weapons of WWII	September 4, 2003	Microsoft Windows	Digital Illusions CE	
Disney's Party (Note: Co-published with Disney Interactive.)	September 16, 2003	Game Boy Advance	Jupiter Corporation	
Disney's Party	September 16, 2003	GameCube	Hudson Soft	
NASCAR Thunder 2004	September 16, 2003	PlayStation	Budcat Creations	
NASCAR Thunder 2004	September 16, 2003	PlayStation 2	EA Tiburon	
NASCAR Thunder 2004	September 16, 2003	Microsoft Windows	Image Space Incorporated	
NASCAR Thunder 2004	September 16, 2003	Xbox	EA Tiburon	
Rugby 2004	September 16, 2003	PlayStation 2	HB Studios	
Rugby 2004	November 4, 2003	Microsoft Windows	HB Studios	
Command & Conquer: Generals – Zero Hour	September 22, 2003	Microsoft Windows	EA Los Angeles	
Command & Conquer: Generals – Zero Hour	February 2005	Macintosh	EA Los Angeles	
Medal of Honor: Allied Assault – Breakthrough	September 22, 2003	Microsoft Windows	TKO Software	
NHL 2004	September 22, 2003	GameCube	EA Black Box	
NHL 2004	September 22, 2003	PlayStation 2	EA Black Box	
NHL 2004	September 22, 2003	Microsoft Windows	EA Black Box	
NHL 2004	September 22, 2003	Xbox	EA Black Box	
SimCity 4: Rush Hour	September 22, 2003	Microsoft Windows	Maxis	
Freedom Fighters	September 26, 2003	GameCube	IO Interactive	
Freedom Fighters	September 26, 2003	PlayStation 2	IO Interactive	
Freedom Fighters	September 26, 2003	Microsoft Windows	IO Interactive	
Freedom Fighters	September 26, 2003	Xbox	IO Interactive	
Soulcalibur II (Note: Co-published in PAL-region territories with Namco Europe. The GameCube version was co-published by Nintendo of Europe.)	September 26, 2003	Xbox	Namco	
Soulcalibur II	September 26, 2003	PlayStation 2	Namco	
The Command & Conquer Collection	October 14, 2003	Microsoft Windows	Westwood Studios	
The Laptop Collection	October 14, 2003	Microsoft Windows	Electronic Arts	
NBA Live 2004	October 14, 2003	PlayStation 2	EA Canada	
NBA Live 2004	October 14, 2003	Xbox	EA Canada	
NBA Live 2004	October 15, 2003	GameCube	EA Canada	
NBA Live 2004	November 11, 2003	Microsoft Windows	EA Canada	
The Need for Speed Collection	October 14, 2003	Microsoft Windows	EA Black Box	
Battlefield 1942: Deluxe Edition	October 20, 2003	Microsoft Windows	Digital Illusions CE	
SSX 3	October 20, 2003	GameCube	EA Canada	
SSX 3	October 20, 2003	PlayStation 2	EA Canada	
SSX 3	October 20, 2003	Xbox	EA Canada	
SSX 3	November 11, 2003	Game Boy Advance	Visual Impact	
SSX 3	August 31, 2005	Gizmondo	Exient Entertainment	
FIFA Football 2004	October 24, 2003	PlayStation	EA Canada	
FIFA Football 2004	October 24, 2003	PlayStation 2	EA Canada	
FIFA Football 2004	October 24, 2003	Xbox	EA Canada	
FIFA Football 2004	November 4, 2003	Game Boy Advance	Exient Entertainment	
FIFA Football 2004	November 4, 2003	GameCube	EA Canada	
FIFA Football 2004	November 4, 2003	Microsoft Windows	EA Canada	
FIFA Football 2004	December 24, 2003	N-Gage	Exient Entertainment	
FIFA Football 2004	August 13, 2004	Mobile phones	EA Canada	
Harry Potter: Quidditch World Cup	October 28, 2003	Game Boy Advance	Magic Pockets	
Harry Potter: Quidditch World Cup	October 28, 2003	GameCube	EA UK	
Harry Potter: Quidditch World Cup	October 28, 2003	PlayStation 2	EA UK	
Harry Potter: Quidditch World Cup	October 28, 2003	Microsoft Windows	EA UK	
Harry Potter: Quidditch World Cup	October 28, 2003	Xbox	EA UK	
The Sims: Makin' Magic	October 29, 2003	Microsoft Windows	Maxis	
The Lord of the Rings: The Return of the King	November 3, 2003	Microsoft Windows	EA Redwood Shores	
The Lord of the Rings: The Return of the King	November 4, 2003	PlayStation 2	EA Redwood Shores	
The Lord of the Rings: The Return of the King	November 5, 2003	Game Boy Advance	Griptonite Games	
The Lord of the Rings: The Return of the King	November 5, 2003	GameCube	Hypnos Entertainment	
The Lord of the Rings: The Return of the King	November 5, 2003	Xbox	Hypnos Entertainment	
The Lord of the Rings: The Return of the King	December 1, 2003	Mobile phones	JAMDAT	
The Lord of the Rings: The Return of the King	April 10, 2004	Macintosh	Beenox	
Looney Tunes: Back in Action (Note: Co-published with Warner Bros. Interactive Entertainment.)	November 11, 2003	Game Boy Advance	Warthog Games	
Looney Tunes: Back in Action	November 19, 2003	PlayStation 2	Warthog Games	
Looney Tunes: Back in Action	November 24, 2003	GameCube	Warthog Games	
Medal of Honor: Rising Sun	November 11, 2003	GameCube	EA Los Angeles	
Medal of Honor: Rising Sun	November 11, 2003	PlayStation 2	EA Los Angeles	
Medal of Honor: Rising Sun	November 11, 2003	Xbox	EA Los Angeles	
007: Everything or Nothing	November 17, 2003	Game Boy Advance	Griptonite Games	
007: Everything or Nothing	February 17, 2004	GameCube	EA Redwood Shores	
007: Everything or Nothing	February 17, 2004	PlayStation 2	EA Redwood Shores	
007: Everything or Nothing	February 17, 2004	Xbox	EA Redwood Shores	
Medal of Honor: Infiltrator	November 17, 2003	Game Boy Advance	Netherock Ltd.	
Need for Speed: Underground	November 17, 2003	GameCube	Pocketeers	
Need for Speed: Underground	November 17, 2003	PlayStation 2	EA Black Box	
Need for Speed: Underground	November 17, 2003	Microsoft Windows	EA Black Box	
Need for Speed: Underground	November 17, 2003	Xbox	EA Black Box	
Need for Speed: Underground	December 17, 2003	Game Boy Advance	EA Black Box	
The Sim Collection	November 17, 2003	Microsoft Windows	Maxis	
Total Club Manager 2004	November 28, 2003	Microsoft Windows	Electronic Arts	
Total Club Manager 2004	December 5, 2003	Xbox	Budcat Creations	
Total Club Manager 2004	December 12, 2003	PlayStation 2	Budcat Creations	
Ghosthunter (Note: Ghosthunter was published by Electronic Arts in Japan only.)	December 5, 2003	PlayStation 2	SCE Cambridge Studio	
The Sims Bustin' Out	December 16, 2003	Game Boy Advance	Griptonite Games	
The Sims Bustin' Out	December 16, 2003	GameCube	Maxis	
The Sims Bustin' Out	December 16, 2003	PlayStation 2	Maxis	
The Sims Bustin' Out	December 16, 2003	Xbox	Maxis	
The Sims Bustin' Out	May 10, 2004	N-Gage	Ideaworks3D	
NFL Street	January 13, 2004	GameCube	EA Tiburon	
NFL Street	January 13, 2004	PlayStation 2	EA Tiburon	
NFL Street	January 13, 2004	Xbox	EA Tiburon	
Final Fantasy X-2 (Note: Co-published with Square Enix Europe.)	February 20, 2004	PlayStation 2	Square Product Development Division 1	
Cricket 2004	March 5, 2004	PlayStation 2	HB Studios	
Cricket 2004	March 12, 2004	Microsoft Windows	HB Studios	
MVP Baseball 2004	March 9, 2004	GameCube	EA Canada	
MVP Baseball 2004	March 9, 2004	PlayStation 2	EA Canada	
MVP Baseball 2004	March 9, 2004	Microsoft Windows	EA Canada	
MVP Baseball 2004	March 9, 2004	Xbox	EA Canada	
Spawn: Armageddon (Note: Co-published in PAL-region territories with Namco Europe.)	March 12, 2004	Xbox	Point of View	
Spawn: Armageddon	March 12, 2004	PlayStation 2	Point of View	
Spawn: Armageddon	March 12, 2004	GameCube	Point of View	
Battlefield Vietnam	March 14, 2004	Microsoft Windows	DICE Canada	
R: Racing (Note: Co-published in PAL-region territories with Namco Europe.)	April 2, 2004	Xbox	Namco	
R: Racing	April 2, 2004	PlayStation 2	Namco	
R: Racing	April 2, 2004	GameCube	Namco	
Fight Night 2004	April 5, 2004	PlayStation 2	EA Canada / NuFX	
Fight Night 2004	April 5, 2004	Xbox	EA Canada / NuFX	
Anno 1503: Treasures, Monsters and Pirates	April 15, 2004	Microsoft Windows	Max Design	
UEFA Euro 2004	May 4, 2004	PlayStation 2	EA Canada	
UEFA Euro 2004	May 4, 2004	Microsoft Windows	EA Canada	
UEFA Euro 2004	May 4, 2004	Xbox	EA Canada	
The Vault of Darkness	May 11, 2004	Microsoft Windows	Electronic Arts	
Battlefield 1942: World War II Anthology	May 17, 2004	Microsoft Windows	Digital Illusions CE	
Harry Potter and the Prisoner of Azkaban	May 25, 2004	Game Boy Advance	Griptonite Games	
Harry Potter and the Prisoner of Azkaban	May 25, 2004	Microsoft Windows	KnowWonder	
Harry Potter and the Prisoner of Azkaban	May 29, 2004	GameCube	EA UK	
Harry Potter and the Prisoner of Azkaban	May 29, 2004	PlayStation 2	EA UK	
Harry Potter and the Prisoner of Azkaban	May 29, 2004	Xbox	EA UK	
The Sims: Mega Deluxe	May 25, 2004	Microsoft Windows	Maxis	
The Sims: Triple Deluxe	June 15, 2004	Microsoft Windows	Maxis	
Breakdown (Note: Co-published in PAL-region territories with Namco Europe.)	June 18, 2004	Xbox	Namco	
NCAA Football 2005	July 15, 2004	GameCube	EA Tiburon	
NCAA Football 2005	July 15, 2004	PlayStation 2	EA Tiburon	
NCAA Football 2005	July 15, 2004	Xbox	EA Tiburon	
Catwoman	July 20, 2004	Game Boy Advance	Magic Pockets	
Catwoman	July 20, 2004	GameCube	Argonaut Games	
Catwoman	July 20, 2004	PlayStation 2	Argonaut Games	
Catwoman	July 20, 2004	Microsoft Windows	Argonaut Games	
Catwoman	July 20, 2004	Xbox	Argonaut Games	
Madden NFL 2005	August 9, 2004	Game Boy Advance	Exient Entertainment	
Madden NFL 2005	August 9, 2004	GameCube	EA Tiburon	
Madden NFL 2005	August 9, 2004	PlayStation 2	EA Tiburon	
Madden NFL 2005	August 9, 2004	Xbox	EA Tiburon	
Madden NFL 2005	September 7, 2004	PlayStation	EA Tiburon	
Madden NFL 2005	September 14, 2004	Microsoft Windows	Budcat Creations	
Madden NFL 2005	November 17, 2004	Nintendo DS	Exient Entertainment	
Madden NFL 2005 (Collector's Edition)	August 9, 2004	PlayStation 2	EA Tiburon	
NASCAR 2005: Chase for the Cup	August 31, 2004	GameCube	EA Tiburon	
NASCAR 2005: Chase for the Cup	September 4, 2004	PlayStation 2	EA Tiburon	
NASCAR 2005: Chase for the Cup	September 4, 2004	Xbox	EA Tiburon	
EA Games Collection	September 1, 2004	Microsoft Windows	Electronic Arts	
Burnout 3: Takedown	September 8, 2004	PlayStation 2	Criterion Games	
Burnout 3: Takedown	September 8, 2004	Xbox	Criterion Games	
Burnout 3: Takedown	January 14, 2008	Xbox Live Arcade	Criterion Games	
NHL 2005	September 14, 2004	Microsoft Windows	EA Black Box	
NHL 2005	September 20, 2004	GameCube	EA Black Box	
NHL 2005	September 20, 2004	PlayStation 2	EA Black Box	
NHL 2005	September 20, 2004	Xbox	EA Black Box	
The Sims 2	September 14, 2004	Microsoft Windows	Maxis Redwood Shores	
The Sims 2	October 24, 2005	Game Boy Advance	Amaze Entertainment	
The Sims 2	October 24, 2005	GameCube	Maxis Redwood Shores	
The Sims 2	October 24, 2005	Nintendo DS	Amaze Entertainment	
The Sims 2	October 24, 2005	PlayStation 2	Maxis Redwood Shores	
The Sims 2	October 24, 2005	Xbox	Maxis Redwood Shores	
The Sims 2	November 25, 2005	Java ME	Amaze Entertainment	
The Sims 2	November 25, 2005	Mobile phones	Amaze Entertainment	
The Sims 2	December 7, 2005	PlayStation Portable	Amaze Entertainment	
Tiger Woods PGA Tour 2005	September 20, 2004	GameCube	EA Redwood Shores	
Tiger Woods PGA Tour 2005	September 20, 2004	PlayStation 2	EA Redwood Shores	
Tiger Woods PGA Tour 2005	September 20, 2004	Microsoft Windows	Headgate Studios	
Tiger Woods PGA Tour 2005	September 20, 2004	Xbox	EA Redwood Shores	
Tiger Woods PGA Tour 2005	December 14, 2004	Nintendo DS	Sensory Sweep Studios	
Tiger Woods PGA Tour 2005	March 23, 2005	PlayStation Portable	EA Canada	
Def Jam: Fight for NY	September 21, 2004	GameCube	AKI Corporation / EA Canada	
Def Jam: Fight for NY	September 21, 2004	PlayStation 2	AKI Corporation / EA Canada	
Def Jam: Fight for NY	September 21, 2004	Xbox	AKI Corporation / EA Canada	
NBA Live 2005	September 28, 2004	GameCube	EA Canada	
NBA Live 2005	September 28, 2004	PlayStation 2	EA Canada	
NBA Live 2005	September 28, 2004	Xbox	EA Canada	
NBA Live 2005	October 26, 2004	Microsoft Windows	EA Canada	
Knights of Honor (Note: European Distribution rights only, published by Sunflowers Interactive.)	September 30, 2004	Microsoft Windows	Black Sea Studios	
FIFA Football 2005	October 8, 2004	Game Boy Advance	Exient Entertainment	
FIFA Football 2005	October 8, 2004	GameCube	EA Canada	
FIFA Football 2005	October 8, 2004	PlayStation 2	EA Canada	
FIFA Football 2005	October 8, 2004	Microsoft Windows	EA Canada	
FIFA Football 2005	October 8, 2004	Xbox	EA Canada	
FIFA Football 2005	October 23, 2004	Mobile phones	EA Canada	
FIFA Football 2005	October 27, 2004	N-Gage	Exient Entertainment	
FIFA Football 2005	April 25, 2005	PlayStation Portable	EA Canada	
FIFA Football 2005	September 15, 2005	Gizmondo	EA Canada	
Ty the Tasmanian Tiger 2: Bush Rescue	October 12, 2004	Game Boy Advance	Halfbrick Studios	
Ty the Tasmanian Tiger 2: Bush Rescue	October 12, 2004	GameCube	Krome Studios	
Ty the Tasmanian Tiger 2: Bush Rescue	October 12, 2004	PlayStation 2	Krome Studios	
Ty the Tasmanian Tiger 2: Bush Rescue	October 12, 2004	Xbox	Krome Studios	
Total Club Manager 2005	October 22, 2004	Microsoft Windows	Electronic Arts	
Total Club Manager 2005	October 29, 2004	PlayStation 2	Budcat Creations	
Total Club Manager 2005	October 29, 2004	Xbox	Budcat Creations	
The Lord of the Rings: The Third Age	November 2, 2004	GameCube	EA Redwood Shores	
The Lord of the Rings: The Third Age	November 2, 2004	PlayStation 2	EA Redwood Shores	
The Lord of the Rings: The Third Age	November 2, 2004	Xbox	EA Redwood Shores	
The Lord of the Rings: The Third Age (Game Boy Advance)	November 2, 2004	Game Boy Advance	Griptonite Games	
Ultima Online: Samurai Empire	November 2, 2004	Microsoft Windows	Origin Systems	
Medal of Honor: Pacific Assault	November 4, 2004	Microsoft Windows	EA Los Angeles	
Medal of Honor: Pacific Assault (Director's Edition DVD)	November 4, 2004	Microsoft Windows	EA Los Angeles	
Need for Speed: Underground 2	November 9, 2004	Microsoft Windows	EA Black Box	
Need for Speed: Underground 2	November 15, 2004	Game Boy Advance	Pocketeers	
Need for Speed: Underground 2	November 15, 2004	GameCube	EA Black Box	
Need for Speed: Underground 2	November 15, 2004	PlayStation 2	EA Black Box	
Need for Speed: Underground 2	November 15, 2004	Xbox	EA Black Box	
Need for Speed: Underground 2	May 10, 2005	Nintendo DS	EA Black Box	
Need for Speed: Underground 2	July 15, 2005	Mobile phones	EA Black Box	
The Urbz: Sims in the City	November 9, 2004	GameCube	Maxis	
The Urbz: Sims in the City	November 9, 2004	PlayStation 2	Maxis	
The Urbz: Sims in the City	November 9, 2004	Xbox	Maxis	
The Urbz: Sims in the City	November 17, 2004	Game Boy Advance	Griptonite Games	
The Urbz: Sims in the City	November 17, 2004	Nintendo DS	Griptonite Games	
GoldenEye: Rogue Agent	November 22, 2004	GameCube	EA Los Angeles	
GoldenEye: Rogue Agent	November 22, 2004	PlayStation 2	EA Los Angeles	
GoldenEye: Rogue Agent	November 22, 2004	Xbox	EA Los Angeles	
GoldenEye: Rogue Agent	June 13, 2005	Nintendo DS	EA Tiburon / n-Space	
Armies of Exigo (Note: Armies of Exigo was published by Cinergi Interactive.)	November 30, 2004	Microsoft Windows	Black Hole Entertainment	
The Lord of the Rings: The Battle for Middle-earth	December 6, 2004	Microsoft Windows	EA Los Angeles	
NFL Street 2	December 22, 2004	GameCube	EA Tiburon	
NFL Street 2	December 22, 2004	PlayStation 2	EA Tiburon	
NFL Street 2	December 22, 2004	Xbox	EA Tiburon	
Black & White Deluxe	December 31, 2004	Microsoft Windows	Lionhead Studios	
SSX: Out of Bounds	January 24, 2005	Gizmondo	Exient Entertainment	
SSX: Out of Bounds	January 24, 2005	N-Gage	Exient Entertainment	
Oddworld: Stranger's Wrath	January 25, 2005	Xbox	Oddworld Inhabitants	
UEFA Champions League 2004–2005	February 3, 2005	GameCube	EA Canada	
UEFA Champions League 2004–2005	February 3, 2005	PlayStation 2	EA Canada	
UEFA Champions League 2004–2005	February 3, 2005	Microsoft Windows	EA Canada	
UEFA Champions League 2004–2005	February 3, 2005	Xbox	EA Canada	
FIFA Street	February 22, 2005	GameCube	EA Canada	
FIFA Street	February 22, 2005	PlayStation 2	EA Canada	
FIFA Street	February 22, 2005	Xbox	EA Canada	
NBA Street V3	February 8, 2005	GameCube	EA Canada	
NBA Street V3	February 8, 2005	PlayStation 2	EA Canada	
NBA Street V3	February 8, 2005	PlayStation Portable	EA Canada	
NBA Street V3	February 8, 2005	Xbox	EA Canada	
NASCAR SimRacing	February 15, 2005	Microsoft Windows	EA Tiburon	
MVP Baseball 2005	February 22, 2005	GameCube	EA Canada	
MVP Baseball 2005	February 22, 2005	PlayStation 2	EA Canada	
MVP Baseball 2005	February 22, 2005	Microsoft Windows	EA Canada	
MVP Baseball 2005	February 22, 2005	Xbox	EA Canada	
MVP Baseball 2005	May 18, 2005	PlayStation Portable	EA Canada	
Fight Night Round 2	February 28, 2005	GameCube	EA Chicago	
Fight Night Round 2	February 28, 2005	PlayStation 2	EA Chicago	
Fight Night Round 2	February 28, 2005	Xbox	EA Chicago	
The Sims 2: University	March 1, 2005	Microsoft Windows	Maxis Redwood Shores	
Rugby 2005	March 8, 2005	PlayStation 2	EA Canada	
Rugby 2005	March 8, 2005	Microsoft Windows	EA Canada	
Rugby 2005	March 8, 2005	Xbox	EA Canada	
Need for Speed: Underground Rivals	March 14, 2005	PlayStation Portable	EA Black Box	
The Sims Expansion Collection: Volume One	March 15, 2005	Microsoft Windows	Maxis	
The Sims Expansion Collection: Volume Three	March 15, 2005	Microsoft Windows	Maxis	
The Sims Expansion Collection: Volume Two	March 15, 2005	Microsoft Windows	Maxis	
NFL Street 2 Unleashed	March 21, 2005	PlayStation Portable	EA Tiburon	
TimeSplitters: Future Perfect	March 21, 2005	GameCube	Free Radical Design	
TimeSplitters: Future Perfect	March 21, 2005	PlayStation 2	Free Radical Design	
TimeSplitters: Future Perfect	March 21, 2005	Xbox	Free Radical Design	
NBA Street Showdown	April 27, 2005	PlayStation Portable	Team Fusion	
Surviving High School	April 30, 2005	Mobile phones	Centerscore / EA Mobile	
Surviving High School	January 28, 2009	Windows Mobile	Centerscore / EA Mobile	
Surviving High School	November 16, 2009	iOS	Centerscore / EA Mobile	
Medal of Honor: European Assault	June 7, 2005	GameCube	EA Los Angeles	
Medal of Honor: European Assault	June 7, 2005	PlayStation 2	EA Los Angeles	
Medal of Honor: European Assault	June 7, 2005	Xbox	EA Los Angeles	
Batman Begins	June 14, 2005	Game Boy Advance	Vicarious Visions	
Batman Begins	June 14, 2005	GameCube	Eurocom	
Batman Begins	June 14, 2005	PlayStation 2	Eurocom	
Batman Begins	June 14, 2005	Xbox	Eurocom	
Battlefield 2	June 21, 2005	Microsoft Windows	Digital Illusions CE	
SimMania 3	June 21, 2005	Microsoft Windows	Electronic Arts	
Cricket 2005	July 1, 2005	PlayStation 2	HB Studios	
Cricket 2005	July 1, 2005	Microsoft Windows	HB Studios	
Cricket 2005	July 1, 2005	Xbox	HB Studios	
NCAA Football 06	July 11, 2005	PlayStation 2	EA Tiburon	
NCAA Football 06	July 11, 2005	Xbox	EA Tiburon	
Madden NFL 06	August 8, 2005	Game Boy Advance	Exient Entertainment	
Madden NFL 06	August 8, 2005	GameCube	EA Tiburon	
Madden NFL 06	August 8, 2005	Nintendo DS	Exient Entertainment	
Madden NFL 06	August 8, 2005	PlayStation 2	EA Tiburon	
Madden NFL 06	August 8, 2005	Xbox	EA Tiburon	
Madden NFL 06	August 11, 2005	Mobile phones	EA Tiburon	
Madden NFL 06	August 17, 2005	Microsoft Windows	Budcat Creations	
Madden NFL 06	September 20, 2005	PlayStation Portable	EA Tiburon	
Madden NFL 06	November 16, 2005	Xbox 360	EA Tiburon	
NASCAR 06: Total Team Control	August 30, 2005	PlayStation 2	EA Tiburon	
NASCAR 06: Total Team Control	August 30, 2005	Xbox	EA Tiburon	
Ultima Online: Mondain's Legacy	August 30, 2005	Microsoft Windows	Electronic Arts	
NHL 06	September 6, 2005	GameCube	EA Tiburon	
NHL 06	September 6, 2005	PlayStation 2	EA Tiburon	
NHL 06	September 6, 2005	Microsoft Windows	EA Tiburon	
NHL 06	September 6, 2005	Xbox	EA Tiburon	
Burnout Legends	September 13, 2005	PlayStation Portable	Criterion Games	
Burnout Legends	November 20, 2005	Nintendo DS	Criterion Games	
Burnout Revenge	September 13, 2005	PlayStation 2	Criterion Games	
Burnout Revenge	September 13, 2005	Xbox	Criterion Games	
Burnout Revenge	March 7, 2006	Xbox 360	Criterion Games	
The Sims 2: Nightlife	September 13, 2005	Microsoft Windows	Maxis Redwood Shores	
Marvel Nemesis: Rise of the Imperfects	September 20, 2005	GameCube	Nihilistic Software	
Marvel Nemesis: Rise of the Imperfects	September 20, 2005	PlayStation 2	Nihilistic Software	
Marvel Nemesis: Rise of the Imperfects	September 20, 2005	Xbox	Nihilistic Software	
Marvel Nemesis: Rise of the Imperfects	October 4, 2005	PlayStation Portable	EA Canada	
Marvel Nemesis: Rise of the Imperfects	November 11, 2005	Nintendo DS	Nihilistic Software	
Tiger Woods PGA Tour 06	September 20, 2005	GameCube	EA Redwood Shores	
Tiger Woods PGA Tour 06	September 20, 2005	PlayStation 2	EA Redwood Shores	
Tiger Woods PGA Tour 06	September 20, 2005	Microsoft Windows	Headgate Studios	
Tiger Woods PGA Tour 06	September 20, 2005	Xbox	EA Redwood Shores	
Tiger Woods PGA Tour 06	September 26, 2005	PlayStation Portable	Team Fusion	
Tiger Woods PGA Tour 06	November 22, 2005	Xbox 360	EA Redwood Shores	
Tiger Woods PGA Tour 06	2005	Mobile phones	EA Redwood Shores	
FIFA 06	September 30, 2005	Game Boy Advance	Exient Entertainment	
FIFA 06	September 30, 2005	GameCube	EA Canada	
FIFA 06	September 30, 2005	Nintendo DS	Exient Entertainment	
FIFA 06	September 30, 2005	PlayStation 2	EA Canada	
FIFA 06	September 30, 2005	Microsoft Windows	EA Canada	
FIFA 06	September 30, 2005	Xbox	EA Canada	
FIFA 06	October 11, 2005	PlayStation Portable	EA Canada	
FIFA 06	2005	Mobile phones	EA Canada	
Black & White 2	October 4, 2005	Microsoft Windows	Lionhead Studios	
FIFA Manager 06	October 7, 2005	Microsoft Windows	EA Canada	
NBA Live 06	October 11, 2005	BREW	EA Canada	
NBA Live 06	October 11, 2005	GameCube	EA Canada	
NBA Live 06	October 11, 2005	Mobile phones	EA Canada	
NBA Live 06	October 11, 2005	PlayStation 2	EA Canada	
NBA Live 06	October 11, 2005	PlayStation Portable	EA Canada	
NBA Live 06	October 11, 2005	Microsoft Windows	EA Canada	
NBA Live 06	October 11, 2005	Xbox	EA Canada	
NBA Live 06	October 11, 2005	Xbox 360	EA Canada	
SSX on Tour	October 11, 2005	GameCube	EA Canada	
SSX on Tour	October 11, 2005	PlayStation 2	EA Canada	
SSX on Tour	October 11, 2005	PlayStation Portable	EA Montreal	
SSX on Tour	October 11, 2005	Xbox	EA Canada	
Battlefield 2: Modern Combat	October 24, 2005	PlayStation 2	Digital Illusions CE	
Battlefield 2: Modern Combat	October 24, 2005	Xbox	Digital Illusions CE	
Battlefield 2: Modern Combat	April 11, 2006	Xbox 360	Digital Illusions CE	
Dead to Rights II (Note: Co-published in PAL-region territories with Namco Europe.)	October 28, 2005	Xbox	Widescreen Games	
Dead to Rights II	October 28, 2005	PlayStation 2	Widescreen Games	
007: From Russia with Love	November 1, 2005	PlayStation 2	EA Redwood Shores	
007: From Russia with Love	November 1, 2005	Xbox	EA Redwood Shores	
007: From Russia with Love	November 15, 2005	GameCube	EA Redwood Shores	
007: From Russia with Love	April 3, 2006	PlayStation Portable	Rebellion Developments	
The Sims: Expansion Three-Pack Volume 1	November 1, 2005	Microsoft Windows	Maxis	
The Sims: Expansion Three-Pack Volume 2	November 1, 2005	Microsoft Windows	Maxis	
The Sims: Complete Collection	November 1, 2005	Microsoft Windows	Maxis	
Harry Potter and the Goblet of Fire	November 8, 2005	Game Boy Advance	Magic Pockets	
Harry Potter and the Goblet of Fire	November 8, 2005	GameCube	EA UK	
Harry Potter and the Goblet of Fire	November 8, 2005	Nintendo DS	Magic Pockets	
Harry Potter and the Goblet of Fire	November 8, 2005	PlayStation 2	EA UK	
Harry Potter and the Goblet of Fire	November 8, 2005	Microsoft Windows	EA UK	
Harry Potter and the Goblet of Fire	November 8, 2005	Xbox	EA UK	
Harry Potter and the Goblet of Fire	November 15, 2005	PlayStation Portable	EA UK	
The Lord of the Rings: Tactics	November 8, 2005	PlayStation Portable	Amaze Entertainment	
Need for Speed: Most Wanted	November 11, 2005	Nintendo DS	EA Canada / EA Black Box	
Need for Speed: Most Wanted	November 15, 2005	Game Boy Advance	EA Canada / EA Black Box	
Need for Speed: Most Wanted	November 15, 2005	GameCube	EA Canada / EA Black Box	
Need for Speed: Most Wanted	November 15, 2005	Mobile phones	EA Canada / EA Black Box	
Need for Speed: Most Wanted	November 15, 2005	PlayStation 2	EA Canada / EA Black Box	
Need for Speed: Most Wanted	November 15, 2005	Microsoft Windows	EA Canada / EA Black Box	
Need for Speed: Most Wanted	November 15, 2005	Xbox	EA Canada / EA Black Box	
Need for Speed: Most Wanted	November 22, 2005	Xbox 360	EA Canada / EA Black Box	
Need for Speed: Most Wanted (Black Edition)	November 15, 2005	PlayStation 2	EA Canada / EA Black Box	
Need for Speed: Most Wanted (Black Edition)	November 15, 2005	Microsoft Windows	EA Canada / EA Black Box	
Need for Speed: Most Wanted (Black Edition)	November 15, 2005	Xbox	EA Canada / EA Black Box	
Need for Speed: Most Wanted: 5-1-0	November 15, 2005	PlayStation Portable	EA Canada / EA Black Box	
The Sims 2: Holiday Edition	November 15, 2005	Microsoft Windows	Maxis Redwood Shores	
The Sims 2 Stuff packs	November 17, 2005–November 17, 2008	Microsoft Windows	Maxis Redwood Shores	
Battlefield 2: Special Forces	November 22, 2005	Microsoft Windows	Digital Illusions CE	
FIFA 06: Road to FIFA World Cup	November 22, 2005	Xbox 360	EA Canada	
MVP 06: NCAA Baseball	January 18, 2006	PlayStation 2	EA Canada	
MVP 06: NCAA Baseball	January 18, 2006	Xbox	EA Canada	
We Love Katamari (Note: Co-published in PAL-region territories with Namco Europe.)	February 3, 2006	PlayStation 2	Namco	
Arena Football	February 7, 2006	PlayStation 2	Electronic Arts	
Arena Football	February 7, 2006	Xbox	Electronic Arts	
Command & Conquer: The First Decade	February 7, 2006	Microsoft Windows	EA Los Angeles / Barking Lizards Technologies / Base Camp Films / Gametap Entertainment / Westwood Studios	
Rugby 06	February 10, 2006	PlayStation 2	EA Canada / HB Studios	
Rugby 06	February 10, 2006	Microsoft Windows	EA Canada / HB Studios	
Rugby 06	February 10, 2006	Xbox	EA Canada / HB Studios	
Fight Night Round 3	February 20, 2006	PlayStation 2	EA Chicago	
Fight Night Round 3	February 20, 2006	PlayStation Portable	EA Chicago	
Fight Night Round 3	February 20, 2006	Xbox	EA Chicago	
Fight Night Round 3	February 20, 2006	Xbox 360	EA Chicago	
Fight Night Round 3	November 30, 2006	Mobile phones	EA Chicago	
Fight Night Round 3	December 5, 2006	PlayStation 3	EA Chicago	
Black	February 24, 2006	PlayStation 2	Criterion Games	
Black	February 24, 2006	Xbox	Criterion Games	
FIFA Street 2	February 28, 2006	GameCube	EA Canada	
FIFA Street 2	February 28, 2006	Mobile phones	EA Canada	
FIFA Street 2	February 28, 2006	Nintendo DS	Exient Entertainment	
FIFA Street 2	February 28, 2006	PlayStation 2	EA Canada	
FIFA Street 2	February 28, 2006	PlayStation Portable	EA Canada	
FIFA Street 2	February 28, 2006	Xbox	EA Canada	
The Lord of the Rings: The Battle for Middle-earth II	February 28, 2006	Microsoft Windows	EA Los Angeles	
The Lord of the Rings: The Battle for Middle-earth II	July 5, 2006	Xbox 360	EA Los Angeles	
The Sims 2: Open for Business	March 2, 2006	Microsoft Windows	Maxis Redwood Shores	
The Godfather: The Game	March 21, 2006	PlayStation 2	Page 44 Studios	
The Godfather: The Game	March 21, 2006	Microsoft Windows	Headgate Studios	
The Godfather: The Game	March 21, 2006	Xbox	Page 44 Studios	
The Godfather: The Game	September 19, 2006	PlayStation Portable	Page 44 Studios	
The Godfather: The Game	September 19, 2006	Xbox 360	EA Redwood Shores	
The Godfather: The Game	March 21, 2007	PlayStation 3	EA Redwood Shores	
The Godfather: The Game	March 21, 2007	Wii	EA Redwood Shores	
Namco Museum: 50th Anniversary (Note: Co-published in PAL-region territories with Namco Europe.)	March 31, 2006	Xbox	Digital Eclipse	
Namco Museum: 50th Anniversary	March 31, 2006	Game Boy Advance	Digital Eclipse	
Namco Museum: 50th Anniversary	March 31, 2006	PlayStation 2	Digital Eclipse	
Namco Museum: 50th Anniversary	May 19, 2006	Microsoft Windows	Digital Eclipse	
Namco Museum: 50th Anniversary	June 9, 2006	GameCube	Digital Eclipse	
Pac-Man World 3 (Note: Co-published in PAL-region territories with Namco Europe.)	May 5, 2006	Xbox	Blitz Games	
Pac-Man World 3	May 5, 2006	PlayStation 2	Blitz Games	
Pac-Man World 3	May 5, 2006	Nintendo DS	Human Soft, Inc.	
Pac-Man World 3	May 9, 2006	PlayStation Portable	Blitz Games	
Pac-Man World 3	June 23, 2006	GameCube	Blitz Games	
Pac-Man World 3	July 23, 2006	Microsoft Windows	Blitz Games	
Me & My Katamari (Note: Co-published in PAL-region territories with Namco Europe.)	May 12, 2006	PlayStation Portable	Namco	
Madden NFL 07	August 22, 2006	Game Boy Advance	Exient Entertainment	
Madden NFL 07	August 22, 2006	GameCube	EA Tiburon / EA Canada	
Madden NFL 07	August 22, 2006	Mobile phones	EA Tiburon / EA Canada	
Madden NFL 07	August 22, 2006	Nintendo DS	Exient Entertainment	
Madden NFL 07	August 22, 2006	PlayStation 2	EA Tiburon / EA Canada	
Madden NFL 07	August 22, 2006	PlayStation Portable	EA Tiburon / EA Canada	
Madden NFL 07	August 22, 2006	Microsoft Windows	EA Tiburon / EA Canada	
Madden NFL 07	August 22, 2006	Xbox	EA Tiburon / EA Canada	
Madden NFL 07	August 22, 2006	Xbox 360	EA Tiburon / EA Canada	
Madden NFL 07	November 14, 2006	PlayStation 3	EA Tiburon / EA Canada	
Madden NFL 07	November 14, 2006	Wii	HB Studios	
2006 FIFA World Cup	April 24, 2006	Game Boy Advance	Exient Entertainment	
2006 FIFA World Cup	April 24, 2006	GameCube	EA Canada	
2006 FIFA World Cup	April 24, 2006	Nintendo DS	Exient Entertainment	
2006 FIFA World Cup	April 24, 2006	PlayStation 2		
2006 FIFA World Cup	April 24, 2006	PlayStation Portable	Exient Entertainment	
2006 FIFA World Cup	April 24, 2006	Microsoft Windows	EA Canada	
2006 FIFA World Cup	April 24, 2006	Xbox	EA Canada	
2006 FIFA World Cup	April 24, 2006	Xbox 360	EA Canada	
2006 FIFA World Cup	May 18, 2006	Mobile phones	EA Canada	
Black & White 2: Battle of the Gods	April 24, 2006	Microsoft Windows	Lionhead Studios	
Sin Episodes: Emergence	May 10, 2006	Macintosh	Ritual Entertainment	
Sin Episodes: Emergence	May 10, 2006	Microsoft Windows	Ritual Entertainment	
NFL Head Coach	June 20, 2006	PlayStation 2	EA Tiburon	
NFL Head Coach	June 20, 2006	Xbox	EA Tiburon	
NFL Head Coach	June 20, 2006	Microsoft Windows	EA Tiburon	
NCAA Football 07	July 18, 2006	PlayStation 2	EA Tiburon	
NCAA Football 07	July 18, 2006	PlayStation Portable	EA Tiburon	
NCAA Football 07	July 18, 2006	Xbox	EA Tiburon	
NCAA Football 07	July 18, 2006	Xbox 360	EA Tiburon	
Def Jam Fight for NY: The Takeover	August 29, 2006	PlayStation Portable	AKI Corporation / EA Canada	
NASCAR 07	September 6, 2006	PlayStation 2	EA Tiburon	
NASCAR 07	September 6, 2006	PlayStation Portable	Exient Entertainment	
NASCAR 07	September 6, 2006	Xbox 360	EA Tiburon	
NHL 07	September 12, 2006	PlayStation 2	EA Montreal	
NHL 07	September 12, 2006	PlayStation Portable	EA Canada	
NHL 07	September 12, 2006	Microsoft Windows	EA Montreal	
NHL 07	September 12, 2006	Xbox	EA Montreal	
NHL 07	September 12, 2006	Xbox 360	EA Canada	
Tiger Woods PGA Tour 07	September 21, 2006	PlayStation 2	Headgate Studios	
Tiger Woods PGA Tour 07	September 21, 2006	Microsoft Windows	EA Redwood Shores	
Tiger Woods PGA Tour 07	September 21, 2006	Xbox	EA Redwood Shores	
Tiger Woods PGA Tour 07	September 22, 2006	PlayStation Portable	Team Fusion	
Tiger Woods PGA Tour 07	October 17, 2006	Xbox 360	Hypnos Entertainment	
Tiger Woods PGA Tour 07	November 21, 2006	PlayStation 3	Hypnos Entertainment	
Tiger Woods PGA Tour 07	March 13, 2007	Wii	EA Redwood Shores	
FIFA 07	September 25, 2006	GameCube	EA Canada	
FIFA 07	September 25, 2006	Nintendo DS	Exient Entertainment	
FIFA 07	September 25, 2006	PlayStation 2	EA Canada	
FIFA 07	September 25, 2006	PlayStation Portable	EA Canada	
FIFA 07	September 25, 2006	Microsoft Windows	EA Canada	
FIFA 07	September 25, 2006	Xbox	EA Canada	
FIFA 07	September 27, 2006	Xbox 360	EA Canada	
FIFA 07	September 29, 2006	Game Boy Advance	Exient Entertainment	
NBA Live 07	September 25, 2006	Mobile phones	EA Canada	
NBA Live 07	September 25, 2006	PlayStation 2	EA Canada	
NBA Live 07	September 25, 2006	PlayStation Portable	EA Canada	
NBA Live 07	September 25, 2006	Microsoft Windows	EA Canada	
NBA Live 07	September 25, 2006	Xbox	EA Canada	
NBA Live 07	September 25, 2006	Xbox 360	EA Canada	
Battlefield 2142	October 17, 2006	Microsoft Windows	EA DICE	
Battlefield 2142	August 17, 2007	Macintosh	EA DICE	
The Sims 2: Pets	October 17, 2006	GameCube	EA Redwood Shores	
The Sims 2: Pets	October 17, 2006	Nintendo DS	Full Fat	
The Sims 2: Pets	October 17, 2006	PlayStation 2	EA Redwood Shores	
The Sims 2: Pets	October 17, 2006	Microsoft Windows	Maxis Redwood Shores	
The Sims 2: Pets	November 7, 2006	Game Boy Advance	Artificial Mind & Movement	
The Sims 2: Pets	December 14, 2006	PlayStation Portable	EA Redwood Shores	
The Sims 2: Pets	June 12, 2007	Wii	EA Redwood Shores	
Medal of Honor: Heroes	October 20, 2006	PlayStation Portable	Team Fusion	
Need for Speed: Carbon	October 30, 2006	GameCube	EA Canada	
Need for Speed: Carbon	October 30, 2006	Mobile phones	Rovio Mobile	
Need for Speed: Carbon	October 30, 2006	PlayStation 2	EA Canada	
Need for Speed: Carbon	October 30, 2006	Microsoft Windows	EA Black Box	
Need for Speed: Carbon	October 30, 2006	Xbox	EA Canada	
Need for Speed: Carbon	October 30, 2006	Xbox 360	EA Canada	
Need for Speed: Carbon	November 16, 2006	PlayStation 3	EA Canada	
Need for Speed: Carbon	November 19, 2006	Wii	EA Canada	
Need for Speed: Carbon	August 17, 2007	Macintosh	EA Black Box	
Need for Speed Carbon: Own the City	October 30, 2006	Game Boy Advance	EA Canada	
Need for Speed Carbon: Own the City	October 30, 2006	Nintendo DS	EA Canada	
Need for Speed Carbon: Own the City	October 30, 2006	PlayStation Portable	EA Canada	
Need for Speed Carbon: Own the City	October 30, 2006	Zeebo	EA Canada	
FIFA Manager 07	November 3, 2006	Microsoft Windows	Bright Future	
Cricket 07	November 14, 2006	PlayStation 2	HB Studios	
Cricket 07	November 14, 2006	Microsoft Windows	HB Studios	
EA Replay	November 14, 2006	PlayStation Portable	EA Canada	
Need for Speed Collector's Series	November 14, 2006	PlayStation 2	Electronic Arts	
NFL Street 3	November 14, 2006	PlayStation 2	EA Tiburon	
NFL Street 3	November 14, 2006	PlayStation Portable	EA Tiburon	
Superman Returns: Fortress of Solitude	November 20, 2006	Game Boy Advance	Santa Cruz Games / EA Tiburon	
Superman Returns	November 22, 2006	Nintendo DS	EA Tiburon	
Superman Returns	November 22, 2006	PlayStation 2	EA Tiburon	
Superman Returns	November 22, 2006	Xbox	EA Tiburon	
Superman Returns	November 22, 2006	Xbox 360	EA Tiburon	
The Lord of the Rings: The Battle for Middle-earth II: The Rise of the Witch-king	November 28, 2006	Microsoft Windows	EA Los Angeles / BreakAway Games	
Curious George (Note: Co-published in PAL-region territories with Namco Bandai Games Europe.)	December 1, 2006	Game Boy Advance	Torus Games	
Curious George	December 1, 2006	PlayStation 2	Monkey Bar Games	
FIFA Online 2	2006	Microsoft Windows	EA Singapore / Neowiz Games	
PGA Tour Golf Team Challenge	2006	Arcade	Global VR / Electronic Arts	
MVP 07: NCAA Baseball	February 6, 2007	PlayStation 2	EA Canada	
The Sims Life Stories	February 6, 2007	Microsoft Windows	Maxis Redwood Shores	
NBA Street Homecourt	February 20, 2007	Xbox 360	EA Black Box	
NBA Street Homecourt	March 6, 2007	PlayStation 3	EA Black Box	
Arena Football: Road to Glory	February 21, 2007	PlayStation 2	EA Tiburon / Budcat Creations	
SSX Blur	February 27, 2007	Wii	EA Montreal	
The Sims 2: Seasons	March 1, 2007	Microsoft Windows	Maxis Redwood Shores	
Burnout Dominator	March 6, 2007	PlayStation 2	EA UK	
Burnout Dominator	March 6, 2007	PlayStation Portable	EA UK	
Def Jam: Icon	March 6, 2007	PlayStation 3	EA Chicago	
Def Jam: Icon	March 6, 2007	Xbox 360	EA Chicago	
Battlefield 2142: Northern Strike	March 8, 2007	Macintosh	EA DICE	
Battlefield 2142: Northern Strike	March 8, 2007	Microsoft Windows	EA DICE	
The Fast and the Furious (Note: Co-published in PAL-region territories with Namco Bandai Games Europe.)	March 9, 2007	PlayStation 2	Eutechnyx	
Theme Park	March 15, 2007	Nintendo DS	EA Japan	
Pac-Man Rally (Note: Co-published in PAL-region territories with Namco Bandai Games Europe.)	March 16, 2007	PlayStation 2	Smart Bomb Interactive	
UEFA Champions League 2006–2007	March 20, 2007	PlayStation 2	EA Canada	
UEFA Champions League 2006–2007	March 20, 2007	Xbox 360	EA Canada	
Command & Conquer 3: Tiberium Wars	March 26, 2007	Microsoft Windows	EA Los Angeles	
Command & Conquer 3: Tiberium Wars	May 10, 2007	Xbox 360	EA Los Angeles	
Command & Conquer 3: Tiberium Wars	August 28, 2007	Macintosh	EA Los Angeles	
Medal of Honor: Vanguard	March 26, 2007	PlayStation 2	EA Los Angeles	
Medal of Honor: Vanguard	March 26, 2007	Wii	Budcat Creations	
Pogo Island	March 26, 2007	Nintendo DS	Pogo.com / Electronic Arts	
Boom Boom Rocket	April 11, 2007	Xbox Live Arcade	Bizarre Creations	
The Sims Pet Stories	June 19, 2007	Microsoft Windows	Maxis Redwood Shores	
Harry Potter and the Order of the Phoenix	June 25, 2007	Nintendo DS	EA UK	
Harry Potter and the Order of the Phoenix	June 25, 2007	PlayStation 2	EA UK	
Harry Potter and the Order of the Phoenix	June 25, 2007	PlayStation 3	EA UK	
Harry Potter and the Order of the Phoenix	June 25, 2007	PlayStation Portable	EA UK	
Harry Potter and the Order of the Phoenix	June 25, 2007	Wii	EA UK	
Harry Potter and the Order of the Phoenix	June 25, 2007	Microsoft Windows	EA UK	
Harry Potter and the Order of the Phoenix	June 25, 2007	Xbox 360	EA UK	
Harry Potter and the Order of the Phoenix	July 10, 2007	Game Boy Advance	EA UK	
Harry Potter and the Order of the Phoenix	August 17, 2007	Macintosh	EA UK	
Harry Potter and the Order of the Phoenix	2008	Mobile Phone	EA UK	
NCAA Football 08	July 17, 2007	PlayStation 2	EA Tiburon	
NCAA Football 08	July 17, 2007	PlayStation 3	EA Tiburon	
NCAA Football 08	July 17, 2007	Xbox	EA Tiburon	
NCAA Football 08	July 17, 2007	Xbox 360	EA Tiburon	
Rugby 08	July 17, 2007	PlayStation 2	HB Studios	
Rugby 08	July 17, 2007	Microsoft Windows	HB Studios	
NASCAR 08	July 23, 2007	PlayStation 2	EA Tiburon	
NASCAR 08	July 23, 2007	PlayStation 3	EA Tiburon	
NASCAR 08	July 23, 2007	Xbox 360	EA Tiburon	
Wing Commander Arena	July 25, 2007	Xbox 360	Gaia Industries	
EA Sports NASCAR Racing	August 3, 2007	Arcade	EA Tiburon	
Boogie	August 9, 2007	Wii	EA Montreal	
Boogie	November 12, 2007	PlayStation 2	EA Montreal	
Boogie	November 27, 2007	Nintendo DS	EA Montreal	
Madden NFL 08	August 14, 2007	GameCube	EA Tiburon	
Madden NFL 08	August 14, 2007	Mobile phones	EA Tiburon	
Madden NFL 08	August 14, 2007	Nintendo DS	Exient Entertainment	
Madden NFL 08	August 14, 2007	PlayStation 2	EA Tiburon	
Madden NFL 08	August 14, 2007	PlayStation 3	EA Tiburon	
Madden NFL 08	August 14, 2007	PlayStation Portable	EA Tiburon	
Madden NFL 08	August 14, 2007	Wii	EA Tiburon	
Madden NFL 08	August 14, 2007	Microsoft Windows	EA Tiburon	
Madden NFL 08	August 14, 2007	Xbox	EA Tiburon	
Madden NFL 08	August 14, 2007	Xbox 360	EA Tiburon	
Madden NFL 08	September 1, 2007	Macintosh	EA Tiburon	
Ultima Online: Kingdom Reborn	August 27, 2007	Microsoft Windows	Electronic Arts	
Medal of Honor: Airborne	August 28, 2007	Mobile phones	EA Los Angeles	
Medal of Honor: Airborne	September 4, 2007	Microsoft Windows	EA Los Angeles	
Medal of Honor: Airborne	September 4, 2007	Xbox 360	EA Los Angeles	
Medal of Honor: Airborne	November 16, 2007	PlayStation 3	EA Los Angeles	
Tiger Woods PGA Tour 08	August 28, 2007	Nintendo DS	Exient Entertainment	
Tiger Woods PGA Tour 08	August 28, 2007	PlayStation 2	EA Salt Lake	
Tiger Woods PGA Tour 08	August 28, 2007	PlayStation 3	EA Tiburon	
Tiger Woods PGA Tour 08	August 28, 2007	PlayStation Portable	EA Tiburon	
Tiger Woods PGA Tour 08	August 28, 2007	Wii	EA Salt Lake	
Tiger Woods PGA Tour 08	August 28, 2007	Microsoft Windows	EA Salt Lake	
Tiger Woods PGA Tour 08	August 28, 2007	Xbox 360	EA Tiburon	
Tiger Woods PGA Tour 08	September 1, 2007	Macintosh	EA Tiburon	
The Sims 2: Bon Voyage	September 4, 2007	Microsoft Windows	Maxis Redwood Shores	
NHL 08	September 11, 2007	PlayStation 2	HB Studios	
NHL 08	September 11, 2007	PlayStation 3	EA Canada	
NHL 08	September 11, 2007	Microsoft Windows	HB Studios	
NHL 08	September 12, 2007	Xbox 360	EA Canada	
Skate	September 13, 2007	Mobile phones	EA Black Box	
Skate	September 14, 2007	Xbox 360	EA Black Box	
Skate	September 24, 2007	PlayStation 3	EA Black Box	
MySims	September 18, 2007	Wii	EA Redwood Shores	
MySims	September 18, 2007	Nintendo DS	TOSE	
MySims	October 28, 2008	Microsoft Windows	EA Redwood Shores	
FIFA 08	September 27, 2007	Java ME	EA Canada	
FIFA 08	September 27, 2007	N-Gage 2	EA Canada	
FIFA 08	September 27, 2007	Nintendo DS	EA Canada	
FIFA 08	September 27, 2007	PlayStation 2	EA Canada	
FIFA 08	September 27, 2007	PlayStation 3	EA Canada	
FIFA 08	September 27, 2007	PlayStation Portable	EA Canada	
FIFA 08	September 27, 2007	Wii	EA Canada	
FIFA 08	September 27, 2007	Microsoft Windows	EA Canada	
FIFA 08	September 27, 2007	Xbox 360	EA Canada	
FIFA 08	September 27, 2007	Zeebo	EA Canada	
NBA Live 08	October 1, 2007	PlayStation 2	HB Studios	
NBA Live 08	October 1, 2007	PlayStation 3	EA Canada	
NBA Live 08	October 1, 2007	PlayStation Portable	HB Studios	
NBA Live 08	October 1, 2007	Wii	HB Studios	
NBA Live 08	October 1, 2007	Xbox 360	EA Canada	
NBA Live 08	October 25, 2007	Microsoft Windows	HB Studios	
The Orange Box	October 10, 2007	Xbox 360	Valve	
The Orange Box	October 10, 2007	Microsoft Windows	Valve	
The Orange Box	November 22, 2007	PlayStation 3	EA UK	
Rail Simulator	October 12, 2007	Microsoft Windows	Kuju Entertainment	
The Sims 2: Castaway	October 22, 2007	Nintendo DS	Full Fat	
The Sims 2: Castaway	October 22, 2007	PlayStation 2	EA Redwood Shores	
The Sims 2: Castaway	October 22, 2007	PlayStation Portable	EA Redwood Shores	
The Sims 2: Castaway	October 22, 2007	Wii	EA Redwood Shores	
EA Playground	October 23, 2007	Nintendo DS	EA Canada	
EA Playground	October 23, 2007	Wii	EA Canada	
EA Sports GameShow	October 23, 2007	Microsoft Windows	EA Tiburon	
Command & Conquer: Saga	October 29, 2007	Microsoft Windows	EA Los Angeles	
The Simpsons Game	October 30, 2007	Nintendo DS	Griptonite Games	
The Simpsons Game	October 30, 2007	PlayStation 2	Rebellion Developments	
The Simpsons Game	October 30, 2007	PlayStation 3	EA Redwood Shores	
The Simpsons Game	October 30, 2007	Wii	Rebellion Developments	
The Simpsons Game	October 30, 2007	Xbox 360	EA Redwood Shores	
The Simpsons Game	November 5, 2007	PlayStation Portable	Rebellion Developments	
Hellgate: London	October 31, 2007	Microsoft Windows	Flagship Studios	
FIFA Manager 08	November 2, 2007	Microsoft Windows	Bright Future	
Medal of Honor: Heroes 2	November 13, 2007	PlayStation Portable	EA Los Angeles	
Medal of Honor: Heroes 2	November 13, 2007	Wii	EA Canada	
SimCity Societies	November 13, 2007	Microsoft Windows	Tilted Mill Entertainment	
Crysis	November 13, 2007	Microsoft Windows	Crytek	
Need for Speed: ProStreet	November 14, 2007	Nintendo DS	EA Black Box	
Need for Speed: ProStreet	November 14, 2007	PlayStation 2	EA Black Box	
Need for Speed: ProStreet	November 14, 2007	PlayStation 3	EA Black Box	
Need for Speed: ProStreet	November 14, 2007	Wii	EA Black Box	
Need for Speed: ProStreet	November 14, 2007	Microsoft Windows	EA Black Box	
Need for Speed: ProStreet	November 14, 2007	Windows Mobile	EA Black Box	
Need for Speed: ProStreet	November 14, 2007	Xbox 360	EA Black Box	
Need for Speed: ProStreet	February 18, 2008	PlayStation Portable	EA Black Box	
Rock Band	November 20, 2007	PlayStation 3	Harmonix / MTV Games	
Rock Band	November 20, 2007	Xbox 360	Harmonix / MTV Games	
Rock Band	December 17, 2007	PlayStation 2	Pi Studios / MTV Games	
Rock Band	June 22, 2008	Wii	Pi Studios / MTV Games	
Boulder Dash: Rocks!	November 23, 2007	Nintendo DS	10tacle Mobile GMBH	
Boulder Dash: Rocks!	March 28, 2008	PlayStation Portable	10tacle Mobile GMBH	
Skate or Die!	December 21, 2007	Virtual Console	Electronic Arts	
NFL Tour	January 8, 2008	PlayStation 3	EA Tiburon	
NFL Tour	January 8, 2008	Xbox 360	EA Tiburon	
Battlefield 2142 Deluxe Edition	January 15, 2008	Macintosh	EA DICE	
Battlefield 2142 Deluxe Edition	January 15, 2008	Microsoft Windows	EA DICE	
Burnout Paradise	January 22, 2008	PlayStation 3	Criterion Games	
Burnout Paradise	January 22, 2008	Microsoft Windows	Criterion Games	
Burnout Paradise	January 22, 2008	Xbox 360	Criterion Games	
The Sims Castaway Stories	January 29, 2008	Microsoft Windows	Maxis Redwood Shores	
Yahtzee	February 16, 2008	iOS	Electronic Arts	
FIFA Street 3	February 18, 2008	Nintendo DS	Exient Entertainment	
FIFA Street 3	February 18, 2008	PlayStation 3	EA Canada	
FIFA Street 3	February 18, 2008	Xbox 360	EA Canada	
The Sims 2: FreeTime	February 22, 2008	Microsoft Windows	Maxis Redwood Shores	
Ninja Reflex	March 4, 2008	Nintendo DS	Sanzaru Games	
Ninja Reflex	March 4, 2008	Wii	Sanzaru Games	
Ninja Reflex	March 4, 2008	Microsoft Windows	Sanzaru Games	
Army of Two	March 6, 2008	PlayStation 3	EA Montreal	
Army of Two	March 6, 2008	Xbox 360	EA Montreal	
Command & Conquer 3: Kane's Wrath	March 24, 2008	Microsoft Windows	EA Los Angeles / BreakAway Games	
Command & Conquer 3: Kane's Wrath	June 23, 2008	Xbox 360	EA Los Angeles / BreakAway Games	
Yahtzee Adventures	April 2, 2008	iOS	EA Mobile	
Command & Conquer 3: Deluxe Edition	April 9, 2008	Microsoft Windows	EA Los Angeles	
UEFA Euro 2008	April 17, 2008	PlayStation 2	EA Canada	
UEFA Euro 2008	April 17, 2008	PlayStation 3	EA Canada	
UEFA Euro 2008	April 17, 2008	PlayStation Portable	EA Canada	
UEFA Euro 2008	April 17, 2008	Microsoft Windows	EA Canada	
UEFA Euro 2008	April 17, 2008	Xbox 360	EA Canada	
Boom Blox	May 6, 2008	Wii	EA Los Angeles / DreamWorks Interactive	
Spore	May 17, 2008	Macintosh	Maxis	
Spore	May 17, 2008	Microsoft Windows	Maxis	
NASCAR 09	June 10, 2008	Mobile phones	EA Tiburon	
NASCAR 09	June 10, 2008	PlayStation 2	EA Tiburon	
NASCAR 09	June 10, 2008	PlayStation 3	EA Tiburon	
NASCAR 09	June 10, 2008	Xbox 360	EA Tiburon	
Spore Creature Creator	June 17, 2008	Macintosh	Maxis	
Spore Creature Creator	June 17, 2008	Microsoft Windows	Maxis	
Battlefield: Bad Company	June 23, 2008	PlayStation 3	EA DICE	
Battlefield: Bad Company	June 23, 2008	Xbox 360	EA DICE	
SimCity Societies: Destinations	June 23, 2008	Microsoft Windows	Tilted Mill Entertainment	
Scrabble	July 9, 2008	iOS	EA Mobile	
Scrabble	March 17, 2009	Nintendo DS	EA Mobile	
Scrabble	March 17, 2009	PlayStation Network	EA Mobile	
Scrabble	March 17, 2009	Xbox Live Arcade	Electronic Arts	
Tetris	July 9, 2008	iOS	EA Mobile / Electronic Arts	
Tetris	August 24, 2009	Blackberry	EA Mobile / Electronic Arts	
Tetris	October 1, 2009	PlayStation Portable	EA Mobile / Electronic Arts	
NCAA Football 09	July 15, 2008	PlayStation 2	EA Tiburon / EA Canada	
NCAA Football 09	July 15, 2008	PlayStation 3	EA Tiburon / EA Canada	
NCAA Football 09	July 15, 2008	PlayStation Portable	EA Tiburon / EA Canada	
NCAA Football 09	July 15, 2008	Wii	EA Tiburon / EA Canada	
NCAA Football 09	July 15, 2008	Xbox 360	EA Tiburon / EA Canada	
Sudoku	July 16, 2008	iOS	Electronic Arts	
Brain Training for Dummies	August 7, 2008	Microsoft Windows	EA Casual	
Pet Society	August 8, 2008	Facebook	Playfish / Electronic Arts	
Madden NFL 09	August 12, 2008	Nintendo DS	EA Tiburon	
Madden NFL 09	August 12, 2008	PlayStation 2	EA Tiburon	
Madden NFL 09	August 12, 2008	PlayStation 3	EA Tiburon	
Madden NFL 09	August 12, 2008	PlayStation Portable	EA Tiburon	
Madden NFL 09	August 12, 2008	Wii	EA Tiburon	
Madden NFL 09	August 12, 2008	Xbox	EA Tiburon	
Madden NFL 09	August 12, 2008	Xbox 360	EA Tiburon	
Madden NFL 09	September 25, 2008	Mobile phones	EA Tiburon	
The Sims 2: Apartment Life	August 25, 2008	Microsoft Windows	Maxis Redwood Shores	
Spore Origins	August 25, 2008	iOS	Babaroga / Tricky Software	
Spore Origins	September 5, 2008	Mobile phones	Babaroga / Tricky Software	
Tiger Woods PGA Tour 09	August 26, 2008	PlayStation 2	Exient Entertainment	
Tiger Woods PGA Tour 09	August 26, 2008	PlayStation 3	EA Tiburon	
Tiger Woods PGA Tour 09	August 26, 2008	PlayStation Portable	Exient Entertainment	
Tiger Woods PGA Tour 09	August 26, 2008	Wii	EA Tiburon	
Tiger Woods PGA Tour 09	August 26, 2008	Xbox 360	EA Tiburon	
Mercenaries 2: World in Flames	August 31, 2008	PlayStation 2	Artificial Mind and Movement	
Mercenaries 2: World in Flames	August 31, 2008	PlayStation 3	Pandemic Studios	
Mercenaries 2: World in Flames	August 31, 2008	Microsoft Windows	LTI Gray Matter	
Mercenaries 2: World in Flames	August 31, 2008	Xbox 360	Pandemic Studios	
NFL Head Coach 09	September 2, 2008	PlayStation 3	EA Tiburon	
NFL Head Coach 09	September 2, 2008	Xbox 360	EA Tiburon	
FaceBreaker	September 4, 2008	PlayStation 3	EA Canada	
FaceBreaker	September 4, 2008	Xbox 360	EA Canada	
FaceBreaker	November 11, 2008	Wii	EA Canada	
Spore Creatures	September 4, 2008	Nintendo DS	Griptonite Games	
Spore Creatures	December 4, 2009	Windows Mobile	EA Mobile	
Spore Creatures	December 9, 2009	BlackBerry	Electronic Arts Nederland BV	
NHL 09	September 9, 2008	PlayStation 3	EA Canada	
NHL 09	September 9, 2008	Xbox 360	EA Canada	
NHL 09	October 20, 2008	Microsoft Windows	HB Studios	
NHL 09	November 4, 2008	PlayStation 2	HB Studios	
Rock Band 2	September 14, 2008	Xbox 360	Harmonix	
Rock Band 2	October 19, 2008	PlayStation 3	Harmonix	
Rock Band 2	December 18, 2008	PlayStation 2	Pi Studios	
Rock Band 2	December 18, 2008	Wii	Pi Studios	
Crysis Warhead	September 16, 2008	Microsoft Windows	Crytek Budapest	
Warhammer Online: Age of Reckoning	September 18, 2008	Microsoft Windows	Mythic Entertainment	
Warhammer Online: Age of Reckoning	July 30, 2009	Macintosh	Mythic Entertainment	
Medal of Honor: 10th Anniversary Bundle	September 22, 2008	Microsoft Windows	Electronic Arts	
Trivial Pursuit Daily 20	September 25, 2008	Microsoft Windows	Electronic Arts	
Zubo	October 3, 2008	Nintendo DS	EA Bright Light	
NBA Live 09	October 7, 2008	PlayStation 2	HB Studios	
NBA Live 09	October 7, 2008	PlayStation 3	EA Canada	
NBA Live 09	October 7, 2008	PlayStation Portable	HB Studios	
NBA Live 09	October 7, 2008	Wii	HB Studios	
NBA Live 09	October 7, 2008	Xbox 360	EA Canada	
FIFA 09	October 9, 2008	Java ME	EA Canada	
FIFA 09	October 9, 2008	Nintendo DS	Exient Entertainment	
FIFA 09	October 9, 2008	PlayStation 2	HB Studios	
FIFA 09	October 9, 2008	PlayStation 3	EA Canada	
FIFA 09	October 9, 2008	PlayStation Portable	HB Studios	
FIFA 09	October 9, 2008	Wii	Sumo Digital	
FIFA 09	October 9, 2008	Microsoft Windows	HB Studios	
FIFA 09	October 9, 2008	Xbox 360	EA Canada	
FIFA 09	October 9, 2008	Zeebo	Gamelion Inc.	
FIFA 09	November 18, 2008	Mobile phones	EA Canada	
FIFA 09	November 18, 2008	N-Gage 2	EA Canada	
Dead Space	October 13, 2008	PlayStation 3	EA Redwood Shores	
Dead Space	October 13, 2008	Microsoft Windows	EA Redwood Shores	
Dead Space	October 13, 2008	Xbox 360	EA Redwood Shores	
Boogie Superstar	October 14, 2008	Wii	EA Montreal	
Celebrity Sports Showdown	October 20, 2008	Wii	EA Canada	
Monopoly	October 20, 2008	PlayStation 2	Electronic Arts / Hasbro	
Monopoly	October 20, 2008	Wii	Electronic Arts / Hasbro	
Monopoly	October 20, 2008	Xbox 360	Electronic Arts / Hasbro	
Monopoly	December 22, 2009	iOS	EA Mobile / Hasbro	
Command & Conquer: Red Alert 3	October 28, 2008	Microsoft Windows	EA Los Angeles	
Command & Conquer: Red Alert 3	November 11, 2008	Xbox 360	EA Los Angeles	
Command & Conquer: Red Alert 3	March 2009	Macintosh	EA Los Angeles	
Command & Conquer: Red Alert 3	March 23, 2009	PlayStation 3	EA Los Angeles	
MySims Kingdom	October 28, 2008	Nintendo DS	EA Redwood Shores	
MySims Kingdom	October 28, 2008	Wii	TOSE	
Nerf N-Strike	October 28, 2008	Wii	EA Salt Lake	
Operation Mania	October 28, 2008	Microsoft Windows	Electronic Arts / Hasbro	
FIFA Manager 09	October 31, 2008	Microsoft Windows	Bright Future	
Hasbro Family Game Night	November 11, 2008	PlayStation 2	EA Bright Light	
Hasbro Family Game Night	November 11, 2008	Wii	Virtuos	
Hasbro Family Game Night	March 18, 2009	Xbox Live Arcade	EA Bright Light	
Hasbro Family Game Night	October 29, 2009	PlayStation Network	EA Bright Light	
Mirror's Edge	November 11, 2008	PlayStation 3	EA DICE	
Mirror's Edge	November 11, 2008	Xbox 360	EA DICE	
Mirror's Edge	January 12, 2009	Microsoft Windows	EA DICE	
Left 4 Dead (Note: Valve is the publisher of Left 4 Dead. Electronic Arts is the retail distributor for the game.)	November 18, 2008	Microsoft Windows	Valve South	
Left 4 Dead	November 18, 2008	Xbox 360	Valve South	
Need for Speed: Undercover	November 18, 2008	BlackBerry	EA Black Box	
Need for Speed: Undercover	November 18, 2008	iOS	EA Black Box	
Need for Speed: Undercover	November 18, 2008	Nintendo DS	Firebrand Games	
Need for Speed: Undercover	November 18, 2008	PlayStation 2	Exient Entertainment	
Need for Speed: Undercover	November 18, 2008	PlayStation 3	EA Black Box	
Need for Speed: Undercover	November 18, 2008	PlayStation Portable	EA Black Box	
Need for Speed: Undercover	November 18, 2008	Symbian	EA Black Box	
Need for Speed: Undercover	November 18, 2008	Wii	Exient Entertainment	
Need for Speed: Undercover	November 18, 2008	Xbox 360	EA Black Box	
Skate It	November 19, 2008	Nintendo DS	Exient Entertainment	
Skate It	November 19, 2008	Wii	EA Montreal	
SimCity	December 18, 2008	iOS	Maxis	
NBA Street Online	2008	Microsoft Windows	Electronic Arts / Neowiz / GigaMedia Limited	
The Lord of the Rings: Conquest	January 9, 2009	Nintendo DS	Pandemic Studios	
The Lord of the Rings: Conquest	January 9, 2009	PlayStation 3	Pandemic Studios	
The Lord of the Rings: Conquest	January 9, 2009	Microsoft Windows	Pandemic Studios	
The Lord of the Rings: Conquest	January 9, 2009	Xbox 360	Pandemic Studios	
Skate 2	January 21, 2009	PlayStation 3	EA Black Box	
Skate 2	January 21, 2009	Xbox 360	EA Black Box	
SimAnimals	January 21, 2009	Nintendo DS	Electronic Arts	
SimAnimals	January 21, 2009	Wii	Electronic Arts	
3 on 3 NHL Arcade	February 5, 2009	PlayStation Network	EA Canada	
3 on 3 NHL Arcade	February 11, 2009	Xbox Live Arcade	EA Canada	
Burnout Paradise: The Ultimate Box	February 5, 2009	Microsoft Windows	Criterion Games	
Burnout Paradise: The Ultimate Box	February 6, 2009	PlayStation 3	Criterion Games	
Burnout Paradise: The Ultimate Box	February 6, 2009	Xbox 360	Criterion Games	
MySims Party	March 10, 2009	Nintendo DS	Hudson Soft	
MySims Party	March 10, 2009	Wii	EA Redwood Shores	
Trivial Pursuit	March 10, 2009	iOS	Electronic Arts	
Trivial Pursuit	March 10, 2009	PlayStation 2	Electronic Arts	
Trivial Pursuit	March 10, 2009	PlayStation 3	Electronic Arts	
Trivial Pursuit	March 10, 2009	Xbox 360	Electronic Arts	
Trivial Pursuit	March 10, 2009	Wii	Electronic Arts	
Command & Conquer: Red Alert 3 – Uprising	March 12, 2009	Microsoft Windows	EA Los Angeles	
Hi-Octane	March 12, 2009	PlayStation Network	Bullfrog Productions	
Battleship	March 17, 2009	iOS	Electronic Arts	
Henry Hatsworth in the Puzzling Adventure	March 17, 2009	Nintendo DS	EA Tiburon	
BattleForge	March 23, 2009	Microsoft Windows	EA Phenomic	
The Godfather II	April 7, 2009	PlayStation 3	EA Redwood Shores	
The Godfather II	April 7, 2009	Microsoft Windows	EA Redwood Shores	
The Godfather II	April 7, 2009	Xbox 360	EA Redwood Shores	
Lemonade Tycoon	April 15, 2009	iOS	Hexacto / JAMDAT	
Mystery Mania	April 15, 2009	iOS	EA Mobile	
Pandemonium!	April 24, 2009	iOS	Toys for Bob	
Tiger Woods PGA Tour 10	April 30, 2009	iOS	EA Tiburon	
Tiger Woods PGA Tour 10	June 6, 2009	PlayStation 2	HB Studios	
Tiger Woods PGA Tour 10	June 6, 2009	PlayStation 3	EA Tiburon	
Tiger Woods PGA Tour 10	June 6, 2009	PlayStation Portable	HB Studios	
Tiger Woods PGA Tour 10	June 6, 2009	Wii	EA Tiburon	
Tiger Woods PGA Tour 10	June 6, 2009	Xbox 360	EA Tiburon	
Star Trek	May 7, 2009	iOS	EA Mobile	
SNOOD	May 8, 2009	iOS	Iron Galaxy	
Wolfenstein RPG	May 11, 2009	iOS	id Software / Fountainhead Entertainment	
Boom Blox Bash Party	May 19, 2009	Wii	EA Los Angeles / DreamWorks Interactive	
EA Sports Active	May 19, 2009	Wii	EA Canada	
Monopoly Here & Now: The World Edition	May 21, 2009	iOS	Electronic Arts / Hasbro	
Monopoly Here & Now: The World Edition	August 8, 2009	N-Gage	Electronic Arts / Hasbro	
CLUE: Unravel the Clues and Crack the Case	May 29, 2009	iOS	EA Montreal	
The Sims 3	June 2, 2009	Android	EA Mobile	
The Sims 3	June 2, 2009	BlackBerry	EA Mobile	
The Sims 3	June 2, 2009	iOS	EA Mobile	
The Sims 3	June 2, 2009	Macintosh	Maxis Redwood Shores	
The Sims 3	June 2, 2009	Microsoft Windows	Maxis Redwood Shores	
Grand Slam Tennis	June 8, 2009	Wii	EA Canada	
Rock Band Unplugged	June 9, 2009	PlayStation Portable	Harmonix / Backbone Entertainment	
American Idol	June 10, 2009	iOS	Electronic Arts	
The Sims 3 Collector's Edition	June 10, 2009	Microsoft Windows	Maxis	
MySims Racing	June 12, 2009	Nintendo DS	Artificial Mind & Movement	
MySims Racing	June 12, 2009	Wii	Artificial Mind & Movement	
Fight Night Round 4	June 23, 2009	PlayStation 3	EA Canada	
Fight Night Round 4	June 23, 2009	Xbox 360	EA Canada	
Fight Night Round 4	September 22, 2009	Windows Mobile	EA Canada	
Fight Night Round 4	October 23, 2009	Blackberry	EA Canada	
Mass Effect Galaxy	June 23, 2009	iOS	BioWare	
Spore Galactic Adventures	June 23, 2009	Microsoft Windows	Maxis Emeryville	
Battlefield Heroes	June 25, 2009	Microsoft Windows	EA DICE / Easy Studios	
Harry Potter and the Half-Blood Prince	June 30, 2009	Macintosh	EA Bright Light	
Harry Potter and the Half-Blood Prince	June 30, 2009	Nintendo DS	EA Bright Light	
Harry Potter and the Half-Blood Prince	June 30, 2009	PlayStation 2	EA Bright Light	
Harry Potter and the Half-Blood Prince	June 30, 2009	PlayStation 3	EA Bright Light	
Harry Potter and the Half-Blood Prince	June 30, 2009	PlayStation Portable	EA Bright Light	
Harry Potter and the Half-Blood Prince	June 30, 2009	Wii	EA Bright Light	
Harry Potter and the Half-Blood Prince	June 30, 2009	Microsoft Windows	EA Bright Light	
Harry Potter and the Half-Blood Prince	June 30, 2009	Xbox 360	EA Bright Light	
NCAA Football 10	July 14, 2009	iOS	EA Tiburon	
NCAA Football 10	July 14, 2009	PlayStation 2	EA Canada	
NCAA Football 10	July 14, 2009	PlayStation 3	EA Tiburon	
NCAA Football 10	July 14, 2009	PlayStation Portable	EA Tiburon	
NCAA Football 10	July 14, 2009	Xbox 360	EA Tiburon	
G.I. Joe: The Rise of Cobra	August 4, 2009	Mobile phones	Backbone Entertainment	
G.I. Joe: The Rise of Cobra	August 4, 2009	Nintendo DS	Backbone Entertainment	
G.I. Joe: The Rise of Cobra	August 4, 2009	PlayStation 2	Double Helix Games	
G.I. Joe: The Rise of Cobra	August 4, 2009	PlayStation 3	Double Helix Games	
G.I. Joe: The Rise of Cobra	August 4, 2009	PlayStation Portable	Double Helix Games	
G.I. Joe: The Rise of Cobra	August 4, 2009	Wii	Double Helix Games	
G.I. Joe: The Rise of Cobra	August 4, 2009	Xbox 360	Double Helix Games	
The Game of Life	August 13, 2009	iOS	Electronic Arts	
Madden NFL 10	August 13, 2009	PlayStation 3	EA Tiburon	
Madden NFL 10	August 13, 2009	Wii	EA Tiburon	
Madden NFL 10	August 13, 2009	Xbox 360	EA Tiburon	
Madden NFL 10	August 14, 2009	PlayStation Portable	EA Tiburon	
Madden NFL 10	August 14, 2009	PlayStation 2	EA Tiburon	
Madden NFL 10	August 20, 2009	BlackBerry	EA Tiburon	
Madden NFL 10	September 9, 2009	iOS	EA Tiburon	
The Beatles: Rock Band	September 9, 2009	PlayStation 3	Harmonix	
The Beatles: Rock Band	September 9, 2009	Wii	Pi Studios	
The Beatles: Rock Band	September 9, 2009	Xbox 360	Harmonix	
Need for Speed: Shift	September 15, 2009	iOS	Slightly Mad Studios	
Need for Speed: Shift	September 15, 2009	PlayStation 3	Slightly Mad Studios	
Need for Speed: Shift	September 15, 2009	PlayStation Portable	EA Bright Light	
Need for Speed: Shift	September 15, 2009	Microsoft Windows	Slightly Mad Studios	
Need for Speed: Shift	September 15, 2009	Xbox 360	Slightly Mad Studios	
Need for Speed: Shift	September 15, 2009	Android	Slightly Mad Studios	
Need for Speed: Shift	September 15, 2009	Windows Mobile	Slightly Mad Studios	
NHL 10	September 15, 2009	PlayStation 3	EA Canada	
NHL 10	September 15, 2009	Xbox 360	EA Canada	
Boggle	September 18, 2009	iOS	Electronic Arts	
Command & Conquer: Red Alert 3: Commander's Challenge	September 24, 2009	PlayStation 3	EA Los Angeles	
Command & Conquer: Red Alert 3: Commander's Challenge	September 24, 2009	Xbox 360	EA Los Angeles	
Dead Space: Extraction	September 24, 2009	Wii	Visceral Games / Eurocom	
MySims Agents	September 25, 2009	Nintendo DS	TOSE	
MySims Agents	September 25, 2009	Wii	Visceral Games	
FIFA 10	October 1, 2009	Android	EA Canada	
FIFA 10	October 1, 2009	Java ME	EA Canada	
FIFA 10	October 1, 2009	Nintendo DS	Exient Entertainment	
FIFA 10	October 1, 2009	PlayStation 2	HB Studios	
FIFA 10	October 1, 2009	PlayStation 3	EA Canada	
FIFA 10	October 1, 2009	PlayStation Portable	HB Studios	
FIFA 10	October 1, 2009	Wii	Sumo Digital	
FIFA 10	October 1, 2009	Microsoft Windows	HB Studios	
FIFA 10	October 1, 2009	Xbox 360	EA Canada	
FIFA 10	October 2, 2009	iOS	EA Canada	
Nuclear Strike	October 1, 2009	PlayStation Network	Electronic Arts	
NBA Live 10	October 6, 2009	PlayStation 3	EA Canada	
NBA Live 10	October 6, 2009	PlayStation Portable	HB Studios	
NBA Live 10	October 6, 2009	Xbox 360	EA Canada	
NBA Live 10	October 23, 2009	iOS	EA Canada	
Spore Hero	October 6, 2009	Wii	EA Montreal	
Spore Hero Arena	October 6, 2009	Nintendo DS	Full Fat	
Brütal Legend	October 13, 2009	PlayStation 3	Double Fine Productions	
Brütal Legend	October 13, 2009	Xbox 360	Double Fine Productions	
Command & Conquer: Red Alert	October 16, 2009	iOS	Electronic Arts	
Rock Band	October 19, 2009	iOS	EA Montreal / Harmonix	
Hasbro Family Game Night 2	October 26, 2009	Nintendo DS	EA Bright Light	
Hasbro Family Game Night 2	October 26, 2009	Wii	Virtuos	
Nerf N-Strike Elite	October 26, 2009	Wii	EA Salt Lake	
SimAnimals Africa	October 27, 2009	Nintendo DS	Electronic Arts	
SimAnimals Africa	October 27, 2009	Wii	Electronic Arts	
FIFA Manager 10	October 30, 2009	Microsoft Windows	Bright Future	
Dragon Age: Origins	November 3, 2009	PlayStation 3	BioWare	
Dragon Age: Origins	November 3, 2009	Microsoft Windows	BioWare	
Dragon Age: Origins	November 3, 2009	Xbox 360	BioWare	
Dragon Age: Origins	December 21, 2009	Macintosh	BioWare	
Need for Speed: Nitro	November 3, 2009	Nintendo DS	Firebrand Games	
Need for Speed: Nitro	November 3, 2009	Wii	EA Montreal	
Jewel Quest Mysteries	November 6, 2009	iOS	iWin.com	
Soviet Strike	November 11, 2009	PlayStation Network	Electronic Arts	
EA Sports Active More Workouts	November 17, 2009	Wii	EA Canada	
Left 4 Dead 2 (Note: Valve is the publisher of Left 4 Dead 2. Electronic Arts is the retail distributor for the game.)	November 17, 2009	Microsoft Windows	Valve	
Left 4 Dead 2	November 17, 2009	Xbox 360	Valve	
Connect 4	November 18, 2009	iOS	Electronic Arts	
The Sims 3: World Adventures	November 18, 2009	iOS	EA Mobile	
The Sims 3: World Adventures	November 18, 2009	Macintosh	Maxis Redwood Shores	
The Sims 3: World Adventures	November 18, 2009	Microsoft Windows	Maxis Redwood Shores	
Madden NFL Arcade	November 24, 2009	PlayStation Network	EA Tiburon	
Madden NFL Arcade	November 24, 2009	Xbox Live Arcade	EA Tiburon	
Foto Face: The Face Stealer Strikes	November 30, 2009	DSiWare	Electronic Arts	
Auditorium	December 2, 2009	iOS	Cipher Prime	
The Saboteur	December 3, 2009	PlayStation 3	Pandemic Studios	
The Saboteur	December 3, 2009	Microsoft Windows	Pandemic Studios	
The Saboteur	December 3, 2009	Xbox 360	Pandemic Studios	
Flips	December 4, 2009	Nintendo DS	Electronic Arts	
The Simpsons Arcade	December 19, 2009	iOS	Konami	

== See also ==
- List of Electronic Arts games
- List of Electronic Arts games: 1983–1999
- List of Electronic Arts games: 2010–2019
- List of Electronic Arts games: 2020–present
