= Playground (disambiguation) =

A playground is an area designed for children to play in.

Playground may also refer to:

== Arts, entertainment, and media ==
- Playground (1990 film), a short film starring Michael Jordan directed by Zack Snyder
- EA Playground, a 2007 video game developed by Electronic Arts
- Playground (2009 film), a documentary film directed by Libby Spears
- Playground (2021 film), a Belgian drama film directed by Laura Wandel
- Playground (Canadian TV series) (1962), a Canadian television series
- Playground (Indian TV series) (2022), an Indian television series
- Playground (3/3), a public artwork by Tony Smith, in Beverly Gardens Park, Beverly Hills, California
- Playground (novel), a novel by Richard Powers
- Playground, a novel by 50 Cent
- Playground AI, an AI image generator and editor
- Playground, a 2022 splatterpunk novel by Aron Beauregard

== Businesses ==
- Playground Games, a British video game developer
- The Playground Theater, Chicago
- Playground Global, an early-stage venture capital firm
- Playground Entertainment, a British-American production company

== Music ==
- Playground (Manu Katché album), 2007
- Playground (Michel Petrucciani album), 1991
- Playground (Steve Kuhn & Sheila Jordan album), 1979
- Playground Music Scandinavia, a Scandinavian-based record label
- "Playground" (song), a 1991 song by Another Bad Creation
- "Playground", a song by Dreamcatcher from Apocalypse: Save Us, 2022
- "Playground", a song by Bea Miller from Arcane League of Legends (Soundtrack from the Animated Series), 2021
- The Playground (album), 1998 album by Tony Bennett

== Other uses ==
- Playgrounds (Xcode feature), an environment in Xcode for rapid experimentation and development in the Swift programming language
- Swift Playgrounds, a standalone educational tool and development environment for the Swift programming language developed by Apple Inc.
