= Global VR =

American video game company

- Type: Private
- Industry: Video games
- Founded: 1998
- Headquarters: San Jose, California, U.S.
- Key people: Ken Bayer (President)
- Website: Global VR official website

Global VR is a company based in San Jose, California, that makes arcade games. The company once manufactured virtual reality stands as well. It has also developed electronic kiosks and offers development services for mobile platforms.

== History ==
The company was founded in 1998 starting in a garage with four employees. The company used to operate virtual reality stands that it purchased from Ferris Productions in 2003, usually located inside theme parks, such as Six Flags. Global VR closed these stands in 2004.

The company's chief business is the development of arcade games. Many of the company's games are PC games adapted for arcades. Global VR has licensing rights from Electronic Arts, and has developed arcade games based on Madden NFL, Need For Speed, and Tiger Woods PGA Tour. Other Global VR titles are based on popular licenses, such as Aliens: Extermination and Justice League: Heroes United.

Its mobile application development division provides development services for iOS and Android devices and other mobile platforms. The company has also partnered with Streak Technology Inc. to develop kiosks used in such locations as Albertsons supermarkets and Texas Roadhouse restaurants.

== Selected games ==
- The Swarm, a shooter and spiritual sequel to Aliens Extermination where the player fends off alien invaders while absorbing their powers.
- Shh..! Welcome to Frightfearland, a rail-shooter sequel to Taito's arcade series Panic Museum and a spiritual sequel to Aliens Extermination.
- Blazing Angels: Squadrons of WWII, a World War II combat fighter pilot game based on the Ubisoft franchise.
- Twisted: Nitro Stunt Racing, a coin-operated arcade port of GameSeed's PC racing title Nitro Stunt Racing.
- Need for Speed Carbon, a multiplayer arcade driving game based on Electronic Arts Need for Speed franchise.
- Need for Speed Underground, an arcade adaptation of Electronic Arts Need for Speed franchise.
- PGA Tour Golf Team Challenge, an update to Challenge Edition and based upon the Tiger Woods Golf console game made by Electronic Arts.
- Aliens: Extermination, a game which is based on the 1986 film Aliens.
- Madden Season 2, an update to the Madden Football game based on Electronic Arts Madden franchise.
- Paradise Lost, a two-player shooter based on Far Cry Instincts and another spiritual sequel to Aliens Extermination
- EA Sports NASCAR Racing, a coin-operated version of Electronic Arts' NASCAR franchise.
- EA Sports NASCAR Team Racing, an updated version of NASCAR Racing.
- UltraPin, a video pinball game featuring multiple licensed classic pinball tables.
- Vortek V3, a stand up virtual reality simulation machine.
- Beach Head 2000, a shooting game for the Vortek platform.
- Need for Speed GT, a multiplayer arcade driving game based on Electronic Arts' Need for Speed franchise.
- Justice League: Heroes United, an original 3D beat 'em-up coin-operated game similar to games like Die Hard Arcade that features licensed DC Comics heroes such as Superman, Batman, and Wonder Woman.

== Distributed games ==
- Gaelco Championship Tuning Race, a racing game originally made by Gaelco S.A. of Barcelona, Spain.
- Kick-It, a soccer simulator originally made by Interactive Light, which utilizes the same Smart Beam sensor technology used for their Dimension Beam synthesizers. Global VR also acquired and re-released Kick-It Pro, an expanded version of the game.

== Players' Card ==
Certain games allow players to save their game data on a card.
