= Justice League Heroes United =

2009 arcade game

- Developer: Global VR
- Publisher: Global VR
- Platform: Arcade
- Release: NA: 2009; JP: 2009
- Genre: Beat 'em up
- Mode: Up to 2 players simultaneously

Justice League Heroes United is a 2009 arcade game based on the Justice League comic books.

== Gameplay ==
Up to two players select a fighter from five DC Comics characters: Batman, Superman, Wonder Woman, Hawkgirl, and Green Lantern. The selectable locations are a city, a spaceship, and an apocalyptic planet. The game is of the Beat 'em up genre.

== Reception ==
The game was viewed unfavorably. The website ScrewAttack ranked it as the sixth-worst superhero videogame and Comic Book Resources stated that "Most people will likely get bored of it."
