= Playground (Canadian TV series) =

- Genre: short film
- Country of origin: Canada
- Original language: English
- No. of seasons: 1

Production
- Running time: 30 minutes
- Production company: National Film Board of Canada

Original release
- Network: CBC Television
- Release: 4 July – 26 September 1962

Playground is a Canadian short film television series that aired on CBC Television in 1962.

== Premise ==
This series featured material from the National Film Board of Canada, typically two short films per episode situated in regions of Canada which receive less recognition. The series run included films on Newfoundland, northern Ontario fishing, the Shubenacadie sanctuary in Nova Scotia with its wildlife and the Yukon.

== Scheduling ==
This half-hour series was broadcast on Wednesdays at 4:00 p.m. from 4 July to 26 September 1962.
