= NCAA Football 10 =

2009 video game

- Michael Crabtree on the Xbox 360 cover of the game.
- Developer: EA Tiburon
- Publisher: Electronic Arts
- Platforms: Xbox 360, PlayStation 3, PlayStation Portable, PlayStation 2
- Release: NA: July 14, 2009
- Genre: Sports
- Modes: Single player, multiplayer

NCAA Football 10 is a college football video game created by Electronic Arts. It is the successor to NCAA Football 09 in the NCAA Football series. It was released on July 14, 2009 for Xbox 360, PlayStation 3, PlayStation Portable, and PlayStation 2 consoles. Brian Johnson, Brian Orakpo, Mark Sanchez, and Michael Crabtree were the cover athletes for the game.

== Cover ==
- Former Utah Utes quarterback Brian Johnson is the cover athlete for the PlayStation 3.
- Former Texas Longhorns defensive end Brian Orakpo is the cover athlete for the PlayStation 2.
- Former USC Trojans quarterback Mark Sanchez is the cover athlete for the PlayStation Portable.
- Former Texas Tech Red Raiders wide receiver Michael Crabtree is the cover athlete for the Xbox 360.

== TeamBuilder ==
One of the new additions, TeamBuilder, has a wide range of possible teams that could be made, including teams that reference other games, old college football teams, current and old high school football teams. The website has since been taken down as the link to it now forwards to the Madden website.

== Reception ==
Reviews

Review scores
Publication	Score
1Up.com	B
GamePro	4/5
GameSpot	8/10
GameTrailers	8.2
GameZone	8.3/10
IGN	8.3/10

NCAA Football 10 has received mostly positive reviews from critics. IGN praised the multitude of new features in the game although were disappointed about the graphics and audio saying that the game "looks a lot like last year".

== See also ==
- Madden NFL 10
