= Madden NFL 10 =

2009 video game

- Cover art featuring Troy Polamalu (left) and Larry Fitzgerald
- Developer: EA Tiburon
- Publisher: EA Sports
- Series: Madden NFL
- Platforms: PlayStation 2 PlayStation 3 PlayStation Portable; Wii; Xbox 360 iOS; BlackBerry
- Release: AU: August 13, 2009 (PS3, Wii, X360); NA: August 14, 2009; EU: August 14, 2009 (PS2, PS3, PSP, Wii, X360); NA: August 20, 2009 (BB); NA: September 9, 2009 (iOS); Madden NFL Arcade: NA: November 24, 2009; KOR: November 24, 2009 (PS3); JP: November 25, 2009 (X360); EU: November 26, 2009 (PS3); AU: November 26, 2009 (PS3); JP: December 3, 2009 (PS3); EU: April 10, 2010 (X360); AU: April 10, 2010 (X360); KOR: April 10, 2010 (X360)
- Genre: Sports

Madden NFL 10 is an American football video game based on the National Football League that was published by EA Sports and developed by EA Tiburon. The 20th installment of the Madden NFL series, it is the first game to feature two players on the cover: Troy Polamalu of the Pittsburgh Steelers and Larry Fitzgerald of the Arizona Cardinals, who played against each other the previous season in Super Bowl XLIII. It was released in August 2009 for the PlayStation 2, PlayStation 3, PlayStation Portable, Wii, Xbox 360 and BlackBerry, and for the iOS on September 9 through the App Store.

== New features ==
=== Gameplay ===
All of the features apply to the PS3 and Xbox 360 versions of the game, unless otherwise noted below.

- PRO-TAK – New animation technology that allows up to nine players to be involved in tackles, ability to steer tackles, a more realistic pocket around the QB caused by a new blocking system, and QB avoidance actions.
- Fight for the Fumble (Xbox 360, PS3, PS2, PSP) – A fumble pile-up that triggers when a fumble occurs near two players. To gain possession, the user must repeatedly press a series of buttons that appear on the screen.
- New Ratings Philosophy – Ratings have been re-scaled for a more noticeable difference between players, and new ratings such as Throw accuracy deep, medium, short, and throw on run and many more, make players styles more realistic.
- Sim Style Gameplay – Game speed has been reduced for a more realistic, life like experience.
- Player Momentum – More realistic acceleration, deceleration, planting & turn rates.
- Quarterback Improvements – Layered blending, new QB ratings and more realistic QB dropback animations.
- WR/DB Interaction – Improved route running and coverage.
- Play Designer (PSP) – Players can create custom plays and formations, then upload them directly to a PlayStation 3.

=== Presentation ===
- Procedural Awareness – System which allows each player to realistically follow the ball using head, eyes, neck and shoulders.
- Depth of Field – All new system which will not only improve the visual quality of the game but will allow a more realistic broadcast experience.
- New Injury System – Injury status/severity is delayed instead of immediate for more suspense and realism, all new animations with trainers and injury carts are shown, players playing injured have their ratings affected negatively and are at chance of re-injuring themselves.
- The Extra Point – A weekly wrap-up show with Fran Charles and Alex Flanagan in franchise mode.
- Halftime/Postgame Show – Recaps stats and highlights with Alex Flanagan.
- Super Bowl Presentation – United States Air Force Thunderbirds and National Anthem, along with Super Bowl patches for jerseys and team specific endzones, sidelines and midfield logos.
- Cutscenes – Multiple pre/post play cutscenes along with camera angles such as coaches on the sidelines and quarterbacks talking on the phone.
- New announcers (PSP, PS2, Wii) – The PSP, PS2, and Wii versions of the game received new announcers in Tom Hammond and Cris Collinsworth. They replaced Al Michaels and John Madden.
- Chain gang – The chain gang comes out on a close call for a first down. If it's not a successful first down, the referee will signal how much is left. If it's successful, the referee will point to the team's endzone, just like in real life.

=== Other ===
- Superstar Mode – Made more simple. Aspects such as messages and interviews were removed.
- Improved Franchise Mode – Improved progression and regression, offseason signing logic, draft logic (players will be picked on needs of the team) and pre-created draft classes and more. Includes the new "Extra Point".
- New Creation Features – New accessories such as QB towels, additional facemasks, handwarmers, new gloves, arm bands and more.
- Addition of the Wildcat offense (Xbox 360, PS3, PSP, PS2, Wii) – Players can now run the wildcat offense.
- Signature QB throwing-style animations – Signature throwing styles for quarterbacks, only quarterbacks who are the default starting or top drafted quarterbacks in the game.
- Signature Kicking Styles – Different kicking styles.
- Uniforms – Ability to mix-n-match uniforms with a 3D preview of the uniform while editing. Allowing players to customize team jerseys.
- Accelerated Clock – Automatic runoff of time from the clock after the huddle. Returned from the Windows version of Madden 2008. Similar to Chew Clock in NCAA Football 10.
- Cheat codes (Wii) – For the first time since Madden NFL 07, a cheat code system is in place to unlock content such as franchise mode and the Super Bowl XLIV stadium (Sun Life Stadium in Miami Gardens, Florida).

== Cover ==
For the first time in the Madden NFL series, the cover features two players: Troy Polamalu of the Pittsburgh Steelers and Larry Fitzgerald of the Arizona Cardinals. Both players participated in Super Bowl XLIII. On the Wii version of the game, several Cardinals players can be noticed in the background.

In the NFL Kickoff game against the Tennessee Titans, Polamalu sprained his MCL while blocking a field goal attempt, causing him to miss a majority of the season. Polamalu's injury has been linked to the continuation of the popular Madden Curse that plagues players immediately after gracing the cover of Madden. Fitzgerald, however, had a strong season, posting a career-high 13 touchdowns and earning Pro Bowl honors.

== AFL Legacy Pack ==
In light of the 50th Anniversary celebration of the American Football League, on September 24 the AFL Legacy Pack became available as downloadable content on the Xbox Live Marketplace and the PlayStation Network.

The pack includes throwback uniforms for the Buffalo Bills, New England Patriots (Boston Patriots), Tennessee Titans (Houston Oilers), San Diego Chargers, Oakland Raiders, Kansas City Chiefs (Dallas Texans), Denver Broncos, and New York Jets (Titans of New York), In addition, games can be played in a classic AFL film grain broadcast camera, referee uniforms are AFL-style orange throwbacks and the team logos on field are old-school. The AFL Legacy Pack also provides a new set of AFL specific Madden Moments and AFL Legacy Pack specific achievements with a 150-point total gain. This "AFL mode" has been met with much approval.

== Madden Ultimate Team ==
Madden Ultimate Team, also known as "MUT" (pronounced: "mutt") is a game mode released on January 7, 2010. In this mode, users are able to build a team by purchasing player packs. These packs are purchased with coins that are earned by winning a game, scoring a touchdown etc. They can also be purchased with real money through the user's PlayStation Network or Xbox Live accounts. As the user gains more coins, they are able to buy better packs of players, eventually building their "Ultimate Team".

This mode has received negative feedback with regards to the 'Player Contracts' that are attached to each 'Player Card'. When purchased 'Player Cards' have a 10 match contract - this decreases by 1 every game (even if due to disconnection). Replenishment of a contract on a 'Player Card' is done by a contract card that is purchased with coins. It is thus extremely difficult to keep a good team 'in contract' without spending real money. It is also possible to be in a position where you have a low amount of coins and not enough players to even play 'Madden Ultimate Team' - unless you wish to spend real money to buy contract cards to replenish your players contracts, or to buy new packs with - to try to fill the empty team positions that are stopping you from playing the mode.

== Madden NFL Arcade ==
EA Sports released Madden NFL Arcade as a downloadable title through the PSN Store and Xbox Live Marketplace networks on November 24 respectively. The game is a five-on-five arcade style football game similar to Midway's NFL Blitz, featuring all 32 NFL teams and stadiums.

The game features "Game Changers", which are similar to NFL Street's "Game Breakers". There are 13 Game Changers, with players having the opportunity to gain a Game Breaker prior to every play, and are able to use it at that instant or retain for later use.

== Reception ==
=== Madden NFL 10 ===
Madden NFL 10

Aggregate scores
Aggregator	Score					
Aggregator	iOS	PS2	PS3	PSP	Wii	Xbox 360
GameRankings	81.88%	71.50%	85.55%	79.50%	77.17%	86.51%
Metacritic	N/A	68/100	85/100	80/100	77/100	85/100

Review scores
Publication	Score					
Publication	iOS	PS2	PS3	PSP	Wii	Xbox 360
Destructoid	N/A	N/A	9.5/10	N/A	N/A	9/10
Eurogamer	N/A	N/A	8/10	N/A	N/A	8/10
Game Informer	N/A	N/A	8.75/10	N/A	6/10	8.75/10
GamePro	N/A	N/A	4.5/5	N/A	4/5	4.5/5
GameRevolution	N/A	N/A	B+	N/A	N/A	B+
GameSpot	8/10	N/A	7.5/10	N/A	6.5/10	7.5/10
GameSpy	N/A	N/A	N/A	N/A	N/A	4.5/5
GameTrailers	N/A	N/A	N/A	N/A	N/A	8.8/10
GameZone	N/A	N/A	8.7/10	N/A	8.1/10	8.5/10
IGN	8/10	7.3/10	8.9/10	7.9/10	8.2/10	8.9/10
Nintendo Power	N/A	N/A	N/A	N/A	(2010) 8/10 (2009) 7.5/10	N/A
Official Xbox Magazine (US)	N/A	N/A	N/A	N/A	N/A	9/10
PlayStation: The Official Magazine	N/A	N/A	4/5	N/A	N/A	N/A
411Mania	N/A	N/A	N/A	N/A	N/A	9/10
The A.V. Club	N/A	N/A	N/A	N/A	N/A	B−

Madden NFL 10 was met with positive to average reception. GameRankings and Metacritic gave it a score of 86.51% and 85 out of 100 for the Xbox 360 version; 85.55% and 85 out of 100 for the PlayStation 3 version; 81.88% for the iOS version; 79.50% and 80 out of 100 for the PSP version; 77.17% and 77 out of 100 for the Wii version; and 71.50% and 68 out of 100 for the PlayStation 2 version.

=== Madden NFL Arcade ===
Madden NFL Arcade

Aggregate scores
Aggregator	Score	
Aggregator	PS3	Xbox 360
GameRankings	64.62%	70.73%
Metacritic	60/100	66/100

Review scores
Publication	Score	
Publication	PS3	Xbox 360
1Up.com	C+	C+
Destructoid	6.5/10	N/A
GameSpot	5.5/10	5.5/10
GamesRadar+	2.5/5	2.5/5
IGN	6.5/10	6.5/10
PlayStation Official Magazine – UK	4/10	N/A
Official Xbox Magazine (US)	N/A	5/10
Play	58%	N/A
PSM3	58%	N/A
TeamXbox	N/A	8.2/10

Madden NFL Arcade was met with average to mixed reception upon release. GameRankings and Metacritic gave it a score of 71% and 66 out of 100 for the Xbox 360 version, and 65% and 60 out of 100 for the PlayStation 3 version.

== See also ==
- NCAA Football 10
