= PGA Tour Golf Team Challenge =

- Developers: Global VR, Electronic Arts
- Platforms: Arcade game, Everlast CPU with Nvidia graphics cards.
- Release: 2006
- Genre: Golf
- Modes: Driving range, World Tour, Stroke, team play, online tournaments.

PGA Tour Golf Team Challenge is a trackball-based golf arcade game series manufactured by Global VR of San Jose, California.

Based on the PC version of EA Sports' PGA Tour game, the game is run from a computer within the cabinet which has an Intel Pentium 4 processor and Nvidia GeForce video card.

The current - and final - edition of the PGA series is titled PGA Tour Golf ‘Team Challenge’. A player can select from a number of real PGA pro golfers & PGA tour courses in either 9 or 18 holes, against up to 3 other players or in team play of up to 4 players per team. The game has 3 main modes of play;

‘Play Golf’ mode (does not require a players’ card or online capabilities) has 13 eighteen-hole courses but if the machine is online/tournament enabled, there's a 14th ‘bonus’ course which changes every month. There are training courses and a driving range here as well as a front 9 ‘course’ and back 9 ‘course’ made up of various Fantasy course holes.

‘World Tour’ mode provides access to all 24 courses each with two hidden/secret skill-shots which unlock customizable items for your created golfer. This mode keeps track of your personal best course scores and once all 24 courses are complete, a ranking will be assigned using your combined average score - Rookie, Amateur, Scratch, Club Pro, Pro, Champion & Legend. You can continue to improve upon your scores to gain a higher ranking.

‘Tournaments’ run weekly featuring one of the 24 courses within the game. Tournament Leaderboards are displayed during the machine's ‘attract mode’ screens.

Online play (Tournaments and World Tour) requires the Global VR 2nd generation "Smart Card" reader (recognizable by two LED lights on the front) and accompanying Players’ Card Format for saving created golfers as well as World Tour stats & unlockable items. The original magnetic stripe card reader from the first three editions of PGA Tour Golf (lacks LED lights on the front) is not compatible with ‘Challenge’ and ‘Team Challenge’ editions.

== History ==
- 2002 - EA Sports' PGA Tour Golf is released, running on DFI computer featuring 512 MB RAM, 20 GB hard drive, P4 Processor and Nvidia GeForce 4 video card.
  - 7 courses included; Pebble Beach, The Prince Course, Royal Birkdale, Spyglass Hill, TPC Sawgrass, Timber Hill & Scorpion Ridge.
  - Tournaments are introduced with version 1.2 update October ‘02.
- August 2003 - Championship edition adds seven new courses (Sahalee, St. Andrews, Poppy Hills, TPC Scottsdale, Highlands, Predator, Timber Hill 2, Scorpion Ridge 2), weather effects, time of day, lefty golfers.
- September 2003 - Global VR offers conversion kits for sale to Operators who are unhappy with the frequent and expensive Golden Tee upgrades to convert their cabinets to PGA Tour.
- November 2003 - Championship II adds 5 new courses (including Bay Hill), The upgrade computer, ‘Everlast’, is introduced. Operators can run their own tournaments as well as Global VR tournaments.
- March 2004 - Championship III adds 4 new courses (Kapalua, Coeur d’Alene, Red Mountain Creek, Emerald Dragon) bringing count to 19
  - Introduces World Tour Mode. The top WT players go to the $100,000 North American Championship in Las Vegas.
  - The number of Tournaments are increased to bi-weekly instead of monthly now.
- April 2005 - Challenge Edition brings course number up to 22 (Great White North, Bethpage Black, Edgewood Tahoe, Harbour Town, Pinehurst 2, Sherwood, TPC Avenel, Troon North Monument, Turnberry). Introduces new card readers which utilizes the smart card chip in players card. Adds Game-Face feature and Plus + Points. Also, new dedicated cabinet is offered which has the Everlast computer included.
- 2006 - Team Challenge 2006 brings course count up to 24. Adds team play.
- 2007 - Global VR ends the PGA Golf series due to the expensive licensing agreement with EA Sports as well as years of litigation costs defending against Golden Tee makers in court.
- July 2008 - Tournament support is ended and All-Access Pass is offered in its place, unlocking all 24 courses in Team Challenge without the need for machines to be Tournament Enabled.

== Courses ==
Note: Some courses only available to tournament (online) enabled machines.

Fantasy Courses

- The Greek Isles
- The Great White North
- Red Mountain Creek
- Black Rock Cove
- Emerald Dragon
- The Highlands
- The Predator

Real Courses

- Bethpage Black
- Edgewood Tahoe
- Harbour Town Golf Links
- Pumpkin Ridge
- Coghill
- Pasatiempo Golf Club
- Reflection Bay
- Troon North Golf Club - Monument Course
- Turnberry Golf Club - Ailsa Course
- Bay Hill Club & Lodge
- Coeur d’Alene Resort Course
- Colonial Country Club
- Kapalua Plantation Course
- Sahalee Country Club
- St Andrews Links
- TPC at Sawgrass
- Troon North Golf Club - Pinnacle Course

== Golfers Available ==
- Stuart Appleby
- Retief Goosen
- Nataile Gulbis
- Justin Rose
- John Daly
- Jim Furyk
- Colin Montgomerie
- Vijay Singh

Since the game has the PC version of Tiger Woods Golf embedded within, pros who were unlicensed for the coin-op version can be substituted in place of an existing golfer with simple modifications within the game's files (Tiger Woods, Jack Nicklaus, Ben Hogan, Adam Scott and Jesper Parnevik for example).

== Hardware & Upgrades ==
The series originally launched with a Beige ‘DFI’ computer within. As the series continued, Global VR provided operators with new software on compact discs (to be installed on the computer's hard drive) featuring the latest edition of PGA Tour Golf. The hardware demands for each new edition increased and Global VR provided a computer upgrade option; the superior black ‘Everlast’ computer. Many operators passed on spending on hardware upgrades so subsequent editions of the series may have seen noticeable lag in gameplay as a result.

The DFI computer has a nb32 motherboard with maximum capable processor upgrade of a 2.8 GHz Intel Pentium 4 SL7EY 512/400 MHz socket 478N.

The Everlast computer has a PS35-BL motherboard with a maximum capable processor upgrade of a 3.4 GHz Intel Pentium 4 SL7PP 865/875 socket 478.

Both computers require an AGP (not PCI-e) type video card - Nvidia GeForce 5700 - 7900 is recommended.

Also, both computers will perform better if the onboard memory is increased to 1 GB of RAM or more.

The compatible memory for a DFI is SDRAM pc133 pc100. 512MB per memory stick. There are 3 slots for memory on a DFI motherboard for up to 1.5GB of memory.
