= Majestic (video game) =

- Developer: Anim-X
- Publisher: Electronic Arts
- Platform: Windows
- Release: 24 July 2001: Episode 1; 24 July 2001; Episode 2; 27 August 2001; Episode 3; 4 October 2001; Episode 4; 16 November 2001
- Genre: Alternate reality game

Majestic was one of the first alternate reality games (ARGs), a type of game that blurs the line between in-game and out-of-game experiences. Majestic was created by Neil Young. It debuted on July 24, 2001. While noted for its unusual concept, it did not fare well commercially.

== Gameplay ==
Majestic was a science fiction thriller based on a Majestic 12 shadow government conspiracy theory. As an ARG, the game was played by phone, email, AOL Instant Messenger, BlackBerry messages, fax, and by visiting special websites. Gameplay frequently involved the player receiving clues that they would use to solve puzzles and unravel the story. All the messages were automated, with limited dialogue options, but AIM provided some interactive conversations. As an option to warn unsuspecting members in the same house you could enable a warning at the beginning of each phone call, and a small message on the top of all faxes. When this option was enabled, each phone call would begin with a woman saying "This is a phone call from the video game Majestic", before the regular, prerecorded message. Some of the clues were videos featuring the game's cast. One of the more widely recognized actors was Joe Pantoliano, who portrayed Tim Pritchard in the game's final episode.

The game's tagline, "It plays you", emphasized the nature of ARGs and the game's suspense. One of the first things the player experienced in Majestic was news that the game had stopped, yet they would receive messages suggesting that there was a conspiracy behind the stoppage. Majestic was said to have been inspired by The Game, a 1997 movie that featured something like an ARG which repeatedly confused the main character into thinking he was not playing. This game was also inspired by the "Area 51 caller" on Art Bell's Coast to Coast AM.

The game comprised five episodes: A pilot episode was free to try but the four remaining episodes required players to join EA.com's Platinum Service, which cost $9.95 USD per month. EA discontinued Majestic on April 30, 2002 citing too few players. There were 5 episodes per season. The game was cancelled before season 2 could be released. Retail copies of the game included the game on CD-ROM, a copy of Internet Explorer and AIM, and some bonus music tracks in MP3 format. Also included was the first season's subscription.

The game's interface consisted of a small application named the "Majestic Alliance Application", which served as both a "friends list" (when playing for the first time, the game randomly selected other players who were at the same "level" as player, in game progress, and added them to Majestic Alliance Application as "allies", enabling players to send and receive instant messages to and from other players for help) and to stream music related to what web page or section of the game players were at. Different web pages and different parts of the game triggered different music. The music was broken down into multiple genres such as techno, industrial, and ambient. The game would choose an appropriate genre for a particular section, and stream it. The track played would be random. Certain sections of the game featured the same track, such as the music heard when logging into the game.

The game took place in real time. If a character said that they would contact the player the next day at a particular time, they would. The game was meant to be played casually. In order to keep a player from going through the game's entire content in one day, progress was limited each day. Once a player had accomplished the goals for the day, they were placed on "Standby", in which no progress could be made until they were taken off "Standby".

== Anim-X ==
Anim-X was the name of a fictional video game developer created by Electronic Arts as part of Majestic.

Anim-X was represented In Majestic promotional videos by actors playing the company's two (fictional) lead developers, "Brian Cale" and "Mike Griffin".

The story of the game begins with Cale's death and the destruction of the Anim-X offices. Players then received an email from EA regarding the official shutdown of Majestic's servers. Of course, the shutdown is only part of the game's fictional storyline and the game progresses, with players helping the surviving Anim-X employees to unravel the conspiracies surrounding the game.

== Development ==
A CD-ROM version of the game was in development. EA spent between $2 million and $4 million marketing the game.

== Reception ==
Reception

Review scores
Publication	Score
Computer Games Magazine	2/5
The Electric Playground	6/10

Majestic was a commercial failure. Reportedly, fewer than 13,500 people have subscribed to the game.

Majestic was recognized as the "Best Original Game" at E3 in 2001 and one of the five "Game Innovation Spotlights" at the Game Developers Choice Awards in 2002. IGN questioned some of the suspension of disbelief required by the plot, but praised the ambition of the game, and the large potential it had and scored it 7.5/10.

The editors of PC Gamer US awarded Majestic their 2001 "Most Innovative" prize, and wrote: "When the concepts Majestic pioneered are rekindled in the future, we'll remember it for inspiring a new direction for game developers". The Electric Playground and the Academy of Interactive Arts & Sciences nominated Majestic for their 2001 "Most Innovative Game of the Year" and "Innovation in Computer Gaming" awards, but were ultimately given to Grand Theft Auto III and Black & White, respectively.
