= Nitro Stunt Racing =

2007 video game

- Developer: GameSeed
- Publisher: GameSeed
- Platform: Windows
- Release: December 28, 2007
- Genre: Racing
- Mode: Single-player

Nitro Stunt Racing is a racing game developed and edited by French studio GameSeed in 2007 on PC.

== Gameplay ==
Nitro Stunt Racing invents a new racing discipline: the Formula Jet. The cars, called F-Jet, are equipped with nitro reactors which allow them to make crazy jumps while still being able to control them. Races take place on different track types: Jump, Looping and Super Cross.

The gameplay is half arcade and half simulation, with a complete physics engine. The players can face up to 15 AI opponents on 3 difficulty levels. The game engine manage collides and damages.

5 game modes are proposed:

- Training : Testing and training tracks.
- Arcade : In this mode, damages are disabled.
- Duel : Race against a unique opponent.
- Course : One race against up to 15 opponents.
- Championship : Full Championship.

The game allows the player to share results online, and have an integrated online ranking system.

== Tracks ==
11 tracks are available:

- Loopings: Upside and down track (normal and reverse).
- Jump It Up: The Jump concept (normal and reverse).
- Hot Rusk: SuperCross (normal and reverse).
- Red Run: High speed jump track.
- Hot Rusk: Super Cross (normal and reverse)
- Eagle's park: SuperCross tracks with mad jumps.
- Multiplex: The ultimate track of Group 3, a mix of jumps, SuperCross and aerobatics.

After completing a Championship, the players can race on those tracks in reverse mode (when available).
