= EA Playground =

2007 video game

- Developer: EA Canada
- Publisher: Electronic Arts
- Platforms: Nintendo DS, Wii
- Release: NA: October 23, 2007; EU: November 2, 2007; AU: November 8, 2007
- Genre: Sports game
- Modes: Single-player, multiplayer

EA Playground is a video game for the Nintendo DS and Wii by Electronic Arts. The game is inspired by Wii Sports.

== Gameplay ==
The Wii game features various mini-games structured around a singleplayer "campaign" and a multiplayer party mode. All of the mini-games are based on well known playground games. These include Dodgeball, Tetherball, Slot car racing, paper airplane racing, dart shootout and wall ball. Also included is "Kicks", which is a mix of the sports Soccer and Volleyball (Sepak takraw). More games can be unlocked by progressing through the single player campaign.

The Nintendo DS version of the game includes several exclusive game modes including Spitballs (which uses the microphone input), Bug Hunt, and Skateboarding which takes advantage of the stylus. Again, the games are unlocked by going through the Single Player Campaign. These games can then be played in the Quick Play mode.

After you complete all the games and dares, you can play the (Gauntlet) a game made by the sticker king, Connor. After you beat him, you unlock the sticker king's sticker showing the player's winning emotion. This emotion can also be seen by winning a tourney in multiplayer. (Only Wii version) you can also unlock the sticker king in multi player.

== Included games and version differences ==
Games included in EA Playground
Title	Wii	NDS	Game description
Dart Shootout	Yes	No	Goal: to shoot the targets with sad/mad faces on them to earn points(not the happy faces; those subtract points), shoot people to also earn points, and beat the level boss.
Dodgeball	Yes	Yes	Wii: Goal: to get all the players on your opponent's team out by hitting them with balls. NDS: Using the stylus, you control 3 players on the bottom screen in a game of Dodgeball against AI opponents on the top screen.
Kicks	Yes	Yes	Wii: This game is a mix of soccer and volleyball. You have to kick the ball over the net and into the opponent's goal. NDS: Soccer-inspired game against an AI opponent.
Paper Racers	Yes	No	Goal: to steer a plane through obstacles to the finish line getting power-ups like speed boosts extra time, and sometimes red, green, and blue rings.
Slot Car Racing	Yes	No	Goal: to get to the finish line in first place.
Tetherball	Yes	No	Goal: to smack the ball around the pole so that your opponent can't hit it back while your opponent tries to do the same thing.
Wall Ball	Yes	No	Goal: to hit the ball against the wall through power-ups (for example, warp holes) so that it goes past your opponent. If you do this, you score a point.
Bug Hunt	Yes	Yes	Moving the player with the stylus, collect butterflies and avoid stinging bees for as long as possible.
Hopscotch	No	Yes	Rhythm game where you must reproduce patterns on the court.
Hoops	Yes	Yes	Pick up balls and throw them in the basket, using score multiplier zones to score higher than your AI opponent.
RC Car Racing	Yes	Yes	Top-down racing against 3 AI players. Pickup weapons and turbos on the track.
Skate & Sketch	No	Yes	Join the dots with the stylus to perform tricks on the half-pipe. Increasingly complex shapes must be drawn faster as the game progresses.
Spit Balls	No	Yes	Blow into the microphone (or use the trigger buttons) to fire spit balls at kids in the playground.
Trampoline	No	Yes	Bounce higher than your opponent while avoiding birds and bursting balloons.

== Reception ==
The game received mixed reviews, with the DS version getting slightly better reviews. For the Wii version, IGN gave the game a 6.6/10 rating, saying that it was a passable effort to emulate Wii Sports, praising the marble and stickers system to upgrade abilities along with its presentation, but criticizing the game for its lack of a mini-game as fun or addictive as the Wii Sports ones were. They also gave the DS version a 7.0/10, stating that it was slightly better than the Wii version and that it would appeal better to younger gamers due to it being on the DS.
