= List of Electronic Arts games: 1983–1999 =

Logo used from 1982 to 1999

This is a list of video games published or developed by Electronic Arts. Since 1983 and the 1987 release of its Skate or Die!, it has respectively published and developed games, bundles, as well as a handful of earlier productivity software. Only versions of games developed or published by EA, as well as those versions' years of release, are listed.

Legend
Developed and published by EA
Only published by EA
Only distributed by EA

List of released video games
Title	Release date	Platforms	Developer(s)	Ref(s)
Archon: The Light and the Dark	1983	Amiga	Free Fall Associates	
Archon: The Light and the Dark	1983	Apple II	Free Fall Associates	
Archon: The Light and the Dark	1983	Atari 8-bit	Free Fall Associates	
Archon: The Light and the Dark	1983	Commodore 64	Free Fall Associates	
Archon: The Light and the Dark	1983	IBM PC (self-booting)	Free Fall Associates	
Archon: The Light and the Dark	1983	Macintosh	Free Fall Associates	
Axis Assassin	1983	Apple II	Electronic Arts	
Axis Assassin	1983	Atari 8-bit	Electronic Arts	
Axis Assassin	1983	Commodore 64	Electronic Arts	
D-Bug	1983	Atari 8-bit	ChildWare	
D-Bug	1983	Commodore 64	ChildWare	
Hard Hat Mack	1983	Apple II	Michael Abbot / Matthew Alexander	
Hard Hat Mack	1983	Atari 8-bit	Michael Abbot / Matthew Alexander	
Hard Hat Mack	1983	Commodore 64	Michael Abbot / Matthew Alexander	
Hard Hat Mack	1984	IBM PC (self-booting)	Michael Abbot / Matthew Alexander	
M.U.L.E.	1983	Atari 8-bit	Ozark Softscape	
M.U.L.E.	1983	Commodore 64	Ozark Softscape	
Murder on the Zinderneuf	1983	Apple II	Free Fall Associates	
Murder on the Zinderneuf	1983	Atari 8-bit	Free Fall Associates	
Murder on the Zinderneuf	1983	Commodore 64	Free Fall Associates	
Murder on the Zinderneuf	1983	IBM PC (self-booting)	Free Fall Associates	
One on One: Dr. J vs. Larry Bird	1983	Amiga	Electronic Arts	
One on One: Dr. J vs. Larry Bird	1983	Apple II	Electronic Arts	
One on One: Dr. J vs. Larry Bird	1983	Atari 8-bit	Electronic Arts	
One on One: Dr. J vs. Larry Bird	1983	Commodore 64	Electronic Arts	
One on One: Dr. J vs. Larry Bird	1983	IBM PC (self-booting)	Electronic Arts	
One on One: Dr. J vs. Larry Bird	1983	Macintosh	Electronic Arts	
One on One: Dr. J vs. Larry Bird	1983	Atari 7800	Electronic Arts	
One on One: Dr. J vs. Larry Bird	1983	TRS-80 Color Computer	Electronic Arts	
Pinball Construction Set	1983	Apple II	BudgeCo	
Pinball Construction Set	1983	Atari 8-bit	BudgeCo	
Pinball Construction Set	1983	Commodore 64	BudgeCo	
Pinball Construction Set	1985	IBM PC (self-booting)	BudgeCo	
Pinball Construction Set	1986	Macintosh	BudgeCo	
The Standing Stones	1983	Apple II	Peter Schmuckal / Daniel B. Sommers	
The Standing Stones	1983	Commodore 64	Peter Schmuckal / Daniel B. Sommers	
Worms?	1983	Atari 8-bit	David Maynard	
Worms?	1983	Commodore 64	David Maynard	
Archon II: Adept	1984	Amiga	Free Fall Associates	
Archon II: Adept	1984	Amstrad CPC	Free Fall Associates	
Archon II: Adept	1984	Apple II	Free Fall Associates	
Archon II: Adept	1984	Atari 8-bit	Free Fall Associates	
Archon II: Adept	1984	Commodore 64	Free Fall Associates	
Adventure Construction Set	1984	Commodore 64	Stuart Smith	
Adventure Construction Set	1985	Apple II	Stuart Smith	
Adventure Construction Set	1986	Amiga	Glen Tenney	
Adventure Construction Set	1987	DOS	Stuart Smith	
Mike Edwards' Realm of Impossibility	1984	Apple II	BRAM	
Mike Edwards' Realm of Impossibility	1984	Atari 8-bit	BRAM	
Mike Edwards' Realm of Impossibility	1984	Commodore 64	BRAM	
Music Construction Set	1984	Apple II	Will Harvey / Richard Plom	
Music Construction Set	1984	Atari ST	Will Harvey / Richard Plom	
Music Construction Set	1984	Commodore 64	Will Harvey / Richard Plom	
Music Construction Set	1984	DOS	Will Harvey / Richard Plom	
The Seven Cities of Gold	1984	Apple II	Ozark Softscape	
The Seven Cities of Gold	1984	Atari 8-bit	Ozark Softscape	
The Seven Cities of Gold	1984	Commodore 64	Ozark Softscape	
The Seven Cities of Gold	1985	Amiga	Ozark Softscape	
The Seven Cities of Gold	1985	Macintosh	Ozark Softscape	
The Seven Cities of Gold	1987	DOS	Ozark Softscape	
Skyfox	1984	Apple II	Ray Tobey	
Skyfox	1985	Amstrad CPC	Ray Tobey	
Skyfox	1985	Commodore 64	Ray Tobey	
Skyfox	1985	Macintosh	Ray Tobey	
Skyfox	1986	Amiga	Ray Tobey	
Skyfox	1986	Atari ST	Ray Tobey	
Alternate Reality: The City	1985	Amiga	Philip Price	
Alternate Reality: The City	1985	Apple II	Philip Price	
Alternate Reality: The City	1985	Atari 8-bit	Philip Price	
Alternate Reality: The City	1985	Atari ST	Philip Price	
Alternate Reality: The City	1985	Commodore 64	Philip Price	
Alternate Reality: The City	1985	DOS	Philip Price	
Alternate Reality: The City	1985	Macintosh	Philip Price	
The Bard's Tale	1985	Amiga	Interplay Productions	
The Bard's Tale	1985	Amstrad CPC	Interplay Productions	
The Bard's Tale	1985	Apple II	Interplay Productions	
The Bard's Tale	1985	Apple IIGS	Interplay Productions	
The Bard's Tale	1985	Atari ST	Interplay Productions	
The Bard's Tale	1985	Commodore 64	Interplay Productions	
The Bard's Tale	1985	DOS	Interplay Productions	
The Bard's Tale	1985	Macintosh	Interplay Productions	
The Bard's Tale	1988	ZX Spectrum	Interplay Productions	
Golden Oldies Volume 1: Computer Software Classics	1985	Apple II	The Software Toolworks	
Golden Oldies Volume 1: Computer Software Classics	1985	Atari ST	The Software Toolworks	
Golden Oldies Volume 1: Computer Software Classics	1985	Commodore 64	The Software Toolworks	
Golden Oldies Volume 1: Computer Software Classics	1985	DOS	The Software Toolworks	
Heart of Africa	1985	Commodore 64	Ozark Softscape	
Lords of Conquest	1985	Apple II	Eon Software	
Lords of Conquest	1985	Atari 8-bit	Eon Software	
Lords of Conquest	1985	Atari ST	Eon Software	
Lords of Conquest	1985	Commodore 64	Eon Software	
Lords of Conquest	1985	DOS	Eon Software	
Mail Order Monsters	1985	Atari 8-bit	Paul Reiche III / Evan Robinson / Nicky Robinson	
Mail Order Monsters	1985	Commodore 64	Paul Reiche III / Evan Robinson / Nicky Robinson	
Racing Destruction Set	1985	Atari 8-bit	Rick Koenig	
Racing Destruction Set	1985	Commodore 64	Rick Koenig	
Richard Petty's Talladega	1985	Commodore 64	Cosmi	
Robot Rascals	1986	Apple II	Ozark Softscape	
Robot Rascals	1986	Commodore 64	Ozark Softscape	
Robot Rascals	1986	DOS	Ozark Softscape	
Starflight	1986	DOS	Binary Systems	
Starflight	1989	Amiga	Binary Systems	
Starflight	1989	Commodore 64	Binary Systems	
Starflight	1990	Atari ST	Binary Systems	
Starflight	1990	Macintosh	Binary Systems	
Starflight	May 15, 1991	Sega Genesis/Mega Drive	Binary Systems	
Super Boulder Dash	1986	Apple II	First Star Software	
Super Boulder Dash	1986	Atari 8-bit	First Star Software	
Super Boulder Dash	1986	Commodore 64	First Star Software	
Super Boulder Dash	1986	IBM PC (self-booting)	First Star Software	
Timothy Leary's Mind Mirror	1986	Apple II	Futique, Inc.	
Timothy Leary's Mind Mirror	1986	Commodore 64	Futique, Inc.	
Timothy Leary's Mind Mirror	1986	DOS	Futique, Inc.	
Touchdown Football	1986	Atari 8-bit	Imagic	
Touchdown Football	1986	Commodore 64	Imagic	
Touchdown Football	1986	DOS	Imagic	
Ultimate Wizard	1986	Commodore 64	Progressive Peripherals and Software / Electronic Arts	
World Tour Golf	1986	Amiga	Evan Robinson / Nicky Robinson / Paul Reiche III	
World Tour Golf	1986	Apple II	Evan Robinson / Nicky Robinson / Paul Reiche III	
World Tour Golf	1986	Commodore 64	Evan Robinson / Nicky Robinson / Paul Reiche III	
World Tour Golf	1986	DOS	Evan Robinson / Nicky Robinson / Paul Reiche III	
Age of Adventure	1986	Apple II	Electronic Arts	
Age of Adventure	1986	Atari 8-bit	Electronic Arts	
Age of Adventure	1986	Commodore 64	Electronic Arts	
Amnesia	1986	Apple II	Cognetics Corporation	
Amnesia	1986	IBM PC (self-booting)	Cognetics Corporation	
Amnesia	1987	Commodore 64	Cognetics Corporation	
Arcticfox	1986	Amiga	Dynamix	
Arcticfox	1986	Apple II	Dynamix	
Arcticfox	1986	Atari ST	Dynamix	
Arcticfox	1986	Commodore 64	Dynamix	
Arcticfox	1986	DOS	Dynamix	
Arcticfox	1986	ZX Spectrum	Dynamix	
The Bard's Tale II: The Destiny Knight	1986	Commodore 64	Interplay Productions	
The Bard's Tale II: The Destiny Knight	1987	Apple II	Interplay Productions	
The Bard's Tale II: The Destiny Knight	1988	Amiga	Interplay Productions	
The Bard's Tale II: The Destiny Knight	1988	Apple IIGS	Interplay Productions	
The Bard's Tale II: The Destiny Knight	1988	DOS	Interplay Productions	
Dan Dare: Pilot of the Future	1986	Commodore 128	Gang of Five	
Dan Dare: Pilot of the Future	1986	Commodore 64	Gang of Five	
Deluxe Music Construction Set	1986	Amiga	Geoff Brown	
Deluxe Music Construction Set	1986	Atari ST	Geoff Brown	
Instant Music	1986	Amiga	Electronic Arts	
Instant Music	1986	Apple IIGS	Electronic Arts	
Instant Music	1986	Commodore 64	Electronic Arts	
Movie maker	1985	Commodore 64	Electronic Arts	
Movie maker	1985	Apple IIGS	Electronic Arts	
Movie maker	1985	Commodore 64	Electronic Arts	
Make Your Own Murder Party	1986	Apple II	Trans Fiction Systems	
Make Your Own Murder Party	1986	Commodore 64	Trans Fiction Systems	
Make Your Own Murder Party	1986	DOS	Trans Fiction Systems	
Marble Madness	1986	Amiga	Mark Cerny	
Marble Madness	1986	Apple II	Mark Cerny	
Marble Madness	1986	Atari ST	Mark Cerny	
Marble Madness	1986	Commodore 64	Mark Cerny	
Marble Madness	1986	DOS	Mark Cerny	
Marble Madness	1991	Sega Genesis/Mega Drive	Mark Cerny	
Patton Versus Rommel	1986	Macintosh	Chris Crawford	
Patton Versus Rommel	1987	Commodore 64	Sculptured Software	
Patton Versus Rommel	1987	DOS	Sculptured Software	
PHM Pegasus	1986	Amstrad CPC	Lucasfilm Games	
PHM Pegasus	1986	Apple II	Lucasfilm Games	
PHM Pegasus	1986	Commodore 64	Lucasfilm Games	
PHM Pegasus	1986	ZX Spectrum	Lucasfilm Games	
PHM Pegasus	1988	DOS	Lucasfilm Games	
Radio Baseball	1986	DOS	Diamond Edge Software	
Chuck Yeager's Advanced Flight Trainer	1987	Amstrad CPC	Lerner Research	
Chuck Yeager's Advanced Flight Trainer	1987	Apple II	Lerner Research	
Chuck Yeager's Advanced Flight Trainer	1987	Commodore 64	Lerner Research	
Chuck Yeager's Advanced Flight Trainer	1987	DOS	Lerner Research	
Chuck Yeager's Advanced Flight Trainer	1987	ZX Spectrum	Lerner Research	
Deathlord	1987	Apple II	Electronic Arts	
Deathlord	1987	Commodore 64	Electronic Arts	
Earl Weaver Baseball	1987	Amiga	Don Daglow / Eddie Dombrower	
Earl Weaver Baseball	1987	Apple II	Don Daglow / Eddie Dombrower	
Earl Weaver Baseball	1987	DOS	Don Daglow / Eddie Dombrower	
Earth Orbit Stations	1987	Apple II	Karl Buiter	
Earth Orbit Stations	1987	Commodore 64	Karl Buiter	
Earth Orbit Stations	1987	Macintosh	Karl Buiter	
Game Over II (Note: Game Over II was published by Electronic Arts in the United Kingdom. In other countries, it was published by Dinamic Software.)	1987	Amstrad CPC	Dinamic Software	
Game Over II	1987	Atari ST	Dinamic Software	
Game Over II	1987	Commodore 64	Dinamic Software	
Game Over II	1987	DOS	Dinamic Software	
Game Over II	1987	MSX	Dinamic Software	
Game Over II	1987	ZX Spectrum	Dinamic Software	
Legacy of the Ancients	1987	Apple II	Quest Software, Inc.	
Legacy of the Ancients	1987	Commodore 64	Quest Software, Inc.	
Legacy of the Ancients	1987	DOS	Quest Software, Inc.	
Questmaster I: The Prism of Heheutotol	1987	DOS	MicroIllusions	
Skyfox II: The Cygnus Conflict	1987	Commodore 64	Dynamix	
Skyfox II: The Cygnus Conflict	1988	Amiga	Dynamix	
Skyfox II: The Cygnus Conflict	1988	DOS	Dynamix	
Skyfox II: The Cygnus Conflict	1989	Atari ST	Dynamix	
Tomahawk	1987	Atari 8-bit	Digital Integration	
Tomahawk	1987	Commodore 64	Digital Integration	
Skate or Die! (Note: The NES version of Skate or Die! was published by Konami.)	October 1987	Amstrad CPC	Electronic Arts	
Skate or Die!	October 1987	Apple II	Electronic Arts	
Skate or Die!	October 1987	Atari ST	Electronic Arts	
Skate or Die!	October 1987	Commodore 64	Electronic Arts	
Skate or Die!	October 1987	DOS	Electronic Arts	
Skate or Die!	October 1987	ZX Spectrum	Electronic Arts	
Wasteland	January 2, 1988	Apple II	Interplay Productions	
Wasteland	January 2, 1988	Commodore 64	Interplay Productions	
Wasteland	January 2, 1988	DOS	Interplay Productions	
Aaargh! (Note: Aaargh! was published by Electronic Arts for the Amiga only. Other versions were released by Arcadia Systems and Melbourne House.)	1988	Amiga	Binary Design / Sculptured Software	
Abrams Battle Tank (Note: Abrams Battle Tank was published by Electronic Arts for the MS-DOS only. The Sega Mega Drive version was released by Sega.)	1988	DOS	Dynamix	
The Bard's Tale III: Thief of Fate	1988	Apple II	Interplay Productions	
The Bard's Tale III: Thief of Fate	1988	Commodore 64	Interplay Productions	
The Bard's Tale III: Thief of Fate	1990	DOS	Interplay Productions	
The Bard's Tale III: Thief of Fate	1991	Amiga	Interplay Productions	
Caveman Ughlympics (Note: The NES version of Caveman Ughlympics was published by Data East as Caveman Games.)	1988	Commodore 64	Dynamix	
Caveman Ughlympics	1989	DOS	Dynamix	
F/A 18 Interceptor	1988	Amiga	Intellisoft	
Ferrari Formula One	1988	Amiga	Electronic Arts / Imagitec Design Inc.	
Ferrari Formula One	1988	Atari ST	Electronic Arts / Imagitec Design Inc.	
Ferrari Formula One	1988	Commodore 64	Electronic Arts / Imagitec Design Inc.	
Ferrari Formula One	1988	DOS	Electronic Arts / Imagitec Design Inc.	
Fusion	1988	Amiga	Bullfrog Productions	
Fusion	1988	Atari ST	Bullfrog Productions	
John Madden Football	June 1, 1988	Apple II	Bethesda Softworks	
John Madden Football	1989	Commodore 64	Rob Johnson	
John Madden Football	1989	DOS	Robin Antonick / John Friedman	
Kings of the Beach	1988	Commodore 64	Electronic Arts	
Kings of the Beach	1988	DOS	Electronic Arts	
Mars Saga	1988	Commodore 64	Westwood Associates	
Modem Wars	1988	Commodore 64	Ozark Softscape	
Modem Wars	1988	DOS	Ozark Softscape	
Powerdrome	1988	Amiga	Michael Powell	
Powerdrome	1989	Atari ST	Michael Powell	
Powerdrome	1990	DOS	Michael Powell	
Powerplay Hockey	1988	Commodore 64	Electronic Arts	
Rack 'Em	1988	Commodore 64	Artech Digital Entertainments, Inc.	
Sentinel Worlds I: Future Magic	1988	Commodore 64	Karl Buiter	
Sentinel Worlds I: Future Magic	1988	DOS	Karl Buiter	
Serve & Volley (Note: Other versions of Serve & Volley were released by Accolade.)	1988	Commodore 64	Artech D.E. Inc	
TKO	1988	Commodore 64	Accolade	
The Train: Escape to Normandy (Note: Other versions of The Train: Escape to Normandy were published by Accolade.)	1988	Amstrad CPC	Artech Digital Entertainment	
The Train: Escape to Normandy	1988	Commodore 64	Artech Digital Entertainment	
Vixen	1988	ZX Spectrum	Intelligent Design	
Zany Golf	1988	Amiga	Sandcastle Productions	
Zany Golf	1988	Apple II	Sandcastle Productions	
Zany Golf	1988	Atari ST	Sandcastle Productions	
Zany Golf	1988	DOS	Sandcastle Productions	
Zany Golf	1988	Sega Genesis/Mega Drive	Sandcastle Productions	
SimCity	February 2, 1989	Numerous platforms	Maxis	
Populous	June 5, 1989	Amiga	Bullfrog Productions	
Populous	June 5, 1989	Atari ST	Bullfrog Productions	
Populous	June 5, 1989	DOS	Bullfrog Productions	
Populous	June 5, 1989	Sega Genesis/Mega Drive	Bullfrog Productions	
688 Attack Sub	1989	DOS	Electronic Arts	
688 Attack Sub	1990	Amiga	Electronic Arts	
688 Attack Sub	July 1991	Sega Genesis/Mega Drive	MicroProse	
The Archon Collection	1989	Amiga	Free Fall Associates	
Budokan: The Martial Spirit	1989	Amiga	Electronic Arts	
Budokan: The Martial Spirit	1989	Amstrad CPC	Electronic Arts	
Budokan: The Martial Spirit	1989	Commodore 64	Electronic Arts	
Budokan: The Martial Spirit	1989	DOS	Electronic Arts	
Budokan: The Martial Spirit	1989	ZX Spectrum	Electronic Arts	
Budokan: The Martial Spirit	1990	Sega Genesis/Mega Drive	Electronic Arts	
Cartooners	1989	Apple IIGS	Electronic Arts	
Cartooners	1989	DOS	Electronic Arts	
Chuck Yeager's Advanced Flight Trainer 2.0	1989	Amiga	Lerner Research	
Chuck Yeager's Advanced Flight Trainer 2.0	1989	Atari ST	Lerner Research	
Chuck Yeager's Advanced Flight Trainer 2.0	1989	DOS	Lerner Research	
F-16 Combat Pilot (Note: EA only published the DOS version of F-16 Combat Pilot, though it was released for other platforms.)	1989	DOS	Black Box	
Fire King	1989	Commodore 64	Strategic Studies Group	
Fire King	1989	DOS	Strategic Studies Group	
The Hound of Shadow	1989	Amiga	Eldritch Games	
The Hound of Shadow	1989	Atari ST	Eldritch Games	
The Hound of Shadow	1989	DOS	Eldritch Games	
Indianapolis 500: The Simulation	1989	DOS	Papyrus	
Indianapolis 500: The Simulation	1990	Amiga	Papyrus	
Keef the Thief	1989	Amiga	Naughty Dog	
Keef the Thief	1989	DOS	Naughty Dog	
Lakers versus Celtics and the NBA Playoffs	1989	DOS	Electronic Arts	
Lakers versus Celtics and the NBA Playoffs	1990	Sega Genesis/Mega Drive	Electronic Arts	
Panzer Battles	1989	Amiga	SSG Strategic Studies	
Populous: The Final Frontier	1989	Amiga	Bullfrog Productions	
Populous: The Final Frontier	1989	Atari ST	Bullfrog Productions	
Populous: The Promised Lands	1989	Amiga	Bullfrog Productions	
Populous: The Promised Lands	1989	Atari ST	Bullfrog Productions	
Populous: The Promised Lands	1989	DOS	Bullfrog Productions	
Project Firestart	1989	Commodore 64	Dynamix	
Shadow of the Beast (Note: Other versions of Shadow of the Beast were released by Psygnosis.)	1989	Sega Genesis/Mega Drive	Reflections Interactive	
Starflight 2: Trade Routes of the Cloud Nebula	1989	DOS	Binary Systems	
Starflight 2: Trade Routes of the Cloud Nebula	1991	Amiga	MicroMagic	
Starflight 2: Trade Routes of the Cloud Nebula	1991	Apple II	MicroMagic	
The Untouchables	1989	Commodore 64	Ocean Software	
Flood	June 1990	Amiga	Bullfrog Productions	
Flood	June 1990	Atari ST	Bullfrog Productions	
The Immortal	November 1990	Amiga	Sandcastle	
The Immortal	November 1990	Apple II	Sandcastle	
The Immortal	November 1990	Atari ST	Sandcastle	
The Immortal	November 1990	DOS	Sandcastle	
The Immortal	November 1990	Nintendo Entertainment System	Sandcastle	
The Immortal	July 11, 1991	Sega Genesis/Mega Drive	Sandcastle	
John Madden Football	December 1990	Sega Genesis/Mega Drive	Park Place Productions	
John Madden Football	November 1991	Super Nintendo Entertainment System	Park Place Productions	
John Madden Football	December 1992	Amiga	Park Place Productions	
The Bard's Tale Trilogy	1990	DOS	Interplay Productions	
Battle Squadron	1990	Sega Genesis/Mega Drive	Cope-Com	
Centurion: Defender of Rome	1990	Amiga	Bits of Magic	
Centurion: Defender of Rome	1990	DOS	Bits of Magic	
Centurion: Defender of Rome	1991	Sega Genesis/Mega Drive	Bits of Magic	
Escape from Hell	1990	DOS	Electronic Arts	
Fountain of Dreams	1990	DOS	Electronic Arts	
Hard Nova	1990	Amiga	Malibu Interactive	
Hard Nova	1990	Atari ST	Malibu Interactive	
Hard Nova	1990	DOS	Malibu Interactive	
Imperium	1990	Amiga	The Intelligent Games Co.	
Imperium	1990	Atari ST	The Intelligent Games Co.	
Imperium	1990	DOS	The Intelligent Games Co.	
LHX Attack Chopper	1990	DOS	Electronic Arts	
LHX Attack Chopper	1992	Sega Genesis/Mega Drive	Electronic Arts	
Low Blow	1990	DOS	Synergistic Software	
Powermonger	1990	Amiga	Bullfrog Productions	
Powermonger	1990	Atari ST	Bullfrog Productions	
Powermonger	1992	DOS	Bullfrog Productions	
Powermonger	1992	Sega Genesis/Mega Drive	Bullfrog Productions	
Powermonger	1994	Macintosh	Bullfrog Productions	
Powermonger	1994	Sega CD	Bullfrog Productions	
Projectyle	1990	Amiga	Eldritch the Cat	
Projectyle	1990	Atari ST	Eldritch the Cat	
Shadow of the Beast II (Note: Other versions of Shadow of the Beast II were released by Psygnosis.)	1990	Sega Genesis/Mega Drive	Reflections Interactive	
Skate or Die 2: The Search for Double Trouble	1990	Nintendo Entertainment System	Electronic Arts	
Ski or Die	1990	Amiga	Electronic Arts	
Ski or Die	1990	Commodore 64	Electronic Arts	
Ski or Die	1990	DOS	Electronic Arts	
Sword of Sodan	1990	Sega Genesis/Mega Drive	Innerprise	
King's Bounty	February 21, 1991	Sega Genesis/Mega Drive	New World Computing	
Populous II: Trials of the Olympian Gods	August 31, 1991	Amiga	Bullfrog Productions	
Populous II: Trials of the Olympian Gods	August 31, 1991	Atari ST	Bullfrog Productions	
Populous II: Trials of the Olympian Gods	August 31, 1991	DOS	Bullfrog Productions	
Populous II: Trials of the Olympian Gods	August 31, 1991	Sega Genesis/Mega Drive	Bullfrog Productions	
Road Rash (1991)	September 1991	Sega Genesis/Mega Drive	Electronic Arts	
Road Rash (1991)	December 1992	Amiga	Peakstar Software	
Are We There Yet?	1991	DOS	Manley & Associates, Inc.	
The Bard's Tale Construction Set	1991	Amiga	Interplay Productions	
The Bard's Tale Construction Set	1991	DOS	Interplay Productions	
Battle Chess II: Chinese Chess	1991	Amiga	Interplay Entertainment	
Battle Chess II: Chinese Chess	1991	DOS	Interplay Entertainment	
Birds of Prey	1991	Amiga	Argonaut Games	
Birds of Prey	1991	DOS	Argonaut Games	
Bulls vs Lakers and the NBA Playoffs	1991	Sega Genesis/Mega Drive	Electronic Arts	
Chuck Yeager's Air Combat	1991	DOS	Brent Iverson	
Chuck Yeager's Air Combat	1991	Macintosh	Brent Iverson	
Dark Castle	1991	Sega Genesis/Mega Drive	Silicon Beach Software	
Earl Weaver Baseball II	1991	DOS	Don Daglow / Eddie Dombrower	
F-22 Interceptor	1991	Sega Genesis/Mega Drive	Lerner Research	
The Faery Tale Adventure: Book I	1991	Sega Genesis/Mega Drive	MicroIllusions	
Fatal Rewind	1991	Sega Genesis/Mega Drive	Raising Hell Software	
James Pond: Underwater Agent (Note: The Amiga version of this game was released by Millennium Interactive.)	1991	Sega Genesis/Mega Drive	Millennium Interactive	
James Pond 2: Codename: RoboCod	1991	Sega Genesis/Mega Drive	Millennium Interactive / Vectordean	
John Madden Football '92	1991	Sega Genesis/Mega Drive	Electronic Arts	
Lotus Turbo Challenge 2	1991	Sega Genesis/Mega Drive	Magnetic Fields	
The Magic Candle II: The Four and Forty	1991	DOS	Mindcraft Software	
Might and Magic II: Gates to Another World (Note: Might and Magic II for other platforms was published by New World Computing.)	1991	Sega Genesis/Mega Drive	New World Computing	
NHL Hockey	1991	Sega Genesis/Mega Drive	Park Place Productions	
PGA Tour Golf	1991	Amiga	Sterling Silver Software	
PGA Tour Golf	1991	DOS	Sterling Silver Software	
PGA Tour Golf	1991	Sega Genesis/Mega Drive	Sterling Silver Software	
PGA Tour Golf	March 1992	Super Nintendo Entertainment System	Sterling Silver Software	
Powermonger: World War 1 Edition	1991	Amiga	Bullfrog Productions	
Powermonger: World War 1 Edition	1991	Atari ST	Bullfrog Productions	
Rampart	1991	DOS	Bitmasters	
Rampart	1991	Super Nintendo Entertainment System	Bitmasters	
Rings of Power	January 1992	Sega Genesis/Mega Drive	Naughty Dog	
Desert Strike: Return to the Gulf	February 1992	Amiga	Electronic Arts	
Desert Strike: Return to the Gulf	February 1992	Macintosh	Electronic Arts	
Desert Strike: Return to the Gulf	February 1992	Game Gear	Electronic Arts	
Desert Strike: Return to the Gulf	February 1992	Sega Genesis/Mega Drive	Electronic Arts	
Desert Strike: Return to the Gulf	February 1992	Super Nintendo Entertainment System	Electronic Arts	
NHLPA Hockey '93	September 1992	Sega Genesis/Mega Drive	Park Place Productions	
NHLPA Hockey '93	December 1992	Super Nintendo Entertainment System	Park Place Productions	
Road Rash II	December 1992	Sega Genesis/Mega Drive	Electronic Arts	
Grand Slam Bridge II	1992	DOS	Presage Software	
Air Land Sea	1992	Amiga	Electronic Arts	
The Aquatic Games	1992	Sega Genesis/Mega Drive	Millennium Interactive	
Black Crypt	1992	Amiga	Raven Software	
Bulls vs. Blazers and the NBA Playoffs	1992	Super Nintendo Entertainment System	Electronic Arts	
Bulls vs. Blazers and the NBA Playoffs	1993	Sega Genesis/Mega Drive	Electronic Arts	
Car and Driver	1992	DOS	Lerner Research	
Crüe Ball	1992	Sega Genesis/Mega Drive	NuFX	
Daughter of Serpents	1992	DOS	Eldritch Games	
Galahad	1992	Sega Genesis/Mega Drive	Traveller's Tales	
Heroes of the 357th	1992	DOS	Midnight Software	
Hong Kong Mahjong	1992	DOS	Nine Dragons Software	
John Madden Football '93	1992	Sega Genesis/Mega Drive	Blue Sky Productions	
John Madden Football '93	1992	Super Nintendo Entertainment System	Electronic Arts	
The Lost Files of Sherlock Holmes	1992	DOS	Mythos Software	
The Lost Files of Sherlock Holmes	1994	3DO	Mythos Software	
Lotus: The Ultimate Challenge	1992	Sega Genesis/Mega Drive	Magnetic Fields	
The Magic Candle III	1992	DOS	Mindcraft Software	
PGA Tour Golf II	1992	Sega Genesis/Mega Drive	Polygon Games	
Risky Woods	1992	Amiga	Dinamic Software / Zeus Software	
Risky Woods	1992	Atari ST	Dinamic Software / Zeus Software	
Risky Woods	1992	DOS	Dinamic Software / Zeus Software	
Risky Woods	1992	Sega Genesis/Mega Drive	Dinamic Software / Zeus Software	
Rolo to the Rescue	1992	Sega Genesis/Mega Drive	Vectordean	
Team USA Basketball	1992	Sega Genesis/Mega Drive	Electronic Arts	
Ultima Underworld II: Labyrinth of Worlds	January 1993	DOS	LookingGlass Technologies / Origin Systems	
Ultima Underworld II: Labyrinth of Worlds	January 1993	FM Towns	LookingGlass Technologies / Origin Systems	
Ultima Underworld II: Labyrinth of Worlds	January 1993	PC-98	LookingGlass Technologies / Origin Systems	
Harley's Humongous Adventure (Note: Electronic Arts funded Harley's Humongous Adventure.)	February 1993	Super Nintendo Entertainment System	Visual Concepts	
Ultrabots	March 1993	DOS	Novalogic	
Ultima VII, Part Two: The Silver Seed	March 25, 1993	DOS	Origin Systems	
The Labyrinth of Time	June 1, 1993	Amiga CD32	Terra Nova Development	
The Labyrinth of Time	June 1, 1993	DOS	Terra Nova Development	
The Labyrinth of Time	June 1, 1993	Macintosh	Terra Nova Development	
SEAL Team	June 1, 1993	DOS	Electronic Arts	
Syndicate	June 6, 1993	Amiga	Bullfrog Productions / Ocean Software	
Syndicate	June 6, 1993	DOS	Bullfrog Productions / Ocean Software	
Syndicate	June 6, 1993	Sega Genesis/Mega Drive	Bullfrog Productions / Ocean Software	
Super Baseball 2020	September 24, 1993	Sega Genesis/Mega Drive	NuFX	
General Chaos	August 15, 1993	Sega Genesis/Mega Drive	Game Refuge Inc.	
Madden NFL '94	November 19, 1993	Sega Genesis/Mega Drive	Visual Concepts / High Score Productions	
Madden NFL '94	November 19, 1993	Super Nintendo Entertainment System	Visual Concepts / High Score Productions	
Kasparov's Gambit	November 1993	DOS	Heuristic Software	
FIFA International Soccer	December 15, 1993	Sega Genesis/Mega Drive	Extended Play Productions	
FIFA International Soccer	1994	3DO	Extended Play Productions	
FIFA International Soccer	1994	Amiga	Extended Play Productions	
FIFA International Soccer	1994	DOS	Creative Assembly	
FIFA International Soccer	1994	Game Gear	Extended Play Productions	
FIFA International Soccer	1994	Sega CD	Extended Play Productions	
FIFA International Soccer	1994	Super Nintendo Entertainment System	Extended Play Productions	
Bill Walsh College Football	1993	Sega CD	Electronic Arts / Visual Concepts	
Bill Walsh College Football	1993	Sega Genesis/Mega Drive	Electronic Arts / Visual Concepts	
Bill Walsh College Football	1993	Super Nintendo Entertainment System	Electronic Arts / Visual Concepts	
Blades of Vengeance	1993	Sega Genesis/Mega Drive	Beam Software	
B.O.B.	1993	Sega Genesis/Mega Drive	Foley Hi-Tech Systems	
B.O.B.	June 1993	Super Nintendo Entertainment System	Gray Matter Inc.	
Escape from Monster Manor	1993	3DO	Studio 3DO	
F-117 Night Storm	1993	Sega Genesis/Mega Drive	Electronic Arts	
Haunting Starring Polterguy	1993	Sega Genesis/Mega Drive	Electronic Arts	
James Pond 3: Operation Starfish	1993	Amiga	Millennium Interactive / Vectordean	
James Pond 3: Operation Starfish	1993	Sega Genesis/Mega Drive	Millennium Interactive / Vectordean	
Jungle Strike	1993	Sega Genesis/Mega Drive	High Score Productions / Granite Bay Software	
Jungle Strike	1993	Super Nintendo Entertainment System	High Score Productions / Granite Bay Software	
Jungle Strike	1994	Amiga	High Score Productions / Granite Bay Software	
Jungle Strike	1995	DOS	High Score Productions / Granite Bay Software	
Jungle Strike	1995	Game Gear	High Score Productions / Granite Bay Software	
Michael Jordan in Flight	1993	DOS	Electronic Arts	
Mutant League Football	1993	Sega Genesis/Mega Drive	Electronic Arts	
NBA Showdown	1993	Super Nintendo Entertainment System	Electronic Arts	
NBA Showdown	June 21, 1994	Sega Genesis/Mega Drive	Electronic Arts	
NHL Hockey 94	1993	DOS	Park Place Productions	
NHL Hockey 94	1993	Sega CD	High Score Productions	
NHL Hockey 94	October 1993	Sega Genesis/Mega Drive	High Score Productions	
NHL Hockey 94	October 1993	Super Nintendo Entertainment System	EA Canada	
Peter Pan: A Story Painting Adventure	1993	DOS	Novotrade	
SimCity 2000	1993	Numerous platforms	Maxis	
Space Hulk	1993	Amiga	Electronic Arts	
Space Hulk	June 1993	DOS		
Strike Commander	April 1993	DOS	Origin Systems	
Syndicate: American Revolt	1993	Amiga	Bullfrog Productions	
Syndicate: American Revolt	1993	DOS	Bullfrog Productions	
Syndicate: American Revolt	1993	Sega Genesis/Mega Drive	Bullfrog Productions	
Technoclash	1993	Sega Genesis/Mega Drive	Zono	
Tony La Russa Baseball	1993	Sega Genesis/Mega Drive	Beyond Software, Inc.	
Virtual Pinball	1993	Sega Genesis/Mega Drive	Bill Budge	
Wing Commander: Privateer	October 9, 1993	DOS	Origin Systems	
Cyberia	December 2, 1994	DOS	Xatrix Entertainment	
Cyberia	1995	Sega Saturn	Xatrix Entertainment	
Cyberia	January 26, 1996	3DO	Xatrix Entertainment	
Cyberia	January 1996	PlayStation	Xatrix Entertainment	
Skitchin'	March 1994	Sega Genesis/Mega Drive	EA Canada	
Urban Strike	March 4, 1994	Sega Genesis/Mega Drive	Granite Bay Software / The Edge / Foley Hi-Tech	
Ultima VIII: Pagan	March 15, 1994	DOS	Origin Systems	
John Madden Football	May 6, 1994	3DO	High Score Productions	
Bill Walsh College Football '95	June 1, 1994	Sega Genesis/Mega Drive	High Score Productions	
Theme Park	June 1994	3DO	Bullfrog Productions	
Theme Park	June 1994	Amiga	Bullfrog Productions	
Theme Park	June 1994	DOS	Bullfrog Productions	
Theme Park	October 30, 1995	PlayStation	Krisalis Software	
Theme Park	October 30, 1995	Sega Saturn	Krisalis Software	
Theme Park	1995	Macintosh	Bullfrog Productions	
Theme Park	1995	Sega Genesis/Mega Drive	Bullfrog Productions	
Shockwave Assault (a.k.a. Shockwave)	June 27, 1994	3DO	Advanced Technology Group	
Shockwave Assault (a.k.a. Shockwave)	December 15, 1995	Macintosh	Advanced Technology Group	
Shockwave Assault (a.k.a. Shockwave)	December 15, 1995	PlayStation	Advanced Technology Group	
Shockwave Assault (a.k.a. Shockwave)	December 15, 1995	Windows	Advanced Technology Group	
Shockwave Assault (a.k.a. Shockwave)	August 26, 1996	Sega Saturn	Advanced Technology Group	
Road Rash (1994)	July 1994	3DO	Monkey Do Productions	
Road Rash (1994)	March 1995	Sega CD	Monkey Do Productions	
Road Rash (1994)	February 1996	PlayStation	Buzz Puppet Productions	
Road Rash (1994)	August 1996	Sega Saturn	Buzz Puppet Productions	
Road Rash (1994)	October 10, 1996	Windows	Buzz Puppet Productions	
The Need for Speed	August 31, 1994	3DO	EA Canada	
The Need for Speed	August 31, 1995	DOS	EA Canada	
The Need for Speed	March 20, 1996	PlayStation	EA Canada	
The Need for Speed	June 1996	Sega Saturn	EA Canada	
The Need for Speed	June 28, 1996	Windows	EA Canada	
Wing Commander: Armada	September 22, 1994	DOS	Origin Systems	
NBA Live 95	October 1994	Sega Genesis/Mega Drive	Hitmen Productions	
NBA Live 95	1994	Super Nintendo Entertainment System	Hitmen Productions	
NBA Live 95	1995	DOS	Hitmen Productions	
Relentless: Twinsen's Adventure	October 1994	DOS	Adeline Software International	
Relentless: Twinsen's Adventure	July 19, 1996	PlayStation	Adeline Software International	
Shaq Fu	October 28, 1994	Sega Genesis/Mega Drive	Delphine Software International	
Shaq Fu	1994	Super Nintendo Entertainment System	Delphine Software International	
Shaq Fu	1995	Game Gear	Tiertex Design Studios	
FIFA Soccer 95	November 10, 1994	Sega Genesis/Mega Drive	Extended Play Productions	
Madden NFL '95	November 18, 1994	Sega Genesis/Mega Drive	Visual Concepts	
Madden NFL '95	November 1994	Super Nintendo Entertainment System	High Score Productions	
U.S. Navy Fighters	November 19, 1994	DOS	Electronic Arts	
Michael Jordan: Chaos in the Windy City (Note: The game was published by Ocean Software in Europe.)	November 21, 1994	Super Nintendo Entertainment System	Electronic Arts	
La Russa Baseball '95	1994	Sega Genesis/Mega Drive	Beyond Software, Inc.	
Magic Carpet	1994	DOS	Bullfrog Productions	
Magic Carpet	1996	PlayStation	Bullfrog Productions	
Magic Carpet	1996	Sega Saturn	Bullfrog Productions	
Mario Andretti Racing	1994	Sega Genesis/Mega Drive	Stormfront Studios	
Mutant League Hockey	1994	Sega Genesis/Mega Drive	Electronic Arts	
The Complete Ultima VII	1994	DOS	Origin Systems	
NHL 95	1994	DOS	EA Sports	
NHL 95	1994	Game Gear	Realtime Associates	
NHL 95	September 21, 1994	Sega Genesis/Mega Drive	High Score Productions	
NHL 95	November 1994	Super Nintendo Entertainment System	Visual Concepts	
Noctropolis	1994	DOS	Flashpoint Productions	
Pacific Strike	1994	DOS	Origin Systems	
Pacific Strike Speech Pack	1994	DOS	Origin Systems	
PGA European Tour	1994	Amiga	Electronic Arts	
PGA European Tour	1994	Amiga CD32	Electronic Arts	
PGA European Tour	1994	Sega Genesis/Mega Drive	Electronic Arts	
PGA European Tour	1994	Windows	Electronic Arts	
PGA Tour Golf III	1994	Sega Genesis/Mega Drive	Hitmen Productions	
PGA Tour Golf 486	1994	DOS	Hitmen Productions	
Rugby World Cup '95	1994	DOS	Electronic Arts UK	
Rugby World Cup '95	1994	Sega Genesis/Mega Drive	Electronic Arts UK	
ShadowCaster	1994	DOS	Raven Software	
Twin Calibre: 688 Attack Sub + Chuck Yeager's Air Combat	1994	DOS	Electronic Arts	
Wings of Glory	1994	DOS	Origin Systems	
3D Atlas	February 17, 1995	3DO	Electronic Arts	
Triple Play Baseball '96	March 18, 1995	Sega Genesis/Mega Drive	Extended Play	
BioForge	March 29, 1995	DOS	Origin Systems	
Road Rash 3	April 1995	Sega Genesis/Mega Drive	Monkey Do Productions	
Shockwave: Operation Jumpgate	May 19, 1995	3DO	Advanced Technology Group	
CyberMage: Darklight Awakening	June 15, 1995	DOS	Origin Systems	
College Football USA 96	July 15, 1995	Sega Genesis/Mega Drive	High Score Productions	
Hi-Octane	August 1995	DOS	Bullfrog Productions	
Hi-Octane	December 29, 1995	PlayStation	Bullfrog Productions	
Hi-Octane	December 1995	Sega Saturn	Bullfrog Productions	
Crusader: No Remorse	August 31, 1995	DOS	Origin Systems / Realtime Associates	
Crusader: No Remorse	May 26, 1997	PlayStation	Origin Systems / Realtime Associates	
Crusader: No Remorse	May 26, 1997	Sega Saturn	Origin Systems / Realtime Associates	
Alone in the Dark 2 (Note: Alone in the Dark 2 was published by Electronic Arts in Japan only for the 3DO, the PlayStation and Sega Saturn.)	September 8, 1995	3DO	Krisalis	
Alone in the Dark 2	February 23, 1996	Sega Saturn	Krisalis	
Alone in the Dark 2	November 8, 1996	PlayStation	Krisalis	
Immercenary	September 22, 1995	3DO	5 Miles Out	
FIFA Soccer 96	September 30, 1995	DOS	Extended Play Productions	
FIFA Soccer 96	September 30, 1995	Windows	Extended Play Productions	
FIFA Soccer 96	November 1995	PlayStation	Extended Play Productions	
FIFA Soccer 96	November 1995	Sega 32X	Extended Play Productions	
FIFA Soccer 96	November 1995	Sega Genesis/Mega Drive	Extended Play Productions	
FIFA Soccer 96	November 1995	Sega Saturn	Extended Play Productions	
FIFA Soccer 96	November 1995	Super Nintendo Entertainment System	Probe Entertainment	
NHL 96	October 6, 1995	DOS	EA Canada	
NHL 96	October 6, 1995	Sega Genesis/Mega Drive	High Score Productions	
NHL 96	October 6, 1995	Super Nintendo Entertainment System	EA Tiburon	
NBA Live 96	October 1995	Sega Genesis/Mega Drive	Hitmen Productions	
NBA Live 96	1995	Super Nintendo Entertainment System	Hitmen Productions	
NBA Live 96	December 31, 1995	DOS	EA Canada	
NBA Live 96	March 1996	PlayStation	EA Canada	
Madden NFL '96	November 10, 1995	Sega Genesis/Mega Drive	Tiburon Entertainment / High Score Productions	
Madden NFL '96	1995	Super Nintendo Entertainment System	Tiburon Entertainment / High Score Productions	
Viewpoint	November 28, 1995	PlayStation	Visual Concepts	
Psychic Detective	November 30, 1995	DOS	Colossal Pictures / Electronic Arts	
Psychic Detective	March 1, 1996	PlayStation	Colossal Pictures / Electronic Arts	
Psychic Detective	1996	3DO	Colossal Pictures / Electronic Arts	
The Essential Selection: Sport	December 1, 1995	DOS	MicroProse Software, Inc.	
ARL 96	1995	DOS	Creative Assembly	
ARL 96	1995	Windows	Creative Assembly	
Australian Rugby League	1995	Sega Genesis/Mega Drive	I-Space Interactive	
Bloodwings: Pumpkinhead's Revenge	1995	DOS	BAP Interactive	
Extreme Pinball	1995	DOS	Epic MegaGames / Digital Extremes / High Score Entertainment	
Extreme Pinball	March 28, 1996	PlayStation	Epic MegaGames / Digital Extremes / High Score Entertainment	
Fade to Black	1995	DOS	Delphine Software International	
Fade to Black	June 28, 1996	PlayStation	Delphine Software International	
Foes of Ali	1995	3DO	Gray Matter Inc.	
Magic Carpet 2: The Netherworlds	1995	DOS	Bullfrog Productions	
Magic Carpet: Hidden Worlds	1995	DOS	Bullfrog Productions	
Magic Carpet Plus	1995	DOS	Bullfrog Productions	
Marine Fighters	1995	DOS	Electronic Arts	
PGA Tour 96	1995	Sega Genesis/Mega Drive	NuFX	
PGA Tour 96	September 1995	PlayStation	Hitmen Productions	
PGA Tour 96	November 1995	3DO Interactive Multiplayer	NuFX	
PGA Tour 96	1996	Super Nintendo Entertainment System	Polygames	
Shockwave 2: Beyond the Gate	1995	3DO	Advanced Technology Group	
Space Hulk: Vengeance of the Blood Angels	1995	3DO	Key Game	
Space Hulk: Vengeance of the Blood Angels	January 7, 1996	PlayStation	Key Game	
Space Hulk: Vengeance of the Blood Angels	1996	Sega Saturn	Key Game	
Space Hulk: Vengeance of the Blood Angels	1996	Windows	Key Game	
Toughman Contest	1995	Sega 32X	High Score Productions / Visual Concepts	
Toughman Contest	1995	Sega Genesis/Mega Drive	High Score Productions / Visual Concepts	
Coach K College Basketball	1995	Sega Genesis/Mega Drive	Electronic Arts	
Loaded (Note: Electronic Arts Victor published Loaded in Japan. Interplay Productions published the game in North America.)	March 15, 1996	PlayStation	Gremlin Interactive	
Loaded	March 15, 1996	Sega Saturn	Gremlin Interactive	
AFL Final Fever	June 9, 1996	Windows	Blue Tongue Entertainment	
Triple Play 97	June 24, 1996	DOS	EA Canada	
Triple Play 97	June 24, 1996	PlayStation	EA Canada	
Triple Play 97	June 24, 1996	Windows	EA Canada	
Madden NFL 97	August 15, 1996	PlayStation	EA Tiburon	
Madden NFL 97	August 31, 1996	Windows	EA Tiburon	
Madden NFL 97	September 24, 1996	Sega Saturn	EA Tiburon	
Madden NFL 97	October 1996	Sega Genesis/Mega Drive	EA Tiburon	
Madden NFL 97	October 1996	Super Nintendo Entertainment System	EA Tiburon	
NHL 97	August 31, 1996	DOS	EA Canada	
NHL 97	August 31, 1996	Windows	EA Canada	
NHL 97	1996	Sega Genesis/Mega Drive	High Score Productions	
NHL 97	October 1996	Super Nintendo Entertainment System	Ceris Software	
NHL 97	November 12, 1996	PlayStation	Visual Concepts	
NHL 97	December 4, 1996	Sega Saturn	Visual Concepts	
Crusader: No Regret	September 9, 1996	DOS	Origin Systems	
Crusader: No Regret	September 9, 1996	Macintosh	Origin Systems	
Crusader: No Regret	September 9, 1996	Windows	Origin Systems	
The Lost Files of Sherlock Holmes: The Case of the Rose Tattoo	September 27, 1996	DOS	Mythos Software	
Genewars	September 30, 1996	DOS	Bullfrog Productions	
Genewars	September 30, 1996	Windows	Bullfrog Productions	
PGA Tour 97	September 30, 1996	PlayStation	EA Sports	
PGA Tour 97	November 30, 1996	Sega Saturn	EA Sports	
Krazy Ivan (Note: This game was published in Japan by Electronic Arts and in other territories by Psygnosis.)	October 4, 1996	PlayStation	Psygnosis	
FIFA 97 (Note: The game was re-released in a compilation published by Europress Software called Total Sports for Microsoft Windows.)	October 31, 1996	DOS	EA Canada / Extended Play Productions	
FIFA 97	October 31, 1996	Windows	EA Canada / Extended Play Productions	
FIFA 97	November 30, 1996	PlayStation	EA Canada / Extended Play Productions	
FIFA 97	1996	Sega Genesis/Mega Drive	XYZ Productions	
FIFA 97	1996	Super Nintendo Entertainment System	Rage Software	
FIFA 97	1997	Sega Saturn	Perfect Entertainment	
NBA Live 97	October 31, 1996	PlayStation	EA Canada	
NBA Live 97	December 1996	Sega Genesis/Mega Drive	NuFX/Hitmen Productions	
NBA Live 97	December 31, 1996	DOS	EA Sports	
NBA Live 97	1996	Super Nintendo Entertainment System	NuFX/Hitmen Productions	
NBA Live 97	December 31, 1996	Windows	EA Canada	
NBA Live 97	1997	Sega Saturn	Realtime Associates	
Soviet Strike	October 31, 1996	PlayStation	Electronic Arts	
Soviet Strike	November 1, 1996	Sega Saturn	Electronic Arts	
Syndicate Wars	October 31, 1996	DOS	Electronic Arts	
Syndicate Wars	July 31, 1997	PlayStation	Electronic Arts	
Die Hard Trilogy (Note: Die Hard Trilogy was published by Electronic Arts in Japan only for the PlayStation, while other versions were published by Fox Interactive and Sega.)	December 13, 1996	PlayStation	Probe Entertainment	
Andretti Racing	1996	PlayStation	High Score Productions / Stormfront Studios	
Andretti Racing	1996	Sega Saturn	High Score Productions / Stormfront Studios	
Andretti Racing	1997	Windows	High Score Productions / Stormfront Studios	
Clandestiny	1996	Windows	Trilobyte	
Cricket 96	1996	DOS	Beam Software	
Fire Fight	1996	Windows	Chaos Works	
Jane's Combat Simulations: Advanced Tactical Fighters	1996	DOS	Electronic Arts	
Jane's Combat Simulations: Advanced Tactical Fighters	1997	Windows	Electronic Arts	
Jane's Combat Simulations: Advanced Tactical Fighters – Nato Fighters	1996	DOS	Electronic Arts	
Jane's Combat Simulations: Advanced Tactical Fighters – Nato Fighters	1997	Windows	Electronic Arts	
Jane's Combat Simulations: AH-64D Longbow	1996	DOS	Origin Systems	
Jane's Combat Simulations: AH-64D Longbow	1997	Windows	Origin Systems	
Jane's Combat Simulations: AH-64D Longbow: Flash Point Korea	1996	DOS	Origin Systems	
Jane's Combat Simulations: AH-64D Longbow: Flash Point Korea	1997	Windows	Origin Systems	
Jane's Combat Simulations: AH-64D Longbow Limited Edition	1996	DOS	Origin Systems	
Jane's Combat Simulations: AH-64D Longbow Limited Edition	1997	Windows	Origin Systems	
Need for Speed: Special Edition, The	1996	DOS	EA Canada	
Need for Speed: Special Edition, The	1996	Windows	EA Canada	
Sesame Street: Get Set to Learn	1996	Windows	Creative Wonders / Children's Television Workshop	
Wing Commander IV: The Price of Freedom	February 12, 1996	DOS	Origin Systems	
Wing Commander IV: The Price of Freedom	February 12, 1996	Macintosh		
Wing Commander IV: The Price of Freedom	February 12, 1996	Windows		
Wing Commander IV: The Price of Freedom	May 14, 1997	PlayStation		
Privateer 2: The Darkening	November 30, 1996	DOS	Origin Systems	
FIFA 64	March 1, 1997	Nintendo 64	EA Canada	
KKnD: Krush, Kill 'n' Destroy	March 5, 1997	DOS	Beam Software	
Ultima Underworld: The Stygian Abyss	March 14, 1997	PlayStation	Blue Sky Productions / Origin Systems	
Darklight Conflict	March 28, 1997	DOS	Rage Software	
Darklight Conflict	March 28, 1997	Windows	Rage Software	
Darklight Conflict	June 30, 1997	PlayStation	Rage Software	
Darklight Conflict	1997	Sega Saturn	Rage Software	
Theme Hospital	March 28, 1997	DOS	Bullfrog Productions	
Theme Hospital	March 28, 1997	Windows	Bullfrog Productions	
Theme Hospital	February 1998	PlayStation	Krisalis Software	
Need for Speed II	March 31, 1997	PlayStation	EA Canada	
Need for Speed II	April 18, 1997	Windows	EA Seattle	
Triple Play 98	May 14, 1997	PlayStation	EA Canada	
Triple Play 98	May 14, 1997	Windows	EA Canada	
OverBlood	May 22, 1997	PlayStation	Riverhillsoft	
College Football USA 97	June 1, 1997	Sega Genesis/Mega Drive	High Score Productions	
FIFA: Road to World Cup 98	June 17, 1997	Windows	EA Canada / Extended Play Productions	
FIFA: Road to World Cup 98	November 7, 1997	PlayStation	EA Canada	
FIFA: Road to World Cup 98	November 30, 1997	Nintendo 64	EA Canada	
FIFA: Road to World Cup 98	December 17, 1997	Sega Saturn	Climax Development	
FIFA: Road to World Cup 98	1997	Sega Genesis/Mega Drive	XYZ Productions	
FIFA: Road to World Cup 98	1997	Super Nintendo Entertainment System	XYZ Productions	
NBA Live 98	June 17, 1997	Super Nintendo Entertainment System	Tiertex Design Studios	
NBA Live 98	July 1, 1997	Sega Genesis/Mega Drive	Tiertex Design Studios	
NBA Live 98	October 31, 1997	Windows	EA Canada	
NBA Live 98	November 30, 1997	PlayStation	EA Canada	
NBA Live 98	December 17, 1997	Sega Saturn	Realtime Associates	
Dungeon Keeper	June 26, 1997	DOS	Bullfrog Productions	
Dungeon Keeper	June 26, 1997	Windows	Bullfrog Productions	
Jane's Combat Simulations – 688(I) Hunter/Killer	June 30, 1997	Windows	Sonalysts, Inc.	
Madden NFL 98	July 31, 1997	PlayStation	Tiburon Entertainment	
Madden NFL 98	1997	Sega Genesis/Mega Drive	Tiburon Entertainment	
Madden NFL 98	August 26, 1997	Sega Saturn	Tiburon Entertainment	
Madden NFL 98	October 31, 1997	Windows	Tiburon Entertainment	
Madden NFL 98	November 1997	Super Nintendo Entertainment System	Tiburon Entertainment	
NCAA Football 98	July 31, 1997	PlayStation	EA Tiburon	
NCAA Football 98	September 30, 1997	Windows	EA Tiburon	
Ultima Online	September 24, 1997	Windows	Origin Systems	
Test Drive 4	September 30, 1997	PlayStation	Pitbull Syndicate (Japan only)	
Sid Meier's Gettysburg!	October 14, 1997	Windows	Firaxis Games	
The Lost World: Jurassic Park	August 27, 1997	PlayStation	DreamWorks Interactive	
Nuclear Strike	August 31, 1997	PlayStation	Electronic Arts	
Nuclear Strike	September 29, 1997	Windows	Electronic Arts	
Moto Racer	September 3, 1997	Windows	SK Software International	
Moto Racer	November 30, 1997	PlayStation	SK Software International	
PGA Tour 98	September 27, 1997	PlayStation	NuFX	
Galapagos	October 15, 1997	Macintosh	Anark Game Studios	
Galapagos	October 15, 1997	Windows	Anark Game Studios	
Need for Speed II: Special Edition	October 29, 1997	Windows	EA Seattle	
KKnD: Krush Kill 'n' Destroy Xtreme	October 30, 1997	Windows	Beam Software	
Madden Football 64	October 31, 1997	Nintendo 64	EA Tiburon	
NASCAR 98	November 1997	PlayStation	Stormfront Studios	
NASCAR 98	November 13, 1997	Sega Saturn	Stormfront Studios	
V-Rally	November 4, 1997	PlayStation	Infogrames Multimedia (North America only)	
Dungeon Keeper: The Deeper Dungeons	November 26, 1997	Windows	Bullfrog Productions	
Wing Commander: Prophecy	December 11, 1997	Windows	Origin Systems	
AFL 98	1997	Windows	Electronic Arts	
Beasts and Bumpkins	1997	Windows	Worldweaver Ltd	
Cricket 97	1997	DOS	Beam Software	
Cricket 97	1997	Windows	Beam Software	
FIFA Soccer Manager	1997	Windows	EA UK	
Jane's Combat Simulations: Fighters Anthology	1997	Windows	Electronic Arts	
Jane's Combat Simulations: Longbow 2	1997	Windows	Origin Systems	
Jane's Combat Simulations: Longbow Gold	1997	DOS	Origin Systems	
Jane's Combat Simulations: Longbow Gold	1997	Windows	Origin Systems	
Jane's Combat Simulations: U.S. Navy Fighters '97	1997	Windows	Electronic Arts	
NHL 98	1997	Sega Genesis/Mega Drive	EA Canada	
NHL 98	August 31, 1997	PlayStation	EA Canada	
NHL 98	September 30, 1997	Windows	EA Canada	
NHL 98	December 1997	Super Nintendo Entertainment System	EA Canada	
NHL 98	January 14, 1998	Sega Saturn	EA Canada	
Pax Corpus	1997	PlayStation	Cryo Interactive Entertainment	
PGA Tour Pro	1997	Windows	EA Sports	
SCARAB	1997	Windows	Electronic Arts	
Auto Destruct	January 1998	PlayStation	Neurostone	
Skullmonkeys	January 31, 1998	PlayStation	The Neverhood, Inc. / DreamWorks Interactive	
Ultima Collection	February 17, 1998	DOS	Origin Systems	
Ultima Collection	February 17, 1998	Windows	Origin Systems	
ReBoot	February 28, 1998	PlayStation	EA Canada	
Diablo	March 1998	PlayStation	Blizzard North	
SimSafari	March 19, 1998	Windows	Maxis	
Jane's Combat Simulations: F-15	March 25, 1998	Windows	EA Baltimore	
Need for Speed III: Hot Pursuit	March 25, 1998	PlayStation	EA Canada	
Need for Speed III: Hot Pursuit	September 23, 1998	Windows	EA Seattle	
Triple Play 99	March 26, 1998	PlayStation	EA Canada	
Triple Play 99	March 26, 1998	Windows	EA Canada	
Warhammer: Dark Omen	March 31, 1998	Windows	Mindscape / Games Workshop	
Warhammer: Dark Omen	April 7, 1998	PlayStation	Mindscape / Games Workshop	
World Cup 98	March 31, 1998	PlayStation	EA Canada	
World Cup 98	April 30, 1998	Windows	EA Canada	
World Cup 98	May 18, 1998	Nintendo 64	EA Canada	
Dungeon Keeper Gold	April 27, 1998	Windows	Bullfrog Productions	
Road Rash 3D	May 31, 1998	PlayStation	Electronic Arts	
WarGames (Note: Electronic Arts only published WarGames in Europe; other versions were published by MGM Interactive.)	June 30, 1998	PlayStation	Interactive Studios	
WarGames	July 31, 1998	Windows	Interactive Studios	
Moto Racer 2	July 21, 1998	PlayStation	Delphine Software International	
Moto Racer 2	November 24, 1998	Windows	Delphine Software International	
Madden NFL 99	July 31, 1998	PlayStation	EA Tiburon	
Madden NFL 99	September 1998	Nintendo 64	EA Tiburon	
Madden NFL 99	September 30, 1998	Windows	EA Tiburon	
NCAA Football 99	August 1, 1998	PlayStation	EA Sports	
NCAA Football 99	August 31, 1998	Windows	EA Sports	
Future Cop: LAPD	August 31, 1998	PlayStation	EA Redwood Shores	
Future Cop: LAPD	November 25, 1998	Macintosh	EA Redwood Shores	
Future Cop: LAPD	November 25, 1998	Windows	EA Redwood Shores	
Tiger Woods 99 PGA Tour Golf	August 31, 1998	Windows	Adrenalin Entertainment	
Tiger Woods 99 PGA Tour Golf	October 31, 1998	PlayStation	Adrenalin Entertainment	
NASCAR 99	September 11, 1998	Nintendo 64	EA Sports / Stormfront Studios	
NASCAR 99	September 28, 1998	PlayStation	EA Sports / Stormfront Studios	
NHL 99	September 30, 1998	PlayStation	EA Canada	
NHL 99	September 30, 1998	Windows	EA Canada	
NHL 99	October 1, 1998	Nintendo 64	EA Canada	
Small Soldiers	September 30, 1998	PlayStation	DreamWorks Interactive	
Test Drive 5	September 30, 1998	PlayStation	Pitbull Syndicate (Japan only)	
CyberTiger	September 30, 1999	PlayStation	EA Redwood Shores	
Xena: Warrior Princess	October 7, 1999	PlayStation	Universal Studios Digital Arts	
Fighter Pilot	October 15, 1998	Windows	Charybdis Enterprises	
Jurassic Park: Trespasser	October 28, 1998	Windows	DreamWorks Interactive	
The F.A. Premier League Football Manager 2000	October 29, 1999	Windows	EA UK	
FIFA 99	October 31, 1998	Windows	EA Canada	
FIFA 99	November 30, 1998	Nintendo 64	EA Canada	
FIFA 99	November 30, 1998	PlayStation	EA Canada	
NBA Live 99	October 31, 1998	PlayStation	EA Canada	
NBA Live 99	October 31, 1998	Windows	EA Canada	
NBA Live 99	November 4, 1998	Nintendo 64	NuFX	
Theme Park World	November 3, 1999	Windows	Bullfrog Productions / Climax Development	
Populous: The Beginning	November 17, 1998	Windows	Bullfrog Productions	
Populous: The Beginning	March 31, 1999	PlayStation	Bullfrog Productions	
Jane's Combat Simulations: WWII Fighters	November 23, 1998	Windows	Electronic Arts	
Knockout Kings	November 25, 1998	PlayStation	Digital Eclipse Software	
Knockout Kings	December 1999	Game Boy Color	High Score Entertainment / Press Start Inc.	
Golden Nugget 64	December 1, 1998	Nintendo 64	Westwood Studios	
Theme Aquarium	December 17, 1998	PlayStation	Tose	
AFL 99	1998	PlayStation	Electronic Arts	
AFL 99	1998	Windows	Electronic Arts	
Best of Voodoo	1998	Windows	Electronic Arts	
The Biggest Names the Best Games	1998	Windows	Electronic Arts	
Bundesliga 99	1998	Windows	EA Canada	
The Creed	1999	Windows	Insomnia Entertainment	
The F.A. Premier League Football Manager 99	1998	Windows	EA UK	
Jane's Combat Simulations: Attack Pack	1998	DOS	Electronic Arts	
Jane's Combat Simulations: Attack Pack	1998	Windows	Electronic Arts	
Jane's Combat Simulations: Israeli Air Force	1998	Windows	Pixel Multimedia	
Jane's Combat Simulations: Longbow Anthology	1998	DOS	Origin Systems	
Jane's Combat Simulations: Longbow Anthology	1998	Windows	Origin Systems	
PGA Tour Gold	1998	Windows	Electronic Arts	
Play the Games Vol. 1	1998	DOS	Namco Bandai Entertainment / Infogrames	
Play the Games Vol. 1	1998	Windows	Namco Bandai Entertainment / Infogrames	
Queen: The eYe	1998	DOS	Destination Design	
Queen: The eYe	1998	Windows	Destination Design	
Ultimate Sim	1998	Windows	Electronic Arts	
X Games Pro Boarder	1998	PlayStation	Radical Entertainment	
X Games Pro Boarder	1998	Windows	Radical Entertainment	
SimCity 3000	February 1, 1999	Linux	Maxis	
SimCity 3000	February 1, 1999	Macintosh	Maxis	
SimCity 3000	February 1, 1999	Windows	Maxis	
Sid Meier's Alpha Centauri	February 12, 1999	Windows	Firaxis Games	
NASCAR Revolution	February 16, 1999	Windows	Stormfront Studios	
Beetle Adventure Racing!	February 28, 1999	Nintendo 64	Paradigm Entertainment	
Triple Play 2000	February 28, 1999	Nintendo 64	Treyarch	
Triple Play 2000	March 22, 1999	PlayStation	Treyarch	
Triple Play 2000	March 31, 1999	Windows	Treyarch	
Need for Speed: High Stakes	March 1, 1999	PlayStation	EA Canada	
Need for Speed: High Stakes	June 1, 1999	Windows	EA Seattle	
Lands of Lore III	March 3, 1999	Windows	Westwood Studios	
Rushdown	March 3, 1999	PlayStation	Canal+	
Recoil	March 11, 1999	Windows	Zipper Interactive / Westwood Studios	
Sports Car GT	March 31, 1999	PlayStation	Image Space Incorporated	
Sports Car GT	April 30, 1999	Windows	Image Space Incorporated	
Superbikes '99	April 10, 1999	Windows	Milestone srl	
Hot Wheels Turbo Racing	May 11, 1999	Nintendo 64	Stormfront Studios	
Hot Wheels Turbo Racing	May 11, 1999	PlayStation	Stormfront Studios	
Jane's Combat Simulations: Fleet Command	May 15, 1999	Windows	Sonalysts Combat Simulations	
F-22 Lightning 3	May 20, 1999	Windows	NovaLogic	
NASCAR Road Racing	May 26, 1999	Windows	Electronic Arts	
NCAA Football 2000	June 30, 1999	PlayStation	EA Sports	
V-Rally 2	June 30, 1999	PlayStation	Eden Studios	
Dungeon Keeper 2	July 7, 1999	Windows	Bullfrog Productions	
Skydive!	July 7, 1999	Windows	Gonzo Games	
Madden NFL 2000	July 31, 1999	PlayStation	EA Tiburon	
Madden NFL 2000	August 1999	Game Boy Color	EA Tiburon	
Madden NFL 2000	August 31, 1999	Nintendo 64	EA Tiburon	
Madden NFL 2000	August 31, 1999	Windows	EA Tiburon	
Madden NFL 2000	November 16, 1999	Macintosh	EA Tiburon	
Sled Storm	July 31, 1999	PlayStation	EA Canada	
NHL 2000	August 31, 1999	PlayStation	EA Canada	
NHL 2000	September 30, 1999	Windows	EA Canada	
System Shock 2	August 11, 1999	Windows	Irrational Games / Looking Glass Studios	
Flight Unlimited III	September 17, 1999	Windows	Looking Glass Studios	
WCW Mayhem	September 21, 1999	Nintendo 64	Kodiak Interactive	
WCW Mayhem	August 31, 1999	PlayStation	Kodiak Interactive	
NASCAR 2000	September 24, 1999	PlayStation	EA Sports / Stormfront Studios	
NASCAR 2000	September 30, 1999	Nintendo 64	EA Sports / Stormfront Studios	
FIFA 2000	September 30, 1999	Windows	EA Canada	
FIFA 2000	October 9, 1999	PlayStation	EA Canada	
Deer Hunt Challenge	October 19, 1999	Windows	EA Seattle / Inland Productions, Inc.	
Sid Meier's Alien Crossfire	October 19, 1999	Windows	Firaxis Games	
Dune 2000	October 31, 1999	PlayStation	Intelligent Games / Westwood Studios	
Medal of Honor	October 31, 1999	PlayStation	DreamWorks Interactive	
NBA Live 2000	October 31, 1999	Nintendo 64	NuFX	
NBA Live 2000	October 31, 1999	PlayStation	EA Canada	
NBA Live 2000	October 31, 1999	Windows	EA Canada	
Supercross 2000	October 31, 1999	Nintendo 64	MBL Research	
Supercross 2000	October 31, 1999	PlayStation	MBL Research	
Delta Force 2	November 3, 1999	Windows	NovaLogic	
Tomorrow Never Dies	November 16, 1999	PlayStation	Black Ops Entertainment	
Ultima IX: Ascension	November 23, 1999	Windows	Origin Systems	
Tiger Woods PGA Tour 2000	November 30, 1999	PlayStation	EA Redwood Shores	
Sid Meier's Antietam!	December 10, 1999	Windows	Firaxis Games / BreakAway Games	
The Biggest Names the Best Games 2	1999	Windows	Electronic Arts	
The Biggest Names the Best Games 4	1999	Windows	Electronic Arts	
Cricket World Cup 99	1999	Windows	Creative Assembly	
Jane's Combat Simulations: USAF	1999	Windows	Pixel Multimedia	
Knockout Kings 2000	1999	Nintendo 64	Black Ops Entertainment	
Knockout Kings 2000	1999	PlayStation	Electronic Arts	
Play the Games Vol. 2	1999	DOS	Infogrames / Eidos Interactive	
Play the Games Vol. 2	1999	Windows	Infogrames / Eidos Interactive	
Populous: The Beginning: Undiscovered Worlds	1999	Windows	Bullfrog Productions	
Street Sk8er	1999	PlayStation	Atelier Double	
The F.A. Premier League Stars	1999	PlayStation	EA UK	
The F.A. Premier League Stars	August 13, 1999	Windows	EA UK	

== See also ==
- List of Electronic Arts games
- List of Electronic Arts games: 2000–2009
- List of Electronic Arts games: 2010–2019
- List of Electronic Arts games: 2020–present
