= Galápagos (disambiguation) =

The Galápagos Islands are an island archipelago in the Pacific Ocean, part of Ecuador.

Galápagos can also refer to:

- Galápagos Province, the province in Ecuador containing the islands
- Galápagos National Park, the national park established by the government of Ecuador to protect the Islands
- Galapagos (film), a 1955 travel and nature documentary film
- Galápagos (novel), a 1985 novel by American author Kurt Vonnegut
- Galápagos (2006 TV series), a British nature documentary miniseries
- Galapagos (2017 TV series), a British nature documentary miniseries
- Galápagos, Guadalajara, municipality of the province of Guadalajara, Spain
- Galapagos penguin
- Galápagos tortoise
- Galapagos (video game), a 1997 computer game by Electronic Arts
- Galápagos syndrome, the phenomenon of a product or a society evolving in isolation from globalization
- Galapagos NV, a Belgian pharmaceutical company.
- Galápagos Microplate
- Avianca Ecuador's callsign.

== See also ==
- "Galapogos", a song by The Smashing Pumpkins from the 1995 album Mellon Collie and the Infinite Sadness
