= List of Electronic Arts games =

Since 1983 and the 1987 release of its Skate or Die!, Electronic Arts has respectively developed and published video games, bundles, as well as a handful of earlier productivity software. Only versions of games developed or published by EA, as well as those versions years of release, are listed.

== Sections ==
- List of Electronic Arts games: 1983–1999
- List of Electronic Arts games: 2000–2009
- List of Electronic Arts games: 2010–2019
- List of Electronic Arts games: 2020–present

== Franchises ==
Legend
Developed and published by EA (including major divisions, like EA Sports)
Only developed by EA
Only published by EA (including EA Sports)
Only distributed by EA
Only published by other companies before EA
Only published by other companies accompanied by EA's subsidiaries or a game where its franchise is licensed by EA

Electronic Arts franchises
Franchise	First game	Released	Latest game	Released	Ref.
Alice	American McGee's Alice	2000	Alice: Madness Returns	2011	
Army of Two	Army of Two	2008	Army of Two: The Devil's Cartel	2013	
Battlefield	Battlefield 1942	2002	Battlefield 6	2025	
Bejeweled (mobile)	Bejeweled Classic	2011	Bejeweled Stars	2016	
Boom Blox	Boom Blox	2008	Boom Blox Bash Party	2009	
Burnout	Burnout	2001	Burnout Paradise Remastered	2018	
Colin McRae Rally and Dirt	Colin McRae Rally	1998	WRC 24	2023	
Command & Conquer	Command & Conquer	1995	Command & Conquer Remastered Collection	2020	
Cricket	Cricket 96	1995	Cricket 07	2006	
Dead Space	Dead Space	2008	Dead Space (Remake)	2023	
Dragon Age	Dragon Age: Origins	2009	Dragon Age: The Veilguard	2024	
Dungeon Keeper	Dungeon Keeper	1997	Dungeon Keeper (mobile)	2014	
F1	F1 2000	2000	F1 25	2025	
FIFA / FC	FIFA International Soccer	1993	FC 26	2025	
FIFA Manager	FIFA Soccer Manager	1997	FIFA Manager 14	2013	
Fight Night	Fight Night 2004	2004	Fight Night Champion	2011	
GRID	Race Driver: Grid	2008	GRID Legends	2022	
Hasbro Family Game Night	Hasbro Family Game Night	2008	Hasbro Family Game Night: The Game Show	2011	
Knockout Kings	Knockout Kings 99	1998	Knockout Kings 2003	2002	
Madden NFL	John Madden Football	1988	Madden NFL 25	2024	
Mass Effect	Mass Effect	2007	Mass Effect Legendary Edition	2021	
Medal of Honor	Medal of Honor	1999	Medal of Honor: Above and Beyond	2020	
Mercenaries	Mercenaries: Playground of Destruction	2005	Mercenaries 2: World in Flames	2008	
Mirror's Edge	Mirror's Edge	2008	Mirror's Edge Catalyst	2016	
MVP Baseball/Triple Play	Triple Play Baseball '96	1995	MVP Baseball Online	2014	
NASCAR	NASCAR 98	1997	NASCAR Kart Racing	2009	
NBA Live	NBA Live 95	1994	NBA Live 19	2018	
NBA Street	NBA Street	2001	NBA Street Homecourt	2007	
NCAA Basketball	NCAA March Madness 98	1998	NCAA Basketball 10	2009	
NCAA/College Football	Bill Walsh College Football	1993	EA Sports College Football 26	2025	
Need for Speed	The Need for Speed	1994	Need for Speed Unbound	2022	
NFL Street	NFL Street	2004	NFL Street 3	2006	
NHL	NHL Hockey	1991	NHL 25	2024	
Peggle	Peggle	2007	Peggle Blast	2020	
PGA Tour	PGA Tour Golf	1990	EA Sports PGA Tour	2023	
Plants vs. Zombies	Plants vs. Zombies	2009	Plants vs. Zombies: Battle for Neighborville	2019	
Populous	Populous	1989	Populous DS	2008	
Real Racing	Real Racing	2009	Real Racing 3	2013	
Road Rash	Road Rash	1991	Road Rash (Java)	2009	
Rock Band	Rock Band	2007	Rock Band Reloaded	2010	
SimCity	SimCity	1989	SimCity: BuildIt	2014	
Skate	Skate	2007	Skate	2025	
SSX	SSX	2000	SSX	2012	
Spore	Spore	2008	Darkspore	2011	
Strike	Desert Strike	1992	Nuclear Strike	1997	
Super Mega Baseball	Super Mega Baseball	2014	Super Mega Baseball 4	2023	
Syndicate	Syndicate	1993	Syndicate (remake)	2012	
The Sims	The Sims	2000	The Sims 4: Royalty & Legacy	2026	
Titanfall	Titanfall	2014	Titanfall: Assault	2017	
UFC	EA Sports UFC	2014	EA Sports UFC 5	2023	
Ultima	Ultima I: The First Age of Darkness	1981	Ultima Forever: Quest for the Avatar	2013	
Wing Commander	Wing Commander	1990	Wing Commander Arena	2007	
