= Innerprise Software =

Former video game developer and publisher

- Industry: Retail
- Founded: 1989
- Founder: Paul Lombardi, Torben B. Larsen
- Defunct: 1992
- Headquarters: Baltimore, Maryland, United States
- Products: Video game industry Interactive entertainment

Innerprise Software Inc, was an American video game developer and publisher located in Baltimore, Maryland, United States. The company was founded in 1989 and went out of business in 1992. During the company's existence Innerprise Software managed to publish titles for the Amiga and Sega Genesis in North America and Europe.

== Video games ==
Title	Year	Platform	Region
Nightdawn	1989	Amiga	North America
Persian Gulf Inferno	1989	Amiga	North America
Battle Squadron	1989	Amiga	North America
Plague	1990	Amiga	Europe
Globulus	1990	Amiga	Europe
Cyberblast	1990	Amiga	North America
Battle Squadron	1990	Sega Genesis	North America
Turrican	1990	Commodore 64, Amiga	North America
Ms. Pac-Man	1991	Sega Genesis	North America
Sword of Sodan	1991	Sega Genesis	North America
Battle Squadron	1991	Amiga	Europe
