= Persian Gulf Inferno =

1989 video game

- Developer(s): Parsec Software
- Publisher(s): Innerprise Software
- Platform(s): Amiga; Atari ST; Commodore 64
- Release: 1989
- Genre(s): Action-adventure
- Mode(s): Single-player

Persian Gulf Inferno (titled The Persian Gulf Inferno on the game's title screen) is a side-scrolling action-adventure game released for the Amiga in 1989, and the Atari ST and Commodore 64 in 1990.

== Development ==
The game was originally designed and developed by a Danish team of Amiga programmers called Parsec. Team members were Kevin Mikkelsen, Allan Pedersen and Jim Rankenberg.
