= Hybris (video game) =

1989 video game

- Developer: Cope-Com
- Publisher: Discovery Software
- Platform: Amiga
- Release: 1989
- Genre: Scrolling shooter
- Mode: Single-player

Hybris is a vertically scrolling shooter for the Amiga home computer developed by Cope-Com and published by Discovery Software.

== Gameplay ==
Players choose a player character commander from either Lovett or Maverick and begin play, controlling a spaceship which can be moved up and down the screen, as well as left and right. Airborne alien enemies and groundbased defensive weapons appear as the game scrolls upwards constantly, these can be destroyed by the player's weapon fire. More advanced weapons can be collected in the form of power-ups. Hybris has a weapon enhancement feature, called "expansion"; once a new weapon has been collected it can be temporarily upgraded by the player rotating the joystick or pressing "Enter" on the keyboard, each weapon can be enhanced three times before a new weapon is needed in order to enhance again. Pressing "Space" on the keyboard activates a smart bomb that destroy every enemy (except bosses) and bullet on the screen: player starts with three of them.

== Legacy ==
Cope-Com later created the spiritual successor titled Battle Squadron.

In 2010, the creators intended to port the game to Android and iOS. Initially to be released in 2012, it was postponed several times, and as of 2026, the game has not come out.
