= List of Electronic Arts games: 2020–present =

This is a list of video games published or developed by Electronic Arts. Since 1983 and the 1987 release of its Skate or Die!, it has respectively published and developed games, bundles, as well as a handful of earlier productivity software. Only versions of games developed or published by EA, as well as those versions' years of release, are listed.

Legend
Developed and published by EA
Only developed by EA
Only published by EA
Only distributed by EA

List of released video games
Title	Release date	Platforms	Developer(s)	Ref(s)
Command & Conquer Remastered Collection	June 5, 2020	Windows	Petroglyph Games	
The Sims 4: Eco Lifestyle	June 5, 2020	Macintosh	Maxis Redwood Shores	
The Sims 4: Eco Lifestyle	June 5, 2020	PlayStation 4	Maxis Redwood Shores	
The Sims 4: Eco Lifestyle	June 5, 2020	Windows	Maxis Redwood Shores	
The Sims 4: Eco Lifestyle	June 5, 2020	Xbox One	Maxis Redwood Shores	
Rocket Arena	July 14, 2020 (Note: The game was later shut down on March 21, 2024.)	PlayStation 4	Final Strike Games	
Rocket Arena	July 14, 2020	Windows	Final Strike Games	
Rocket Arena	July 14, 2020	Xbox One	Final Strike Games	
Madden NFL 21 Mobile	August 6, 2020	Android	EA Tiburon	
Madden NFL 21 Mobile	August 6, 2020	iOS	EA Tiburon	
EA Sports UFC 4	August 14, 2020	PlayStation 4	EA Canada	
EA Sports UFC 4	August 14, 2020	Xbox One	EA Canada	
Madden NFL 21	August 28, 2020	PlayStation 4	EA Tiburon	
Madden NFL 21	August 28, 2020	Xbox One	EA Tiburon	
Madden NFL 21	August 28, 2020	Windows	EA Tiburon	
Madden NFL 21	November 10, 2020	Xbox Series X/S	EA Tiburon	
Madden NFL 21	November 12, 2020	PlayStation 5	EA Tiburon	
Madden NFL 21	January 28, 2021	Stadia	EA Tiburon	
The Sims 4: Star Wars: Journey to Batuu	September 8, 2020	Macintosh	Maxis Redwood Shores	
The Sims 4: Star Wars: Journey to Batuu	September 8, 2020	PlayStation 4	Maxis Redwood Shores	
The Sims 4: Star Wars: Journey to Batuu	September 8, 2020	Windows	Maxis Redwood Shores	
The Sims 4: Star Wars: Journey to Batuu	September 8, 2020	Xbox One	Maxis Redwood Shores	
Star Wars: Squadrons	October 2, 2020	PlayStation 4	Motive Studios	
Star Wars: Squadrons	October 2, 2020	Xbox One	Motive Studios	
Star Wars: Squadrons	October 2, 2020	Windows	Motive Studios	
FIFA 21	October 9, 2020	Nintendo Switch	EA Vancouver / EA Romania	
FIFA 21	October 9, 2020	PlayStation 4	EA Vancouver / EA Romania	
FIFA 21	October 9, 2020	Windows	EA Vancouver / EA Romania	
FIFA 21	October 9, 2020	Xbox One	EA Vancouver / EA Romania	
FIFA 21	November 10, 2020	Xbox Series X/S	EA Vancouver / EA Romania	
FIFA 21	November 12, 2020	PlayStation 5	EA Vancouver / EA Romania	
NHL 21	October 16, 2020	PlayStation 4	EA Vancouver	
NHL 21	October 16, 2020	Xbox One	EA Vancouver	
Need for Speed: Hot Pursuit Remastered	November 6, 2020	PlayStation 4	Criterion Games / Stellar Entertainment	
Need for Speed: Hot Pursuit Remastered	November 6, 2020	Windows	Criterion Games / Stellar Entertainment	
Need for Speed: Hot Pursuit Remastered	November 6, 2020	Xbox One	Criterion Games / Stellar Entertainment	
Need for Speed: Hot Pursuit Remastered	November 13, 2020	Nintendo Switch	Criterion Games / Stellar Entertainment	
The Sims 4: Snowy Escape	November 13, 2020	Macintosh	Maxis Redwood Shores	
The Sims 4: Snowy Escape	November 13, 2020	PlayStation 4	Maxis Redwood Shores	
The Sims 4: Snowy Escape	November 13, 2020	Windows	Maxis Redwood Shores	
The Sims 4: Snowy Escape	November 13, 2020	Xbox One	Maxis Redwood Shores	
Medal of Honor: Above and Beyond	December 11, 2020	Oculus Rift	Respawn Entertainment	
Medal of Honor: Above and Beyond	December 11, 2020	Steam VR	Respawn Entertainment	
It Takes Two	March 26, 2021	PlayStation 4	Hazelight Studios	
It Takes Two	March 26, 2021	PlayStation 5	Hazelight Studios	
It Takes Two	March 26, 2021	Windows	Hazelight Studios	
It Takes Two	March 26, 2021	Xbox One	Hazelight Studios	
It Takes Two	March 26, 2021	Xbox Series X/S	Hazelight Studios	
It Takes Two	November 4, 2022	Nintendo Switch	Hazelight Studios	
It Takes Two	October 15, 2026	Nintendo Switch 2	Hazelight Studios	
Mass Effect Legendary Edition	May 14, 2021	PlayStation 4	BioWare	
Mass Effect Legendary Edition	May 14, 2021	Windows	BioWare	
Mass Effect Legendary Edition	May 14, 2021	Xbox One	BioWare	
Knockout City	May 21, 2021	Nintendo Switch	Velan Studios (Note: Publishing duties moved to Velan Studios in 2022.)	
Knockout City	May 21, 2021	PlayStation 4	Velan Studios	
Knockout City	May 21, 2021	PlayStation 5	Velan Studios	
Knockout City	May 21, 2021	Windows	Velan Studios	
Knockout City	May 21, 2021	Xbox One	Velan Studios	
Knockout City	May 21, 2021	Xbox Series X/S	Velan Studios	
The Sims 4: Dream Home Decorator	June 1, 2021	Macintosh	Maxis Redwood Shores	
The Sims 4: Dream Home Decorator	June 1, 2021	PlayStation 4	Maxis Redwood Shores	
The Sims 4: Dream Home Decorator	June 1, 2021	Windows	Maxis Redwood Shores	
The Sims 4: Dream Home Decorator	June 1, 2021	Xbox One	Maxis Redwood Shores	
F1 2021	July 16, 2021	PlayStation 4	Codemasters	
F1 2021	July 16, 2021	PlayStation 5	Codemasters	
F1 2021	July 16, 2021	Xbox One	Codemasters	
F1 2021	July 16, 2021	Xbox Series X/S	Codemasters	
F1 2021	July 16, 2021	Windows	Codemasters	
The Sims 4: Cottage Living	July 22, 2021	Macintosh	Maxis Redwood Shores	
The Sims 4: Cottage Living	July 22, 2021	PlayStation 5	Maxis Redwood Shores	
The Sims 4: Cottage Living	July 22, 2021	Xbox One	Maxis Redwood Shores	
The Sims 4: Cottage Living	July 22, 2021	Xbox Series X/S	Maxis Redwood Shores	
The Sims 4: Cottage Living	July 22, 2021	Windows	Maxis Redwood Shores	
Madden NFL 22	August 20, 2021	PlayStation 4	EA Tiburon	
Madden NFL 22	August 20, 2021	PlayStation 5	EA Tiburon	
Madden NFL 22	August 20, 2021	Xbox One	EA Tiburon	
Madden NFL 22	August 20, 2021	Xbox Series X/S	EA Tiburon	
Madden NFL 22	August 20, 2021	Windows	EA Tiburon	
Madden NFL 22	August 20, 2021	Stadia	EA Tiburon	
Lost in Random	September 10, 2021	Nintendo Switch	Zoink	
Lost in Random	September 10, 2021	PlayStation 4	Zoink	
Lost in Random	September 10, 2021	PlayStation 5	Zoink	
Lost in Random	September 10, 2021	Xbox One	Zoink	
Lost in Random	September 10, 2021	Xbox Series X/S	Zoink	
Lost in Random	September 10, 2021	Windows	Zoink	
FIFA 22	October 1, 2021	Nintendo Switch	EA Vancouver	
FIFA 22	October 1, 2021	PlayStation 4	EA Vancouver	
FIFA 22	October 1, 2021	PlayStation 5	EA Vancouver	
FIFA 22	October 1, 2021	Xbox One	EA Vancouver	
FIFA 22	October 1, 2021	Xbox Series X/S	EA Vancouver	
FIFA 22	October 1, 2021	Windows	EA Vancouver	
FIFA 22	October 1, 2021	Stadia	EA Vancouver	
NHL 22	October 15, 2021	PlayStation 4	EA Vancouver	
NHL 22	October 15, 2021	PlayStation 5	EA Vancouver	
NHL 22	October 15, 2021	Xbox One	EA Vancouver	
NHL 22	October 15, 2021	Xbox Series X/S	EA Vancouver	
Battlefield 2042	November 19, 2021	PlayStation 4	EA DICE	
Battlefield 2042	November 19, 2021	PlayStation 5	EA DICE	
Battlefield 2042	November 19, 2021	Xbox One	EA DICE	
Battlefield 2042	November 19, 2021	Xbox Series X/S	EA DICE	
Battlefield 2042	November 19, 2021	Windows	EA DICE	
The Sims 4: My Wedding Stories	February 23, 2022	Macintosh	Maxis Redwood Shores	
The Sims 4: My Wedding Stories	February 23, 2022	PlayStation 4	Maxis Redwood Shores	
The Sims 4: My Wedding Stories	February 23, 2022	Windows	Maxis Redwood Shores	
The Sims 4: My Wedding Stories	February 23, 2022	Xbox One	Maxis Redwood Shores	
GRID Legends	February 25, 2022	PlayStation 4	Codemasters	
GRID Legends	February 25, 2022	PlayStation 5	Codemasters	
GRID Legends	February 25, 2022	Xbox One	Codemasters	
GRID Legends	February 25, 2022	Xbox Series X/S	Codemasters	
GRID Legends	February 25, 2022	Windows	Codemasters	
GRID Legends	January 12, 2023	Meta Quest 2	Codemasters	
Apex Legends Mobile	May 17, 2022 (Note: The game was shut down on May 1, 2023.)	iOS	Respawn Entertainment / LightSpeed Studios	
Apex Legends Mobile	May 17, 2022	Android	Respawn Entertainment / LightSpeed Studios	
The Sims 4: Werewolves	June 16, 2022	Macintosh	Maxis Redwood Shores	
The Sims 4: Werewolves	June 16, 2022	PlayStation 4	Maxis Redwood Shores	
The Sims 4: Werewolves	June 16, 2022	Windows	Maxis Redwood Shores	
The Sims 4: Werewolves	June 16, 2022	Xbox One	Maxis Redwood Shores	
F1 22	July 1, 2022	PlayStation 4	Codemasters	
F1 22	July 1, 2022	PlayStation 5	Codemasters	
F1 22	July 1, 2022	Xbox One	Codemasters	
F1 22	July 1, 2022	Xbox Series X/S	Codemasters	
F1 22	July 1, 2022	Windows	Codemasters	
The Sims 4: High School Years	July 28, 2022	Macintosh	Maxis Redwood Shores	
The Sims 4: High School Years	July 28, 2022	PlayStation 5	Maxis Redwood Shores	
The Sims 4: High School Years	July 28, 2022	Xbox One	Maxis Redwood Shores	
The Sims 4: High School Years	July 28, 2022	Xbox Series X/S	Maxis Redwood Shores	
The Sims 4: High School Years	July 28, 2022	Windows	Maxis Redwood Shores	
Madden NFL 23	August 19, 2022	Macintosh	EA Tiburon	
Madden NFL 23	August 19, 2022	PlayStation 4	EA Tiburon	
Madden NFL 23	August 19, 2022	PlayStation 5	EA Tiburon	
Madden NFL 23	August 19, 2022	Xbox One	EA Tiburon	
Madden NFL 23	August 19, 2022	Xbox Series X/S	EA Tiburon	
Madden NFL 23	August 19, 2022	Windows	EA Tiburon	
FIFA 23	September 30, 2022	Nintendo Switch	EA Vancouver / EA Romania	
FIFA 23	September 30, 2022	PlayStation 4	EA Vancouver / EA Romania	
FIFA 23	September 30, 2022	PlayStation 5	EA Vancouver / EA Romania	
FIFA 23	September 30, 2022	Xbox One	EA Vancouver / EA Romania	
FIFA 23	September 30, 2022	Xbox Series X/S	EA Vancouver / EA Romania	
FIFA 23	September 30, 2022	Windows	EA Vancouver / EA Romania	
NHL 23	October 14, 2022	PlayStation 4	EA Vancouver	
NHL 23	October 14, 2022	PlayStation 5	EA Vancouver	
NHL 23	October 14, 2022	Xbox One	EA Vancouver	
NHL 23	October 14, 2022	Xbox Series X/S	EA Vancouver	
Need for Speed Unbound	December 2, 2022	PlayStation 5	Criterion Games	
Need for Speed Unbound	December 2, 2022	Xbox Series X/S	Criterion Games	
Need for Speed Unbound	December 2, 2022	Windows	Criterion Games	
Dead Space	January 27, 2023	PlayStation 5	Motive Studios	
Dead Space	January 27, 2023	Xbox Series X/S	Motive Studios	
Dead Space	January 27, 2023	Windows	Motive Studios	
Wild Hearts	February 17, 2023	PlayStation 5	Omega Force	
Wild Hearts	February 17, 2023	Xbox Series X/S	Omega Force	
Wild Hearts	February 17, 2023	Windows	Omega Force	
The Sims 4: Growing Together	March 16, 2023	Macintosh	Maxis Redwood Shores	
The Sims 4: Growing Together	March 16, 2023	PlayStation 4	Maxis Redwood Shores	
The Sims 4: Growing Together	March 16, 2023	Xbox One	Maxis Redwood Shores	
The Sims 4: Growing Together	March 16, 2023	Xbox Series X/S	Maxis Redwood Shores	
The Sims 4: Growing Together	March 16, 2023	Windows	Maxis Redwood Shores	
EA Sports PGA Tour	April 7, 2023	PlayStation 5	EA Tiburon	
EA Sports PGA Tour	April 7, 2023	Xbox Series X/S	EA Tiburon	
EA Sports PGA Tour	April 7, 2023	Windows	EA Tiburon	
Star Wars Jedi: Survivor	April 28, 2023	PlayStation 5	Respawn Entertainment	
Star Wars Jedi: Survivor	April 28, 2023	Xbox Series X/S	Respawn Entertainment	
Star Wars Jedi: Survivor	April 28, 2023	Windows	Respawn Entertainment	
Star Wars Jedi: Survivor	September 17, 2024	PlayStation 4	Respawn Entertainment	
Star Wars Jedi: Survivor	September 17, 2024	Xbox One	Respawn Entertainment	
The Lord of the Rings: Heroes of Middle-earth	May 10, 2023 (Note: The game was shut down on May 24, 2024.)	iOS	Capital Games	
The Lord of the Rings: Heroes of Middle-earth	May 10, 2023	Android	Capital Games	
Super Mega Baseball 4	June 2, 2023	Nintendo Switch	Metalhead Software	
Super Mega Baseball 4	June 2, 2023	PlayStation 4	Metalhead Software	
Super Mega Baseball 4	June 2, 2023	PlayStation 5	Metalhead Software	
Super Mega Baseball 4	June 2, 2023	Xbox One	Metalhead Software	
Super Mega Baseball 4	June 2, 2023	Xbox Series X/S	Metalhead Software	
Super Mega Baseball 4	June 2, 2023	Windows	Metalhead Software	
F1 23	June 16, 2023	PlayStation 4	Codemasters	
F1 23	June 16, 2023	PlayStation 5	Codemasters	
F1 23	June 16, 2023	Xbox One	Codemasters	
F1 23	June 16, 2023	Xbox Series X/S	Codemasters	
F1 23	June 16, 2023	Windows	Codemasters	
The Sims 4: Horse Ranch	July 20, 2023	Macintosh	Maxis Redwood Shores	
The Sims 4: Horse Ranch	July 20, 2023	PlayStation 4	Maxis Redwood Shores	
The Sims 4: Horse Ranch	July 20, 2023	Windows	Maxis Redwood Shores	
The Sims 4: Horse Ranch	July 20, 2023	Xbox One	Maxis Redwood Shores	
Madden NFL 24	August 18, 2023	Macintosh	EA Tiburon	
Madden NFL 24	August 18, 2023	PlayStation 4	EA Tiburon	
Madden NFL 24	August 18, 2023	PlayStation 5	EA Tiburon	
Madden NFL 24	August 18, 2023	Xbox One	EA Tiburon	
Madden NFL 24	August 18, 2023	Xbox Series X/S	EA Tiburon	
Madden NFL 24	August 18, 2023	Windows	EA Tiburon	
Immortals of Aveum	August 22, 2023	PlayStation 5	Ascendant Studios	
Immortals of Aveum	August 22, 2023	Xbox Series X/S	Ascendant Studios	
Immortals of Aveum	August 22, 2023	Windows	Ascendant Studios	
EA Sports FC 24	September 29, 2023	Nintendo Switch	EA Vancouver / EA Romania	
EA Sports FC 24	September 29, 2023	PlayStation 4	EA Vancouver / EA Romania	
EA Sports FC 24	September 29, 2023	PlayStation 5	EA Vancouver / EA Romania	
EA Sports FC 24	September 29, 2023	Xbox One	EA Vancouver / EA Romania	
EA Sports FC 24	September 29, 2023	Xbox Series X/S	EA Vancouver / EA Romania	
EA Sports FC 24	September 29, 2023	Windows	EA Vancouver / EA Romania	
NHL 24	October 6, 2023	PlayStation 4	EA Vancouver	
NHL 24	October 6, 2023	PlayStation 5	EA Vancouver	
NHL 24	October 6, 2023	Xbox One	EA Vancouver	
NHL 24	October 6, 2023	Xbox Series X/S	EA Vancouver	
EA Sports UFC 5	October 27, 2023	PlayStation 5	EA Vancouver	
EA Sports UFC 5	October 27, 2023	Xbox Series X/S	EA Vancouver	
EA Sports WRC	November 3, 2023	PlayStation 5	Codemasters	
EA Sports WRC	November 3, 2023	Xbox Series X/S	Codemasters	
EA Sports WRC	November 3, 2023	Windows	Codemasters	
The Sims 4: For Rent	December 7, 2023	Macintosh	Maxis Redwood Shores	
The Sims 4: For Rent	December 7, 2023	PlayStation 4	Maxis Redwood Shores	
The Sims 4: For Rent	December 7, 2023	PlayStation 5	Maxis Redwood Shores	
The Sims 4: For Rent	December 7, 2023	Xbox One	Maxis Redwood Shores	
The Sims 4: For Rent	December 7, 2023	Xbox Series X/S	Maxis Redwood Shores	
The Sims 4: For Rent	December 7, 2023	Windows	Maxis Redwood Shores	
Tales of Kenzera: Zau	April 23, 2024	Nintendo Switch	Surgent Studios	
Tales of Kenzera: Zau	April 23, 2024	PlayStation 5	Surgent Studios	
Tales of Kenzera: Zau	April 23, 2024	Xbox Series X/S	Surgent Studios	
Tales of Kenzera: Zau	April 23, 2024	Windows	Surgent Studios	
F1 24	May 31, 2024	PlayStation 4	Codemasters	
F1 24	May 31, 2024	PlayStation 5	Codemasters	
F1 24	May 31, 2024	Xbox One	Codemasters	
F1 24	May 31, 2024	Xbox Series X/S	Codemasters	
F1 24	May 31, 2024	Windows	Codemasters	
Need for Speed: Assemble	July 11, 2024	iOS	TiMi Studios	
Need for Speed: Assemble	July 11, 2024	Android	TiMi Studios	
EA Sports College Football 25	July 19, 2024	PlayStation 5	EA Orlando	
EA Sports College Football 25	July 19, 2024	Xbox Series X/S	EA Orlando	
The Sims 4: Lovestruck	July 25, 2024	Macintosh	Maxis Redwood Shores	
The Sims 4: Lovestruck	July 25, 2024	PlayStation 4	Maxis Redwood Shores	
The Sims 4: Lovestruck	July 25, 2024	PlayStation 5	Maxis Redwood Shores	
The Sims 4: Lovestruck	July 25, 2024	Xbox One	Maxis Redwood Shores	
The Sims 4: Lovestruck	July 25, 2024	Xbox Series X/S	Maxis Redwood Shores	
The Sims 4: Lovestruck	July 25, 2024	Windows	Maxis Redwood Shores	
Madden NFL 25	August 16, 2024	Macintosh	EA Orlando	
Madden NFL 25	August 16, 2024	PlayStation 4	EA Orlando	
Madden NFL 25	August 16, 2024	PlayStation 5	EA Orlando	
Madden NFL 25	August 16, 2024	Xbox One	EA Orlando	
Madden NFL 25	August 16, 2024	Xbox Series X/S	EA Orlando	
Madden NFL 25	August 16, 2024	Windows	EA Orlando	
EA Sports FC 25	September 27, 2024	Nintendo Switch	EA Vancouver / EA Romania	
EA Sports FC 25	September 27, 2024	PlayStation 4	EA Vancouver / EA Romania	
EA Sports FC 25	September 27, 2024	PlayStation 5	EA Vancouver / EA Romania	
EA Sports FC 25	September 27, 2024	Xbox One	EA Vancouver / EA Romania	
EA Sports FC 25	September 27, 2024	Xbox Series X/S	EA Vancouver / EA Romania	
EA Sports FC 25	September 27, 2024	Windows	EA Vancouver / EA Romania	
NHL 25	October 4, 2024	PlayStation 5	EA Vancouver	
NHL 25	October 4, 2024	Xbox Series X/S	EA Vancouver	
Dragon Age: The Veilguard	October 31, 2024	PlayStation 5	BioWare	
Dragon Age: The Veilguard	October 31, 2024	Xbox Series X/S	BioWare	
Dragon Age: The Veilguard	October 31, 2024	Windows	BioWare	
The Sims 4: Life & Death	October 31, 2024	Macintosh	Maxis Redwood Shores	
The Sims 4: Life & Death	October 31, 2024	PlayStation 4	Maxis Redwood Shores	
The Sims 4: Life & Death	October 31, 2024	PlayStation 5	Maxis Redwood Shores	
The Sims 4: Life & Death	October 31, 2024	Xbox One	Maxis Redwood Shores	
The Sims 4: Life & Death	October 31, 2024	Xbox Series X/S	Maxis Redwood Shores	
The Sims 4: Life & Death	October 31, 2024	Windows	Maxis Redwood Shores	
MySims: Cozy Bundle	November 19, 2024	Nintendo Switch	EA Redwood Shores	
MySims: Cozy Bundle	March 18, 2025	Windows	EA Redwood Shores	
MySims: Cozy Bundle	November 18, 2025	PlayStation 5	EA Redwood Shores	
MySims: Cozy Bundle	November 18, 2025	Xbox Series X/S	EA Redwood Shores	
The Sims 4: Businesses & Hobbies	March 6, 2025	Macintosh	Maxis Redwood Shores	
The Sims 4: Businesses & Hobbies	March 6, 2025	PlayStation 4	Maxis Redwood Shores	
The Sims 4: Businesses & Hobbies	March 6, 2025	PlayStation 5	Maxis Redwood Shores	
The Sims 4: Businesses & Hobbies	March 6, 2025	Xbox One	Maxis Redwood Shores	
The Sims 4: Businesses & Hobbies	March 6, 2025	Xbox Series X/S	Maxis Redwood Shores	
The Sims 4: Businesses & Hobbies	March 6, 2025	Windows	Maxis Redwood Shores	
Split Fiction	March 6, 2025	PlayStation 5	Hazelight Studios	
Split Fiction	March 6, 2025	Xbox Series X/S	Hazelight Studios	
Split Fiction	March 6, 2025	Windows	Hazelight Studios	
Split Fiction	June 5, 2025	Nintendo Switch 2	Hazelight Studios	
Command & Conquer: Legions	May 27, 2025	iOS	Level Infinite	
Command & Conquer: Legions	May 27, 2025	Android	Level Infinite	
F1 25	May 30, 2025	PlayStation 5	Codemasters	
F1 25	May 30, 2025	Xbox Series X/S	Codemasters	
F1 25	May 30, 2025	Windows	Codemasters	
EA Sports College Football 26	July 10, 2025	PlayStation 5	EA Orlando	
EA Sports College Football 26	July 10, 2025	Xbox Series X/S	EA Orlando	
The Sims 4: Enchanted by Nature	July 10, 2025	Macintosh	Maxis Redwood Shores	
The Sims 4: Enchanted by Nature	July 10, 2025	PlayStation 4	Maxis Redwood Shores	
The Sims 4: Enchanted by Nature	July 10, 2025	PlayStation 5	Maxis Redwood Shores	
The Sims 4: Enchanted by Nature	July 10, 2025	Xbox One	Maxis Redwood Shores	
The Sims 4: Enchanted by Nature	July 10, 2025	Xbox Series X/S	Maxis Redwood Shores	
The Sims 4: Enchanted by Nature	July 10, 2025	Windows	Maxis Redwood Shores	
Madden NFL 26	August 14, 2025	Nintendo Switch 2	EA Orlando	
Madden NFL 26	August 14, 2025	PlayStation 5	EA Orlando	
Madden NFL 26	August 14, 2025	Xbox Series X/S	EA Orlando	
Madden NFL 26	August 14, 2025	Windows	EA Orlando	
NHL 26	September 12, 2025	PlayStation 5	EA Vancouver	
NHL 26	September 12, 2025	Xbox Series X/S	EA Vancouver	
EA Sports FC 26	September 26, 2025	Nintendo Switch	EA Vancouver / EA Romania	
EA Sports FC 26	September 26, 2025	Nintendo Switch 2	EA Vancouver / EA Romania	
EA Sports FC 26	September 26, 2025	PlayStation 4	EA Vancouver / EA Romania	
EA Sports FC 26	September 26, 2025	PlayStation 5	EA Vancouver / EA Romania	
EA Sports FC 26	September 26, 2025	Xbox One	EA Vancouver / EA Romania	
EA Sports FC 26	September 26, 2025	Xbox Series X/S	EA Vancouver / EA Romania	
EA Sports FC 26	September 26, 2025	Windows	EA Vancouver / EA Romania	
The Sims 4: Adventure Awaits	October 2, 2025	Macintosh	Maxis Redwood Shores	
The Sims 4: Adventure Awaits	October 2, 2025	PlayStation 4	Maxis Redwood Shores	
The Sims 4: Adventure Awaits	October 2, 2025	PlayStation 5	Maxis Redwood Shores	
The Sims 4: Adventure Awaits	October 2, 2025	Xbox One	Maxis Redwood Shores	
The Sims 4: Adventure Awaits	October 2, 2025	Xbox Series X/S	Maxis Redwood Shores	
The Sims 4: Adventure Awaits	October 2, 2025	Windows	Maxis Redwood Shores	
Battlefield 6	October 10, 2025	PlayStation 5	Battlefield Studios	
Battlefield 6	October 10, 2025	Xbox Series X/S	Battlefield Studios	
Battlefield 6	October 10, 2025	Windows	Battlefield Studios	
Plants vs. Zombies: Replanted	October 23, 2025	Nintendo Switch	PopCap Games / The Lost Pixels	
Plants vs. Zombies: Replanted	October 23, 2025	Nintendo Switch 2	PopCap Games / The Lost Pixels	
Plants vs. Zombies: Replanted	October 23, 2025	PlayStation 4	PopCap Games / The Lost Pixels	
Plants vs. Zombies: Replanted	October 23, 2025	PlayStation 5	PopCap Games / The Lost Pixels	
Plants vs. Zombies: Replanted	October 23, 2025	Xbox One	PopCap Games / The Lost Pixels	
Plants vs. Zombies: Replanted	October 23, 2025	Xbox Series X/S	PopCap Games / The Lost Pixels	
Plants vs. Zombies: Replanted	October 23, 2025	Windows	PopCap Games / The Lost Pixels	
Battlefield RedSec	October 28, 2025	PlayStation 5	Battlefield Studios	
Battlefield RedSec	October 28, 2025	Xbox Series X/S	Battlefield Studios	
Battlefield RedSec	October 28, 2025	Windows	Battlefield Studios	
The Sims 4: Royalty & Legacy	February 12, 2026	Macintosh	Maxis Redwood Shores	
The Sims 4: Royalty & Legacy	February 12, 2026	PlayStation 4	Maxis Redwood Shores	
The Sims 4: Royalty & Legacy	February 12, 2026	PlayStation 5	Maxis Redwood Shores	
The Sims 4: Royalty & Legacy	February 12, 2026	Xbox One	Maxis Redwood Shores	
The Sims 4: Royalty & Legacy	February 12, 2026	Xbox Series X/S	Maxis Redwood Shores	
The Sims 4: Royalty & Legacy	February 12, 2026	Windows	Maxis Redwood Shores	
EA Sports UFC 6	June 19, 2026	PlayStation 5	EA Canada	
EA Sports UFC 6	June 19, 2026	Xbox Series X/S	EA Canada	
EA Sports College Football 27	July 9, 2026	PlayStation 5	EA Orlando	
EA Sports College Football 27	July 9, 2026	Xbox Series X/S	EA Orlando	
EA Sports College Football 27	July 9, 2026	Windows	EA Orlando	
Madden NFL 27	August 13, 2026	Nintendo Switch 2	EA Orlando	
Madden NFL 27	August 13, 2026	PlayStation 5	EA Orlando	
Madden NFL 27	August 13, 2026	Xbox Series X/S	EA Orlando	
Madden NFL 27	August 13, 2026	Windows	EA Orlando	
Star Wars Zero Company	August 27, 2026	PlayStation 5	Respawn Entertainment / Bit Reactor	
Star Wars Zero Company	August 27, 2026	Xbox Series X/S	Respawn Entertainment / Bit Reactor	
Star Wars Zero Company	August 27, 2026	Windows	Respawn Entertainment / Bit Reactor	
NHL 27	September 11, 2026	PlayStation 5	EA Vancouver	
NHL 27	September 11, 2026	Xbox Series X/S	EA Vancouver	
EA Sports FC 27	September 25, 2026	Nintendo Switch	EA Vancouver / EA Romania	
EA Sports FC 27	September 25, 2026	Nintendo Switch 2	EA Vancouver / EA Romania	
EA Sports FC 27	September 25, 2026	PlayStation 4	EA Vancouver / EA Romania	
EA Sports FC 27	September 25, 2026	PlayStation 5	EA Vancouver / EA Romania	
EA Sports FC 27	September 25, 2026	Xbox One	EA Vancouver / EA Romania	
EA Sports FC 27	September 25, 2026	Xbox Series X/S	EA Vancouver / EA Romania	
EA Sports FC 27	September 25, 2026	Windows	EA Vancouver / EA Romania	
Plants vs. Zombies 3: Evolved	TBA	iOS	PopCap Games	
Plants vs. Zombies 3: Evolved	TBA	Android	PopCap Games	
Skate	TBA (Note: The game launched in early access on September 16, 2025.)	PlayStation 4	Full Circle	
Skate	TBA	PlayStation 5	Full Circle	
Skate	TBA	Xbox One	Full Circle	
Skate	TBA	Xbox Series X/S	Full Circle	
Skate	TBA	Windows	Full Circle	
Skate	TBA	Android	Full Circle	
Skate	TBA	iOS	Full Circle	
Untitled Star Wars Jedi: Survivor sequel	TBA	TBA	Respawn Entertainment	
Untitled Iron Man game	TBA	TBA	Motive Studios	
Project Evergreen - The Sims game	TBA	TBA	Maxis	
Untitled Marvel game	TBA	TBA	TBA	

List of cancelled video games
Name	Platforms	Developer(s)	Ref
Battlefield Mobile	iOS	Industrial Toys	
Battlefield Mobile	Android	Industrial Toys	
RustHeart	—N/a	Glowmade	
Untitled game by Steve Fukuda	—N/a	Respawn Entertainment	
Untitled Star Wars first-person shooter	—N/a	Respawn Entertainment	
Untitled Titanfall extraction shooter	—N/a	Respawn Entertainment	
Untitled Black Panther game	—N/a	Cliffhanger Games	
Mass Effect Universe	—N/a	BioWare	

== See also ==
- List of Electronic Arts games
- List of Electronic Arts games: 1983–1999
- List of Electronic Arts games: 2000–2009
- List of Electronic Arts games: 2010–2019
