= Rushdown (video game) =

1999 video game

- Developers: Canal+ Multimédia; Virtual Studio
- Publishers: EU: Canal+ Multimédia; NA: Electronic Arts
- Platform: PlayStation
- Release: EU: 1999; NA: March 3, 1999
- Genre: Sports
- Modes: Single-player, multiplayer

Rushdown is a sports video game developed by Canal+ Multimédia and Virtual Studio for PlayStation in 1999. Canal+ Multimédia published the game themselves in Europe with Infogrames handling distribution and marketing, while Electronic Arts published the game in North America.

== Reception ==
Reception

Aggregate score
Aggregator	Score
GameRankings	42%

Review scores
Publication	Score
AllGame	2.5/5
CNET Gamecenter	4/10
EP Daily	1/10
Game Informer	5/10
GameSpot	2/10
IGN	1.5/10
Official U.S. PlayStation Magazine	2/5
PlayStation: The Official Magazine	1.5/5

The game received unfavorable reviews according to the review aggregation website GameRankings.
