= Battle Squadron =

1989 video game

- Developer: Cope-Com
- Publishers: Innerprise Software; Electronic Arts (Genesis); Seal Of Action Publishing (2013)
- Platforms: Amiga, Mega Drive, iOS, Android, AmigaOS 4, Windows, OS X, MorphOS
- Release: 1989: Amiga; 1990: Mega Drive; 2011: iOS; 2012: Android; 2013: AmigaOS 4, Windows, OS X
- Genre: Scrolling shooter
- Modes: Single-player, multiplayer

Battle Squadron is a vertically scrolling shooter developed by Cope-Com and published in 1989 by Innerprise Software for the Amiga. It is a sequel to Hybris. Electronic Arts released a version for the Mega Drive in 1990. Conversions were later published for iOS (2011), Android (2012), and in 2013, AmigaOS 4, Windows, OS X, and MorphOS.

== Plot ==
Taking place many years in the future in another star system, a century-long war is waging between the Earth Defense Fleet and the Barrax Empire. Two Earth Defense Commanders, Lori Bergin and Barry Mayers, were returning from a research and destroy mission regarding the latest Barrax technologies on planet Urania, when suddenly a Barrax cruiser materialized behind them, brought their ship in and took the commanders hostage on planet Terrainia. The player's mission is to rescue the Commanders and eliminate all Barrax threats in the process.

== Gameplay ==
Four screenshots

Battle Squadron supports both mouse and joystick controlled play. The game is played from the perspective of elite fighter pilots of the Earth Defense Fleet, called the Battle Squadron sent to rescue two human agents, Commanders Berry D. Mayers and Lori Bergin, from the clutches of the ruthless alien empire, known as the Barrax. The player's fighters carry unlimited projectile weaponry and a finite number of Nova Smart Bombs. The player acquires weapons by shooting down Barraxian Artillery Gunships which carry Power-Up icons. Weapons include the Red Magnetic Torps, the powerful Green Emerald Laser, the two-way firing Blue Anti-Matter Particle Beam and the sideways firing Orange Magma Wave. Other pick-up items include Barraxian jewel caches marked by small green X's which are worth 1,000 points each. The player has the option to increase the number and speed of enemy bullets, altering the game's difficulty.

Notable features are relatively large sprites (with cloaking effects applied to a few) and many weapon upgrades (25 in total). Barraxian opponents consist of ground installations (generally gun turrets and launch platforms), vehicles, aircraft and numerous genetically-engineered living weapons.

Enemies include:

- Cargo vehicles that drop weapon upgrades upon destruction.
- Four-craft squadrons of Barrax fighters that will release an extra, collectable Nova Bomb upon destruction of the entire squadron.
- Two different varieties of gigantic robotic terror machines, functioning as the bosses of two separate levels.
- Several giant faces within the terrain, serving as end-of-level bosses.
- The Barrax Nova Cruiser, the end-game boss.

== Reception ==
Reception

Review score
Publication	Score
Electronic Gaming Monthly	5/10, 5/10, 5/10, 5/10 (Genesis)

In 1989, The Games Machine rated Battle Squadron as 87%. It stated that while the premise sounds similar to other games, "what makes this game work is its ultra-fast playing speed. And with multiple frames of animation for each onscreen sequence, it gives a believable feeling of really blowing up baddies and wiping out ground installations". It also noted that this game is ahead of other shooting games because of "the rapid-fire animation, coupled with effective sound and a long running music track containing the right amount of droning bass".

The German edition of Retro Gamer, in a 2016 special on Amiga, highlighted that the 1989 version of "Battle Squadron was simply brilliantly made; sparkling clean graphics and exquisite playability ensured sophisticated action fun".
