= Golden Oldies: Volume 1 - Computer Software Classics =

1985 video game compilation

- Publisher(s): Software Country
- Platform(s): Amiga, Apple II, Atari 8-bit, Atari ST, Commodore 64, MS-DOS
- Release: 1985: Apple, Atari 8-bit, C64, MS-DOS; 1986: Amiga, ST
- Genre(s): Various

Golden Oldies: Volume 1 - Computer Software Classics is a retrospective compilation of four video games from prior to the microcomputer era: Adventure, Eliza, Life, and Pong. It was published in 1985 for the Apple II, Atari 8-bit computers, Commodore 64, and MS-DOS. Atari ST and Amiga versions followed in 1986. Despite the "Volume 1" in the title, no further collections were released.

== Reception ==
James Langdell of PC Magazine approved of Golden Oldies providing the original versions of the included games, paying royalties to their authors, and including historical articles for context. He concluded that "the best tribute to the creators ... is to discover that their games are still worth playing". Roy Wagner of Computer Gaming World stated that "These games are pure and simple, yet still fun to play and enjoy". Steve Panak in ANALOG Computing called the manual "superb" and concluded, "If you're interested in researching and reliving this portion of our recent history, Golden Oldies is a rich vein to tap".
