= Scarab (video game) =

1997 video game

- Developer: Electronic Arts
- Publisher: Electronic Arts
- Platform: Windows
- Release: NA: March 20, 1997; EU: 1997
- Genre: First-person shooter
- Modes: Single-player, multiplayer

Scarab (stylized as S.C.A.R.A.B.) is a video game developed and published by Electronic Arts for Windows.

== Gameplay ==
Scarab is a game that takes place in ancient Egypt, except that the gods use mechanized soldiers in their wars against one other. The game combines elements of shooters and strategy games, where each side can win by either defeating all opponents, or by placing and keeping the largest amount of towers around the map within a specific amount of time.

== Reception ==
Reception

Review scores
Publication	Score
Computer Games Magazine	4.5/5
GameSpot	7.3/10
Next Generation	3/5
PC Gamer	58%

Next Generation reviewed the PC version of the game, rating it three stars out of five, and stated that "Although the missions vary a bit, they mostly stay within the same vein – kill or be killed. If you're playing alone, there are other, better titles with similar gameplay, but playing with a few friends over a LAN or on the Net, Scarab ain't bad at all."
