= Radio Baseball =

1986 video game

- Developer: Diamond Edge Software
- Publisher: Electronic Arts
- Platform: MS-DOS
- Release: 1986
- Genre: Sports

Radio Baseball is a text-based baseball coaching simulator developed by Diamond Edge Software and published in 1986 by Electronic Arts for MS-DOS.

== Gameplay ==
Radio Baseball is a game in which players view the linescore, showing the current pitcher and batter, the full lineup of each team, and the play-by-play commentary.

== Reception ==
Rick Teverbaugh reviewed the game for Computer Gaming World, and stated that "Overall, I enjoyed Radio Baseball and think it's a worthy entry into the baseball field. With a couple of changes, it could be all-star material."
