= F-16 Combat Pilot =

1989 video game

- European cover art
- Developer: Digital Integration
- Publishers: EU: Digital Integration; NA: Electronic Arts
- Designer: David K. Marshall
- Platforms: Amiga, Atari ST, MS-DOS, Commodore 64, Amstrad CPC, ZX Spectrum
- Release: 1989: Amiga, ST, MS-DOS; 1990: C64; 1991: CPC, Spectrum
- Genre: Combat flight simulation
- Modes: Single-player, multiplayer

F-16 Combat Pilot is a F-16 combat flight simulation game created by British software company Digital Integration, It was published in 1989 for Amiga, Atari ST, and MS-DOS, then Commodore 64 in 1990, and Amstrad CPC and ZX Spectrum in 1991. While the graphics, scenery and audio are sparse, the instruments and flight dynamics of a F-16C Fighting Falcon are fully featured and modeled.

== Gameplay ==
=== Opposition and player ===
The airborne opposition is made up from MiGs: Mikoyan MIG-31 Foxhound, Mikoyan MIG-27 Flogger and Mikoyan MIG-29 Fulcrum. Most of the missions start with the player inside a hangar, from which the player enters an IFF code, initiate engine start up, taxi without over-speeding, getting on the runway and takeoff - which adds to the tension if the base is under attack. On the ground, there are tank battalions (which moved to different locations as war progressed), radar & missiles installations and Triple-A guns around enemy airfields. It is possible to shoot down friendly aircraft by gunfire, but friendly aircraft can not be designated or tracked by player's radar.

The simulation keeps a flying log of all the player's time on F-16 and "callsign", which also appears in the game when the player contacts the control tower at airfields (for its time, this was a very advanced feature). If the pilot "dies" in combat, this log is erased, and a new "pilot" is created. Any training missions that were previously completed successfully (using the old "pilot") will have to be repeated because the player is now playing as new pilot.

=== Weapons ===
The weapons that can be used in the game include: AIM-120A AMRAAM, AIM-9M Sidewinder, Mk82 (slicks and snakes), Mk83 slicks, Mk84 slicks, AGM-88A HARM, BLU-107 Durandal, AGM-65 Maverick (IR guided "D" and laser guided"E"), M61A1 20mm cannon, LANTIRN Targeting pod, ATARS pod, and the external fuel tanks. The LANTIRN pod is possibly the first to appear in a combat flight simulation. All weapons behave as accurately as possible, missiles can miss if used incorrectly, fired at extreme angles in relation to the enemy fighter or the enemies used countermeasures; the missiles don't make impossible maneuvers to its target as prevalent in other combat simulations of its time.

=== Flight dynamics ===
Dave Marshall of Digital Integration used to programme real military flight simulators and had built up a huge library of the technical specifications for the F-16C and knew whom to ask for some of the less readily available information, and this clearly shows in the complexity and realism of F-16 Combat Pilot.

The flight dynamics is one of the most accurate for its time. The landing is accurately difficult, the player has to master the AoA (Angle of Attack) and vertical velocity during approach, unlike other combat simulations of its time. For example, F-15 Strike Eagle II had extremely unrealistic landings where all the player had to do is simply just aim the plane at the runway at any angle or speed. Being not properly lined up would cause autoland (used in conjunction with ILS) to disengage if activated, and hard landings beyond certain parameters would damage the landing gear, or even cause a crash. Not following proper speed guidelines while taxiing or going too fast on the runway without lifting off would also damage the aircraft. Unlike other simulations of its time, landing on the nose-wheel would result in a crash due to gear collapse as in real life. A crash is represented with a full screen showing mini explosions, after which the debriefing screen would show up indicating whether or not the player survived. Hard crashes are usually unsurvivable, but the player may walk away from nose-wheel collapses and other minor crashes. The simulation allows the player to perform a wheels-up (belly) landing if the landing gear is damaged and not extendable, but landing has to be precise and smooth with a very low vertical velocity.

The airframe also has g-force limitations depending on whether the aircraft was fully loaded as the real F-16 has stores configuration categories. When fully loaded, the player can only pull 5.5G's, instead of the 9G's a clean F-16 is capable of. Airspeed & Mach speed would be lower when fully laden as well. The player can even jettison the fuel and weapons to enable the aircraft to pull higher G's, such as in the event of an emergency or in combat or an aborted mission. Spins and ground effect are not simulated, as is with other simulations of its time, although another rare feature, turbulence is a user selectable option at Briefing & Weather screen. Turbulence in the simulation causes random and slight variations in the aircraft's bank angle and heading, making it a little bit more difficult to land, but it never affects the altitude.

The damage system is extensively modeled on F-16 Combat Pilot. Each system on board the player's aircraft can be damaged in combat, from radar, landing gear, flaps to ASPJ, oxygen/cabin pressure systems, weapons, communications, navigation system or HUD, etc. If the player successfully returns to base with a damaged aircraft, the aircraft can be repaired and reused before the debrief screen, provided that given airfield has the necessary components and spare parts. This is indicated by colour-coded status in radio communications. The aircraft can survive near missile hits or enemy AAA fire at times, but not a direct hit. When there is an onboard fire, the aircraft will be damaged and explode subsequently (if the player does not eject immediately). It is not uncommon for players to have many "dead stick" landings with engine failure when returning damaged from combat, out of chaff and flare, and even out of fuel, being chased and fired upon by enemies.

=== Weather and environment ===
Players fly in a large battlefield. A typical flight from one end of the battlefield to the other usually takes about forty minutes, depending on the player's flight speed. Faster flight also consumes more fuel due to the use of afterburners, especially at low altitude, so some fuel conservation, careful planning and flying is required to come out alive. This battlefield is dotted with two sides of factories, towns, airports, power stations, radar installations and tank battalions. This map can be viewed in the Mission Room. Once near the enemy border, any flights above 500 feet will cause enemy radars to track the player and MiGs to scramble and vector into the players' position, so this requires flying at low altitude to infiltrate enemy territory for strike missions.

Mountains are represented by same-sized pyramids. There are also rivers, bridges (which the player can fly under), SAM sites and roads which makes navigation easier. Although game manual mentions the bridges as supply choke points and calls attention to the importance of destroying them, bombing these bridges has no effect on the progress of the war. In the Amiga version of the game, successfully hitting bridges causes the deck of the bridge to disappear while its suspenders and towers remain intact. The simulation has been thoroughly thought out - the surprise is that landing on an enemy airfield means that the player has "defected", and this shows in the debriefing screen. It is also possible to land on roads - which are much narrower and trickier to land on - but this also has the same effect of landing at an enemy airport, and the simulation shows that the player has "defected" to the enemy country.

When flying over towns, one can easily spot the various buildings representing churches, hospitals, and various other buildings. Flying over power stations, one can make out the cooling towers, and so on. It is fairly easy to distinguish visually in between which area you are flying over based on recognizing the landmarks, but such navigation is not really necessary due to the waypoint computer which shows the target waypoint, distance and estimated time to reach it within the cockpit, assuming that this was set in the Mission Room.

It is not possible to fly into a "wall" when flying out of the map. The player can fly out of the map fuel runs out, but upon doing so there will be no more scenery, just flat land to fly in. The simulation also has a weather system (fog and low clouds down to 500 feet AGL) and the combat can even be in the middle of the night.

In night flights, there are no outside visual references except for the green thermal image projected onto the HUD by the LANTIRN pods. There was however, lights on the ground though from towns and military installations, which gives very limited orientation from within the cockpit.

The programmers claimed that F-16 Combat Pilot's cockpit views were based on the latest version of the F-16 at that time. The game manual states: "Following the trend in all modern aircraft towards the "glass cockpit", the instrument panel has been modified and updated many times since its first design. This latest version includes the 3 multi-function digital displays introduced as part of the MSIP avionics update programme. This layout was first evaluated in the AFTI F-16 technology demonstrator". As the game was only viewable on 4 angles from within the cockpit, there is no "outside" look of the player's aircraft, increasing the realism. Many players rely on instruments to fly with, especially in low cloud covers or night missions, which add to the realism of the simulation, but can also be boring for those looking for a quick dogfight. There is an option for a "Quickstart" but even that will require reading through the manual. Weather is random and cannot be manipulated except in the training sessions. It can be said this sim is not for the ordinary "arcade" style gamer, as the sheer depth of cockpit and campaign but relatively sparse environment are more suited for the simulator enthusiast.

=== Dynamic campaign ===
This was the first flight simulator with a dynamic campaign. After becoming player a Mission Commander (via achieving success on all five other missions without dying or failing the mission) the player can control a squadron of other pilots which could be assigned missions by the player to help win the war, and attack targets such as power stations, factories, radar installations and SAM sites.

The player can jump into the F-16 as well and perform custom mission objectives - this can be anything the player sets on the mission map, such as destroying a target destination, flying patrol, or shooting down enemies, although it is not possible to communicate with squadron while in-flight AI aircraft both ally and enemy respond to the movements of the player and adjust accordingly.

As the war progresses, missions become simpler or more complex as both sides inflict damage, and strategy (such as targeting factories and radar installations first) is required to win. Weapons and parts may even become unavailable as time goes by.

== Reception ==
Reception

Award
Publication	Award
Amstrad Action	Mastergame

Computer Gaming World approved of the game's graphics and performance, even on the original IBM PC with CGA video, and the modem play. F-16 Combat Pilot was voted "best flight simulator" by the European Computer Leisure Awards 1990.

Digital Integration repackaged and released the game in 1994 under the Action Sixteen publishing label after fixing a compatibility issue with Amiga 1200 computers.
