= Skydive! (video game) =

1999 video game

- Developers: The Groove Alliance, Gonzo Games
- Publisher: Electronic Arts
- Platforms: Microsoft Windows, Macintosh
- Release: NA: July 7, 1999; EU: 1999
- Genre: Sports
- Mode: Single-player

Skydive! Go Ahead and Jump (often stylized as SKYDIVE!) is a video game developed by The Groove Alliance and Gonzo Games and published by Electronic Arts for Windows and Macintosh in 1999.

== Reception ==
Reception

Aggregate score
Aggregator	Score
GameRankings	20%

Review scores
Publication	Score
CNET Gamecenter	2/10
Computer Games Strategy Plus	0.5/5
Computer Gaming World	2/5
GamePro	1/5
GameSpot	1.8/10
IGN	2.2/10
PC Accelerator	1/10
PC Gamer (US)	5%
PC PowerPlay	12%

The game received unfavorable reviews to overwhelming dislike according to the review aggregation website GameRankings.

It won GameSpot's award for "Worst Game of the Year".
