= Galápagos, Guadalajara =

Galápagos
- municipality
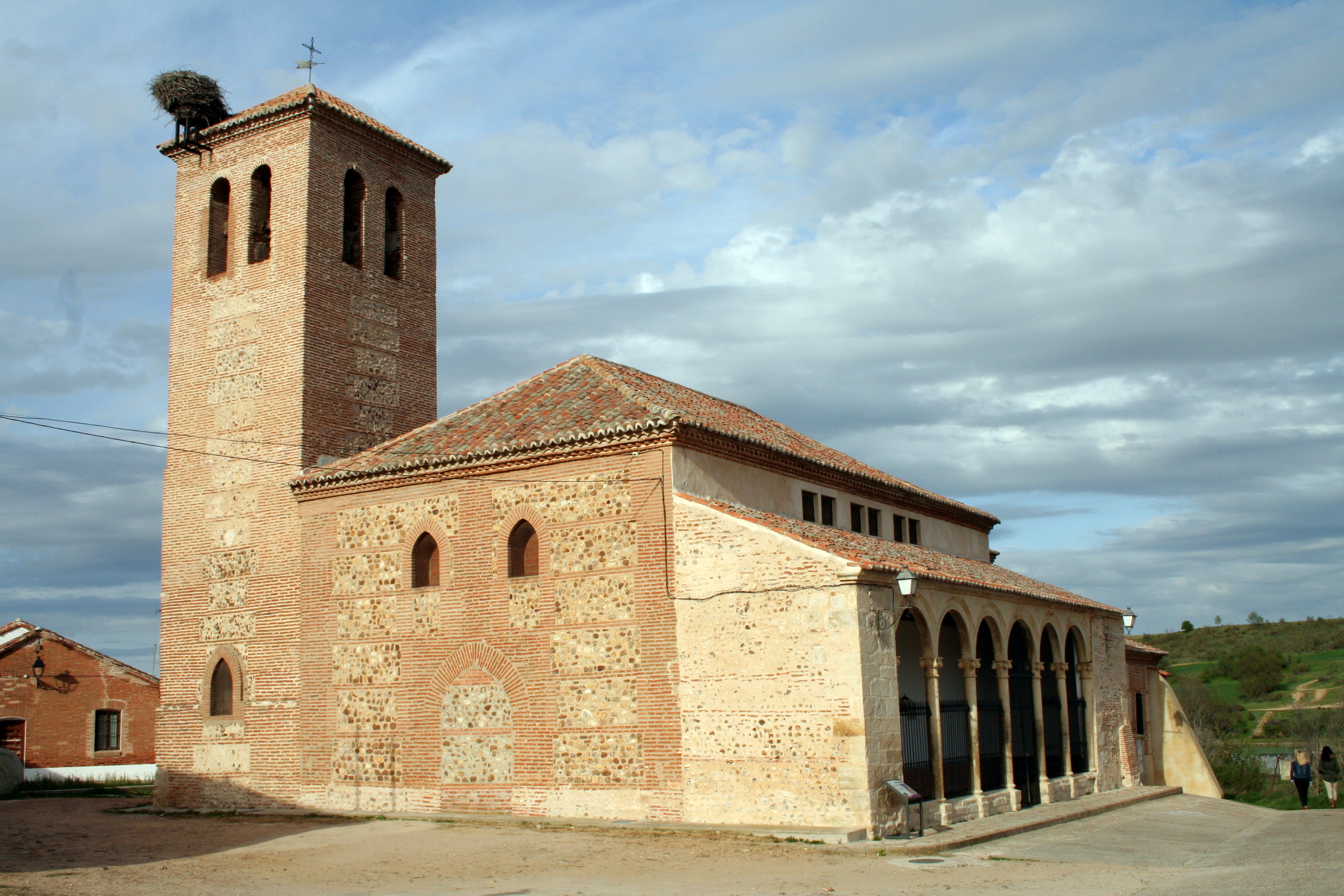

- Coat of arms

- Location within Province of Guadalajara Location within Castilla-La Mancha Location within Spain
- Country: Spain
- Province: Guadalajara
- Comarca: Campiña del Henares

Area
  - Total: 33.99 km^{2} (13.12 sq mi)
- Elevation: 736 m (2,415 ft)

Population (2025-01-01)
  - Total: 2,802
  - Density: 82.44/km^{2} (213.5/sq mi)
- Time zone: UTC+1 (CET)
  - Summer (DST): UTC+2 (CEST)

Galápagos is a municipality located in the province of Guadalajara, Spain. Its Postal Code is 19174.
