= Sword of Sodan =

1988 video game

- Amiga cover
- Developers: Discovery Software (Amiga); Visual Concepts (Apple IIGS); Innerprise Software (Genesis)
- Publishers: Discovery Software (Amiga),(Apple IIGS); Electronic Arts (Genesis); Bethesda Softworks (Mac)
- Designers: Søren Grønbech; Torben B. Larsen
- Composer: Julian LeFay
- Platforms: Amiga, Apple IIGS, Genesis/Mega Drive, Macintosh
- Release: 1988: Amiga; 1990: Genesis; 1993: Macintosh
- Genre: Hack and slash
- Mode: Single-player

Sword of Sodan is a hack and slash video game released for the Amiga in 1988 by Discovery Software, which also commissioned a port for the Apple IIGS (but not made public until 2018). A scaled-down version for the Sega Genesis was released in 1990 by Electronic Arts, and in 1993 it was released for the Apple Macintosh System 7 by Bethesda Softworks.

== Plot ==
Set in a medieval fantasy world, Lordan is the ruler of the northern kingdom. Zoras, an evil necromancer, is in his tower made of human bones, planning to make a second attempt to overthrow Lordan, after his first attempt was defeated by Sodan, the hero.

Zoras studied ancient parchments where he learned to experiment with long forgotten spells. His new knowledge enabled him to conjure all kinds of nightmarish creatures, which he sent marching toward Lordan's castle, leaving a path of death and destruction.

To protect his twin children, son Brodan and daughter Shardan, Lordan arranged for them to be taken from the castle across the Cthol mountains to the farthest corner of the land. After Lordan's defeat and death at Zoras' hands, his children were raised by an old, bitter man, who also trained them in the art of sword combat.

Before they start their journey to defeat Zoras, the old man hands over to them the sword of Sodan. Armed with the sword, they fight their way to castle Craggamoor and face the tyrannical Zoras. After they defeat Zoras, the people accept them as the true rulers and saviors of the land.

== Gameplay ==
=== Amiga ===
Amiga screenshot

There are two playable characters: Brodan or his twin sister Shardan, whose gameplay characteristics are identical despite their physical differences. The character walks in a horizontally scrolled world from left to right, defeating enemies with their swords, wielding either standing or kneeling. Though the player is also equipped with a shield, it is merely for decoration. It was completely removed from the Sega Genesis version.

Before each level starts, a map appears, showing the player's progress through the land on their way to castle Craggamoor. Scrolls give additional information about the current location. Once the player enters the castle, the map is replaced by a gloomy picture of an outside view of the castle. Most of the levels consist of simply fighting enemies with the sword, but sometimes the player must avoid traps or solve puzzles.

The player starts with five lives, an energy meter and a hit strength level. A player's energy is reduced every time they are hit by enemies, but their hit strength can be increased by using potions. There are different types of potions. Some increase hit strength, some give an extra life, some provide short-term invincibility, while still others kill the current opponent immediately.

There are eleven different areas, five in the area surrounding the castle, and six within. The player starts at their own city gate, and progresses through the countryside towards the castle, passing through city streets, a forest and a graveyard. Once within the castle, the player wanders through catacomb-like levels, which lead to the wizard's tower at the end. The world is inhabited by 13 different enemies and a single supporting character, the ostrich-like creature called "the animal".

=== Sega Genesis ===
While the gameplay mechanic is very similar to the Amiga version, there are several differences. First, enemies attack from both directions, instead of the single direction in the Amiga game. Second, the player relies more regularly on potions, which are also dropped more frequently and can combined to achieve different effects. Third, the areas have been reduced from eleven to eight, with some completely deleted (e.g. the forest), while others combined. Finally, there are only eight enemies, as opposed to the thirteen in the Amiga game, however, the enemies are spawned more frequently, and in different areas.

== Development ==
Sword of Sodan was created by three Danish engineers from Discovery Software in 1988, while a simultaneous conversion port was worked on for the Apple IIGS by Visual Concepts. Two years later Innerprise Software, who purchased the game rights, created a scaled-down port for the Sega Genesis system which differs in reduced graphics and sound quality, as well as notable changes in overall gameplay. The Genesis port was published by Electronic Arts in North America and Europe, and by Sega in Japan. The game was again ported in 1993 by Bethesda Softworks for the Apple Macintosh System 7.

=== Unreleased Apple IIGS port ===
A partially completed port for the Apple IIGS was advertised and shown at the CES Expo in 1989 by Visual Concepts, Ltd (then known as "Visionware"). Playable with a joystick, it was approximately 70% complete. Soon after, a three level self-playing demo was released and displayed in stores, virtually indistinguishable from the Amiga version in terms of graphics and animation fluidity. Originally set to be released in mid-1989, it was pushed back several months when its programmer, Scott Patterson, was fired for misconduct and a replacement had to be found. Programmer Jimmy Huey was eventually hired, however Discovery Software went bankrupt soon after in 1990. Despite these developments, appearing in magazines ads, on display in stores and the game being included on vendor's price lists, the port remained in limbo and never released. Nearly 30 years later, on May 26, 2018, the unreleased Apple IIGS port was unearthed and made public, revealing an entirely playable and very polished version of the game. It was revealed all levels are present, however five out of eleven (primarily castle areas) are missing enemy sprites or obstacles. The Apple IIGS source code required to complete programming of the game has still yet to be found.

=== Canceled sequel and other ports ===
Ports for the IBM PC, Atari ST and the Commodore 64 systems were planned but never developed.

A sequel was developed but never released, however a single screenshot was shown in a magazine.

== Reception ==
According to programmer Søren Grønbech's homepage, Sword of Sodan on the Amiga was at the top 10 selling charts for more than six months and selling about 55,000 copies. Due to the violent nature of the game, it was indexed by the German BPjS/BPjM in 1989.

The original 1988 release for Amiga got mostly favorable reviews by the magazines, with praise for the graphics, which included large, detailed sprites, unusual for that time. However, the budget re-release in 1993 was met with negative reviews. For the Sega version, websites like I-Mockery.com or Somethingawful.com mocked the game for its bad graphics, annoying sound effects, frustrating controls and difficult gameplay.

Amiga 1989 reviews:

- "If you buy one Amiga action game this year, this has got be it." – 9/10
- "I was well pleased with Sword of Sodan." – 85%
- "If you're looking for a big game, they don't come anymore impressive than this" – 83%
- "It's a shame then that the gameplay doesn't live up to the standards set by the aesthetics." – 62%
- Computer Gaming World gave the game a positive review, praising the game's graphics and sound but noting the game is relatively short.
- "...this game has been programmed by magicians." L.R. Shannon, New York Times

Amiga 1993 reviews (budget re-release):

- "Pity, but the graphics have overtaken the gameplay." – 52%
- "Don't be swayed by the half-decent static screenshots, because Sword of Sodan is crap." – 34%
- "Great big fat and juicy graphics do not make a fun game." – 29%

Sega Genesis reviews:

- "Just walking around slashing things with your chopper is exceptionally monotonous after a couple of plays." – 57%
- "Even the first level requires mastery of the crappy controls, and the game is just too damn boring to warrant enough repeated attempts to get "good" at it." – 46% (somethingawful.com)

Apple IIGS:

- "Visuals on the IIGS reach a boggling new high with Discovery Software's Sword of Sodan. It's another hack-and-slash action game but with hugh on-screen characters, remarkable graphic detail, and outstanding digitized sound effects."

In 2009, GamesRadar included it among the games with untapped franchise potential, commenting, "Though it looks and plays clunky now, it was a technical marvel at the time."

== Sales ==
Sword of Sodan was one of the bestselling games for Amiga at the height of that system's popularity.
