= Cope-Com =

- Industry: Video games
- Founded: 1987
- Founder: Martin B. Pedersen; Torben B. Larsen

Cope-Com is a Danish Amiga software developer founded in 1987 by Martin B. Pedersen and Torben B. Larsen.

== History ==
Martin Pedersen started out in 1985 with an Amstrad computer in which he did a conversion game title called The Vikings. At the same time Torben B. Larsen was doing the graphics for the same game on the Commodore 64 and that is how the two of them met. Feeling limited with the Amstrad and its technical abilities, Martin B. Pedersen decided to take a closer look at the new Amiga 1000 computer which was about to be released. They were impressed by the better resolution, colour palette and sound sampling of the Amiga.

== Game publishing ==
Cope-Com developed two games for the Amiga: Hybris and Battle Squadron, both in 1989. Both were vertical-scrolling shoot 'em ups and they were critical successes. Battle Squadron was later released for modern systems such as iOS, Android, AmigaOS 4, Windows, OS X and MorphOS in the early 2010s, titled Battle Squadron ONE.
