= Bill Walsh College Football =

1993 video game

- Cover art
- Developers: High Score Productions (Sega Genesis & Sega CD); Visual Concepts (SNES)
- Publisher: EA Sports
- Platforms: Super NES, Sega Genesis, Sega CD
- Release: Genesis: NA: August 1993; EU: September 1993; Sega CD: NA: December 1993; EU: March 1994; Super NES: NA: February 1994
- Genres: Sports; American football
- Modes: Single-player; Multiplayer

Bill Walsh College Football is an American football video game released for the Super NES, Genesis, and Sega CD. It is one of the earliest video games to deal with the sport at a college level and is built around the fame of coach Bill Walsh. The game was followed by a sequel, Bill Walsh College Football '95.

== Summary ==
The game features 24 teams from the 1992 season and 24 historical teams. Because EA Sports did not acquire the licensing for the names of the more famous schools, these teams carry the names of the school cities and states rather than the school names.

== Teams ==
(non licensed college names listed in parentheses)

- Arizona
- Boston (Boston College)
- College Station (Texas A&M)
- Colorado
- Columbus (Ohio State)
- Florida
- Georgia
- Hawaii
- Kansas
- Miami
- Michigan
- Nebraska
- Provo (BYU)
- Pullman (Washington State)
- Raleigh (NC State)
- S.C. (Southern California)
- South Bend (Notre Dame)
- Syracuse
- Stanford
- State College (Penn State)
- Tallahassee (Florida State)
- Tennessee
- Washington

=== Gameplay modes ===
- Exhibition, with play as any team from either the 1992 or historical seasons in a single game
- 16-team single elimination playoff with any team from the 1992 season.
- 16-team single elimination playoff with any of the all-time teams.

== Reception ==
Reception

Review score
Publication	Score
AllGame	3.5/5 (SNES); 3/5 (GEN)

Computer Gaming World in 1993 stated that the Genesis version of Bill Walsh College Football "provides the best sports action yet to be seen in a cartridge product". The magazine praised the AI as being "head and shoulders above any other sports game. Simply put, it reacts". Computer Gaming World concluded that while computer-based sports games remained superior, Walsh was an example of those that made purchasing a console "more than worthwhile".
