= Galapagos (video game) =

1997 video game

- Developer: Anark Game Studios
- Publisher: Electronic Arts
- Platforms: Microsoft Windows, Mac OS
- Release: Microsoft Windows: NA: October 7, 1997; Mac OS: NA: October 9, 1997
- Genres: Action, Simulation
- Mode: Single-player

Galapagos: Mendel's Escape is a computer action game developed by Anark Game Studios and published by Electronic Arts in 1997. It is perhaps best known for its use of "artificial life technology" to control the main character, only giving the player indirect control of the creature by manipulating the environment. Because of this, Galapagos has been called the first commercial video game to use artificial life methodology, though it was beaten to the market by Creatures, whose development cycle overlapped with that of Galapagos.

== Gameplay ==
The main character of Galapagos is AI-controlled and only indirectly responds to changes the player makes to its environment. This character is capable of maneuvering through the environment while avoiding surfaces and obstacles it has previously learned is harmful, entirely on its own.

However, the creature does not know how to manipulate the levers and switches found throughout the various areas in the game, so it is up to the player to help. As it moves around, the camera angle changes to reveal the new obstacles. Correct manipulation of the devices, through puzzle solving and careful timing, is needed to succeed.

== Story ==
A synthetic bug-like creature known as Mendel (named after Gregor Mendel, the founder of Mendelian genetics) has just been created in a dystopian lab in the world of Galapagos (a reference to the Galapagos Islands). Mendel is the first of its kind, a prototype which will one day be used to create an army of "belligerent autonomous agents, to be used as instruments of dominion, to conquer other worlds for the exploitation of their resources". Mendel turns out completely harmless and lonely, so they instead plan to study and dissect the creature to continue their plans of creating a "xenocidal war machine". The player character has full control over the laboratory environment and wishes to subvert their plans by helping Mendel escape from the lab, and ultimately leave Galapagos.

== Development ==
The technology used to create Mendel's artificial intelligence is a proprietary system called Non-stationary Entropic Reduction Mapping, or NERM. NERM was designed to be self-organizing, meaning that it does not require prior knowledge of the system that it controls.

Mendel was purposely designed to look unlike any real world animal, so that players would not have too many preconceptions about how he should act and what he is capable of. The environments in Galapagos were created with a proprietary tool called Leveller.

== Reception ==
Reception

Aggregate score
Aggregator	Score
GameRankings	58%

Review scores
Publication	Score
GameSpot	6/10
Next Generation	4/5

Stephen Poole of GameSpot said that "you get the feeling that Anark came up with [the NERM] technology and then had to find some way to make use of it." He complained about Mendel's slow movement and the frustration caused by the shifting camera angles, and said he could not figure out how to make Mendel learn anything. He concluded that while the game is undeniably engrossing and addictive, many gamers would not have the patience to endure its aggravations long enough to get their money's worth out of it.

Kathy Tafel of MacAddict said of the game, "it can be exceedingly frustrating. [...] in Galapagos the game moves the camera at will (although it's generally centered on Mendel). This can make parts of the game almost impossible to play."

Next Generation, reviewing the Macintosh version of the game, said the puzzles are solid and the task of teaching Mandel is interesting and rewarding if given time. They concluded, "Enjoying Galapagos requires time, patience, and imagination. Otherwise, it might be easier to stick to games that never access anything higher than the spinal cord."
