= John Madden Football II =

1991 American football video game

- Developers: D.C. True, Ltd.
- Publisher: Electronic Arts
- Series: Madden NFL
- Platform: MS-DOS
- Release: 1991
- Genre: Sports
- Modes: Single-player, multiplayer,

John Madden Football II is a football video game released for MS-DOS in 1991. It serves as direct sequel to the original 1988 John Madden Football game released for PC and was released during the same year as John Madden Football '92 for the Sega Genesis. This edition has updates such as larger playbooks and more insight from John Madden.

== Description ==
John Madden Football II comes with a game manual, two for the defense, and one for the offense. It does not use real NFL team or player names.

== Reception ==
Computer Gaming World in 1992 wrote that despite a very sophisticated playbook, John Madden Football II "has produced a state-of-the-art product — assuming that the year is 1989". The reviewer stated that while players would quickly turn the sound off, "the graphics are even worse!", and criticized the inability to play an entire season and flawed defensive plays and coverage. He recommended Konami's NFL over Madden.
