= Madden NFL Mobile =

2014 mobile video game

Madden NFL Mobile Madden NFL Arcade Edition
- The Madden Mobile 20 title cover featuring Patrick Mahomes
- Developer: EA Tiburon
- Publishers: WW: EA Sports; VIE: Garena
- Series: Madden NFL
- Platforms: Android, iOS, iPadOS, macOS, tvOS, visionOS
- Release: August 26, 2014 (Season 1); August 19, 2015 (Season 2); August 17, 2016 (Season 3); August 15, 2017 (Season 4); August 15, 2018 (Season 5); July 30, 2019 (Season 6); August 6, 2020 (Season 7); August 20, 2021 (Season 8); August 18, 2022 (Season 9); August 10, 2023 (Season 10); August 7, 2024 (Season 11); August 7, 2025 (Season 12); August 6, 2026 (Season 13, Madden NFL 27 Arcade Edition)
- Genre: Sports
- Modes: Single-player, multiplayer

Madden NFL Mobile is an American football mobile sports game based on the National Football League, developed and published by EA Sports. An entry in the Madden NFL series, the game was released for Android and iOS devices on August 26, 2014.

== Gameplay ==
Madden NFL Mobile (MM) began as a mobile version of Madden Ultimate Team (MUT), with features like players and cards being available. To earn these, players participate in "Live Events", which can earn them card packs and coins. Another mode that is available is a season mode. In prior versions of Madden Mobile, this was called "Season" mode, which allows players to play a full 17-game season, which extends to the Super Bowl. This feature was removed in MADDEN OVERDRIVE, but was reintroduced in 2020 as "seasons".

Being a freemium game, players can spend real-life money to purchase packs, in game currency, and "Bundles" that include a certain number of packs and a topper of an item. The game is also level-based, and features like bonuses for rewards that increase as one reaches higher levels. There is also another mode labeled "Leagues" where players may join or create a league alongside other players that face in Tournaments against other leagues, offering a chat box, goals with rewards such as players and tokens. The ability for players to send other players within the league packs was discontinued with MM 2017.

The game itself features standard football rules, such as scoring mechanics including touchdowns, field goals, and safeties. It also features real plays categorized as "long passes", "short passes", "play action passes", and "run" plays for the offense; "man coverage", "zone coverage", and "blitz" plays for the defense. It also features multiple special plays available at any point including punts, fake punts, field goals, quarterback kneels, and fake field goals. There are also up to four different styles for kickoffs, kick returns, punt, punt returns (left, right, middle, duplicates, onside kicks, etc.) The game was connectable with Facebook to allow for more social features, but has been discontinued as of Madden Mobile 26. Though players can also create unlinked accounts.

=== Seasons ===
Seasons have been a part of a game since the start, however have been changed every year and were eviscerated in Madden Overdrive. In Madden Mobile 20, they were brought back and new features were added to make it a more realistic experience for the player.

There are multiple seasons modes, including 2025 NFL season involving the realistic season and managing teams.

=== Events ===
Events is a game mode in which players may participate in various challenges for rewards. Typically, there is no charge to play Events once, but replays of some events must be played using an in-game reward token called "Blitz Tokens". The use of "Stamina" to play events was eliminated with the launch of Madden Overdrive and was reintroduced in season six.

Completing these events earn the player rewards, such as card packs, coins, players, experience points, or one of the program specific currencies that were rolled out with the Madden Overdrive version of the game. There are also seasonal live events for things such as Black Friday, Thanksgiving, and Christmas, Easter as well as Super Bowl and Playoff Recap events. Every day of the week, there are new live events.

=== Head to Head ===
Madden Overdrive did away with the Head to Head mode with Madden Overdrive, replacing it with the game's namesake "Overdrive" mode. Madden NFL Overdrive removed the original head-to-head format and replaced it with the Overdrive mode. This new take on Head to Head features real-time multiplayer for the first time in franchise history, in which both players try to score as many "Fantasy Points" as possible in a 3-minute game. However, the gamemode was eventually scraped and replaced with the original Head to Head mode in MM 22.

=== Blitz Tournaments ===
Originally implemented in MM18, Blitz Tournaments were a mode that took place every weekend that put opponents in a head-to-head match, usually with a modification to the gameplay (i.e. Only being able to call pass plays, having a limited number of plays to score, etc.). Players had to get as many wins as possible over the course of the weekend, with the top players receiving sought after player cards as a reward. This mode was released to overwhelming success, becoming one of the most popular game modes in Madden Mobile's history.

When Madden NFL Overdrive launched, the mode was not initially included in the game, which came as both a shock and disappointment to many returning players. However, the mode was re-released in December 2018, with a few changes. Now, blitz tournaments run through the entire week, instead of just the weekends. Tournaments now use Overdrive instead of the original head-to-head mode, and have yet to include any gameplay modifiers in the tournaments thus far. Doing well in these tournaments awards players with a currency they can use for a variety of rewards, including elite and diamond players, grab bag packs, and 94 OVR Blitz Tournament Masters. While the mode is popular, it most likely will not see the success it had the year before.

=== Leagues ===
Joining a League will give the player user interaction with other players inside the game. In a league, one can play each other in a head-to-head match for bragging rights. There are League Tournaments that a league can play in as a team: all players participating in the tournament will have three drives to score as high as possible against another league. The rewards of tournaments is league XP, used to level up. Finally, there are League Championships, in which players compete against each other in a championship tournament that will rank them based on their performances in the tournament.

=== Auction House ===
The Auction House is a place where players may bid/buy cards. While since its inception, the Auction House was a place where players could buy items being sold by other players, that system was changed mid-season in MM 18 to a brokered auction house, in which a bot acts as an intermediary between players buying and selling their cards. Bidding allows the player to bid slowly against others with a slightly lower chance of winning the item. Buying the item allows the player to immediately end the bidding process and earn the item for the amount bought for. The player may not buy the item if the buy price is less than the bidding price. A common activity on the Auction House is referred to as "sniping," or buying items for low prices as soon as they are available and reselling them for profit. The Auction house shuts down a few days before a new season begins, but posting to the Auction House is disabled 3 days prior to going down. Ten percent of the coins made on the transaction are deducted as a tax. The auction house became no longer available in MM22.

=== Players ===
Players come in the form of cards or captains. Cards can vary in power, scarcity, tier, and the stats on the card. All cards feature a power, a key aspect of the player's team which determines their performance in all multiplayer game modes, such as Overdrive and Arena. Captains are exclusive to the Overdrive game mode, and give boosts to the player's team. They also give a Captain Bonus when the player completes the bonus objective, which gives the player extra points in the match. Different Captains can be unlocked in several ways, including completing a fixed number of matches or scoring a certain number of points with a captain.

=== Packs ===
Packs are another element to the game. Prior to the launch of Madden Overdrive, it was a major element. However, most traditional packs were eliminated and were replaced by packs purchased with various tokens and currencies available in-game. However, some packs require spending of actual money, in the form of Madden Cash. There are many different packs available for different times and lengths. Some packs such as the Pro Pack are available 24/7, while others (such as Super Bowl) are available for a few days. Packs could include rare collectibles, bronze to onyx players, etc. and vary in value.

There are uniforms for all 32 teams and some special uniforms that are earned from playing events. The default uniform depends on the team being used. Some special uniforms come out for example throwback uniforms and special uniforms for the events. Uniforms may be purchased with in-game coins, cash, and gems. They may also be obtained through packs.

== Release ==
The game received a soft launch on the Canadian App Store on August 12, 2014.

The game was released on the iOS App Store and on Android's Google Play, the same day that Madden NFL 15 was released on console. A large update, coinciding with the release of Madden NFL 16, was released in August 2015. The new features were added in the season such as achievements, league improvements, a redesigned hub, more Live Events, and better tuning. Seasonal updates for Madden NFL 17 and Madden NFL 18 were also released. For the 2018–19 season, the game was renamed to Madden NFL Overdrive. It was renamed back to Madden Mobile for the 2019–20 season. In 2020 - 21 season, the game was renamed once again as Madden NFL 21 Mobile to known as a mobile version of Madden NFL 21 instead of being a separate mobile game. Since then, the year on the game title was changed after each season update.

=== Madden NFL Arcade Edition ===
A separate standalone version of Madden NFL Mobile, called Madden NFL Arcade Edition was released as the Apple Arcade version of the Madden NFL series for iOS, iPadOS, macOS, tvOS and visionOS on August 4, 2026. This version bring the same custom engine and gameplay from Madden NFL Mobile, but without in-app purchases and can be played offline.

== Reception ==
Reception

Review scores
Publication	Score
Gamezebo	3.5/5
Pocket Gamer	3.5/5

Madden NFL Mobile got mixed reviews. On Metacritic, the game got 68%. Pocket Gamer gave it 7 out of 10 and said that "Madden NFL Mobile has come a long way, but it feels like it could still go a bit further. It's absolutely worth a look if you're a fan, but it's probably not going to rock your world." Phandroid said that "Whether the annoyances of microtransactions and modern-day mobile gaming annoy you, we at least appreciate that there's a pretty good game beneath the green veil of dollar bills EA decided to decorate it with.".

== Compatibility ==
As of August 4, 2025, game controllers used for the PlayStation and Xbox consoles are compatible for Madden Mobile 26 via Bluetooth.
