= Madden NFL Football =

2011 video game

- Logo for Madden NFL Football
- Developer: EA North Carolina
- Publisher: EA Sports
- Series: Madden NFL
- Platform: Nintendo 3DS
- Release: NA: March 22, 2011; EU: March 25, 2011
- Genre: Sports
- Modes: Single-player multiplayer

Madden NFL Football (sometimes mislabeled as Madden NFL 3D) is a 2011 sports video game developed by EA North Carolina and published by EA Sports for the Nintendo 3DS. First images of the game were shown by IGN in February 2011. The game was released as a launch title for the Nintendo 3DS on March 22, 2011, in North America (whereas the release date had been scheduled for March 27, at first).

== Features ==
The game inherits features from past Madden games. Other than the traditional 11-on-11, the game also features a 5-on-5 mode, returning from Madden NFL 09 All-Play on the Wii. The 5-on-5 mode can also be used in Season Mode. The game also features GameFlow, a feature from Madden NFL 11 where the AI automatically selects the play depending on the game situation. Players also can select whether or not to include GameFlow, or play with an arcade version. Standard versions are also available. From Madden NFL 10, also from the Wii, is Spotlight Moment, where the game goes into slow motion whenever a critical event occurs. Also from the Wii games, players can Call Your Shots, where players press the Y button to call their own routes for the receivers.

== Reception ==
Reception

Aggregate scores
Aggregator	Score
GameRankings	50%
Metacritic	49/100

Review scores
Publication	Score
G4	3/5
Game Informer	6/10
GamePro	2/5
GameRevolution	C−
GameSpot	4/10
GameTrailers	5.1/10
Giant Bomb	1/5
IGN	5/10
Nintendo Life	5/10
Nintendo Power	6/10
Nintendo World Report	6/10
USA Today	3.5/4

The game was met with very mixed to negative reception upon release, as GameRankings gave it a score of 50%, while Metacritic gave it 49 out of 100.
