= Charles Davis (defensive back) =

American football player & analyst (born 1964)

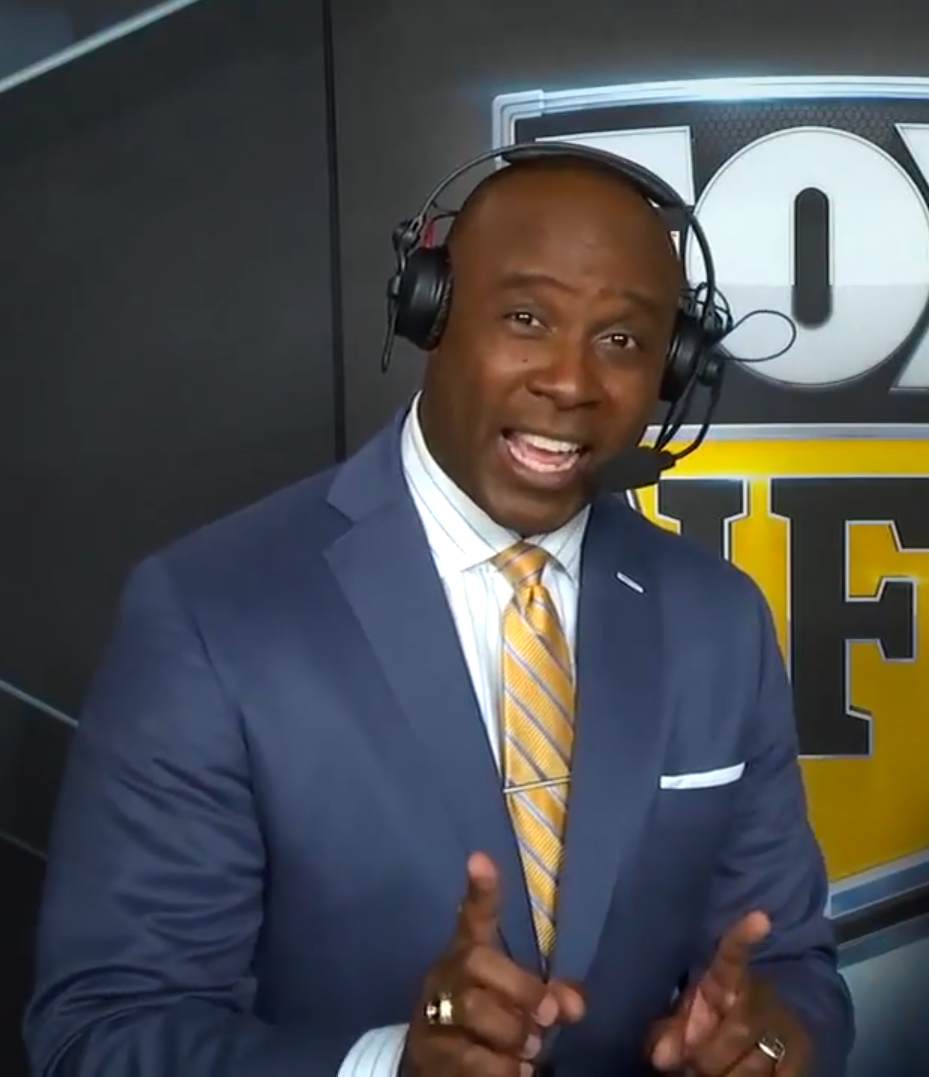
- Davis in 2018

No. 22
- Position: Safety

Personal information
- Born: November 14, 1964 (age 61); Elizabethton, Tennessee, U.S.
- Listed height: 6 ft 2 in (1.88 m)
- Listed weight: 195 lb (88 kg)

Career information
- High school: New Paltz (New Paltz, New York)
- College: Tennessee
- NFL draft: 1987: undrafted

Career history
- Dallas Cowboys (1987)*
- * Offseason or practice squad member only

Charles Franklin Davis (born November 14, 1964) is an American football analyst. He is currently the lead analyst for College Football on CBS, working alongside Brad Nessler. He is also an analyst for Tennessee Titans preseason games, working alongside Dan Hellie. Along with Brandon Gaudin, he is the analyst for the Madden NFL series since 2017. He is also an analyst for the NFL Network, and has previously worked with Fox Sports, TBS, ESPN, The Golf Channel and Sun Sports (now FanDuel Sports Network Sun).

Davis was a safety for the Tennessee Volunteers from 1982 to 1986, though he went undrafted in the 1987 NFL draft. He earned a master's degree in history while a student at Tennessee. He resides in Windermere, Florida, with his wife Lisa, a University of Tennessee law school graduate. He has a son, Parker, who played basketball at Rollins College, and is now in graduate school at Georgetown, and a daughter Taylor, who founded the CLR Los Angeles candle brand.

== Early life ==
Davis was born in Elizabethton, Tennessee, but he and his family moved to New Paltz, New York, when he was two years old. His father, Franklin, was a high school football and basketball coach. Davis played football, basketball and baseball at New Paltz High School. Davis played quarterback, defensive back, and kicker for the high school football team.

A dual-threat quarterback, during his senior year he passed for 742 yards and six touchdowns, and he ran for 738 yards and eleven touchdowns. He also registered four interceptions on defense, and completed 15 of 20 extra points and a field goal as a kicker. He earned All-State honors his junior and senior seasons.

== College career ==
=== 1983 season ===
Davis accepted a football scholarship from the University of Tennessee, in part because it was the school where one of his childhood heroes, Condredge Holloway, had played. After redshirting during his first season in 1982, he was moved from quarterback to free safety and worked his way into the starting lineup during the 1983 season. He had interceptions against Pittsburgh and LSU early in the year, and a key interception that helped preserve Tennessee's 7–0 win against Rutgers. He registered 12 tackles in the Vols' 41–34 win over Alabama, and had 5 tackles and recovered a fumble in the team's loss to Auburn. He finished the season with 58 tackles (39 solo) and a team-leading 4 interceptions.

=== 1984 season ===
During Tennessee's win over Washington State at the start of the 1984 season, Davis suffered a broken fibula. Although he played through the pain and finished the game, he missed the next three games. He tallied 8 tackles in Tennessee's 28–27 win over Alabama, and had interceptions late in the season against Kentucky and Vanderbilt. He finished the season with 34 tackles (22 solo), 4 passes defensed, and 2 interceptions.

=== 1985 season ===
Davis was named to the Preseason All-SEC team at the beginning of Tennessee's memorable 1985 season. For the year, he registered 59 tackles (33 solo), forced 2 fumbles, and 2 passes defensed. In Tennessee's 35–7 win over Miami in the 1986 Sugar Bowl, Davis had 6 tackles and an interception.

=== 1986 season ===
Davis was again named to the Preseason All-SEC team for the 1986 season. In the third quarter of a close game against New Mexico, he intercepted a pass and returned it 55 yards for a touchdown. He finished the year with 83 tackles (52 solo) and 4 interceptions. He was named to the SEC Academic Honor Roll at the end of the season.

Davis graduated with a degree in political science prior to his senior year with the Tennessee football team, and subsequently earned a master's degree in history.

== Broadcasting career ==
=== Early career ===
Pre-draft measurables
Height	Weight	40-yard dash	Vertical jump
6 ft 2 3/8 in (1.89 m)	195 lb (88 kg)	4.60 s	32.5 in (0.83 m)
All values from NFL Combine

Davis was signed as an undrafted free agent by the Dallas Cowboys after the 1987 NFL draft on April 30. He was waived on August 6.

After not making the team, he enrolled in graduate school. One of the first games he called was the University of Tennessee's 1987 Orange-and-White Game (an annual scrimmage played at the end of spring practice), in which he worked alongside long-time Vol Network play-by-play commentator John Ward.

Davis' initial career path took him into a variety of jobs related to sports. He was an assistant coach at the University of the Pacific for one season (1989), worked for the Southeastern Conference and was hired as the director of the United States Olympic Training Center. He was an assistant athletic director at Stanford University for three years, 1994–1996. In 1996, Davis became manager of sports operations on multipurpose fields and sports programming at the field house at Disney's Wide World of Sports. In October 1998, Davis became the first African-American to be a tournament director of a PGA Tour golf event, when he led the Walt Disney World Golf Classic.

In 1997, Fox Sports South hired him to serve as an analyst on college football games. Davis also worked at radio station 740 The Team in Orlando, Florida, co-hosting Clarke and Davis, a morning show, along with local sportscaster Pat Clarke (along with various special guests including "The Pastor" Sean Fitzgerald, Glenn Dehmer and Steve Gunter) from July 2000 until July 2002. During this same period, he worked as a sideline reporter during Jefferson Pilot's SEC Game of the Week, and co-hosted the Sunshine Network's evening sports show, Sunshine Network Live. He called Arena Football League games for the AFL on NBC from 2003 to 2004. He has also been a frequent commentator on The Golf Channel, appearing on program's such as Viewer's Forum and the Grey Goose 19th Hole.

=== National Broadcasting ===
In basketball, Davis worked as a sideline reporter for CBS's coverage of the 2001 and 2002 NCAA Men's Tournaments.

Starting with the 2002 College Football season, Davis joined TBS as a game analyst, paired primarily with Ron Thulin through the 2006 season. Additionally he worked as a sideline reporter for regular season and playoff games on the NBA on TNT.

At the end of the 2006 season, Davis joined Fox Sports as an analyst. He called the 2007 BCS National Championship Game with Barry Alvarez and Thom Brennaman, and the 2008 and 2009 games with only Brennaman. He and Brennaman also called Appalachian State's upset of Michigan in 2007 on the Big Ten Network.

At Fox Sports, he primarily worked on Big Ten Network games from in 2007 & 2008, then transitioned to the NFL on FOX for the 2009 & 2010 season.

Fox Sports began expanding their college football portfolio and hired Gus Johnson as their lead college football broadcaster in time for the 2011 season. Davis was paired with Johnson on the lead crew for college football games from 2011 through 2014. Johnson and Davis also worked a handful of NFL games when an additional crew was needed.

Davis was featured within NFL Network’s exclusive coverage of the Senior Bowl and NFL Scouting Combine. He was also an analyst on Path to the Draft, which provides in-depth analysis on prospective draft choices and a look at each NFL team's needs during the off-season with host Paul Burmeister and Mike Mayock. From 2007 to 2009, Davis was an analyst on NFL Network's College Football Now, a show that brought fans a daily dose of college football highlights, news and analysis. In addition to his duties in studio at NFL Network, Davis also served as a game analyst for the network's broadcasts of the 2007 Texas Bowl. From 2007 to 2008, he served as an analyst for the Tampa Bay Buccaneers preseason schedule.

Davis joined the NFL on Fox postgame show in October 2008, appearing with Jimmy Johnson and Terry Bradshaw. He appeared with Chris Rose, Barry Switzer, and Johnson on December 7, 2008, for the BCS results shows. He also called Atlanta Falcons preseason games with Tim Brant and previously, Vince Cellini.

In 2014, Davis joined Bob Papa to provide game commentary at Super Bowl XLVIII for NFL Films' World Feed.

In 2015, Davis returned full-time to the NFL on FOX joining Thom Brennaman and Tony Siragusa.

In 2016, Davis alongside Brandon Gaudin (who also calls Big Ten college football as well as select NFL games) became the new commentators for the Madden NFL video game franchise, debuting in Madden NFL 17 replacing Phil Simms and Jim Nantz. The two continued as commentators for Madden NFL 18, Madden NFL 19, Madden NFL 20, Madden NFL 21, Madden NFL 22, Madden NFL 23, Madden NFL 24, and Madden NFL 25.

Starting with the 2017 NFL season, Davis became part of Fox's number 2 team with Kevin Burkhardt and Pam Oliver.

In 2020, Davis returned to CBS to replace Dan Fouts as the network's number 2 game analyst paired with Ian Eagle. After five seasons in that post, CBS announced it had tapped Davis as its lead college football analyst, replacing Gary Danielson upon his retirement at the end of the 2025 college football season, with J. J. Watt set to replace him beginning with the 2025 NFL season.

Davis was laid off from ESPN in July 2026 as part of a mass layoff.
