= Madden NFL 27 =

2026 video game by EA Orlando

- Standard edition cover featuring Chicago Bears quarterback Caleb Williams
- Developer: EA Orlando
- Publisher: EA Sports
- Series: Madden NFL
- Engine: Frostbite
- Platforms: iOS; iPadOS; macOS; tvOS; visionOS; Nintendo Switch 2; PlayStation 5; Windows; Xbox Series X/S
- Release: iOS, iPadOS, macOS, tvOS, visionOS; August 4, 2026; Nintendo Switch 2, PlayStation 5, Windows, Xbox Series X/S; August 13, 2026
- Genre: Sports
- Modes: Single-player, multiplayer

Madden NFL 27 is an American football video game developed by EA Orlando and published by EA Sports. Based on the National Football League (NFL), it is the 37th installment of the Madden NFL series, following Madden NFL 26.

On June 4, 2026, the official release date was announced as August 13, 2026. A subsequent announcement on July 14 confirmed an earlier Apple Arcade on August 4. The game also launched on Nintendo Switch 2, PlayStation 5, Windows, and Xbox Series X/S. Caleb Williams was announced as the game's cover athlete. The cover depicts Williams throwing a pass while jumping in front of the Chicago skyline, made to look like the original advertisements for Michael Jordan's Air Jordans in his Jumpman pose. Williams is the first Chicago Bears player on the game's standard cover. (Note: Bears lineman Roberto Garza was the cover athlete for the Spanish language version of Madden NFL 09.)

The game includes several changes to Madden's franchise mode, including a "persona engine", which EA Sports called "the biggest change to player behavior, negotiations, weekly management, news and free agency that we've ever made. For the first time ever, players in a sports game finally feel human and it's all cohesively designed to work together." It was announced that there will also be more detailed player contracts and "smarter defensive AI" in gameplay, among other features. It also features revamped team introductions, which include unique traditions. Furthermore, players on console can now be able to run above the standard 60fps target with performance mode, with PlayStation 5 Pro targeting 100-120fps, PlayStation 5 and Xbox Series X targeting 90fps, which is added in a Madden NFL 97 inspired update on November 18, 2026, and Nintendo Switch 2 targeting 60fps on docked mode and 40fps on undocked mode.

== Reception ==
Reception

Aggregate scores
Aggregator	Score
Metacritic	(PS5) 78/100 (XSXS) 78/100
OpenCritic	61% recommend

Review scores
Publication	Score
Game Informer	6.75/10
GameSpot	7/10
IGN	8/10
Nintendo Life	8/10
Nintendo World Report	6/10
Shacknews	7/10

Madden NFL 27 received "generally favorable" reviews according to review aggregator website Metacritic. OpenCritic determined that 61% of critics recommend the game.
