= Madden NFL =

American football video game series

- Series logo (2020–present)
- Genre: Sports (American football)
- Developers: EA Orlando; Visual Concepts; High Score Productions; Blue Sky Productions; Electronic Arts; D.C. True, Ltd. Park Place Productions; Bethesda Softworks; Halestorm; Tiertex Design Studios; Stormfront Studios; Exient Entertainment; Budcat Creations; Floodgate Entertainment infiniteMonkeys; Hudson Soft
- Publishers: EA Sports; THQ; Black Pearl Software; Malibu Games; Hudson Soft
- Platforms: Amiga, Super NES, Genesis/Mega Drive, Game Gear, 3DO, Nintendo 64, GameCube, Wii, Wii U, Game Boy, Game Boy Color, Game Boy Advance, Nintendo DS, Windows, macOS, MS-DOS, PlayStation, PlayStation 2 PlayStation 3, PlayStation 4, PlayStation 5, PlayStation Portable, PlayStation Vita, Saturn, Xbox, Xbox 360, Xbox One, Xbox Series X/S, iOS, Nintendo 3DS, Android, BlackBerry PlayBook, Arcade, Nintendo Switch 2
- First release: John Madden Football; June 1, 1988
- Latest release: Madden NFL 27; August 13, 2026

Madden NFL (known as John Madden Football until 1993) is an American football sports video game series developed by EA Orlando for EA Sports. The franchise, named after Pro Football Hall of Fame coach and commentator John Madden, had sold over 150 million copies as of 2021. From 2004 until 2022, it was the only officially licensed National Football League (NFL) video game series, and has influenced many players and coaches of the physical sport. Among the series' features are detailed playbooks and player statistics and voice commentary in the style of a real NFL television broadcast. As of 2013 the franchise had generated over $4 billion in sales, making it one of the most profitable video game franchises on the market.

Electronic Arts (EA) founder Trip Hawkins conceived the series and approached Madden in 1984 for his endorsement and expertise. Because of Madden's insistence that the game be as realistic as possible, the first version of John Madden Football did not appear until 1988. EA has released annual versions since 1990 with the number used in each release generally representing the year after the game's release date; for example, Madden NFL 2005 was released in 2004, ahead of the 2004 NFL season.

== History ==
=== 1980s – Creation ===
The real reason that I founded Electronic Arts was because I wanted to make computerized versions of games like Strat-O-Matic.

— Trip Hawkins

Trip Hawkins created a clone of the Strat-O-Matic paper and dice-based football simulation game as a teenager. The game was unsuccessful due to its complexity, and he hoped to one day delegate its rules to a computer. At Harvard College, where Hawkins played football for the Crimson, he wrote a football simulation for the PDP-11 minicomputer which, he later said, predicted that the Miami Dolphins would defeat the Minnesota Vikings 23–6 (actually 24–7) in the 1974 Super Bowl. After founding Electronic Arts in 1982—"The real reason that I founded [it] was because I wanted to make computerized versions of games like Strat-O-Matic", Hawkins later said—the company began designing a microcomputer football game. Hawkins first approached his favorite player Joe Montana to endorse the proposed game but the quarterback already had an endorsement deal with Atari, Inc., and his second choice, Cal coach Joe Kapp, demanded up-front royalties far in excess of what Hawkins was willing to pay.

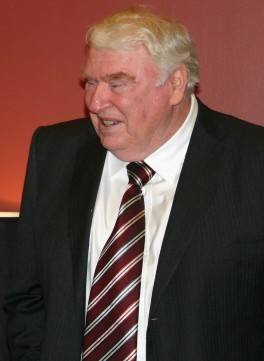
John Madden, a former NFL coach and then-announcer, agreed to lend his namesake and knowledge of football to the game series.

In 1984, Hawkins approached former NFL coach and then-announcer John Madden. Hawkins and game producer Joe Ybarra arranged a follow-up meeting with Madden during an Amtrak train trip over two days because of Madden's fear of flying. The EA executives promised that the proposed game would be a sophisticated football simulation and they asked the retired Oakland Raiders coach for his endorsement and expertise. Madden knew nothing about computers beyond his telestrator but agreed; he had taught a class at the University of California, Berkeley, called "Football for Fans", and envisioned the program as a tool for teaching and testing plays. (Madden would continue to see the game as an educational tool. When asked in 2012 to describe Madden NFL, he called it "a way for people to learn the game and participate in the game at a pretty sophisticated level".) Hawkins and Ybarra during the train trip learned football plays and strategies from Madden from sunrise to midnight.

Early plans envisioned six or seven players per team because of technical limitations but Madden insisted on having 11 players, stating "I'm not putting my name on it if it's not real". Ybarra, who had played chess, not football, in high school, became an expert on the subject through his work, but found that 11 players overwhelmed contemporary home computers. Most projects that are as delayed as Madden are canceled; Ybarra and developer Robin Antonick needed three years, more than twice the length of the average development process. The project became known within the company as "Trip's Folly", and Madden—who had received $100,000 advance against royalties that EA's outside auditors advised to write-off because it would never be recouped—believed at times that EA had given up.

The company hired Bethesda Softworks to finish the game, but this only got them partway to their goal. While EA used many of its designs, including contributions to their physics engine, within a year Bethesda stopped working on Madden and sued EA over EA's failure to publish new versions of Bethesda's Gridiron! football game. This added to the delay. After a final development push, John Madden Football debuted in 1988 for the Apple II computers. Hawkins and an exhausted Ybarra ("All my memories are of pain") could move on to other projects.

Contracted to provide plays, Madden gave EA the 1980 Raiders playbook, and EA hired San Francisco Examiner writer Frank Cooney, who had designed his own figurine football game with numerical skill ratings. Those skill ratings, also utilized in a spreadsheet based game called Grid Grade, were a precursor to player ratings in Madden Football. Although the company could not yet legally use NFL teams' or players' names, Cooney obtained real plays from NFL teams. The back of the box called the game "The First Real Football Simulation" and quoted Madden: "Hey, if there aren't 11 players, it isn't real football." Documentation included diagrams of dozens of offensive and defensive plays with Madden's commentary on coaching strategies and philosophy. In addition to submitting plays, Cooney worked with programmers and producers to create numerical ratings for every player so they would perform appropriately in the game, especially in man-to-man situations. In the beginning there were eight to 12 traits that were graded for each player. That number would grow to more than 200 as the game became more sophisticated. The game sold moderately well but given the sophisticated playbook its interface was complex, and Madden's insistence on 11 players caused the game to run slowly.

During this period, Madden turned down the opportunity to buy an "unlimited" number of options for EA stock in its initial public offering, a decision he later called "the dumbest thing I ever did in my life".

=== 1990s ===
In early 1990, EA hired Park Place Productions to develop Madden for the Sega Genesis video game console. Park Place had developed ABC Monday Night Football with "arcade-style, action-heavy" game play, and its Madden also emphasized hyperreality compared to the computer version's focus on exact simulation. Impressed with Park Place's work, EA chose it for the Genesis Madden instead of completing an in-house version by Antonick.

EA reverse engineered the console to sell the game without paying the standard $8 to $10 license fee per cartridge to Sega, then proposed a compromise of $2 per cartridge and a $2 million cap on the fee. The console maker agreed, afraid that EA would sell its reverse-engineered knowledge to other companies; the agreement saved EA $35 million over the next three years. As its own Joe Montana-endorsed football game would miss the 1990 Christmas shopping season, Sega asked EA to let it sell Madden with the Montana name. EA refused, but offered an inferior alternative that lacked Madden's 3D graphics and most of its 113 plays. Joe Montana Football sold well despite shipping after Christmas 1990, and it remained popular after BlueSky Software took over development. John Madden Football for the Genesis, however, became both the first hugely successful Madden game—selling 400,000 copies when the company expected 75,000—and the first killer app for EA and Sega, helping the console gain market share against the Super NES. From 1992 to 1994, Mega placed the game at #1 in their monthly Top 100 Mega Drive Games of All Time.

In 1990, EA producer Richard Hilleman brought in veteran sports game designer Scott Orr, who had founded the mid-1980s Commodore 64 game publisher GameStar and led the design of their best-selling sports games. The team of Orr and Hilleman designed and led the development of what is today still recognizable as the modern Madden. Early versions of Madden were created by external development studios such as Bethesda, Visual Concepts, and Stormfront Studios. John Madden Football '92 also featured the ambulance which would run over any players in its path.

After Visual Concepts failed to deliver Madden NFL '96 for the new PlayStation in 1995, EA hired Tiburon Entertainment for Madden NFL '97 and later acquired the company, centralizing development in-house. It planned to release John Madden Football as its first sports-based arcade game, but the game was cancelled due to unenthusiastic reactions from play testers. EA's refusal to release Madden and other sports titles for the Dreamcast in 1999 contributed to the console's lack of success and Sega's exit from the hardware market.

By 1996, Madden was the best-selling sports video game franchise, with more than eight million units sold up until then.

==== Franchise Mode ====
Madden NFL '99 was the first game in the series to include Franchise Mode, giving players the ability to play multiple seasons, make off-season draft picks, and trade players. Within Franchise Mode, players take on the role of general manager and manage all personnel matters, including contracts, free agency, draft picks, and hiring and firing coaches. The player also acts as a head coach-like character (although there is a head coach figure in-game), choosing which players to play, making substitutions, running practices, practicing gameplans, etc.

Players may play with any of the NFL's 32 franchises; they can choose whether or not to have trade deadlines and salary caps and if they want to start their franchise with a 49-round fantasy draft of all active NFL players. Players can also upload created teams for use in the game.

Once in game, players run training camp (individual drills for improving players' attributes), play in preseason games and compete in a regular 16-game NFL season, including playoffs and the Super Bowl. The player has the option to play any game in the simulation, including those involving other teams if they so desire, or may simulate through the games as they choose. Most versions of Madden give a player 30 years with their franchise, sometimes with an opportunity to apply for the Hall of Fame at the end of the simulation.

Throughout the history of Franchise Mode, there have been many issues and glitches including data corruption, gameplay bugs, and developer mistakes. Franchise Mode is one of Madden's most consistently criticized game modes each year.

=== 2000s ===
==== Madden NFL 2000 ====
Madden NFL 2000 was the first Madden to have a play editor, arcade mode, and the Madden Challenge. The game was released on August 31, 1999, for Microsoft Windows, PlayStation, Game Boy, Nintendo 64, and Classic Mac OS. The cover athletes were former Raiders Coach John Madden and the Detroit Lions running back Barry Sanders in the background. This was the second Madden to have someone besides John Madden on the cover.

==== Madden NFL 2001 ====
Madden NFL 2001 featured a segment called "Great Games" where one would be put in a situation where they control one team and would have to win the game with a set amount of time. If the player wins, they unlock either a new team or a stadium. Overall, there were more than 60 teams and over 80 stadiums in Madden NFL 2001. Tennessee Titans running back Eddie George is the cover athlete.

==== Madden NFL 2002 ====
Madden NFL 2002 featured for the first time Create-A-Team where one would make a team and play with that team in either Play Now or Franchise mode. It also featured Create-A-League mode but it never caught on. Create-A-Team was not featured in Madden NFL 13 and moving teams was first featured in Madden NFL 2004 called "Stadium" in the Franchise mode of the game. Madden NFL 2002 was the 2nd highest selling game in 2002. Minnesota Vikings quarterback Daunte Culpepper is the cover athlete.

==== Madden NFL 2003 ====
There are multiple modes of game play, from a quick head-to-head game to running a team for a whole season or even multiple seasons. Online play, which was a new feature for Madden NFL 2003 (in this version there are also mini-camp challenges) was only available for users of the PlayStation 2 console, Xbox console, or a Microsoft Windows PC until early 2004. St. Louis Rams running back Marshall Faulk is the cover athlete.

==== Madden NFL 2004 ====
Also, starting with Madden NFL 2004, EA Sports created the new Playmaker tool, using the right analog joystick found on each of the adjustments previously unavailable in prior installments of the franchise. One such adjustment includes the ability to switch which direction a running play was going without changing the formation. Prior to the Playmaker tool, the Player could only call one of four available "hot routes." With Playmaker and the use of the right thumb stick, the player is given 4 additional Hot Route options. When the quarterback has the ball the Playmaker Tool can be used to make receivers alter their routes mid-play. When running the ball on offense, the runner can control the direction in which the blocker is going. Defensive alignment adjustments, however, were not available leading to obvious imbalance in favor of the Offensive player. Atlanta Falcons quarterback Michael Vick is the cover athlete.

==== Madden NFL 2005 ====
In Madden NFL 2005, EA Sports ran a campaign with the Theme "Fear the D" emphasising their improvements on the "other side of the ball." In an attempt to re-balance the players experience, EA gave a Playmaker Tool to the defense. Similar to the offensive Playmaker Tool, the defensive Playmaker allows the player to make pre-snap defensive adjustments. EA Sports further utilized the right analog joystick on defense by creating the "Hit Stick", an option on defense that allows the controlled player to make big hits, with a simple flick, that increases the chances the ball carrier will fumble. Also introduced for the first time is the "Formation Shift." This new feature allowed players to shift their formation in the pre-snap audible menu without actually changing the play. For example, if you call a run play up the middle out of a goal line formation, you could then call a formation shift and make your players spread out into a four wide receiver formation while still in the same running play. The problem with this new function was that EA also added a fatigue penalty for the defense causing defensive players to get more tired each time there was a formation shift. This led to players on offense calling multiple formation shifts each play making the defensive players too exhausted to keep up and force them to substitute out of the game until they are fully rested. This led to more imbalance that could only be fixed by turning off fatigue. Baltimore Ravens linebacker Ray Lewis is the cover athlete.

2005 also added "EA Sports Radio", a fictional show that plays during the menu screen of Franchise mode to provide a greater sense of a storyline during gameplay. It features Tony Bruno as the host, who often interviews players and coaches about how the season is going and also has quiz questions in which fake listeners call in to make attempts at answering football-related questions. It included mock interviews of famous NFL players and coaches throughout the in-game season. Some fans have criticized EA Sports for not including new features to the 'programming' as the radio became stale after only two seasons in franchise mode, but the feature drew acclaim for adding content to the Franchise menu. Also added was the Newspaper where the player could look at National News from licensed USA Today and Licensed Local papers for almost each of the 32 NFL teams. Lastly, 2005 also saw the introduction of multiple progressions during franchise mode. Previously NFL players in Madden would only progress or regress at the end of each season. Now at the end of Week 5, 11, and 17 the game would use a program to "progress" players based on their performance in addition to end of season progression.

==== Madden NFL 06 ====
In Madden NFL 06, the "Truck Stick" was introduced. This feature allows the offensive player to lower his shoulder and break a tackle, or back juke to avoid one. Another new feature is the Superstar Mode, which allows the player to take control of a rookie and progress through his career. This includes an IQ test, interviews, workouts, the NFL Draft, hiring an agent, and other aspects of a superstar's life. Philadelphia Eagles quarterback Donovan McNabb is the cover athlete.

EA also introduced the QB Vision feature in the 2006 installment. With this feature, a cone of spotlight emits from the quarterback during passing plays, simulating his field of vision. To make an accurate pass, the quarterback must have his intended receiver in his field of vision. Passing to a receiver not in the cone reduces pass accuracy significantly. The size of the quarterback's vision cone is directly correlated to his Awareness and Passer Accuracy rating; Brett Favre and Peyton Manning see nearly the entire field at once, whereas an inexperienced quarterback such as J. P. Losman or Kyle Boller sees only a sliver of the field. This feature also allows for bigger plays and more interceptions.

Also, EA sports added the Smart Route. This means that when pressing a hot route to the corresponding receiver, you put the analog stick down and the receiver will run to the first down, and you can throw him the ball.

While current gen Madden remained the same with the exception of a "Smart Route" and "QB Vision", this was also the first year Madden was released on the next-gen Xbox 360. It was completely stripped down, almost every change made in the previous gen was wiped away.

EA also added the ask Madden feature during this time. Allowing you to talk to him and use his expertise to help win.

==== EA Sports Madden NFL Football ====
This is an arcade game developed by Global VR and released in 2005. The game comes in standard and deluxe cabinets. It can be played with up to four players and includes five game modes: Exhibition, Training, Tournament, Competition, and Career. It features rosters from the 2004–2005 season.

==== Madden NFL 07 ====
In Madden NFL 07, EA introduced Lead Blocker Controls which allow users to control blockers during running plays. In addition, EA redefined the Truck Stick into the Highlight Stick. With the Highlight Stick, users can have their running backs perform different running moves and combos, instead of just bowling over defenders. Truck Stick features still exist for bigger backs, but not for smaller backs who would never realistically use them anyway. Instead, more agile backs perform acrobatic ducks and dodges to avoid tackles. Seattle Seahawks running back Shaun Alexander is the cover athlete.

==== EA Sports Madden NFL Football: Season 2 ====
This game is the sequel to EA Sports Madden NFL Football. Like the original, it was also developed by Global VR. It was released in 2006 only in arcades. This version adds QB Vision, the Hit Stick, and the Truck Stick. The rosters are also updated for the 2006–2007 season.

==== Madden NFL 08 ====
In Madden NFL 08, the Weapons feature was added, allowing superstar players to be noticed. Randy Moss, for example, is a Go-To-Guy, allowing him to make amazing one-handed grabs. It also includes new skill drills, Hit Stick 2.0, and Ring of a Champion features. Tennessee Titans quarterback Vince Young is on the cover. Madden NFL 08 was also the last Madden game released for macOS and the last GameCube game ever released. It was also the last to appear on Windows until Madden NFL 19 in 2018.

==== Madden NFL 09 ====
Madden NFL 09 was released on August 12, 2008. Citing business concerns, EA chose not to release the game on PC platforms. The game features quarterback Brett Favre on the front cover, initially in a Green Bay Packers uniform, but also with a downloadable cover featuring Favre in a New York Jets uniform. Favre had retired before the start of the season as a member of the Packers, but came out of retirement late in the summer and was traded to the Jets. Madden NFL 09 was the first of the series to offer online, league game play, allowing up to 32 players to compete in an online, simulated NFL season. EA Sports Senior Producer Phil Frazier, up to 32 players were able to participate in competitive games, the NFL Draft and conduct trades between their teams. The game was also the first of the series to incorporate a Madden IQ. The Madden IQ is used to automatically gauge your skills through a series of mini-games consisting of run offense, pass offense, run defense, and pass defense. At the end of each of the drills, the player receives a score ranging from rookie to all-Madden. The final Madden IQ is a mixture of those scores which is used to control the game's difficulty.

==== Madden NFL 10 ====
Madden NFL 10 was released on August 14, 2009. It features Arizona Cardinals wide receiver Larry Fitzgerald and Pittsburgh Steelers strong safety Troy Polamalu. Compared to previous iterations, Madden NFL 10 has been extremely transparent with its development efforts, maintaining a weekly blog updates as well as a constant presence on various message boards. A new design team has also taken over the game, including members from NFL Head Coach 09. The direction of Madden NFL 10 has been shifted to much more of a realistic and simulation focus, with info already released including Procedural Awareness (a robust head tracking system), a new philosophy on player ratings, and big improvements to realism in QB play, WR/DB play, and other areas across the game. Madden 10 has several new features including the PRO-TAK animation technology, which allows up to nine man gang tackles and fumble pile-ups to help players 'fight for every yard', in this year's tagline. Madden 10 also features an in-game weekly recap show called The Extra Point. Madden 10 offers a series of multiple play packages. This allows for more options to score. This version features a completely overhauled rating system for players, featuring new categories such as throw on the run and specific ratings for short, medium, and deep passes. The game's soundtrack features rap, alternative rock, rap metal and hard rock bands such as Nirvana, Pantera, System of a Down, and Kid Rock.

=== 2010s ===
==== Madden NFL 11 ====
Madden NFL 11 was released on July 27, 2010 (moved up from its original release date of August 10, 2010 for promotional reasons), and features New Orleans Saints quarterback Drew Brees on the cover. It features several new additions to the franchise, such as Online Team Play, Online Scouting and online attribute boosts for co-op play. Along with these new game additions is a new rating (sponsored by Old Spice) known as Swagger. Although early speculation was that this new rating would be reflective of "confidence" or "composure," it was quickly confirmed to be directly tied to a player's personality for celebrations.

==== Madden NFL 12 ====
Madden NFL 12 was released on August 25, 2011. The release was delayed by two weeks due to the NFL lockout, and features Cleveland Browns running back Peyton Hillis on the cover. However, there is a limited edition in which the cover features St. Louis Rams running back Marshall Faulk.

==== Madden NFL 13 ====
Madden NFL 13 was released on August 28, 2012, and features Detroit Lions wide receiver Calvin Johnson as the cover athlete. Madden NFL 13 is the first & only Madden game to be released on the PlayStation Vita, and it is also the first game in the series to have Kinect support as well as a new physics engine promoting real in game physics.

Madden NFL 13 included a complete revamp to online franchise mode which became known as Connected Careers Mode (CCM). Some of the new CCM features included player contracts, the ability to trade draft picks, a salary cap, and up to 30 seasons worth of gameplay.

==== Madden NFL 25 ====
In early 2013, EA Sports announced that the next installment of the Madden series would be released on August 27, 2013. As this installment is the 25th anniversary of the series, the game is called Madden NFL 25, instead of Madden NFL 14 with the year like the previous versions. The cover vote consisted of two brackets containing past players ("Old School") and active players ("New School").

"Old School" player and Pro Football Hall of Famer Barry Sanders was chosen as the cover athlete for Madden NFL 25 on the April 24, 2013, episode of ESPN's SportsNation. The "New School" finalist was Adrian Peterson.

==== Madden NFL 15 ====
On March 13, 2014 EA Sports posted on its website that user would be able to design and submit uniforms for Connected Careers by March 17, 2014, for "the next Madden NFL." On April 28, 2014, EA announced the release of Madden 15 pre-ordering in a release video with NFL linebacker and 2013 Defensive Player of the Year Luke Kuechly. The game was released August 26 in North America and on August 29 in the EU for Xbox One, PlayStation 4, Xbox 360 and the PlayStation 3. The game featured "dramatic all-new camera angles, as well as dynamic pre-game and halftime features." During the Detroit Lions 10th pick of the 2014 NFL draft, Barry Sanders announced fans again would be able to vote for the cover athlete. On June 6, Seattle Seahawks cornerback Richard Sherman was announced as the cover athlete.

==== Madden NFL 16 ====
EA decided not to have players vote for the cover athlete through a traditional bracket, but rather through collectible cards in Madden NFL Mobile, or through Ultimate Team on the console devices. On May 4, 2015, the four finalists were announced for the 2016 game cover: New England Patriots tight end Rob Gronkowski, Arizona Cardinals cornerback Patrick Peterson, New York Giants wide receiver Odell Beckham Jr. and Pittsburgh Steelers wide receiver Antonio Brown. On May 13, Beckham Jr. beat out Gronkowski in a fan vote for the cover of Madden 16. It was released on August 25, 2015.

==== Madden NFL 17 ====
Madden NFL 17 was released on August 23, 2016. The features in the game include an upgrade of the Ground Game, a redesigned and better Franchise Mode, "Madden 365", new Ball Carrier UI Prompts, the new Path Assist and more. New England Patriots tight end Rob Gronkowski serves as the cover athlete.

==== Madden NFL 18 ====
Madden NFL 18 was released on August 25, 2017. The game is the first in the series to be developed in the Frostbite Engine, and it incorporates a story mode titled Longshot Mode, akin to The Journey in FIFA 17. It was announced that New England Patriots quarterback Tom Brady would be on the cover, marking the second consecutive year where a Patriot will be on the cover. Furthermore, an enhanced G.O.A.T. edition was also announced.

==== Madden NFL 19 ====
Madden NFL 19 was announced with Pittsburgh Steelers wide receiver Antonio Brown as the cover athlete. It was released on August 10, 2018. This is the first entry since Madden NFL 08 in 2007 to receive a Windows release.

==== Madden NFL 20 ====
Madden NFL 20 was announced with Kansas City Chiefs quarterback Patrick Mahomes as the cover athlete. It was released on August 2, 2019. This game features an online eliminator mode called Superstar K.O., as well as a revamped story mode titled Face of the Franchise: QB1.

=== 2020s ===
==== Madden NFL 21 ====
Madden NFL 21 was announced with Baltimore Ravens quarterback Lamar Jackson as the cover athlete. It was released on August 28, 2020. Introduced that year was a new, backyard-football inspired online mode called The Yard, similar to NBA 2k's MyPark.

Due to the Washington Redskins announcing the retirement of the team's controversial moniker on July 13, 2020, EA announced on July 17 that it would be doing an update on Madden NFL 21 to remove the team's logo and name and replacing them with a generic Washington logo and name pending further developments.

==== Madden NFL 22 ====
Madden NFL 22 was announced with both Tampa Bay Buccaneers quarterback Tom Brady and Kansas City Chiefs quarterback Patrick Mahomes as the cover athletes. It was the second cover appearance for both players.

==== Madden NFL 23 ====
Madden NFL 23 was announced with head coach John Madden as the cover star on Madden Day (June 1, 2022, the same day the series' first installment, John Madden Football, was released) in honor of his death on December 28, 2021. The cover of the next gen version is a picture of Madden celebrating his victory as the head coach of the Oakland Raiders at Super Bowl XI. The All Madden Edition is based on the cover of the series' 1st installment, John Madden Football, made by Chuck Styles.

==== Madden NFL 24 ====
Madden NFL 24 was announced with Buffalo Bills quarterback Josh Allen as the cover athlete.

==== Madden NFL 25 ====
Madden NFL 25 was released in early September 2024, with San Francisco 49ers running back Christian McCaffrey as the cover athlete. It is the last entry to be released on PlayStation 4 and Xbox One.

==== Madden NFL 26 ====
Madden NFL 26 was announced in April 2025 and released on August 14, 2025, with Philadelphia Eagles running back Saquon Barkley as the cover athlete. With a simultaneous launch on Nintendo Switch 2, it is the first Madden entry to be released on a Nintendo console since Madden NFL 13 on Wii U. It is also the first entry to exclusively launch on ninth-generation home consoles. Madden NFL 26 is also the first entry in the series to recognize long snapper as a distinct position.

=== License history and spinoffs ===
==== Licensing ====
Until 1993, the Madden series did not have official licenses from the National Football League (NFL) or National Football League Players Association (NFLPA). Madden NFL '94 was the first game in the series to include real NFL teams, and Madden NFL '95 added an NFLPA license for real players through the National Football League Players Incorporated (NFLPI). The licenses restrict EA from including certain content in current Madden games, such as the humorous ambulance that picks up injured players in 1991's John Madden Football II. The NFL Coaches Association sold the rights to have NFL coaches' names appear in the Madden NFL games; Madden NFL 2001 was the first game in the series to feature this license. Neither New England Patriots coach Bill Belichick nor Bill Parcells appeared in the game as they are not members of the NFL Coaches Association. Likewise, non-NFLPA players (such as Thurman Thomas during his playing career) do not appear in the game, instead being replaced with generic placeholders.

==== Exclusivity ====
In 2004, EA signed an exclusive licensing rights agreement through 2009 with the NFL and the NFLPA to give the company the exclusive rights to use the NFL's teams, stadiums, and players in a video game. Mike Mika, who was working on NFL 2K, described the agreement as "like a nuclear bomb going off in the game industry", canceling rival NFL projects. This exclusive license prevents other rival video game developers from producing official NFL video games. The deal, reportedly worth $300 million and later extended to 2013, has been widely criticized. Some competitors, such as the Blitz: The League series, have elected to continue, seeking to distinguish themselves through innovative gameplay while others, such as the NFL 2K series, have ceased production. In 2007, 2K Sports released All Pro Football 2K8, which used former NFL stars.

In 2020 2K gained the rights for "non-simulation football game experiences" from the NFL. The deal is said to not impact Madden which will remain the only "simulation" football game.

In 2020 the NFL extended its exclusive rights with EA which were due to expire in 2022, which changed to until 2026 for a reported $1.5 billion, with a provision for an additional year of exclusivity if EA hits revenue targets.

==== Head Coach series ====
In August 2006, EA Sports debuted NFL Head Coach, which utilized the Madden engine to create a football management simulation. The game was criticized as buggy and unrealistic. EA Tiburon rebuilt the game from the ground up, addressing flaws and creating a proprietary engine, over the course of three years. NFL Head Coach 09 was released on August 12, 2008, bundled with the special edition of Madden NFL 09 and as a standalone game on September 2, 2008.

==== Madden NFL Social ====
Madden NFL Social was an early version of Madden NFL Mobile for Facebook and iOS that was released November 1, 2012 and shut down September 2, 2013.

==== Madden Arcade ====
Released on November 24, 2009, the game is 5-on-5 and takes the best 10 players from each of the 32 NFL teams.

==== Madden NFL Mobile ====
Madden NFL Mobile was released on August 26, 2014, and is only the third Madden game on mobile devices. The game is very similar to the Madden Ultimate Team (MUT) game mode, and the game is currently on its 9th season.

==== Madden NFL Football ====
Madden NFL Football was released as a launch title for the Nintendo 3DS on March 27, 2011.

=== Voice commentary ===
Voice commentary in Madden allows players or watchers to hear the game being called as if it were a real game on TV. For early versions of the game, this commentary was performed by Madden himself and his play-by-play partner. Initially, this was Pat Summerall, his partner during their days at CBS and Fox from the early 1980s to the early 2000s until Summerall retired; the role was then filled by Al Michaels, John's broadcast partner on Monday Night Football (2002–2005) and NBC Sunday Night Football (2006–2008). For the first Madden games on the Xbox 360 and PS3, they featured a generic EA Sports radio announcer doing play-by-play. This started with Madden 06 and ended with Madden 08. Other versions of those games still featured Madden's commentary.

Madden recorded thousands of lines for each Madden game. Madden NFL 09 was the last version to feature Madden's commentary, albeit in a reduced role. By that time, he felt that reciting a script covering every single scenario in the game was boring and tedious—Madden recalled the long hours spent alone in the recording studio as "the most difficult part of any part that I've ever had in the game and the least amount of fun"—but said that in the decision to remove him from game commentary, "I feel that something is being taken away from me".

Madden and Michaels were replaced by Cris Collinsworth as color commentator and Tom Hammond on play-by-play in Madden NFL 09 and Madden NFL 10. Gus Johnson replaced Hammond in Madden NFL 11 and Madden NFL 12, with Collinsworth handling color commentary in both games. Madden NFL 13 marked the debut of real-life announcing team Jim Nantz and Phil Simms, including them appearing in an in-booth cutscene before the game. Nantz and Simms stayed until Madden NFL 16, when they were replaced by Fox's Brandon Gaudin and Charles Davis for Madden NFL 17. Nantz continued to work as the primary play-by-play announcer for CBS, while Simms later left the CBS broadcast booth to work on The NFL Today. Gaudin and Davis returned to the studio throughout the 2016 NFL season to add new commentary relevant to each week of the season.

New commentary teams were added to Madden NFL 25. In addition to Gaudin and Davis, NBC's Mike Tirico and Fox's #2 analyst Greg Olsen formed one new broadcast team, while Kate Scott, the voice of the Philadelphia 76ers and Seattle Seahawks preseason games, and Fox's #2 college football analyst Brock Huard formed another team.

In addition, Madden NFL 08 and Madden NFL 09 were also released in Spanish, featuring ESPN Deportes announcer Álvaro Martín providing both play-by-play and analysis.

== Games list ==
Titles in the series
Title	Release	Platforms	On the cover
John Madden Football	1988	MS-DOS, C64/C128, Apple II	John Madden
John Madden Football	1990	Genesis	John Madden
John Madden Football II	1991	MS-DOS	John Madden
John Madden Football '92	1991	Genesis	John Madden
John Madden Football	1991	SNES	John Madden
John Madden Football '93	1992	Genesis, SNES	John Madden
John Madden Football	1992	Amiga	John Madden
John Madden Duo CD Football	1993	TG16 (Super CD)	John Madden
Madden NFL '94	1993	Genesis, SNES	John Madden
John Madden Football	1994	3DO	John Madden; Ricky Watters of the San Francisco 49ers (PAL version)
Madden NFL '95	1994	Genesis, SNES, Game Boy, Game Gear, TV game	John Madden with Erik Williams of the Dallas Cowboys and Karl Wilson of the San Francisco 49ers in the background
Madden NFL '96	1995	Windows, Genesis, SNES, Game Boy, Game Gear	John Madden with Cary Brabham of the Carolina Panthers and Gordon Laro of the Jacksonville Jaguars in the background
Madden NFL 97	1996	Windows, Genesis, SNES, PS1, Saturn, Game Boy	John Madden
Madden NFL 98	1997	Windows, Genesis, SNES, PS1, Saturn	John Madden
Madden Football 64	1997	N64	John Madden
Madden NFL 99	1998	Windows, PS1, N64	John Madden; Garrison Hearst of the San Francisco 49ers (PAL version)
Madden NFL 2000	1999	Windows, PS1, N64, Game Boy Color, Macintosh	John Madden with Barry Sanders of the Detroit Lions in the background / Dorsey Levens of the Green Bay Packers (European PAL version)
Madden NFL 2001	2000	Windows, PS1, N64, Game Boy Color, PS2	Eddie George of the Tennessee Titans
Madden NFL 2002	2001	Windows, PS1, N64, PS2, GameCube, Xbox, Game Boy Color, Game Boy Advance	Daunte Culpepper of the Minnesota Vikings
Madden NFL 2003	2002	Windows, PS1, PS2, GameCube, Xbox, Game Boy Advance	Marshall Faulk of the St. Louis Rams
Madden NFL 2004	2003	Windows, PS1, PS2, GameCube, Xbox, Game Boy Advance	Michael Vick of the Atlanta Falcons
Madden NFL 2005	2004	Windows, PS1, PS2, GameCube, Xbox, Game Boy Advance, Nintendo DS, Tapwave Zodiac	Ray Lewis of the Baltimore Ravens
Madden NFL 06	2005	Windows, PS2, GameCube, Xbox, Xbox 360, Game Boy Advance, Nintendo DS, PSP, Windows Mobile, Mobile phone	Donovan McNabb of the Philadelphia Eagles
EA Sports Madden NFL Football	2005	Arcade	
Madden NFL 07	2006	Windows, Mobile phone, PS2, GameCube, Xbox, Xbox 360, PS3, Wii, Game Boy Advance, Nintendo DS, PSP	Shaun Alexander of the Seattle Seahawks; John Madden (Hall of Fame Edition)
EA Sports Madden NFL Football: Season 2	2006	Arcade	N/A
Madden NFL 08	2007	Windows, PS2, GameCube, Xbox, Xbox 360, PS3, Wii, Nintendo DS, PSP, Mac OS X	Vince Young of the Tennessee Titans; Luis Castillo of the San Diego Chargers (Spanish language version)
Madden NFL 09	2008	PS2, Xbox, Xbox 360, PS3, Wii, Nintendo DS, PSP	Brett Favre of the Green Bay Packers/New York Jets (alternative cover) (Note: The cover was initially launched with the recently-retired Favre in a Green Bay Packers uniform. After production began, Favre came out of retirement and was traded to the New York Jets. A downloadable version of the cover with Favre in a Jets uniform was made available on EA Sports' website.); Roberto Garza of the Chicago Bears (Spanish language version)
Madden NFL 10	2009	PS2, Xbox 360, PS3, Wii, PSP, iOS	Troy Polamalu of the Pittsburgh Steelers; Larry Fitzgerald of the Arizona Cardinals
Madden NFL 11	2010	PS2, Xbox 360, PS3, Wii, PSP, iOS	Drew Brees of the New Orleans Saints
Madden NFL Football	2011	Nintendo 3DS	N/A
Madden NFL 12	2011	PS2, Xbox 360, PS3, Wii, PSP, iOS, Android, BlackBerry Playbook	Peyton Hillis of the Cleveland Browns
Madden NFL 13	2012	Xbox 360, PS3, Wii, Wii U, PS Vita, iOS	Calvin Johnson of the Detroit Lions
Madden NFL 25	2013	Xbox 360, PS3, Xbox One, PS4, iOS, Android	Barry Sanders of the Detroit Lions (Xbox 360 and PS3); Adrian Peterson of the Minnesota Vikings (Xbox One and PS4)
Madden NFL 15	2014	Xbox 360, PS3, Xbox One, PS4	Richard Sherman of the Seattle Seahawks
Madden NFL Mobile	2014	iOS, Android	Same as the console for each year
Madden NFL 16	2015	Xbox 360, PS3, Xbox One, PS4	Odell Beckham Jr. of the New York Giants
Madden NFL 17	2016	Xbox 360, PS3, Xbox One, PS4	Rob Gronkowski of the New England Patriots
Madden NFL 18	2017	Xbox One, PS4	Tom Brady of the New England Patriots
Madden NFL 19	2018	Windows, Xbox One, PS4	Antonio Brown of the Pittsburgh Steelers; Terrell Owens of the Dallas Cowboys (Hall of Fame Edition)
Madden NFL 20	2019	Windows, Xbox One, PS4	Patrick Mahomes of the Kansas City Chiefs
Madden NFL 21	2020	Windows, Xbox One, PS4, Xbox Series X/S, PS5, Stadia	Lamar Jackson of the Baltimore Ravens
Madden NFL 22	2021	Windows, Xbox One, PS4, Xbox Series X/S, PS5, Stadia	Tom Brady of the Tampa Bay Buccaneers; Patrick Mahomes of the Kansas City Chiefs
Madden NFL 23	2022	Windows, Xbox One, PS4, Xbox Series X/S, PS5	John Madden (Note: The cover of the next gen version is a picture of Madden celebrating his victory as the head coach of the Oakland Raiders at Super Bowl XI, while the cover of the All Madden Edition is based on the cover of John Madden Football, made by Chuck Styles.)
Madden NFL 24	2023	Windows, Xbox One, PS4, Xbox Series X/S, PS5	Josh Allen of the Buffalo Bills
Madden NFL 25	2024	Windows, Xbox One, PS4, Xbox Series X/S, PS5	Christian McCaffrey of the San Francisco 49ers
Madden NFL 26	2025	Windows, Xbox Series X/S, PS5, Nintendo Switch 2	Saquon Barkley of the Philadelphia Eagles
Madden NFL 27	2026	Windows, Xbox Series X/S, PS5, Nintendo Switch 2	Caleb Williams of the Chicago Bears

== Reception and legacy ==
Madden recalls a time in San Francisco when a Philadelphia Eagles player rushed into a hotel room asking, 'Where's Madden?' When people pointed to the Fox commentator, the player said, 'No, not that Madden. I want the game!'

— Los Angeles Times, 2002

As of 2021, the Madden NFL franchise has sold over 150 million units worldwide. By 2013, Electronic Arts had sold more than 100 million copies, including over five million in one year, for more than $4 billion in total sales revenue. At EA Tiburon in Orlando, Florida a team of 30 developers and more than 100 game testers works on each new game in the series, which as of 2012 contains more than 10 million lines of source code.

Madden, once better known for Ace Hardware commercials than football despite winning Super Bowl XI as the head coach for the Oakland Raiders, became better known for Madden NFL than as coach or broadcaster. He received an estimated $2 to 3 million each year for his endorsement but described himself as "never a good player" of Madden and preferred to watch others play. Although Madden said that "a computer is a helluva lot smarter than me" he influenced the series' design from the first game, and from his 2009 retirement until his death, his participation in each Madden's development increased:

He breaks down upcoming rules changes. He brings up concussions, helmet-to-helmet hits and gimmick quarterbacks. A digression on how the Dome Patrol-era Saints used to frustrate Bill Walsh's 49ers teams with short linebacker drops becomes a lecture on the obsolescence of the fullback, which then morphs into a short aside on player character.

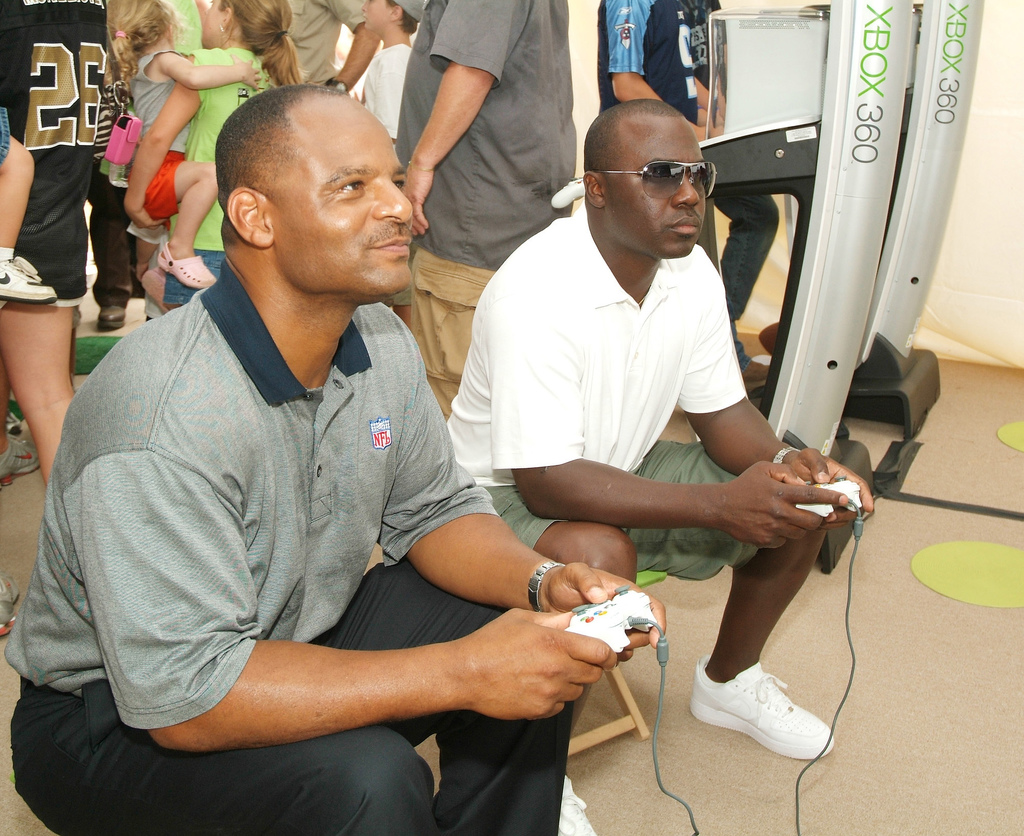
Former NFL players Warren Moon and Marshall Faulk playing Madden NFL 07

EA estimates that the series has five to seven million dedicated fans, and an underground circuit of Madden cash tournaments exists. Marshall Faulk in 2010 estimated that "50 percent on up" of NFL players are Madden players, who play in the league with or against childhood heroes they once chose to play as in the game. Players typically play as themselves regardless of their electronic counterparts' abilities and immediately check new releases of the game for changes in the more than 60 ratings of their talent. They often complain to Madden and EA about allegedly inaccurate ratings (only Emmitt Smith has told him that the game rated him too high), or ask for changes in their in-game appearance. Such complaints began as early as 1990, confusing the broadcaster, who did not contribute the player statistics for that year's version due to lack of time.

Coaches and players at all levels of the sport such as K. J. Wright and Joe Brady say that Madden has influenced them and recommend the game to learn football strategy and tactics, practice plays and assignments, and simulate opponents. Teddy Bridgewater, who has used Madden to practice plays since college at Louisville, created Brady's playbook in the game to help his backups P. J. Walker and Will Grier. Young players who grew up with Madden reportedly understand plays better than those who did not. Wired in 2010 wrote that the growing use of rookie quarterbacks and the spread offense was influenced by the game, stating that "the sport is being taken over by something you might call Maddenball — a sophisticated, high-scoring, pass-happy, youth-driven phenomenon". When the Denver Broncos' Brandon Stokley in 2009 burned six seconds of the clock with an unusual run before scoring the winning touchdown against the Cincinnati Bengals, Madden designers—who were watching the game with Madden—immediately recognized his action as "what happens in the game!"

Football broadcasts on television use Madden-like visual cues to more closely resemble it, and the NFL considers the series its "33rd franchise" because each week during the season EA Sports receives the same searchable film database of every play that each of the league's 32 teams do. The game is the NFL's second-largest source of licensing revenue, after apparel, and an important part of the league's recruitment of children as new football fans

The Pro Football Hall of Fame in 2003 opened an interactive exhibit in which visitors play Madden, three years before its namesake's induction. Museum of the Moving Image in New York City in early 2014 celebrated Madden NFL's 25th anniversary, with an exhibit including five playable versions of the game.

In 1996, Next Generation listed the Genesis installments of the series collectively as number 30 on their "Top 100 Games of All Time", calling them "One of the best two-player games of all time, the game that reinvented EA, and, (along with Sonic the Hedgehog), the game that launched Sega's 16-bit assault on Nintendo."

During the mid-1990s, the series came under increasing criticism for its exploitable AI in single-player mode, as certain plays would consistently trounce AI-controlled teams, and came to be regarded as primarily a multiplayer experience.

Since Madden NFL 06 on the seventh generation of consoles, Electronic Arts has received criticism for not evolving the Madden games for next generation consoles, while graphics have certainly improved, certain popular features from older games in the series have been removed for unknown reasons, then some come back in newer iterations slightly altered and advertised as a new feature. Many glitches and poor balancing of the meta have been seen in the games and some gamers and reviewers think there has been little to no improvement with recent iterations of Madden. The most notable bugs affecting the community have been extensive issues with franchise mode, commentary hiccups, gameplay/physics issues, and disconnection/loss of progress problems. Some reviews of recent Madden games have criticized the series for not evolving and not making changes to the series and saying older iterations of the series are better games. EA has also received criticism for not improving Franchise Mode, which was one of its flagship modes and instead only focusing on Ultimate Team, its team-building card game mode introduced in Madden NFL 10 which gradually started to get monetized throughout the 2010s. The trailer release for Madden NFL 21 on June 17, 2020, was widely panned by gamers and reviewers as seen in its like-to-dislike ratio and its user review score on Metacritic are at an all-time low, sitting at 0.2 as of January 2021.

== Curse ==
Prior to 1998, every annual installment of the Madden NFL series primarily featured Madden on its cover. In 1998, Electronic Arts selected Garrison Hearst to appear on the PAL version's cover, although Madden remained on the North American release. Beginning with Eddie George in 2000, the series has usually featured one of the league's top players on every annual installment, despite Madden's opposition. While appearing on the cover has become an honor akin to appearing on the Wheaties box, much like the Sports Illustrated Cover Jinx, certain players who appeared on Madden video game box art have experienced a decline in performance or an injury. This run of misfortune for Madden cover athletes has been dubbed the "Madden curse".

When asked about the Madden Curse, EA Sports' Chris Erb said, "I don't know that we believe in the curse. The players don't believe in the curse." Running back Shaun Alexander, who was featured on the cover of Madden NFL 07, commented, "Do you want to be hurt and on the cover, or just hurt?" and Madden NFL 08 cover athlete Vince Young expressed skepticism, while Madden NFL 12 cover athlete Peyton Hillis attributed his subpar season to the curse.

The perception that the curse is real has resulted in fans lobbying for their favorite players not to be on the cover, such as fans of LaDainian Tomlinson who were strongly opposed to EA Sports' initial decision to feature him on the cover of Madden NFL 08, so much that a fan created SaveLTfromMadden.com to voice their disdain. Tomlinson declined the offer, but later said it was solely due to contract negotiations. Starting with Madden NFL 11 EA has allowed fans to choose their favorite player for the cover. However, EA believes that many fans vote against their favorite player to avoid the "curse". It has become so prominent that bookmakers create odds on how likely an injury will occur to the player appearing on the cover.

The injuries that Madden cover athletes experience can be attributed to the physical nature of football. Critics of the curse also note several players had successful seasons when they appeared on the cover, such as Madden NFL 13's Calvin Johnson, who set the single-season record for receiving yards, Madden NFL 18's Tom Brady, who was named MVP, and Madden NFL 20's Patrick Mahomes, who won Super Bowl LIV and was named Super Bowl MVP.

In December 2010, EA announced plans to develop a comedy film based on the Madden curse. However, EA Entertainment executive Pat O'Brien stated in October 2014 that EA is not working on a Madden curse movie.

== Annual events ==
=== Madden Bowl ===
The Madden Bowl is a single elimination tournament held on the most current edition of Madden NFL. It has been held since 1995 during Super Bowl weekend in the host city and, in the past, participation included NFL players and celebrities. The Madden Bowl's participation has changed over the years from being an event held with athletes, musicians, and celebrities, to become an event where only NFL players who are invited to participate get a chance to play. Participants in the Madden Bowl are free to choose whichever team they like. Winners receive a Madden Bowl trophy and recognition in the upcoming Madden video game.

The 2006 Madden Bowl, held during the weekend of Super Bowl XL in Detroit, was televised on ESPN and premiered in April 2006. Concurrently, ESPN also hosted a separate series of competitions called Madden Nation, which was a reality television show that chronicled a cross-country trip to crown the best Madden player in the United States and aired from 2005 to 2008.

From 2011 to 2012, the Madden Bowl competition utilizes the new Online Team Play feature included in Madden NFL 11. Rather than competing as individuals, players form groups of three to square-off for the trophy. After this feature was discontinued, the Madden Bowl competition continued in a Head-to-Head format.

==== Winners ====
- 1995: Reggie Brooks
- 1996: Reggie Brooks
- 1997: Jimmy Spencer
- 1998: Morris Chestnut
- 1999: Ray Mickens
- 2000: Terry Jackson
- 2001: Jacquez Green
- 2002: Jacquez Green
- 2003: Dwight Freeney
- 2004: Dwight Freeney
- 2005: Michael Lewis
- 2006: Alex Smith
- 2007: Alex Smith
- 2008: Willis McGahee
- 2009: Antonio Bryant
- 2010: Maurice Jones-Drew
- 2011: Patrick Willis, Chad Ochocinco, and Maria Menounos
- 2012: Drew Brees, Jimmy Graham, and Tim Tebow
- 2013: LeSean McCoy
- 2014: Richard Sherman
- 2015: Patrick Peterson
- 2016: Eric Berry

==== Rookie winners ====
- 2006: Alex Smith
- 2007: Vince Young
- 2008: Devin Thomas
- 2009: Vernon Gholston

=== EA Super Bowl simulation ===
Since 2004, EA Sports has run a simulation of the Super Bowl using the latest game in the Madden NFL series and announced the result. The game simulations conducted by EA have correctly predicted 13 of the last 22 Super Bowl winners. The company accurately predicted the final score for the 2015 game and other details, including a score of 24–14 in favor of Seattle in the third quarter, despite skepticism within EA that Seattle would lose after a double-digit lead. The predictions were incorrect in 2008, 2011, 2014, 2016, 2018, 2019, 2021, 2022, and 2023. EA also releases a computer-generated description of the simulated game as if it were a summary of the real Super Bowl. The results of the simulated and actual Super Bowl games are listed below.

Year	Super Bowl	Madden's winner	Madden's loser	Actual score	Madden's prediction			Madden's record (based on Result)	Sources
Year	Super Bowl	Madden's winner	Madden's loser	Actual score	Score	Result	Points diff.	Madden's record (based on Result)	Sources
2004	XXXVIII	New England Patriots	Carolina Panthers	32–29	23–20	✓	✓	1–0	
2005	XXXIX	New England Patriots	Philadelphia Eagles	24–21	26–21	✓	✗	2–0	
2006	XL	Pittsburgh Steelers	Seattle Seahawks	21–10	24–19	✓	✗	3–0	
2007	XLI	Indianapolis Colts	Chicago Bears	29–17	38–27	✓	✗	4–0	
2008	XLII	New England Patriots	New York Giants	14–17	38–30	✗	✗	4–1	
2009	XLIII	Pittsburgh Steelers	Arizona Cardinals	27–23	28–24	✓	✓	5–1	
2010	XLIV	New Orleans Saints	Indianapolis Colts	31–17	35–31	✓	✗	6–1	
2011	XLV	Pittsburgh Steelers	Green Bay Packers	25–31	24–20	✗	✗	6–2	
2012	XLVI	New York Giants	New England Patriots	21–17	27–24	✓	✗	7–2	
2013	XLVII	Baltimore Ravens	San Francisco 49ers	34–31	27–24	✓	✓	8–2	
2014	XLVIII	Denver Broncos	Seattle Seahawks	8–43	31–28	✗	✗	8–3	
2015	XLIX	New England Patriots	Seattle Seahawks	28–24	28–24	✓	✓	9–3	
2016	50	Carolina Panthers	Denver Broncos	10–24	24–20	✗	✗	9–4	
2017	LI	New England Patriots	Atlanta Falcons	34–28 (OT)	27–24	✓	✗	10–4	
2018	LII	New England Patriots	Philadelphia Eagles	33–41	24–20	✗	✗	10–5	
2019	LIII	Los Angeles Rams	New England Patriots	3–13	30–27	✗	✗	10–6	
2020	LIV	Kansas City Chiefs	San Francisco 49ers	31–20	35–31	✓	✗	11–6	
2021	LV	Kansas City Chiefs	Tampa Bay Buccaneers	9–31	37–27	✗	✗	11–7	
2022	LVI	Cincinnati Bengals	Los Angeles Rams	20–23	24–21	✗	✓	11–8	
2023	LVII	Philadelphia Eagles	Kansas City Chiefs	35–38	31–17	✗	✗	11–9	
2024	LVIII	Kansas City Chiefs	San Francisco 49ers	25–22 (OT)	30–28	✓	✗	12–9	
2025	LIX	Philadelphia Eagles	Kansas City Chiefs	40–22	23–21	✓	✗	13–9	
2026	LX	Seattle Seahawks	New England Patriots	29–13	23–20	✓	✗	14–9	
