= Big Gene =

Big Gene may refer to:

- Eugene "Big Gene" Williams, a contestant on Madden Nation
- Big Gene Green, a character in Rolie Polie Olie

== See also ==
- Gene
