= Madden NFL 15 =

2014 video game

- North American cover art featuring Richard Sherman
- Developer: EA Tiburon
- Publisher: EA Sports
- Composer: Mark Petrie
- Series: Madden NFL
- Engine: Ignite (PS4 & Xbox One); Infinity 2 (PS3 & Xbox 360)
- Platforms: PlayStation 3 PlayStation 4 Xbox 360; Xbox One
- Release: NA: August 26, 2014; EU: August 29, 2014
- Genre: Sports

Madden NFL 15 is an American football sports video game based on the National Football League and published by EA Sports. The game was announced for the PlayStation 3, PlayStation 4, Xbox 360 and Xbox One on April 28, 2014. It was released on August 26, 2014, in the United States and three days later in Europe. As in previous years, EA Sports conducted a fan vote via ESPN to elect the cover athlete for the game. Seattle Seahawks cornerback Richard Sherman won the cover vote and the rest of the Legion of Boom defense was featured on the game's start menu. The PS3 and Xbox 360 versions are based on the previous game, Madden NFL 25.

== Cover vote ==
Due to the late release of the game, EA created a much smaller bracket than the previous years with a cover vote. It featured a 169-player bracket with offensive and defensive players. On June 6, 2014, Seattle Seahawks cornerback Richard Sherman was announced as the official cover athlete. Also featured in the bracket were Alshon Jeffery, Jimmy Graham, Demaryius Thomas, Luke Kuechly, Colin Kaepernick, Nick Foles, Cam Newton, Antonio Brown, Jamaal Charles, A. J. Green, LeSean McCoy, T. Y. Hilton, Andrew Luck, Eddie Lacy and Alfred Morris. The official cover image was released on the NFL's Instagram page.

== Development ==
The game was announced in late April 2014. It was shown in a release video featuring Carolina Panthers linebacker and Defensive Player of the Year Luke Kuechly. The game was further detailed at Electronic Entertainment Expo 2014; a particular emphasis was placed on improvements to defensive play. Creative director Rex Dickson noted that many players had difficulties with the pass rush and tackling. The "player lock" camera from NCAA Football 14 was added, along with a cone (similar to the controversial "QB Vision" cone from Madden NFL 06) to determine whether or not a player can make a non-aggressive tackle against a player from their current location.

In an effort to improve the presentation of the game, Brian Murray, who was mentored by NFL Films' Steve Sabol and was a consultant on previous editions, was given a new role as "Presentation Director" for the game. The game builds uses technology introduced in previous installments. It introduces a new "global dynamic camera system" to enhance the game's "broadcasts" and provide a professional touch with more details. Improvements include replacement of pre-rendered "post-play" cut scenes with dynamic scenes featuring players interacting naturally, and can respond to references of players by commentators with relevant camera shots and on-screen graphics along with the revival of the halftime show. Jumbotrons in stadiums now display scenes generated by the dynamic cameras (as opposed to generic splash screens or the same camera angle in use), and NFL teams also provided the graphics they use for their respective screens and ribbon displays.

Following Ray Rice's indefinite suspension on September 8, 2014, EA Sports announced that he would be completely removed from the game. His card in Madden Ultimate Team was renamed Baltimore Halfback #25.

== Release ==
The game was released in North America on August 26, 2014, for PlayStation 3, Xbox 360, PlayStation 4 and Xbox One.

== Soundtrack ==
Madden NFL 15's menu music was once again an original orchestrated score, composed by Mark Petrie. The soundtrack was reused in Madden NFL 16 and Madden NFL 17.

== Reception ==
Reception

Aggregate scores
Aggregator	Score
GameRankings	(PS4) 82.21% (XBO) 82.56%
Metacritic	(PS4) 82/100 (XBO) 80/100

Review scores
Publication	Score
Destructoid	6/10
GameSpot	7/10
GamesRadar+	4/5
IGN	8.7/10
Joystiq	4/5
Polygon	9/10
Hardcore Gamer	4/5

Madden NFL 15 was met with mostly positive reviews from critics. On Metacritic, the game has scores of 80 and 82 on Xbox One and PlayStation 4, respectively (both score higher than the respective scores of 73 and 74 that Madden NFL 25 received). IGN gave the game a score of 8.7/10, praising the graphics and improved gameplay, while noting the mediocre commentary, but said that it is both "exciting and reassuring" that EA Sports is not wasting opportunities to improve the series.

The PS3 and Xbox 360 versions of Madden NFL 15 received backlash for removing certain features; online team play was the most notable omission, forcing users to play only 1v1 games. In a review for gaming website Destructoid, Steven Hansen called the last-gen versions an "extra scummy ripoff" that tends to run poorly due to slow loading times and a "clunky" UI. Hansen also noted the absence of the defensive view and player lock features that were in the PS4 and Xbox One versions. Hansen summed up his review by declaring the PS3 and Xbox 360 versions "junky, janky and inferior".

During the 18th Annual D.I.C.E. Awards, the Academy of Interactive Arts & Sciences nominated Madden NFL 15 for "Sports Game of the Year".

Madden NFL 15 was the second best-selling retail game in the United States in 2014, behind Call of Duty: Advanced Warfare.
