= Madden NFL 25 (2024 video game) =

2024 video game

- Standard edition cover featuring San Francisco 49ers running back Christian McCaffrey
- Developer: EA Orlando
- Publisher: EA Sports
- Director: Jennifer Guimbellot
- Producers: Cory Butler; Tom Papadatos
- Designer: Josh Looman
- Programmer: Matthew Durfee
- Artists: Chen-Yu Hsieh; Terrance Newell
- Series: Madden NFL
- Engine: Frostbite
- Platforms: PlayStation 4; PlayStation 5; Windows; Xbox One; Xbox Series X/S
- Release: August 16, 2024
- Genre: Sports
- Modes: Single-player, multiplayer

Madden NFL 25 is an American football video game developed by EA Orlando and published by EA Sports. Announced on June 11, 2024, it is the 35th installment of the Madden NFL series and follows Madden NFL 24. The PlayStation 4 and Xbox One versions are based on the previous game, Madden NFL 24.

Madden NFL 25 was released on August 16, 2024, for PlayStation 4, PlayStation 5, Windows, Xbox One, and Xbox Series X/S. It is the second game to be released under the Madden NFL 25 title; the first was to celebrate the franchise's silver anniversary in 2013. San Francisco 49ers running back Christian McCaffrey is the cover athlete for the game; he is the first running back featured since the 2013 entry. Madden NFL 25 was the last Madden game to be released on the PlayStation 4 and Xbox One.

== New gameplay mechanics ==
Madden NFL 25 introduced several new gameplay mechanics and enhancements over its predecessor, Madden NFL 24:

BOOM Tech Tackling System: This physics-based system revolutionizes tackling by considering factors such as player weight, speed, momentum, and ratings to determine dynamic outcomes. It introduces more realistic and varied tackle interactions, moving away from predetermined animations.

Reloaded Hit Stick Mechanic: The Hit Stick has been revamped to emphasize timing and approach angle. Successful execution depends on precise timing and positioning, rewarding players with more impactful hits and a higher chance of causing fumbles.

Ball Carrier Balance and Recovery: Ball carriers can now brace for impact, stumble, and recover balance based on the defender's approach and the ball carrier's attributes.

Enhanced Skill Moves with Setup Mechanic: Hundreds of new moves, including jukes, spins, and hesitations, have been added. The new "Setup State" mechanic allows players to chain moves effectively by holding the sprint button and executing specific right-stick inputs, enabling more strategic and explosive plays.

Revamped Kick Meter: The kicking system now features a multimeter with separate horizontal and vertical components for accuracy and power.

It also introcued brand new presentation elements, including a revamped Super Bowl presentation, including a new NFL hallmark intro, and the NFL Draft experience, both of which feature the NFL commissoner, Roger Goodell, along with Randy Moss for the former, along with the addition of 34 tracks used for various stadiums, with some tracks returning from past Madden NFL titles, as well as two new broadcast teams: Mike Tirico & Greg Olsen and Kate Scott & Brock Huard, which will join alongside Brandon Gaudin & Charles Davis. It also featured over 1,000 new on-field sound effects, as well as realistic audience sound effects and crowd chants, which are sourced from NFL Films.

== Reception ==
Reception

Aggregate score
Aggregator	Score
Metacritic	(PS5) 70/100 (XSXS) 69/100 (PC) 65/100

Review scores
Publication	Score
Game Informer	7.5/10
GameSpot	6/10
GamesRadar+	3.5/5 stars
IGN	6/10
Shacknews	6/10

Madden NFL 25 received "mixed or average" reviews from critics, according to Metacritic.

Will Borger of IGN wrote a positive review, stating it is better than Madden NFL 24 and complimenting the game's "on-field action" as well as additions from College Football 25. However, Borger added that the game's modes are "functionally the same" and stated that the Franchise mode, while the game's "best thing," "still needs help." Borger wrote that "the improvements it did get are nice, but also long overdue, and you don't get a parade for doing things you should have done years ago."
