= John Madden Football (1994 video game) =

1994 American football video game

- Developer: High Score Productions
- Publishers: NA: EA Sports; JP: Electronic Arts Victor
- Director: Kelly Pope
- Producers: Michael Rubinelli; Scott Orr
- Designers: Ernest Adams; Happy Keller; Michael Madden
- Programmers: Monte Singman; Steve Sim; Craig Reynolds; Derrick Yim; Emmanuel M. Berriet
- Artists: Bob Rossman; Chuck Austen; Michael Becker
- Writer: Jamie Poolos
- Composer: Rob Hubbard
- Series: Madden NFL
- Platform: 3DO Interactive Multiplayer
- Release: NA: 6 May 1994; JP: 28 May 1994; EU: June 1994
- Genre: Sports
- Modes: Single-player, multiplayer

John Madden Football is a sports video game developed by High Score Productions and published by EA Sports exclusively for the 3DO Interactive Multiplayer. It is part of the Madden NFL series of games.

== Gameplay ==
John Madden Football features contemporary NFL teams, and historical football teams, as well as an all-Madden team of the best contemporary players, and an all-star team of historical players.

== Development and release ==
John Madden Football was released on the 3DO Interactive Multiplayer by EA Sports in North America on May 6, 1994. Electronic Arts Victor distributed the game in Japan that same month on May 28 as NFL Madden Football (NFL マッデン フットボール, NFL Madden Futtobōru). The 3DO officially launched throughout Europe in June 1994 with John Madden Football being one of 34 titles initially available for the console there. Initial sales were greater than expected for the region with 3DO European marketing manager Chris Thompson commenting, "Who would have thought it would be such a huge success in Europe?"

In 1995, Atari Corporation struck a deal with Electronic Arts to bring select titles to the Atari Jaguar CD, with John Madden Football among them but this version was never released due to the commercial and critical failure of the Atari Jaguar platform.

== Reception ==
Reception

Review scores
Publication	Score
Aktueller Software Markt	10/10
Computer and Video Games	82/100
Edge	9/10
Electronic Gaming Monthly	36/50
Game Informer	8/10
GamePro	5/5
Hyper	91%
Next Generation	4/5
3DO Magazine	5/5
Consoles +	87%
Electronic Games	A / A / B− / B+
Entertainment Weekly	B
MAN!AC	87%
Mega Fun	85%
Ultimate Future Games	89%
Video Games (DE)	79%

John Madden Football received largely positive reviews. Next Generation reviewed the game, rating it four stars out of five, stated that "This is simply the best arcade-style football game currently available."

Entertainment Weekly gave the game a "B" grade and said "This game's on-screen players are huge, the generous video clips are broadcast-TV quality, and there are enough obscure play options to satisfy Monday- and Tuesday- morning quarterbacks. But anyone willing to learn the difference between a quick slant I formation and a single-back halfback sweep is going to want more incisive commentary from Madden than, 'Now that was great defense!'"

In 1996, GamesMaster ranked the game 10th on their "The GamesMasters 3DO Top 10."
