= Madden NFL 20 =

2019 video game

- Standard Edition cover art featuring Patrick Mahomes
- Developer: EA Tiburon
- Publisher: EA Sports
- Designer: Clint Oldenburg
- Series: Madden NFL
- Engine: Frostbite 3
- Platforms: Microsoft Windows; PlayStation 4; Xbox One
- Release: August 2, 2019
- Genre: Sports
- Modes: Single-player; Multiplayer

Madden NFL 20 is an American football video game based on the National Football League (NFL), developed by EA Tiburon and published by Electronic Arts. The thirtieth installment in the long-running Madden NFL series, the game was released for PlayStation 4, Xbox One, and Microsoft Windows on August 2, 2019. It features Kansas City Chiefs quarterback Patrick Mahomes as the cover athlete. Mahomes became the second player after Rob Gronkowski to win a Super Bowl the same season they were on the Madden cover, and the first player to win the Super Bowl MVP while doing so, thus breaking the "Madden Curse", a curse where the cover athlete ended the season early due to injury.

== Development ==
Kansas City Chiefs quarterback and 2018 NFL MVP Patrick Mahomes was unveiled as the cover athlete alongside the game's announcement on April 25, 2019, becoming the first player for the Kansas City Chiefs to be on the cover of a Madden NFL video game.

The soundtrack includes 22 original tracks written specifically for the game, a first for the Madden franchise. The soundtrack includes songs by Sage the Gemini, Denzel Curry, De La Soul, Joey Badass, Jay Park, Wiz Khalifa, Dillon Francis, Snoop Dogg, Lil Skies and Saweetie.

Brandon Gaudin and Charles Davis are the in-game announcers, and Jonathan Coachman is the studio halftime and pregame host.

In Season 1 of post-launch content, Superstar KO is a brand new mode in which players can select a team with a head coach and three players in 1v1, 2v2 and 3v3 matches. Winning a match will add another player to the team. The goal in this mode is to win three matches to become the "undefeated champion". Losing a match will end the run. Each team has a unique playstyle, such as the Florida Keys, with DJ Khaled as the head coach, focusing on blitz plays, the Magicians, with Patrick Mahomes as the head coach and Twitch Prime as the sponsor, focusing on run pass options and play actions, and Backyard Heroes, with Lil Yachty as the head coach, focusing on sandlot plays.

The online servers for the game were shut down on April 15, 2024.

== Gameplay ==
Madden NFL 20 features a new "personalized career campaign" known as QB 1, following the journey of a player-created college quarterback from their participation in the College Football Playoff, to being drafted by an NFL team. Ten licensed college teams (Clemson, Florida State, Miami, Florida, LSU, Oregon, USC, Texas, Oklahoma, and Texas Tech) from the ACC, Big 12, Pac-12, and SEC, are available in this mode. The mode acts as an updated version of the "Superstar Mode", where the player would take their custom player and control them throughout a career, which was featured from Madden NFL 06 until its removal in Madden NFL 25.

In September 2019, EA Sports introduced another mode called Superstar KO, as part of the game's first "season". In each round, each team plays a drive from their 25-yard line to score a touchdown and a two-point conversion. If teams draw, the round is decided over a "tug-of-war", where each team does three plays, and the team that advances furthest wins the round. After each round, the winner can draft a player from the rival's team.

EA continued with including accessibility features for blind and visually impaired end users. Not least among these is menu narration, in which options are spoken aloud as the player navigates to them using synthesized speech. As part of his voice role for the game, Brandon advises via the game intro concerning accessibility settings and how to reach them. Other settings like image contrast and color-blind friendly settings are also available. While the majority of menus are narrated, some menus deep in franchise, for example, are not narrated. An example of this is when you are scouting college players, or are trying to purchase free agents or when you are attempting to complete the training. Menu narration is also notably absent from the in-game playbooks, although a text-only manual is available in the accessibility section of EA's website.

== Release ==
The game was released on August 2, 2019. It was able to be accessed three days prior on July 30 by those players who purchased the "Superstar" or "Ultimate Superstar" editions of the game, which included packs and special abilities.

== Reception ==
Reception

Aggregate score
Aggregator	Score
Metacritic	(XONE) 79/100 (PS4) 76/100 (PC) 72/100

Review scores
Publication	Score
Game Informer	7.5/10
GameRevolution	3/5
GameSpot	8/10
GamesRadar+	4/5
IGN	8.1/10
Shacknews	4/10

According to review aggregator website Metacritic, Madden NFL 20 received "generally favorable" reviews from critics for the console versions and "mixed or average" reviews for the PC.

IGN gave the game an 8.1/10 and wrote: "Madden NFL 20's new superstar players and control refinements make its moment-to-moment gameplay the best the series has seen this console generation, but areas like Franchise have been left behind." In its 8/10 review, GameSpot wrote that "Madden NFL 20 is an improved version of the annualized professional football series that excels in some areas and leaves something to be desired in others."

GamesRadar+ praised the updated story mode in comparison to Longshot and the addition of the X-factor players, saying that the game "clears the roster and properly initiates the rebuilding phase for football's first franchise," although noted Franchise mode again felt neglected. Game Revolution, which gave Madden NFL 20 a 3/5, also praised the X-factor addition, saying stars felt "bigger than ever", but was equally disappointed with the lacking in Franchise mode. Game Informer gave the game a 7.5/10, summarizing its review with: "New features can only do so much for a series that needs work in multiple areas."

In a scathing review, Shacknews gave the game a 4/10, calling it "the worst major sports league video game out there," criticizing EA for only making marginal improvements to previous installments.

=== Accolades ===
Year	Award	Category	Result	Ref.
2019	Game Critics Awards	Best Sports Game	Nominated	
2020	23rd Annual D.I.C.E. Awards	Sports Game of the Year	Nominated	
2020	NAVGTR Awards	Control Design, 2D or Limited 3D	Nominated	
2020	NAVGTR Awards	Game, Franchise Sports	Nominated	
