= John Madden Football (1990 video game) =

1990 video game

- North American Genesis box art
- Developer: Park Place Productions
- Publisher: Electronic Arts
- Designers: Troy Lyndon; Michael Knox; Scott Orr; Richard Hilleman; Jim Simmons
- Composer: Rob Hubbard
- Series: Madden NFL
- Platforms: Genesis/Mega Drive, Super NES, Amiga
- Release: Genesis/Mega Drive: NA: November 1990; EU: December 1990; Super NES: NA: November 1991; Amiga: EU: May 1992; NA: December 1992
- Genre: Sports (American football)
- Modes: Single-player, multiplayer

John Madden Football, released as John Madden American Football in Europe, is an American football video game released by Electronic Arts. Loosely based on the 1988 video game of the same title, it was the first entry in what eventually became the yearly Madden NFL series on home consoles, initially released for the Sega Genesis in 1990. It is sometimes called Madden '90 or Madden '91 to distinguish it from subsequent entries in the series.

A Super NES version was released in 1991, which incorporated new content that was also featured in the second Genesis installment released during the same year (John Madden Football '92), followed by a reworked Amiga version in 1992.

== Gameplay ==
The game includes various field conditions and audibles. The console versions use passwords for saves. It is played from above and behind the quarterback rather than from the side as most games of the time. As in the previous version, no actual NFL teams are included due to the lack of NFL or NFLPA licenses for authentic teams or player names.

In the 1990 Sega Genesis release, only a total of 16 teams are available. Each team was based unofficially on teams from the 1990 NFL season. The following generic teams are included, with colors based on the local NFL team: Buffalo, Miami, New England, Cincinnati, Houston, Pittsburgh, Denver, Kansas City, New York City (colors based on Giants), Philadelphia, Washington, Chicago, Minnesota, Atlanta, Los Angeles (colors based on Rams) and San Francisco. An All-Madden team is included as a bonus.

The Super NES release features twenty-eight teams and the All-Madden team. Like in the Genesis release, they are all generic, but each NFL city is represented and uses their respective colors (for instance, Cleveland's team colors are orange and brown). New York and Los Angeles’ teams are again represented by the Giants’ and Rams’ colors, meaning each city is only represented once. To fill out the team roster, teams from “Oakland” and “New Jersey” were added, with the former wearing silver and black like the Raiders and the latter green and white like the Jets.

== Development ==
In early 1990, Electronic Arts contracted Park Place Productions to develop a version of John Madden Football for the Sega Genesis. Whereas the earlier computer game had emphasized detailed simulation, producer Richard Hilleman and the Park Place developers sought to make the console game faster and more action-oriented while retaining elements of authentic football strategy. Park Place founders Troy Lyndon and Michael Knox had previously worked on the more arcade-oriented ABC Monday Night Football. Programmer Jim Simmons proposed displaying the field using a pseudo-three-dimensional perspective from behind the offense. The developers also replaced the previous game's passing system, which paused the action, with a system that assigned receivers to controller buttons. The Genesis version contained a professional-style playbook of 113 plays. Electronic Arts had independently reverse engineered the Genesis while negotiating with Sega over licensing terms. After demonstrating that it could produce Genesis software without Sega's assistance, EA reached an agreement that substantially reduced the royalties it paid per cartridge. EA founder Trip Hawkins later said the arrangement saved the company approximately $35 million over three years. During development, Sega's planned Joe Montana Football encountered difficulties and was unlikely to be completed for the 1990 holiday season. Sega president Hayao Nakayama asked Hawkins to allow the nearly completed Madden game to be released under Montana's name, but Hawkins declined. Electronic Arts instead helped produce both titles. Joe Montana Football was derived from the Madden code base but omitted the pseudo-3D field and reduced the playbook from 113 plays to 13.

== Commercial performance ==
Electronic Arts expected the Genesis version to sell approximately 75,000 copies, but it instead sold around 400,000 and became one of the company's first major console successes. The Strong National Museum of Play has described it as the Genesis's first hit game, while ESPN credited its strong sales with helping Sega compete with Nintendo in the North American console market.

== Reception ==
Reception

Award
Publication	Award
C+VG	Hit

Computer and Video Games reviewed the Mega Drive version John Madden American Football and gave it a 95% score, praising the realism and the sound. Sega Power gave it a 92% score.

British magazine The Complete Guide to Sega awarded the game 97% in May 1991, praising its extensive selection of plays and accessible controls. The reviewer considered the game particularly successful in allowing players to develop different strategies despite the complexity of American football.

The game also received favourable reviews in continental Europe. French magazine Joystick praised its realism and tactical depth, noting that the game made American football accessible to French players despite the sport's relative unfamiliarity in the country. German magazine Power Play awarded the Mega Drive version 81%, giving its graphics 80% and sound 77%, while discussing the game's extensive tactical options. Spanish magazine Hobby Consolas gave the game 86%, praising its realistic representation of the sport, graphical perspective and variety of strategic options.

The game also received coverage in Japan, where Mega Drive Fan introduced American football as a popular American sport and described the game's efforts to portray it realistically.

At the 1990 Golden Joystick Awards, John Madden American Football for the Mega Drive won the award for best console game of the year (16-bit).

In 2018, The Strong National Museum of Play inducted John Madden Football to its World Video Game Hall of Fame.

== Legacy ==
The success of John Madden Football led to annual sequels and helped establish a recurring-release model subsequently adopted by other video game franchises. The Strong credited the game and its successors with strengthening Electronic Arts' reputation as a sports-game publisher. ESPN similarly described the Genesis release as the game that transformed Madden into a major franchise.

The game's elevated perspective from behind the quarterback also influenced the presentation of televised American football. The Strong states that broadcasters subsequently adopted camera angles resembling the game's perspective and credits it with directly inspiring the wire-mounted Skycam used by ESPN.

In 2018, John Madden Football was inducted into the World Video Game Hall of Fame by The Strong National Museum of Play.

A biographical film about Madden, titled Madden, was released on Prime Video on November 18, 2026. Directed by David O. Russell, the film stars Nicolas Cage as Madden and John Mulaney as Electronic Arts founder Trip Hawkins, and depicts Madden's involvement in the creation of the Madden video game franchise.
