= Madden NFL '95 =

1995 American football video game

- European Sega Mega Drive cover art
- Developers: High Score Productions (GEN); Visual Concepts (SNES); Halestorm (GB); Tiertex, Extended Play Productions (GG)
- Publishers: NA/EU: EA Sports (SNES/GEN/GG); NA/EU: THQ (GB); (Note: Released under the Malibu Games brand name.)
- Composers: Brian L. Schmidt; Joel Simmons; Jim Simmons
- Series: Madden NFL
- Platforms: Genesis; Super NES; Game Boy; Game Gear
- Release: Genesis: NA: November 18, 1994; EU: November 1994; Super NES: NA: November 1994; EU: 1994; Game Boy: NA: November 1994; EU: 1994; Game Gear: NA: 1995; EU: 1995
- Genre: Sports
- Modes: Single player; multiplayer

Madden NFL 95 is an American football video game released by EA Sports in 1994. In addition to the usual home console versions that were released on the Sega Genesis and Super NES, this edition was also released for the portable Game Gear and Game Boy systems (although the Game Boy was released without the NFL license as Madden '95). It was the first version of the game that portrayed black NFL players as black, rather than all white as in previous versions, and the first in the Madden series to portray black athletes on the cover. It was also the first game in the series to have the official NFLPA license.

== Features ==
The Genesis version of Madden NFL '95 is the first Madden game to have both the NFL team logo and NFLPA licenses, allowing players to be identified by their names in addition to their squad numbers. The game reflects all NFL rosters and attributes for the 1994 season. This version of Madden NFL is also the first Madden to showcase no passing windows, though passing windows can be retained using the options menu. Previously included "Past Championship Teams" and "All-Franchise" teams are not included. Player stats are tracked individually both in-game and throughout a season. The cover features John Madden along with two NFL players, Dallas Cowboys right tackle Erik Williams and San Francisco 49ers defensive lineman Karl Wilson. Wilson has his number edited to show the number 70, which was not worn by anyone on the 49ers roster in the 1994 season.

It was released on the Game Boy, Game Gear, Genesis and Super NES.

The game features the theme song from the NFL on Fox by Scott Schreer, which John Madden joined shortly before the game's release.

== Reception ==
The two sports reviewers of Electronic Gaming Monthly gave the Super NES version scores of 85% and 90%, citing the improved animations and sounds from previous Madden games and the new rules and plays. GamePro's Weekend Warrior gave the Super NES version a positive review, expressing approval for both the game's many new features (particularly the ability to substitute players in any position) and the retention of the same user-friendly mechanics as previous Madden games. Reviewing the Genesis version in GamePro, Athletic Supporter noted that "unlike its SNES counterpart, Madden '95 on the Genesis doesn't always generate high-scoring games."[emphasis in original] Ben D. Rules, also of GamePro, commented that the Game Boy version, while having unavoidable portable limitations such as tiny, unrecognizable sprites and mediocre sound effects, has a surprisingly strong selection of teams and stats and well-designed gameplay. He concluded "While football on handhelds will probably never take off, this one's still a worthy effort." Fellow GamePro reviewer Tommy Glide similarly praised the Game Gear version as a worthy handheld effort which retains most of the options, teams, and plays of the home versions. However, he concluded that despite being "the best football game available for the Game Gear", it is not a worthwhile purchase due to the tiny, squint-inducing graphics and lack of multiplayer.

In 2012, Madden NFL '95 was listed on Time's All-TIME 100 greatest video games list. In 1995, Total! ranked the game 22nd on their Top 100 SNES Games. In 1995, Flux rated the Sega Genesis version 50th in its Top 100 Video Games writing: "The best in EA's seemingly endless football series."
