= Madden NFL 26 =

- Standard edition cover featuring Philadelphia Eagles running back Saquon Barkley
- Developer: EA Orlando
- Publisher: EA Sports
- Series: Madden NFL
- Engine: Frostbite
- Platforms: Nintendo Switch 2; PlayStation 5; Windows; Xbox Series X/S
- Release: August 14, 2025
- Genre: Sports
- Modes: Single-player, multiplayer

Madden NFL 26 is an American football video game developed by EA Orlando and published by EA Sports. Based on the National Football League (NFL), it is the 36th installment of the Madden NFL series, following Madden NFL 25.

The game was announced on April 24, 2025, and was released on August 14, 2025 for Nintendo Switch 2, PlayStation 5, Windows, Xbox Series X/S. With a simultaneous launch on Nintendo Switch 2, it is the first Madden entry to be released on a Nintendo console since Madden NFL 13 on Wii U and Wii. It is also the first entry to exclusively launch on ninth-generation home consoles, and the first in the franchise not to be released on the PlayStation 4 and Xbox One, following Madden NFL 25.

On June 2, 2025, Philadelphia Eagles running back Saquon Barkley was announced as the cover athlete for the game. The cover is inspired by Barkley's "reverse hurdle" over Jarrian Jones from the 2024 season. He is the second Eagles player to be on the Madden cover and the first since Donovan McNabb for Madden NFL 06.

== Gameplay ==
There are several modes of gameplay. They include:

- Ultimate Team – Players build their own team using NFL legends and current, real-life NFL players, before compete online with other users.
- Franchise – Players select a team to coach and oversee all operations including drafting players, what plays to run during a game, and the order of the depth chart.
- Superstar – The career mode as a player. It begins by participating in the NFL Combine and hoping to get drafted by an NFL team. Each week consists of goals and challenges to complete in addition to controlling just the player character in games.

This is the first entry in the Madden franchise to recognize long snapper as a distinct position. Furthermore, it also introduces new presentation packages, focusing on realism, which included three unique primetime presentation packages, based on those from Thursdays, Sundays and Mondays, each of which, including the Super Bowl, featured its unique NFL hallmark intro featuring Alan Roach, along with a halftime recap segment featuring Scott Hanson.

== Reception ==
Reception

Aggregate scores
Aggregator	Score
Metacritic	(PS5) 77/100 (XSXS) 81/100 (NS2) 77/100
OpenCritic	69% recommend

Review scores
Publication	Score
Game Informer	6/10
GameSpot	8/10
GamesRadar+	4/5
IGN	8/10
Nintendo Life	8/10
Nintendo World Report	8/10
Shacknews	7/10

Madden NFL 26 received "generally favorable" reviews according to review aggregator Metacritic. OpenCritic determined that 69% of critics recommend the game.
