= Madden NFL 17 =

2016 American football video game

- Standard Edition cover art featuring Rob Gronkowski
- Developer: EA Tiburon
- Publisher: EA Sports
- Series: Madden NFL
- Engine: Ignite (PS4, Xbox One); Infinity 2 (PS3, Xbox 360)
- Platforms: PlayStation 4 Xbox One; PlayStation 3 Xbox 360
- Release: August 23, 2016
- Genre: Sports
- Modes: Single-player; Multiplayer

Madden NFL 17 is an American football sports video game based on the National Football League and published by EA Sports for the PlayStation 4, PlayStation 3, Xbox One and Xbox 360. As the 27th installment of the Madden NFL series, the game was released on August 23, 2016 and features New England Patriots tight end Rob Gronkowski on the cover. It was the last Madden NFL game to be released on the PlayStation 3 and Xbox 360, And also the last Madden game to use the Ignite engine. The PS3 and Xbox 360 versions are based on Madden NFL 25.

== Development ==
On May 12, 2016, EA Sports uploaded a trailer to YouTube. They also revealed the new features that were added to the game, which includes an upgrade of the Ground Game, a redesigned and better Franchise Mode, "Madden 365", a new Ball Carrier UI Prompts help teach moves available to you, while the new Path Assist helps you navigate and anticipate down field and more. They also announced that they would hire new announcers, Brandon Gaudin and Charles Davis.

== Cover athlete ==
EA decided not to allow Madden players to vote for the Madden NFL 17 cover athlete, announcing it on May 12, 2016 via the SportsCenter Twitter account. After losing the Madden NFL 16 cover vote to New York Giants wide receiver Odell Beckham Jr., New England Patriots tight end Rob Gronkowski was announced as the cover athlete of Madden NFL 17.

== Features ==
Madden NFL 17 has developed a new ground game mechanic that provide players a more balanced experience. In addition to this, the new defensive AI puts players' teammates into positions to stop the run or pass game. Features such as Ultimate Team and Franchise mode will make a return, however, many of their features have been revamped and upgraded.

=== Soundtrack ===
On August 3, 2016, EA Sports announced the soundtrack for the game, which would feature 40 songs, including 2 Chainz, Flume, Steve Aoki, Logic, Blake Shelton, Brantley Gilbert, Bishop Briggs, Flo Rida, Flux Pavilion, Pusha T and Lil Wayne. The soundtrack was also made available for streaming on Spotify. The original score of Madden NFL 15 also returns in game and can be played through EA Trax.

== Reception ==
Reception

Aggregate score
Aggregator	Score
Metacritic	(XONE) 83/100 (PS4) 82/100

Review scores
Publication	Score
Game Informer	8.5/10
GameRevolution	4.5/5
GamesRadar+	4/5
IGN	8.6/10
Polygon	9/10

According to review aggregator website Metacritic, Madden NFL 17 received generally favorable reviews. IGN awarded the game an 8.6/10, praising the improved franchise mode and defense, but were disappointed in the game's commentary. GamesRadar gave it 4/5, saying: "With major changes to some of the game’s core mechanics, and an impressive revamp of the now marquee Franchise Mode, Madden 17 has done its best to avoid [accusations of phoning it in and failing to make significant progress], and succeeded."

During the 20th Annual D.I.C.E. Awards, the Academy of Interactive Arts & Sciences nominated Madden NFL 17 for "Sports Game of the Year".

According to the NPD Group, Madden NFL 17 was the best-selling retail game in the US in its month of release, but its launch month sales failed to surpass that of its predecessor, Madden NFL 16.
