= Madden NFL 16 =

2015 video game

- Standard Edition cover art featuring Odell Beckham Jr.
- Developer: EA Tiburon
- Publisher: EA Sports
- Composer: Junkie XL
- Series: Madden NFL
- Engine: Ignite (PS4, Xbox One); Infinity 2 (PS3, Xbox 360)
- Platforms: PlayStation 3 PlayStation 4 Xbox 360; Xbox One
- Release: August 25, 2015
- Genre: Sports
- Modes: Single-player; Multiplayer

Madden NFL 16 is an American football sports video game based on the National Football League and published by EA Sports for the PlayStation 3, PlayStation 4, Xbox 360, and Xbox One. Madden 16 introduced the new game mode "Draft Champions" to Madden. The game was released on August 25, 2015. The PS3 and Xbox 360 versions are based on Madden NFL 25.

== Development ==
The game was announced in late July 2015 on the EA Sports website. On May 13, 2015, EA announced that like Madden NFL 15, Madden Ultimate Team fans would be able to purchase the Madden NFL 16 Deluxe Edition, which would include the game along with $50 worth of Ultimate Team packs, for an extra $40. It was also announced that EA was working extensively on aesthetics, with new player spotlights, dynamic goals and achievements, and innovative on and off-the-field cameras.

== Cover athlete ==
EA decided not to have players vote for the cover athlete through a traditional bracket, but rather through collectible cards in Madden NFL Mobile, or through Ultimate Team on the console devices. On May 4, 2015, the four finalists were announced for the 2016 game cover: New England Patriots tight end Rob Gronkowski, Arizona Cardinals cornerback Patrick Peterson, New York Giants wide receiver Odell Beckham Jr., and Pittsburgh Steelers wide receiver Antonio Brown. The two finalists were announced on May 12 as Gronkowski and Beckham Jr. On May 13, Beckham Jr. beat Gronkowski for the cover of Madden 16. Beckham Jr. also became the cover athlete for Madden NFL Mobile following the vote, succeeding Madden 15 cover athlete Richard Sherman.

== Soundtrack ==
In June 2015, EA revealed that EA Trax would be re-integrated into the game, having been absent in the previous three installments. The soundtrack was also available for streaming on Spotify. The original score of Madden NFL 15 composed by Mark Petrie could also be played in-game via the EA Trax option.

== Reception ==
Reception

Aggregate score
Aggregator	Score
Metacritic	(XONE) 84/100 (PS4) 83/100

Review scores
Publication	Score
GameSpot	8/10
GamesRadar+	4/5
IGN	8.8/10
Joystiq	4/5
Polygon	9/10
Hardcore Gamer	4/5

Madden NFL 16 received positive reviews from critics, with many noting its improvements to the passing game, as well as the addition of the new Draft Champions mode.

During the 19th Annual D.I.C.E. Awards, the Academy of Interactive Arts & Sciences nominated Madden NFL 16 for "Sports Game of the Year".
