= Madden NFL 11 =

2010 American football video game

- Cover art featuring Drew Brees
- Developers: EA Tiburon; Page 44 Studios (iOS)
- Publisher: EA Sports (Note: iOS port released under the EA Mobile publishing label)
- Series: Madden NFL
- Platforms: PlayStation 2 PlayStation 3 PlayStation Portable; Wii; Xbox 360 iOS; BlackBerry
- Release: NA: August 10, 2010; AU: August 12, 2010 (PS3, X360); EU: August 13, 2010 (PS3, X360); NA: August 20, 2010 (BB)
- Genre: Sports
- Modes: Single-player, multiplayer

Madden NFL 11 is an American football video game based on the National Football League, published by EA Sports and developed by EA Tiburon. It is the 21st annual installment in the bestselling Madden NFL video game franchise. It was released in 2010 for the PlayStation 3, PlayStation 2, Wii, Xbox 360, PlayStation Portable, BlackBerry, and iOS platforms. The PS3 and Xbox 360 demos were released July 27, 2010.

== Features ==
The 2010 installment of the Madden NFL series headlined new features such as a play-calling system titled "GameFlow", a new game mode titled "Online Team Play", and an assortment of other features. The game was advertised as being "Simpler, Quicker, and Deeper" than previous versions of the game. The superstar mode for the Wii version was removed from this Madden installment.

"GameFlow" enables the player to create a situational game plan based on down and situation, and is advertised to speed up playing time as much as one half of the total game time from previous years of "Madden". Another addition is "Online Team Play", which supports 3 vs. 3 cooperative play. Players can also scout opponents in online head-to-head games to gain a competitive advantage. Other changes from previous installments include a new kick meter, new audible system, and an improved locomotion animation system. Lighting improvements, run blocking changes, new quarterback ratings, and a new Old Spice "Swagger" rating have also been added to the game. Gus Johnson does the play-by-play broadcast commentary, replacing Tom Hammond. One reviewer noted, Johnson's "penchant for the dramatic in real life keeps you on the edge of your seat as you turn the corner for a RB sprint or heave a desperation Hail Mary." Cris Collinsworth returns as color commentator from previous editions.

"Madden Ultimate Team" is a downloadable game mode released on January 7, 2011. In this mode, users are able to build a team by purchasing player packs. These packs are purchased with coins that are earned by winning a game, scoring a touchdown etc. They can also be purchased with real money through the user's PlayStation Network or Xbox Live accounts. As the user gains more coins, they are able to buy better packs of players, eventually building their "Ultimate Team".

== Cover ==
For the first time in the series, the fans were given the opportunity to vote for who would appear on the cover of Madden NFL 11. The choices were Alex Smith, quarterback of the San Francisco 49ers; Drew Brees, quarterback of the New Orleans Saints; Jared Allen, defensive end of the Minnesota Vikings; and Reggie Wayne, wide receiver of the Indianapolis Colts. Drew Brees pulled in the most votes and became the cover athlete.

== Demo ==
A demo of the game, featuring a game between the Indianapolis Colts and the New York Jets, was released on July 27, 2010.

== Marketing ==
In August 2010, Time Warner announced that it would offer a copy of Madden NFL 11 and a Making of Madden NFL DVD free with a paid subscription to Sports Illustrated. A similar offer was made available in 2009 with the release of Madden NFL 10.

== Reception ==
Reception

Aggregate scores
Aggregator	Score
GameRankings	(X360) 85.71% (PS3) 85.40% (iPhone) 79% (Wii) 76.50%
Metacritic	(X360) 84/100 (PS3) 83/100 (iPhone) 78/100 (iPad) 77/100 (Wii) 75/100

Review scores
Publication	Score
Destructoid	9.5/10
Eurogamer	7/10
Game Informer	8.75/10
GameRevolution	B+
GameSpot	8/10 (Wii) 6/10
GameSpy	4/5
GameTrailers	9.1/10
GameZone	9/10
Giant Bomb	4/5
IGN	8/10 (Wii) 7.5/10
Joystiq	4/5
Nintendo Power	8.5/10
Official Xbox Magazine (US)	9/10
PlayStation: The Official Magazine	8/10
The Daily Telegraph	8/10
The Escapist	5/5

The game was met with positive reception. GameRankings and Metacritic gave it a score of 85.71% and 84 out of 100 for the Xbox 360 version; 85.40% and 83 out of 100 for the PlayStation 3 version; 79% and 78 out of 100 for the iPhone version; 77 out of 100 for the iPad version; and 76.50% and 75 out of 100 for the Wii version.

GamePro gave the Xbox 360 version a score of four-and-a-half stars out of five and said that "hardcore Madden players may not appreciate all the changes, but those of us who are more casual fans have a lot to like." The same website, however, gave the iPhone version four stars out of five and said, "Everything from the 22 on-screen players to the stadium they're duking it out in looks great, and for the first time ever I felt like I wasn't playing a compromised or downgraded football experience despite the limitations of the iPhone platform."

The Escapist gave the Xbox 360 version all five stars and said, "I went into this game as a skeptic. Madden NFL 11 made me a believer." The A.V. Club gave the same version a B+ and said that it "offers a refreshing change of pace, making it a fine point of entry for newcomers and allowing stat-obsessed veterans a chance to peel away some of the layers added over the last few years." However, The Daily Telegraph gave the same version a score of eight out of ten and said, "What I've taken away from my time with NFL 11 is a new appreciation for the sport itself. It's genuinely exhilarating stuff."

Ultimate Team has received some negative feedback with regards to "Player Contracts" that are attached to each player card. When purchased, player cards have a ten-game contract that decreases by one every game (even if due to disconnection), and cannot be used afterward unless the contract is replenished, which requires a contract card purchased with coins. It is thus extremely difficult to keep a good team 'in contract' without spending real money, and players risk being unable to play the mode if they are low on coins.

== See also ==
- Madden NFL
- NCAA Football 11
