= John Madden Football (1988 video game) =

1988 American football video game

- MS-DOS box art
- Developer: Electronic Arts (Note: Additional work by Bethesda Softworks)
- Publisher: Electronic Arts
- Designers: Trip Hawkins; Robin Antonick; John Madden
- Programmers: C64, C128; Rob Johnson; MS-DOS; Robin Antonick; John Friedman
- Series: Madden NFL
- Platforms: Apple II, Commodore 64, Commodore 128, MS-DOS
- Release: Apple II; 1988; C64, C128, MS-DOS; 1989
- Genre: Sports (American football)
- Modes: Single-player, multiplayer

John Madden Football is a 1988 American football video game developed and published by Electronic Arts for the Apple II, following the success of Earl Weaver Baseball. It was later ported to MS-DOS and Commodore 64 in 1989, and was followed by the 1990 Sega Genesis video game of same name, which went on to become the yearly Madden NFL series. It is sometimes called Madden '88 or Madden '89 to distinguish it from later games in the series.

The game features many customizable aspects including conditions, time of quarters, player fatigue, player injuries, and penalties. Unlike future Madden games, this version does not feature season play. It has only single games, and no actual NFL teams are included due to the lack of NFL or NFLPA licenses for authentic teams, player names, and stadiums. However, some teams are based on real teams. One could also create a team from scratch in this game. The cover was also used on All-Madden Edition of Madden NFL 23 and was made by Chuck Styles.

== Development ==
Electronic Arts founder Trip Hawkins had long wanted to make a football game inspired by Strat-O-Matic Sports simulator games. Joe Montana and Joe Kapp were initially approached in 1982 to endorse the game, but both refused; Montana was already working on a rival football game with Atari, Inc., while Kapp proved to be outside of EA's budget. Hawkins eventually approached John Madden two years later, and EA hashed out an agreement. Madden was interested in the prospect of the resulting project being used as a teaching tool.

One sticking point for Madden was that 11 players had to be on each team, which was difficult due to technical limitations. EA had initially proposed that the game be played between two teams of six or seven, but Madden refused to endorse such a game. Due in part to this, as well as a legal issue involving Bethesda Softworks, whom EA hired to work on parts of the game, development eventually took three years. At the time, the title was referred to by those in the company as "Trip's Folly", with both employees of EA, as well as Madden himself, assuming that the game would be cancelled.

== Reception ==
Computer Gaming World reviewed John Madden Football favorably for providing both a simple "Quick Mode" of arcade-like play, and a deeper "Standard Game" with detailed player statistics and user-created plays.
