= Karl Wilson =

American football player (born 1964)

No. 72, 90, 77, 92, 91, 73
- Position: Defensive lineman

Personal information
- Born: September 10, 1964 (age 62); Amite City, Louisiana, U.S.
- Listed height: 6 ft 4 in (1.93 m)
- Listed weight: 277 lb (126 kg)

Career information
- High school: Baker (LA)
- College: LSU
- NFL draft: 1987: 3rd round, 59th overall pick

Career history
- San Diego Chargers (1987–1988); Phoenix Cardinals (1989); Miami Dolphins (1990); Los Angeles Rams (1991); New York Jets (1992–1993); Miami Dolphins (1993); San Francisco 49ers (1993); Tampa Bay Buccaneers (1994); Buffalo Bills (1995)

Awards and highlights
- First-team All-SEC (1986)

Career NFL statistics
- Tackles: 143
- Sacks: 15
- Fumble recoveries: 2
- Stats at Pro Football Reference

Karl Wendell Wilson (born September 10, 1964) is an American former professional football player who was a defensive lineman in the National Football League (NFL) for eight different teams. He was selected by the San Diego Chargers in the third round of the 1987 NFL draft. He played college football for the LSU Tigers.

Pre-draft measurables
Height	Weight	Arm length	Hand span	40-yard dash	10-yard split	20-yard split	20-yard shuttle	Vertical jump	Broad jump
6 ft 4 1/2 in (1.94 m)	258 lb (117 kg)	32 1/2 in (0.83 m)	9 1/2 in (0.24 m)	4.96 s	1.68 s	2.91 s	4.56 s	25.0 in (0.64 m)	9 ft 3 in (2.82 m)
All values from NFL Combine

With Dallas Cowboys left tackle Erik Williams, Wilson appeared on the cover of the video game Madden NFL '95, albeit with his jersey number changed to the unused number 70.
