= John Madden Football '92 =

1991 video game

- North American box art
- Developer: Park Place Productions
- Publishers: WW: Electronic Arts (Note: Released under the Electronic Arts Sports Network banner); JP: Electronic Arts Victor
- Producer: Michael Brook
- Designer: John Madden
- Programmer: Jim Simmons
- Composer: Michael Bartlow
- Series: Madden NFL
- Platform: Genesis/Mega Drive
- Release: NA: December 1991; EU: 1991; JP: November 20, 1992
- Genre: Sports (American football)
- Modes: Single-player, multiplayer

John Madden Football '92, released as Pro Football in Japan, is a 1991 American football video game developed by Park Place Productions and published by Electronic Arts for the Sega Genesis. It was the second Madden title released for the console, following the original John Madden Football from the previous year, starting the tradition of annual installments.

New aspects of this version include instant replay, two-player cooperative play, quarterback injuries, highlights, and more audibles. There are also new play modes, such as pre-season games, regular season games, playoffs, and sudden death, which was a way to simulate overtime in NFL games. Quarter lengths have been adjusted in this version to be set at 5, 10, or 15 minutes. As in previous versions of the video game, there are no NFL or NFLPA licenses for authentic teams, player names, and stadiums. Teams are organized by city name and colors.

== Development and release ==
John Madden Football '92 was released in December 1991 for the Sega Genesis. It was released in Japan in November 1992.

== Reception ==
Reception

Review scores
Publication	Score
AllGame	3.5/5
Electronic Gaming Monthly	9/10, 9/10, 9/10, 9/10
Game Informer	8/10, 9/10, 8/10
GamePro	5.0/5.0/5.0/5.0
MegaTech	95%

Award
Publication	Award
MegaTech	Hypergame

MegaTech gave the game 95% and a Hyper Game Award, saying that "you'll enjoy it, even if you don't care much for the sport". VideoGames & Computer Entertainment awarded the game an honorable mention in its best games of 1991, citing its "digitized speech of play-by-play announcing and its full 28-team lineup to choose from." In October 1992, Mega placed the game at #1 in their Top Mega Drive Games of All Time.

In Spain, John Madden Football '92 entered Hobby Consolas magazine's Mega Drive popularity chart at number three in June 1992. It remained prominent several months later, ranking fourth in the magazine's September 1992 issue.
