= Madden Nation =

- Genre: Reality TV
- Original language: English
- No. of seasons: 4
- No. of episodes: 32

Production
- Running time: 30 Min.

Original release
- Network: ESPN2
- Release: December 6, 2005

Madden Nation is an American reality television series, created as a joint effort between EA Sports and ESPN Original Entertainment to take viewers inside the world of Madden NFL, a popular video game with over 10 million players worldwide. The series premiered on December 6, 2005 and is currently off the air.

The eight episode series featured the nation's top Madden NFL gamers—along with real-life NFL player sponsors— playing against each other in elimination-style tournaments. Throughout the competition, the players traveled across the country in the Madden Nation Bus making their way to New York City for the tournament finals and a chance to win the $100,000 grand prize. The final game of every season was held in Times Square on the ABC Super Sign.

== Coach Cam ==
Coach Cam is a mechanic used during Madden Nation as a tool to provide insights into the minds of the players. Before certain plays, the gamers would reveal play selection to the television audience. Often, this mechanic would set expectations and provide a deeper understanding of the players’ strategies for the viewer.

== Season 1 ==
Madden Nation season 1 debuted on December 6, 2005 and ran for 8 episodes. Rob Taylor, a.k.a. Duka (d. July 2, 2007). defeated Sherman Jameson a.k.a. Sherm Sticky to become the champion of Madden Nation Season 1.

=== Format ===
The competition started in San Francisco, California where EA hand picked eight of the country's best Madden 06 players to play for a grand prize of $100,000. These elite gamers were not alone. Each one represented an NFL superstar that had their back. The gamers traveled city to city on a tour bus playing against each other in Madden competitions with two people losing their way into the jeopardy game. The loser of the jeopardy game must then play a free agent-gamer for the right to remain on the bus. In the end, the two best gamers of the bus played one game on the big screen in Times Square for $100,000.

=== Contestants ===
Contestant	Nickname	Gamer Tag	NFL Representative	Results
Rod Lane; 37, Dover, NJ	NJ Madden baller	ROD79	Jevon Kearse	Eliminated in episode 1
Christopher Jackson; 20, Atlanta	ActionJackson		Byron Leftwich	Eliminated in episode 2
Raymond Goode; 33, Waldorf, MD	Shopmaster	Shopmaster	Shaun Alexander	Eliminated in episode 3
Eugene Williams; 21, Philadelphia, PA	Big Gene		Ahman Green	Didn't show up for free agent game
Rod Wynn; 29, Ingelewood, CA	Reality	RealityWynn	Dwight Freeney	Free agent;eliminated in free agent game
Daniel Grundei; 27, Cincinnati, OH	Clark Kent		Ben Roethlisberger	Eliminated in episode 6
Justin Chow; 20, Great Falls, VA	Chow		Tony Gonzalez	Eliminated in episode 7
Kyle Hustek; 24, Detroit, MI	The Gift		Roy Williams	Eliminated in episode 7 (disqualified)
Charles Smith; 25, San Diego, CA	Solution		Donnie Edwards	Eliminated in episode 7, got on the bus Episode 1
Dan Bertholomey; 40, Portland, OR	Packwolf	Packwolf	Ashley Lelie	Got on the bus in episode 3, eliminated in episode 7
Antoin Williams; 23, San Antonio, TX	Pretty Boy		Larry Fitzgerald	Got on the bus in episode 2, eliminated in episode 8 during the semi-finals
David Grant; 26, St. Petersburg, FL	Dred		Michael Vick	Eliminated in episode 8 during the semi-finals
Sherman Jameson; 20, Midland, TX	Sherm Sticky		Chad Johnson	Lost to Duka in the finals during episode 8
Rob Taylor; 24, Youngstown, OH	Duka		Ed Reed	Champion; Got on the bus in episode 6

== Season 2 ==
Billy Wolf, a.k.a. Da Secret, defeated Frederick Amponsem, a.k.a. Fred Dizzle, to become the champion of Madden Nation Season 2.

=== Format ===
In its second season, Madden Nation once again documented the high drama of eight professional Madden NFL 07 players as they competed for a cash prize of $100,000. Again, each player represented an NFL superstar, but this time, the gamers began their journey at the EA Sports studios in Orlando. Unlike last year the contestants were paired in teams and forced to support each other or face elimination. On the 12-city tour, they battled each other for the right to stay in the game until the ultimate finale in Times Square, New York City.

=== Contestants ===
Contestant	Nickname	Gamer Tag	NFL representative	Results
Richard Thomas; 30, Brooklyn, NY	DJ Rhude	DJRhudeRT30	Michael Strahan	Left in episode 2 due to family matters
Federico Williams; 29, Wilmington, DE	Rico/Rico Hollywood	RicoHollywood	Vince Young	Walked off in episode 2
Michael Southam; 29, Adelaide, South Australia	Aussie	Blotto Otto	Antonio Gates	Eliminated in episode 3, replaced Young Jarvis in episode 4, eliminated again in episode 5
Thomas Tsanadis; 25, Orlando, FL	UCF Champ	UCF Champ	Alex Smith(Tampa Bay)	Free agent; eliminated in free agent game (episode 1)
Troy Brown; 22, Houston, TX	T-Roy	ALLWORKNOPLAY	Edgerrin James	Eliminated from the final 8
Robert Warren; 18, District Heights, MD	RJ	PeteSlash	Mario Williams	Eliminated from the final 8
Steven White; 27, Washington D.C.	Steve O Baby	SHAAAWTY	Joey Porter	Free agent; eliminated in free agent game (episode 4)
Mukala Sikyala Jr. 28, Riverdale, MD	Coach Muk	COACHMUK	Clinton Portis	Got on the bus in episode 5; eliminated from the final 8
Michael McAnany; 22, Rochester, NY	Mad Dog	MIKEMAC2001	Vince Young	Replaced Rico Hollywood in episode 2; eliminated from the final 8
Jarvis Thomas; 19, Upper Marlboro, MD	Young Jarvis	HUSTLE247	DeAngelo Hall	Replaced DJ Rhude in episode 2; disqualified in episode 3 for punching Mad Dog
Tommie Hill; 22, Brooklyn Park, MN	Therapist	TommyBears	Reggie Bush	Eliminated from the final 4
Donald Mazzola; 21, Bellevue, WA	DJ	THE DJ LAB	Carson Palmer	Got on the bus in episode 3, eliminated from the final 4
Frederick Amponsem; 22, Washington, D.C.	Fred Dizzle	FredDIZ	Randy Moss	Lost to Da Secret in the finals
Billy Wolf; 19, Tampa, FL	DaSecret	DaSecret	Willis McGahee	Champion

== Season 3 ==
Season 3 of Madden Nation began airing on ESPN2 on October 9, 2007 at 11PM ET. Airing as back-to-back episodes on Tuesdays, the finale, which again took place in New York City's Times Square, was televised Tuesday, Oct. 30, with the Madden Nation winner claiming a $100,000 prize. Tour stops in season 3 include NFL cities Dallas, Kansas City, St Louis, Chicago, Indianapolis, Cleveland, Buffalo, Boston and New York. The show ended in Times Square in New York. It was between Sirus the Virus, the Rams, and Problem, the Bears. The show finished off with Problem being the victor.

=== Contestants ===
Contestant	Nickname	Gamer Tag	NFL Representative	Results
Steve Williams; Sugar Land, TX	Coach	YourboyCoach	Roy Williams - DAL	Eliminated in episode 3
Haaruwn Brown; Mobile, AL	Houseshoe	Houseshoe251	Santana Moss - WAS	Eliminated in episode 2
Jesse Rhoads; Westville, NJ	J-Rhoads		Jonathan Vilma - NYJ	Eliminated from the final 4
Brian Delph; Sandusky, OH	Delph	Delph419	Shawne Merriman - SD	Eliminated from the final 8
Sheila Barger; Fresno, CA	PG-13	littlebitof pg13	T.J. Houshmandzadeh - CIN	Eliminated in episode 1
Jet Steele; Tampa, FL	Jet	Sonic Boom12	Samari Rolle - BAL	Eliminated from the final 8
Charles James; Bloomfield Hills, MI	Hollywood		Matt Leinart - ARI	Eliminated from the final 8
Van Bernardino; Napa, CA	Prodigy	NHFB	JaMarcus Russell - OAK	Eliminated from the final 8
Ronnie Casey; Louisville, KY	Sirus the Virus	SirusTheVirusTv	Steven Jackson - STL	Got on the bus in episode 2; Eliminated in final round
Marcus Phillips; Oakley, CA	Panoramic	5starzboss	Larry Johnson - KC	Got on the bus in episode 1; Eliminated from the final 4
Eric Wright; West Covina, CA	Problem	Snowman	Devin Hester - CHI	Got on the bus in episode 3; CHAMPION
Rafael Andrada; Converse, TX	Raf	SC0rp15	Reggie Wayne - IND	Free agent; eliminated in free agent game

== Season 4 ==
On Tuesday, September 16, 2008 at 11:00 p.m., ESPN2 began airing the fourth season of Madden Nation, a reality television series in which the country's top 10 Madden NFL 09 players competed in a cross-country elimination tournament on the Xbox 360 console. Gamers represented top NFL athletes and got the chance to meet their respective pro players along the way. The final tournament was played in New York City's Times Square for a grand prize of $100,000 and the ultimate title of the best Madden NFL gamer in the nation. Young Nephew was the champion after defeating Dynasty in the finals.

=== Contestants ===
Contestant	Nickname	Gamer Tag	NFL Representative	Results
Dan Brown; Troy, MI	Truth		Jeff Garcia - Buccaneers	Eliminated in episode 2 by KStarr
Anthony Brinson	Young Nephew		Adrian Peterson - Vikings	Champion (beat Dynasty 24-14)
Ryan Glick; Somerville, MA	RG		Braylon Edwards - Browns	Eliminated in episode 6 by Dynasty
Len Green; Philadelphia, PA	Dynasty		Patrick Willis - 49ers	Eliminated in finals (ep 8) by Young Nephew
Robert Hart; Philadelphia, PA	40 G's		DeMarcus Ware - Cowboys	Eliminated in semi-finals (ep 7) by Young Nephew(won in finals)
Jovan Lakey	Yomama		Darren McFadden - Raiders	Eliminated in episode 1 by Dynasty
Toby Merchant; Oakland, CA	T Fonk		Maurice Jones-Drew - Jaguars	Eliminated in episode 4 by Dynasty
David Stepney; Pomona, CA	One9		Drew Brees - Saints	Eliminated in semi-finals (ep 7) by Dynasty
Patrick Shaw; Indianapolis, IN	KStarr		Bob Sanders - Colts	Eliminated in episode 3 by Dynasty
Eugene Williams; Philadelphia, PA	Big Gene		Hines Ward - Steelers	Eliminated in episode 5 by Dynasty
