= Madden NFL 25 (2013 video game) =

- North American seventh-generation cover art featuring Barry Sanders
- Developer: EA Tiburon
- Publisher: EA Sports
- Composer: Christopher Lennertz
- Series: Madden NFL
- Engine: Ignite (PS4, Xbox One); Infinity 2 (PS3, Xbox 360)
- Platforms: PlayStation 3 PlayStation 4 Xbox 360; Xbox One iOS; Android
- Release: PlayStation 3, Xbox 360, iOS: NA: August 27, 2013; EU: August 30, 2013; PlayStation 4: NA: November 15, 2013; EU: November 29, 2013; Xbox One: WW: November 22, 2013; Android: WW: December 23, 2013
- Genre: Sports

Madden NFL 25 is an American football sports video game based on the National Football League and published by EA Sports. It was released for PlayStation 3 and Xbox 360 in August 2013. Instead of numbering it Madden NFL 14 with the year like in previous versions, the "25" in the title refers to the 25th anniversary of the Madden NFL series. The eighth-generation console versions of Madden NFL 25 are the first games to run on EA Sports's Ignite game engine. However, the seventh generation versions still run on EA's previous game engine, Impact. The seventh-generation versions featured former Detroit Lions running back Barry Sanders on the cover, while the eighth-generation versions featured Minnesota Vikings running back Adrian Peterson, and were released as launch titles for the PlayStation 4 and Xbox One in November 2013.

== Gameplay ==
In Connected Franchise career mode, players own and manage a National Football League (NFL) team. Players can also move teams to new cities, including international markets like Toronto, Mexico City, Dublin and London, or revive historic teams like the Houston Oilers or the London Monarchs from NFL Europe. It was the first time this happened since Madden NFL 12 for the franchise and team relocation since Madden NFL 09.

== Development ==
The game was announced in early 2013. It was shown in conjunction with EA Sports's Ignite game engine announcement at Microsoft's Xbox One reveal as one of four upcoming games to use the engine. Electronic Arts confirmed the game as an Xbox One and PlayStation 4 launch title at its E3 2013 press conference.

Improvements over the previous Madden titles include upgraded graphics (including for the first time real metallic shine for teams with metallic helmets for the Xbox One and PS4 releases), better real-time physics, new running controls, and a reactive environment, including a playing field that wears out in high-activity areas. The next-gen console versions are better equipped to handle these updates due to their extra processing power. Player-character foot tracking is five times as accurate on the newer consoles. The debuting Ignite game engine tracks all on-field players simultaneously in order to predict path collisions for more realistic impacts. The game can also store more animations to make player movement more realistic. The next-gen versions will also include exclusive features, such as an improvement to pass blocking where increased computer player awareness lets the artificial intelligence change priorities mid-play and double-team players, new to the Madden series. These choices are designed to let the player think more like the quarterback instead of retreating every play to evade the rushing defensive players.

=== Cover player selection ===
Hall of Fame running back Barry Sanders, who played for the Detroit Lions from 1989 until 1999, won the contest to be featured on the video game's cover over Adrian Peterson of the Minnesota Vikings, with 58 percent of the vote. Sanders became the first player to appear on the cover of Madden NFL more than once (he appeared in the background of the Madden NFL 2000 cover). Electronic Arts later announced that Peterson would be on the PlayStation 4 and Xbox One game covers, while Sanders will remain on the Xbox 360 and PlayStation 3 cover.

== Release ==
The game was released on August 27, 2013 for PlayStation 3 and Xbox 360. It was released as a launch title for the PlayStation 4 on November 15, 2013 and as a launch title for Xbox One on November 22, 2013. An announced Anniversary Edition available only at Amazon.com includes a code for NFL Sunday Ticket access.

=== Pre-order bonuses ===
Madden NFL 25 includes multiple pre-order bonuses. If pre-ordered through GameStop the user will receive head coach Bill Walsh and quarterback Joe Montana for Madden Ultimate Team and Connected Franchise and Eddie DeBartolo, Jr. for Connected Franchise. If pre-ordered at Wal-Mart; John Madden, Tom Flores, and Fred Biletnikoff for Madden Ultimate Team and Connected Franchise. Amazon: Rod Woodson and Franco Harris for Madden Ultimate Team and Art Rooney, Sr. for Connected Franchise. At Best Buy: head coach Jimmy Johnson and Troy Aikman for Madden Ultimate Team and Connected Franchise. If ordered from Target: Mike Ditka and William "The Refrigerator" Perry for Madden Ultimate Team and Connected Franchise. And finally, if ordered from Origin: Kurt Warner and Warren Moon for Connected Franchise.

== Soundtrack ==
Madden NFL 25's menu music was once again an original orchestrated score, composed by Christopher Lennertz. The licensed soundtrack only plays in stadiums.

== Reception ==
Madden NFL 25 received mostly positive reviews. Jack Devries of IGN gave the game 8.5/10, praising the improved franchise mode, while criticizing the repetitive touchdown celebrations and glitchy presentation, such as the fictional tweets which say teams "barely won", when the final score is 35-14. Joystiq's Mike Suszek scored the game four stars out of five, commenting on the inconsistency of the running game, as a result of the sensitive collision detection of the Infinity engine. On the contrary, Dustin Toms of Operation Sports praised the running game, primarily due to the addition of the pistol offense; Toms scored the game as 7.5.

Brett Todd of GameSpot criticized the commentary by Jim Nantz and Phil Simms, stating that they "offer nothing but inanities, generic observations about the 'offense' and the 'defense' that rarely refer to players by name, and loads of those obnoxious 'I'll tell you what' tics that make Simms so insufferable." Todd also commented that the passing game is too overpowered, though he praised the "Run Free" addition. Ultimately, the score given by Todd was 6.0. Forbes' Erik Kain also criticized the commentary, stating that the exclusive rights deal between EA and the NFL hindered the amount of improvements to the series. On the positive side, Kain praised the "Run Free" feature, calling it a welcome addition to the franchise. Steven Hansen of Destructoid praised the physics, but noted the possible lack of replay value, calling it "Madden XIII-2" due to it being too similar to Madden NFL 13. GameZone's Lance Liebl gave the PS4 version an 8/10, stating "If you're a football fan and an early owner of one of the next-gen consoles, go out and get Madden NFL 25. There's enough improvements to justify buying it, especially if you do the trade-up program for Xbox One."

During the 17th Annual D.I.C.E. Awards, the Academy of Interactive Arts & Sciences nominated Madden NFL 25 for "Sports Game of the Year".

Madden NFL 25 for Android and iOS received negative reviews, the iOS version receiving a Metacritic Metascore of 39 based on two mixed and six negative critic reviews. Eric Ford of Touch Arcade gave the game a 1/5 rating, criticizing the game's highly simplified football matches and excessive freemium Pay-to-win elements. Matthew Diener of Pocket Gamer gave the game a 2/5 rating, criticizing sticky and unresponsive controls which "pose more of a challenge than the AI does" and Free-to-play elements.
