= Richard Hilleman =

American video game producer

Richard Hilleman is an American computer game and video game producer best known for his work creating the original Madden Football game for video game consoles for Electronic Arts. Apart from Madden, Hilleman was a key figure in building the massive EA Sports brand and has spent over 20 years working in product development at EA. He has directly or indirectly influenced a wide range of games and game designers.

Hilleman joined Electronic Arts in 1982, and was employee number 39. After several years working with producers and teams in a variety of roles (including Ray Tobey and Stewart Bonn on the early combat flight simulator Skyfox), he began producing his own titles in the late 1980s. His first credited title as producer was Indianapolis 500: The Simulation on PC in 1989.

In 1990, he was the producer of John Madden Football for the fast-growing Sega Genesis, a game developed by Troy Lyndon and Michael Knox of Park Place Productions, and co-designed by Scott Orr, the game that we still recognize today as Madden Football, the best-selling title in the history of games in North America.

A team member of the Madden team, Scott Orr joined Hilleman later at EA full-time in 1991 where both Hilleman and Orr were promoted to senior management roles in EA product development over the following few years. Hilleman was later named vice president in charge of Production for the company. An avid hockey player during his youth in Minnesota, Hilleman was Executive Producer or Producer for other successful EA Sports titles in the 1990s as well, including NHL Hockey, NHLPA Hockey, PGA Tour Golf and Tiger Woods Golf.

Rich Hilleman worked for Electronic Arts as Chief Creative Officer until May, 2016. He also serves on the board of directors of the Academy of Interactive Arts & Sciences.

In 2009, he was chosen by IGN as one of the top 100 game creators of all time.
