= Hometown Tales =

Hometown Tales began as a Public-access television cable TV program in the New Jersey, New York and Pennsylvania area in 2002. It was created by a producer from New Jersey, Gene Fitzpatrick and a writer from New Mexico, Bryan Minogue. It soon expanded into a popular podcast, radio program and website.

Hometown Tales focuses on urban legends, folklore, historic oddities, ghost stories and local culture from towns all over. All this is done with a light hearted twist and friendly exchange by the hosts. Gene Fitzpatrick plays the role of the skeptic while Bryan Minogue is frequently fearful of the paranormal stories. Emphasis is put on the tales, and not their veracity; therefore a pure urban legend will be treated on equal ground with a true story.

The television program resulted in nine 30 minutes episodes which still air on many Public-access television channels like Patriot 8 from Patriot Cable in Somerset, NJ, Cablevision of Morris and others. Many of those segments have been re-purposed in a vidcast feed as well as on the Hometown Tales website.

Hometown Tales began producing a podcast to support the TV show. It was one of the earlier podcasts on the scene and peaked in the Top 10 of most popular podcasts on Podcast Alley. For a brief period of time the program aired on Sirius Satellite Radio as part of Dawn and Drew Presents. Even though the program was used by Dawn and Drew during their block of air time on Sirius courtesy of Adam Curry's Podshow, Hometown Tales was never actually contracted by Podshow later known as Mevio. They were also featured heavily on KYOU Radio in San Francisco. While the shows decreased to a bare minimum during 2012 and 2013, they returned in November 2014 and release new recordings inconsistently.
