= Sebastian Rupley =

American journalist

- Born: U.S.
- Occupation: journalist
- Website: Cranky Geeks GigaOM

Sebastian Rupley is an American technology journalist and commentator. He lives in San Francisco, California with his wife.

== Career ==
Rupley was the Editor-in-Chief of the GigaOM network.

Prior to GigaOM, Rupley was Editorial Director for PCMagCast, PC Magazine's channel for live Web seminars and online events on tech topics for consumers and small businesses. Before that, he was West Coast Editor of PC Magazine for over a decade, where he oversaw news and feature stories for the publication, and represented the brand on panels and at conferences on the West Coast. He also served as Features Editor of PC/Computing magazine, managing and promoting many noted technology journalists.

A familiar face to leaders at technology companies, Sebastian has won numerous national journalism awards, including back-to-back Gold awards from the American Society of Business Professional Editors in 2004 and 2005 in the category of Original Web Content, and awards from the Computer Press Association.

Rupley is the author of the book Portable Computing, one of the first titles ever to appear about laptop computers and mobile technology.

From March 2006 until May 2010, Rupley had served as co-host (introduced as "co-crank"), alongside PC Magazine columnist John C. Dvorak, on Mevio's popular weekly IPTV show Cranky Geeks. He selected topics from current events in the technology industry, and participated in discussions moderated by Dvorak. Rupley announced his departure from Cranky Geeks during the May 12, 2010 episode.

== Awards ==
Rupley has won numerous national journalism awards, including back-to-back Gold awards from the American Society of Business Professional Editors in 2004 and 2005 in the category of Original Web Content, and awards from the Computer Press Association.
