= Micky Hoogendijk =

Dutch actress and photographer

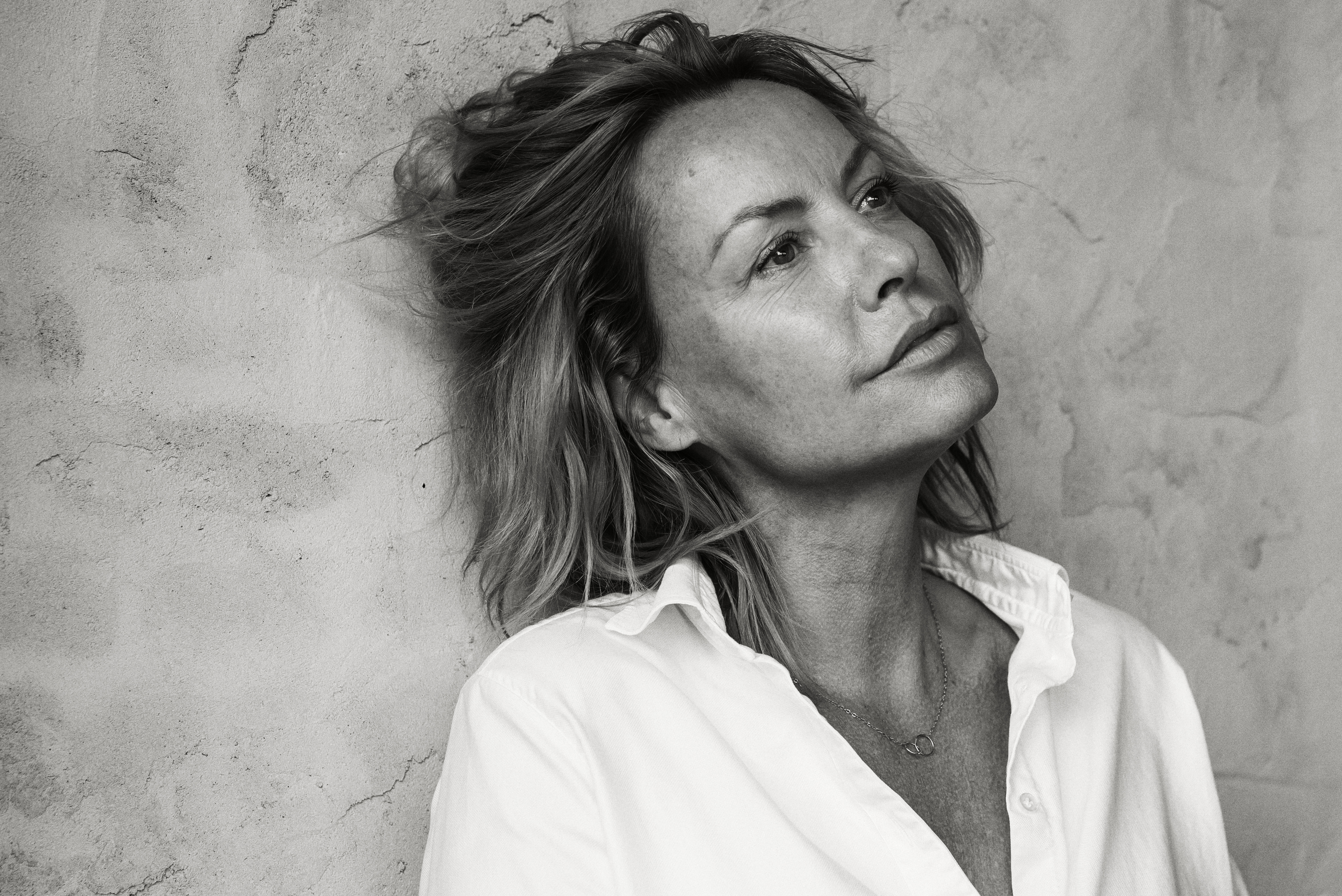
- Born: July 8, 1970 (age 55); Amsterdam, Netherlands
- Citizenship: Dutch
- Known for: actress, photography
- Spouse(s): Rob Scholte (1994–1997); Adam Curry (2012–2015)
- Website: mickyhoogendijk.com

Micky Hoogendijk (born July 8, 1970) is a Dutch actress, presenter, model and professional photographer.

== Life and career ==
Hoogendijk was born in Amsterdam. She is one of the first people in the Netherlands to be conceived via artificial insemination. She was raised by her mother in an international art environment.

=== Marriage and bombing incident ===
In 1990 she met artist Rob Scholte. Rob Scholte and Micky Hoogendijk married in 1994. Six months after their marriage, a grenade exploded under their car while they were driving through the Jordaan, a neighborhood in Amsterdam. Rob lost both legs. The persons responsible for the explosion were never identified. After the explosion Hoogendijk and Scholte moved to Tenerife, to rebuild their life there. In 1997 Hoogendijk moved back to Amsterdam, where the couple separated.

=== Acting career ===
From 2000-2002, Hoogendijk played a role in the Dutch soap opera Goede tijden, slechte tijden. She played the part of villainous Cleo de Wold, a pathological manipulator.

In 2002 she moved to Los Angeles for lessons in method acting at the academy of Eric Morris. In 2004 she came back to the Netherlands, but would return to L.A. twice a year for acting classes. During this time, she appeared alongside Kate Hudson in the movie, Raising Helen. She also worked with Rutger Hauer.

Hoogendijk has acted in several Dutch series including Spangen, Blauw Blauw, Grijpstra en de Gier, Koefnoen and Parels en Zwijnen. In November 2004 Hoogendijk lent her body for the video game Killzone. The main character Luger has Hoogendijk’s looks and appearance. In 2008 she received the award Best Actress in a Feature Film at the New York International Independent Film & Video Festival for her role in the Dutch movie Blindspot.

=== Businesses ===
After spending time in front of the camera, she worked behind the scenes as creative director and producer. She founded Micky Hoogendijk Productions and started as creative director of the Supperclub. Since 2007, the Supperclub is in Amsterdam, San Francisco, London, Singapore and Istanbul. Supperclub Los Angeles opened in 2010, and there are plans to start a Supperclub in Las Vegas. In 2006, she started film production company Dramatic Beat, a website for young film producers.

=== Current ===
In April 2009 Micky Hoogendijk was known to be romantically involved with Adam Curry, leading to Adam's divorce from Patricia Paay. At the end of 2011 the couple moved to Austin, Texas. They got married in 2012.

On January 29, 2015, Curry announced on the No Agenda podcast that he and Hoogendijk had separated and a divorce may be pending.

Hoogendijk began her photography shortly after being given a Nikon D5000 by Curry and her mother. After publishing her work for review online, she quickly received professional offers. International Art Gallery AmstelGallery showed Hoogendijk’s work in Amsterdam, Los Angeles, Washington and Istanbul. Hoogendijk's work has also been featured in art shows in Tokyo, Mexico and Austin.
