= Daily Source Code =

Technology podcast

- Genre: talk; technology; music
- Language: English

Cast and voices
- Hosted by: Adam Curry

Technical specifications
- Audio format: MP3

Publication
- No. of episodes: 1
- Original release: August 13, 2004 – November 30, 2013
- Updates: Weekly Updates

Related
- Website: thedailysourcecode.com (Restored and Reconstructed) web.archive.org/web/20120314093109/http://www.dailysourcecode.com/ (archived)

The Daily Source Code (DSC) was a podcast by Adam Curry, known as the "Podfather", often considered a pioneer of podcasting. Curry talked about his everyday life and events in the podcasting scene or the news in general, as well as playing music from the Podsafe Music Network and promotions for other podcasts. He had regular returning segments which were mostly contributions from fellow podcasts and his daughter Christina occasionally made guest appearances. The show had more than 500,000 subscribers at its peak.

== History ==
The first edition was published on August 13, 2004, as a live show that software developers could use as a test for their download software. Podcasting technically already existed at that time, but Adam was the first to bring together RSS, scripting, and actual audio content (in a format much like a radioshow). He has since increasingly become the voice of the active podcasting community, helping fellow podcasters and founding initiatives such as Podshow and the Podsafe Music Network.

In September 2007, the number of broadcasts slumped dramatically following a Curry family reunion in Fire Island, New York State. Far from being daily, Curry started leaving gaps of up to five days between podcasts. Ongoing problems with the Podshow network web sites, which Curry founded, were rumoured to be partly to blame.

The Daily Source Code was one of the shows featured by Adam Curry on Sirius Satellite Radio in his "Adam Curry's PodShow" from May 1, 2005 till the end of the contract in May 2007. Since May 4, 2006 (episode 380) Curry has been promoting Daily Source Code in Second Life under the name "Adam Neumann" via Curry Castle.

On episode 813, Curry trialed a semi-live format where the show was streamed and listeners of the show could call in.

In February 2009, Curry moved his attention to producing the No Agenda podcast with John C. Dvorak, causing the production of the Daily Source Code to become more intermittent. By February 16, 2009, the production of the Daily Source Code was suspended.

On March 19, 2010, after a year of hiatus, Curry resumed the Daily Source Code with episode 822, focusing more on music. However, it was announced on an episode of No Agenda that Curry would not be continuing production of the Daily Source Code, fearing penalties for copyright infringement.

Curry produced another episode of the Daily Source Code in May 2012, however, and announced plans to continue the podcast. As of 2015, only two more episodes had been produced: #866 in August 2012 and #867 in November 2013. In 2016 Curry again began regular production.

== Signatures ==
=== Signature introduction ===
The DSC's signature introduction, "...with 16 million dollars' worth of airplane strapped to my ass, and the next generation radio content in my ears, I'd like to think I'm flying into the future" started life as a comment Curry received from airline pilot Christopher Stork during the podcast's early days (March 2005). Curry read it out during a show, and that recording (along with other audio clips used previously as part of the show's opening sequence) were utilized by a listener and contributor to produce a show opening, which was submitted back to Adam Curry. Curry loved the produced piece so much, that he made it a predominating feature of the show's opening. It became the podcast's signature introduction and was highly recognized and often mimicked on other podcasts. Although the listener/contributor that produced the piece was never actually mentioned on the show, it was the voice-over artist known as "Kevin the Announcer Guy", the imaging announcer for the early days of Jan Polet's Hit Test, a prominent feature played on the Daily Source Code.

=== Signature conclusion ===
Starting in 2010 Adam Curry finishes each show with:

Live your life with passion – and, as long as it lasts, enjoy your freedom.
