= Inspired Media Entertainment =

- Industry: Video games
- Predecessor: Left Behind Games
- Founder: Troy Lyndon
- Defunct: 2011

Inspired Media Entertainment, also known as Left Behind Games, was a Christian-themed gaming company most notable for its work on Left Behind: Eternal Forces. The company closed their office, shut down operations, and laid off all of their employees at the end of 2011.

== History ==
The company was started by Internet entrepreneur Troy Lyndon whose original goal was to make a video game series to tie into the popular Left Behind series. The game, Left Behind: Eternal Forces was released in 2006. It later evolved into a Christian gaming portal which incorporated not only the Left Behind series but hundreds of other Christian-themed games. According to founder Troy Lyndon, the goal was to produce an average of fifty games per year and set up a web link of at least three thousand churches.

== Controversy ==
The company faced some criticism from social activists for its flagship Left Behind game, which was falsely accused of rewarding players for killing the opposite side or neutral units during the course of the game. President Jeffrey Frichner, cofounder the company, argued against these claims, noting that killing people in the game costs the player spirit points and that the game's objectives can be completed using exclusively nonviolent strategies. In addition, the game's manual states that there are penalties for killing units and firmly discourages the player from doing so. Despite a planned petition to Walmart to discontinue the game, the company declined to pull the game from its shelves citing high sales.

== United States SEC Lawsuit ==
On September 25, 2013, the United States Securities and Exchange Commission made public their pending lawsuit against Left Behind Games. They allege that CEO Troy Lyndon issued nearly two billion unregistered shares to a prison ministries pastor named Ronald Zaucha in exchange for consultation services, millions of which were sold for $4.6 million, $3.3 of which were kicked back to the company, as part of a plan to (according to allegations) dupe investors into believing that the company was thriving. The SEC suspended trading of the company's shares pending review.

== Product list ==
- King Solomon series
- Scripture Chess
- Left Behind: Eternal Forces
- Left Behind 2: Tribulation Force
- Left Behind 3: Rise of the Antichrist
- Left Behind 4: World at War
- Keys of the Kingdom
