= Michael Knox (software businessman) =

American businessman

Michael Anthony Knox (February 1, 1961 – September 15, 2009) was an American software businessman and expert. Knox was a co-founder of Park Place Productions with Troy Lyndon in 1989, which produced such classic video games as John Madden Football and Muhammad Ali Heavyweight Boxing.

Knox first became interested in the software gaming industry while he was living in Tracy, California, with his family. A woman, who lived in the area, introduced Knox to the fledgling video game industry. Knox and his older brother, Richard Knox Jr., later enlisted in the United States Navy, where he worked as an engineer and computer programmer. He later worked for Gamestar and Pacific Dataworks International as he met Troy Lyndon.

In 1989, Knox founded Park Place Productions with Troy Lyndon. At the time, Park Place Productions was one of the largest independent software development companies in North America. With Knox as a producer, the company developed approximately 70 video game titles, including John Madden Football, which has been called "the most successful sports game of all time." Other notable productions included Batman Returns, Monday Night Football and Muhammad Ali Heavyweight Boxing. At Park Place, the company launched its own label, Spirit of Discovery for edutainment and PC titles. The company eventually went into trouble, and shuttered soon.

Knox and Lyndon received the Inc. Magazine's "Entrepreneur of the Year" award by Ernst & Young and Merrill Lynch for the software industry category for the Greater San Diego Country region in 1993. In 1994, Spirit of Discovery became its own independent entity. In the 2000s, he was on the board of directors for Left Behind Games.

Michael Knox died on September 15, 2009, of colon cancer in Kaneohe, Hawaii, at the age of 48. He is survived by his parents, Vickie Lenore Knox and Richard James Knox Sr., son Aaron Michael Knox, daughter Tyra Renee Knox, sisters Kanani L.Y. Fung and Kahle Miller, and two grandchildren.
