= PMN =

PMN may refer to:

- National Mobilization Party (Partido da Mobilização Nacional), a political party in Brazil
- Podsafe Music Network, an Internet music archive
- Polymorphonuclear leukocytes, or granulocyte
- Polymorphonuclear neutrophil, the most abundant white blood cells in the peripheral blood of many mammals
- Promenade MRT station, Singapore (MRT station abbreviation)
- PMN mine, an anti-personnel mine
- Panglima Mangku Negara, a Malaysian honour
- Pacific Media Network, a New Zealand radio network
- Paramount Media Networks, the pay-TV division of Paramount Global
