= C.C. Chapman =

American professor

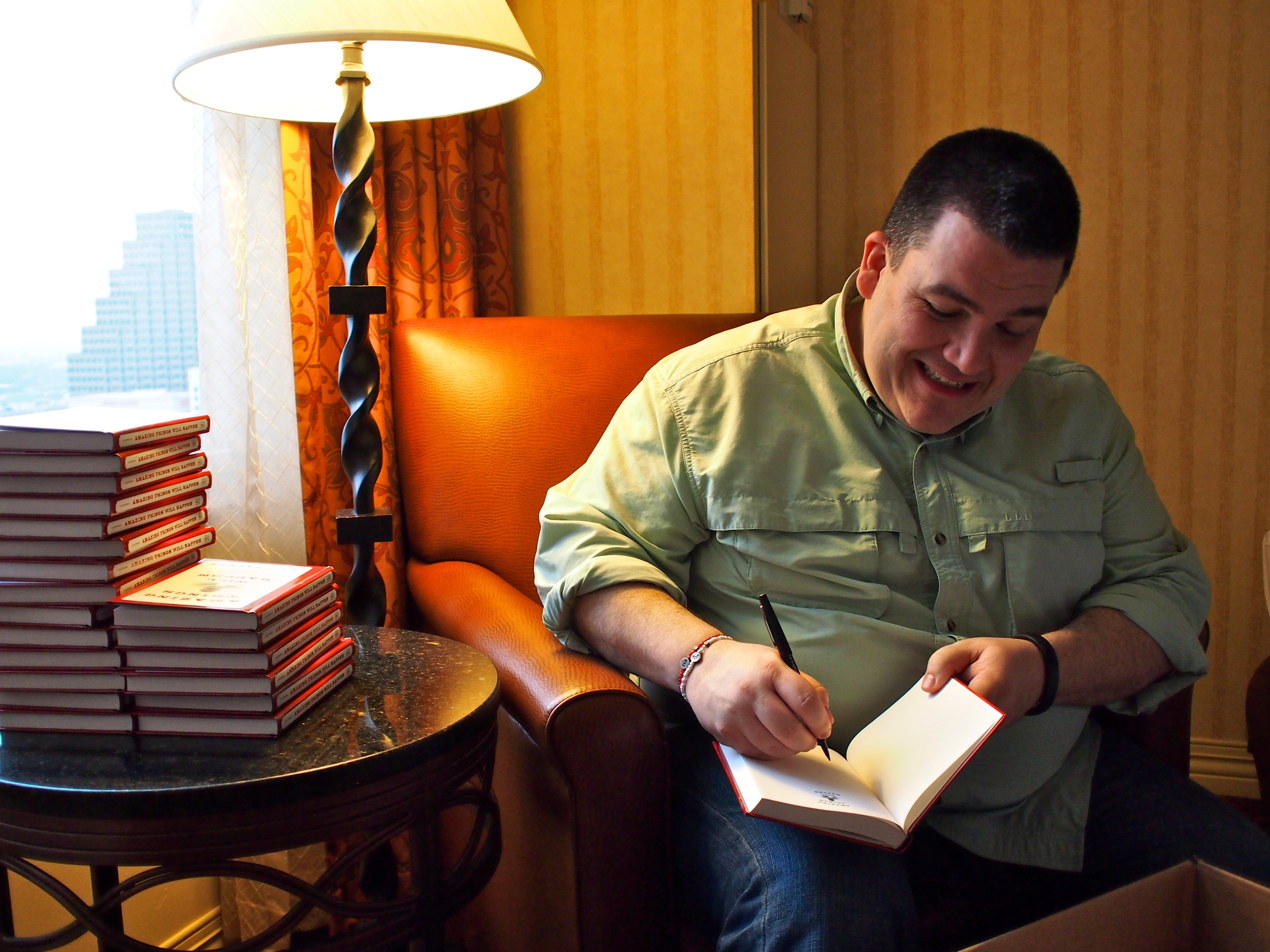
- C.C. Chapman signing books at South by Southwest 2013
- Born: New Hampshire, U.S.
- Education: Bentley University
- Occupations: Speaker, storyteller, author, marketing consultant, adjunct professor, visiting instructor
- Website: Official website

Charles "C.C." Chapman is an American author, marketing consultant, and speaker.

Chapman co-founded the company, The Advance Guard, which was acquired by in 2009. Since then, Chapman has been an independent consultant, event speaker, and wrote two books.

He was a visiting instructor of Business and Management at Wheaton College and the Program & Partnership Director for Wheaton Innovates with MassChallenge.

He's a member of the Aspen Institutes National Commission on Social, Emotional, and Academic Development: Parent Advisory Panel, on the board of The Hockey Foundation, part of the No Kid Hungry Social Council.

== Background ==
In 1996, just before graduating from Bentley University, Chapman co-founded an independent film production company, Random Foo Pictures, with Dan Gorgone. Chapman acted in, produced and directed a number of short films, including Inquisition. His experience marketing the group's projects led to his online promotion, networking, and sharing media online.

Chapman started his first blog in July 2001, his first podcast in December 2004, and opened a music cafe in the virtual world of Second Life in November 2006.

== Podcasting ==
From his home studio in the Boston area, Chapman began hosting the independent music-focused podcast Accident Hash in 2005 and the new media podcast Managing the Gray in 2006. During the summer of 2005, Hash was one of the first podcasts to be included in the iTunes Podcast directory and it became a featured podcast on PodShow. Accident Hash was later voted Best Podsafe Music Podcast at the 2006 Podcast Awards and was nominated again in 2009.

Chapman has also guest hosted Adam Curry's Podshow on the Sirius Stars channel and was a panelist on The BeanCast Marketing Podcast.

== Publications ==
- Content Rules: How to Create Killer Blogs, Podcasts, Videos, Ebooks, Webinars (and More) That Engage Customers and Ignite Your Business by Ann Handley and C.C. Chapman
- Amazing Things Will Happen: A Real-World Guide on Achieving Success and Happiness by C.C. Chapman

== Personal life ==
C.C. Chapman was born and raised in New Hampshire and lives in Massachusetts. He is married with two children.
