= Skyfox II: The Cygnus Conflict =

1987 video game

- Commodore 64 cover art
- Developer: Dynamix
- Publisher: Electronic Arts
- Designers: Kevin Ryan; Damon Slye; Jeff Tunnell
- Artists: John Burton; Dariusz Lukaszuk
- Composer: David Warhol
- Platforms: Commodore 64, Amiga, Atari ST, MS-DOS
- Release: 1987: C64; 1988: Amiga, MS-DOS; 1989: Atari ST
- Genre: Space combat simulator
- Mode: Single-player

Skyfox II: The Cygnus Conflict is a space combat computer game developed by Dynamix and published by Electronic Arts in 1987 for the Commodore 64 as a sequel to the original Skyfox for the Apple II. It was ported to the Amiga, Atari ST, and MS-DOS. The creator of Skyfox, Ray Tobey, was not involved in this game.

== Reception ==
Computer Gaming World stated that Skyfox II had good graphics, much action, and diverse and interesting weapons for fans of space-combat games. In a 1994 survey of wargames the magazine gave the title one-plus stars out of five. The game was reviewed in 1988 in Dragon #133 by Hartley, Patricia, and Kirk Lesser in "The Role of Computers" column. The reviewers gave the game 4 out of 5 stars.
