= Left Behind: Eternal Forces =

2006 video game

- Developer: Inspired Media Entertainment
- Publisher: Inspired Media Entertainment
- Composer: Chance Thomas
- Platform: Microsoft Windows
- Release: NA: November 7, 2006
- Genres: Real-time strategy, Christian
- Modes: Single-player, multiplayer

Left Behind: Eternal Forces is a Christian real-time strategy game developed and published by Inspired Media Entertainment (formerly Left Behind Games) for Microsoft Windows. It was released on November 7, 2006. The game is based on the evangelical Christian Left Behind series of novels.

== Gameplay ==
The game features a single-player campaign and an online multiplayer mode.

In the single-player campaign, the player controls the Tribulation Force, a Christian group in a post-Rapture New York City, who are combating the influence of the Global Community Peacekeepers, the world government led by the Antichrist Nicolae Carpathia. The player directs the actions of the main characters (Rayford Steele, Cameron "Buck" Williams, Chloe Steele, and Bruce Barnes) and the Tribulation Force's units in an effort to defeat the Global Community Peacekeepers by converting neutral and Global Community-allied civilians to their side and only using lethal force against the Antichrist's army forces when necessary. But the player's main goal is to use conversion rather than violence, only resorting to combat when necessary, since killing causes the "spirit level" of the player's units to drop. If the "spirit level" of a player's unit drops too low, the unit will turn neutral or defect to the GCP (Global Community Peacekeepers), which can cause the player to lose the game. In the multiplayer component of the game, up to eight players can compete online against each other in teams, with one team playing as the Tribulation Force and the other playing as the Global Community Peacekeepers.

== Development ==
The game cost between $3 million to $5 million to produce.

== Sequels ==
In December 2006, Left Behind Games announced an expansion pack for the original game, which was scheduled to be released on November 15, 2007. GameSpot news reported in an interview with CEO Troy Lyndon that Inspired Media Entertainment had signed a deal with Big Huge Games, creator of Rise of Nations (2003) and its spin-offs, in order to use the Rise of Nations engine to produce a sequel to Eternal Forces instead, titled Left Behind: Tribulation Forces. That sequel was released in April 2008, and features new graphical building enhancements, a new neutral faction (the American Militia Forces), five new missions, and two new maps. In May 2008, a version 1.05 update was released.

Left Behind 3: Rise of the Antichrist was released on October 25, 2010. Left Behind 4: World at War was released in November 2011.

== Reception ==
Reception

Aggregate score
Aggregator	Score
Metacritic	38/100

Review scores
Publication	Score
The A.V. Club	D
Computer Games Magazine	1.5/5
GameDaily	6/10
GameRevolution	F
GameSpot	3.4/10
GameSpy	2/5
IGN	5.9/10
PC Gamer (US)	37%
PC Zone	19%
X-Play	2/5

Eternal Forces received "unfavorable" reviews according to the review aggregation website Metacritic.

Though some reviewers praised the game for originality, many panned it claiming it had a ridiculous plot, mediocre gameplay, poor graphics and sound, and technical problems with the user interface, pathfinding, and A.I. In addition, many reviews criticized the game for allegedly promoting sexism, bigotry, and religious warfare, and the option to play on the side of the Antichrist in a Christian video game.

Reviewers of the game made note that several unit classes were restricted exclusively to male units and some claimed that it included racial stereotypes of Arabs and black people. GameSpot described this as part of a "1950s-style attitude" towards gender in the game, while PC Gamer described it as "the very definition of bigotry, or more specifically: misogyny."

Some reviews were more positive. IGN, Ars Technica and GameSpy disagreed that the game promoted "convert or kill"-style violence. While Wired criticized the game's exclusionary religious theme, it reviewed its gameplay more positively, saying, "The great surprise of Left Behind: Eternal Forces is that it actually kind of rocks. It's a classic real-time strategy game."

Inspired Media Entertainment addressed many of the game's technical issues in subsequent patches. Upon release, version 1.03 also added 2 more classes for 7 additional female units. GameShark reviewed an updated version of the game and gave it a C+.

== Controversy ==
Upon its release, Eternal Forces was subject to criticism from various watchdog groups claiming that it promoted religious warfare and bigotry. Disbarred attorney Jack Thompson, who had strongly criticized violence in other video games, was particularly displeased with the game. Thompson claimed "The game is about killing people for their lack of faith in Jesus," which he claimed made it incompatible with basic Christian doctrine, and subsequently broke his connections with Left Behind publisher Tyndale House.

A number of progressive Christian groups including the Beatitudes Society, Christian Alliance for Progress and The Center for Progressive Christianity opposed the game's release and called for a boycott or recall. The Christian Alliance for Progress decried it as "antithetical to the Gospel of Jesus Christ." Campaign to Defend the Constitution was also listed among critics and cited religious intolerance and violence as a large and objectionable part of the game.

American Atheists referred to it as "A violent Christian video game that promotes religious bigotry and intolerance."

The Anti-Defamation League criticized the game for what they called its "exclusivist religious system" against Jews. However, they also stated that the game avoided the level of violence found in the novels and that it was "an option only used by players if necessary when their forces are attacked by those hunting them, and any characters that kill others in the game are penalized". They went on to say that "Conversion to Christianity in the game is not depicted as forcible in nature, and violence is not rewarded in the game."

=== Legal threats ===
In October 2007, Left Behind Games sent letters to various bloggers demanding they remove "misleading" reviews of Eternal Forces from their blogs. The letters read in part:

...Your organization hosts a website that has information posted about this game. Unfortunately, there are many statements on your website which appear to be false and misleading. This type of misinformation may cause significant and irreparable harm to Left Behind Video Games Inc. and must be removed.

Left Behind Games Inc. generally supports free speech in the media and understands how important it is to have various opinions presented for public consumption. It will not, however, tolerate the publication of information regarding its products that is false or misleading. Left Behind Games Inc. is demanding that you immediately remove any and all information contained on your site about the above stated game that is false and/or misleading, including any such statements or commentary and the responses thereto. This includes posted comments made by others in the context of reading the incorrect or misleading statements.

If you do not comply immediately, the company will be forced to pursue additional legal action which will include claims for damages, costs of suit and attorney's fees. This may subject you and your organization to significant legal and financial damages.

== Commercial results ==
Eternal Forces was the first release of Left Behind Games, which has invested heavily in development and marketing. Results for the last quarter of 2006 showed sales of $2 million for the game.

Left Behind Games' public relations director stated:

The original game 'Eternal Forces' became one of the most highly publicized games of 2006, as politically motivated groups launched an all-out war against the game, by making false claims that the game included conversion to Christianity as a requirement or gave points for killing Muslims. The media frenzy resulted in feature stories on ABC, NBC, CBS, FOX NEWS, MSNBC, CNN, BBC, and numerous other worldwide networks and in print in the San Jose Chronicle, Newsweek, Wired and many others. After more than two years and a third-party investigation, it was determined that the Tides Center, a taxpayer supported non-profit, and others, launched and paid for a campaign to smear the game and Company, which may have resulted in a $200 million loss in shareholder value as the stock plummeted as a result of their misinformation campaign.

== Operation Straight Up care packages ==
In 2007, Operation Straight Up prepared to distribute care packages called "Freedom Packets" to the U.S. soldiers serving in Iraq as a part of the U.S. Department of Defense's America Supports You program. The packages were slated to include copies of Left Behind: Eternal Forces, which The Nation responded to by posting a blog entry claiming that the game included "kill or convert" violence against non-Christians and that characters shouted "Praise the Lord!" when non-Christians were killed. This prompted ABC News to contact the Department of Defense. As a result of this controversy, OSU dropped its plans to include the game in the care packages.

== "Million Games Giveaway" ==
In February 2008, Left Behind Games announced a giveaway of one million copies of Eternal Forces. The game was available either as a physical copy through the mail or as a download (requiring either a shipping and handling fee or digital download convenience fee).

== See also ==
- Christian video games
- Media violence
