= JCD =

JCD may refer to:

- Jatiyatabadi Chhatra Dal (born 1979), the student wing of the Bangladesh Nationalist Party
- John C. Dvorak (1946–2026), American writer, journalist, and podcaster
- Doctor of Canon Law, terminal degree within the Catholic Church (Latin: Juris Canonici Doctor)
