= Canal do Otário =

Brazilian YouTube channel and website

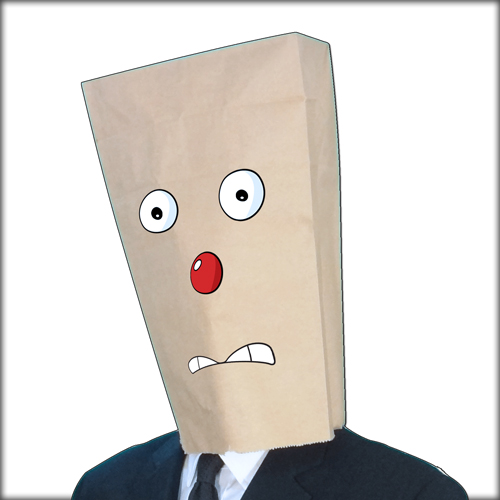
- Canal do Otário's main character: 'Otário Anonymous'
- Genre: Activism
- Language: Portuguese

Cast and voices
- Hosted by: Otário Anonymous

Publication
- Original release: 3 February 2012; 14 years ago

Related
- Website: canaldootario.com.br

CanalDoOtario
- Website type: Activism
- Available in: Portuguese
- Creator: Otário Anonymous
- Website: www.canaldootario.com.br
- Commercial: No
- Launched: August 29, 2012; 14 years ago
- Current status: Online

Canal do Otário (lit. Sucker's Channel) is a Brazilian YouTube channel and website, created on February 3, 2012, by an anonymous user, whose host is a popular internet figure in Brazil, going by the name of "Otário Anonymous”. Otário investigates false advertising and rants about it on YouTube with a paper bag over his head.

== Origin ==
The channel and website originated after the creator reported feeling cheated after buying a package of cookies that did not match the packaging, and feeling that everything around him was deceiving him.

== Anonymity ==
In an interview with The Wall Street Journal, Otário said he cherishes his anonymity to protect his ability to speak freely and to allow viewers of all demographics to relate to him. In addition to the paper bag on his head, he wears a suit and white gloves to cover his race and age. His speech is distorted into a high-pitch, Mickey Mouse-like voice.

During an interview with The Noite, hosted by Danilo Gentili on SBT, Otário said that his anonymity also helps him to stay safe from any threat to his security.

== Lawsuits ==
=== Bradesco ===
In one popular video, he warns Brazilian consumers about what he says are hidden fees when they invest in a Bradesco S/A mutual fund. "This is what they're doing", he says in the video, imitating an armed robber, firing a warning shot with his fingers and shoving a wad of cash into his pocket. Bradesco said the video was offensive and won a case against Google Inc. on 2012 to remove it from its YouTube platform. Google has not yet removed the video and has appealed the case to a federal court in São Paulo.

=== Correios ===
The video with criticisms about Brazilian Post and Telegraph Corporation (also known as Correios) was banned in Brazilian YouTube through a court order (though it still remains available on YouTube in other countries). The video compares rates in Brazil with other countries and criticizes the state monopoly in the postage sector. By Correios' request, the Brazilian court ordered Google Inc to delete some parts of the video that shows the company's logo, which claimed "improper use of trademark". The decision was taken in November 2013, however, it was only effectively fulfilled in June 2014, coincidentally after the start of the Brazilian Civil Rights Framework for the Internet. The state-owned company said it will also request the removal of the video on Vimeo, as was done in Google.

== Awards ==
- 2012 - Info Exame Magazine - Brazil, Editora Abril - "Perfil Geek of the Year"
- 2013 - YouTube, The Silver Play Button
- 2013 - Shorty Awards, Vox Populi Winner in Activism
- 2014 - Shorty Awards, Finalist in Activism
- 2015 - Shorty Awards, Finalist in Activist
- 2015 - Webby Award, Honoree for Online Film & Video / Public Service & Activism

== See also ==
- List of YouTube celebrities
