= Dvorak on Typing =

1991 video game

- Developers: Presage Software (Windows); Park Place Productions. Silicon & Synapse (Macintosh)
- Publisher: Interplay Productions
- Platforms: Windows; Macintosh; Amiga
- Release: 1991; 1992 (Macintosh)

Dvorak on Typing (DOT) is a 1991 typing video game from Presage Software. It uses three different instruction voices and teaches a variety of keyboard skills. The game is for ages 10 and up.

== Gameplay ==
Dvorak on Typing is a typing tutorial program that offers interactive lessons, speech prompts, and typing games to help users improve their skills. The program features an interface which guides users through exercises with digitized voice instructions. Players begin by taking a typing proficiency test to determine their skill level — beginner, intermediate, or advanced.

Key gameplay elements include:

- Typing drills with real-time feedback, where incorrect keystrokes are spoken aloud and highlighted.
- Dictation practice, allowing users to type along with digitized voices.
- Progress reports to track improvement.
- The Sword Fighting Game, where typing accuracy boosts the performance of a knight in battle.

The interface is simple and intuitive, requiring minimal effort to navigate. The program also supports the Dvorak keyboard layout, though users must enable it separately in Windows.

== Development ==
Dvorak on Typing was named after writer John C. Dvorak. An Amiga version was released in June 1991.

== Reception ==
Reception

Review score
Publication	Score
Macworld	2/5

The New York Times said "Dvorak on Typing is an entertaining and handsome program designed for both beginners and intermediate and advanced typists".
