= Operation Straight Up =

Evangelical organization

Operation Straight Up (OSU) was an evangelical organization that provides Christian-themed entertainment to the United States military. OSU operates under the United States Department of Defense's "America Supports You" program (though the DoD has no formal control over OSU's activities). It is led by former kickboxer Jonathan Spinks, and prominently features the actor Stephen Baldwin, along with various celebrities, professional athletes, and NASCAR drivers.

Controversy arose when in 2007 it was involved in a program to ship "freedom packages" that included Bibles and proselytizing material in English and Arabic, as well as the apocalyptic computer game Left Behind: Eternal Forces, to soldiers in Iraq. Especially controversial was the Left Behind game, which the ADL criticized for allegedly being exclusionary to other faiths and for allegedly promoting "convert or kill"-type violence against non-Christians in a post-Rapture world. After receiving controversial media coverage, OSU dropped its plans to include the game in the care packages.

According to its website (on pages since taken down), it planned an entertainment tour to Iraq called the "Military Crusade." "We feel the forces of heaven have encouraged us to perform multiple crusades that will sweep through this war torn region," read a page posted to the OSU website, "We'll hold the only religious crusade of its size in the dangerous land of Iraq."

The organization's 501(c)(3) charitable status was automatically revoked on 15 May 2014 due to failure to file a Form 990-series return or notice for three consecutive years.
