= ABC Monday Night Football (video game) =

1989 video game

- Developers: Park Place Productions; Monarch (Amiga); Data East (SNES)
- Publisher: Data East
- Designer: Scott Orr
- Platforms: Amiga, Commodore 64, MS-DOS, Super NES
- Release: MS-DOS: NA: December 1989; C64; 1990; Amiga; 1991; SNES; December 1993
- Genre: Sports
- Modes: Single-player, multiplayer

ABC Monday Night Football (ABCマンデーナイトフットボール, ABC Mande Naito Futtoboru) is an American football video game named after the television broadcast of the same name. It was published by Data East for MS-DOS (1989), Commodore 64 (1990), Amiga (1991), and Super NES (1993). The game was licensed by ABC Sports, but without NFL and NFLPA licenses, so the teams are fictional, such as the Indianapolis Rays and Miami Sharks. The team colors mimic their real-life counterparts.

== See also ==
- ABC Wide World of Sports Boxing
