= Super Slam Dunk =

1993 video game

- Cover art of North American version
- Developer: Park Place Productions
- Publisher: Virgin Games
- Producers: Donald W. Landon; Erik Yeo
- Programmers: Larry Garner; Donald W. Landon; Mike Waltman
- Composer: Michelle Simon
- Platform: Super NES
- Release: NA: July 1993; JP: July 16, 1993
- Genre: Traditional basketball simulation
- Modes: Single-player; Multiplayer

Super Slam Dunk, known in its entirety as Earvin "Magic" Johnson's Super Slam Dunk, is a Super Nintendo Entertainment System basketball video game endorsed by Magic Johnson and released in 1993.

== Gameplay ==
A game between fictionalized versions of the Los Angeles Lakers and Boston Celtics

The game features 27 fictionalized versions of real-life NBA franchises in addition to an all-star team. There is an exhibition and a playoffs mode. Magic Johnson gives pre-game insights of the teams, while Chick Hearn commentates on the game play-by-play.

A view of the basketball court from half court is available featuring isometric graphics. Players can choose to turn fouls on or off and how many minutes that each quarter will be; this can be changed between two minutes and a full-fledged 12 minutes.

== Reception ==
Allgame gave Super Slam Dunk a rating of 2.5 stars out of a possible 5 in their overview.
