= Dick Vitale's "Awesome, Baby!" College Hoops =

1994 basketball video game

- Cover art showing Dick Vitale in front of a basketball court
- Developer: Time Warner Interactive
- Publisher: Time Warner Interactive
- Director: Richard Seaborne
- Producers: Mitzi McGilvray; Bill Hindorff
- Programmers: Michael Alexander; Richard Seaborne; Charles Tolman
- Artists: Jose Erazo; Doug Gray; Jules Marino
- Composers: Earl Vickers; Doug Brandon
- Platform: Sega Genesis
- Release: NA: 1994
- Genre: Sports
- Modes: Single-player, multiplayer

Dick Vitale's "Awesome, Baby!" College Hoops is a 1994 college basketball sports game developed and published by Time Warner Interactive. It was released for the Sega Genesis in 1994. Directed by Richard Seaborne, the game features the voice and likeness of the basketball sportscaster Dick Vitale and prominently features his quotes and catchphrases. Players play as multiple college basketball teams from the United States in a 3D court that automatically rotates to fit to the player's position, which was a major selling point for the game.

Dick Vitale's "Awesome, Baby!" College Hoops received generally positive reviews from critics. The game's graphics and self-rotating court was praised, with GameFan calling the game a "technical marvel". Critics were more negative towards the game's soundtrack and sound effects; GamePro called the soundtrack "terrible" and stated that players would either "love" or "hate" Vitale's commentary.

== Gameplay ==
California going against Tennessee

Dick Vitale's "Awesome, Baby!" College Hoops is a basketball sports game and sees players playing as different college basketball teams from the United States. (Note: Most teams aren't named after actual colleges due to the game not being licensed by the NCAA, nor any colleges.) The game is similar to the basketball sport and is played in a self-rotating 3D court and is divided into three main modes: Tournament, 2-on-2, and Single. In the tournament mode, the player goes against other teams in a tournament; in the 2-on-2 mode, players compete in a basketball 2-on-2; in the single mode, the player competes in a single game of basketball. Players can get coached by Vitale if they select the "View Plays" option. A time-out can be called by pressing the start, A, and B buttons simultaneously. Players can also force a foul play by mashing the A and C buttons. The game also has a practice mode, where players can "learn the ropes" of the game.

Gameplay will be altered depending on the player's settings; the game has six speed and three difficulty settings. Matches will speed-up if the graphic detail is set to low. In the options menu, players can also turn off Vitale's commentary.

== Development ==
Dick Vitale's "Awesome, Baby!" College Hoops was developed by Time Warner Interactive. Development is likely to have begun prior to June 28, 1994, as the game's commercial refers to its developer as Tengen, Time Warner Interactive's name prior to Tengen being acquired by Time Warner. The game was directed by Richard Seaborne; produced by Mitzi McGilvary and Bill Hindorff; designed by Jose Erazo, Doug Gray, and Jules Marino; programmed by Michael Alexander, Seaborne, and Charles Tolman, and composed by Earl Vickers and Doug Brandon. The game was developed solely through the Sega Genesis software; however, it still managed to achieve scaling and rotation.

== Marketing and release ==
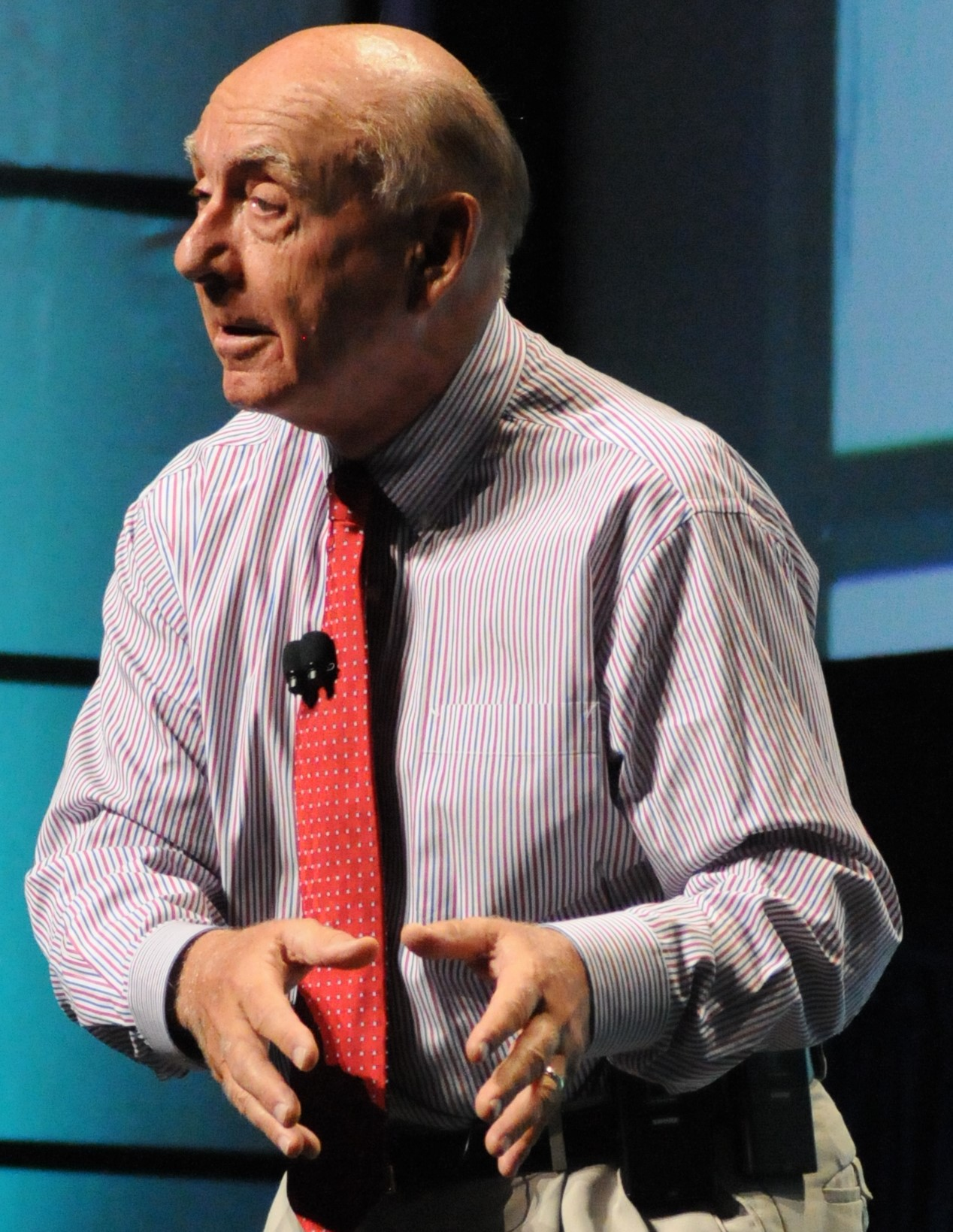
Vitale at the Refresh Leadership Live Simulcast in 2014

Advertisements for the game were included in multiple video game magazines from 1994 to 1995, such as the 21st issue of Sega Visions, the 66th issue of GamePro, and the 5th issue of EGM2. The game's self-rotating 3D court was a key marketing point for Dick Vitale's "Awesome, Baby!" College Hoops, with it appearing in adverts and the game's commercial. In an advert on an issue of GamePro, Vitale stated that he was "proud" to have his likeness in the game due to it being very similar to actual college basketball. Time Warner Interactive also released a commercial to promote the game.

Dick Vitale's "Awesome, Baby!" College Hoops later released in late 1994, which is indicated by the timeframe of when it was actively covered in video game magazines.

== Reception ==
Reception

Review scores
Publication	Score
AllGame	3/5
GameFan	82/100
GamePro	14/20
Sega Visions	3/5

Dick Vitale's "Awesome, Baby!" College Hoops was generally received positively by critics; the game's graphics and self-rotating court was described as "colorful, high-res, and smooth". GameFan called the game a "technical marvel in more ways than one" and called the basketball players in the game "well-animated". Critics criticized the game's soundtrack, with Sega Visions rating it 2/5. Critics compared the game to the NCAA Football series and NCAA Basketball for the Super NES. AllGame compared the game to College Slam and Coach K College Basketball, two other college basketball games for the Sega Genesis.

The game's gameplay was described as "fun" and "unique" by Sega Visions; GameFan felt that the game's play mechanics were basic, but stated that he felt that the game was "attractive" to him due to the developers being "willing to take some chances", which made the game more "sophisticated". GamePro felt that the game "scores high" in its amount of content.

The game's sound was highly criticized by critics and was described as "awful". Vitale's commentary received mixed reception; GameFan was positive to it, while GamePro felt that players would eventually grow annoyed at the commentary, and suggested that people should eventually turn it off in the options menu.

Aaron Thomas of VentureBeat was critical towards the game's box art, ironically stating that it is "quite possible [that Time Warner Interactive] used scissors and tape" to make it. In 2011, Game Informer's Jeff Marchiafava listed Dick Vitale's "Awesome, Baby!" College Hoops as one of the weirdest video games based around celebrities.
