= NHL Hockey =

1991 video game

- North American cover art featuring Glenn Healy and 8 team logos from the 1990–91 NHL season
- Developer: Park Place Productions
- Publishers: NA/EU: Electronic Arts; JP: Electronic Arts Victor
- Producers: Richard Hilleman; Michael Brook; Ed Gwynn
- Designers: Scott Orr; Richard Hilleman; Michael Brook; Jim Simmons
- Programmer: Jim Simmons
- Composer: Rob Hubbard
- Series: NHL
- Platform: Genesis/Mega Drive
- Release: NA/EU: August 1991; JP: November 20, 1992
- Genre: Sports (ice hockey)
- Modes: Single-player, multiplayer

NHL Hockey is an ice hockey video game developed by Park Place Productions and published by Electronic Arts. Released in the summer of 1991 exclusively for the Sega Genesis/Mega Drive, the game allows one to two players to play action-oriented hockey matches that include events such as fighting, power plays, and penalties. Officially licensed by the National Hockey League, NHL Hockey features the teams from the 1990–91 NHL season. It was released in Europe as EA Hockey and in Japan as Professional Hockey, (Note: Japanese: プロホッケー, Hepburn: Puro Hokkee; lit. 'Pro Hockey') with country-based teams due to the lack of a worldwide league license.

As part of Electronic Arts' push to release console games for the Sega Genesis, the development team included several members of the group who created the 1990 game John Madden Football. The team aimed to replicate the general concepts that made their football game successful. While they did not have access to the NHL players' likeness, the developers based the virtual players on real life players' skills and identified them by their respective jersey numbers.

NHL Hockey received critical acclaim both from contemporary video game publications and in retrospective commentaries. Critics lauded the game's action and variety of options, as well as the realism of the title's presentation. The success led to immediate sequels, spawning the NHL series, which has become one of Electronic Arts's long-running franchises.

== Gameplay ==
Gameplay, which is viewed top-down, begins with a face-off between the two competing NHL hockey teams. Match statistics are displayed at the bottom of the screen while a closeup side-view animation of the face-off appears in the top right corner.

NHL Hockey is an adaptation of professional ice hockey played from a top-down perspective, featuring all the teams from the 1990–91 NHL season. Outside North America, the game features 22 teams from countries around the world like the United States, the Soviet Union, and Spain. Before starting a match, players must select options such as gameplay mode, number of players, teams, length of the periods, and how penalties are called by referees. In addition to single player gameplay, NHL Hockey allows a second player to compete against the first player or assist them on the same team.

Players control a single hockey player at a time marked by a star icon at their feet, while the goaltenders are controlled by the game. Players can skate, pass the hockey puck, and make a shot at the opposing goal net. Shots can be either slow or quick depending on the length of time the player holds the shot button. Each hockey player has different gameplay statistics that give them a variety of strengths and weaknesses, collectively giving the various teams advantages and weaknesses. Like its real-life counterpart, NHL Hockey features face-offs, power plays, line changes, and fighting. If enabled, penalties can include tripping the puck carrier, hooking another player with a stick, and cross-checking another player. Players can also initiate an instant replay, which will show the last 10 seconds of gameplay and provide playback controls.

== Development ==
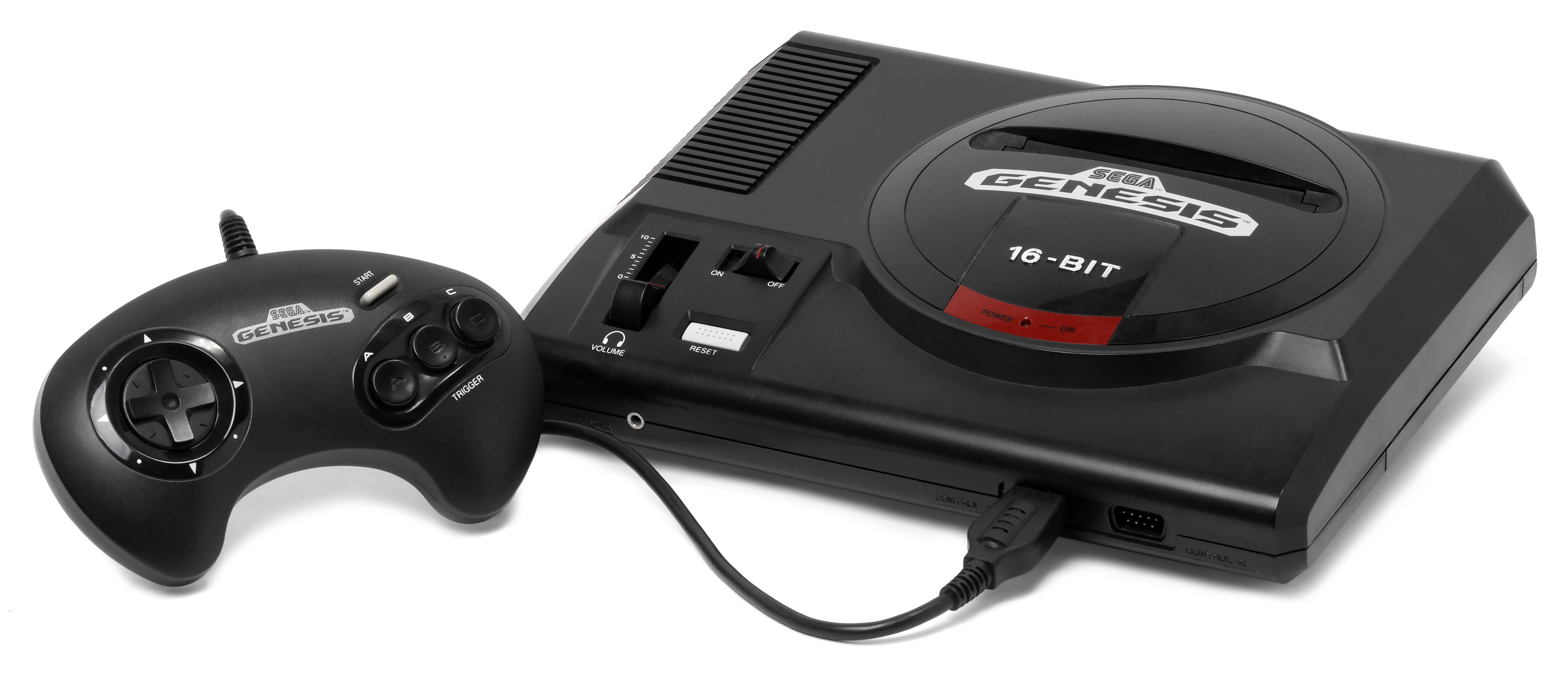
NHL Hockey was released exclusively on the Sega Genesis console, known as the Mega Drive outside North America. Soon after Sega had launched the console, Electronic Arts committed to supporting the platform as part of its shift to produce consoles games.

NHL Hockey was developed by Park Place Productions, whose first Sega Genesis game in 1990, John Madden Football, had become a great success on the console. Electronic Arts had switched its focus from PC games to console games in 1989, specifically on the newly released Sega Genesis. Electronic Arts began developing and publishing numerous games for the system after signing a deal with Sega. After the success of John Madden Football, the company aimed to convert the concepts from the football game into a hockey game. The developers sought to include as many features into the hockey game as possible, and if the game was also a success, continue to build on those in sequels.

Producer and designer Michael Brook, who worked on John Madden Football, wanted the hockey game to have the official licensing from both the National Hockey League and National Hockey League Players' Association. At the time, Time Warner handled the licensing for both hockey organizations and prohibited direct negotiating. Ultimately, Electronic Arts was able to secure only the league license. Time Warner's joint licensing agent told Brook that the NHLPA had problems that prohibited a deal, but the NHL was happy to sign a deal. Brook later learned that Time Warner had rejected the NHLPA license request without approaching the Player's Association.

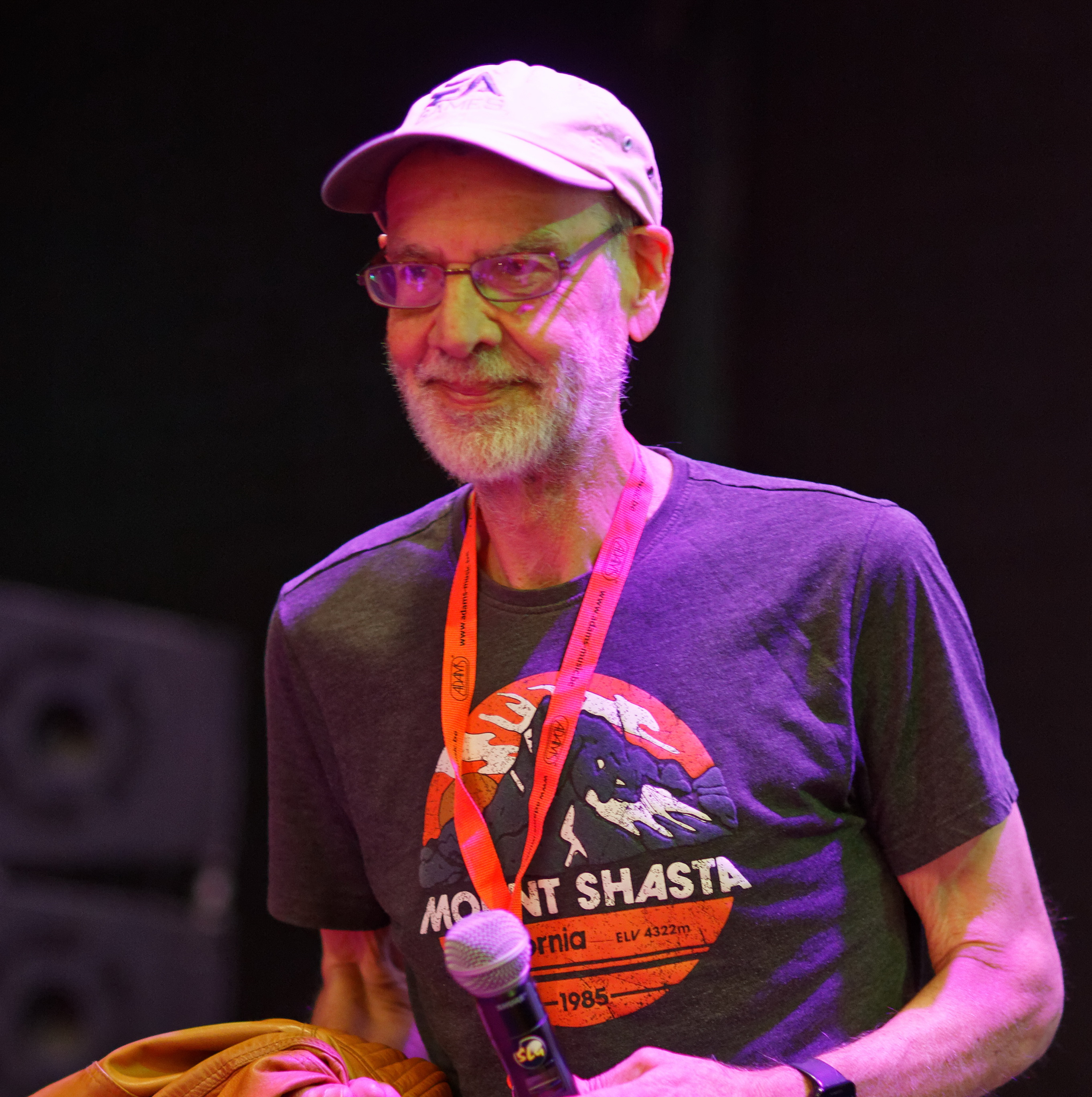
Rob Hubbard (shown in 2023) composed NHL Hockey's audio, which was praised by video gaming press.

In addition to Brook, many of the other John Madden Football developers worked on NHL Hockey. Jim Simmons returned as the programmer. Composer Rob Hubbard again handled the game's music and sound effects. A fan of Philadelphia's Broad Street Bullies in the 1970s, Brook wanted to incorporate their aggressive style of hockey into the game. Despite not having the NHLPA license, the development team based the virtual hockey players on real life players from the 1990–91 NHL season and aimed to replicate their individual strengths and weaknesses. The newly acquired league license allowed Park Place to use only the NHL team names and logos in the game. Instead of player names, the developers simply referred to the hockey players by their jersey number. For example, No. 99 on the Los Angeles Kings emulated Wayne Gretzky's abilities and skill levels.

== Promotion and release ==
To promote NHL Hockey, Park Place set up the game in the newsroom at the 1991 Stanley Cup Final for people to play. After discovering the fighting mechanic, reporters had hockey players like No. 99 getting into fights, which caught the attention of NHL executives, including then NHL president, John Ziegler Jr. After the Finals, the NHL contacted Brook to remove the fighting gameplay. However, as NHL Hockey had already been approved and the game cartridges were ready to ship to stores, the mechanic remained in the game, but the NHL requested it be absent from future games. The game was also showcased at the Summer 1991 Consumer Electronics Show in Chicago along with many other Sega titles.

The game was released in North America exclusively for the Sega Genesis in August 1991, with Los Angeles Kings goaltender Glenn Healy on the cover art. It was released in Europe that same month as EA Hockey, using different names and teams due to Electronic Arts not having the worldwide rights to the NHL teams' likeness. The localization, which included re-configuring certain parts of the game and creating new packing, was handled by a regional office that Electronic Arts operated in the United Kingdom. It was later released in Japan under the name Professional Hockey by Electronic Arts Victor, a joint-venture between Electronic Arts and Victor Entertainment, on November 20, 1992.

A special two-pack version titled EA Sports Double Header that included John Madden Football was also released in the United Kingdom. EA Sports Double Header was later re-released in another two-pack game with Lotus II: R.E.C.S. in Europe. In 2004, Jakks Pacific released NHL Hockey and Madden NFL '95 together as a plug-and-play TV Game. The device emulates the Sega Genesis games with contemporary jersey numbers for the players.

== Reception ==
Reception

Review scores
Publication	Score
ACE	949/1000
Game Informer	9/10
Raze	90/100
MegaTech	92%
Mean Machines	95%

Awards
Publication	Award
Electronic Gaming Monthly	Best Sports Game (1991)
Power Play	Best Genesis Game (1991)

NHL Hockey was met with acclaim by contemporary video game publications. Game Informer's reviewers, Andy McNamara and Rick Petzolt, both praised several aspects of the game. McNamara lauded the available options, the multiplayer modes, and the visuals. He summarized his comments by stating that NHL Hockey alone was worth purchasing a Sega Genesis. Petzolt echoed similar comments about the graphical details. In rating the audio, he extolled the realism and sound effects. Conversely, McNamara rated the audio lower, calling the sounds "realistic enough". Both commented that while the game's action could be a little slow, it was nonetheless entertaining. Julian Rignall and Richard Leadbetter, Mean Machines's review staff, also lauded many features such as the gameplay options, audio-visuals, and replayability. They praised the atmosphere created by the music and sound effects, calling them "awesome" and realistic, respectively. The two described the game sprites as "stunningly detailed" and summed up their review as "simply stunning", urging readers to purchase it immediately.

The review staff of MegaTech magazine praised the game's replay value, calling it a "superb sports simulation" and one of the best available. Writing for ACE magazine, Rignall again complimented the game, calling it an "essential purchase" for Sega Genesis owners. He commented that NHL Hockey was one of the few sports games that could be called a classic, citing its ease of play and replay value. Julian Broadman of Raze magazine praised many features such as the instant replay function, simple controls, graphical presentation, Hubbard's audio work, and overall accessibility.

The game has received a positive retrospective reception years after its release as well. In 1995, Maximum: The Video Game Magazine staff referred to NHL Hockey as a "benchmark title" and an "instant classic" on the console. They praised the game's action, particularly the hockey fights. The staff further praised the game's success in the United Kingdom despite ice hockey's relatively obscurity there. Bob Borgen, the Los Angeles Kings television producer during the 1990s, called the game's release "groundbreaking" and praised its artificial intelligence in 2018. In 2003, developer Dave Warfield called NHL Hockey the "first truly authentic hockey game for the [Sega Genesis]" and said he was an instant fan when it first released. He praised the combination of realism and "pick-up-and-play" action. Warfield further noted that despite hockey having a smaller viewership than other major sports, NHL Hockey's "fast and furious" gameplay captured non-hockey fans' attention. Former Electronic Arts executive Bing Gordon echoed similar comments in 2015, stating that people who never watched hockey on TV were buying the game.

NHL Hockey also garnered awards and distinctions from media publications. Electronic Gaming Monthly awarded it "Best Sports Game" of 1991, and German magazine Power Play named it the "Best Genesis Game" of 1991. In 1992, Mega magazine placed the game second on their list of "Top Mega Drive Games of All Time". The BBC Sport staff listed NHL Hockey among the "50 Sport Video Games that shaped [their] lives" in 2020, citing its physics on ice, audio, penalties, and gameplay options, summarizing that the game is still playable decades after its release. In 2006, IGN included two hockey players from NHL Hockey in its list of "Top 25 Cyber Athletes of All-Time: Hockey". Ray Bourque was ranked 21 for his defense whereas Gary Roberts was ranked 22 because of his maneuverability and shooting accuracy.

== Legacy ==
After NHL Hockey's success, Electronic Arts released sequels the following years. The company released NHLPA Hockey '93 in 1992 and NHL '94 in 1993 for the Sega Genesis, starting one of Electronic Arts' best selling franchises on the console. Jeffery Fleming of Game Developer noted that over six years of the console's lifespan, Electronic Arts was able to establish NHL Hockey as one of its many long-running franchises; the series has continued for decades. Retro Gamer magazine staff noted that while other companies released sports games, Electronic Arts' inclusion of current rosters and official endorsements gave them a significant edge over competitors. Patrick Hickey Jr. described Brook as a "founding member of the EA Sports brand" and a "pioneer" for his work on the company's early sports console games in the 1990s. He noted that Brook was a prominent advocate in Electronic Arts for yearly releases to reflect new seasons and influenced the publisher's NHL and Madden series.

After the NHL told Park Place that they had to remove fighting from sequels, Brook decided to forego the league license for their next game, NHLPA Hockey '93, in order to keep the gameplay mechanism. Brook was aware that the NHL and NHLPA had a bitter relationship and decided to approach the NHLPA directly rather than go through Time Warner again. After speaking with the NHLPA's head of licensing, Ted Saskin, and director, Bob Goodenow, Brook was able to secure the player license for the sequel. During the negotiation, the NHLPA learned that Time Warner had excluded them from the licensing opportunity of the first game, which was part of a pattern of actions that led the Player's Association to strike against the league in 1992. When designing NHL 2004, Warfield stated that the development team revisited past games in the franchise to "better understand where hockey games have been and where they're going." As a result of NHL Hockey's popular gameplay, Warfield had his team focus on the three button gameplay from the series' Genesis games, calling the "shoot, pass, hit" actions the "core of the gameplay experience" that they wanted to replicate.
