= Kawasaki Caribbean Challenge =

1993 video game

- Cover art
- Developer: Park Place Productions
- Publisher: GameTek
- Designer: Rod Humble
- Platform: Super NES
- Release: NA: June 1993
- Genre: Racing with top-down perspective
- Modes: Single-player, multiplayer

Kawasaki Caribbean Challenge is a Super NES racing game released in 1993, exclusively for the North American market.

== Gameplay ==
Either one or two players can race using six different Kawasaki vehicles on track set across three different Caribbean islands. Players must finish five laps and place first in order to be credited with a win.

The race tracks feature numerous treacherous curves and bends, challenging players to maintain control as they compete for victory and the top spot.

== See also ==
- Kawasaki Superbike Challenge
