= Park Place Productions =

American video game developer

- Type: Private
- Industry: Video games
- Predecessor: Pacific Dataworks International
- Founded: 1989; 37 years ago
- Founder: Michael Knox; Troy Lyndon
- Defunct: 1994
- Fate: Bankruptcy
- Successor: Sony Imagesoft
- Number of employees: 130 (1993)
- Divisions: Spirit of Discovery; Bug Busters; Sports Forum

Park Place Productions was a corporation founded in 1989 by Michael Knox, Troy Lyndon and Stephen Quinn.

== History ==
The company's predecessor was Pacific Dataworks International (originally Lyndon & Associates before it was incorporated in May 1987, other names considered include Discovery Software, which was rejected due to the similarity of the game publisher Discovery Software International, and Grey Matter), a company co-founded by Troy Lyndon and Christopher Riggs in 1987 to develop work for Capcom, after Lyndon leaving Gamestar. Michael Knox had also worked for Pacific Dataworks International as well.

The company broke up in 1989, as Lyndon and Knox formed Park Place Productions (initially operating with the Pacific Dataworks name before settling on Park Place) and Riggs formed Riggs International (later Radiance Software) to develop its first game for Capcom, Pocket Rockets, and went on to work for TurboGrafx-16 and other platforms, such as the TurboGrafx-16 versions of Hyper Dyne Side Arms, TaleSpin and Darkwing Duck, the multiplatform title The Great Waldo Search, the NES game Rollerblade Racer and the SNES version of Andre Agassi Tennis, and evolved into Enigma Interactive in 1993, which was later sold to Beachport Entertainment Group, to develop the Sega Genesis game Popeye in High Seas High-Jinks. James Haldy, who worked for Pacific Dataworks, and subsequently worked for Park Place, later left to start his own company to produce a Jonny Quest game for MicroIllusions, but never materialized.

The company's first product under the name was ABC Monday Night Football for home computers in a deal with Data East, through a design deal with Season Ticket Productions, a compamy founded by Scott Orr of Gamestar.

In 1990, contracted by Electronic Arts, the company produced John Madden Football for the Genesis video game console, described as "the most successful sports game of all time." Other popular titles that the company developed include Monday Night Football (DOS, 1989), and Muhammad Ali Heavyweight Boxing (Genesis, 1992). In 1991, the company made a major setback when Jim Simmons, who was with Pacific Dataworks and Park Place, left the company for Electronic Arts under the development company Digital Arts. The company later acquired Knight Technologies. Park Place Productions went on to become the largest independent developer of computer games in 1993 with 130 developers making 45 games for 14 video game publishing companies. The company owned a testing company, Bug Busters, which handled testing of its games. The company later launched a publishing label, Spirit of Discovery, used to publish games, supervised by Knox, and spun off in 1994. In 1993, the company launched a publishing sports label, Sports Forum, meant to publish games.

At the end of December 1993 the company collapsed. Co-founder Troy Lyndon had left two months earlier to start Studio Arts Multimedia. Jack Thornton had also left the company to form CetaSoft. After milestones for some of the projects hadn't been met, publishers denied further payments, which worsened the situation. One large customer that accounted for 30% of business, decided to pull out of its contracts. This led to a chain reaction with other business partners dropping their projects. Park Place Productions could not pay its employees in December 1993. Before the end of December 1993, a group of 30 employees started to work for a newly established operation of Sony Imagesoft based in San Diego's Sorrento Valley. Park Place Productions subsequently opened a lawsuit against Sony, alleging that these employees were acquired in a hostile takeover and took with them hardware, software, and proprietary source codes from Park Place. During the implosion, Acclaim handed off development of NFL Quarterback Club to Iguana Entertainment and Lennox Lewis Boxing to Software Creations of America, which was later renamed to Foreman for Real, Tengen hired its internal development team to do Dick Vitale's "Awesome, Baby!" College Hoops, Sony Imagesoft hired Ringler Studios and Absolute Entertainment to do ESPN Sunday Night NFL, and RazorSoft hired Glen Volk to do a new version of Pigskin Footbrawl for the SNES, while GameTek removed its logo from the Genesis version of Jeopardy! Sports Edition. The company attempted to rebuild with a smaller staff, but subsequently went bust in 1994. Donald W. Landon subsequently joined Ocean of America.

On 15 September 2009, co-founder Michael Knox died in Kaneohe, Hawaii of colon cancer. He was 48.

== Games ==
This included games by the company's predecessor, Lyndon & Associates/Pacific Dataworks International.

Year	Title	Publisher	Platform
Lyndon & Associates/Pacific Dataworks International
1987	Defender of the Crown	Cinemaware	Commodore 64
1987	Gun.Smoke	Capcom	Commodore 64
1987	The Speed Rumbler	Capcom	Commodore 64
1987	Hyper Dyne Side Arms	Capcom	Commodore 64, IBM PC
1987	Hat Trick	Capcom	Commodore 64, IBM PC
1987	Mini Golf	Capcom	Commodore 64
1988	Street Fighter	Capcom	Commodore 64
1988	Stocker	Capcom	Commodore 64
1988	Bionic Commando	Capcom	Commodore 64, IBM PC
1988	Trojan	Capcom	IBM PC
1988	Street Football	Capcom	IBM PC
1988	Ghosts 'n Goblins	Capcom	IBM PC
1988	Designasaurus	Britannica Software	Commodore 64
1988	Sinbad and the Throne of the Falcon	Cinemaware	Commodore 64
1989	Cosmic Soldier: Psychic War	Kyodai	IBM PC
Unreleased	1942	Capcom	Commodore 64
Unreleased	Black Tiger	Capcom	Commodore 64
Unreleased	Sarge	Capcom	Commodore 64
Unreleased	Strider	Capcom	Commodore 64
Unreleased	Tiger Road	Capcom	Commodore 64
Unreleased	Street Fighter	Capcom	NES
Unreleased	Jonny Quest and the Splinter of Heaven	MicroIllusions	Commodore 64, DOS
Park Place Productions
1989	ABC Monday Night Football	Data East	Commodore 64, DOS
1990	The Berenstain Bears Learn About Counting	Britannica Software	DOS
1990	John Madden Football	Electronic Arts	Sega Genesis, SNES
1990	Joe Montana Football	Sega	Sega Genesis
1991	The Chessmaster	Hi-Tech Expressions	Game Boy
1991	The Dream Team: 3 on 3 Challenge	Data East	Commodore 64, DOS
1991	Bo Jackson Baseball (Tandy)	Data East	DOS
1991	NHL Hockey	Electronic Arts	Sega Genesis
1991	Dvorak on Typing	Interplay	DOS
1992	Roundbal: 2 on 2 Challenge	Mindscape	NES
1992	NHLPA Hockey '93	Electronic Arts	SNES
1992	Muhammad Ali Heavyweight Boxing	Virgin Games	Sega Genesis
1992	Facts in Action	Spirit of Discovery	DOS
1992	Beat the House	Spirit of Discovery	DOS
1992	Batman Returns	Konami	DOS
1993	NFL Pro Video Football	Konami	DOS
1993	NFL Football	Konami	SNES
1993	Kawasaki Caribbean Challenge	GameTek	SNES
1993	Super Slam Dunk	Virgin Games	SNES
1993	The Human Calculator	Compton's NewMedia	DOS
1993	Jeopardy!	GameTek	Sega Genesis
1993	NFL's Greatest: San Francisco vs. Dallas 1978-1993	Sega	Sega CD
1994	Jeopardy! Deluxe Edition	GameTek	Sega Genesis, DOS
1994	Wheel of Fortune Deluxe Edition	GameTek	DOS
1994	Champions World Class Soccer	Acclaim Entertainment	Sega Genesis, SNES
1994	ESPN Baseball Tonight	Sony Imagesoft	Sega Genesis, SNES
Unreleased	Galles Indy Extreme	Sports Forum	Windows 3.1
Unreleased	Pigskin Footbrawl	RazorSoft	SNES
Unreleased	Muhammad Ali Heavyweight Boxing	Virgin Games	SNES
Unreleased	Offroad Racin'	N/A	Sega Genesis
Unreleased	Wings	N/A	Sega Genesis
Unreleased	Dick Vitale's "Awesome, Baby!" College Hoops	Tengen	Sega Genesis
Unreleased	Lennox Lewis Boxing	Acclaim Entertainment	Sega Genesis
Unreleased	NFL Quarterback Club	Acclaim Entertainment	Sega Genesis, SNES
Unreleased	Lobo	Ocean Software	Sega Genesis, SNES
Unreleased	Dan Marino's Power Play Football	Virgin Games	Sega Genesis, SNES
Unreleased	Road to the Cup Hockey '94	Electro Brain	Sega Genesis, SNES
Unreleased	Kung Fu: The Legend Continues	Sunsoft	Sega Genesis, SNES, Sega CD
Unreleased	3D Adventures	Spirit of Discovery	3DO
Unreleased	3D Basketball	Sports Forum	3DO
Unreleased	3D Racing	Sports Forum	3DO
Unreleased	3D Football	Sports Forum	3DO, Atari Jaguar
Unreleased	David Robinson NBA Action	Spectrum HoloByte	DOS
Unreleased	Toaster Football	Hasbro	Toaster/Rush
