= Budokan: The Martial Spirit =

1989 video game

- Developer: Electronic Arts
- Publisher: Electronic Arts
- Producer: Don Traeger
- Designer: Michael Kosaka
- Programmer: Ray Tobey
- Composer: Rob Hubbard
- Platforms: MS-DOS, Amiga, Genesis, Commodore 64, ZX Spectrum, Amstrad CPC
- Release: 1989: Amiga, MS-DOS; Genesis: NA: June 1990; EU: November 1990; 1991: C64, Amstrad, Spectrum
- Genre: Fighting
- Modes: Single-player, multiplayer

Budokan: The Martial Spirit is a fighting game published by Electronic Arts in 1989 for the Amiga and MS-DOS compatible operating systems. The game pits the player against other martial artists in a tournament known as the Budokan at the Nippon Budokan in Tokyo. A port for the Sega Genesis was released in 1990, followed by Commodore 64, ZX Spectrum, and Amstrad CPC releasing in 1991.

== Gameplay ==
The player begins the game as an apprentice in the Tobiko-Ryu Dojo, and initially practices skills in four dojos, either Shadow Fighting (Jiyu-renshu) or sparring with an instructor (Kumite). The weapons and combat methods available to the player consist of:

1. Bo: classic Japanese long staff
2. Karate: Okinawan unarmed combat
3. Kendo: Japanese fencing utilizing a wooden sword
4. Nunchaku: swinging weapon with two shafts connected by a chain

Once the player is confident in their skills, they can go to the Free Spar mat to engage a human or computer opponent, or enter the Budokan tournament where the player faces consecutive opponents equipped with various weapons or combat forms (including, but not limited to, those available to the player). During the tournament the difficulty gradually increases, with each opponent demonstrating increasing prowess when compared to the previous. Most opponents are male, except for one female armed with a naginata. The gender of a ninjutsu opponent with a masked face is presumably female, as they are named Ayako.

Each match is preceded by a briefing screen which provides the player with a short description of the upcoming opponent. The player chooses a weapon to use in the match; however, each weapon or combat form may only be used a maximum of four times, requiring strategic choices in order to fight effectively. After three consecutive losses to the same opponent, the player must face the previous one again. The game ends if the player loses three times to the first opponent or runs out of weapons.

There are two primary attributes shown on the screen -- stamina and ki, the power of each blow. Active movements like jumping and delivering difficult blows decrease the ki, while blocking attacks increases it. As a fighter's stamina decreases, movements slow down, making it more difficult to act. The first fighter whose stamina is completely exhausted loses the match.

== Reception ==
Reception

Review scores
Publication	Score
AllGame	2.5/5 (PC); 2/5 (Genesis)
Dragon	4/5 (C64)
Mega Action	75% (Genesis)
Console XS	66/100 (Genesis)
MegaTech	89% (Genesis)

The game was reviewed in 1990 in Dragon #161 by Hartley, Patricia, and Kirk Lesser in "The Role of Computers" column. The reviewers gave the game 4 out of 5 stars. Console XS praised the Sega Genesis version having a terrific atmosphere although criticizing Budokan for being a "shallow beat-‘em-up with few opponents and limited moves." MegaTech described Budokan as a "Thinking man’s beat-‘em-up" and praised the graphics and sound.

== Legacy ==
In August 2006, GameSpot reported that Electronic Arts would be porting the Genesis version of Budokan to the PlayStation Portable as part of EA Replay.
