= Roundball: 2 on 2 Challenge =

1992 video game

- North American cover art
- Developer(s): Park Place Productions
- Publisher(s): Mindscape
- Producer(s): Mark Beaumont
- Programmer(s): Jim Hanson
- Composer(s): Michelle Simon
- Platform(s): NES
- Release: EU: 1992; NA: May 1992
- Genre(s): Traditional sports (arcade basketball)
- Mode(s): Single-player

Roundball: 2-On-2 Challenge is a two-on-two basketball video game for the Nintendo Entertainment System that is played on a half court.

Games are played in an arena with a scoreboard and crowd.

There is also an option to play a one-on-one game. The game modes contain an exhibition game and a tournament mode. Four teams play against each other in a round-robin format in order to determine the winner. Games can be set for either four, eight, twelve or sixteen minutes. Players can choose from 24 fictional basketball athletes - named after the game developers - who each have their own individual stats. The referee is capable of calling fouls in this game.

== Reception ==
Allgame gave Roundball: 2 on 2 Challenge a rating of 2.5 out of a possible 5 stars. N-Force gave the a 77% rating while NES Archives gave Roundball: 2 on 2 Challenge a letter grade of C+.
