= Adam Curry =

American broadcasting and internet personality (born 1964)

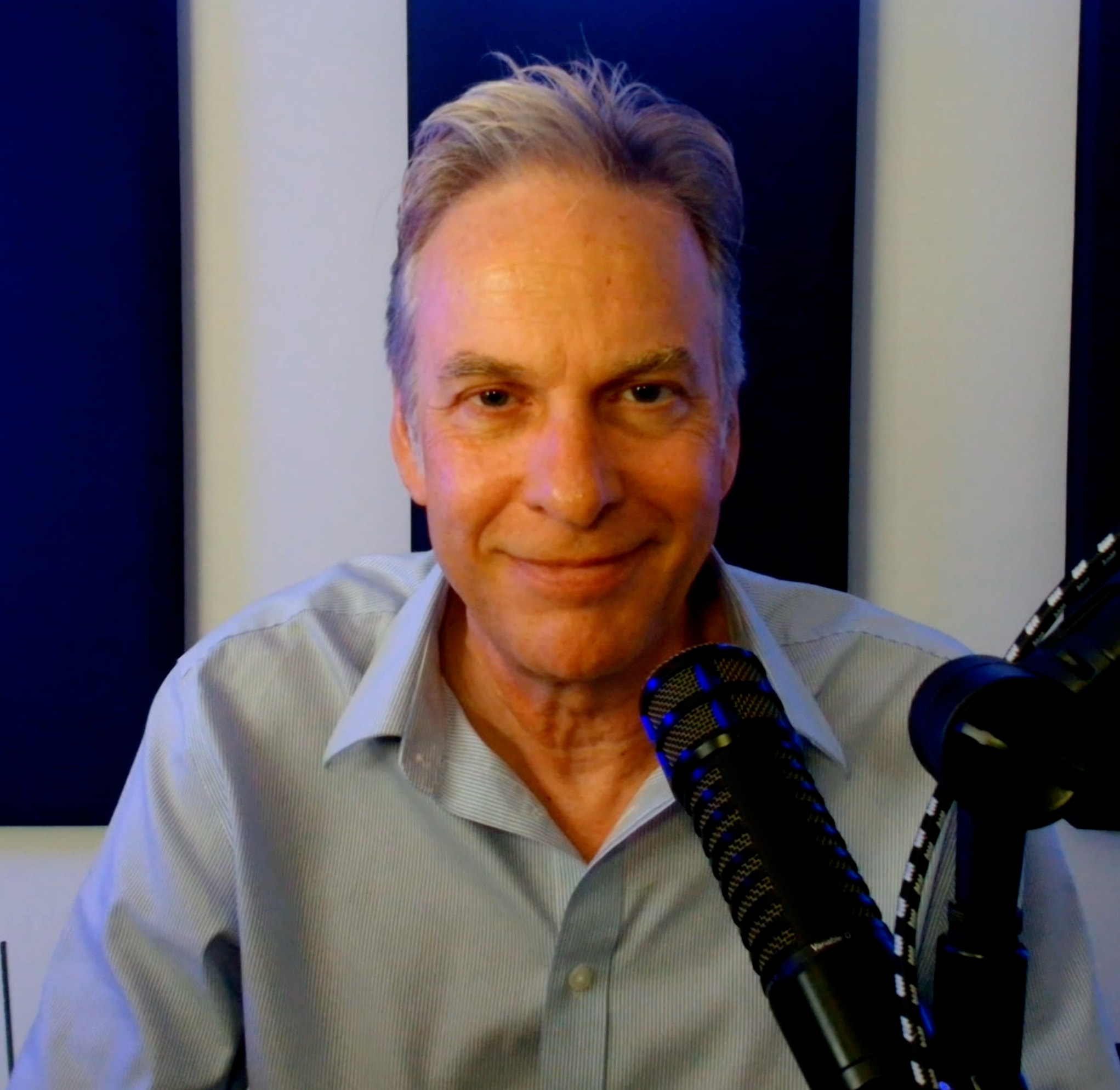
- Curry in 2024
- Born: September 3, 1964 (age 62); Arlington, Virginia, U.S.
- Known for: MTV VJ; Mevio Inc; Daily Source Code; No Agenda
- Height: 6 ft 5 in (1.96 m)
- Spouses: Patricia Paay (m. 1989; div. 2009); Micky Hoogendijk (m. 2012; div. 2015); Tina Snider (m. 2019)
- Children: 1
- Call sign: K5ACC
- Website: curry.com

Adam Clark Curry (born September 3, 1964) is an American podcaster, announcer, internet entrepreneur, and media personality, known for his stint as a VJ on MTV and being one of the first celebrities to personally create and administer websites. Also known for co-hosting the No Agenda show, which ended on October 29, 2026 after the passing of John C. Dvorak. In the 2000s, he first became involved in podcasting and has been called the "Podfather" because of his efforts.

== Early broadcast career ==
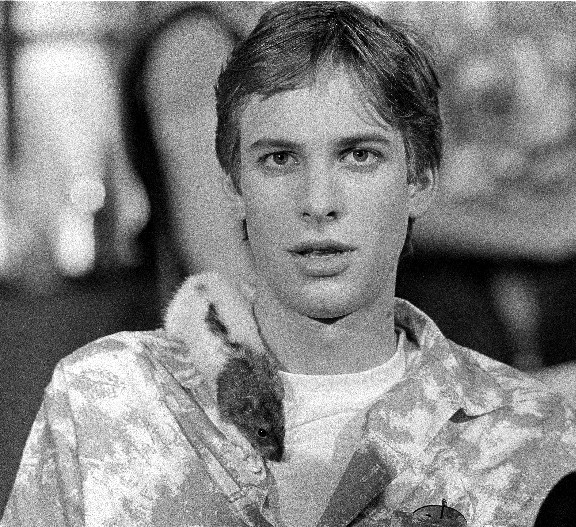
Adam Curry in 1984

Curry was born in Arlington, Virginia, but lived in Amstelveen, Netherlands, from 1972 to 1987. After a time working in Dutch pirate radio at Radio Picasso in Amstelveen and Radio Decibel in Amsterdam in the early 1980s under the pseudonym "John Holden", he got a break in broadcasting as the host of the Dutch weekly pop-music television program Countdown, and the English version of the same show, which was broadcast on pan-European music channel Music Box. He also hosted several other radio and television programs for the Dutch broadcast station Veronica. Aside from Countdown, in the Netherlands, Adam Curry is mostly known for his part in the Curry and Van Inkel radioshow (together with Dutch DJ Jeroen van Inkel), broadcast on Radio 3 for Veronica between 19:00 and 22:00 on Friday.

In 1987, Curry became a VJ for MTV. Besides making spot appearances between music videos, he was also the host of the programs Headbangers Ball and MTV Top 20 Video Countdown in which he interviewed stars like Michael Jackson and Paul McCartney. While working for MTV, he also did radio work, including drive-time host for the New York City radio station WHTZ, and host of the national program HitLine USA.

Curry hosted the radio countdown show "Adam Curry's Top 30 Hitlist" for Entertainment Radio Networks from November 1991 to June 1994.

== Web and MTV.com ==
Curry registered the then-unclaimed domain name "mtv.com" in 1993 with the idea of being MTV's unofficial new voice on the Internet. Although this move was sanctioned by his superiors at MTV Networks at the time, when Curry left to start his own web-portal design and hosting company (OnRamp Inc), MTV subsequently sued him for the domain name.

OnRamp eventually grew to 4,000 employees and was sold to Think New Ideas Inc., another company that he co-founded, becoming chief technology officer of Think. In 1996, as the Internet was undergoing its "bubble", the company made an initial public offering on NASDAQ under the ticker symbol THNK. It subsequently grew to employ over 7,400 people, with offices in seven countries, and was absorbed into Answerthink Inc. in a later merger.

In 2004, Curry founded a video-sharing site called PodShow, which later changed its name to Mevio, with Ron Bloom. In May 2008, Mevio claimed to have reached 9 million unique visitors. It offered advertisers "brand-safe" content on a large scale. It raised a US$15 million third round in July 2008, bringing the total amount it raised since its launch to over US$38 million. Mevio rebranded as Bitesize Entertainment in 2012 and finally BiteSizeTV in 2014, located in Los Angeles, California before closing.

== Enterprises in the U.S. and Europe ==
After selling his business in the United States, Curry and his family moved to the Netherlands in 1999, where Curry hosted a morning talk/music show for Radio Veronica. He also landed various television assignments and his family briefly starred in the reality show Adam's Family.

Curry and two business partners founded the multimedia company United Resources of Jamby in 1999. It was to act as an incubator and cultivator for new Internet-related businesses. The business was ultimately unsuccessful. Curry's participation in Kennisnet, another venture to introduce the Internet to Dutch schools, ended in a bitter argument and lawsuits. Sportus.nl, an online webshop in collaboration with Dutch athletes like Marcel Wouda, Jacco Eltingh, Ron Zwerver and Daniëlle Overgaag, started in 1999, went bankrupt in 2001. Another content exchange project, Freedom Controller, was cancelled in 2002.

In 2000, he and business partner Simon Cavendish, a participant in his earlier ventures, founded the RotorJet company to offer helicopter services. The company filed for bankruptcy in 2005. In the subsequent dispute, Cavendish seized the assets of the company, and in April 2005, Curry was ordered by a Dutch court to repay approximately US$3 million that he had withdrawn from RotorJet.

In 2002, he produced and starred in the reality soap Adam's Family: een kijkje in het leven van de familie Curry (A Glimpse into the Life of the Curry Family) which was aired by the Dutch SBS6 network.

On June 14, 2010, Curry was interviewed by Howard Stern on The Howard Stern Show about being an Internet entrepreneur. During the interview, Curry discussed a previous investment of $65,000 in AskJeeves.com, which he had forgotten until his lawyer called with news of a windfall. "That went public and all of a sudden I had $150 million", he explained.

== Podcasting ==
Curry founded PodShow, now Mevio, with his business partner Ron Bloom, in January 2005. PodShow is a podcast promotions and advertising company that encompasses the Podshow Podcast Network, the Podcast Delivery Network, and the Podsafe Music Network. Some of Podshow's top podcasts are Curry's own Daily Source Code, The Dawn and Drew Show, and GeekBrief.TV.

From June 2005 to May 2007, Curry hosted a weekday evening show on Sirius Satellite Radio called Adam Curry's PodShow.

From October 2007 - October 2026, he hosted the twice-weekly podcast the No Agenda Show with John C. Dvorak, discussing recent news whilst deconstructing mainstream news media.

Curry has promoted his podcasting endeavors. He promoted his podcast Daily Source Code in Second Life under the name 'Adam Neumann', along with a Second Life island called Podshow Island. Curry used podcasting to endorse 2008 Republican presidential hopeful Ron Paul. He also uses his show to discuss alternative takes on topics in the daily news, as well as conspiracy theories such as Free energy suppression and the 9/11 Truth Movement.

Curry has sometimes been credited for popularizing the podcast medium. Annalee Newitz said in Wired that "Every new medium needs a celebrity, and Curry is happy to fill that role."

On March 4, 2020, Curry appeared on Joe Rogan's podcast The Joe Rogan Experience and later re-appeared on September 8, 2020. During the September show, he discussed having Tourette syndrome. Curry returned to the podcast for a third time on July 6, 2021. Adam Curry made a fourth appearance on the show on January 8, 2022, his fifth on January 25, 2023, and a sixth appearance on February 13, 2025.

=== Podcast Index ===
Curry started a podcasting directory called Podcast Index in 2020. The platform is an open-source database of podcasts that, as of 2024, included over four million entries. The service's software is licensed under the open MIT License, and the entire database is downloadable in SQLite format. Podcast Index collects web feeds of podcasts that developers can then use in their projects and applications, for example, the podcast player "podchaser".

== Creative Commons licensing ==
In February 2006, Curry sued the Dutch tabloid Weekend for reprinting photos from his Flickr page and publishing details about his daughter. The photos were released under a version of the Creative Commons license that forbids commercial use and requires acknowledgement, but the tabloid printed a few of them without contacting Curry. The verdict did not award Curry any damages, but forbade the tabloid from reprinting the photos in the future, setting a fine of €1,000 for each subsequent violation. It was one of the first times the license was tested in court.

In May 2009, Curry posted on his blog that another Dutch tabloid had published another Creative Commons-licensed photo from Curry's Flickr account. After Curry asserted Creative Commons license requirements, the publisher settled on Curry's terms.

== Personal life ==
Since 1999, Curry has, at one time or another, lived in Rijkevorsel, Antwerp Province, Belgium; Guildford and London, England; San Francisco and Los Angeles, California, and Austin, Texas, U.S.

He is fluent in both English and Dutch.

Curry was married to Dutch television/radio personality Patricia Paay from 1989 to 2009. They have a daughter, Christina.

In July 2012, Curry married Micky Hoogendijk. On January 29, 2015, Curry announced on the No Agenda show that he and Hoogendijk had separated. Hoogendijk and Curry divorced in 2015.

Curry married his girlfriend of four years, Tina Snider (dubbed "The Keeper" by John C. Dvorak on the No Agenda Show), on May 19, 2019, in Austin, Texas.

Curry is the nephew of former CIA official and United States Ambassador to Korea Donald Gregg, whom he calls "Uncle Don" in his podcast.

=== Religious beliefs ===
Together with his wife Tina Snider, he found God at age 58. In an interview on Dutch television that was shown right before an episode of the Hour of Power in January 2025, Curry says that he and his wife simultaneously felt the need to find a church and start reading the Bible. After watching the episode of The Chosen in which Jesus explains to Nicodemus how to be born (again) of water and the Spirit, Curry says he was ready to be baptized. He considers it an honorary title when people are calling him a Jesus-freak. Curry talks openly about this process and the changes in his life in interviews and podcasts.
