= Muhammad Ali Heavyweight Boxing =

1992 Sega Genesis video game

- Packaging for the North American Genesis version
- Developer: Park Place Productions
- Publisher: Virgin Games
- Platform: Sega Genesis
- Release: NA: 1992; PAL: July 1993
- Genres: Sports (boxing)
- Modes: Single-player, multiplayer

Muhammad Ali Heavyweight Boxing is a boxing video game that was developed by Park Place Productions and published by Virgin Games in 1992. It was released for the Sega Genesis console.

== Overview ==
The game features Muhammad Ali and nine fictional heavyweight boxers. The game is presented using a mixture of 2D sprites and a 3D ring which allows boxers to move 360 degrees about the ring.

In career mode, the player can choose to fight as any of the game's ten boxers. The selected boxer starts at rank ten in the heavyweight division, and fights their way through all the others in order.

== Gameplay ==
During fights, available punches to be thrown include jabs, hooks, crosses and uppercuts. In simulation mode it is possible to choose to throw any type of punch with either hand, whereas in arcade mode the player chooses which type of punch to throw and the AI determines which of the boxer's fists is the most appropriate to throw it. Defensive maneuvers include blocking and clinching. The more punches a boxer throws, the less damage his punches inflict.

The game can be played in either arcade or simulation mode. Many in-game features are customizable, including round length, number of rounds, and the length of time a boxer must be on the canvas to be classed as knocked out.

== Presentation ==
The visuals of a fight are made up of 2D sprite-based boxers and a simple 3D rendering of the ring. The boxers' sprites include views of them from a side-on position, and from viewpoints that show them having turned a small distance clockwise or anti-clockwise around the ring. As a boxer attempts to move around the ring, the appropriate series of sprites are shown, which works to give the illusion of their turning about.

Blood effects simulate the cuts that boxers sometimes suffer during matches; however, the effect is wildly exaggerated in the game and huge splashes of blood can sometimes be seen flying off a boxer's face. Blood stains remain on the ring floor for the rest of a match; combined with the amount of blood that comes out of fighters' faces, this often leads to much of the ring being covered in it by the end of a match. The damage received to a boxer's face is exhibited by close-up pictures that are shown between rounds. Such images show wounds such as bloody noses or black eyes. The wounds start off semi-realistically, but after sustained punishment, often develop into wildly exaggerated versions of the kind of injuries boxers suffer. In the later rounds of a fight, boxers' faces will sometimes be ripped open by so many large, gaping cuts that they become practically unrecognizable as human beings, let alone individual boxers.

Rather than providing an accurate representation of reality, the game's sound effects reflect an attempt to make the game more exciting by exaggerating the impact force of punches. In particular, the effects for hard punches sound extremely forceful, being more reminiscent of a car door being slammed shut than boxing-glove covered fists impacting with another person.

The game features digitized speech effects for the introduction of fighters, knockdown counts, and the announcement of the outcome of a fight. It is also one of the few boxing games to depict an in-game referee.

While after each fight judges' scorecards are shown for each round, these almost always have no bearing on who the winner is. This is because the winner is decided solely by whichever boxer lands more punches in the fight. The only occasion these scorecards decide an outcome is if both fighters land exactly the same number of punches during a fight.

== Reception ==
Reception

Review scores
Publication	Score
Computer and Video Games	91/100
Game Informer	26/30
GameFan	179/200
GamePro	19/20
GamesMaster	39%
M! Games	40%
Nintendo Power	10.5/20
Total!	45%
VideoGames & Computer Entertainment	7/10

MegaTech gave the game 92% and a Hyper Game Award, stating that it "captures the atmosphere of boxing better than any other boxing game".
