= Skyfox (1984 video game) =

- Developer: Ray Tobey
- Publishers: NA: Electronic Arts; EU: Ariolasoft
- Platforms: Amiga, Amstrad CPC, Apple II, Atari ST, Commodore 64, Macintosh, PC-88, ZX Spectrum
- Release: 1984: Apple II; 1985: C64, CPC, Spectrum, Mac; 1986: Amiga, Atari ST; 1988: PC-88
- Genre: Combat flight simulator
- Mode: Single-player

Skyfox is a combat flight simulation game developed by Ray Tobey for the Apple II and published by Electronic Arts in 1984. Ariolasoft published the game in Europe. It was released for the ZX Spectrum, Amstrad CPC, Commodore 64, and Macintosh in 1985, to the Amiga and Atari ST in 1986, and to the PC-88 in 1988.

The 1987 sequel, Skyfox II: The Cygnus Conflict, was developed for the Commodore 64 by Dynamix without Tobey's involvement.

== Description ==
The player pilots the Skyfox, the most advanced attack fighter plane available, which is armed with radar guided missiles, heat-seeking missiles, laser cannons and deflection shields. Gameplay consists of finding and destroying enemy tanks, planes and motherships. The goal of the game is to defend one's bases and slow the ongoing invasion. The game has 15 scenarios that can be played at five skill levels.

== Reception ==
Reception

Award
Publication	Award
Your Sinclair	YS Megagame

By the end of 1987, Skyfox was Electronic Arts' best-selling Commodore 64 game. Sales surpassed 250,000 copies by November 1989.

Benn Dunnington, writing in Info, rated Skyfox for the Commodore 64 three-plus stars out of five, praising the graphics but stating that "the gamester finds a much less involving product lying below the surface glitz ... Good run for a few hours".

In Issue 8 of Gateways, Charles and Sydney Barouch called this a "difficult and sophisticated game. It borrows heavily from wargames for the strategical [sic] aspect of the game." The Barouches noted, "The graphics are not state of the art, but they are nicely drawn and do give the illusion of motion." They concluded, "Strategy and planning seem to be the watchword here; the shoot-'em-up is only a part of the action."

Richard Mansfield of Compute! called the Amiga version a game that required "both forethought and quick reflexes ... one of the best available for the Amiga". It concluded that "the designers and programmers have outdone themselves in exploiting the Amiga's powerful features ... a simulation which rivals the best computer games available in any medium".

In a 1994 survey of wargames, Computer Gaming World gave the ten-year-old game 1+ stars out of 5.
