= Sega Visions =

Video game magazine

- Publisher: The Communique Group (1990–92); International Data Group (1992–95)
- First issue: 1990; 35 years ago
- Final issue: 1995; 30 years ago
- Country: USA
- Language: English
- OCLC: 794192137

Sega Visions was a video game magazine running from 1990 to 1995 that focused on games made for Sega consoles such as Master System, Game Gear, Mega Drive / Genesis, and Sega CD.

== History ==
Sega Visions was launched by Sega in 1990 as an answer to the popular game magazine Nintendo Power, which was produced by Nintendo and focused exclusively on games for Nintendo consoles. Sega had previously produced a Team Sega Newsletter, which was a small, simple magazine, mostly used to advertise Master System games. Once the Genesis proved popular with game players, it was Sega's ambition to create a more in depth magazine with reviews, previews, game strategies, and more, which ultimately became Sega Visions. Its premiere issue in June/July 1990 was sent free to registered Master System and Genesis owners.

The magazine was initially published by The Communique Group. In 1992, International Data Group, who also published the popular game magazine GamePro, took over publishing for the rest of its lifespan. The magazine had a rather sporadic release schedule, some issues being two months apart, others four months. Sega Visions ended its run after 25 issues with its September 1995 issue being the last published. Nowhere in the magazine was there any reference made to it being the final issue and text in a caption included a preview of the next issue.

The magazine also had its own comic character in Niles Nemo (created by Bill Kunkel). Niles (a play on Little Nemo) was a teenage boy with sunglasses who loved pizza and everything Sega.
