= Rob Scholte =

Dutch artist

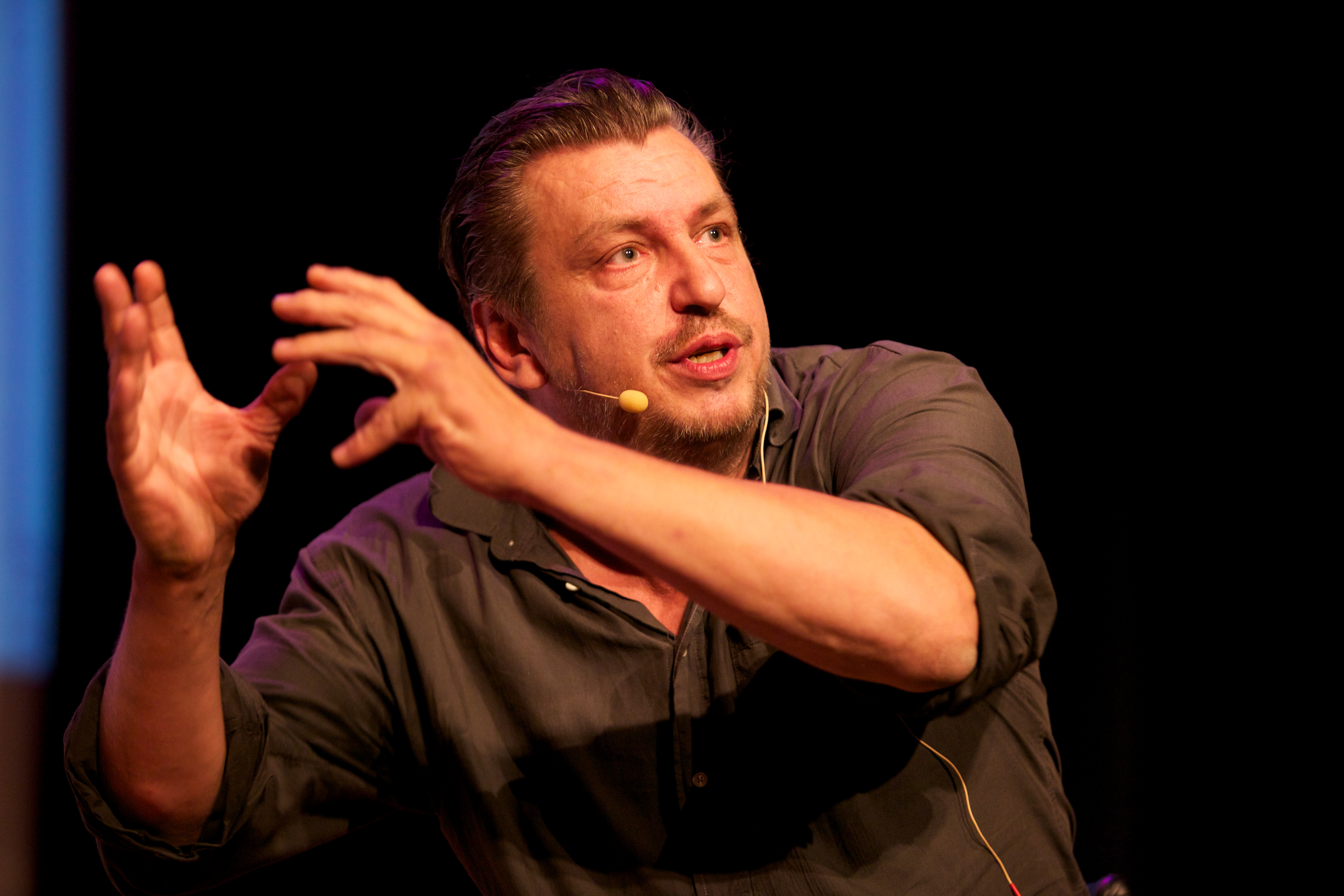
Rob Scholte giving a lecture during the incubate pirate conference 2010 in Tilburg, Netherlands

Rob Scholte (born 1 June 1958) is a Dutch contemporary artist. From 1977 to 1982 he studied at the Gerrit Rietveld Academie, Amsterdam. His work consists of reproductions of images from the media and from art history. He lives and works in Den Helder.

His work has been shown in Galerie Witteveen Amsterdam (2004, 2005, 2006), Ludwig Forum für Internationale Kunst, Aachen (2005), Groninger Museum (2002); Fries Museum (2000), Paleis Huis ten Bosch, Nagasaki (1995), Sprengel Museum, Hannover (1994), Grey Art Gallery, New York (1993), Museum Van Bommel-Van Dam, Venlo (1992), Kunsthaus Hamburg (1991), Stedelijk Museum, Amsterdam (1990), Museum of Contemporary Art, Tokyo (1989), Aperto, Venice (1988), Boijmans Van Beuningen (1988); Documenta, Kassel (1987), São Paulo Art Biennial (1985), Venice Biennale (1990).

In 1994 Scholte lost both his legs when a bomb exploded under his car. In 1995 a molotov cocktail was thrown through the window of his house in Tenerife.

== Selected work ==
- Olympia (1988): a copy of Manet's Olympia which replaces the naked woman with a wooden puppet.
- Après Nous le Deluge (1995): a mural inside the replica of the Huis ten Bosch at the Dutch-themed amusement park in Sasebo, Nagasaki, Japan.
- Blue period (2004): familiar logos, images or objects in blue and white and mounted in classical, golden frames.
- The Embroidery Show (2005): existing pieces of embroidery hung back to front on the wall. There was an exhibition of these pieces in Museum de Fundatie (Zwolle, Netherlands) from April to September 2016.

== Selected bibliography ==
- How to Star. Cat. Museum Boijmans Van Beuningen, Rotterdam (1988).
- All the portraits are up to date. Cat. Galerie Paul Maenz, Cologne (1988).
- 6 Dutch Artists. Cat. Fruitmarket Gallery, Edinburgh (1989).
- Energieën. Cat. Stedelijk Museum, Amsterdam (1990).
- Rob Scholte. Cat. Art Random, Kyoto (1990).
- 7 Year Itch. Cat. Kunstverein, Hannover (1991).
- Après nous le déluge. Cat. Huis ten Bosch, Nagasaki (1992).
- Nether Art. Cat. Grey Art Gallery, New York (1993).
- The Living Room. Cat. Kunstverein Grafschaft, Bentheim (1995).
- As far as Japan. Cat. NBKS, Breda (1996).
- Plug-Ins. Cat. Fries Museum, Leeuwarden (2000).

== See also ==
- Appropriation art
