= Ray Tobey =

American video game programmer (born c. 1965)

- Born: 1964 or 1965 (age 61–62)
- Occupations: Game designer Game programmer
- Employer: Electronic Arts
- Known for: Skyfox

Ray Tobey (born c. 1965) is an American video game programmer best known for writing the combat flight simulation game Skyfox for the Apple II, published by Electronic Arts in 1984. He was later hired by EA and wrote the fighting game Budokan: The Martial Spirit (1989).

== Career ==
After taking a six-week summer computer class at school when he was 13, Tobey saved for a year to purchase a Commodore PET 2001 for $800. He learned BASIC and then 6502 machine language and moved to the Apple II.

At 16, Tobey and his friend, Chris Brookins, worked on a combat flight sim called Alpha Strike for the Apple II for two years. When they went to Boston for the 1982 Applefest, they were invited to meet Rod Nakamoto, a game industry executive, who praised the game and introduced them to Apple Computer co-founder Steve Wozniak. Wozniak was amazed by the visual effects Tobey had achieved with the game. He had recently joined the Board of Directors of Electronic Arts, and he gave Tobey a business card with a message for EA President Trip Hawkins written on the back: "Trip, Please consider this flight simulator as the finest Apple game ever done. Woz".

Tobey was still only a senior in high school. Less than two weeks later, EA flew him and his parents to Northern California for a meeting. Game programmer Bill Budge urged Tobey to sign a development deal. After his graduation in June, he rejected a rival offer from Sir-Tech and committed to EA to produce the newly renamed Skyfox, becoming their second-youngest developer.

Tobey initially continued work on the game at home for several months, but when there was one month left in the schedule EA suggested that he come to California. As it turned out, he would work at the EA offices in San Mateo for almost a year before completing the game. He worked closely with producer Stewart Bonn and with Richard Hilleman, both of whom later held senior management positions at EA. Although nominally an independent developer, Tobey worked in the EA offices alongside other employees. Key to the title's evolution during that year was its re-structuring as a mission-based game, a structure that would be emulated by many later combat flight sims.

When the game was released in 1984, it became one of EA's biggest early hits, selling over 400,000 copies. In 1988, Tobey joined EA as an employee and programmed the martial arts fighting game Budokan: The Martial Spirit.
