= Kennisnet =

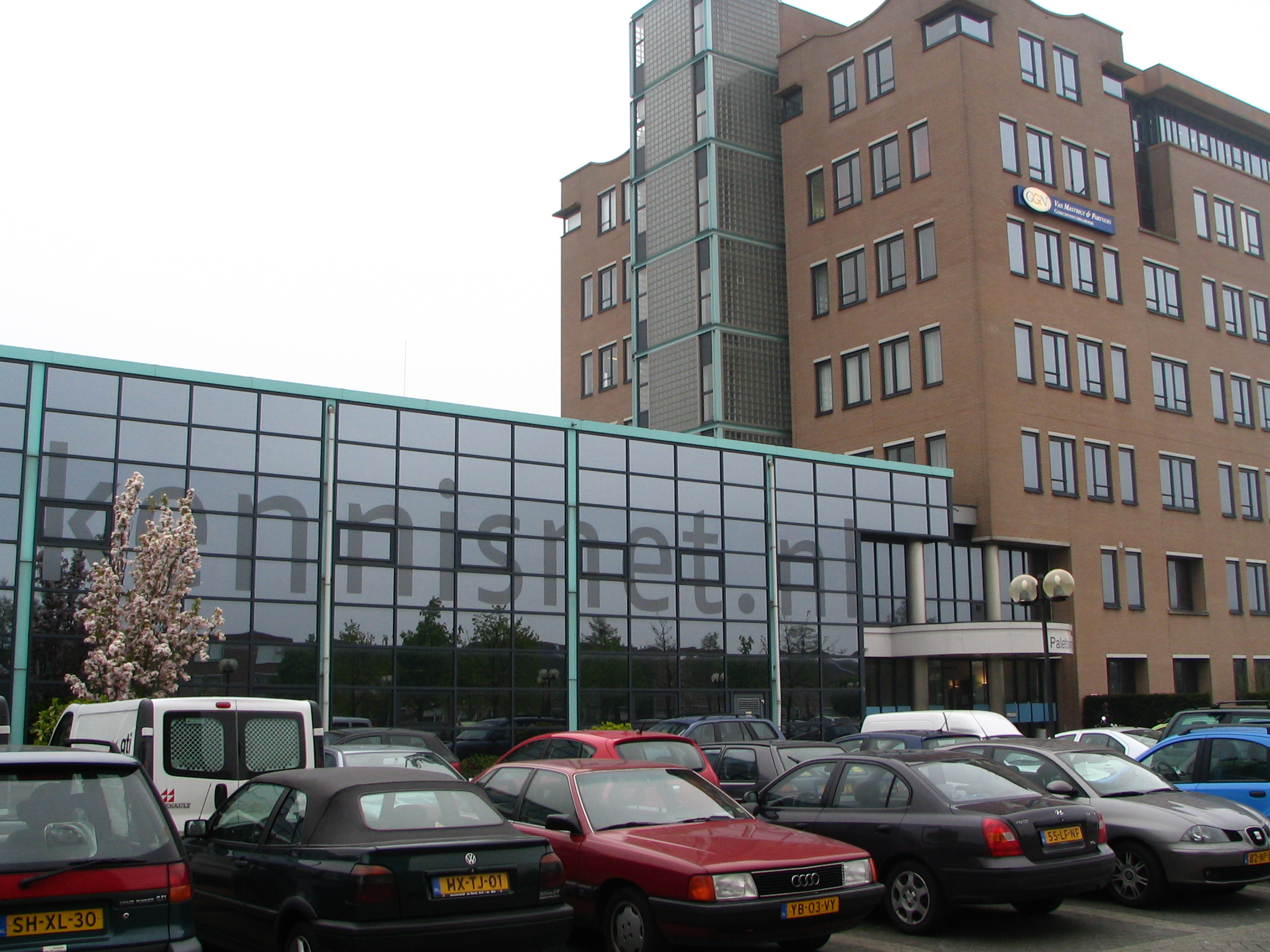
The office building of Kennisnet

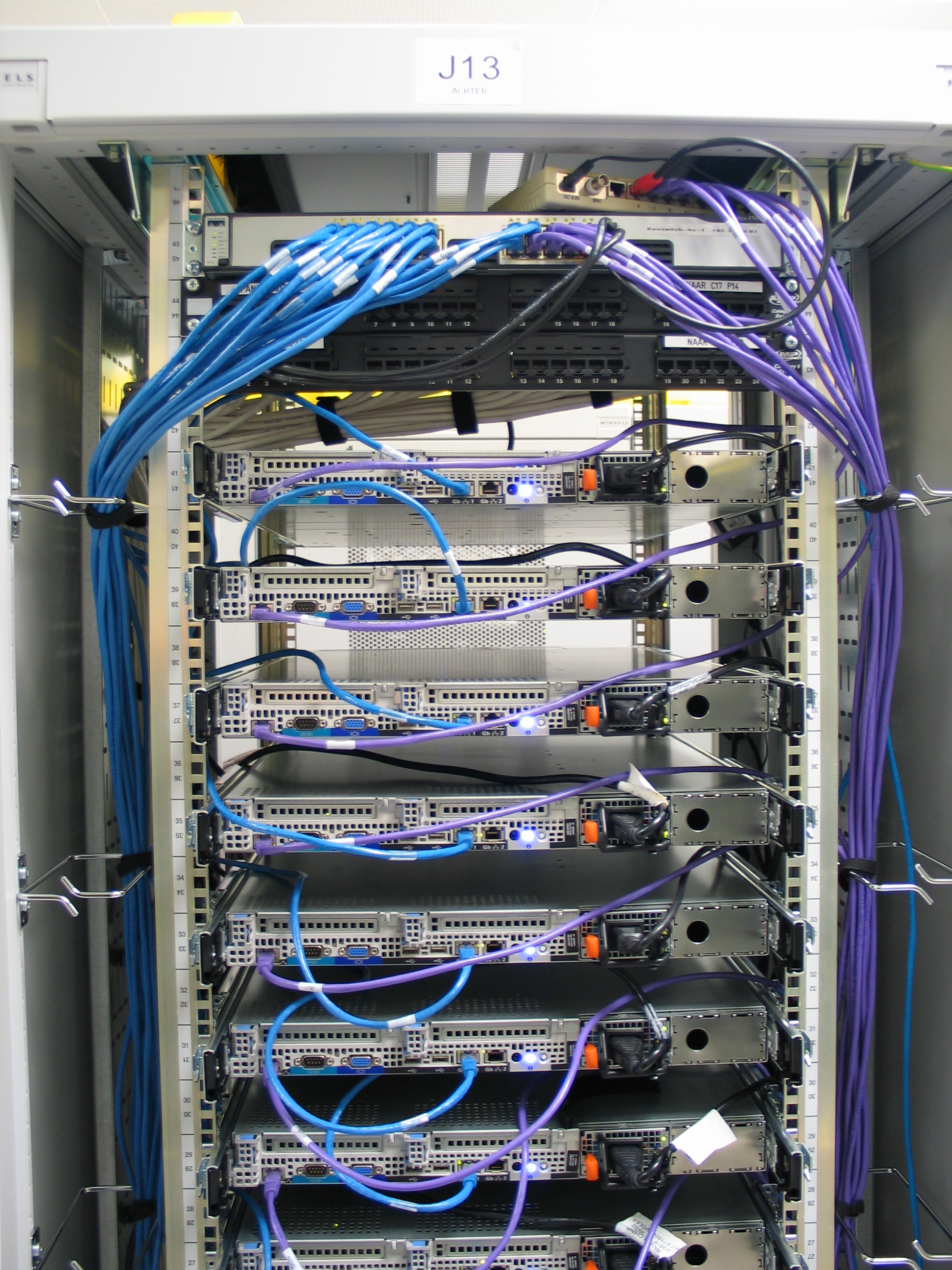
The Wikimedia servers in Amsterdam, pictured in 2006

Kennisnet (translated from Dutch as Knowledge Net, previously Kennisnet Ict op school) is a Dutch public (semi-governmental) organization dedicated to ICT-innovation for primary and secondary education and vocational training. Kennisnet provides educational content and information to teachers, pupils and parents. Kennisnet also stimulates the use of information technology in educational processes by providing technical and practical support for several innovative educational aids. Kennisnet is funded by the Dutch Ministry of Education, Culture and Science.

Kennisnet provided hosting and bandwidth for fifty Wikimedia Foundation servers from June 2005 to 2009, located at SARA in the Science Park Amsterdam.

== Davindi ==
Davindi was a search engine for searching the open source Kennisnet database. The name is a pun on Leonardo da Vinci's surname and the Dutch word vind which means find in English. It did not crawl the internet, but only gave search results which are vetted by Davindi editors. Apart from text documents, also videos images and sound files could be found. The search engine also gave results from other educational sources such as Kennislink. Davindi gave results from more than 50,000 sources related to primary and secondary education, vocational education and adult education.

== External ==
- Official website (in Dutch)
