= The Dawn and Drew Show =

Comedy podcast

- Genre: Comedy

Cast and voices
- Hosted by: Dawn Miceli, Drew Domkus

Publication
- Original release: September 23, 2004 – December 31, 2025

Related
- Website: thedawnanddrewshow.com

The Dawn and Drew Show was a podcast starring and produced by a married couple, Dawn Miceli (born in West Allis, Wisconsin) and Drew Domkus (formerly of the Scaterd Few).

The hosts describe themselves as "[…] two ex gutter punks who fall in love, buy a retired farm in Wisconsin (then move to Costa Rica and back) and tell the world their dirty secrets… Always profane, rarely profound."

== Host biographies ==
Dawn and Drew live with many pets including dogs, a cat, and a sugar glider. The couple used to own Echo Books and Chocolate Lounge in Playa Cocles, Costa Rica. They moved back to their farmhouse in Wayne, Wisconsin after being robbed and nearly killed in their home in Playa Cocles, Costa Rica. While they regroup and work up a game plan, Dawn Miceli continues to tour with the band Rasputina while Drew tries to learn how to make iPhone apps.

== Show format ==
The shows were spontaneous, although some trends developed. These often entail Dawn singing, or the signature sign-off, "Good night, Inkernet." Dawn would often tell a peculiar story; Drew often comments on these stories, getting Dawn sidetracked, at which point Dawn emasculates Drew. Listeners were invited to call their audio comment line at (206) 666-3825 (which, on an alphanumeric touchtone phone, spells the oft-mentioned "MOM-FUCK"), to leave a voice message, and these messages were then played at the end of each show. Family members of both hosts have made appearances on the show.

== Mevio negotiations ==
Their show was one of the first to become part of Adam Curry's PodShow network, which at one point carried Dawn and Drew over Sirius Satellite Radio. In September 2008, on show 800, Dawn and Drew revealed that contract renegotiations with Mevio (formerly PodShow) fell through, and were going to be independent. Without warning, Mevio shut off access to their webserver.

== D&D Productions ==
In 2010, Dawn and Drew's production company, D&D Productions, produced the concert/tour video Under the Corset directed by Dawn about the band Rasputina.

In 2014, Dawn directed Unmasked!, a touring video about the band Captured! by Robots.

== Academy of Podcasters Hall of Fame ==
Dawn and Drew were announced as inductees into the 2016 Academy of Podcasters Hall of Fame.
