= Info Exame =

- Editor: Airton Lopes, Maurício Moraes, Maria Isabel Moreira
- Categories: Technology magazine
- Frequency: Monthly
- Circulation: nearly 200,000
- First issue: March, 1986
- Final issue: August, 2015
- Company: Editora Abril
- Country: Brazil
- Based in: São Paulo
- Language: Portuguese
- Website: http://info.abril.com.br

Info Exame (or simply Info, stylized as INFO) was a high-popular Brazilian technology magazine. Its name was Exame Informática initially, a reference to its creation as the technology supplement for Exame, a business magazine. It was popular with technology non-experts because of its simple-language approach to IT-related topics. The headquarters was in São Paulo.

Besides the magazine, the INFO brand was a reference in digital tendencies, sciences, culture and entrepreneurism. It is the inspiration for those who want to understand – in an instigating and good-humored way – the impact innovations have on our lives and our business.

The magazine ceased its publication in August 2015, becoming again a supplement in the Exame magazine. Its website now redirects to Exame website technology section.

== Main Topics ==
- Enter: Opening section of the magazine that combines notes, short interviews, curiosities and in vogue services on the Internet, while also presenting innovative profiles and people.;
  - Ideias: A section opinions from our three renowned columnists. Besides them, every month INFO magazine brings a special guest to be part of this section.;
  - Inovação: The section that presents the magazine's biggest stories, with reports on the most-varied subjects, such as entrepreneurism, behavior, tendencies in digital culture and new technologies.;
  - Tests: Section dedicated to products tested by INFOlab. With a technical evaluation of its operation, the magazine evaluates and scores products in relation to cost / benefit. From smartphones to ultrabooks, and including refrigerators, TV, sound and even bicycles and soccer boots.;
  - Ctrl+Z: The magazine closes by going back in time, showing cool products published in INFO. CTRL-Z takes the reader back to a remarkable past.;

== INFOlab ==
Is a special magazine's team destined to test the last-generation products bought by the magazine before their market release.

=== Grade System ===
It is a system used by the laboratory's team to classify the products reviewed. This grade system was announced in 2002 and it was the official grade system until the end of the magazine:

- "IMPECCABLE" (10): it's the highest level possible, but it has never been reached by any product in the magazine's history;
- "Excellent" (9 - 9.9);
- "Very Good" (8 - 8.9);
- "Good" (7 - 7.9);
- "Intermediate" (6 - 6.9);
- "Regular" (5 - 5.9);
- "Weak" (4 - 4.9);
- "Very Weak" (3 - 3.9);
- "Terrible" (2 - 2.9);
- "Bomb" (1 - 1.9);
- "JUNK" (0): it's the worst level that any product can reach. Fortunately, this level has never been reached before.

=== Yearly Review ===
On December of every year the magazine makes a special edition with 30 pages or more only with reviews about the products that will be released in the following year.

=== Historical Products ===
Here is a list of the worldly best-selling products that passed through Info Laboratory before getting huge fame:

- Palm III: the first palmtop to sell more than 3 million of units, it was fifth creation from Palm, Inc;
- iMac: the most powerful and well-succeeded computer's line from Apple Inc;
- Treo 600: it was the first generation of the Treo smartphone's line. It was created by "Palm, Inc";
- BlackBerry: the most popular smartphone in the world got a good general review (7.5/10), but failed in the graphics review (4/10) because of his low-resolution;
- iPod: it was the first generation of the iPod's Classic Line, with only 5GB;
- iPod Touch: the iPod's last generation reached third best review of the magazine ("VERY GOOD") in the general review (8.5/10);
- iPhone: Apple's mobile-phone reached the same level ("VERY GOOD") of its "iPod brother", the iPod Touch, with the grade 8/10.
