= John C. Dvorak =

American journalist and radio broadcaster (1946–2026)

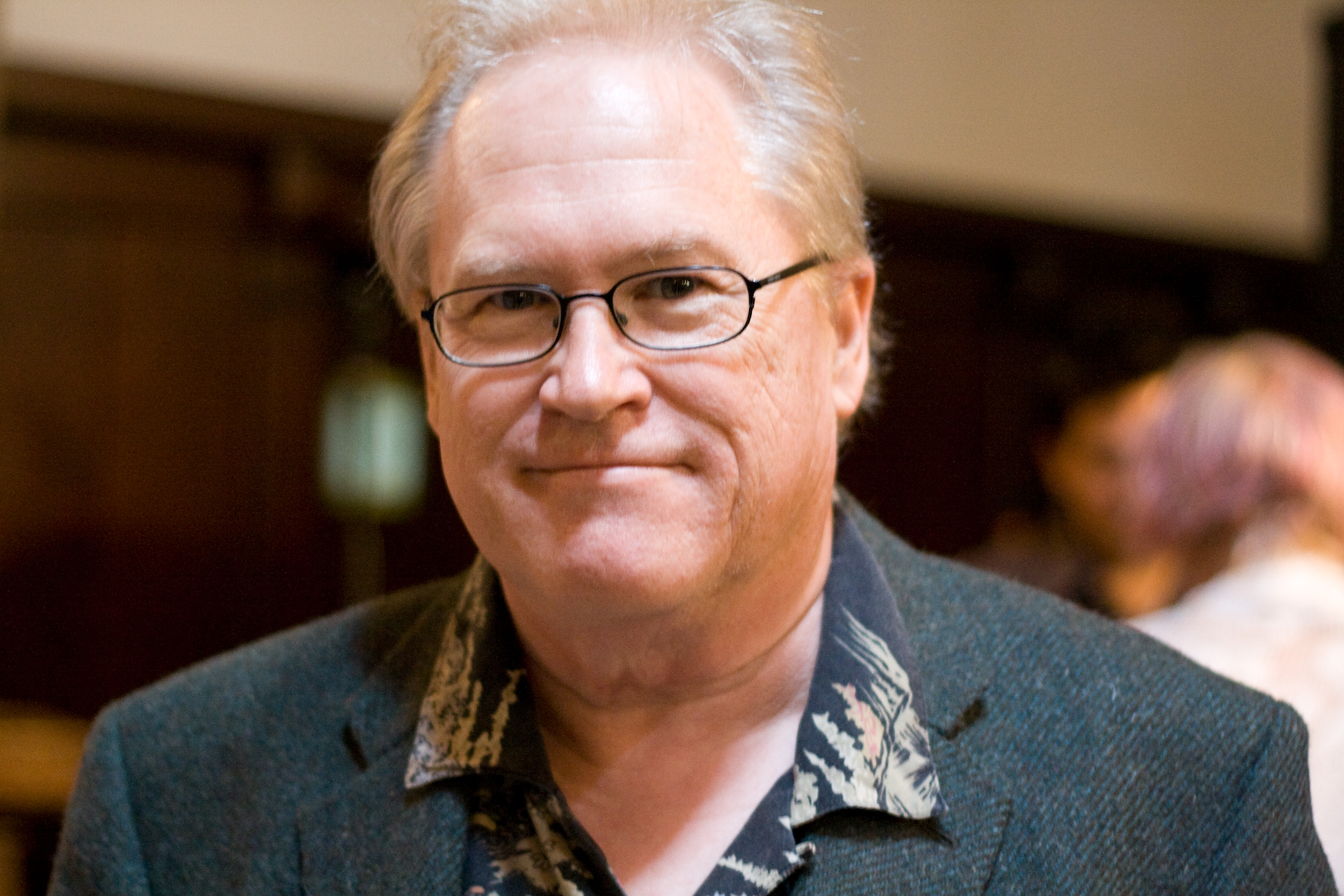
- Dvorak in 2007
- Born: April 5, 1946; Fresno, California, U.S.
- Died: July 20, 2026 (aged 80); Albany, California, U.S.
- Education: University of California, Berkeley
- Occupations: Writer, host, podcaster
- Spouse: Marolee "Mimi" Dvorak
- Relatives: August Dvorak (uncle)
- Website: www.dvorak.org/blog/

John Charles Dvorak (/ˈdvɔːræk/; April 5, 1946 – July 20, 2026) was an American writer and broadcaster in the areas of technology and personal computing. He was a columnist for multiple magazines from the 1980s and wrote or co-authored over a dozen how-to books on software and technology. Dvorak was vice president of Mevio, and was a host on TechTV and TWiT.tv. His last role was co-host of the No Agenda podcast.

== Early life ==
Dvorak was born in Fresno, California, on April 5, 1946.

== Writing career ==
=== Periodicals ===
Dvorak started his career as a wine writer.

He wrote for various publications, including InfoWorld, PC Magazine (two separate columns since 1986), MarketWatch, BUG Magazine (Croatia), and Info Exame (Brazil). He has been a columnist for Boardwatch, Forbes, Forbes.com, MacUser, MicroTimes, PC/Computing, Barron's Magazine, Smart Business, and The Vancouver Sun. (The MicroTimes column ran under the banner Dvorak's Last Column.) He has written for The New York Times, Los Angeles Times, MacMania Networks, International Herald Tribune, The San Francisco Examiner and The Philadelphia Inquirer, among numerous other publications.

Dvorak created a few tech running jokes. In episode 18 of TWiT (This Week in Tech) he claimed that, thanks to his hosting provider, he "gets no spam."

=== Books ===
Dvorak wrote or co-authored over a dozen books, including Hypergrowth: The Rise and Fall of the Osborne Computer Corporation with Adam Osborne and Dvorak's Guide to Desktop Telecommunications in 1990, Dvorak's Guide to PC Telecommunications (Osborne McGraw-Hill, Berkeley, California, 1992), Dvorak's Guide to OS/2 (Random House, New York, 1993) with co-authors David B. Whittle and Martin McElroy, Dvorak Predicts (Osborne McGraw-Hill, Berkeley, California, 1994), Online! The Book (Prentice Hall PTR, October, 2003) with co-authors Wendy Taylor and Chris Pirillo, and e-book Inside Track 2013.

== Television and online media ==
Dvorak was on the start-up team for CNET Networks, appearing on the television show CNET Central. He also hosted a radio show called Real Computing, and later Technically Speaking on NPR, as well as a television show on TechTV (formerly ZDTV) called Silicon Spin. Dvorak helped develop the game Dvorak On Typing.

He appeared on Marketwatch TV and This Week in Tech, a podcast audio and now video program hosted by Leo Laporte and featuring other former TechTV personalities such as Patrick Norton, Kevin Rose, and Robert Heron. Dvorak was once banned from the show. In March 2006, he started a new show called CrankyGeeks, where he led a rotating panel of "cranky" tech gurus in discussions of technology news stories of the week. The last episode (No. 237) aired on September 22, 2010.

In 2007, Mevio hired Dvorak as vice president and managing editor for a new Mevio TECH channel, where he managed content from existing Mevio tech programming. He also hosted the show Tech5, where he discussed the day's tech news in approximately five minutes; it ended production in late 2010. He co-hosted a podcast with Mevio co-founder Adam Curry called No Agenda. The show was a conversation about the week's news, happenings in the lives of the hosts and their families, and restaurant reviews from the dinners Dvorak and Curry have together when they were in the same city (usually San Francisco). Curry usually had more outlandish opinions of the week's news or world events, while Dvorak played the straight man in the dialogue.

Dvorak hosted the show X3, which, like the defunct Tech 5, was a short tech-focused cast. Unlike Tech 5, it was in video format, with two co-hosts. The last update was 24 June 2012.

Beginning in September 2009, Dvorak hosted the DH Unplugged podcast with personal money manager Andrew Horowitz.

In September 2015, Laporte banned Dvorak—his long-time friend and frequent guest—from TWiT for comments Dvorak made on Twitter. In reply to Dvorak's comments that Laporte was biased, Laporte told Dvorak "you won't ever have to worry about it again", insinuating that he never wanted Dvorak back on TWiT. Dvorak returned to TWiT on December 23, 2018.

== Personal life and death ==
Dvorak married Marolee "Mimi" Smith on August 8, 1988. He was listed as a minister of the Universal Life Church. He said on show #600 of No Agenda that he occasionally posted online under the pseudonym Mark Pugner.

Dvorak died on July 20, 2026, at the age of 80 in Albany, California.

== Awards and honors ==
Dvorak was the creator and lead judge of the Dvorak Awards (1992–1997).

In 2001, he received the Telluride Tech Festival Award of Technology.

He received the title of Kentucky Colonel, the highest title of honor awarded by the Commonwealth of Kentucky.

In July 2016, Dvorak and co-host Adam Curry won the "Best Podcast" Podcast Award for No Agenda, in the News & Politics category.
