= No Agenda =

Political podcast

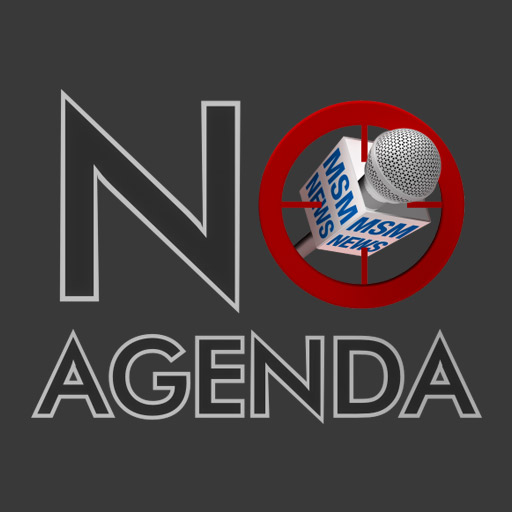
- No Agenda album art
- Genre: Comedy, Political Talk

Cast and voices
- Hosted by: Adam Curry, John C. Dvorak

Publication
- No. of episodes: 1,916
- Original release: October 26, 2007 – October 30, 2026
- Updates: Sunday and Thursday
- License: CC BY 3.0

Related
- Website: www.noagendashow.net

No Agenda is a podcast co-created by Adam Curry and John C. Dvorak. Since its launch, the show has been recorded twice weekly, on Thursdays and Sundays, and is primarily focused on deconstructing and critiquing mainstream news media. Following Dvorak's death in July 2026, Curry announced that the podcast would continue, beginning with a memorial episode featuring stories and anecdotes from Dvorak's family and friends. Although, ultimately decided to end the podcast which had it's final episode October 29, 2026.

The show has no advertisers and instead subsists entirely on donations. There are no guidelines for the amount and frequency of contributions; instead, these are left to the discretion of the listener, a model called "value for value" by the show's hosts. The show also relies on its listeners—dubbed "producers"—to provide artwork and audio clips.

In July 2016, the show won the Podcast Award for Best Podcast in the category "News & Politics." In September 2013, the show was nominated for Podcast Awards in two categories, "People's Choice" and "Politics / News". Talkers Magazine featured the podcast in their "Frontier Fifty", an alphabetically sorted list containing a "Selection of Outstanding Talk Media Webcasters".

In December 2009, the show announced they had reached 450,000 listeners. During an appearance on The Joe Rogan Experience in July 2021, Curry stated that No Agenda has 1–1.4 million listeners per episode.

A primer has been produced for newer listeners, both as an introduction and a discussion of the show.

== History ==
No Agenda debuted in October 2007. Its premise was that the co-founder (Curry) and then vice-president (Dvorak) of mevio (until Oct. 2012) would have an unfiltered dialogue. The impetus for starting the show, according to Curry, was a 4-minute phone call made to Dvorak saying that they "should do a show together." Little thought was given to what the show would be about, in fact only the name was agreed upon before the first show was recorded. The show discusses news, current events and conspiracy theories.

The podcast does not accept advertising and is supported by the listeners to prevent conflicts of interest. Through this direct listener-supported model, those that contribute amounts above a predetermined level are referred to as executive producers.

No Agenda was named to Talkers Magazine's Frontier Fifty list for 2011, a list of 'Outstanding Media Webcasters.'

The show received five out of five microphones in review published by Podcast Magazine.

In episode 1798 (“Adam & The Robot”, 11 September 2025), Curry briefly said he had “yesterday thought [he] would stop doing this show” during an on-air exchange with co-host John C. Dvorak, before continuing the program.

== No Agenda Social ==
No Agenda Social served as the flagship social media platform for the show until early 2024 when it was closed down. A goal of this platform was to avoid the censorship, restrictions, and rules found on many "Big Tech" social media platforms. It ran Mastodon software and was connected to a network of distributed social media platforms known as the Fediverse.
