= Mevio =

American internet entertainment network (2004–2014)

- Industry: Media
- Predecessor: PodShow Inc.
- Founded: October 2004
- Founders: Adam Curry, Ron Bloom
- Defunct: April 2014
- Successor: Bitesize Networks Inc.
- Headquarters: San Francisco, CA, Hollywood, CA
- Website: mevio.com at the Wayback Machine (archived March 14, 2014)

Mevio Inc. (formerly known as PodShow) was an American internet entertainment network, founded in San Francisco, California in October 2004 by Adam Curry and Ron Bloom.

== History ==
PodShow Inc. was founded in San Francisco, California on 1 October 2004 by Adam Curry and Ron Bloom, as a digital media network, with the aim of helping people publish and market their podcasts, and to help listeners find podcasts that suit their interests.

In August 2005, PodShow received about $8.85 million in Venture Capital from the Sand Hill Road firms Kleiner Perkins, Sequoia Capital, and Sherpalo Ventures.

On August 23, 2005, PodShow announced the launch of the Podsafe Music Network. The site allows musicians or record labels to upload podsafe music into their system so that podcasters may download it for use on their podcasts, as well as the ability to sell music to listeners.

In September 2005, PodShow acquired Podcast Alley, a directory that can be used to help people find and subscribe to podcasts.

In February 2006, Curry announced Podshow L.A., a production division being set up by Mark Yoshimoto Nemcoff. In September, BT PodShow, a service co-branded with British Telecom was launched for the UK and Ireland. On September 29, 2006, PodShow Inc. announced that the company had raised a second round of venture funding from new and original investors, totaling $15 million, led by DAG Ventures.

In July 2008, mevio secured $15 million in a Series C funding round led by Crosslink Capital and including Kleiner Perkins Caufield & Byers, Sequoia Capital, Sherpalo Ventures, and DAG Ventures. Mevio intends to use the investment to continue expansion of its broadband entertainment offering and to launch new vertical entertainment networks.

In December 2012, it was reported that Mevio's co-founder Ron Bloom was to move the company to Hollywood, California under the new name Bitesize Entertainment. Bitesize acquired an 8,000 sq.ft. studio space at the W Hotel at Hollywood and Vine and was to create a "set of channels geared towards a mainstream audience."

In April 2014, Mevio ceased operation and closed down their service, giving content creators and broadcasters 10 days to migrate their feeds and content to an alternative platform before losing it permanently. The website went offline, with no statement from the company.

In March 2016, Mevio's successor Bitesize Networks Inc. was fined for breach of contract after it failed to pay Vertamedia LLC for generating internet traffic for Mevio in 2013. Bitesize was soon purchased by American television broadcaster Media General, and produced the syndicated series Hollywood Today Live for Media General and Fox Television Stations from the Hollywood and Vine studios. It was de facto shut down at the end of April 2017, when Nexstar Media Group merged with Media General and immediately shut down all of Bitesize's operations, as it considered the entire enterprise to be out of format with its broadcasting operations.

== Podcasts ==
Mevio had a small stable of flagship podcasts, including Adam Curry's Daily Source Code, and latterly No Agenda hosted by Curry and John C. Dvorak. Other shows included The Dawn and Drew Show (from October 2005 to October 2008), Madge Weinstein's Yeast Radio (from July 2005 til April 2008), CC Chapman's Accident Hash, Chris Rockwell's "The Daily Download", Canis Lupus and Renamarie Villano's "BandTrax", Julien Smith's "In Over Your Head", Mark Hunter's "The Tartan Podcast", Podshow Radio, PCH (Pacific Coast Hellway), UC Radio Podshow, Sonic Wallpaper, Reaching for Lucidity (from 2005 to 2010), The Frank Truth, Pop17, The Scene Zine, Naive London Girl Podcast, Unleashed, tech vidcast, GeekBrief.TV (from December 2005 to June 2010), Madpod, Alex Balcerski's Ride The Pine, It Could Be Worse..., The Alex Show Podcast and Cranky Geeks.

== Criticisms and controversy ==
After the release of PodShow+ on July 6, 2006, other podcasts's RSS feeds were copied and modified by PodShow, with PodShow copyrights overwriting original feeds. Instead of XML feeds linking to the original, they linked to the internal cache. Adam Curry addressed the issue in the following Saturdays episode of the Daily Source Code in which he stated "We basically cache that, no different from what iTunes does." Curry went on to explain by saying "What should have happened was that the link underneath the orange on white XML button should be a direct link to the original, with original information, no added bits from us, original copyrights etc, Instead of linking to the external feed, it went to the internal feed. It wasn’t a bug, it was a dumb mistake, it slipped through."

PodShow and the PodShow Network have not released broadcast metrics publicly. On March 3, 2007, Adam Curry stated "For the record, In <sic> December 2006 the network produced 52 million download requests." This has created keen interest and rampant speculation by the public, due to the PodShow's notoriety. No clarification has been provided by Adam Curry or the PodShow Network on their use or definition of a "download request". This is of noteworthy interest, as a "download" is commonly interpreted as a single download request which results in a download, while a "download request" could include all requests made for a download (including failed download requests, system-to-system requests, internal administrative requests, or automated time-scheduled RSS feed requested). Additionally, "download requests" may include not only PodShow-owned podcasts, but any "download requests" made through links listed on the PodShow Network website to many independent podcasts.

PodShow's relationship with Sirius Satellite Radio ended on May 1, 2007, without any formal acknowledgment or media release by Sirius Satellite Radio or the PodShow Network. Speculation is that Podshow, having no control over its podcasts compression consistencies, could not guarantee audio quality across the multitude of content being produced. According to P.W. Fenton, the producer of "Adam Curry's Podshow on Sirius", the contract Podshow had with Sirius Satellite Radio had simply expired without any acknowledgement by either company. In fact, P.W. Fenton continued to upload 4 hours of programming each day, hosted by Adam Curry, before learning from a tech at Sirius that the show hadn't been broadcast for weeks.
