= Troy Lyndon =

American video game developer

- Born: Troy Alan Lyndon; November 29, 1964 (age 61); New York, NY
- Occupations: Entrepreneur, business coach, video game developer
- Website: Troy Lyndon website

Troy A. Lyndon (born November 29, 1964, in New York, NY) is an American entrepreneur, game developer, and business coach.

== Early life ==
Troy Lyndon is the son of Jacquie Edelen, a retired HR professional and David Lyndon, a former Marine, retired Aegis Program Director and Sea-sparrow Program Director. Adopted by David, Troy was 6 years old.

== Career ==
At age 13, Troy Lyndon followed in his father's engineering footsteps by starting to develop, Space Voyager, Great Wave and Space Quest, a published video game series for the TRS-80. Encouraged by his childhood friend, David Jennings, he later created or worked on games for the TRS-80, Commodore 64, Macintosh, IBM PC, Sega Genesis, SNES, iOS and Android platforms.

With co-developers Scott Maxwell and Yves Lempereur, he co-authored the Atari 8-bit computer to Commodore 64 adaptations of Time Runner, Snokie, and Flak.

Lyndon completed the Commodore 64 version of Lost Tomb for Datasoft and created the Commodore 64 version of Mr. Do! from the ground up, both consumer adaptations of coin-op arcade games.

Lyndon began his career as a simulated sprite driver developer for the Macintosh version of Star League Baseball, which was later acquired by Activision. Even after the Activision acquisition, GameStar programming continued, and Lyndon went on to develop Star Rank Boxing; Barry McGuigan World Championship Boxing, and GBA Championship Basketball: Two-on-Two. He also worked on the video game adaptation of Howard the Duck.

Lyndon secured a 15-title contract with Capcom to provide a variety of coin-op games to the Commodore 64 and new IBM PC platforms. Street Fighter, Sarge, Speed Rumbler, Hat Trick, Bionic Commando, Ghosts 'n Goblins, Side Arms, and Tiger Road were among the games released. With Christopher Riggs, Lyndon co-founded Pacific Dataworks International. Riggs and Lyndon split up early in 1989.

Lyndon began working on original games with Michael Knox, a co-developer. They secured a deal with DataEast to create PC versions of ABC's Monday Night Football and Dream Team Basketball.

While President of Park Place Productions, one of Lyndon's most notable achievements was as the lead designer/developer of the world's first 3D version of the award-winning video game, John Madden Football. Since that time, Electronic Arts has continued to publish sequel and derivative versions of John Madden Football video games, which have generated $4 billion over more than 25 years. Lyndon left Park Place Productions in light of the company's financial troubles to form Studio Arts Multimedia in 1993, then Left Behind Games in 2001.

== Controversy ==
On September 25, 2013, the United States Securities and Exchange Commission announced that they entered into a regulatory, non-criminal civil lawsuit against Lyndon for violating one or more SEC Rules & Regulations.

The parties' entered into a no-admit, no-deny settlement. Thereafter, Lyndon provided the public with a Quickbooks Enterprise accounting file, representing 10 years of Left Behind Games' "audited" financials to support his opposition.

On January 27, 2020, Lyndon filed a lawsuit based upon his Federal Tort Claim in Troy Alan Lyndon v. USA, Securities & Exchange Commission, Luccee Kirka, Carol Shau and Karen Matteson. On September 25, 2020, Chief Judge J. Michael Seabright determined that the government and its employees could not be sued for the numerous claims alleged by Lyndon, due to the doctrine of sovereign immunity. On November 10, 2021, the Ninth Circuit Court of Appeals affirmed Judge Seabright's order, wherein the doctrine of sovereign immunity protects the government and its employees from claims of wrongdoing. The SEC has not and has never denied Lyndon's allegations.

== Awards ==
Lyndon and Knox were recognized when awarded Inc. magazine "Entrepreneur of the Year" award by Ernst & Young and Merrill Lynch.

== Sources ==
- Forbes Magazine Profile
- Lyndon's rap sheet at MobyGames
- Response to LEFT BEHIND Controversy
- Keynote at Christian Developers Conference
- Supporter of Eastern European Christian Charity
- Game Daily Interview
- Focus on the Family review of Eternal Forces
- "Speaking at Redchip Conference". Market Wire. February 2007. Archived from the original on April 21, 2009 – via FindArticles.
- BBC on Christian Games
- Christian Games & Outreach
- Lyndon on CBN
- "Interactive Advertising". Market Wire. May 2007. Archived from the original on April 21, 2009 – via FindArticles.
- Game Advertising with Double Fusion
- Lyndon Radio Interview by Frank Pastore
- Lyndon on the Mancow Radio Show, May 2, 2008
- Star Rank Boxing
- Last Supper film
- Mr. Do!
- Lyndon on CNBC
