= List of American football video games =

This is a sortable list of American football sports video games.

== Franchises ==
- Arena Football
- Axis Football
- Backyard Football
- Joe Montana Football
- Madden NFL
- EA Sports College Football
- NCAA Gamebreaker
- NFL 2K
- NFL Blitz
- NFL Fever
- NFL GameDay
- NFL Quarterback Club
- NFL Street
- Tecmo Bowl

== Games ==
Title	Release date	Console(s)	Developer	Publisher
10-Yard Fight	1983	Arcade, NES	Nintendo	Nintendo
FTBALL	1965	DTSS	John G. Kemeny	Dartmouth College
4th & Inches	1987	Amiga, Commodore 64, Apple II, Apple IIGS, PC (DOS)		
TV Sports: Football	1988	PC (DOS), Amiga, TurboGrafx-16, Atari ST, Commodore 64	Cinemaware	Cinemaware
ABC Monday Night Football	1989	PC (DOS), Amiga, Commodore 64, Super NES		
All American Football	1989	Arcade	Leland	Leland
All-Pro Football 2K8	2007	PlayStation 3, Xbox 360	Visual Concepts	2K Sports
American Football	1984	ZX Spectrum, Commodore 64, Amstrad CPC	Mind Games	
Arena Football	1988	Commodore 64	Chris R. Bickford III	C159 Production
Arena Football	2006	PlayStation 2, Xbox	EA Sports	
Arena Football: Road to Glory	2007	PlayStation 2	EA Tiburon, Budcat Creations	EA Sports
Axis Football 2016	2016	PC, Android	Axis Games	
Axis Football 17	2017	PC, Android	Axis Games	
Axis Football 18	2018	PC, PlayStation 4, Xbox One, Android	Axis Games	
Backbreaker	2010	PlayStation 3, Xbox 360, iOS, Android	NaturalMotion	505 Games
Backyard Football	1999	Macintosh, Microsoft Windows		
Backyard Football 2002	2001	Macintosh, Microsoft Windows		
Backyard Football	2002	Game Boy Advance, GameCube		
Backyard Football 2004	2003	Microsoft Windows		
Backyard Football 2006	2005	Game Boy Advance, PlayStation 2, Microsoft Windows		
Backyard Sports Football 2007	2006	Game Boy Advance		
Backyard Football '08	2007	Nintendo DS, PlayStation 2, Wii, Microsoft Windows		
Backyard Football '09	2008	Nintendo DS, PlayStation 2, Wii, Microsoft Windows		
Backyard Football '10	2009	PlayStation 2, Wii, Xbox 360		
Backyard Sports: Rookie Rush	2010	Microsoft Windows, Nintendo DS, Wii, Xbox 360		
Bill Walsh College Football	1993	Super NES, Sega Mega Drive/Genesis, Sega [Mega-]CD	Electronic Arts, Visual Concepts	Electronic Arts
Bill Walsh College Football 95	1994	Sega Genesis	High Score Productions	EA Sports
Blitz: The League	2005	PlayStation 2, Xbox, Xbox 360, PlayStation Portable	Midway Games	Midway Games
Blitz: The League II	2008	PlayStation 3, Xbox 360	Midway Games	Midway Games
Black College Football: BCFX: The Xperience	2009	Xbox 360, Microsoft Windows	Nerjyzed Entertainment	Aspyr Media
Brutal Sports Football	1993	Amiga, Jaguar	Millennium Interactive Ltd.	Gremlin Graphics
Capcom's MVP Football	1993	Super NES	Equilibrium	Capcom
College Football USA 96	1995	Sega Genesis	High Score Productions	EA Sports
College Football USA 97	1997	Super NES, Sega Genesis	High Score Productions	EA Sports
Cyberball	1988	Arcade, NES, Mega Drive/Genesis, Atari ST, Atari Lynx, Amiga, Commodore 64, Amstrad CPC, ZX Spectrum, Xbox 360 (XBLA)	Atari Games	Atari Games
Emmitt Smith Football	1995	Super NES	NCM Entertainment	JVC
NFL 2K	1999	Dreamcast	Visual Concepts	Sega and ESPN
NFL 2K1	2000	Dreamcast	Visual Concepts	Sega and ESPN
NFL 2K2	2001	Dreamcast, PlayStation 2, Xbox	Visual Concepts	Sega and ESPN
NFL 2K3	2002	PlayStation 2, Xbox, GameCube	Visual Concepts	Sega and ESPN
ESPN NFL Football	2003	PlayStation 2, Xbox	Visual Concepts	Sega and ESPN
ESPN NFL 2K5	2004	PlayStation 2, Xbox	Visual Concepts	Sega and ESPN
ESPN Sunday Night NFL	1994	SNES, Sega Genesis	Absolute Entertainment	Sony Imagesoft
Football Frenzy	1992	Arcade, Neo Geo	SNK	SNK
Front Page Sports Football	1992	PC (DOS)	Sierra Entertainment	Sierra Entertainment
Goal To Go	1983	Arcade (LaserDisc)	Stern Electronics	Stern Electronics
Grave Yardage	1989	PC (DOS)	Incredible Technologies, Inc.	Activision
Great Football	1987	Master System	Sega	Sega
Head Coach v3	1988	Atari ST	CS Adams	Coda Software
High Impact Football	1991	Arcade	Williams/Midway	
Joe Montana Football	1990	Sega Genesis, Master System, MS-DOS	Electronic Arts	Sega
Montana VR	2017	iOS, Android	Superstar Games	
John Elway's Quarterback	1987	Arcade	Leland Corporation	Virgin Games
John Madden Football	1988	Commodore 64/Commodore 128, Apple II, MS-DOS	Robin Antonick, John Friedman (MS-DOS), Rob Johnson (Commodore), and Bethesda Softworks	Electronic Arts
John Madden Football	1990	Sega Genesis, Super Nintendo Entertainment System, Amiga	Park Place Productions	EA Sports
John Madden Football II	1991	PC	D.C. True, Ltd.	EA Sports
John Madden Football '92	1991	Sega Genesis	Electronic Arts	Electronic Arts
John Madden Football '93	1992	Sega Genesis, Super Nintendo Entertainment System	Electronic Arts	Electronic Arts
Kurt Warner's Arena Football Unleashed	2000	PlayStation		
Legend Bowl	2020	PC, Nintendo Switch, Xbox One, PlayStation 4	Level Ready	Level Ready
Madden NFL '94	1993	Sega Genesis, Super Nintendo Entertainment System	Visual Concepts, High Score Productions	Electronic Arts
Madden NFL '95	1994	Game Boy, Game Gear, Sega Genesis, Super Nintendo Entertainment System	Visual Concepts, Halestorm, High Score Productions, Tiertex	EA Sports, Malibu Interactive, THQ
Madden NFL '96	1995	Game Boy, Game Gear, Microsoft Windows, Sega Genesis, Super Nintendo Entertainment System	Visual Concepts, High Score Productions	EA Sports
Madden NFL 97	1996	Game Boy, Sega Genesis, PlayStation, Sega Saturn, Super Nintendo Entertainment System	EA Tiburon	EA Sports
Madden Football 64	1997	Nintendo 64	EA Tiburon	EA Sports
Madden NFL 98	1997	PlayStation, Sega Saturn, Microsoft Windows, Super Nintendo Entertainment System, Sega Genesis	EA Tiburon	EA Sports
Madden NFL 99	1998	PlayStation, Nintendo 64, Microsoft Windows	EA Tiburon	EA Sports
Madden NFL 2000	1999	PlayStation, Game Boy Color, Nintendo 64, Microsoft Windows, Macintosh	EA Tiburon	EA Sports
Madden NFL 2001	2000	PlayStation, PlayStation 2, Nintendo 64, Game Boy Color, Microsoft Windows	EA Tiburon, 3d6 Games	EA Sports, Electronic Arts Square
Madden NFL 2002	2001	PlayStation, PlayStation 2, Microsoft Windows, Game Boy Color, Nintendo 64, Xbox, GameCube, Game Boy Advance	EA Tiburon, Budcat Creations	EA Sports, Electronic Arts Square
Madden NFL 2003	2002	Game Boy Advance, Microsoft Windows, GameCube, PlayStation, PlayStation 2, Xbox	EA Tiburon, Budcat Creations	EA Sports
Madden NFL 2004	2003	Game Boy Advance, GameCube, Microsoft Windows, PlayStation, PlayStation 2, Xbox	EA Tiburon, Budcat	EA Sports
Madden NFL 2005	2004	GameCube, PlayStation 2, PlayStation, Xbox, Nintendo DS, Microsoft Windows, Game Boy Advance, Tapwave Zodiac	EA Tiburon, Budcat, Exient Entertainment	EA Sports
Madden NFL 06	2005	PlayStation 2, GameCube, Xbox, Xbox 360, Microsoft Windows, Windows Mobile, PlayStation Portable, Game Boy Advance, Nintendo DS, Mobile phone	EA Tiburon, Budcat Creations, Exient Entertainment	EA Sports
Madden NFL 07	2006	PlayStation 2, PlayStation 3, PlayStation Portable, Xbox, Xbox 360, Microsoft Windows, Nintendo DS, Game Boy Advance, Wii, GameCube	EA Tiburon, EA Canada, HB Studios, Exient Entertainment	EA Sports
Madden NFL 08	2007	GameCube, Microsoft Windows, Mobile phone, Nintendo DS, OS X, PC, PlayStation 2, PlayStation 3, PlayStation Portable, Wii, Xbox, Xbox 360	EA Tiburon, Exient Entertainment	EA Sports
Madden NFL 09	2008	PlayStation 2, PlayStation 3, PlayStation Portable, Wii, Xbox 360, Nintendo DS, iOS, BlackBerry	EA Tiburon	EA Sports
Madden NFL 10	2009	Xbox 360, PlayStation 2, PlayStation 3, PlayStation Portable, Wii, Nintendo DS, Mobile phone	EA Tiburon	EA Sports
Madden NFL 11	2010	PlayStation 3, PlayStation 2, Wii, Xbox 360, iOS, PlayStation Portable, BlackBerry	EA Tiburon, EA Canada	EA Sports
Madden NFL Football	2011	Nintendo 3DS	EA Sports	EA Sports
Madden NFL 12	2011	Xbox 360, Wii, PlayStation 2, PlayStation 3, PlayStation Portable, iOS, Android, BlackBerry PlayBook	EA Tiburon	EA Sports
Madden NFL 13	2012	PlayStation 3, PlayStation Vita, Wii, Wii U, Xbox 360	EA Tiburon	EA Sports
Madden NFL 25	2013	PlayStation 3, Xbox 360, PlayStation 4, Xbox One, iOS, Android	EA Tiburon	EA Sports
Madden NFL 15	2014	PlayStation 3, PlayStation 4, Xbox 360, Xbox One	EA Tiburon	EA Sports
Madden NFL Mobile	2014	Android, iOS	EA Mobile	EA Sports
Madden NFL 16	2015	PlayStation 3, PlayStation 4, Xbox 360, Xbox One	EA Tiburon	EA Sports
Madden NFL 17	2016	PlayStation 4, Xbox One, PlayStation 3, Xbox 360	EA Tiburon	EA Sports
Madden NFL 18	2017	PlayStation 4, Xbox One	EA Tiburon	EA Sports
Madden NFL 19	2018	Microsoft Windows, PlayStation 4, Xbox One	EA Tiburon	EA Sports
Maximum Football	2006	PC (Windows)	Wintervalley Software	Matrix Games
Maximum Football 2018	2018	PlayStation 4, Xbox One	Canuck Play Inc.	Spear Interactive
Doug Flutie's Maximum Football 2019	2019	PlayStation 4, Xbox One	Canuck Play Inc.	Spear Interactive
Doug Fluties Maximum Football 2020	2020	PlayStation 4, Xbox One	Canuck Play Inc.	Spear Interactive
MicroLeague Football: The Coach's Challenge	1990	PC (DOS)	MicroLeague Sports Association	MicroLeague Sports Association
Mutant League Football	1993	Mega Drive	Electronic Arts	Electronic Arts
NCAA College Football 2K3	2002	GameCube, Xbox, PlayStation 2	Visual Concepts	Sega
NCAA Football 06	2005	PlayStation 2, Xbox	EA Tiburon	EA Sports
NCAA Football 07	2006	Xbox, Xbox 360, PlayStation 2, PlayStation 3	EA Tiburon	EA Sports
NCAA Football 08	2007	PlayStation 2, Xbox, Xbox 360, PSP	EA Tiburon	EA Sports
NCAA Football 2000	1999	PlayStation	EA Tiburon	EA Sports
NCAA Football 2001	2000	PlayStation	EA Tiburon	EA Sports
NCAA Football 2002	2001	PlayStation 2	EA Tiburon	EA Sports
NCAA Football 2003	2002	PlayStation 2, GameCube, Xbox	EA Tiburon	EA Sports
NCAA Football 2004	2003	Xbox, PlayStation 2, GameCube, N-Gage	EA Tiburon	EA Sports
NCAA Football 2005	2004	PlayStation 2, Xbox, GameCube	EA Tiburon	EA Sports
NCAA Football 98	1997	PlayStation, PC	EA Tiburon	EA Sports
NCAA Football 99	1998	PlayStation, PC	EA Tiburon	EA Sports
NES Play Action Football	1990	NES, Virtual Console	Nintendo	Nintendo
NFL Football	1979	Mattel Intellivision	Mattel	Mattel
NFL Football	1993	SNES	Park Place Productions	Konami
NFL Challenge	1985	PC (DOS)	XOR Software	
NFL '95	1994	Sega Genesis	FarSight Studios/Blue Sky Software	Sega
NFL '97	1996	Sega Saturn		
NFL 2009	2008	Nintendo DS	Gameloft	Gameloft
NFL 2010 (HD)	2009	iOS, Mobile, Palm Pre	Gameloft	Gameloft
NFL 2011 HD	2010	iOS	Gameloft	Gameloft
NFL Pro 2012	2011	iOS	Gameloft	Gameloft
NFL Blitz '99	1998	Game Boy, Arcade		
NFL Blitz 2000	1999	PlayStation, Nintendo 64, Dreamcast, Arcade, Game Boy Color, Windows	Midway	Midway
NFL Challenge	1989	Arcade	LJN	Nintendo
NFL	1989	Nintendo Entertainment System	Enteractive, Inc.	LJN
NFL Fever 2002	2001	Xbox	Microsoft Game Studios	Microsoft Game Studios
NFL Fever 2003	2002	Xbox	Microsoft Game Studios	Microsoft Game Studios
NFL Fever 2004	2003	Xbox	Microsoft Game Studios	Microsoft Game Studios
NFL Football '94 Starring Joe Montana	1993	Sega Genesis		
NFL Quarterback Club 96	1995	SNES, Sega Genesis, Game Boy, Game Gear, Sega Saturn, DOS	Iguana Entertainment, Condor Inc.	Acclaim
NFL Quarterback Club 97	1996	Sega Saturn, PlayStation, DOS, PC	Iguana Entertainment	Acclaim
NFL Quarterback Club 98	1997	Nintendo 64, PlayStation, SNES, Sega Genesis	Iguana Entertainment	Acclaim
NFL Quarterback Club 99	1998	Nintendo 64		
NFL Quarterback Club 2000	1999	Nintendo 64, Dreamcast	Iguana Entertainment	Acclaim
NFL Quarterback Club 2001	2000	Nintendo 64, Dreamcast	High Voltage Software	Acclaim
NFL Quarterback Club 2002	2001	GameCube, PlayStation 2	Acclaim	Acclaim
NFL Sports Talk Football '93	1992	Sega Genesis		
NFL Tour	2008	PlayStation 3, Xbox 360	EA Tiburon	EA Games
PlayMaker Football	1989	Mac OS		
Pro Football Simulation	1989	Amiga	John Saxon	MicroSearch
Quarterback	1987	Arcade		
Quarterback Attack with Mike Ditka	1995	PC (DOS), Sega Saturn, 3DO	Digital Pictures	
Realsports Football	1982	Atari 2600, 5200	Atari	Atari
Retro Bowl	2020	Android, iOS, Nintendo Switch	New Star Games	New Star Games
Rushing Heroes	1997	Arcade	Konami Computer Entertainment Roppongi	Konami
Sterling Sharpe: End 2 End	1995	Super NES		
Sunday Rivals	2020	PC	26k	26k
Super Bowl XX	1986	ZX Spectrum, Commodore 64, Amstrad CPC	Kaos	Ocean
Super Play Action Football	1992	Super NES	Nintendo	Nintendo
Super High Impact	1992	SNES, Sega Genesis	Arena Entertainment/Midway Games	
Tecmo Bowl	1987	Arcade, NES, Game Boy, Mobile Phone, Virtual Console	Tecmo	Tecmo
Tecmo Bowl: Kickoff	2008	Nintendo DS, Virtual Console	Tecmo	Tecmo
Tecmo Super Bowl	1991	NES| SNES, Sega Genesis| PlayStation	Tecmo	Tecmo
Tecmo Super Bowl II: Special Edition	1994	SNES, Sega Genesis	Tecmo	Tecmo
Tecmo Super Bowl III: Final Edition	1995	SNES, Sega Genesis	Tecmo	Tecmo
Troy Aikman NFL Football	1994	Super NES, Sega Genesis, Jaguar	Tradewest	Tradewest
Football	1972	Magnavox Odyssey	Magnavox	Magnavox
Super Action Football (US only, not the same as Super Action Football in Europe, which is based on soccer)	1984	Colecovision	Coleco	Coleco
Football	1978	Bally Astrocade	Bally	Bally
NFL GameDay	1995	PlayStation	989 Sports	989 Sports
NFL GameDay '97	1996	PlayStation	989 Sports	989 Sports
NFL GameDay '98	1997	PlayStation	989 Sports	989 Sports
NFL GameDay '99	1998	PlayStation, PC	989 Sports	989 Sports
NFL GameDay 2000	1999	PlayStation	989 Sports	989 Sports
NFL GameDay 2001	2000	PlayStation, PlayStation 2	989 Sports	989 Sports
NFL GameDay 2002	2001	PlayStation, PlayStation 2	989 Sports	989 Sports
NFL GameDay 2003	2002	PlayStation, PlayStation 2	989 Sports	989 Sports
NFL GameDay 2004	2003	PlayStation, PlayStation 2	989 Sports	989 Sports
NFL GameDay 2005	2004	PlayStation	989 Sports	989 Sports
NFL Xtreme	1998	PlayStation	989 Sports	989 Sports
NFL Xtreme 2	1999	PlayStation	989 Sports	989 Sports
Quick Hit Football	2010	Web Browser	Quick Hit Football	Quick Hit Football
NCAA Football	1994	SNES	Software Toolworks	Mindscape
Maximum Football	2025	Xbox Series X and Series S, Microsoft Windows, MacOS, PlayStation 5	Maximum Entertainment	Maximum Entertainment
College Bowl	2025	Microsoft Windows	Super Pixel Games	Super Pixel Games
Football	1978	Arcade	Atari	Atari
Computer Quarterback	1981	Apple II, Atari 8-bit, Commodore 64	Dan Bunten	Strategic Simulations
Mac Pro Football	1986	Mac OS	David Holt	Avalon Hill
Gridiron Fight	1985	Arcade	Tehkan	Tehkan
