= 1991 in video games =

1991 saw many sequels and prequels in video games, such as Street Fighter II, Final Fantasy IV, Super Castlevania IV, Mega Man 4, Super Ghouls 'n Ghosts, and The Legend of Zelda: A Link to the Past, along with new titles such as Sonic the Hedgehog, Battletoads, Lemmings, Sunset Riders, Duke Nukem, Fatal Fury: King of Fighters, and Streets of Rage. The year's highest-grossing video game worldwide was Capcom's arcade fighting game Street Fighter II. The year's best-selling system was the Game Boy for the second year in a row, while the year's best-selling home video game was Sega's Sonic the Hedgehog, which was also the year's top video game rental in the United States.

== Top-rated games ==
=== Game of the Year awards ===
The following titles won Game of the Year awards for 1991.

Awards	Game of the Year	Developer	Publisher	Genre	Platform(s)	Ref
Chicago Tribune	Sonic the Hedgehog	Sonic Team	Sega	Platformer	Sega Genesis	
Electronic Gaming Monthly (EGM)	Sonic the Hedgehog	Sonic Team	Sega	Platformer	Sega Genesis	
Computer Trade Weekly	Sonic the Hedgehog	Sonic Team	Sega	Platformer	Sega Mega Drive	
European Computer Trade Show (ECTS)	Sonic the Hedgehog	Sonic Team	Sega	Platformer	Sega Mega Drive	
Golden Joystick Awards	Sonic the Hedgehog	Sonic Team	Sega	Platformer	Sega Mega Drive	
Computer Trade Weekly	Sonic the Hedgehog	Ancient	Sega	Platformer	Master System	
Chicago Tribune	Splatterhouse	Namco	NEC	Beat 'em up	TurboGrafx-16	
Chicago Tribune	Super Mario Bros. 3	Nintendo R&D4	Nintendo	Platformer	NES	
Computer Gaming World	Sid Meier's Civilization (Note: Until 1994, Computer Gaming World's eligibility period followed the "commercial year" (June to June) instead of the calendar year. In this instance, the winner for the period June 1991 to June 1992 was released in the 1991 calendar year.)	MicroProse	MicroProse	Strategy	Home computers	
European Computer Trade Show (ECTS)	Lemmings	DMA Design	Psygnosis	Strategy	Home computers	
Famitsu Best Hit Game Awards	Final Fantasy IV	Squaresoft	Squaresoft	Role-playing	Super Famicom	
Gamest Awards	Street Fighter II: The World Warrior	Capcom	Capcom	Fighting	Arcade (CP System)	

=== Famitsu Platinum Hall of Fame ===
The following video game releases in 1991 entered Famitsu magazine's "Platinum Hall of Fame" for receiving Famitsu scores of at least 35 out of 40.

Title	Platform	Developer	Publisher	Genre	Score (out of 40)
Zelda no Densetsu: Kamigami no Triforce (A Link to the Past)	Super Famicom	Nintendo EAD	Nintendo	Action-adventure	39
Final Fantasy IV	Super Famicom	Squaresoft	Squaresoft	Role-playing	36
Lemmings	Super Famicom	Sunsoft	Sunsoft	Strategy	35

== Financial performance ==
=== Highest-grossing arcade games ===
The year's highest-grossing game worldwide was Street Fighter II, which alone accounted for an estimated 60% of the global arcade game market, according to Coinslot magazine. The following table lists the year's top-grossing arcade game in Japan, the United Kingdom, United States, and worldwide.

Market	Title	Hardware sales	Coin drop earnings	Inflation	Manufacturer	Genre	Ref
Japan	Street Fighter II: The World Warrior	17,000	Unknown	Unknown	Capcom	Fighting	
United Kingdom	Street Fighter II: The World Warrior	10,000	$229 million+	$540 million+	Capcom	Fighting	
United States	Street Fighter II: The World Warrior	Unknown	Unknown		Capcom	Fighting	
United States	Teenage Mutant Ninja Turtles	Unknown	Unknown		Konami	Beat 'em up	
Australia	Street Fighter II: The World Warrior	Unknown	Unknown		Capcom	Fighting	
Worldwide	Street Fighter II: The World Warrior	50,000			Capcom	Fighting	

==== Japan ====
In Japan, the following titles were the top ten highest-grossing arcade games of 1991, according to the annual Gamest and Game Machine charts.

Rank	Gamest	Game Machine	
Rank	Gamest	Title	Type
1	Street Fighter II: The World Warrior	Street Fighter II: The World Warrior	Software conversion kit
2	Final Fight	Tetris (Sega)	Software conversion kit
3	Final Lap 2	Columns	Software conversion kit
4	Quiz Tonosama no Yabō	Final Lap 2	Standard cabinet
5	Raiden	Final Lap 2	Deluxe cabinet
6	Super Monaco GP	Super Volley '91 (Power Spikes)	Software conversion kit
7	Clutch Hitter	Quiz Tonosama no Yabō	Software conversion kit
8	GP Rider	Final Fight	Software conversion kit
9	Super Volley '91 (Power Spikes)	World Stadium '90	Software conversion kit
10	Dragon Saber	Columns II	Software conversion kit

==== United States ====
In the United States, the following titles were the highest-grossing arcade video games of 1991.

Rank	AAMA		AMOA		Play Meter
Rank	Title	Award	Arcade conversion kit	Dedicated arcade cabinet	Play Meter
1	Street Fighter II: The World Warrior	Diamond	Street Fighter II	Teenage Mutant Ninja Turtles	Teenage Mutant Ninja Turtles
2	The Simpsons, Neo Geo MVS	Platinum	Capcom Bowling, Final Fight, High Impact Football, Raiden	Hard Drivin', Neo Geo MVS, Pit Fighter, Race Drivin'	Unknown
3	The Simpsons, Neo Geo MVS	Platinum	Capcom Bowling, Final Fight, High Impact Football, Raiden	Hard Drivin', Neo Geo MVS, Pit Fighter, Race Drivin'	Unknown
4	High Impact Football	Gold	Capcom Bowling, Final Fight, High Impact Football, Raiden	Hard Drivin', Neo Geo MVS, Pit Fighter, Race Drivin'	Unknown
5	Final Lap 2	Silver	Capcom Bowling, Final Fight, High Impact Football, Raiden	Hard Drivin', Neo Geo MVS, Pit Fighter, Race Drivin'	Unknown

==== Hong Kong and Australia ====
In Hong Kong and Australia, the following titles were the top-grossing arcade games on the monthly charts in 1991.

Month	Hong Kong (Bondeal)						Australia (Timezone)		
Month	Arcade conversion software kit		Dedicated arcade cabinet			Ref	Dedicated	Conversion	Ref
January	Super Pang		Big Run	Cisco Heat			Unknown	Unknown	
February	Escape Kids	Street Fighter II	Cisco Heat	Hard Drivin'	Big Run		Unknown	Unknown	
March	Street Fighter II		Hard Drivin'	Big Run	F-15 Strike Eagle		Unknown	Unknown	
April	Street Fighter II	Gun Force	F-15 Strike Eagle				Unknown	Unknown	
May	Street Fighter II		F-15 Strike Eagle		Hard Drivin'		Unknown	Unknown	
June	Street Fighter II		Hard Drivin'				Unknown	Unknown	
July	Street Fighter II	Mutant Fighter	Hard Drivin'				Unknown	Unknown	
August	Mutant Fighter	D. D. Crew	Hard Drivin'		Time Traveler		Unknown	Unknown	
September	WWF WrestleFest	Street Fighter II	Time Traveler		Hard Drivin'		Unknown	Unknown	
October	Street Fighter II	Vendetta	Hard Drivin'	Race Drivin'			Final Lap 2	Spider-Man	
1991							Street Fighter II		

=== Best-selling home systems ===
Rank	System(s)	Manufacturer	Type	Generation	Sales				
Rank	System(s)	Manufacturer	Type	Generation	Japan	USA	Europe	Korea	Worldwide
1	Game Boy	Nintendo	Handheld	8-bit	1,940,000	4,000,000	1,400,000	Unknown	7,340,000+
2	Super NES	Nintendo	Console	16-bit	3,150,000	1,900,000+	—N/a	—N/a	5,050,000+
3	NES / Famicom	Nintendo	Console	8-bit	1,240,000	2,100,000	500,000+	100,000	3,940,000+
4	Mega Drive / Genesis	Sega	Console	16-bit	700,000	1,600,000+	815,000	51,000	3,166,000+
5	IBM PC	IBM	Computer	16-bit	—N/a	—N/a	—N/a	—N/a	2,910,000
6	Macintosh	Apple Inc.	Computer	16-bit	—N/a	—N/a	—N/a	—N/a	2,100,000
7	Master System	Sega	Console	8-bit	Unknown	< 50,000	1,745,000	160,000	1,905,000+
8	NEC PC-88 / PC-98	NEC	Computer	8-bit / 16-bit	1,720,000	Unknown	Unknown	Unknown	1,720,000+
9	Game Gear	Sega	Handheld	8-bit	400,000	600,000+	520,000	Unknown	1,520,000+
10	Amiga	Commodore	Computer	16-bit	—N/a	—N/a	—N/a	—N/a	1,035,000

=== Best-selling home video games ===
Sonic the Hedgehog was the best-selling home video game of 1991, with 2 million copies sold worldwide during the year.

==== Japan ====
In Japan, according to Famicom Tsūshin (Famitsu) magazine, the following titles were the top ten best-selling 1991 releases, including later sales in 1992.

Rank	Title	Developer	Publisher	Genre	Platform	Sales
1	Zelda no Densetsu: Kamigami no Triforce (A Link to the Past)	Nintendo EAD	Nintendo	Action-adventure	Super Famicom	< 1,160,000
2	Final Fantasy IV (Final Fantasy II)	Squaresoft	Squaresoft	Role-playing	Super Famicom	Unknown
3	Yoshi	Game Freak	Nintendo	Puzzle	Famicom	Unknown
4	Yoshi	Game Freak	Nintendo	Puzzle	Game Boy	Unknown
5	Ganbare Goemon: Yukihime Kyūshutsu Emaki (Mystical Ninja)	Konami	Konami	Action-adventure	Super Famicom	Unknown
6	SaGa 3: Jikū no Hasha (Final Fantasy Legend III)	Squaresoft	Squaresoft	Role-playing	Game Boy	< 650,000
7	Chō Makaimura (Super Ghouls 'n Ghosts)	Capcom	Capcom	Action-platformer	Super Famicom	Unknown
8	SimCity	Nintendo EAD	Nintendo	City-building	Super Famicom	Unknown
9	Super Wagan Land	Namco		Platformer	Super Famicom	Unknown
10	Super Formation Soccer (Super Soccer)	Human Entertainment		Sports (football)	Super Famicom	< 600,000

The following titles were the best-selling home video games on the Famitsu charts in 1991. The charts were bi-weekly up until July 1991, when they switched to a weekly format.

Month	Week 1	Week 2	Week 3	Week 4	Ref
January	Unknown		Super Mario World (Super Famicom)		
February	Super Mario World (Super Famicom)				
March	Super Mario World (Super Famicom)				
April	Ultraman (Super Famicom)		Super Mario World (Super Famicom)		
May	Super Mario World (Super Famicom)		SimCity (Super Famicom)		
June	SimCity (Super Famicom)		Magical Taruruto (Game Boy)		
July	SimCity (Super Famicom)	Super R-Type (SFC)	Final Fantasy IV (Super Famicom)		
August	Unknown	Unknown	Final Fantasy IV (SFC)	Dragon Ball Z II: Gekishin Freeza (FC)	
September	Final Fantasy IV (Super Famicom)		Chibi Maruko-chan 2 (GB)	Mario Open Golf (Famicom)	
October	Chō Makaimura (Super Famicom)				
November	Chō Makaimura (Super Famicom)	Akumajō Dracula (SFC)	Super Mario World (SFC)	Zelda no Densetsu: Kamigami no Triforce (SFC)	
December	Zelda no Densetsu: Kamigami no Triforce (SFC)	Mega Man 4 (FC)	SaGa 3 (Game Boy)		

==== United Kingdom ====
In the United Kingdom, the following titles were the best-selling home video games on the monthly Computer and Video Games (CVG) charts in 1991.

Month	Home computers	Sega Mega Drive	PC Engine	Ref
January	Teenage Mutant Hero Turtles (C64)	Castle of Illusion Starring Mickey Mouse	Out Run	
February	Speedball 2: Brutal Deluxe (Amiga)	Castle of Illusion Starring Mickey Mouse	Out Run	
March	Lemmings (Amiga)	Gynoug	Parasol Stars	
April	Magicland Dizzy (ZX Spectrum)	Midnight Resistance	Parasol Stars	
May	Magicland Dizzy (ZX Spectrum)	Midnight Resistance	Parasol Stars	
June	Magicland Dizzy (ZX Spectrum)	Sonic the Hedgehog	Legend of Hero Tonma	
July	Bubble Bobble (ZX Spectrum)	Sonic the Hedgehog	—N/a	
August	Manchester United Europe	—N/a	—N/a	
September	Jimmy White's 'Whirlwind' Snooker	Streets of Rage	PC Kid 2	
October	Terminator 2: Judgment Day	Mercs	Hit the Ice	
November	Lotus Turbo Challenge 2	QuackShot	Time Cruise II	
December	WWF WrestleMania	RoboCod	Gradius	

==== United States ====
In the United States, the following titles were the top three best-selling home video game releases of 1991.

Rank	Title	Platform	Sales	Ref
1	Sonic the Hedgehog	Sega Genesis	1,000,000+	
2	Super Mario World	Super Nintendo Entertainment System	Unknown	
3	F-Zero	Super Nintendo Entertainment System	Unknown	

The following titles were the best-selling home video games of each month in 1991.

Month	All platforms			Nintendo consoles				
Month	Title	Platform	Ref	Week 1	Week 2	Week 3	Week 4	Ref
May	Unknown	Unknown		Super Mario Bros. 3 (NES)				
June	Unknown	Unknown		Super Mario Bros. 3 (NES)				
August	Sonic the Hedgehog	Sega Genesis		Unknown	Unknown	Unknown	Unknown	
September	Sonic the Hedgehog	Sega Genesis		Unknown	Tetris (NES)	Super Mario World (Super NES)	Unknown	
October	Sonic the Hedgehog	Sega Genesis		Super Mario World (Super NES)				
November	Sonic the Hedgehog	Sega Genesis		Unknown				
December	Sonic the Hedgehog	Sega Genesis		Super Mario World (Super NES)				

== Events ==
=== Notable releases ===
- January - The first two THQ releases came out in stores.
- February 14 – DMA Design releases Lemmings, a puzzle game that requires the player to lead a group of anthropomorphic lemmings through a dangerous environment to an escape portal.
- March – AOL, SSI, TSR and Stormfront Studios collaborate and launch Neverwinter Nights, credited as the first graphical MMORPG.
- March 7 – Capcom releases Street Fighter II for arcades. It becomes highly successful and is routinely listed as the grandfather of the fighting game genre. It is also credited with revitalizing the arcade game industry at the time, and popularizing direct tournament-level competition between players.
- May 6 – Sierra On-Line releases The Sierra Network, which is also credited as the first graphical MMORPG (due to its inclusion of The Shadow of Yserbius), TSN would later become its more memorable name, ImagiNation Network, after a total buyout from AT&T in 1994.
- June 23 – Sega releases Sonic the Hedgehog for the Sega Genesis which later becomes the pack-in game and defining title for the console. It introduces the eponymous character, who would go on to be Sega's mascot. Sega also releases a version of the game for the Master System and Game Gear.
- July 19 – Square releases Final Fantasy IV in Japan, the first Final Fantasy game for the Super Famicom (released in November as Final Fantasy II in North America).
- August 13 – Intelligent Systems releases SimCity for the Super Nintendo Entertainment System.
- August 23 – Nintendo releases Super Mario World and F-Zero along with the Super Nintendo Entertainment System in North America. Super Mario World was the original pack-in game for the SNES. The game introduces the Yoshi character to the Mario series.
- September – Namco releases Starblade for arcades, featuring one of the earliest instances of real-time 3D graphics in video games.
- September – Electronic Arts releases motorcycle racing combat game Road Rash for Sega Genesis, starting the series.
- October 14 - Nintendo releases Mario The Juggler, the final Game & Watch title.
- November – Nintendo releases Metroid II: Return of Samus for the Game Boy in North America.
- November – Delphine Software releases cinematic action-adventure game Another World for the Amiga, which uses polygons instead of sprites.
- November 21 – Nintendo releases The Legend of Zelda: A Link to the Past for the Super Famicom in Japan.
- November 25 – SNK releases Fatal Fury: King of Fighters for the Neo Geo.
- December 1 – LucasArts releases Monkey Island 2: LeChuck's Revenge for Amiga, MS-DOS, Macintosh, and FM Towns.
- December 4 – Konami releases Super Castlevania IV for SNES in North America.
- December 6 – Mega Man 4 is released in Japan.
- December 13 – Tecmo releases Tecmo Super Bowl for NES, the follow-up to 1989's Tecmo Bowl.
- December 16 – MicroProse releases Civilization. As of 2005, it is still Sid Meier's most successful game.
- Team17 release Alien Breed, the first of the series, for the Amiga.

=== Hardware ===
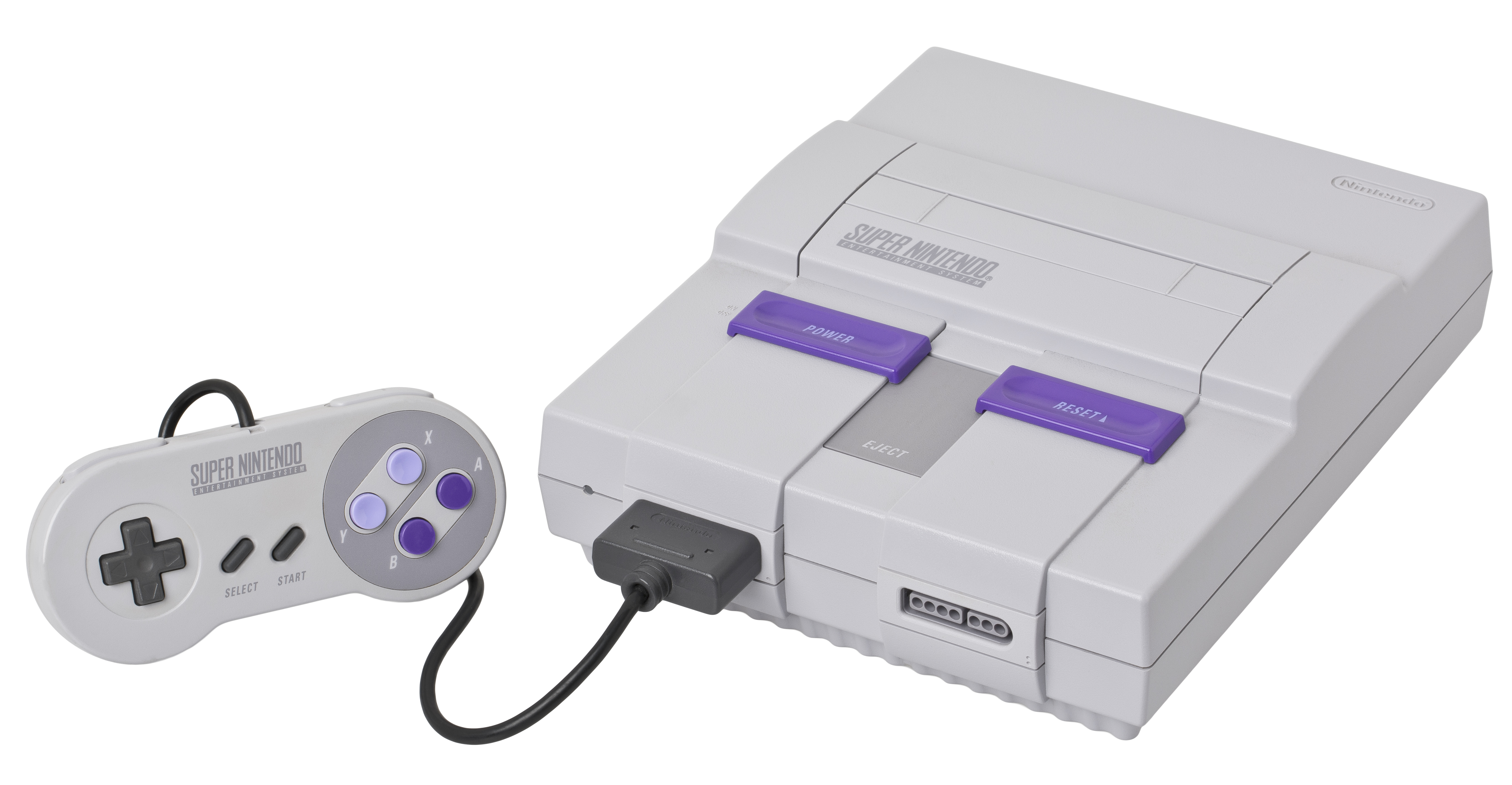
Super Nintendo Entertainment System, the North American version of the Super Famicom.

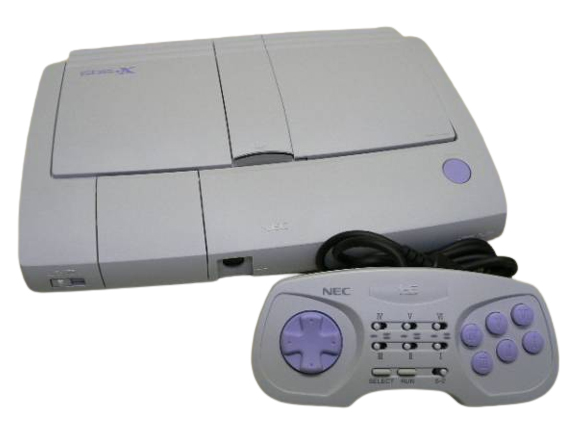
PC Engine Duo

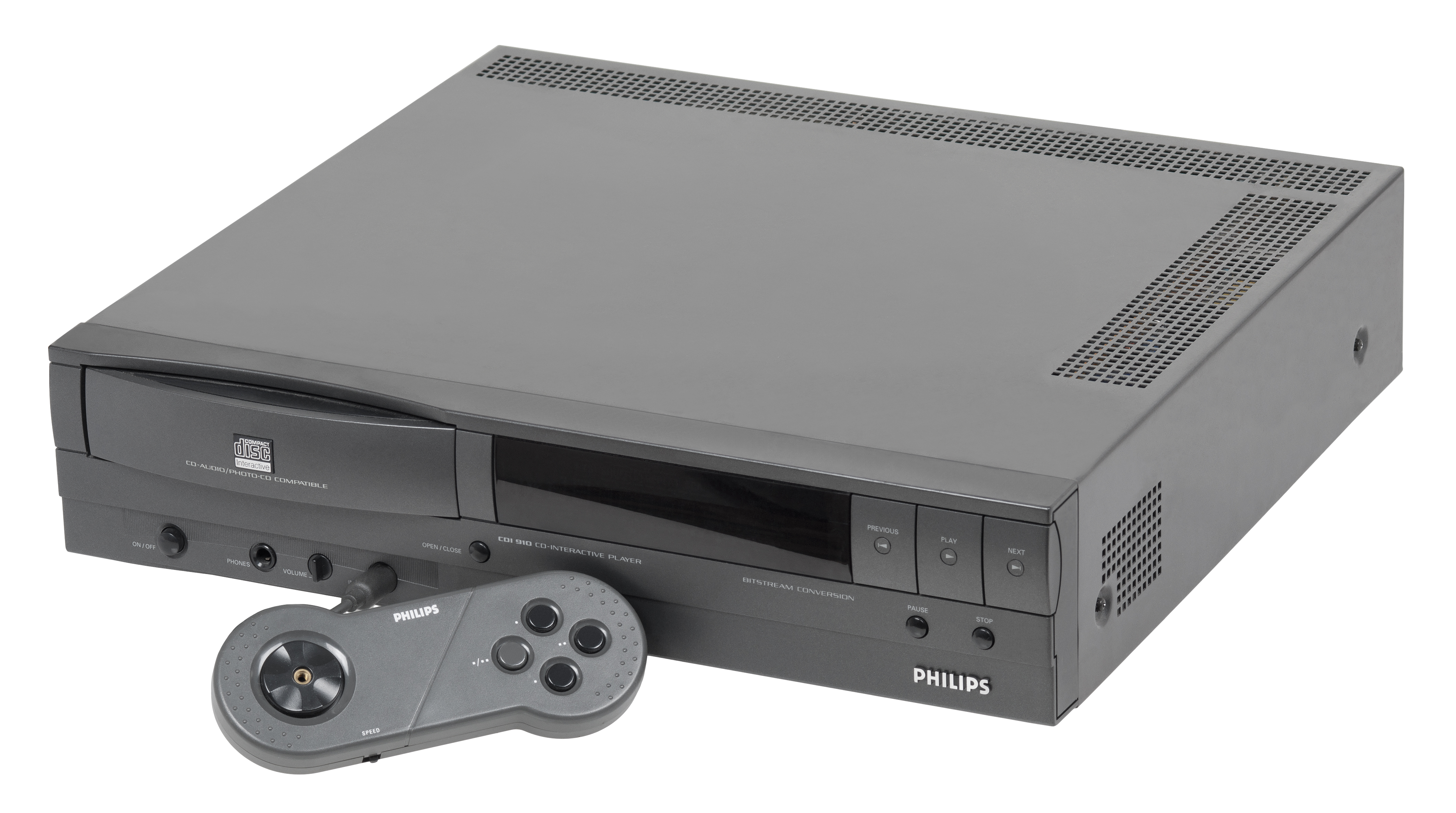
Philips CD-i

- July – Atari updates their Lynx handheld system with a smaller form-factor, better screen, and longer battery life.
- August 23 – The Super Famicom released in North America as the Super Nintendo Entertainment System.
- September – S3 launches with the 86C911, often regarded as the first significant graphics accelerator chip for the Microsoft Windows platform.
- September 21 - NEC released the PC Engine Duo in Japan.
- December 3 - The Philips CD-i initially released in North America, it is considered to be one of the absolute worst video game consoles of all time.
- December 12 – Sega releases the Mega-CD in Japan.

== Business ==
- New companies: Vicarious Visions, Inc, id Software, Bungie, Silicon & Synapse (now known as Blizzard Entertainment), The 3DO Company (founded as SMSG, Inc.), Cyberdreams
- In August, Game Informer (a monthly video game magazine) is released for the first time.

== See also ==
- 1991 in games
