= Tecmo Super NBA Basketball =

1992 video game

- North American SNES box art featuring the Chicago Bulls and the Milwaukee Bucks
- Developer: Sculptured Software
- Publisher: Tecmo
- Designer: Dwain Skinner
- Composer: George Sanger
- Platforms: Super NES, Sega Genesis
- Release: Super NES: JP: December 25, 1992; NA: March 11, 1993; EU: 1993; Genesis: NA: December 1993; JP: March 4, 1994
- Genre: Sports (basketball)
- Modes: Single-player, multiplayer

Tecmo Super NBA Basketball (テクモスーパーNBAバスケットボール) is a basketball video game developed by Sculptured Software for the Super NES. The game is the SNES equivalent of the original Tecmo NBA Basketball. It also came out a year later (with updated rosters) for the Sega Genesis.

== Summary ==
The game consists of all NBA teams from the 1991–92 season (despite its release during the 1992–93 season; the New York Knicks changed their logo after the 91–92 season). Players can choose from exhibition games, the 1992 All-Star Game, or the 1992-93 season. In playing the season, players can choose which teams they want to control; for example, a player can choose to play as two teams, and will play every game those two teams play.

In the Super NES version, Michael Jordan and Reggie Lewis are selectable players in the Bulls and Celtics rosters, respectively, but in the Sega Genesis version they are replaced for "Guard Bulls" and "Forward Celtics" players.

The game is also one of the few from the 16-bit generation where it is possible to watch every single game instead of playing only with the selected team.

Tecmo Super NBA Basketball is the only NBA game ever produced by Tecmo for the Super NES. Unpopular reviews and overall gameplay led to this game being released the following year on the Sega Genesis only.

== Reception ==
Reception

Review scores
Publication	Score
Nintendo Acción	3.75/4
Superplay	86 %
Nintendo Power	3.625/5

Tecmo had a vast reputation to try and live up to with their famous Tecmo Super Bowl video game, and they disappointed with this game according to various reviews. A review on namogamo.com states that the biggest issue with this video game was the constant fouling, poorly timed screens and errant passes.

Another review by sportsvideogamesreviews.com, agrees with the prior sentiments in stating that the players behave like "machines" and simply pass the ball around until one finds an open jump-shot. Add all of those up and it becomes obvious this was more of a task than fun activity.

This is also one of the last video games to include Michael Jordan during his playing career.
