= Tecmo NBA Basketball =

1992 video game

- Official cover featuring the Portland Trail Blazers visiting the Los Angeles Clippers
- Developer: Sculptured Software
- Publisher: Tecmo
- Designer: Dwain Skinner
- Composers: George Sanger; Paul Webb
- Platform: Nintendo Entertainment System
- Release: NA: November 1992
- Genre: Sports
- Modes: Single-player, multiplayer

Tecmo NBA Basketball is a basketball video game that was released by Tecmo for the Nintendo Entertainment System.

Like Tecmo Super Bowl and Tecmo Bowl before it, the game features cinema-style cutscenes during gameplay. There is an option to play an all-star game, but unlike with Tecmo Super Bowl, there is no option to select the players on the All-Star teams. Tecmo also released a version of the game for the Super NES and Genesis, titled Tecmo Super NBA Basketball. This is the first basketball video game to feature an official license from both the NBA and the NBPA players union (however, it was not the first basketball video game to have a license from the NBA; that distinction went to Intellivision's NBA Basketball in 1980).

The game features an appearance from Michael Jordan and all current NBA teams and players from the 1991–92 NBA season. The Los Angeles Lakers team features Magic Johnson despite his not actually playing in the NBA during that season (he had announced his retirement early in the season, having never played a game in the 1991–92 season). Larry Bird, who played his last NBA game in 1992, also appears, as a member of the Boston Celtics.

== Sequel ==
Tecmo had received the NBA license again in 2009, and thereafter made NBA Unrivaled. The game was developed by A.C.R.O.N.Y.M. Games and published by Tecmo.
