= 10-Yard Fight =

1983 video game

- North American arcade flyer
- Developer: Irem
- Publishers: Irem: Arcade; JP: Irem; NA/SA: Taito; EU: Electrocoin; DE: ADP Automaten GmbH NES; JP: Irem; NA/EU: Nintendo
- Producer: Gunpei Yokoi (NES)
- Platforms: Arcade, NES, MSX
- Release: December 5, 1983: Arcade; JP: December 5, 1983; NA: March 1984; EU: 1984 NES; JP: August 30, 1985; NA: October 18, 1985; EU: December 6, 1986 MSX; JP: 1986
- Genres: Sports (American football)
- Modes: Single-player, multiplayer
- Arcade system: Irem M-58 hardware

10-Yard Fight (Note: Japanese: 10ヤードファイト, Hepburn: Ten Yādo Faito) is a 1983 American football video game developed and published by Irem for arcades. It was released by Taito in North America, Electrocoin in Europe, and ADP Automaten in West Germany. A port developed by Tose for the Nintendo Entertainment System was released in 1985 by Irem in Japan and Nintendo internationally.

== Gameplay ==
Screenshot of the arcade version

10-Yard Fight is viewed in a top-down perspective and is vertical scrolling. The player does not select plays for either offense or defense. On offense, the player simply receives the ball upon the snap and either attempts to run with the quarterback, toss the ball to a running back, or throw the ball to the long distance receiver, essentially the option offense. On defense, the player picks one of two players to control, and the computer manipulates the others. The ball can also be punted or a field goal can be attempted.

The game has five levels of difficulty: high school, college, professional, playoff, and Super Bowl. If the player wins both halves of an "accelerated real time" 30-minute half at an easier level, they advance to the next level of difficulty.

The player scores 20,000 points for any kickoff that is returned for a touchdown.

== Ports ==
The arcade game was published to the Famicom by Irem first in Japan, and later in North America and Europe by Nintendo in 1985 and 1986 respectively for the Nintendo Entertainment System (NES). The arcade game was also ported to the MSX home computer by Irem, but only in Japan.

While graphically similar, there are some fundamental differences between the arcade and NES versions. The arcade version only seeks to simulate the offense, with the team attempting to score a touchdown, which ultimately leads the player to the next level. The NES version was developed to allow both offense and defense, as well as a simultaneous 2-player mode.

10-Yard Fight was, along with Kung Fu, one of only two NES launch titles not originally developed by Nintendo. Both games were developed initially for arcades by Irem. Although Nintendo developed the NES port of Kung Fu, Irem handled the system's port of 10-Yard Fight.

The arcade version was released in May 2018 by Hamster Corporation as part of their Arcade Archives series.

== Reception ==
In Japan, Game Machine listed 10-Yard Fight as the top-grossing new table arcade cabinet of December 1983. It later topped the magazine's table arcade game chart in March 1984.

The Pittsburgh Post-Gazette called it the "patriarch of football games". Adam Duerson of Sports Illustrated stated that while nobody remembered it or could say what makes it great, it is worth recognition because it brought football games out of the Atari era, setting a simple precedent for future football games. Adam Swiderski of UGO Networks called it "downright advanced" compared to earlier football titles. He added that while it looked neat and had a quality soundtrack, it did not play like "real football". N-Sider called it more like a racing game than a football game, due to the objective being to race for a first down to increase players' time. Author Bj Klein, however, called it less realistic than Tecmo Bowl. The Journal News called it an "immortal classic".

== See also ==
- Gridiron Fight
