= Madden NFL 97 =

1996 video game

- North American PlayStation box art
- Developers: Tiburon Entertainment (PS, Saturn, SNES); Stormfront Studios (DOS/Windows); High Score Productions (Genesis); Tiertex (GB)
- Publisher: EA Sports
- Series: Madden NFL
- Platforms: PlayStation, MS-DOS, Sega Saturn, Windows, Genesis/Mega Drive, Super NES, Game Boy
- Release: September 10, 1996: PlayStation; NA: September 10, 1996; EU: October 4, 1996 MS-DOS, Saturn, Windows; NA: September 26, 1996; EU: October 16, 1996 Genesis/Mega Drive; NA: October 1996; EU: 1996 Super NES; NA: October 1996 Game Boy; NA: November 1996
- Genres: Sports (American football)
- Modes: Single-player, multiplayer

Madden NFL 97 is an American football video game released in 1996. It was the first Madden game released for the PlayStation and Sega Saturn. 16-bit versions were also made for the established Super NES and Sega Genesis platforms, as well as a portable version for the Game Boy.

This is the first edition of Madden to implement a salary cap when customizing team rosters. It also features the new Baltimore Ravens, formerly the Cleveland Browns for the 1996 season. The game also adds a team of real free agents (as opposed to the blank slate used in Madden NFL '96), which can be traded and added to other teams' rosters (led by recently semi-retired quarterback Randall Cunningham), and can be played by using a cheat code.

Madden NFL 97 was the best-selling PlayStation game of 1996.

== Development ==
The player graphics were created by using 3D models with motion capture data to produce 2D sprites from multiple angles.

Classic teams were once again used, although most were different from the previous year's teams; the years ranged as far back as 1952 (Detroit Lions) and as recent as 1990 (Buffalo Bills). Jacksonville and Carolina, once again, did not get classic teams, but Baltimore was attached to a classic Cleveland Browns team.

The best team in the overall ranking, with a score of 85 was the Dallas Cowboys and the worst team with a score of 62 was the Baltimore Ravens. The best ranked offenses were between the Cowboys and the Lions with a score of 92. The St. Louis Rams had the best ranked defense with an 86. The Miami Dolphins had the best ranked special teams with a 93.

== Reception ==
Reception

Aggregate score
Aggregator	Score
GameRankings	86% (PS1)

Review scores
Publication	Score
AllGame	3/5 (SNES); 3/5 (PS1); 4/5 (SS)
Electronic Gaming Monthly	9.1/10 (PS)
GameSpot	6.4/10 (PC)
Next Generation	4/5 (PS)
PlayStation: The Official Magazine	8/10
Sega Saturn Magazine	92% (SS)

Critics hailed the PlayStation version as a strong comeback for the series after the cancellation of the PlayStation version of Madden NFL '96, citing outstanding gameplay, graphics, and options. The two sports reviewers of Electronic Gaming Monthly (EGM) were pleased that all the teams are available from the beginning, as opposed to having some teams unlocked via hidden codes as in earlier installments. GamePro wrote that "Madden PlayStation is not only the best football game on the market today, it's the best 32-bit sports game, period." Next Generation was particularly impressed by the control and skill demanded by the gameplay, though they criticized that the AI can be consistently beaten by one specific play, something they said had always held back the Madden games from being as outstanding in single-player mode as they are in multiplayer. EGM named the PlayStation version a runner-up for Sports Game of the Year (behind Wave Race 64).

Reviewing the Saturn version, GamePro praised the gameplay, playbook, animations, sound effects, and "full-motion video that looks TV-real, even with its typically Saturn graininess." Paul Glancey of Sega Saturn Magazine echoed Next Generation's criticism that the AI can always be beaten by one play, but recommended the game on the basis of the large selection of teams, motion captured animation, and combination of strategy and action.

GamePro was much less pleased with the Super NES version. They said that while the game is good in absolute terms, with a wide selection of moves and attention to detail in the backgrounds, it is inferior to Madden NFL '96 due to its weak AI even on the hardest skill level, slower gameplay, awkward graphics and animations, and limited number of voice clips from Madden. GamePro called the Genesis version "an immensely enjoyable game with great action and stat-soaked strategy", going so far as to suggest that it made buying a next generation system unnecessary for football enthusiasts. They particularly praised the fact that the game is not a simple update for the series and offers new features and more realistic graphics.

GamePro's brief review of the Game Boy version criticized the overly small ball and players, prominent slowdown, and lack of any licensing apart from Madden himself, but praised the realistic plays and strategy.

It was #4 on PC Data's monthly PC games sales chart for December 1996.

In the United States, the PlayStation and Sega Saturn versions of Madden NFL 97 ranked third and fourth, respectively, on a video game sales chart published in the December 1996 issue of Swedish magazine Super Play. The game was the highest grossing Sega Saturn game in the US.
