= NES Play Action Football =

1990 video game

- Box art
- Developer: Tose
- Publisher: Nintendo of America
- Platforms: Nintendo Entertainment System, Game Boy
- Release: NES: NA: September 1990; Game Boy: NA: December 1990
- Genre: Sports
- Modes: Single-player, multiplayer

NES Play Action Football is a football video game developed by Tose and published by Nintendo for the Nintendo Entertainment System. It was released in 1990 in North America only. The game was also ported to the Game Boy as Play Action Football, and received a follow-up on the Super NES titled Super Play Action Football in 1992 in North America only. It was released on the Wii Virtual Console in North America on September 10, 2007. The Virtual Console version was available as a Club Nintendo bonus download from August 19 to September 2, 2012.

== Overview ==
NES Play Action Football allows players to choose from eight teams from various cities. For licensing reasons, the original game features only the city rather than the actual name of each NFL team and only the surnames and numbers (although a comprehensive set down to various position-specific levels on each depth chart) of actual players that were currently playing for the corresponding NFL team during the 1989 NFL season: Los Angeles, Denver, San Francisco, Washington, Miami, New York, Chicago, and Houston. In the Virtual Console re-release, references to the National Football League Players Association were removed, and players were given fictitious names, though their stats, numbers, and face graphics were unchanged.

The game used an isometric view, presenting the game at an angle to make it appear 3-D, and the game allowed a very large number of moving objects (all the players) to be on screen at the same time. Another feature was the use of primitive digitized voices for such actions as "Touchdown!" or "First down!" and "Ready! Set! Hut, hut.." before the play begins. At the end of each game, Nintendo Power mascot character Nester appears as a commentator, announcing who wins and who loses.

The game was one of the few games that supported the NES Satellite and NES Four Score four controller adapters. To allow teammates to select plays without showing the competitors, it included a NES Play Action Football 4 player play card. The teammates could point to the plays they were going to pick on the card, and then enter the combination on-screen without the opposition knowing.
