= All American Football =

1989 video game

- Developer: Leland Corporation
- Publisher: Leland Corporation
- Platform: Arcade
- Release: 1989
- Genre: Sports game
- Mode: Up to 4 players

All American Football is a 4-player American football arcade game released by Leland in 1989.

== Gameplay ==
One of the main differences between it, and its predecessor, John Elway's Team Quarterback is that it was the first (and possibly, only coin-op game) to allow users to select from a list of "college" teams in addition to "pro" teams representing the 26 cities/regions which had NFL teams at the time. It is also the only game in the series to allow users to purchase power-up items such as "beef" (for boosting the offensive line) and "go juice" (for a second wind on long gains) from a "sideline shop" during the game.

Screenshot of All American Football

The game did not have licenses from the NFL, NFLPA or the NCAA. Because of this, pro teams were only referred to by city (Green Bay, Pittsburgh, etc.), state (Minnesota) or region (New England). Most of the college teams featured were ones with names that were based geographically (Michigan, Wisconsin, etc.) or militaristic (Army and Navy). This feature was purely cosmetic as the teams all played the same regardless of which one was chosen. It also allowed users to choose their own team colors no matter which team they chose.

Like its predecessors, All-American Football involved the use of a "spring stick," which required players to aim passes and kicks, making for more realistic gameplay.

== Series ==
- 1. Quarterback (1987)
- 2. John Elway's Team Quarterback (1988)
- 3. All American Football (1989)
