= NFL (video game) =

1989 video game

- Developer: Atlus
- Publisher: LJN
- Composer: Hirohiko Takayama
- Platform: Nintendo Entertainment System
- Release: NA: September 1989
- Genre: Sports (American football)
- Modes: Single-player, multiplayer

NFL is a 1989 American football video game developed by Atlus and published by LJN for the Nintendo Entertainment System.

== Gameplay modes ==
The game uses an overhead view of the on-field action.

This game was the first since NFL Football (released in 1979 for the Intellivision) to get an official NFL license. Intending to loosely represent the 1988 NFL season, the game uses the teams and play formations of that particular era while avoiding usage of the players' names, due to a lack of an NFLPA license, which was given to Tecmo's Tecmo Bowl.

The player could play one of four options, either Interconference, AFC and NFC game or the Super Bowl (specifically Super Bowl XXIII). Along with the option to choose a package to play during the game, players can directly control the entire team at once. This game was one of the first NFL video games on a gaming system. The game employs a Top-Down system for the actual gameplay and allows players to assign handicaps to a human opponent that is not as skilled as they are.

== Reception ==
Allgame gave the game a 2.5 out of 5 rating in their overview.
