= Troy Aikman NFL Football =

1994 video game

- North American SNES cover art by Debra Austin
- Developers: Leland Interactive Media; Telegames (Jaguar)
- Publishers: Williams Entertainment (Note: Released under the Tradewest brand name on Super NES and Genesis): Super NES; EU: Sony Electronic Publishing Jaguar; JP: Messe Sansao, Inc.
- Director: Kevin Lydy
- Producer: Michael Abbot
- Designers: Gary Luecker; John Stookey; Michael Abbot
- Programmers: Brian Johnson; David Schwartz; Michael Hunley
- Artists: Andrew E. Wilson; Bert Farache; David Ellingson
- Writers: Shawn Murphy; Steve High
- Composer: Robert Atesalp
- Platforms: Atari Jaguar; Sega Genesis; Super NES
- Release: August 1994: Super NES; NA: August 1994; EU: 1994 Genesis; NA: October 1994 Jaguar; NA: February 1, 1995; EU: May 1995; JP: July 1995
- Genre: Sports
- Modes: Single-player, multiplayer

Troy Aikman NFL Football is an American football video game originally developed by Leland Interactive Media and published by Williams Entertainment (credited under the Tradewest name) for the Super Nintendo Entertainment System first in North America in August 1994. Officially licensed from the National Football League, it prominently features former NFL player Troy Aikman, who became the first member of the Dallas Cowboys to have his namesake in a game, followed by his teammate Emmitt Smith in Emmitt Smith Football.

In Troy Aikman NFL Football, players have the choice to compete in matches across any of the game modes available with either AI-controlled opponents or against other human players. Initially launched for the Super Nintendo, it was then released on the Sega Genesis a few months after the original version and was later ported to the Atari Jaguar in the following year.

Troy Aikman NFL Football garnered mixed reception since it was released for the SNES and Genesis from critics and reviewers alike, as they felt divided towards various aspects of the title such as the graphics, sound and gameplay, while the Jaguar version also received the same general reception and was criticized for its similarity with the 16-bit versions, in addition of also being compared with the John Madden Football series from Electronic Arts. Ports for the Macintosh and PC were also in development but never published.

== Gameplay ==
Screenshot of the SNES version showcasing a match between the Buffalo Bills and the Dallas Cowboys.

Troy Aikman NFL Football is an American football game similar to Madden NFL '94 where players can play exhibition matches, season matches, playoff matches, make their own plays for use on the field, and even make payments to the salaries of every player. Most of the rules from the sport are present in the title, though they can be disabled from the menu options. Players can either play directly with the teammates on the playfield or coach an exhibition game or an entire regular season, including the Super Bowl. When playing a season, the progress can be saved via battery-backed memory (or the cartridge's internal EEPROM in the Jaguar version), which prevents the frustration of having to play 16-19 games in a single sitting. During gameplay, there is limited speech from the referee and announcer.

== Development and release ==
Troy Aikman NFL Football was developed by Leland Interactive Media and published by Tradewest, who signed former NFL player Troy Aikman to endorse their then-upcoming American football project. Aikman was also heavily involved in its production by creating the plays as well as being designed alongside the Super Bowl MVP.

Troy Aikman NFL Football was initially released in North America for the Super NES in August 1994 and was later released in Europe by Sony Electronic Publishing during the same year. The Sega Genesis version, also developed by Leland Interactive Media was released shortly after the SNES version only in North America on October. Versions for both Macintosh and PC were also in development and advertised to be released during the same period as with other version, but neither port were published for unknown reasons. The Atari Jaguar version, developed at Telegames' CDG division, was released first released in North America on February 1, 1995, then in Europe on May of the same year and later in Japan by Messe Sansao in July. This last version of the game features digitized graphics and sprites, instead of the original hand-drawn look in the 16-bit versions.

== Reception ==
Reception
Aggregate scores
Aggregator	Scores		
Aggregator	SNES	Genesis	Jaguar
GameRankings	61.50%	—N/a	65%
Review scores
Publication	Scores		
Publication	SNES	Genesis	Jaguar
AllGame	2/5	2/5	2/5
AGH	—N/a	—N/a	5 / 10
EGM	80% 84%	65% 68%	13 / 20
GamePro	14 / 20	12.5 / 20	11 / 20
Game Players	—N/a	77%	—N/a
MAN!AC	40%	—N/a	—N/a
Mega Fun	79%	—N/a	—N/a
Next Generation	—N/a	—N/a	2/5
Nintendo Power	12.3 / 20	—N/a	—N/a
Play Time	83%	—N/a	—N/a
Player One	60%	—N/a	—N/a
ST-Computer	—N/a	—N/a	71%
Super Game Power	—N/a	—N/a	2.8 / 5.0
Total!	4	—N/a	—N/a
Video Games	51%	—N/a	77%
VideoGames	7 / 10	7 / 10	7 / 10

The two sports reviewers of Electronic Gaming Monthly gave the Super NES version scores of 65% and 68%, criticizing the small characters, choppy graphics, and poor defensive AI.

Reviewing the Super NES version, Quick-Draw McGraw of GamePro commented that "What the Genesis did for Joe Montana, the SNES does for Troy Aikman." He noted the large number of options and special features, the inclusion of all the real-world NFL teams, the money management features, and the ability to create your own plays as the game's strong points, though he criticized the graphics and audio as mediocre.

GamePro's Slo Mo accorded the same praises to the Jaguar version but was more vehement in his criticism of the graphics, remarking that it is impossible to identify individual players in large mobs. He concluded, "Despite some tantalizing innovations, Troy Aikman Football sits in favor of better-crafted 16-bit games, including Troy's own clones."

Electronic Gaming Monthly's sports reviewers gave it scores of 6 and 7 out of 10, saying that though they were impressed with the Jaguar version's improvements, particularly the graphics and the new Play Selection Accelerator feature, the game is still so-so. Like Slo Mo, they found that it is difficult to keep track of individual players, and that the control "still isn't what it should be for a big-time football game."

A reviewer for Next Generation, while praising the game's comprehensive content, NFL licensing, and realistic gameplay application of the nuances of football, said that the mediocre graphics and animation, though better on the Jaguar than in previous versions of the game, make it fall short of other football video games on the market. Assessing it to be more a game for hardcore NFL fans than for video gamers, he gave it two out of five stars.
