= Super Play Action Football =

1992 video game

- Cover art
- Developer: TOSE
- Publisher: Nintendo of America
- Programmer: Sadahiro Yoshifuji
- Composer: Studio 401
- Platform: Super NES
- Release: NA: August 1992
- Genre: American football sports game
- Modes: Single-player; Multiplayer

Super Play Action Football is an American football video game developed by Nintendo for the Super NES. It is the follow-up to NES Play Action Football.

== Gameplay ==
In-game newspaper headlines show game results.

The goal of the game is to obtain the ball and reach the other end of the field to score a touchdown, while avoiding opponent players who can pile onto the character possessing the ball.

If the opponent players do manage to pile onto the character holding the ball, the play stops and the team goes back to the previous line. A quirk in the gameplay allows the defensive player to get an easy sack if they dive with the nose tackle at the precise moment the ball is snapped.

Players can choose to play with NFL, college, or high school teams and play a full season with that category.

== Reception ==
Before Super Play Action Football was released, writing for Popular Mechanics, James K. Willcox wrote that the game "should attract sports fans". The game received negative reviews from Total!! UK Magazine (with a 53% overall rating) and the Video Game Critic (with an F rating).
