= Tecmo Bowl: Kickoff =

2008 video game

- Developer: Polygon Magic
- Publisher: Tecmo
- Series: Tecmo Bowl
- Platform: Nintendo DS
- Release: NA: November 18, 2008
- Genre: Sports (American football)
- Modes: Single-player, multiplayer

Tecmo Bowl: Kickoff is an American football video game developed by Polygon Magic and published by Tecmo for the Nintendo DS. A remake of Tecmo Super Bowl, the game was released on November 18, 2008. A Wii version was also announced, but was quietly cancelled and retooled into a new game called Family Fun Football.

== Teams ==
Due to Electronic Arts acquiring the exclusive NFL/NFLPA license for their Madden NFL game series in 2004, the game does not have an NFL license, and use generic names and rosters. However, the game features team cities almost identical to the NFL; the only difference is a Los Angeles team instead of the New York Giants. Team names, uniforms, and players can be edited to the player's liking.

== Features ==
The game features the following improvements and changes to the original game:

- Customizable teams: players are now able to choose team colors, emblems, player names, team cities and abilities
- Super abilities: players can use power-ups during the game
- Customizable playbook: players are able to choose the plays for each team's playbook
- Cutscenes: certain plays cause cinematic representations of the play

The game features Wi-Fi and wireless multiplayer, and utilizes the touch screen and stylus. The game also has updated music and sound effects.

== Reception ==
The game received a 7.7 rating from IGN. The game received a 66 on Metacritic. It was also a nominee for Best Online Multiplayer Game at IGN's 2008 video game awards.

== See also ==
- Tecmo Bowl Throwback
