= Tecmo Super Bowl II: Special Edition =

1994 video game

Tecmo Super Bowl II
- North American SNES box art
- Developer: Tecmo
- Publisher: Tecmo
- Composers: T. Kanai; S. Okuda; H. Suzuki
- Series: Tecmo Super Bowl
- Platforms: Super NES, Genesis
- Release: JP: December 20, 1994; NA: January 1995
- Genre: Sports (American football)
- Modes: Single-player, multiplayer

Tecmo Super Bowl II (テクモスーパーボウルII スペシャルエディション) is an update of the previous Tecmo Super Bowl released for Super NES and Genesis.

== Features ==
Tecmo Super Bowl II was released for the Super NES and Genesis in 1994. The game still had all the features from the previous games and more and once again had a full license from the NFL and the NFL Players Association. All rosters and attributes reflected the 1994 NFL season.

The game added many new features, with trade player being one of them. A pre-season three-week period allows up to three trades to be made. If the offered team accepts the trade, a message along with other trades from other teams will be posted. Any trades not listed means the trade was rejected and the trade period moves on to the next week. All rosters had been increased to 37 players for each team. Unlike the previous versions, defensive players can now be injured or adjusted around in the depth chart. Although new features included the fair catch and choosing a particular defensive play formation, penalties continued to not be one of them. Along with an isometric look to the field, a new style of game graphics were also created to allow random player animations such as dragging defensive players and random spin moves and jumps to avoid diving tacklers. User controlled ballcarriers can now dive at any time and anywhere on the field. The fair catch and two-point conversion (which was first introduced to the NFL in the season the game was released) options were added. Timeouts can now be called right after the whistle blows instead of waiting for the playbook screen to display. Punt and field goal fakes are now possible as well. The offensive playbook was expanded to 16 plays, and the defense was now allowed to choose either a normal, goal line, nickel or dime formation before guessing his opponent's offensive play. In addition to the increased playbook choices, audibles can now be called while on the field to change previous selected plays. The defense can also audible into different defensive formations that are listed above.

The game was packaged with the 1992, 1993, and 1994 schedules, as well as the three team rosters corresponding to those years. Alternate and unofficial schedules can be generated by the CPU, but only in Trade Season Mode. Game quarter lengths (in preseason and probowl only) can be either shortened or extended. Fumbles and injuries can also be turned off, but neither the previous and later options are available in regular season mode. To keep with the traditional "arcade style" feel of the previous games, the game clock remained the same (accelerated), and both penalties and the 40 second play clock were excluded.

== Reception ==
The game saw a relatively limited release, with only 15,000 units of the Super NES version being shipped to US retailers in January 1995. In November 1995, the SNES version sold an estimated 30,634 units in the US, where it was the ninth best-selling SNES game of the month.

In their review of the Super NES version, GamePro commented that "Year after year, Tecmo's football games remain popular with players, even though other carts boast better graphics and game play. Super Bowl II continues that trend: It's a decent game that'll still rank high in the sales." They cited the stats as the game's best feature, but criticized that the graphical style is outdated and there aren't as many plays as in other football video games. They nonetheless concluded that the game is "undeniably fun, especially for first-time players."
