= Emmitt Smith Football =

1995 video game

- Developer: NCM Entertainment
- Publisher: JVC Musical Industries
- Designers: Nimai C. Malle; Scott Hartin
- Artist: Rick Helmick
- Composer: Dan Canary
- Platform: Super NES
- Release: NA: November 1995
- Genre: Sports (American football)
- Modes: Single-player, multiplayer

Emmitt Smith Football is an American football video game released exclusively for the Super NES in North America. Its namesake is former all-pro running back Emmitt Smith of the 1994 Dallas Cowboys. There is no official use of any licenses other than the Emmitt Smith name, making the teams and players fictional.

The game received mediocre reviews from critics, most of whom remarked that the innovative play editor feature is the one thing that keeps the game from being terrible.

== Gameplay ==
Sample gameplay of Emmitt Smith Football.

Like Troy Aikman NFL Football, the player can make up to 64 of their own plays (saved through a battery backup).

Possible modes of play include: exhibition mode and season mode based on the 1994 NFL season. Smith added his voice on the game; giving positive comments on big gains and negative comments on negative plays. Most of the standard rules of the National Football League at the time of release are used (four quarters of 15 minutes, 100 yard field, etc.). However, the options allow the player to change some of the rules used in the actual game. This game was mentioned in the November 1995 issue of Nintendo Power.

== Ratings ==
Emmitt Smith Football received generally mediocre reviews. Slo Mo of GamePro described the game as overall "respectable", but overshadowed by number of superior football games on store shelves. He particularly noted the lack of an NFL license, the "fair" sprites with choppy animation, the playbook interface lifted from Madden NFL, and the play editor feature, which he said is the game's one highlight. The two sports reviewers for Electronic Gaming Monthly agreed that the play editor feature is "the only thing that saves this game from sitting on the bench", criticizing that the choppy animation makes it hard to follow the gameplay and that the game simply isn't fun. They gave it scores of 5.5 and 6.0 out of 10. A reviewer for Next Generation likewise remarked, "That [play editor] feature alone is great, unfortunately it's the only thing that keeps Emmitt Smith Football from being one of the worst football games on the market. Once on the field, the poor graphics and even worse gameplay make the testing of your plays anything but fun." VideoGames & Computer Entertainment recorded a 4 out of 10 in its October 1995 issue.
