= Tecmo Bowl Throwback =

2010 video game

- Developer(s): Southend Interactive, Koei Tecmo
- Publisher(s): Koei Tecmo
- Series: Tecmo Bowl
- Platform(s): Xbox 360 (XBLA), PlayStation 3 (PSN), iOS
- Release: XBLA; April 28, 2010; PSN; June 1, 2010 iOS; May 26, 2011
- Genre(s): Sports
- Mode(s): Single-player, Multiplayer

Tecmo Bowl Throwback is a video game released by Koei Tecmo for the Xbox 360 via Xbox Live Arcade. The PlayStation 3 version was released via the PlayStation Network store on June 1, 2010, followed by the iOS version on May 26, 2011. The game is an update of the 1993 version of Tecmo Super Bowl on the SNES. Due to Electronic Arts obtaining the exclusive NFL and NFLPA licenses in 2004 for the Madden NFL series, the game used generic team and player names.

== Gameplay ==
The gameplay retains the classic feel of the series, which the ESRB described as a "top-down arcade-style football game in which players compete against teams around the world to become the 'International Tecmo Bowl Champion'", with "animated cutscenes".

=== Key features ===
- Updated 3D graphics and user interface improvements
- Player and team name editor
- Online play
- Season play (three total seasons)
- The ability to switch between 3D and 2D graphics by pressing the R button.

== Reception ==
Reception

Aggregate score
Aggregator	Score		
Aggregator	iOS	PS3	Xbox 360
Metacritic	55/100	66/100	67/100

Review scores
Publication	Score		
Publication	iOS	PS3	Xbox 360
1Up.com	N/A	N/A	A−
Game Informer	N/A	N/A	7.25/10
GameRevolution	N/A	N/A	C−
GameSpot	N/A	N/A	7/10
GameTrailers	N/A	N/A	5.7/10
GameZone	N/A	6/10	6/10
IGN	5/10	6.5/10	6.5/10
Official Xbox Magazine (US)	N/A	N/A	4/10
TouchArcade	3/5 stars	N/A	N/A
411Mania	N/A	N/A	8/10

The game received "mixed or average reviews" on all platforms according to the review aggregation website Metacritic.
