= Football (video game) =

1978 video game

- North American arcade flyer
- Developer: Atari, Inc.
- Publishers: NA: Atari, Inc.; JP: Namco
- Designer: Steve Bristow
- Programmer: Michael Albaugh
- Platforms: Arcade, Atari 2600
- Release: Arcade: NA: October 1978; JP: September 1979; 2600: March 1979
- Genre: Sports (American football)
- Modes: Single-player, multiplayer

Football (also known as Atari Football) is a 1978 American football video game developed and released by Atari, Inc. for arcades. Players are represented by X's and O's. While predated by Sega's World Cup, Football is credited with popularizing the trackball controller and is also the first non-racing vertically scrolling video game. It was distributed in Japan by Namco in 1979.

Football was the second highest-earning arcade video game of 1979 in the United States. That year Atari released a more challenging four-player version of the arcade game programmed by Dave Theurer, who later created Missile Command and Tempest.

== Development ==
The game was designed by Steve Bristow and programmed by Michael Albaugh, with the hardware engineered by Dave Stubben. The game's use of a trackball was inspired by an earlier Japanese association football (soccer) game that had used trackball controls. When the team saw the game, they brought a cabinet to their lab and imitated the trackball controls.

An earlier association football game that used trackball controls was Sega's World Cup, released seven months earlier in March 1978, but in 2001 Steven L. Kent reported that Stubben attributed the earlier trackball soccer game to Taito. In a later 2017 interview, Albaugh said he was uncertain which company it was from, but remembers it was from a Japanese company.

Atari's Football was released in October 1978.

== Reception ==
Football was the second highest-earning video game in 1979 in the United States, below only Space Invaders (1978).

== Legacy ==
Although not the first trackball game, predated by Sega's World Cup in March 1978, Atari Football is credited with popularizing the trackball.

== See also ==
- Gridiron Fight - 1985 American football game from Tehkan (Tecmo)
- Cyberball - 1988 American football game from Atari
