= Mac Pro Football =

1986 video game

- Publisher: The Avalon Hill Game Company
- Platform: MacOS
- Release: 1986
- Genre: Sports

Mac Pro Football is a 1986 video game published by The Avalon Hill Game Company.

== Gameplay ==
Mac Pro Football is a game in which three levels of coaching skill are available, and the computer opponent remembers previous plays and can change the game plan in the second half of the game.

== Reception ==
Wyatt Lee reviewed the game for Computer Gaming World, and stated that "Minus yardage must be tabulated for the only thing missing, sound effects. The plus yardage described is due to get better as additional Team Data Disks are released."
