= NFL Football (video game) =

1980 video game

- Intellivision cover art
- Developer: Mattel Electronics
- Publisher: Mattel Electronics
- Designers: Ken Smith; Kevin Miller
- Platforms: Intellivision, Atari 2600
- Release: Intellivision: October 3, 1980; 2600: July 1982
- Genre: Sports (American football)
- Mode: Multiplayer

NFL Football is an American football video game developed by Mattel and released for its Intellivision system in 1980. The players each control a football team competing in a standard four-quarter game. Like Mattel's other sports video games, NFL Football did not use any official National Football League team names or player names, even though Mattel obtained a license from the NFL and used the league's logo in its box art. NFL Football has been cited as the first football video game to have a playbook.

== Gameplay ==
NFL Football on Intellivision

The player controls a five-man football team, actively controlling one team member at a time, with the computer controlling the rest. As in traditional American football, the player's team must score more points than the opponent's team within the time limit of the game. The game consists of four quarters, each a simulated 15 minutes in length, and takes place on a horizontally scrolling 100-yard simulated football field.

Player 1 always starts the game on offense and receives the opening kick-off from Player 2; at the start of the second half, Player 2 will receive the kick-off from Player 1. NFL Football is played in the same basic manner as a regulation game of football, with the offense being given four downs to advance the ball a minimum of ten yards before losing possession of the football to the opposing team. At the start of each down, the players use their controller's keypad to input a formation and a play for that down; descriptions and diagrams of the plays were printed in the game's instruction manual and not visible on-screen. When both players have entered their formations, play resumes.

The player on offense generally controls the team's quarterback unless the ball is handed off to a running back or passed to an eligible receiver. In the former case, control immediately switches to the running back. In the latter case, control switches to the intended receiver, who must maneuver to catch the ball before it goes out of bounds or is intercepted by the defense. On defense, the player controls the "captain," roughly in the position of a safety. All defensive team members are capable of tackling the ball carrier, but only the player-controlled team member may attempt to intercept a pass.

Games whose scores are tied at the end of the fourth quarter of play end as ties, with no overtime period.

=== Variations from standard football ===
NFL Football made numerous concessions to how a standard game of football is played. Unlike modern football video games, which use statistics to determine a team's relative strengths and weaknesses, the two teams in the game are of equal strength, with the only significant variable being the player's own abilities. There is also no play clock governing the pace of the game; players may take all the time needed to select plays, although in situations where the game clock would be running (such as after a completed play that did not result in a first down), the game clock will continue to run until another game action stops it. Each player does have three time-outs per half, but time-outs will last until the player who called the time-out completes play selection. Players, in the truest sense, are not able to audible, although they may call a time-out at the line of scrimmage and make a change if the ball has not been snapped.

Touchdowns are worth seven points, with the extra point considered automatic, and no option to attempt a two-point conversion; at the time the game was released, the lack of a two-point conversion was not considered a concession, as the NFL didn't incorporate the rule until 1994. Field goals are possible, but with no goal posts at the end zones, the kicked ball must simply cross the back of the end zone in order to be considered good. Safeties are possible and are handled in the same manner as regulation football, with the defensive team receiving two points and possession of the ball, although in lieu of a kick-off, the team scoring the safety takes possession on its own 20-yard line.

== Ports ==
NFL Football was sold by Sears for the Super Video Arcade under the title Football, its private-label version of the Intellivision console, without the NFL name or logo.

M Network, Mattel's third-party brand, released a port of NFL Football called Super Challenge Football for the Atari 2600 in 1982. Similarly, the game appears in the Intellivision Lives compilation game and on Microsoft's Game Room service as Football.

== Reception ==
Football was reviewed by Video magazine in its "Arcade Alley" column where it was praised for its number and variety of available plays. In allowing the player a great degree of control over the strategic elements of the game, the reviewers asserted, "NFL Football will make video arcade lovers think they've died and gone to Super Bowl heaven." The game was covered again two years later in Video magazine's 1982 Guide to Electronic Games where reviewers expanded on this, suggesting that "the scrolling playfield and great number of offensive and defensive play possibilities are without peer in the video-game field".

== Reviews ==
- Games
