= Time Cruise =

1991 video game

- Developer: Face
- Publishers: JP: Face; NA: Turbo Technologies Inc.
- Composers: Hiroto Saitō; Nozomu Takahashi
- Platform: PC Engine/TurboGrafx-16
- Release: JP: November 8, 1991; NA: December 1992
- Genre: Pinball
- Mode: Single-player

Time Cruise (known as Time Cruise II in Japan) is a science fiction themed pinball video game developed by Face for the PC Engine/TurboGrafx-16 game system, released on November 8, 1991 in Japan and December 1992 in the United States.

== Plot ==
Time Cruise's plot centers around Eric, a young scientific genius. Eric learns the secret of time travel by channeling with an intelligent extraterrestrial lifeform. After 8 years of hard work, Eric completes his time travel system (seven buildings with a time-travel pod moving between them at high speeds) and sets off in his shining silver time travel pod to explore the limits of time and space.

== Gameplay ==
The Time Cruise playfield consists of seven screens and scrolls both horizontally and vertically. The player can nudge the table to influence the ball's path, but doing this too many times can cause a tilt condition, resulting in a lost ball. Scattered around the playfield are five different time travel switches. Hitting a switch with the ball activates its corresponding time travel mechanism, and landing the ball in an activated mechanism causes a time warp to take place. These alternate times range from a prehistoric sea floor in 460,000,000 B.C. to an orbiting Mars colony in 2054, and take the form of bonus stages where the player can earn points and extra balls. Occasionally, due to flaws in the time travel system the player will be brought to an alternate dimension (a sixth bonus stage) rather than the time period they intended to warp to. The game ends either when the player loses all of their balls, or when they attain a score of 99,999,999 which causes an ending cut-scene and the game's credits to be displayed.

== Reception ==
Reception

Review scores
Publication	Score
Consoles +	91%
Electronic Gaming Monthly	5/10, 6/10, 6/10, 5/10
Famitsu	6/10, 5/10, 7/10, 6/10
Game Informer	5.5/10
Games-X	4/5
Gekkan PC Engine	85/100, 80/100, 70/100, 70/100, 70/100
Génération 4	81%
Joypad	72%
Joystick	69%
Marukatsu PC Engine	7/10, 7/10, 8/10, 7/10
Player One	87%
VideoGames & Computer Entertainment	5/10
Digital Press	9/10
Electric Brain	76%, 85%
Go! Hand-Held Video Games	92/100

Time Cruise garnered generally favorable reviews from critics. GamePro's Otter Matic magazine praised the game's visuals and controls, but heavily criticized the audio and soundtrack as the weakest aspect of the game.
