= Tecmo Super Bowl =

1991 video game

- North American NES box art
- Developer: Tecmo
- Publisher: Tecmo
- Director: Shin-ichiro Tomie
- Programmers: Akihiko Shimoji; Tomonobu Itagaki
- Artists: Kazushige Tomita; Yoshitaka Mizushima
- Composers: Keiji Yamagishi; Ryuichi Nitta
- Series: Tecmo Bowl
- Platforms: NES, Super NES, Sega Genesis, PlayStation
- Release: December 13, 1991: NES; JP: December 13, 1991; NA: December 1991 Super NES; JP: November 26, 1993; NA: November 1993 Genesis; JP: November 26, 1993; NA: November 1993 PlayStation; NA: 1996
- Genres: Sports (American football)
- Modes: Single-player, multiplayer

Tecmo Super Bowl (Note: Known in Japan as テクモスーパーボウル Tekumo Sūpā Bōru) is a 1991 American football video game developed and published by Tecmo for the Nintendo Entertainment System (NES). It is the sequel to 1987's Tecmo Bowl, as well as the first video game to be licensed by both the National Football League and the National Football League Players Association, thus allowing the game to use the names and attributes of real NFL teams and players. Prior games used either the real teams, the real players, or fictional substitutes, but not real teams and players together.

The game was a major success, resulting in several follow-ups for subsequent game consoles. The NES original has had an extensive cult following across the decades, with widely covered tournaments as the game modification community provides annual roster updates. It has been variously named as one of the best NES games, one of the best sports games, and one of the most influential video games of all time.

== Overview ==
With Tecmo Bowl for NES in 1989, Tecmo had procured an official license from the National Football League Players Association, providing twelve teams and a truncated roster. The full NFL team license was unavailable because of the exclusive license held for another NES game, NFL published by LJN. The success of Tecmo Bowl was followed by the release of Tecmo Super Bowl in 1991 in North America and Japan, for which Tecmo acquired both sets of the NFL/NFLPA licenses, making it the first and only NES game to feature both real NFL teams and players. Although the game was released in late 1991, all team rosters and player attributes are from the prior 1990–91 NFL season, so it contains no rookies taken in the 1991 NFL draft and no player team changes executed before the start of the 1991 season.

Tecmo Super Bowl surpasses its predecessor with the complete 1991 league of 28 teams, expanded rosters, expanded playbooks, and statistical tracking including NFL records. Jim Kelly, Randall Cunningham, and Bernie Kosar are represented by generic names of QB Bills, QB Eagles, and QB Browns, respectively, because the players were not members of the NFLPA's marketing contract. This gameplay foundation would be expanded upon during the course of the series' run.

== Gameplay ==
Bo Jackson is carrying the ball.

== Reception ==
Reception

Review score
Publication	Score
AllGame	4/5 (SNES); 4/5 (GEN); 2.5/5 (PS1)

In the United States, Tecmo Super Bowl topped Babbage's NES sales charts for three months in 1992, from October to December. At a retail price of $54.99 (equivalent to $126 in 2025), it was the most expensive NES game released to date.

In 1997, Electronic Gaming Monthly and IGN each named Tecmo Super Bowl as one of the top 100 video games of all time. IGN ranked Tecmo Super Bowl number 53 in its top 100 NES games. GamesRadar ranked it number 22 in its list of the best NES games, noting that it may be the only football game from the NES still widely played. PC Magazine ranked the game number 10 in its list of the ten most-influential video games of all time. ESPN named Tecmo Super Bowl the greatest sports video game of all time.

== Legacy ==
=== Sequels and related games ===
Tecmo produced several direct sequels to Tecmo Super Bowl, and other games originating with the Tecmo Bowl engine. 16-bit versions of Tecmo Super Bowl for the Super NES and Genesis were released in 1993 (reflecting the rosters and attributes for that season), which fixed many bugs and added some new features. New features include these: improved game graphics and sound; official NFL team logos in the end zones; user-controlled touchbacks; the ability to control a player to attempt a punt block; the in-game option to change plays in a team's playbook during games; a running back "dive play" option; a designated return team that includes defensive backs; statistical achievements during games; and three weather conditions (sunny, rain and snow), which can occur randomly in Season mode. Accelerated fifteen-minute and ten-minute quarters can only be used for Exhibition and Pro Bowl games. The game can play three consecutive seasons (1991–1993). Sequels to these versions, Tecmo Super Bowl II: Special Edition and Tecmo Super Bowl III: Final Edition, were released in subsequent years for the Super NES and Genesis. These were followed by Tecmo Super Bowl for the PlayStation in 1996.

Tecmo Super Bowl for the PlayStation sports new features such as a new player editor which can make unlimited amounts of unrestricted trades, change jersey numbers, edit player attributes, edit names, and swap player portraits. It has a play-by-play announcer voice. Offenses can pick a formation before selecting a particular play. The game has alternate camera angles, instant replay, and the option to adjust AI difficulty in regular season games. This is the last entry in the series to have the NFL and NFLPA licenses, and reflected the rosters and attributes of the 1996 season.

A Sega Saturn version was in development, but was never released. Subsequent entries, such as 2008's Tecmo Bowl: Kickoff for the Nintendo DS, and 2010's Tecmo Bowl Throwback for the Xbox 360 and PS3 feature generic players and teams, due to Electronic Arts obtaining the exclusive NFL and NFLPA licenses in 2004 for the Madden NFL series.

=== Cult following ===
Since the advent of modern console emulation on computers, Tecmo Super Bowl is one of the most modified NES games. This contributes greatly to its cult following as it is constantly updated with rosters for college and professional football. Numerous websites are dedicated to pickup games, online leagues, and message boards for the original game and its mods. In 2016, popularity spiked with 26 national tournaments, Tecmo Madison XIII's livestream having 161,076 viewers, and ESPN.com providing coverage.

An episode of NFL Films Presents documents the video game and its cult following. Centering on the annual world championship tournament in Madison, Wisconsin, the episode includes interviews with NFL greats such as Emmitt Smith and Christian Okoye who are featured in the original game, and modern NFL players such as Philip Rivers who discuss their passion for the game.

=== In popular culture ===
Bo Jackson's character in Tecmo Super Bowl is infamous for his high speed and agility in comparison to other characters, with players claiming that he could run for as many as 1,000 yards in a single game. TechTimes noted that the game's character of Bo Jackson was "[a]bsolutely, positively—and absurdly—unstoppable", reflecting the real Jackson's extraordinary athletic abilities. Players considered using Jackson as effectively cheating within the game. Lawrence Taylor's character was used similarly on defense. He was called the "greatest video game athlete of all-time" by ESPN and USA Today. In the Family Guy episode “Run, Chris, Run”, Peter Griffin plays the NES version (mistaken for its predecessor) as Bo Jackson, humorously scoring a touchdown despite having intentionally sabotaged his game by going backwards multiple times; Glenn Quagmire complains during the entirety of the game. This serves as a central theme for two 2016 Kia Sorento commercials, starring Bo Jackson and playing off his ridiculously advantageous in-game characteristics. One features Brian Bosworth, who had been famously run over by Jackson during a Monday Night Football game in 1987 as he attempted to score a touchdown.
