= Tecmo Super Bowl III: Final Edition =

1995 video game

- Genesis box art
- Developer: Tecmo
- Publisher: Tecmo
- Series: Tecmo Super Bowl
- Platforms: Super NES, Sega Genesis
- Release: Genesis: NA: October 1995; Super NES: NA: October 1995; JP: December 22, 1995
- Genre: Sports (American football)
- Modes: Single-player, multiplayer

Tecmo Super Bowl III: Final Edition is a 1995 American football video game released on the Super Nintendo Entertainment System and the Sega Genesis. According to a spokesperson for the game's developer/publisher, Tecmo, the subtitle "Final Edition" refers to it being the last football game Tecmo would make for 16-bit systems. The game features the full NFL and NFLPA licenses.

== Gameplay ==
The game is closer to the real-life sport in comparison to the NES and the previous two SNES/Sega Genesis Tecmo Super Bowl games in several ways. Each team has a playbook of eight passing plays and eight running plays, any one of which can be switched out and another put in its place in the middle of a game. It also includes some of the more nuanced strategies of football, such as attempting two-point conversions. Also setting itself apart from the NES-era games was the in-game presentation, which is more akin to the realistic "TV style" presentation of modern football games like the Madden series. After a big offensive play, or a turnover or sack on defense, a box would appear on screen with a small grayscale picture of the player involved alongside his current statistics for the game.

The series' shift towards greater realism is also reflected in the game's season mode. First, it records fairly detailed statistics of each game and cumulative statistics for each team in the league throughout the season. Also throughout the season the game would maintain a list of leaders across the league in each major statistical category, and would record when a player or team broke an NFL record. The rosters for each team can also be customized by the user, and the starting lineup of a user-controlled team can be changed at any point in Season mode. Tecmo Super Bowl III's season mode also features occasional injuries, which would last for varied amounts of time just as in real life.

== Features ==
Although Tecmo Super Bowl II: Special Edition added many new features during its limited release, Tecmo Super Bowl III added even more to make the "Final Edition" the last installment of the series. The new Super Star Editor allows for creating players while using a limited point system. These created players can be improved upon, but only if they do well in Season Mode. As in the last edition, player trades can be made during a three-week period right before Season Mode begins. Free agency is another addition to the game, which allows signing players not currently on teams, but not before space on rosters is made available. The free agent pool is only available when Trade Mode Season is selected. Depending on the home team, different stadium types are sometimes used, such as real grass fields, indoor/outdoor astro turf, or even a converted baseball infield style of stadium.

Alternate schedules are generated by the computer after the official (1995) schedule is played through. The fake extra point option, which was excluded from the previous version, was added to the game. Also new to the game is that player stats and real life player portraits are occasionally posted during games, so whenever a player makes a big catch, or a running back runs for so many yards, a window comes up indicating how that player is doing. As the game reflects the rosters and attributes of the 1995 season, this Tecmo Super Bowl game includes the two new expansion teams for 1995, the Jacksonville Jaguars and Carolina Panthers.

== Reception ==
Reviewing the Super NES version, Slo Mo of GamePro remarked positively on the two-player mode, the graphics, the Superstar Editor, and the inclusion of real pro teams, colors, logos, and players. He criticized the limited field view which leads to deep receivers running off screen, but concluded the game to be "easy to play and a gas for two antagonists." A reviewer for Next Generation panned the game, citing outdated graphics and perspective, a mediocre soundtrack, and a small and "ill-conceived" playbook. He gave it one out of five stars.

Reviewing the Genesis version, GamePro's Wiley Weasel said the game has passable graphics and sound effects, but falters in the control department. He particularly criticized the inability to switch to the player closest to the ball after a snap, the lack of spin or stiff-arm moves, the need to cycle through receivers on passing plays, and that the player's team falls completely under A.I. control when a pass is in the air. He concluded that the game falls short of competitors like Madden NFL '96 but is worth consideration due to its accessibility.
