= MicroLeague Football: The Coach's Challenge =

1990 video game

- Developer(s): MicroLeague Sports Association
- Publisher(s): MicroLeague Sports Association
- Platform(s): DOS
- Release: 1990
- Genre(s): Sports management

MicroLeague Football: The Coach's Challenge is a 1990 video game published by MicroLeague Sports Association.

== Gameplay ==
MicroLeague Football: The Coach's Challenge is a game in which football strategy is simulated.

== Reception ==
Win Rogers reviewed the game for Computer Gaming World, and stated that "Despite the relatively high sticker prices, these are actually economy cars offering dependable family transportation. They are for the serious no-nonsense sports fan — not for the thrill-seeker in the market for a sexy sports model."

Peter Scisco for Compute! praised the game's simplicity and described it as "Straightforward, basic, well-designed, and fun".

Game Player's PC Strategy Guide declared that the best part of the game is "its ability to let you play out gridiron fantasies and might-have-been super matches."

In rating the best games of 1991, VideoGames & Computer Entertainment gave the game an Honorable Mention and called it "the state-of-the-art pigskin simulation" for players who are looking for "full-screen animated graphics as well as accurate mathematical modeling of simulated players".

== Reviews ==
- Game Player's PC Strategy Guide
