= Tecmo Bowl =

1987 video game

- European arcade flyer
- Developer: Tecmo (Note: Game Boy version developed by Sculptured Software.)
- Publisher: Tecmo
- Composer: Keiji Yamagishi
- Series: Tecmo Bowl
- Platforms: Arcade, Nintendo Entertainment System, Game Boy
- Release: Arcade: JP/NA: December 1987; EU: 1987; NES: NA: February 1989; JP: November 30, 1990; Game Boy: JP: September 27, 1991; NA: September 1991
- Genre: Sports
- Modes: Single-player, multiplayer
- Arcade system: PlayChoice-10

Tecmo Bowl (Note: Japanese: テクモボウル, Hepburn: Tekumo Bōru) is a 1987 American football video game developed and published by Tecmo for arcades. The game features a large dual screen cabinet with up to four players between two fictitious teams. A port for the Nintendo Entertainment System (NES) was released in 1989 and was the first console game to include real National Football League players, via a license from the NFL Players Association. A Game Boy version developed by Sculptured Software followed in 1991.

The NES version was extremely popular, spawning various sequels, starting with 1991's Tecmo Super Bowl. The NES original has been cited as one of the best sports video games ever made. The NES and arcade versions have been re-released (without the NFLPA license) for various platforms.

== Gameplay ==
The original arcade version is distinguished by a large two-monitor cabinet, support for up to four players, and the ability to break tackles. Only two fictional teams can be chosen: the Wildcats and the Bulldogs. Its 2D graphics are more advanced than the NES version, with a larger color palette and more detailed sprites.

The NES version allows two players to play rather than the arcade's four players. The player can choose between three modes: one-player, two-player, and coach. In one-player mode, the player picks a football team and plays against the computer. After every game that the player wins, it is given a password to continue their quest for the championship and the computer picks another team to play as, and the player stays with the original choice. In the two-player and coach modes, the player and another human will play one game but the players only choose the plays in the coach mode (which cannot be done in the arcade version).

In both versions, the playbook consists of only four offensive plays. When on defense, a player selects a play based on the anticipation of the offense's choice; if chosen correctly, it results in a collapse of the offensive line and well-covered receivers, therefore setting up either a potential sack or an interception.

Although featuring the names, rosters, and statistics of real National Football League (NFL) players from a mix of the 1987 and 1988 seasons, the gameplay limits how closely the video game players mimics real-life players. Unlike standard American football rules which have 11 players on each team, the arcade version only allows ten players on the field at a time and the NES version only allows nine for each. The offense tries to avoid the defense, and the defense tries to either avoid blockers, tackle the ball carrier, or intercept a pass.

=== Teams ===
Tecmo Bowl contains twelve teams, each equipped with four plays. Most teams have two running plays and two passing plays. The exceptions are San Francisco and Miami, who have three passing plays and one running play.

Tecmo was not able an obtain an NFL league license to use real team names, as that had been given to LJN's NFL video game for the NES. As a result, the teams in the game are identified solely by their home city or state, but through the NFLPA license, each roster mimics that of the NFL team based out of the same city or state. Tecmo Bowl only uses players from twelve of the best and most popular teams of the time.

The teams featured in the game are Indianapolis, Miami, Cleveland, Denver, Seattle, Los Angeles (Raiders), Washington, San Francisco, Dallas, New York (Giants), Chicago, and Minnesota.

AFC	NFC
Los Angeles (Raiders)	Washington
Indianapolis	San Francisco
Miami	Dallas
Denver	New York (Giants)
Seattle	Chicago
Cleveland	Minnesota

Each team has a different level of effectiveness based on its personnel and play selection.

Box art of North American NES version

Two NES versions were released in the U.S. The first is identified by its black and gold seal of quality, Eric Dickerson as running back, and Albert Bentley as a kick returner for Indianapolis. The second is identified by its white and gold seal, Albert Bentley as running back, and Clarence Verdin as a kick returner. One year later, the Famicom version has many roster changes (from the same twelve teams available in the North American version) to reflect being released during the real 1990 NFL season.

== Re-releases ==
In 2005, the game was released on the Xbox as part of Tecmo Classic Arcade. The NES version was released for the Virtual Console for the Wii, Nintendo 3DS and Wii U; the arcade version was also released for the Wii's Virtual Console. The NES version was also released as one of 30 NES games included in the North American and PAL versions of the NES Classic Edition. It was released on the Nintendo Classics service in 2018, allowing multiplayer to be played online. Hamster Corporation released the game as part of their Arcade Archives series for the Nintendo Switch and PlayStation 4 in 2020.

== Reception and legacy ==
According to Tecmo USA's Dimitri Criona, the game was a smash hit in American arcades and an even bigger hit for the Nintendo Entertainment System, becoming a cultural phenomenon in the United States. As of June 2007, the Tecmo Bowl series had sold 5 million units worldwide.

Sinclair User reviewed the arcade game in 1988, scoring it 8 out of 10. They called it a "superb" game that significantly improved on earlier American football games such as 10-Yard Fight (1983). Computer Entertainer reviewed the NES version in 1989, scoring it 7 out of 8 stars.

In the September 1997 issue of Nintendo Power, twelve staff members voted in a list for the top 100 games of all time, putting Tecmo Bowl at 30th place. Both GameSpot and Time have also listed Tecmo Bowl for the NES in their lists of all-time greatest video games. Time noted that the arcade-like controls and "quasi-realistic teams and players" made it a "breakout hit that's still fun to pick up and play to this very day". Game Informer placed the game 38th on its top 100 video games of all time in 2001.

=== Tecmo Bowl documentary ===
A documentary feature about the best Tecmo Bowl players in the world was shot in 2022 by CJ Wallis. The film takes place in Omaha, Nebraska where the National Championship takes place every year and features Super Bowl-winning quarterback Jim McMahon and SEC host Cole Cubelic.

== See also ==
- Gridiron Fight (1985 arcade game) – American football game by Tehkan (before it was known as Tecmo), a precursor to Tecmo Bowl.
- NFL (video game) – contemporary NES game developed by Atlus, featuring real NFL teams but no real NFL players.
- Retro Bowl (2020 video game) – American football game developed by New Star Games, featuring gameplay and graphics directly inspired by Tecmo Bowl.
