= Sports video game =

Sports-simulating video game

A sports video game is a video game that simulates the practice of sports. Most sports have been recreated with video games, including team sports, track and field, extreme sports, and combat sports. Some games emphasize playing the sport (such as EA Sports FC, eFootball, EA Sports F1, EA Sports WRC, NBA 2K and TopSpin 2K25), while others emphasize strategy and sport management (such as Football Manager and Out of the Park Baseball). Some, such as Need for Speed, Arch Rivals and Punch-Out!!, satirize the sport for comic effect. This genre has been popular throughout the history of video games and is competitive, just like real-world sports. A number of game series feature the names and characteristics of real teams and players, and are updated annually to reflect real-world changes. The sports genre is one of the oldest genres in gaming history.

== Game design ==
Sports games involve physical and tactical challenges, and test the player's precision and accuracy. Most sports games attempt to model the athletic characteristics required by that sport, including speed, strength, acceleration, accuracy, and so on. As with their respective sports, these games take place in a stadium or arena with clear boundaries. Sports games often provide play-by-play and color commentary through the use of recorded audio.

Sports games sometimes make use of different modes for different parts of the game. This is especially true in games about American football such as the Madden NFL series, where executing a pass play requires six different gameplay modes in the span of approximately 45 seconds. Sometimes, other sports games offer a menu where players may select a strategy while play is temporarily suspended. Association football video games sometimes shift gameplay modes when it is time for the player to attempt a penalty kick, a free shot at goal from the penalty spot, taken by a single player. Some sports games also require players to shift roles between the athletes and the coach or manager. These mode switches are more intuitive than other game genres because they reflect actual sports.

Older 2D sports games sometimes used an unrealistic graphical scale, where athletes appeared to be quite large in order to be visible to the player. As sports games have evolved, players have come to expect a realistic graphical scale with a high degree of verisimilitude. Sports games often simplify the game physics for ease of play, and ignore factors such as a player's inertia. Games typically take place with a highly accurate time-scale, although they usually allow players to play quick sessions with shorter game quarters or periods.

Sports games sometimes treat button-pushes as continuous signals rather than discrete moves, in order to initiate and end a continuous action. For example, football games may distinguish between short and the long passes based on how long the player holds a button. Golf games often initiate the backswing with one button-push, and the swing itself is initiated by a subsequent push.

== History ==
=== Origins (1958–1972) ===
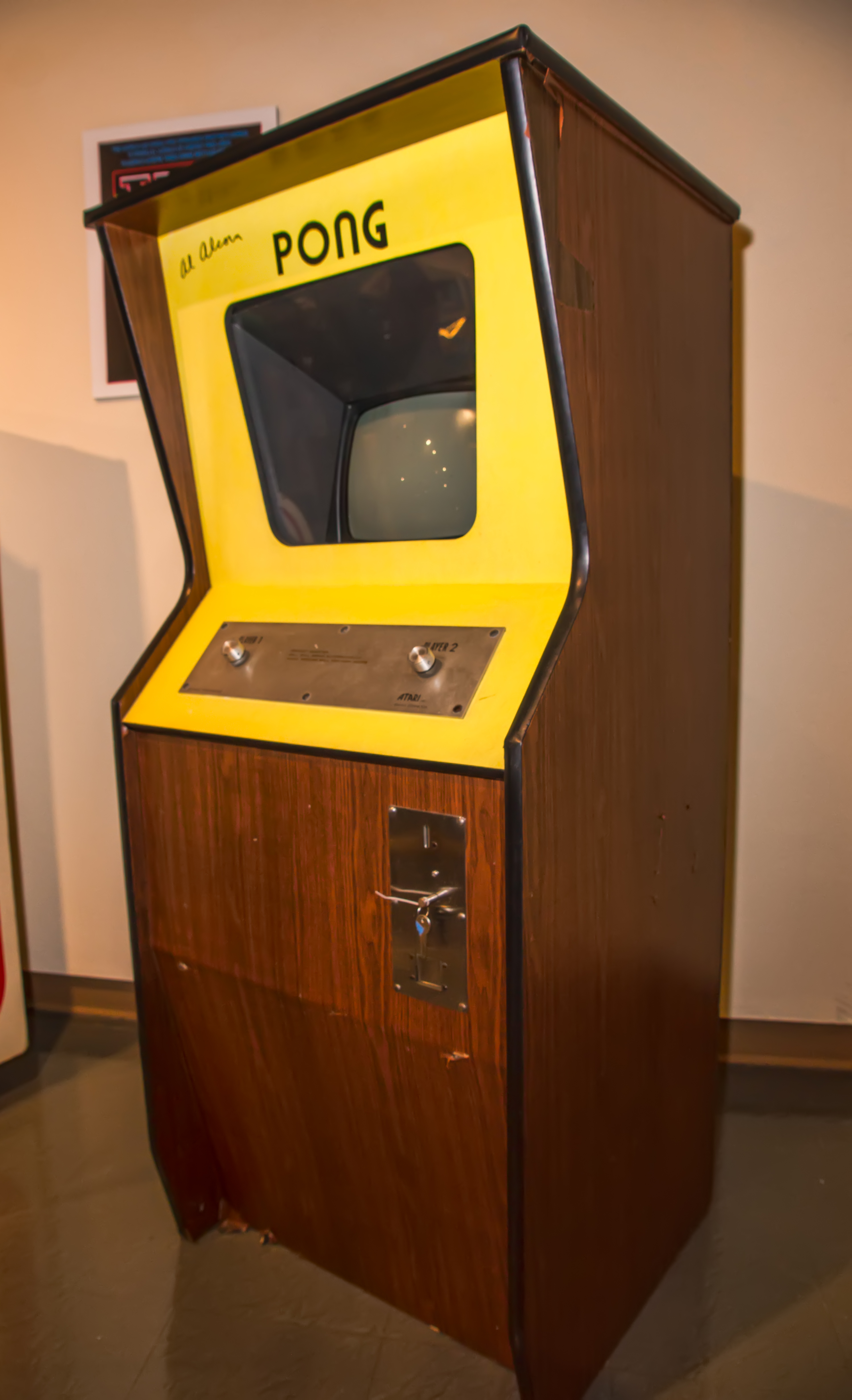
Pong (1972) arcade cabinet

Sports video games have origins in sports electro-mechanical games (EM games), which were arcade games manufactured using a mixture of electrical and mechanical components, for amusement arcades between the 1940s and 1970s. Examples include boxing games such as International Mutoscope Reel Company's K.O. Champ (1955), bowling games such as Bally Manufacturing's Bally Bowler and Chicago Coin's Corvette from 1966, baseball games such as Midway Manufacturing's Little League (1966) and Chicago Coin's All Stars Baseball (1968), other team sport games such as Taito's Crown Soccer Special (1967) and Crown Basketball (1968), and air hockey type games such as Sega's MotoPolo (1968) and Air Hockey (1972) by Brunswick Billiards.

The earliest sports video game dates backs to 1958, when William Higinbotham created a game called Tennis for Two, a competitive two-player tennis game played on an oscilloscope. The players would select the angle at which to put their racket, and pressed a button to return it. Although this game was incredibly simple, it demonstrated how an action game (rather than previous puzzles) could be played on a computer. Video games prior to the late 1970s were primarily played on university mainframe computers under timesharing systems that supported multiple computer terminals on school campuses. The two dominant systems in this era were Digital Equipment Corporation's PDP-10 and Control Data Corporation's PLATO. Both could only display text, and not graphics, originally printed on teleprinters and line printers, but later printed on single-color CRT screens.

Ralph Baer developed Table Tennis for the first video game console, the Magnavox Odyssey, released in 1972. While the console had other sports-themed game cards, they required the use of television overlays while playing similarly to board games or card games. Table Tennis was the only Odyssey game that was entirely electronic and did not require an overlay, introducing a ball-and-paddle game design that showcased the potential of the new video game medium. This provided the basis for the first commercially successful video game, Pong (1972), released as an arcade video game by Atari, Inc.

=== Ball-and-paddle era (1973–1975) ===
Numerous ball-and-paddle games that were either clones or variants of Pong were released for arcades in 1973. Atari themselves released a four-player cooperative multiplayer variant, Pong Doubles (1973), based on tennis doubles. In the United States, the best-selling arcade video game of 1973 was Pong, followed by several of its clones and variants, including Pro Tennis from Williams Electronics, Winner from Midway Manufacturing, Super Soccer and Tennis Tourney from Allied Leisure (later called Centuri), and TV Tennis from Chicago Coin.

In Japan, arcade manufacturers such as Taito initially avoided video games as they found Pong to be simplistic compared to more complex EM games, but after Sega successfully tested-marketed Pong in Japan, Sega and Taito released the clones Pong Tron and Elepong, respectively, in July 1973, before the official Japanese release of Pong by Atari Japan (later part of Namco) in November 1973. Tomohiro Nishikado's four-player Pong variant Soccer was released by Taito in November 1973, with a green background to simulate an association football playfield along with a goal on each side. Another Taito variant, Pro Hockey (1973), set boundaries around the screen and only a small gap for the goal.

Tomohiro Nishikado wanted to move beyond simple rectangles to character graphics, resulting in his development of a basketball game, Taito's TV Basketball, released in April 1974. It was the earliest use of character sprites to represent human characters in a video game. While the gameplay was similar to earlier ball-and-paddle games, it displayed images both for the players and the baskets, and attempted to simulate basketball. Each player controls two team members, a forward and a guard; the ball can be passed between team members before shooting, and the ball has to fall into the opposing team's basket to score a point. The game was released in North America by Midway as TV Basketball, selling 1,400 arcade cabinets in the United States, a production record for Midway up until they released Wheels the following year. Ramtek later released Baseball in October 1974, similarly featuring the use of character graphics.

In 1975, Nintendo released EVR-Race, a horse racing simulation game with support for up to six players. It was a mixture between a video game and an electro-mechanical game, and played back video footage from a video tape.

=== Decline (1976–1982) ===
After the market became flooded with Pong clones, the Pong market crashed around the mid-1970s. Sports video games would not regain the same level of success until the 1980s.

In 1976, Sega released an early combat sport game, Heavyweight Champ, based on boxing and now considered the first fighting game.

In March 1978, Sega released World Cup, an association football game with a trackball controller. In October 1978, Atari released Atari Football, which is considered to be the first video game to accurately emulate American football; it also popularized the use of a trackball, with the game's developers mentioning it was inspired by an earlier Japanese association football game that used a trackball. Atari Football was the second highest-earning arcade video game of 1979 in the United States, below only Taito's shoot 'em up blockbuster Space Invaders (1978), though Atari Football was the only sports game among the top ten highest-earners.

In 1980, Mattel's Basketball for the Intellivision was the first basketball video game to be licensed by the National Basketball Association (NBA). On home computers, Microsoft's Olympic Decathlon (1980) was one of the first sports-related programs to mix game and simulation elements, and was an early example of an Olympic track-and-field game. The first sports simulation game was most likely either Computer Baseball or Computer Quarterback, both released in 1981. The first association football management simulation, Football Manager, was released for the ZX Spectrum computer in 1982.

Between 1981 and 1983, the Atari's VCS (2600) and Mattel's Intellivision waged a series of high-stakes TV advertising campaigns promoting their respective systems, marking the start of the first console wars. Atari prevailed in arcade games and had a larger customer base due to its lower price, while Intellivision touted its visually superior sports games. Sports writer George Plimpton was featured in the Intellivision ads, which showed the parallel games side by side. Both Atari and Intellivision fielded at least one game for baseball, American football, hockey, basketball and association football. Atari's sports games included Activision Tennis (1981).

=== Resurgence (1983–1985) ===
Sports video games experienced a resurgence from 1983. As the golden age of arcade video games came to an end, arcade manufacturers began looking for ways to reinvigorate the arcade video game industry, so they began turning to sports games. The arcade industry began producing sports games at levels not seen since the days of Pong and its clones, which played a role in the recovery of the arcade market by the mid-1980s. There were initially high expectations for laserdisc games to help revive the arcade industry in 1983, but it was instead non-laserdisc sports games that ended up being the most well-received hits at amusement arcade shows by late 1983.

==== Arcades ====
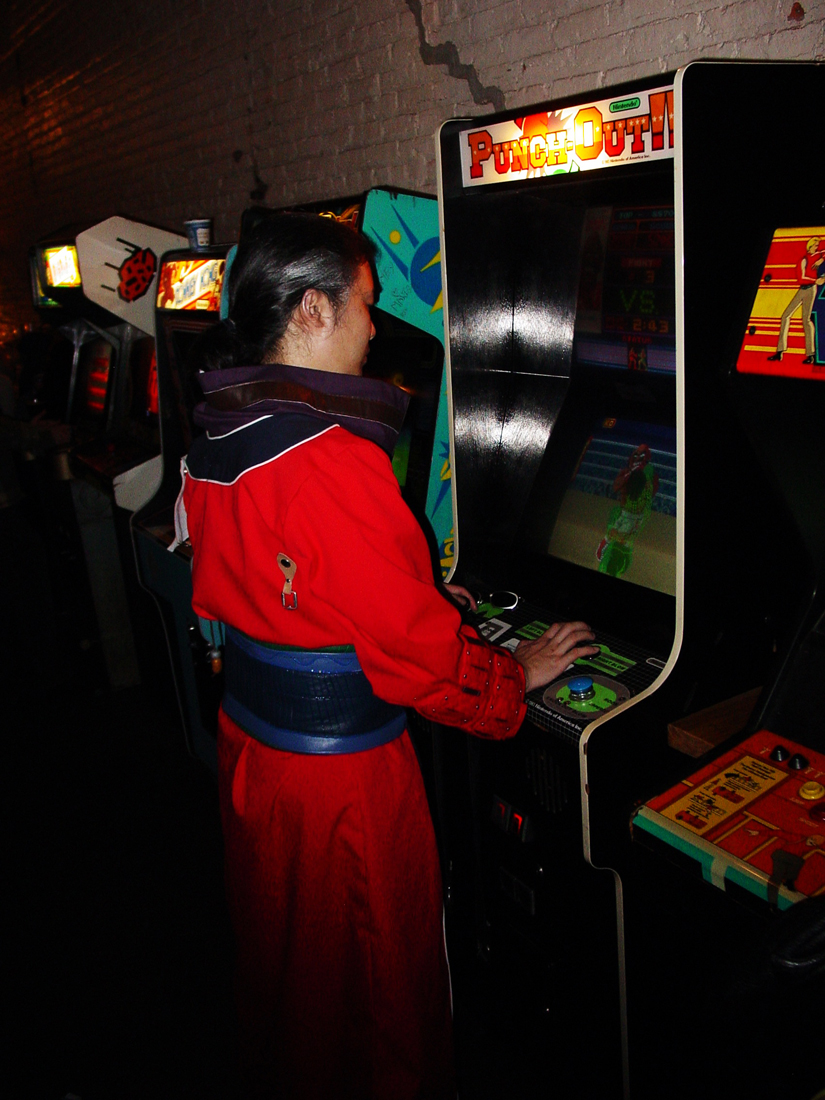
Punch-Out (1984) arcade cabinet

In March 1983, Sega released Alpha Denshi's arcade game Champion Baseball, which became a blockbuster success in Japanese arcades, with Sega comparing its impact on Japanese arcades to that of Space Invaders. Champion Baseball was a departure from the "space games" and "cartoon" action games that had previously dominated the arcades, and subsequently served as the prototype for later baseball video games. It had a split-screen format, displaying the playfield from two camera angles, one from the outfield and another close-up shot of the player and batter, while also giving players the option of selecting relief pitchers or pinch hitters, while an umpire looks on attentively to make the game calls. The game also had digitized voices for the umpire, and individual player statistics.

Sports games became more popular across arcades worldwide with the arrival of Konami's Track & Field, known as Hyper Olympic in Japan, introduced in September 1983. It was an Olympic-themed athletics game that had multiple Olympic track-and-field events (including the 100-meter dash, long jump, javelin throw, 110-meter hurdles, hammer throw, and high jump) and allowed up to four players to compete. It had a horizontal side-scrolling format, depicting one or two tracks at a time, a large scoreboard that displayed world records and current runs, and a packed audience in the background. Despite the industry's hype for laserdisc games at the time, Track & Field became the most well-received game at the Amusement Machine Show (AM Show) in Tokyo and the Amusement & Music Operators Association (AMOA) show in the United States. The game sold 38,000 arcade units in Japan, became one of the top five highest-grossing arcade games of 1984 in the United States, and the top-grossing arcade game of 1984 in the United Kingdom. It was also the basis for an organized video game competition that drew more than a million players in 1984. The success of Track & Field spawned other similar Olympic video games.

Numerous sports video games were subsequently released in arcades after Track & Field, including American football games such as 10-Yard Fight (1983) by Irem and Goal to Go (1984) by Stern Electronics, boxing video games such as Nintendo's Punch-Out! (1984), martial arts sports fighting games such as Technōs Japan's Karate Champ (1984), the Nintendo VS. System titles VS. Tennis and VS. Baseball, Taito's golf game Birdie King II, and Data East's Tag Team Wrestling. 10-Yard Fight in 1983 had a career mode, where the player progresses from high school, to college, professional, playoff, and Super Bowl, as the difficulty increases with each step. Irem's waterskiing game Tropical Angel had a female player character, and was one of the two most well-received games at the September 1983 AM Show (along with Hyper Olympic) for its graphics and gameplay. Another sports game with female player characters was Taito's Joshi Volleyball (Big Spikers), which topped the Japanese table arcade cabinet chart in December 1983. Kaneko's Roller Aces was a roller skating game played from a third-person perspective, while Technōs Japan released the wrestling game Tag Team Wrestling.

In the field of association football games, Alpha Denshi's Exciting Soccer (1983) featured digitized voices and a top-down overhead perspective, which was later popularized by Tehkan World Cup (1985) from Tehkan (later Tecmo). Tehkan World Cup was a multiplayer association football game with a trackball controller, where a button was used for kicking the ball and the trackball used for the direction and speed of the shot, with gameplay that was fairly realistic. It was a landmark title for association football games, considered revolutionary for its trackball control system, its top-down perspective that allows players to see more of the pitch, and its trackball-based game physics. It provided the basis for later association football games such as MicroProse Soccer (1988) and the Sensible Soccer series (1992 debut).

Several sports laserdisc games were released for arcades in 1984, including Universal's Top Gear which displayed 3D animated race car driving, while Sega's GP World and Taito's Laser Grand Prix displayed live-action footage. Sega also produced a bullfighting game, Bull Fight, and a multiple-watersports game Water Match (published by Bally Midway), which included swimming, kayaking and boat racing; while Taito released a female sports game based on high-school track & field, The Undoukai, and a dirt track racing game Buggy Challenge, with a buggy. Other dirt racing games from that year were dirt bike games: Nintendo's Excitebike and SNK's motocross game Jumping Cross. Nintendo also released a four-player racquet sport game, VS. Tennis (the Nintendo VS. System version of Tennis).

That same year, ice hockey games were also released: Alpha Denshi's Bull Fighter and Data East's Fighting Ice Hockey. Data East also released a lawn sports game Haro Gate Ball, based on croquet, while Nichibutsu released a game based on roller derby, Roller Jammer. Meanwhile, Technos Japan released a game based on sumo wrestling, Syusse Oozumou, and the first martial arts combat-sport game, Karate Champ, considered one of the most influential fighting games. In 1985, Nintendo released an arm wrestling game, Arm Wrestling, while Konami released a table tennis game that attempted to accurately reflect the sport, Konami's Ping Pong.

==== Homes ====
Gameplay screenshot of Intellivision World Series Baseball (1983)

On home consoles, Mattel released Intellivision World Series Baseball (IWSB), designed by Don Daglow and Eddie Dombrower, in late 1983. It is considered the earliest sports video game to use multiple camera angles to show the action in a manner resembling a sports television broadcast. Earlier sports games prior to this had displayed the entire field on screen, or scrolled across static top-down fields to show the action. IWSB mimicked television baseball coverage by showing the batter from a modified "center field" camera, the baserunners in corner insets and defensive plays from a camera behind the batter. It was also one of the first sports video games to feature audibly speaking digitized voices (as opposed to text), using the Mattel Intellivoice module. The game was sophisticated for its time, but was a commercial failure, released around the time of the video game crash of 1983 when the North American home video game market collapsed.

Nintendo released a series of highly successful sports games for the Nintendo Entertainment System console and the arcade Nintendo VS. System, starting with Baseball (1983) and Tennis (1984). They played an important role in the history of the Nintendo Entertainment System, as they were the earliest NES games released in North America, initially in the arcades and then with the console's launch. Nintendo's arcade version VS. Baseball (1984) was competing with Sega's earlier hit Champion Baseball in the arcades.

On home computers, Track & Field spawned similar hit Olympic games for computer platforms, such as Ocean Software's Daley Thompson's Decathlon (1984). Electronic Arts produced their first sports game for home computers, the basketball title Dr. J and Larry Bird Go One on One (1983), which was the first licensed sports game based on the names and likenesses of famous athletes; the inclusion of famous real world athletes would become one of the most important selling points for sports games. One on One became Electronic Arts' best-selling game, and the highest-selling computer sports game, having sold 400,000 copies by late 1988.

=== Further growth (1986–1994) ===
In the late 1980s, basketball video games gained popularity in arcades. Konami's Double Dribble (1986) featured colorful graphics, five-on-five gameplay, cutaway animations for slam dunks, and a digitized version of "The Star-Spangled Banner" theme. It was considered the most realistic basketball game upon release, with fast-paced action, detailed players, a large side-scrolling court, innovative cinematic dunks, and detailed sound effects, beginning a trend where presentation would play an increasingly important role in sports games. Magic Johnson's Fast Break (1988) by Arcadia Systems had detailed characters and audio clips of Magic Johnson's voice. Midway, who had not released a basketball game in sixteen years since Taito's TV Basketball in 1974, released Arch Rivals (1989), a two-on-two game featuring large players with distinct looks, a basketball court, a crowd, cheerleaders, four periods, the ability to rough up an opponent, and big dunks capable of backboard shattering. Konami's Punk Shot (1990) is an arcade basketball game with an element of violence, allowing players to physically attack each other, which CU Amiga magazine compared to the film Rollerball (1975).

The success of the Nintendo Entertainment System (NES) in North America led to the platform becoming a major platform for American sports video games. Basketball games included a port of Double Dribble, with a halo mechanic signifying the optimum release for shots, and Tecmo NBA Basketball (1992). American football video games included Tecmo Bowl (1987), which was ported to the NES with the NFL Players Association license, and Tecmo Super Bowl (1991), which introduced a season mode with nearly the entire NFL roster. Tecmo Super Bowl is considered to be one of the greatest and most influential games of all time, as it was the first mainstream sports video game with both the league and player association licenses, with ESPN ranking it the greatest sports video game of all time. Sega also developed American football games for their competing Master System console, Great Football in 1987 and American Pro Football (Walter Payton Football) in 1989, the latter very well received by critics at the time.

The late 1980s is considered the "Golden Age" of baseball video games. Namco's R.B.I. Baseball (1986) and the Atlus title Major League Baseball (1988) for the NES were the first fully licensed baseball video games. SNK's Baseball Stars (1989) was a popular arcade-style NES game, while Jaleco's NES title Bases Loaded (1987) was a simulation game with statistics. In 1988, EA released Earl Weaver Baseball, developed by Don Daglow and Eddie Dombrower, which for the first time combined a highly accurate simulation game with high quality graphics. This was also the first game in which an actual baseball manager provided the computer AI. In 1996 Computer Gaming World named EWB the 25th of its Best 150 Games of All Time, the second highest ranking for any sports game in that 1981–1996 period (after FPS Football).

The 1990s began in the 16-bit era, as a wave of fourth generation video game consoles were created to handle more complex games and graphics. The Sega Genesis/Mega Drive in particular became renowned for its sports video games, as it was more powerful than the NES and with Sega targeting an older audience than Nintendo's typically younger target demographic at the time. Basketball video games included EA's Lakers versus Celtics and the NBA Playoffs (1991), which launched the NBA Live series. World Series Baseball (1994) introduced the "catcher-cam" perspective, launching the World Series Baseball series and becoming the first game in the Sega Sports line.

In 1989, Electronic Arts producer Richard Hilleman hired GameStar's Scott Orr to re-design John Madden Football for the fast-growing Sega Genesis. In 1990, Orr and Hilleman released Madden Football. They focused on producing a head-to-head two-player game with an intuitive interface and responsive controls. Electronic Arts had only expected to sell around 75,000 units, but instead the title sold around 400,000 units.

In 1990, Taito released Football Champ, an association football game that allows up to four players in both competitive and cooperative gameplay. It also let players perform a number of actions, including a back heel, power kick, high kick, sliding tackle, super shot, and fouling other players (kicking, punching, and pulling shirts), which the player can get away with if the referee isn't looking, or get a yellow or red penalty card for if he is. In 1991, the American football game Tecmo Super Bowl was the first mainstream sports game to feature both the league and player association licenses of the sport it emulated; previous titles either had one license or the other, but Tecmo Super Bowl was the first to feature real NFL players on real teams.

Orr joined EA full-time in 1991 after the success of Madden on the Sega Genesis, and began a ten-year period of his career where he personally supervised the production of the Madden Football series. During this time EA formed EA Sports, a brand name used for sports games they produced. EA Sports created several ongoing series, with a new version released each year to reflect the changes in the sport and its teams since the previous release.

Sega launched its own competing NFL series on the Sega Genesis. The gameplay of Sega's earlier 1987 Master System title Great Football (1987) was the basis for Joe Montana Football (1991), developed by EA and published by Sega for the Genesis. Sega then released their own sequel without EA's involvement, Joe Montana II: Sports Talk Football (1991), which became the first American football game with audio commentary. After Sega acquired the NFL license, they shortened the title to NFL Sports Talk Football Starring Joe Montana, which later became known as Sega's NFL series. Due to strong competition from Madden, the series was cancelled in 1997.

Licensed basketball games began becoming more common by the early 1990s, including Sega's Pat Riley Basketball (1990) and Acme Interactive's David Robinson's Supreme Court (1992) for the Sega Genesis, and Hudson Soft's Bill Laimbeer's Combat Basketball (1991) for the Super Nintendo Entertainment System (SNES). EA followed Jordan vs. Bird: One on One (1988) with Lakers versus Celtics and the NBA Playoffs (1989), the latter ported to the Genesis in 1991, which added more simulation aspects to the subgenre. In the arcades, Midway followed Arch Rivals with NBA Jam (1993), which introduced digitized sprites similar to their fighting game Mortal Kombat (1992), combined with a gameplay formula similar to Arch Rivals. In its first twelve months of release, NBA Jam generated over $1 billion to become the highest-grossing arcade sports game of all time.

FIFA International Soccer (1993), the first game in EA's FIFA series of association football video games, released on the Sega Mega Drive and became the best-selling home video game of 1993 in the United Kingdom. In contrast to the top-down perspective of earlier association football games, FIFA introduced an isometric perspective to the genre. International Superstar Soccer (1994), the first game in Konami's International Superstar Soccer (ISS) series, released for the SNES. A rivalry subsequently emerged between the FIFA and ISS franchises.

=== Transition to 3D polygons (1994–1997) ===
In the 1990s, 3D graphics were introduced in sports games. Early uses of flat-shaded polygons date back to 1991, with home computer games such as 4D Sports Boxing and Winter Challenge. However, it was not until the mid-1990s that 3D polygons were popularized in sports games.

Sega's arcade title Virtua Striker (1994) was the first association football game to use 3D graphics, and was also notable for its early use of texture mapping. Meanwhile, Sierra Online released American football title Front Page Sports Football in 1995 for the PC. The following year, Computer Gaming World named it twelfth of the Best 150 Games of All Time, the highest ranking sports game on the list.

International Superstar Soccer Pro (ISS Pro), released for the PlayStation in 1997, was considered a "game-changer" for association football games, which had been largely dominated by rival FIFA on home systems for the last several years. Developed by Konami Tokyo, ISS Pro introduced a new 3D engine capable of better graphics and more sophisticated gameplay than its rival. Whereas FIFA had a simpler "arcade-style" approach to its gameplay, ISS Pro introduced more complex simulation gameplay emphasizing tactics and improvisation, enabled by tactical variety such as nine in-match strategy options.

In 1997, Electronic Gaming Monthly reported that sports games accounted for roughly 50% of console software sales.

=== Extreme sports enter into the mainstream (1996–2001) ===
At the end of the 20th and beginning of the 21st century, extreme sport video games began to appear more frequently.

Namco's Alpine Racer (1994) was a skiing winter sports simulator that became a major success in arcades during the mid-1990s. This led to a wave of similar sports games capitalizing on its success during the late 1990s, from companies such as Sega, Namco, Konami and Innovative Concepts.

In 1996, two snowboarding video games were released: Namco's Alpine Surfer in the arcades, and the UEP Systems game Cool Boarders for the PlayStation console. The following year, Square's popular role-playing video game, Final Fantasy VII, included a snowboarding minigame that was later released as an independent snowboarding game, Final Fantasy VII Snowboarding, for mobile phones. In 2000, SSX was released. Based around boardercross, the game featured fast downhill races, avoiding various objects while using others to perform jumps and increase the player's speed.

In 1997, Sega released one of the first mainstream skateboarding games, Top Skater, in the arcades, where it introduced a skateboard controller interface. Top Skater served as a basic foundation for later skateboarding games. The following year saw the release of the console skateboarding game Street Sk8er, developed by Atelier Double and published by Electronic Arts. In 1999, the subgenre was further popularized by Tony Hawk's Pro Skater, an arcade-like skateboarding game where players were challenged to execute elaborate tricks or collect a series of elements hidden throughout the level. Tony Hawk's went on to be one of the most popular sports game franchises.

=== Sports games become big business (2001–2005) ===
Association football games became more popular in the 2000s. Konami's ISS series spawned the Pro Evolution Soccer (PES) series in the early 2000s. A rivalry subsequently emerged between FIFA and PES, considered the "greatest rivalry" in the history of sports video games. PES became known for having "faster-paced tactical play" and more varied emergent gameplay, while FIFA was known for having more licenses. The FIFA series had sold over 16 million units by 2000, while the PES series had sold more than 10 million units by 2002. The sales gap between the two franchises had narrowed by the mid-2000s.

On 13 December 2004, Electronic Arts began a string of deals that granted exclusive rights to several prominent sports organizations, starting with the NFL. This was quickly followed with two deals in January 2008 securing rights to the AFL and ESPN licenses. This was a particularly hard blow to Sega, the previous holder of the ESPN license, who had already been affected by EA's NFL deal. As the market for football brands was being quickly taken by EA, Take-Two Interactive responded by contacting the Major League Baseball Players Association and signing a deal that granted exclusive third-party major-league baseball rights; a deal not as restrictive, as first-party projects were still allowed. The NBA was then approached by several developers, but declined to enter into an exclusivity agreement, instead granting long-term licenses to Electronic Arts, Take-Two Interactive, Midway Games, Sony, and Atari. In April 2005, EA furthered its hold on American football licensing by securing rights to all NCAA brands.

=== Motion detection ===
==== Sega Activator: IR motion detection (1993–1994) ====
In 1993, Sega released the Sega Activator, a motion detection game controller designed to respond to a player's body movements, for their Genesis console. The Activator was based on the Light Harp, a MIDI controller invented by Assaf Gurner. He was an Israeli musician and Kung Fu martial artist who researched inter disciplinarian concepts to create the experience of playing an instrument using the whole body's motion. It was released for the Mega Drive (Genesis) in 1993. It could read the player's physical movements and was the first controller to allow full-body motion sensing, The original invention related to a 3 octaves musical instrument that could interpret the user's gestures into musical notes via MIDI protocol. The invention was registered as patent initially in Israel on 11 May 1988, after 4 years of R&D. In 1992, the first complete Light Harp was created by Assaf Gurner and Oded Zur, and was presented to Sega of America.

Like the Light Harp, the Activator is an octagonal frame that lies on the floor. Light-emitting diodes (LEDs) on the frame vertically project thin, invisible beams of infrared light. When something, such as a player's arm or leg, interrupts a beam, the device reads the distance at which the interruption occurred, and interprets the signal as a command. The device can also interpret signals from multiple beams simultaneously (i.e., chords) as a distinct command.

Sega designed special Activator motions for a few of their own game releases. By tailoring motion signals specifically for a game, Sega attempted to provide a more intuitive gaming experience. A player could, for example, compete in Greatest Heavyweights of the Ring or Eternal Champions by miming punches.

Despite these efforts, the Activator was a commercial failure. Like the Power Glove of 1989, it was widely rejected for its "unwieldiness and inaccuracy".

==== Wii Remote: IR motion detection with accelerometry (2006–2009) ====
In 2006, Nintendo released Wii Sports, a sports game for the Wii console in which the player had to physically move their Wii Remote to move their avatar known as a Mii. The game contained five different sports—boxing, bowling, golf, tennis, and baseball—which could all be played individually or with multiple players. Players could also track their skill progress through the game, as they became more proficient at the different sports, and use the training mode to practice particular situations. As of 2013, Wii Sports became the second-highest selling video game of all time.

The popularity of the Wii and its bundled Wii Sports opened the way for other physically reactive sports-based video games, including from third-parties, such as Super Swing Golf and We Love Golf! based on the sport of golf, Rockstar Games Presents Table Tennis based on table tennis, MLB Power Pros based on baseball, and Grand Slam Tennis and Virtua Tennis 2009 both of which made use of the advanced Wii MotionPlus remote. Nintendo themselves also pushed with further motion-based games such as Mario & Sonic at the Olympic Games, in which players used the Wii Remote to simulate running, jumping and other Olympic sports. In 2008, Nintendo released Wii Fit, which allowed players to do aerobic and fitness exercises using the Wii Balance Board; third-party developers also designed games using the Board, such as the skiing game We Ski. In a similar light, 2008 saw the release of Mario Kart Wii, a racing game which allowed the player to use their remote with a Wii Wheel to act as a steering wheel, akin to those on traditional arcade racing games.

=== Sports games today (2010–present) ===
Logo of the EA Sports FC video game series

The most popular subgenre in Europe is association football games, which up until 2010 was dominated by EA Sports with the FIFA series and Konami with the Pro Evolution Soccer (PES) series. While FIFA was commercially ahead, the sales gap between the two franchises had narrowed. FIFA responded by borrowing gameplay elements from PES to improve FIFA, which eventually pulled ahead commercially by a significant margin in the 2010s and emerged as the world's most successful sports video game franchise.

In North America, the sports genre is currently dominated by EA Sports and 2K Sports, who hold licenses to produce games based on official leagues. EA's franchises include the Madden NFL series, the NHL series, the PGA Tour series, the UFC series, the F1 series, the EA Sports FC series, and the NBA Live series. 2K Sports' franchises include the NBA 2K, PGA Tour 2K and WWE 2K series. 2K recently released TopSpin 2K25. All of these games feature real leagues, competitions and players. These games continue to sell well today despite many of the product lines being over a decade old, and receive, for the most part, consistently good reviews.

With 2K & EA Sports' domination and many sports leagues carrying exclusive licences, the North American sports video game market has become very difficult to enter; competing games in any of the above genres, with the exception of racing games, tend to be unsuccessful. This has led to a sharp drop in sports-themed titles over recent years especially with arcade titles. One of the most notable exceptions is Konami's Pro Evolution Soccer series, which is often hailed as an alternative to the FIFA series, but does not contain as many licensed teams, players, kits, or competitions. Another deviation from the norm is Sony's MLB The Show series, which now has a monopoly on the baseball genre after the withdrawal of 2K after MLB 2K13. Racing games, due to the variation that the sport can offer in terms of tracks, cars and styles, offer more room for competition and the selection of games on offer has been considerably greater (examples being F1 and the World Rally Championship, and many unlicensed games). Sports management games, while not as popular as they used to be, live on through small and independent software development houses. Management titles today have transitioned to the very popular fantasy sports leagues, which are available through many websites such as Yahoo. Independent developers are also creating sports titles like Super Mega Baseball, The Golf Club, and Freestyle2: Street Basketball.

Nintendo has been able to make an impact upon the sports market by producing several Mario-themed titles, such as Mario Sports Mix, Mario Golf: Super Rush, Mario Sports Superstars, Mario Tennis Fever, and Mario Strikers: Battle League. These titles sell respectfully, but are only available on Nintendo's video game consoles, for example GameCube, Nintendo 64, Nintendo 3DS, Wii, Wii U, Nintendo Switch, and Nintendo Switch 2.

== See also ==
- Lists of sports video games
