= Madden NFL 19 =

2018 video game

- Standard Edition cover art featuring Antonio Brown
- Developer: EA Tiburon
- Publisher: EA Sports
- Director: Michael Young
- Producer: Ben Haumiller
- Composer: John Debney
- Series: Madden NFL
- Engine: Frostbite 3
- Platforms: PlayStation 4; Xbox One; Windows
- Release: August 10, 2018
- Genre: Sports
- Modes: Single-player, multiplayer

Madden NFL 19 is an American football sports video game based on the National Football League (NFL), developed and published by EA Sports. The 29th installment of the long-running Madden NFL series, the game was released for PlayStation 4, Xbox One, and Windows on August 10, 2018, the first time it released for the latter since Madden NFL 08.

Pittsburgh Steelers wide receiver Antonio Brown is the cover athlete of the standard edition of the game, while Pro Football Hall of Fame wide receiver Terrell Owens is on the cover of the "Hall of Fame" edition, featured in a Dallas Cowboys uniform.

== Development ==
In May 2018, Pro Football Hall of Fame member Terrell Owens was announced to be on the cover of the "Hall of Fame" edition of the game. Owens is featured in a Dallas Cowboys uniform, a move which was questioned by some as Owens played eight seasons with the San Francisco 49ers, compared to just three with the Cowboys. The game's standard edition cover features former Pittsburgh Steelers wide receiver Antonio Brown.

The soundtrack for the game features over 30 tracks from artists such as Migos, Pusha T, Post Malone, T.I., N.O.R.E., Schoolboy Q, Fat Joe, Anderson .Paak, Jay Rock, Berner, 2 Chainz, BlocBoy JB, Young Thug, Cardi B, Lil Skies, and Nicki Minaj, among an original score by John Debney. EA added several more tracks to the game over the course of the 2018 NFL season.

== Gameplay ==
Players are able to take part in interactive touchdown celebrations

Madden NFL 19 featured "real player motions," allowing players to push blockers to gain more yards while running and make realistic cuts up-field after the catch, as well as take part in interactive touchdown celebrations for the first time since Madden NFL 09 including team celebrations, which were made legal by the NFL for the 2017 season. There were also changes to the Ultimate Team mode, introducing three vs three online matchups as well as a "Solo Battles" game mode, a leaderboard-driven reward system that measures players' performances in daily single-player challenges. The game also featured a sequel to Longshot, Madden NFL 18's single-player story-driven mode, with more focus on football gameplay and NFL-related events.

=== Longshot: Homecoming ===
In continuation of the Longshot story mode in Madden 18, protagonist Devin Wade is revealed to be playing in training camp for his hometown team, the Dallas Cowboys. On the other hand, Devin's best friend Colt Cruise is a struggling country singer living in his hometown Mathis, Texas. Colt runs into his long-lost father who reveals Colt has a half-sister, Loretta, and forces Colt to take care of her.

Colt still dreams of becoming an NFL wide receiver and tries out for the Miami Dolphins before getting cut after the first preseason game. When Colt and Devin's high school football coach Hank Jamison dies from illness, Colt decides to step up as the Mathis Bullfrogs' head coach. With Mathis High School fearing a merger with a rival school due to insufficient funds, Devin, now a member of the Houston Texans, donates money along with Deshaun Watson and newly acquired receiver Antonio Brown, who both appear as themselves.

Devin, in his first game as a starting quarterback, defeats the New England Patriots while Mathis comes up with enough donations with the help of the Texans and Colt to save the high school as Colt remains the coach of Mathis High School.

The voice cast includes JR Lemon as Devin Wade, Scott Porter as Colt Cruise, Joey King as Loretta Cruise, Ron Cephas Jones as Earl Coates, Rob Schneider as Donnie Marks, Chris Sullivan as Mack Mcglinn, as well as cameos from Tom Brady and Bill Cowher playing themselves.

== Release ==
The game was released for PlayStation 4, Xbox One, and Windows on August 10, 2018, with the Windows release being the first for the series since Madden NFL 08 in 2007. A "Hall of Fame Edition" was released three days early for subscribers of the EA Access program.

== Reception ==
Reception

Aggregate score
Aggregator	Score
Metacritic	(XONE) 81/100 (PS4) 80/100 (PC) 80/100

Review scores
Publication	Score
Electronic Gaming Monthly	7/10
Game Informer	8/10
GameSpot	8/10
GamesRadar+	4.5/5
IGN	8.9/10
PC Gamer (US)	75/100
USgamer	3.5/5

According to review aggregator Metacritic, Madden NFL 19 received "generally favorable" reviews from game critics despite receiving "generally unfavorable" ratings from users.

In a review for IGN, Dustin Toms wrote: "Madden 19 has finally cracked that slightly repetitive feel that can make it tough to go on, game after game. With Real Player Motion delivering a fluid on-the-field experience, and Franchise mode customization offering another level of realism, Madden is in a great place." Bradley Russell of GamesRadar+ praised the updated catching and running mechanics as well as the Longshot: Homecoming mode, calling the game a "stunning return to form" for the series, and one of the "finest" in years. GameSpot praised the animation and updates to the commentary, although noted the changes to Longshot were disappointing.

Before its release, the game was criticized for censoring quarterback Colin Kaepernick's name from the song "Big Bank", which appears on the soundtrack. The verse came from Big Sean, who called the action "disappointing and appalling". EA responded to the criticism by saying that it was a mistake by members of their team who misunderstood the fact that just because they did not have rights to include Kaepernick's likeness in the game as a player because he is no longer in the NFL Players Association, it does not apply to him being mentioned elsewhere. Before the game was released, EA released an update to restore his name in the song.

== 2018 shooting ==
On August 26, 2018, a shooting occurred during a livestreamed tournament event for the game at the Jacksonville Landing in Jacksonville, Florida. It resulted in numerous injuries and two deaths, as well as the suicide of the shooter, who had participated in the tournament but had lost earlier in the day.
