= 2008 Poinsettia Bowl =

2008 San Diego County Credit Union Poinsettia Bowl
Boise State Broncos	TCU Horned Frogs
(12–0)	(10–2)
WAC	Mountain West
16	17
Head coach: Chris Petersen	Head coach: Gary Patterson
AP / Coaches / BCS; 9 / 9 / 9	AP / Coaches / BCS; 11 / 11 / 11
	1	2	3	4	Total
Boise State	10	3	0	3	16
TCU	0	7	3	7	17
- Date: December 23, 2008
- Season: 2008
- Stadium: Qualcomm Stadium
- Location: San Diego, California
- MVP: QB Andy Dalton, TCU (Offensive); S Stephen Hodge, TCU (Defensive)
- Referee: Jon Bible (Big 12)
- Attendance: 34,628
- Payout: US$500,000 Per Team

United States TV coverage
- Network: ESPN
- Announcers: Rece Davis (Play by Play); Mark May (Analyst); Lou Holtz (Analyst); Todd Harris (Sideline)
- Nielsen ratings: 3.2

The 2008 San Diego County Credit Union Poinsettia Bowl was the fourth edition of the college football bowl game, and was played at Qualcomm Stadium in San Diego, California. The game started at 5 p.m. US PST on Tuesday, December 23, 2008. The game, simulcast on ESPN and ESPN Radio with Rece Davis, Mark May, and Lou Holtz announcing, pit the Boise State Broncos against the Texas Christian Horned Frogs. In the game, TCU overcame a 13–0 deficit to pull off an impressive 17–16 win over Boise State.

With Boise State ranked 9th and TCU ranked 11th, this bowl pairing featured teams both ranked higher than the teams playing in a BCS game during the same season, the 2009 Orange Bowl, which featured #12 Cincinnati against #21 Virginia Tech, a first in BCS history.

TCU and Boise State would face off in a bowl game again the following season when both played in a BCS game, the 2010 Fiesta Bowl.

== Scoring summary ==
Scoring Play	Score
1st Quarter
Boise — Kyle Brotzman 30-yard FG, 11:32	Boise 3–0
Boise — Ian Johnson 20-yard TD run (Brotzman kick), 7:35	Boise 10–0
2nd Quarter
Boise — Brotzman 23-yard FG, 5:51	Boise 13–0
TCU — Aaron Brown 16-yard TD run (Ross Evans kick), :24	Boise 13–7
3rd Quarter
TCU — Evans 32-yard FG, :46	Boise 13–10
4th Quarter
TCU — Joseph Turner 17-yard TD run (Evans kick), 8:51	TCU 17–13
Boise — Brotzman 33-yard FG, 4:47	TCU 17–16
