= Tim Ryan (American football, born 1967) =

American football player

No. 96, 99
- Positions: Defensive tackle, defensive end

Personal information
- Born: September 8, 1967 (age 59); Memphis, Tennessee, U.S.
- Listed height: 6 ft 4 in (1.93 m)
- Listed weight: 268 lb (122 kg)

Career information
- High school: Oak Grove (San Jose, California)
- College: USC
- NFL draft: 1990: 3rd round, 61st overall pick

Career history
- Chicago Bears (1990–1993)

Awards and highlights
- Consensus All-American (1989); First-team All-American (1988); Pop Warner Trophy (1989); 2× First-team All-Pac-10 (1988, 1989); Second-team All-Pac-10 (1987)

Career NFL statistics
- Sacks: 4.5
- Fumble recoveries: 2
- Stats at Pro Football Reference

Timothy Edward Ryan (born September 8, 1967) is an American former professional football player who was a defensive tackle for the Chicago Bears of the National Football League (NFL). He played college football for the USC Trojans. He is currently a radio color analyst for the San Francisco 49ers, and previously an NFL analyst for Fox television and co-host of "Movin' the Chains" on Sirius XM NFL Radio.

== Early life ==
Tim played for the Oak Grove Eagles high school varsity football team from 1983 to 1985 where he started on both the offensive and defensive line and was a Mercury-News All-CCS selection.

== College career ==
A two-time All-American (1988, 1989) at the University of Southern California, Ryan is the all-time leading tackler in school history. The former team captain led the Trojans to three Rose Bowls and holds the team season-record for sacks with 20.

Ryan started the season opener against Illinois in 1986 as the first true freshman since Riki Ellison in 1978.

== Professional career ==
Ryan was a third-round draft choice (61st pick overall) in the 1990 NFL draft. He played for the Chicago Bears between 1990 and 1993.

== Sportscasting career ==
Ryan has been commenting NFL games since 2002. For 12 years, he served as a color analyst for Fox NFL telecasts, teaming with various play-by-play announcers including Chris Myers, Sam Rosen, Curt Menefee, and Ron Pitts. (Ryan is not to be confused with another sportscaster also named Tim Ryan, who called play-by-play for Fox in 1998.) Ryan also teamed with Matt Vasgersian for the 2009 Fiesta Bowl, replacing Terry Donahue and Pat Haden. He also worked for Sirius NFL Radio (Channel 88), hosting "Movin' the Chains" from 3-7pm with Pat Kirwan and doing analysis for San Francisco 49ers preseason games. He is a regular contributor to KGMZ radio ("95.7 The Game") in the Bay Area.`

It was announced by Pat Kirwan during the September 2, 2013 broadcast of "Movin' the Chains" on SiriusXM radio that Ryan had accepted an enhanced opportunity with FOX Sports and would not be returning to "Movin' the Chains". His hosting duties in that show were assumed by Jim Miller, former NFL quarterback for the Chicago Bears.

In January 2014 it was announced that Ryan was leaving FOX Sports to replace Eric Davis as color analyst for the San Francisco 49ers radio network. Since the onset of the 49ers 2019 season, Ryan has teamed up with play-by-play announcer Greg Papa on radio broadcasts. In December 2019, Ryan was suspended as the 49ers' color analyst due to a controversial comment made on the Murph and Mac show on KNBR Radio about Baltimore Ravens quarterback Lamar Jackson's success at faking hand-offs due to his dark skin and the dark color of the football, and the dark color of his uniform.
