= 2010 Fiesta Bowl =

2010 Tostitos Fiesta Bowl
- BCS Bowl Game; 39th Fiesta Bowl
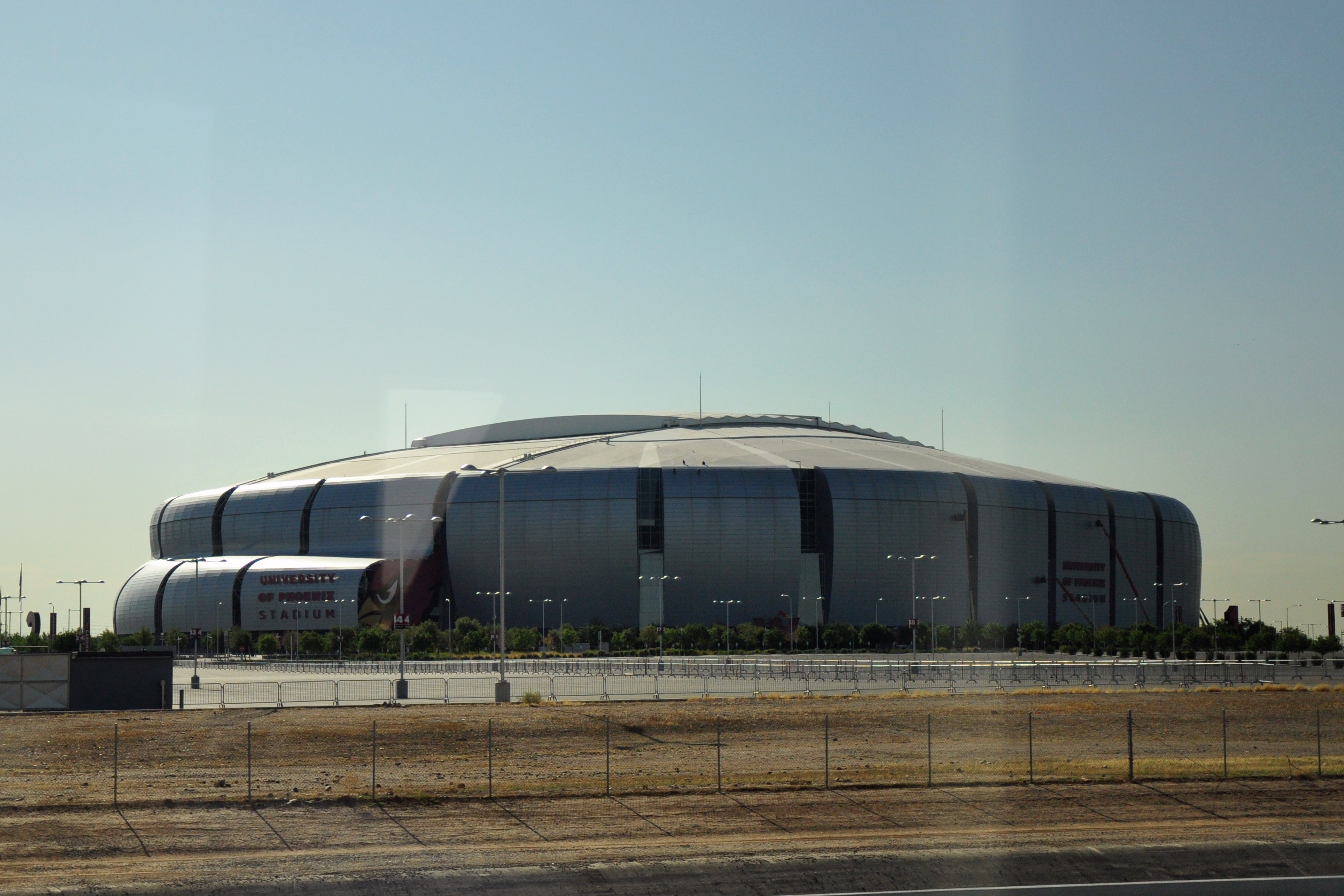
- University of Phoenix Stadium in Glendale, Arizona, hosted the Fiesta Bowl.
| Boise State Broncos | TCU Horned Frogs |
| (13–0) | (12–0) |
| WAC | Mountain West |
| 17 | 10 |
| Head coach: Chris Petersen | Head coach: Gary Patterson |
| AP / Coaches / BCS; 6 / 6 / 6 | AP / Coaches / BCS; 3 / 3 / 4 |
| | 1 | 2 | 3 | 4 | Total |
|---|---|---|---|---|---|
| Boise State | 7 | 3 | 0 | 7 | 17 |
| TCU | 0 | 7 | 3 | 0 | 10 |
- Date: January 4, 2010
- Season: 2009
- Stadium: University of Phoenix Stadium
- Location: Glendale, Arizona
- MVP: Offensive: Kyle Efaw; Defensive: Brandyn Thompson
- National anthem: Michael McDonald
- Referee: Bill LeMonnier (Big Ten Conference)
- Attendance: 73,227
- Payout: US$18,000,000

United States TV coverage
- Network: FOX
- Announcers: Sam Rosen (play-by-play); Tim Ryan (color); Chris Myers (sideline); Brad Nessler (play-by-play); Todd Blackledge (color); Erin Andrews (sideline)
- Nielsen ratings: 8.2

The 2010 Tostitos Fiesta Bowl game was a post-season college football bowl game between the #4 TCU Horned Frogs, champions of the Mountain West Conference, and the #6 Boise State Broncos, champions of the Western Athletic Conference. The game was played Monday, January 4, 2010, at University of Phoenix Stadium in Glendale, Arizona. The game was part of the 2009–10 Bowl Championship Series (BCS) of the 2009 NCAA Division I FBS football season and was the concluding game of the season for both teams involved.

For the second consecutive year, TCU and BSU faced off in a bowl game of historic significance. In the 2008 Poinsettia Bowl, TCU and Boise State played in the first non-BCS game ever in which both teams were ranked higher than both participants in a BCS bowl game in the same season (specifically the 2009 Orange Bowl), with the Horned Frogs winning 17–16.

Boise State would finish its season 14–0, making the Broncos the second team in BCS history (after Ohio State in 2002) to finish with a perfect 14–0 record; Alabama would become the third team to do so just a few nights later, defeating Texas 37–21 in the 2010 BCS National Championship Game.

== Milestones ==
The historic milestones of this game were:

- For the first time ever, two teams from the BCS non-AQ (automatic qualifying) conferences earned BCS bowl berths in the same season. Accordingly, this was the first BCS game ever to feature two such teams. TCU has since joined an AQ conference, the Big 12 Conference, where TCU has reunited with some of its former Southwest Conference rivals.
- For the first time ever, a BCS non-AQ conference team was selected via an at-large invitation (BSU). (TCU earned an AQ bid via rule 3 of the BCS selection rules.)
- Also for the first time ever, two unbeaten teams squared off in a BCS game other than the National Championship Game.
- Boise State became the second team in Football Bowl Subdivision (FBS) history to finish the season 14–0 (the other team being the 2002 Ohio State Buckeyes. Alabama became the third team to go 14–0 three days later).

== Also known as... ==
Because both non-AQ teams were placed in the same bowl game, the bowl was derisively referred to as the "Separate But Equal Bowl", the "Quarantine Bowl", the "Fiasco Bowl", the "BCS Kids' Table", etc. Some had called for a boycott because of this. There was wide speculation that the BCS bowl selection committees maneuvered TCU and Boise State into the same bowl so as to deny them the chances to "embarrass" two AQ conference representatives in separate bowls, as Boise State had done in the 2007 Fiesta Bowl and Utah had done in the 2005 Fiesta Bowl and 2009 Sugar Bowl (prior to the game, non-AQ teams were 3–1 versus AQ teams in BCS bowls). In response, Fiesta Bowl CEO John Junker called those allegations "the biggest load of crap that I've ever heard in my life" and said that "[w]e're in the business of doing things that are on behalf of our bowl game and we don't do the bidding of someone else to our detriment." This was a rematch of the Poinsettia Bowl from the previous season.

In the weeks prior to the game, a different controversy arose when past and present employees made public allegations that the Fiesta Bowl had made illegal campaign contributions.

WWE personality John Cena was the grand marshal and the coin tosser for the event.

The Broncos won the game by a score of 17 points to 10.

== Game summary ==
=== Scoring summary ===
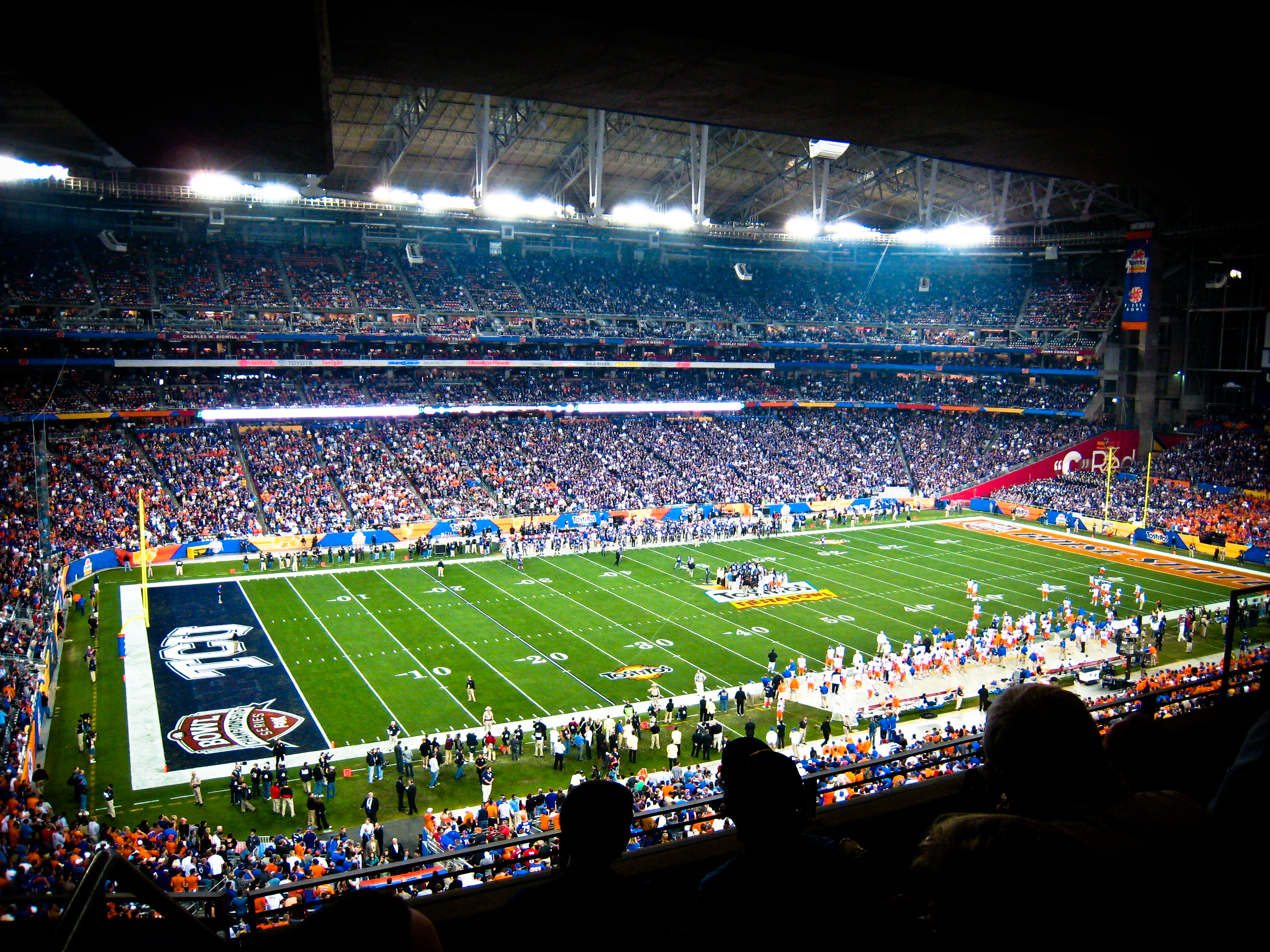
The 2010 Fiesta Bowl with Boise State against TCU

| Scoring Play | Score |
|---|---|
1st Quarter
| BSU — Brandyn Thompson 51-yard interception return (Kyle Brotzman kick), 11:40 | BSU 7–0 |
2nd Quarter
| BSU — Kyle Brotzman 40-yard field goal, 8:02 | BSU 10–0 |
| TCU — Curtis Clay 30-yard TD pass from Andy Dalton (Ross Evans kick), 0:49 | BSU 10–7 |
3rd Quarter
| TCU — Ross Evans 29-yard field goal, 3:52 | TIE 10–10 |
4th Quarter
| BSU — Doug Martin rush for 2 yards TD (Kyle Brotzman kick), 7:21 | BSU 17–10 |

== Highlights ==
The key play of the game came in the fourth quarter when, faced with fourth down from their own 33, Boise State pulled off another Fiesta Bowl trick play, this time a fake punt, known as "The Riddler". Punter Kyle Brotzman threw a 30-yard pass to Kyle Efaw to keep the drive going, which ultimately resulted in Martin's touchdown run.
