= The Bad Batch =

The Bad Batch may refer to:

- Clone Force 99, a special clone trooper unit in the Star Wars universe
  - Star Wars: The Bad Batch, a 2021 animated television series based on this unit
  - "The Bad Batch", an episode of the Star Wars: The Clone Wars TV series
- Bad Batch, a 2010 film with JR Lemon
- The Bad Batch (film), a 2016 dystopic thriller film
