= Andy Dalton =

American football player (born 1987)

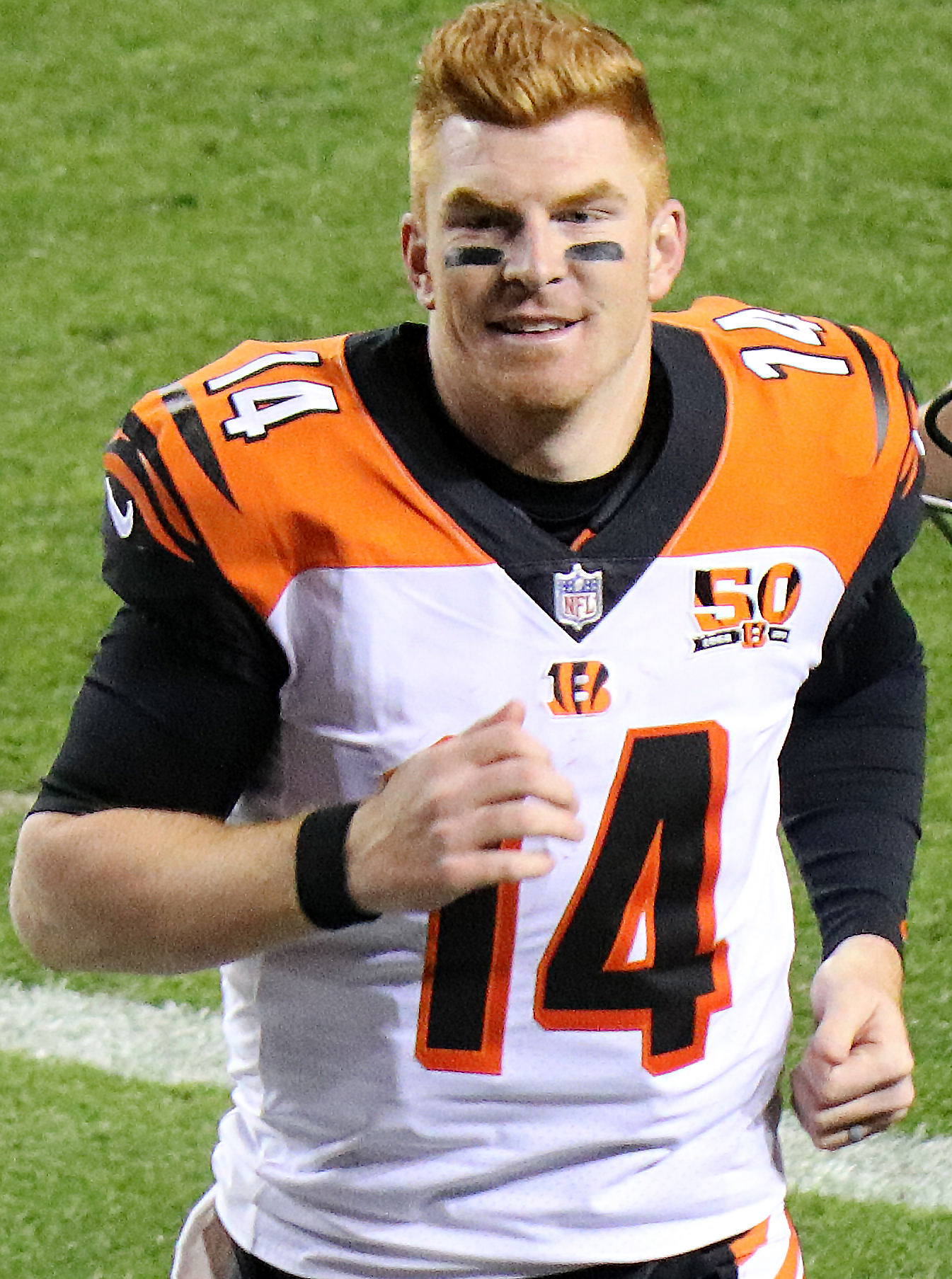
- Dalton with the Cincinnati Bengals in 2017

No. 13 – Atlanta Falcons
- Position: Quarterback
- Roster status: Active

Personal information
- Born: October 29, 1987 (age 39); Katy, Texas, U.S.
- Listed height: 6 ft 2 in (1.88 m)
- Listed weight: 220 lb (100 kg)

Career information
- High school: Katy
- College: TCU (2006–2010)
- NFL draft: 2011: 2nd round, 35th overall pick

Career history
- Cincinnati Bengals (2011–2019); Dallas Cowboys (2020); Chicago Bears (2021); New Orleans Saints (2022); Carolina Panthers (2023–2025); Philadelphia Eagles (2026); Atlanta Falcons (2026–present)

Awards and highlights
- 3× Pro Bowl (2011, 2014, 2016); 2× MW Offensive Player of the Year (2009, 2010); 2× First-team All-MW (2009, 2010)

Career NFL statistics as of Week 3, 2026
- Passing attempts: 5,652
- Passing completions: 3,539
- Completion percentage: 62.6%
- TD–INT: 254–152
- Passing yards: 39,793
- Passer rating: 87.5
- Stats at Pro Football Reference

Andrew Gregory Dalton (born October 29, 1987) is an American professional football quarterback for the Atlanta Falcons of the National Football League (NFL). Nicknamed "the Red Rifle", he played college football for the TCU Horned Frogs, winning MW Offensive Player of the Year twice and becoming the school's leader in quarterback wins. He was selected by the Cincinnati Bengals in the second round of the 2011 NFL draft.

In his nine-year tenure with the Bengals, Dalton led the team to five consecutive playoff appearances from 2011 to 2015 and received three Pro Bowl selections. In his first season, he and wide receiver A. J. Green set records for completions and yards by a rookie quarterback/receiver combination. Dalton also set the Bengals franchise records for passing touchdowns, single-season passing yards, and single-season passing touchdowns.

Despite his early regular season success, Dalton went winless in the postseason and was released after four consecutive losing seasons, with the Bengals drafting Joe Burrow to replace him. He became a journeyman quarterback afterwards, playing for the Dallas Cowboys, Chicago Bears, New Orleans Saints, Carolina Panthers, and Philadelphia Eagles, spending three years with Carolina and a year or less with the other teams.

== Early life ==
Dalton attended Katy High School in Katy, Texas, where he played for the Tigers football team. He split time as a junior in 2004 and then started only one full season at quarterback for Katy High as a senior in 2005. That year, he led the Tigers to the state finals, where they lost to Southlake Carroll, 34–20. As a senior, he threw for 2,877 yards with 42 touchdowns and 15 interceptions. That year, he was named the Greater Houston Area offensive player of the year by the Houston Chronicle.

== College career ==
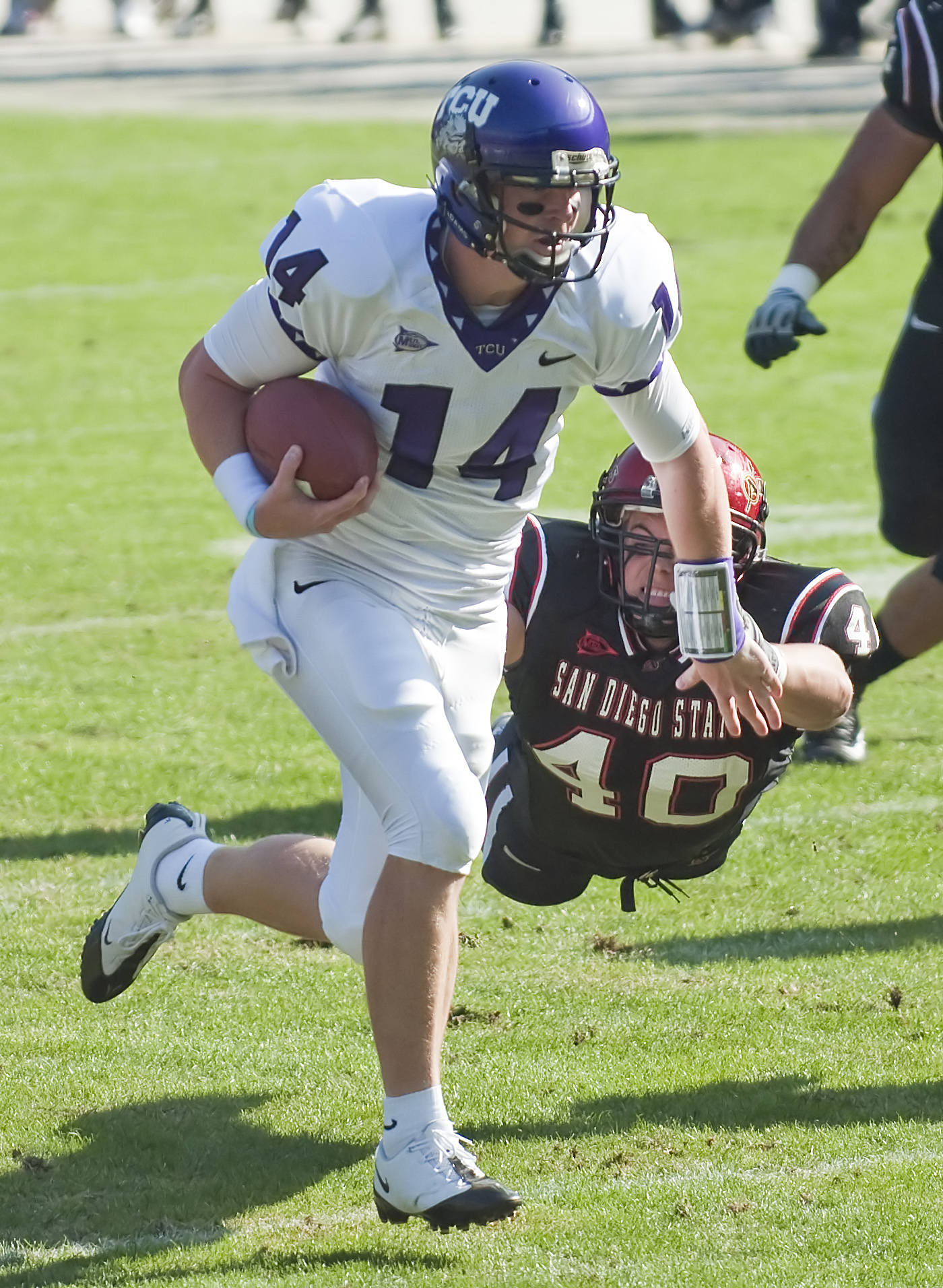
Dalton playing for TCU in 2009

Dalton committed to Texas Christian University on October 19, 2005.

=== 2006 and 2007 seasons ===
Dalton was redshirted his freshman year, but he traveled with the team to every road game and was listed as the Horned Frogs' third-string quarterback behind senior Jeff Ballard and redshirt freshman Marcus Jackson. Entering the 2007 season, Dalton was in competition with Jackson to be the starting quarterback. Two weeks before the season opener against the Baylor Bears, TCU head coach Gary Patterson named Dalton the starter. He was named the 2007 Texas Bowl MVP in TCU's 20–13 victory over the Houston Cougars. Dalton finished his redshirt freshman season with 2,459 passing yards, ten touchdowns, and 11 interceptions. After going 8–5 as a freshman, he accumulated a record of 34–3 as a starter for the rest of his career at TCU.

=== 2008 season ===
In the 2008 season, Dalton led TCU to an 11–2 record, finishing second place in the Mountain West Conference and seventh in the national AP Poll. He was named the 2008 Poinsettia Bowl MVP in the Horned Frogs' 17–16 win over the Boise State Broncos. He finished the 2008 season with 2,242 passing yards, 11 touchdowns, and five interceptions.

=== 2009 season ===
In the 2009 season, Dalton led the Horned Frogs to a perfect 12–0 regular season, a Mountain West Conference Championship, a #6 ranking in the AP Poll, and a BCS berth. The Horned Frogs lost 17–10 in the Fiesta Bowl to the Boise State Broncos. He finished the 2009 season with 2,756 passing yards, 23 touchdowns, and eight interceptions.

=== 2010 season ===
On September 4, 2010, Dalton recorded his 30th victory as the Horned Frogs starting quarterback, passing Sammy Baugh as TCU's all-time wins leader. Against the Baylor Bears, Dalton completed 21 of 23 pass attempts (a career-best and single-game record 91.3%) for 267 yards and two touchdowns. His team won a second consecutive Mountain West Conference Championship. On January 1, 2011, Dalton led his team to a 21–19 victory over the #4 Wisconsin Badgers in the Rose Bowl in Pasadena, California. His TCU football team finished the season with a perfect 13–0 record and #2 ranking in the AP Poll. The only other team with a perfect record, the Auburn Tigers, won the BCS National Championship that year. Dalton finished the 2010 season with 2,857 passing yards, 27 touchdowns, and six interceptions. He finished in ninth place on the Heisman Trophy voting.

Dalton held school career records for wins (42), passing yards (10,314), pass attempts (1,317), completions (812), and completion percentage (61.6) at the time he graduated, but a few years later, Trevone Boykin surpassed most of Dalton's records. Dalton also held the Mountain West career leader in total offense (11,925 yards) and plays from scrimmage (1,730).

== Professional career ==
Pre-draft measurables
Height	Weight	Arm length	Hand span	Wingspan	40-yard dash	10-yard split	20-yard split	20-yard shuttle	Three-cone drill	Vertical jump	Broad jump	Wonderlic
6 ft 2 in (1.88 m)	215 lb (98 kg)	31 3/4 in (0.81 m)	9 1/2 in (0.24 m)	6 ft 3 in (1.91 m)	4.93 s	1.77 s	2.89 s	4.27 s	6.93 s	29.5 in (0.75 m)	8 ft 10 in (2.69 m)	29
All values from NFL Combine

=== Cincinnati Bengals ===
==== 2011 season ====
On April 29, 2011, the Cincinnati Bengals selected Dalton in the second round, as the 35th overall pick, in the 2011 NFL draft. Out of the twelve quarterbacks that were chosen in the 2011 NFL Draft, he was the fifth selected.

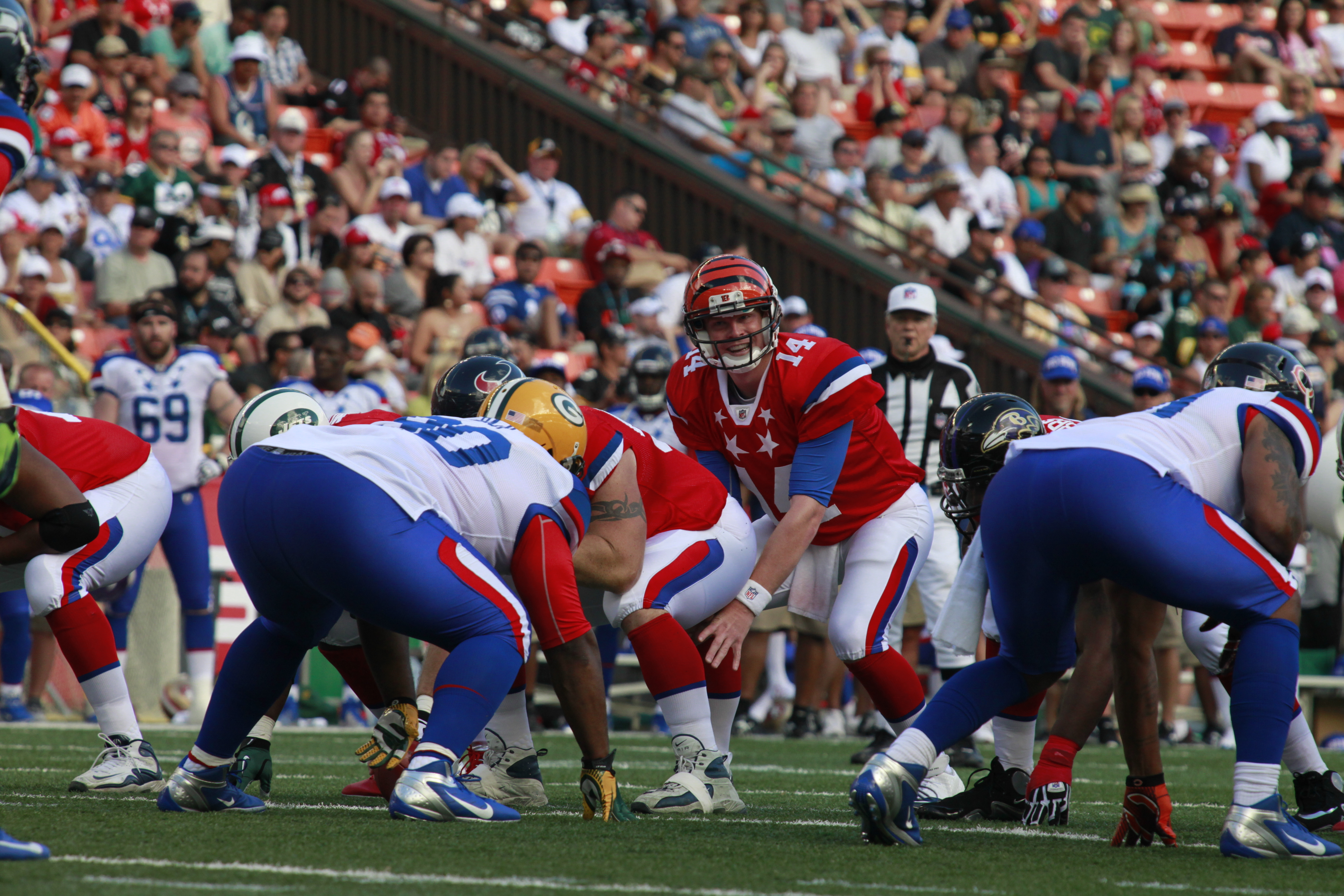
Dalton at the 2012 Pro Bowl

After Dalton was selected by the Bengals, there was much speculation over whether Dalton or veteran Bruce Gradkowski would start at quarterback. Carson Palmer, the first overall draft pick in the 2003 NFL draft, demanded to be traded or released and was traded later in the season to the Oakland Raiders. On June 29, 2011, the Bengals signed Dalton to a four-year, $5.21 million rookie contract with a $2.29 million signing bonus and $4.02 million guaranteed.

On August 8, before their first pre-season game against the Detroit Lions, Bengals head coach Marvin Lewis released his first depth chart per NFL rules but noted that it meant little. The depth chart had Dalton listed as the first-string quarterback, followed by Gradkowski.

Dalton's first NFL regular-season start came on September 11, on the road against the Cleveland Browns. Dalton, in one half of play before leaving the game due to injury, completed 10 of his 15 pass attempts for 81 yards and a touchdown, posting a passer rating of 102.4. The Bengals won the game, 27–17, Dalton's first divisional AFC North victory as well as first win against the divisional rival Browns. Dalton's second game on was also on the road, against the Denver Broncos. Despite a 24–22 loss, he led a comeback, completing 19 of 29 pass attempts for 280 yards and two touchdowns in the second half alone, and achieving a passer rating of 107.0 for the game. During a Week 6 27–17 victory over the Indianapolis Colts, Dalton completed 25 of 32 passes for 264 yards and a touchdown. In that game, he had a season-high 78.1 completion percentage and 111.5 passer rating.

On November 3, Dalton was named the NFL Offensive Rookie of the Month for October. He led the Bengals to a 4–0 record with 909 passing yards and six touchdowns in the month. During Week 9, Dalton then threw for 217 yards and a season-high three touchdowns with no interceptions against the Tennessee Titans in a comeback 24–17 victory, earning him NFL Rookie of the Week honors. Three weeks later, Dalton passed for 270 yards and a touchdown for a 105.6 passer rating in a comeback 23–20 victory over the Browns, again winning Rookie of the Week. This game featured a 51-yard strike from Dalton to A. J. Green with only 1:08 remaining in the fourth quarter, setting up the Bengals' game-winning field goal. By the end of the season, Dalton had led the Bengals to a 9–7 record and a berth in the NFL playoffs.

On January 7, 2012, the Bengals faced the T. J. Yates-led Houston Texans in the Wild Card Round of the NFL playoffs. This game marked the first time in NFL playoff history that two rookie quarterbacks started in the same game against each other. Dalton completed over 64 percent of his passes but also had three turnovers as the Texans won the game, 31–10.

During his rookie season, Dalton had four wins featuring fourth-quarter comebacks (against the Buffalo Bills, Jacksonville Jaguars, Tennessee Titans and Cleveland Browns). He became the first quarterback in NFL history not drafted in the first round to start all 16 games of his rookie season. Dalton became just one of five rookie quarterbacks with over 3,000 passing yards and at least 20 touchdown passes, joining fellow rookie Cam Newton and also Peyton Manning, Dan Marino, and Charlie Conerly.

At the end of the season, Dalton received the Emerging Player Award from the NFL Players Association during the NFLPA PULSE Awards. The other nominees for the award were Carolina Panthers quarterback Cam Newton, New Orleans Saints tight end Jimmy Graham, New England Patriots tight end Rob Gronkowski, and Lions defensive tackle Ndamukong Suh.

Dalton was named initially as a Pro Bowl Alternate in his first year, and was added to the American Football Conference (AFC) Pro Bowl roster after the Patriots won the AFC Championship, forcing Tom Brady to withdraw. Dalton and Newton became the first pair of rookie quarterbacks to make the Pro Bowl in the same season.

==== 2012 season ====
During Week 2, Dalton guided the Bengals to a 34–27 victory over the Cleveland Browns. He completed 24 of 31 passes for 318 yards, three touchdowns, and an interception, for a 128.2 passer rating. In the next game against the Washington Redskins, Dalton completed 19-of-27 passes for 328 yards, three touchdowns, and an interception, for a season-high 132.9 passer rating, in leading the Bengals to a 38–31 road victory. Furthermore, he lined up as a wide receiver on the first play from scrimmage of the game, acting as a decoy while wildcat quarterback Mohamed Sanu threw a 73-yard touchdown pass to A. J. Green, then again flanked as a receiver while BenJarvus Green-Ellis rushed for a touchdown via a direct snap. The following week against the Jacksonville Jaguars, Dalton threw for 244 yards and had three touchdowns (two passing, one rushing) in leading the Bengals to a 27–10 road victory.

On October 14, 2012, Dalton threw for a career-high 381 yards to go with three touchdowns against the Browns, but also threw three interceptions as the Bengals lost 34–24. This was the second game in what would become a four-game losing streak. Dalton and the Bengals rebounded by defeating the New York Giants by a score of 31–13. He completed 21 of 30 passes for 199 yards and a season-high four touchdowns, attaining a 127.6 passer rating and a season-high 94.5 QBR. For his performance against the Giants, Dalton was named the AFC Offensive Player of the Week for the first time in his career. In the next game against the Kansas City Chiefs, Dalton completed 18 of 29 passes for 230 yards and two touchdowns thrown (a 109.8 passer rating) while adding a rushing touchdown in the 28–6 road victory.

On November 25, in a much-hyped game with the Oakland Raiders due to the return of former Bengals quarterback Carson Palmer to Cincinnati, Dalton outperformed Palmer by throwing for 210 yards and three touchdowns, achieving a 109.0 passer rating, and leading the Bengals to a 34–10 victory. In the fourth quarter, an unnecessary roughness penalty by Lamarr Houston on Dalton was one part of a sequence of events leading to the ejections of Andrew Whitworth, Tommy Kelly, and Houston from the game. With his performance, Dalton became one of three players in NFL history with at least 20 touchdown passes in each of his first two seasons, joining Peyton Manning and Dan Marino.

In two of the next three following weeks, Dalton's mobility proved to be valuable as he scrambled for the go-ahead touchdown runs in victories over the San Diego Chargers and Philadelphia Eagles. On December 23, against the Pittsburgh Steelers, his 21-yard pass to Green with fourteen seconds remaining set up the game-winning field goal, propelling the Bengals to a 13–10 road victory and a second consecutive berth in the NFL playoffs. This game marked the first time Dalton was able to defeat the divisional rival Steelers, and the first time the Bengals made the playoffs in consecutive seasons since 1981–1982. The following week, Dalton threw for a touchdown and a 101.5 quarterback rating in one half of play in a 23–17 victory over the Baltimore Ravens. This marked his first victory over the divisional rival Ravens and capped a 10–6 regular-season record.

On January 5, 2013, Dalton and the Bengals faced the Houston Texans in the Wild Card Round of the NFL playoffs. In a defensive struggle with neither Dalton nor Texans quarterback Matt Schaub able to pass for a touchdown, the Bengals lost 19–13, the second consecutive year the Bengals fell to the Texans in the opening round of the playoffs. With 2:57 remaining in the fourth quarter, Dalton overthrew a pass to an open Green, for what would have been the go-ahead touchdown.

==== 2013 season ====
In the season opener against the Chicago Bears, Dalton completed 26 of 33 passes for a career-high 78.8 completion percentage, 282 yards, two touchdowns, two interceptions, and a 91.8 QBR as the Bengals lost on the road by a score of 24–21. In the next game, he threw for 280 yards and a touchdown as the Bengals beat the Pittsburgh Steelers by a score of 20–10. The following week, Dalton completed 20 of 28 passes for 235 yards, two touchdowns, and an interception for a 105.5 passer rating in leading the Bengals to a 34–30 victory over the Green Bay Packers.

On October 13, 2013, after two games without a touchdown pass (in a loss to the Cleveland Browns and a victory over the New England Patriots), Dalton rebounded by completing 26 of 40 passes for 337 yards, three touchdowns, and an interception for a 105.9 passer rating in a 27–24 overtime road victory over the Buffalo Bills. For his efforts in that game, Dalton was named the AFC Offensive Player of the Week. In the next game, he completed 24 of 34 passes for 372 yards and three touchdowns for a 92.8 QBR and a 135.9 passer rating in leading the Bengals to a 27–24 road victory over the Detroit Lions. The following week, Dalton completed 19 of 30 passes for 325 yards, a career-high five touchdowns, and an interception in merely three quarters of play for a 125.7 passer rating and a career-high 98.9 QBR in a 49–9 victory over the New York Jets. At the end of October, Dalton was named AFC Offensive Player of the Month.

On October 31, 2013, Dalton began another difficult two-game stretch. He passed for 338 yards against the Miami Dolphins but also had three interceptions, most critically one that bounced off the hands of Mohamed Sanu, that if caught by Sanu, likely would have sealed a victory for the Bengals, who ended up losing on the road by a score of 22–20 in overtime; Dalton was sacked by Cameron Wake in the end zone in overtime for a safety to end the game. In the next game against the Baltimore Ravens, Dalton passed for 274 yards and two touchdowns, most notably a 51-yard Hail Mary touchdown pass against the wind to A. J. Green as time expired in regulation but also had three interceptions as the Bengals lost on the road in overtime by a score of 20–17. Dalton continued his struggles against the Browns, as he threw two interceptions in the first quarter. However, he rebounded to throw three consecutive touchdowns as the Bengals won by a score of 41–20. After an early interception at the San Diego Chargers, Dalton again rebounded by passing for 149 yards and a touchdown in the second half as the Bengals won on the road by a score of 17–10.

On December 8, 2013, Dalton continued his upswing. He completed 24 of 35 passes for 275 yards and four total touchdowns against the Indianapolis Colts, attaining an 89.2 QBR and 120.5 passer rating in a 42–28 victory. Although the Bengals lost at the Steelers the following week, Dalton was able to pass for 230 yards and two touchdowns while overcoming six dropped passes by his receivers. For the second time in the 2013 season, he earned AFC Offensive Player of the Week honors. Dalton continued his December success the following week by completing 27 of 38 passes for 366 yards and four touchdowns for a 92.0 QBR and a career-high 136.5 passer rating in a 42–14 victory over the Minnesota Vikings. With this game, Dalton and the Bengals became the 2013 AFC North Division Champions and Dalton had earned his third consecutive berth to the NFL playoffs, becoming just one of five NFL quarterbacks to make the playoffs in each of his first three seasons. While the Bengals beat the Ravens 34–17 the following week, Dalton struggled, scoring three total touchdowns and passing for 281 yards but also four interceptions.

Dalton finished the regular season with 4,293 passing yards for 34 passing touchdowns, 20 interceptions, and an 88.8 passer rating. His passing yards and touchdowns were both career highs and Bengals single-season franchise records. In the Bengals' Wild Card game against the Chargers, Dalton threw his first NFL postseason touchdown pass. However, he also threw two interceptions and lost a fumble, on three consecutive possessions in the second half, as the Bengals lost by a score of 27–10. After the game, Dalton was heavily criticized for his poor play and consistent failure to advance in the playoffs. In his eight 2013 primetime (SNF, MNF, TNF, playoffs), and/or AFC North intradivisional games, Dalton completed 192 of 349 passes (55.0 completion percentage) for 2,036 passing yards, 5.83 yards per attempt, 11 passing touchdowns, 16 interceptions, and a 63.6 passer rating. In his other nine games of 2013, Dalton completed 200 of 288 passes (69.4 completion percentage) for 2,594 passing yards, 9.01 yards per attempt, 23 passing touchdowns, seven interceptions, and a 114 passer rating. Such performances raised doubt about whether Dalton was a "big-game" quarterback.

==== 2014 season ====
On August 4, 2014, Dalton received a six-year extension that could be worth as much as $115 million, with team performance-based incentives.

During the season-opening 23–16 victory over the Baltimore Ravens, Dalton threw the game-winning 77-yard touchdown pass to A. J. Green. It was Dalton's first win on the road against the Ravens. During a Week 3 33–7 victory over the Tennessee Titans, he caught an 18-yard touchdown pass from Mohamed Sanu. It was the first time a quarterback had caught a touchdown pass since quarterback Tyler Thigpen, then playing for the Kansas City Chiefs, caught a 37-yard pass from wide receiver Mark Bradley in 2008. Dalton was the first quarterback ever to catch a touchdown pass for the Bengals.

Following the Bengals' first loss of the 2014 season against the New England Patriots, the Bengals were involved in a tie for the second time in the past seven seasons. With the score tied at 37 in overtime against the Carolina Panthers, Dalton completed five of seven passes for 49 yards, but kicker Mike Nugent pushed the field goal wide right. Dalton threw for a season-high 323 yards, along with two touchdowns and two interceptions. This was followed by a meager 126 yards in a shutout road loss to the Indianapolis Colts. In the second match-up against the Ravens in Game 7, Dalton led an 80-yard drive in the games' final four minutes and ran in a quarterback sneak from one yard out to give the Bengals a 27–24 victory, his second game-winning drive of the season, both against Baltimore. Following a win over the Jacksonville Jaguars, the Bengals reached the season midpoint at 5–2–1.

Dalton had a historically terrible performance against the Cleveland Browns in Week 9, where he completed 10 of 33 passes for 86 total yards with three interceptions to earn a 2.0 passer rating, the lowest by an NFL quarterback with 25 pass attempts since 2004 and the 11th lowest in history. He responded with 220 yards and three touchdowns for a season-best rating of 143.9 in a 27–10 road victory over the New Orleans Saints, and his first career win in four attempts against the Texans in Week 11. During Week 12 against the Tampa Bay Buccaneers, Dalton rebounded from three first-half interceptions to run for a touchdown and throw for another in a 14–13 road victory. It marked the fourth consecutive year that Dalton had won three games against the National Football Conference, extending his record to 12–3–1 against the opposite conference. The Bengals lost in Week 13 to the Pittsburgh Steelers despite Dalton's solid 128.8 rating and 20-yard touchdown run (the longest ever by a Bengals quarterback), then shut out Cleveland despite his 53.6 rating. Two weeks later, Dalton threw two touchdowns and an interception in a 37–28 win over the Denver Broncos to help the Bengals clinch a playoff berth for a franchise-record fourth straight year. In the regular-season finale against the Steelers, Dalton threw two first-half interceptions but led an 89-yard fourth-quarter drive capped by a five-yard touchdown pass to Jermaine Gresham to cut the deficit to 20–17, but despite a streak of 11 of 12 passes for 101 yards, Green fumbled inside Steelers territory to seal the 27–17 loss and a #5 wild card seed in the playoffs.

Playing without many of his offensive weapons against the Colts on the road in the Wild Card Round, Dalton led the Bengals to their fourth straight playoff loss by a score of 26–10, with a 155-yard, no touchdown, no interception effort.

On January 20, 2015, it was announced that Dalton was selected to the 2015 Pro Bowl, his second Pro Bowl appearance, replacing Aaron Rodgers of the Green Bay Packers, who declined to participate due to injury. Dalton completed nine of 20 passes for 69 yards.

==== 2015 season ====
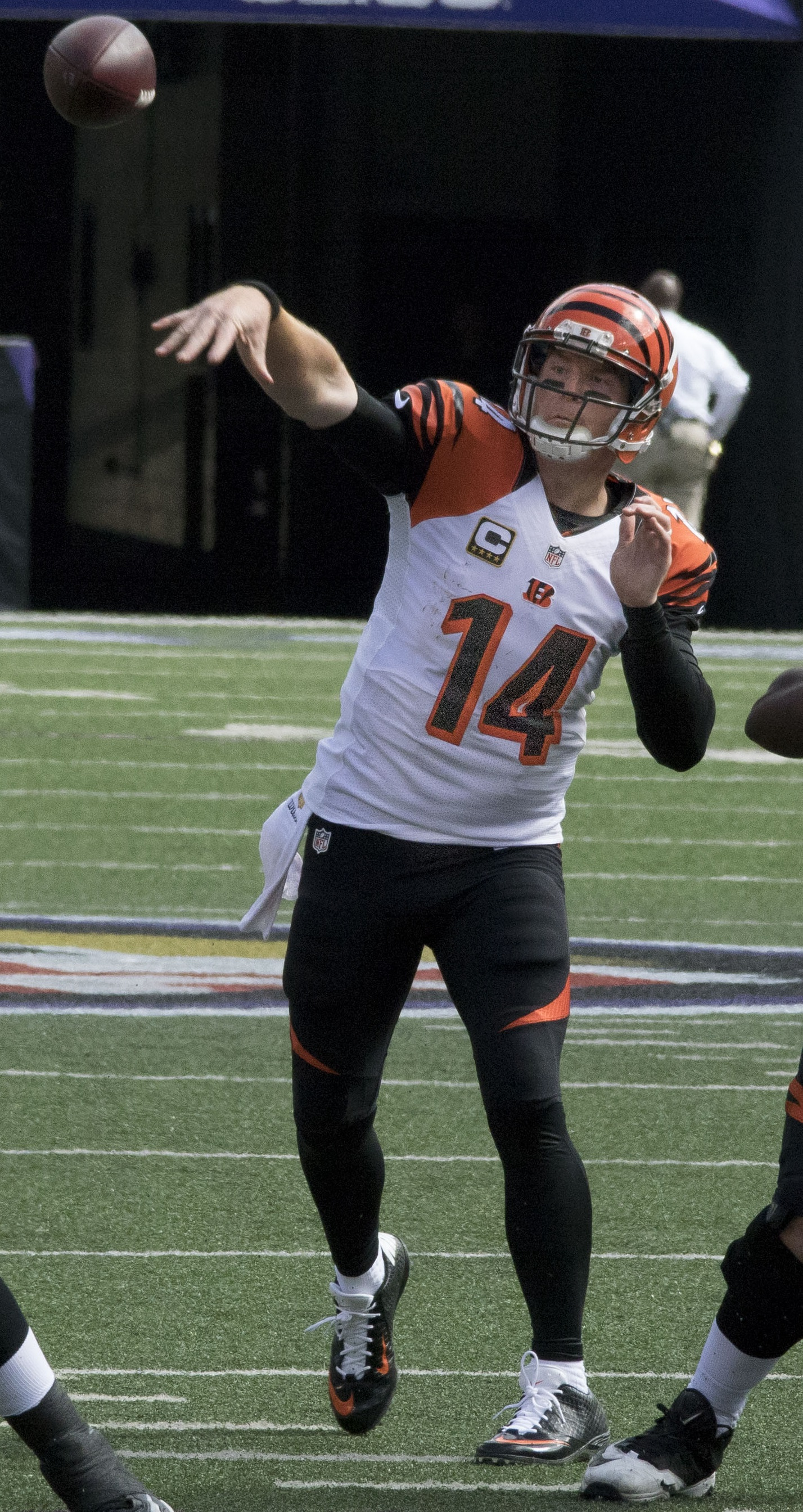
Dalton in Baltimore in 2015

The Bengals began the 2015 season on a historic winning streak. In the season-opening 33–13 road victory over the Oakland Raiders, Dalton threw his 100th career touchdown pass, which was to tight end Tyler Eifert, in the second quarter. Dalton finished the game with 269 passing yards and two touchdowns. In the next game, Dalton threw for 214 yards and three touchdowns in a 24–19 defeat of the San Diego Chargers. It marked the fourth straight home-opening win for the Bengals and the 15th three-touchdown performance for Dalton. He threw for a career-high 383 yards and three touchdowns in Week 3 against the Ravens, 321 yards in Week 4 against the Kansas City Chiefs, and 331 yards in a Week 5 game where Dalton also threw two touchdowns and ran for one as he led the Bengals back from a fourth-quarter 24–7 deficit to a 27–24 overtime win over the Seattle Seahawks. This was the second-biggest comeback in franchise history. During a Week 6 34–21 road victory over the Buffalo Bills, Dalton completed 22 of 33 passes for 243 yards with three touchdowns. Dalton was named the AFC Offensive Player of the Month for October. Following a bye week, Dalton led the Bengals to another fourth-quarter comeback against the Pittsburgh Steelers on the road. The 16–10 win gave the Bengals their first 7–0 start in franchise history. They extended this to 8–0 with Dalton's 139.8 passer rating in a victory over the Cleveland Browns.

Dalton failed to reach 200 yards passing for the first time in a Week 9 10–6 loss to the Houston Texans. In the next game against Arizona Cardinals, he threw for 315 yards and led two scoring drives in less than four minutes in the late fourth quarter to tie the game, the Bengals lost on the road by a score of 34–31. Dalton bounced back with three touchdowns and a 121.4 rating in a Week 11 31–7 victory over the St. Louis Rams, and a career-high passer rating of 146.8 in a Week 12 37–3 road victory over the Browns. During Week 13, Dalton fractured the thumb on his throwing hand while tackling Stephon Tuitt after an intercepted shovel pass, missing the season's final three games (replacement A. J. McCarron was 2–1 with a 97.1 passer rating).

Dalton finished the year with 3,250 passing yards, 25 touchdowns, and seven interceptions. He was the first Bengal ever to throw for more than 20 touchdown passes with fewer than 10 interceptions in franchise history. Dalton's 106.2 passer rating ranked No. 2 and his 8.4 yards per attempt ranked No. 3 among NFL quarterbacks in 2015. He was ranked 35th by his fellow players on the NFL Top 100 Players of 2016.

The Bengals' season ended when they lost to the Steelers by a score of 18–16 in the AFC Wild Card Round. Dalton had the cast for his broken thumb removed five days before the game, but did not play.

==== 2016 season ====
Dalton began the 2016 season with back-to-back 366 yard games, overcoming seven sacks for a 55-yard game-winning drive in the 23–22 road victory over the New York Jets in Week 1, but losing on the road 24–16 in Week 2 to the Pittsburgh Steelers. After an off-night of 206 yards, zero touchdowns, and an interception in a 29–17 loss to the Denver Broncos, Dalton completed 69.5% of his passes for 1,127 yards, six touchdowns, and no interceptions in four straight 100+ passer rating games. Despite a middle-of-the-pack 89.7 rating through 13 games, Dalton had been sacked a league-leading 32 times and the Bengals were 3–7–1 and out of the playoffs. Dalton had 332 yards and a 130.0 passer rating in a Week 13 32–14 victory over the Philadelphia Eagles, but averaged just 208 yards over the season's last four games. The Bengals ended the season with a 6–9–1 record, with Dalton throwing a career-low 18 touchdowns, and second in the league with 41 sacks. However, he recorded over 4,000 passing yards for the second time in his career, had just eight interceptions on 563 attempts, and contributed four rushing touchdowns. Marvin Lewis praised it as "the best campaign of [Dalton's] career", and he earned his third Pro Bowl recognition, replacing the Super Bowl-bound Tom Brady.

==== 2017 season ====
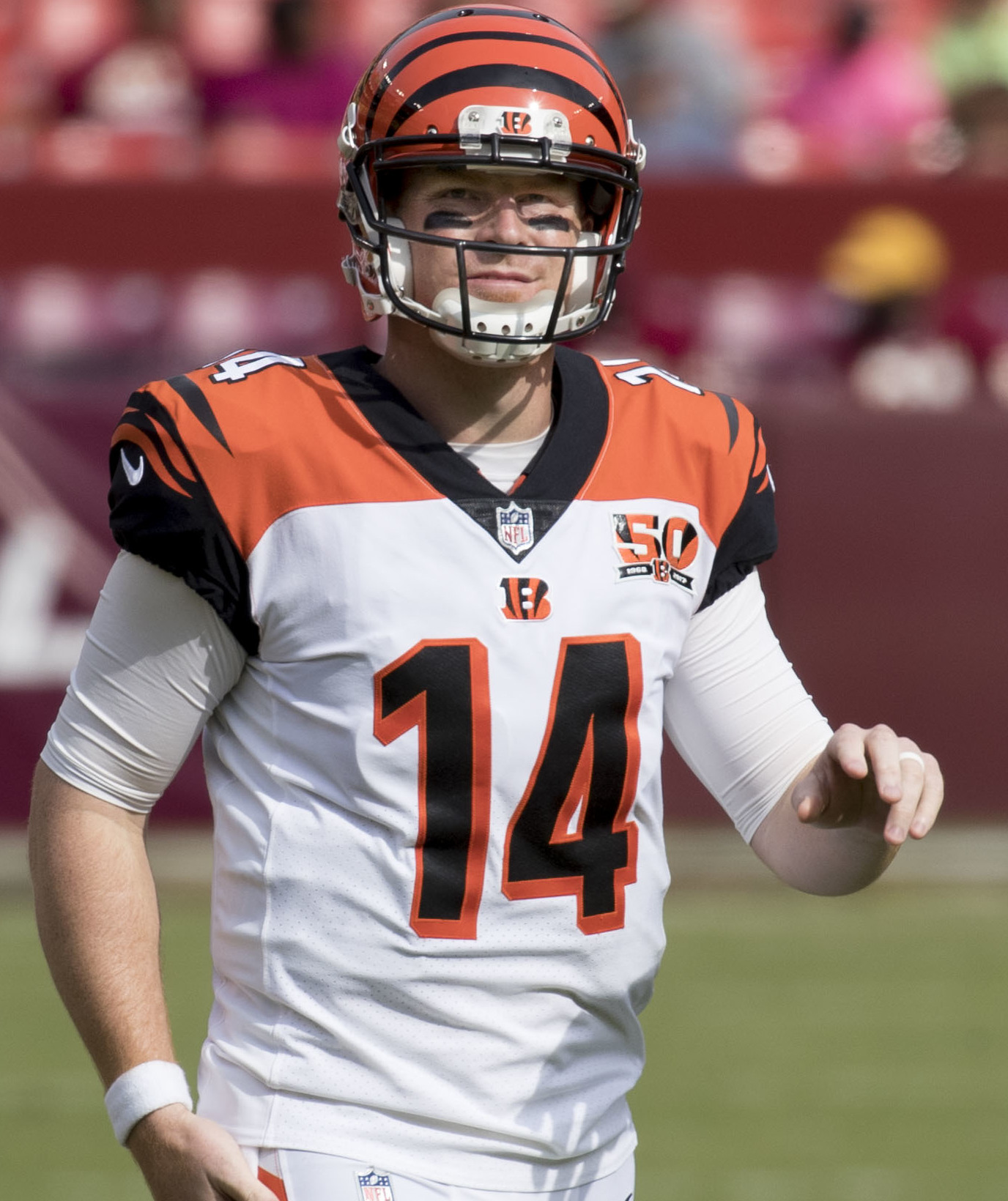
Dalton in Washington in 2017

Dalton threw three interceptions in the first half during the home opener against the Baltimore Ravens in Week 1. Overall, he finished the game with 170 passing yards and had four interceptions as the Bengals were shut out and lost by a score of 20–0. Dalton's four interceptions tied his career high for a single game, with the other instance occurring against the Ravens in a 2013 matchup. Though the Bengals were eliminated from playoff contention by the time of the rematch with Baltimore in Week 17, Dalton threw a game-winning touchdown pass to Tyler Boyd with 44 seconds left in the game, eliminating the Ravens from the postseason and allowing the Buffalo Bills to clinch their first playoff berth since 1999. Thanks to the Bengals' victory, thousands of grateful Bills fans donated money to Dalton's personal charity. Most of the donations were in $17 increments in honor of the Bills breaking their 17-year playoff drought. Over 11,000 people donated a combined over $250,000 to the Andy & Jordan Dalton Foundation, while Boyd's charity of choice, the Western Pennsylvania Youth Athletic Association, received $50,000 in donations from Bills fans. In the Bengals' 7–9 season, Dalton started all 16 games and finished with 3,320 passing yards, 25 touchdowns, and 12 interceptions.

==== 2018 season ====
During Week 2, Dalton threw four touchdown passes in the home-opener against the division rival Baltimore Ravens. All four touchdowns were in the first half, three of them were caught by A. J. Green. The Bengals went on to win 34–23. During Week 12 against the Cleveland Browns, Dalton suffered a thumb injury in the fourth quarter and did not return. It was revealed that he suffered torn ligaments in the thumb and was placed on injured reserve on November 26, 2018. In 11 games in the 2018 season, Dalton finished with 2,566 passing yards, 21 touchdowns, and 11 interceptions.

==== 2019 season ====
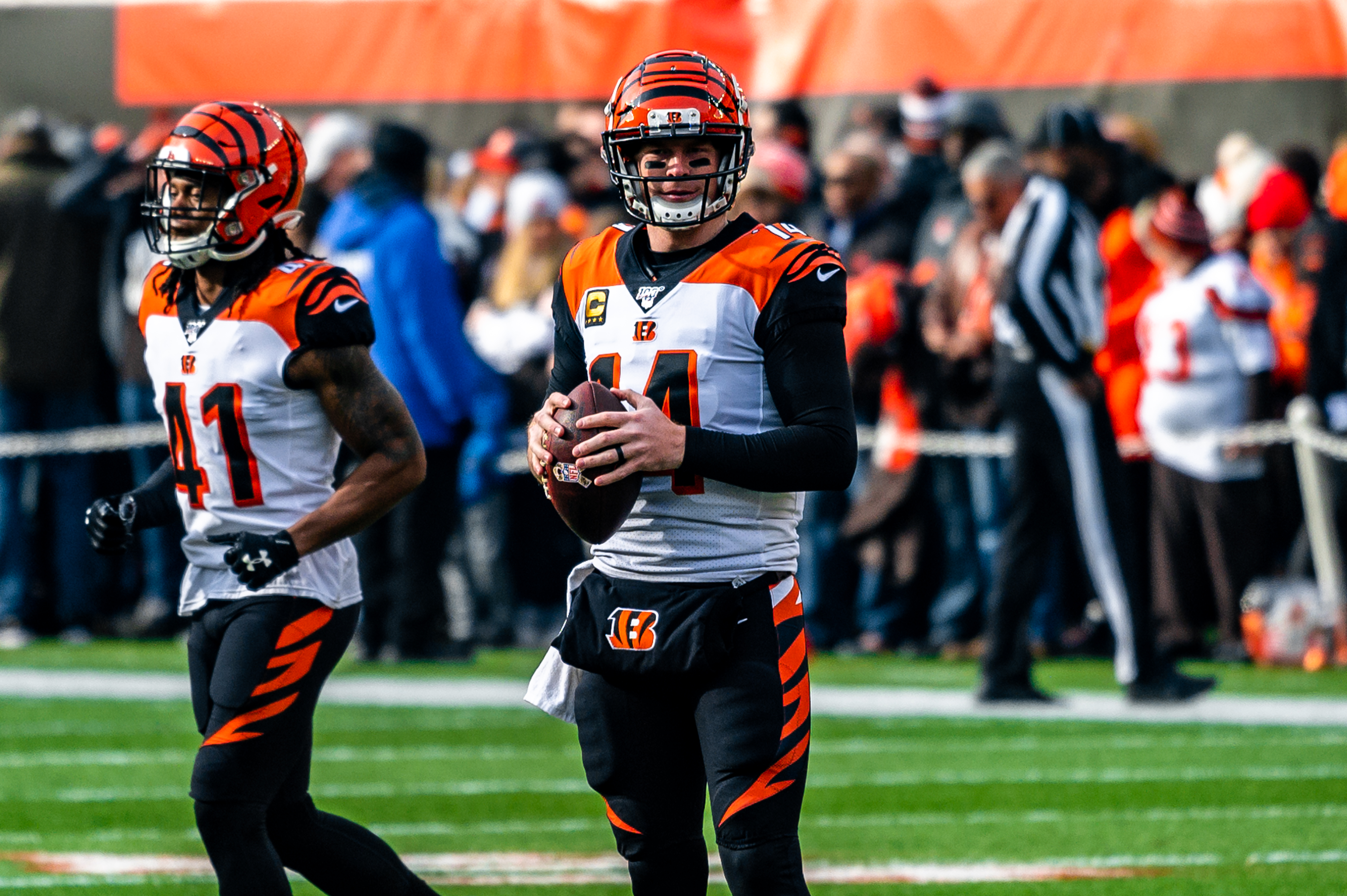
Dalton (right) in Cleveland in 2019

During Week 1 against the Seattle Seahawks, Dalton threw for a career-high 418 yards and two touchdowns in the 20–21 loss. Following an 0–8 start to the season, Bengals head coach Zac Taylor announced that he would bench Dalton and start rookie Ryan Finley. After three games and losses with Finley, Dalton was renamed the starting quarterback on November 25, 2019, for their upcoming game against the New York Jets. In the game, he threw for 243 yards and a touchdown as the Bengals won their first game of the season by a score of 22–6. In Week 15 against the New England Patriots, Dalton threw for 151 yards, a touchdown, and four interceptions during the 34–13 loss. This was Dalton's fourth career game with four interceptions. During a Week 16 road matchup against the Miami Dolphins, he threw for 396 yards and four touchdowns. Dalton scored 16 points in the final 29 seconds of regulation to force an overtime that the Bengals ultimately lost 38–35 to clinch the NFL's worst record. In the regular-season finale against the Cleveland Browns, Dalton threw for 190 yards, a touchdown, and an interception. In addition, he had eight carries for 10 yards and a touchdown during the 33–23 win. After the game, Dalton said that if it was his last game as a Bengal, "It was good to end it taking a knee." Dalton appeared in 13 games in the 2019 season and recorded 3,494 passing yards, 16 touchdowns, and 14 interceptions.

On April 30, 2020, after nine seasons with the franchise, the Bengals released Dalton after selecting Joe Burrow as the first overall pick in the 2020 NFL draft.

=== Dallas Cowboys ===
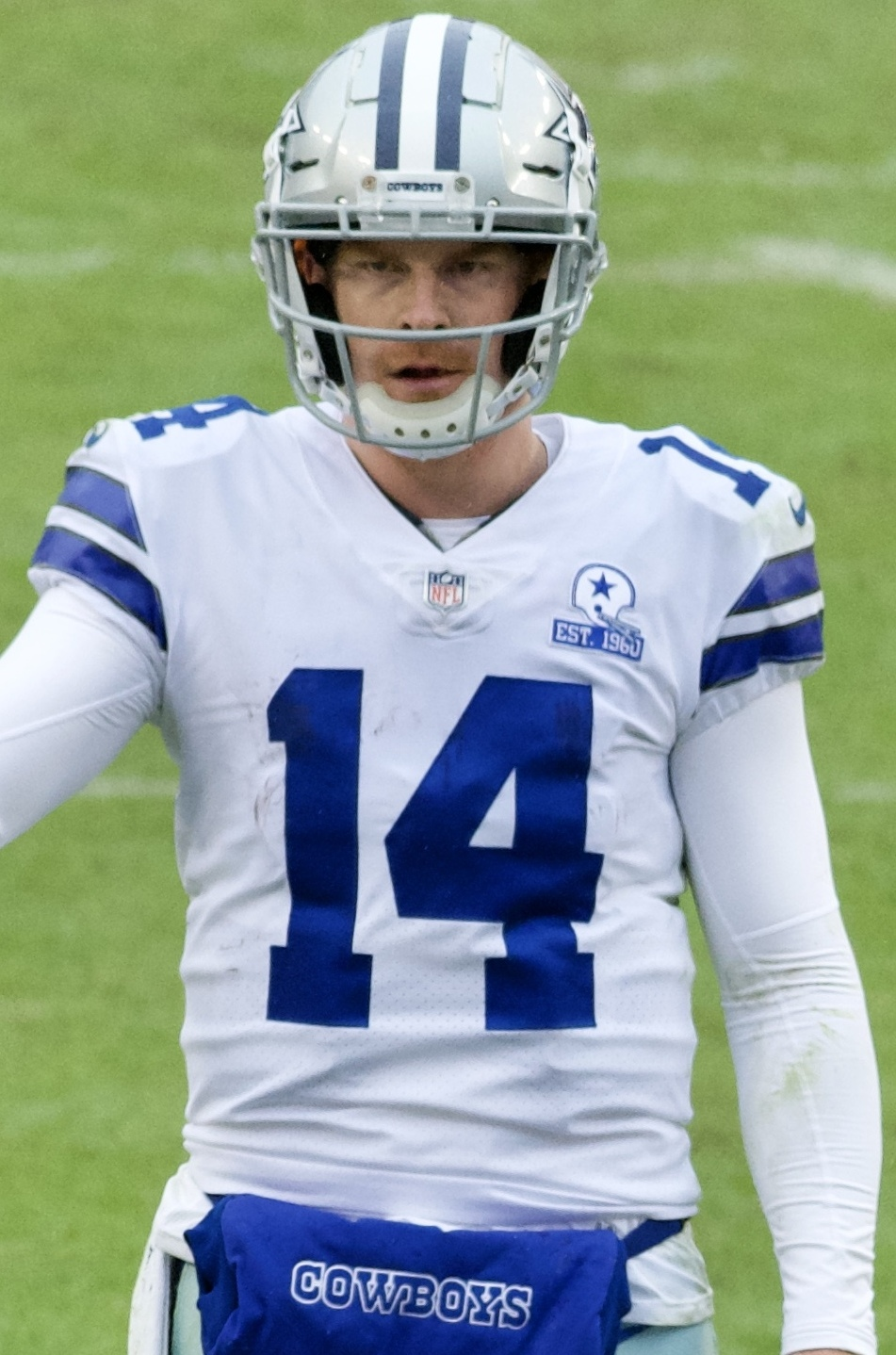
Dalton with the Dallas Cowboys in 2020

On May 2, 2020, Dalton signed a one-year contract with the Dallas Cowboys worth $7 million to be Dak Prescott's backup for the season.

On October 11, 2020, Dalton replaced an injured Prescott in Week 5 against the New York Giants. Dalton finished with 111 passing yards as the Cowboys won 37–34. Dalton was named the starting quarterback for the Cowboys going forward due to Prescott's season ending injury. Dalton made his first start in Week 6 against the Arizona Cardinals on Monday Night Football. During the game, Dalton threw for 266 yards, a touchdown, and two interceptions during the 38–10 loss.

During a Week 7 25–3 road loss to the Washington Football Team, Dalton suffered a concussion after a late hit by Jon Bostic. On November 3, 2020, Dalton was placed on the reserve/COVID-19 list after testing positive for the virus. Dalton was activated from the list on November 18, 2020, in time for the Cowboys' Week 11 matchup against the Vikings. Against the Minnesota Vikings, Dalton threw for 203 yards and three touchdowns, including one to Dalton Schultz with less than two minutes remaining in the fourth quarter, as the Cowboys beat the Vikings on the road by a score of 31–28.

During Week 14 against his former team, the Cincinnati Bengals, Dalton threw for 185 yards and two touchdowns during the 30–7 road victory. Two weeks later against the Philadelphia Eagles, Dalton threw for 377 yards, three touchdowns, and an interception during the 37–17 victory. In 11 games and 9 starts, Dalton finished the season with 2,169 yards, 14 passing touchdowns, and eight interceptions as the Cowboys finished with a 6–10 record.

=== Chicago Bears ===
On March 17, 2021, the Chicago Bears signed Dalton to a one-year contract worth $10 million, and up to $13 million in incentives. Dalton started the first two games before suffering a knee injury. He was then relegated to the backup quarterback after Justin Fields was named the starter. Against the Baltimore Ravens in Week 11, Dalton entered the game in the third quarter after Fields left the game with a rib injury. Dalton threw for 201 yards and two touchdowns as the Bears lost 13–16. In the 2021 season, Dalton passed for 1,512 yards, eight touchdowns, and nine interceptions in eight games.

=== New Orleans Saints ===
On March 29, 2022, Dalton signed a one-year contract with the New Orleans Saints. Dalton was named the starter in the Saints' Week 4 matchup against the Minnesota Vikings in London, following injuries to Jameis Winston. Dalton completed 20 of his 28 passes for 236 yards and a touchdown in the 28–25 loss. In Week 7 against the Arizona Cardinals, Dalton passed for 361 yards and four touchdowns but had three interceptions, including two pick-sixes, in the 42–34 loss. After the game, head coach Dennis Allen announced Dalton would be the starter for the remainder of the season over Winston. Dalton appeared in 14 games and finished with 2,871 passing yards, 18 touchdowns, and nine interceptions as the Saints went 7–10.

=== Carolina Panthers ===
==== 2023 season ====
On March 15, 2023, Dalton signed a two-year contract worth up to $10 million with the Carolina Panthers. Dalton was named the starter for the team during the offseason; however he was beaten out by Bryce Young, the first-overall draft pick, a few days before the preseason.

Dalton got his first start with the team on September 24, 2023, after Young went down with an injury a week prior. He went on to pass for 361 yards and two touchdowns in a 27–37 loss against the Seattle Seahawks. His 58 pass attempts were the most for any quarterback in a single game during the 2023 regular season. Week 3 was Dalton's lone significant playing time in the 2023 season.

==== 2024 season ====
On September 16, 2024, after the Panthers fell to 0–2 and Young continued to struggle, Dalton was named the starting quarterback. In his first start against the Las Vegas Raiders, Dalton threw for over 300 yards and three touchdowns, leading the Panthers to scores on seven of their 12 possessions as they won 36–22. On October 22, Dalton and his family were involved in a car accident. No one in the vehicle required emergency medical transport, but Dalton sustained an injury to the thumb on his throwing hand, ruling him out for the Panthers' Week 8 matchup against the Denver Broncos. Although Dalton recovered, Young remained the Panthers' starter for the rest of the season.

==== 2025 season ====
On February 18, 2025, Dalton signed another two-year contract extension with the Panthers, making it his third season with the team. His contract was worth $8 million and has a maximum value of $10 million. During the Panthers week 2 preseason game against the Houston Texans, Dalton would leave late in the first quarter early due to an elbow injury sustained when he was hit by Texans linebacker Danielle Hunter. Dalton appeared in four games in the 2025 season, passing for 293 yards, 1 TD and 1 INT. He made one start, which came in a Week 8 loss against the Buffalo Bills.

=== Philadelphia Eagles ===
On March 24, 2026, Dalton was traded to the Philadelphia Eagles in exchange for a 2027 seventh-round pick.

After competing with Tanner McKee for the role, Dalton was named the backup quarterback to Jalen Hurts. He briefly entered the Eagles' Week 3 matchup against the Bears while Hurts was being evaluated for a concussion, but his lone pass attempt was intercepted in the end zone by Dillon Thieneman.

On October 9, 2026, Dalton was released by the Eagles.

=== Atlanta Falcons ===
On October 19, 2026, Dalton signed with the Atlanta Falcons. He was assigned jersey number 13, which was last used by the Falcons' previous backup Cooper Rush before his release in favor of Dalton; it was the first time in Dalton's football career since high school that he did not wear No. 14 since it was given to receiver Olamide Zaccheaus.

== Career statistics ==
Legend
**Bold**	Career high

=== NFL ===
==== Regular season ====
Year	Team	Games			Passing									Rushing					Sacks		Fumbles	
Year	Team	GP	GS	Record	Cmp	Att	Pct	Yds	Avg	Lng	TD	Int	Rtg	Att	Yds	Avg	Lng	TD	Sck	SckY	Fum	Lost
2011	CIN	16	16	9–7	300	516	58.1	3,398	6.6	84	20	13	80.4	37	152	4.1	17	1	24	160	4	2
2012	CIN	16	16	10–6	329	528	62.3	3,669	6.9	59	27	16	87.4	47	120	2.6	17	**4**	**46**	229	4	**4**
2013	CIN	16	16	**11–5**	363	**586**	61.9	**4,293**	7.3	82	**33**	**20**	88.8	**61**	183	3.0	12	2	29	182	4	3
2014	CIN	16	16	10–5–1	309	481	64.2	3,398	7.1	81	19	17	83.5	60	169	2.8	20	**4**	21	124	3	2
2015	CIN	13	13	10–3	255	386	66.1	3,250	**8.4**	80	25	7	**106.2**	57	142	2.5	12	3	20	118	5	2
2016	CIN	16	16	6–9–1	**364**	563	64.7	4,206	7.5	**86**	18	8	91.8	46	**184**	4.0	15	**4**	41	**264**	**9**	3
2017	CIN	16	16	7–9	297	496	59.9	3,320	6.7	77	25	12	86.6	38	99	2.6	**25**	0	39	255	4	**4**
2018	CIN	11	11	5–6	226	365	61.9	2,566	7.0	49	21	11	89.6	16	99	**6.2**	21	0	21	157	1	0
2019	CIN	13	13	2–11	314	528	59.5	3,494	6.6	66	16	14	78.3	32	73	2.3	17	**4**	37	249	8	**4**
2020	DAL	11	9	4–5	216	333	64.9	2,170	6.5	69	14	8	87.3	28	114	4.1	13	0	24	184	2	1
2021	CHI	8	6	3–3	149	236	63.1	1,515	6.4	60	8	9	76.9	16	76	4.8	14	0	18	143	1	1
2022	NO	14	14	6–8	252	378	66.7	2,871	7.6	64	18	9	95.2	30	54	1.8	14	0	25	189	5	1
2023	CAR	3	1	0–1	34	58	58.6	361	6.2	47	2	0	88.4	3	12	4.0	10	0	3	27	0	0
2024	CAR	6	5	1–4	106	160	66.3	989	6.2	39	7	6	82.0	11	34	3.1	18	0	7	37	2	0
2025	CAR	4	1	0–1	25	37	**67.6**	293	7.9	33	1	1	89.1	5	-2	-0.4	1	0	8	54	2	2
2026	PHI	1	0	0–0	0	1	0.0	0	0.0	0	0	1	0.0	0	0	0.0	0	0	0	0	0	0
Career		180	169	84−83−2	3,539	5,652	62.6	39,793	7.0	86	254	152	87.5	487	1,509	3.1	25	22	363	2,372	54	29

==== Postseason ====
Year	Team	Games			Passing									Rushing					Sacks		Fumbles	
Year	Team	GP	GS	Record	Cmp	Att	Pct	Yds	Avg	Lng	TD	Int	Rtg	Att	Yds	Avg	Lng	TD	Sck	SckY	Fum	Lost
2011	CIN	1	1	0–1	27	42	**64.3**	257	6.1	36	0	**3**	51.4	3	17	5.7	15	0	**4**	**33**	1	0
2012	CIN	1	1	0–1	14	30	46.7	127	4.2	45	0	1	44.7	4	15	3.8	12	0	2	9	0	0
2013	CIN	1	1	0–1	**29**	**51**	56.9	**334**	**6.5**	**49**	**1**	2	**67.0**	**5**	26	5.2	12	0	3	8	**2**	**1**
2014	CIN	1	1	0–1	18	35	51.4	155	4.4	26	0	0	63.4	4	**34**	**8.5**	**16**	0	3	11	1	**1**
2015	CIN	0	0	Did not play due to injury																		
2025	CAR	0	0	Did not play																		
Career		4	4	0–4	88	158	55.7	873	5.5	49	1	6	57.8	16	92	5.8	16	0	12	61	4	2

=== College ===
Season	Team	Games			Passing								Rushing			
Season	Team	GP	GS	Record	Comp	Att	Pct	Yards	Avg	TD	Int	Rate	Att	Yards	Avg	TD
2006	TCU	Redshirt (redshirt)														
2007	TCU	13	13	8−5	**222**	**371**	59.8	2,459	5.8	10	**11**	118.5	98	232	2.4	5
2008	TCU	11	11	9−2	182	307	59.3	2,242	7.3	11	5	129.2	113	432	3.8	**8**
2009	TCU	13	13	12−1	199	323	61.6	2,756	8.8	23	8	151.8	**116**	**512**	4.4	3
2010	TCU	13	13	**13−0**	209	316	**66.1**	**2,857**	**9.9**	**27**	6	**166.5**	86	435	**5.1**	6
Career		50	50	42−8	812	1,317	61.7	10,314	7.8	71	30	140.7	413	1,611	3.9	22

== Career highlights ==
- 3× Pro Bowl (2011, 2014, 2016)
- Ranked No. 35 in the Top 100 Players of 2016
- 2× MW Offensive Player of the Year (2009, 2010)
- 2× First-team All-MW (2009, 2010)

Bengals franchise records

- Completions: playoff game (29 on January 5, 2014, against the Chargers), rookie season (300 in 2011)
- Pass attempts: playoff game (51 on January 5, 2014, against the Chargers), rookie season (516 in 2011)
- Passing yards: rookie season (3,398 in 2011)
- Passing TDs: rookie season (20 in 2011)
- Intercepted: playoffs (6), playoff season (3 in 2011), playoff game (3 on January 7, 2012, against the Texans)

== Personal life ==
Dalton is a Christian. On July 9, 2011, he married his longtime girlfriend, Jordan Jones, whom he met at TCU. In July 2014, Jones gave birth to the couple's first son. Their second son was born in March 2017. Their third child, a daughter, was born in January 2019.

Dalton and his wife founded the Andy & Jordan Dalton Foundation, which aims to help families and children in need. After Dalton helped the Cincinnati Bengals defeat the Baltimore Ravens 31–27 in Week 17 of the 2017 season, which allowed the Buffalo Bills to enter the playoffs, many Bills fans donated to his foundation in gratitude for helping their team snap their 17-year playoff drought. In less than a week, donations exceeded $360,000 from over 16,000 donors. Most donations were in the amount of $17, which symbolized the 17-year playoff drought that ended with the Bengals' victory over the Ravens. Dalton and his wife thanked Buffalo Bills fans by renting five billboards in the Buffalo area that read "Thank you, Buffalo, and good luck."

He has been nicknamed the "Red Rifle", a reference to both his throwing arm strength and his hair color.

== See also ==
- List of Division I FBS passing yardage leaders
- List of NFL career passing yards leaders
- List of NFL career passing touchdowns leaders
- List of NFL quarterback playoff records
