= A Madea Christmas (film) =

2013 film by Tyler Perry

- Theatrical release poster
- Directed by: Tyler Perry
- Written by: Tyler Perry
- Based on: A Madea Christmas by Tyler Perry
- Produced by: Tyler Perry; Ozzie Areu; Matt Moore
- Starring: Tyler Perry; Kathy Najimy; Chad Michael Murray; Anna Maria Horsford; Tika Sumpter; Eric Lively; JR Lemon; Alicia Witt; Lisa Whelchel; Larry the Cable Guy
- Cinematography: Alexander Gruszynski
- Edited by: Maysie Hoy
- Music by: Christopher Young
- Production company: Tyler Perry Studios
- Distributed by: Lionsgate
- Release date: December 13, 2013
- Running time: 100 minutes
- Country: United States
- Language: English
- Budget: $25 million
- Box office: $53.4 million

A Madea Christmas is a 2013 American Christmas comedy film directed, written, produced by and starring Tyler Perry with the rest of the cast consisting of Kathy Najimy, Chad Michael Murray, Anna Maria Horsford, Tika Sumpter, Eric Lively, JR Lemon, Alicia Witt, Lisa Whelchel, and Larry the Cable Guy. This is the first Christmas-themed film from the writer-director as it tells the story of Madea going to the fictional town of Bucktussle, Alabama, with her great-niece to spend Christmas with the great-niece's daughter as financial trouble involving a newly-constructed dam that threatens the town.

This is the seventeenth film by Perry, and the eighth film in the Madea film series.

The film was released on December 13, 2013, by Lionsgate. A Madea Christmas received negative reviews from critics and grossed $53.4 million worldwide.

== Plot ==
Mabel "Madea" Simmons has been talked into getting a job at a local store by her niece Eileen in Atlanta, but gets fired on her first day.

Eileen’s daughter Lacey, a teacher at a small school in Bucktussle, Alabama, is married to a white man named Conner whose plans to grow special corn earn the ire of corn farmer Tanner McCoy, his school bully. The school run by Principal Nancy Porter does not have enough money to fund the town's Christmas Jubilee, so Lacey asks her ex Oliver for funding through his business. She also tries to convince Tanner and Amber of their son Bailey's excellence in school, though Tanner refuses to listen. Due to this, Lacey is unable to visit Eileen for Christmas, but Oliver takes Madea and Eileen to see her. Eileen does not know Lacey is married to a white man and hopes she and Oliver can still work as a couple.

Lacey takes Oliver to a town meeting while Madea looks after her class. A girl named Lucy steals Madea's purse; when Madea finds out, she loses her temper and ties her to a cross in the classroom. Meanwhile, Conner's parents Buddy and Kim visit for Christmas and are told to keep the marriage a secret. Eileen cuts down Kim's father's memory tree; though she did not realize the meaning, Eileen shows no remorse. She becomes convinced that Buddy and Kim are part of the Ku Klux Klan after seeing Buddy with a bedsheet over his head.

Lacey soon discovers that the sponsors, Sheldon Construction, are forcing them to make the Jubilee Holiday-themed rather than Christmas-themed, and that they were the ones to build a nearby dam, cutting off the town's water supply and putting their residents out of work. Infuriated by these facts, Tanner convinces the mayor to fire Lacey, much to Bailey and Nancy's dismay. At home, Lacey also reveals to Eileen that she is married to Conner, and Eileen's true feelings about whites are revealed; her husband left her for a white woman though she told Lacey he was killed by a white man while trying to protect her honor. Eileen storms out and waits for a taxi to pick her up.

Lacey admits to Conner that Tanner got her fired, setting Conner off. Walking to town, Eileen sees Tanner's overturned truck and saves his life. Conner punches Tanner and demands Eileen to get in his truck. Tanner visits Lacey's house with Amber, apologizes to Conner for everything, and thanks Eileen, who reluctantly accepts Lacey and Conner's marriage thanks to Madea. Tanner agrees to listen to Conner about his corn and will ask the mayor to rehire Lacey.

At the event, Lacey thanks the sponsors and announces their promises to help the citizens which were not in the original contract, knowing the repercussions they would face if they backed out. She also tells Oliver she is married to Conner as the students led by Bailey start singing.

== Cast ==
- Tyler Perry as Mabel "Madea" Simmons
- Kathy Najimy as Kim Williams
- Chad Michael Murray as Tanner McCoy
- Anna Maria Horsford as Eileen Murphy
- Tika Sumpter as Lacey Williams (née Murphy)
- Eric Lively as Conner Williams
- JR Lemon as Oliver
- Alicia Witt as Amber McCoy
- Lisa Whelchel as Principal Nancy Porter
- Larry the Cable Guy as Buddy Williams
- Noah Urrea as Bailey McCoy
- Ashlee Heath as Audry
- Caroline Kennedy as Lucy
- Steve Boles as the unnamed Mayor of Bucktussle
- Sweet Brown as herself
- Antoine Dodson as himself
- Jonathan Chase as Alfred
- Vickie Eng as Customer
- Daniel Mann as Austin

== Soundtrack ==
The soundtrack for the film was released in stores by Motown Records November 25. This was the first soundtrack to a Tyler Perry film since 2010's For Colored Girls and the first Madea soundtrack since 2006's Madea's Family Reunion and 2008's Meet the Browns. It featured Smokey Robinson, Mariah Carey, Brian McKnight, James Brown, KEM, Boyz II Men, Kelly Rowland, Jeremih, Stevie Wonder, Jackson 5, Pearl Bailey, Ashanti, Kevin Ross & MPrynt.

== Reception ==
=== Critical response ===
On the review aggregator website Rotten Tomatoes, 21% of 33 critics' reviews are positive, with an average rating of 4,2/10. The website's consensus reads: "It boasts a few laughs, but overall, Tyler Perry's A Madea Christmas ranks among Perry's least entertaining or substantive works." Metacritic, which uses a weighted average, assigned the film a score of 28 out of 100, based on 20 critics, indicating "generally unfavorable" reviews. Audiences polled by CinemaScore gave the film an A− grade.

Owen Gleiberman of Entertainment Weekly gave the film a grade B− but said that it felt like reruns: "Tyler Perry's movies haven't gotten any worse, but they haven't gotten better either, so they now carry the added disadvantage of overfamiliarity." Variety called it "An exceptionally poor piece of holiday cash-in product, rushed and ungainly even by the low standard set by Perry's seven previous Madea films, yet it should be every bit as profitable." The Hollywood Reporter wrote: "Bah humbug to this latest screen outing for Tyler Perry's inexplicably popular character" and criticized the clunky narrative and the hackneyed dialogue.

== Accolades ==
Award	Category	Nominee(s)	Result
Golden Raspberry Awards	Worst Picture	Tyler Perry, Ozzie Areu, and Matt Moore	Nominated
Golden Raspberry Awards	Worst Director	Tyler Perry (also for Temptation: Confessions of a Marriage Counselor)	Nominated
Golden Raspberry Awards	Worst Actress	Tyler Perry	Won
Golden Raspberry Awards	Worst Supporting Actor	Larry the Cable Guy	Nominated
Golden Raspberry Awards	Worst Screenplay	Tyler Perry	Nominated
Golden Raspberry Awards	Worst Screen Combo	Tyler Perry and either Larry the Cable Guy or That worn-out wig and dress	Nominated

== Home media ==
A Madea Christmas was released on Blu-ray and DVD on November 25, 2014. The DVD contains a first look at the opening of the then-upcoming animated feature Madea's Tough Love.

== See also ==
- List of Christmas films
