= JR Lemon =

American model and actor (born 1983)

- Born: James Roch Lemon II; June 6, 1983 (age 43); Atlanta, Georgia, U.S.
- Occupation: Actor
- Years active: 2009–present

James Roch (born June 6, 1983) is an American model and actor. After playing football for Stanford University and the Oakland Raiders, Roch began appearing in national commercial and print ad campaigns before getting into acting full-time. He is best known for the role of Nurse Kenny Fournette on the NBC drama The Night Shift.

== Early life ==
Roch was born and raised in Atlanta, Georgia. After graduating high school, he attended Stanford University and played running back on the Stanford Cardinal football team while also earning a Bachelor of Science degree in Management Science & Engineering in 2005. He was signed as free agent with the Oakland Raiders, but was cut during 2006 training camp. After moving to the Los Angeles area to continue his football training, he went on to pursue modeling and acting.

== Career ==
Roch was an action-capture actor for the Madden NFL series of video games from 2009 through 2012. In 2017, Roch portrayed Devin Wade, the protagonist of Madden NFL 18's "Longshot" story mode. His first film role was as the main character Jenkins in the little-known stoner comedy Bad Batch. He next appeared in the 2012–13 Web series Shadow Love before getting his big break in 2013 when he was cast in his first major film role: playing Oliver in Tyler Perry’s A Madea Christmas. Most recently, he appeared as Nurse Kenny Fournette, a main character on the NBC medical drama The Night Shift, which ran for four seasons (2014–2017).

== Filmography ==
=== Film and television ===
Year	Title	Role	Notes
2012–2013	Shadow Love (as J.R. Lemon)	Amir	10 episodes
2013	A Madea Christmas	Oliver	film
2014	Hawaii Five-0	Jordan Lewis	Episode: " Ho’oilina "
2014–2017	The Night Shift	Nurse Kenny Fournette	Main cast, 45 episodes
2015	Whitney	Reporter	TV movie
2021	Black Lightning	Cousin Donald	Main cast, "Painkiller" (backdoor pilot)
2021	FBI	Terrance	Episode: "Know Thyself"
2022	Grey Elephant	Will	film
2023	Law & Order: Organized Crime	Deputy Inspector Ray Thurman	Recurring, 8 episodes
2026	P-Valley	Tremayne '2 Trill' Cage	Recurring, 3 episodes

=== Video games ===
Year	Title	Role	Notes
2017	Madden NFL 18	Devin Wade	Protagonist of Longshot
2018	Madden NFL 19	Devin Wade	Protagonist of Longshot: Homecoming
