= Pat Kirwan =

American football coach, scout, and executive

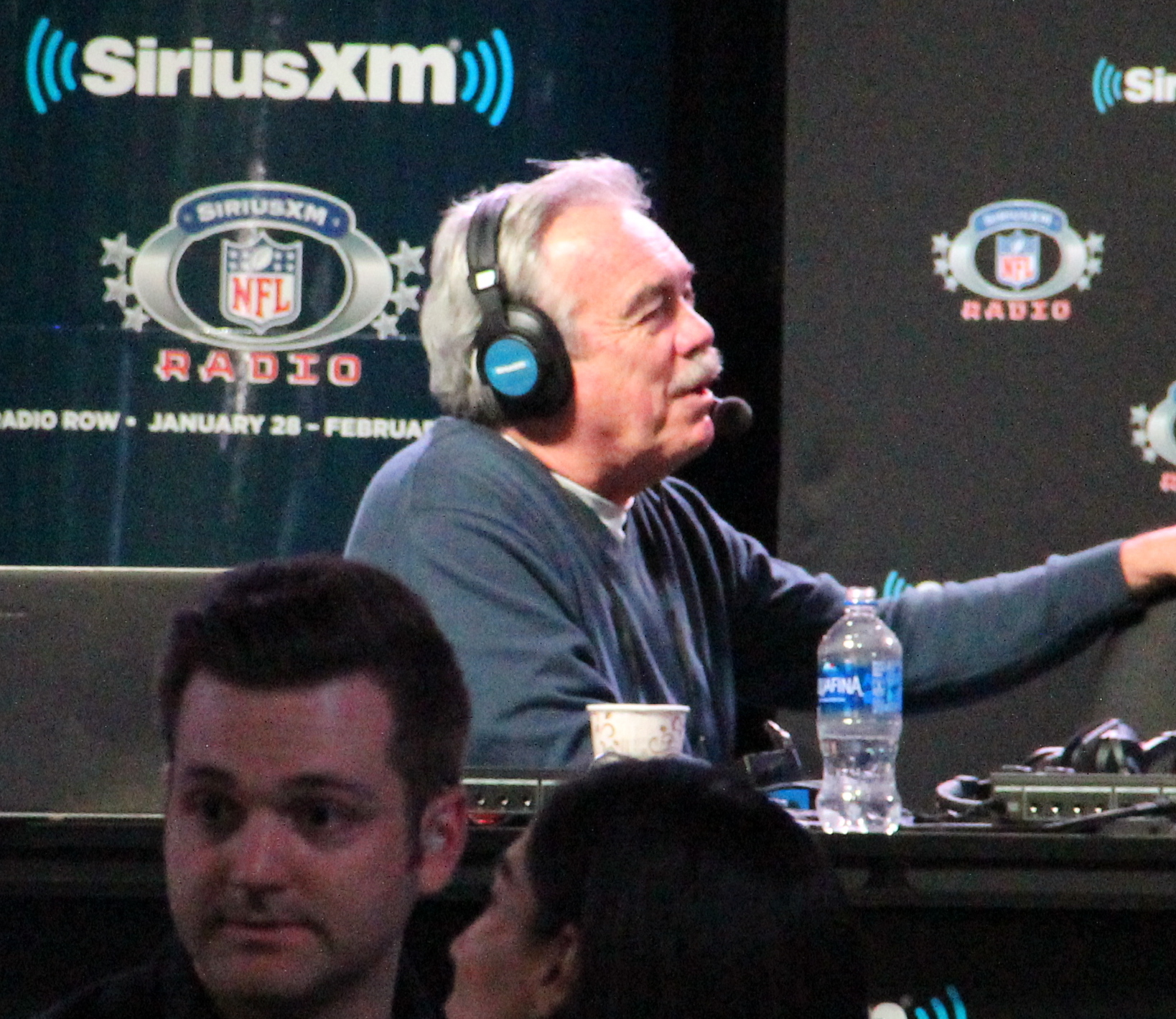
Kirwan in 2019

Pat Kirwan is a former American football coach. He began his NFL career in 1972 after coaching high school and college football.

He was an area scout for the Phoenix Cardinals (1989) and Tampa Bay Buccaneers (1983–86). He spent eight years (1989–97) with the New York Jets, beginning as a defensive assistant coach and advancing to director of player administration, where he negotiated contracts and managed the team's salary cap.

Kirwan, a graduate of St. Anthony's High School, was offensive coordinator for Hofstra University and head coach of Maria Regina High School.

Following his NFL career, he became a regular contributor to CNNSI and is an NFL.com senior analyst. He currently hosts on SiriusXM NFL Radio's Movin' the Chains and did so with Jim Miller until February 9th, 2026 - at which time Pat announced that Jim would no longer be part of the show. No additional details on why Jim would no longer be there were mentioned in the on-air announcement.

He is the author of Take Your Eye Off the Ball: How to Watch Football by Knowing Where to Look (2010), along with David Seigerman.

In the 2017 video game Madden NFL 18's story mode Longshot, Kirwan and Jim Miller co-host a fictional show called Real Football.
