= Madden NFL 18 =

2017 video game

- Xbox One "G.O.A.T. edition" cover art featuring Tom Brady
- Developer: EA Tiburon
- Publisher: EA Sports
- Series: Madden NFL
- Engine: Frostbite 3
- Platforms: PlayStation 4 Xbox One
- Release: August 22, 2017
- Genre: Sports
- Modes: Single-player, multiplayer

Madden NFL 18 is an American football sports video game based on the National Football League, developed and published by EA Sports for PlayStation 4 and Xbox One. The 28th installment of the Madden NFL series, the game features New England Patriots quarterback Tom Brady on the cover, the second straight year a Patriots player has had the distinction, following tight end Rob Gronkowski.

It was released worldwide on August 25, 2017, while those who pre-ordered the "G.O.A.T. Edition" were able to play it three days earlier and access their copy on August 22, 2017. It is the first game of the series since Madden NFL 06 not to be released on Xbox 360 and the first game since Madden NFL 07 not to be released on PlayStation 3, and also the first game in the main series to be available on only two platforms since Madden NFL '94.

== Gameplay ==
Madden NFL 18 is the first game in the series to use the Frostbite engine.

While the Madden series has typically featured a Superstar career mode, Madden NFL 18 introduces a story mode known as Longshot, the first such mode in the series. Longshot follows Devin Wade, a quarterback from Mathis, Texas, as he tries to reach the NFL, and includes high school and college football games (the first appearance of the latter in an EA Sports game since 2013, when EA ended the NCAA Football series), as well as the NFL Scouting Combine. The player's decisions and performances in the game determine Devin's career path, as dialog trees are used to help him make decisions.

Madden NFL 18 also included many subtle game-play changes. One of the major changes was a new element to the overall difficulty of a game, introducing "game styles". Game styles were an attempt to create a more enjoyable experience to the player, allowing them to choose (excluding Madden Ultimate Team solo challenges) one of three game styles to fit their enjoyment. The first game style was arcade mode, which was made for players who like an easy experience. Arcade mode made the game much easier for the user. The second game style was simulation mode. This game style was an attempt to make the game-play feel like an authentic NFL game. This brought the difficulty up from arcade mode but wasn't as intense as the third and final game style, competitive. This was created for the hard-core Madden players, making the AI incredibly skilled, and making game-play incredibly difficult.

More minor game-play changes included the addition of Target Passing, a new game-play element when attempting a pass. The goal of this new feature was to give the user more control over the game and have more confidence in the pass going where it was intended to go.

Other changes/additions included the creation of MUT Squads, and coaching adjustments in-game.

== Longshot plot ==
Quarterback Devin Wade, along with childhood friend and wide receiver Colton "Colt" Cruise, visits Indianapolis to participate in the NFL Regional Combine. There, Devin's performance catches the attention of TV producers Ross Fountain and Julia Vasco, who want him to be the star of a series titled Longshot, which would follow the story of a player with low odds of making it into the NFL and turn him into an NFL Draftee, receiving the assistance of coach Jack Ford, the host of the program. Devin and Colt leave without an answer to think. On the drive home, Devin reminisces about his successful high school career before his struggles at the University of Texas, which he left after just four games following his father's death in a car accident. To Devin, Colt, and Julia's surprise, Ross arranges for three other quarterbacks to compete with him on the show. Although Jack urges Ross to select another quarterback due to Devin's inability to call plays, Ross forces Jack to choose him for his better marketing potential and guilt trips him by mentioning Devin's deceased parents.

Annoyed by what he considers boring television, Ross arranges an exhibition game for Devin in front of NFL scouts, scheduled to take place in two weeks. Devin is worried about the game, but Colt, who has been invited to the NFL Super Regional Combine, decides to join the show and help him. At a press conference the day before the game, Devin's confidence is shattered by questions about where he had disappeared after his Texas career. Devin asks Ross to postpone the game, but he and Julia are fired. Jack attempts to persuade Devin to stay, but he and Colt drive home.

In Texas, Colt tells Devin he is tired of helping him only for him to quit whenever the situation proves to be too difficult, sparking an argument. Devin starts working at his friend's construction business, where his coworkers and former Mathis teammates remember their high school days. That night, Devin is still working against his friends' interests as a Mathis High School football ceremony is taking place. Colt arrives and makes amends with Devin. After the ceremony, Julia visits the two and convinces them to rejoin the show.

Returning to the Longshot studios, Devin reunites with Jack and apologizes for leaving, while Jack does so for failing to properly train him. At the meeting, the president of the TV network that Longshot is on declares Ross' onscreen behavior inappropriate and leaves his fate in the hands of the player. Following said meeting, Jack introduces Devin to his good friend, former Miami Dolphins great Dan Marino, who further coaches Devin. The two visit a military base in Dubai in the United Arab Emirates, where Devin was stationed after enlisting in the Army following his time at Texas. There, Captain McCarthy explains how he helped Devin rediscover his love for football.

For the Legends Game, Devin's team is to progress through five challenges, with the first three based on moving the offense downfield from certain starting yard lines in an allotted time frame. In the fourth, Devin has to complete a scoring drive without throwing a pass to Colt. For the final challenge, rain falls on the stadium as Devin faces a 3rd and 15 situation, an atmosphere resembling his final game at Texas. After scoring, Devin is greeted by the cheers of Longhorn fans, having finally redeemed himself.

Devin and Colt's NFL futures vary based on the player's behavior in the Legends Game. There are three possible endings related to the Draft: Devin gets drafted by his favorite team (which the player picked earlier in the game), Colt gets drafted by Devin's favorite team's rival and Devin is undrafted, or Colt and Devin are selected by the same team. In the first, Devin is selected in the seventh round while Colt is not drafted. Devin tries to encourage him, but Colt tells him to enjoy the feeling. Devin leaves the house and shouts in glee before stopping to remember his childhood.

In the undrafted ending, Colt is drafted in the sixth round but apologizes to Devin out of disbelief. As the seventh round concludes, Devin is not drafted and leaves the house, where he vents his frustration and sits on the porch. A flashback to his childhood days with his father takes place, where Cutter tells him while victory does not always occur, if one gives it their best, they have the right to feel like a winner. Shortly after, Marino calls Devin to announce two teams have expressed interest in signing him as an undrafted free agent: his favorite team and Colt's team. After telling Colt of his new team, the two celebrate.

The third ending can only be achieved if one plays out the story with the aim of improving Colt's draft stock as well as Devin's. It is similar to the undrafted ending, but instead of Colt being drafted by Devin's favorite team's rival, he is instead selected by Devin's favorite team outright. Devin leaves his house immediately after Colt is drafted, during which the flashback plays. Afterward, instead of Marino calling Devin, he is contacted by his favorite team's coach asking him if he'd like to join Colt. Devin accepts, and he and Colt celebrate.

Standing on his porch, Devin receives a text from Jack, who congratulates and thanks him for allowing him to be his coach. Devin returns to his room and looks at his Texas cap on the desk, telling his father he finally had something to be proud of before placing his NFL team's cap with it.

== Development ==
Like Madden NFL 17, EA did not hold an open vote for who would appear on the cover, but personally selected and announced New England Patriots quarterback Tom Brady in May 2017. EA Sports marketed the game with a trailer featuring Brady's entrance to Super Bowl LI. Madden NFL 18 was released on August 25, 2017 for the PlayStation 4 and Xbox One. It was first game in the series not to be released on Xbox 360 since Madden NFL 06 and the first not to be released on PlayStation 3 since Madden NFL 07. The soundtrack for the game, which features 40 songs, includes Stormzy, Kendrick Lamar, Big Sean, Imagine Dragons, Steve Aoki, Waka Flocka Flame, Pharrell Williams, Snoop Dogg, Young Jeezy, Rick Ross, Big Boi, Killer Mike, and ASAP Rocky among others. The original score of Madden NFL 13 composed by Colin O' Malley can also be played in the menus via the EA Trax option.

Written by EA Sports creative director Mike Young, Longshot is split into three acts, the first discussing the Regional Combine, while the second and third follow the Longshot TV show and Devin's return, respectively. While Longshot is comparable to story modes in other games like NBA 2K's MyCareer and FIFA's The Journey, Longshot is different in that the protagonist is not a rising star in their respective sport, but is instead a fringe player. Young described the story as like a "playable movie", rather than a "career mode with cutscenes".

To develop Longshot, EA Sports used motion capture on the actors. Devin is portrayed by JR Lemon, a former Stanford Cardinal football player and member of the Oakland Raiders, while Academy Award winner Mahershala Ali plays Devin's father Cutter. Colt is played by Scott Porter, a cast member in the TV series Friday Night Lights and ex-high school football player. Ross and Julia are portrayed by Ricky Wayne and Marem Hassler, respectively. Rus Blackwell plays Jack; Bill Cowher, who was originally considered for Jack's role, along with former players like Marino, Chad Johnson, and Larry English are also involved in the story. United States Army soldier and former Texas Longhorns long snapper Nate Boyer appears in the story as Captain McCarthy. Like Boyer, Devin is a Texas Longhorn and soldier, which Boyer pointed out was a coincidence; an ESPN documentary about the long snapper was also named The Long Shot. Unlike other characters, Jim Miller and Pat Kirwan appear in the game as live action analysts for the fictional Real Football show, as do players Kirk Cousins and Josh Norman in Twitter videos.

NHL player Theoren Fleury and Phil Deschambault wrote the song "Longshot" for the story. Colt also writes and performs the song in the game.

== Reception ==
Reception

Aggregate score
| Aggregator | Score |
|---|---|
| Metacritic | (XONE) 82/100 (PS4) 82/100 |

Review scores
| Publication | Score |
|---|---|
| Destructoid | 7/10 |
| Electronic Gaming Monthly | 7/10 |
| Game Informer | 8.25/10 |
| GameRevolution | 3/5 |
| GameSpot | 9/10 |
| GamesRadar+ | 3.5/5 |
| IGN | 8.6/10 |
| Polygon | 8/10 |

On Metacritic, Madden NFL 18 received "generally favorable" reviews from critics for both the Xbox One and PS4 versions despite also receiving "generally unfavorable" ratings from users.

The new game mode Longshot, however, was met with a mixed reception, with some calling it "game changing" and praising the story, while others referred to it as an "ambitious disappointment" and criticized the lack of actual football gameplay in the mode. In its 8.6/10 review, IGN wrote: "The shift to Frostbite doesn't refresh Madden NFL 18's gameplay much, but Longshot is a memorable single-player mode." EGMNow gave the game a 7/10, writing: "Although the new Longshot mode shines, Madden misses the mark with a few of its gameplay additions this year—so if you don't immediately take a liking to them and choose to ignore them, the experience will feel a lot like last year's."

=== Accolades ===
Polygon ranked it 49th on their list of the 50 best games of 2017. The game won the award for "Best Fantasy Team Mode" at Game Informer's 2017 Sports Game of the Year Awards, and was nominated for "Best Music Supervision in a Video Game" at the Guild of Music Supervisors Awards, and for "Sports Game of the Year" at the 21st Annual D.I.C.E. Awards. Longshot was nominated for Outstanding Achievement in Videogame Writing at the Writers Guild of America Awards 2017.
