= Kyle Brotzman =

American football player (born 1986)

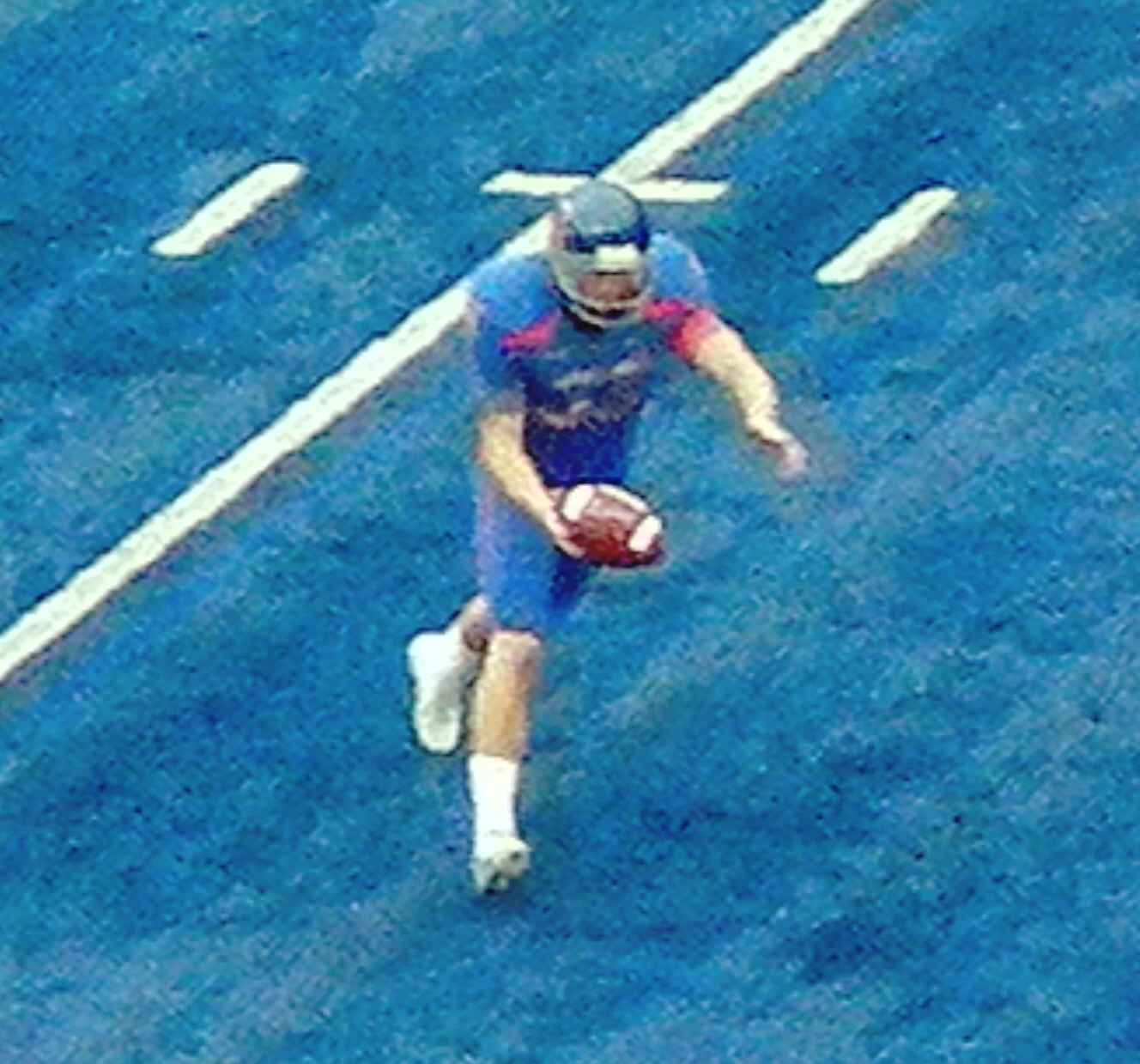
- Brotzman in a game vs San Jose State on October 31, 2009

Profile
- Position: Placekicker

Personal information
- Born: October 3, 1986 (age 40); Meridian, Idaho, U.S.
- Listed height: 5 ft 10 in (1.78 m)
- Listed weight: 190 lb (86 kg)

Career information
- High school: Meridian (Meridian, Idaho)
- College: Boise State (2007–2010)
- NFL draft: 2011: undrafted

Career history
- Utah Blaze (2011–2013); Jacksonville Sharks (2016)*; Spokane Empire (2016–2017); Idaho Horsemen (2019)
- * Offseason or practice squad member only

Career AFL statistics
- Field goals made: 3
- Field goals attempted: 7
- Extra points made: 232
- Extra points attempted: 276
- Tackles: 12
- Stats at ArenaFan.com

Kyle Brotzman (born October 3, 1986) is an American former professional football placekicker. He was a member of the Utah Blaze, Jacksonville Sharks, Spokane Empire, and Idaho Horsemen.

== College career ==
He played for the Boise State Broncos. A former walk-on, he became the Broncos' starting kicker and punter.

He garnered second-team All-WAC honors in 2007 and was Boise State's co-Special Teams Player of the Year in 2008. In the 2010 Fiesta Bowl, Brotzman threw a fourth-down pass out of punt formation that led to the Broncos' winning touchdown.

Brotzman gained national media attention when he missed two late-game field goals in the November 26, 2010 game versus the Nevada Wolf Pack. The first one, a 26-yarder at the end of regulation, would have sealed a victory for the Broncos as time ran out. The second failed attempt would have put the Broncos ahead in overtime, and was a 29-yard try. Nevada went on to win the game 34–31, dealing Boise State its first defeat of the 2010 season. Boise State coach Chris Petersen refused to directly blame the loss on Brotzman, stating that "one play can win a game but one play can't lose it. There's a lot of plays to be made that we didn't make for whatever reason." Meanwhile, Nevada's coach, Chris Ault characterized his win as the greatest in the program's history. After the game, over 45,000 Broncos fans showed their support for Brotzman on Facebook. However, he was also the recipient of death threats and hate-mail from angered Boise State fans. He graduated with the record for the most points in NCAA history by a Division I kicker.*

== Professional career ==
On June 15, 2011, he signed with the Utah Blaze of the Arena Football League. He debuted in Utah Blaze's 81-40 victory over the Pittsburgh Power.

On November 12, 2015, Brotzman was assigned to the Jacksonville Sharks. On March 10, 2016, Brotzman was placed on reassignment.

Brotzman was signed by the Spokane Empire on April 7, 2016. He was released on April 12, 2016. On March 10, 2017, Brotzman once again signed with the Empire. He was released on March 15, 2017.

On April 4, 2019, the Idaho Horsemen announced that Brotzman had signed with the team.
