= Jim Miller (quarterback) =

American football player (born 1971)

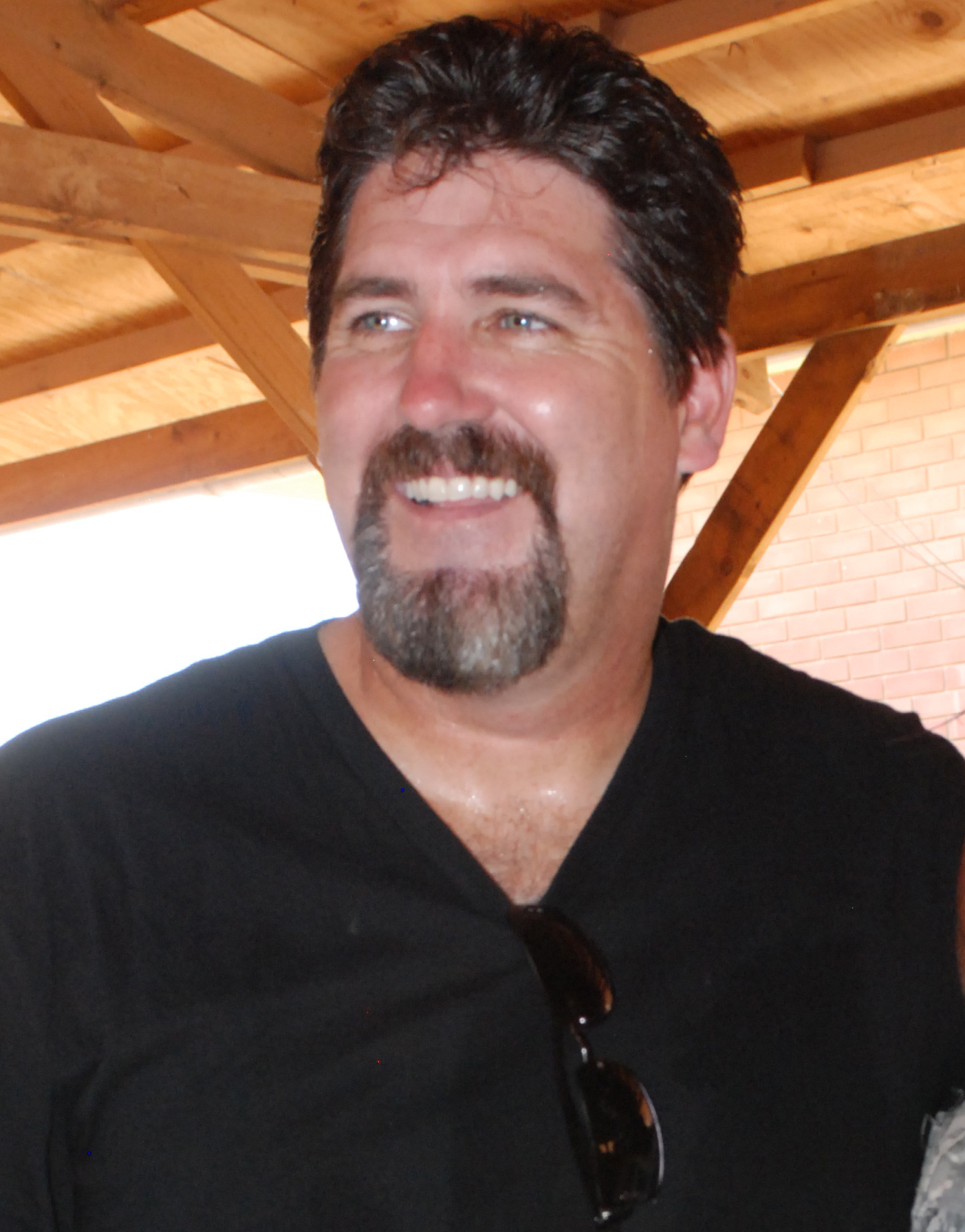
- Miller in 2010

No. 14, 16, 15, 13
- Position: Quarterback

Personal information
- Born: February 9, 1971 (age 55); Grosse Pointe, Michigan, U.S.
- Listed height: 6 ft 2 in (1.88 m)
- Listed weight: 225 lb (102 kg)

Career information
- High school: Waterford Kettering (Waterford, Michigan)
- College: Michigan State (1990–1993)
- NFL draft: 1994: 6th round, 178th overall pick

Career history
- Pittsburgh Steelers (1994–1995); Frankfurt Galaxy (1995); Pittsburgh Steelers (1996); Jacksonville Jaguars (1997); Atlanta Falcons (1997); Detroit Lions (1998)*; Dallas Cowboys (1998)*; Chicago Bears (1998–2002); Tampa Bay Buccaneers (2003); New England Patriots (2004); New York Giants (2005)*
- * Offseason or practice squad member only

Awards and highlights
- Super Bowl champion (XXXIX); World Bowl champion (1995); Second-team All-Big Ten (1993)

Career NFL statistics
- Passing attempts: 1,046
- Passing completions: 610
- Completion percentage: 58.3%
- TD–INT: 36–31
- Passing yards: 6,387
- Passer rating: 75.2
- Stats at Pro Football Reference

James Donald Miller (born February 9, 1971) is an American former professional football player who was a quarterback in National Football League (NFL), primarily with the Chicago Bears (1998–2002). He played college football for the Michigan State Spartans and was selected in the sixth round of the 1994 NFL draft. Following his playing career, Miller became a football analyst on radio and television.

== Early life ==
Miller attended Waterford Kettering High School in Waterford, Michigan, and graduated in 1989. He started as the Captain's varsity quarterback his sophomore year and held that position through his senior year. Miller also played baseball and basketball.

== College career ==
Miller was a starting quarterback for the Michigan State Spartans for three years, beginning as a sophomore. As a senior, he led the 1993 Spartans to a 6–5 regular season record, and a berth in the Liberty Bowl, which they lost to Louisville, 18–7. He finished with a final record of 14–24, and passed for a total of 5037 yards. Miller then played in the 1994 Senior Bowl, passing for 75 yards (7-for-10) and one interception.

== Professional career ==
Pre-draft measurables
Height	Weight	Arm length	Hand span	40-yard dash	10-yard split	20-yard split	20-yard shuttle	Vertical jump
6 ft 2 1/4 in (1.89 m)	227 lb (103 kg)	31 1/2 in (0.80 m)	9 3/8 in (0.24 m)	5.13 s	1.76 s	2.97 s	4.39 s	24.5 in (0.62 m)

Miller was drafted in the sixth round of the 1994 NFL draft by the Pittsburgh Steelers, 178th overall. He broke a thumb in training camp, and missed most of the 1994 season. In the spring of 1995, while still under contract with the Steelers, Miller was assigned to the Frankfurt Galaxy of the World League of American Football in order to get playing time; he played briefly with the Galaxy before suffering a wrist injury. As one of four quarterbacks on the Steelers roster in 1995, Miller would serve as the third-string quarterback behind Neil O'Donnell and Mike Tomczak and ahead of rookie Kordell Stewart, who unlike Miller was active for games under his "Slash" role while Miller was the team's designated emergency quarterback.

Following O'Donnell's departure in free agency in 1996, Miller competed with Tomczak and Stewart for the starting job and won, but was benched midway through the team's first game and Tomczak largely started for the rest of the season, with Miller demoted back to third-string behind Stewart. Miller ultimately appeared in a total of five games with the Steelers, who released him prior to the 1997 regular season in favor of Mike Quinn.

During the 1997 season, Miller was briefly with the Jacksonville Jaguars, before joining the Atlanta Falcons — he did not appear in a game for either team. Miller next signed with the Detroit Lions in March 1998, but was released by the team in August, prior to the start of the regular season. He then nearly had a contract with the Dallas Cowboys, however the Cowboys changed their mind when Mike Quinn became available. In December 1998, Miller signed with the Chicago Bears, following a season-ending injury to Erik Kramer.

It was not until 1999, in his second year with the Bears, that Miller earned a starting job. That promising season was cut short for Miller when he became the first quarterback to be suspended by the NFL for violation of its substance abuse policy. Miller contended he did not read the label on an over-the-counter dietary supplement containing the steroid nandrolone, a banned substance under the NFL's drug policy. He was suspended for four games at the end of the 1999 season and lost about $100,000 in pay.

Upon his return, Miller became established as the starter for the Bears' brief playoff run in 2001, their first berth since 1994. With the second-best record in the NFC and tied for the second-best record in the NFL along with the Pittsburgh Steelers at 13–3, the Chicago Bears were awarded a first-round bye. This was due in large part to the Bears top-ranked defense as well as the ball control offense Miller led. On January 19, 2002, the Chicago Bears met the Philadelphia Eagles in the NFC Divisional Playoffs with Miller as quarterback. The Eagles were ahead 6–0 early in the second quarter when Miller threw an interception; during the runback, Eagles' defensive end Hugh Douglas delivered a hit to Miller that resulted in a separated shoulder; Douglas was later fined $35,000 by the NFL. Miller had passed for only 23 yards (3-for-5, with 1 interception) in what was his lone playoff appearance, and Shane Matthews, who replaced Miller for the rest of the game, only passed for 66 yards (8-for-17, with 2 interceptions), as the Bears lost to the Eagles, 33–19.

Miller lost his position as starting quarterback in 2002. Although he did not make a pass attempt thereafter, he received a Super Bowl ring as the backup quarterback for the 2004 New England Patriots. Before the 2005 season, Miller signed with the New York Giants, but was released after having hip surgery and receiving an injury settlement.

== Career statistics ==
=== WLAF statistics ===
Year	Team	GP	Passing							
Year	Team	GP	Cmp	Att	Pct	Yds	Avg	TD	Int	Rtg
1995	Frankfurt Galaxy	—	23	43	53.5	236	5.5	1	1	89.6
Career		—	23	43	53.5	236	5.5	1	1	89.6

=== NFL statistics ===
Year	Team	Games			Passing							
Year	Team	GP	GS	Record	Cmp	Att	Pct	Yds	Avg	TD	Int	Rtg
1995	PIT	3	0	—	32	56	57.1	397	7.1	2	5	53.9
1996	PIT	2	1	0–1	13	25	52.0	123	4.9	0	0	65.9
1999	CHI	5	3	1–2	110	174	63.2	1,242	7.1	7	6	83.5
2000	CHI	3	2	1–1	47	82	57.3	382	4.8	1	1	68.2
2001	CHI	14	13	11–2	228	395	57.7	2,299	5.8	13	10	74.9
2002	CHI	10	8	2–6	180	314	57.3	1,944	6.2	13	9	77.5
Career		37	27	15–12	610	1,046	58.3	6,387	6.1	36	31	75.2

== Broadcasting career ==
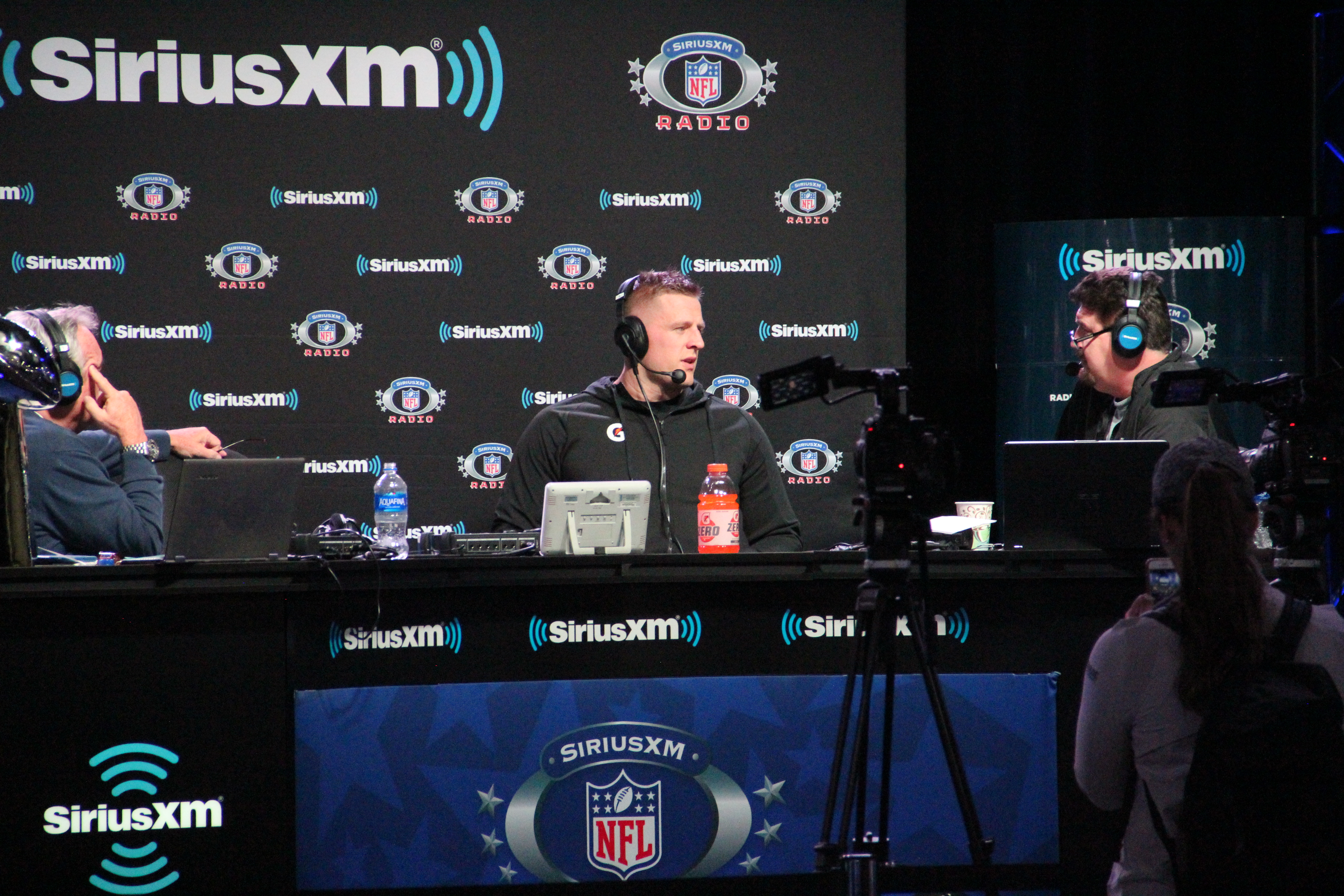
Jim Miller (right) with J. J. Watt (center) and co-host Pat Kirwan, 2019

Miller served as the color commentator for Michigan State football radio broadcasts and hosted the weekly post-game call-in show from 2006 until he took a communications position with the Bears in 2013; he was replaced by Jason Strayhorn. Miller currently serves as a studio analyst on Bears Postgame Live for NBC Sports Chicago, having replaced former Bears legend Richard Dent in 2007. Miller was the co-host of "Movin' the Chains" with Pat Kirwan on SiriusXM NFL Radio (He was hired as the co-host in September of 2013 and on February 9th, 2026, Pat announced that Jim would no longer be on the show and no longer associated with SiriusXM. No details were mentioned at the time of this announcement.), Channel 88. Miller and Kirwan are featured as analysts in Longshot, a story mode within Madden NFL 18.
