= 3 on 3 NHL Arcade =

2009 video game

- Developer: EA Canada
- Publisher: EA Sports Freestyle
- Series: NHL series
- Engine: NHL 09
- Platforms: Xbox 360, PlayStation 3
- Release: PlayStation 3: NA: February 5, 2009; EU: February 5, 2009; JP: February 12, 2009; Xbox 360: JP: February 11, 2009; NA: February 11, 2009
- Genre: Sports
- Modes: Single-player, multiplayer

3 on 3 NHL Arcade is an NHL-licensed arcade-style hockey sports game for the Xbox 360 and PlayStation 3, using the NHL 09 engine. The game was developed by NHL 09's EA Canada under the EA Sports Freestyle banner and was one of three games released using the branding alongside FaceBreaker and NASCAR Kart Racing.

A demo for the game is available on the PlayStation 3 version of NHL 11 and NHL 12. For NHL 13, there is a code to unlock the whole game.

It is delisted from both digital stores as of 2016 due to expired licenses.

== Gameplay ==
The game is pared down to single contests of three NHL players plus one goalie per team, who are big head versions of their actual selves. The game allows for multiplayer online and off-line play. The game is played on a 'first to...' basis rather than within a set time limit, meaning there can be a near-unlimited amount of periods per match. Powerups can be obtained which can give advantages to either team.

== Reception ==
Reception

Aggregate score
Aggregator	Score	
Aggregator	PS3	Xbox 360
Metacritic	66/100	64/100

Review scores
Publication	Score	
Publication	PS3	Xbox 360
1Up.com	B+	B+
Destructoid	8/10	8/10
GamePro	2.5/5	2.5/5
GameSpot	4/10	N/A
GameZone	7/10	6/10
IGN	5.9/10	5.9/10
PlayStation Official Magazine – UK	8/10	N/A
Official Xbox Magazine (US)	N/A	7/10
TeamXbox	N/A	8.6/10

The game received "mixed or average reviews" on both platforms according to the review aggregation website Metacritic.
