= Martin Čech =

Czech ice hockey player (1976–2007)

- Born: June 2, 1976; Havlíčkův Brod, Czechoslovakia
- Died: September 6, 2007 (aged 31)
- Height: 6 ft 0 in (183 cm)
- Weight: 192 lb (87 kg; 13 st 10 lb)
- Position: Defence
- Shot: Left
- Played for: HC Zlín; HC Lasselsberger Plzeň; JYP (SM-liiga); Pelicans (SM-liiga); Metallurg Magnitogorsk (RSL); HC Sibir Novosibirsk (RSL); Salavat Yulaev Ufa (RSL); HC Moeller Pardubice
- National team: Czech Republic
- NHL draft: Undrafted
- Playing career: 1993–2007

Martin Čech (June 2, 1976 in Havlíčkův Brod – September 6, 2007 in Havlíčkův Brod) was a Czech ice hockey defenceman.

Čech played in the Czech Extraliga for HC Zlín and HC Lasselsberger Plzeň before moving to Finland's SM-liiga, spending one season with JYP and two seasons with Pelicans. He then moved to the Russian Super League playing for Metallurg Magnitogorsk, HC Sibir Novosibirsk and Salavat Yulaev Ufa before returning to the Extraliga for HC Moeller Pardubice. He also represented the Czech Republic at international level. Čech was killed in a car crash on September 6, 2007. Čech appears in Electronic Arts' hockey video games NHL 09, NHL 10, and NHL 11, all of which were released after his death.
