= NHL 16 =

2015 video game

- Revised cover art featuring Jonathan Toews
- Developer: EA Canada
- Publisher: EA Sports
- Series: NHL series
- Engine: Ignite (PS4, Xbox One)
- Platforms: NHL 16: PlayStation 4; Xbox One; NHL: Legacy Edition: PlayStation 3; Xbox 360
- Release: NA: September 15, 2015; EU: September 17, 2015; AU: September 18, 2015
- Genre: Sports
- Modes: Single-player, multiplayer

NHL 16 is an ice hockey simulation video game developed by EA Canada and published by EA Sports. It is the 25th installment of the NHL series and was released on September 15, 2015, in North America and September 17 and 18 in Europe, Australia and New Zealand. The game was released on PlayStation 4 and Xbox One, with a separate release for PlayStation 3 and Xbox 360 titled NHL: Legacy Edition. Jonathan Toews of the Chicago Blackhawks is the official cover athlete, marking his second appearance on an NHL cover, following NHL 11.

Featuring game presentation in the style of the NBC Sports Network, NHL 16 runs on EA Sports' advanced Ignite game engine and features many game modes, including one that has the player take control of their own custom player and pursuing a career in the NHL and one that has the player play as the manager of any NHL team. The fan-favorite EA Sports Hockey League (EASHL) mode, an online co-operative play mode, also returns to the game after being left out of the PlayStation 4 and Xbox One versions of NHL 15, the game's predecessor. Upon release, NHL 16 received positive reviews and was declared an improvement over NHL 15 by critics. The online servers for the game were shut down on June 6, 2022.

== Gameplay ==
NHL 16 contains several game modes; "Be a GM", where the player controls the general manager of a team of their choice, "Be a Pro", where the player controls their own custom player and progresses his career, Hockey Ultimate Team, where the player collects cards of real-life players, build a team, and then take on either players online or A.I. teams, and EA Sports Hockey League, abbreviated as EASHL, a multiplayer-only mode where players can use their own custom player to join other teams, also with custom players controlled by other people, and take on other teams. The EASHL returns after being dropped from the PlayStation 4 and Xbox One versions of NHL 15. It features some changes in its progression system to address balance issues, including a switch to a class-based progression model similar to Be a Pro mode, and the removal of attributes and boosts. A beta for the EASHL mode was available for NHL 15 owners from July 30 to August 10.

Other features included are offline and online shootout modes, online team play, which has the user take control of players from real-life teams, and online versus, a simple head-to-head match. Returning to the game is the NBC Sports-style presentation, which features the network's score bug, which is now updated and can now be displayed in a transparent view instead of disappearing, as well as commentary provided by Mike "Doc" Emrick (play-by-play), Eddie Olczyk (color), and Ray Ferraro (ice-side reporter). Emrick and Olczyk's actual selves are present during the pregame intro cutscenes.

== Cover ==
NHL 16 did not have a cover vote in contrast to the previous year's iteration. At the 2015 NHL Awards, it was revealed that Patrick Kane and Jonathan Toews of the Chicago Blackhawks, who had won the 2015 Stanley Cup Finals, were selected to be on the cover of the game. It is Toews' second appearance on the cover of an NHL game, following NHL 11. It was supposed to be Kane's second appearance as well, following NHL 10, but on August 12 EA Sports announced that Kane would no longer be appearing on the cover of the game in light of the fact he was the subject of a police investigation over a sexual assault allegation.

== NHL: Legacy Edition ==
NHL: Legacy Edition is an updated version of NHL 15 for the PlayStation 3 and Xbox 360, based on NHL 14. There are some minor changes, such as the menu music; however, the EA Sports logo is instead shown for the album arts, the NHL Moments Live from 2013–14 is replaced by some new ones that were made available as the 2015-16 NHL season progressed, and in the "Custom Team" game mode the team name selection is improved. The NHL 94 Anniversary Mode is also included.

== Release ==
NHL 16 launched in North America on September 15, 2015, in both a standard edition and a deluxe set, which includes bonus content for use with the Hockey Ultimate Team game mode. NHL: Legacy Edition launched in North America on the same day as NHL 16, but it was released in a standard edition only. In Canada, an exclusive PlayStation 4 bundle launched with the game simultaneously, packaging both a PS4 console and a copy of NHL 16.

== Reception ==
Reception

Aggregate score
Aggregator	Score
Metacritic	80/100 (XB1); 78/100 (PS4)

Review scores
Publication	Score
Game Informer	7.5/10
GameRevolution	4/5
GameSpot	8/10
GameTrailers	9.0/10
IGN	7.8/10

Upon its release, NHL 16 received positive reviews from critics and received much more positive reviews compared to its predecessor, NHL 15, which received more mixed and average reviews from critics. On GameRankings, the PlayStation 4 version holds a 79.67% rating, based on 23 reviews, and the Xbox One version holds an 82.23% rating, based on 15 reviews. On Metacritic, the PlayStation 4 version holds a 78/100 rating, based on 28 reviews, and the Xbox One version holds an 80/100 rating, based on 18 reviews. Critics generally felt that NHL 16 was an improvement over NHL 15. They directed acclaim at the fun gameplay of the game's wide variety of game modes as well as the return of the EASHL mode. Some criticism was aimed mainly at some lack of depth in these game modes as well as the game's menus and interface.

Mat Paget of GameSpot awarded the game an 8/10. He complimented the content of NHL 16's game modes as well as the inclusion of the On-Ice Trainer, which he believes would help brand new players and would work very well in the game's Be A Pro mode. He stated, however, that the game's menus can sometimes be confusing to get around. For Game Informer, Matt Bertz wrote that EA Sports are heading in the right direction with NHL 16, but he felt that they failed to bring any "game-breaking quality" in terms of gameplay. Bertz complimented the game's improved artificial intelligence system for opposing teams as well as the NHL on NBC game presentation. Anthony LaBella of Game Revolution found the inclusion of several game modes to be positive for the game, but felt that some of them were not thoroughly developed enough. LaBella also enjoyed the revamped EASHL mode as well as the game's presentation.
