= NHL 26 =

2025 video game

- Standard edition cover art featuring Florida Panthers' Matthew Tkachuk
- Developer: EA Vancouver
- Publisher: EA Sports
- Series: NHL
- Engine: Frostbite
- Platforms: PlayStation 5 Xbox Series X/S
- Release: September 12, 2025
- Genre: Sports (ice hockey)
- Modes: Single-player, multiplayer

NHL 26 is an ice hockey simulation video game developed by EA Vancouver and published by EA Sports. It is the 35th installment in the NHL video game series and was released for the PlayStation 5 and Xbox Series X/S on September 12, 2025.

== Gameplay ==
The gameplay of NHL 26 uses ICE-Q 2.0 technology, an evolution of the ICE-Q technology first implemented in NHL 25. ICE-Q 2.0 incorporates NHL EDGE tracking data to inform player attributes such as skating acceleration, top speed, slap shot power, and wrist shot power. These data-driven attribute adjustments are applied to both user-controlled and AI-controlled players, with the intent of producing in-game behaviors and performance profiles that more closely resemble those of the corresponding real-world NHL players.

NHL 26 also revamps the Be A Pro game mode for the first time since NHL 21, allowing players to start their Be A Pro career in the semi-finals of the IIHF World Junior Championship, which will then determine the player's position in the NHL draft. The option to play in the Memorial Cup tournament or the Champions Hockey League tournament also still exists. Once drafted, the player can build up to an NHL superstar or get demoted to the AHL. The game mode introduces voice acting by other NHL players, such as Macklin Celebrini, as well as new cutscenes, such as seeing your player in the NHL draft, tunnel walkouts, and a Stanley Cup celebration in the locker room.

== Reception ==
Reception

Aggregate scores
Aggregator	Score
Metacritic	(PS5) 73/100 (XSXS) 70/100
OpenCritic	43% recommend

Review score
Publication	Score
IGN	6/10

NHL 26 received "mixed or average" reviews from critics, according to review aggregator Metacritic, and 43% of critics recommended the game, according to OpenCritic.

The player on the cover (Matthew Tkachuk) has received backlash due to his support of Donald Trump and his administration.
