= NHL 2001 =

2000 video game

- North American box art featuring Owen Nolan
- Developer: EA Canada
- Publisher: EA Sports
- Series: NHL
- Platforms: PlayStation, PlayStation 2, Windows
- Release: PlayStation, Windows: NA: September 27, 2000; EU: October 6, 2000; PlayStation 2: NA: October 26, 2000; EU: November 24, 2000; Elitserien/SM-Liiga 2001: EU: March 8, 2001
- Genre: Sports (ice hockey)
- Modes: Single-player, multiplayer

NHL 2001 is a video game released by Electronic Arts in 2000. It is the successor to NHL 2000. An add-on featuring Elitserien and SM-Liiga was released on the PC version on March 8, 2001, that added Swedish and Finnish hockey leagues and teams to the game. It is the tenth installment of the NHL series, the final to be released on PlayStation, and the first to be released on PlayStation 2.

== Gameplay ==
Jim Hughson remains as play-by-play announcer in the game, with Bill Clement joining as an analyst for a second time, debuting in the previous edition, NHL 2000. This is also the first NHL game to appear on the PlayStation 2 and also to include Latvia and Ukraine to the 18 national teams first featured in NHL 98 (only available in the PC and PlayStation 2 versions). There is also a brand new feature called the Momentum Bar, which goes to the team who has scored goals, done big hits, etc.

== Expansion ==
An expansion pack for the PC version of NHL 2001 including the Swedish and Finnish elite leagues was released in early 2001, titled Elitserien 2001 (SM-Liiga 2001 in Finland). It includes all 12 teams from Elitserien and all 13 teams from SM-Liiga at the time. It also includes new intro play-by-play by Arne Hegerfors in Swedish, and Mika Saukkonen in Finnish, and new public address announcer audio by Magnus Gustafsson in Swedish, and Pentti Lindegren in Finnish. The cover athlete on Elitserien 2001 is Henrik Zetterberg of Timrå IK, and the cover athlete on SM-Liiga 2001 is Raimo Helminen of Ilves.

== Reception ==
Reception

Aggregate score
Aggregator	Score		
Aggregator	PC	PS	PS2
Metacritic	90/100	88/100	85/100

Review scores
Publication	Score		
Publication	PC	PS	PS2
CNET Gamecenter	9/10	9/10	9/10
Computer Games Strategy Plus	4/5	N/A	N/A
Computer Gaming World	4.5/5	N/A	N/A
Electronic Gaming Monthly	N/A	6/10	9.5/10 (Note: Three critics of Electronic Gaming Monthly gave the PlayStation 2 version each a score of 9/10, 9.5/10, and 10/10.)
EP Daily	9.5/10	N/A	6.5/10
Game Informer	N/A	7.75/10	8.5/10
GameFan	N/A	86% (Note: In GameFan's viewpoint of the PlayStation version, one critic gave it 85, and the other 86.)	93% (Note: In GameFan's viewpoint of the PlayStation 2 version, one critic gave it 93, and the other 92.)
GameRevolution	N/A	N/A	C+
GameSpot	8.8/10	8.6/10	8/10
GameSpy	89%	N/A	84%
IGN	9/10	8.4/10	7.8/10
Next Generation	N/A	N/A	4/5
Official U.S. PlayStation Magazine	N/A	4/5	4/5
PC Gamer (US)	92%	N/A	N/A
The Cincinnati Enquirer	N/A	N/A	4.5/5

The PC version received "universal acclaim", while the PlayStation and PlayStation 2 versions received "generally favorable reviews", according to the review aggregation website Metacritic. Emmett Schkloven of X-Play gave the PS2 version four stars out of five and stated, "EA has spent a lot of effort making NHL 2001 accessible to newcomers and non-hockey fanatics. Easier controls, clean gameplay and a fast, slick interface all contribute to the company's success in this endeavor. Fortunately, the depth and realism that make hockey lovers like myself such fans of the franchise have not been sacrificed. The game is not as flawless as it could be, but it is damn close. And it's still only launch year." Jim Preston of NextGen said, "EA's first NHL effort on Playstation 2 [sic] is almost as deep as it is pretty."

Clayton Crooks of AllGame gave the PC version four-and-a-half stars out of five and said, "Hockey fans are sure to enjoy NHL 2001. It offers impressive (albeit repetitive) audio, superb graphics and animation to go along with exciting gameplay and fans of both arcade and simulation-style sports games should be able to find some aspect to enjoy. Online play, customizable rosters that are available for download from the Internet and multiple season modes make this a game that should occupy the hard drive for a long time, at least until the next version is released." Matt Grandstaff of the same website gave the PlayStation version four stars, saying that it was "a better game than its PS2 counterpart. Even though it lacks some of the many customizations available in the PS2 version and is an ugly duckling in comparison, gamers looking for the most authentic hockey action for the 2000-2001 season should go with the PS version -- even if they own a PS2." However, Terry Chung gave the PS2 version three stars, calling it "a worthy attempt at bringing the series to a 128-bit system, but with a few minor problems that need to be worked out, it should have been sent down to the minors for some reconditioning before coming back up."

Kevin "BIFF" Giacobbi of GameZone gave the PC version a perfect ten, calling it "a must have". Kevin Krause later gave the PlayStation 2 version 9.3 out of 10, calling it "a great game overall and the innovative new features put it yet another step ahead of the pack. My recommendation? Pick this one up!"

John Marrin of GamePro said that the PC version "isn't perfect, but it's about as close as EA has come in the past. The coaching strategies, gameplay options, and superb graphics make this one sports experience that PC gamers should be thankful for." (Note: GamePro gave the PC version two 4.5/5 scores for graphics and sound, and two 5/5 scores for control and fun factor.) Human Tornado said in one GamePro review that the PlayStation version "keeps its lead over Sony's NHL FaceOff, but every year, that gap gets smaller. Still, NHL 2001 has better controls and coaching strategies, and the plethora of options rounds out this excellent hockey package. NHL 2001 takes this year's PlayStation Championship, but it was a tight seven game showdown." (Note: GamePro gave the PlayStation version 4.5/5 for graphics, 4/5 for sound, and two 5/5 scores for control and fun factor in one review.) In another GamePro review, Air Hendrix said of the same console version, "If you're not a huge hockey fan, NHL 2001 is similar enough to its 2000 edition that you may be content with that version. For the hockey hardcore, the tuned A.I. and new features make NHL 2001 the only game in town." (Note: GamePro gave the PlayStation version two 4.5/5 scores for graphics and sound, and two 5/5 scores for control and fun factor in another review.) The former author said in one GamePro review, "NHL 2001 for the PS2 is one of the finest console sports games ever to ship. The sweet gameplay, delicious game options, intense graphics, and jamming audio make it a fantastic hockey simulation, and one of the best games to ship for the PS2 on launch day." (Note: GamePro gave the PlayStation 2 version three 5/5 scores for graphics, control, and fun factor, and 4.5/5 for sound in one review.) In another GamePro review, the latter author said of the same PlayStation 2 version, "All told, NHL 2001 is an impressive example of next-gen sports action, ranking it as one of the new system's best titles. If you were lucky enough to score a PS2 at launch, make sure you grab a copy of this gem to go with it." (Note: GamePro gave the PlayStation 2 version all perfect 5/5 scores for graphics, sound, control, and fun factor in another review.)

The PS2 version was a runner-up for GameSpot's annual "Best PlayStation 2 Game" award, which went to SSX. In the same way the PC version was a runner-up for the website's annual "Sports Game of the Year" award, which went to FIFA 2001. The same PC version won the award for Sports Game of the Year at the CNET Gamecenter Computer Game Awards for 2000. The staff of Computer Games Magazine nominated the same PC version for their 2000 "Sports Game of the Year" award, whose winner remains unknown. It was a runner-up for "Sports Game of 2000" in both Editors' Choice and Readers' Choice at IGN's Best of 2000 Awards.

According to PC Data, NHL 2001 sold 190,000 units in 2000 for the PlayStation 2.
