= NHL 2015 =

NHL 2015 may refer to:

- 2014–15 NHL season
- 2015–16 NHL season
- NHL 15, video game
- 2015 National Hurling League
