= NHL 24 =

- Standard edition cover art featuring Colorado Avalanche's Cale Makar
- Developer: EA Vancouver
- Publisher: EA Sports
- Series: NHL
- Engine: Frostbite 3
- Platforms: PlayStation 4 PlayStation 5 Xbox One; Xbox Series X/S
- Release: October 6, 2023
- Genre: Sports (ice hockey)
- Modes: Single-player, multiplayer

NHL 24 is an ice hockey simulation video game developed by EA Vancouver and published by EA Sports. It is the 33rd installment in the NHL video game series and was released for the PlayStation 4, PlayStation 5, Xbox One and Xbox Series X/S on October 6, 2023. NHL 24 was also the last NHL game to be released on PlayStation 4 and Xbox One and the last to feature the Arizona Coyotes, who suspended operations in April 2024.

== Features ==
NHL 24 has much of its gameplay overhauled from NHL 23, including new total control skill moves, a new stamina engine, goalie fatigue, passing system, and physics based contact. The new total control skill moves lets the player perform complex deke moves with the tap of a single button. The new passing system lets you pass the puck to other players using the four face buttons on the controller in team play, and the new body checking system, which sees players charge their hits by holding down the button, works identically to Bruise Control from NHL 2004, which lets you charge your body check and timing it well will result in more successful and harder body checks. Body checking players into benches and broken glass also return to NHL 24.

NHL 24 also features full crossplay for Hockey Ultimate Team and World Of Chel, unlike NHL 23 that only featured crossplay matchmaking.

== Reception ==
Reception

Aggregate score
Aggregator	Score
Metacritic	(PS5) 71/100 (XSXS) 72/100

Review scores
Publication	Score
Hardcore Gamer	3/5
IGN	7/10
Push Square	5/10 stars
Shacknews	6/10

NHL 24 received "mixed or average" reviews, according to review aggregator website Metacritic, a slight improvement over the prior installment of the franchise.

Despite the scores remaining similar, many reviewers pointed to the lack of concrete changes, and the failure to implement new changes and features successfully made Push Square reviewer Graham Banas feel that the developers "took steps backward". Even IGN's review, not commonly critical of the franchise, considered the state of the franchise "stale" and the modes present in the game "as standard as ever".

The user score for NHL 24 on Metacritic has the game received as "generally unfavorable".
