= NHL 2016 =

NHL 2016 may refer to:

- 2015–16 NHL season
- 2016–17 NHL season
- NHL 16, video game
- 2016 National Hurling League
