= James Cybulski =

Canadian broadcaster

James Cybulski is a Canadian broadcaster best known as the former play by play voice for the NHL video game franchise from EA Sports. Cybulski also worked as host of The Starting Lineup on Sportsnet 650 Vancouver from 2017-2021. Prior to his role on Sportsnet 650 Vancouver, he hosted Cybulski and Company on TSN Radio 1050, and worked as a television sportscaster and reporter for SportsCentre on TSN and Sportsnet Central on Sportsnet Pacific.

== Life and career ==
Born and raised in Ottawa, Ontario, he graduated from the radio broadcasting program at Algonquin College in 1995. Cybulski played minor hockey for the Gloucester Cougars. He subsequently worked as a reporter for CHEZ 106, as well as a colour commentator for the Ottawa 67s, and later hosted Overtime, a program devoted to the Ottawa Senators, on Rogers Television. He subsequently worked as a sports reporter for CFRA and The Score as well as the Team 1040 in Vancouver before joining TSN in 2006. Cybulski also worked as an on-scene correspondent for the 2010 Winter Olympics in Vancouver, British Columbia for which he received a Gemini award nomination for Best Sports Reporting. The following year, he won the Gemini Award for Best Sports Feature for his story on the relationship between Terry Fox and Jay Triano.

In February 2013 it was announced that Cybulski was leaving TSN to pursue other opportunities. In late June 2013, Sportsnet hired Cybulski as their anchor and reporter for Sportsnet Central on Sportsnet Pacific in August. On January 23, 2014, Cybulski and Caroline Cameron were named the co-anchors for the morning edition of Sportsnet Central. Cybulski worked at Sportsnet until March 2016. In 2017, Cybulski joined Sportsnet 650 Vancouver where he hosted the morning show until April 2021.

In a June 2019 Game Informer article, it was announced that Cybulski would be replacing Mike Emrick as the play-by-play commentator for the EA Sports video game, NHL 20, teaming up with lead analyst Ray Ferraro, and remained as commentator after Cheryl Pounder replaced Ferraro as an analyst in NHL 24. Cybulski remained as play-by-play commentator until he was replaced by John Buccigross for NHL 27.

In October 2021, it was announced that Cybulski would be the play by play voice for The Vancouver Canucks American Hockey League affiliate, the Abbotsford Canucks.
