= NHLPA (disambiguation) =

NHLPA may refer to:

- National Hockey League Players' Association, a players' union
- National Historic Lighthouse Preservation Act of 2000
- NHLPA Hockey '93, a video game released by Electronic Arts for the Genesis and Super NES video game platforms in 1992
