= NHL Slapshot =

2010 video game

- Developer: EA Canada
- Publisher: EA Sports
- Series: NHL series
- Platform: Wii
- Release: NA: September 7, 2010; EU: September 16, 2010
- Genre: Sports (ice hockey)
- Modes: Single-player; Multiplayer

NHL Slapshot is EA Sports' first ice hockey video game on the Wii, released in 2010. It was the first game in the NHL series since NHL 2005 to receive an Everyone rating from the ESRB, mainly because the game does not include fighting.

== Game cover ==
Wayne Gretzky is the game's cover athlete. This marked the first time that the EA Sports NHL series featured a retired ice hockey player on the cover as well as Wayne Gretzky's first appearance on a cover of a video game since Gretzky NHL 2006.

== Hockey stick peripheral ==
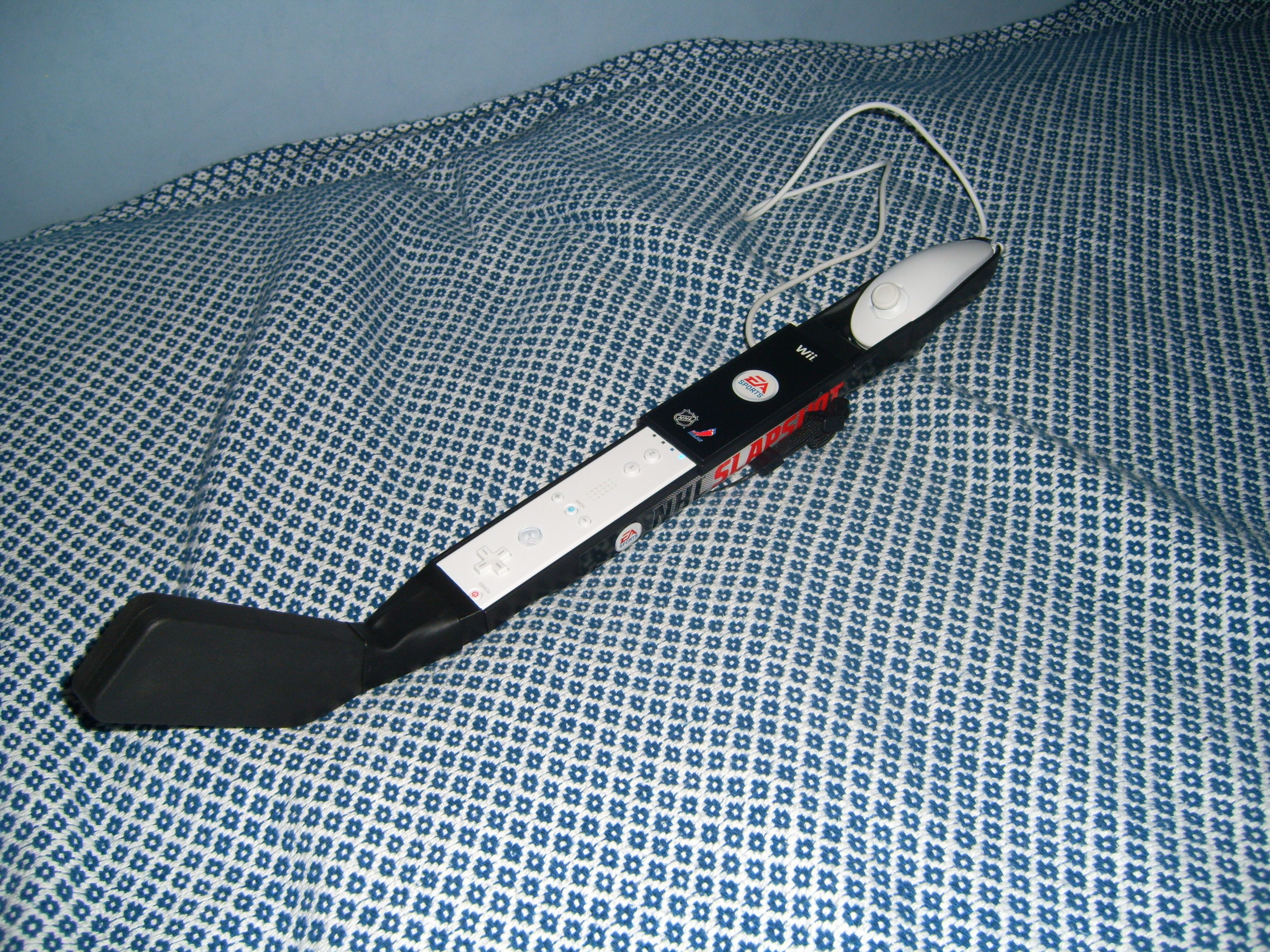
The hockey stick peripheral for NHL Slapshot

A miniature hockey stick peripheral was released with the game, allowing (but not requiring) the player to insert the Wii Remote and its Nunchuk attachment and simulate playing with a real hockey stick.

== Reception ==
Reception

Aggregate score
Aggregator	Score
Metacritic	76/100

Review scores
Publication	Score
1Up.com	B
G4	3/5 stars
Game Informer	7/10
GameSpot	8/10
GamesRadar+	4/5 stars
GameTrailers	6.9/10
GameZone	6.5/10
IGN	8/10
Nintendo Power	6/10
Nintendo World Report	8/10

The game received "generally favorable reviews" according to the review aggregation website Metacritic.

== See also ==
- NHL 11, another ice hockey video game by EA Sports, released for the PlayStation 3 and Xbox 360
- NHL 2K11, another ice hockey video game, by 2K Sports for the Wii and iOS
