= NHL 2014 =

NHL 2014 may refer to:

- 2013–14 NHL season
- 2014–15 NHL season
- NHL 14, video game
- 2014 National Hurling League
