= NHL 27 =

2026 video game

- Standard edition cover art featuring San Jose Sharks' Macklin Celebrini
- Developer: EA Vancouver
- Publisher: EA Sports
- Series: NHL
- Engine: Frostbite
- Platforms: PlayStation 5 Xbox Series X/S
- Release: September 11, 2026
- Genre: Sports (ice hockey)
- Modes: Single-player, multiplayer

NHL 27 is an ice hockey simulation video game developed by EA Vancouver and published by EA Sports. It is the 36th installment in the NHL video game series and was released for the PlayStation 5 and Xbox Series X/S on September 11, 2026.

The game's cover athlete, San Jose Sharks centre Macklin Celebrini, became the youngest player to make the cover in the series' history at 20 years old.

== Gameplay ==
Connected Franchise Mode, a returning feature from NHL 14 under a new name, allows players to connect with up to 32 other users to each manage an National Hockey League (NHL) franchise. The game's AI behaviour also saw updates based on data gathered from NHL EDGE, the NHL's dedicated puck and player tracker. Each team has its own Team Playbook, representing tactical approaches that are modeled on the play styles of the real world counterparts. Broadcasts received a visual overhaul; intro presentations now feature players exiting from their team's locker room tunnels and the goal celebrations for most teams feature real songs. John Buccigross and Darren Pang form the new commentary team, replacing James Cybulski and Cheryl Pounder.

=== Use of AI ===
Electronic Arts confirmed the use of generative AI in a software update blog post on September 11, 2026 citing a commitment to improve authenticity. The AI was used to create additional voice lines on top of prerecorded dialogue with explicit permission from new colour commentators Buccigross and Pang. Buccigross had previously discussed the publisher's use of generative AI in an episode of the Chirping Zebras podcast on September 3, 2026, expressing his enthusiasm for it, stating, "They played me some stuff back in my voice. It's like, wow, that's pretty good." He also recalled errors that required human correction during development.

== Soundtrack ==
The soundtrack for NHL 27 was revealed on September 3, 2026, featuring 33 songs. Much of the soundtrack consists of goal songs used by the teams in the National Hockey League, such as "Kernkraft 400" by Zombie Nation (used by the Boston Bruins), "Song 2" by Blur (used by the Ottawa Senators), and "Puck Off" by Pantera (used by the Dallas Stars). Other artists include Andrew W.K., DJ Khaled, Hall & Oates, Kiss, Mötley Crüe, Nickelback, Panic! at the Disco, Simple Minds, The Fratellis, and Tim McGraw.

== Reception ==
Reception

Aggregate scores
Aggregator	Score
Metacritic	(PS5) 68/100 (XSXS) 62/100
OpenCritic	29% recommend

Review scores
Publication	Score
Game Informer	6.5/10
IGN	6/10

NHL 27 received "mixed or average" reviews from critics, according to review aggregator website Metacritic, and 29% of critics recommended the game, according to OpenCritic.

The game's player face scans received widespread criticism for their inaccuracy. ESPN interviewed select NHL players regarding their face scans during the league's Media Tour in Las Vegas, Nevada; some reacted negatively, including Seattle Kraken centre Matty Beniers, Chicago Blackhawks centre Frank Nazar, and Montreal Canadiens winger Cole Caufield, with the latter describing his player model as having "[seen] a ghost or something."

Writing for Game Informer, Joshua Khan criticized the game's use of generative AI for play-by-play commentary, describing the feature as doing "a grave injustice to the new play-by-play talent." Khan also noted sequences of dialogue generated by the AI that regularly used incorrect vernacular or mispronounced player names.
