= NHL (video game series) =

Ice hockey video game series

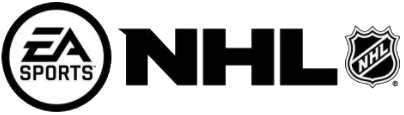
- Genre: Sports (ice hockey)
- Developer: EA Vancouver: Previous developers: Budcat Creations, EA Montreal, High Score Productions, Park Place Productions, Tiertex Design Studios, Visual Concepts, HB Studios
- Publisher: EA Sports
- Platforms: Game Boy, Game Boy Color, Game Boy Advance, GameCube, Game Gear, MS-DOS, Nintendo 64, Playstation, PlayStation 2, PlayStation 3, PlayStation 4, PlayStation 5, PlayStation Portable, Sega CD, Sega Genesis, Sega Saturn, SNES, Xbox, Xbox 360, Xbox One, Xbox Series X/S, Wii, Windows
- First release: NHL Hockey; August 1991
- Latest release: NHL 27; September 11, 2026

NHL (colloquially referred to as Chel) is a series of professional ice hockey simulation video games developed by EA Vancouver and published yearly by Electronic Arts under the EA Sports brand. The game is developed under license from the National Hockey League (NHL), which enables the use of the league's team names, arenas and colors in the game, and the National Hockey League Players' Association (NHLPA), which enables the use of the league's player names and likenesses.

== Installments ==
In NHL Hockey from 1991, the game modes were season and playoff, and due to the license, the game was called EA Hockey in Europe and featured 22 national teams instead. NHLPA Hockey '93 was without the NHL license, so instead of NHL team names and logos, there were only cities. Game modes added in NHL 95 were exhibition, training, shootout and the possibility to edit and trade individual players in teams. On PC, NHL 96 was in 3D with 2D player textures, fights are back (most recently in the first two games). NHL 97 was the first full 3D installment, the national teams of Canada, USA and Russia have been added, the other two teams contain a compilation of the best European players. In NHL 98, 18 national teams were already included. In NHL 99, the career mode was added and in NHL 2000, the tournament mode.

Title	Year	Platforms	Standard edition cover athletes, worldwide	Cover athletes, specific regions and editions
NHL Hockey	1991	GEN	Glenn Healy (Los Angeles Kings)	–
NHLPA Hockey '93	1992	GEN, SNES	Rod Brind'Amour (Philadelphia); Mike Richter (New York Rangers); Randy Moller (New York Rangers)	–
NHL '94	1993	DOS^{†}, SCD, GEN, SNES	Tomas Sandstrom (Los Angeles); Andy Moog (Boston)	–
NHL 95	1994	DOS, GB, GG^{†}, GEN, SNES	Alexei Kovalev (New York Rangers); Kirk McLean (Vancouver)	–
NHL 96	1995	DOS, GB, GEN, SNES	Scott Stevens (New Jersey); Steve Yzerman (Detroit)	–
NHL 97	1996	DOS, PS1, SAT, GEN, SNES, WIN	John Vanbiesbrouck (Florida)	–
NHL 98	1997	PS1, SAT, GEN, SNES, WIN	Peter Forsberg (Colorado)	–
NHL 99	1998	N64, PS1, WIN	Eric Lindros (Philadelphia)	–
NHL 2000	1999	GBC, PS1, WIN	Chris Pronger (St. Louis)	^{EU} Markus Näslund (Vancouver); ^{CZE} Richard Smehlik (Buffalo)
NHL 2001	2000	PS1, PS2, WIN	Owen Nolan (San Jose)	^{EU} Jere Lehtinen (Dallas); ^{CZE} Martin Rucinsky (Montreal)
NHL 2002	2001	GBA, PS2, WIN, Xbox	Mario Lemieux (Pittsburgh)	–
NHL 2003	2002	GCN, PS2, WIN, Xbox	Jarome Iginla (Calgary)	^{CZE} Patrik Elias (New Jersey); ^{FIN} Saku Koivu (Montreal)
NHL 2004	2003	GCN, PS2, WIN, Xbox	Dany Heatley (Atlanta)^{‡}; Joe Sakic (Colorado)	–
NHL 2005	2004	GCN, PS2, WIN, Xbox	Markus Näslund (Vancouver)	^{FIN} Olli Jokinen (Florida)
NHL 06	2005	GCN, PS2, WIN, Xbox	Vincent Lecavalier (Tampa Bay)	^{FIN} Tuomo Ruutu (Chicago)
NHL 07	2006	X360, PS2, PSP, WIN, Xbox	Alexander Ovechkin (Washington)	^{FIN} Teemu Selänne (Anaheim); ^{SWE} Henrik Lundqvist (New York Rangers)
NHL 08	2007	PS3, X360, PS2, WIN	Eric Staal (Carolina)	^{CZE}Jaromír Jágr (New York Rangers); ^{FIN} Teemu Selänne (Anaheim); ^{SUI} Mark Streit (Montreal); ^{SWE} Henrik Zetterberg (Detroit)
NHL 09	2008	PS3, X360, PS2, WIN	Dion Phaneuf (Calgary)	^{RUS} Alexander Ovechkin (Washington); ^{SWE} Daniel Alfredsson (Ottawa); ^{CZE} Patrik Elias (New Jersey)
3 on 3 NHL Arcade	2009	PS3, X360	None	–
NHL 10	2009	PS3, X360	Patrick Kane (Chicago)	^{DEN} Mikkel Boedker (Phoenix); ^{FIN} Mikko Koivu (Minnesota); ^{SUI} Mark Streit (New York Islanders); ^{SWE} Nicklas Backstrom (Washington); In Switzerland, special slip covers were made featuring a player from each team in the Swiss National League. These were sold through each team's online storefront and limited to 400 copies per team.
NHL 11	2010	PS3, X360	Jonathan Toews (Chicago)	^{SWE} Daniel and Henrik Sedin (Vancouver); ^{SUI} Mark Streit (NY Islanders)
NHL Slapshot	2010	Wii	Wayne Gretzky (Edmonton)	–
NHL 12	2011	PS3, X360	Steven Stamkos (Tampa Bay)	^{SUI} Jonas Hiller (Anaheim)
NHL 13	2012	PS3, X360	Claude Giroux (Philadelphia)	^{SUI} Roman Josi (Nashville); In Ottawa, Canada, a special edition alternative cover was made, showing Mika Zibanejad (Ottawa).; In Quebec, Canada, a special edition alternative cover was made, showing P. K. Subban (Montreal).; In Edmonton, at the Kingsway Mall, EB Games had a special alternative cover, showing Jordan Eberle (Edmonton).; In Burnaby, Canada, at Metropolis at Metrotown, EB Games had a special edition alternative cover, showing Henrik Sedin (Vancouver).; In Finland, a special edition was made, featuring Jari Kurri.
NHL 14	2013	PS3, X360	Martin Brodeur (New Jersey)	^{SUI} Roman Josi (Nashville); In Edmonton, at the West Edmonton Mall, EB Games had a special alternative cover, showing Jordan Eberle (Edmonton).; In Toronto, a special edition alternative cover was made, showing James van Riemsdyk (Toronto). In Ottawa, a special edition alternative cover was made, showing Craig Anderson (Ottawa).; In Sweden, special edition alternative covers were made, showing William Karlsson (HV71), Mattias Janmark (AIK IF), Patrik Hersley (Leksands IF), Linus Klasen (Luleå HF), and Dick Axelsson (Frölunda HC).; In Finland, special editions were made for each Liiga team.
NHL 15	2014	PS4, XBO, PS3, X360	Patrice Bergeron (Boston)	^{SUI} Nino Niederreiter (Minnesota); In Toronto, at a surprise autograph signing in a downtown Tim Hortons, a special edition alternative cover was made, showing James van Riemsdyk (Toronto).; In Edmonton, a special edition alternative cover was made, showing Justin Schultz (Edmonton).; In Sweden, special edition alternative covers were made, showing Niclas Andersen (Brynäs IF), Mattias Tedenby (HV71), Samuel Påhlsson (MODO), Mikael Tellqvist (Djurgårdens IF), Jens Bergenström (Leksands IF), Erik Forssell (Skellefteå), Robin Figren (Frölunda HC), Chad Kolarik (Linköpings HC), Tomi Kallio (Växjö), Fredrik Pettersson-Wentzel (Färjestad BK), Per Ledin (Luleå HF), and Jared Aulin (Örebro HK).; In Finland, special editions were made for each Liiga team.
NHL 16	2015	PS4, XBO	Jonathan Toews (Chicago)^{‡}	^{SUI} Nino Niederreiter (Minnesota Wild)
NHL: Legacy Edition	2015	PS3, X360	None (Stanley Cup pictured instead)	–
NHL 17	2016	PS4, XBO	Vladimir Tarasenko (St. Louis)	^{SUI} Nino Niederreiter (Minnesota)
NHL 18	2017	PS4, XBO	Connor McDavid (Edmonton)	^{SUI} Roman Josi (Nashville) (downloadable)
NHL 19	2018	PS4, XBO	P. K. Subban (Nashville)	^{FIN} Patrik Laine (Winnipeg)^{SWE} William Nylander (Toronto) Ultimate edition: Wayne Gretzky (Edmonton)
NHL 20	2019	PS4, XBO	Auston Matthews (Toronto)	^{FIN} Patrik Laine (Winnipeg)^{SWE} Elias Pettersson (Vancouver)
NHL 21	2020	PS4, XBO	Alexander Ovechkin (Washington)	–
NHL 22	2021	PS4, XBO, PS5, XSX/S	Auston Matthews (Toronto)	–
NHL 23	2022	PS4, XBO, PS5, XSX/S	Trevor Zegras (Anaheim) and Sarah Nurse (Canada)	–
NHL 24	2023	PS4, XBO, PS5, XSX/S	Cale Makar (Colorado)	–
NHL 25	2024	PS5, XSX/S	Quinn Hughes (Vancouver)	^{US} Jack Hughes (New Jersey) Deluxe edition: Luke Hughes (New Jersey) along with his brothers Quinn and Jack. This version wasn't released in a physical format.
NHL 26	2025	PS5, XSX/S	Matthew Tkachuk (Florida)	Deluxe edition: Brady Tkachuk (Ottawa) and Keith Tkachuk (St. Louis) along with Matthew.
NHL 27	2026	PS5, XSX/S	Macklin Celebrini (San Jose)	–

^†as NHL Hockey
^‡Joe Thornton was originally chosen, but EA switched to Dany Heatley after Thornton was accused of assaulting two police officers. Thornton's cover was never produced. After the 2003–04 season had begun, Heatley was involved in a car crash that killed teammate Dan Snyder, prompting EA to switch covers to one featuring Joe Sakic.
^‡ ‡Patrick Kane was originally slated to share the cover with teammate Jonathan Toews, however, following sexual assault claims made against Kane, he was dropped from the cover.
^EUin Europe; ^DENin Denmark; ^FINin Finland; ^RUSin Russia; ^SWEin Sweden; ^SUI in Switzerland; ^CZEin Czech Republic; ^USin United States

== Leagues ==
In addition to the NHL itself, the different installments of the game include development leagues like the American Hockey League and ECHL, major junior leagues like the member leagues of the Canadian Hockey League, European national leagues from Russia, Sweden, Finland, Germany, Austria, Switzerland and Czech Republic, and the European Champions Hockey League.

== Game covers ==
NHL 95 cover for the Mega Drive

As is traditional with EA Sports, the NHL series boxes feature live action photos instead of drawings. As it lacked the NHLPA license, the early titles staged photos without real players. NHLPA Hockey 93, on the other hand, had the rights to use player images, but not of the teams. On this cover, the main action photo features the New York Rangers' Randy Moller checking the Philadelphia Flyers' Rod Brind'Amour while Rangers goaltender Mike Richter makes a save (in this photo there is the logo of the New York Rangers located on the bottom right of the goaltender's pants). This photo is surrounded by eight small portraits of players (Steve Yzerman, Andy Moog, Pat LaFontaine, Brian Leetch, Ray Bourque, Patrick Roy, Jeremy Roenick, and Rick Tocchet). This changed with NHL 94, which featured a goal situation for Tomas Sandstrom (Los Angeles Kings) against Andy Moog (Boston Bruins). NHL 95 featured an in-goal camera during a goal scored by Alexei Kovalev of the New York Rangers during the 1994 Stanley Cup Final against Kirk McLean of the Vancouver Canucks. NHL 96 featured New Jersey's Scott Stevens and Detroit's Steve Yzerman. More recently, Claude Giroux was featured on the cover of NHL 13 and Martin Brodeur was on the cover of NHL 14. On June 24, 2014, EA Sports announced at the 2014 NHL Awards in Las Vegas that Patrice Bergeron of the Boston Bruins would be the official cover athlete for NHL 15. In 2015, during the NHL awards, it was announced that the cover of NHL 16 would feature Jonathan Toews and Patrick Kane carrying the Stanley Cup together. However, on August 12, 2015, EA announced that Kane would not be appearing on the cover or participating in any promotional activities for the game in light of a criminal investigation he was involved in. Instead, the cover featured Toews alone. At the 2016 NHL Awards, it was announced that Vladimir Tarasenko of the St. Louis Blues was to appear on the cover of NHL 17. On June 21, 2017, during the 2017 NHL Awards, EA announced that Connor McDavid of the Edmonton Oilers would be the cover athlete on NHL 18. On August 22, 2024, EA announced that Quinn Hughes of the Vancouver Canucks would be the Canadian and international cover athlete, and Jack Hughes of the New Jersey Devils would be the US regional cover athlete on NHL 25. And on the deluxe edition cover of NHL 25, all three Hughes brothers (including Luke Hughes of the New Jersey Devils) are the cover athletes together, which is for the first time in video game history that three siblings are on a video game cover art together. On August 4, 2025, EA announced that Matthew Tkachuk would be the cover athlete for NHL 26 where he is seen hoisting the Stanley Cup. This is the first time since NHL 16 where a defending Stanley Cup champion, as well as the Stanley Cup itself is on the cover.

== Commentary ==
In NHLPA '93 and NHL '94, Emmy award-winning sportscaster Ron Barr gives a pre-game scouting report prior to each game. In the Genesis version of NHL 95, KNBR radio sportscaster John Shrader replaced Ron Barr in that duty. Live play-by-play commentary was introduced in the PC version of NHL 97. Jim Hughson, former play-by-play man for CBC's Hockey Night in Canada and also one of Canada's best-known hockey announcers, provided the play-by-play for much of the series. The last games in which he is one of the announcers are the PC and PS2 versions of NHL 09. Bill Clement was the sole commentator in the Nintendo 64 version of NHL 99. Gary Thorne provided the play-by-play commentary in all Xbox 360 and PlayStation 3 versions from NHL 07 through NHL 14. NBC Sports commentator Mike Emrick and Eddie Olczyk provided the play-by-play and color commentary on all platforms, with their first appearance together being in NHL 15 and last in NHL 19. NHL 15 was also the first game to introduce an ice level analyst, with TSN analyst Ray Ferraro appearing in the Xbox One and PlayStation 4 versions of the game. Color commentary has been provided by Daryl Reaugh (NHL 98–99), Bill Clement (NHL 2000–2001, and NHL 07–14 for the Xbox 360 and PlayStation 3), Don Taylor (NHL 2002–2003), Craig Simpson (NHL 2004–09), Eddie Olczyk (NHL 15–19). James Cybulski provided the play-by-play commentary and Ferraro made the jump from ice-level analyst to full color commentator in NHL 20 (NHL 20–23). Ferraro was replaced by Cheryl Pounder as color commentator in NHL 24 (NHL 24-26). Cybulski was replaced by ESPN play-by-play commentator John Buccigross and Pounder was replaced by former NHL goaltender Darren Pang on color commentary in NHL 27.

Commentary Team
Games	Commentary Team
NHL 97	Jim Hughson
NHL 98	Jim Hughson, Daryl Reaugh
NHL 99	Jim Hughson, Daryl Reaugh and Bill Clement
NHL 2000	Jim Hughson, Bill Clement
NHL 2001	Jim Hughson, Bill Clement
NHL 2002	Jim Hughson, Don Taylor
NHL 2003	Jim Hughson, Don Taylor
NHL 2004	Jim Hughson, Craig Simpson
NHL 2005	Jim Hughson, Craig Simpson
NHL 06	Jim Hughson, Craig Simpson
NHL 07	Jim Hughson, Craig Simpson (WIN, PS2) Gary Thorne, Bill Clement (PS3, X360)
NHL 08	Jim Hughson, Craig Simpson (WIN, PS2) Gary Thorne, Bill Clement (PS3, X360)
NHL 09	Jim Hughson, Craig Simpson (WIN, PS2) Gary Thorne, Bill Clement (PS3, X360)
NHL 10	Gary Thorne, Bill Clement
NHL Slapshot	Gary Thorne, Bill Clement
NHL 11	Gary Thorne, Bill Clement
NHL 12	Gary Thorne, Bill Clement
NHL 13	Gary Thorne, Bill Clement
NHL 14	Gary Thorne, Bill Clement
NHL 15	Mike Emrick, Eddie Olczyk, and Ray Ferraro
NHL: Legacy Edition	Mike Emrick, Eddie Olczyk, and Ray Ferraro
NHL 16	Mike Emrick, Eddie Olczyk, and Ray Ferraro
NHL 17	Mike Emrick, Eddie Olczyk, and Ray Ferraro
NHL 18	Mike Emrick, Eddie Olczyk, and Ray Ferraro
NHL 19	Mike Emrick, Eddie Olczyk, and Ray Ferraro
NHL 20	James Cybulski, Ray Ferraro
NHL 21	James Cybulski, Ray Ferraro
NHL 22	James Cybulski, Ray Ferraro
NHL 23	James Cybulski, Ray Ferraro
NHL 24	James Cybulski, Cheryl Pounder
NHL 25	James Cybulski, Cheryl Pounder
NHL 26	James Cybulski, Cheryl Pounder
NHL 27	John Buccigross, Darren Pang

== Soundtracks ==
NHL 99 was the first game in the series to feature fully licensed music from David Bowie for the intro video. Since then, each game has had soundtracks of licensed music known as EA Sports Trax, with selections of punk, alternative, and rock music. Electronic and hip hop music was later added to the mix in later games. NHL 15 and NHL 16 on PlayStation 4 and Xbox One use an original orchestral score instead for the menus, while the soundtrack continues playing in the arenas. NHL 17 returned to the traditional EA Trax feature and also allowed the option to switch back to the original score from NHL 15.

== See also ==
- List of ice hockey video games
- Sports game
