= NHL 18 =

2017 video game

- Cover art featuring Edmonton Oilers captain Connor McDavid
- Developer: EA Canada
- Publisher: EA Sports
- Series: NHL
- Engine: Ignite
- Platforms: PlayStation 4 Xbox One
- Release: September 15, 2017
- Genre: Sports
- Modes: Single-player, multiplayer

NHL 18 is an ice hockey simulation video game developed by EA Canada and published by EA Sports. It was released on PlayStation 4 and Xbox One on September 15, 2017. It is the 27th installment in the NHL video game series and features Edmonton Oilers captain Connor McDavid on the cover. The online servers for the game were shut down on June 6, 2022.

== Gameplay ==
NHL 18 has several new features, highlighted by the brand new NHL Threes mode, which mimics NHL overtime rules with 3-on-3 hockey. The mode features a smaller rink, bigger hits, and even a different announcer as it offers a more arcade-like look at hockey. Mascots from NHL teams are also playable in this mode.

NHL 18 also features a brand new Defensive Skill Stick, allowing players more freedom in how they play defense by being able to manually target their stick to poke check the puck away from opponents or block passes. Additionally, new deke moves were added, giving players more opportunities to create flashy scoring chances. The computer AI was also upgraded to be able to perform more complex plays, including using the Defensive Skill Stick and Creative Attack Dekes.

To further promote 3-on-3 gameplay, EASHL, one of NHL 18's online competitive game modes, now features a native 3-on-3 mode. Hockey Ultimate Team also features new HUT Challenges, giving players certain challenges to complete within three 2-minute periods, against AI of varying difficulties, for in-game rewards.

== Teams and changes ==
Teams from HockeyAllsvenskan, EBEL and Champions Hockey League make their first appearance. The expansion franchise Vegas Golden Knights from the NHL are also playable. The player can also create their own players and simulate their NHL careers in Career mode, and may even create their own team and enter them into the NHL as either the 31st or 32nd slot, in the Franchise mode, complete with an authentic Expansion Draft experience. For the first time since NHL 2005, Canada and Germany are given fully licensed IIHF jerseys, with Canada being as part of an agreement with Hockey Canada as it also features a training camp sponsored by said governing body.

A downloadable update brought the Spengler Cup into NHL 18 as a playable tournament. Like the Champions Hockey League, this is the first time the Spengler Cup would be playable in an ice-hockey video game.

NHL 18 also revamped their ratings system, with the intention of bringing more parity between players of different skill levels. This is so that "better" players are considerably easier to play with than "worse" players. It was a common complaint among fans of the NHL series that in past games, most players played very similarly, if not exactly the same, in-game; this made any effort to build a great team in vain, as it took less effort to build a less skilled team and get similar results.

NHL 18 introduced a new Training Camp mode, sponsored by Hockey Canada, allowing users to learn the rules of hockey, and how to play the game through video tutorials. Tutorials include how to shoot; taking faceoffs; learning new dekes; playing defense; playing as a goalie; and several rules of hockey, including offside, icing, and penalties. The Training Camp videos are also available on the NHL 18 website, for both PlayStation 4 and Xbox One.

== Reception ==
NHL 2018

Aggregate score
Aggregator	Score
Metacritic	(XBOX) 77/100 (PS4) 75/100

Review scores
Publication	Score
Electronic Gaming Monthly	9/10
Game Informer	8/10
GameSpot	7/10
IGN	7.4/10
Polygon	6.5/10

NHL 18 received "generally favorable" reviews, according to review aggregator website Metacritic. In their 7/10 review, GameSpot wrote: "There's still a lot to love about NHL 18, even if the core on-ice experience has only seen minor tweaks... New players are sure to feel welcome, but for any series veterans, NHL 18 still has some room to improve." IGN gave the game a 7.4 out of 10, writing: "Those are positive strides, but the rest of the modes and features are starting to feel too familiar. If you're someone who's been following the NHL series for years, you aren't getting anything drastically new here to alter the balance or restore excitement."

New Game Network gave it 75% saying that "Not all of NHL 18's additions are equally successful, with the expanded depth of Franchise Mode overshadowing the flashy but unrewarding NHL Threes. The series continues to offer a good hockey simulation, and while the hardcore and those who play online will be satisfied, there's probably not enough here to make it worth the upgrade for casual fans of last year's edition."
