= NHL 2018 =

NHL 2018 may refer to:

- 2017–18 NHL season
- 2018–19 NHL season
- NHL 18, video game
- 2018 National Hurling League
