= NHL 2010 =

NHL 2010 may refer to:

- NHL 10, video game
- 2009–10 NHL season
- 2010–11 NHL season
- National Hurling League 2010
