= NHL 2013 =

NHL 2013 may refer to:

- 2012–13 NHL season
- 2013–14 NHL season
- NHL 13, video game
- 2013 National Hurling League
