= NHL 2002 =

2001 video game

- Cover art featuring Mario Lemieux
- Developers: EA Canada; Budcat Creations (GBA)
- Publisher: EA Sports
- Series: NHL series
- Platforms: PlayStation 2, Xbox, Windows, Game Boy Advance
- Release: September 18, 2001: Windows; NA: September 18, 2001; EU: October 5, 2001 PlayStation 2; NA: September 25, 2001; EU: October 19, 2001 Xbox; NA: December 11, 2001; EU: March 14, 2002 Game Boy Advance; NA: March 6, 2002
- Genre: Sports
- Modes: Single-player, multiplayer

NHL 2002 is a video game released by EA Sports in 2001. It is the predecessor to NHL 2003. The game's cover man is Pittsburgh Penguins superstar and owner Mario Lemieux, who had just made a comeback after being retired for three and a half years. It was the first installment of the NHL series to be released on Xbox.

NHL 2002 was the only game in the series to be released on the Game Boy Advance. This version is an updated port of NHL 96 for the SNES, and contains many features from that past title.

Bill Clement is replaced by Don Taylor for NHL 2002. Taylor's quirky and often slapstick commentary style drew mixed reception from fans of the game.

== Reception ==
Reception

Aggregate score
Aggregator	Score			
Aggregator	GBA	PC	PS2	Xbox
Metacritic	80/100	87/100	92/100	89/100

Review scores
Publication	Score			
Publication	GBA	PC	PS2	Xbox
Computer Gaming World	N/A	4/5	N/A	N/A
Electronic Gaming Monthly	N/A	N/A	8.83/10 (Note: Two critics of Electronic Gaming Monthly gave the PlayStation 2 version each a score of 9/10, and the other gave it 8.5/10.)	N/A
EP Daily	N/A	9.5/10	8.5/10	9/10
Eurogamer	N/A	N/A	N/A	7/10
Game Informer	N/A	N/A	9.5/10	9.25/10
GameRevolution	N/A	N/A	A−	A−
GameSpot	N/A	9.2/10	8.9/10	8.7/10
GameSpy	N/A	N/A	88%	N/A
IGN	7.9/10	9.2/10	9.2/10	9/10
Next Generation	N/A	N/A	4/5	4/5
Nintendo World Report	8/10	N/A	N/A	N/A
Official U.S. PlayStation Magazine	N/A	N/A	4.5/5	N/A
Official Xbox Magazine (US)	N/A	N/A	N/A	8.6/10
PC Gamer (US)	N/A	83%	N/A	N/A
BBC Sport	N/A	N/A	N/A	90%
Maxim	N/A	10/10	N/A	N/A

The PlayStation 2 version received "universal acclaim", while the rest of the console versions received "generally favorable reviews", according to the review aggregation website Metacritic. Jim Preston of NextGen's December 2001 issue said of the PS2 version, "Only frustrating defensive controls mar another brilliant effort from EA Sports." The magazine later said of the Xbox version in its final issue, "the only real issue we have is that the game's defensive AI is rather flawed, somewhat marring an otherwise incredible experience." In Japan, where the former console version was ported for release on February 7, 2002, Famitsu gave it a score of 29 out of 40.

Kevin Krause of GameZone gave the PS2 version 9.1 out of 10, calling it "A landmark release in that it is the first PS2 game to support Dolby™ Pro Logic and DTS™ sound. These surround sound technologies allow for realistic environmental surround sound like you've never heard it before." Kevin "Biff" Giacobbi gave the PC version 9 out of 10, calling it "A great game, but true hockey fans that buy the latest and greatest that EA gives us each year will not see a whole lot of changes." Christopher Allen of AllGame gave the same PC version three-and-a-half stars out of five, however, saying, "Despite the unwise decision to hire Don Taylor, NHL 2002 will appeal more to the arcade action camp than the purist. While most of the new additions don't work as well as planned, it is encouraging to see fresh ideas implemented. NHL 2002 is fun to play, but isn't particularly true to the sport, which may disturb true hockey fans with its slip away from realism." Will Abner of Computer Games Magazine gave the same PC version a similar score of three-and-a-half stars out of five, saying, "while some features are better, the most important part—the AI—has received little attention. While it's still a fun game, it's not much of an improvement over last year's edition."

Air Hendrix of GamePro said of the PlayStation 2 version, "While the PS2 competition from 989 Sports and Konami won't hit the ice until November at the earliest, NHL 2002 plays so well that it's this year's front-running favorite. If you're interested in hockey in the slightest, this is the game to buy." (Note: GamePro gave the PlayStation 2 version two 4.5/5 scores for graphics and sound, and two 5/5 scores for control and fun factor.) He later said of the Xbox version, "An excellent package of slick graphics and topnotch sound complete[s] NHL 2002's impressive outing." (Note: GamePro gave the Xbox version two 4/5 scores for graphics and sound, 4.5/5 for control, and 5/5 for fun factor.) He also said of the Game Boy Advance version, "If fast, playable hockey sounds appealing, you won't go wrong with NHL 2002." (Note: GamePro gave the Game Boy Advance version three 4/5 scores for graphics, control, and fun factor, and 3.5/5 for sound.)

The staff of Computer Games Magazine nominated the PC version as the best sports game of 2001, but ultimately gave the award to High Heat Major League Baseball 2002. The game was also nominated for the "Best Sports Game" (PC version) and "Best Sports, Traditional Game" (console versions) awards at GameSpot's Best and Worst of 2001 Awards, both of which went to FIFA 2002 and NBA 2K2, respectively. The PC version also received a nomination for the "PC Sports" award at the 5th Annual Interactive Achievement Awards, but ultimately lost to FIFA 2002. The game was also nominated at The Electric Playground's 2001 Blister Awards for "Best Sports Game for PC" and "Best Canadian Console Game of the Year", but lost both to High Heat Major League Baseball 2002 and NHL Hitz 2002.
