= NHL 20 =

2019 hockey video game

- Cover art featuring Auston Matthews of the Toronto Maple Leafs
- Developer: EA Vancouver
- Publisher: EA Sports
- Series: NHL
- Engine: Ignite
- Platforms: PlayStation 4 Xbox One
- Release: September 13, 2019
- Genre: Sports
- Modes: Single-player, multiplayer

NHL 20 is an ice hockey simulation video game developed by EA Vancouver and published by EA Sports. It was released globally on Xbox One and PlayStation 4 on September 13, 2019. It is the 29th installment in the NHL video game series and features Toronto Maple Leafs center Auston Matthews as the official and North American cover athlete, and would return as the cover athlete in NHL 22. Elias Pettersson of the Vancouver Canucks was named the cover athlete for the Swedish cover, and Patrik Laine of the Winnipeg Jets was named the Finnish cover athlete for the second year in a row. The online servers for the game were shut down on September 16, 2024.

== Features ==
NHL 20 introduces new game modes such as Squad Battles in Hockey Ultimate team. The game features a new commentary team of play-by-play man James Cybulski and Ray Ferraro as the main color commentator at ice level. The pair replace the NHL on NBC duo of Mike Emrick and Eddie Olczyk, whom Ferraro worked with on previous NHL video games. Consequently, the NHL on NBC graphics package and score bugs have been removed and replaced with a generic EA Sports graphics package and score bug. Cybulski and Ferraro will be joined by other celebrity guests (i.e., rapper Snoop Dogg) for certain games. Expansion Mode is also available, with the user adding a 32nd team to the league. Although the default team in this mode is named "Seattle 32nd Franchise" (to reflect the real-life Seattle Kraken that began play in 2021), any city and team name combination can be used, and the league will be realigned accordingly.

During the 2019 NHL Awards, EA announced that NHL 20 would be getting a new shooting engine powered by RPM to reflect signature shots of players such as P. K. Subban and Alexander Ovechkin. World of CHEL now has challenges, weekly in-game events and more.

== Reception ==
Reception

Aggregate score
Aggregator	Score
Metacritic	XONE: 85/100; PS4: 77/100

Review scores
Publication	Score
Game Informer	7.5/10
GameRevolution	7/10
GameSpot	9/10
GamesRadar+	4.5/5
Hardcore Gamer	3.5/5
IGN	7.9/10
Push Square	5/10
Shacknews	8/10
USgamer	3.5/5

NHL 20 received "generally favorable" reviews for the PS4 and Xbox One versions of the game, according to Metacritic.

=== Accolades ===
NHL 20 was nominated for "Sports Game of the Year" at the 23rd Annual D.I.C.E. Awards, and won the award for "Game, Franchise Sports" at the NAVGTR Awards.
