= NHL 19 =

2018 video game

- Cover art featuring P. K. Subban
- Developer: EA Vancouver
- Publisher: EA Sports
- Series: NHL
- Engine: Ignite
- Platforms: PlayStation 4 Xbox One
- Release: September 14, 2018
- Genre: Sports
- Modes: Single-player, multiplayer

NHL 19 is an ice hockey simulation video game developed by EA Vancouver and published by EA Sports. It was released on PlayStation 4 and Xbox One on September 14, 2018. It is the 28th installment in the NHL video game series and features Nashville Predators defenseman P. K. Subban on the cover, while the 'Ultimate' and 'Legends' game editions cover art features Wayne Gretzky from the Edmonton Oilers. The Finnish and Swedish exclusive covers feature Patrik Laine from Winnipeg Jets and William Nylander from Toronto Maple Leafs, respectively. The online servers for the game were shut down on November 7, 2023. This was the last year that the NHL on NBC graphics package and score bugs were in game.

== New features ==
NHL 19 included new game modes that allowed players to play on outdoor rinks, online. With new gameplay technology, EA Sports also announced that skating had more acceleration, action, speed, and responsiveness than in previous installments. NHL 19’s new feature “World of Chel” allows the player to explore various modes while maintaining the player's character progression. In the mode “Ones,” players face-off in a 1 v 1 v 1 game setting on a frozen pond. Capturing the action in a more realistic environment. A leveling system was also introduced in “World of Chel” which increases the players level while playing and unlocking boxes to gain more loot for their characters, World of Chel also has no microtransactions.

== Soundtrack ==
The soundtrack for the game features 20 songs from various artists, including Twenty One Pilots, Imagine Dragons, grandson, Greta Van Fleet, Panic! at the Disco, Parquet Courts, Canadian rockers Arkells, and Finnish rap-duo JVG.

== Reception ==
NHL 19

Aggregate score
Aggregator	Score
Metacritic	(PS4) 80/100 (XONE) 82/100

Review scores
Publication	Score
Game Informer	8.5/10
GameSpot	8/10
IGN	8.9/10
Forbes	8.2/10
Inside Hockey	5/5
USgamer	3.5/5

NHL 19 received "favorable" reviews from critics for both platforms, with a weighted average score of 80 out of 100, based on 29 critics, for PS4, and 82/100, based on 20 critics, for Xbox One, on review aggregator Metacritic. NHL 19’s extensive customization features was met with particular praise. The number of options creates many unique looks to use and personalized ways to play. Reviewers also shared positive opinions on the new Real player motion animation technology.

Despite the generally positive reception, there was also some criticism aimed at NHL 19. Editor Brian Mazique from Forbes stated in summary of his review: "On the downside, there is a lack of customization, some collision-detection issues, as well as some dated and less-than-impressive presentation elements."
