= John Buccigross =

American sportscaster

- Born: January 27, 1966 (age 60)
- Education: Heidelberg College
- Occupation: Sportscaster

John Buccigross (/ˈbuːtʃiɡrɒs/ BOO-chee-gros; born January 27, 1966) is an American sportscaster. He has been an anchor for ESPN since 1996. Buccigross is currently the play-by-play commentator for the NHL video game franchise from EA Sports.

== Biography ==
Buccigross was raised in Indiana, Pennsylvania, before moving to Steubenville, Ohio, at age 11. He played basketball at, and graduated from, Steubenville Catholic Central High School. Buccigross graduated from Heidelberg College where he majored in communications and theater arts.

=== Early career ===
Buccigross worked at a Cape Cod, Massachusetts, television station and at WPRI in Providence, Rhode Island.

=== ESPN ===
Buccigross' television duties include SportsCenter and Baseball Tonight. He formerly served as the lead host of the NHL 2Night (1998–2004) alongside analysts Barry Melrose, Ray Ferraro, and Darren Pang. He is currently a play-by-play commentator and studio host for the NHL on ESPN, play-by-play man for NCAA Division I men's ice hockey tournament games and is the lead host of their new weekly show, The Point, all with Melrose and Ferraro.

From 2001 to 2010, Buccigross authored a weekly NHL column for ESPN.com; he continues to contribute written pieces to the site periodically.

Beginning with the 2012 NHL Playoffs, Buccigross began hosting the #Bucciovertimechallenge on Twitter, asking users to guess the player (one for each team) who would score the game-winning goal for every overtime game throughout the course of the playoffs. Selected winners receive a branded item from his online store. As of the 2026 playoffs, the challenge is still active.

Despite initial reports to the contrary, Buccigross was not included in a mass layoff of on-air ESPN employees that included most of the network's hockey staff in April 2017; his contract was set to expire in the summer of that year.

==== Broadcasting style ====
Buccigross described himself in a 2006 column: "I'm 6-foot-4, 192 pounds. Mizuno MP33 irons. Big Run-DMC fan. Love chicken parm. Once played golf with Ray Bourque and tried to intentionally three putt from 30 feet so I could say I shot a 77 playing golf with Ray Bourque. Instead, the slippery downhill putt went in and I shot a 75 not playing golf with Brett Lindros." One of his catch-phrases is "nahmally good", which is a play on "normally good", and he refers to painful experiences by claiming, "Oh, Knights of Columbus that hurts!" Also, on occasion, he uses a Pittsburgh English or Pittsburghese accent, in his announcements of Pittsburgh sports. Another catch-phrase of Buccigross is associated with NBA star James Harden, exclaiming, "And a woo woo woo!" every time Harden scores a basket—a tip of the hat to Jeffrey Osborne's 1986 smash hit, "You Should Be Mine."

=== Book ===
Buccigross signed a book deal in the spring of 2006 with Middle Atlantic Press to write the life story of former NHL player and current NHL analyst Keith Jones. The book's title is Jonesy: Put Your Head Down And Skate. The Improbable NHL Career of Keith Jones. The book was released on October 2, 2007.

== Personal life ==
Buccigross married his wife Melissa in 1987; they divorced prior to March 2017. Buccigross and his ex-wife have three adult children: Brett, Malorie, and Jack. Buccigross has lived in South Windsor, Connecticut, where his son Jack played high school hockey.

In 2017, former ESPN analyst Adrienne Lawrence filed a lawsuit alleging that Buccigross sexually harassed her. In December 2019, the lawsuit was settled for undisclosed terms.

Buccigross is a member of the advisory board for You Can Play, a campaign dedicated to fighting homophobia in sports.

In 2026, it was announced that Buccigross, along with analyst Darren Pang, were introduced as the new play-by-play and color commentators for the EA Sports video game franchise, replacing James Cybulski and Cheryl Pounder, starting with NHL 27.
