= NHL 06 =

2005 video game

- North American cover art with Vincent Lecavalier
- Developer: EA Canada
- Publisher: EA Sports
- Series: NHL series
- Platforms: PlayStation 2, GameCube, Windows, Xbox
- Release: NA: September 6, 2005; EU: September 16, 2005; EU: September 23, 2005 (GC)
- Genre: Sports
- Modes: Single-player, multiplayer

NHL 06 is an ice hockey video game that was released in 2005. The PlayStation 2 version includes the Sega Genesis version of NHL '94.

== Reception ==
The game received "generally favorable reviews" on all platforms according to the review aggregation website Metacritic.

Reception

Aggregate score
Aggregator	Score			
Aggregator	GameCube	PC	PS2	Xbox
Metacritic	78/100	77/100	78/100	79/100

Review scores
Publication	Score			
Publication	GameCube	PC	PS2	Xbox
Electronic Gaming Monthly	7.33/10	N/A	7.33/10	7.33/10
Game Informer	7/10	N/A	7/10	7/10
GamePro	4/5	N/A	4/5	4/5
GameSpot	7.6/10	7.6/10	7.6/10	7.6/10
GameSpy	4/5	2.5/5	4.5/5	4.5/5
GameZone	N/A	N/A	8.8/10	8.4/10
IGN	8.5/10	8.5/10	8.5/10	8.5/10
Nintendo Power	8.5/10	N/A	N/A	N/A
Official U.S. PlayStation Magazine	N/A	N/A	3/5	N/A
Official Xbox Magazine (US)	N/A	N/A	N/A	8.8/10
PC Gamer (US)	N/A	80%	N/A	N/A
Maxim	7/10	7/10	7/10	7/10
