= NHL 98 =

1997 video game

- North American PlayStation cover art featuring Peter Forsberg
- Developers: EA Canada; Electronic Arts (SNES, Genesis); MBL Research (Saturn)
- Publishers: EA Sports; THQ (SNES, Genesis)
- Producer: Ken Sayler
- Composers: Jeff van Dyck (Windows); David Whittaker (Genesis)
- Series: NHL series
- Engine: Virtual Stadium
- Platforms: SNES, Sega Saturn, Microsoft Windows, PlayStation, Sega Genesis
- Release: September 24, 1997: Windows, PlayStation; NA: September 24, 1997; EU: October 1997 Genesis; NA: 1997 Super NES; NA: December 1997 Sega Saturn; NA: January 16, 1998; EU: January 23, 1998
- Genre: Sports (ice hockey)
- Modes: Single-player, multiplayer

NHL 98 is an ice hockey video game developed by EA Canada. It was released in 1997 and was the successor to NHL 97. It was the last installment of the NHL series to be released on the SNES, Sega Genesis, or Sega Saturn. It is based on the 1997-98 NHL season.

== Gameplay ==
A match in progress between Dallas Stars and Los Angeles Kings

NHL 98 took the NHL series ahead by introducing full national teams, although EA could not get the Nagano Olympic Tournament license due to lack of IIHF license, which Gremlin Interactive acquired. The Olympic hockey license itself was acquired by Midway Home Entertainment. Jim Hughson returns for play-by-play, this time joined by Daryl Reaugh, who provided color commentary. EA Sports also introduces 3Dfx Glide support for the first time in the NHL series. Despite his career ending injury, Vladimir Konstantinov was featured in the game. The Sega Saturn version also has Mario Lemieux in it. He retired at the end of the 1996–97 NHL season, yet was still included in the game.

== Development ==
During the planning stages of development, EA Sports consulted with Marc Crawford (then coach of the Stanley Cup-winning Colorado Avalanche) on how to improve the realism and strategy of the gameplay.

The Saturn version was developed by MBL Research.

== Reception ==
Reception

Review scores
Publication	Score
AllGame	4.5/5 (PC); 4/5 (GEN); 4/5 (PS); 3/5 (SAT)
Electronic Gaming Monthly	8.75/10 (PS1); 7.38/10 (SAT)
GameSpot	7.6/10 (PS1); 9.2/10 (WIN)
IGN	8/10 (PS1)
Next Generation	4/5 (PS1)
PlayStation: The Official Magazine	9/10
Sega Saturn Magazine	62% (SAT)

Award
Publication	Award
PSM	Starplayer

In the United States, the game's Windows version sold 134,714 copies during 1997. In Sweden, the PlayStation version of NHL 98 topped the retail sales chart published in the November 1997 issue of Super Play and ranked second in December. The Swedish rankings were compiled by Design Promotions using sales reports from video game retailers across the country. The game also ranked sixth on the magazine's American sales chart in December.

The PlayStation version met with resoundingly positive reviews, with critics hailing it as a return to dominance for the NHL series after the '96 PlayStation edition was cancelled and the '97 edition was average. John Ricciardi of Electronic Gaming Monthly went so far as to call it "the greatest hockey game ever made." While IGN and GamePro both cautioned that NHL 98 could not be called the best hockey of the year until NHL FaceOff 98 was complete, they assessed it as "[EA Sports'] best hockey title since its 16-bit glory days" and "a board-battering good time", respectively. Next Generation stated that "NHL '98 is a very good game and just that much better than the rest of the competition."

Reviews especially praised the advanced AI, fast gameplay, and the ability to change team strategies on the fly, without going to a pause menu. IGN pointed out that thanks to this last feature, "It only takes a little while for those who don't even care about strategy to experiment with new offenses and defenses that match their playing style. This changes the whole way hockey strategy is used." Glenn Rubenstein added in GameSpot, "Features like these make the game move faster than any other hockey title out there, and they also give the game a thrilling edge that others lack." Critics also praised the sound effects and the graphics, especially the player animations. While some criticized that the controls are a bit loose, most critics praised the controls, with Next Generation arguing that "since the players are on ice, EA's slippery control is actually quite accurate."

Later console versions received comparatively little attention. Lee Nutter of Sega Saturn Magazine and Dan Hsu of Electronic Gaming Monthly both razed the Saturn port as a slipshod conversion which lacks the elements that made the PlayStation and PC versions so highly regarded. They noted that the high resolution textures, translucent and reflective effects, scoreboard, names on jerseys, goal celebrations, and referee were all cut from the Saturn version, which nonetheless runs at a frame rate so choppy that it is almost unplayable. With his sole praise being for the play-by-play commentary and sound effects, Nutter dubbed the port "A shambling mockery of its former self" and recommended Saturn owners get NHL All-Star Hockey '98 instead. However, Hsu's three co-reviewers, while acknowledging the port's faults, still felt NHL 98 to be by far the best hockey game for the Saturn, and even Hsu said it was not nearly as bad as NHL All-Star Hockey '98.

NHL 98 was a runner-up for Computer Gaming World's 1997 "Sports Game of the Year" award, which ultimately went to Baseball Mogul and CART Precision Racing (tie). The editors called NHL 98 "the latest and best [...] in EA's awesome action-oriented" series.

During the AIAS' inaugural Interactive Achievement Awards, NHL 98 was a nominee for "PC Sports Game of the Year", which ultimately went to FIFA: Road to World Cup 98.

In 1998, PC Gamer declared it the 17th best computer game ever released, and the editors called it "quite simply the most entertaining sports game around".
