= NHL 21 =

- Standard edition cover art for all territories featuring Alexander Ovechkin
- Developer: EA Vancouver
- Publisher: EA Sports
- Series: NHL
- Engine: Ignite
- Platforms: PlayStation 4 Xbox One
- Release: October 16, 2020 (Note: EA Play members were able to play a 10-hour trial of the game beginning October 8, 2020. A special edition of the game, dubbed the "Great Eight Edition", was released on October 13.)
- Genre: Sports (ice hockey)
- Modes: Single-player, multiplayer

NHL 21 is an ice hockey simulation video game developed by EA Vancouver and published by EA Sports. It is the 30th installment in the NHL game series and was released for the PlayStation 4 and Xbox One consoles in October 2020. It is the last EA Sports title to run on the Ignite engine. The online servers were retired on October 6, 2025.

== Gameplay ==
The career mode for NHL 21, known as "Be a Pro", has been expanded to be more interactive and cinematic, similar to other franchises such as Madden NFL and NBA 2K. Players create their custom hockey player and choose to begin their career as a prospect in either the Canadian Hockey League or the Champions Hockey League, or choose to go undrafted and sign to a team of their choice as a free agent in the National Hockey League. Players are able to select their dialogue when speaking to their coach or the hockey press in media scrums. The dialogue options the player selects affects their likability among teammates, management, and their brand. The Be a Pro central hub has also been updated to match the revamped mode, allowing for the player to access all important aspects of their hockey player in one screen.

The multiplayer-based World of Chel umbrella mode includes four separate modes that were present in NHL 20; Ones, a three-way free-for-all mode; Threes Eliminator, an arcade-style 3v3 mode; Drop-ins, 3v3 or 6v6 matches composed of different individual players; and Clubs; 3v3 or 6v6 matches between clubs of players. A new progression system is introduced to World of Chel, which allows players to earn a rank in each of the four sub-modes separately. There are six ranks players can reach; Bronze, Silver, Gold, Platinum, Diamond, and Elite. The player's rank is reset at the end of each World of Chel season, and players are then given in-game rewards based on their ranks in each mode. The last few weeks of each season allows for clubs to participate in the Club Finals Championships, playing for a cup that corresponds to which division they are in; for example, a team in the highest division would play for the Elite Cup. Winners of cups are able to hang championship banners in their home arena and don championship patches on their jersey.

== Release ==
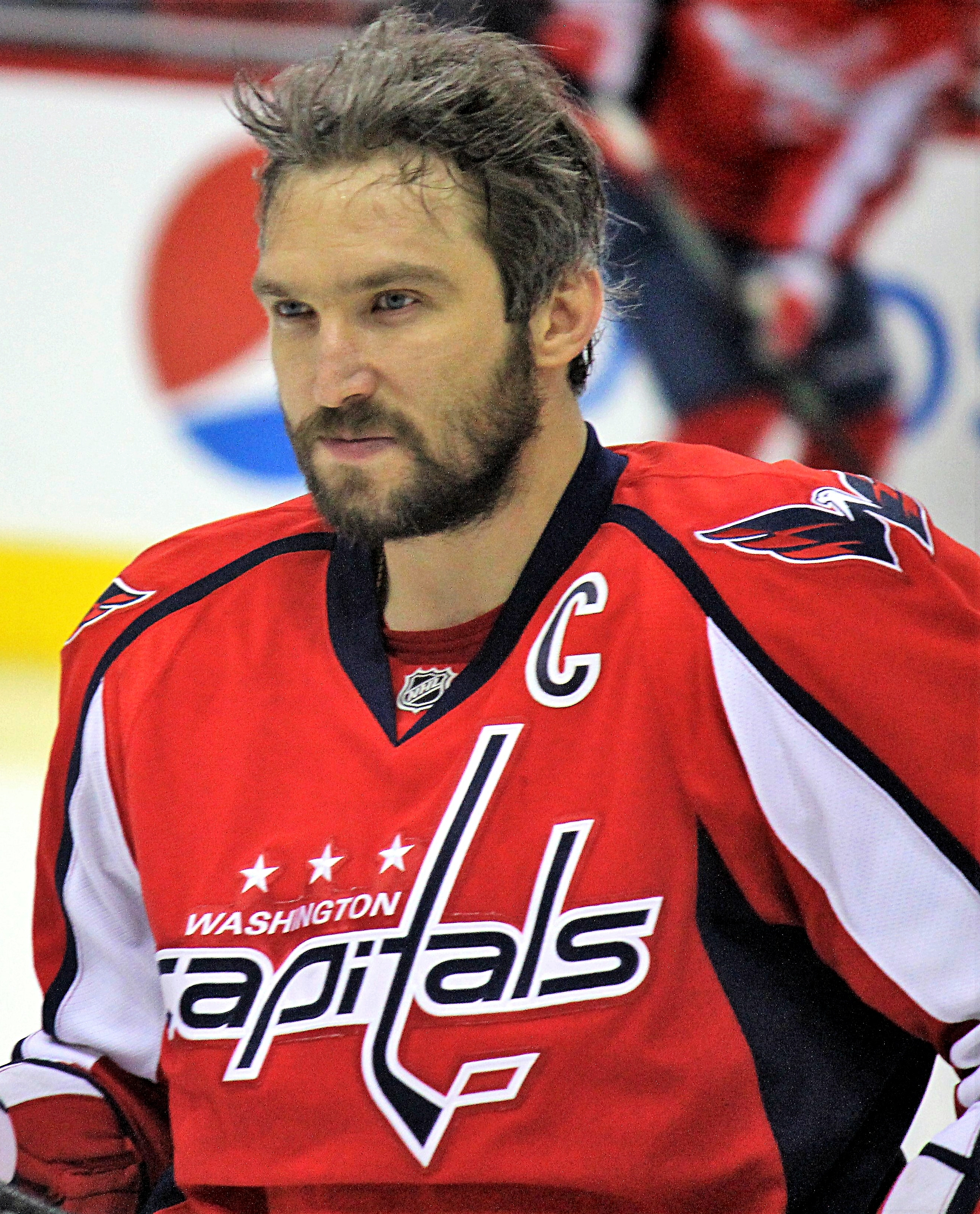
Alexander Ovechkin (pictured here in 2017) first appeared on the cover of an NHL game with NHL 07.

Due to the COVID-19 pandemic, both the reveal and release date for the game were pushed back. EA Vancouver offered a community update on the game's development on July 20, 2020. In the update, they confirmed the game's later-than-usual release date as well as a late August reveal event for the game. They also mentioned that the game would be released for the PlayStation 4 and Xbox One consoles only, but would be available to play on the PlayStation 5 and Xbox Series X/S through forward compatibility once those consoles are released in November 2020.

The game's reveal trailer was premiered on August 24, which also revealed its global cover athlete, Washington Capitals forward Alexander Ovechkin, who previously appeared on the cover art for NHL 07. Prior to the reveal event, EA Vancouver opened a registration for a private beta test that players could freely sign up for. The test was due to begin on August 28, but was postponed after some matches during the 2020 Stanley Cup playoffs were also postponed due to boycotts by players from both the NHL and NBA regarding ongoing police brutality. The test went live on August 31, and the World of Chel and Online Versus modes were made available for it. The test concluded at 12:00 a.m. PT on September 4.

Prior to the game's worldwide release, EA Play members were allowed to play a free 10-hour long trial version of the game, starting on October 8, 2020. NHL 21 released worldwide on October 16, 2020. Three pre-order tiers for it were made available for purchase prior to the release; a standard edition, deluxe edition, and ultimate edition dubbed the "Great Eight Edition" after Ovechkin's nickname. Each tier featured a certain amount of items such as Hockey Ultimate Team packs and World of Chel customization item bags, with different amounts of each item being offered with each tier. The Great Eight Edition also granted three days of early access gameplay.

== Reception ==
Reception

Aggregate scores
Aggregator	Score
Metacritic	81/100 (XBO); 72/100 (PS4)
OpenCritic	50% recommend

Review scores
Publication	Score
Game Informer	7.5/10
GameSpot	9/10
GamesRadar+	3.5/5
Hardcore Gamer	4/5
IGN	6/10
Push Square	7/10
USgamer	2.5/5

According to review aggregator website Metacritic, the PlayStation 4 version of NHL 21 received "mixed or average reviews" from critics, while the Xbox One version received "generally favorable reviews". Fellow review aggregator OpenCritic assessed that the game received fair approval, being recommended by 50% of critics.

IGN gave the game a 6.0/10, and wrote: "NHL 21 is at its best when I'm playing the wacky modes in World of Chel or the new HUT Rush where I can just go end-to-end while trying to pull off skill moves. The new Be A Pro additions are also significant and help to get that single-player experience more in line with other modern sports games. However, it's aggravating that during this whole console generation EA never managed to move past legacy issues like ping-pong passing, a lack of creativity in the offensive zone, and a narrow set of player ratings that make the gameplay feel stagnant." Game Informer gave it 7.5/10, saying the game looks and performs well but doesn't add anything new to the series, summarizing: "For now, NHL 21 gets the job done, especially if you want to play a fancier, flashier game."

== Notes and references ==
Notes
