= NHL 07 =

2006 video game

- Alexander Ovechkin on the cover of NHL 07
- Developers: EA Canada (X360, PSP); EA Montreal (PS2, Xbox, PC)
- Publisher: EA Sports
- Series: NHL series
- Platforms: Microsoft Windows; PlayStation 2 PlayStation Portable; Xbox; Xbox 360
- Release: NA: September 12, 2006; AU: September 21, 2006; EU: September 22, 2006; AU: October 20, 2006 (PSP)
- Genre: Sports
- Modes: Single-player, multiplayer

NHL 07 is an ice hockey video game, which was released in 2006. The game improved the series' gameplay with more realistic features, such as stickhandling and a wider variety of controller schemes. As NHL 07 was released on the Xbox 360, this is the first game in the NHL series to be released on a seventh generation console. It was also the last NHL game to be released on the Xbox and the only installment to be released on the PlayStation Portable.

== Gameplay ==
NHL 07 features 4 European leagues - Germany's Deutsche Eishockey Liga, Sweden's Elitserien, Finland's SM-liiga, and the Czech Republic's Tipsport Extraliga. NHL 07 for the Xbox 360 features analog stick control and a brand new physics system which eliminates the magnetic type possession of the puck which had been used in past NHL games. Commentary is provided by Gary Thorne and Bill Clement for the Xbox 360 version of the game, however, Jim Hughson and Craig Simpson return for the sixth generation and PSP versions.

== Reception ==
Reception

Aggregate score
Aggregator	Score				
Aggregator	PC	PS2	PSP	Xbox	Xbox 360
Metacritic	72/100	76/100	76/100	75/100	79/100

Review scores
Publication	Score				
Publication	PC	PS2	PSP	Xbox	Xbox 360
Electronic Gaming Monthly	N/A	N/A	N/A	N/A	7.83/10
Eurogamer	N/A	N/A	N/A	N/A	7/10
Game Informer	N/A	7.75/10	N/A	7.75/10	7.25/10
GamePro	N/A	N/A	N/A	N/A	4.5/5
GameRevolution	N/A	N/A	N/A	N/A	C
GameSpot	7.1/10	7.1/10	7.2/10	7.1/10	8.2/10
GameSpy	2/5	N/A	N/A	N/A	N/A
GameZone	N/A	8/10	8.2/10	8.1/10	9/10
IGN	8/10	8/10	7.9/10	8/10	8.7/10
Official U.S. PlayStation Magazine	N/A	8.5/10	N/A	N/A	N/A
Official Xbox Magazine (US)	N/A	N/A	N/A	8/10	8/10
PC Gamer (US)	68%	N/A	N/A	N/A	N/A
The A.V. Club	N/A	N/A	N/A	N/A	B
Detroit Free Press	N/A	N/A	N/A	N/A	3/4

The game received "generally favorable reviews" on all platforms except the PC version, which received "average" reviews, according to the review aggregation website Metacritic.

Metacritic gave NHL 07 a 79% rating, stating that "Stellar graphics and a great new stick/shooting system are the hallmarks of this title". NHL 07 received an 8.7 out of 10 from IGN, praising the new skill stick and improved puck physics system.
