= NHL 15 =

2014 video game

- The NHL 15 cover, featuring Patrice Bergeron
- Developer: EA Canada
- Publisher: EA Sports
- Series: NHL series
- Engine: Ignite
- Platforms: PlayStation 3; PlayStation 4; Xbox 360; Xbox One
- Release: NA: September 9, 2014; PAL: September 12, 2014
- Genre: Sports
- Modes: Single-player, multiplayer

NHL 15 is an ice hockey video game developed by EA Canada and published by EA Sports. It is the 24th installment of the NHL series and was released on September 9, 2014 in North America then three days later in Europe, Australia and New Zealand. The game serves as the debut entry in the series for eighth generation consoles, receiving releases on the PlayStation 4 and the Xbox One. The online servers for the game were shut down on June 6, 2022.

== Development ==
NHL 15 introduced integration of NHL on NBC presentation into the game across all modes in an effort to increase the game's realism, including on-air graphic elements across two networks, NBC and NBCSN, on PlayStation 4 and Xbox One, and as part of separate deals, the lead commentary team of Mike Emrick and Eddie Olczyk, with TSN analyst Ray Ferraro as an ice-level analyst. Full motion video of Emrick and Olczyk was also shot, allowing them to be digitally inserted into pre-game introduction scenes. Lead producer Sean Ramjagsingh explained that Ferraro was chosen in order to appeal to the Canadian audience, and because he lived near Vancouver—meaning that he could easily visit the EA Canada studios to record new dialogue reflecting events occurring during the NHL season. NBC had previously collaborated with EA in NHL 14, which offered a feature that selected teams playing in upcoming telecasts. The NHL on NBC score bug can be disappeared in order for players to be shown at the top of the screen, if necessary. The PS3 and Xbox 360 versions were based on NHL 14, which included NHL 94 Anniversary Mode.

== Gameplay ==
=== Playoff Mode ===
Playoff is a single player mode that allows the player to create a custom tournament bracket with up to 16 teams from the 12 leagues available in the game. The player can choose to play each game or simulate the outcome, all the while tracking the stats of their own team. Gameplay settings such as injuries and difficulty level can be customized.

=== Be a Pro ===
Be a Pro is similar to Playoff Mode, but puts the player in control of a single player of their own creation, gradually leveling up the skills of their player.

=== Be a GM ===
The player is the manager of the team, tasked with organizing the roster and the acquisition and trade of players.

=== Team Play ===
An online game mode in which players play teams compete against each other, with team members played by individual players.

== Soundtrack ==
In the PlayStation 4 and the Xbox One versions, the in game licensed soundtrack only plays in the in-game arenas, as well as the NHL on NBC theme during intros, intermissions, and outros, while the menu music was an original orchestral-rock score composed by Sonic Fuel (Joshua R. Mosley).

== Reception ==
Reception

Aggregate scores
Aggregator	Score
GameRankings	(PS4) 59% (XONE) 63.76%
Metacritic	(PS4) 60/100 (XONE) 59/100

Review scores
Publication	Score
Game Informer	5.5/10
GameRevolution	4/5
GameSpot	5/10
GamesRadar+	2.5/5
GameTrailers	5.8/10
IGN	7/10
Hardcore Gamer	2.5/5

The game received "mixed" reviews, according to video game review aggregator website Metacritic. GameSpot praised the gameplay and improved in-game physics and improved graphics, but expressed concern over the removal of many features compared to its predecessor, with IGN and other reviewers voicing similar concerns over the removal of gameplay features.
