= Don Taylor (sportscaster) =

Canadian television and radio sportscaster

Don Taylor (born September 25, 1959) is a Canadian radio sportscaster and former television sportscaster. He worked for TSN Radio 1040 in Vancouver until having his employment terminated on February 9, 2021, as part of the end of that station's sports radio format. On April 5, 2021, he and fellow sports broadcaster Rick Dhaliwal started hosting Donnie and Dhali - The Team on Victoria station CHEK-DT.

== Early life ==
Taylor grew up in Burnaby, British Columbia. He is the youngest of four brothers and two sisters.

== Sports broadcasting ==
Taylor was the longtime co-host of CKVU's nightly sports news show Sports Page from 1985 to 2000 and was also briefly a radio broadcaster with CKNW. He hosted Sportsnet Pacific's nightly sports news program Sportsnet Connected from 2001 up until August 8, 2014, when it was announced that Taylor would no longer work for Sportsnet.

In 2003, he returned to the radio on what was then called the TEAM 1040, co-hosting the Pratt & Taylor Show. When David Pratt and the station management could not come to an agreement for a new contract in 2011, Pratt left the station and Taylor's long-time friend and former CKVU co-worker, Barry Macdonald, became Pratt's replacement for the afternoon show. It would be known as the BMac & Taylor Show until 2015, when Bob "The Moj" Marjanovich was added to the show, which was called the BMac, Donnie and the Moj Show, from 2 p.m. to 6 p.m. on TSN 1040.

During his nearly three decades on television, Taylor was known for his canned delivery of the nightly sports highlights, which consisted largely of a set of recurring themes including:

1. Referring to obscure players or players with unusual names. For example, Taylor might refer to Brad Isbister as "The Isbisterian One".
  1. Similarly, Taylor might refer to a play by the same player as having been performed "in Isbisterian fashion."
  2. Taylor also facetiously inflates the esteem of groups of lesser-known players. For example, a line of players named Adams, Barrett and Carnegie might be referred to as the "dreaded Adams-Barrett-Carnegie line" when they score a goal.
2. Describing the colours of either the home or visiting teams jerseys in unusual levels of detail. For example, he might refer to the Anaheim Ducks as "wearing their home blacks with white and gold trim".
3. Associating current players of a particular jersey number with another player from the same team who wore the same number during an earlier era. For example, Taylor might refer to former Vancouver Canucks goaltender Jacob Markström as "wearing Richard Brodeur's old number 35" or former Vancouver Canucks defenceman Kevin Bieksa as "wearing Doug Bodger's old number 3". The trivia is typically related to long-retired players or little-known players, especially with a Canadian or west coast connection.
4. Associating a play in terms of particular qualities of an obscure or long-forgotten player, especially for goaltenders. For example, Taylor might describe a goaltender's performance as being "like a modern-day Gerry Cheevers".
5. Taylor is also known for his lacking, yet recognizable, imitation of Jerry Lewis's babbling when describing frantic plays (usually in front of the net in hockey).
6. Remarking, "the mesh ripples" or "top shelf where mom keeps the peanut butter" when a goal is scored.
7. Describing a goaltender as having saved the puck, "in rapier-like fashion" or "it was a scintillating save", in honour of legendary Montreal Canadiens broadcaster Danny Gallivan.
8. He will also mimic the voice of former Maple Leaf Gardens public address announcer Paul Morris.
9. Referring to Canadian sportscasters Jim Van Horne's moustache and Hazel Mae as imaginary referees in deciding the victor of a hockey fight
10. During basketball highlights, Taylor often imitated Marv Albert's signatures "Yes!" "and it was a gorgeous move!"

Taylor also provided colour commentary for different hockey video games, including NHL 2002, NHL 2003, as well as NHL Rock the Rink, all of which were released by EA Sports.

== Personal life ==
Taylor and his wife Lisa (a high school teacher) have three children. Lisa is a former All-American heptathlete at Simon Fraser University. They are Roman Catholic.

In March 2014, Taylor wrote an article on Sportsnet's website about his late older brother Dave Taylor, who died of cancer at age 62. Taylor dedicated his moustache to his late brother.
