= NHL 11 =

2010 video game

- North American cover art featuring Jonathan Toews
- Developer: EA Canada
- Publisher: EA Sports
- Series: NHL series
- Platforms: PlayStation 3; Xbox 360
- Release: NA: September 7, 2010; AU: September 16, 2010; EU: September 17, 2010
- Genre: Sports
- Modes: Single-player, multiplayer

NHL 11 is an ice hockey video game, which celebrated the twentieth anniversary of the NHL series. The game was developed by EA Canada, published by EA Sports, and released in North America on September 7, 2010, with the game releasing in all other regions within two weeks. The game features a physics-based game engine, which replaced the old animation-based system, and was touted by NHL 11 producer, Sean Ramjagsingh, as "the biggest change in NHL 11". Other significant changes include broken sticks, which means the stick will now occasionally break when the player shoots. NHL 11 does not use official International Ice Hockey Federation jerseys, as the game doesn't have the IIHF license. The cover of NHL 11 features Chicago Blackhawks captain Jonathan Toews, who helped the team win their first Stanley Cup title in 49 years in 2010. NHL 11 was the last game to feature the Atlanta Thrashers as they became the present-day Winnipeg Jets the next year in 2011.

== Gameplay ==
As an ice hockey simulation, the game attempts to emulate the rules and play of the sport as closely as possible. Goals, for example, may be scored from all areas of the ice through a variety of different methods, mirroring play of an ice hockey game in real life. The default control scheme uses the left analog stick to control player movement, while the right stick is used to simulate the movement of the player's hockey stick, performing actions such as dekeing and shooting. Players may choose to use simpler input methods instead, such as the control scheme used in NHL '94, in which pass and shoot are the only buttons.

A physics-based game engine replaced the old animation-based system. Touted as "the biggest change in NHL 11" by producer Sean Ramjagsingh, it took a full year to develop and implement. The new engine allows for more natural plays and puck bounces, and simulates real interactions more accurately and realistically. Each bodycheck and collision is unique, such as glancing blows that spin a player, hip checks that completely upend opponents, or any other possible reactions. Player and puck movement now take momentum into account, and hits can be made high or low, with vastly different results.

NHL 11 introduces broken sticks to the NHL series.

Broken sticks were introduced to the series for the first time, as EA claims this was the most requested feature. Players without sticks are able to kick or grab the puck, and teammates may offer their own stick as a replacement. Alternatively, the player may return to the bench for another stick. Discarded sticks remain "live" objects while on the ice; the new physics system allows interaction with skates, other sticks, and the puck. The face-off system was completely overhauled after several years without improvements. Previously, a simple flick of the analog stick at the correct time would win faceoffs. NHL 11 allows players to choose position and grip, tie up opponents or lift their sticks, shoot off the draw, or even immediately deke through the opposing centre's legs.

Other mechanics were reworked in this iteration of the series. Passes are now triggered at the release of the trigger button, instead of the initial pull. The longer the button is held, the stronger the pass will be, giving the player control of the speed of the puck. Dekes are done using the controller's analog stick. There are four different types of dekes that can be made, corresponding to up, down, left, and right on the analog stick. The left and right dekes were retained from previous games but made quicker. The up deke has the player flip the puck up and jump over a prone player, and the down deke has the player put the puck in his feet and kick it back up to his stick. Each of the dekes was made to counter a specific defensive technique. Completely new additions to the game include user-controlled goal celebrations, disallowed goals, playoff beards, and "hustle", a burst of speed that drains stamina quickly.

=== Modes ===
NHL 11 features a new "Hockey Ultimate Team" (HUT) mode, similar to the corresponding modes in the FIFA series and the Madden NFL series which existed before NHL 11. In Hockey Ultimate Team, the players receive a pack of cards and use them to build up their own team and make it the best they can. The players will earn "EA Pucks" after each game they've played in the HUT mode, whether they win or lose. They can also choose to play online with another player or play alone with the computer.

New additions in the "Be a GM" (general manager) mode include restricted free agency, including qualifying offers, offer sheets and compensation draft picks; six seasons worth of draft picks available for trades and as RFA compensation (rather than only one season's worth of picks available in the previous games); a revamped "Rookie Generation" system; all-new pre-season games to help the players decide their NHL team; and the ability to trade up to five players/picks, instead of just three.

== Development and marketing ==
On May 3, 2010, an FAQ was released on the EA Sports website regarding questions users may have asked regarding the gameplay of the game, before the game was released.

On June 21, 2010, Jonathan Toews of the Chicago Blackhawks was announced as the cover athlete for NHL 11 in North America, marking the first time teammates were selected in consecutive years. (Chicago winger Patrick Kane was the cover athlete for NHL 10 in North America.) Toews won a gold medal at the 2010 Winter Olympics and the Conn Smythe Trophy as the playoff MVP. He captained the Blackhawks to their first Stanley Cup win since 1961, all in 2010. Identical twins Henrik and Daniel Sedin of the Vancouver Canucks were announced as the cover athletes for the Swedish cover of NHL 11, while Mark Streit was featured on the Swiss cover for the third consecutive year. A launch event was held in New York City on September 8, 2010, with Jonathan Toews and Patrick Kane participating in a trick-shot competition and a match of NHL 11, in which Kane knocked Toews out in a virtual fight.

On January 11, 2013, all online services for NHL 11 were discontinued.

== Reception ==
Reception

Aggregate score
| Aggregator | Score | |
| Aggregator | PS3 | Xbox 360 |
|---|---|---|
| Metacritic | 88/100 | 88/100 |

Review scores
| Publication | Score | |
| Publication | PS3 | Xbox 360 |
|---|---|---|
| 1Up.com | B+ | B+ |
| Destructoid | N/A | 9.5/10 |
| Game Informer | 9/10 | 9/10 |
| GameRevolution | A− | A− |
| GameSpot | 9/10 | 9/10 |
| GameTrailers | 9.2/10 | 9.2/10 |
| GameZone | 9/10 | 9/10 |
| IGN | 8.5/10 | 8.5/10 |
| Official Xbox Magazine (US) | N/A | 9/10 |
| PlayStation: The Official Magazine | 8/10 | N/A |

NHL 11 received "generally favorable reviews" on both platforms according to the review aggregation website Metacritic. NHL 11 was the fourth best-selling title for September 2010 in the United States, and opened as the 18th best-ranked title in the United Kingdom in its first week of release. Cowen and Company's, Doug Creutz, said it had a "weak follow-through" as it did not chart on the top 10 list the following month.

The new physics-based gameplay was well received, with Game Informer describing it as "steady progress" over previous games, and IGN noting it "isn't perfect... but when it works properly the results can be awesome". IGN also noted that the general speed of the game as being slower than NHL 10.

The game's artificial intelligence received mixed reviews. 1UP.com took issue with the offensive AI, criticizing teammates who do not join the puck carrier on a breakaway, yet remarking that they show "flashes of brilliance in the defensive zone. GameSpot mentioned that the AI had been "noticeably ramped up", with "smart teammates" and "players [who] seem to know what they're doing", while lamenting the fact that "computer players still hold onto the puck a little too long".

During the 14th Annual Interactive Achievement Awards, the Academy of Interactive Arts & Sciences nominated NHL 11 for "Sports Game of the Year".

== See also ==
- NHL Slapshot, an ice hockey video game by EA Sports that was released for the Wii
- NHL 2K11, an ice hockey video game for the Wii and iOS, developed by Visual Concepts
