= NHL 2004 =

2003 video game

- Cover art with Dany Heatley
- Developer: EA Black Box
- Publisher: EA Sports
- Series: NHL series
- Platforms: GameCube, PlayStation 2, Xbox, Windows
- Release: NA: September 23, 2003; EU: October 3, 2003; AU: October 10, 2003
- Genre: Sports
- Modes: Single-player, multiplayer

NHL 2004 is an ice hockey sports video game developed by EA Black Box. It is the successor to NHL 2003. The game adds three European Elite Leagues: Germany's Deutsche Eishockey Liga (DEL), Sweden's Elitserien (SEL), and Finland's SM-liiga. The game was heavily modded during the last 20 years.

== Gameplay ==
The game included many improvements to its gameplay (more realistic puck and rebound control and better checking) and game modes (a completely reworked franchise mode renamed "Dynasty"). In addition to the gameplay improvements, one particular non-gameplay improvement was added. When a team wins the Stanley Cup Final, a large-scale celebration ensues. It included players skating around the ice holding the Cup over their heads. This then led to the common snapshot of the team and the coaches that holds true in the NHL. A "secret" song ("Shatterday" by Vendetta Red) plays while the animation shows the stats of the players in the picture, ending with the captain. Because of these additions, it was praised as one of the best games in the series to date.

== Reception ==
Reception

Aggregate score
Aggregator	Score			
Aggregator	GameCube	PC	PS2	Xbox
Metacritic	85/100	87/100	85/100	85/100

Review scores
Publication	Score			
Publication	GameCube	PC	PS2	Xbox
Electronic Gaming Monthly	7.33/10	N/A	7.33/10	7.33/10
Game Informer	9/10	N/A	9.25/10	9/10
GamePro	4/5	N/A	4/5	4/5
GameRevolution	B+	N/A	B+	B+
GameSpot	8.6/10	8.8/10	8.8/10	8.6/10
GameSpy	4/5	4.5/5	4/5	4/5
GameZone	N/A	N/A	N/A	8.9/10
IGN	8.8/10	8.8/10	8.8/10	8.8/10
Nintendo Power	3.8/5	N/A	N/A	N/A
Official U.S. PlayStation Magazine	N/A	N/A	4/5	N/A
Official Xbox Magazine (US)	N/A	N/A	N/A	8.6/10
PC Gamer (US)	N/A	67%	N/A	N/A
Playboy	88%	88%	88%	88%

The game received "favorable" reviews on all platforms according to the review aggregation website Metacritic.
