= NHL 2003 =

2002 video game

- North American PS2 box art with Jarome Iginla
- Developer: EA Canada
- Publisher: EA Sports
- Series: NHL series
- Platforms: PlayStation 2, Xbox, GameCube, Windows
- Release: October 3, 2002: GameCube, Windows; NA: October 3, 2002; AU: October 4, 2002 (PC); AU: October 21, 2002 (GC); EU: October 25, 2002 PlayStation 2; NA: October 3, 2002; AU: October 14, 2002; EU: October 18, 2002 Xbox; NA: October 8, 2002; EU: October 25, 2002; AU: November 1, 2002
- Genre: Sports
- Modes: Single-player, multiplayer

NHL 2003 is an ice hockey video game developed by EA Canada and published by EA Sports. It was released in 2002 as the successor to NHL 2002. Jarome Iginla appears as the cover athlete and spokesperson of the game. Iginla appears in the Behind The Scenes video to show the player how the game was made. It was the first installment of the NHL series to be released on GameCube.

== Gameplay ==
NHL 2003 introduced a new feature: the GameBreaker. It is activated once a player performs enough "dekes" and it is used to help change the momentum of the game, such as scoring a big goal, delivering a big hit or winning a big fight.

The commentary in NHL 2003 is voiced by Jim Hughson and Don Taylor. Hughson has been the NHL series announcer since NHL '97, while Taylor first appeared in the previous year's version.

== Reception ==
Reception

Aggregate score
Aggregator	Score			
Aggregator	GameCube	PC	PS2	Xbox
Metacritic	79/100	75/100	79/100	80/100

Review scores
Publication	Score			
Publication	GameCube	PC	PS2	Xbox
Electronic Gaming Monthly	N/A	N/A	7.5/10	N/A
Eurogamer	N/A	N/A	8/10	N/A
Game Informer	N/A	N/A	7.75/10	7.75/10
GamePro	4.5/5	N/A	4.5/5	4.5/5
GameSpot	8.2/10	8.4/10	8.3/10	8.3/10
GameSpy	4/5	3.5/5	4/5	N/A
GameZone	8.5/10	9.1/10	9/10	9/10
IGN	8.7/10	8.8/10	8.6/10	8.7/10
Nintendo Power	3.5/5	N/A	N/A	N/A
Official U.S. PlayStation Magazine	N/A	N/A	3.5/5	N/A
Official Xbox Magazine (US)	N/A	N/A	N/A	7.9/10
PC Gamer (US)	N/A	72%	N/A	N/A
BBC Sport	N/A	N/A	90%	N/A

The game received "generally favorable reviews" on all platforms according to the review aggregation website Metacritic.
