= NHL 2000 =

1999 video game

- Cover art featuring Chris Pronger of the St. Louis Blues
- Developers: EA Canada; Tiertex Design Studios (GBC)
- Publisher: EA Sports
- Producer: Kevin Wilkinson
- Series: NHL series
- Platforms: Game Boy Color, PlayStation, Windows
- Release: Windows: NA: September 15, 1999; UK: September 24, 1999; PlayStation: NA: September 22, 1999; EU: 1999; Game Boy Color: NA: December 20, 1999; UK: April 7, 2000
- Genre: Sports
- Modes: Single-player, multiplayer

NHL 2000 is an ice hockey video game developed by Electronic Arts Canada. It was released in 1999 and was the successor to NHL 99.

== Gameplay ==
A season mode (later developed into a Franchise mode) with a retirement feature, drafting, and player trades were added to the series in this game, as well as the ability to use any photo for created players' faces, which is textured onto the head. Similar gameplay was used in this version, as well as the previous version, NHL 99.

Another mode in NHL 2000 is the Tournament mode, in which the user chooses 16 countries (only 18 countries were available in the game) to play a round robin. After the round robin, eight teams are eliminated and then the remaining eight have a "playoff," but instead of it being out of seven games it was single-elimination. Eventually, a winner is crowned gold in the championship match. There is also a third place match for the losers of the semi-finals.

The game has a total of 28 NHL teams, including the new expansion Atlanta Thrashers, which was the only team in the game that did not exist in the 1998–99 season. Online leagues of the game also became more organized.

Daryl Reaugh left the series as colour commentator in this game and was replaced by Bill Clement. Jim Hughson remained as play-by-play announcer throughout the series.

== Reception ==
Reception

Aggregate score
Aggregator	Score		
Aggregator	GBC	PC	PS
GameRankings	61%	82%	84%

Review scores
Publication	Score		
Publication	GBC	PC	PS
AllGame	2/5	4/5	3.5/5
CNET Gamecenter	N/A	9/10	8/10
Computer Gaming World	N/A	3.5/5	N/A
Electronic Gaming Monthly	N/A	N/A	8.75/10
Game Informer	N/A	N/A	8.5/10
GameFan	N/A	N/A	75%
GameRevolution	N/A	B	B
GameSpot	4.4/10	9/10	9.2/10
GameSpy	N/A	86%	N/A
IGN	5/10	8.2/10	9.1/10
Next Generation	N/A	N/A	5/5
Official U.S. PlayStation Magazine	N/A	N/A	4/5
PC Accelerator	N/A	8/10	N/A
PC Gamer (US)	N/A	89%	N/A
USA Today	N/A	N/A	4/4

The PlayStation and PC versions received "favorable" reviews, while the Game Boy Color version received "mixed" reviews, according to the review aggregation website GameRankings. Jim Preston of NextGen said of the PlayStation version, "EA Sports once again proves it does hockey better than anyone else on the planet."

Nash Werner of GamePro said of the PC version that "it's easy to overlook the flaws when everything else fits like a glove. If you're a fan of NHL '99, you'll love NHL 2K [sic]. It was worth the wait." (Note: GamePro gave the PC version two 4.5/5 scores for graphics and overall fun factor, 4/5 for sound, and 5/5 for control.) William Abner of Computer Games Strategy Plus gave the same PC version three stars out of five, saying, "In the end, NHL 2000 is more of a side step than it is a leap forward. While the super goalie problem is gone and the online play is compelling, the AI problems mar the solo game to the point that in order to have a good time you must put limitations on yourself so as to not destroy the computer opponent at will. And that's just not much fun."

PC Gamer US nominated the PC version for their 1999 "Best Sports Game" award, which ultimately went to High Heat Baseball 2000. The staff wrote of the game, "Arcade-style hockey just doesn't get any better." It was also a finalist for the Academy of Interactive Arts & Sciences' 1999 "Computer Sports Game of the Year" award, which ultimately went to FIFA 2000. The game was named the best sports game of 1999 by CNET Gamecenter.

Said PC version alone sold 97,219 units in the US by April 2000.
