= NHL 23 =

- Cover art for eighth-generation consoles, featuring Trevor Zegras (left) and Sarah Nurse (right)
- Developer: EA Vancouver
- Publisher: EA Sports
- Series: NHL
- Engine: Frostbite 3
- Platforms: PlayStation 4 PlayStation 5 Xbox One; Xbox Series X/S
- Release: October 14, 2022
- Genre: Sports (ice hockey)
- Modes: Single-player, multiplayer

NHL 23 is an ice hockey simulation video game developed by EA Vancouver and published by EA Sports. It is the 32nd installment in the NHL video game series and was released for the PlayStation 4, PlayStation 5, Xbox One and Xbox Series X/S on October 14, 2022.

The online servers for the game were shut down on August 31, 2026.

== Features ==
NHL 23 features "The Zegras", a variant of the lacrosse-style goal, also known as the Michigan goal, performed by Trevor Zegras and Sonny Milano. A player from behind the net hits the puck up above the crossbar and another player in front of the net hits the puck into the goal.

NHL 23 also features the new "Last Chance Puck Movement", a move that allows the player to hit the puck with their stick even if they have been hit or tripped.

NHL 23's "Deep Dive" unveiled new animations, such as new hat tricks, national anthem animations, on-ice projection, a new overtime win animation, Stanley Cup Playoffs animations, interactive Stanley Cup celebrations, along with many other features. Another round of the "Deep Dive" was announced that EA added a custom league option, where one can play as the Original Six, and have the ability to add a round robin used in the 2020 Stanley Cup playoffs.

Along with many other requested features, same-gen crossplay is available.

== Soundtrack ==
The NHL 23 soundtrack was revealed on October 3, 2022. EA promoted the soundtrack as one of the heaviest in the NHL series, featuring artists such as A Day to Remember, Ghost, Gojira, Korn, Muse, Turnstile and Wage War. Artists also returned from previous NHL soundtracks, such as Coheed and Cambria, Mod Sun, Motionless in White, Panic! at the Disco, PUP, Shinedown, Yungblud and many more. The soundtrack for NHL 23 features a total of 42 songs.

== Reception ==
Reception

Aggregate score
Aggregator	Score
Metacritic	(PS5) 71/100 (XSXS) 71/100

Review scores
Publication	Score
GamesRadar+	3.5/5
Hardcore Gamer	3/5
IGN	8/10
Push Square	5/10
Shacknews	6/10

NHL 23 received "mixed or below average" reviews, according to review aggregator website Metacritic.
