= NHL 2005 =

2004 video game

- North American cover art with Markus Näslund. The Finnish release featured Olli Jokinen.
- Developer: EA Black Box
- Publisher: EA Sports
- Series: NHL series
- Platforms: Windows, PlayStation 2, GameCube, Xbox
- Release: Windows: NA: September 14, 2004; PAL: September 17, 2004; GameCube, PS2, Xbox: AU: September 17, 2004 (GC, Xbox); NA: September 22, 2004; EU: September 24, 2004 (Xbox); AU: October 1, 2004 (PS2); EU: October 8, 2004 (GC, PS2)
- Genre: Sports
- Modes: Single-player, multiplayer

NHL 2005 is an ice hockey video game released in 2004, the successor to NHL 2004.

== Gameplay ==
NHL 2005 features Open Ice Control, including moving players without the puck and also a complete World Cup mode where each team can be created from scratch. The user was now allowed to import digitized home arenas for the scratchbuilt teams (the 30 NHL arenas plus Nuremberg Arena, Kölnarena, Stockholm Globe Arena, Helsinki Hartwall Areena and Prague Sazka Arena were available). Additional NHL jerseys and logos were also available including those of the defunct Atlanta Flames, Winnipeg Jets, Colorado Rockies (NHL), Quebec Nordiques as well as the old style Los Angeles Kings, Washington Capitals and Vancouver Canucks uniforms of the 1970s and the 1980s.

The IIHF license which granted the World Cup mode also allowed EA to use real-life international jerseys for the only time (previously released games used unique jerseys designed by the game's staff which only bore a passing similarity to their real life counterparts, so the jersey shows their flag.) The PC version of the game was stripped down to the bare essentials, including the omitting of the create-a-player feature. These omissions were possibly due to the labour dispute that had cancelled the season, but EA explained that they had not perfected the new create-a-player interface, which would have allowed for far greater customizability than what was previously available.

On 1 October, 2006, the online servers for both the PS2 and Xbox versions were shut down. Despite this, The Xbox version of NHL 2005 is now playable online with Insignia, a revival server restoring online functionality to Xbox games.

== Reception ==
Reception

Aggregate score
Aggregator	Score			
Aggregator	GameCube	PC	PS2	Xbox
Metacritic	75/100	66/100	75/100	77/100

Review scores
Publication	Score			
Publication	GameCube	PC	PS2	Xbox
Electronic Gaming Monthly	6.33/10	N/A	6.33/10	6.33/10
Eurogamer	N/A	N/A	N/A	6/10
Game Informer	8.5/10	N/A	8.5/10	8.5/10
GamePro	N/A	N/A	4/5	4/5
GameRevolution	B	N/A	B	B
GameSpot	7.9/10	7.9/10	7.9/10	7.9/10
GameSpy	3.5/5	1.5/5	4/5	4/5
GameZone	8.4/10	N/A	8.8/10	8.3/10
IGN	8.3/10	8.3/10	8.3/10	8.3/10
Nintendo Power	3.7/5	N/A	N/A	N/A
Official U.S. PlayStation Magazine	N/A	N/A	3.5/5	N/A
Official Xbox Magazine (US)	N/A	N/A	N/A	8.5/10
PC Gamer (US)	N/A	64%	N/A	N/A

The game received "generally favorable reviews" on all platforms except the PC version, which received "average" reviews, according to the review aggregation website Metacritic.
