= NHL 97 =

1996 video game

- Cover art featuring John Vanbiesbrouck
- Developers: High Score Entertainment (Genesis); Ceris Software (SNES); EA Canada (PC); Visual Concepts (PS, Saturn)
- Publishers: EA Sports; Black Pearl Software (SNES)
- Composers: Mark Chosak; David Whittaker (Genesis); Jeff van Dyck (Windows)
- Series: NHL
- Engine: Virtual Stadium
- Platforms: MS-DOS, Windows, Super NES, PlayStation, Sega Saturn, Genesis/Mega Drive
- Release: September 27, 1996: MS-DOS, Windows; NA: September 27, 1996 Super NES; NA: October 15, 1996; EU: November 28, 1996 Genesis/Mega Drive; NA: October 1996; EU: 1996 PlayStation; NA: November 11, 1996; EU: November 1, 1996 Saturn; NA: December 4, 1996; EU: December 6, 1996
- Genre: Sports (ice hockey)
- Modes: Single-player, multiplayer

NHL 97 is an ice hockey video game by EA Sports. It was released in 1996 and was the successor to NHL 96. It is the sixth installment of the NHL series and the first to be released on both PlayStation and Sega Saturn. A Panasonic M2 version was in development and slated to be one of the launch titles for it, but never happened due to the cancellation of the system.

The cover of the game features goaltender John Vanbiesbrouck, who played for the Florida Panthers between 1993 and 1998. NHL 97 was the last game of the NHL series to feature a goaltender on the cover until Martin Brodeur was chosen for the cover of NHL 14.

== Gameplay ==
NHL 97 uses a full 3D engine, with motion captured polygonal players (PC/PlayStation/Sega Saturn versions only, the Genesis and SNES versions retained similar graphical values to previous games, but with further enhanced animations). Each goaltender has his own custom-painted mask and the original artwork can be seen inside the game with a special "Goalie Mask Viewer". NHL 97 also introduces play-by-play commentary, provided by well-known announcer Jim Hughson.

For the first time since EA Hockey, national teams were added, but only Canada, the United States, and Russia have their own teams while the other two are selections of the best European players. NHL 97 introduced a skills competition, allowing the user to pick players to compete in drills such as hardest shot, goalie 2 on 0, and accuracy shooting.

This was the first year that an alternate jersey was an option. Teams that have third jerseys for NHL 97 are the Mighty Ducks of Anaheim, Boston Bruins, Los Angeles Kings, Pittsburgh Penguins, St. Louis Blues, Tampa Bay Lightning and Vancouver Canucks.

In addition, each team in the game has one player with a special skill. Examples are Joe Sakic's (Colorado Avalanche) "wrong-footed wrist shot" and Rob Ray's (Buffalo Sabres) ability to check an opposing player while still controlling the puck. A glitch allows players to score 100% of the time when shooting down by taking a shot against the boards at the hash marks of the left circle in the bottom zone.

There is an option to enable or disable fighting, though certain players will not get into fights.

Along with the PC, Genesis and SNES versions, both the Saturn and PlayStation versions made their debut. The shot speed in the PlayStation and Saturn versions is so slow that some skaters can beat a slapshot down the ice.

== Reception ==
Reception

Review scores
Publication	Score
AllGame	3.5/5 (PS); 3.5/5 (SAT)
Electronic Gaming Monthly	8.75/10 (PS)
GameSpot	7.2/10 (PS); 8.7/10 (PC)
Next Generation	4/5 (GEN, PC); 3/5 (PS)
Sega Saturn Magazine	84% (SAT)

According to market research firm PC Data, the Windows version of NHL 97 was the 20th best-selling computer game of 1996 in the United States.

The game received favorable reviews. Next Generation gave the Genesis version a rave review, saying it retained the familiar classic feel of the series while improving the AI and adding new special moves, fixes, and features. The reviewer firmly denied that a Genesis version of the game was obsolete: "Even with all the enhancements this game has undergone on 32-bit systems, the feel of a humble Genesis pad controlling all-out NHL action is unsurpassed." Air Hendrix of GamePro was also enthusiastic, saying the game "attains a new pinnacle of hockey action. On the surface, the game seems very familiar, but NHL '97's killer new features build added depth into the game." He praised the inclusion of extra teams, the new special moves, and both the old and new animations, and said the new Skill Challenge and Practice modes "really help you improve your game, but more importantly, they inject the game with another layer of raucous, competitive, Open Ice-style fun."

GamePro's Major Mike was less impressed by the Super NES version, commenting that "instead of supplying sharp new features as the Genesis version did, this NHL '97 is almost identical to last year's fine offering. It has the same gameplay engine and options; the only real change is in the updated rosters."

Reviews for the PlayStation version were also more mixed. Jeff Kitts of GameSpot praised its visuals and realism but aimed some criticism at the handful of glitches. Todd Mowatt of Electronic Gaming Monthly complained of the frame rate and repetition in the full motion video commentary, but both he and co-reviewer Joe Rybicki gave the game their approval, citing the inclusion of fighting, one-timers, drop passes, and a wide selection of camera angles. A reviewer for Next Generation remarked that the player graphics and animations, while impressive in absolute terms, fall short of those in the PC version of the game and competitor NHL Powerplay. He also found the control was not as smooth and intuitive as in the Genesis version, and compared the game unfavorably to NHL FaceOff '97. Air Hendrix of GamePro agreed that NHL 97, while graphically impressive, was not as good as FaceOff due to its lack of strategy-oriented features. He also said the player switching is finicky and the D-pad-controlled aiming makes it difficult to execute precise shots, but spoke highly of the game's overall fun. Scott Alan Marriott stated in Allgame, "All in all, NHL 97 is still a fun game to play based on the quality of the graphics and presentation, but a few key issues keep it from being the definitive PlayStation hockey experience."

Air Hendrix made much the same comments of the Saturn version as he had of the PlayStation version the previous month, save that he stated that the graphics are not as sharp as the PlayStation version's, though still the best of any hockey game on the Saturn. However, this time he concluded that while NHL Faceoff '97 would be more appealing to strategy-oriented gamers, most would prefer NHL '97. Rich Leadbetter of Sega Saturn Magazine, contrarily, stated that "although the EA effort is probably superior in terms of presentation and optionary, I have to say that I prefer the Virgin title (ever-so-slightly) when it comes down to graphics and gameplay. And in the final analysis, that's what's more important." However, he regarded NHL '97 as a strong title in absolute terms, citing the believable 3D graphics, the strong sense of real skating, and the control method.

Stephen Poole of GameSpot criticized the PC version's difficult passing, nearly infallible AI goalies, and illogical button configuration when using a Gravis Gamepad, but nonetheless considered it "one of the most downright exciting sports titles I've ever played" for its lifelike graphics and animations, comprehensive licensing, customizable settings, and audio commentary. A Next Generation critic also regarded the game's graphics and animations as astoundingly realistic. He complimented the control, selection of views, comprehensive modes, and true-to-life AI, and summarized it as "The best-looking, fastest-moving, hardest-hitting hockey game on the PC". The game was honored with a Game of the Year award for Best Sports Game by PC Gamer.

The Mega Drive version of NHL 97 ranked fifth on an American video game sales chart published in the December 1996 issue of Swedish magazine Super Play.

NHL 97 was nominated as Computer Games Strategy Plus's 1996 sports game of the year, although it lost to Links LS, and won the same title at the 1996 Spotlight Awards.
