= NHLPA Hockey '93 =

1992 video game

- North American Genesis cover art featuring several players from the 1992–93 NHL season
- Developers: EA Studios (Genesis); Park Place Productions (SNES)
- Publisher: Electronic Arts (Note: Released under the Electronic Arts Sports Network banner)
- Composer: Jim Simmons
- Series: NHL
- Platforms: Sega Genesis/Mega Drive, Super NES
- Release: Genesis: NA: September 1992; EU: October 21, 1992; Super NES: NA: December 1992; EU: April 5, 1993
- Genre: Sports (ice hockey)
- Modes: Single-player, multiplayer

NHLPA Hockey '93 is a 1992 ice hockey video game released by Electronic Arts for the Sega Genesis and Super Nintendo Entertainment System. It is the second installment of the NHL series, following NHL Hockey (1991), and the first to be released for the Super NES.

Although it is considered to be the second EA Sports NHL game, the game was not licensed by the NHL; however, it did receive licensing permission from the NHLPA. Because of this, all teams are referred to only by city (the New York Islanders were referred to as "Long Island") with no use of the team nickname itself. Additionally, no NHL team logos or NHL emblems are seen anywhere in the game.

== Gameplay ==
Gameplay, which is viewed top-down, includes fighting in the rink, a feature that the NHL forbade the developer keeping in sequels. Match statistics are displayed at the bottom of the screen while player names appear at the top.

The game includes a single-game exhibition mode and a playoff mode (single-elimination or best-of-7), wherein the winner collects a trophy similar to the Stanley Cup. The game includes mostly complete rosters and all 24 teams from the 1991–92 NHL season, including the expansion of the Tampa Bay Lightning and Ottawa Senators.

The Genesis version also included EEPROM saving, which allowed one to save lines and the ongoing Playoff, while the Super NES version uses passwords to save progress.

== Development ==
Electronic Arts developed NHLPA Hockey as a sequel to NHL Hockey, which it published exclusively for the Sega Genesis in 1991. When making NHL Hockey, Park Place Productions aimed to replicate the success of its 1990 John Madden Football. The developers applied the concepts from the football game and included as many features as possible, with the intent to build on those in sequels. Among the features were official licensing from the National Hockey League and aggressive hockey gameplay inspired by Philadelphia's Broad Street Bullies team in the 1970s. After learning NHL Hockey allowed players to fight, then NHL president John Ziegler Jr. demanded the game mechanic be excluded from follow-up games. However, producer Michael Brook decided to forego the league license in order to keep the fighting gameplay; he believed players valued it more than official licensing. Aware of the bitter relationship between the NHL and National Hockey League Players' Association, Brook contacted the NHLPA directly rather than go through Time Warner for licensing as he did before. He approached the NHLPA's head of licensing, Ted Saskin, and director, Bob Goodenow, about what Time Warner told him. The cover features three players: Rod Brind’Amour, Mike Richter, and Randy Moller.

== Reception ==
Reception

Review scores
| Publication | Score |
|---|---|
| AllGame | 4.5/5 |
| Mega | 92% |
| MegaTech | 89% |
| Power Unlimited | 70% |

Video game retailer Babbage's reported that the Genesis and Super Nintendo versions were the fourth and seventh top selling games on their respective lists of console video games in November 1992. The Genesis and Super Nintendo titles rose to third and sixth, respectively, the follow month. The Genesis release ranked the sixth best selling video game software for the week ending December 19, 1992 at Software Etc. chain of stores. The game continued to climb Babbage's sales charts in February 1993, becoming the top selling Genesis game of the month as well as the fourth top Super Nintendo game. By March, the Genesis version dropped to number three whereas the Super Nintendo release exited the top ten list.

Computer Gaming World approved of the game's use of real NHL hockey player names and teams, and concluded that it was "just about as realistic and detailed as one could hope a cartridge game to be ... two red and blistered thumbs up". Power Unlimited gave the SNES version a score of 70% summarizing: "The action and sensation are also very much present in Electronic Arts' hockey game. Unfortunately, the sound is often very poor, and the screen is often overcrowded and therefore confusing. Thanks to the two player mode, it really becomes worthwhile."

Former video game publication AllGame also praised the realism that had been included in the game, specifically the addition of injuries and shattering glass, but expressed disappointment at the lack of a season mode. Criticism was also given to the lack of challenging AI, stating that "scoring goals is still too easy".

In 2001, Game Informer ranked it the 20th best video game ever made. The staff praised the game's depth and strategy.
