= NHL 25 =

- Standard edition cover art featuring Vancouver Canucks' Quinn Hughes
- Developer: EA Vancouver
- Publisher: EA Sports
- Series: NHL
- Engine: Frostbite
- Platforms: PlayStation 5 Xbox Series X/S
- Release: October 4, 2024
- Genre: Sports (ice hockey)
- Modes: Single-player, multiplayer

NHL 25 is an ice hockey simulation video game developed by EA Vancouver and published by EA Sports. It is the 34th installment in the NHL video game series and was released for the PlayStation 5 and Xbox Series X/S on October 4, 2024. NHL 25 is the first of the franchise to release exclusively on the Ninth generation of video game consoles.

The NHL 25 soundtrack features songs from Alkaline Trio, HARDY, Green Day, Kings of Leon, JXDN, Bleeker, Cage the Elephant, Dead Poet Society, Imagine Dragons, Idles, Safari Youth, Rival Sons, Twenty One Pilots, BRKN Love, and others. The reveal trailer featured music from Pennywise.

== Gameplay ==
In November, 2024 NHL 25 was updated with official coaches for the NHL teams. For the first time in the franchise, the game will include professional women's hockey teams from the Professional Women's Hockey League. NHL Arcade was added in an update, marking the mode's return since 2017.

== Reception ==
Reception

Aggregate scores
Aggregator	Score
Metacritic	(PS5) 66/100 (XSXS) 72/100
OpenCritic	26% recommend

Review scores
Publication	Score
Hardcore Gamer	4/5
IGN	6/10
Shacknews	6/10

NHL 25 received "mixed or average" reviews from critics, according to review aggregator Metacritic, and 13% of critics recommended the game, according to OpenCritic.
