= NHL 14 =

2013 video game

- Cover featuring Martin Brodeur
- Developer: EA Canada
- Publisher: EA Sports
- Series: NHL series
- Platforms: PlayStation 3; Xbox 360
- Release: NA: September 10, 2013; AU: September 12, 2013; EU: September 13, 2013
- Genre: Sports
- Modes: Single-player, multiplayer

NHL 14 is an ice hockey video game developed by EA Canada and published by EA Sports. It is the 23rd installment of the NHL series and was released in September 2013. However, the game was released on September 7, 2013 for subscribers of the EA Sports Season Ticket service.

Like the NHL 13 cover, anybody could vote on the player(s) they wished to see on the cover of NHL 14. The vote started on April 22, 2013 with 60 NHL players (2 players per team) in a single-elimination voting with two players in each match-up, and was closed on June 2, 2013. Devils goaltender Martin Brodeur and Blue Jackets goaltender Sergei Bobrovsky qualified for the final, and Martin Brodeur was announced as the winner on June 28, 2013. NHL 14 marked the first time since NHL 97 that a goaltender was featured on the official cover (John Vanbiesbrouck was on the cover that year), as well as the first goaltender on any official ice hockey video game cover since Marty Turco on 2K Sports' NHL 2K6. Jonas Hiller was featured on the cover of NHL 12, but only in PAL regions.

The online servers for the game were shut down on June 6, 2022.

== Features ==
NHL 14 has overhauls to two game engines, based on other sports titles developed by EA Canada. The collision physics are now powered by the same core technology behind the FIFA Player Impact Engine. For more realistic fights, the game employs the new Enforcer Engine based on the Fight Night series, resulting in the fighting view being changed back to third-person view. In addition, the True Performance Skating engine got some more improvements, and the game has a new deking system. The game's Be a Pro career mode now has off-the-ice interactions to dictate the player's overall legacy. NHL 14 also features a modernized version of NHL '94, called NHL '94 Anniversary mode, featuring current rosters and updated graphics to commemorate the game's 20th anniversary. This game also includes five Swiss NLA-league arenas.

=== Modes ===
- Live the Life Mode – This is an expanded version of the Be A Pro mode in previous versions of the NHL franchise. Off-ice decisions now affect player development. This can be compared to similar singleplayer modes in other sports games such as NBA 2K.
- HUT & EASHL Online Seasons – NHL 14 adds a promotion and relegation system to Hockey Ultimate Team & EA SPORTS Hockey League modes.
- NHL 94 Anniversary Mode – In this mode, the game can be played using the controller layout and presentation style of NHL '94.
- Winter Classic – Players have the option of playing the 2011 Winter Classic or the 2012 Winter Classic.
- NBC Matchup – In mid-March 2014, EA teamed up with NBC Sports to add their NHL Game of the Week between Thursdays and Sundays, and their Wednesday Night Rivalry game between Mondays and Wednesdays, for the remainder of the 2013–14 NHL season.

== Reception ==
Reception

Aggregate score
Aggregator	Score	
Aggregator	PS3	Xbox 360
Metacritic	80/100	81/100

Review scores
Publication	Score	
Publication	PS3	Xbox 360
Electronic Gaming Monthly	N/A	9.5/10
Game Informer	7.75/10	7.75/10
GameRevolution	N/A	4.5/5
GameSpot	6/10	6/10
Giant Bomb	N/A	4/5
IGN	8.3/10	8.3/10
Joystiq	N/A	3.5/5
PlayStation Official Magazine – Australia	8/10	N/A
PlayStation Official Magazine – UK	8/10	N/A
Official Xbox Magazine (US)	N/A	9/10
The Globe and Mail	N/A	9/10
National Post	N/A	9.5/10

NHL 14 received "favorable" reviews on both platforms according to the review aggregation website Metacritic. Overall it was regarded as an improvement in the NHL game franchise. The game was awarded "Best Sports Game" in the Game Critics Awards Best of E3 2013.

During the 17th Annual D.I.C.E. Awards, the Academy of Interactive Arts & Sciences nominated NHL 14 for "Sports Game of the Year".
