= NHL 13 =

2012 hockey video game

- Cover art featuring Claude Giroux
- Developer: EA Canada
- Publisher: EA Sports
- Series: NHL series
- Platforms: PlayStation 3; Xbox 360
- Release: NA: September 11, 2012; AU: September 13, 2012; EU: September 14, 2012
- Genre: Sports
- Modes: Single-player, multiplayer

NHL 13 is an ice hockey video game developed by EA Canada published by EA Sports. It is the 22nd installment of the NHL series. The game was released on the PlayStation 3 and the Xbox 360, featuring Philadelphia Flyers forward Claude Giroux on the cover. The game was featured at the Electronic Entertainment Expo 2012, which took place between June 5–7, 2012. The demo of the game was released on August 21–22, 2012, at the Xbox Live Marketplace and the PlayStation Store.

An exclusive "Stanley Cup Collector's Edition" was also released, apart from the actual NHL 13 game. The Collector's Edition includes five random Hockey Ultimate Team (HUT) player packs from the two 2012 Stanley Cup Final teams; a Gold Jumbo HUT pack including legend Wayne Gretzky; and a boost pack featuring the CCM RBZ stick.

On September 20, GamesIndustry.biz reported that NHL 13 had posted the best first week sales in the franchise's history.

Giroux became the first Philadelphia Flyer to appear on an EA Sports NHL video game cover since Eric Lindros in NHL 99, as well as the first Philadelphia Flyer to appear on any ice hockey video game cover since Jeremy Roenick on ESPN NHL Hockey in 2003. With this, the Philadelphia Flyers have more cover athletes than any other team.

== Features ==
All modes and features from NHL 12 remain in NHL 13. The following new features are included:

- EA Sports Hockey IQ (AI): Makes CPU-controlled players and teammates smarter by reacting to everything on the ice, not just what they see in front of them. Skaters will be more easily able to prevent scoring opportunities. For goaltenders, Hockey IQ opens up for a lot of new different types of desperation saves as they are better able to identify "potential" scoring threats. As part of Hockey IQ, there are over five times as many strategy options in NHL 13 compared to previous titles of the current generation of the NHL series to replicate the real-life plays in the National Hockey League (NHL). Also, players can now develop their own plays and implement them for the computer AI in gameplay. According to Dean Richards, general manager of the NHL series, the development team spent more time on the AI development in NHL 13 than in the past three years combined.
- True Performance Skating, a new skating engine based on physics, makes the player skating more dynamic and realistic with over 1,000 new animations created using motion capture. The engine is divided into three parts: explosiveness, top-end speed, and momentum. Explosiveness refers to how quickly a player can accelerate when gliding, being in a stationary state or how far a player can skate quickly. Top-end speed means that the players can skate as quickly as in real-life in their top speeds. Momentum is part of the physics; for example, a player skating at top speed may not turn around as quickly when carrying the puck as compared to when skating at normal speed or just gliding. Also, a player skating at top speed has his shooting and passing accuracies decreased. Momentum also means that players have a harder time recovering from mistakes. The new animations, combined with the Skill Stick features, allow for a lot of new plays and dekes that can be pulled off. True Performance Skating is taglined "Every Stride Matters".
- Improved rating system: In NHL 12, each player's overall rating is based on that player's role in the team (playmaker, enforcer, defensive defenceman etc.). In NHL 13, however, the player's overall rating is based on that player's skill in their position (i.e. forward, defenceman, or goaltender). For example, in NHL 12, George Parros (at that time playing for the Anaheim Ducks) was rated 81 overall (out of 99) based on his role as an enforcer. In NHL 13, Parros' overall rating has been lowered down to 69 as determined by his skill as a forward. EA Sports stated that this was "a fan-requested change". Based on their attribute values, the players are now also given 5-star ratings for these six categories: shooting, puck skills, senses, skating, physical, and defense. Further, the teams' overall ratings for offense, defense and goaltending are now also 5-star based ratings instead of out-of-100 ones.
- Team First Presentation aims to make the in-game experience more authentic than previously. Team-specific presentations for the NHL teams have been added, and it's also possible to manually customize the experience.
- GM Connected: Allows players to play in online Be a GM leagues with human-controlled teams. Players can keep track of what's happening in their league with a mobile app.
- NHL Moments Live: taglined "Can you recreate history?", this mode allows players to re-play and re-live great moments from the 2011–12 NHL season. In addition, new moments will be uploaded as the 2012–13 NHL season progresses.
- Hockey Ultimate Team: The design of HUT has been revamped, the reward system improved and a new playoff format for HUT has been added. New features for player-card collections have been added to make it easier to create a HUT team.
- All new GM Brain: Revamped Trade logic between AI GMs and users.
- EA Sports Hockey League remains in the game and features like club captains and improved matchmaking have been added.
- Be a Pro: Players are now able to demand a trade from their teams. Once the user demands a trade, their GM will evaluate the player's performance and place the user on the trading block. Players can also choose to retire at any given point at their career.
- Refined goalie controls: In previous games of the current NHL generation, the right stick was used to make a manual save. In NHL 13 the right stick is now used to anticipate a save instead of actually attempting to make a save.

== National teams ==
Players who do not participate in the official leagues in NHL 13 do not participate in the national teams either. The rest of the rosters are created by the game creators.

The demo includes three HUT Item Packs that players can earn and use in the retail version of NHL 13. One can be earned by winning the demo moment in NHL Moments Live; another one can be found in the HUT mode by defeating Team USA and winning the playoff tournament; and a third one can be obtained by inviting a friend to play the NHL 13 demo.

== Soundtrack ==
The soundtrack features songs from various artists such as Shinedown, Classified, Anti-Flag, The Offspring, and The Hives.

== Game modes ==
NHL 13, like many of the other games in the series, includes a season game mode, playoffs, practice, GM Connected, Be a Pro, Hockey Ultimate Team, NHL Moments Live, and EA Sports Hockey League. If playing on Xbox 360, Xbox Live may be required to access some of these game modes.

== Reception ==
Reception

Aggregate score
Aggregator	Score	
Aggregator	PS3	Xbox 360
Metacritic	84/100	83/100

Review scores
Publication	Score	
Publication	PS3	Xbox 360
Destructoid	8.5/10	N/A
Electronic Gaming Monthly	N/A	8/10
Game Informer	8/10	8/10
GameRevolution	N/A	3.5/5
GameSpot	8/10	8/10
GameTrailers	N/A	9/10
Giant Bomb	N/A	4/5
Hyper	N/A	7/10
IGN	8.5/10	8.5/10
Official Xbox Magazine (US)	N/A	8/10
Polygon	N/A	8.5/10
PlayStation: The Official Magazine	9/10	N/A

NHL 13 received "favourable" reviews on both platforms according to the review aggregation website Metacritic.
