= Deke (ice hockey) =

Ice hockey technique

In this diagram, the player in blue dekes around the defender and scores a goal.

In ice hockey, a deke is a type of feint or fake technique whereby a player draws an opposing player out of position or skates by the opponent while maintaining possession and control of the puck. The term is a Canadianism formed by abbreviating the word decoy.

The position of the player performing the deke and the defender determines where the puck will be moved and the speed. The deke can be used to move the puck out of reach of an opposing player, move the puck past the opposing player, or quickly change direction of the puck so the opposing player is caught out of position. Dekes are usually used in combination with either a change of direction or speed, or both; the deke may refer to the entire sequence of actions as well as the maneuver(s) made with the stick. Often a change in direction or a change in speed is enough to get past an opposing player, but dekes are used in combination with these to better protect the puck and get by a defender.

== Types ==
One type is the head fake, using a movement of the head to fool an opposing player over the player's movements or intention.

=== Toe drag ===
A more complex deke is the toe drag, a deke in which the puck carrier brings the puck forward on their forehand, and subsequently turns their stick and pulls the puck towards themselves with the toe of the blade, while moving past the defender, who has presumably attempted to poke check the puck in its previous position.
