= NHL 10 =

2009 video game

- The cover of NHL 10 featuring Patrick Kane
- Developer: EA Canada
- Publisher: Electronic Arts
- Series: NHL series
- Platforms: PlayStation 3 Xbox 360
- Release: NA: September 15, 2009; AU: September 17, 2009; EU: September 18, 2009
- Genre: Sports
- Modes: Single-player, multiplayer

NHL 10 is a video game in the NHL series developed and released by EA Canada and published by Electronic Arts, and is the 19th game in the series. The game debuted at Hockey Fest '09, a three-day interactive festival celebrating the sport of hockey and the Los Angeles Kings, which took place in downtown Los Angeles from August 28 to 30.

On October 1, 2011, all online services for NHL 10 were discontinued.

== New features ==
- Battle on the Boards: A new board play physics engine lets players shield the puck along the boards, kick-pass it to teammates, or pin an opponent.
- Intimidation Tactics: Players are able to fore-check defenders, pressure the puck, and finish checks to force your opposing skaters into making mistakes. Engaging the opposing team's star players will now instigate players and fans. Skaters who frequently harass star players will become antagonized by the opposing crowd and players.
- Post-Whistle Action: Players are able to finish checks, retaliate for late shots on goal, draw penalties, and pick fights after the referee blows the whistle.
- New First Person Fighting Engine: Players controlling the team's enforcer are able to engage instigators in a new first person fighting simulator.
- Spectacular Goals: Introducing spectacular new ways to score, like players one-timing loose pucks, stick-handling and shooting from their knees, batting pucks out of the air, and lifting a leg to fake a shot on goal.
- New Precision Passing: A new 360° precision passing mechanic delivers control over the speed and direction of passes so players can bank passes off the boards or play the puck into space for teammates to skate on to it. Players take poor passes off their skates and kick the puck to their sticks.
- Improved Goalie Intelligence: Goaltenders will be able to position themselves more intelligently, react to shots more quickly, and recover from saves faster. NHL 10 features 250 new goalie animations, including swatting pucks out of the air, second and third saves, and desperation lunges.
- Interactive Atmosphere: Animations of fans within the game have been rendered to appear more lifelike and detailed. Playoff games will feature towel-waving fans and greater reactions from the crowds.
- Be A GM Mode: Players will now be able to control a team as if they were a general manager in the "Be A GM" mode. This feature enables players to build their own dynasty team through drafting, trading, and signing skaters. A player's success will be measured by the number of positive influences they have on their franchise.
- Battle for the Cup Mode: This mode allows players to choose two opposing teams and pit them against each other in the Stanley Cup Final. Players have the option to play a one-, three-, five-, or sevem- game elimination round. The winning team will be presented with the Stanley Cup.
- First-person fighting view - The traditional third-person view during fights has been replaced with a first-person view.

In addition to the standard NHL and AHL leagues, NHL 10 also features the Swedish Elitserien, Finland's SM-liiga, Germany's DEL, and the Czech O2 Extraliga, all of which were featured in the previous installment, NHL 09. This game also adds a new league, the Swiss National League A. Despite being featured in NHL 09 as the Russian Superleague and being one of the highest-ranked hockey leagues in the world, the Kontinental Hockey League was not featured in NHL 10. Like the previous game, NHL 10 features national teams from multiple countries; however they are not licensed by the IIHF and as such, the rosters used are not the official ones, and some countries' teams such as Great Britain's, Italy's, and Japan's had to use fictional players on the rosters due to the lack of players and teams from their respective countries in the game.

== Reception ==
Reception

Aggregate score
Aggregator	Score	
Aggregator	PS3	Xbox 360
Metacritic	88/100	88/100

Review scores
Publication	Score	
Publication	PS3	Xbox 360
1Up.com	A−	A−
Destructoid	9.5/10	N/A
Game Informer	9.25/10	9.25/10
GamePro	5/5	5/5
GameSpot	8.5/10	8.5/10
GameTrailers	9.3/10	9.3/10
GameZone	9/10	9/10
IGN	8.7/10	8.7/10
Official Xbox Magazine (US)	N/A	9/10
PlayStation: The Official Magazine	4.5/5	N/A

The game received "generally favorable reviews" on both platforms according to the review aggregation website Metacritic.

During the 13th Annual Interactive Achievement Awards, the Academy of Interactive Arts & Sciences nominated NHL 10 for "Sports Game of the Year".
