= NHL 09 =

2008 video game

- Cover of NHL 09, featuring Dion Phaneuf of the Calgary Flames
- Developers: EA Canada (PlayStation 3, Xbox 360); HB Studios (Microsoft Windows, PlayStation 2)
- Publisher: EA Sports
- Series: NHL series
- Platforms: Microsoft Windows, PlayStation 2, PlayStation 3, Xbox 360
- Release: PlayStation 3 & Xbox 360: NA: September 9, 2008; EU: September 12, 2008 (X360); AU: September 25, 2008; EU: September 26, 2008 (PS3); Windows: NA: October 20, 2008; AU: October 30, 2008; EU: November 7, 2008; PlayStation 2: NA: November 4, 2008; AU: November 13, 2008; EU: November 14, 2008
- Genre: Sports
- Modes: Single-player, Multiplayer

NHL 09 is the 17th video game in the NHL series released by EA Sports in 2008. This was the final NHL game to be released on the PlayStation 2 and Microsoft Windows.

== Gameplay ==
=== Online play ===
Players have the ability to create a player to use in online play featuring 6 versus 6 online teamplay mode. Users can join online teams with friends or find players to create one. Users have the ability to level up players, participate in tournaments (with brackets), and receive awards at the end of the season. Rosters have been updated, as well as slap shot power and accuracy to complement NHL updates.

== Reception ==
=== Critical response ===
The Xbox 360 and PlayStation 3 versions received "generally favorable reviews", while the PC version received "mixed" reviews, according to the review aggregation website Metacritic.

During the 12th Annual Interactive Achievement Awards, the Academy of Interactive Arts & Sciences awarded NHL 09 with "Sports Game of the Year"; it also received a nomination for "Outstanding Achievement in Online Gameplay".

Reception

Aggregate score
Aggregator	Score		
Aggregator	PC	PS3	Xbox 360
Metacritic	62/100	88/100	88/100

Review scores
Publication	Score		
Publication	PC	PS3	Xbox 360
Destructoid	N/A	9.6/10	N/A
Game Informer	N/A	9.25/10	9.25/10
GamePro	N/A	N/A	5/5
GameRevolution	N/A	B	B
GameSpot	N/A	9/10	9/10
GameSpy	N/A	N/A	4.5/5
GameTrailers	N/A	N/A	9.3/10
GameZone	N/A	9.1/10	9/10
IGN	5.5/10	9/10	9/10
Official Xbox Magazine (US)	N/A	N/A	9/10
PlayStation: The Official Magazine	N/A	4/5	N/A
411Mania	N/A	8.9/10	N/A
