= 1998 in video games =

1998 saw many sequels and prequels in video games, such as F-Zero X, Marvel vs. Capcom, The Legend of Zelda: Ocarina of Time, Resident Evil 2, Metal Gear Solid, Crash Bandicoot: Warped, Street Fighter Alpha 3, Fallout 2, and Tomb Raider III, along with new titles such as Banjo-Kazooie, Dance Dance Revolution, Half-Life, Radiant Silvergun, Spyro the Dragon, StarCraft and Xenogears. In Japan, Sega released the Dreamcast which was the first console of the sixth generation and also the company's last-ever console.

The year has been retrospectively considered one of the best and most influential in video game history due to the release of numerous critically acclaimed, commercially successful and influential titles across all platforms and genres at the time. The year's best-selling video game console was the PlayStation for the third year in a row. The year's most critically acclaimed title was The Legend of Zelda: Ocarina of Time, which remains Metacritic's highest-scoring game of all time. The year's best-selling home video game worldwide was Pokémon Red/Green/Blue/Pikachu for the Game Boy, while the year's highest-grossing arcade game in Japan was Tekken 3.

== Legend ==
Video game platforms
| Arcade | Arcade video game | DC | Dreamcast | GB | Game Boy |
| GBC | Game Boy Color | GEN | Genesis / Mega Drive | MAC | Classic Mac OS, 2001 and before |
| N64 | Nintendo 64, iQue Player | NEO | Neo Geo AES | NEOCD | Neo Geo CD |
| NES | Nintendo Entertainment System / Famicom | PS1 | PlayStation 1 | SAT | Sega Saturn |
| SNES | Super NES / Super Famicom / Super Comboy | WIN | Windows, all versions Windows 95 and up | | |

Video game genres
| Action | Action game | Action RPG | Action role-playing game | Action-adventure | Action-adventure game |
| Adventure | Adventure game | Business Sim | Term not found | City builder | City-building game |
| Dating sim | Dating sim | DCCG | Digital collectible card game | Fighting | Fighting game |
| FPS | First-person shooter | Music | Music video game | Platformer | Platformer |
| Puzzle | Puzzle video game | Racing | Racing video game | Rhythm | Rhythm game |
| Roguelike | Roguelike, Roguelite | RPG | Role-playing video game | RTS | Real-time strategy |
| RTT | Real-time tactics | Sports | Sports video game | Stealth | Stealth game |
| Strategy | Strategy video game | Tactical RPG | Tactical role-playing game | TPS | Third-person shooter |
| Virtual pet | Virtual pet | Visual novel | Visual novel | | |

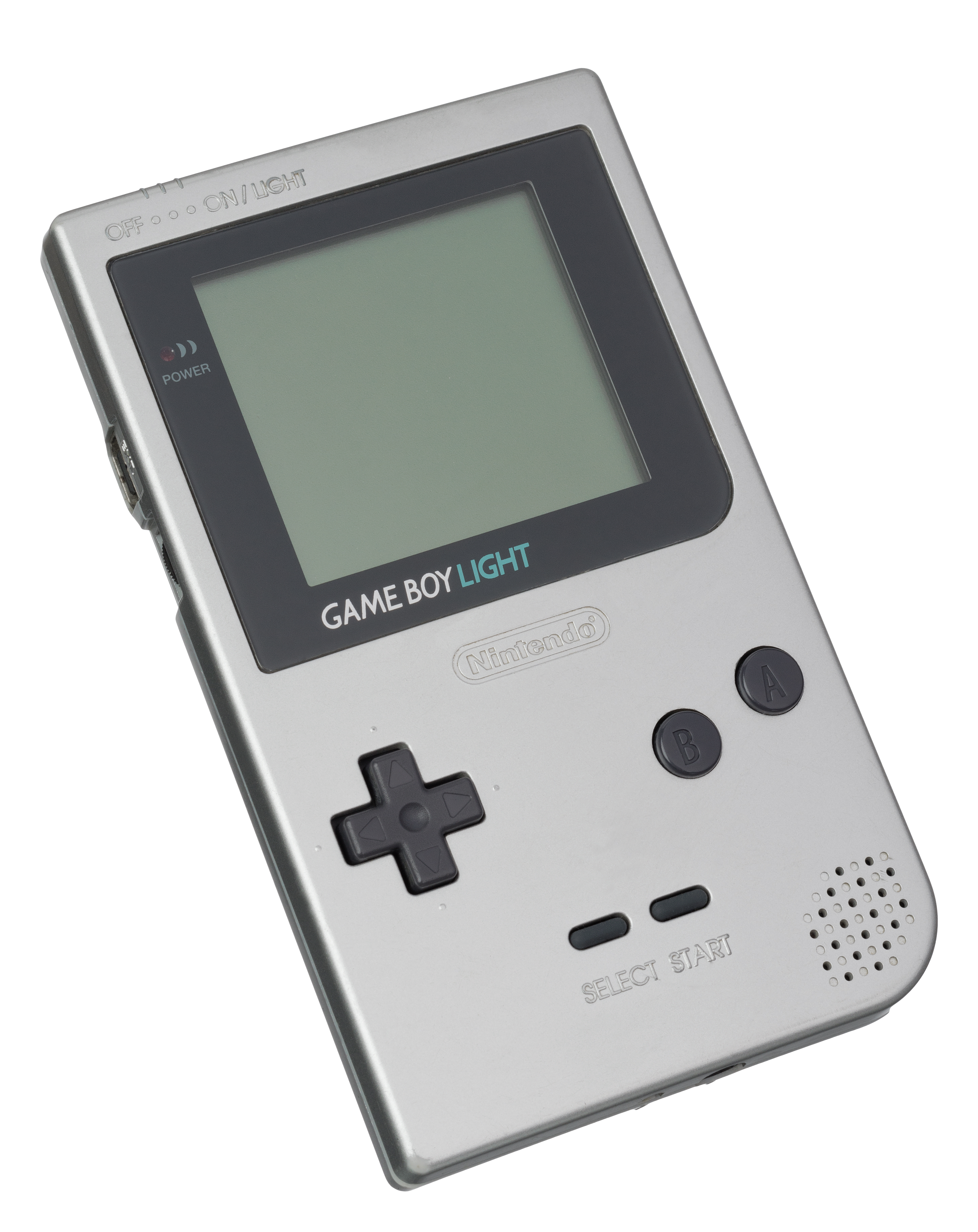
Game Boy Light

== Hardware releases ==
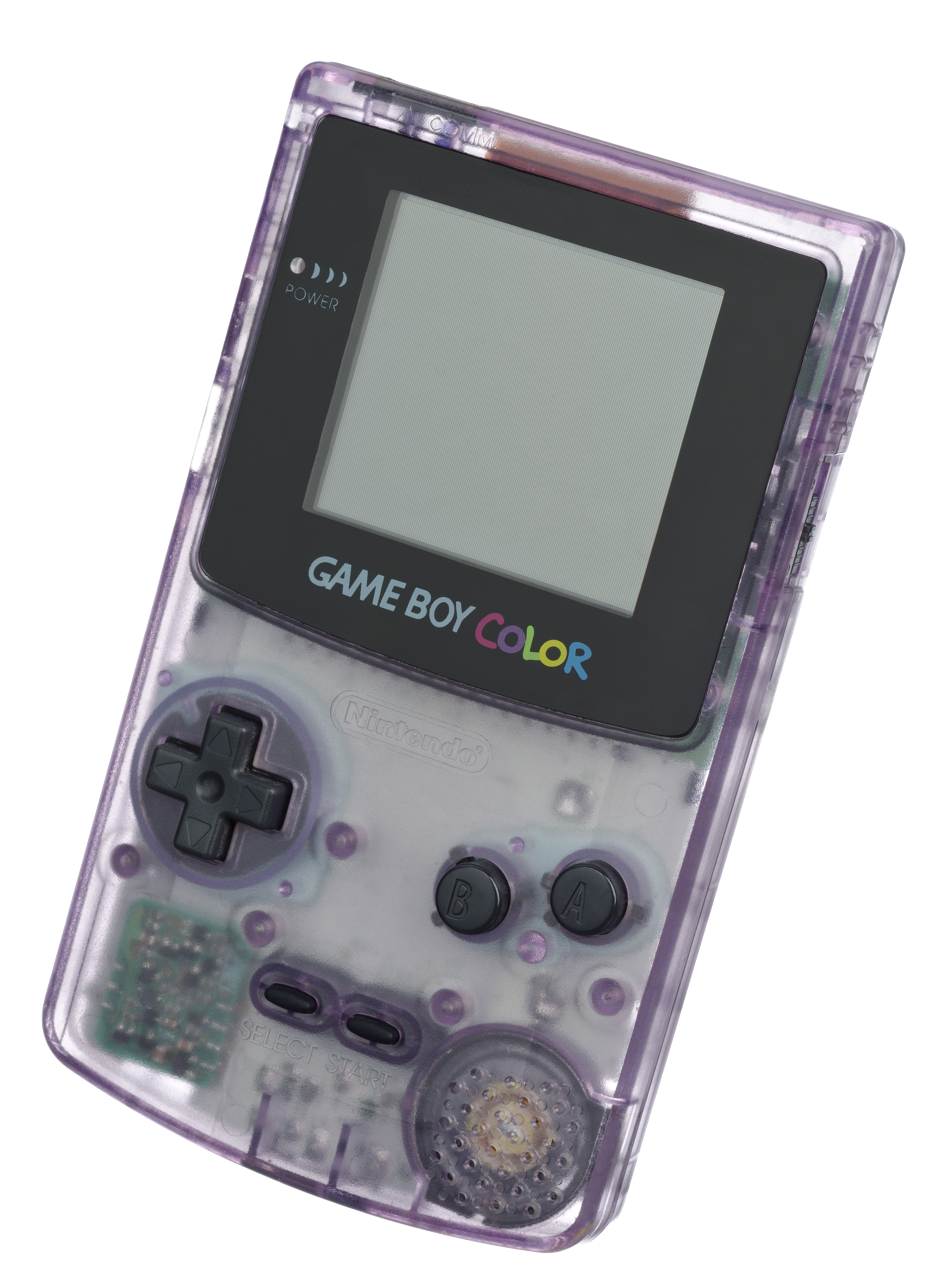
Game Boy Color

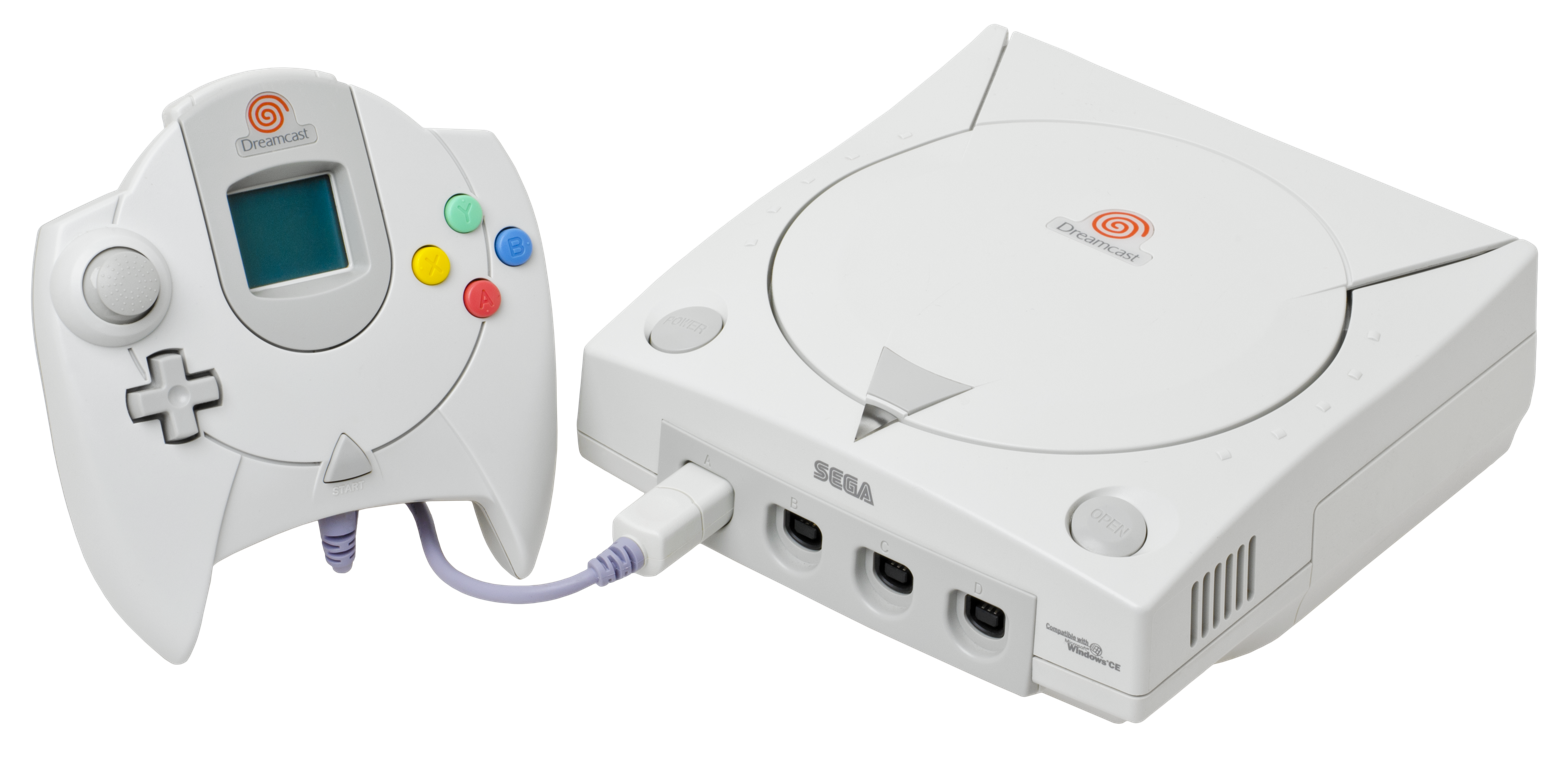
Dreamcast

This is a list of all the game-related hardware released in 1998.

The Sixth generation of video game consoles started off this year with the launch of Sega's Dreamcast in Japan.

Nintendo released the Game Boy Color, the successor to the original Game Boy.

| Date | System |
|---|---|
| April 14 | Game Boy Light^{JP} |
| October 21 | Game Boy Color^{JP} |
| November 18 | Game Boy Color^{NA} |
| November 23 | Game Boy Color^{EU} |
| November 27 | Dreamcast^{JP} |
| November 27 | Game Boy Color^{AU} |

== Top-rated games ==
=== Game of the Year awards ===
The following titles won Game of the Year awards for 1998.

| Awards | Game of the Year | Platform(s) | Publisher(s) | Genre | Ref |
|---|---|---|---|---|---|
| CESA Awards | Zelda no Densetsu: Toki no Ocarina (The Legend of Zelda: Ocarina of Time) | N64 | Nintendo | Action-adventure | |
| Japan Media Arts Festival | Zelda no Densetsu: Toki no Ocarina (The Legend of Zelda: Ocarina of Time) | N64 | Nintendo | Action-adventure | |
| Digitiser | The Legend of Zelda: Ocarina of Time | N64 | Nintendo | Action-adventure | |
| Edge | The Legend of Zelda: Ocarina of Time | N64 | Nintendo | Action-adventure | |
| Electronic Gaming Monthly (EGM) | The Legend of Zelda: Ocarina of Time | N64 | Nintendo | Action-adventure | |
| Game Informer | The Legend of Zelda: Ocarina of Time | N64 | Nintendo | Action-adventure | |
| GamePro | The Legend of Zelda: Ocarina of Time | N64 | Nintendo | Action-adventure | |
| GameSpot | The Legend of Zelda: Ocarina of Time | N64 | Nintendo | Action-adventure | |
| Interactive Achievement Awards | The Legend of Zelda: Ocarina of Time | N64 | Nintendo | Action-adventure | |
| BAFTA Interactive Entertainment Awards | GoldenEye 007 | N64 | Nintendo | FPS | |
| Video Software Dealers Association | GoldenEye 007 | N64 | Nintendo | FPS | |
| Hyper | Final Fantasy VII | PS1, WIN | Sony, Eidos | RPG | |
| RPGFan | Final Fantasy VII | PS1, WIN | Sony, Eidos | RPG | |
| Computer Gaming World Premier Awards | Half-Life | WIN | Sierra Studios | FPS | |
| GameSpot | Grim Fandango | WIN | LucasArts | Adventure | |
| Gamest Awards | Psychic Force 2012 | Arcade | Taito | Fighting | |
| Official U.S. PlayStation Magazine | Metal Gear Solid | PS1 | Konami | Stealth | |
| RPGFan | Lunar 2: Eternal Blue | SAT | Game Arts | RPG | |

=== Critically acclaimed titles ===
==== Metacritic and GameRankings ====
Metacritic (MC) and GameRankings (GR) are aggregators of video game journalism reviews.

1998 games and expansions scoring at least 88/100 (MC) or 87.5% (GR)
| Game | Publisher | Release Date | Platform | MC score | GR score |
|---|---|---|---|---|---|
| The Legend of Zelda: Ocarina of Time | Nintendo | November 21, 1998 | N64 | 99/100 | 97.54% |
| Tekken 3 | Namco | March 26, 1998 | PS1 | 96/100 | 95.8% |
| Half-Life | Sierra Entertainment | November 19, 1998 | WIN | 96/100 | 94.02% |
| Metal Gear Solid | Konami | September 3, 1998 | PS1 | 94/100 | 93.24% |
| Grim Fandango | LucasArts | October 30, 1998 | WIN | 94/100 | 92.97% |
| Resident Evil 2 | Capcom | January 21, 1998 | PS1 | 89/100 | 93.13% |
| Street Fighter Alpha 3 | Capcom | December 23, 1998 | PS1 | 93/100 | 90.28% |
| StarCraft | Blizzard Entertainment | March 31, 1998 | WIN | 88/100 | 92.85% |
| Panzer Dragoon Saga | Sega | January 29, 1998 | SAT | —N/a | 92.46% |
| Banjo-Kazooie | Nintendo | June 29, 1998 | N64 | 92/100 | 92.38% |
| Thief: The Dark Project | Eidos Interactive | December 1, 1998 | WIN | 92/100 | 89.41% |
| Baldur's Gate | Interplay Entertainment | December 21, 1998 | WIN | 91/100 | 91.94% |
| The Legend of Zelda: Link's Awakening DX | Nintendo | December 12, 1998 | GBC | —N/a | 91.21% |
| International Superstar Soccer 98 | Konami | June 4, 1998 | N64 | 91/100 | 89.15% |
| Crash Bandicoot: Warped | Sony Computer Entertainment | November 3, 1998 | PS1 | 91/100 | 89.07% |
| Xenogears | Square | February 11, 1998 | PS1 | 84/100 | 90.99% |
| Oddworld: Abe's Exoddus | GT Interactive | November 17, 1998 | PS1 | 88/100 | 90.42% |
| NFL Blitz | Midway Games | September 12, 1998 | PS1 | —N/a | 90.13% |
| NFL Blitz | Midway Games | September 9, 1998 | N64 | —N/a | 90.02% |
| 1080° Snowboarding | Nintendo | February 28, 1998 | N64 | —N/a | 89.60% |
| Battlezone | Activision | March 11, 1998 | WIN | —N/a | 89.03% |
| Railroad Tycoon II | Gathering of Developers | November 2, 1998 | WIN | 89/100 | 83.15% |
| Turok 2: Seeds of Evil | Acclaim Entertainment | December 10, 1998 | N64 | 86/100 | 88.96% |
| FIFA 99 | EA Sports | October 31, 1998 | WIN | —N/a | 88.87% |
| Caesar III | Sierra Entertainment | September 30, 1998 | WIN | —N/a | 88.6% |
| Unreal | GT Interactive | May 22, 1998 | WIN | —N/a | 88.58% |
| NBA Live 99 | EA Sports | November 10, 1998 | PS1 | —N/a | 88.39% |
| R4: Ridge Racer Type 4 | Namco | December 3, 1998 | PS1 | 88/100 | 88.16% |
| NHL 99 | EA Sports | September 30, 1998 | WIN | —N/a | 88.11% |
| Wario Land II | Nintendo | March 7, 1998 | GBC | —N/a | 88.04% |
| Myth II: Soulblighter | Bungie | December 28, 1998 | WIN | 88/100 | 86.39% |
| Need for Speed III: Hot Pursuit | Electronic Arts | March 25, 1998 | PS1 | 88/100 | 85.63% |
| Starsiege: Tribes | Sierra Entertainment | December 23, 1998 | WIN | 88/100 | 84.77% |
| Shogo: Mobile Armor Division | Monolith Productions | October 15, 1998 | WIN | 88/100 | 81.6% |
| FIFA 99 | EA Sports | October 31, 1998 | PS1 | —N/a | 87.95% |
| F-Zero X | Nintendo | July 14, 1998 | N64 | 85/100 | 87.61% |
| Madden NFL 99 | EA Sports | September 23, 1998 | N64 | —N/a | 87.59% |

==== Famitsu Platinum Hall of Fame ====
The following video game releases in 1998 entered Famitsu magazine's "Platinum Hall of Fame" for receiving Famitsu scores of at least 35 out of 40.

| Title | Platform | Publisher | Genre | Score (out of 40) |
|---|---|---|---|---|
| The Legend of Zelda: Toki no Ocarina (Ocarina of Time) | N64 | Nintendo | Action-adventure | 40 |
| Tekken 3 | PS1 | Namco | Fighting | 39 |
| Sonic Adventure | DC | Sega | Platformer | 38 |
| Biohazard 2 (Resident Evil 2) | PS1 | Capcom | Survival horror | 37 |
| Metal Gear Solid | PS1 | Konami | Stealth | 37 |
| Virtua Fighter 3tb | DC | Sega | Fighting | 36 |
| Azel: Panzer Dragoon RPG (Panzer Dragon Saga) | SAT | Sega | RPG | 35 |
| Neo Atlas | PS1 | Artdink | Strategy | 35 |
| Shiritsu Justice Gakuen: Legion of Heroes (Rival Schools) | PS1 | Capcom | Fighting | 35 |
| Dragon Quest Monsters: Terry no Wonderland | GBC | Enix | RPG | 35 |
| Beatmania | PS1 | Konami | Rhythm | 35 |
| R4: Ridge Racer Type 4 | PS1 | Namco | Racing | 35 |
| Crash Bandicoot 3 (Warped) | PS1 | Sony | Platformer | 35 |
| Street Fighter Zero 3 (Street Fighter Alpha 3) | PS1 | Capcom | Fighting | 35 |

== Financial performance ==
=== Best-selling video game consoles ===
| Rank | Manufacturer | Platform | Type | Generation | Sales | | |
| Rank | Manufacturer | Platform | Type | Generation | Japan | United States | Worldwide |
|---|---|---|---|---|---|---|---|
| 1 | Sony | PS1 | Home | 5th | 4,660,000 | 9,130,000 | 22,500,000 |
| 2 | Nintendo | GB / GBC | Handheld | 4th | 4,730,000 | 2,430,000 | 12,990,000 |
| 3 | Nintendo | N64 | Home | 5th | 1,210,000 | 3,881,000 | 7,860,000 |
| 4 | Nintendo | SNES | Home | 4th | 50,000 | 200,000 | 1,430,000 |
| 5 | Sega | DC | Home | 6th | 900,000 | —N/a | 900,000 |
| 6 | Sega | GEN | Home | 4th | —N/a | 659,000 | 659,000+ |
| 7 | Sega | SAT | Home | 5th | 150,000 | 55,000 | 205,000+ |
| 8 | Nintendo | NES | Home | 3rd | 50,000 | 120 | 50,120 |

=== Best-selling home video games ===
The following titles were the top ten best-selling home video games (console games or computer games) of 1998 in Japan, the United States, and Germany.

Best-selling home video games in Japan, United States and Germany
| Rank | Title | Platform | Sales | | | |
| Rank | Title | Platform | Japan | United States | Germany | Combined |
|---|---|---|---|---|---|---|
| 1 | Pokémon Red / Green / Blue / Pikachu | GB | 3,288,391 (Note: Pocket Monsters: Red / Green / Blue (Pokémon Red / Green / Blue) sold 1,739,391 units. Pocket Monsters: Pikachu (Pokémon Yellow) sold 1,549,000 units.) | 4,000,000 | —N/a | 7,288,391 |
| 2 | Resident Evil 2 (Biohazard 2) | PS1 | 2,298,814 | 1,194,840 | Unknown | 3,493,654+ |
| 3 | The Legend of Zelda: Ocarina of Time | N64 | 920,000 | 2,500,000 | Unknown | 3,420,000+ |
| 4 | Gran Turismo | PS1 | 1,495,761 | 1,431,483 | 270,000+ | 3,197,244+ |
| 5 | Tekken 3 | PS1 | 1,266,000 | 1,113,749 | 100,000+ | 2,479,749+ |
| 6 | GoldenEye 007 | N64 | < 17,676 | 2,300,000 | Unknown | 2,300,000+ |
| 7 | Metal Gear Solid | PS1 | 765,000 | 1,064,909 | —N/a | 1,829,909 |
| 8 | Dragon Quest Monsters: Terry no Wonderland | GBC | 1,660,000 | —N/a | —N/a | 1,660,000 |
| 9 | Crash Bandicoot: Warped (Crash Bandicoot 3) | PS1 | 649,000 | 858,726 | Unknown | 1,507,726+ |
| 10 | Crash Bandicoot 2: Cortex Strikes Back | PS1 | 395,884 | 941,686 | Unknown | 1,337,570+ |

The following titles were the top ten highest-grossing home video games of 1998 in the United States and Europe.

Highest-grossing home video games in United States and Europe
| Rank | Title | Platform(s) | Sales revenue | | | |
| Rank | Title | Platform(s) | United States | Europe | Combined | Inflation |
|---|---|---|---|---|---|---|
| 1 | The Legend of Zelda: Ocarina of Time | N64 | $150,000,000 | €39,000,000+ ($44,000,000+) | $194,000,000+ | $380,000,000+ |
| 2 | Gran Turismo | PS1 | $58,568,520 | €66,000,000+ ($74,000,000+) | $132,568,520+ | $261,862,072+ |
| 3 | Resident Evil 2 | PS1 | $58,597,202 | €29,000,000+ ($33,000,000+) | $91,597,202+ | $180,931,590+ |
| 4 | GoldenEye 007 | N64 | $70,377,973+ | €19,000,000+ ($21,000,000+) | $91,377,973+ | $180,498,548+ |
| 5 | Tekken 3 | PS1 | $48,554,550 | €36,000,000+ ($40,000,000+) | $88,554,550+ | $174,921,452+ |
| 6 | Banjo-Kazooie | N64 | $51,790,624 | €26,000,000+ ($29,000,000+) | $80,790,624+ | $159,585,400+ |
| 7 | Tomb Raider III | | Unknown | €68,000,000+ ($74,000,000+) | $74,000,000+ | $146,000,000+ |
| 8 | Pokémon Red / Blue | GB | $70,000,000+ | —N/a | $70,000,000+ | $138,000,000+ |
| 9 | Super Mario 64 | N64 | $39,184,953 | €21,000,000+ ($24,000,000+) | $63,184,953+ | $124,808,987+ |
| 10 | FIFA 99 | | Unknown | €50,000,000+ ($56,000,000+) | $56,000,000+ | $111,000,000+ |

==== Japan ====
In Japan, the following titles were the top ten best-selling home video games of 1998.

| Rank | Title | Platform | Publisher | Genre | Sales | Ref |
|---|---|---|---|---|---|---|
| 1 | Pocket Monsters: Red / Green / Blue / Pikachu (Pokémon) | GB | Nintendo | RPG | 3,288,391 | |
| 2 | Biohazard 2 (Resident Evil 2) | PS1 | Capcom | Survival horror | 2,298,814+ | |
| 3 | Dragon Quest Monsters: Terry no Wonderland | GBC | Enix | RPG | 1,660,000 | |
| 4 | Gran Turismo | PS1 | Sony | Racing (Sim) | 1,495,761 | |
| 5 | Tekken 3 | PS1 | Namco | Fighting | 1,266,000 | |
| 6 | Yu-Gi-Oh! Duel Monsters | PS1 | Konami | DCCG | 1,175,000 | |
| 7 | Parasite Eve | PS1 | Squaresoft | Horror | 1,049,000 | |
| 8 | Tales of Destiny | PS1 | Namco | Action RPG | 965,280+ | |
| 9 | The Legend of Zelda: Toki no Ocarina (Ocarina of Time) | N64 | Nintendo | Action-adventure | 920,000 | |
| 10 | Xenogears | PS1 | Squaresoft | RPG | 892,015 | |

==== United States ====
In the United States, the following titles were the top ten best-selling home video games of 1998.

| Rank | Title | Platform | Publisher | Genre | Sales | Revenue | Inflation |
|---|---|---|---|---|---|---|---|
| 1 | Pokémon Red / Blue | GB | Nintendo | RPG | 4,000,000 | $70,000,000+ | $138,000,000+ |
| 2 | The Legend of Zelda: Ocarina of Time | N64 | Nintendo | Action-adventure | 2,500,000 | $150,000,000 | $300,000,000 |
| 3 | GoldenEye 007 | N64 | Nintendo | FPS | 2,300,000 | $70,377,973+ | $139,017,331+ |
| 4 | Gran Turismo | PS1 | Sony | Racing (Sim) | 1,431,483 | $58,568,520 | $115,690,166 |
| 5 | Resident Evil 2 | PS1 | Capcom | Survival horror | 1,194,840 | $58,597,202 | $115,746,821 |
| 6 | Tekken 3 | PS1 | Namco | Fighting | 1,113,749 | $48,554,550 | $95,909,610 |
| 7 | Madden NFL 99 | PS1 | EA Sports | Sports | 1,073,777 | $44,130,798 | $87,171,390 |
| 8 | Metal Gear Solid | PS1 | Konami | Stealth | 1,064,909 | $51,834,077 | $102,387,647 |
| 9 | Banjo-Kazooie | N64 | Nintendo | Platformer | 1,054,349 | $51,790,624 | $102,301,814 |
| 10 | Super Mario 64 | N64 | Nintendo | Platformer | 946,411 | $39,184,953 | $77,401,882 |

==== Europe ====
In Europe, the following titles were the top ten highest-grossing home video games of 1998.

| Rank | Title | Platform(s) | Europe sales revenue | | France | Germany |
| Rank | Title | Platform(s) | Sales revenue | Inflation | Rank | Sales |
|---|---|---|---|---|---|---|
| 1 | Tomb Raider III | | €68,000,000+ ($74,000,000+) | $150,000,000+ | Unknown | Unknown |
| 2 | Gran Turismo | PS1 | €66,000,000+ ($74,000,000+) | $150,000,000+ | 1 | 270,000+ |
| 3 | FIFA 99 | | €50,000,000+ ($56,000,000+) | $111,000,000+ | Unknown | Unknown |
| 4 | World Cup 98 | | €48,000,000+ ($54,000,000+) | $107,000,000+ | Unknown | 339,000+ |
| 5 | The Legend of Zelda: Ocarina of Time | N64 | €39,000,000+ ($44,000,000+) | $87,000,000+ | Unknown | Unknown |
| 5 | Tomb Raider II | | €39,000,000+ ($44,000,000+) | $87,000,000+ | Unknown | 358,000+ |
| 7 | FIFA: Road to World Cup 98 | | €37,000,000+ ($41,000,000+) | $81,000,000+ | Unknown | 160,000+ |
| 8 | Tekken 3 | PS1 | €36,000,000+ ($40,000,000+) | $79,000,000+ | Unknown | 100,000+ |
| 9 | Colin McRae Rally | | €30,000,000+ ($34,000,000+) | $67,000,000+ | Unknown | |
| 10 | Resident Evil 2 | PS1 | €29,000,000+ ($33,000,000+) | $65,000,000+ | Unknown | |

==== Australia ====
In Australia, the following titles were the top ten best-selling home console games of 1998.

| Rank | Title | Platform | Developer | Publisher | Genre |
|---|---|---|---|---|---|
| 1 | GoldenEye 007 | N64 | Rare | Nintendo | FPS |
| 2 | Gran Turismo | PS1 | Polys Entertainment | Sony | Racing (Sim) |
| 3 | Banjo-Kazooie | N64 | Rare | Nintendo | Platformer |
| 4 | Crash Bandicoot (Platinum) | PS1 | Naughty Dog | Sony | Platformer |
| 5 | Mario Kart 64 | N64 | Nintendo EAD | Nintendo | Racing (Kart) |
| 6 | Super Mario 64 | N64 | Nintendo EAD | Nintendo | Platformer |
| 7 | The Legend of Zelda: Ocarina of Time | N64 | Nintendo EAD | Nintendo | Action-adventure |
| 8 | Croc: Legend of the Gobbos | PS1 | Argonaut Software | Fox Interactive | Platformer |
| 9 | Yoshi's Story | N64 | Nintendo EAD | Nintendo | Platformer |
| 10 | Tekken 2 (Platinum) | PS1 | Namco | Sony | Fighting |

=== Highest-grossing arcade games in Japan ===
In Japan, the following titles were the highest-grossing arcade games of 1998.

| Rank | Gamest | | Game Machine | | |
| Rank | Title | Manufacturer | Title | Type | Points |
|---|---|---|---|---|---|
| 1 | Tekken 3 | Namco | Tekken 3 | Software | 4561 |
| 2 | Street Fighter Zero 3 (Street Fighter Alpha 3) | Capcom | Virtua Striker 2 / Ver. 98 | Software | 4366 |
| 3 | Marvel vs. Capcom: Clash of Super Heroes | Capcom | Print Club 2 | Other | 3534 |
| 4 | The King of Fighters '98 | SNK | The House of the Dead | Dedicated | 3334 |
| 5 | Virtua Fighter 3 Team Battle (Virtua Fighter 3tb) | Sega | Virtua Fighter 3 Team Battle | Dedicated | 2936 |
| 6 | The King of Fighters '97 | SNK | Sega Bass Fishing (Get Bass) | Dedicated | 2931 |
| 7 | Virtua Striker 2 | Sega | The Lost World: Jurassic Park | Dedicated | 2719 |
| 8 | Cyber Troopers Virtual-On Oratorio Tangram | Sega | Strikers 1945 II | Software | 2622 |
| 9 | Street Fighter EX2 | Capcom | Final Furlong | Dedicated | 2414 |
| 10 | Virtua Striker 2 Ver. 98 | Sega | The King of Fighters '97 | Software | 2377 |

== Events ==
- Academy of Interactive Arts & Sciences (AIAS) hosts its first annual Interactive Achievement Awards. Shigeru Miyamoto of Nintendo is inducted into the AIAS Hall of Fame.
- British Academy of Film and Television Arts hosts the first annual BAFTA Interactive Entertainment Awards.
- January 1 – The ESRB changes the "K-A" (Kids to Adults) rating to "E" (Everyone).
- March 14 – Sega announces the discontinuation of the Sega Saturn in North America to prepare for the launch of its successor, the Dreamcast.
- May:
  - 28 – Bill Williams, designer of Alley Cat, Necromancer, and Mind Walker, dies.
  - 28–30 – The fourth annual E3 is held in Atlanta, Georgia. Following the show, the inaugural Game Critics Awards was held with winners being titled Best of E3.
- July 3 – Danielle Bunten Berry, designer of M.U.L.E. and Seven Cities of Gold, dies.
- September 6 – Infogrames Entertainment, SA and Canal+ launch the Game One television channel.
- November 28 – Video game retailer FuncoLand opens its 300th location in Nashville, Tennessee.
- December – Take-Two Interactive forms the Rockstar Games publishing label.
- December 11 - The final Sega Saturn game is released in North America, Magic Knight Rayearth.

=== Business ===
- Activision acquires CD Contact Data and Head Games Publishing.
- Eidos Interactive acquires Crystal Dynamics.
- Electronic Arts Inc. acquires Westwood Studios, and with so they also acquire the North American operations of Virgin Interactive.
- JTS Corp. (Atari Corporation) files for Chapter 11 bankruptcy.
- Hasbro Interactive acquires the Atari brand and property from JTS in May. They also acquire MicroProse in August.
- Square Co. and Electronic Arts form Square Electronic Arts LLC to publish a wealth of Square Co. titles in the U.S.
- Havas, a subsidiary of Vivendi, acquires Cendant Software, which includes Sierra On-Line and Blizzard Entertainment.
- Lego Media established by Lego Group
- New companies: BreakAway, Elixir, Metro3D, Rockstar, Sunrise, Troika, WildTangent, Loki, Retro Studios
- Defunct: DWANGO

== Games released in 1998 ==
| Release date | Title | Platforms | Genres | Ref |
|---|---|---|---|---|
| January 5 | Robotron 64 | N64 | Shoot 'em up | |
| January 8 | No One Can Stop Mr. Domino! | PS1 | Puzzle | |
| January 12 | Marvel vs. Capcom: Clash of Super Heroes | Arcade | Fighting | |
| January 21 | Resident Evil 2 | PS1 | Survival horror | |
| January 22 | Machi | SAT | Visual novel | |
| January 29 | Bomberman World | PS1 | Action, maze | |
| January 29 | Bust a Groove | PS1 | Music, Fighting | |
| January 29 | NBA In The Zone '98 | PS1, N64 | Sports (basketball) | |
| January 29 | Panzer Dragoon Saga | SAT | Action-adventure, RPG | |
| February 6 | Skullmonkeys | PS1 | Platformer | |
| February 9 | James Bond 007 | GB | Action-adventure | |
| February 11 | Xenogears | PS1 | RPG | |
| February 23 | Metal Slug 2 | Arcade | Run and gun | |
| February 24 | Gex: Enter the Gecko | PS1 | Platformer | |
| February 25 | NCAA March Madness 98 | PS1 | Sports (basketball) | |
| February 25 | NHL Breakaway 98 | N64 | Sports (ice hockey) | |
| February 26 | Burning Rangers | SAT | Action, TPS | |
| February 26 | Tenchu: Stealth Assassins | PS1 | Action-adventure, Stealth | |
| February 26 | X-Men vs. Street Fighter: EX Edition | PS1 | Fighting | |
| February 28 | 1080° Snowboarding | N64 | Racing | |
| February 28 | Battlezone | WIN | FPS, RTS | |
| February 28 | San Francisco Rush: Extreme Racing | PS1 | Racing | |
| February 28 | Star Wars: Rebellion | WIN | RTS | |
| March 3 | X-Men: Children of the Atom | PS1 | Fighting | |
| March 9 | Wario Land II | GB | Platformer | |
| March 11 | NBA ShootOut 98 | PS1 | Sports (basketball) | |
| March 12 | Bushido Blade 2 | PS1 | Fighting | |
| March 12 | Dead or Alive | PS1 | Fighting | |
| March 18 | ReBoot | PS1 | Action | |
| March 20 | Real Bout Fatal Fury 2: The Newcomers | Arcade | Fighting | |
| March 24 | Quake | N64 | First-person shooter | |
| March 24 | Rascal | PS1 | Platformer | |
| March 25 | Need for Speed III: Hot Pursuit | PS1, WIN | Racing | |
| March 26 | Dungeon Master Nexus | SAT | RPG | |
| March 26 | G.A.S.P!! Fighters' NEXTream | N64 | Fighting | |
| March 26 | The House of the Dead | SAT | Rail shooter | |
| March 26 | The King of Fighters '97 | SAT | Fighting | |
| March 26 | Tekken 3 | PS1 | Fighting | |
| March 27 | Pitfall 3D: Beyond the Jungle | PS1 | Platformer | |
| March 29 | Parasite Eve | PS1 | Action RPG | |
| March 30 | Deathtrap Dungeon | PS1 | Action-adventure | |
| March 30 | Diablo | PS1 | Action RPG | |
| March 30 | Rampage World Tour | N64 | Action | |
| March 31 | Newman/Haas Racing | PS1 | Racing | |
| March 31 | StarCraft | WIN | RTS | |
| March 31 | Warhammer: Dark Omen | WIN | RTT | |
| April 1 | Atari Collection 2 | PS1 | Compilation | |
| April 4 | Sakura Wars 2: Thou Shalt Not Die | SAT | Tactical RPG, Dating sim, Visual novel | |
| April 7 | Warhammer: Dark Omen | PS1 | RTT | |
| April 9 | G-Darius | PS1 | Shoot 'em up | |
| April 14 | GT 64: Championship Edition | N64 | Racing | |
| April 16 | Blasto | PS1 | TPS | |
| April 17 | Puyo Puyo Sun | WIN | Puzzle | |
| April 24 | Forsaken | WIN | Shooter | |
| April 29 | Real Bout Fatal Fury 2: The Newcomers | NEO | Fighting | |
| April 29 | Shining Force III Scenario 2 – Target: Child of God | SAT | Tactical RPG | |
| April 29 | Super Tempo | SAT | Platformer | |
| April 30 | Bomberman Hero | N64 | Platformer | |
| April 30 | Might and Magic VI: The Mandate of Heaven | WIN | RPG | |
| May 7 | Jazz Jackrabbit 2 | WIN | Platformer | |
| May 12 | Forsaken | PS1 | Shooter | |
| May 13 | Redneck Rampage Rides Again | WIN | FPS | |
| May 19 | World Cup 98 | PS1, WIN, N64 | Sports (soccer) | |
| May 21 | Baroque | SAT | RPG | |
| May 22 | Forsaken | N64 | Shooter | |
| May 22 | Unreal | WIN | FPS | |
| May 28 | Radiant Silvergun | Arcade | Shoot 'em up | |
| May 28 | The King of Fighters '97 | PS1 | Fighting | |
| June 4 | Atelier Marie Plus | PS1 | RPG | |
| June 4 | International Superstar Soccer 98 | N64 | Sports (soccer) | |
| June 4 | Vigilante 8 | PS1 | Vehicular combat | |
| June 5 | Descent: FreeSpace – The Great War | WIN | Space combat simulation | |
| June 10 | Road Rash 3D | PS1 | Racing | |
| June 11 | Super Gem Fighter Mini Mix | PS1 | Fighting | |
| June 12 | Wetrix | N64 | Puzzle | |
| June 24 | Commandos: Behind Enemy Lines | WIN | RTT | |
| June 25 | Castlevania: Symphony of the Night | SAT | Action-adventure | |
| June 25 | Deathtrap Dungeon | WIN | Action-adventure | |
| June 26 | Cardinal Syn | PS1 | Fighting | |
| June 29 | Banjo-Kazooie | N64 | Platformer | |
| June 29 | Street Fighter Alpha 3 | Arcade | Fighting | |
| June 30 | Deep Fear | SAT | Survival horror | |
| June 30 | N2O: Nitrous Oxide | PS1 | Shoot 'em up | |
| July 4 | Heart of Darkness | PS1 | Platformer | |
| July 9 | Super Gem Fighter Mini Mix | SAT | Fighting | |
| July 14 | F-Zero X | N64 | Racing | |
| July 16 | Brave Fencer Musashi | PS1 | Action RPG | |
| July 16 | Hopkins FBI | WIN | Adventure | |
| July 23 | The King of Fighters '98 | Arcade | Fighting | |
| July 23 | Radiant Silvergun | SAT | Shoot 'em up | |
| July 23 | Real Bout Fatal Fury 2: The Newcomers | NEOCD | Fighting | |
| July 24 | WWF War Zone | PS1 | Sports (wrestling) | |
| July 30 | Soulcalibur | Arcade | Fighting | |
| July 30 | Star Ocean: The Second Story | PS1 | Action RPG | |
| July 31 | Urban Assault | WIN | FPS, RTS | |
| July 31 | F-1 World Grand Prix | N64 | Racing | |
| July 31 | Heart of Darkness | WIN | Platformer | |
| July 31 | Iggy's Reckin' Balls | N64 | Racing | |
| August 1 | Pocket Monsters Stadium | N64 | RPG | |
| August 4 | Batman & Robin | PS1 | Action-adventure | |
| August 6 | Point Blank 2 | PS1 | Light gun shooter | |
| August 6 | Resident Evil: Director's Cut – Dual Shock Version | PS1 | Survival horror | |
| August 6 | Wachenröder | SAT | Tactical RPG | |
| August 11 | WWF War Zone | N64 | Sports (wrestling) | |
| August 21 | Tom Clancy's Rainbow Six | WIN | Tactical shooter | |
| August 25 | Madden NFL 99 | PS1 | Sports (football) | |
| August 26 | Gex: Enter the Gecko | N64 | Platformer | |
| August 27 | Black/Matrix | SAT | Tactical RPG | |
| September 3 | Metal Gear Solid | PS1 | Action-adventure, Stealth | |
| September 9 | NASCAR 99 | N64 | Racing | |
| September 9 | NFL Blitz | N64 | Sports (football) | |
| September 10 | NFL Blitz | PS1 | Sports (football) | |
| September 10 | Spyro the Dragon | PS1 | Platformer | |
| September 12 | Pokémon Yellow | GB | RPG | |
| September 17 | Suikoden | SAT | RPG | |
| September 23 | Digital Monster Version S: Digimon Tamers | SAT | Virtual pet | |
| September 23 | Madden NFL 99 | N64 | Sports (football) | |
| September 23 | Shining Force III Scenario 3 – Bulzome Rising | SAT | Tactical RPG | |
| September 25 | Dragon Warrior Monsters | GBC | RPG | |
| September 26 | Dance Dance Revolution | Arcade | Music | |
| September 30 | Body Harvest | N64 | Action-adventure | |
| September 30 | Caesar III | WIN | City builder | |
| September 30 | Delta Force | WIN | Tactical shooter | |
| September 30 | Gex: Enter the Gecko | WIN | Platformer | |
| September 30 | NHL 99 | PS1, WIN | Sports (hockey) | |
| September 30 | Rogue Trip: Vacation 2012 | PS1 | Vehicular combat | |
| September 30 | Shogo: Mobile Armor Division | WIN | FPS | |
| October 1 | MediEvil | PS1 | Action-adventure | |
| October 1 | NHL 99 | N64 | Sports (hockey) | |
| October 2 | NFL Blitz | WIN | Sports (football) | |
| October 6 | Running Wild | PS1 | Racing | |
| October 12 | Need for Speed III: Hot Pursuit | WIN | Racing | |
| October 14 | Star Trek: The Next Generation: Klingon Honor Guard | WIN, MAC | FPS | |
| October 21 | Turok 2: Seeds of Evil | N64 | FPS | |
| October 21 | Tetris DX | GBC | Puzzle | |
| October 21 | Wario Land II | GBC | Platformer | |
| October 22 | Marvel Super Heroes vs. Street Fighter | SAT | Fighting | |
| October 28 | Grim Fandango | WIN | Adventure | |
| October 28 | Newman/Haas Racing | WIN | Racing | |
| October 28 | Trespasser | WIN | Action-adventure | |
| October 29 | Fallout 2 | WIN | RPG | |
| October 30 | The Fifth Element | WIN, PS1 | Action-adventure | |
| October 31 | Age of Empires: The Rise of Rome | WIN | RTS | |
| October 31 | Apocalypse | PS1 | TPS | |
| October 31 | Centipede | WIN | Shoot 'em up | |
| October 31 | FIFA 99 | WIN | Sports (soccer) | |
| October 31 | Glover | N64, WIN | Platformer | |
| October 31 | Heretic II | WIN | Action-adventure | |
| October 31 | NBA Live 99 | PS1, WIN | Sports (basketball) | |
| October 31 | Oddworld: Abe's Exoddus | PS1, WIN | Platformer | |
| October 31 | Railroad Tycoon II | WIN | Business Sim | |
| November 1 | Red Comrades Save the Galaxy | WIN | Adventure | |
| November 3 | Crash Bandicoot: Warped | PS1 | Platformer | |
| November 4 | NBA Live 99 | N64 | Sports (basketball) | |
| November 5 | Nancy Drew: Secrets Can Kill | WIN | Adventure | |
| November 9 | SiN | WIN | FPS | |
| November 10 | Rush 2: Extreme Racing USA | N64 | Racing | |
| November 11 | Sonic R | WIN | Racing | |
| November 14 | The Elder Scrolls Adventures: Redguard | WIN | Action-adventure | |
| November 19 | Half-Life | WIN | FPS | |
| November 20 | The Settlers III | WIN | RTS, City builder | |
| November 20 | Tomb Raider III | PS1, WIN | Action-adventure | |
| November 21 | The Legend of Zelda: Ocarina of Time | N64 | Action-adventure | |
| November 23 | Gex: Enter the Gecko | GBC | Platformer | |
| November 25 | Blood II: The Chosen | WIN | FPS | |
| November 27 | Puyo Puyo Sun | GBC | Puzzle | |
| November 30 | FIFA 99 | PS1, N64 | Sports (soccer) | |
| December | Pitfall: Beyond the Jungle | GBC | Platformer | |
| December 1 | Thief: The Dark Project | WIN | Stealth | |
| December 3 | Star Wars: Rogue Squadron | WIN | Action | |
| December 4 | Magic and Mayhem | WIN | RTS | |
| December 7 | Star Wars: Rogue Squadron | N64 | Action | |
| December 12 | Falcon 4.0 | WIN | Air combat simulation | |
| December 12 | Hey You, Pikachu! | N64 | Virtual pet | |
| December 12 | The Legend of Zelda: Link's Awakening DX | GBC | Action-adventure | |
| December 17 | Suikoden II | PS1 | RPG | |
| December 18 | Mario Party | N64 | Party | |
| December 18 | Pokémon Trading Card Game | GBC | DCCG | |
| December 18 | StarCraft: Brood War | WIN | RTS | |
| December 21 | Baldur's Gate | WIN | RPG | |
| December 21 | South Park | N64 | FPS | |
| December 23 | Chocobo's Mystery Dungeon 2 | PS1 | Roguelike | |
| December 23 | Sonic Adventure | DC | Platformer | |
| December 23 | Starsiege: Tribes | WIN | FPS | |
| December 28 | Myth II: Soulblighter | WIN | RTT | |
| December 31 | Akuji the Heartless | PS1 | Action-adventure | |

== See also ==
- 1998 in games
