= NFL Blitz '99 =

1998 video game

- Developer(s): Midway Games
- Publisher(s): Midway Games
- Series: NFL Blitz
- Platform(s): Arcade
- Release: 1998
- Genre(s): Sports (American football)
- Mode(s): Single-player, multiplayer

NFL Blitz '99 is an arcade style sports video game. Released in 1998, it was the second game in the NFL Blitz series. The game was released for arcade play.

== Gameplay ==
NFL Blitz '99 supports up to four human players.

The arcade cabinet has a slot on the side for a Nintendo 64 Controller Pak to load created plays from the Nintendo 64 version of NFL Blitz.

== Reception ==
In 1999, Next Generation listed NFL Blitz '99 as number 33 on their "Top 50 Games of All Time", commenting that, "The enhanced graphics, and great voice-overs makes this one of the best arcade games we've played, and the ability to create plays on an N64 and use them in the arcade adds to the playability even more." In 2003, NFL Blitz '99 was inducted into GameSpot's list of the greatest games of all time.
