= NHL 99 =

1998 video game

- Cover art featuring Eric Lindros
- Developers: EA Canada (PS/PC); MBL Research (N64)
- Publisher: EA Sports
- Producer: Ken Sayler
- Series: NHL
- Engine: Virtual Stadium
- Platforms: PlayStation, Windows, Nintendo 64
- Release: PlayStation, Windows: NA: September 28, 1998; EU: 1998; Nintendo 64: NA: October 1, 1998; EU: November 30, 1998
- Genre: Sports (ice hockey)
- Modes: Single-player, multiplayer

NHL 99 is an ice hockey video game developed by Electronic Arts Canada. It was released in September 1998 and was the successor to NHL 98.

== Gameplay ==
Starting with NHL 99 up to NHL 2001, there were very few large improvements to the game. NHL 99 for the PlayStation boasted higher-resolution graphics than NHL 98, but the framerate and unresponsive controls (especially in 2+ player modes) hindered its playability. Online leagues of the game also became more organized. Daryl Reaugh left the series as color commentator following NHL 99. In the Nintendo 64 version of NHL 99, the official NHL and NHLPA license with all teams and players are represented, including the Nashville Predators expansion team. It has a medium-high resolution at 30 FP, rumble-pack support, and four player mode. The commentary is done by ESPN's Bill Clement.

== Reception ==
Reception

Aggregate score
| Aggregator | Score | | |
| Aggregator | N64 | PC | PS |
|---|---|---|---|
| GameRankings | 84% | 88% | 80% |

Review scores
| Publication | Score | | |
| Publication | N64 | PC | PS |
|---|---|---|---|
| CNET Gamecenter | 8/10 | 8/10 | N/A |
| Computer Gaming World | N/A | 5/5 | N/A |
| Electronic Gaming Monthly | 8/10 | N/A | 7.67/10 |
| Game Informer | 8.25/10 | N/A | 9/10 |
| GameFan | N/A | N/A | 92% |
| GamePro | 5/5 (Note: GamePro gave the Nintendo 64 version two 5/5 scores for graphics and overall fun factor, 4/5 for sound, and 4.5/5 for control.) | 4.5/5 (Note: GamePro gave the PC version two 3.5/5 scores for graphics and sound, and two 4.5/5 scores for control and overall fun factor.) | 4.5/5 (Note: GamePro gave the PlayStation version two 4.5/5 scores for graphics and overall fun factor, and two 5/5 scores for sound and control.) |
| GameRevolution | A− | B | B+ |
| GameSpot | 7.9/10 | 8.4/10 | 8.4/10 |
| IGN | 8.8/10 | 9/10 | 8.9/10 |
| N64 Magazine | 74% | N/A | N/A |
| Next Generation | N/A | 5/5 | 2/5 |
| Nintendo Power | 7.6/10 | N/A | N/A |
| Official U.S. PlayStation Magazine | N/A | N/A | 4.5/5 |
| PC Accelerator | N/A | 9/10 | N/A |
| PC Gamer (US) | N/A | 91% | N/A |
| The Cincinnati Enquirer | N/A | 4.5/5 | N/A |

The game received "favorable" reviews on all platforms according to the review aggregation website GameRankings. AllGame gave the PlayStation version four stars out of five, saying that it "isn't a Stanley Cup winner yet, but there is still an undeniable amount of fun to be had if you're willing to except [sic] a few flaws." Likewise, Official UK PlayStation Magazine gave it a similar score of eight out of ten, saying that the game "manages to succeed in bettering its predecessor. But, be warned, you have to really play it to get the most out of it. Patience is key." Hyper gave the Nintendo 64 version 81%, saying, "while NHL 99's controls aren't executed quite as well as they could have been, the hard-hitting action combined with glossy NHL logos and statistics makes it a worthwhile purchase for any recreational follower of the sport." N64 Magazine gave the same console version 74%, saying that it was "by no means dire." Jeff Lackey of Computer Games Strategy Plus gave the Windows version three stars out of five, saying, "By making the goalies behave in the way they do, a player has two choices when playing NHL 99: play at Rookie level and quickly learn to win every game by a wide margin, or play at Pro level and accept the inability of your players to score standard NHL style goals against computer super-goalies. Perhaps the great graphics and sounds will be enough for some to overcome this deficiency; however, it's unlikely this will be the case for anyone who actually follows the NHL and wants a real hockey simulation."

Next Generation said of the PlayStation version in its January 1999 issue, "What EA has given us this year is more of an attempt at a purist hockey game rather than the intense hockey experience they have delivered before. While a purist hockey game is certainly not a bad thing, it's just not that much fun to play, and that's the bottom line." One issue later, however, the magazine changed its tune and called the Windows version "the best-looking hockey game on the PC." In the same issue, the magazine listed the same Windows version as well as the N64 version at #40 on its list of the Fifty Best Games of All Time, saying, "The control is fantastic and the company has managed to balance the gameplay perfectly between arcade and simulation. It feels real, but it is never tedious, as realistic simulations tend to be."

The Electric Playground nominated the Windows version for their 1998 "Best Computer Game" award, which ultimately went to Half-Life. The game won the "Best Hockey Game" award as well; the Official Broadcast Overlays and Up To The Minute Stats were nominated for "Best Easter Eggs or Extras", which ultimately went to the Batmobile from Need for Speed 3. It was also nominated for PC PowerPlay's "Best Sports" award, which went to FIFA 99, and for the "Best Sports Game of the Year" award at IGN's Best of 1998 Awards, which ultimately went to NFL Blitz.
