= NFL Blitz (2012 video game) =

- Developer: EA Tiburon
- Publisher: EA Sports
- Series: NFL Blitz
- Platforms: PlayStation Network, Xbox Live Arcade
- Release: PSN: NA: January 3, 2012; XBLA: NA: January 4, 2012
- Genre: Sports
- Modes: Single player, multiplayer

NFL Blitz is a downloadable video game by EA Sports featuring the teams of the National Football League. It is a reboot of the NFL Blitz series, the first Blitz game officially sponsored by the NFL after a number of releases in the Blitz series which did not bear the NFL's official license. It was released in North American territories in January 2012 on both PlayStation Network and Xbox Live Arcade. Baltimore Ravens running back Ray Rice was selected to be the virtual cover athlete of the game. Play by play commentary was provided by Tim Kitzrow and color commentary by Brian Haley.

== Development ==
Following the liquidation of Midway Games in 2009, EA Sports acquired the NFL Blitz intellectual property. In order to emulate the original gameplay elements, EA Tiburon held tournaments with the original arcade version of NFL Blitz.

EA Tiburon worked in relation with the NFL. While the league was supportive of many gameplay elements, they did request that late hits be removed from the game due to their stance on player health and safety.

== Reception ==
Reception

Aggregate score
Aggregator	Score	
Aggregator	PS3	Xbox 360
Metacritic	80/100	78/100

Review scores
Publication	Score	
Publication	PS3	Xbox 360
Destructoid	N/A	8/10
Electronic Gaming Monthly	N/A	6.5/10
Game Informer	8/10	8/10
GameSpot	N/A	7/10
GameTrailers	N/A	7.9/10
GameZone	9/10	9/10
IGN	8.5/10	8.5/10
Joystiq	N/A	4.5/5
Official Xbox Magazine (US)	N/A	7.5/10
PlayStation: The Official Magazine	8/10	N/A
411Mania	9.5/10	9.5/10
The A.V. Club	N/A	B−

The game received "favorable" reviews on both platforms according to the review aggregation website Metacritic.
