= NFL Blitz 2000 =

1999 video game

- Developers: Midway Games (Note: Ported to PlayStation by Midway Studios San Diego, PC by Point of View, and Dreamcast by Avalanche Software); Digital Eclipse (GBC)
- Publishers: Midway; Infogrames (PC)
- Series: NFL Blitz
- Platforms: Arcade, PlayStation, Nintendo 64, Dreamcast, Windows, Game Boy Color
- Release: 1999: Arcade; NA: 1999; NA: 1999 (Gold Edition) Nintendo 64, PlayStation; NA: August 18, 1999; EU: 1999 (PS) Dreamcast; NA: September 9, 1999; UK: December 8, 1999 Windows; NA: November 3, 1999 Game Boy Color; NA: December 8, 1999
- Genre: Sports
- Modes: Single-player, multiplayer

NFL Blitz 2000 is a video game released in the arcades in 1999 and then ported to the PlayStation, Nintendo 64, Dreamcast, Windows, and Game Boy Color. It is the third game in the NFL Blitz series.

== Development ==
The game was announced for the Dreamcast in December 1998. It was showcased at E3 1999.

== Reception ==
Reception

Aggregate scores
Aggregator	Score				
Aggregator	Dreamcast	GBC	N64	PC	PS
GameRankings	82%	40%	84%	68%	86%
Metacritic	N/A	N/A	85/100	N/A	N/A

Review scores
Publication	Score				
Publication	Dreamcast	GBC	N64	PC	PS
CNET Gamecenter	8/10	N/A	7/10	6/10	9/10
Computer Gaming World	N/A	N/A	N/A	3.5/5	N/A
Electronic Gaming Monthly	8.625/10 (Note: In Electronic Gaming Monthly's review of the Dreamcast version, two critics gave it each a score of 9/10, one gave it 8/10, and another gave it 8.5/10.)	N/A	7.875/10 (Note: In Electronic Gaming Monthly's review of the Nintendo 64 version, two critics gave it each a score of 7.5/10, one gave it 8/10, and another gave it 8.5/10.)	N/A	N/A
Game Informer	9/10	N/A	7.75/10	N/A	6.5/10
GameFan	91% (Note: In GameFan's viewpoint of the Dreamcast version, one critic gave it 90, and the other 91.)	N/A	87% (Note: In GameFan's viewpoint of the Nintendo 64 version, one critic gave it 89, and the other 85.)	N/A	88% (Note: In GameFan's viewpoint of the PlayStation version, one critic gave it 88, and the other 87.)
GameRevolution	B	N/A	B	N/A	B
GameSpot	8.7/10	N/A	8.7/10	4.8/10	8.5/10
GameSpy	8.5/10	N/A	N/A	N/A	N/A
IGN	8.3/10	2/10	9.2/10	8/10	8.6/10
Next Generation	3/5	N/A	N/A	N/A	N/A
Nintendo Power	N/A	N/A	8.7/10	N/A	N/A
Official U.S. PlayStation Magazine	N/A	N/A	N/A	N/A	5/5
PC Accelerator	N/A	N/A	N/A	5/10	N/A
PC Gamer (US)	N/A	N/A	N/A	48%	N/A

The Nintendo 64 version received "favorable" reviews according to the review aggregation website Metacritic. Hugh Norton-Smith of Hyper gave the same console version 91% and stated, "Unless you are a hardcore statistics fanatic, Blitz 2000 is a 5-star title worthy of anyone's cash. I wait for the next installment with bated breath and a case of Budweiser." Steve Bauman of Computer Games Strategy Plus gave the PC version four stars out of five, saying, "It's just that sort of attitude that shows NFL Blitz 2000 is ultimately bad for you. It'll make you relish those late hits, laugh at those painful groin injuries and pulled hamstrings, and give your game pad the fiercest workout imaginable. But it's still, in the words of the in-game announcer, 'totally uncalled for, but awfully fun to watch.'" Michael Lafferty of GameZone gave the same PC version 6.9 out of 10, calling it "a nice diversion from the games geared to the hard-core fans." Tom Russo of NextGen said that the Dreamcast version was "As fast and fun as it ever was, but lacking the depth and one-player replayability of Sega's own NFL 2K."

Christopher Michael Baker of AllGame gave the PlayStation version four stars out of five, saying, "Despite its lack of original content, NFL Blitz 2000 is still one of the most enjoyable gaming experiences -- sports-related or otherwise -- that you'll have on your PlayStation." Anthony Baize gave the Nintendo 64 version three-and-a-half stars, saying that it was "a fun game to play, but there is not significant improvement over the original NFL Blitz. Basically, the only real reason to pick up this game is if you did not buy the original or if you simply must have the updated rosters for the 1999-2000 NFL season. It's fun to play, but it is not a legitimate upgrade." Scott Alan Marriott gave the Dreamcast version three stars, saying, "It's brainless, it has devious computer AI, and it's lacking in depth, but there's just something about the fast-paced intensity that makes the game appealing in spite of its flaws. Factor in the ability to play with up to three of your friends, and you also have one of the best multi-player experiences available at the Dreamcast's launch. So yes, this is the definitive version of NFL Blitz fans have been waiting for, but anyone expecting a huge step up from the 'lesser' console versions will be sorely disappointed." However, Brad Cook gave the PC version two stars, calling it "a faithful port of the Arcade version which is unfortunately nothing more than that, and it requires users to have a system which is well above and beyond the specs listed on the box." He also gave the Game Boy Color version one-and-a-half stars, calling it "a game that really should have never been translated to this system in the first place. The very idea behind it can only work on comparatively higher-end machines such as PCs, Nintendo 64s, Dreamcasts and Arcade units. Anything with less power and you're left without what made the original so great in the first place."

Scary Larry of GamePro said, "Blitz 2000 for the Dreamcast is a great upgrade of the original game, and a must have if the only system you plan on owning is a Dreamcast. But for real football fun, there's no competing with NFL 2K. Blitz 2000 doesn't want that competition - just a chance to hurt someone badly." (Note: GamePro gave the Dreamcast version 4.5/5 for graphics, two 4/5 scores for sound and overall fun factor, and 3.5/5 for control.) Boba Fatt said that the Nintendo 64 version "still suffers from a lack of single-player replayability, but the multiplayer mayhem makes for a blitzin' good time." (Note: GamePro gave the Nintendo 64 version two 5/5 scores for graphics and sound, 3.5/5 for control, and 4/5 for overall fun factor in one review.) He also said of the PlayStation version, "For the single player, Blitz is still a short-lived thrill ride with little replay value–the A.I., though improved, still resorts to cheating consistently and the hardest difficulty level is full of fumble-itis. Blitz is meant to be a multiplayer experience, however, and in that area it's an all-pro." (Note: GamePro gave the PlayStation version three 5/5 scores for graphics, sound, and control, and 4.5/5 for overall fun factor in one review.) Scary Larry called the same Nintendo 64 version "just the kind of game for people that thought NBA Hangtime, Open Ice, and WWF Arcade were as real as they need in a sports game." (Note: GamePro gave the Nintendo 64 version 4/5 for graphics, sound, control, and overall fun factor in another review.) He also called the same PlayStation version a "season ticket to fun." (Note: GamePro gave the PlayStation version three 4.5/5 scores for graphics, control and overall fun factor, and 4/5 for sound in another review.)
