= NFL Blitz Pro =

2003 video game

- Cover art for GameCube featuring San Francisco 49ers wide receiver Terrell Owens
- Developer: Midway Games
- Publisher: Midway Sports
- Director: Mark Turmell
- Producer: Mark Smith
- Designer: Dan Baker
- Programmers: Josh Williams; Aaron Walker
- Artist: Jennifer Hedrick
- Composers: Rich Carle; Dan Forden; Chase Ashbaker
- Series: NFL Blitz
- Platforms: PlayStation 2, Xbox, GameCube
- Release: PlayStation 2: NA: October 27, 2003; Xbox: NA: November 4, 2003; GameCube: NA: December 2, 2003
- Genre: Sports (American football)
- Modes: Single-player, multiplayer

NFL Blitz Pro is an American football video game developed by Midway Games for GameCube, PlayStation 2 and Xbox in 2003.

== Reception ==
Reception

Aggregate score
Aggregator	Score		
Aggregator	GameCube	PS2	Xbox
Metacritic	71/100	73/100	71/100

Review scores
Publication	Score		
Publication	GameCube	PS2	Xbox
Electronic Gaming Monthly	6.67/10	6.67/10	6.67/10
Game Informer	N/A	7.25/10	N/A
GameSpot	6.5/10	6.7/10	6.5/10
GameSpy	N/A	3/5	3/5
GameZone	7.7/10	8.9/10	7.8/10
IGN	8/10	8/10	8/10
Nintendo Power	2.7/5	N/A	N/A
Official U.S. PlayStation Magazine	N/A	3/5	N/A
TeamXbox	N/A	N/A	6.2/10
X-Play	N/A	2/5	N/A

The game received "average" reviews on all platforms according to the review aggregation website Metacritic.

The game sold about 130,000 copies.
