= NFL Blitz 2003 =

2002 video game

NFL Blitz 20-03
- Developers: Midway Amusement Games; Point of View; OutLook Entertainment (GBA)
- Publisher: Midway Sports
- Director: Mike Michaels
- Producers: Mark Flitman; Mark Smith
- Designers: Dan Baker; Mark Turmell; John Walsh
- Programmers: Thomas Rolfe; Josh Williams; Aaron Walker
- Artists: Eddie Rainwater; Tim Holtermann; Scott Rodenhizer; Alan Cruz
- Composers: Rich Carle; Dan Forden; Rob Martino
- Series: NFL Blitz
- Platforms: Game Boy Advance, GameCube, PlayStation 2, Xbox
- Release: NA: August 12, 2002
- Genre: Sports (American football)
- Modes: Single-player, multiplayer

NFL Blitz 20-03 is an American football video game published by Midway Sports for Game Boy Advance, GameCube, PlayStation 2 and Xbox in 2002.

== Reception ==
Reception

Aggregate score
Aggregator	Score			
Aggregator	GBA	GameCube	PS2	Xbox
Metacritic	33/100	72/100	73/100	72/100

Review scores
Publication	Score			
Publication	GBA	GameCube	PS2	Xbox
Electronic Gaming Monthly	N/A	N/A	7.17/10	N/A
Game Informer	N/A	N/A	5.25/10	N/A
GameSpot	7/10	8/10	8.3/10	8/10
GameSpy	N/A	3/5	3/5	3/5
GameZone	N/A	N/A	9/10	N/A
IGN	1/10	7.8/10	7.8/10	7.8/10
Nintendo Power	N/A	3.4/5	N/A	N/A
Nintendo World Report	N/A	7/10	N/A	N/A
Official U.S. PlayStation Magazine	N/A	N/A	3.5/5	N/A
Official Xbox Magazine (US)	N/A	N/A	N/A	6.5/10
Maxim	N/A	3.5/5	3.5/5	3.5/5

The game received "average" reviews on all platforms except the Game Boy Advance version, which received "unfavorable" reviews, according to the review aggregation website Metacritic.

It was a runner-up for GameSpot's annual "Best Game No One Played on GameCube" award, which went to Sega Soccer Slam.

== See also ==
- Madden NFL 2003
- NFL 2K3
- NFL Fever 2003
- NFL GameDay 2003
