= World Cup 98 (video game) =

1998 video game

- North American PlayStation cover art
- Developers: EA Canada; Software Creations (N64); Tiertex Design Studios (Game Boy)
- Publishers: EA Sports; THQ (Game Boy)
- Series: FIFA World Cup
- Platforms: Game Boy, Nintendo 64, PlayStation, Windows
- Release: NA: 19 May 1998; UK: 22 May 1998 Game Boy June 1998
- Genre: Football/Soccer
- Modes: Single-player, multiplayer

World Cup 98 is a football video game released in 1998 to coincide with that year's FIFA World Cup football tournament, developed by EA Canada and published by Electronic Arts under their EA Sports label. It is the first official FIFA World Cup game developed by EA Sports after obtaining the rights from FIFA in 1997. Unlike the previous World Cup games, which were in 2D and showed a bird's-eye view, World Cup 98 used a 3D engine, utilising DirectX for the PC version.

Accurate national team kits (except for the goalkeepers who were issued a generic kit) were introduced complete with kit manufacturer logos and official merchandise. The game engine is based on that of FIFA: Road to World Cup 98, though it features some minor gameplay improvements to areas such as in-game strategy changing and player positioning. The playable teams in the friendly mode also included several nations that did not qualify for the finals.

World Cup 98 was released for Microsoft Windows, PlayStation and Nintendo 64. A version developed by Tiertex Design Studios and published by THQ was also released for the Game Boy. The intro song to the game is Chumbawamba's "Tubthumping."

== Game modes ==
In-game screenshot of a match between Argentina and Brazil

The main feature of the game is the World Cup tournament itself, where the player may use either the actual groups used in the finals, or groups composed of a random selection of the 40 included teams. Each match takes place in a recreation of the venue it was played in the actual tournament. As in the real tournament, group games do not go to extra time or a penalty shoot-out but knockout matches do.

At the end of each match, a caption shows the man of the match award, and if applicable a clean sheet caption. At the end of the "World Cup" game mode, captions show the winner of the Golden Boot for most goals scored during the tournament and winner of the FIFA Fair Play Award, two awards which are given in the real World Cup.

It is also possible to play friendly matches between any of the teams that are included in the game. At the end of a drawn game the player can choose to finish the match as a draw, play extra time with the golden goal rule, or take part in a penalty shoot-out.

As in FIFA: Road to World Cup 98, national squads can be customised to reflect the actual tournament's players by including players from a reserves pool in the "customise" option.

The "World Cup Classics" mode allows the player to play fifteen classic FIFA World Cup matches. The 1982 match is unlocked by winning the "World Cup" mode, and by completing each unlocked game, the next one is unlocked in the order shown below. "World Cup Classics" mode features accurate period team kits (except for the goalies), hairstyles and names, and commentary for this mode only was provided by Kenneth Wolstenholme, the BBC's commentator during the 1966 and 1970 FIFA World Cup. For the 1950, 1954, and 1966 World Cup Final matches in this mode, the graphics are in black and white, as they were shown on television at the time. The 1930 and 1938 matches are shown using sepia tone graphics. In matches that took place prior to the introduction of substitutions, it is not possible to change a player during the match (however, this also applies to the 1970 final, which was when substitutions became the rule). Other historical inaccuracies include cards being awarded to players in matches prior to 1970 and the use of brown leather balls for matches from 1970 onwards, in lieu of balls like the Adidas Telstar (for 1970 and 1974) and the Adidas Tango España (for the 1982 final). The United Kingdom version of the game features commentary from John Motson and Chris Waddle, with matches introduced by Des Lynam and Gary Lineker.

== Teams ==
The game features every team that qualified for the 1998 FIFA World Cup, as well as eight others who did not: Australia, Canada, China, Greece, Portugal, Republic of Ireland, Russia and Sweden. All teams are featured with their authentic kits.

== Development and release ==
In 1996, EA Sports obtained exclusive rights to use the 1998 World Cup in video games published anywhere except Japan.

In Japan, the PlayStation version was ported and published by Electronic Arts Square under the name of FIFA World Cup 98: France Sōshūhen (FIFA ワールドカップ98 〜フランス総集編〜, FIFA Wārudo Kappu 98 〜Furansu Sōshūhen〜; lit. "FIFA World Cup 98: France Overall Compile Collection") on 5 November 1998.

== Reception ==
Reception

Aggregate score
| Aggregator | Score | | | |
| Aggregator | Game Boy | N64 | PC | PS |
|---|---|---|---|---|
| GameRankings | N/A | 85% | 76% | 80% |

Review scores
| Publication | Score | | | |
| Publication | Game Boy | N64 | PC | PS |
|---|---|---|---|---|
| CNET Gamecenter | N/A | 8/10 | 8/10 | 8/10 |
| Computer Gaming World | N/A | N/A | 4.5/5 | N/A |
| Computer and Video Games | 1/5 | 4/5 | 4/5 | 4/5 |
| Electronic Gaming Monthly | N/A | 7.75/10 (Note: Three critics of Electronic Gaming Monthly gave the Nintendo 64 version each a score of 8/10, and the other gave it 7/10.) | N/A | 7.375/10 (Note: In Electronic Gaming Monthly's review of the PlayStation version, one critic gave it 7/10, another gave it 6.5/10, and the rest gave it each a score of 8/10.) |
| Famitsu | N/A | N/A | N/A | 30/40 |
| Game Informer | 3/10 | 8/10 | N/A | N/A |
| GameFan | N/A | 89% (Note: In GameFan's viewpoint of the Nintendo 64 version, one critic gave it 89, and the other 88.) | N/A | 90% (Note: In GameFan's viewpoint of the PlayStation version, one critic gave it 88, and the other 91.) |
| GameRevolution | N/A | B+ | N/A | A− |
| GameSpot | N/A | 8.6/10 | 8.8/10 | 8.6/10 |
| IGN | N/A | 8.8/10 | N/A | 8/10 |
| Next Generation | N/A | N/A | N/A | 4/5 |
| Nintendo Power | N/A | 8.1/10 | N/A | N/A |
| Official U.S. PlayStation Magazine | N/A | N/A | N/A | 3/5 |
| PC Accelerator | N/A | N/A | 8/10 | N/A |

The game received favourable reviews on all platforms according to the review aggregation website GameRankings. Next Generation said of the PlayStation version, "Released to coincide with the recent World Cup frenzy, Electronic Arts' World Cup 98 is technically a winner. The game delivers fast reactions to controller commands, realistic player movement, clean graphics, an excellent soundtrack, and adrenaline-pumping excitement."

Jeff Lackey of Computer Games Strategy Plus gave the PC version all fives stars, saying, "If you don't have FIFA 98, the decision is clear—if you are a soccer fan, or any type of computer sports fan at all, you will love World Cup 98. If you have FIFA 98, the decision is a bit trickier as the improvements are subtle but significant—you will likely find the improved player and goalie AI and the wonderful recreation of the World Cup atmosphere well worth the price of admission." Warren Christmas of PC Zone gave the same PC version 91%, saying, "World Cup 98 is quite simply the finest football game on the PC; the perfect accompaniment to the tournament. Not so meat and gravy, then, as a succulent chicken in white wine sauce (or something). Gorge yourself on it." Brad Cook of AllGame gave the same PC version four stars out of five, saying, "Overall, you'll love this game if you're a soccer fan and [you] will still enjoy it even if you like sports games but aren't a big soccer player. Novice players will find it easy to play (scoring goals isn't very hard on amateur level) while experts will like the wealth of options available for them to play with." However, Edge gave the same PC version seven out of ten, saying, "Ultimately, WC '98's basic core of gameplay remains unchanged. For RTWC '98 owners, it's a purchase for the completist or the extravagant; for the uninitiated few, an opportunity to see a commercially evergreen franchise in rare form."

Cam Shea of Hyper gave the N64, PlayStation and PC versions each 90%, calling the game "a superb game, but think twice if you already own FIFA 98." James Ashton of N64 Magazine gave the N64 version 73%, calling it a "highly desirable license, [but a] flawed game."

Air Hendrix of GamePro said of the Nintendo 64 version, "Although World Cup's a better-playing game than FIFA, it has less variety, and its refinements aren't exactly huge. Casual soccer gamers should definitely rent before springing for another game—especially since the release of International Superstar Soccer 98 is just around the corner, and who knows how that'll score. [sic]" (Note: GamePro gave the Nintendo 64 version 5/5 for graphics, 4/5 for sound, and two 4.5/5 scores for control and fun factor.) The Rookie of the same magazine said of the PlayStation version, "When the final whistle sounds, World Cup '98 is an extremely fun and challenging soccer game, and one of the best on the market. While some excellent improvements have been made over the recently released FIFA '98: Road to World Cup [sic], if you already own that title (and unless you're a total soccer nut), you probably won't need to make another soccer purchase." (Note: GamePro gave the PlayStation version two 4.5/5 scores for graphics and sound, and two 5/5 scores for control and fun factor.) Electronic Gaming Monthly's four reviewers similarly said that while the improvements were significant, they were not enough to justify buying the game for players who already owned FIFA 98, nor enough to make it as good as International Superstar Soccer 64, which was released for the Nintendo 64 the previous year.

The PlayStation version was a bestseller in the UK. At the 1999 Milia festival in Cannes, it took home a "Gold" prize for revenues above €48 million in the European Union during the previous year. PC Guide's July 1998 issue named World Cup 98 as the winner of a group test involving other PC football games around at the same time, ahead of competitors such as Actua Soccer 2, Three Lions and Sensible Soccer '98. The magazine described the game as "Simply the best football game in the world."

The PC version was a finalist for Computer Games Strategy Plus' 1998 "Sports Game of the Year" award, which ultimately went to Grand Prix Legends. The staff called the game "superb, a tour de force of soccer simulation." Likewise, the same PC version won the "Best Sports" award (along with FIFA: Road to World Cup 98 and FIFA 99, collectively) at Computer Gaming World's 1999 Premier Awards.

== See also ==
- FIFA World Cup video games
- FIFA (video game series)
