= NFL Blitz =

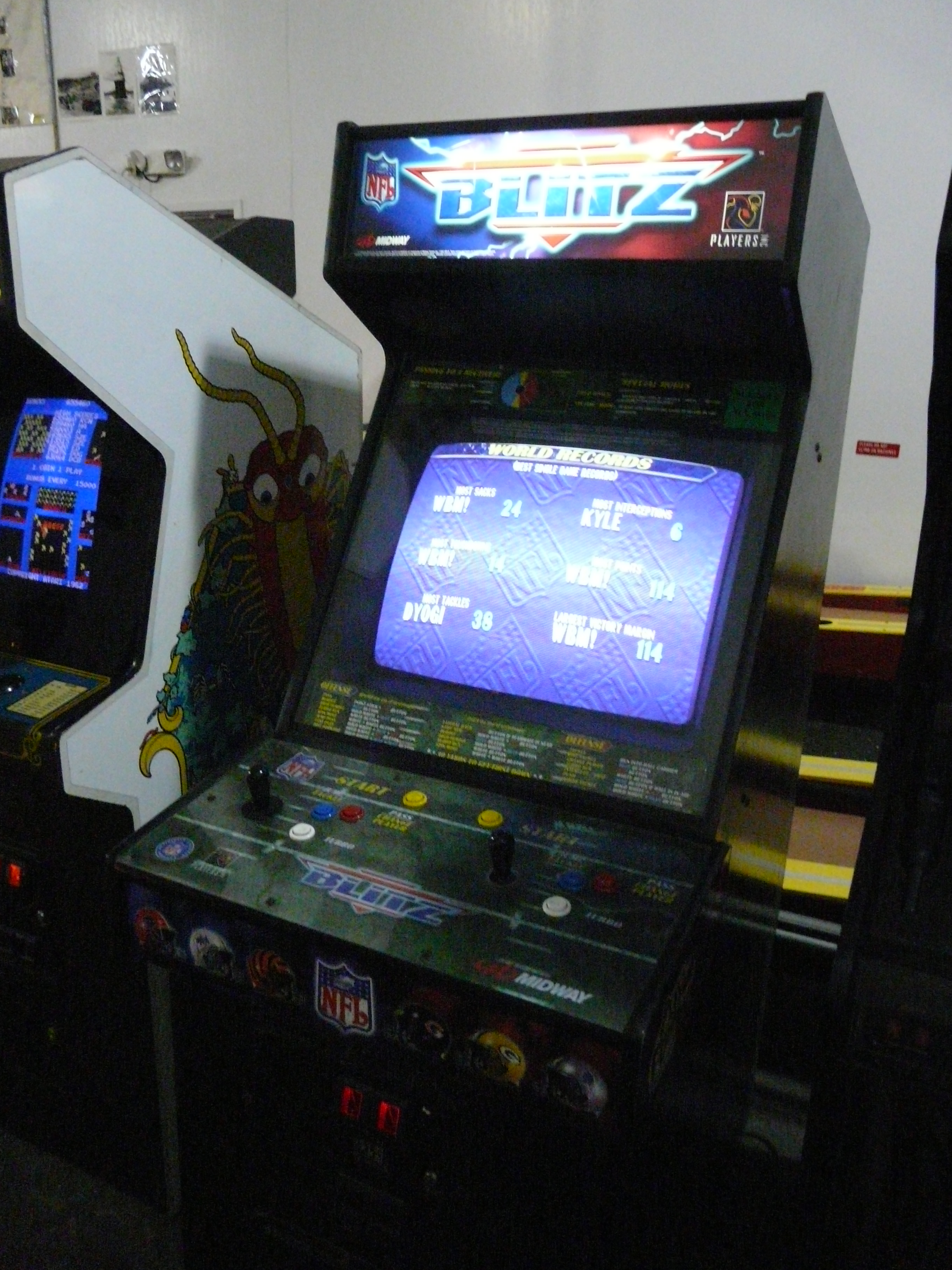
- NFL Blitz arcade cabinet
- Genre: Sports
- Developers: Midway Games, EA Sports
- Publishers: Midway Games, EA Sports
- Platforms: Arcade, Nintendo 64, PlayStation, Game Boy Color, Microsoft Windows, Dreamcast, PlayStation 2, Xbox, GameCube, Game Boy Advance, PlayStation 3, Xbox 360
- First release: NFL Blitz (1997); 1997
- Latest release: NFL Blitz (2012); 2012

NFL Blitz (also known as Blitz) is a series of American football themed video game originally released by Midway featuring National Football League (NFL) teams. It began as a 1997 arcade game NFL Blitz that was ported to home consoles and spawned a series of sequels. Rather than being designed as a realistic interpretation of the sport of football, like Madden NFL or NFL 2K, the Blitz series was created as an over-the-top, exaggerated version of the sport, inspired by Midway's own NBA Jam basketball game.

In 2005, after Electronic Arts acquired the then fully exclusive NFL video game license, Midway relaunched the Blitz series as Blitz: The League, depicting fictional players and teams in a fictional league with slightly more realistic (though still exaggerated) on-field play and a focus on the seedy behind-the-scenes lives of the players.

Following the dissolution of Midway, EA Sports acquired the rights to the Blitz name and relaunched the series on PlayStation Network and Xbox Live with a new entry in the series simply titled NFL Blitz. The game took the series back to the original style of Blitz, but removed the late hits due to input by the NFL. Late hits and some tackles were also removed in the Arcade1Up re-release of the first two games (and NFL Blitz 2000 Gold Edition), which was released in 2022.

== Gameplay ==
"It's our belief that this is like the Road Runner ... (NFL Blitz) is not what goes on when players are on the field. This is a cartoon. Still, next year, we will dial this back a little more. We're going to err on the side of conservatism."

— Gene Goldberg, then-NFL vice president of consumer products, in 2002

The Blitz titles largely follow standard American football rules as outlined by the NFL, but with key differences to encourage faster and more aggressive play. In the original games, seven players are on the field per side (as opposed to eleven). Not only were there fewer players, but positions were flexible at best. Wide receivers could be known to run the ball and sometimes pass, and defensive players were all crosses between pass rushers and defensive backs. 2002 saw an increase to eight players and NFL Blitz Pro (released in 2003) increased to the full eleven.

Unlike the NFL, pass interference is allowed, as are late hits, showboating and excessive celebrations. There are no timeouts, but the clock stops after every play. Extra point attempts are claimed to be automatic, but there are rare misses. Field goals and two-point conversions are played out as usual. Quarters have been shortened to two minutes (default setting) with a faster running timer than real time; this includes overtime, which isn't sudden death. For most releases, a first down would mean players would have to go 30 yards, instead of ten. Plays such as "Da Bomb" allowed for a quarterback to accurately throw the ball most of the length of the field at will and receivers could make impossible catches. On the other side, defensive players were able to leap up and swat (if not intercept) balls no other game could allow for or dive incredible lengths to make a stop.

From the beginning, one of the key changes in Blitz was the animations. Where other games had to keep normal tackling and stops, Blitz players were able to stop a play in a variety of unique ways. One of the most common was for a defensive player to grab his opponent and spin him around and fling him to the ground, sometimes giving them extra yards in the process. This violent and theatrical style allows the players to execute textbook professional wrestling moves such as the German suplex, elbow drop, and leg drop even after a tackle has been completed and the whistle blown. In addition, the team with the lead often receives kick-offs deeper in its own territory and are more likely to fumble or throw interceptions to help level the gameplay and encourage closer games.

The NFL, however, made Midway tame most of the more violent or insane aspects of the game as the license progressed. Subsequent releases stripped down "excessive celebrations" and late hits until the game was almost one of the sims to which it was originally opposed. However, the game still retained its over-the-top aspects including censored profanity done in a comical manner. Raiden and Shinnok, characters from the Mortal Kombat series, a series also developed by Midway, were unlockable characters in some versions.

== Development ==
The game was created by Midway Games and headed by lead artist, Sal DiVita and lead programmer, Mark Turmell.

The NFL paid little attention to the game's development until just before the launch. Upon watching a preview scrimmage by Turmell and DiVita, league representatives said they could not have the NFL associated with the game as it was then programmed. They said there was too much violence in the game and offered to refund Midway's license fee. Midway was eager to keep the NFL's endorsement of the game, so they compromised on some of the graphic violence and "late hits" in the game.

== Games ==
Beginning in 1997, Midway released a new entry in the series each year. However, after the commercial failure of the more simulation-oriented Blitz Pro, Midway did not release a Blitz in 2004 for the first time since the series began.

After losing the NFL license to Electronic Arts, Midway brought back the original Blitz style play with 2005's Blitz: The League. The celebrations and the violent aspects returned and were ramped up to levels that the NFL never allowed. In place of real NFL teams are fictional teams such as the New York Nightmare and the Minnesota Reapers. Although no current NFL players were featured, retired players Lawrence Taylor and Bill Romanowski were hired to lend their voices to and help promote the game. The game contains a significant amount of explicit content not seen in other entries of the series, such as the use of anabolic steroids and "juicing" injured players with what seems to be the equivalent of a cortisone shot. Blitz: The League also introduced an extensive story mode created with the help of one of the writers from ESPN's Playmakers. As a result of the mature themes in the title, The League is the first and only professional football franchise to ever receive the "Mature" rating from the ESRB and was banned in Australia. A sequel, Blitz: The League II was released on PlayStation 3 and Xbox 360 on October 13, 2008.

After Midway's bankruptcy filing in 2009, EA Sports, publisher of the popular NFL simulation series Madden NFL and the exclusive holder of the NFL's video game rights, acquired the rights to the NFL Blitz intellectual property, and on October 19, 2011, EA Sports announced NFL Blitz' return via a story with Electronic Gaming Monthly and the release of an announcement trailer. EA Sports intended the new NFL Blitz to be an "arcade" football experience, different from the simulation-oriented Madden series. The result was the 2012 title simply called NFL Blitz.

In 2000 Midway released a spinoff to Blitz based on the Arena Football League titled Kurt Warner's Arena Football Unleashed for the PlayStation.

=== Installments ===
Titles in the NFL Blitz series
Title	Release	Platforms
NFL Blitz	1997 (arcade), 1998 (home)	Arcade, Game Boy Color, Microsoft Windows, Nintendo 64, PlayStation
NFL Blitz '99	1998	Arcade
NFL Blitz 2000 (home port of Blitz 99)	1999	Dreamcast, Game Boy Color, Microsoft Windows, Nintendo 64, PlayStation
NFL Blitz 2000 Gold Edition	1999	Arcade
NFL Blitz 2001 (home port of Blitz 2000 Gold)	2000	Dreamcast, Game Boy Color, Nintendo 64, PlayStation
NFL Blitz Special Edition	2001	Nintendo 64
NFL Blitz 2002	2001	Game Boy Advance, GameCube, PlayStation 2, Xbox
NFL Blitz 2003	2002	Game Boy Advance, GameCube, PlayStation 2, Xbox
NFL Blitz Pro	2003	GameCube, PlayStation 2, Xbox
Blitz: The League	2005	PlayStation 2, PlayStation Portable, Xbox, Xbox 360
Blitz: The League II	2008	PlayStation 3, Xbox 360
NFL Blitz	2012	PlayStation 3, Xbox 360

=== Spinoffs ===
Title	Release	Platforms
Kurt Warner's Arena Football Unleashed	2000	PlayStation

== Reception ==
Critical reception for Blitz: The League was mostly positive. Gamerankings.com gives the PlayStation 2 release a score of 75% and the Xbox release a score of 77%. GameSpot.com gave both PS2 and Xbox versions an 8.6/10.

== See also ==
- Mutant League Football
- NHL Hitz (disambiguation)
