= Blitz: The League II =

2008 video game

- North American PlayStation 3 cover art
- Developer: Midway Games
- Publisher: Midway
- Series: NFL Blitz
- Platforms: PlayStation 3, Xbox 360
- Release: NA: October 13, 2008; EU: October 24, 2008
- Genre: Sports
- Modes: Single-player, multiplayer

Blitz: The League II is an American football video game developed and published by Midway as part of its NFL Blitz series. It is a sequel to Blitz: The League. The game was released for the PlayStation 3 and Xbox 360 on October 13, 2008. An original Xbox version was in development and rated by the German rating system USK. There are five new teams included in this installment: The Los Angeles Riot, Houston Riders, Vancouver Beavers, Milwaukee Hounds, and Atlanta 404; and four older teams have been relocated. Lawrence Taylor (L.T.) is featured in the game, reprising his role as Quentin Sands.

The game also alludes to real-life scandals involving NFL players and teams, such as Michael Vick's "Ron Mexico" controversy, the New England Patriots' "Spygate" scandal, and the Minnesota Vikings' boat scandal.

== Plot ==
Expansion teams Los Angeles Riot and the Anaheim Spartans (Note: Anaheim Spartans is the default player-created team name.) join The League's Division II & III, respectively. The LA Riot, managed by corrupt league commissioner Clive Hanson, begins their tenure by signing star linebacker Bruno Battaglia alongside several other star players. Despite being projected to be the #1 draft pick, two-way player Kid Franchise (Note: Kid Franchise is the default player name.) chooses to play for his home team, the Spartans. Franchise's decision draws the ire of Hanson and creates a rivalry between the LA Riot and Spartans.

Commissioner Hanson forces a trade that sends New York Nightmare linebacker Quentin Sands to the Spartans, tasking Sands with sabotaging the team. The Spartans play their way to the Division III championship, where they defeat the Conrad Damon-led Milwaukee Hounds. During the celebrations, Sands taints Franchise's drink with an unspecified prohibited drug. As a result, Franchise is sent to the Milltown Correctional Facility, where the warden tells Franchise that he will be released early if he can lead Milltown to a win against the rival Super Max facility. Franchise defeats Super Max, allowing him to return to the Spartans, who are preparing for their first season in Division II.

The Spartans draft a captain from a Division III team. Meanwhile, the LA Riot signs Cleveland Steamers wide receiver Justin Jonas. Battaglia informs Franchise that Quentin Sands is responsible for spiking his drink, causing a fight and feud between Franchise and Sands. The Spartans reach the Division II championship, where they defeat the Minnesota Reapers, who previously upset the LA Riot. Later, it is revealed that seven Reapers players were killed in a boat crash, causing the team to fold. In a raffle rigged by Commissioner Hanson, the LA Riot are selected for promotion alongside the Spartans.

During the offseason, Super Max captain Karl Tirpitz joins the Spartans. The LA Riot are favored to win the championship after adding Washington Redhawks captain Clayton Wescott, halfback Kelvin Diggs and defensive end Tyrell Price of the Kansas City Crossfire, and Atlanta 404 defensive end Kimo Talofa. Before a game against the New York Nightmare, Sands and Franchise end their feud and agree to work together to defeat the LA Riot and stop Commissioner Hanson. Sands falsely tells Hanson that Franchise injured his Achilles tendon, and requests a trade to the LA Riot. Hanson agrees and tells the other executives to buy stock on the LA Riot, not knowing that Sands recorded their conversation.

The Spartans beat the undefeated LA Riot in the Division I championship. In the aftermath, Hanson is arrested for insider trading, money laundering, and extortion.

== Reception ==
Reception

Aggregate score
Aggregator	Score	
Aggregator	PS3	Xbox 360
Metacritic	62/100	68/100

Review scores
Publication	Score	
Publication	PS3	Xbox 360
Game Informer	7/10	7/10
GamePro	3.5/5	N/A
GameRevolution	D+	D+
GameSpot	7.5/10	7.5/10
GameSpy	2.5/5	2.5/5
GameZone	7.1/10	7.4/10
Hardcore Gamer	N/A	3/5
IGN	5.5/10	5.5/10
Official Xbox Magazine (US)	N/A	8/10
PlayStation: The Official Magazine	3/5	N/A
411Mania	8.3/10	8.3/10

The game received "mixed or average reviews" on both platforms according to the review aggregation website Metacritic.
