= Blitz: The League =

2005 video game

- North American Xbox cover art
- Developer: Midway Games
- Publisher: Midway
- Producer: Adam Boyes
- Designer: Kraig Kujawa
- Programmer: Dave Lang
- Artist: Matthew Gilmore
- Series: NFL Blitz
- Engine: RenderWare
- Platforms: PlayStation 2, Xbox, Xbox 360, PlayStation Portable
- Release: PlayStation 2, Xbox: NA: October 17, 2005; Xbox 360: NA: November 6, 2006; EU: February 23, 2007; PlayStation Portable: NA: December 12, 2006
- Genre: Sports
- Modes: Single player, multiplayer

Blitz: The League is an American football video game developed and published by Midway as an extension of their NFL Blitz series. It was released for the PlayStation 2 and Xbox in October 2005, after the National Football League (NFL) signed an exclusive licensing deal with Electronic Arts. Lawrence Taylor, who provides voice acting for the game, served as its official spokesman.

Blitz: The League was ported to the Xbox 360 in November 2006. This version of the game was banned in Australia. A portable version, titled Blitz: Overtime, was released on the PlayStation Portable in December 2006. These versions included the voicework and likeness of former NFL linebacker Bill Romanowski. The game was originally intended to be a launch title for the Wii, but the version was delayed and eventually canceled.

A sequel, titled Blitz: The League II, was released for the PlayStation 3 and Xbox 360 in 2008.

== Gameplay ==
Since Midway no longer had an NFL license, Blitz: The League focuses on a fictional league consisting of 18 teams known simply as "The League", whose history is written as a tongue-in-cheek parallel of the NFL's, with the league consisting of three divisions, using a system of promotion and relegation. The game also brings back the hard-hitting and violent gameplay of earlier Blitz games. Former NFL linebacker Lawrence Taylor voices Quentin Sands, captain of the New York Nightmare. In the next iteration released in 2006, former NFL linebacker Bill Romanowski voices Bruno Battaglia, the captain of the Baltimore Bearcats.

Blitz: The League is very similar to previous installments in the Blitz series, as it depicts a considerably more violent version of gridiron football. Like previous games in the series, first downs are awarded at 30 yards rather than 10; there are eight men to a side (similar to arena football, not 11 as in American football); penalties and referees do not exist (although players are still prohibited from going offsides); and overly vicious tackles and blocking are the norm. On gaining yards, making tackles for a loss, scoring, or forcing turnovers, players are rewarded with an increased "Clash" meter. When the "Clash" meter is charged up, players may perform "dirty" stiff-arms, dodges, rush avoidance (for quarterbacks) or, most importantly, "dirty hits" on defense. Performing a "dirty" hit or stiff-arm causes opposing players to lose stamina (in essence, reducing their effectiveness) and occasionally become injured (an image of an x-ray would zoom into a specific bone and show it snap, show a ligament tearing, or depict a different brutal injury). After successfully performing a number of "Clash" moves (or forcing turnovers and scoring touchdowns), players can perform "Unleash" moves which are nearly unstoppable.

When an injury occurs, the player may choose to "treat" the injury normally, or "juice" the injury (inject an athlete with steroids). "Juicing" causes an injury to be ignored, but increases the risk of more severe injuries. Some other injuries, such as kneecap fracture, torn ACL, wrist fracture, and ruptured Achilles, are more serious and cannot be juiced.

=== Campaign mode ===
In the single-player campaign mode, the player is challenged to win championships in all three divisions of the fictitious American football championship known simply as "The League". The player begins by creating a new team, designing its uniforms and choosing a team name, then picks one of three defensive veterans and one of three offensive rookies as team captains.

The player must win seven of ten regular-season games in each division, followed by a division championship. The player needs to decide on a training program for each team member, which gradually increases the member's skills. Money is earned for each game based on performance, "dirty hits" performed, etc., and can also earn additional money for "gambling" on the results of a game. The money is used to purchase better equipments, upgrade training facilities, and even buy drugs (some legal, some not) that can be used to augment performance.

In "Campaign" mode, the player is also periodically shown cutscenes illustrating a variety of subplots involving the team. The game begins at the end of the previous season, when Quentin Sands of the New York Nightmare lands a devastating, career-ending hit on the player's team's star quarterback, similar to Taylor's sack of Washington Redskins quarterback Joe Theismann during the 1985 NFL season, which broke Theismann's leg and ended his career. As a result, the player's team is demoted to Division 3. As the game progresses, the player learns that the veteran captain has returned to the game as a result of financial troubles, while the rookie is portrayed as a naive yet talented individual whom Sands has targeted as the next player whose career he'll end on the field.

The story of the "Campaign" mode was partially written by former writers of Playmakers, a controversial show on the ESPN network that was canceled due to the NFL's objections to its portrayal of professional football players. Like in the series, the pro circuit chronicled in the game is simply referred to as "The League".

Also, before every game in "Campaign" mode, a cutscene showcasing the opposing team plays, wherein the coach gives information of that team's star player, while also laying out the game plan for how to play against the opponents' offense and defense in order to win, adding an element of strategy to each game.

=== Multiplayer mode ===
Blitz: The League supports online multiplayer. While Xbox Live support for games on the original Xbox ended in 2010, Blitz: The League is now playable online with Insignia, a revival server restoring online functionality to original Xbox games.

== Plot ==
An unspecified team trails the New York Nightmare in the closing seconds of a game. During the last play, the team's quarterback is sacked by Nightmare linebacker Quentin Sands, causing a career-ending injury. The loss causes the team to be relegated to The League's Division III, while the Nightmare are promoted to Division I. The team owner, Lyman Strang, unveils his new stadium plan to Mayor Sheila Andrews. Andrews refuses to support the plan, believing voters would be heavily against funding it. In response, Strang bets that if his team wins the League Championship, she must support the measure. If they don't, Strang will donate to Andrew's reelection fund. Strang orders a complete overhaul of the team, rebranding to the Albuquerque Demons. (Note: Albuquerque Demons is the default team name) In addition to bringing in a new coaching and medical staff, the team adds two new players. (Note: Dialogue refers to these two players as "The Rookie" and "The Veteran")

The Veteran is left in financial ruin following a messy divorce, poor investments, an extravagant lifestyle, and a gambling addiction. Before the season, he begs Strang for a better contract. Meanwhile, The Rookie begins flirting with Jacqui, a cheerleader who attended the same university as him, but The League's strict rules on player-cheerleader interaction prohibit them from dating. The Demons win the Division III Championship against the Arizona Outlaws, which The Veteran doesn't take seriously. However, tech company iRiver purchases the stadium's naming rights, allowing Strang to renovate it and sign linebacker and former Baltimore Bearcats captain Bruno Battaglia, despite the coach's objection.

The Veteran continues to face mounting financial pressure, finding a boot attached to his car after a game against the Minnesota Reapers. Desperate, The Veteran contacts his bookie to bet on a college game. Mayor Andrews invites The Veteran into her limousine and offers a deal to star in a commercial promoting the city before beginning a sexual relationship with him. The addition of Battaglia causes tension in the locker room, particularly with The Rookie after he sees Battaglia flirting with Jacqui. The Demons capture the Division II Championship after defeating the Minnesota Reapers. iRiver continues funding stadium renovations, and citizens increasingly support the team.

While celebrating their win in a nightclub, Mayor Andrews sees The Veteran flirting with another woman. The team encounters the New York Nightmare, who are in town to film a beer commercial. Sands taunts The Rookie using Jacqui, sparking a brawl between the teams. The Demons are arrested, but Strang convinces Andrews to bail them out, but refuses to release The Veteran. The Demons suffer a disastrous defeat against the Nightmare, where Sands lays a dirty hit on The Rookie, tearing his MCL and ending his season. The Veteran is released from prison, quickly accruing debt again, leading to his life being threatened by his bookie.

The Demons make the Division I Championship game against the Nightmare. The night before the game, The Veteran sells the Demons' playbook to Sands, desperate to repay his debts. Afterward, he informs his bookie that he has the money, but instead uses it to place a bet on the game. During the game, Sands is surprised that none of the team's plays appear in the book, revealing that The Veteran tricked him. With this deception, the Demons defeat the Reapers and become the champions.

In the aftermath, The Veteran plays several more years in The League, The Rookie reconciles with Jackie, who leaves her job to date him, and the stadium measure passes.

== Release ==
On July 20, 2005, Midway announced Lawrence Taylor will become the official cover athlete for the video game, who would also act as the voice and personality of the game's main character/athlete, Quentin Sands.

The Xbox 360 version, which had been planned for release in Australia on February 23, 2007 (the day before its European release date), was refused classification by the country's Office of Film and Literature Classification, effectively banning the game there. The reason for the ban was that the use of drugs was related to incentives and rewards. Blitz: The League became the first professional American football game in history to receive the "Mature" rating from the ESRB.

== Reception ==
Reception

Aggregate score
Aggregator	Score			
Aggregator	PS2	PSP	Xbox	Xbox 360
Metacritic	76/100	61/100	78/100	69/100

Review scores
Publication	Score			
Publication	PS2	PSP	Xbox	Xbox 360
Computer Games Magazine	3.5/5	N/A	3.5/5	N/A
Electronic Gaming Monthly	8.33/10	N/A	8.33/10	N/A
Eurogamer	N/A	N/A	N/A	7/10
Game Informer	7.75/10	N/A	7.75/10	N/A
GamePro	4/5	N/A	N/A	3.5/5
GameSpot	8.6/10	6.1/10	8.6/10	7.4/10
GameSpy	4/5	N/A	4/5	N/A
GameTrailers	7.6/10	N/A	7.6/10	N/A
IGN	7.2/10	6.2/10	7.2/10	6.5/10
Official U.S. PlayStation Magazine	4/5	N/A	N/A	N/A
Official Xbox Magazine (US)	N/A	N/A	7.4/10	7/10
PlayStation: The Official Magazine	6/10	6/10	N/A	N/A
Detroit Free Press	3/4	N/A	N/A	N/A
The New York Times	(average)	N/A	(average)	N/A

The PlayStation 2 and Xbox versions received "generally favorable reviews", while the Xbox 360 version and Blitz: Overtime received "mixed or average reviews", according to the review aggregation website Metacritic.

The most common critical complaints with Blitz revolved around allegations of "rubberband AI"; that is, in single-player mode, the computer opponent becomes nearly unbeatable late in games with the human player leading. But many critics also pointed out that rubberband AI is also an undocumented feature of more "legitimate" football titles such as the Madden NFL series. The PlayStation 2 and PlayStation Portable releases were also criticized for their very long delays and load times.

Detroit Free Press gave the PS2 version three stars out of four: "Solid graphics, online play and original in-your-face features make Blitz: The League a great alternative to the other football games on the market". Maxim gave the PS2 and Xbox version four stars out of five: "[Do you] Crave a purer form of pigskin, where painkillers and cheap shots aren’t just overlooked but encouraged? Then give this ballsy baller a try". However, Charles Herold of The New York Times gave the same console versions an average review: "While it is frustratingly easy to throw an incomplete pass and slow-mo didn't always respond when I tried to trigger it, when it worked right I would leap up from my couch and start screaming in excitement as my quarterback nimbly tossed the ball down the field to a receiver who spun away from one opponent, crashed through another and raced down an open field".

The game sold 350,000 units by December 2005.

== See also ==
- Blitz: The League II
- All-Pro Football 2K8
- Madden NFL 06
