= NFL Blitz (1997 video game) =

1997 video game

- North American Nintendo 64 box art
- Developers: Midway; Midway Studios San Diego (PlayStation); Digital Eclipse (GBC)
- Publisher: Midway
- Series: NFL Blitz
- Platforms: Arcade, Nintendo 64, PlayStation, Microsoft Windows, Game Boy Color
- Release: Arcade: NA: November 1997; Nintendo 64, PlayStation: NA: September 12, 1998; Windows: NA: October 1998; Game Boy Color: NA: December 1998; EU: 1998
- Genre: Sports (American football)
- Modes: Single-player, multiplayer
- Arcade system: Midway Seattle Hardware

NFL Blitz is an American football video game developed and published by Midway for the arcade in 1997, the first game in the NFL Blitz series. The development team was headed by Mark Turmell and Sal Divita, who were known for being behind NBA Jam, and NFL Blitz was a deliberate attempt to translate the exaggerated arcade-style approach of NBA Jam to the football realm. The game was ported to the PlayStation, Nintendo 64, Windows, and Game Boy Color in 1998. The cover athlete for the game was then Pittsburgh Steelers quarterback Kordell Stewart.

== Gameplay ==
NFL Blitz uses seven-on-seven-man American football teams. It also diverges from traditional rules of American football in that there are no penalties, no substitutions, and players can perform illegal attacks on each other such as dropkicks.

The game features a full NFL license, with players and teams from the 1997 season.

== Development ==
The game was in development for two years. The game was developed by a team led by Mark Turmell and Sal Divita, who wanted to "do for the NFL franchise what we did for the NBA franchise [with NBA Jam]" in Turmell's words. In particular, they wanted to create a football game which allows the players to get to the action more quickly than other football games, which they found tended to bog the player down in the play-select screen and other setup menus. Details of the game were first publicly reported on in an August 1997 issue of Game Informer.

When the game was shown to NFL executives for the first time at Midway's Chicago offices a week before its official launch in arcades, those in attendance reacted negatively due to the excessive violence of the gameplay. The NFL went as far as to offer back the licensing fee Midway paid to the league, due to not wanting any association with the product. The game was eventually approved by the league for release after several compromises were made regarding the game's violence, including removing blood splatter and lessening the window of time after plays to dogpile and tackle opponents.

The arcade board is called the Seattle System, which is based on a 3Dfx chipset.

According to Divita, the team decided to make the game support just two players instead of four "because in a football game, there just isn't enough gameplay between the quarterback and the receiver to make it fun. It's not like NBA Jam, where teamwork can really be a factor."

The game had a marketing budget of $8 million.

== Reception ==
Reception

Aggregate score
Aggregator	Score				
Aggregator	Arcade	GBC	N64	PC	PS
GameRankings	N/A	N/A	90%	86%	90%

Review scores
Publication	Score				
Publication	Arcade	GBC	N64	PC	PS
CNET Gamecenter	N/A	N/A	9/10	N/A	9/10
Computer Gaming World	N/A	N/A	N/A	3.5/5	N/A
Electronic Gaming Monthly	N/A	N/A	9.125/10 (Note: In Electronic Gaming Monthly's review of the Nintendo 64 version, three critics gave it each a score of 9/10, and the other one gave it 9.5/10.)	N/A	8.675/10 (Note: In Electronic Gaming Monthly's review of the PlayStation version, three critics gave it each a score of 8.5/10, and one gave it 9/10.)
Game Informer	N/A	6/10	9/10	8/10	8/10
GameFan	N/A	N/A	92%	N/A	N/A
GamePro	N/A	N/A	5/5 (Note: GamePro gave the Nintendo 64 version two 5/5 scores for graphics and fun factor, and two 4.5/5 scores for sound and control.)	3.5/5 (Note: GamePro gave the PC version 4.5/5 for graphics, 5/5 for sound, and 3.5/5 for control and fun factor.)	4/5 (Note: GamePro gave the PlayStation version two 5/5 scores for graphics and sound, 3.5/5 for control, and 4/5 for fun factor.)
GameRevolution	N/A	N/A	B	N/A	B
GameSpot	N/A	N/A	9.1/10	9/10	8.8/10
IGN	N/A	N/A	9.1/10	8.5/10	9.4/10
N64 Magazine	N/A	N/A	87%	N/A	N/A
Next Generation	4/5	N/A	N/A	N/A	4/5
Nintendo Power	N/A	4.9/10	8.2/10	N/A	N/A
Official U.S. PlayStation Magazine	N/A	N/A	N/A	N/A	5/5
PC Accelerator	N/A	N/A	N/A	8/10	N/A
PC Gamer (US)	N/A	N/A	N/A	89%	N/A

The Nintendo 64 and PlayStation versions received universal acclaim, while the PC version received favorable reviews, according to the review aggregation website GameRankings. Next Generation said in its June 1998 issue that the arcade version "provides an unrealistic but adrenaline-packed experience." The same magazine later said of the PlayStation version in its November 1998 issue, "The only real knock we have on Blitz is that, like the arcade version, the lack of play variety can get stale after a while, especially in single-player mode. Despite that one problem, Blitz offers the most intense game of football you're likely to find at home and makes a worthy purchase." GameFan gave the N64 version a positive review. Computer Games Strategy Plus gave the PC version four stars out of five and said, "After yet another late hit, you're sure to nod in approval when the announcer says, 'That was totally uncalled for, but awfully fun to watch.'" N64 Magazine gave the N64 version 87%. Kevin Cheung of Hyper gave the same console version 83% and stated, "The bottom line is that Blitz is the most offensively oriented football game around, with enough punishment that guarantees pleasure for the masses. Even though it has nowhere near the depth, control, or strategy of Madden or QB Club, it is the most satisfying quick-thrill game I can imagine."

Brad Cook of AllGame gave the arcade version four-and-a-half stars out of five, saying that "it's not football played according to real rules, but it's still a blast. It's more like those pick-up games you played with kids in your neighborhood way back when, when every play was a pass and you needed two completions for a first down. The only difference is that punting is an option in this game, and if you had treated your opponents as a kid the way you can treat them in this game, then you're probably reading this from prison right now." Likewise, Christopher Michael Baker gave the PlayStation version four-and-a-half stars, saying that the game "should satisfy just about anyone looking for a different type of football game. If you're getting tired of the yearly rehashes that most other football games are these days, then give it a try. Besides, who need realism when you can just have lots of fun?" Scott Alan Marriott gave the Nintendo 64 version four stars out of five, calling it "hands-down the system's best playing arcade game for 1998." Gil Alexander Shif gave the PC version three-and-a-half stars out of five, calling it "a simplistic, unrealistic football game that's good at what it does. I detected little or no buggy code and my dissatisfaction from the lack of options was generally offset by the 'turbo' button on my game pad which I pressed and pressed with reckless abandon."

The game was named "Arcade Game of the Year" at Electronic Gaming Monthly's 1997 Editors' Choice Awards. In their first month of release, the Nintendo 64 and PlayStation versions were respectively the eighth and tenth best-selling home console games in the United States. The PC version won the award for "Best Sports Game of the Year" at IGN's Best of 1998 Awards, and was nominated for the "Sports Game of the Year" award at GameSpot's Best & Worst of 1998 Awards, which ultimately went to FIFA 99. The Nintendo 64 version was a nominee for the AIAS' "Console Sports Game of the Year" award, which was ultimately given to 1080° Snowboarding; it was also nominated for Best Nintendo 64 Game at the 1998 CNET Gamecenter Awards, which ultimately went to The Legend of Zelda: Ocarina of Time. The PlayStation version won the award for "Most Unrealistic Sports Game" at the 1998 OPM Editors' Awards, and was nominated for the "Best Sports Game", "Best Arcade Conversion", and "Best Multiplayer Game" awards, all of which went to Hot Shots Golf, Tekken 3, and Devil Dice, respectively.
