= International Superstar Soccer 98 =

1998 video game

- North American cover art featuring Carlos Valderrama
- Developer: Konami Computer Entertainment Osaka
- Publisher: Konami
- Director: Yasuo Okuda
- Producer: Katsuya Nagae
- Series: International Superstar Soccer; FIFA World Cup
- Platform: Nintendo 64
- Release: JP: June 4, 1998; NA: August 21, 1998; EU: September 1, 1998
- Genre: Sports
- Modes: Single-player, multiplayer

International Superstar Soccer 98 (officially abbreviated as ISS 98 and known as Jikkyō World Soccer: World Cup France '98 (実況ワールドサッカー 〜WORLD CUP FRANCE'98(ワールドカップ フランス'98)〜, Jikkyō Wārudo Sakkā 〜Wārudo Kappu Furansu '98〜) in Japan) is a soccer video game developed by Konami Computer Entertainment Osaka which was released exclusively for the Nintendo 64. It was released at the same time as International Superstar Soccer Pro 98, developed by Konami Computer Entertainment Tokyo (KCET) for the PlayStation.

Although it lacked a FIFPro licence, it featured Italian striker Fabrizio Ravanelli along with German goalkeeper Andreas Koepke (on German release) and Paul Ince (on British release) on the cover. The cover of the North American version featured Colombian player Carlos Valderrama, and the game featured licence from Reebok to use their logos in adboards and the Chile national football team kits.

== Content ==
Due to the date of release, the game focuses on 1998 FIFA World Cup and includes each qualified team plus more. Every team which participated in tournament has home, away and goalkeeper World Cup official kits featuring manufacturer logos and national emblems (with the exception of the United States, whose main uniform is the red-and-white striped kit from the 1994 tournament) and the rest has those used in qualifications. In the European version, the squads are in accordance with official 1998 FIFA World Cup squads as well. Teams that did not qualify have line-ups from the qualifiers (in the North American version, all teams have lineups from the qualifiers). However the players' names are misspelled due to the lack of a FIFPro license, though they have their actual numbers, appearance, age, height, weight and abilities. In the European version, the game has more sponsors other than Reebok, such as Apple and Continental AG, which appear in adboards.

The Japanese version was an officially licensed World Cup product, featuring its official sponsors and mascot Footix, and also included unlicensed player names, save for the Japanese squad, due to it also being licensed by the Japanese Football Association.

== Game modes ==
International Superstar Soccer 98 featured 6 different game modes:

- Open Game: a friendly match against the computer or another player with choices of stadium, weather and time of day, as well as match handicaps (player condition, goalkeeper strength and number of players on the field, from 7 to 11). It was also possible to spectate CPU vs. CPU matches.
- International Cup: This mode is where the player selects a team from one region and attempts to get them to the International Cup 98, starting from the respective region's qualifiers.
- World League: 48 international teams participate in a round-robin tournament with home and away matches.
- Scenario: 16 situations wherein the player is placed in a match in progress. Depending on the difficulty, the player must either administer a victory (in easier matches), or win a match by breaking a tie or turning the result around (in higher difficulties).
- Penalty Kick Mode: Two teams take a series of five penalty kicks to select the winner. In case of a draw, they undergo successive sudden death rounds.
- Training: Practice of shooting free kicks, corner kicks and defensive play with a selected team. The player may also practice freely on the entire field without an opposite team.

== Reception ==
Reception

Aggregate score
Aggregator	Score
Metacritic	91/100

Review scores
Publication	Score
AllGame	4.5/5
Consoles +	94%
Edge	9/10
Electronic Gaming Monthly	9/10 (Note: Two critics of Electronic Gaming Monthly gave the game each a score of 9.5/10, one gave it 8.5/10, and the other gave it 9/10.)
Famitsu	33/40
Game Informer	9/10
GameFan	94% (Note: In GameFan's viewpoint of the game, one critic gave it 93, and the other 95.)
Hyper	87%
IGN	9.1/10
N64 Magazine	(PAL) 92% (JP) 91%
Next Generation	4/5
Nintendo Power	8.5/10

The game received "universal acclaim" according to the review aggregation website Metacritic. Cubed3 praised the game's "ridiculously addictive" gameplay, create-a-player, six various modes (which have an option of 64 teams, nine stadiums, four weather conditions and a choice of night or day) and the ability to play multiplayer with up to three players. GamePro, however, said, "Soccer fans will find little reason to kick off with ISS '98." (Note: GamePro gave the game all 3.5/5 scores for graphics, sound, control, and fun factor.) In Japan, Famitsu gave it a score of 33 out of 40.

Next Generation said in its August 1998 issue, "After a few hours of play, you'll forgive the apparent lack of improvement and realize that subtlety is everything in the most popular sport on Earth. The only thing that could really improve this series would be the inclusion of real players' names and correct uniforms. Until that happens, Superstar Soccer is just a shade short of perfect." Six issues later, the magazine ranked it at #50 in its list of the Fifty Best Games of All Time, saying that the game "simply represents one of the finest examples of the genre. Although soccer in the U.S. enjoys nowhere near the popularity of other sports, the quality of this simulation should ensure its place on every serious gamer's shelf."
