= FIFA 99 =

1998 association football video game

- North American PlayStation cover art featuring Arsenal's Dennis Bergkamp
- Developer: EA Canada
- Publisher: EA Sports
- Series: FIFA
- Engine: Virtual Stadium
- Platforms: Nintendo 64, PlayStation, Microsoft Windows
- Release: Windows, PlayStation: EU: 20 November 1998 (PS); NA: 24 November 1998; EU: 4 December 1998 (PC); Nintendo 64: NA: December 1998; EU: 8 December 1998
- Genre: Sports
- Modes: Single player, multiplayer, multiplayer online

FIFA 99 is a football simulation video game developed by EA Canada and published by Electronic Arts under the EA Sports label. It is the sixth game in the FIFA series and was released in 1998 for Microsoft Windows, PlayStation and Nintendo 64, being the last FIFA game to be released in the latter console.

== Gameplay ==
While the indoor mode was no longer featured, the gameplay's fluidity and responsiveness was increased. The increasing number of websites dedicated to the game and a larger number of leagues (the Malaysian League was removed, and on its stead came two new leagues: the Belgian First Division and the Portuguese Primeira Liga; this came to be a problem when the owners of the rights to the Primeira Liga tried to pull the game from the shelves locally). Graphically, it is a major improvement over FIFA '98, with the inclusion of basic facial animations and different players' heights as well as certain other cosmetic features such as improved kits and emblems, although they are unlicensed. Gamers may also create their own custom cups and leagues and select the teams they wish to participate.

FIFA 99 also features an elite league called the "European Dream League" in which 20 top teams from across Europe battle it out in a league format. It was also the first game to feature a block containing teams which did not pertain to any of the main leagues (back then, it was known as "Rest of Europe" since all teams were European, the vast majority of them featured either in the 1998–99 season of the Cup Winners' Cup, UEFA Cup or Champions League).

== Reception ==
Reception

Aggregate score
Aggregator	Score		
Aggregator	N64	PC	PS
GameRankings	83%	89%	88%

Review scores
Publication	Score		
Publication	N64	PC	PS
CNET Gamecenter	N/A	9/10	7/10
Computer Gaming World	N/A	4.5/5	N/A
Electronic Gaming Monthly	8.5/10, 9.5/10, 8.5/10, 9/10	N/A	8.625/10 (Note: Four critics of Electronic Gaming Monthly gave the PlayStation version each a score of 9.5/10, 7.5/10, 9/10, and 8.5/10.)
Famitsu	N/A	N/A	29/40
Game Informer	8.25/10	N/A	7/10
GamePro	4.5/5 (Note: GamePro gave the Nintendo 64 version 4.5/5 each for graphics, sound, control, and overall fun factor.)	N/A	5/5 (Note: GamePro gave the PlayStation version three 5/5 scores for graphics, control, and overall fun factor, and 4.5/5 for sound.)
GameRevolution	N/A	A	A−
GameSpot	8.2/10	9.2/10	8.4/10
IGN	9/10	8.7/10	9/10
N64 Magazine	83%	N/A	N/A
Nintendo Power	8.6/10	N/A	N/A
Official U.S. PlayStation Magazine	N/A	N/A	4.5/5
PC Accelerator	N/A	9/10	N/A
PC Gamer (UK)	N/A	90%	N/A
The Cincinnati Enquirer	N/A	4/4	N/A

The game received favorable reviews on all platforms according to the review aggregation website GameRankings. Computer Games Strategy Plus gave the PC version four-and-a-half stars out of five, calling it "one of the best sports games you can buy." In Japan, where the PlayStation version was ported and published by Electronic Arts Square under the name FIFA 99: Europa League Soccer (FIFA99 ヨーロッパリーグ・サッカー, FIFA 99 Yōroppa Rīgu Sakkā) on 26 August 1999, Famitsu gave it a score of 29 out of 40.

The game was a bestseller in the UK, replacing Tomb Raider III. In February 1999, the PlayStation version received a "Platinum" sales award from the Verband der Unterhaltungssoftware Deutschland (VUD), indicating sales of at least 200,000 units across Germany, Austria and Switzerland. The PC version took "Gold", for 100,000 sales, at the same time. At the 1999 Milia festival in Cannes, it took home a "Gold" prize for revenues above €50 million in the European Union during 1998. The PC version won the "Best Sports" award in PC PowerPlay's Game of the Year 1999 Awards. It also won the award for "PC Sports Game of the Year" at AIAS' 2nd Annual Interactive Achievement Awards, the Best Sports Game award at the 1998 CNET Gamecenter Awards, the "Best Sports" award (along with FIFA: Road to World Cup 98 and World Cup 98, collectively) at Computer Gaming World's 1999 Premier Awards, and the "Sports Game of the Year" award at GameSpot's Best & Worst of 1998 Awards, and was nominated for the "Best Sports Game of the Year" award at IGN's Best of 1998 Awards, which ultimately went to NFL Blitz.
