= Midway Games =

American video game company

Midway Games Inc.
- Final logo used from 1998 to 2010
- Formerly: Midway Manufacturing (1958–1982, 1988–1996); Bally Midway (1982–1988)
- Type: Public
- Traded as: Nasdaq: MWY
- Industry: Video games; Consumer electronics
- Founded: November 1, 1958; 68 years ago
- Founders: Henry Ross; Marcine Wolverton
- Defunct: June 9, 2010; 16 years ago
- Fate: Chapter 11 bankruptcy; majority of assets sold to Warner Bros. Interactive Entertainment
- Successor: Warner Bros. Games
- Headquarters: Chicago, Illinois, U.S.
- Key people: Matt Booty (President and CEO)
- Products: Spy Hunter; Rampage; Mortal Kombat; NBA Jam; Cruis'n; NFL Blitz
- Revenue: ▲US$219.6 million (FY 2008)
- Net income: ▼ -US$191.0 million (FY 2008)
- Owner: Bally Manufacturing (1969–1988); WMS Industries, Inc. (1988–1998)
- Number of employees: 540 (February 2009)

Midway Games Inc. (formerly Midway Manufacturing and Bally Midway, and commonly known simply as Midway) was an American video game company that existed from 1958 to 2010. Midway's franchises included Mortal Kombat, Rampage, Spy Hunter, NBA Jam, Cruis'n and NFL Blitz. Midway also acquired the rights to video games that were originally developed by WMS Industries and Atari Games, such as Defender, Joust, Robotron: 2084, Gauntlet and the Rush series.

The company was founded as Midway Manufacturing in 1958, as an amusement game manufacturer. The company was then purchased by Bally Manufacturing in 1969. In 1973, Midway moved into the interactive entertainment industry, developing and publishing arcade video games. The company scored its first mainstream hit with the American distribution of Taito's Space Invaders in 1978, which it followed up by licensing Namco games such as Galaxian (1979), Pac-Man (1980), and Galaga (1981). Bally then consolidated its pinball division with Midway in 1982, which was renamed Bally Midway. In 1988, Bally Manufacturing sold its amusement games operations to WMS Industries, the former Williams Electronics, which used the plain Midway name for video games while using the Bally and Williams names for pinball.

In 1994, WMS purchased Tradewest to bring publishing of home video game market in-house, with the latter becoming Midway Home Entertainment in 1996, the same year that Midway made its initial public offering of stock. In 1998, WMS spun off its remaining shares of Midway. Midway was ranked the fourth largest-selling video game publisher in 2000; however, it experienced large annual net losses and engaged in a series of stock and debt offerings and other financings and borrowings. Midway exited the arcade industry in 2001. Sumner Redstone, head of Viacom and CBS Corporation, increased his stake in Midway from about 15% in 1998 to about 87% by the end of 2007. In December 2008, Redstone sold all his stock and $70 million of Midway debt to private investor Mark Thomas for $100,000.

In February 2009, Midway Games filed for Chapter 11 bankruptcy. Warner Bros. Interactive Entertainment acquired most of the company's assets, and Midway settled with Mark Thomas to relinquish his Midway stock and debt. The U.S. District Court in Chicago dismissed a lawsuit alleging that former officers of Midway misled shareholders while selling their own stock. In 2010, the bankruptcy court dismissed claims against Redstone concerning his sale of the company to Thomas and approved Midway's plan of liquidation. Midway terminated the public registration of its securities on June 9, 2010.

== History ==
=== Arcade games ===
Midway Mfg. Co. began in 1958 as an independent manufacturer of amusement equipment founded by Henry Ross and Marcine Wolverton. It was purchased by Bally in 1969. Bally, at that time, was a leader in the manufacture of slot machines. After some years making mechanical arcade games such as puck bowling and simulated western shoot-out, Midway became an early American maker of arcade video games. Throughout the 1970s, Midway had a close alliance with Japanese video game publisher Taito, with both companies regularly licensing their games to each other for distribution in their respective country.

Meanwhile, Midway's breakthrough success came in 1978, with the licensing and distribution of Taito's seminal arcade game Space Invaders in America. This was followed by Midway's licensing and distributing the American version of Namco's Pac-Man in 1980, and its sequel, Ms. Pac-Man, in 1982. Also in 1982, Midway became Bally Midway Mfg. Co. after Bally merged its pinball division with Midway. Three games released that year, including Satan's Hollow, were the first to feature the Bally/Midway brand. From the late 1970s through the late 1980s, Midway was the leading producer of arcade video games in the United States. In 1983, Bally Midway acquired arcade manufacturing assets of Sega Electronics from Gulf and Western Industries, and through the purchase also gained distribution rights to arcade games developed by Sega Enterprises, Ltd. in the United States for two years which included titles such as Astron Belt, Flicky, Future Spy, and Up 'N Down.

Bally Midway was purchased in 1988 by the arcade and pinball game company Williams Electronics Games through its holding company WMS Industries, Inc. and its name was changed back to Midway Manufacturing. Midway moved its headquarters from Franklin Park, Illinois, to Williams's then-headquarters in Chicago, and WMS reincorporated Midway as a Delaware corporation. Although WMS retained many R&D employees from the original Midway, only two game designers were retained: Rampage designers Brian Colin and Jeff Nauman. WMS obtained the right from Bally to use the "Bally" brand for its pinball games since Bally had completely left the arcade/pinball industry to concentrate on casinos and slot machines.

Under WMS ownership, Midway initially continued to produce arcade games under the Bally/Midway label, while producing pinball machines under the "Bally" brand. In 1990, under the direction of WMS, the parent company signed a deal with Acclaim Entertainment where Acclaim gained the home console rights to arcade titles from Williams and Midway, with a right of first refusal clause in any of its arcade games. In 1991, however, Midway absorbed Williams' video game division and stopped using the "Bally/Midway" label for its arcade games. In 1992, the company's The Addams Family machine became the best selling pinball game of all time. In 1996, WMS purchased Time Warner Interactive, which included Atari Games, originally a part of Atari, Inc. Also in 1996, Midway changed its original corporate name, Midway Manufacturing, to Midway Games Inc., due to its entrance in the home console market. This was facilitated by WMS transferring its former home console division, Williams Entertainment, Inc., to Midway. The division had previously been known as Tradewest, which WMS had acquired along with its subsidiary Leland Corporation in 1994. The original arcade division of the company became Midway Amusement Games and the newly created home division was named Midway Home Entertainment.

=== Spin-off and home video game focus ===
In 1996, WMS made a public offering of Midway stock. At the same time, WMS transferred its video game copyrights and trademarks to Midway while Midway transferred its pinball assets to WMS. In 1998, WMS spun off its remaining 86.8% interest in Midway to the WMS shareholders, making Midway an independent entity for the first time in almost 30 years. Midway kept Atari Games as a wholly owned subsidiary as part of this spin-off. Midway retained or shared some of the WMS executive staff and used some common facilities with WMS for a few more years. Over several years, Midway gradually terminated all material agreements and executive overlap with WMS and had a declining number of common members of its board of directors, until it shared only one with its former parent company.

On December 22, 1999, Midway changed the name of its Atari Games subsidiary to Midway Games West, Inc. to avoid confusion with Atari Interactive. In 2000, its home entertainment division acquired the remaining of Psygnosis' PlayStation lineup. On June 22, 2001, Midway announced that it was closing its arcade division due to a decline in the arcade market. Midway shut down Midway Games West in February 2003, but it remained as an entity. After losing money each year since 2000, Midway's losses accelerated in 2003, as it lost $115 million on sales of about $93 million. Despite these losses, the company was able to finance its business with stock and debt offerings and various credit arrangements. In 2003, Sumner Redstone, a significant minority shareholder since the company's spinoff, began to increase his stake in the company and soon owned 80% of the stock.

In 2004, in an effort to expand its market share, Midway began a purchasing spree of independent video game development studios to strengthen its product development teams In April 2004, Midway acquired Surreal Software of Seattle, Washington. In October 2004, it acquired Inevitable Entertainment of Austin, Texas (which became Midway Austin). In December 2004, it acquired Paradox Development of Moorpark, California. On August 4, 2005, Midway acquired privately held Australian developer Ratbag Games. The studio was renamed Midway Studios—Australia. Four months later, on December 13, Midway announced to its employees there that it was shutting the studio down, leaving its employees based at that studio without a job. Two days later, on December 15, the studio was closed and its Adelaide premises emptied. During 2004 and 2005, Midway lost $20 million on sales of $162 million, and $112 million on sales of $150 million, respectively. Redstone voted his shares to elect his daughter Shari Redstone to Midway's board of directors and later as the chair of the board.

On February 15, 2005, Midway signed an agreement with Cartoon Network to publish games, based on properties, namely that of Cartoon Network and Adult Swim, and had option to expand their own properties.

Midway was ranked as the No. 4 video game publisher by sales in 2000. It was ranked as the No. 19 video game publisher in 2005 and had fallen to No. 20 in 2006, according to the magazine Game Developer.

=== Late 2000s and bankruptcy filing ===
In 2006 and 2007, Midway lost a further $77 million on sales of $166 million and $100 million on sales of $157 million, respectively. It continued to finance its business with debt offerings and other credit arrangements. As of 2007, Midway Games was engaged in a legal battle with Mindshadow Entertainment for the Psi-Ops video game rights. Mindshadow alleged that Midway copied Psi-Ops's story from a screenplay written and owned by their client. On December 2, 2008, Judge Florence-Marie Cooper of the United States District Court for the Central District of California issued a ruling granting summary judgment on all counts in Midway's favor. Judge Cooper found no evidence of copyright infringement.

On March 6, 2007, Midway reported that it had entered into a new $90 m credit agreement with National Amusements, a company controlled by Sumner Redstone. Midway's CEO, David Zucker, stated that the introduction of Unreal Tournament 3, and the company's growing success in mass-market games, were setting it up for a "significant 2008". On March 21, 2008, Zucker resigned as CEO. He was the third executive to resign from the company in three months. Succeeding Zucker as CEO was former Senior Vice President Matt Booty. During the summer of 2008, in an effort to trim costs, Midway closed its Los Angeles and Austin studios. These closures left Midway with four studios, in Chicago, Seattle, San Diego and Newcastle, England. During this time, Midway just released TNA Impact! and Blitz: The League II around September/October 2008, under the Midway Studios Los Angeles office (before its closure) and the San Diego branch (Midway Studios San Diego/Midway Home Entertainment). In November 2008, Midway reported that its cash and other resources "may not be adequate to fund... working capital requirements" and that it "would need to initiate cost cutting measures or seek additional liquidity sources". On November 20, 2008, Midway retained Lazard to assist it "in the evaluation of strategic and financial alternatives". The next day, Midway received a NYSE delisting notice, after its stock's price fell below one dollar. Midway's last title, Mortal Kombat vs. DC Universe, released around this time, in November 2008.

On December 2, 2008, Sumner Redstone sold his 87 percent stake in Midway Games to Mark Thomas, a private investor, through his company MT Acquisition Holdings LLC. Thomas's company paid approximately $100,000, or $0.0012 per share. Thomas also received $70 million of Midway's debt that was owed to Redstone. National Amusements took a significant loss on the sale, although the loss allowed it to benefit from tax losses. In December 2008, Midway disclosed that it might default on $240 million of debt after the sale of stock to Thomas triggered clauses in two bond issues totalling $150 million of debt that allowed the bondholders to demand full repayment.

In 2008, Midway lost $191 million on sales of $220 million, and Redstone's sale of his shares to Thomas eliminated Midway's ability to take advantage of accumulated net operating losses and other tax assets potentially worth more than $700 million. On February 12, 2009, Midway and its U.S. subsidiaries filed for bankruptcy protection under Chapter 11 of the U.S. Bankruptcy Code. The company began to operate as a Debtor in possession. A company spokesperson said, "We felt this was a logical next step for our organization, considering the change in control triggered the acceleration of the repayment options ... we're looking to reorganize and to come out on the other side stronger."

=== 2009 sales of assets ===
Midway announced on May 21, 2009, that it had received a takeover bid from Warner Bros. Interactive Entertainment (now Warner Bros. Games), valued at more than $33 million, to acquire most of the company's assets, including Midway's Chicago and Seattle studios and rights to the Mortal Kombat and Wheelman series. The offer did not include the San Diego and Newcastle studios or the TNA video game series. Midway had previously worked with Warner Bros. on several games including Mortal Kombat vs. DC Universe. Midway announced on May 28, 2009, that it would "accept binding offers up to June 24, 2009, to acquire some or all of the Company's assets." An auction was to be held on June 29, followed by a court hearing to approve the sale to the winning bidder or bidders. However, no other bids were placed for Midway's assets, and so the auction was canceled. On July 1, 2009, the bankruptcy court approved the sale of most of the company's assets to Warner Bros. subject to the intellectual property claims of a third party, Threshold Entertainment, which produced two Mortal Kombat films and some other Mortal Kombat entertainment properties.

On July 8, 2009, Midway disclosed that it intended to close the San Diego studio by September. However, on August 19, 2009, THQ purchased the San Diego studio for $740,000 and extinguished Midway obligations to it. On July 10, 2009, pursuant to the terms of the Settlement Agreement that was approved by the bankruptcy court, Midway agreed to pay to affiliates of its majority owner, Mark Thomas, approximately $4.7 million in full satisfaction of all Midway debt to Thomas and his affiliates, and Thomas and his affiliates granted to Midway's Creditors' Committee an irrevocable proxy to vote his controlled shares of common stock in Midway and forever relinquished the right to vote or dispose of the shares. The settlement reduced Thomas's claims by 93 percent, and Midway continued to operate as a Debtor in Possession. Also on July 10, 2009, the sale of assets to Warner Bros. was completed. The total gross purchase price for the sale was approximately $49 million, including receivables, and Warner Bros. assumed liabilities. The sale also triggered payments under Midway's Key Employee Incentive Plan of approximately $2.4 million to company executives. The Midway Chicago studio, responsible for the Mortal Kombat series and other games, became part of Warner Bros. and was later rebranded NetherRealm Studios.

On July 14, 2009, Midway announced that it had closed the Newcastle studio and terminated 75 employees. On August 19, 2009, Midway sold its French and German subsidiaries to holding companies called Spiess Media Holding UG and F+F Publishing GmbH, respectively. Spiess also purchased Midway's London publishing subsidiary on the same day. The European sales resulted in cash proceeds of $1.7 million and the elimination of related intercompany claims. In September 2009, Midway shut down its Chicago headquarters and terminated all but a few of its remaining employees. Many of the former Midway employees at the Chicago studio acquired by Warner Bros. were retained by Warner Bros. On October 2, 2009, Midway and two of its subsidiaries, Midway Home Entertainment and Midway Studios Los-Angeles, sold intellectual property assets, including Midway's TNA video game licenses, to SouthPeak Games for $100,000 and the assumption of related liabilities; Midway was no longer selling games and had been disposed of all fixed assets at that time.

=== Lawsuits and liquidation ===
In October 2009, the U.S. District Court in Chicago dismissed a lawsuit against former officers of Midway alleging that they had misled shareholders while selling their own stock. The judge ruled that Midway's shareholders had not shown that the executives "said or did anything more than publicly adopt a hopeful posture that its strategic plans would pay off". On January 29, 2010, the bankruptcy court dismissed claims brought by Midway creditors for fraud and breach of duty against Sumner Redstone, Shari Redstone and Midway's other directors, concerning his 2008 loans to the company and his subsequent sale of his 87% stake in the company to Mark Thomas, which increased Midway's net debt and wiped out the company's net operating losses and other tax assets. Judge Kevin Gross wrote that his decision was "not an endorsement of any of the defendants' actions. ... The defendants oversaw the ruin of a once highly successful company, only to hide behind the protective skirt of Delaware law, which the court is bound to apply." The court permitted other creditor claims to continue.

In February 2010, Midway filed its proposed plan of liquidation with the bankruptcy court. Under the plan, intercompany claims would be extinguished and a partial recovery would be allowed to the unsecured creditors of Midway Games (who held $155 million of claims) to the extent of about 16.5%, and to the unsecured creditors of Midway's subsidiaries (who held $36.7 million of claims) of about 25%. Any settlement amount under the lawsuit against National Amusements was to be paid to the two groups of unsecured creditors in the same ratio. Holders of secured and priority claims were to be paid in full, National Amusements would not receive any payment under its Subordinated Loan Agreement, and the equity holders would not receive any payment. On May 21, 2010, the bankruptcy court approved the plan of liquidation. Unsecured creditors of Midway shared approximately $25.5 million, and unsecured creditors of the company's subsidiaries shared about $9.2 million. A liquidating trust, administered by Buchwald Capital Advisors LLC as the Trustee, was created to pursue any remaining rights of Midway's bankruptcy estate and distribute any proceeds to Midway's remaining creditors.

On June 9, 2010, the company filed a Form 15 with the Securities and Exchange Commission, terminating the public registration of its securities. The creditors' settlement of their lawsuit against National Amusements, in the total amount of $1 million, was approved by the bankruptcy court on June 21, 2010, ending the outstanding claims against the Redstone family. Since December 2010, the trustee for the liquidating trust of the company, Buchwald Capital Advisors LLC, has filed 57 avoidance actions seeking to recover a total of $2,936,736 in transfers made by Midway to creditors prior to its bankruptcy filing. In March 2011, the court dismissed the adversary proceeding by Threshold Entertainment. All of Midway's remaining unsold assets, as well as the subsidiaries of the company itself, were completely dissolved shortly thereafter but the entity remains in existence as a shell company incorporated in Delaware. The Midway Games trademark and logo is currently owned by Warner Bros. upon the sale of Midway's assets in 2009.

== Subsidiaries and studios ==
=== Publishing and distribution ===
==== North America ====
- Midway Amusement Games, LLC, in Chicago, Illinois. The original arcade division of the company, founded as Midway Manufacturing Company. Its parts and service assets were acquired by Happ Controls on October 1, 2001, and the company exited the arcade games business, after which the subsidiary continued to exist to maintain its intellectual properties, specifically the libraries of Midway, Bally, and Williams. Former employees including Eugene Jarvis would later form Raw Thrills that same year.
- Midway Home Entertainment in San Diego, California. Founded in 1985 as Tradewest, in Corsicana, Texas, it acquired San Diego–based Cinematronics in 1987, then renamed it as a subsidiary, the Leland Corporation. Tradewest was then acquired by WMS Industries in 1994 to enter the home console market; previously home adaptations of Midway games were published under license by Acclaim Entertainment or others. It was renamed Williams Entertainment, Inc., which in turn became Midway Home Entertainment in 1996. The Texas and San Diego offices were consolidated in 2001. Midway Home Entertainment published and marketed all Midway video games made for home consoles.

==== Europe ====
- Midway Games Ltd. based in London, United Kingdom, published and distributed Midway's video games in the UK and other markets in Europe. On August 19, 2009, Midway Games Ltd. was sold to a company owned by Martin Spiess (who was previously an executive officer of Midway) and, together with Midway Games SAS, it was formed into a holding company called Spiess Media Holding UG. It was combined with the Paris office and re-branded Tradewest Games.
- Midway Games SAS in Paris published and distributed Midway video games in France. On August 19, 2009, Midway Games SAS was sold off to Spiess, along with Midway Games Ltd., and they were formed into Spiess Media Holding UG. It was combined with the London office and re-branded Tradewest Games.
- Midway Germany GmbH in Munich published and distributed Midway video games in Germany. The subsidiary was formed in February 2005 by Midway Games Ltd. In August 2009, Midway Germany GmbH was sold to former manager Uwe Fürstenberg's company F+F Publishing GmbH.

=== Studios ===
==== Sold ====
- Midway Studios Chicago was the original Midway arcade development studio, and was housed within the same facility as Midway Amusement Games in Chicago. After the company exited the arcade business in 2001, the studio focused solely on titles for home and portable consoles. It had developed Blitz: The League for the PlayStation 2 and Xbox and Stranglehold for the PlayStation 3, Xbox 360 and PC, and continued overseeing the Mortal Kombat series. Following its acquisition by Warner Bros, the studio was renamed WB Games Chicago. In June 2010, Warner Bros. rebranded it as NetherRealm Studios.
- Midway Studios San Diego, a successor to the Leland Corporation, it was located in the same building as Midway Home Entertainment and was the company's first studio to develop video games for home consoles. Midway Studios San Diego developed Gauntlet: Seven Sorrows and was given the task of completing the game Rise and Fall: Civilizations at War, which had been started by Stainless Steel Studios. The studio has worked on games such as the Ready 2 Rumble Boxing, Ready 2 Rumble Boxing: Round 2, the Cruis'n series, TNA Impact!, and Blitz: The League II. Midway announced on July 8, 2009, that it intended to close the San Diego studio by the beginning of September. However, in early August 2009, THQ bought the studio and its assets, renamed the studio as THQ San Diego, and about 40% of its employees were offered positions. THQ in turn declared bankruptcy at the end of 2012.
- Midway Games West, founded as Atari Games in 1985 from the arcade division of the original Atari, Inc. and acquired by Midway in 1996, it primarily produced arcade games. Although it ceased operations in 2003, Midway Games West continued to exist as a holding entity for its copyrights and trademarks. Its assets are now owned by Warner Bros. Games.
- Surreal Software in Seattle, Washington, founded in 1995, was acquired by Midway in 2004 and sold to Warner Bros. in July 2009.

==== Defunct ====
- Midway Studios Austin, founded as Inevitable Entertainment, Inc. on March 23, 2000, was acquired in 2004 and closed in December 2008.
- Midway Studios Australia in Adelaide, South Australia, was founded as Ratbag Games in 1993. It was acquired by Midway on August 4, 2005, and was closed four months later in December 2005.
- Midway Studios Los Angeles in Moorpark, California, founded in 1994 as Paradox Development, was acquired by Midway in 2004. It was closed in 2008 and merged with the San Diego studio.
- Midway Studios Newcastle in Newcastle upon Tyne, England, was founded in December 1996 as Pitbull Syndicate and acquired by Midway in October 2005. It was closed on July 14, 2009, following Midway's sale of assets to Warner Bros., because Midway failed to find a buyer for the studio. In 2009, some former employees of the studio formed a new company called Atomhawk Design. In 2010, game designer Robert Troughton, a founder of Pitbull Syndicate, formed another new company, Pitbull Studio, in Newcastle.

== List of games developed or licensed ==
=== Pinball ===
All games were released under the Bally brand, except as noted.

- The Addams Family (1992)
- Attack from Mars (1995)
- Baby Pac-Man (1982)
- Black Rose (1992)
- Corvette (1994)
- Creature from the Black Lagoon (1992)
- Doctor Who (1992)
- Dr. Dude and His Excellent Ray (1990)
- Elvira and the Party Monsters (1989)
- Escape from the Lost World (1987 – Bally/Midway)
- Flying Turns (1964 - Midway)
- Gilligan's Island (1991)
- Harley-Davidson (1991)
- Judge Dredd (1993)
- Lady Luck (1986 – Bally/Midway)
- Motordome (1986 – Bally/Midway)
- Mr. & Mrs. Pac-Man (1982)
- The Party Zone (1991)
- Popeye Saves the Earth (1994)
- Rodeo (1964 - Midway)
- Rotation VIII (1978 - Midway)
- Scared Stiff (1996)
- The Shadow (1994)
- 10 Pin Deluxe (1984 – Bally/Midway)
- Theatre of Magic (1995)
- The Twilight Zone (1993)
- World Cup Soccer (1994)
