= NHL 96 =

1995 ice hockey video game

- Cover art with Scott Stevens and Steve Yzerman
- Developers: EA Tiburon (SNES); High Score Entertainment (GEN); EA Canada (MS-DOS); Probe Entertainment (Game Boy)
- Publishers: EA Sports (GEN, SNES, MS-DOS); THQ (Game Boy)
- Producers: Rob Martyn (GEN, SNES)
- Designers: Scott Probin (GEN, SNES)
- Programmers: Mark Lesser (GEN); Jason Andersen (SNES)
- Composers: Jeff van Dyck (MS-DOS); David Whittaker (GEN); Brian L. Schmidt (SNES)
- Series: NHL
- Engine: Virtual Stadium
- Platforms: MS-DOS, Genesis, Super NES, Game Boy
- Release: Genesis, SNES, MS-DOS: NA: October 6, 1995; EU: October 1995; Game Boy: NA: November 1995
- Genre: Sports (ice hockey)
- Modes: Single-player, multiplayer

NHL 96 is a sports video game developed by EA Tiburon for the Super NES, High Score Entertainment for the Genesis, EA Canada for MS-DOS, and Probe Entertainment for the Game Boy. EA Sports published all versions of the game in 1995, except the Game Boy version, which was published by THQ. The game is based on the sport of ice hockey and puts the player in control of a hockey team in modes of play such as exhibitions, seasons and playoffs. It is the fifth installment in the NHL game series.

NHL 96 is the first entry in the series with real-time three-dimensional graphics through the MS-DOS version's "Virtual Stadium" technology. The game also has improved and adjustable opponent artificial intelligence, a previously barred ability to engage in physical fights, new moves such as the spin-o-rama, and general enhancements to the visual animations and audio. NHL 96 was met with critical acclaim, with reviewers commending the game's opponent AI, fluid graphics, and added gameplay features.

== Gameplay ==
An example of gameplay in the DOS version; the player is currently in control of Dean McAmmond of the Edmonton Oilers. Through the DOS version's "Virtual Stadium" technology, NHL 96 is the first entry in the series to feature real-time 3D graphics.

NHL 96 puts the player in control of either accurate real-life hockey team rosters from the 1994–95 NHL season or customized teams and players. As one of any given player, the controlling player can skate about the rink and stick-handle the puck in any direction, and can move with a short burst of speed with a certain input. When on the offensive, the player can dump the puck into the opposing team's zone, pass the puck to another player, take or fake shots, and execute a spin-o-rama. When on the defensive, the player can hold or hook, hit the ice to block shots, poke check, and body check. Goalies can be manually or automatically controlled, the state of which can be toggled in the main menu. Manually-controlled goalies can dive, poke check, and make save attempts. The player takes control of their goalie if they have saved the puck regardless of the manual or auto setting. In this stage, the player can either flip the puck out of their team's zone, pass to an open teammate, clear the puck along the boards, or draw a face-off by avoiding any input, at which point the referee will blow his whistle and call the puck dead. The skill level of computer-controlled opponents can be adjusted to "Rookie", "Pro" or "All-Star" in the main menu.

If a player violates one of several infractions (including holding, hooking, goalie-interference, etc.), the player is directed to the penalty box to wait out the duration of his penalty time, which may be two or four minutes depending on whether the player on the receiving end of the violation is injured. Among these infractions is fighting; the players are capable of getting into physical fights during heated moments in the game, and this feature can be toggled on or off in the main menu. If an opponent squares off against the player, the player can either press any button to drop their gloves and initiate a brawl or avoid any action for four seconds; the latter option will prompt the referee to intervene and call roughing penalties. During a fight, the player can throw punches to the opponent's head, send uppercuts, grab and pull the opponent's jersey, skate back and forth, and block incoming punches. Players who get involved in a fight are given five-minute major penalties. The end of a player's time in the penalty box is signified by six tones. Penalties can be toggled on or off in the main menu.

The game's scoreboard is displayed between periods and any time the game is paused. Along with reviewing basic ongoing game information, the player can view instant replays, change their goalie, edit their winger lines, call a time-out (this option is only available once per game), or abort the game in progress. The players can fatigue and decline in performance quality over time; editing the lines or calling a time-out refreshes the players' stamina. In addition to the cycling of lines being performed manually or automatically before each face-off, the ability of the players to fatigue can be toggled on or off in the main menu. If the player's team is on a power play, the amount of alternate lines they have access to is restricted.

=== Modes ===
NHL 96 features six modes of gameplay: Regular Game, Playoffs, Playoffs Best of 7, Season, Shootout, and Transactions; the Playoffs, Playoffs Best of 7 and Shootout modes are absent from the SNES version. The Regular Game mode is a single exhibition game in which the player can play against computer-controlled or human opponents. In the default Playoffs mode, eight teams from each conference engage in a single-game-elimination tournament. The Playoffs Best-of-7 mode is a closer reflection of the real-life NHL playoffs. The Season mode is a play-through of an entire 84-game season, complete with a best-of-7 playoff tournament and season-end awards ceremony. In the Shootout mode, the player can practice their penalty shot technique in a five-round shootout contest between any two teams.

In the Transactions mode, the player assumes the role of a general manager and creates, trades, and releases players, and signs free agents. The player can create and edit up to 19 new players and add them to a pool of free agents. The free agent pool is formed from all unassigned players, which includes newly created players and existing players who have been released from their team's roster. Created players can be named and customized by team position, stick handedness, body weight, jersey number, and a series of attributes that can be configured using a limited number of points. When trading players, multiple players can be involved at a time, but no more than three from a team per transaction. Any attempt to stack a team will be rejected. Each team's roster must carry between 17 and 27 players, including two or three goalies.

== Development and release ==
The Genesis version was programmed by Mark Lesser, who had previously programmed John Madden Football '93, NHL '94 and NHL 95. The SNES version was programmed by Jason Andersen. A coaching feature was planned for the game, but was dropped late in the development cycle. NHL 96 is the first entry in the series to include physical fights between players following an absence of the feature in previous installments that was enforced by the NHL to promote a more wholesome image of the sport. This reversal of policy was brought about by a determined appeal from EA Canada and on the condition that the fights were limited to one or two times per game. It is also the first entry to feature real-time 3D graphics; the DOS version incorporates the "Virtual Stadium" technology previously used in FIFA Soccer 96, which allows the game to be seen from 11 different angles and to feature such details as reflections in the ice, corporate logos on the sideboards and more accurate team logos and jersey colors. The DOS version includes 668 printable high-resolution color photographs of the game's players made in collaboration with sports card manufacturer Donruss, as well as video interviews of NHL players and video highlights from the 1994–95 NHL season. The game's audio incorporates crowd chants and organ tunes specific to the stadium being played, and features the 2 Unlimited song "Get Ready for This" as a musical track. The cover of the game features Steve Yzerman and Scott Stevens, then team captains of 1995 Stanley Cup finalists the Detroit Red Wings and New Jersey Devils respectively.

The Genesis, SNES and DOS versions of NHL 96 were shipped to stores in North America on September 30, 1995 and released on October 6, 1995 to coincide with the opening of the 1995–96 NHL season. The same versions were released in Europe the same month. A Game Gear version was advertised, but not released. The Game Boy version was released in North America on November and carries the NHL league license, but not an NHL player's license; as a result, the game features official team names and logos, but no existing player rosters. A version for the PlayStation was announced the same month, but later cancelled because it did not meet Electronic Arts' quality standards. A version for the 3DO was also planned.

== Reception ==
Reception

Review scores
Publication	Score
Electronic Gaming Monthly	7.75/10 (Genesis)
GamePro	4.5/5 (Genesis); 3.625/5 (SNES)
GameSpot	7.9/10 (DOS)
Next Generation	5/5 (Genesis, SNES); 4/5 (DOS)
PC Gamer (US)	90% (DOS)
PCMag	3/4
Game Players	96% (Genesis); 89% (SNES)

The Genesis version of NHL 96 received highly positive reviews and is widely considered to be the best installment in the franchise. A critic for Next Generation commented that the game took the basics of NHL 95, "arguably the best sports simulation product ever", and added new features which served to only improve upon the gameplay of the series. They added that the opponent AI had been improved, and were also pleased with the more detailed player graphics, new sound effects, greater strategy with new ways to score, ability to create players, and more complex fighting mechanics. They concluded, "The only thing possibly wrong with this game is that every other sports game in your library may pale in comparison." Mike Salmon of Game Players declared that "the superb gameplay of the '95 version has only gotten better with time", and commended the game's sharp graphics, enhanced audio, tougher AI, and added techniques and features. Air Hendrix of GamePro gave the Genesis version a resoundingly positive review, applauding the new moves, the return of the fighting feature, the improved opponent AI, and the fluidly animated player sprites. Video Cowboy and the Iceman of Electronic Gaming Monthly also gave their approval of the Genesis version, particularly praising the improved opponent AI.

The SNES version was also received positively, though less so than its Genesis counterpart. Next Generation noted that the SNES version has sharper graphics and more animation than the Genesis version, but determined it to be slightly inferior overall due to the rougher gameplay and AI. Salmon stated that while the SNES entry had sharper graphics and gameplay than its predecessors, the combination of a less solid AI and faster gameplay pace led to a lower amount of challenge and capacity for strategy than the Genesis version. Game Players subsequently referred to NHL 96 as "far and away the best Super NES sports title". Quick-Draw McGraw of GamePro remarked that the SNES version had muddier graphics and less content than the Genesis version, the fights were dull and hard to control, and the "weak" audio was comparable to "listening to the game from the parking lot".

Reviewing the DOS version, Todd Vaughn of PC Gamer praised the game's detailed graphics (particularly when higher resolutions are enabled), realistic and challenging gameplay, and modem-enabled multiplayer capability, though noted that not all of the game's camera angles were optimal for gameplay, and that the system requirements were steep. Next Generation's reviewer was less enthusiastic about the DOS version than the console versions, but their complaint was with the graphics and extreme slowness of the SVGA mode "on even high-end 486s." However, they gave the game an overall strong recommendation for its realistic features and many special moves. Hugo Foster of GameSpot criticized that the games are too frequently scoreless, and that success and failure seem to be largely random. He added that the game "is still fun to play", and praised the fluidly animated graphics and the precise controls. Michael E. Ryan of PC Magazine said "NHL 96 clearly stands head and shoulders above" other PC hockey games: "great graphics and sound, fast-paced action, and an accurate statistical model". Even non-hockey fans, he said, "may be stunned by the quality".

NHL 96 was the 9th highest-renting SNES title and the 6th highest-renting Genesis title at Blockbuster Video in its opening month. Game Players named NHL 96 the best Genesis game of 1995. GamePro awarded the Genesis version 2nd Best Sports Game of 1995. In GamePro's "1995 Readers' Choice Awards", the Genesis version was ranked the fourth Best Sports Game (16-Bit Games), taking 11% of the vote. Computer Games Strategy Plus named NHL 96 the best computer sports game of 1995. NPD Group analyst Mat Piscatella reported that the SNES version of NHL 96 was the third highest-selling retro title of April 2018.
