= Dieter Ruehle =

American stadium organist

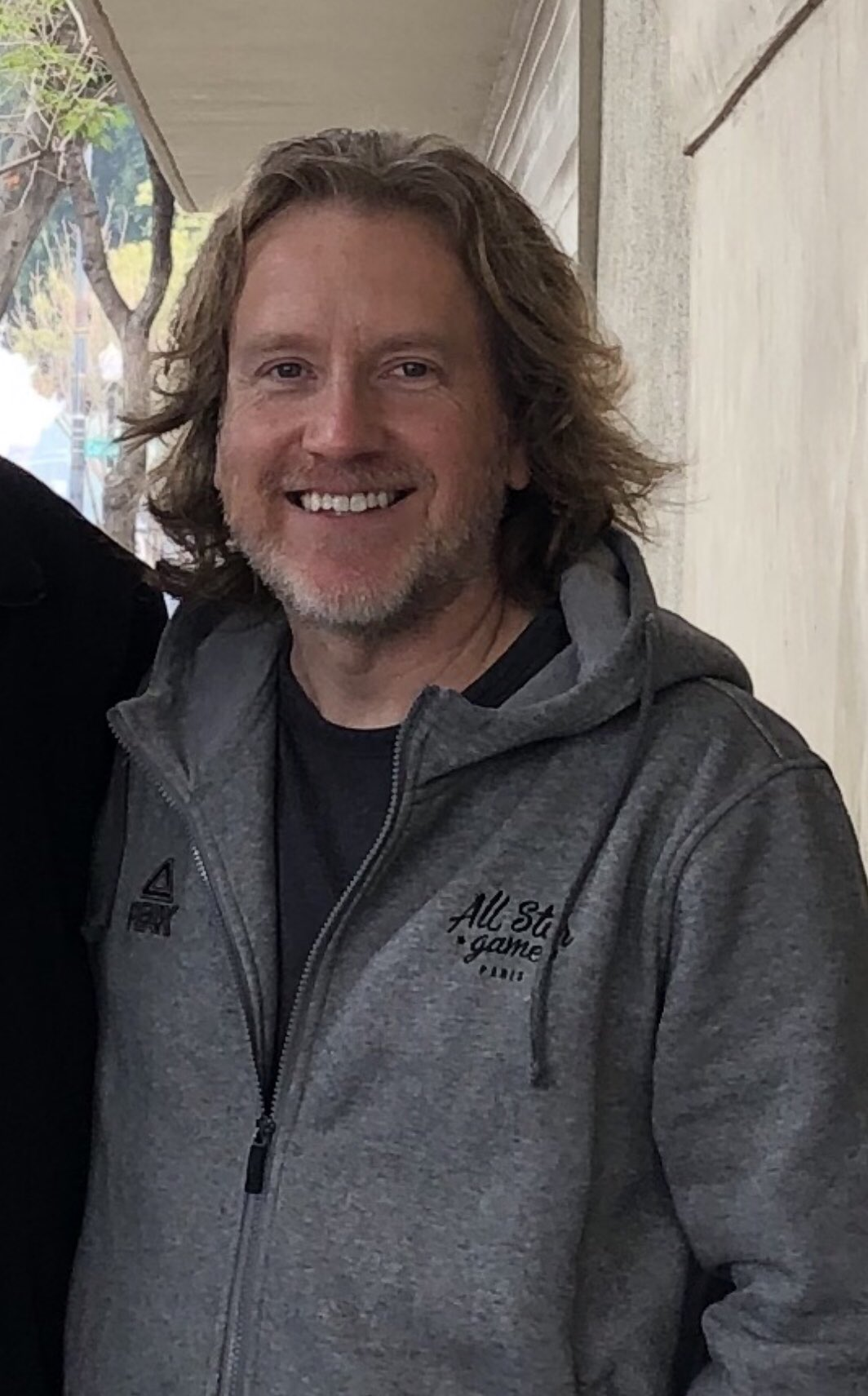
Ruehle in 2020

Dieter Ruehle (born in 1968) is an American musician who is the stadium organist for Major League Baseball's Los Angeles Dodgers, National Hockey League's Los Angeles Kings. and National Basketball Association's Los Angeles Lakers. As of December 2024, Ruehle has played for three championship teams in three different sports: the Dodgers in 2020, 2024, and 2025; the Lakers in 2002, 2009, and 2010; and the Kings in 2012 and 2014. He plays also since 2002 in Salt Lake City the organ at the Ice hockey competition of the Winter Olympic Games.

== Major League work ==
Ruehle has been with the Kings since 1989—taking a six-year break between 1992 and 1998—and has been the Dodgers’ full-time organist since 2016, replacing Nancy Bea Hefley, for whom he had filled in since 2013. He has occasionally played organ for both teams' games in a single day. When the NHL and NBA played games in China, Ruehle played organ for the NBA games in 2013 in Beijing and Shanghai and for the NHL in 2017 in the same cities.

He played organ for the Los Angeles Lakers from 2001 to 2016, forming a working relationship with Kobe Bryant. The two worked together on Bryant's podcast "The Punies". Ruehle returned as the Lakers' full-time organist in 2026. He has also played for the San Jose Sharks for five seasons, from 1992 through 1997, and the Phoenix Coyotes for the 1997–98 season.

== Other sports ==
Ruehle has played at seven different Olympic games. He played at the Sochi Olympics with Ray Castoldi, the Madison Square Garden organist who Ruehle cites as a big influence. They ran the musical show at the Shayba Ice Arena and Bolshoy Ice Dome. His other Olympic stints were Winter 2002 in Salt Lake (Ice Hockey), Summer 2004 in Athens (Basketball), Winter 2006 in Torino (Ice Hockey), and Winter 2010 in Vancouver (Ice Hockey). He was the official tournament DJ for the US Open Men's & Women's Tennis Championships from 2006 through 2015.

Ruehle has played organ music on the video games NHL '94, NHL '95 and NHL '96 for EA Sports. Ruehle provided songs for all the team, including additional information such as "... which music was blasted during power plays, which tunes were used to celebrate goals."

== Gear and technique ==
At Dodger Stadium, Ruehle plays a Roland Atelier AT-80s organ. He also uses an Instant Replay, a hard disc audio playback system, for in-game pre-recorded music and a compact electronic drum machine. Ruehle, along with other contemporary organists Josh Kantor and Matthew Kaminski will interact with fans over Twitter and will sometimes use his musical choices for comical effect. During the COVID-19 pandemic, Ruehle added other songs to his repertoire such as "Hush" by Deep Purple and "Enjoy the Silence" by Depeche Mode.

== Early life and education ==
Ruehle was born in Van Nuys and grew up in North Hollywood and Burbank. His father is German American and his mother is Mexican American. He was a fan of both the Dodgers and the Kings growing up. He took classical piano lessons growing up and graduated from Burbank High School in 1986.

Ruehle was inspired by Nancy Faust, stadium organist for the Chicago White Sox. His first time playing at a Kings game was as a result of writing a letter to local TV station KABC-TV which was running a "Sports Fantasy" segment. Ruehle, who was twelve at the time, said his fantasy was to play for the Kings and he played for the team's first period. He was the organist for the Los Angeles Lazers of the Major Indoor Soccer League when he was 15, playing there until the league folded.
