= EA Vancouver =

Canadian video game developer owned by Electronic Arts

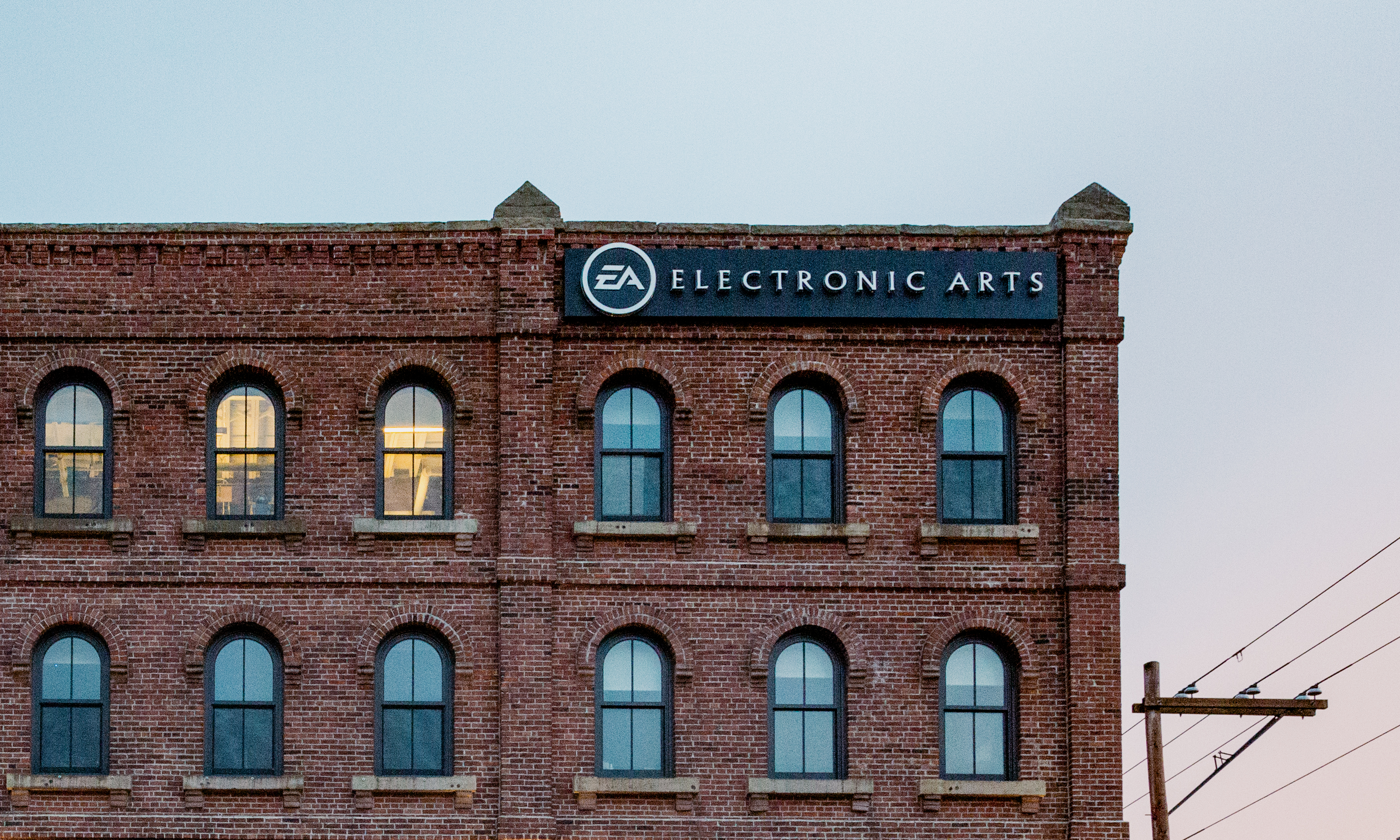
- Former EA Canada offices
- Formerly: EA Burnaby; EA Canada
- Type: Division
- Industry: Video games
- Predecessors: Distinctive Software; EA Black Box
- Founded: 1991; 35 years ago (as EA Canada)
- Fate: Acquired by Electronic Arts in 1991
- Headquarters: Burnaby, BC, Canada
- Products: Video games
- Brands: List: EA Sports FC series (2023–present); NHL series (1991–present); FIFA series (1993–2022); SSX series (2000–2012); NFS series (1994–2000, see EA Black Box); Skate series (2007–2010, see EA Black Box)
- Number of employees: 1,300
- Parent: EA Sports

EA Vancouver (formerly known as EA Burnaby, then EA Canada) is a Canadian video game developer located in Burnaby, British Columbia. The development studio opened as Distinctive Software in January 1983, and is also Electronic Arts's largest and oldest studio. EA Vancouver employs approximately 1,300 people, and houses the world's largest video game test operation.

It is best known for developing a lot of EA Sports and EA Sports BIG titles, including EA Sports FC (formerly FIFA), NHL, SSX, NBA Street, NFL Street, EA Sports UFC, and FIFA Street titles, as well as a number of NBA Live and NCAA Basketball titles between 1994 and 2009.

== Premises ==
The campus consists of a motion-capture studio, twenty-two rooms for composing, fourteen video editing suites, three production studios, a wing for audio compositions, and a quality assurance department. There are also facilities such as fitness rooms, two theatres, a cafeteria, coffee bars, a soccer field, and several arcades.

== History ==
Electronic Arts (EA), based in Redwood City, California, acquired Distinctive Software in 1991 for $11 million and renamed Distinctive Software to "EA Canada". At the time of the business acquisition, Distinctive Software was noted for developing a number of racing and sporting games published under the Accolade brand.

=== Distinctive Software ===
Distinctive Software, Inc.
- Industry: Video games
- Founded: 1982; 44 years ago
- Defunct: 1991
- Fate: Merged into EA Canada
- Successor: EA Canada
- Headquarters: Burnaby, British Columbia, Canada
- Key people: Don Mattrick; Jeff Sember; Paul Lee; Tarrnie Williams; Bruce McMillan
- Products: Test Drive series 4D Sports series

Distinctive Software, Inc. was a Canadian video game developer established in Burnaby, British Columbia, by Don Mattrick and Jeff Sember after their success with the game Evolution. Mattrick (age 17) and Jeff Sember approached Sydney Development Corporation, who agreed to publish Evolution in 1982. Distinctive Software was known in the late 1980s and early 1990s for their racing and sports video games, including the Test Drive series, Stunts, 4D Boxing, and Hardball II. In 1991, Distinctive was acquired by Electronic Arts in a deal worth US$10 million and became EA Canada, which is where the most EA Sports branded games are developed.

==== Unlimited Software and lawsuit ====
In 1989, programmers Pete Gardner and Amory Wong of Distinctive, under the pseudonym USI (Unlimited Software, Inc.), converted Sega's arcade game Out Run for MS-DOS. They used several software libraries they had developed for Test Drive II. Consequently, Accolade charged that Distinctive violated a working agreement, and sued. Accolade sought a preliminary injunction against the distribution and sale of Out Run. Distinctive Software argued that it had only used source code that did routine functions, such as clearing the video screen and that Accolade did not own a copyright on those functions. Accolade argued that their contract for Test Drive II gave them the ownership and copyright of the final product—the game—and the source code used to create it. Distinctive Software won; the court ruled that "the licensing agreement transfers to Accolade the copyright to the concept and design of the video game but not the underlying source code." The court also found that Accolade had failed to demonstrate that the balance of hardships was in its favour.

=== EA Canada ===
Since becoming EA Canada, EA Canada has developed many EA Games, EA Sports, and EA Sports BIG games.

EA Seattle, formerly Manley & Associates, was closed in 2002. Half the jobs were moved to EA Vancouver.

EA acquired Black Box Games in 2002 and Black Box Games became part of EA Canada under the name of EA Black Box. EA Black Box later became an independent EA studio in 2005. After its acquisition, EA Black Box became the home of several franchises, such as Need for Speed and Skate. The studio was later shut down in 2013, after a series of restructurings and layoffs within EA.

In 2011, EA Canada acquired Bight Games, a maker of freemium games.

== Games developed ==
=== By Distinctive Software ===
Game	Published	Publisher	Platform
4D Sports Boxing	1991	Mindscape/Electronic Arts	Amiga, Atari ST, MS-DOS, Mac
4D Sports Tennis	1990	Mindscape	MS-DOS
Accolade Comics	1987	Accolade	Apple II, C64
Ace of Aces	1987	Accolade	Atari 8-bit, C64, MS-DOS
After Burner	1988	Sega	Amiga, C64, MS-DOS
Altered Beast	1990	Sega	Amiga, C64, MS-DOS
Bill Elliott's NASCAR Challenge	1990	Konami	Amiga, handheld, Mac, NES, MS-DOS
Castlevania	1990	Konami	C64, MS-DOS
Champions Forever Boxing	1992	NEC	TG-16
Dick Tracy: The Crime-Solving Adventure	1991	Walt Disney Computer Software	Amiga, MS-DOS
Grand Prix Circuit	1988	Accolade	Amiga, Apple IIGS, C64, MS-DOS
Fight Night	1985	Accolade	Apple II, Atari 8-bit, C64
Hardball!	1985	Accolade	Apple IIGS, C64
Mario Andretti's Racing Challenge	1991	Electronic Arts	MS-DOS
Metal Gear	1990	Ultra Games	C64
Mission: Impossible	1991	Konami	MS-DOS
Out Run	1989	Sega	C64, MS-DOS
Pipe Dream	1990	Bullet-Proof Software	Amiga, C64, MS-DOS, NES
Stunts (4D Sports Driving)	1990	Broderbund/Mindscape	Amiga, MS-DOS
Super C	1990	Konami	Amiga, MS-DOS
Teenage Mutant Ninja Turtles	1990	Ultra Games/Konami	Amiga, C64, MS-DOS
Teenage Mutant Ninja Turtles: Manhattan Missions	1991	Konami	MS-DOS
Test Drive	1987	Accolade	Amiga, C64, MS-DOS
The Cycles: International Grand Prix Racing	1989	Accolade	C64, MS-DOS
The Duel: Test Drive II	1989	Accolade	Amiga, Apple IIGS, C64, MS-DOS
The Simpsons: Bart's House of Weirdness	1992	Konami	MS-DOS
Top Gun: Guts and Glory	1993	Konami	Game Boy
Where in Time Is Carmen Sandiego?	1991	Konami	NES

=== By EA Canada ===
Year	Title	Platform(s)
1994	Skitchin'	Sega Genesis
1998	ReBoot	PlayStation
2011	FIFA 12	Microsoft Windows, Nintendo 3DS, Nintendo Wii, PlayStation 2, PlayStation 3, Xbox 360
2011	Fight Night Champion	PlayStation 3, Xbox 360
2011	NBA Jam: On Fire Edition	PlayStation 3, Xbox 360
2011	NHL 12	PlayStation 3, Xbox 360
2012	FIFA 13	Microsoft Windows, Nintendo 3DS, PlayStation 2, PlayStation 3, Wii, Xbox 360
2012	FIFA Street	PlayStation 3, Xbox 360
2012	Grand Slam Tennis 2	PlayStation 3, Xbox 360
2012	NHL 13	PlayStation 3, Xbox 360
2012	SSX	PlayStation 3, Xbox 360
2012	UEFA Euro 2012	Microsoft Windows, PlayStation 3, Xbox 360
2013	FIFA 14	Microsoft Windows, PlayStation 2, PlayStation 3, PlayStation 4, Xbox 360, Xbox One
2013	NHL 14	PlayStation 3, Xbox 360
2014	2014 FIFA World Cup Brazil	PlayStation 3, Xbox 360
2014	EA Sports UFC	PlayStation 4, Xbox One
2014	FIFA 15	Microsoft Windows, Nintendo 3DS, PlayStation 3, PlayStation 4, PlayStation Vita, Xbox 360, Xbox One
2014	NHL 15	PlayStation 3, PlayStation 4, Xbox 360, Xbox One
2015	EA Sports UFC	Android, iOS
2015	FIFA 16	Microsoft Windows, PlayStation 3, PlayStation 4, Xbox 360, Xbox One
2015	NHL 16	PlayStation 3, PlayStation 4, Xbox 360, Xbox One
2016	EA Sports UFC 2	PlayStation 4, Xbox One
2016	FIFA 17	Microsoft Windows, PlayStation 3, PlayStation 4, Xbox 360, Xbox One
2016	FIFA Mobile	Android, iOS, Windows Apps, Windows Phone
2016	NHL 17	PlayStation 4, Xbox One
2017	FIFA 18	Microsoft Windows, Nintendo Switch, PlayStation 3, PlayStation 4, Xbox 360, Xbox One
2017	NHL 18	PlayStation 4, Xbox One
2018	EA Sports UFC 3	PlayStation 4, Xbox One
2018	FIFA 19	Microsoft Windows, Nintendo Switch, PlayStation 3, PlayStation 4, Xbox 360, Xbox One
2018	NHL 19	PlayStation 4, Xbox One
2019	FIFA 20	Microsoft Windows, Nintendo Switch, PlayStation 4, Xbox One
2019	NHL 20	PlayStation 4, Xbox One
2020	EA Sports UFC 4	PlayStation 4, Xbox One
2020	FIFA 21	Microsoft Windows, Nintendo Switch, PlayStation 4, Xbox One, PlayStation 5, Xbox Series X, Stadia
2020	NHL 21	PlayStation 4, Xbox One
2021	FIFA 22	Microsoft Windows, Nintendo Switch, PlayStation 4, Xbox One, PlayStation 5, Xbox Series X, Stadia
2021	NHL 22	PlayStation 4, Xbox One, PlayStation 5, Xbox Series X and Series S
2022	FIFA 23	Microsoft Windows, Nintendo Switch, PlayStation 4, Xbox One, PlayStation 5, Xbox Series X and Series S
2022	NHL 23	PlayStation 4, Xbox One, PlayStation 5, Xbox Series X and Series S
2023	EA FC 24	Microsoft Windows, Nintendo Switch, PlayStation 4, Xbox One, PlayStation 5, Xbox Series X and Series S
2023	NHL 24	PlayStation 4, Xbox One, PlayStation 5, Xbox Series X and Series S
2023	EA Sports UFC 5	PlayStation 5, Xbox Series X and Series S
2024	EA Sports FC 25	Microsoft Windows, Nintendo Switch, PlayStation 4, Xbox One, PlayStation 5, Xbox Series X and Series S
2024	NHL 25	PlayStation 5, Xbox Series X and Series S
2025	EA Sports FC 26	Microsoft Windows, Nintendo Switch, Nintendo Switch 2, PlayStation 4, Xbox One, PlayStation 5, Xbox Series X and Series S
2025	NHL 26	PlayStation 5, Xbox Series X and Series S
2026	EA Sports FC 27	Microsoft Windows, Nintendo Switch, Nintendo Switch 2, PlayStation 4, Xbox One, PlayStation 5, Xbox Series X and Series S
2026	NHL 27	PlayStation 5, Xbox Series X and Series S

=== EA Sports ===
Games developed for publishing by EA Sports:

- 3 on 3 NHL Arcade
- 2002 FIFA World Cup
- 2006 FIFA World Cup
- 2010 FIFA World Cup South Africa
- 2014 FIFA World Cup Brazil
- EA Sports UFC
- EA Sports UFC 2
- EA Sports UFC 3
- EA Sports UFC 4
- EA Sports UFC 5
- FIFA International Soccer
- FIFA Soccer 95
- FIFA Soccer 96
- FIFA 97
- FIFA: Road to World Cup 98
- FIFA 99
- FIFA 2000
- FIFA 2001
- FIFA Football 2002
- FIFA Football 2003
- FIFA Football 2004
- FIFA Football 2005
- FIFA 06
- FIFA 07
- FIFA 08
- FIFA 09
- FIFA 10
- FIFA 11
- FIFA 12
- FIFA 13
- FIFA 14
- FIFA 15
- FIFA 16
- FIFA 17
- FIFA 18
- FIFA 19
- FIFA 20
- FIFA 21
- FIFA 22
- FIFA 23
- EA Sports FC 24
- EA Sports FC 25
- EA Sports FC 26
- EA Sports FC 27
- FIFA Street (2012)
- FIFA Manager 06
- FIFA Online
- FaceBreaker
- Fight Night Round 4
- Fight Night Champion
- Grand Slam Tennis
- Celebrity Sports Showdown
- Cricket 07
- John Madden Football '93 (Super NES)
- Knockout Kings
- Madden NFL 07 (Wii)
- MVP 06 NCAA Baseball
- NBA Live 95
- NBA Live 96
- NBA Live 97
- NBA Live 98
- NBA Live 99
- NBA Live 2000
- NBA Live 2001
- NBA Live 2002
- NBA Live 2003
- NBA Live 2004
- NBA Live 2005
- NBA Live 06
- NBA Live 07
- NBA Live 08
- NBA Live 09
- NBA Live 10
- NCAA March Madness 98
- NCAA March Madness 99
- NCAA March Madness 2000
- NCAA March Madness 2001
- NCAA March Madness 2002
- NCAA March Madness 2003
- NCAA March Madness 2004
- NCAA March Madness 2005
- NCAA March Madness 06
- NCAA March Madness 07
- NCAA March Madness 08
- NCAA Basketball 09
- NCAA Basketball 10
- NHL '94
- NHL 95
- NHL 96
- NHL 97
- NHL 98
- NHL 99
- NHL 2000
- NHL 2001
- NHL 2002
- NHL 2003
- NHL 2004
- NHL 2005
- NHL 06
- NHL 07
- NHL 08
- NHL 09
- NHL 10
- NHL 11
- NHL 12
- NHL 13
- NHL 14
- NHL 15
- NHL 16
- NHL 17
- NHL 18
- NHL 19
- NHL 20
- NHL 21
- NHL 22
- NHL 23
- NHL 24
- NHL 25
- NHL 26
- NHL 27
- Rugby 2005
- Rugby 06
- SSX (2012)
- Total Club Manager 2005
- Triple Play 96
- Triple Play 2000
- UEFA Champions League 2006–2007
- UEFA Euro 2004
- UEFA Euro 2008
- UEFA Euro 2012
- World Cup 98

=== EA Sports BIG ===
Games developed for publishing by EA Sports BIG:

- Def Jam Vendetta
- FaceBreaker
- FIFA Street (2005)
- FIFA Street 2
- FIFA Street 3
- Freekstyle
- NBA Street
- NBA Street Vol. 2
- NBA Street V3
- NFL Street
- NFL Street 2
- NFL Street 3
- NFL Tour
- Sled Storm
- SSX (2000)
- SSX Tricky
- SSX 3
- SSX on Tour
- SSX Blur

== See also ==
- Project Ragtag, assisted in development
