= YM Biosciences =

YM BioSciences
- Industry: Pharmaceutics; Biotechnology
- Founded: 1992
- Founders: David Allan (CEO); Tarrnie Williams (Director)
- Defunct: 2013
- Fate: Merged into Gilead Sciences
- Successor: Gilead Sciences
- Headquarters: Toronto, Ontario, Canada
- Products: CYT-387
- Revenue: $21 million In 2012
- Website: www.ymbiosciences.com

YM BioSciences Inc. was a Canadian drug development company primarily focused on advancing CYT-387, an orally administered inhibitor of both the JAK1 and JAK2 kinases, which have been implicated in a number of hematological and immune cell disorders including myeloproliferative neoplasms and inflammatory diseases as well as certain cancers. YM BioSciences also had several preclinical programs underway with candidates from its library of compounds identified through internal research conducted at YM BioSciences Australia.

The company also advanced other clinical-stage products, including Nimotuzumab, an EGFR-targeting monoclonal antibody, and CYT997, a vascular disrupting agent (VDA).

The company was listed on the Toronto Stock Exchange and the New York Stock Exchange.

YM BioSciences was the first company from any major-market country to enter into a relationship with the Cuban Government for the development of a number of that country's biopharmaceuticals, with first licenses concluding in 1995. In 1994, the company created a joint venture with Centro de Inmunología Molecular (CCIMAB) in Cuba called CIMYM BioSciences. The joint venture developed the Nimotuzumab drug.

In February 2013, Gilead Sciences completed the acquisition of YM Biosciences for US$510 million.

== Nimotuzumab research ==
YM BioSciences' principal medicine of interest was a monoclonal antibody – Nimotuzumab – targeting the epidermal growth factor receptor. YM BioSciences received Orphan Drug Designation from the FDA for Nimotuzumab in 2004 and received a number of single-patient IND clearances starting in 2005. After receiving approval from the Office of Foreign Asset Control in March 200, the first patient was treated at Doernbecher Children's Hospital of Oregon Health and Science University for inoperable, recurrent, diffuse intrinsic pontine glioma. That approval was extended to unlimited clinical use. In August 2007, YM BioSciences received clearance from the FDA to conduct a Phase II trial. That trial was conducted at seven leading cancer institutes across the United States, including Memorial Sloan-Kettering, M.D. Anderson, Johns Hopkins, University of Florida, Vanderbilt Children's Hospital, Children's Hospital/University of Colorado and NYU Medical Center.

This was the first IND in history ever cleared by the United States FDA for clinical trials with Cuban-origin biopharmaceuticals and certainly the first Orphan Drug designation.

In 2010, after investing many years of lobbying the United States State Department, and, specifically, as a consequence of the assistance from Senators John Kerry, Christopher Dodd and Richard Lugar, YM was cleared by the Office of Foreign Assets Control to import Nimotuzumab for unlimited clinical development and was cleared by the FDA for Phase II trials in both Non-Small Cell Lung cancer and Brain Metastases from NSCLC.

In Canada, in June 2007, the company received clearance from Health Canada to begin a Phase II trial of nimotuzumab in colorectal cancer patients who had not responded to previous treatments.
