= Tarrnie Williams =

Canadian businessman (born 1940)

Tryon "Tarrnie" M. Williams
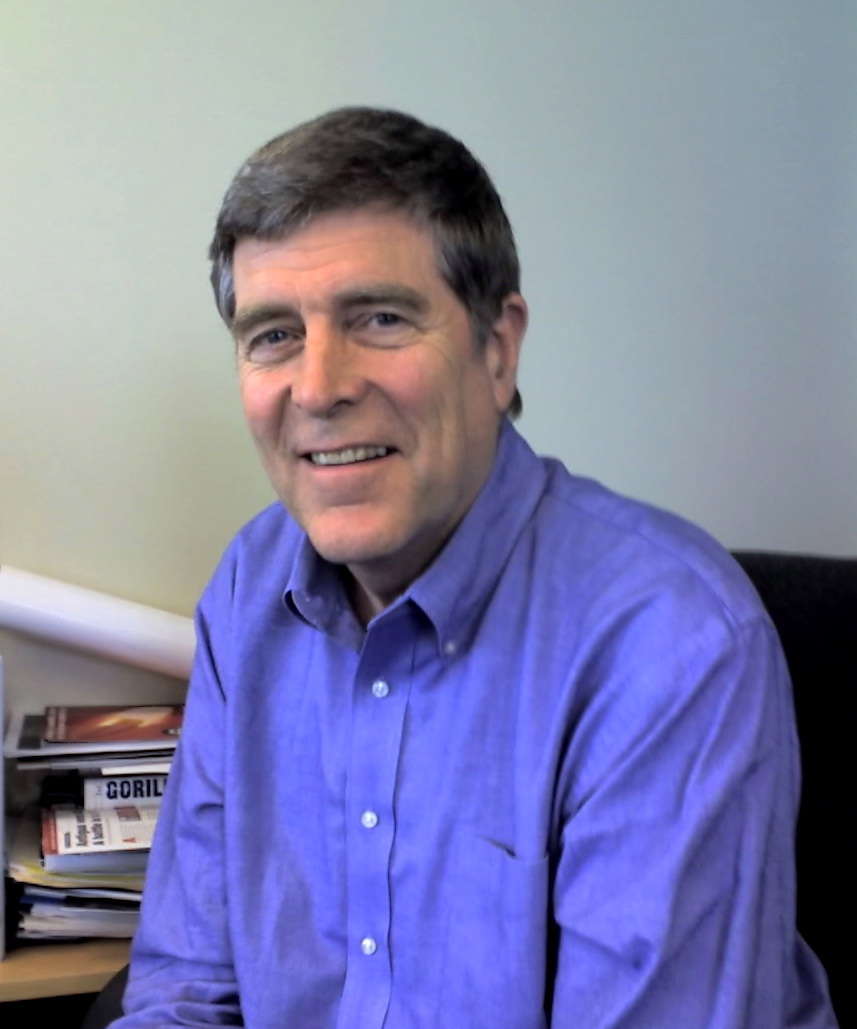
- Born: November 11, 1940 (age 85); Montreal, Quebec, Canada
- Known for: work in IBM; Distinctive Software, Inc; Electronic Arts; International Murex; YM BioSciences; PNI Digital Media; Bingo.com; Shoal Games Ltd.; Kidoz Inc.

Tryon "Tarrnie" M. Williams (born November 11, 1940) is a Canadian businessman. He is the founder of Canada's first publicly traded software company, Sydney Development Corporation formed in 1978. From 1987 to 1991 he was President and CEO of Distinctive Software Inc. of Vancouver. After the acquisition of that company by Electronic Arts Inc., he became President and CEO of Electronic Arts (Canada) Inc.

== Biography ==
Born in Montreal, Quebec, he traveled to western Canada early in life. He obtained a BSc (mathematics) in 1963 from the University of Alberta after studying mechanical engineering for three years at McGill University in Québec. After university he worked as an actuarial student for Standard Life Insurance Corporation in Montréal, followed by two years in sales in the mutual fund industry.

In 1965, Williams joined the Canadian Corporation for the World Exposition (Expo 67) as a project manager responsible for multiple projects in the field of communications and computers. He then moved to Vancouver and joined IBM where he worked for 10 years initially in systems design, then sales, then management education and finally in various management roles.

Williams resigned from IBM in 1978 to found Canada's first public software company, Sydney Development Corporation (SDC), The company developed an online real-time project management system for mainframe computers, then business applications for minicomputers. It became the first developer and publisher of computer games for microcomputers in Canada. SDC was the fastest-growing public company in Canada in the five-year period 1978 to 1983 with fiscal year 1983 revenues of $21 million (equivalent to $68 million in 2025).

Williams left SDC, at the beginning of the biotech industry, to co-found Proteus Bio-Research Corporation. The company developed a monoclonal antibody to identify the AIDS virus. Proteus joined with Murex, founded by Gwynn R. Williams, to form International Murex, which was sold to Abbot Laboratories for $234 million.

After joining International Murex, in 1987 he returned to Distinctive Software, a spin-off from SDC, as president. Williams was instrumental in growing Distinctive with Don Mattrick and Paul Lee, before it was bought by Electronic Arts for $11 million in 1991 (equivalent to $26 million in 2025), and then helping Electronic Arts (Canada) develop into a 125-person organization with a management team that reported revenue of $31 million (Canadian) in fiscal year 1993. He was the president and CEO of EA (Canada) Ltd. and a member of the seven-man executive team of Electronic Arts in California. In 1993 he was diagnosed with secondary progressive multiple sclerosis and left Electronic Arts to concentrate on his health.

During the ten-year period he became an adjunct professor at the University of British Columbia, Sauder School of Business as well as mentoring over 25 small businesses in various technologies and life-sciences.

He was a founding director of YM BioSciences, which was sold to Gilead Sciences in 2013 for $540 million. YM BioSciences commercialized bioscience technology in Cuba and made significant research breakthroughs in Myelofibrosis, a rare bone marrow cancer (See Momelotinib and Nimotuzumab). While in Cuba, Williams was recommended to seek the services of the International Center of Neurologic Restoration (CIREN), where doctors re-channeled the neuropathways with repetitive physiotherapy to overcome his partial paralysis. Williams returned to Cuba for one month every year for over ten years and was able to continue his career.

He co-founded InMedia Corporation, developing digital photography software for digital cameras. This company which became PNI Digital Media and sold to Staples Inc. for $74 million.

In 2001 Williams rescued Bingo.com from potential bankruptcy and became its president and CEO until 2011 and then its executive chairman. Effective December 31, 2014 Unibet Group Plc. purchased Bingo.com Ltd.'s www.bingo.com domain name and its online gambling business for $8 million. The company was renamed Shoal Games and was listed on the Toronto Venture Stock Exchange. In March 2019, Shoal Games purchased Kidoz, an Ad-Tech company resident in Tel Aviv, Israel for $20 million in shares and renamed Shoal Games Ltd. to Kidoz Inc. and continues to trade on the TSX Venture Exchange. Mr. Williams continues with the company as the executive chairman.

== Awards and memberships ==
Mr. Williams is a recipient of the British Columbia DigiBC Lifetime Achievement award for his contributions in pioneering the video game industry in Canada. In 1982, Mr. Williams’ company Sydney Development Corp. published "Evolution" the first multi-level computer game, which was created by two teenagers, Don Mattrick and Jeff Sembers as well as publishing several other video games, including other worldwide hits, Quest for Tires and Damn Busters thereby putting the Canadian video game industry on the map and earning him the title, the "Godfather" of BC's gaming industry. In his acceptance speech, Williams gave advice to all the ambitious entrepreneurs – "To be successful, keep at it and believe in yourself".

Mr. Williams was featured in Knights of the New Technology: The Inside Story of Canada's Computer Elite, authored by David Thomas and published by Key Porter Books 1983.
