= The Cycles: International Grand Prix Racing =

1989 video game

- Developer: Distinctive Software
- Publishers: Accolade; Ocean Software
- Producer: Pam Levins
- Designers: Brad Gour; Don Mattrick
- Artists: John Boechler; Michael Smith
- Composer: Krisjan Hatlelid
- Platforms: Amiga, Amstrad CPC, Commodore 64, Mac, MS-DOS, ZX Spectrum
- Release: 1989: Amiga, MS-DOS; 1990: Spectrum, CPC, Mac; 1991: C64
- Genre: Sim racing
- Mode: Single-player

The Cycles: International Grand Prix Racing is a motorcycle racing simulation video game developed by Distinctive Software. It was published by Accolade in 1989 for Amiga and MS-DOS, then later by Ocean Software. Ports were released for the Commodore 64, Amstrad CPC, ZX Spectrum, and Mac.

The game has similarities to Distinctive's Grand Prix Circuit, but for motorcycle racing. It includes all the tracks of 1989 Grand Prix motorcycle racing season.

== Gameplay ==
The player has no time limit to complete races. If the player crashes, they are out of the race. The player can change the number of laps for a race.

The game has three modes:

1. Championship: The player chooses a bike and can play races they qualify for.
2. Practice: The player chooses their bike and track.
3. Single Race: Player chooses a bike and track. If the player is qualified for race, they can proceed to it.

== Development ==
The Cycles: International Grand Prix Racing was developed by Distinctive Software, having previously made the Test Drive series.
