= Accolade's Comics =

1987 video game

- Developer: Distinctive Software
- Publisher: Accolade
- Designers: Jeff Sember; Don Mattrick
- Composer: Patrick Payne
- Platforms: Apple II, Commodore 64
- Release: 1987
- Genre: Adventure

Accolade's Comics (shown as Accolade Comics in the game) is an adventure game released in 1987 and published by Accolade. It was developed by the co-founders of the Canadian firm Distinctive Software, Don Mattrick and Jeff Sember. The game intersperses action games into the plot.

== Gameplay ==
The protagonist of the game is wisecracking secret agent Steve Keene. In the first scene, Keene is summoned to headquarters by his chief, who sends him on one of two missions.

Game play involves multiple adventures in two arenas: panels of a comic book page where dialogue and actions are selected for Steve that may or may not determine what will happen on the next panel (similar to the Choose Your Own Adventure book format); and traditional scrolling action boards where Steve is a moving character doing the physical task necessary (e.g. swimming, jumping, shooting) to advance through the stage.

Steve can lose a life inside the comic page portions as well as the motion portions. If this happens, the game "rewinds" a few panels, forcing the player to re-do these panels until the crisis point is reached again.

== Reception ==
In the June 1987 edition of Questbusters, Shay Addams admired the "dynamic artwork" with "sophisticated spot animation" that was "presented in an inventive manner". But he found the internal arcade mini-games were "way too slow to have any fun." He concluded by calling Comics "lightweight entertainment that you may want to check out just to see the innovative illustration scheme. But don't plan on completing it unless you love playing rather flimsy videogames.

In the June-July 1987 edition of Computer Gaming World, Jasper Sylvester admired the game's satirical tone and writing, but criticized the repetitive arcade sequences.

In the November 1987 edition of Compute!, Robert Bixby thought that Comics represented "the new wave in adventure software [...] brightly lit and humorous, and sophisticated enough to poke fun at itself and its genre." Sylvester noted that the graphics-intensive program required a "a lot of disk swapping", and that load times were slow. He criticized the program for forcing the player to re-do some of the storyline each time the character died. However, these issues were minor, and Bixby concluded "With features that will appeal to children and adults, videogame addicts, and adventure aficionados, Comics is a winner from beginning to end. Or as close to the end as I was able to get after several days of trying. I'm still trying."
