= Jaktinib =

Chemical compound

Legal status
- Legal status: Investigational

Identifiers
- IUPAC name: N-(cyanomethyl)-4-{2-[4-(3,3,5,5-tetradeuteriomorpholin-4-yl)anilino]pyrimidin-4-yl]}benzamide
- CAS Number: 1619927-66-0
- DrugBank: DB17545
- UNII: 5W59S33KC9

Chemical and physical data
- Formula: C_{23}H_{18}D_{4}N_{6}O_{2}
- Molar mass: 418.491 g·mol^{−1}
- 3D model (JSmol): Interactive image
- SMILES: [2H]C1([2H])COCC([2H])([2H])N1c1ccc(Nc2nccc(-c3ccc(C(=O)NCC#N)cc3)n2)cc1
- InChI: InChI=1S/C23H22N6O2/c24-10-12-25-22(30)18-3-1-17(2-4-18)21-9-11-26-23(28-21)27-19-5-7-20(8-6-19)29-13-15-31-16-14-29/h1-9,11H,12-16H2,(H,25,30)(H,26,27,28)/i13D2,14D2; Key:ZVHNDZWQTBEVRY-RYIWKTDQSA-N

Jaktinib (also known as gecaxitinib) is a Janus kinase inhibitor under development for myelofibrosis. It is a deuterated analog of momelotinib.
