= Sydney Development Corporation =

Canadian software company

- Industry: Enterprise Application Software (EAS) video games
- Founded: 1978
- Founder: Tarrnie Williams
- Defunct: 1989
- Headquarters: Vancouver, British Columbia, Canada
- Key people: Tarrnie Williams
- Revenue: Can$21 million In 1983
- Number of employees: ~100

Sydney Development Corporation (SDC) was the first publicly traded software company in Canada. Founded by Tarrnie Williams, SDC developed an online real-time project management system for the IBM System/370 mainframe computer, then various different business applications for microcomputers such as the Apple II, and eventually became the first developer and publisher of computer games for microcomputers in Canada.

In 1981, SDC agreed to publish Evolution by Don Mattrick and Jeff Sembers, after Williams's 10-year-old son enjoyed a demo of the game. Evolution sold over 400,000 copies, and Mattrick and Sembers went on to found Distinctive Software.

Sydney Development Corp. was the fastest-growing public company in Canada in the five-year period 1978 to 1983 with fiscal year 1983 revenues of Can$21 million (equivalent to $59 million in 2025).

The company filed for bankruptcy on 23 May 1989.
