= Kidoz =

Canadian advertising technology company

Kidoz Inc.
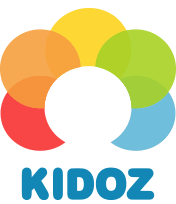
- Type: Public
- Traded as: TSX-V: KDOZ; OTCQB: KDOZF
- ISIN: CA4939471054
- Industry: Mobile technology
- Headquarters: Vancouver, British Columbia, Canada
- Area served: Worldwide
- Key people: T. M. Williams (Chairman); Jason Williams (CEO); Eldad Ben Tora (President); Henry Bromley (CFO); T. H. Williams (EVP, Product & Technology); Ryan Lexer (VP of Strategy); Stacey McDowall (Head of Brand & Marketing); Fiona Curtis (Independent Director); Claes Kalborg (Independent Director); Moshe David (Independent Director)
- Revenue: ▲US$14,004,527 (2024)
- Operating income: ▲US$599,778 (2024)
- Net income: ▲US$353,140 (2024)
- Total assets: ▼US$11,734,233 (2024)
- Total equity: ▲US$7,926,689 (2024)
- Number of employees: 42 (2024)
- Subsidiaries: Prado
- Website: kidoz.net

Kidoz (TSX-V: KDOZ, OTCQB: KDOZF) is a Canadian technology company that operates an adtech platform specializing in mobile gamer engagement and privacy-compliant mobile advertising infrastructure. Built upon a sophisticated machine learning technology that adheres to the COPPA standard (Children's Online Privacy Protection Act), the platform analyzes the in-app ecosystem to target relevant content based on user behavior. Following a strategic realignment in 2023, Kidoz expanded its strategy beyond its market-leading focus on children to capture the broader mobile gaming audience, including teens and adults, reaching hundreds of millions of people daily.

== Technology ==
The technical foundation of Kidoz is built upon three core pillars: direct software development kit (SDK) integrations providing access to mobile gaming inventory, the proprietary Kite IQ AI contextual intelligence engine capable of advanced targeting and optimizations, and a modern end-to-end advertising technology infrastructure.

=== Core Technology ===
- SDK Integrations: The company maintains and owns a leading SDK widely adopted in the app ecosystem and is the primary channel for in-app advertising delivery. This provides Kidoz with a premium base of advertising inventory for brand partners. The SDK is considered essential infrastructure for ensuring safe, effective advertising experiences and expanding the company's distribution footprint. Kidoz reaches millions of users through thousands of direct SDK integrations.
- Kite IQ: A proprietary AI contextual intelligence system developed by the company. It performs automated analysis, classification, and compliance review of mobile applications, as well as contextual ad targeting. The technology is designed to enhance advertising effectiveness without the use of personal or individually identifiable data. Advertising campaigns utilizing Kite IQ have been reported by the company to achieve strong engagement metrics and a positive return on advertising spend (ROAS). Kidoz has stated that it continues to allocate resources toward the development of Kite IQ to enhance contextual analysis capabilities and overall campaign performance.
- Modern AdTech Infrastructure: The company's advertising technology framework combines its direct integration SDK with the Kite IQ system to manage ad delivery, contextual targeting, and compliance. This dual structure provides operational control and supports brand-safe advertising within mobile in-app environments across the company's network.

Together, these technologies form the core of Kidoz's advertising platform, enabling privacy-compliant, contextually targeted campaigns across a large network of mobile gaming applications. This integrated system underpins the company's operational model and supports its role in delivering safe and effective digital advertising experiences globally.

=== Original Features ===
Kidoz initially offered a stand-alone Child Mode application for mobile devices, providing a controlled environment for children to safely navigate the World Wide Web. This consumer product included a password-protected Parental Control Account, which allowed parents/guardians to manage security settings, customize available content, and begin to empower their children to explore their interests independently and safely.

For business integration, Kidoz supplied a SDK and JavaScript modules, enabling developers and publishers to implement child-safe monetization through proprietary content recommendation widgets. It has been disclosed that future Freemium versions will include additional features, and that there will be a Premium model, offering certain specialized features at a small monthly fee. The platform enforced content safety by moderating and approving all user-generated submissions. Furthermore, it utilized a "Smart Content Engine" designed to filter and individualize content based on demographic variables, including age, gender, and language. Version 1.0 of the Kidoz system was officially launched and supported 30 languages in May 2009: English, German, Chinese Traditional, Chinese Simplified, French, Greek, Italian, Japanese, Korean, Portuguese, Russian, Spanish, Czech, Dutch, Swedish, Turkish, Polish.

== Background ==
The Kidoz Kid's Web Environment Operating System was developed by Kidoz Ltd, an Israeli start-up based in Tel Aviv. The CEO was Gai Havkin.

== Business Model ==
Kidoz currently follows the Freemium model as the application is available as a free download from the website. Future versions will include additional features, such as e-mail and instant messaging in a closed network. It has been revealed that in the next few months, KIDO’Z will launch its Premium Package that will offer additional tools, services and content.

Kidoz operates an AdTech Platform-as-a-Service (PaaS) model. The platform is structured with multiple, integrated service tiers, which are utilized to secure recurring revenue streams, typically through direct brand partnerships. Services offered through the platform include premium SDK integration and network delivery solutions enhanced by artificial intelligence.

== Market Expansion ==
In a strategic realignment for market expansion, Kidoz focused its efforts on growth in the mobile gaming industry and the accelerating shift toward privacy-compliant advertising solutions. This strategy was executed to capitalize on three market factors: the scale of the global mobile gaming market, regulatory developments favoring privacy-compliant platforms, and the general industry trend of comprehensive technology platforms.
