= Madden NFL '94 =

1993 video game

- North American SNES box art
- Developers: High Score Productions (Genesis); Visual Concepts (SNES)
- Publishers: WW: EA Sports; JP: Electronic Arts Victor
- Composer: Brian L. Schmidt
- Series: Madden NFL
- Platforms: Genesis/Mega Drive, Super NES
- Release: Genesis/Mega Drive: NA: November 19, 1993; PAL: November 1993; JP: February 18, 1994; Super NES: NA: November 19, 1993; JP: December 24, 1993; PAL: 1994
- Genre: Sports (American football)
- Modes: Single player, Multiplayer

Madden NFL '94, released as NFL Pro Football '94 in Japan, is a 1993 American football video game released by EA Sports for the Sega Genesis and Super NES. It is the fourth game in the Madden NFL series, and marked a significant step forward in the franchise, known for bringing realistic football gameplay to home consoles and laying the groundwork for modern football video games. As the first game in the Madden series with an official NFL team license, the introduction of official NFL teams and improved gameplay mechanics made it a standout title in the series and a nostalgic favorite for fans of retro sports games.

== Gameplay ==
It is the first Madden game to use the "EA Sports – It's in the Game" audio tag. It also introduces the "Flip play", "Play-call mode", "Pass-catch mode" and "Bluff play" options to the series. This is the first Madden title to pause the action and rotate the screen during punts, kickoffs, and turnovers, rather than instantly reversing P.O.V. to the opposite side of the field, which could be disorienting to players. The field can also be rotated to view plays from any angle in instant replay.

This is also the first Madden game to have Super Bowl teams available for play without any special codes.

Certain versions of the game are labeled as "Limited First Round Editions".

== Development ==
The success of John Madden Football ‘93 inspired game developers at Electronic Arts to produce an improved football video game that would transform the Madden franchise into something that emulated the reality of American football. Released in the midst of the video game arms race between Sega and Nintendo, Madden NFL ‘94 was developed by High Score Productions for the Sega Genesis and Visual Concepts for the Super NES. The Sega Genesis, created as a home console for teenage boys, had tremendous success in sports simulations after its first release of John Madden Football in 1990. Madden on the Genesis stood out to users for its speed and easy gameplay. When Electronic Arts eventually introduced Madden to the SNES, it did not gain as much popularity as its Sega counterpart. Released a year after (in 1991) the Genesis, the Super NES version of John Madden Football ran slower and less smooth. As a result, EA expanded its multiplatform strategy by bringing in a studio to specifically work on the Super NES port in 1993. Visual Concepts combated the notion that the Super NES was inferior for football games by delivering a smooth port that matched the speed of the Genesis version while enhancing it with scaling effects and a pseudo-3D field for added visual polish.

The team behind the making of Madden was large and incorporated someone for every aspect of the game. Several of the personnel from the original John Madden Football, such as John Madden, Jim Simmons, and Scott Orr, contributed their expertise and creativity to Madden NFL ‘94. Most notably, the team behind Madden NFL '94 secured an official NFL license, enabling the game to feature authentic NFL teams logos and uniforms from the 1993-1994 season. This edition was not equipped with a National Football League Players Association licence, limiting players to being identified by solely their number. The Madden series did not obtain a license with the NFL Players Association—only for the Genesis—until the development of Madden NFL '95.

== Reception ==
Reception

Review scores
Publication	Score
Mega	95%
IGN	73%

The game was a bestseller in the US, and made number 15 in the UK. IGN rated the game 75th on their "Top 100 SNES Games of All Time." They also wrote that instead of playing generic players and teams like its predecessors, the developers had use of the NFL license that players can play official players and teams with enhanced gameplay. They concluded their review opining Madden NFL 94 is: "Arguably the best Madden released in the 16-bit era, and maybe the most retro-nostalgic installment in the entire series."
