= Towson Tigers men's basketball =

2025–26 Towson Tigers men's basketball team
- University: Towson University
- Head coach: Pat Skerry (15th season)
- Location: Towson, Maryland
- Arena: SECU Arena (capacity: 5,200)
- Conference: Coastal Athletic Association
- Nickname: Tigers
- Colors: Black and gold

NCAA Division I tournament Elite Eight
- 1977*
Other NCAA Division I tournament results
Sweet Sixteen	1977*, 1978*
Appearances	1977*, 1978*, 1990, 1991

Conference tournament champions
- East Coast: 1990, 1991, 1992

Conference regular-season champions
- 1977, 1978, 1990, 1991, 1993, 1994, 2022, 2025

Uniforms
Home	Away	Alternate
- * at Division II level

The Towson Tigers men's basketball team represents Towson University in Towson, Maryland in NCAA Division I competition. The school's team currently competes in the Coastal Athletic Association and play their home games at SECU Arena. The Tigers have appeared two times in the NCAA Division I men's basketball tournament, most recently in 1991.

== History ==
=== Conference affiliations ===
- 1959–60 to 1978–79: Mason–Dixon Conference (Division II)
- 1979–80 to 1981–82: ECAC Metro South Conference
- 1982–83 to 1991–92: East Coast Conference
- 1992–93 to 1994–95: Big South Conference
- 1995–96 to 2000–01: America East Conference
- 2001–02 to Present: Coastal Athletic Association
  - 2001–02 to 2022–23: Colonial Athletic Association
  - 2023–24 to Present: Coastal Athletic Association

== Season-by-season results ==
Statistics overview
Season	Coach	Overall	Conference	Standing	Postseason
Earl Killian (Mason-Dixon (Division II)) (1959–1962)
1959-60	Earl Killian	3-17	1-15	10th	-
1960-61	Earl Killian	3-12	1-10	10th	-
1961-62	Earl Killian	1-15	0-12	10th	-
1962-63	Earl Killian	1-15	0-13	10th	-
Ross Sachs (Mason-Dixon (Division II)) (1963–1965)
1963-64	Ross Sachs	1-15	0-14	10th	-
1964-65	Ross Sachs	8-7	4-7	6th	-
1965-66	Ross Sachs	4-13	3-9	7th	-
Vince Angotti (Mason-Dixon (Division II)) (1966–1977)
1966-67	Vince Angotti	9-9	6-5	4th	-
1967-68	Vince Angotti	11-8	7-6	5th	-
1968-69	Vince Angotti	14-8	7-4	4th	-
1969-70	Vince Angotti	16-9	5-8	6th	-
1970-71	Vince Angotti	8-16	6-7	6th	-
1971-72	Vince Angotti	15-10	5-4	4th	-
1972-73	Vince Angotti	17-10	6-6	4th	-
1973-74	Vince Angotti	15-11	4-7	7th	-
1974-75	Vince Angotti	14-11	7-7	5th	-
1975-76	Vince Angotti	19-10	8-6	4th	-
1976-77	Vince Angotti	27-3	10-0	1st	NCAA DII Elite Eight
1977-78	Vince Angotti	26-4	10-0	1st	NCAA DII Regionals
Mike Radabaugh (Mason-Dixon (Division II)) (1978–1979)
1978-79	Mike Radabaugh	5-21	-	-	-
Vince Angotti (ECAC Metro South Conference) (1979–1981)
1979-80	Vince Angotti	10-16	-	-	-
1980-81	Vince Angotti	13-14	-	-	-
1981-82	Vince Angotti	10-17	-	-	-
Vince Angotti (East Coast Conference) (1982–1983)
1982-83	Vince Angotti	7-21	2-7	5th	-
Terry Truax (East Coast Conference) (1983–1991)
1983-84	Terry Truax	10-19	5-11	7th	-
1984-85	Terry Truax	7-21	5-9	7th	-
1985-86	Terry Truax	8-20	5-9	6th	-
1986-87	Terry Truax	14-16	5-9	6th	-
1987-88	Terry Truax	14-16	4-10	7th	-
1988-89	Terry Truax	19-10	10-4		-
1989-90	Terry Truax	18-13	8-6	1st	NCAA round of 64
1990-91	Terry Truax	19-11	10-2	1st	NCAA round of 64
1991-92	Terry Truax	17-13	9-3	2nd	-
Terry Truax (Big South Conference) (1992–1994)
1992-93	Terry Truax	18-9	14-2	1st	-
1993-94	Terry Truax	21-9	15-3	1st	-
1994-95	Terry Truax	12-15	6-10	7th	-
Terry Truax (America East Conference) (1995–1997)
1995-96	Terry Truax	16-12	11-7	3rd	-
1996-97	Terry Truax	9-19	5-13	9th	-
Mike Jaskulski (America East) (1997–2000)
1997-98	Mike Jaskulski	8-20	4-14	9th	-
1998-99	Mike Jaskulski	6-22	4-14	9th	-
1999-00	Mike Jaskulski	11-17	7-11	6th	-
2000-01	Mike Jaskulski	12-17	7-11	8th	-
Michael Hunt (Colonial Athletic Association) (2001–2003)
2001-02	Michael Hunt	11-18	7-11	6th	-
2002-03	Michael Hunt	4-24	1-17	10th	-
2003-04	Michael Hunt	8-21	4-14	8th	-
Pat Kennedy (Colonial Athletic Association) (2004–2010)
2004-05	Pat Kennedy	6-23	2-16	9th	-
2005-06	Pat Kennedy	12-16	8-10	7th	-
2006-07	Pat Kennedy	15-17	8-10	7th	-
2007-08	Pat Kennedy	13-18	7-11	9th	-
2008-09	Pat Kennedy	12-22	5-13	10th	-
2009-10	Pat Kennedy	10-21	6-12	8th	-
2010-11	Pat Kennedy	4-26	0-18	12th	-
Pat Skerry (Colonial/Coastal Athletic Association) (2011–present)
2011-12	Pat Skerry	1-31	1-17	12th	-
2012-13	Pat Skerry	18-13	13-5	2nd	-
2013-14	Pat Skerry	25-11	13-3	2nd	CIT Quarterfinals
2014-15	Pat Skerry	12-20	5-13	9th	-
2015-16	Pat Skerry	20-13	11-7	T-3rd	Vegas 16 Quarterfinals
2016-17	Pat Skerry	20-13	11-7	3rd	-
2017-18	Pat Skerry	18-14	8-10	5th	-
2018-19	Pat Skerry	10-22	6-12	9th	-
2019-20	Pat Skerry	19-13	12-6	3rd	-
2020-21	Pat Skerry	4-14	3-9	9th	-
2021-22	Pat Skerry	25-9	15-3	T-1st	NIT First Round
2022-23	Pat Skerry	21-12	12-6	3rd	-
2023-24	Pat Skerry	22-10	16-2	1st	-
Total:		796-973			
National champion Postseason invitational champion Conference regular season champion Conference regular season and conference tournament champion Division regular season champion Division regular season and conference tournament champion Conference tournament champion

== Postseason results ==
=== NCAA Division I Tournament results ===
The Tigers have appeared in the NCAA Division I tournament two times. Their combined record is 0–2.

Year	Round	Opponent	Result
1990	First round	Oklahoma	L 68–77
1991	First round	Ohio State	L 86–97

=== NIT results ===
The Tigers have appeared in one National Invitation Tournament (NIT). Their record is 0–1.

Year	Round	Opponent	Result
2022	First round	Wake Forest	L 64–74

=== Vegas 16 results ===
The Tigers have appeared in one Vegas 16. Their record is 0–1.

Year	Round	Opponent	Result
2016	Quarterfinals	Oakland	L 72–90

=== CIT results ===
The Tigers have appeared in one CollegeInsider.com Postseason Tournament (CIT). Their record is 2–1.

Year	Round	Opponent	Result
2014	First round Second Round; Quarterfinals	USC Upstate; East Tennessee State; Murray State	W 63–60; W 83–77; L 73–85

=== NCAA Division II Tournament results ===
The Tigers appeared in the NCAA Division II Tournament two times. Their combined record is 3–2.

Year	Round	Opponent	Result
1977	Regional semifinals Regional Finals; Elite Eight	Winston-Salem State; Baltimore; Sacred Heart	W 102–83; W 92–87 ^{OT} L 82–85
1978	Regional semifinals Regional Finals	Albany State; Elizabeth City State	W 106–89; L 73–84

== Notable players ==
- Justin Gorham (born 1998), basketball player in the Israeli Basketball Premier League
- Ryan Lexer (born 1976), American-Israeli basketball player
