= Mattel Auto Race =

First fully digital handheld video game

Mattel Electronics Auto Race
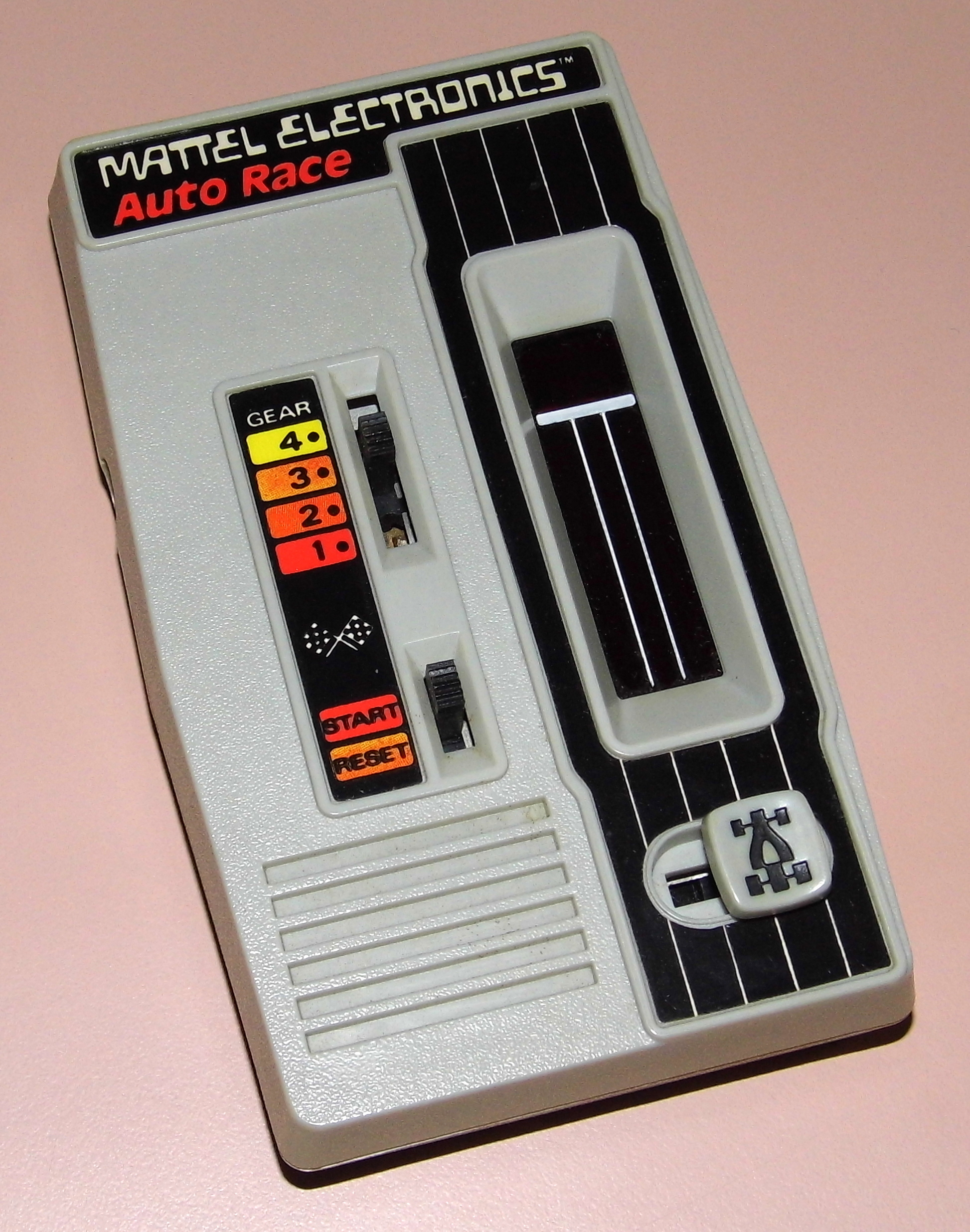
- Developers: Mattel; Rockwell International
- Publisher: Mattel Electronics
- Designer: George J. Klose
- Programmer: Mark Lesser
- Platform: Handheld
- Release: 1976
- Genre: Racing
- Mode: Single-player

Mattel Electronics Auto Race was released in 1976 by Mattel Electronics as the first handheld electronic game to use only solid-state electronics; it has no mechanical elements except the controls and on/off switch. Using hardware designed for calculators and powered by a nine-volt battery, the cars are represented by red LEDs on a playfield which covers only a small portion of the case. The audio consists of beeps. George J. Klose based the game on 1970s racing arcade video games and designed the hardware, with some hardware features added by Mark Lesser who also wrote the 512 bytes of program code.

From a top-down perspective, the player controls a car on a three-lane track and moves between them with a switch. Opponent vehicles move toward the player, in an effect similar to vertical scrolling, and the player must avoid them. A second control shifts gears from 1–4, with the speed increasing for each.

Auto Race was followed by other successful handheld sports games from Mattel, including Football and Baseball which were both programmed by Lesser. The Auto Race design was tweaked into multiple other handhelds, including Missile Attack (1976), which became Battlestar Galactica Space Alert (1978) as a tie-in with the Battlestar Galactica TV series, and Ski Slalom (1980). Auto Race was cloned in the Soviet Union as Elektronika IER-01.

== Gameplay ==
The player's car is represented by a bright blip (a vertical dash sign) on the bottom of the screen. The player must make it to the top of the screen 4 times (4 laps) to win, but, while making it towards the top, the player must swerve past other cars using the switch at the bottom of the system to toggle among three lanes. If hit by a car, the player's vehicle keeps moving back towards the bottom of the screen until it gets out of the other car's way. The goal is to beat the game with the shortest time possible before the 99 seconds given (as high as the two-digit timer can show) are up. The player's car has four gears and the higher the gear, the faster the other cars come at it.

The manual assigns ratings to completion times:

Time in seconds	Rating
Under 30	World Champion Driver
30-45	Professional Driver
45-55	Showing Potential
55-65	Still an Amateur
65-75	Stick To The Highways
75 or more	Leave Car In Garage

== Development ==
George J. Klose, a product development engineer at Mattel, came up with the concept of repurposing standard calculator hardware to create a handheld electronic game using individual display segments as blips that would move on the display. He designed the gameplay for Mattel Auto Race, inspired by auto racing games found in video arcades in the 1970s. He built a proof of concept with a blip moving on an LED display without using a microprocessor to get approval from Mattel for further development. He then looked for a manufacturer to provide a circuit board that would fit into a compact package. Klose and his manager Richard Cheng approached the Microelectronics Division of Rockwell International, a leader in designing handheld calculator chips, to supply Mattel with the hardware and provide technical support.

Mark Lesser, a circuit design engineer at Rockwell International, modified the B5000 calculator chip, adding a display driver multiplexing scheme to the hardware and a custom sound driver for a piezo-ceramic speaker, resulting in the B6000 chip used in Auto Race. Sound is produced by toggling the speaker in embedded timing loops from within the program itself. Without prior programming experience, Lesser wrote the game in assembly language for the 512 bytes of ROM. He spent eighteen months getting the code to fit.

== Reception ==
Sales of Mattel Auto Race exceeded expectations. Mattel in the 1970s, known mostly for Barbie dolls and Hot Wheels, was at first skeptical of products based on electronics, especially at what was considered an expensive retail price at the time: US$24.99 (equivalent to $140 in 2025). The success of Auto Race convinced Mattel to proceed with the development of Mattel Football which was often sold out and in short supply, and this led to the creation of a new Mattel Electronics Division in 1978, which for a time was extremely profitable.

== Legacy ==
Mattel pioneered the category of handheld electronic video games when it released Auto Race in 1976. It was the first in a line of sports handhelds including Football, Baseball, Basketball, Soccer, and Hockey, as well as non-sports games.

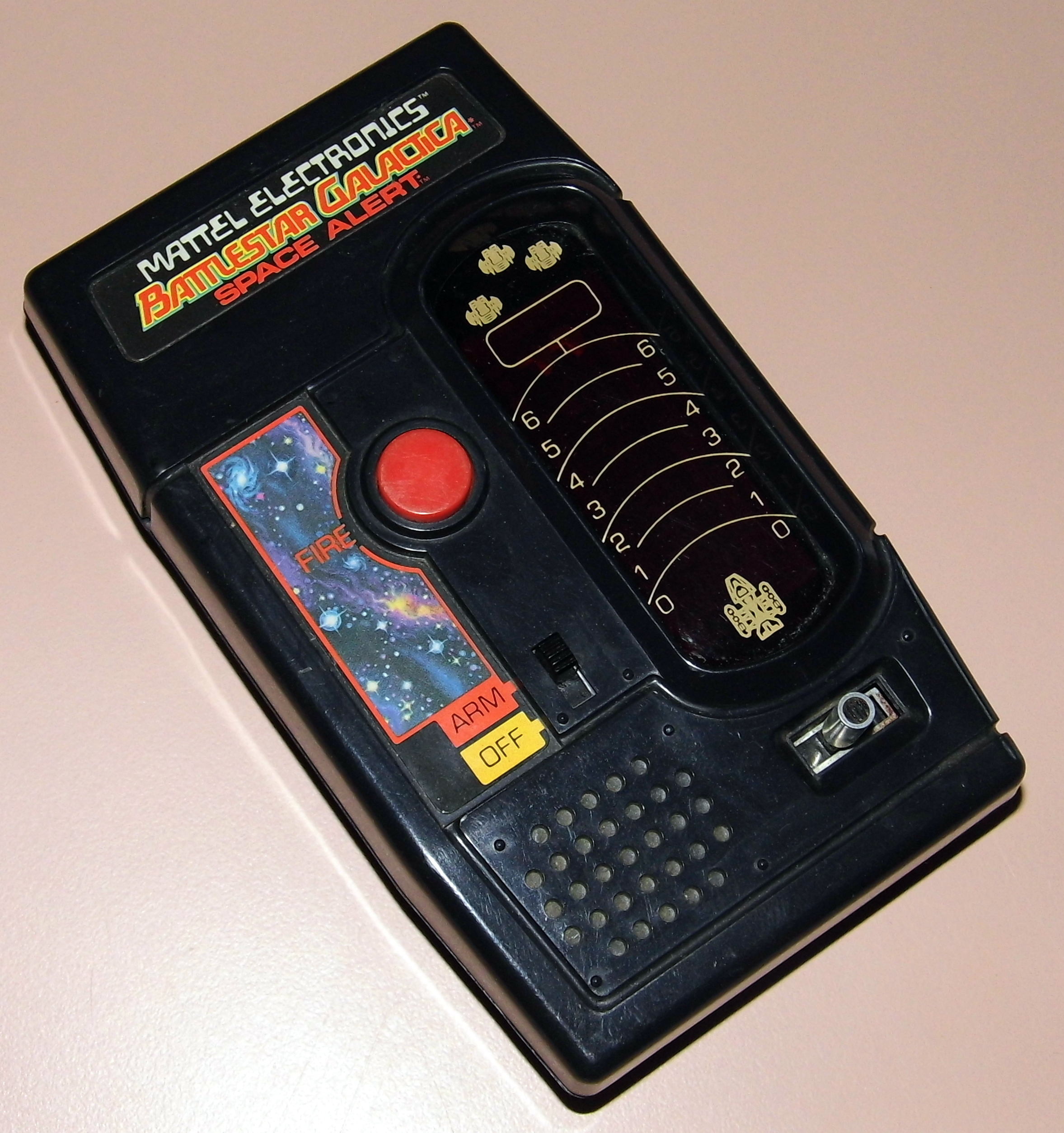
In Battlestar Galactica Space Alert, the gear switch of Auto Race is replaced with a red fire button.

Auto Race was reworked into Missile Attack, also released in 1976. NBC refused to air the Missile Attack commercial because of the dark theme of the game, and Mattel removed it from the market. It was reintroduced in 1978 based on the Battlestar Galactica TV series as Battlestar Galactica Space Alert. The player remains at the bottom of the playfield, and a fire button is used to shoot and destroy adversaries. If one reaches the center-bottom space on the playing field, the Galactica is considered destroyed and the game over. The 1980 Flash Gordon handheld is the same game with a different science fiction license, but was not released.

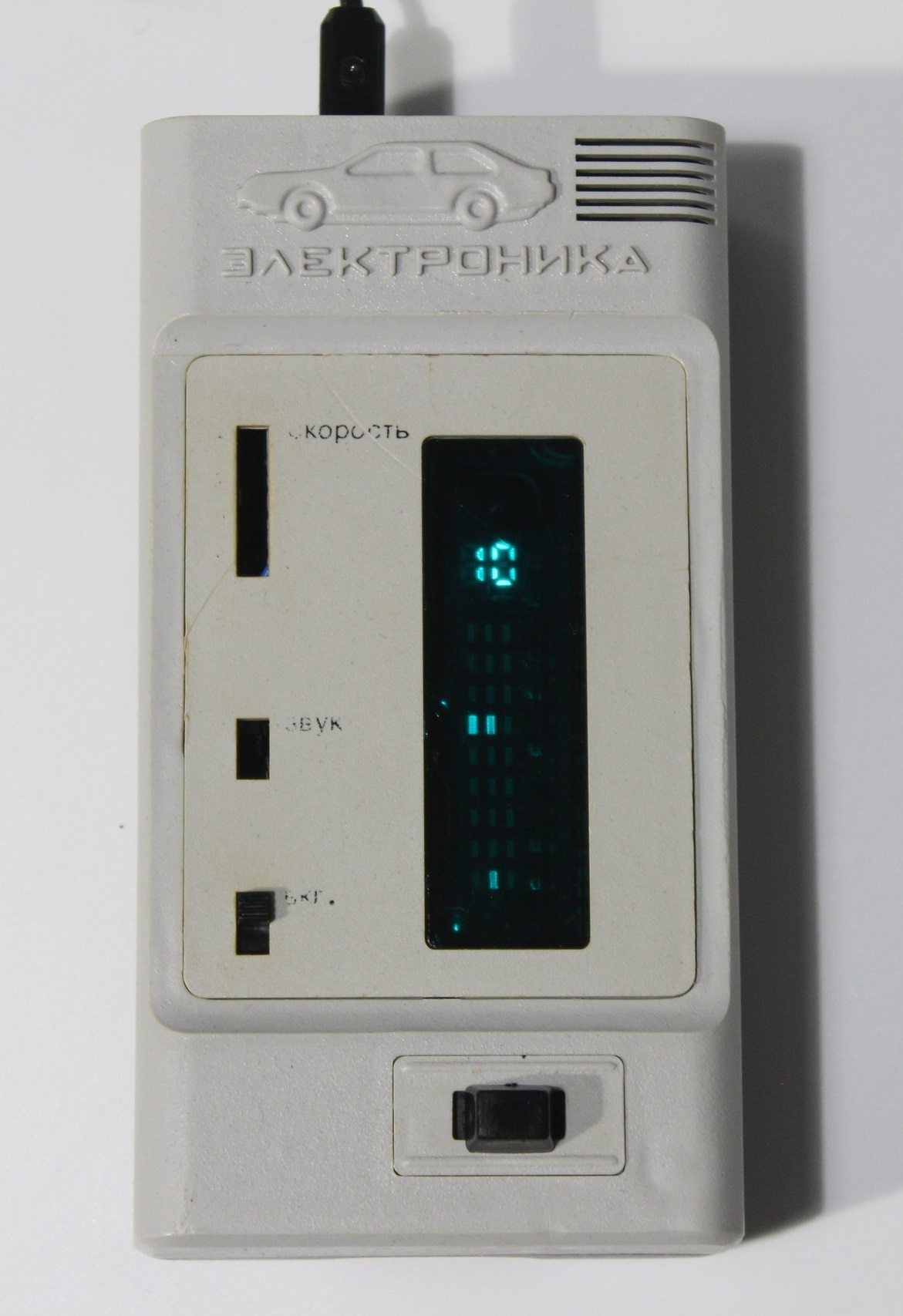
Elektronika IER-01, a Soviet-made clone of Auto Race

In 1980, a reskinned Auto Race was released as Mattel Ski Slalom outside the US. The four gears are labeled SLALOM, BRONZE, SILVER, and GOLD.

In 1983, a clone of Auto Race developed by the Ministry of Electronic Industry of the Soviet Union was released as Elektronika IER-01.
