= Mission: Impossible (1991 video game) =

1991 adventure video game

- Developer: Distinctive Software
- Publisher: Konami
- Platform: DOS
- Release: 1991

Mission: Impossible is a 1991 adventure video game developed by Distinctive Software and published by Konami.

== Gameplay ==
Mission: Impossible is a game in which the player assembles a team of four agents with different skills and abilities.

== Reception ==
Charles Ardai reviewed the game for Computer Gaming World, and wrote that: "A player looking for a good thriller or espionage game would do better to get Countdown or Covert Action instead. A player looking for a good Mission: Impossible adventure is directed, with regret, to the late-night listings of the current TV Guide."
