= Nancy Bea Hefley =

American stadium organist (1936–2025)

Nancy Bea Hefley (née Keulen; February 24, 1936 – March 29, 2025) was an American stadium organist for 28 years for Major League Baseball's Los Angeles Dodgers.

== Biography ==
=== Early life ===
Nancy Bea Keulen grew up in the Los Angeles area, and began playing the piano at age 4 by listening to her seventeen-year-old sister, and by the age of seven, she was also proficient at playing the accordion. At the age of thirteen, she talked her piano teacher into teaching her the basics of the organ. She played the organ at Bellflower Baptist Church for over 55 years; it was there that she met her husband, Bill. She also played the organ at the Orange County Fair and played shows in Las Vegas and Lake Tahoe. She graduated from Whittier College.

=== Los Angeles Dodgers organist ===
In the mid-1980s, Hefley filled in for a friend as the organist for the California Angels games at Angel Stadium and was offered a job which she declined, not wishing to take work from a friend. When it was announced in 1987 that long-time Dodger organist Helen Dell was to retire at the end of the season after fifteen years, Hefley auditioned at an exhibition game between the Dodgers and the USC Trojans on February 14, 1988. She did not plan her programs, getting her cues from the events occurring on the field during the game and including a variety of popular pop and rock songs alongside older and less commonly played numbers.

== Family ==
She married Bill Hefley in 1956; they had a son, Mark.

== Retirement and death ==
On October 2, 2015, Hefley announced her retirement following the 2015 season and was replaced by Los Angeles Kings organist Dieter Ruehle.

Hefley died on March 29, 2025, at the age of 89.
