= Mario Andretti's Racing Challenge =

1991 video game

- Developer: Distinctive Software
- Publisher: Electronic Arts
- Platform: MS-DOS
- Release: NA: 1991
- Genre: Racing
- Mode: Single-player

Mario Andretti's Racing Challenge is a racing video game for MS-DOS developed by Distinctive Software and published in 1991 by Electronic Arts. It is modeled after Mario Andretti's career. The objective is to earn enough money by winning races to enter and win the indy car series.

== Gameplay ==
The game is a 3D racing game from the 1st perspective. Replays can be viewed from the 3rd person perspective. The player starts with $20.000 and has to earn money by winning races to enter the higher series. The available series are Sprint Cars, Modified, Stock Cars, Prototypes, Formula 1 and Indy Cars. The games contains one car per series and twelve race tracks are included:

- Indianapolis Fairgrounds
- Ascot Park
- Nazareth Speedway
- Michigan
- Daytona
- Pocono
- Laguna Seca
- Monte Carlo
- Silverstone
- Detroit
- Hockenheim
- LeMans

== Reception ==
Compute! stated in 1992 that Mario Andretti's Racing Challenge "falls short of the ultimate racing simulation, but it does take us several laps in the right direction."Computer Gaming World noted in 1991 that "it is the first time aficionados have been able to 'feel' the difference in six different types of racing." PC Format gave a 65% rating.
