= Ryan Lexer =

American former basketball player

Ryan Lexer ראין לקסר
Personal information
- Born: March 15, 1976 (age 50)
- Listed height: 6 ft 9 in (2.06 m)

Career information
- High school: Council Rock North (Newtown, Pennsylvania)
- College: Towson (1994–1998)
- NBA draft: 1998: undrafted
- Position: Power forward / center

Ryan Lexer (Hebrew: ראין לקסר; born March 15, 1976) is an American former basketball player. He played the power forward and center positions. He played in the Israeli Basketball Premier League in 1998 to 2008.

== Biography ==
Lexer is from Philadelphia, Pennsylvania, where he attended Council Rock High School North, and is Jewish. He is 6 ft 9 in (206 cm) tall.

He attended Towson University ('97), and played for the Towson Tigers from 1994 to 1998. In 1996-97 Lexer was 10th in the America East Conference in free throw percentage, at .743.

Lexer played basketball for Team USA in the 1997 Maccabiah Games.

He played in the Israeli Basketball Premier League in 1998 to 2008, for Hapoel Holon, Hapoel Jerusalem, Maccabi Hadera, Maccabi Haifa, and Maccabi Petach Tikvah.

Lexer, who was Head of Sales and Business Development at Kidoz until at least 2020, has served as the VP of Strategy since October 2022.
