= Mark Lesser =

American video game programmer and electronic engineer

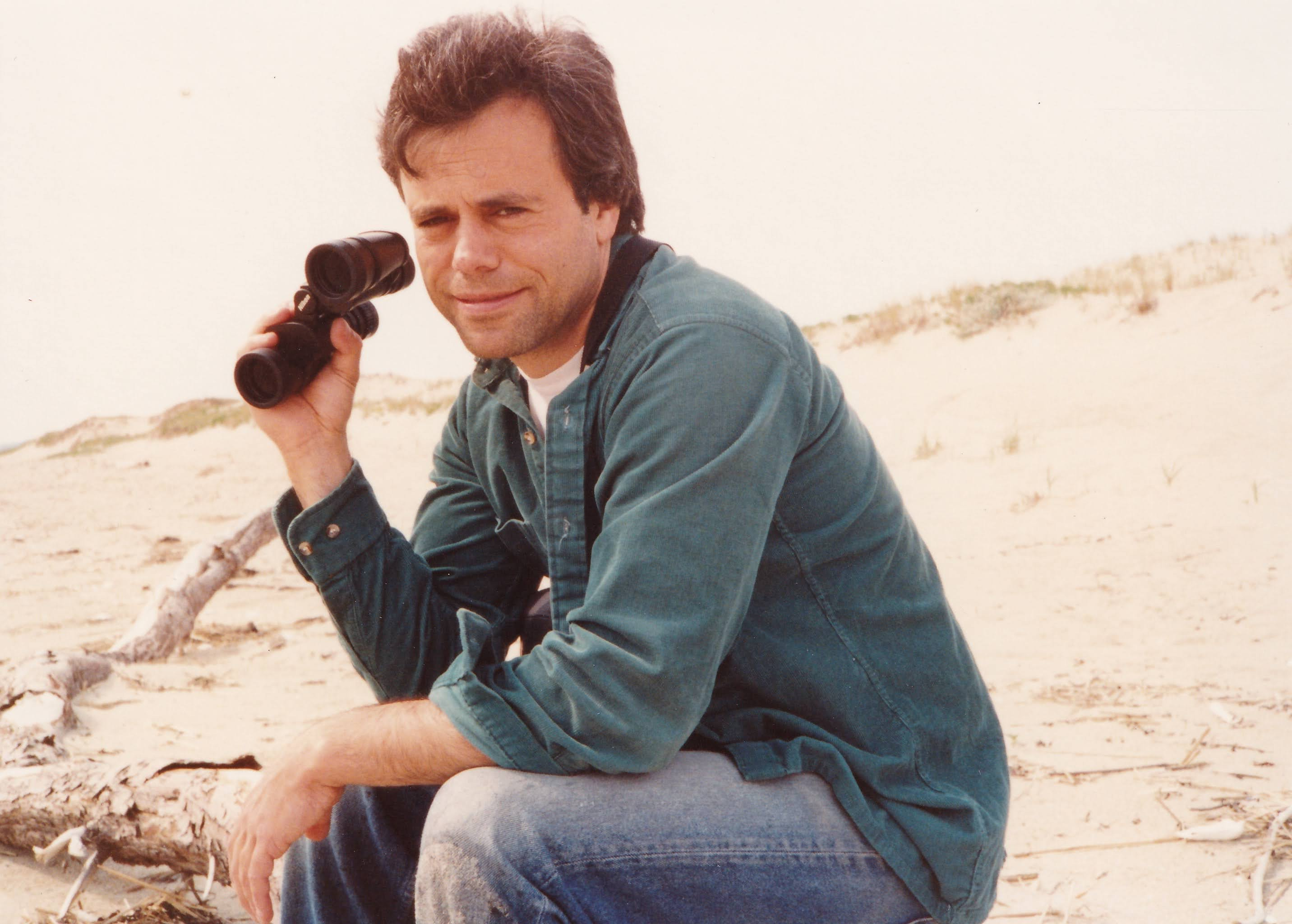
- Lesser, on Plum Island, MA, 1989
- Occupations: Video game programmer Electronic engineer

Mark B. Lesser is an American video game programmer and electronic engineer, best known for programming the first handheld games from Mattel Electronics. He also developed several installments of the NHL video game series.

Lesser graduated from MIT with a B.S. in electrical engineering. He joined the Microelectronics Division of Rockwell International in 1972 as a Circuit Designer. Lesser primarily worked on transistor chips for handheld calculators. Around this time, George Klose, a product development engineer at Mattel Electronics, had the idea to convert handheld calculators into digital games; Rockwell took on the proposal, and Lesser was assigned to the new project for Mattel. Lesser designed the program directly into the hardware, using punch cards in a minicomputer to write the game. Eventually, a 512-byte chip held all the game’s logic, display, and scoring. This “obstacle avoidance” handheld electronic game became Auto Race (1976)—the first handheld game with solid-state electronics. Lesser ultimately programmed the first three titles of the Mattel handhelds line, following up the success of Auto Race with Football (1977), and Baseball (1978). These games proved to be so popular that they spawned several imitators, including a line of electronic games by Coleco. In four years at Rockwell, Lesser created seven handheld games.

Around 1980, Lesser was hired at Parker Brothers, where he programmed Frogger II: Threeedeep! (1984) for the Atari 2600 and developed several (never-released) games. He later moved on from Parker Brothers to work at Microsmiths, then founded his own company, MBL Research, Inc. In 1991, Lesser subcontracted with Blue Sky Productions on the Sega Genesis version of John Madden Football ’93 (1992). Electronic Arts, pleased by Lesser’s good work, later offered him the contract to develop NHL ’94. (Lesser later confessed, “I’d never watched a hockey game, I didn’t know anything about it.”) He continued working on the NHL series through NHL ’99. Lesser’s final game was published in 1999 by EA Sports: a supercross motorcycle simulation game called Supercross 2000. Since 2000, Lesser has been retired from game programming.
