= NHL '94 =

1993 video game

- North American Genesis box art
- Developers: High Score Productions (Genesis, Sega CD); EA Canada (SNES); Park Place Productions (MS-DOS); Empty Clip Studios (Rewind)
- Publishers: EA Sports; Electronic Arts Victor (Japan)
- Designer: Jim Simmons
- Programmer: Mark B. Lesser
- Composer: Rob Hubbard
- Series: NHL
- Platforms: Genesis, Super NES, Sega CD, MS-DOS; Rewind; PlayStation 4, Xbox One
- Release: September 1993: Genesis; NA: September 1993; EU: October 1993 Super NES; NA: November 1993; EU: March 31, 1994; JP: April 8, 1994 Sega CD; NA: January 1994; EU: March 1994 Rewind; WW: October 30, 2020
- Genre: Sports (ice hockey)
- Modes: Single-player, multiplayer

NHL '94 is an ice hockey game by EA Sports released for the Genesis, Super NES. and MS-DOS in 1993, then the Sega CD in 1994. The MS-DOS version is titled NHL Hockey, without the "'94" in the title. It is the third game in the NHL series and the first in the series to be officially licensed by both the National Hockey League (NHL) and the NHL Players' Association (NHLPA). NHL '94 launched to critical acclaim. It is often considered among the greatest sports video games and is widely considered the greatest hockey game of all time.

== Gameplay ==
NHL Hockey (DOS) gameplay

The game maintained the series' signature vertical camera angle, which offered the player distinct gameplay and strategic advantages over contemporary side-view hockey games, and kept the 2D sprite character models of NHLPA '93 (albeit with some new animations). The team rosters and player attributes in the game reflect that of the 1992-93 season, and include the league's two new expansion teams for that season, the Mighty Ducks of Anaheim (now the Anaheim Ducks) and Florida Panthers.

Many improvements were made to the engine by EA between 1992 and 1993. Notably, NHL '94 introduced the "one timer", an authentic hockey move where a player shoots the puck directly off of a pass. However, other scoring techniques such as 'the duper' and 'the move' remain quite popular and effective scoring tactics, not to mention the occasionally used b-button shot (wrist shot) and the somewhat controversial garbage goal (Rumpke goal) technique. NHL ‘94 also introduced manual goalie control. NHL '94 also added the ability to save user and player records, and has five modes: Exhibition Game, Playoffs, Best of Seven Playoffs, Shootout, and Demo. There are no international teams, but both all-star teams are present. Also introduced were team-specific organ songs played at the start of periods and after goals—examples include the Hartford Whalers' trademark "Brass Bonanza", "Halte-là! Les Canadiens sont là!" for the Montreal Canadiens, "When the Saints Go Marching In" for the St. Louis Blues, "The Sabre Dance" for the Buffalo Sabres, and the Chicago Blackhawks theme song "Here Come the Hawks". "Birthday" by the Beatles is also featured as an organ song after a goal is scored.

=== Game modes ===
- Exhibition Game
- Stanley Cup Playoffs: Single Game Series
- Stanley Cup Playoffs: Best of Seven Series
- Shootout Mini-Game
- Demo

== Development ==
Following the success of NHLPA Hockey '93, Electronic Arts initially planned its successor as NHLPA Hockey '94, retaining the NHL Players' Association licence but not the National Hockey League (NHL) licence. Producer Michael Brook intended to retain fighting, which the NHL had opposed in previous entries. After programmer Jim Simmons was reassigned to another project, Mark Lesser was tasked with programming the Genesis version. Lesser had previously worked on John Madden Football '93 and had little prior knowledge of ice hockey.

The developers prioritized accessible gameplay over strict simulation. Lesser focused on the game's camera angle, scrolling, puck control and speed, while developing the one timer, which became one of the game's defining additions. Igor Kuperman, then working in hockey operations for the Winnipeg Jets, rated players in twelve categories on a scale from zero to six; Brook converted these figures into the ratings used in the game with additional statistical information and a random factor. Los Angeles Kings coach Barry Melrose and assistant coach Cap Raeder were also shown a development version and provided feedback on its depiction of hockey.

For the game's arena music, Los Angeles Kings organist Dieter Ruehle recorded team-specific songs, reproducing variations used by individual NHL arena organists. EA's Canadian branch was assigned development of the Super NES and personal computer versions, with the Super NES version derived from Lesser's Genesis code.

Late in development, Electronic Arts sought to use NHL game footage in the Sega CD version, requiring permission from the league. EA consequently reached an agreement with the NHL under which fighting was removed and official team names and logos were incorporated. The game's title was subsequently changed from NHLPA Hockey '94 to NHL '94.

=== Marketing ===
Electronic Arts promoted the Mega Drive version of NHL '94 through print advertisements highlighting its four-player multiplayer functionality and officially licensed NHL teams and players. Advertisements appeared in American magazine GamePro and European publications including France's Mega Force and Sweden's Sega Force.

== Other versions ==
A version titled NHL Pro Hockey '94 (Note: Japanese: NHLプロホッケー'94, Hepburn: NHL Purohokkē' 94) was released in Japan for the Super Famicom which has all the important text in Japanese including the main menu, the actual hockey players, the secondary (end of period and post-game) menus, and the crowd meter. However, the passwords still use ASCII letters and numbers exclusively.

The National Hockey League had EA Sports remove fighting from the Sega CD version of the game.

The NHL '94 game engine was later used (albeit modified for extra violence) for EA's Sega Genesis game Mutant League Hockey.

A port of the game was included in the PlayStation 2 version of NHL 06. This port was based on the Sega Genesis version, but lacks the official NHL rosters from the original title. Furthermore, the Hartford Whalers were known as the Hartford Canes in that version, as a nod to the team's current name, the Carolina Hurricanes.

On July 11, 2013, it was announced that NHL 14 would include an NHL '94 Anniversary Mode, celebrating the 20th anniversary of NHL '94. It changes NHL 14 audiovisually and control-wise to resemble NHL '94, using the teams and players from the 2013-2014 NHL season, alongside the music from the Sega Genesis version. It also changes other gameplay elements like including faster game speed and having relaxed game rules. It would later return in the Xbox 360 and PS3 versions of NHL 15, using the teams and players from the 2014-15 NHL season, and NHL: Legacy Edition, using the teams and players from the 2015-16 NHL season, due to both games being based on NHL 14.

On October 2, 2020, it was announced that a port of NHL ‘94 titled NHL ‘94 Rewind, developed by Empty Clip Studios for the PlayStation 4 and Xbox One, using the Arsenal emulation software engine, would be released on October 30 for players who pre-ordered NHL 21. In December 2020, it became available for purchase to anyone, regardless of ownership of NHL 21. This version is based on the Sega Genesis version and features the teams and players from the 2020-21 NHL season.

== Reception ==
Reception

Review score
Publication	Score
AllGame	4.5/5 (Genesis); 3.5/5 (SNES); 4.5/5 (PC); 3.5/5 (SCD)

Computer Gaming World in 1993 stated that NHL Hockey for DOS had "a playing environment that is flush with realism, excitement and credibility". The magazine concluded that "players will lose themselves in the simulation and feel they are in control of a televised NHL broadcast ... an experience well worth the price of admission". In June 1994 it was a finalist for the magazine's Sports Game of the Year award, losing to Front Page Sports Football Pro. Allgame editor Scott Alan Marriot described NHL '94 as "the best playing hockey game at the time of its release".

GamePro gave the Sega CD version a perfect score, citing improved controls and playability from the already outstanding Genesis and SNES versions, as well as the use of real-life NHL footage.

European reception of the Mega Drive version was highly positive. British magazine Computer and Video Games awarded NHL '94 92%, praising its gameplay and four-player support, while noting that the changes from earlier entries were relatively modest. French magazine Joypad gave the game 90%, regarding it as one of the best ice hockey games available on consoles and praising its multiplayer gameplay. German magazine MAN!AC awarded it 89 out of 100, praising its expanded features and multiplayer support.

Italian magazine Game Power awarded the game 91 out of 100, praising its playability, depth and ability to reproduce the pace and excitement of ice hockey. Spanish magazine Todo Sega gave the game 85%, praising its fast-paced gameplay and expanded options while noting that it retained much of the style of its predecessor.

=== Sales ===
The game was also a commercial success. Programmer Mark Lesser recalled that NHL '94 outsold John Madden Football '93, which had sold one million copies, although Electronic Arts was unable to verify the game's sales figures due to the age of its financial records. In Sweden, the Mega Drive version of NHL '94 sold more than 20,000 copies, despite a retail price of 695 Swedish kronor at its release on 13 October 1993. According to video game historian Martin Lindell, it was the country's best-selling Mega Drive game of 1993, ahead of Disney's Aladdin and FIFA International Soccer.

=== Accolades ===
IGN ranked the game 59th on their "Top 100 SNES Games of All Time." They opined that NHL '94 "Truly defined hockey adaptations in the 16-bit era." They also praised the four-player multiplayer mode and described the single-player gameplay as "Fast and frantic pace of skating and slap-shotting here felt utterly unrivaled." The only criticism they had was that NHL '94 removed the option to brawl with the opposing team. In 1994, PC Gamer US named NHL Hockey the 11th-best computer game ever. The editors called it "nearly flawless in its representation of the speed and the strategies of full-tilt, real-time NHL hockey – and besides, it's one of the best PC games available." That same year, PC Gamer UK named it the 41st-best computer game of all time, calling it "one of the most enjoyable PC sports sims to date". In 1996, GamesMaster ranked the Mega Drive version 65th in its "Top 100 Games of All Time."

== Legacy ==
NHL '94 is often considered among the greatest sports games ever made, including number one by Boston.com. The Genesis version was included as #61 on Electronic Gaming Monthly's "100 Best Games of All Time" in 1997 and as #47 on IGN's Top 100 Games of All-Time in 2005. Bleacher Report listed it as the second-best hockey video game ever made (behind NHL 10) and called it "one of the best video games ever made". In 2012, GamesRadar ranked it as the 25th-best Sega Genesis game due in part to its realism; it jumped to 15th when the list was updated in 2014.

In Sweden, NHL '94 became part of Sega's push into the country's ice hockey market. Sega's Swedish distributor Brio used Mats Sundin as a spokesman for both NHLPA '93 and NHL '94. Brio had also become a sponsor of the Swedish Elitserien, placing Sega logos on players' helmets for visibility during television broadcasts. The success of EA's hockey games subsequently encouraged Brio and Electronic Arts to develop the Sweden-specific Elitserien 95 for the Mega Drive. In Finland, Pelaaja writer Miikka Lehtonen recalled that several NHL '94 leagues operated in Turku, with players manually recording results and statistics before holding playoffs; he also recalled an event where more than ten Mega Drive consoles were connected to televisions. Finnish cultural historian Rami Mähkä examined the game's influence on player identification in a 2019 academic study, using the popularity of Jeremy Roenick's virtual counterpart as a central example. Mähkä explored how sports video games allow players to identify alternately with real-life athletes, their virtual representations and the teams they control, arguing that this interaction helps explain the appeal of licensed sports simulations.

The game has also maintained an organized competitive following in North America. The inaugural King of '94 tournament, held in Toronto in 2015, attracted 128 competitors from across North America and was described by Pacific Standard as the world's largest NHL '94 tournament. Canadian filmmaker Mikey McBryan documented the game's enduring competitive following in Pixelated Heroes, a documentary released in October 2018 to coincide with the third King of '94 championship in Vancouver. The film explored the game's continued popularity among players and its competitive community. In 2018, a copy of NHL '94 was placed on display at the Hockey Hall of Fame in Toronto after broadcaster Arda Ocal submitted the game to the museum's archives.

Former NHL player Jeremy Roenick credits his fame to the exposure he received from NHL '94, as he was listed as one of the best players in the game.

The goal horn sound from the Sega Genesis version was used in the World of CHEL mode since NHL 19 as an unlockable goal horn.
