= John Madden Football '93 =

1992 American football video game

- North American Genesis box art
- Developer: Electronic Arts (Note: Genesis/Mega Drive port by LookingGlass Technologies)
- Publisher: Electronic Arts (Note: Originally released under the Electronic Arts Sports Network banner; later versions were released under the imprint's new name, EA Sports.)
- Producer: Scott Orr
- Programmer: Mark Lesser
- Artist: Douglas Wike
- Composer: Rob Hubbard
- Series: Madden NFL
- Platforms: Super NES, Genesis/Mega Drive
- Release: Super NES: NA: November 1992; PAL: 1992; Genesis/Mega Drive: NA: December 1992; EU: December 17, 1992
- Genre: Sports (American football)
- Modes: Single-player, multiplayer

John Madden Football '93 is a 1992 American football video game developed and published by Electronic Arts for the Super NES and Sega Genesis. The player controls a football team in modes such as tournament play and sudden death. Officially endorsed by John Madden, it was the third Madden game for the Genesis and the second for the SNES, being the first title in the series to receive a simultaneous release on both platforms.

The Genesis version was developed by LookingGlass Technologies, which was simultaneously creating Ultima Underworld: The Stygian Abyss. John Madden Football '93 adds new animations and features, and allows players to play as and against famous teams such as the 1976 Oakland Raiders. Aside from Madden Football 64, the game was the last in the Madden franchise to lack the NFL license, which was featured in Madden NFL '94 onward.

Upon its release, John Madden Football '93 was a commercial success, and went on to sell more than a million copies. Critics awarded the game high scores and praised its updated graphics, but several reviewers complained that little had changed since John Madden Football '92. Royalties from the game funded the expansion of LookingGlass Technologies, and the company's director, Paul Neurath, later commented that the size of these royalties led EA to develop future Madden titles in-house.

The game can be played on the Nintendo 64 and PlayStation version of Madden NFL 2002, as well as the PlayStation versions of Madden NFL 2003 to 2005, including the collector's edition of the latter game on the PlayStation 2, with updated rosters and official NFL team licenses.

== Gameplay ==
The player selects a play. The timer for the quarter is on the right of the screen, while the current down and remaining yards are near the bottom.

John Madden Football '93 is an adaptation of American football that takes place from an isometric perspective in a two-dimensional environment. The player begins each match by selecting such variables as the game mode, weather conditions and team(s). Game modes include pre-season, regular season, playoffs, and sudden death. In addition to the game's single-player mode, two-player competitive and cooperative modes are available. Unlike in prior games in the series, a coin toss at the beginning of every match determines which team will kick off, and which team will defend each goal.

Before every down, the player selects a personnel grouping, formation, play and, on defense, coverage shell from a menu. The game contains fifty-five offensive plays and seventy-one defensive plays, such as screen and play-action passes, blitzes and man-to-man defense. During a down, the player may control one team member at a time or allow the entire team to execute a play automatically. On offense, depending on the play, the player controls the quarterback, running back or kicker. After a pass, control automatically changes to the ball receiver. On defense, the player may at any time switch control between any members of the team. Instant replay is available to review plays.

New features in John Madden Football '93 include no-huddle offense, overturning certain calls made by referees, taunting, stumbling, head-butting and one-handed catches. As with its predecessors, the game features updated statistics for the twenty-eight NFL teams in the game, based on their performance in the previous season. In addition to these teams, eight famous team line-ups, such as the Oakland Raiders of 1976 and the Dallas Cowboys of 1977, are available. An "All-Madden Greats" team is compiled from the best players in the history of the sport and an "All-Madden" team is compiled of recent standout players. No official player or team names, colors, or stadium names are used.

A special version of the game for the Sega Genesis, titled John Madden Football: Championship Edition, was initially released as a rental-only game before it was later re-released exclusively via direct mail. This version of the game uses only "championship caliber" line-ups from the 1966-1991 era. Although it still lacks official names, this version features correct team colors.

== Development ==
John Madden Football '93 was developed for the Sega Genesis by LookingGlass Technologies, which was simultaneously working on Ultima Underworld: The Stygian Abyss. The game was not a port, but was rather an original work by the company. They were approached by Electronic Arts soon after production on Ultima Underworld began, an event that company head Paul Neurath later attributed to contacts he had within the publisher, thanks to his involvement with the Electronic Arts project Chuck Yeager's Advanced Flight Trainer. Neurath said that Electronic Arts was dissatisfied with the work that another studio had been doing on John Madden Football '93, and that the publisher was "scrambling to find a [replacement] team" to meet the game's rapidly approaching deadline. Looking Glass received the source code of John Madden Football '92 and had to develop a sequel in five months. Neurath later said that development was "part out-of-house and part in-house". The game's visuals were made by Doug Wike, who also created graphics for Ultima Underworld. In 1991, Neurath contracted the outside programmer Mark Lesser, who had previously worked on Mean 18, to develop the game's technical aspects. According to Lesser, this was necessary because none of LookingGlass's employees had experience programming for the Sega Genesis.

Neurath believed that LookingGlass introduced "some nice improvements" to the franchise. A preview in Mega noted that the game had "a lot of added animation" compared to its predecessors. A writer for Mega Drive Advanced Gaming believed that "the most obvious addition is the digitised speech", which did not appear in the game's Super NES version. In its November 1992 issue, Electronic Gaming Monthly estimated that the game was "100% complete". The game's Genesis and SNES versions were released at the same time. As with earlier John Madden Football titles, John Madden Football '93 lacks the NFL license, which prevented the inclusion of official teams, colors, player names and stadiums. Sega's competing title, the Joe Montana-endorsed NFL Sports Talk Football '93, had received the license that year.

Nintendo Entertainment System and Game Boy ports of the game were licensed and developed by Ubi Soft but were cancelled. A prototype of the cancelled Game Boy version was obtained from the Nintendo data leak.

== Reception ==
Reception

Review scores
Publication	Score
GamePro	4.5/4.0/5.0/5.0 (MD/Gen); 4.5/4.0/4.5/4.5 (SNES)
Mega	95%
Mean Machines Sega	89 out of 100
N-Force	93 out of 100

John Madden Football '93 was a commercial success, with over one million copies sold. It has been cited as the highest-selling game developed by Looking Glass Studios, and Neurath later called it "one of the most successful games I've ever worked on". Paul Mellerick of Mega commented that "the only noticeable difference between [John Madden Football '93] and its two predecessors is the animation". He wrote that this new animation "makes the game incredibly good to look at" and that new motions like stumbling increase the game's difficulty. Although he believed that the "two-player mode is just as exciting as ever", he was disappointed by the lack of a full-season mode, which he called "unforgivable" in light of this feature's appearance in Sega's NFL Sports Talk Football '93. He concluded that John Madden Football '93 was "the best game the Mega Drive has to offer", but he wrote, "If you own John Madden Football '92, or even the original John Madden American Football for that matter, then you should ignore this game completely".

A writer for GamePro noted that John Madden Football '93 was "at first glance" largely identical to its predecessor; but he believed that, "once you get down to serious business, you'll notice a wealth of All-Star enhancements". He wrote that the "game play is now faster and smoother", and that "the graphics are sharper, more detailed, and even better animated". He believed that "Electronic Arts has [...] made the best even better", and he concluded, "John Madden Football '93 is even more fun to play than Madden '92". The staff of Mean Machines Sega called the game "hopelessly redundant" and "very, very disappoint[ing]", and they believed that the John Madden Football series was "on its last legs". They considered the game to be arguably worse than its predecessors, largely because of framerate problems. The reviewers concluded that it was "not a bad game at all", but they suggested that readers buy "the slightly better John Madden Football '92 if [they are] after the definitive American Football game".

Reviewing the SNES version of John Madden Football '93, a GamePro writer believed that it was "a major improvement" over the previous SNES John Madden Football title. He wrote that the game's visuals were the biggest leap, particularly after the "slow and chunky" graphics of the earlier release. He enjoyed its sound effects, but he noted the lack of voice clips present in the Genesis version. He concluded that the series was now roughly even across the two consoles, and he wrote that the game was "a strong candidate for SNES Sports Cart of the Year". A writer for Nintendo Power wrote, "Madden '93 is easy to play and has the feel of the real game". He believed that the most noticeable additions were the new teams and "new play options", although he found it "awkward" to select plays. He finished, "Really the only thing missing is an option to play an entire season". Carl Rowley of N-Force called the visuals "sharper than ever" and believed that the character sprites were "small but well defined". He found that the game played "brilliantly", and he praised the instant replay feature as "superb" and "amazing". He wrote that his "only niggle is the lack of sampled speech", which he considered to be "a bit of a let down". Finishing his review, Rowley wrote that the game was the "best American football game available".

=== Legacy ===
After the game's development concluded, programmer Mark Lesser was contracted by Electronic Arts to work on NHL '94, a series that he remained on "for many years". Neurath said that the royalties LookingGlass received from John Madden Football '93 "were quite substantial", and that "it was really the royalties of Madden more than anything else [...] that allowed us to grow the [company]". Neurath believed that the size of these royalties led Electronic Arts to develop future Madden games in-house, in order to maximize profit. Aside from Madden Football 64, John Madden Football '93 was the last game in the Madden franchise to lack the NFL license, which the series first obtained with Madden NFL '94. In 2012, Michael Rundle wrote in The Huffington Post that John Madden Football '93 "really set the bar" for the franchise, and he believed that its gameplay was superior to that of Madden NFL 13.
