= Don Mattrick =

Canadian businessman

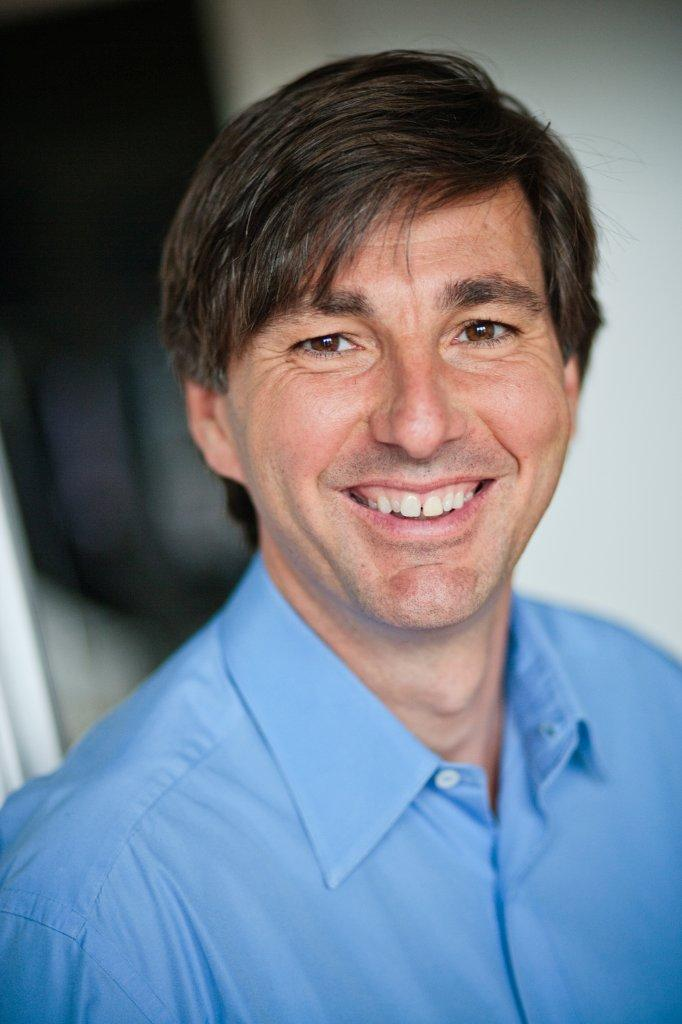
- Mattrick in 2010
- Born: Donald Allan Mattrick; February 13, 1964 (age 62); Vancouver, Canada
- Years active: 1982–present
- Known for: Developing Xbox Kinect; Failed launch of the Xbox One
- Family: Philippe de Gaspé Beaubien (father-in-law)

Donald Allan Mattrick OBC (born February 13, 1964) is a Canadian businessman who co-founded Distinctive Software (DSI) in 1982 in Vancouver at age 17, while graduating from high school and attending Simon Fraser University where he studied business and managerial economics. DSI became the largest independent game developer in North America and was later acquired by Electronic Arts in 1991. Mattrick worked at EA Canada for 15 years as the president of Worldwide Studios. In 2007, he joined Microsoft as the president of the Interactive Entertainment Business, notably working to develop the Kinect for Xbox 360. Mattrick was the CEO of publicly trading social gaming company Zynga from 2013 to 2015.

== Career ==
=== Distinctive Software ===
In 1982, Mattrick and Jeff Sember co-founded Distinctive Software (DSI), creating the video game Evolution on the Apple II. Sember sold his equity stake in DSI to Mattrick in 1986. Paul Lee joined the board in the same year. In 1989, Paul Lee invested in DSI, becoming the only other shareholder, also taking on a full-time operating role as both the CFO and COO. In 1991, Mattrick was the chairman and the majority owner of DSI while Canadian businessman Tarrnie Williams was CEO. In the prior year, DSI had received two unsolicited acquisition offers. Instead of accepting, Mattrick chose to reach out to Trip Hawkins, founder of Electronic Arts, to discuss synergies between the two companies, leading to the subsequent acquisition of DSI by Electronic Arts (EA) which was accomplished through a pooling of interest transaction in July 1991. Prior to the acquisition, DSI was the largest independent game developer in North America and had 75 full-time employees working on various projects with companies like Konami, Broderbund, IBM, Disney, Mindscape and Accolade. DSI was best known for developing racing and sports games for the Amiga, Apple II, Commodore 64, and PC DOS platforms.

=== Electronic Arts ===
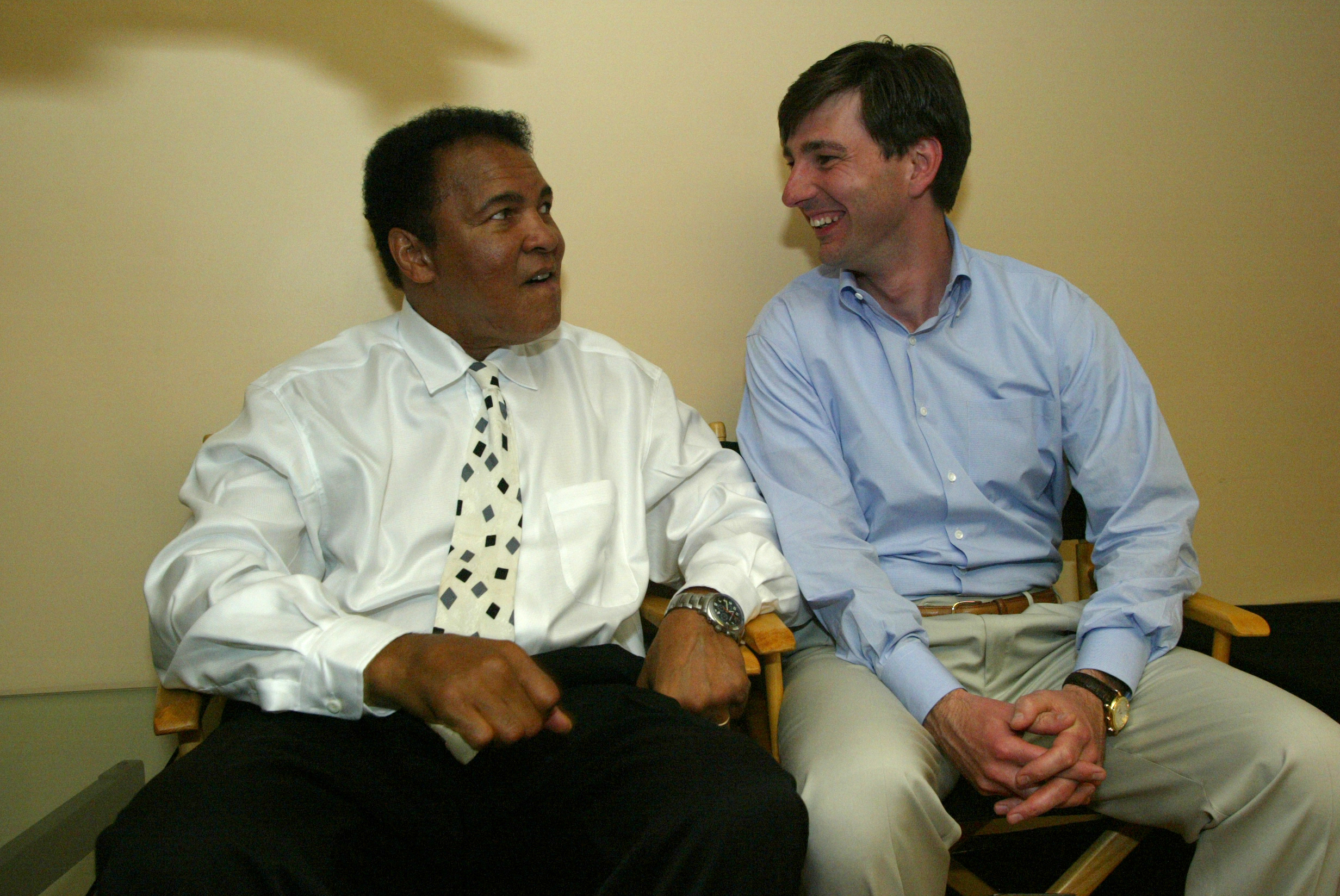
Muhammad Ali and Don Mattrick at the Electronic Entertainment Expo in 2004

Mattrick worked in a variety of leadership positions at Electronic Arts and, prior to leaving the company in 2005, was the president of Worldwide Studios for Electronic Arts where he oversaw EA's global studios and research and development in several major sites, including Redwood Shores, California (Silicon Valley), EALA in Los Angeles, EA Tiburon in Florida, EA Canada in Vancouver, British Columbia, and Montreal, and EA UK in Chertsey, England.

=== Microsoft ===
Following his retirement from Electronic Arts in February 2007, Mattrick was asked by Robert J. Bach to be an external advisor to the Entertainment and Devices Division. In July 2007, Mattrick officially joined Microsoft as a senior vice president overseeing the Xbox 360 and PC gaming businesses, with his oversight apparently leading to an increase in video game installations and Xbox LIVE subscriptions.

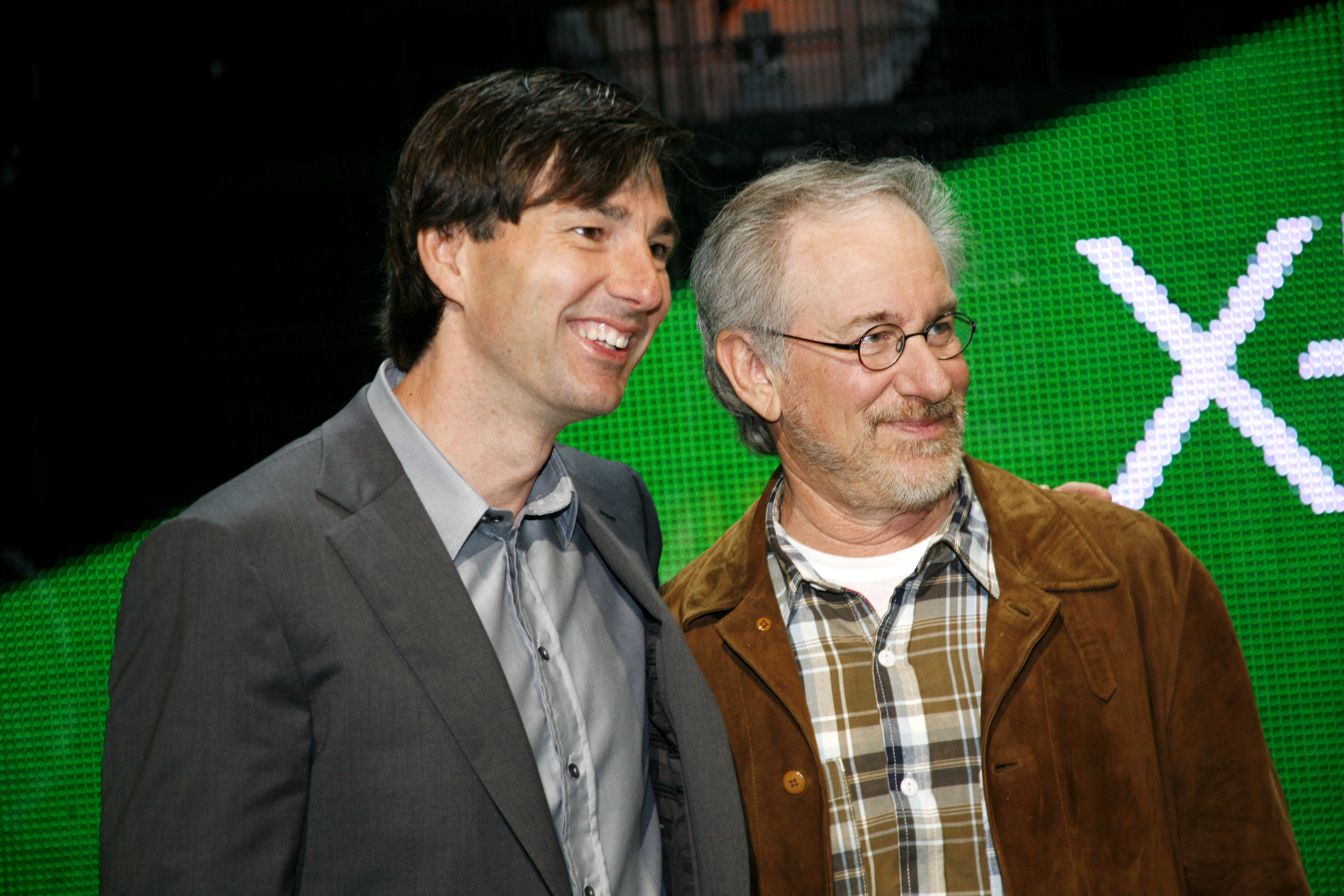
Don Mattrick and Steven Spielberg at the Xbox E3 2009 media briefing

Mattrick is also largely credited for his work in developing Kinect for Xbox 360. Mattrick unveiled Kinect under the code-name of "Project Natal" at E3 2009 on stage with Steven Spielberg.

In October 2010, Mattrick was promoted to president of the Interactive Entertainment Business, overseeing a range of consumer businesses including Xbox 360, Xbox LIVE, Kinect, Music, and Video, as well as PC and mobile interactive entertainment.

In August 2011, Fortune magazine named Mattrick one of the "Smartest People in Tech 2011", and cited his role in developing and releasing Kinect. In May 2012, Mattrick was named one of CNN Money's top 10 brilliant technology visionaries.

On May 21, 2013, Mattrick unveiled the new Xbox One, the successor to the Xbox 360, an all-in-one entertainment system. He later dismissed criticisms of the system's "always on" internet connection by saying "We have a product for people who aren't able to get some form of connectivity; it's called Xbox 360."

Mattrick left Microsoft on July 1, 2013, to join Zynga as CEO and would eventually be replaced by Phil Spencer as Head of Xbox in 2014.

In Power On: The Story of Xbox, a web series documentary on Xbox released in December 2021, Mattrick commented on the Xbox One's controversial and unpopular launch strategy, admitting that the Xbox One reveal event was too focused on TV features and that he and his team "could have done a better job of reassuring people that we were committed to excellence in gaming."

=== Zynga ===
On July 1, 2013, it was confirmed that Mattrick was leaving Microsoft to join social game company Zynga as CEO. Wall Street investors thought positively of Mattrick's appointment and Zynga's shares greatly rose the day the news was made public. On his first quarterly financial earnings call with Zynga, on July 25, 2013, Mattrick predicted volatility for the company over the coming 6 months to one year, stating a need to "get back to basics" and "take a longer term view on our products and business."

By 2015, Zynga was struggling to achieve the success in the mobile market they intended, largely seen in their falling and stagnating stock price. On April 8, 2015, it was announced that Mattrick would immediately resign as Zynga's CEO, and was replaced by founder Mark Pincus. Regarding Mattrick, Pincus said, "He got us in the game in mobile in a big way, and I'm appreciative of that."

=== MdGB Capital ===
Mattrick is the co-founder and co-president of MdGB Capital, a private company that manages a group assets and operating companies throughout North America and serves as an adviser to many high tech ventures such as Photonic, Nordeus, Dapper Labs and Hivestack.

== Honours and awards ==
Mattrick was made a member of the Order of British Columbia in 2024. He is the 2017 Distinguished Entrepreneur of the Year Gustavson School of Business at the University of Victoria, the 2005 Honorary Fellow University of British Columbia's Sauder School of Business and a 1999 honorary Doctor of Laws at Simon Fraser University. Mattrick was the Co-Chair of the British Columbia's Premier's Technology Council from 2016 to 2018 and serves since 2019 on the board of directors of the Vancouver Prostate Centre.
