= NHL 95 =

1994 video game

- North American Genesis box art
- Developers: High Score Productions/Double Diamond Sports (Genesis); Visual Concepts (SNES); Realtime Associates Seattle (Game Gear); Probe Entertainment (Game Boy); EA Sports (MS-DOS)
- Publishers: EA Sports; THQ (Note: Released under the Malibu Games brand) (Game Boy)
- Composers: Rob Hubbard; Russell Lieblich
- Series: NHL
- Platforms: MS-DOS, Super NES, Genesis/Mega Drive, Game Gear, Game Boy,
- Release: Genesis/Mega Drive: NA: September 1994; EU: September 23, 1994; Super NES: NA: November 1994; EU: December 8, 1994; MS-DOS: NA: 1994; Game Boy: NA: June 1995; EU: 1995; Game Gear: NA: 1995; EU: 1995
- Genre: Sports (ice hockey)
- Modes: Single-player, multiplayer

NHL 95 (also known as NHL Hockey 95) is an ice hockey video game published by EA Sports. It was released in 1994 for the Super Nintendo Entertainment System and the Sega Genesis. The team rosters and player attributes in the game reflect that of the 1994–95 NHL season.

== Reception ==
Reception

Review scores
Publication	Score
AllGame	4/5 (Genesis); 3.5/5 (SNES)
Next Generation	4/5 (Genesis); 4/5 (DOS)
CD-ROM Today	4.5/5 (DOS)

GamePro gave the Genesis version a perfect score and called it "the smoothest, most entertaining hockey title ever created", citing the ability to sign, trade, and release real NHL players, the ability to create one's own fantasy players, the advanced statistics tracking, the new injury animations, the realistic sounds, and "the unbelievably blazing speed of the game". They declared the SNES version to be "just average" due to the vastly inferior controls and sound effects as compared to the Genesis version, as well as the removal of content such as shootout mode, playoff mode, fake shots, and drop-passes. They were still less enthusiastic about the Game Boy version, saying that its impressive graphics and selection of modes are outweighed by the frustration generated by the limited two-button control. They also commented, "The sprites are large and detailed, but that creates another problem. The bigger the players, the less ice that fits on the tiny screen, so you almost need a map to find the net."

Next Generation reviewed the PC version of the game, rating it four stars out of five, and stated that "A must for any serious hockey fan."

Next Generation reviewed the Genesis version of the game, rating it four stars out of five, and stated that "EA shoots and scores again with the best NHL action anywhere, and possibly the only NHL action anywhere."

In 1995, Total! ranked the game 32nd on their Top 100 SNES Games. In the same year, Flux magazine rated the Sega Genesis version 9th in its Top 100 Video Games. They lauded the game writing: "NHL '95 is not only the epitome of hockey carts, but also one of the most brilliantly engaging sports contests in gaming history."
