= Momelotinib =

Medication

Names
- Preferred IUPAC name N-(Cyanomethyl)-4-{2-[4-(morpholin-4-yl)anilino]pyrimidin-4-yl}benzamide
- Other names: CYT-387; CYT-11387; GS-0387; Ojjaara; Omjjara

Identifiers
CAS Number	1056634-68-4; as dihydrochloride: 1380317-28-1; 1841094-17-4
3D model (JSmol)	Interactive image; as dihydrochloride: Interactive image
ChEBI	CHEBI:91407
ChEMBL	ChEMBL1078178
ChemSpider	24676202
DrugBank	DB11763; as dihydrochloride: DBSALT003445
IUPHAR/BPS	7791
KEGG	D10315; as dihydrochloride: D10358; D10889
PubChem CID	25062766
UNII	6O01GMS00P; as dihydrochloride: RBH995N496; LDX8893L5D
CompTox Dashboard (EPA)	DTXSID801026049
- InChI: InChI=1S/C23H22N6O2/c24-10-12-25-22(30)18-3-1-17(2-4-18)21-9-11-26-23(28-21)27-19-5-7-20(8-6-19)29-13-15-31-16-14-29/h1-9,11H,12-16H2,(H,25,30)(H,26,27,28) Key: ZVHNDZWQTBEVRY-UHFFFAOYSA-N
- SMILES: c1cc(ccc1c2ccnc(n2)Nc3ccc(cc3)N4CCOCC4)C(=O)NCC#N; as dihydrochloride: Cl.Cl.O=C(NCC#N)C1=CC=C(C=C1)C1=NC(NC2=CC=C(C=C2)N2CCOCC2)=NC=C1

Properties
Chemical formula	C_{23}H_{22}N_{6}O_{2}
Molar mass	414.469 g·mol^{−1}

Pharmacology
ATC code	L01EJ04 (WHO)
Routes of administration	By mouth
Legal status	AU: S4 (Prescription only); CA: ℞-only; US: ℞-only; EU: Rx-only
- Except where otherwise noted, data are given for materials in their standard state (at 25 °C [77 °F], 100 kPa). Infobox references

Momelotinib
Clinical data
- Other names: Momelotinib hydrochloride hydrate (JAN JP), Momelotinib dihydrochloride (USAN US)
- License data: US DailyMed: Momelotinib

Identifiers
- PDB ligand: C87 (PDBe, RCSB PDB)
- CompTox Dashboard (EPA): DTXSID801026049

Momelotinib, sold under the brand name Ojjaara among others, is an anticancer medication used for the treatment of myelofibrosis. It is a Janus kinase inhibitor and it is taken by mouth.

The most common adverse reactions include dizziness, fatigue, bacterial infection, hemorrhage, thrombocytopenia, diarrhea, and nausea.

Momelotinib was approved for medical use in the United States in September 2023, and in the European Union in January 2024.

== Medical uses ==
Momelotinib is indicated for the treatment of intermediate or high-risk myelofibrosis in adults with anemia.

== Pharmacology ==
=== Pharmacodynamics ===
It is an inhibitor of Janus kinases JAK1 and JAK2, acting as an ATP competitor with IC_{50} values of 11 and 18 nM, respectively. The inhibitor is significantly less active towards other kinases, including JAK3 (IC_{50} = 0.16 μM).

== Society and culture ==
=== Legal status ===
In November 2023, the Committee for Medicinal Products for Human Use (CHMP) of the European Medicines Agency (EMA) adopted a positive opinion, recommending the granting of a marketing authorization for the medicinal product Omjjara, intended for the treatment of disease-related splenomegaly or symptoms in adults with moderate-to-severe anemia who have primary myelofibrosis, post-polycythaemia vera myelofibrosis or post-essential thrombocythaemia myelofibrosis. The applicant for this medicinal product is Glaxosmithkline Trading Services Limited. Momelotinib was approved for medical use in the European Union in January 2024.
