= NHL 2012 =

NHL 2012 may refer to:

- 2011–12 NHL season
- 2012–13 NHL season
- NHL 12, video game
- 2012 National Hurling League
