= Steven Stamkos =

Canadian ice hockey player (born 1990)

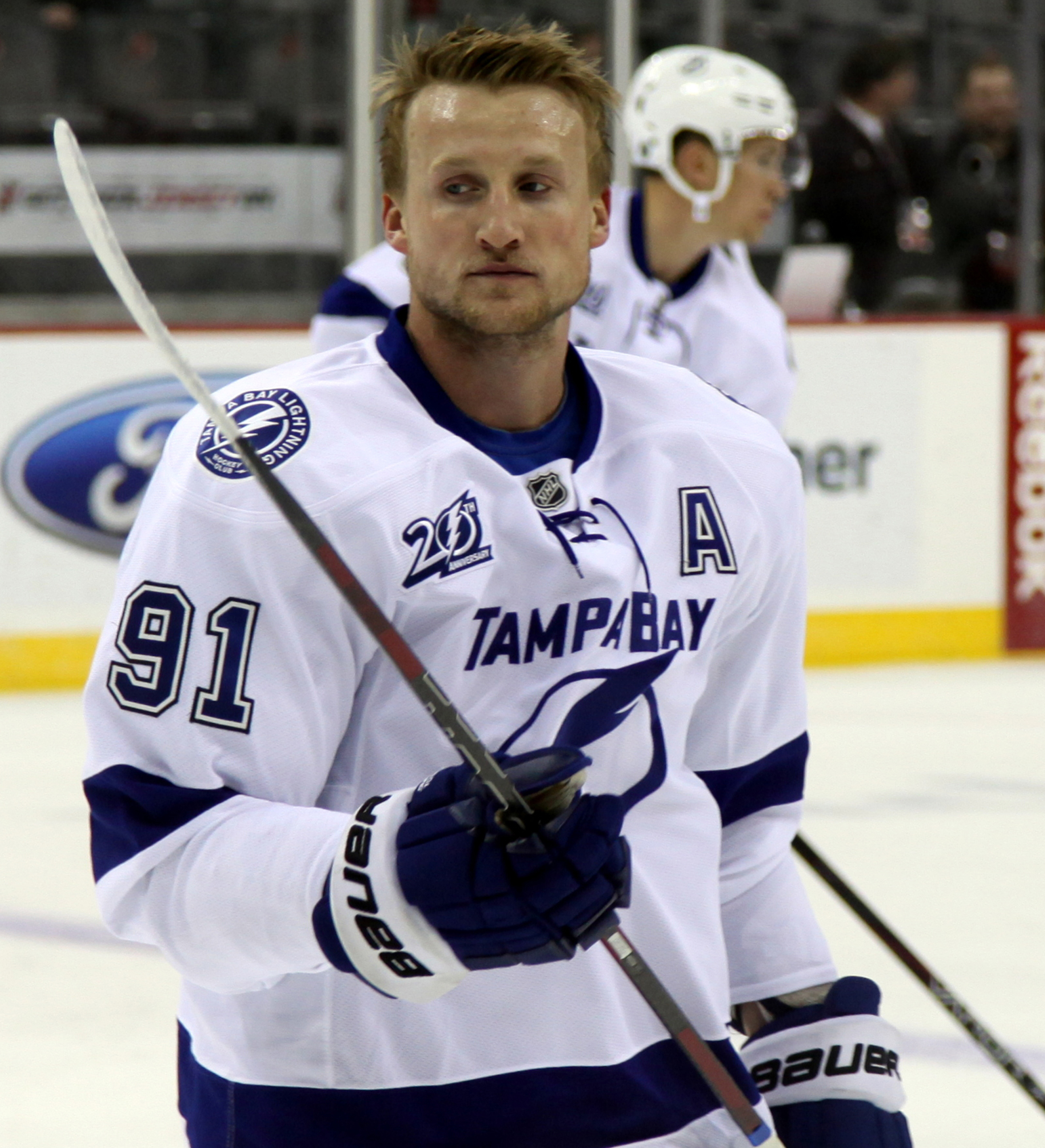
- Stamkos with the Tampa Bay Lightning in February 2013
- Born: February 7, 1990 (age 36) Markham, Ontario, Canada
- Height: 6 ft 1 in (185 cm)
- Weight: 193 lb (88 kg; 13 st 11 lb)
- Position: Forward
- Shoots: Right
- NHL team Former teams: Nashville Predators; Tampa Bay Lightning
- National team: Canada
- NHL draft: 1st overall, 2008; Tampa Bay Lightning
- Playing career: 2008–present

Steven Stamkos (born February 7, 1990) is a Canadian professional ice hockey player who is a forward and alternate captain for the Nashville Predators of the National Hockey League (NHL). Nicknamed "Stammer", Stamkos was selected first overall in the 2008 NHL entry draft by the Tampa Bay Lightning, and is regarded as both one of the best to have played for and the long-time face of the franchise. Stamkos holds the Lightning franchise record for most goals scored and captained the Lightning to back-to-back Stanley Cup championships in 2020 and 2021, a potential-but-failed three-peat in 2022, as well as an appearance in the Final games in 2015. Stamkos previously held the Lightning record for points, which stood for four years until broken by Nikita Kucherov in 2026.

He is a two-time Maurice "Rocket" Richard Trophy winner as the NHL's leading goal-scorer (2010 and 2012), while also the runner-up three other times (in 2011, 2013 and 2015), a Mark Messier Leadership Award winner (2023), a two-time NHL second team All-Star (2011, 2012), and has been named to seven NHL All-Star Games. He has scored the most goals of any player born in the 1990s. He was also a Hart Memorial Trophy finalist in 2012 as the most valuable player to his team as voted by the Professional Hockey Writers' Association, a two-time Ted Lindsay Award finalist (2011 and 2012) as the best player judged by the National Hockey League Players' Association. In addition, he was the runner-up for the Art Ross Trophy as the leading point-scorer two consecutive times (2012 and 2013).

== Early life ==
Stamkos is of Macedonian and Scottish descent. He grew up in Unionville, Ontario, and played for the Markham Waxers in the Eastern AAA Hockey League of the Ontario Minor Hockey Association (OMHA). During one of his seasons with the North York Canadiens, he was teammates with NHLer P. K. Subban. Stamkos won eight OMHA titles in a row in minor hockey and led his Waxers club to the OHL Cup title in March 2006. He played in the 2003 Quebec International Pee-Wee Hockey Tournament with the Markham Waxers.

Stamkos attended Central Park Public School and St. Brother André Catholic High School in Markham, Ontario. After being drafted by the OHL's Sarnia Sting, he attended Northern Collegiate Institute and Vocational School in Sarnia.

== Playing career ==
=== Junior ===
Following a season with the minor Waxers in which he scored 197 points over 66 games, Stamkos was selected first overall in the 2006 OHL Draft by the Sarnia Sting. Stamkos played with other notable current and former NHLers in his minor and junior hockey career, including Logan Couture, John Tavares, Michael Del Zotto, Cameron Gaunce, Cody Hodgson, and P. K. Subban during his minor hockey career in the Greater Toronto Area. Joining the Sting in 2006–07, he recorded 92 points (42 goals and 50 assists) over 63 games as a junior rookie. He was named to the OHL Second All-Rookie Team, ranking behind Sam Gagner at the center position. Stamkos also won the Bobby Smith Trophy as the OHL's scholastic player of the year for his academic efforts off the ice.

The following season, Stamkos improved to 58 goals and 105 points over 61 games. He was named to the OHL second All-Star team, but was later selected to the CHL first All-Star team, which encompasses all three national major junior leagues. Playing in his NHL draft-eligible season in 2007–08, Stamkos was top-ranked throughout the campaign by the NHL Central Scouting Bureau and International Scouting Services. He also won the CHL's Top Draft Prospect Award.

=== Professional (2008–present) ===
==== Tampa Bay Lightning (2008–2024) ====
As the 2008 NHL entry draft approached, Stamkos was largely seen as the best available center. His primary competition for the top overall pick was top prospect defencemen Drew Doughty and Zach Bogosian, as well as Russian winger Nikita Filatov. The Tampa Bay Lightning, by virtue of their previous season in which they won an NHL-worst 31 games, owned the first pick. As expected, Stamkos was selected first overall by Tampa Bay. On July 29, 2008, he signed a three-year, entry-level contract with the Lightning in which he could earn as much as $8.55 million in performance bonuses. Leading up to the start of the upcoming 2008–09 season, the Lightning centered their promotional efforts around Stamkos, including a website with the slogan "Seen Stamkos?"

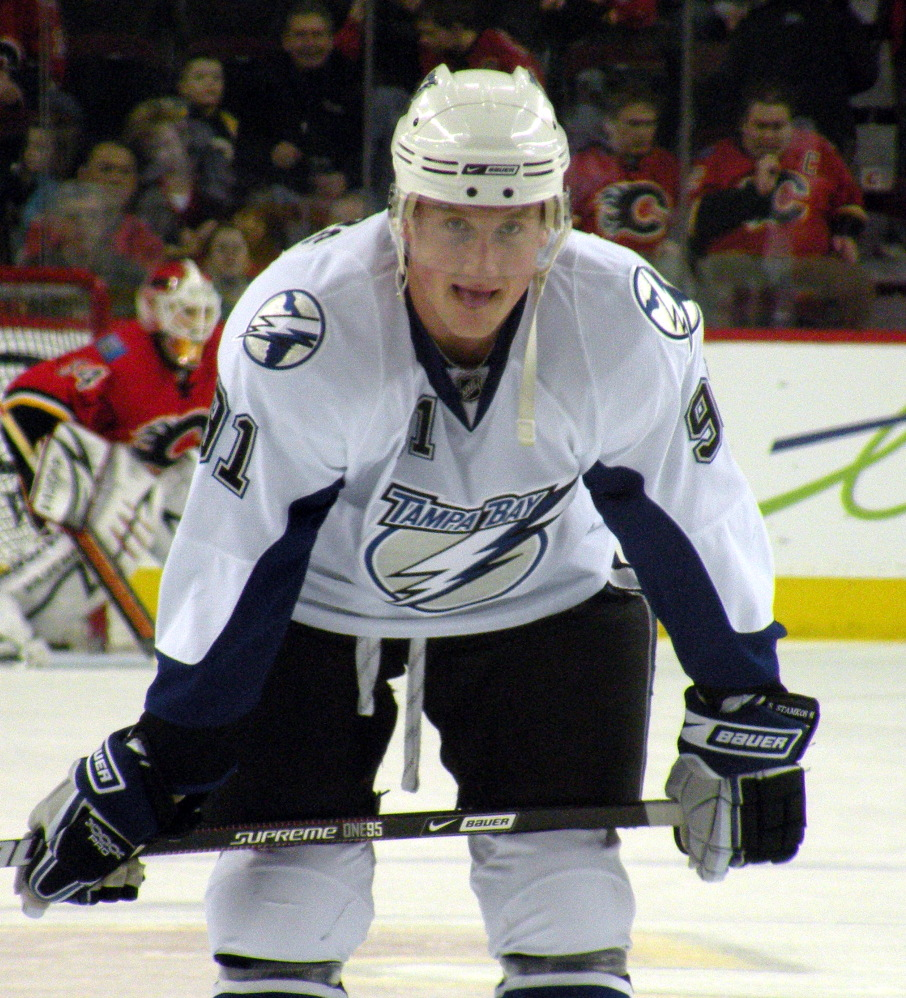
Stamkos with the Lightning in March 2009. The 2008–09 season was his rookie season in the NHL.

Stamkos played in his first NHL game on October 4, 2008, in Prague, Czech Republic, the first game of the 2008–09 season. The Lightning fell to the New York Rangers 2–1 and were eventually swept in Prague. He recorded his first point – a secondary assist – in his eighth game, on a goal scored by Vincent Lecavalier which was against his hometown team, the Toronto Maple Leafs. Following the game, Stamkos commented that his hometown support was "louder than when the Leafs scored". He scored his first goal the next game against Ryan Miller of the Buffalo Sabres. After 54 games, Stamkos recorded the first NHL hat-trick of his career, on February 17, 2009. The Lightning held a 3–1 lead midway through the second period on the strength of Stamkos' natural hat-trick, but were still beaten by the visiting Chicago Blackhawks, 5–3. The three goals enabled Stamkos to become the first rookie in Lightning history to score three goals in a game. He also became the second-youngest player in NHL history to record a natural hat-trick; current record-holder Bobby Carpenter was 18 when he scored three on February 25, 1982. Though Stamkos was heavily criticized for his lack of production during the first half of the season, in which he was limited to less than ten minutes of ice time some games (largely due to a dispute amongst then-head coach Barry Melrose and upper management, mainly co-owner Len Barrie on how to approach the development of Stamkos in the NHL), he finished the season with 19 points in his final 20 games. In his rookie season, Stamkos totaled 23 goals, 23 assists and 46 points, as well as a −13 plus-minus rating in 79 games.

In the 2009 off-season, Stamkos spent the summer training extensively with newly retired NHL player Gary Roberts, working on adding strength and endurance. Roberts got to know Stamkos as a teammate on the Lightning in the 2008–09 season, his last season in the NHL. He oversaw Stamkos' off-season workouts north of Toronto in Roberts' in-house gym, which is a quick drive from Stamkos' family home in Unionville. Stamkos spoke highly regarding the workouts: "It helped me a lot," Stamkos said. "I learned a lot about what I needed to improve on. There are certain aspects of my game that have improved because of that, and I'll be there again this summer working hard. It definitely gave me that extra jump for this season." In the 2009–10 season, his second year in the NHL, Stamkos began to find his range as an NHL sharpshooter and had a breakout season. Playing the bulk of the season on the first line with Martin St. Louis and Steve Downie, Stamkos started the campaign with 10 goals and five assists for 15 points in his first 11 games. Through mid-January, the entirety of February and mid-March, Stamkos had an 18-game point streak (17 goals and 16 assists for 33 points in all 18 games between January 19, 2010, in a 8–2 loss to the New York Rangers and March 11, in a 4–3 OT loss to his hometown team, the Toronto Maple Leafs). By the time he turned 20 in February 2010, he was in the top five in the NHL in scoring (with 32 goals and 29 assists for 61 points in every game up to that point in the season), challenging the likes of the generational talents of Washington Capitals forward and captain Alexander Ovechkin and Pittsburgh Penguins forward and captain Sidney Crosby. On April 10, the second-to-last day of the season, Stamkos reached the 50-goal mark for the season when he scored two goals against Tampa Bay's inner-state rival, the Florida Panthers. He also recorded an assist on a Martin St. Louis goal in the same game as the Lighting would go on to win the game 4–3 in a shootout. He ended the season with 51 goals, tied for most in the NHL with Sidney Crosby of the Pittsburgh Penguins; the two shared the Rocket Richard Trophy as the NHL's goal-scoring leaders; he tied Crosby in the final minute of the last game of the season with an empty-net goal. Stamkos became the third-youngest player to score 50 goals in a season, after Wayne Gretzky and Jimmy Carson. His number of goals (51) was five more than his total points amount in the previous season (46). Additionally, Stamkos' 44 assists gave him 95 points within the season, good for fifth in the NHL behind Henrik Sedin, Alexander Ovechkin, Sidney Crosby and Nicklas Bäckström, respectively. Despite Stamkos’ rise to stardom individually, however, Tampa Bay as a team finished the year 12th in the East with 34 wins and 80 points, eight points out of a playoff spot. After the season, the team's poor record prompted new team owner Jeffrey Vinik to terminate Brian Lawton and Rick Tocchet's contracts as general manager and head coach, respectively.

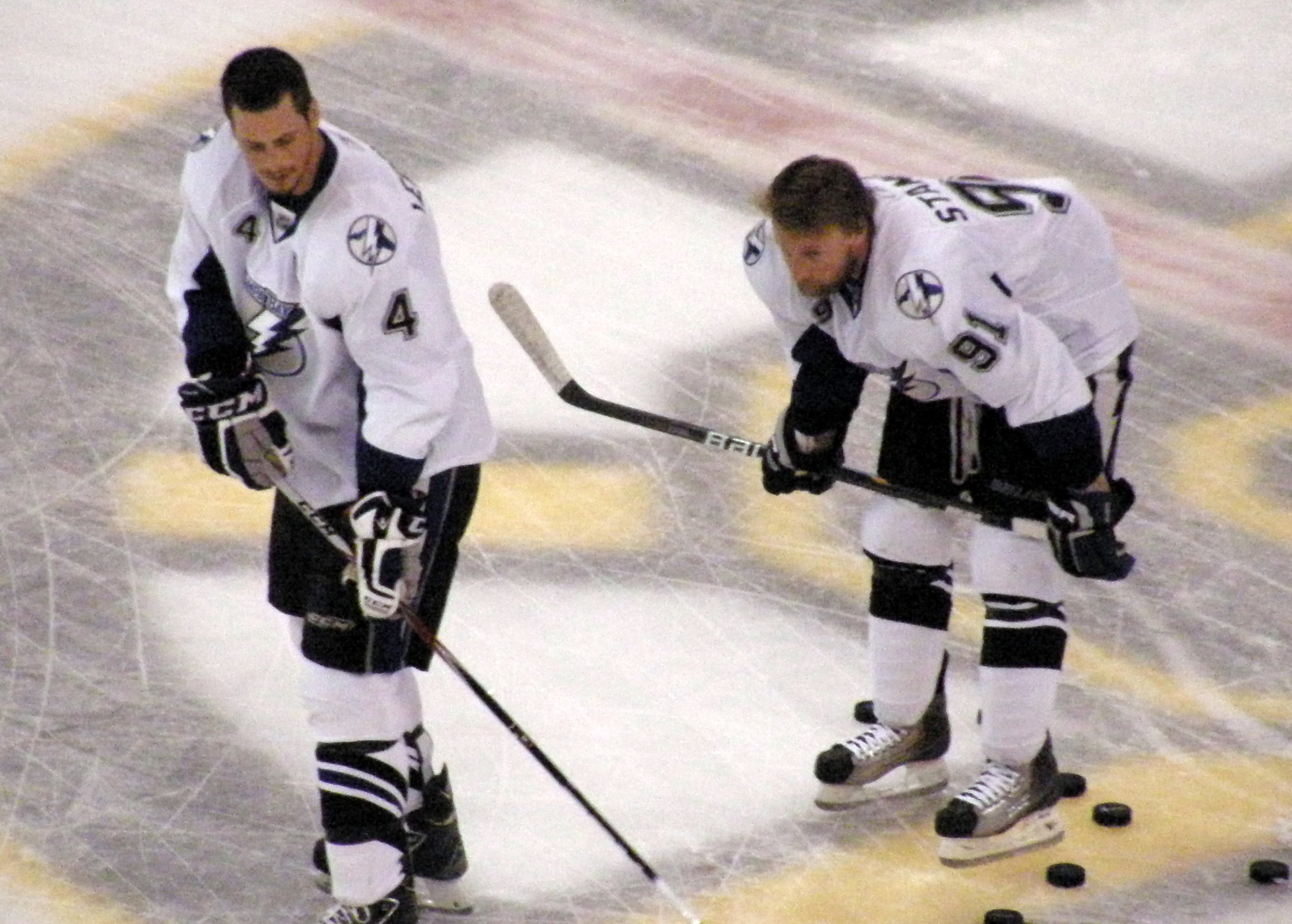
Stamkos (right) with Vincent Lecavalier in May 2011 during the Eastern Conference Final of the 2011 Stanley Cup playoffs.

Stamkos began the 2010–11 season with nine goals and 10 assists for 19 points in the first 10 games. This resulted in him being named the NHL’s first star of the month for the month of October. Following his high-scoring start to the season in which he scored 19 goals (along with 15 assists for 34 points) in his first 19 games, Stamkos began to attract media attention for challenging the elite "50 goals in 50 games" standard. Wayne Gretzky, who scored 50 goals in a record 39 games in 1981–82, told reporters he thought Stamkos was surrounded by enough talent in Tampa Bay to achieve the feat. Gretzky also followed up by saying on Stamkos' individual playing style by saying "He's got tremendous speed and such a quick release. He understands the game and goes into the holes and gets into the right areas." On December 20, 2010, Stamkos scored his 26th goal of the season and the 100th of his career, leading the Lightning past the Carolina Hurricanes 5–1. Stamkos had one of three Lightning goals late in the second period that put Tampa Bay ahead 5–1. The centre's milestone goal came in his 194th NHL game. Stamkos became the sixth player in history (joining Wayne Gretzky, Dale Hawerchuk, Ilya Kovalchuk, Jimmy Carson and Brian Bellows) to record his first 100 goals before turning the age of 21. In January 2011, Stamkos was named by the NHL to play in the NHL All-Star Game for the first time in his career. Stamkos was drafted second overall by Team Lidstrom, joining teammate Martin St. Louis on the squad. On February 8, 2011, Stamkos recorded his 100th career assist on a goal by Vincent Lecavalier in a 7–4 loss to the Buffalo Sabres. As the season progressed it became apparent Stamkos would not achieve the 50-in-50 mark. By the 57th game, he had recorded an NHL-leading 40 goals as well as 34 assists for 74 points. Stamkos' latter portion of the season was markedly less successful; he recorded just five more goals and 12 assists for 17 points in the last 25 games. Finishing the 2010–11 season with 45 goals, he ranked second in NHL scoring, only behind Corey Perry of the Anaheim Ducks. He also recorded 46 assists for a new career high in assists and 91 points and maintained durability by having played in all 82 games for the second consecutive season. His 91 points placed him fifth in the NHL for the second consecutive season behind Daniel Sedin, linemate Martin St. Louis, Corey Perry and Henrik Sedin, respectively. Stamkos was named a finalist for the Ted Lindsay Award as the most outstanding player in the regular season as judged by the members of the NHL Players' Association alongside Anaheim Ducks' forward Corey Perry and Vancouver Canucks forward Daniel Sedin, which was eventually won by Daniel Sedin. As the Lightning ranked fifth in the Eastern Conference and eighth in the NHL overall to qualify for the playoffs for the first time since 2007, Stamkos made his Stanley Cup playoff debut on April 13, 2011, against the Pittsburgh Penguins. On April 23, he scored his first two career playoff goals, as well an assist on a Vincent Lecavalier goal, in an 8–2 victory over the Penguins in game five for his first career three-point playoff game. The Lightning overcame a 3–1 series deficit and defeated the fourth-seeded Penguins in seven games and advanced to the second round for the first time since the teams Stanley Cup championship run in 2004 (four years before Stamkos was selected by the team and made his NHL debut) and swept the top-seeded Washington Capitals and eventually clinched a spot in the Eastern Conference Final against the Boston Bruins. In Game two on May 17, Stamkos recorded his second three-point playoff game scoring a goal on Bruins' goaltender Tim Thomas and recording two assists on goals by Martin St. Louis and Vincent Lecavalier, respectively. Despite this, the Lighting would lose the game 6–5. In game six on May 25, with the Lightning with a 3–2 series deficit and on the brink of elimination, Stamkos would record his second three point game of the series and third in the playoffs and in his career altogether scoring a goal and adding two assists, both were on goals by Martin St. Louis as the Lightning would go on to win 5–4 to extend the series to a seventh game. During the deciding game seven on May 27, Stamkos took a slapshot from Bruins defenseman Johnny Boychuk to the face; the impact broke his nose and bloodied his face, forcing him to momentarily leave the game, though he eventually returned wearing a full-caged mask. The Lightning went on to lose the game 1–0 against the third-seeded and eventual Stanley Cup champion Bruins with Bruins forward Nathan Horton scoring the loan goal in the game to lose the series 4–3, eliminating them from the 2011 playoffs, one win short from reaching the Stanley Cup Final. Stamkos ended the playoffs scoring below his regular season pace with 13 points (six goals, seven assists) over all 18 games played during his first playoff year, ranking fifth in team-scoring. Days after the Lightning's elimination from the playoffs, it was revealed that in addition to his broken nose in the seventh game of the third round against the Bruins, Stamkos was playing through a nagging shoulder injury that he initially sustained in the first round against the Penguins.

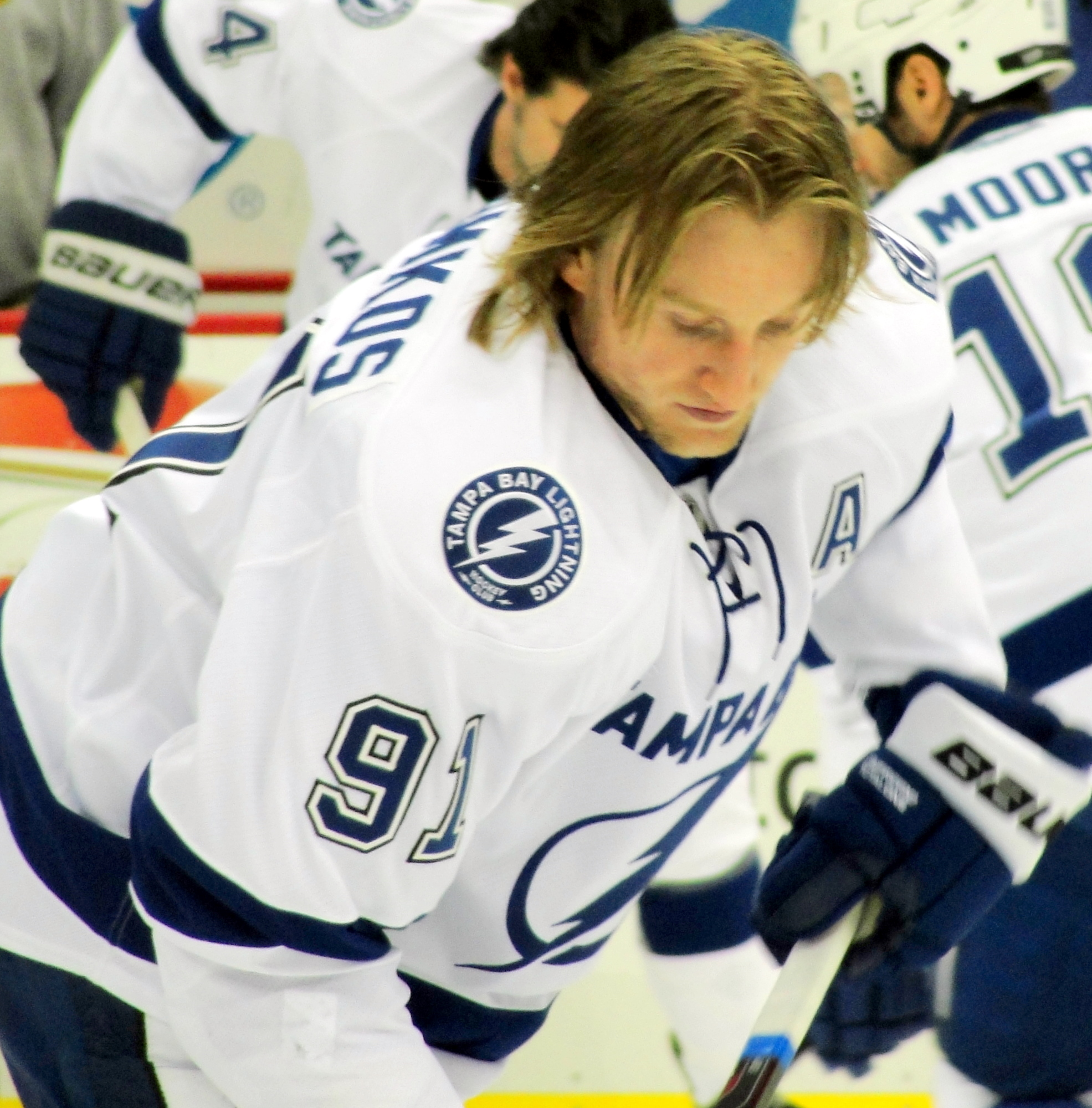
Stamkos as an alternate captain with the Tampa Bay Lightning in February 2012.

During the 2011 off-season on July 1, 2011, Stamkos became a restricted free agent. 18 days later on July 19, he re-signed with Tampa Bay on a five-year, $37.5 million contract. Stamkos was also named alternate captain by the Lightning on September 23, two weeks before the start of the 2011–12 season. Lightning head coach Guy Boucher quoted Stamkos’ role by saying, “Leaders aren't born; they are made, and you need courage. He has to be a leader and we know it. He wants it. The 2011 playoffs showed that he was ready and he's earned it." On March 13, 2012, Stamkos scored his 50th goal of the season in a 6–1 win over the Boston Bruins on Bruins' goaltender Marty Turco. In so doing, he became the sixth player in NHL history to record more than one 50-goal season before his 23rd birthday. He then scored his 53rd goal on March 26 against the Philadelphia Flyers on goaltender Ilya Bryzgalov, breaking Vincent Lecavalier's team record for goals in a season, set in 2006–07. Five days later, Stamkos set an NHL record by scoring his fifth overtime goal of the regular season, beating Winnipeg Jets goaltender Ondřej Pavelec from the left circle, Stamkos' "trademark" shot during his first three seasons prior similar to Washington Capitals forward and captain Alexander Ovechkin. On April 7, the final day of the 2011–12 season, Stamkos recorded his 60th goal in a 4–3 overtime win against the Winnipeg Jets, becoming the 20th player in NHL history to achieve the feat and the first since Alexander Ovechkin did so in 2007–08. His 60 goals led to him being awarded his second Rocket Richard Trophy as the NHL's leading goal scorer. Despite Stamkos' continued individual success, the Lightning struggled as a team, finishing the season eight points out of a spot for the playoffs, putting them at tenth in the East and twenty first in the NHL overall. In addition, Stamkos also holds the distinction of being the only player to have scored 60 or more goals in an NHL season during the 2010s decade, placing him among a distinguished group of NHL players who have achieved this rare feat in the salary cap era (following the 2004–05 lockout). Adding to his 60 goals, Stamkos also recorded 37 assists for a career high 97 points and played in all 82 games for the third consecutive season. His 97 points ranked second in the NHL as the runner-up for the Art Ross Trophy, 12 behind Pittsburgh Penguins forward Evgeni Malkin. He ranked first overall in the league in even strength goals with 48 of his 60 goals coming at even strength (the most even strength goals in a season since Teemu Selänne and Alexander Mogilny in 1992–93) and also tying Phoenix Coyotes forward Radim Vrbata in game-winning goals as 12 of his Stamkos' 60 total goals and 17 of Vrbata's 35 total goals were game-winners for their respective teams. Despite playing every game for the third season in a row, it was revealed that Stamkos played the final month of the season with an irritated bursa sac in his shoulder. For the first time in his career, Stamkos was a finalist for the Hart Memorial Trophy as the NHL's most valuable player the regular season along with and Malkin and New York Rangers goaltender Henrik Lundqvist, making Stamkos the first player since Calgary Flames winger Jarome Iginla in 2002 to become a top three finalist for the Hart Trophy despite being on a non-playoff team. The award would eventually be awarded to Malkin with Stamkos finishing second in the voting. Stamkos was also a finalist for the Ted Lindsay Award for the second straight season and second time in his career altogether along with Malkin and Lundqvist (which also went to Malkin), finishing second in that award as well.

During the 2012 NHL lockout, Stamkos trained with a handful of other NHL players at Gary Roberts' training academy in Ontario. The lockout also gave Stamkos an opportunity to do things in his hometown of Toronto he normally would not get to do during an NHL season. That included playing in his father's pick-up hockey league every Thursday night, when he and former Lightning forward Steve Downie would mix it up with a group that varied as much in age (22–65) as ability. In January 2013, right when the 2012–13 season began play after a three month delay and was abbreviated to 48 games over the normal 82 game schedule due to the lockout, Stamkos said when reflecting on playing in his father’s pick-up league, "It was a blast, those guys loved it they don't get a chance to play with NHL guys very often." He added, "It was a lot of fun and something I'll cherish forever." On March 1, 2013, nearly two months after play started for the shortened season, Stamkos was named the NHL's First Star of the Month for February. He joined Pittsburgh forward and captain Sidney Crosby and Chicago goaltender Ray Emery, who ranked as the Second and Third Stars, respectively. Stamkos had a season-high six-game goal streak and six multi-point outings, and recorded at least one point in 11 of 14 games for February 2013, with 10 goals and assists for 20 points within the 14 games played through the entire month. He ended the month of February on an eight-game point streak between February 14–28 (seven goals and seven assists for 14 points). On March 18, Stamkos scored his 200th career goal on Philadelphia Flyers' goaltender Ilya Bryzgalov as he the Lightning would eventually collect a 4–2 victory over the Flyers. Stamkos finished the season playing in all 48 games with 29 goals, ranking him second in the NHL behind Alexander Ovechkin's NHL-leading 32. He also had 28 assists, which gave him a total of 57 points for the runner-up for the Art Ross Trophy for the second straight season behind teammate and linemate Martin St. Louis. Despite the continuation of his individual dominance, the Lightning still continued to struggle heavily as a team as they finished second-to-last in the league.

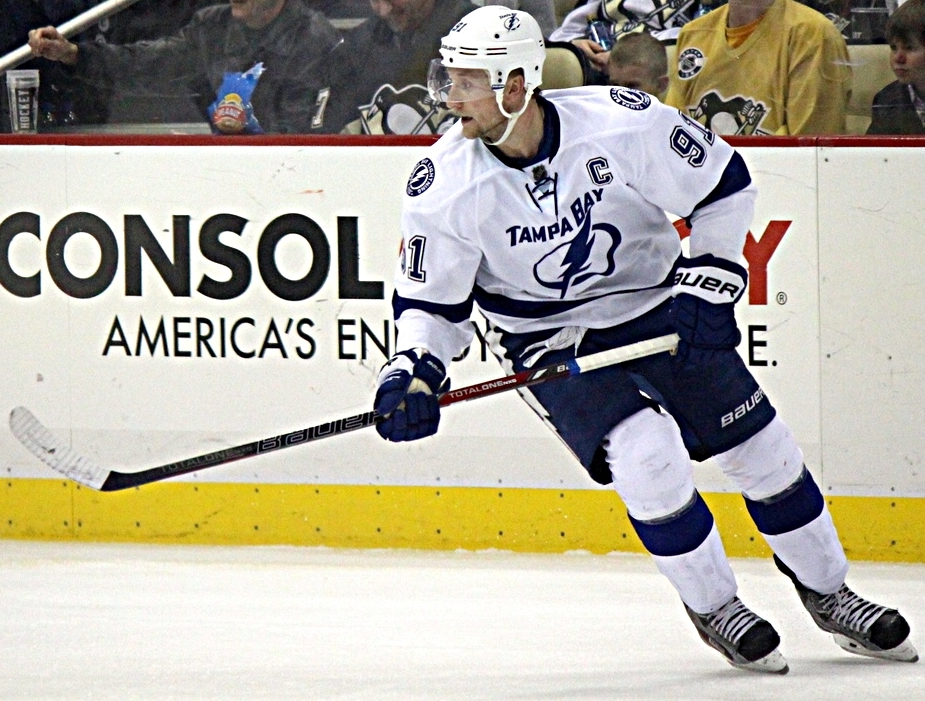
Stamkos as captain of the Lightning in March 2014.

On November 11, 2013, 17 games into the 2013–14 season, Stamkos suffered a broken tibia in a game against the Boston Bruins at TD Garden. He was backchecking on a play late in the second period when he was tied up with Boston defenceman Dougie Hamilton. His left skate appeared to hit the post first before his right leg slid into it around the shin area. He tried to get up twice before going down to the ice in agony, grabbing his leg just above the ankle with the training staff along with teammates Martin St. Louis, Alex Killorn, Victor Hedman, Sami Salo and Ryan Malone (who were on the ice with Stamkos when he slid into the net) rushing to his side. After a brief delay, a stretcher was brought out by the trainers and he was taken off the ice to a loud applause from the audience and the rest of his teammates and the Lightning coaches looking on. He was taken to Massachusetts General Hospital. Stamkos entered the day with 14 goals and nine assists for 23 points in the first 17 games of the season. His 14 goals tied for the NHL's lead in goal scoring with St. Louis Blues forward Alexander Steen and his 23 points tied with Pittsburgh Penguins forward and captain Sidney Crosby for league-leading point scorer. He also entered the day on an iron man streak of 344 consecutive games played (having last missed a game on January 29, 2009, where he was a healthy scratch against the Carolina Hurricanes). The next day, Stamkos underwent successful surgery in Boston to stabilize the fracture in his right tibia and he began rehabilitation immediately. On November 25, prior to the Lightning's upcoming game against the New York Rangers, Stamkos made a press appearance to the media where he was seen walking without the use of crutches or a walking boot. He updated the media on his miraculous progress and was hopeful that he could return to the Lightning before commencement of the 2014 Winter Olympics in Sochi, which he was widely considered to play in for Canada. Ultimately, he was unable to recover in time to participate in the Olympics. After missing 45 games and the Olympics, Stamkos was cleared to play for the Lightning on March 5, 2014, the same day former teammate and linemate Martin St. Louis was traded to the New York Rangers – and returned the next day, in a game against the Buffalo Sabres, which the team lost 3–1. Stamkos was named the new captain of the Lightning before the game, replacing the departed St. Louis. Lightning head coach Jon Cooper stated that Stamkos was "destined to be our leader" and his leadership puts the Lightning "one step closer to achieving our ultimate goal in winning a Stanley Cup." He finished the injury-shortened season playing in 37 games with 25 goals, 15 assists and 40 points. Despite his lengthy absence during the season, the Lightning as a team qualified for the playoffs for the first time in three years as the team would finish third in the East. The Lightning, however, would be upset in the opening round of the 2014 playoffs as they were swept by sixth-seeded Montreal Canadiens. Stamkos would finish the playoffs with two goals and assists for four points in all four games played. He was the Lightning's nominee for the Bill Masterton Memorial Trophy as the player who shows best qualities of perseverance, sportsmanship, and dedication to the game of ice hockey although Stamkos was left out of the three finalists selected by the Professional Hockey Writers' Association.

On November 11, 2014, Stamkos recorded his 200th career NHL assist on a goal scored by Nikita Kucherov in a Lightning 3–2 shootout loss to the Chicago Blackhawks at United Center. Stamkos finished the 2014–15 season playing in all 82 games and recording 43 goals, 29 assists and 72 points. His 43 goals were once again second overall in the league only behind Washington Capitals forward and captain Alexander Ovechkin who had 53 goals. On May 24, 2015, during game five of the Eastern Conference Final of the 2015 playoffs against the Presidents' Trophy-winning New York Rangers, Stamkos scored a goal in a 2–0 Lightning victory over the Rangers on goaltender Henrik Lundqvist, tying him with the Lightning playoff record for goals in consecutive games (four). After the Lightning defeated the Rangers in seven games, Stamkos and the Lightning would move on to the Stanley Cup Final where they were defeated in six games by the Chicago Blackhawks. Stamkos finished the playoffs with seven goals and 11 assists for 18 points and playing in all 26 games. After the playoffs ended, Lightning general manager Steve Yzerman revealed that Stamkos played through an undisclosed injury during the Finals.

On October 12, 2015, Stamkos recorded his 500th career NHL point off a power-play goal against Boston Bruins goaltender Tuukka Rask. The Lightning would go on to win the game 6–3. With his 500th career point, Stamkos became the third player in Lightning history to record over 500 points. He joined both Martin St. Louis (953) and Vincent Lecavalier (874) as the only players to do so. On October 23, Stamkos played in his 500th career NHL game in a 4–3 overtime Lightning victory over the Winnipeg Jets. On November 1, Stamkos moved into second place for the most power-play goals in Lightning history with 97. Stamkos moved from a tie with former teammate Martin St. Louis, who had 96 power-play goals in his time with the Lightning On January 6, 2016, Stamkos was selected to his fourth All-Star Game, joining teammate Ben Bishop. On February 20, Stamkos scored his 300th career NHL goal, which came in a 4–2 Lightning win over the Pittsburgh Penguins. Stamkos became the third Lightning player in franchise history to record 300 goals, joining Vincent Lecavalier (383) and Martin St. Louis (365). During a post-game interview, Stamkos said of his feat, "[F]irst of all, it means you've been around for a while and secondly, I've been fortunate to play with a lot of good players. I've been able to be put in positions to score goals and obviously it was special coming in a big win for our team." On February 26, Stamkos played in his 553 game in Lightning history, which came in a 4–0 win over the New Jersey Devils. With the game, Stamkos surpassed Brad Richards (552) for fourth all-time in games played for the Lightning. On February 28, Stamkos recorded his 245 career assist as a member of the Lightning in a 4–1 over the Boston Bruins on a goal by Ryan Callahan. The assist moved Stamkos past Václav Prospal (244) to become fourth all-time in assists with the Lightning. On April 2, after the first 77 games of the season, the Lightning announced Stamkos was diagnosed with thoracic outlet syndrome, the same injury that sidelined teammate Andrei Vasilevskiy at the start of the 2015–16 season; it is a condition that is rare among hockey players. Stamkos said he first felt some discomfort in his arm after the game against the Montreal Canadiens on March 31. He was scheduled for surgery on the following Monday with Dr. Karl Illig, who performed Vasilevskiy's surgery. Lightning general manager Steve Yzerman said there would be no long-term impact on Stamkos' health or his career. In addition, Yzerman indicated Stamkos recovery time would be between one and three months, but the club would have a better idea in a couple of weeks where he falls within that time frame. Yzerman also said the team's desire is for Stamkos to remain with the organization, which came after a question of whether Stamkos had played his last game in a Lightning uniform. On April 4, Stamkos had successful surgery at Tampa General Hospital. Stamkos' surgeon said they plan on evaluating him in approximately two weeks and that should clear up his prognosis. In the first 77 games played for the 2015–16 season, Stamkos recorded 36 goals, 28 assists and 64 points, ranking first in goals, third in assists and second in points for the team. After missing the final five games of the season, the first two rounds of the 2016 playoffs against the Detroit Red Wings and New York Islanders and first six games of the Eastern Conference Finals against the Pittsburgh Penguins, Stamkos dressed for Game 7 of the Eastern Conference Finals against the Penguins on May 27, despite still being on blood thinners following surgery. He registered five shot attempts during the game, but the Lightning lost the game 2–1 for a 4–3 defeat in the series resulting in their elimination from the playoffs, falling one win short from a second consecutive appearance in the Stanley Cup Final and surrendering a 3–2 series lead in doing so.

On June 29, 2016, two days before Stamkos was set to become an unrestricted free agent, the Lightning signed him to an eight-year, $68 million contract extension with an annual average value of $8.5 million. General manager Steve Yzerman said of the signing, "[W]e are very appreciative of the effort and commitment that Steven and his representatives have exhibited in getting a deal done." He continued, "We are excited to have him as a cornerstone part of the team for the next eight years as we continue in the franchise's ultimate goal of winning another Stanley Cup." On November 15, 17 games into the 2016–17 season in a game against the Detroit Red Wings at Joe Louis Arena, Stamkos fell after getting tangled up with Red Wings forward Gustav Nyquist causing him to leave the game in pain and it was revealed afterwards by the Lightning that he had sustained a torn lateral meniscus in his right knee on the play. Steve Yzerman said there was no timetable for his return and that Stamkos would be out "indefinitely". Stamkos entered the day with 20 points (nine goals and 11 assists) in the first 17 games of the season (scoring twice in the game against the Red Wings before his injury as the Lightning would go on to win 4–3 after his exit from the game). His 20 points tied Dallas Stars’ forward Tyler Seguin for third in the NHL (only behind Winnipeg Jets forward Mark Scheifele and linemate Nikita Kucherov). On November 17, Stamkos headed to Vail, Colorado, to undergo arthroscopic knee surgery to repair the injury. The procedure he underwent was estimated to have a four-month recovery window, which would keep Stamkos out of the lineup until at least mid-March. This would translate into Stamkos missing at least 50 games. Later in the day, the Lightning announced Stamkos underwent surgery that day. As predicted, Stamkos was expected to miss approximately four months. On February 20, 2017, Yzerman provided an update on Stamkos' rehabilitation progress. Yzerman said that Stamkos had begun light skating, and is progressing well. Yzerman further stated that the timeline was still four to six months for his recovery. Stamkos would be approaching the four-month recovery window in mid-March. If Stamkos needs the full six months, he would be out for the remainder of the season. On March 29, Lightning head coach, Jon Cooper, said that after the team's upcoming game against the Detroit Red Wings that Stamkos would be considered day-to-day. Stamkos said that he was not going to put any dates on his return, however, he did say that he was very pleased and excited with how his knee was feeling. Stamkos ultimately did not return to the lineup for the Lightning that season and the Lightning finished 10th in the East and missed the 2017 playoffs by just one point in the standings, marking the first time since 2013 where the team failed to qualify for the playoffs. Despite the Lightning narrowly missing the playoffs and Stamkos not returning to the lineup before the season ended, his effort in trying to return to the Lightning lineup before the season ended resulted in him for being the Lightning's nominee for the Bill Masterton Memorial Trophy for the second time in his career but was left out of the three finalists selected by the Professional Hockey Writers' Association.

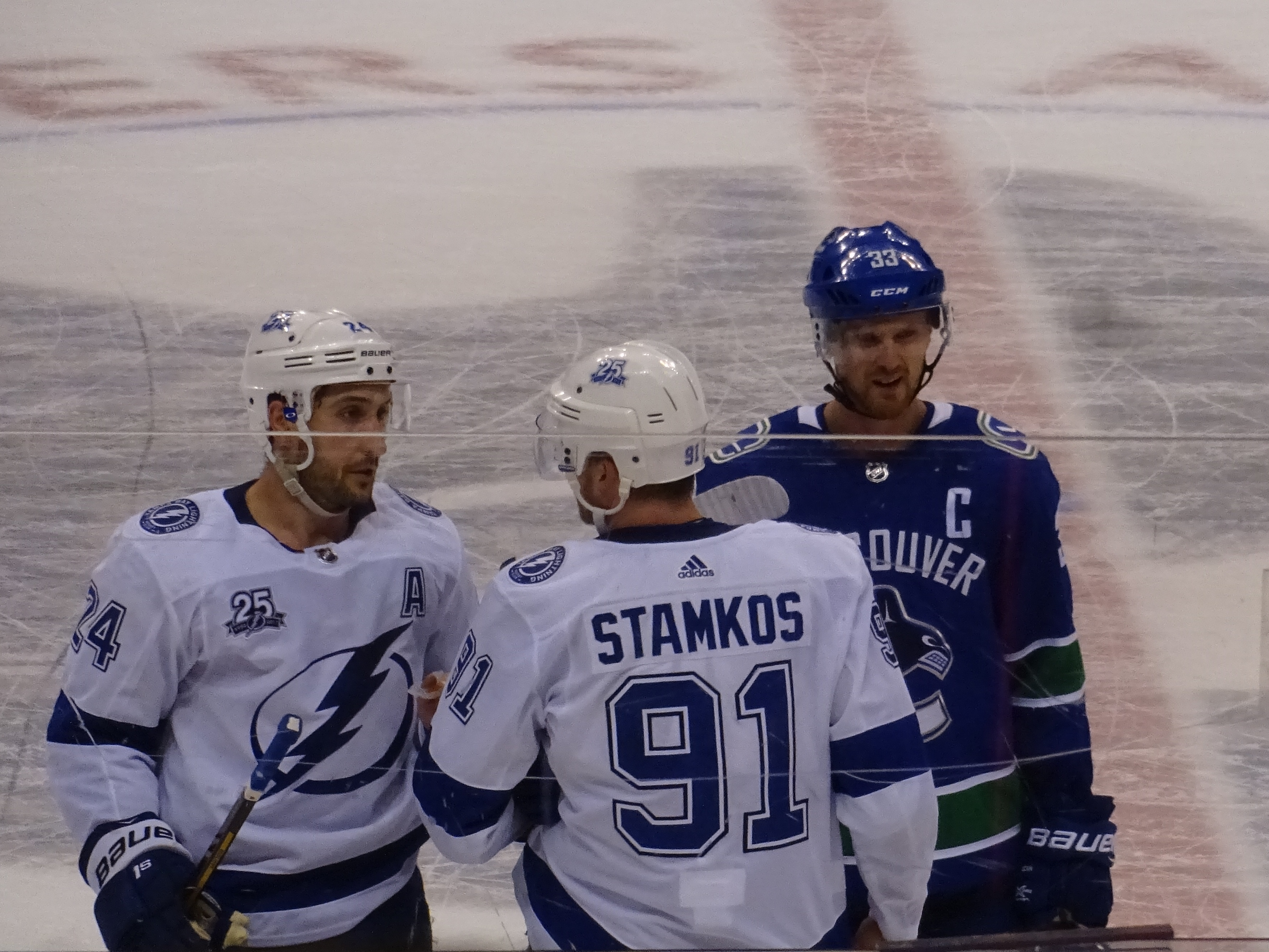
Stamkos with Ryan Callahan (left) and Henrik Sedin (right) during a game in February 2018.

On October 6, 2017, in the 2017–18 season opener, Stamkos played in his first game since injuring his knee early into the prior season in November 2016. Stamkos recorded two assists in his return on goals by Nikita Kucherov and Vladislav Namestnikov respectively, which resulted in a 5–3 Lightning win over the visiting Florida Panthers. On October 12, Stamkos scored his 112th power play goal, which tied him with Vincent Lecavalier for the most power play goals in franchise history. On October 21, Stamkos scored his 113th career power play goal, against Antti Niemi of the Pittsburgh Penguins in a 7–1 Lightning win at the Amalie Arena. The goal moved Stamkos past Lecavalier for most power play goals in franchise history. During that game, Stamkos also recorded his 600th career NHL point with an assist on a goal by Mikhail Sergachev. On October 26, Stamkos recorded a point in his 11th consecutive game to start the season as he scored a goal in a 3–2 win over the Detroit Red Wings on Red Wings goaltender Jimmy Howard. Within the first 11 games of the season, Stamkos had recorded four goals and a league-leading 17 assists and 21 points. Linemate Nikita Kucherov also opened the first 11 games of the season with at least a point (12 goals and seven assists for 19 points). This game and streak would result in both Stamkos and Kucherov tying Martin St. Louis for the longest season-opening point streak in Lightning history. Stamkos' streak ended the following game in a 4–1 loss against the Anaheim Ducks. Stamkos was named the NHL’s first start of the month for the month of October as he recorded six goals and a league-leading 18 assists and 24 points in the first 14 games. On November 2, Stamkos skated in his 600th career NHL game against the New York Rangers. The following day, Stamkos was fined $5,000 for unsportsmanlike conduct after spraying his water bottle at a referee during the previous night's game. On November 17, Stamkos scored four points in a 6–1 Lightning win over the Dallas Stars scoring two goals on Stars goaltender and former Lightning teammate Ben Bishop and recording two assists on goals scored by Nikita Kucherov and Jake Dotchin. This was Stamkos' fourth four-point game, which tied Stamkos with Martin St. Louis and Vincent Lecavalier for the most four-point games in Lightning history. On January 3, 2018, Stamkos was voted by fans to be the Atlantic Division captain at the 2018 National Hockey League All-Star Game, which was held at the Lightning's home arena, Amalie Arena. This was Stamkos' fifth NHL All-Star Game appearance, which moved him past Vincent Lecavalier for second most NHL All-Star Game appearances by a Lightning player. On January 25, Stamkos recorded his 300th career NHL assist on a goal by Vladislav Namestnikov. The milestone came in a 5–1 Lightning victory over the Philadelphia Flyers away at Wells Fargo Center. On February 8, Stamkos recorded his 20th goal of the season, which came in a 5–2 win over the Vancouver Canucks. This was Stamkos' ninth 20-goal season of his career and in franchise history, which tied him with Martin St. Louis for second-most such seasons in franchise history. On March 3, Stamkos set a new career high with a five-point game in a 7–6 Lightning shootout win over the visiting Philadelphia Flyers. With two goals scored on Flyers' goaltender Petr Mrázek and three assists on two goals by Victor Hedman and one goal by Dan Girardi for his five-point game, Stamkos became the seventh Lightning player in franchise history to score five points in one game. The five-point game also gave Stamkos the most career regular season games scoring at least four points in franchise history, with 11. On March 21, Stamkos was fined $5,000 for a dangerous trip against Toronto Maple Leafs' defenceman Morgan Rielly, which occurred the previous night at Amalie Arena. On March 30, Stamkos appeared in his 66third career NHL game, which moved him past Pavel Kubina for third-most games played in Lightning history. On April 1, in a 4–1 loss to the Nashville Predators, Stamkos sustained an undisclosed lower-body injury after getting tangled up with Predators forward Austin Watson, causing him to miss the final three games of the season. He ended the 2017–18 season playing in 78 games with 27 goals, 59 assists and 86 points recorded and a plus/minus rating of +18 as the Lightning finished as the top seed in the East and returning to the playoffs after a one year absence the year prior. His 59 assists and +18 rating were career highs. His 86 points ranked second on the Lightning and 12th in the league overall. Stamkos also ended the season as the team leader in penalty minutes (72). Stamkos' healthy 2017–18 campaign saw him be named as the Lightning's nominee for the Bill Masterton Memorial Trophy for the second straight season and third time in his career altogether, although he wasn't named a top three finalist by the NHL. In the 2018 playoffs, Stamkos and the Lightning would go on another lengthy run as they beat the eighth-seeded New Jersey Devils in five games in the first round and the third-seeded Boston Bruins in five games in the second round to reach the Eastern Conference Final for the third time in four seasons and third time among Stamkos' captaincy and fourth time in Stamkos' tenure with the team altogether. On May 17, during game four of the third round series, Stamkos recorded his 11th career playoff power-play goal in a 4–2 Lightning win over the Washington Capitals at Capital One Arena against Capitals goaltender Braden Holtby to even the series at two wins apiece. The goal moved Stamkos past Martin St. Louis for most playoff power-play goals in franchise history. The Lightning would eventually go on to lose the series against the second-seeded and eventual Stanley Cup champion Capitals in seven games, coming one win short from the Stanley Cup Final and surrendering a 3–2 series lead in the process once more. Stamkos ended the playoffs with seven goals and nine assists for 16 points in all 17 games played.

On October 18, 2018, Stamkos recorded his 50th career game-winning goal in a 3–1 Lightning victory over the visiting Detroit Red Wings, coming on Red Wings goaltender Jimmy Howard. In so doing, Stamkos became the third player in franchise history to record at least 50 game-winning goals, joining Vincent Lecavalier (60) and Martin St. Louis (64). On December 10, Stamkos scored a power play goal on New York Rangers goaltender Henrik Lundqvist to record his 700th career NHL point. He became the third player in franchise history to reach 700 career points. Stamkos was also the first player from the 2008 NHL Entry Draft to record 700 career points. That same night, Stamkos also recorded his ninth career NHL hat-trick, in so doing also surpassing Martin St. Louis (eight) for most hat-tricks in Lightning history. Stamkos' record breaking night helped the Lightning beat the visiting New York Rangers 6–3. On December 20, Stamkos played in his 700th career NHL game. He scored in the second period of that game, which moved him past Martin St. Louis for second-most goals in franchise history with 366. The goal came in a 5–4 shootout road win against the Calgary Flames at the Scotiabank Saddledome. On December 22, Stamkos recorded two goals for his 20th goal of the season in a 6–3 win over the Edmonton Oilers for his tenth season with at least 20 goals to surpass Martin St. Louis for most seasons with 20 or more goals in franchise history. For December 2018, Stamkos set the Lightning record for most goals in a single calendar month with 14. On January 2, 2019, Stamkos was named to the 2019 NHL All-Star Game, his sixth All-Star selection, tying him with Martin St. Louis for the most in Lightning history. On March 18, Stamkos scored the 384th goal of his career against the Arizona Coyotes to break the Lighting team record previously held by Vincent Lecavalier for most regular season goals. Lecavalier said after the game "All the adversity, scoring all over the ice - and still managing to set the record in a relatively small number of games is remarkable and further establishes Stammer as one of the top goal-scorers in the game. It's an honor to call him a friend and a teammate." On March 25, Stamkos recorded his fifth 40-goal season and his fourth 90-point season against the Boston Bruins. Stamkos tied St. Louis for the most 90-point seasons in Lightning history. On April 4, Stamkos recorded a goal against Toronto Maple Leafs goaltender Frederik Andersen and an assist on a goal by Alex Killorn giving him 97 points on the year to match his highest point total in a single season. The goal also established a new franchise record for most consecutive road games with a goal (7). In the season finale on April 6, Stamkos recorded a short-handed goal against Boston Bruins goaltender Tuukka Rask to extend his road goal record to eight games and also set a new career high in points with his 98th point. Stamkos finished the 2018–19 season playing in all 82 contests and recording 45 goals, 53 assists and a career high 98 points, two points short of his first career 100-point season as the Lightning would go onto win their first Presidents' Trophy as the regular season champions. His 45 goals lead his team in goals and 53 assists and 98 points for second on his team. His 45 goals also was good enough for fourth in the NHL overall only behind Toronto Maple Leafs forward John Tavares, who completed with 47 goals, Edmonton Oilers forward Leon Draisaitl, who ended with 50 goals and Washington Capitals forward and captain Alexander Ovechkin, who recorded a league-leading 51 goals. His 98 points ranked second on the Lightning and ninth in the league overall. Despite the continued dominance for both Stamkos individually and the Lightning as a team, Stamkos and the Lightning would unexpectedly get swept in the first round of the 2019 playoffs by the eighth-seeded Columbus Blue Jackets. During the series, Stamkos recorded two points (a goal and an assist) in all four contests played.

On November 16, 2019, Stamkos recorded his 400th career NHL goal in a 4–3 loss to the Winnipeg Jets at Amalie Arena. Stamkos became the first player in Lightning history to score 400 goals with the franchise. On December 7, Stamkos recorded his 150th and 151st NHL power-play goal in a 7–1 Lightning win over the visiting San Jose Sharks at Amalie Arena. In doing so, Stamkos became the fourth player in NHL history that played primarily as a center to record 150+ career power-play goals before the age of 30, joining Wayne Gretzky, Mario Lemieux and Dale Hawerchuk. On December 28, Stamkos recorded his 800th career NHL point by scoring a goal on Carey Price of the Montreal Canadiens. Stamkos became the third player in Lightning history to record 800 points with the franchise. On January 9, 2020, Stamkos recorded his 400th career NHL assist on a Nikita Kucherov goal against the Arizona Coyotes, becoming the third player in Lightning history to reach the milestone. On January 24, Stamkos was named to the NHL's 2010s All-Decade Second Team. In that decade (from January 1, 2010 until December 31, 2019), Stamkos recorded 719 points in 662 games, which was the fifth most in the decade only behind Patrick Kane (802), Sidney Crosby (788), Alexander Ovechkin (780) and Claude Giroux (737), respectively. He also scored the second most goals in the decade with 363 in that timeframe, only behind the 437 scored by Alexander Ovechkin. On February 4, Stamkos recorded his 61st game-winning goal of his career against Vegas Golden Knights goaltender Marc-Andre Fleury. The goal moved him past Vincent Lecavalier for second most game-winning goals in Lightning history. On February 17, Stamkos skated in his 800th career NHL game against the Colorado Avalanche. Stamkos joined St. Louis and Lecavalier as the only players in franchise history to play in 800 career games. On February 29, Stamkos had surgery to repair a core muscle. Stamkos recovery was projected at six to eight weeks from the procedure, which caused him to miss the remainder of the regular season. Up to that point in the 2019–20 season, he had played in 57 games and recorded 29 goals and 37 assists adding up to 66 points. The last 12 games of the season would eventually get canceled two weeks later and the playoffs would get postponed to the summer due to the COVID-19 pandemic. In Stamkos' absence, the Lightning would defeat the Columbus Blue Jackets in five games in the first round of the 2020 playoffs followed by the Presidents' Trophy-winning Boston Bruins in five games and New York Islanders in six games to reach the Stanley Cup Final for the first time since 2015. On September 23, Stamkos returned to the Lightning lineup in the third game of the Finals where he scored on his first (and only) shot of the game on Dallas Stars goaltender Anton Khudobin. Stamkos' goal was the second time in NHL history that a player skating in their first game of the playoffs in the Stanley Cup Final scored a goal, the previous being Billy Taylor Sr. in 1940. Lightning defenceman Victor Hedman, who recorded an assist on his goal, described Stamkos' goal as the "best three minutes of playoff hockey you'll ever see" as Stamkos logged just shy of three minutes of ice time as he had a total of 2:47 of ice time exactly during the game which would be his only game of the series and in the 2020 playoffs altogether. The Lightning would go on to win the series in six games against the Stars, marking Stamkos' first Stanley Cup championship.

After playing 38 games in the pandemic-shortened 2020–21 campaign and recording 17 goals and assists for 34 points, it was announced on April 8, 2021, that Stamkos sustained an undisclosed lower-body injury in a 6–4 victory over the Columbus Blue Jackets, resulting in him missing the final 16 games of the abbreviated season. After the season ended, Stamkos and the Lightning would go on to repeat as Stanley Cup champions in 2021 with Stamkos playing in every playoff game this time. He finished the 2021 playoffs with eight goals and 10 assists for 18 points in all 23 contests played. Stamkos was also named the Lightning's nominee for the Bill Masterton Memorial Trophy for the fourth time in his career but wasn't named a top three finalist by the NHL.

On April 26, 2022, in a game against the Columbus Blue Jackets which saw the Lightning win 4–1, Stamkos recorded his 100th point of the season on a second period goal. His 39th goal of the season on Elvis Merzlikins would make this be the first time he recorded 100 points in a season. In that game, he also became the first player since Jari Kurri in 1992–93 to record at least three points in at least five consecutive games. In the 2021–22 season finale against the New York Islanders on April 29, Stamkos recorded his 10th career hat-trick to bump his goal scoring total to 40, 41 and 42 in the season, which saw the Lightning win 6–4. This would mark the sixth time in his career where he recorded 40 or more goals. For April 2022, Stamkos recorded 33 points (12 goals and 21 assists) in all 16 games for the month, which surpassed Nikita Kucherov’s 30 points in December 2018 for a franchise record for most points in a single calendar month. His 33 points would also be the most points in a calendar month by an NHL player since Mario Lemieux’s 34 points in December 1995. Stamkos finished the 2021–22 season altogether recording 42 goals and 64 assists for 106 total points with a career-best +24 plus-minus rating in 81 games played. His 42 goals led the team for goal scoring and tied with Nashville Predators’ forward Filip Forsberg and Calgary Flames’ forwards Matthew Tkachuk and Elias Lindholm for ninth most goals in the league altogether. His 64 assists and 106 points recorded would be new individual career highs with his 64 assists being second most on the team (only behind the 65 Victor Hedman recorded) and ninth in the league overall. His 106 points also led the team in points as well and in a two-way tie with Toronto Maple Leafs’ forward Auston Matthews for sixth most points in the league overall. His +24 rating was third on the team only behind Victor Hedman's team-leading +26 rating and Jan Rutta’s +25 rating. 11 of the 42 goals Stamkos scored during the season were game-winners, tying Edmonton Oilers forward Leon Draisaitl, Dallas Stars forward Jason Robertson and New York Rangers forward Chris Kreider for league leaders in game-winning goals. In the 2022 playoffs, Stamkos and the Lightning would defeat the fourth-seeded Toronto Maple Leafs in seven games in the first round (erasing a 3–2 series deficit in doing so), the Presidents' Trophy-winning Florida Panthers in a four-game sweep to clinch a third consecutive appearance in the Eastern Conference Final (sixth appearance under his captaincy and seventh time in his tenure overall), where they defeated the third-seeded New York Rangers in six games to clinch a third consecutive appearance in the Stanley Cup Final (fourth altogether under his captaincy and tenure with the Lightning). On June 11, in game six of the third round, Stamkos scored both goals (including the series-winning goal) against Rangers goaltender Igor Shesterkin as the Lightning won the game two–1 to end the series in six. Going into the Finals, Stamkos was seen as a top candidate for the Conn Smythe Trophy as the playoff MVP if the Lightning were to win third consecutive Stanley Cup title. The Lightning, however, would go on to lose in six games to the top-seeded Colorado Avalanche. Stamkos finished the playoffs with 11 goals, eight assists and 19 points in all 23 games played.

The 2022–23 season would be full of milestones for Stamkos. On November 15, 2022, Stamkos recorded his 500th assist against the Dallas Stars on an OT goal scored by Alex Killorn. On December 1, Stamkos recorded his 1,000th point, assisting on a Nick Paul goal in a 4–1 win against the Philadelphia Flyers. He became the 95th player, the 14th first overall pick, and the first player in Lightning history to record 1,000 NHL points. On January 18, 2023, in a 5–2 win over the Vancouver Canucks, Stamkos became the first player in Lightning history to record 500 career goals, the third active player at the time and the 47th player ever to achieve the feat. He capped off the night with his 11th career hat-trick, becoming the eighth player in NHL history to do so. He said it was "a humbling experience when you have a moment like that." Lightning head coach Jon Cooper expressed elation for Stamkos' milestone by saying, "I have watched him grow into a man, a phenomonal leader and to be honest, a generational goal scorer. Those guys don't come around that often." On April 6, Stamkos played his 1,000th NHL game against the New York Islanders, becoming the second player from the Lightning to play all their games with the team, after Vincent Lecavalier. Stamkos ended the 2022–23 season with 34 goals, 50 assists and 84 points having played in 81 games as the Lightning as a team finished sixth in the East. Going into the 2023 playoffs against the Toronto Maple Leafs in the opening round of the for the second consecutive season and this time falling to the third-seeded Maple Leafs in six games, Stamkos would record two goals and assists for four points in all six games. On June 26, at the 2023 NHL Awards show, Stamkos was named the winner of the Mark Messier Leadership Award by former NHL player Mark Messier for contributions both on and off the ice. After being awarded the trophy, Stamkos went on to say "When you you have someone with the caliber of leadership that Mark Messier has and what he's meant to our game, it's pretty special to have him hand select the winner. I am very proud of everything we have been able to accomplish in Tampa".

On December 14, 2023, Stamkos recorded his first career four-goal game and 12th career hat-trick in a 7–4 win over the Edmonton Oilers. On December 31, Stamkos played his 1,038th NHL game (all with the Lightning) in a 4–3 win over the Montreal Canadiens and recorded an assist on a goal by Calvin de Haan. This game saw Stamkos pass Vincent Lecavalier for the most games played in Lightning history. On January 25, 2024, Stamkos recorded his 1,100th point in a 6–3 Lightning win against the Arizona Coyotes with an assist on a goal scored by Nikita Kucherov, becoming the first player in Lightning history and 66th player in NHL history to reach the mark. In a game against the Detroit Red Wings on April 1 in which the Lightning lost 4–2, Stamkos recorded his 211th power play goal against Red Wings goaltender Alex Lyon, passing Luc Robitaille for third most power play goals with one franchise. On April 9, Stamkos recorded his 13th career hat-trick in a 5–2 win over the Columbus Blue Jackets. On April 15, Stamkos recorded his 40th goal of the season in a 4–2 loss to the Buffalo Sabres for his seventh season with 40 goals or more. The season ended with Stamkos recording 40 goals, 41 assists for 81 points in 79 contests played. Despite his continued offensive consistency, he finished with a career-worst -21 plus-minus rating. Stamkos began the 2024 playoffs with five goals in the first four games in the opening round against the second-seeded and eventual Stanley Cup champion Florida Panthers including a two goal performance on April 27 in game four on Panthers goaltender Sergei Bobrovsky to become the fourth player in NHL history age 34 or older to record four straight goals (besides Gordie Howe in 1963, Rick Tocchet in 1998 and Teemu Selänne in 2011, respectively). Stamkos' first goal scored of the two he scored in the 6–3 win in game four was also his 100th career playoff point to make him the 57th player in league history to achieve the feat to help the Lightning prevent a sweep and extending the series to a fifth game. After recording six points (five goals and an assist) within the first four games, Stamkos would go pointless in game five as he and the Lightning would eventually go on to lose game five 6–1 for a 4–1 defeat in the series, eliminating the Lightning from the playoffs. Stamkos ended the series and the playoffs with five goals and an assist for six points in all five games played.

==== Nashville Predators (2024–present) ====
On July 1, 2024, Stamkos ended his 16-year tenure with the Lightning after being unable to negotiate an extension with the club and was signed as a free agent to a four-year, $32 million dollar contract with the Nashville Predators. On October 28, in the ninth game of the 2024–25 season, Stamkos made his first appearance at Amalie Arena as a visitor. During the first period of the game, Stamkos was given a standing ovation and was honored by the Lightning as the team presented a video tribute on the jumbotron capturing his tenure and Stamkos would take a solo lap around the ice to salute the fans. Stamkos would record his first two assists of the season as a Predator that game on goals by Ryan O'Reilly and Gustav Nyquist, respectively. Despite being no longer on the Lightning, Lightning fans cheered for both goals the Predators scored largely because of Stamkos recording assists on both of them. The Predators would eventually fall to the Lightning 3–2 in overtime. On March 4, 2025, Stamkos recorded his 600th career assist on a Ryan O'Reilly goal in a 6–3 win over the Boston Bruins. On March 8, Stamkos recorded his first hat trick as a Predator and the 14th of his career altogether as he scored all three goals in the Predators 3–2 OT win over the Chicago Blackhawks. Stamkos ultimately ended the season with 27 goals and 26 assists for 53 points ranking second on the team in goals, fourth in assists and fifth in points while also recording a career low -36 plus-minus rating. His 53 points was the lowest in a full season since his rookie season. This would be despite playing in all 82 games.

On December 31, 2025, Stamkos scores his 600th goal in a 4–2 victory over the Vegas Golden Knights, becoming the second player all time to reach the mark. On April 11, 2026, Stamkos recorded his 40th goal of the 2025–26 season in a 2–1 win over the Minnesota Wild, marking the eighth time of hitting the 40-goal plateau within his career and becoming the third player in Predators history to hit the mark. He ended the season with 42 goals and 24 assists for 66 points in all 82 games played for the second consecutive season. His 66 points were third most on the Predators, trailing the 75 points by Filip Forsberg and 74 points by Ryan O'Reilly. His 42 goals were most on the Predators and tied with Minnesota Wild’ forward Matt Boldy for ninth most in the league. 10 of his 42 goals were game-winners, which were second most in the league, only behind the 12 of the 51 total goals scored by Montreal Canadiens’ forward Cole Caufield.

== Player profile ==
You have so many guys that they skate fast and they can shoot hard, but the quickness of his release [stands out]. And he's always in the right place. You can tell he wants to score all the time.

— New York Rangers goaltender Henrik Lundqvist on Stamkos, June 2012.

Stamkos' goal scoring ability and his ability to shoot the puck at a high velocity has been well documented, to the point where he has been compared to Alexander Ovechkin throughout his career, mainly with his slapshot at the left circle with that spot being known as the "office" for both players. In October 2014, Lightning head coach Jon Cooper characterized Stamkos and Ovechkin's goal scoring reputations and rivalry as one that creates a "tension-building" atmosphere. In November 2024, Stamkos himself reflected about Ovechkin's consistency and longevity by saying: "He's just a generational goal scorer and a guy that I've always looked up to in terms of how he scores goals. It's the hardest thing to do in the NHL is score, and he's found a way to do it better than anyone ever." In April 2025, Stamkos followed up on his and Ovechkin's shot by saying "The faceoff dot, per se, between the hashmark is kind of like the quiet area in the defensive zone. For him and I, it's a spot where we've had a lot of success and you just keep going back to what works."

While Stamkos has been known for being a prolific scorer with a powerful shot, he has been shown to be an efficient playmaker and doesn't shy away from getting physical with opponents in forechecking or backchecking scenarios. In March 2013, Pittsburgh Penguins captain Sidney Crosby described Stamkos as the type of player who will "make you pay every time he gets a chance". In February 2019, former NHL coach Scotty Bowman described Stamkos as a player who "Doesn't need a lot of chances to score and has always been a sniper". In August 2022, former NHL forward and enforcer Mike Rupp classified Stamkos on a segment on NHL Network by saying; “He has a world class shot, he’s a great passer and when he is not scoring, he is “blocking shots and hitting everything that moves and doing all the little things right.”

Stamkos has also been widely praised by his superiors for his leadership abilities and his ability to lead by example on and off the ice. In June 2015, during the 2015 Stanley Cup Final, Lightning teammate Valtteri Filppula described Stamkos as "an example for everybody that works hard". NBC Sports broadcaster and former NHL player Jeremy Roenick also expressed admiration for Stamkos' leadership abilities in August 2016 by saying "Every time I’ve talked to him, I’m so impressed. I am impressed with his leadership, his professionalism. I’m obviously impressed with his talent and what he can do.” During the 2022 Stanley Cup Final in June 2022, Lightning teammate Patrick Maroon labeled Stamkos as the "heartbeat" of the team. In June 2023, Stamkos was named the recipient of the Mark Messier Leadership Award for the 2022–23 season by Mark Messier himself as the most superior leader within their sport by setting a positive example through on-ice performance and as a contributing member of society.

Considered a franchise player while with the Lightning from 2008–2024, drafting Stamkos changed the Lightning's fortunes as a team both on and off the ice. Leading up to the start of the 2008–09 season, the Lightning centered their promotional efforts around Stamkos, including a website with the slogan "Seen Stamkos?", which included advertisements of Stamkos on billboards, signs and bumper stickers across the Tampa area.

From 2011 until 2024, Stamkos was known for his philanthropy as a major supporter of the charity, Ronald House Charities of Tampa with a lot of donations and telling fans after he and his wife Sandra got married in June 2017 to donate to the RHCO rather than give them wedding gifts, and has been known for welcoming families and fans with open arms within that charity to Lightning home games. In September 2019, Stamkos joined Tampa mayor Jane Castor in helping refurbish and reopen the local hockey rink, Tom Oliver Memorial Hockey Rink. This rink was originally donated to the city of Tampa in 1999 through a legacy initiative the NHL has.

Upon unexpectedly leaving the Lightning in free agency and signing with the Nashville Predators in July 2024 after being unable to negotiate an extension with the Lightning, Lightning' defenceman Erik Černák reflected on Stamkos' leadership, the culture he built with the Lightning and his ability to welcome new teammates with open arms by saying when he first arrived to the team in 2018: "He was the first guy who text men and welcomed me to the team: Don't worry we've got you. Just feel comfortable here." In September 2024, Edmonton Oilers forward and captain Connor McDavid summarized Stamkos' tenure with the Lightning by portraying Stamkos as "somebody who gave everything to that city, drafted first overall when they're not very good and becomes the captain and they go year after year running at the cup, I feel like he should've been a Tampa Bay Lightning for life, and ultimately that's not the way it worked." The following month, longtime Lightning teammate and close friend Victor Hedman, who was named the Lighting's new captain leading into the 2024–25 season, said Stamkos' departure was "shocking and tough" and reflected his legacy and culture created by saying “Everything speaks for itself, but just the person himself is going to be missed in the locker room, on the road, everywhere. It’s obviously going to be very different going into that locker room and not seeing No. 91.” Lightning head coach Jon Cooper followed up by saying: "Coming into camp and not having him there, there was definitely a different feeling. Let's be honest: Steven Stamkos and the Tampa Bay Lightning are going to be synonymous with each other until the end of time. He did everything we asked of him for many, many years." Stamkos himself reflected on his lengthy tenure in Tampa and abrupt departure earlier in the 2024 off-season in by saying in his farewell article on The Players' Tribune published in July 2024, shortly after signing in Nashville earlier that month: "I wanted to be the one who lived up to the hype, who took the organization where it dreamt to go. I remember those “Seen Stamkos?” billboards in 2008, and how much faith the Lightning put in me, and I hope I repaid it".

== Personal life ==
On June 30, 2017, Stamkos married his long-time girlfriend Sandra Porzio. The ceremony was held in Toronto and was attended by several of his current and former teammates. He and Sandra have two sons and a daughter.

On October 26, 2017, the Sarnia Sting announced it was retiring Stamkos' number 91. This was done in a ceremony on January 12, 2018. Stamkos was the first player to have his jersey retired in the 23-year history of the Sting.

== International play ==
Medal record

Men's ice hockey

Representing Canada

World Championship
Silver medal – second place	2009 Switzerland	

Canada Cup / World Cup
Gold medal – first place	2016 Toronto	

World Junior Championships
Gold medal – first place	2008 Canada	

Stamkos played for Canada in the 2008 World Junior Ice Hockey Championships, where he helped the team win a gold medal. After his rookie season with the Lightning, Stamkos was named to Canada's senior roster for the 2009 Men's World Ice Hockey Championships. Stamkos continued to impress at the 2009 IIHF World Championships, scoring on his first career shift and meshing with fellow Lightning forward Martin St. Louis for seven goals, 11 points and a +9 plus-minus rating en route to a 2–1 loss to Russia in the finals. He was also selected as a reserve by Canada for the 2010 Winter Olympics and scored seven goals in Canada's fifth-place finish at the 2013 World Championships. Stamkos was expected to be a major contributor for Canada in Sochi for the 2014 Winter Olympics and was named to the roster, but his leg injury sustained prior to the NHL Olympic break, including a broken tibia sustained in November 2013, prevented him from participating. The NHL prohibited its players to take part in the 2018 and 2022 Winter Olympics, which prevented him from participating in those games as well, and he was not selected for Team Canada at the 2026 Winter Olympics, meaning he has never represented Canada at the Olympics during his entire career and is very likely at the point of his career where he will never be able to.

On March 2, 2016, Hockey Canada named Stamkos to its roster for the 2016 World Cup of Hockey in Toronto. Stamkos won the tournament with Team Canada after a 2–1 win over Team Europe in game two of the best-of-three series. He recorded a goal as well as an assist in the tournament, with a plus-minus rating of +3.

== Endorsements ==
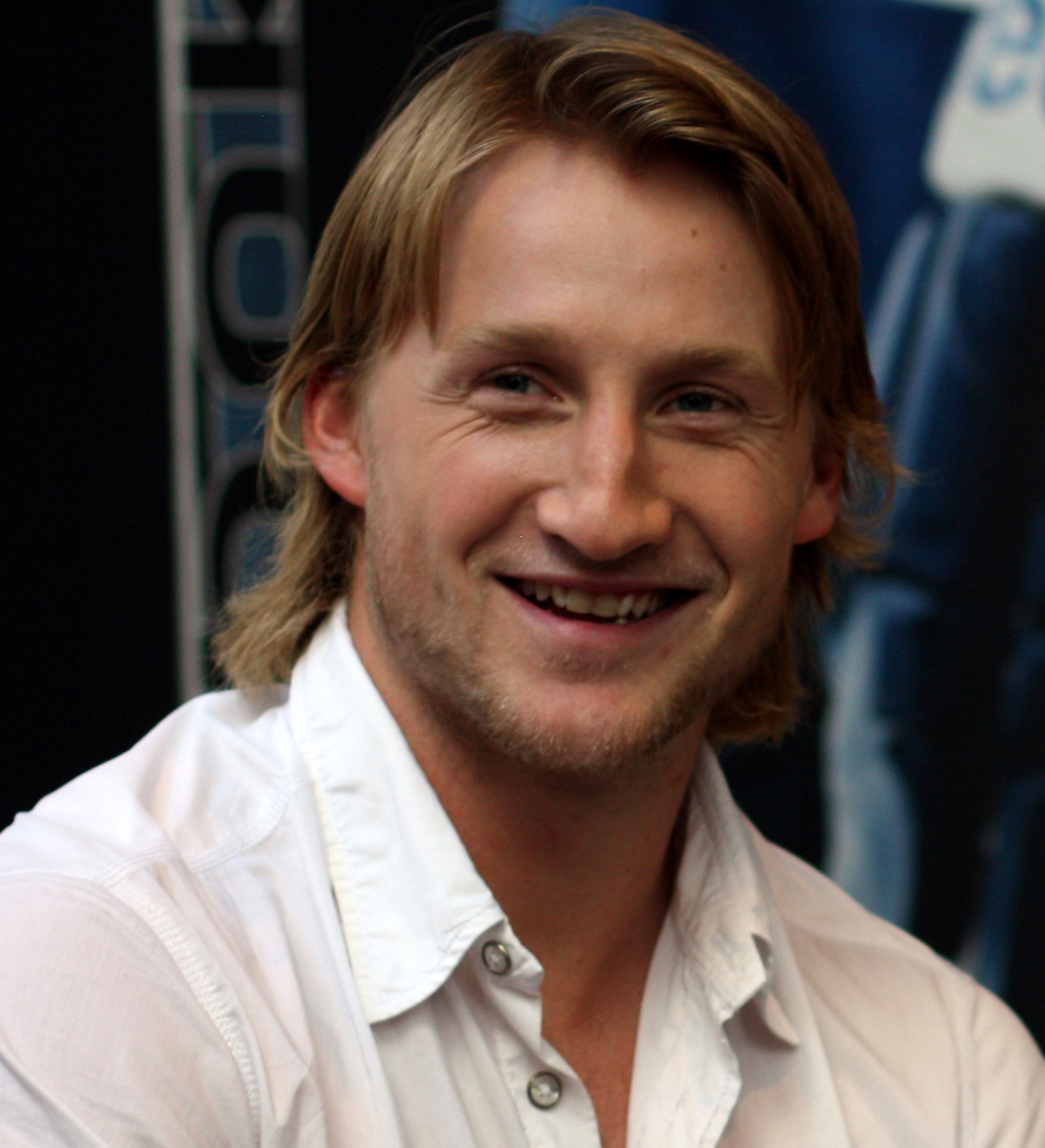
Stamkos doing press at the NHL Store in New York City in September 2011.

Following his selection into the NHL in 2008, Stamkos signed a number of sponsorships, including an athlete's agreement with Nike. He was featured in a web-only Nike commercial called Forget Everything, which was released to coincide with his first game in his hometown of Unionville on October 28, 2008. He has also endorsed Tissot watches as of October 2008. On June 22, 2011, at the 2011 NHL Awards Show, Stamkos was named the cover athlete for the EA Sports' NHL 12 video game. In October 2013, he played the leading role in a web commercial for Coca-Cola Zero named "Shawn Warford's Moment Zero." Most recently, in January 2014, Stamkos signed a multi-year sponsorship with Sport Chek, Canada's largest sports retailer.

== Career statistics ==
=== Regular season and playoffs ===
Bold indicates led league

			Regular season					Playoffs
Season	Team	League	GP	G	A	Pts	PIM	GP	G	A	Pts	PIM
2005–06	Markham Waxers AAA	ETA U16	66	105	92	197	87	—	—	—	—	—
2006–07	Sarnia Sting	OHL	63	42	50	92	56	4	3	3	6	0
2007–08	Sarnia Sting	OHL	61	58	47	105	88	9	11	0	11	20
2008–09	Tampa Bay Lightning	NHL	79	23	23	46	39	—	—	—	—	—
2009–10	Tampa Bay Lightning	NHL	82	**51**	44	95	36	—	—	—	—	—
2010–11	Tampa Bay Lightning	NHL	82	45	46	91	74	18	6	7	13	6
2011–12	Tampa Bay Lightning	NHL	82	**60**	37	97	66	—	—	—	—	—
2012–13	Tampa Bay Lightning	NHL	48	29	28	57	32	—	—	—	—	—
2013–14	Tampa Bay Lightning	NHL	37	25	15	40	18	4	2	2	4	6
2014–15	Tampa Bay Lightning	NHL	82	43	29	72	49	26	7	11	18	20
2015–16	Tampa Bay Lightning	NHL	77	36	28	64	38	1	0	0	0	0
2016–17	Tampa Bay Lightning	NHL	17	9	11	20	14	—	—	—	—	—
2017–18	Tampa Bay Lightning	NHL	78	27	59	86	72	17	7	9	16	4
2018–19	Tampa Bay Lightning	NHL	82	45	53	98	37	4	1	1	2	2
2019–20	Tampa Bay Lightning	NHL	57	29	37	66	22	1	1	0	1	0
2020–21	Tampa Bay Lightning	NHL	38	17	17	34	16	23	8	10	18	4
2021–22	Tampa Bay Lightning	NHL	81	42	64	106	36	23	11	8	19	25
2022–23	Tampa Bay Lightning	NHL	81	34	50	84	46	6	2	2	4	9
2023–24	Tampa Bay Lightning	NHL	79	40	41	81	34	5	5	1	6	2
2024–25	Nashville Predators	NHL	82	27	26	53	48	—	—	—	—	—
2025–26	Nashville Predators	NHL	82	42	24	66	58	—	—	—	—	—
NHL totals			1,246	624	632	1,256	737	128	50	51	101	78

=== International ===
Year	Team	Event	Results	GP	G	A	Pts	PIM
2007	Canada	U18	4th	6	2	8	10	8
2007	Canada	IH18	4th	4	1	4	5	16
2008	Canada	WJC	1st place, gold medalist(s)	7	1	5	6	4
2009	Canada	WC	2nd place, silver medalist(s)	9	7	4	11	6
2010	Canada	WC	7th	5	2	1	3	10
2013	Canada	WC	5th	8	7	5	12	6
2016	Canada	WCH	1st place, gold medalist(s)	6	1	1	2	2
Junior totals				17	4	17	21	28
Senior totals				28	17	11	28	24

== Awards and honours ==
Award	Year	Ref
OHL
Jack Ferguson Award	2006	
Bobby Smith Trophy	2007	
Second All-Rookie Team	2007	
Second All-Star team	2008	
CHL Top Draft Prospect Award	2008	
CHL first All-Star team	2008	
NHL
NHL YoungStars Game	2009	
Mark Messier Leadership Award	2023	
Maurice "Rocket" Richard Trophy	2010, 2012	
NHL All-Star Game	2011, 2012, 2015, 2016, 2018, 2019, 2022	
NHL second All-Star team	2011, 2012	
NHL 2010s All Decade Second Team	2020	
NHL Quarter-Century Team	2025	
NHL Quarter-Century Tampa Bay Lightning First Team	2025	
EA Sports NHL cover athlete	2012	
Stanley Cup champion	2020, 2021	
International
World U18 All-Star team	2007	
World Championship All-Star team	2009	

=== Nominations ===
Award	Year
NHL
Hart Memorial Trophy	2012
Ted Lindsay Award	2011, 2012

== Records ==
=== Single season ===
- Most goals in a single month by a Tampa Bay Lightning player, 14 (2018–19)
- Most goals in a single season by a Tampa Bay Lightning player, 60 (2011–12)
- Most overtime goals in a single season by a Tampa Bay Lightning player, 6 (2011–12)
- Most power-play goals in a single season by a Tampa Bay Lightning player, 24 (2009–10)
- Most game-winning goals in a single season by a Tampa Bay Lightning player, 12 (2011–12)
- Most even-strength goals in a single season by a Tampa Bay Lightning player, 48 (2011–12)
- Most consecutive games with a point to start a season by a Tampa Bay Lightning player, 11 (2017–18)
- Most points in a single month by a Tampa Bay Lightning player, 33 (2021–22)

=== Career, regular season ===
- Most career goals by a Tampa Bay Lightning player, 555
- Most career hat-tricks by a Tampa Bay Lightning player, 13
- Most power-play goals by a Tampa Bay Lightning player, 195
- Most game winning goals by a Tampa Bay Lightning player, 79
- Most even-strength goals by a Tampa Bay Lightning player, 315
- Most career regular season games with 4+ points by a Tampa Bay Lightning player, 17

== See also ==
- List of NHL players with 50-goal seasons
- List of NHL players with 500 goals
- List of NHL players with 100-point seasons
- List of NHL players with 1,000 points

Awards and achievements
Preceded by Patrick Kane	NHL first overall draft pick 2008	Succeeded by John Tavares
Preceded by Riku Helenius	Tampa Bay Lightning first-round draft pick 2008	Succeeded by Victor Hedman
Preceded by Alexander Ovechkin	Maurice "Rocket" Richard Trophy winner 2010; With: Sidney Crosby	Succeeded by Corey Perry
Preceded by Corey Perry	Maurice "Rocket" Richard Trophy winner 2012	Succeeded by Alexander Ovechkin
Sporting positions
Preceded by Martin St. Louis	Tampa Bay Lightning captain 2014–24	Succeeded by Victor Hedman
