= NHL 12 =

2011 video game

- The cover of NHL 12, featuring Steven Stamkos
- Developer: EA Canada
- Publisher: EA Sports
- Series: NHL series
- Platforms: PlayStation 3; Xbox 360
- Release: EU: September 9, 2011; NA: September 13, 2011; AU: September 15, 2011
- Genre: Sports
- Modes: Single-player, multiplayer

NHL 12 is an ice hockey video game developed by EA Canada and published by EA Sports. The game was featured in the 2011 Electronic Entertainment Expo (E3). Steven Stamkos was announced as the game's cover athlete on June 22, 2011, at the NHL Awards Show in Las Vegas, Nevada. The game notably includes more interactive goalies (i.e. players can have real contact with the goalies and vice versa, and the goalies and skaters may fight each other), better physics engine, improved Be a Pro mode (a feature allowing users to play fictional careers), and the ability to play the 2011 NHL Winter Classic. Along with several other new EA Sports titles, NHL 12 was made available three days prior the official release dates to purchasers of the EA Sports Season Ticket, a new digital program allowing users with a PlayStation 3 and/or an Xbox 360 to download and test the full version of new EA Sports titles for a three-day trial period by paying an annual fee of $24.99 or 2,000 Microsoft points. Users who pre-ordered the retail version of the game may have received a code for a goalie boost pack, which improves certain parts of the player's goalie in the "Be a Pro" mode. Gary Thorne (play-by-play) and Bill Clement (color) return to provide commentary for NHL 12.

== Gameplay ==
=== Playoff Mode ===
Playoff is a singleplayer mode that allows the player to create a custom tournament bracket with the teams and leagues available in the game. The player can choose to play each game or simulate the outcome, all the while tracking the stats of their own team. Gameplay settings such as injuries and difficulty level can be customized.

=== Be a Pro ===
Be a Pro is similar to Playoff Mode, but puts the player in control of a single player of their own creation, gradually leveling up the skills of their player. A variation of this mode exists, called "Be a Legend" where the player can take on the role of real players in the NHL.

=== Be a GM ===
The player is the manager of the team, tasked with organizing the roster and the acquisition and trade of players.

== Reception ==
Reception

Aggregate score
Aggregator	Score	
Aggregator	PS3	Xbox 360
Metacritic	86/100	86/100

Review scores
Publication	Score	
Publication	PS3	Xbox 360
Destructoid	N/A	8/10
Game Informer	8.75/10	8.75/10
GamePro	4/5	4/5
GameRevolution	A−	A−
GameSpot	8/10	8/10
GameTrailers	9.2/10	9.2/10
Giant Bomb	4/5	4/5
IGN	8.5/10	8.5/10
Official Xbox Magazine (US)	N/A	8/10
PlayStation: The Official Magazine	9/10	N/A
The Daily Telegraph	N/A	4/5
The Digital Fix	8/10	N/A

NHL 12 received "favorable" reviews on both platforms according to the review aggregation website Metacritic. GameTrailers said that the gameplay "just feels more alive," but were somewhat frustrated that they "did manage to find a technique to score a little too often," and also noted that the game "looks almost identical to last year's effort." They praised the EA Sports developers however, describing them as a team unwilling to believe that an "amazing" product is enough. The "Be A Legend" mode, however, did not get much of the same praise; GameTrailers said that the mode "feels like a missed opportunity."

PlayStation Universe's Adam Dolge described it as "yet another terrific hockey game, and well worth the attention of any puck fan." Dolge mainly praised the gameplay improvements, noting the A.I. and the physics engine, which has been enhanced as well. He also praised the revamped presentation of the game. However, Dolge agreed with GameTrailers that the new "Be a Legend" mode is not well thought-out, and criticized the Be a Pro camera angle. He also believed that the Be a GM mode needed to be revamped.
