= List of basketball video games =

The following is a list of basketball video games. Most of these sports video games represent basketball in the National Basketball Association (NBA).

== Franchises ==
- Barkley Shut Up and Jam!
- College Hoops
- Double Dribble
- ESPN NBA 2Night
- NBA Playoffs
- NBA
- NBA 2K
- NBA All-Star Challenge
- NBA Ballers
- NBA Courtside
- NBA in the Zone
- NBA Jam
- NBA Live
- NBA ShootOut
- NBA Street
- NCAA Basketball
- Run and Gun
- Slam Dunk
- Tecmo NBA Basketball

== Games ==
Title	Release date(s)	Platform(s)	Developer(s)	Publisher(s)
Basketball	1973	Odyssey	Magnavox	Magnavox
TV Basketball	April 1974	Arcade	Taito	Taito, Midway
Basketball!	1978	Odyssey²	Magnavox	Magnavox
Basketball	1978	Atari 2600; Atari 8-bit 1979	Atari	Atari
Atari Basketball	1979	Arcade	Atari, Inc.	Atari
NBA Basketball	1979	Intellivision	APh Technological Consulting	Mattel
Basketball	1982	Arcadia 2001	-	-
One on One: Dr. J vs. Larry Bird	1983	Apple II; Commodore 641984; Amiga1985; Mac; Atari 78001987; Atari 8-bit TRS-80 Color Computer; IBM PC	Eric Hammond	Electronic Arts
Super Basketball	1984	Arcade	Konami	Konami
International Basketball	1984	Commodore 64	-	-
Double Dribble	1986	Arcade; NES 1987; Commodore 64 1990; Amiga 1990; MS-DOS 1990	Konami	Konami
GBA Championship Basketball: Two-on-Two	1986	MS-DOS; Amiga; Apple IIGS1987; Amstrad CPC; Atari ST; ZX Spectrum; Commodore 64	Dynamix	Activision
NBA	1987	Apple II	Avalon Hill	Avalon Hill
Slam Dunk Super Pro Basketball	1987	Intellivision	Realtime Associates	INTV Corp.
Street Sports Basketball	1987	Amiga; Amstrad CPC; Apple II; Commodore 64; MS-DOS; ZX Spectrum	Epyx	Epyx
Great Basketball	1987	Master System	-	-
Basket Master	1987	Commodore 64	Dinamic/Imagine	-
Sam & Ed Basketball	1987	Commodore 64	-	-
Jordan vs. Bird: One on One	1988	NES; Commodore 64; Game Boy; MS-DOS; Genesis 1992	Electronic Arts	Electronic Arts
Magic Johnson's Fast Break	1988	Arcade; Amiga 1989; Commodore 64 1989; MS-DOS 1989; Amstrad CPC 1990; NES 1990; ZX Spectrum 1990; MSX	Arcadia Systems	Arcadia Systems
Advanced Basketball Simulator	1988	Commodore 64	Sculptured Software	Mastertronic
Hoops	1988	NES	Aicom	Jaleco
Arch Rivals	1989	Arcade; NES 1990; Genesis1992; Game Gear1992; PlayStation 2 Xbox; GameCube; MS-DOS	Midway	Midway
Basketball Nightmare	1989	Master System	Sega	Sega
Lakers versus Celtics and the NBA Playoffs	1989	MS-DOS; Genesis 1991	Electronic Arts	Electronic Arts
All-Pro Basketball	1989	NES	Aicom	Vic Tokai
Omni-Play Basketball (Magic Johnson's MVP)	1989	Amiga; Commodore 64; MS-DOS	DesignStar Consultants	SportTime
Ultimate Basketball	1990	NES	Aicom	American Sammy
Takin' It to the Hoop	1990	TurboGrafx-16	Aicom	Aicom
Basketbrawl	1990	Atari 7800	Atari	Atari
Punk Shot	1990	Arcade	Konami	Konami
TV Sports Basketball	1990	Amiga; MS-DOS; Commodore 64; TurboGrafx-16	Cinemaware	Mirrorsoft
Pat Riley Basketball	December 31, 1990	Genesis	Sega	Sega
Harlem Globetrotters	1990	MS-DOS; NES 1991	Softie	GameTek
David Robinson's Supreme Court	1991	Genesis	Acme Interactive	Sega
Bill Laimbeer's Combat Basketball	1991	Super NES	Hudson Soft	Hudson Soft
Rim Rockin' Basketball	1991	Arcade	Strata	-
NCAA Basketball	1992	Super NES	Sculptured Software	Sculptured Software
Tecmo NBA Basketball	1992	NES	Tecmo	Tecmo
Team USA Basketball	1992	Genesis	Electronic Arts	Electronic Arts
Bulls versus Lakers and the NBA Playoffs	1992	Genesis	Electronic Arts	Electronic Arts
Bulls versus Blazers and the NBA Playoffs	1992	Super NES; Genesis	Electronic Arts	Electronic Arts
NBA All-Star Challenge	1992	Super NES; Genesis	Beam Software	Genesis: Flying Edge; Super NES: JP: Acclaim Japan; NA: LJN
Roundball: 2 on 2 Challenge	1992	NES	Park Place Productions	Mindscapce, Inc
NBA Jam	1993	Arcade; Super NES; Genesis; Game Boy; Game Gear; Sega CD	Acclaim; Iguana Entertainment; Beam Software	Acclaim
Tecmo Super NBA Basketball	1993	Super NES; Sega Genesis	Tecmo	Tecmo
Super Slam Dunk	1993	Super NES	Park Place Productions	Virgin Interactive
Michael Jordan in Flight	1993	MS-DOS	Electronic Arts	Electronic Arts
Run and Gun	1993	Arcade	Konami	Konami
NBA Showdown ("NBA Showdown 94" on Mega Drive/Genesis)	1993	Super NES; Genesis	Electronic Arts	Electronic Arts
Barkley Shut Up and Jam! ("Barkley's Power Dunk" in Japan)	1993	Genesis; Super NES; Atari Jaguar	Accolade	Accolade
Slam City with Scottie Pippen	March 1994	Sega CD; 32X; MS-DOS	Digital Pictures	Digital Pictures
NBA Action '94	1994	Genesis; Game Gear	Sega Sports	Sega
NBA Live 95	October 1994	Super NES; Genesis; MS-DOS	Hitmen Productions	EA Sports
Jammit	1994	Genesis; Super NES; 3DO; MS-DOS	GTE Vantage	GTE Entertainment
Dick Vitale's "Awesome, Baby!" College Hoops	1994	Genesis	Time Warner Interactive	Time Warner Interactive
Street Slam ("Dunk Dream" in Japan) ("Street Hoop" in Europe)	1994	Neo-Geo; Wii Virtual Console 2010	Data East	Data East
Double Dribble: The Playoff Edition	1994	Genesis	Konami	Konami
ESPN NBA Hangtime '95	1994	Sega CD	Sony Imagesoft	Sony Imagesoft
Barkley Shut Up and Jam! 2	1995	Genesis	Accolade	Accolade
Coach K College Basketball	1995	Genesis	Electronic Arts	EA Sports
Hoops 96 ("Dunk Dream 95" in Japan)	1995	Arcade	Data East	Data East
Looney Tunes B-Ball	February 1995	Super Nintendo	Sculptured Software	Sunsoft
NBA Give 'n Go	1995	Super NES	Konami	Konami
NBA Action '95 (aka "NBA Action starring David Robinson")	1995	Genesis	Sega Sports	Sega Sports
NBA Live 96	October 1995	Super NES; Genesis; PlayStation; MS-DOS	Electronic Arts	Electronic Arts
NBA Jam Tournament Edition	1995	Arcade	Midway	Midway
NBA In The Zone (Japan as "NBA Power Dunkers") (Australia as "NBA Pro")	December 14, 1995	PlayStation; Game Boy Color 1999	Konami	Konami
Run and Gun 2	1996	Arcade	Konami	Konami
NBA ShootOut ("Total NBA" in Europe)	1996	PlayStation	SCEA	SCEA
NBA Hangtime	1996	Arcade; Genesis; Windows; Super NES; Nintendo 64; PlayStation	Midway	Midway
NBA Jam Extreme	1996	Arcade; PlayStation; Saturn; Windows	Acclaim	Acclaim
NBA Full Court Press	1996	Windows	Microsoft	Microsoft
NBA Live 97	October 31, 1996	PlayStation; MS-DOS; Saturn; Sega Genesis; Super NES	Electronic Arts	Electronic Arts
NBA In The Zone 2	November 30, 1996	PlayStation	Konami	Konami
NBA Action	1996	Saturn	Gray Matter	Sega
College Slam	1996	PlayStation; MS-DOS; Saturn; Genesis; Super NES; Game Boy	Iguana Entertainment UK	Acclaim
NBA ShootOut '97	1997	PlayStation	SCEA	SCEA
NCAA Basketball Final Four ‘97	1997	Windows, PlayStation	High Voltage Software	Mindscape
NBA Live 98	October 31, 1997	PlayStation; Super NES	Electronic Arts	Electronic Arts
NBA Fastbreak '98	November 27, 1997	PlayStation	Visual Concepts	Midway
1 on 1	1998; 2000; 2009	PlayStation; Arcade; Playstation 3, PSP	Jorudan	D3 Publisher; Tecmo; Jorudan
NBA Play by Play	1998	Arcade	Konami	Konami
NBA In The Zone '98	January 31, 1998; February 10, 1998	PlayStation; Nintendo 64	Konami	Konami
NBA ShootOut 98	February 28, 1998	PlayStation	SCEA	SCEA
NCAA March Madness 98	February 28, 1998	PlayStation	Electronic Arts	EA Sports
Kobe Bryant in NBA Courtside	April 1, 1998	Nintendo 64	Left Field Productions	Nintendo
NBA Live 99	October 31, 1998; November 4, 1998	Windows; PlayStation; Nintendo 64	EA Sports	EA Sports
Fox Sports College Hoops '99	October 31, 1998	Nintendo 64	Z-Axis	Fox Interactive
NCAA March Madness 99	November 30, 1998	PlayStation	Electronic Arts	Electronic Arts
NBA Jam 99	December 4, 1998	Nintendo 64; Game Boy Color 1999; Virtual Console	Iguana Entertainment UK	Acclaim
NBA In The Zone '99	March 31, 1999; April 7, 1999	PlayStation; Nintendo 64	Konami	Konami
NBA Showtime: NBA on NBC	1999	Arcade; PlayStation; Nintendo 64; Dreamcast; Game Boy Color 2000	Avalanche Software; Eurocom Entertainment Software	Midway
NBA Inside Drive 2000	August 26, 1999	Windows	High Voltage Software	Microsoft Game Studios
NBA Basketball 2000	October 31, 1999; November 3, 1999	PlayStation; Windows	Radical Entertainment	Fox Interactive
NBA Courtside 2: Featuring Kobe Bryant	October 31, 1999	Nintendo 64	Left Field Productions	Nintendo
NBA Live 2000	October 31, 1999; November 2, 1999	Nintendo 64; Windows; PlayStation	EA Sports	EA Sports
NBA 2K	November 10, 1999	Dreamcast	Visual Concepts	Sega Sports
NBA ShootOut 2000	November 30, 1999	PlayStation	989 Sports	989 Sports
NBA Jam 2000	November 30, 1999	Nintendo 64	Acclaim	Acclaim
NCAA March Madness 2000	November 30, 1999	PlayStation	Black Ops Entertainment	Electronic Arts
Virtua NBA	2000	Arcade	Sega	Sega
NBA In The Zone 2000	February 2, 2000; February 18, 2000; April 27, 2000	PlayStation; Nintendo 64; Game Boy Color	Konami	Konami
NBA Live 2001	October 16, 2000; January 22, 2001; February 7, 2001	PlayStation; PlayStation 2 Windows	NuFX	EA Sports
NBA ShootOut 2001	October 30, 2000; February 19, 2001	PlayStation 2 PlayStation	989 Sports	SCEA
NBA 2K1	November 1, 2000	Dreamcast	Visual Concepts	Sega Sports
ESPN NBA 2Night	November 20, 2000; February 13, 2001	Dreamcast; PlayStation 2	Konami	Konami
NBA Jam 2001	December 5, 2000	Game Boy Color	Acclaim	Acclaim
NCAA March Madness 2001	December 6, 2000	PlayStation	Black Ops Entertainment	Electronic Arts
Backyard Basketball	2001	Windows; Macintosh; PlayStation 2 Game Boy Advance	Humongous Entertainment	Infogrames Entertainment SA
NBA Hoopz	February 12, 2001; February 13, 2001; February 25, 2001; February 26, 2001	PlayStation 2 PlayStation; Game Boy Color; Dreamcast	Eurocom Entertainment Software	Midway
NBA Street	June 18, 2001; February 17, 2002	PlayStation 2 GameCube	NuFX	EA Sports Big
NBA ShootOut 2002	September 1, 2001	PlayStation	989 Sports	SCEA
NBA 2K2	October 24, 2001; January 12, 2002; February 27, 2002; March 20, 2002	PlayStation 2 Xbox; GameCube; Dreamcast	Visual Concepts	Sega
NBA Live 2002	October 29, 2001; October 30, 2001; November 18, 2001	PlayStation 2 PlayStation; Xbox	EA Sports	EA Sports
NCAA March Madness 2002	January 7, 2002	PlayStation 2	EA Canada	Electronic Arts
NBA Courtside 2002	January 13, 2002	GameCube	Left Field	Nintendo
NBA Inside Drive 2002	January 21, 2002	Xbox	High Voltage Software	Microsoft Game Studios
NBA Jam 2002	February 17, 2002	Game Boy Advance	Acclaim	Acclaim
ESPN NBA 2Night 2002	February 25, 2002; April 16, 2002	PlayStation 2 Xbox	Konami	Konami
Street Hoops	August 12, 2002; October 4, 2002; November 28, 2002	PlayStation 2 Xbox; GameCube	Black Ops Entertainment	Activision
NBA ShootOut 2003	September 29, 2002	PlayStation; PlayStation 2	989 Sports	SCEA
NBA 2K3	October 7, 2002; October 8, 2002; October 9, 2002	GameCube; PlayStation 2 Xbox	Visual Concepts	Sega
NBA Live 2003	October 8, 2002; November 14, 2002	PlayStation 2 Xbox; GameCube; PlayStation; Windows	EA Canada	EA Sports
NBA Starting Five	October 9, 2002	PlayStation 2 Xbox	Konami	Konami
NBA Inside Drive 2003	October 15, 2002	Xbox	High Voltage Software	Microsoft Game Studios
NCAA March Madness 2003	November 21, 2002	PlayStation 2	Electronic Arts	Electronic Arts
NBA Street Vol. 2	April 28, 2003	PlayStation 2 Xbox; GameCube	NuFX	EA Sports Big
NBA Jam	September 23, 2003	PlayStation 2 Xbox	Acclaim	Acclaim
NBA ShootOut 2004	September 30, 2003; October 29, 2003	PlayStation 2 PlayStation	989 Sports	SCEA
NBA Live 2004	October 14, 2003; October 15, 2003; November 11, 2003	PlayStation 2 Xbox; GameCube; Windows	EA Sports	EA Sports
ESPN NBA Basketball	October 21, 2003; October 22, 2003	PlayStation 2 Xbox	Visual Concepts	Sega
NCAA March Madness 2004	November 17, 2003	PlayStation 2 Xbox	Electronic Arts	Electronic Arts
NBA Inside Drive 2004	November 18, 2003	Xbox	High Voltage Software	Microsoft Game Studios
NBA Ballers	April 5, 2004	PlayStation 2 Xbox; GameCube	Midway	Midway
ESPN NBA 2K5	September 28, 2004; September 30, 2004	Xbox; PlayStation 2	Visual Concepts	Sega
NBA Live 2005	September 28, 2004; October 26, 2004	PlayStation 2 Xbox; GameCube; Windows	EA Canada	EA Sports
NCAA March Madness 2005	November 17, 2004	PlayStation 2 Xbox	EA Canada	EA Sports
ESPN College Hoops 2K5	November 17, 2004	PlayStation 2 Xbox	Visual Concepts	Sega
NBA Street V3	February 8, 2005	PlayStation 2 Xbox; GameCube	EA Canada	EA Sports Big
NBA	March 16, 2005	PlayStation Portable	989 Sports	SCEA
NBA Street Showdown	April 27, 2005	PlayStation Portable	EA Canada	EA Sports Big
NBA 2K6	September 26, 2005; November 16, 2005	PlayStation 2 Xbox; Xbox 360	Visual Concepts	2K Sports
NBA Live 06	September 26, 2005; October 4, 2005; November 16, 2005	PlayStation 2 Xbox; GameCube; Windows; PlayStation Portable; Xbox 360	EA Canada	EA Sports
NBA 06	October 4, 2005; November 1, 2005	PlayStation Portable; PlayStation 2	San Diego Studio	SCEA
NCAA March Madness 06	October 11, 2005	Xbox; PlayStation 2	EA Canada	EA Sports
NBA Ballers: Phenom	March 29, 2006; April 5, 2006	Xbox; PlayStation 2	Midway	Midway
NBA Ballers: Rebound	May 9, 2006	PlayStation Portable	Backbone Entertainment	Midway
Mario Hoops 3-on-3	July 27, 2006	Nintendo DS	Square Enix	Nintendo
NBA 07	September 25, 2006; November 14, 2006	PlayStation 2 PlayStation Portable; PlayStation 3	San Diego Studio	SCEA
NBA 2K7	September 25, 2006; November 13, 2006	PlayStation 2 PlayStation 3 Xbox 360; Xbox	Visual Concepts; Kush Games	2K Sports
NBA Live 07	September 25, 2006	Windows; PlayStation 2 PlayStation Portable; Xbox 360; Xbox	EA Canada	EA Sports
NCAA March Madness 07	January 17, 2007	PlayStation 2 Xbox 360	EA Canada	EA Sports
NBA Street Homecourt	February 20, 2007; March 6, 2007	PlayStation 3 Xbox 360	EA Canada	EA Sports Big
NBA 08	September 26, 2007; October 12, 2007	PlayStation 2 PlayStation 3 PlayStation Portable	San Diego Studio	SCEA
NBA Live 08	October 1, 2007; October 30, 2007	PlayStation 2 PlayStation 3 PlayStation Portable; Xbox 360; Wii; Windows	EA Canada	EA Sports
NBA 2K8	October 2, 2007	PlayStation 2 PlayStation 3 Xbox 360	Visual Concepts	2K Sports
NCAA March Madness 08	December 11, 2007	PlayStation 2 PlayStation 3 Xbox 360	EA Canada	EA Sports
NBA Ballers: Chosen One	April 21, 2008	PlayStation 3 Xbox 360	Midway	Midway
NBA 09: The Inside	October 7, 2008	PlayStation 2 PlayStation 3 PlayStation Portable	San Diego Studio	SCEA
NBA 2K9	October 7, 2008	Windows; PlayStation 2 PlayStation 3 Xbox 360	Visual Concepts	2K Sports
NBA Live 09	October 7, 2008	PlayStation 2 PlayStation 3 PlayStation Portable; Xbox 360; Wii	EA Canada	EA Sports
NCAA Basketball 09	November 17, 2008	PlayStation 2 PlayStation 3 Xbox 360	EA Canada	EA Sports
World Basketball Manager	April, 2009	Windows	Icehole	Icehole
Flick NBA Basketball	April 27, 2009	iOS (iPhone, iPod Touch, iPad)	Freeverse	Freeverse
Wii Sports Resort	July 26, 2009	Wii	Nintendo EAD	Nintendo
NBA 10: The Inside	October 6, 2009	PlayStation Portable	San Diego Studio	SCEA
NBA 2K10	October 6, 2009; October 12, 2009; November 9, 2009	PlayStation 2 PlayStation 3 PlayStation Portable; Xbox 360; Windows; Wii	Visual Concepts	2K Sports
NBA Live 10	October 6, 2009	iOS (iPhone, iPod Touch, iPad); PlayStation 3 PlayStation Portable; Xbox 360	EA Canada	EA Sports
NBA Unrivaled	November 11, 2009; April 1, 2010; June 23, 2010	PlayStation 3 Xbox 360	A.C.R.O.N.Y.M. Games	Tecmo
NCAA Basketball 10	November 18, 2009	PlayStation 3 Xbox 360	EA Canada	EA Sports
StarDunk	July 12, 2010	iOS, Android	Godzilab	Playdigious
NBA Jam	October 5, 2010; November 17, 2010; February 10, 2011	Wii; Xbox 360; PlayStation 3 iOS	EA Canada	EA Sports
NBA 2K11	October 5, 2010	Windows; PlayStation 2 PlayStation 3 PlayStation Portable; Wii; Xbox 360	Visual Concepts	2K Sports
NBA Elite 11	November 5, 2010	iOS	EA Canada	EA Sports
Mario Sports Mix	November 25, 2010	Wii	Square Enix	Nintendo
NBA 2K12	October 4, 2011	Windows; PlayStation 2 PlayStation 3 PlayStation Portable; Wii; Xbox 360	Visual Concepts	2K Sports
Mario & Sonic at the London 2012 Olympic Games	February 10, 2012	Nintendo 3DS	Sega; Nintendo SPD Group No.4	Sega
NBA 2K13	October 2, 2012; November 18, 2012	Windows; PlayStation 3 PlayStation Portable; Wii; Xbox 360; Wii U	Visual Concepts	2K Sports
NBA 2K14	October 1, 2013; November 15, 2013; November 22, 2013	Windows; PlayStation 3 Xbox 360; PlayStation 4 Xbox One	Visual Concepts	2K Sports
NBA Live 14	November 19, 2013	PlayStation 4 Xbox One	EA Tiburon	EA Sports
NBA Rush	January 4, 2014	iOS	Other Ocean Interactive	RenRen Games USA
NBA 2K15	October 7, 2014	Windows; PlayStation 3 Xbox 360; PlayStation 4 Xbox One	Visual Concepts	2K Sports
NBA Live 15	October 28, 2014	PlayStation 4 Xbox One	EA Tiburon	EA Sports
NBA 2K16	September 25, 2015 September 29, 2015	Windows; PlayStation 3 Xbox 360; PlayStation 4 Xbox One	Visual Concepts	2K Sports
NBA Live 16	September 29, 2015	PlayStation 4 Xbox One	EA Tiburon	EA Sports
Super Basket Manager 16	October 8, 2015	Android	BT Games Studio	BT Games Studio
NBA 2K17	September 20, 2016	Windows; PlayStation 3 Xbox 360; PlayStation 4 Xbox One	Visual Concepts	2K Sports
3on3 FreeStyle	December 9, 2016	Windows; PlayStation 4 Xbox One	JoyCity	JoyCity
NBA Playgrounds	May 2017	Windows; Nintendo Switch; PlayStation 4 Xbox One	Saber Interactive	Saber Interactive
NBA 2K18	September 29, 2017	Windows; PlayStation 3 Xbox 360; PlayStation 4 Xbox One; Nintendo Switch	Visual Concepts	2K Sports
NBA Live 18	September 15, 2017	PlayStation 4 Xbox One	EA Tiburon	EA Sports
NBA Live 19	September 7, 2018	PlayStation 4 Xbox One	EA Tiburon	EA Sports
NBA 2K Playgrounds 2	October 26, 2018	Windows; PlayStation 4 Nintendo Switch; Xbox One	Saber Interactive	2K Sports
NBA 2K20	September 6, 2019	PlayStation 4 Xbox One; Windows; Nintendo Switch	Visual Concepts	2K Sports
NBA 2K21	September 4, 2020	Microsoft Windows; Nintendo Switch; PlayStation 4 PlayStation 5 Xbox One; Xbox Series X/S; Stadia; Apple Arcade	Visual Concepts	2K Sports
NBA 2K22	September 10, 2021	Microsoft Windows; Nintendo Switch; PlayStation 4 PlayStation 5 Xbox One; Xbox Series X/S	Visual Concepts	2K Sports
Nintendo Switch Sports	April 29, 2022	Nintendo Switch	Nintendo EPD	Nintendo
NBA 2K23	September 9, 2022; October 18, 2022	Microsoft Windows; Nintendo Switch; PlayStation 4 PlayStation 5 Xbox One; Xbox Series X/S; Apple Arcade	Visual Concepts	2K Sports
NBA 2K24	September 8, 2023	Microsoft Windows; Nintendo Switch; PlayStation 4 PlayStation 5 Xbox One; Xbox Series X/S; Apple Arcade	Visual Concepts	2K Sports
NBA 2K25	September 4, 2024	Microsoft Windows; Nintendo Switch; PlayStation 4 PlayStation 5 Xbox One; Xbox Series X/S; Apple Arcade	Visual Concepts	2K Sports
Drag x Drive	August 14, 2025	Nintendo Switch 2	Nintendo EPD	Nintendo
NBA 2K26	September 5, 2025	Microsoft Windows; Nintendo Switch; Nintendo Switch 2 PlayStation 4 PlayStation 5 Xbox One; Xbox Series X/S; Apple Arcade	Visual Concepts	2K Sports
NBA the Run	June 9, 2026	Microsoft Windows; PlayStation 5 Xbox Series X/S	Play by Play Studios	Play by Play Studios
NBA 2K27	September 4, 2026	Microsoft Windows; Nintendo Switch 2 PlayStation 5 Xbox Series X/S	Visual Concepts	2K Sports
Nintendo Switch Sports Resort	October 22, 2026	Nintendo Switch 2	Nintendo EPD	Nintendo
