= Run and gun =

Run and gun may refer to:

- Run and gun video game, a sub-genre of shoot 'em up video games
- Run&Gun, a Japanese boy band and performance troupe
- Run and gun (basketball), a style of play in basketball
- Another name for the run and shoot offense, an offensive system in American football
- Run and Gun, a 1993 basketball video game released by Konami in 1993
  - Run and Gun II, the 1996 sequel
