= NCAA March Madness 2004 =

2003 PS2 and Xbox video game

- Developers: NuFX (PS2); EA Canada (Xbox)
- Publisher: Electronic Arts
- Series: NCAA March Madness
- Platforms: PlayStation 2, Xbox
- Release: NA: November 17, 2003
- Genre: Sports
- Modes: Single-player, multiplayer

NCAA March Madness 2004 is the 2003 installment in the NCAA March Madness series. Former Syracuse player Carmelo Anthony is featured on the cover. Commentary is done by Brad Nessler and "Mr. College Basketball" Dick Vitale as he is introduced in the game. This is the first entry in which players can pick their favorite schools. The menus are then stylized in the school's colors, and a cheerleader or mascot can appear on the main menu the school's fight song plays. The game plays similarly to NBA Live 2004.

== Features ==
The game allows the player to pick their favorite school and run a college basketball dynasty for 30 seasons and attempt to lead them to national championships. The player can play as a prestigious school or a school of lower prestige in an attempt to bring them into the national spotlight. The game allows the player to create their own school, but with limited options. The game features all of the major tournaments including the NCAA Tournament and Maui Invitational and a Frat Party Mode which is a four team tournament for four players. Other modes include mascot game, where the player can play as a school's mascot, as well as Dickie V integration where Dick Vitale offers his take on the features of the game and gives gamers hints in Dynasty Mode on recruiting. The player can also import their draft class to NBA Live 2004. However, the players are given fictional names after they are imported.

== Player Names ==
Players are not given names in the game because of rights of the NCAA to its players, as including names would have required the NCAA to pay the players. Players can still give the players names, and some players are recognizable, such as 2004 NBA draft prospects Josh Childress (Stanford), Ben Gordon, and Emeka Okafor (Connecticut).

== Extras ==
Extras in the game feature the cameos of NBA rookies Carmelo Anthony, Chris Bosh, and Kirk Hinrich and rowdy college fans and NCAA head coaches saying "EA Sports, It's In The Game". For added realism, NCAA head basketball coaches offer defensive and offensive strategies.

== Controls ==
The game is the first in the series to feature freestyle moves and separate buttons for dunks and layups and the ability to perform an alley-oop. Also the player can make decisions in mid-air and make adjusted shots.

== Reception ==
Reception

Aggregate score
Aggregator	Score	
Aggregator	PS2	Xbox
Metacritic	82/100	81/100

Review scores
Publication	Score	
Publication	PS2	Xbox
Electronic Gaming Monthly	8/10	8/10
Game Informer	8.25/10	8.25/10
GameRevolution	B−	B−
GameSpot	7.7/10	7.7/10
GameSpy	4/5	4/5
GameZone	8.4/10	8.5/10
IGN	8.5/10	8.4/10
Official U.S. PlayStation Magazine	4/5	N/A
Official Xbox Magazine (US)	N/A	8.9/10
X-Play	3/5	N/A

The game received "favorable" reviews on both platforms according to the review aggregation website Metacritic. Tokyo Drifter of GamePro said of the game, "By a fair margin, NCAA March Madness 2004 comes out on top in the showdown against ESPN College Basketball 2K4 [sic]. Online support for the Xbox version would have made its victory complete for this year." (Note: GamePro gave the PlayStation 2 version 4/5 for graphics, 4.5/5 for sound, and two 5/5 scores for control and fun factor, while also giving the Xbox version three 4.5/5 scores for graphics, sound, and fun factor, and 5/5 for control.)

== See also ==
- NBA Live 2004
