= NCAA Basketball 10 =

2009 video game

- Cover featuring Blake Griffin
- Developer: EA Canada
- Publisher: Electronic Arts
- Series: NCAA Basketball
- Platforms: PlayStation 3, Xbox 360
- Release: NA: November 17, 2009
- Genre: Basketball simulation
- Modes: Single-player, multiplayer

NCAA Basketball 10 is a basketball video game developed by EA Canada and published by Electronic Arts. It was released on November 17, 2009 for Xbox 360 and PlayStation 3. Former University of Oklahoma and former NBA forward Blake Griffin is featured on the cover. It is the final video game in the NCAA Basketball series.

On February 10, 2010 EA officially announced that all future NCAA Basketball games would be put on hold and that there were no plans for releasing anymore titles in 2010. That year, the game was not released on the PlayStation 2. On August 11, 2011, all online services were discontinued.

== Demo ==
A demo was released to the Xbox 360 marketplace on November 5, 2009, and on the PlayStation Network on November 19, 2009. It featured North Carolina and Duke in one five-minute half at Cameron Indoor Stadium.

== Features ==
- New authentic broadcasting presentations of ESPN and CBS Sports, featuring announcing crews of Dick Vitale, Brad Nessler, and Erin Andrews for ESPN, and Gus Johnson and Bill Raftery for CBS Sports.
- Users are now able to choose from multiple offenses that include the Dribble Drive, Princeton, Flex and others.
- The game features the 20 Toughest Places to Play as voted by the fans
- Real-life RPI ratings and stats from every Division I school are imported into the game every week.
- The game features more than 100 improvements including player movement, rebounding, off-ball collisions, alley-oops, size-ups, and more.
- Improved Coach Feedback System and Team Tempo Control enables users to execute their gameplan to perfection.
- Dynasty mode enhancements

The game includes 325 of the 353 schools in NCAA Division I. Nine Programs that are fully classified as D-I were left out as well as 13 transitional programs. Division II Chaminade is playable in the included Maui Invitational Tournament.

EA intended to release the game with the same 64 historical teams that were included in NCAA Basketball 09, but due to issues brought about by the O'Bannon v. NCAA lawsuit filed by former UCLA & NBA player Ed O'Bannon, they were removed from the game prior to release.

== Reception ==
Reception

Aggregate score
Aggregator	Score	
Aggregator	PS3	Xbox 360
Metacritic	75/100	75/100

Review scores
Publication	Score	
Publication	PS3	Xbox 360
1Up.com	B	B
Game Informer	7.25/10	7.25/10
GameSpot	7/10	7/10
GameTrailers	N/A	7.5/10
GameZone	8.2/10	8.2/10
IGN	7.8/10	7.8/10
Official Xbox Magazine (US)	N/A	7/10
PlayStation: The Official Magazine	4/5	N/A
TeamXbox	N/A	7.5/10
411Mania	N/A	7/10

NCAA Basketball 10 was well received on both platforms upon release. Review aggregation website Metacritic rated the game a 75 out of 100, indicating "generally positive reviews."

== See also ==
- NBA Live 10
