= NCAA Basketball (series) =

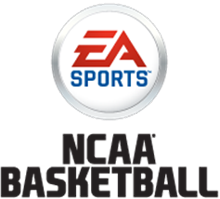
- Genres: Sports (basketball)
- Developers: Electronic Arts, EA Canada
- Publisher: EA Sports
- Platforms: PlayStation, PlayStation 2, Xbox, Xbox 360, PlayStation 3
- First release: NCAA March Madness 98; February 25, 1998
- Latest release: NCAA Basketball 10; November 17, 2009

NCAA Basketball (formerly NCAA March Madness) is a series of college basketball video games that was published by EA Sports from 1998 until 2009. After EA Sports' rival publisher 2K Sports cancelled its own college basketball game, College Hoops, in 2008, EA changed the name of the series from NCAA March Madness to NCAA Basketball. The series was discontinued on February 10, 2010.

It was released on PlayStation, PlayStation 2, Xbox, Xbox 360 and PlayStation 3. Like other games based on NCAA sports, it could not feature the players' names (as that is against NCAA policy/rules), so only the players' numbers were used in the rosters. Users were able to edit the rosters, putting in the correct names for each team if they wished to do so. Many player last names were built into the in-game commentary, like in the NBA Live series.

Verne Lundquist, Brad Nessler, and Gus Johnson lent their voices for play-by-play in the games at various times. Lundquist was the original announcer, with Nessler taking over in the mid-2000s and Johnson joining him for the most recent game in the series. Bill Raftery and Dick Vitale were analysts. Raftery originally worked with Lundquist on their games and returned to work alongside Johnson for CBS-branded games in NCAA Basketball 10, while Vitale and Nessler joined the series at the same time.

On June 30, 2025, EA Sports announced the return of the series. However, it was scrapped out on September 5, 2025, as schools have chosen to work on 2K Sports instead.

== Games ==
=== NCAA March Madness 98 ===
NCAA March Madness 98 is the 1997 installment in the NCAA March Madness series. It was released on February 28, 1998, for the PlayStation. Former Wake Forest player and retired San Antonio Spurs player Tim Duncan is featured on the cover.

=== NCAA March Madness 99 ===
NCAA March Madness 99 is the 1998 installment in the NCAA March Madness series. It was released on December 18, 1998, for the PlayStation. Former North Carolina player Antawn Jamison is featured on the cover.

=== NCAA March Madness 2000 ===
NCAA March Madness 2000 is the 1999 installment in the NCAA March Madness series. It was released in December 1999 for the PlayStation. Former Maryland player Steve Francis is featured on the cover.

=== NCAA March Madness 2001 ===
NCAA March Madness 2001 is the 2000 installment in the NCAA March Madness series. It was released on December 7, 2000, for PlayStation. Former Cincinnati and NBA player Kenyon Martin is featured on the cover.

=== NCAA March Madness 2002 ===
NCAA March Madness 2002 is the 2001 installment in the NCAA March Madness series. It was released on January 9, 2002, for PlayStation 2. Former Duke player and former Miami Heat player Shane Battier is featured on the cover.

=== NCAA March Madness 2003 ===
NCAA March Madness 2003 is the 2002 installment in the NCAA March Madness series. It was released on November 21, 2002, for PlayStation 2. Former Kansas Jayhawks player Drew Gooden is featured on the cover. The game's cover shows deformities within the artwork.

=== NCAA March Madness 2004 ===
NCAA March Madness 2004 is the 2003 installment in the NCAA March Madness series. It was released on November 17, 2003, for PlayStation 2 and Xbox. Former Syracuse player Carmelo Anthony is featured on the cover. Commentary is done by Brad Nessler and "Mr. College Basketball" Dick Vitale as he is introduced in the game. This is the first time the player can pick their favorite school and the menus are stylized in the school's colors and a cheerleader or mascot can appear on the main menu while playing the school's fight song. The game plays similar to NBA Live 2004.

=== NCAA March Madness 2005 ===
NCAA March Madness 2005 is the 2004 installment in the NCAA March Madness series. It was released on November 16, 2004, for PlayStation 2 and Xbox. Former Connecticut and NBA player Emeka Okafor is featured on the cover.

=== NCAA March Madness 06 ===
NCAA March Madness 06 is the 2005 installment in the NCAA March Madness series. It was released on October 12, 2005, for PlayStation 2 and Xbox. Former North Carolina player Raymond Felton is featured on the cover.

=== NCAA March Madness 07 ===
NCAA March Madness 07 is the 2006 installment in the NCAA March Madness series. It was released on January 17, 2007, for PlayStation 2 and Xbox 360. Former Gonzaga player Adam Morrison is featured on the cover.

=== NCAA March Madness 08 ===
NCAA March Madness 08 is the 2007 installment in the NCAA March Madness series. It was released on December 11, 2007, for PlayStation 3, PlayStation 2, and Xbox 360. Former University of Texas and current Houston Rockets forward Kevin Durant is featured on the cover. It was the only March Madness game to debut for the PlayStation 3 until the name change.

=== NCAA Basketball 09 ===
NCAA Basketball 09 is the 2008 installment in the NCAA College Basketball series. It was released on November 17, 2008, for the PlayStation 3, PlayStation 2, and Xbox 360. The cover featured former UCLA and current Utah Jazz forward Kevin Love.

=== NCAA Basketball 10 ===
NCAA Basketball 10 is a basketball video game developed by EA Canada and published by EA Sports. It was released November 17, 2009 on Xbox 360 and PlayStation 3. Former University of Oklahoma forward Blake Griffin was featured on the cover.

The NCAA Basketball series was discontinued after NCAA Basketball 10.

== Cover Athletes ==
List of Standard Cover Star
Game	Cover Star			
Game	Name	Team	Position	NBA Draft Pick
NCAA March Madness 98	Tim Duncan	Wake Forest	Power forward	1st overall (1997)
NCAA March Madness 99	Antawn Jamison	North Carolina	Power forward	4th overall (1998)
NCAA March Madness 2000	Steve Francis	Maryland	Point guard	2nd overall (1999)
NCAA March Madness 2001	Kenyon Martin	Cincinnati	Power forward	1st overall (2000)
NCAA March Madness 2002	Shane Battier	Duke	Small forward	6th overall (2001)
NCAA March Madness 2003	Drew Gooden	Kansas	Power forward	4th overall (2002)
NCAA March Madness 2004	Carmelo Anthony	Syracuse	Small forward	3rd overall (2003)
NCAA March Madness 2005	Emeka Okafor	Connecticut	Center	2nd overall (2004)
NCAA March Madness 06	Raymond Felton	North Carolina	Point guard	5th overall (2005)
NCAA March Madness 07	Adam Morrison	Gonzaga	Small forward	3rd overall (2006)
NCAA March Madness 08	Kevin Durant	Texas	Small forward	2nd overall (2007)
NCAA Basketball 09	Kevin Love	UCLA	Power forward	5th overall (2008)
NCAA Basketball 10	Blake Griffin	Oklahoma	Power forward	1st overall (2009)

== Discontinuation ==
The series had used likenesses of college athletes, threatening their amateur statuses. The amateur rules of collegiate sports overruled any claim that the athletes had towards compensation based on the Likeness Licensing Litigation; there is a contractual agreement made when scholarships are given out to do this.
