= NBA Action '95 =

1995 video game

NBA Action '95: Starring David Robinson
- North American cover art
- Developer: Double Diamond Sports
- Publisher: Sega
- Director: Michael Brook
- Programmers: Stephen L. Cox; Chris Ziomkowski
- Artists: Joseph Quinn; Douglas Wike; Lori Champney
- Composer: Andy Armer
- Series: NBA Action
- Platform: Sega Genesis
- Release: EU: April 21, 1995; NA: 1995
- Genres: Sports (Basketball)
- Modes: Single-player, multiplayer

NBA Action '95: Starring David Robinson is a sports video game developed by American studio Double Diamond Sports and published by Sega for the Sega Genesis in 1995.

== Gameplay ==
NBA Action '95 is a basketball game featuring complete player rosters for all 27 NBA teams, and allows for playing the full season with playoffs and finals, and includes a trade option.

== Development ==
NBA Action '95 was developed by Double Diamond Sports with production being led by the studio's co-founder Michael Brook. A former designer at EA Sports and creative assistant to Electronic Arts founder and president Trip Hawkins, Brook left his former company to give himself a better opportunity to create his own Sega Genesis basketball game. Double Diamond was formed with programmer Mark Lesser to develop sports titles for both EA and its competitor Sega and to challenge EA's then-upcoming basketball release NBA Live 95. The new developer quickly acquired contracts for NHL '95, NFL '95, and NBA Action '95, all with similar deadlines.

Wishing the project to be a fresh take on home basketball simulation, Brook had numerous ideas in mind for NBA Action '95. It was not meant to be a direct continuation of NBA Action '94, though both games did feature the voice of New York Knicks broadcaster Marv Albert for play-by-play commentary. The initial in-house design team consisted of programmer Steven L. Cox and artists Doug Wike and Lori Champney. Programmer Chris Ziomkowski was brought in to help with the peripheral screens after NHL '95 wrapped while another artist, Joe Quinn, was hired from outside to provide additional animation. After fine-tuning the graphics, the team managed to match it to the viewing perspective they desired and satisfy Sega.

While most basketball games at the time had either a horizontal or diagonal camera perspective, NBA Action '95 opted for a vertically-scrolling, overhead view similar to NHL '94. In Brook's own words, "The idea was that you'd be able to run a fast break from the back of the court with the point guard and move him up the court." Brook appreciated the artists giving the player sprites heights and hair that matched their real-life counterparts to make then more distinguishable from one another. Player sizes also factored into the game's foul system.

Brook named other features as innovations including proper button timing for successful jump shots, a steal button, and numerous animations and outcomes for when a ball hits the rim. "The idea was to take a game like basketball and understand what elements were the ones that drew in gamers on all levels," Brook said. One feature that did not make it into the final version was one-touch shooting, in which player could immediately take a shot after receiving a pass. However, the mechanic broke in the last week of development and it was not implemented.

== Reception ==
Reception

Review scores
Publication	Score
Electronic Gaming Monthly	12/20
GamePro	3.25/5
Next Generation	2/5
Consolemania	76/100
Game Power	45/100
Joypad	79%
MAN!AC	79%
Mega Fun	74%
Mega Play	60%
Play Time	74%
Player One	84%
Power Unlimited	5/10
Sega Power	65%
Sega Pro	73/100
Superjuegos	80/100
Video Games (DE)	84%
VideoGames	8/10

Next Generation reviewed the game, rating it two stars out of five, and stated that "the small players and generic animation leave this game more than just a bucket short of the playoffs."
