= Fair Pay to Play Act =

Bill to allow college athletes to profit while in school

California State Legislature
- Full name: Fair Pay to Play Act
- Introduced: February 4, 2019
- Assembly voted: September 9, 2019
- Senate voted: May 22, 2019
- Signed into law: September 30, 2019
- Sponsor(s): Sens. Nancy Skinner, Scott Wilk, Steven Bradford
- Governor: Gavin Newsom
- Code: Education Code
- Resolution: SB 206
- Website: leginfo.legislature.ca.gov

Status: Current legislation

The Fair Pay to Play Act, originally known as California Senate Bill 206, is a California statute that allows collegiate athletes to acquire endorsements and sponsorships while still maintaining athletic eligibility. The bill affects college athletes in California's public universities and colleges.

== History ==
The bill was introduced by Senator Nancy Skinner and co-authored by Scott Wilk and Steven Bradford. The bill passed the California State Senate 31 to 5, with Shannon Grove voting against the bill, on May 22, 2019, with the California Assembly unanimously passing it on September 11, 2019. The bill was bolstered by testimony from former Stanford women's volleyball star and 2015 national freshman of the year Hayley Hodson, and Oklahoma State University football star Russell Okung.

The impetus for the bill came when Skinner met antitrust economist Andy Schwarz. Schwarz had been involved in the O'Bannon litigation and was looking for a new way to advance athletes' rights after that case had resulted in only modest gains.

The Supreme Court's recent decision in NCAA v. Alston sheds light on modern federal attitudes towards student athlete compensation.[2] In this case, the Court struck down any potential limitations on education-related benefits that student athletes may receive.[2] Most notably, the Court—and especially Justice Brett Kavanaugh—rejected the NCAA's "amateurism" argument as an overly broad and outdated defense for failing to allow its revenue-drivers (i.e., student athletes) to receive compensation. The NCAA contended that the Court should defer to its amateurism model because it is a joint venture along with its member schools, but the Court instead reasoned that deference was inappropriate since the NCAA has a monopoly in the relevant market. The Court further rejected the NCAA's appeal that it was not a "commercial enterprise," noting the "highly profitable" and "professional" nature of certain college sports. Shortly after the Court's decision in Alston, the NCAA issued an interim name, image, and likeness policy which permits student athletes to earn this type of compensation. States have also followed suit by enacting their own laws. For example, Illinois Public Law 102-0042 permits athlete to receive market-value compensation for use of their name, image, and likeness.

Gavin Newsom signed the bill into law on September 30, 2019. The law was scheduled to go into effect in 2023, but was moved up to an effective date of September 1, 2021 thus enabling student-athletes to own their own name, image, and likeness, and profit from them, just like any other college student or citizen can.
