= O'Bannon v. NCAA =

2015 US federal appeals court case

- Court: United States Court of Appeals for the Ninth Circuit
- Full case name: Edward C. O'Bannon, Jr., On Behalf of Himself and All Others Similarly Situated v. National Collegiate Athletic Association, aka The NCAA
- Decided: September 30, 2015
- Citation: 802 F.3d 1049

Case history
- Prior actions: O'Bannon v. Nat'l Collegiate Athletic Ass'n, 7 F. Supp. 3d 955 (N.D. Cal. 2014)
- Appealed from: United States District Court for the Northern District of California
- Appealed to: Supreme Court of the United States
- Subsequent actions: Cert. denied, 137 S. Ct. 277 (2016); Motion for attorneys' fees granted, No. 4:09-cv-03329, 2016 WL 1255454 (N.D. Cal. Mar. 31, 2016), affirmed, 739 F. App'x 890 (9th Cir. 2018)

Court membership
- Judges sitting: Sidney R. Thomas, Jay S. Bybee, Gordon J. Quist

Case opinions
- Decision by: Bybee
- Concur/dissent: Thomas

O'Bannon v. NCAA, 802 F.3d 1049 (9th Cir. 2015), was an antitrust class action lawsuit filed against the National Collegiate Athletic Association (NCAA). The lawsuit, which former UCLA basketball player Ed O'Bannon filed on behalf of the NCAA's Division I football and men's basketball players, challenged the organization's use of the images and the likenesses of its former student athletes for commercial purposes. The suit argued that upon graduation, a former student athlete should become entitled to financial compensation for NCAA's commercial uses of their image. The NCAA maintained that paying its athletes would be a violation of its concept of amateurism in sports. At stake are "billions of dollars in television revenues and licensing fees".

On August 8, 2014, District Judge Claudia Wilken found for O'Bannon, holding that the NCAA's rules and bylaws operate as an unreasonable restraint of trade, in violation of antitrust law. The Court said it would separately enter an injunction regarding the specific violations found. In September 2015, the Ninth Circuit Court of Appeals affirmed, in part, and reversed, in part, the District Court's ruling. In March 2016, O'Bannon's lawyers appealed the case to the Supreme Court of the United States. The Supreme Court denied certiorari on October 3, 2016.

== History ==
In July 2009, Ed O'Bannon, a former basketball player for UCLA who was a starter on their 1995 national championship team and the NCAA Tournament Most Outstanding Player that year, filed a lawsuit against the NCAA and the Collegiate Licensing Company, alleging violations of the Sherman Antitrust Act and of actions that deprived him of his right of publicity. He agreed to be the lead plaintiff after seeing his likeness from the 1995 championship team used in the EA Sports title NCAA Basketball 09 without his permission. The game featured an unnamed UCLA player who played O'Bannon's power forward position, while also matching his height, weight, bald head, skin tone, No. 31 jersey, and left-handed shot. In January 2011, Oscar Robertson joined O'Bannon in the class action suit. Bill Russell was also among the 20 former college athletes who were plaintiffs. These athletes brought this antitrust class action against the NCAA to challenge the association's rules restricting compensation for men's football and basketball players images and likeness. In particular, the plaintiffs allege that the NCAA's rules and bylaws operate as an unreasonable restraint of trade because they preclude FBS football players and Division I men's basketball players from receiving any compensation—beyond the value of their athletic scholarships—for the use of their names, images, and likenesses in video games, live game telecasts, re-broadcasts, and archival game footage.

Electronic Arts and the Collegiate Licensing Company, both original co-defendants with the NCAA, departed from the case and finalized a $40 million settlement that could net as much as $4,000 to as many as 100,000 current and former athletes who had appeared in EA Sports' NCAA Basketball and NCAA Football series of video games since 2003.

== Trial and verdict ==
The trial lasted from June 9 to June 27, 2014. Final written closing statements were submitted on July 10.

On August 8, 2014, Wilken ruled that the NCAA's long-held practice of barring payments to athletes violated antitrust laws. She ordered that schools should be allowed to offer full cost-of-attendance scholarships to athletes, covering cost-of-living expenses that were not currently part of NCAA scholarships. Wilken also ruled that college be permitted to place as much as $5,000 into a trust for each athlete per year of eligibility.

The NCAA subsequently appealed the ruling, arguing that Wilken did not properly consider NCAA v. Board of Regents of the University of Oklahoma. In that case, the NCAA was denied control of college football television rights. The Supreme Court denied the NCAA's appeal. The NCAA was also ordered to pay the plaintiffs $42.2 million in fees and costs.

== Aftermath ==
As a result of O'Bannon, a number of other class-action lawsuits filed by student athletes against the NCAA and colleges followed, challenging other restrictions on educational funds as being anti-competitive. These were combined into a single suit also heard by Judge Wilken, who ruled against the NCAA in March 2019 and required the NCAA to allow students to obtain other non-cash scholarships, internships and other support beyond the full cost of attendance for academic purposes. Some of these benefits include private tutoring, advanced class selection and access to exclusive college benefits. The court worried that allowing college athletes to profit off their name and likeness would allow large schools with large fanbases to offer more money to players. These non-cash benefits are services all colleges can provide which makes the competitive landscape to recruit talent fair for all colleges.

The Ninth Circuit upheld the ruling on appeal, which the Supreme Court affirmed in a unanimous decision in June 2021 in National Collegiate Athletic Association v. Alston. On July 1, 2021, the NCAA announced the board had agreed to new rules that removed restrictions on college athletes from entering paid endorsements and other sponsorship deals, and from using agents to manage their publicity. Students would still be required to inform the school of all such activities, with the school to make determinations if those activities violate state and local laws.

EA Sports, which had published the NCAA-sports based games, left that market; NCAA Basketball 10 (published in 2009) was the final game in that series, while the NCAA terminated its license with EA during the events of O'Bannon after the release of NCAA Football 14 (published in 2013) over licensing rates. EA rebooted its college football video game series in 2024 with EA Sports College Football 25. Player likenesses are included in the game.
