= NBA Give 'n Go =

1995 video game

NBA Give 'N Go NBA Jikkyou Basket: Winning Dunk
- The box art for North American release, including an inset of the arcade version of the game.
- Developer: Konami
- Publisher: Konami
- Director: Dr. Lee
- Producer: Dr. Lee
- Programmer: Akihide Tanimura (arcade)
- Artists: Strawberry, Acky, Neo Monkey, Ricky, Champion Lover X (arcade)
- Composers: Mariko Egawa, Mutsuhiko Izumi, Tsutomu Ogura (arcade)
- Platform: Super Nintendo
- Release: JP: September 29, 1995; NA: November 1995; EU: 1995
- Genres: Sports; Arcade basketball
- Modes: Single-player, multiplayer

NBA Give 'N Go is a 1995 Super Nintendo Entertainment System basketball video game that uses licensed teams from the National Basketball Association. The game is essentially a home version of Konami's arcade game Run and Gun, which featured similar graphics and gameplay but no NBA license. Konami followed up Give 'N Go with Run and Gun 2 and the NBA In The Zone series.

== Gameplay ==
NBA Give 'N Go screenshot - the Denver Nuggets play the San Antonio Spurs.

Similar to Run and Gun, the in-game camera is at one end of the basketball court. Gameplay is fast-paced, much like NBA Jam and Konami's own Run and Gun. Elements lifted from arcade basketball games included limited fouls (that automatically lead to free throw shots), faster than real time clock, and basketballs rarely travel out of bounds. Free throw shots are simply a manner of trying to get two dots in the center as possible. The shot always goes in as long as both dots are blue; otherwise the shot always misses.

Gaming options include exhibition, regular season, playoffs, and arcade mode. Certain slam dunks and three-point field goal shots are replayed periodically. A play-by-play announcer comments on the in-game action. In addition to an arcade-style game, players can also customize in-game rules, or play a full-fledged simulation of professional basketball.

Players who wish to play in the playoff mode can choose either to re-enact the 1995 NBA Playoffs, have their playoff tree randomized by the computer or customize their own NBA playoff experience. Regular season games can also be customized while games in the "arcade mode" use the 1995 NBA Playoffs. Players can be substituted before a game but not during it. All NBA players are evaluated on a scale of zero to three stars; with three stars being the highest rating. Shaquille O'Neal & Charles Barkley are missing from the game's rosters. Michael Jordan had retired from professional basketball at the time, so he also does not appear in this game.

== Differences between versions ==
The game was released in Japan as NBA Jikkyou Basket: Winning Dunk (ＮＢＡ実況バスケットウイニングダンク, NBA Live Basukett Ouining Udanku). Localization and translation from Japanese to English were performed by veteran translator of Japanese television programs Jeremy Blaustein, while working in Tokyo as one of the staff members responsible for this game. During the early 1990s, Blaustein also translated other Konami Super Famicom games from Japanese to English.

Passwords are used to save regular seasons in the American version while the Japanese version uses a battery save.

== Reception ==
A reviewer for Next Generation, while warning gamers not to "expect perfection" due to the "unpredictable" controls, praised the fast pace, use of real teams and players, smooth animation, and graphics. He gave it three out of five stars. Contradicting Next Generation, Super Dizzy Jet of GamePro said the controls are responsive and the game suffers from a sluggish pace, with players moving around the court very slowly. He also criticized the graphics, citing choppy animation, graphical breakup, and difficulty determining where offscreen teammates are.

== See also ==
- Double Dribble (video game) - an earlier basketball game by Konami
