= NuFX =

American video game developer

- Type: Subsidiary
- Industry: Video games
- Founded: 1990; 36 years ago
- Founder: Lou Haehn; Pat Quinn
- Defunct: February 2004
- Fate: Merged and folded into EA Chicago
- Headquarters: Hoffman Estates, Illinois, United States
- Products: Beavis and Butthead; PGA Tour series NBA Live series NBA Street series

NuFX was a video game developer, headquartered in Hoffman Estates, Illinois, United States. The studio is known for developing the NBA Street video game series, as well as Fight Night 2004, a continuation of the Knockout Kings series. NuFX also worked on the NCAA March Madness, NBA LIVE and FIFA Soccer series. The studio was acquired by Electronic Arts in February 2004 and merged into EA's operations to create EA Chicago.

== History ==
NuFX was founded in 1990 by Louis Haehn and Patrick Quinn, headquartered in Hoffman Estates, Illinois. By 2000, the company had more than 20 developers and had developed games for Atari, Sega, and EA. In 2003, the studio began working on a new Knockout Kings game. This would eventually evolve into Fight Night 2004. By 2004, NuFX had developed 15 games for Electronic Arts.

After a run of success working on NBA Street, NBA Street Vol. 2, and Fight Night 2004, NuFX was acquired by Electronic Arts in February 2004. Soon after, the company was restructured as EA Chicago. Fight Night producer Kudo Tsunoda moved from EA Vancouver to serve as the new studio's general manager. Its first project was Fight Night Round 2. By 2006, EA Chicago had expanded from 38 to 130 developers across two locations in Hoffman Estates and downtown Chicago. In October 2006, Def Jam: Icon, developed by EA Chicago, was announced for PlayStation 3 and Xbox 360 with a March 2007 release date.

In July 2007, EA announced that the Chicago team would be developing a fighting game based on Marvel Comics characters. The game was due to release in 2008. However, EA Chicago faced development issues, and was ultimately shut down in November as part of an effort to reduce its workforce by 4%. In a leaked internal memo, the company referenced Chicago's expansion from 49 people in 2004 to 146 people and a new facility in downtown Chicago just three years later as a factor. other factors were the poor performance of Def Jam: Icon earlier that year and the fact that EA didn't see the studio becoming profitable until at least 2011. The game was cancelled after a year and a half of development. With EA looking to get out of licensed games, it terminated the deal with Marvel in January 2008.

Soon after the closure of EA Chicago, 27 team members formed a new studio, called Robomodo. The company's first project was published by Activision.

== Games developed ==
Year	Title	Platform(s)	Refs
1990	Rygar	Atari Lynx	
1990	Robo-Squash	Atari Lynx	
1991	Hard Drivin'	Atari Lynx	
1991	Xybots	Atari Lynx	
1991	Turbo Sub	Atari Lynx	
1992	Crüe Ball	Sega Genesis	
1992	Hydra	Atari Lynx	
1992	Steel Talons	Atari Lynx	
1992	Taz-Mania	Game Gear	
1993	Super Baseball 2020	Sega Genesis	
1993	Surf Ninjas	Game Gear	
1994	MTV's Beavis and Butt-Head	Game Gear	
1995	PGA Tour 96	3DO	
1995	PGA Tour 96	Sega Genesis (Note: Assisted Hitmen Productions)	
1996	Fatal Fury 3: Road to the Final Victory	Microsoft Windows (Note: Assisted Kinesoft)	
1996	NBA Live 97	Sega Genesis	
1996	NBA Live 97	SNES	
1997	Aaron vs. Ruth: Battle of the Big Bats	Microsoft Windows	
1997	PGA Tour 98	PlayStation	
1998	NBA Live 99	Nintendo 64	
1999	NBA Live 2000	Nintendo 64	
2000	NBA Live 2001	PlayStation	
2001	NBA Live 2002	PlayStation	
2001	NBA Street	PlayStation 2	
2002	NBA Live 2003	PlayStation	
2002	NCAA March Madness 2002	PlayStation 2	
2002	NCAA March Madness 2003	PlayStation 2	
2003	FIFA Football 2004	PlayStation	
2003	NBA Street Vol. 2	GameCube	
2003	NBA Street Vol. 2	PlayStation 2	
2003	NBA Street Vol. 2	Xbox	
2003	NCAA March Madness 2004	PlayStation 2	
2004	Fight Night 2004	PlayStation 2 (Note: Assisted EA Canada)	
2004	Fight Night 2004	Xbox (Note: Assisted EA Canada)	
