= NCAA March Madness 98 =

1998 video game

- Developer: Electronic Arts
- Publisher: Electronic Arts Sports
- Series: NCAA March Madness
- Platform: PlayStation
- Release: NA: February 25, 1998
- Genres: Sports, Basketball
- Modes: Single-player, multiplayer

NCAA March Madness 98 is the first installment in the NCAA March Madness series. It was released on February 25, 1998 for the PlayStation. It is the sequel to Coach K College Basketball. Former Wake Forest player Tim Duncan is featured on the cover.

== Gameplay ==
NCAA March Madness 98 uses the crowds as a gameplay mechanic. A "Momentum Meter" responds to a team scoring consecutive baskets or making a big play, upon which the crowd roars and the players of the momentum-gaining team receive a temporary boost to their abilities.

== Development ==
NCAA March Madness 98 was built with a revamped version of the NBA Live 97 game engine, utilizing that game's animation data with the addition of a few new motion captured moves from Tim Duncan and others. Developer Electronic Arts consulted with collegiate coach Lou Carnesecca in designing the game's artificial intelligence.

Beta versions of the game featured a Conference Tournament Mode and a Dynasty Mode which let players manage and play using a team over a number of years, requiring them to replace graduating seniors with freshmen players. Both of these modes were left out of the completed game due to time constraints.

A PC version of the game was in development but was cancelled.

== Reception ==
Reception

Aggregate score
Aggregator	Score
GameRankings	76%

Review scores
Publication	Score
AllGame	2.5/5
Electronic Gaming Monthly	7.125/10 (Note: Three critics of Electronic Gaming Monthly gave the game each a score of 7/10, and the other game it 7.5/10.)
Game Informer	7.75/10
GameFan	88%
GameRevolution	B+
GameSpot	6.9/10
IGN	6.5/10
Next Generation	2/5
Official U.S. PlayStation Magazine	4/5

Most reviews for NCAA March Madness 98 were mixed. Critics widely agreed that the game succeeded in capturing the fundamental differences of college basketball, with more evenly-matched players than standard basketball video games and all-around more team-oriented play. GameSpot said that the game "lets college basketball fans who understand the college game apply what they know, like running a good half-court offense and changing up defenses to keep teams off their rhythm." IGN applauded, "March Madness is built on the premise that if you absolutely love the crazy high created in the post-season games of college basketball, and you love real team ball and all of the strategies that come with it, you should go head-over heels for this game. A full court press, hand-baskets of fast passing, recognizable offensive formations, and evenly distributed talent in each of the players are characteristics that make this game great."

However, critics also concurred that the use of the NBA Live 97 engine resulted in a game which is graphically outdated, particularly against its contemporary NBA Live 98. Next Generation added that the enhanced animation of NCAA March Madness 98, when run through the aging NBA Live 97 engine, results in a lower frame rate that makes the game feel slow and choppy. IGN described the graphics as "surprisingly blurry, fuzzy, and as muddy as any Nintendo 64 game." GamePro was more forgiving, saying that though the graphics are not as polished as NBA Live 98, they do not detract from the excitement and gameplay.

Most reviewers described the A.I. as being challenging and in particular resistant to the strategies which normally work in pro basketball video games, but Electronic Gaming Monthly (EGM) and GameSpot both found the defensive A.I. is too weak. EGM and GameSpot both also complained that the crowd noise is underwhelming and unrealistically quiets down shortly after a dunk. Multiple critics praised the innovation of the momentum meter and the inclusion of women's teams, though IGN added that the impact of having women's teams is blunted by the fact that they play the same as the men's teams.

GamePro gave the game 4 out of 5 in graphics, 4.5 for both sound and control, and a perfect 5 for fun factor, summing up, "To win consistently in MM, you need to learn the intricacies of the game, from executing successful give-and-gos to calling the correct offensive and defensive sets. The end result is unparalleled depth, realism, and, more importantly, fun." By contrast, Next Generation called it "an overwhelmingly mediocre game in which what was done well is overshadowed by shortcomings." EGM were more in the middle, saying that the game could have been much better in more than one area but was still a worthy effort at recreating college basketball which was worth buying. Game Informer similarly said that it was not a top end basketball game but would satisfy fans of college basketball. The game held a 76% on the review aggregation website GameRankings based on four reviews.

== See also ==
- NBA Live 98
