= Ed O'Bannon =

American basketball player (born 1972)

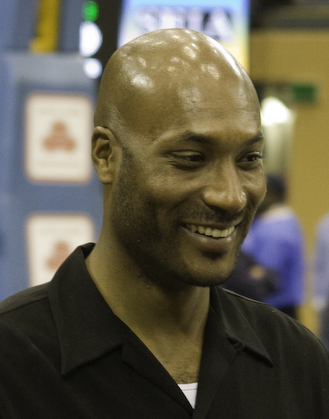
- O'Bannon in 2008

Personal information
- Born: August 14, 1972 (age 54) Los Angeles, California, U.S.
- Listed height: 6 ft 8 in (2.03 m)
- Listed weight: 222 lb (101 kg)

Career information
- High school: Artesia (Lakewood, California)
- College: UCLA (1991–1995)
- NBA draft: 1995: 1st round, 9th overall pick
- Drafted by: New Jersey Nets
- Playing career: 1995–2004
- Position: Power forward
- Number: 31

Career history
- 1995–1997: New Jersey Nets
- 1997: Dallas Mavericks
- 1998: La Crosse Bobcats
- 1998: Acegas A.P.S. Trieste
- 1998–1999: CB Valladolid
- 1999–2000: Rethymno Aegean
- 1999–2000: Boca Juniors
- 2000–2001: Los Angeles Stars
- 2001–2002: Anwil Włocławek
- 2002–2003: Polonia Warszawa
- 2003–2004: Ostromecko Astoria Bydgoszcz

Career highlights
- NCAA champion (1995); NCAA Final Four Most Outstanding Player (1995); USBWA College Player of the Year (1995); John R. Wooden Award (1995); Pac-10 co-Player of the Year (1995); Consensus first-team All-American (1995); Third-team All-American – NABC (1994); 3× First-team All-Pac-10 (1993–1995); No. 31 retired by UCLA Bruins; McDonald's All-American (1990); 2× First-team Parade All-American (1989, 1990); California Mr. Basketball (1990)

Career NBA statistics
- Points: 634 (5.0 ppg)
- Rebounds: 316 (2.5 rpg)
- Assists: 102 (0.8 apg)
- Stats at NBA.com
- Stats at Basketball Reference
Medals
Men's basketball
Representing United States
FIBA Americas U18 Championship
Gold medal – first place	1990 Montevideo	National team
Summer Universiade
Gold medal – first place	1993 Buffalo	National team

Edward Charles O'Bannon Jr. (born August 14, 1972) is an American former professional basketball player in the National Basketball Association (NBA). He was a power forward for the UCLA Bruins on their 1995 NCAA championship team. He was selected by the New Jersey Nets with the ninth overall pick of the 1995 NBA draft. After two seasons in the NBA, he continued his professional career for another eight years, mainly playing in Europe.

O'Bannon was the lead plaintiff in O'Bannon v. NCAA, an antitrust class action lawsuit against the National Collegiate Athletic Association which resulted in the discontinuation of NCAA video games.

== Early life ==
O'Bannon grew up in South Los Angeles and attended Verbum Dei High School before graduating from Artesia High School. He averaged 24.6 points, 9.7 rebounds in his senior year at Artesia. He led the school to a 29–2 record that year, and they won the California Interscholastic Federation (CIF) Division II state championship. He was the most valuable player (MVP) at the Dapper Dan Classic, a high school All-Star game, and he was named a McDonald's High School All-American. He was also honored by Basketball Times as its national high school player of the year.

== College career ==
O'Bannon originally planned to attend the University of Nevada, Las Vegas (UNLV), but he did not sign a letter of intent with the university at the suggestion of UNLV head coach Jerry Tarkanian. However, when UNLV's men's basketball program was placed on probation due to recruiting improprieties, O'Bannon rescinded his commitment and instead attended UCLA.

Six days before the official start of practice at UCLA, O'Bannon tore his anterior cruciate ligament as he landed awkwardly on a dunk during a pickup game with other Bruins. He was told he might not be able to walk properly again, but eighteen months later, after receiving a graft from a cadaver, he returned to playing basketball. In his first year, he came off the bench in 23 games and averaged fewer than four points while never starting. In his second season in 1993, O'Bannon was named to the first team All-Pacific-10 (Pac-10) Conference team. In his junior year, he was named the team's MVP and was again first team All-Pac-10. In his senior year in 1994–95, O'Bannon was the key to UCLA's 1995 NCAA Basketball Championship, scoring 30 points and taking 17 rebounds and was named the NCAA Tournament Most Outstanding Player. For the season, he averaged 20.4 points (.533 field-goal percentage, .433 3-point percentage) and 8.3 rebounds, earning him the John R. Wooden Award, USBWA College Player of the Year (now Oscar Robertson Trophy), and the CBS/Chevrolet Player of the Year. He was a consensus first team All-American, Pac-10 co-Player of the Year along with Damon Stoudamire, first team All-Pac-10 for the third consecutive year, and UCLA's co-MVP along with Tyus Edney.

His number 31 was retired by UCLA in 1996. He was also inducted into UCLA Athletics Hall of Fame in 2005, and the Pac-12 Basketball Hall of Honor in 2012.

== NBA career ==
Leading up to the 1995 NBA draft, O'Bannon hoped to be drafted by a team on the west coast. He was generally projected to be selected fifth or sixth overall, but his stock fell after reports of an arthritic condition on his reconstructed left knee. He was selected ninth overall by the New Jersey Nets and signed a three-year, $3.9 million contract. However, he became homesick. In his two NBA seasons, O'Bannon was unable to find a place in the league, being too lean to play down low and not quick enough with his rebuilt knees to guard the perimeter. His knee also started to break down. He averaged 6.2 and 4.2 points per game respectively with the Nets and was traded to the Dallas Mavericks later in his second and final NBA season, where he had even less of an impact. In September 1997 he was traded along with Derek Harper to the Orlando Magic for Dennis Scott, and was waived by the Magic afterwards. "It wasn't injury, it was confidence," O'Bannon said about his NBA career. "I missed shots, got pulled from games, it affected my defense, and I lost all my confidence." Former Nets teammate Armon Gilliam said, "He's a guy who didn't find his niche in the NBA. He wasn't in the right situation to grow and develop. He never got the opportunity to prove what he could do."

== Career in Europe and the ABA ==
After his NBA career, O'Bannon played professional basketball seven years overseas in Italy, Spain, Greece, Argentina and Poland (in Anwil Włocławek, Polonia Warsaw and Astoria Bydgoszcz). He also played one year for the startup American Basketball Association (ABA) with the Los Angeles Stars. After the NBA, he only had one-year contracts and never made more than $400,000 in a season. He decided to retire at age 32 after undergoing arthroscopic knee surgery. When he made his decision, he was in the process of trying out for a team in China but realized he had no more motivation to play the game. Furthermore, the people holding the tryouts had never even heard of him.

In his professional career, O'Bannon said he "played for 12 different teams in at least six countries and for 15 different coaches."

== Subsequent career ==
As of 2009, O'Bannon was employed as a marketing director for a Las Vegas auto dealership. In 2006, while employed as a salesman at the dealership, O'Bannon told the Los Angeles Times, "People see me and remember me and I'm proud to tell them—'No, I don't play. No, I don't coach. Yes, I sell cars.'" By 2020, he had become a probation officer in Las Vegas.

O'Bannon was a volunteer coach at Green Valley High School in Henderson, Nevada. In 2009, citing a renewed interest in basketball due to his children, O'Bannon accepted an offer to become the head coach of the boys' basketball team at Henderson International School.

== Class action against NCAA ==
O'Bannon was the lead plaintiff in O'Bannon v. NCAA, an antitrust class action lawsuit filed against the National Collegiate Athletic Association (NCAA) on behalf of its Division I football and men's basketball players over the organization's use for commercial purposes of the images of its former student athletes. The suit argued that upon graduation, a former student athlete should become entitled to financial compensation for future commercial uses of his or her image by the NCAA. In January 2011, Oscar Robertson, considered one of the greatest basketball players of all time, joined O'Bannon in the class action suit. On August 8, 2014, Judge Claudia Wilken ruled that the NCAA's long-held practice of barring payments to athletes violated anti-trust laws.

In March 2015, O'Bannon appeared in a faux commercial on Last Week Tonight with John Oliver on HBO that criticized the NCAA's payment practices regarding student athletes. With March Madness approaching, the commercial featured a fake video game named March Sadness 2015 that mocked the experiences of college basketball players in relation to the NCAA. "This game is every bit as fucked up as the real thing," stated O'Bannon in the segment. In 2018, he published a book about his fight with the NCAA, Court Justice: The Inside Story of My Battle Against the NCAA. O'Bannon supported the Fair Pay to Play Act, a California law that allows college athletes to receive endorsement deals.

After the Supreme Court ruled in National Collegiate Athletic Association v. Alston that the NCAA restricted trade in violation of the Sherman Antitrust Act, the NCAA allowed athletes to be compensated for their name, image and likeness.

== Personal life ==
O'Bannon attended UNLV to continue earning his bachelor's degree. In the summer of 2011, O'Bannon returned to UCLA to complete his studies, and he graduated in the fall that year with a degree in history.

O'Bannon is the older brother of Charles, who won the championship with him at UCLA and went on to play for the Detroit Pistons. His half-brother Turhon O'Bannon played college football for the New Mexico Lobos and professionally for the Winnipeg Blue Bombers in the Canadian Football League.

O'Bannon lives in Henderson, Nevada, with his wife, Rosa, and their three children. His daughter Jazmin played college basketball at UNLV.

== NBA career statistics ==
Year	Team	GP	GS	MPG	FG%	3P%	FT%	RPG	APG	SPG	BPG	PPG
1995–96	New Jersey	64	29	19.6	.390	.179	.713	2.6	1.0	0.7	0.2	6.2
1996–97	New Jersey	45	5	14.1	.367	.283	.870	2.5	0.6	0.5	0.2	4.2
1996–97	Dallas	19	0	9.2	.236	.100	.917	1.9	0.6	0.3	0.1	2.4
Career		128	34	16.1	.367	.222	.755	2.5	0.8	0.6	0.2	5.0

== Publications ==
- O'Bannon, Ed; McCann, Michael (2018). Court Justice: The Inside Story of My Battle Against the NCAA. Diversion Books. ISBN 978-1635762624.
