= NCAA March Madness 08 =

2007 video game

NCAA March Madness '08
- Developer: EA Canada
- Publisher: Electronic Arts
- Series: NCAA March Madness
- Platforms: PlayStation 3, PlayStation 2, Xbox 360
- Release: NA: December 11, 2007
- Genre: Sports
- Modes: Single-player, multiplayer

NCAA March Madness 08 is the 2007 installment in the NCAA March Madness series. Former University of Texas and current Houston rockets forward Kevin Durant is featured on the cover. It was the only March Madness game available for the PlayStation 3 until the name change.

== Features ==
- New "Dynamic Post Control".
- New recruiting system modeled after NCAA Football 08. Players are searchable by position, type, and size.
- The new "EA Sports Lockdown Stick" enables players to pressure the ball, force turnovers and harass opponents on the court.
- Dynasty mode enhancements include the pre and post season NIT and the McDonald's High School All American game.
- More authentic arenas.
- New player models with form-fitting uniforms.
- Breakaway basketball hoop rims.
- Custom playbooks.
- ESPN on Demand.

== Reception ==
Reception

Aggregate score
Aggregator	Score		
Aggregator	PS2	PS3	Xbox 360
Metacritic	56/100	67/100	69/100

Review scores
Publication	Score		
Publication	PS2	PS3	Xbox 360
Electronic Gaming Monthly	N/A	6.67/10	6.67/10
Game Informer	N/A	7.25/10	7.25/10
GameSpot	N/A	6/10	6.5/10
GameTrailers	N/A	7.9/10	7.9/10
GameZone	N/A	N/A	7.5/10
IGN	4.9/10	6.9/10	7.4/10
Official Xbox Magazine (US)	N/A	N/A	7/10
PlayStation: The Official Magazine	N/A	3.5/5	N/A
TeamXbox	N/A	N/A	7.9/10
Maxim	N/A	4/5	4/5
The New York Times	N/A	(average)	(average)

The game received "mixed or average reviews" on all platforms according to the review aggregation website Metacritic.

== See also ==
- NBA Live 08
