= NCAA March Madness 2005 =

2004 video game

- Developer: EA Canada
- Publisher: EA Sports
- Series: NCAA March Madness
- Platforms: PlayStation 2, Xbox
- Release: NA: November 16, 2004
- Genre: Sports
- Modes: Single-player, multiplayer

NCAA March Madness 2005 is the 2004 installment in the NCAA March Madness series. Former Connecticut, Charlotte Bobcats, New Orleans Hornets, Washington Wizards, and New Orleans Pelicans player Emeka Okafor is featured on the cover.

== Soundtrack ==
The soundtrack of the game uses college band versions of licensed songs. The songs used are "Last Resort" by Papa Roach, "Hey Mama" by The Black Eyed Peas, "Day-O" by Harry Belafonte, "The Middle" by Jimmy Eat World, "A Little Less Conversation" by Elvis Presley, "Hanging by a Moment" by Lifehouse and "Disco Inferno" by The Trammps.

== Reception ==
Reception

Aggregate score
Aggregator	Score	
Aggregator	PS2	Xbox
Metacritic	78/100	80/100

Review scores
Publication	Score	
Publication	PS2	Xbox
Electronic Gaming Monthly	8.17/10	8.17/10
Game Informer	8.25/10	8.25/10
GamePro	4.5/5	4.5/5
GameRevolution	C+	C+
GameSpot	7.1/10	7.1/10
GameSpy	4/5	4/5
GameZone	8.4/10	8.5/10
IGN	8.6/10	8.6/10
Official U.S. PlayStation Magazine	3.5/5	N/A
Official Xbox Magazine (US)	N/A	8.2/10

The game received "generally favorable reviews" on both platforms according to the review aggregation website Metacritic.

== See also ==
- NBA Live 2005
