= National Collegiate Athletic Association v. Alston =

National Collegiate Athletic Association v. Alston American Athletic Conference v. Alston
- Supreme Court of the United States

Argued March 31, 2021 Decided June 21, 2021
- Full case name: National Collegiate Athletic Association v. Shawne Alston, et al. American Athletic Conference, et al. v. Shawne Alston, et al.
- Docket nos.: 20-512; 20-520
- Citations: 594 U.S. 69 (more) 141 S. Ct. 2141; 210 L. Ed. 2d 314

Case history
- Prior: Judgment for plaintiffs, In re Nat'l Collegiate Athletic Ass'n Athletic Grant-in-Aid Cap Antitrust Litig., 375 F. Supp. 3d 1058 (N.D. Cal. 2019); Affirmed, 958 F.3d 1239 (9th Cir. 2020); Cert. granted (Dec. 16, 2020)

Holding
- Upholding as consistent with antitrust principles an injunction that prohibited the enforcement of certain NCAA rules that limited education-related benefits for student-athletes.

Court membership
- Chief Justice John Roberts Associate Justices Clarence Thomas · Stephen Breyer; Samuel Alito · Sonia Sotomayor; Elena Kagan · Neil Gorsuch; Brett Kavanaugh · Amy Coney Barrett

Case opinions
- Majority: Gorsuch, joined by unanimous
- Concurrence: Kavanaugh

Laws applied
- Sherman Act

National Collegiate Athletic Association v. Alston, 594 U.S. 69 (2021), was a United States Supreme Court case concerning the compensation of collegiate athletes within the National Collegiate Athletic Association (NCAA). It followed from a previous case, O'Bannon v. NCAA, in which it was found that the NCAA was profiting from the names and likenesses of college athletes. The case dealt with the NCAA's restrictions on providing college athletes with non-cash compensation for academic-related purposes, such as computers and internships, which the NCAA maintained was to prevent the appearance that the student athletes were being paid to play or treated as professional athletes. Lower courts had ruled that these restrictions violated antitrust law, which the Supreme Court affirmed in a unanimous ruling in June 2021.

== Background ==
The National Collegiate Athletic Association (NCAA) oversees rules related to student athletes who play in their athletics programs. These athletic programs are generally seen as revenue generation for the individual school, particularly for the popular college football and basketball programs which are widely televised and marketed. Because the school benefits from the performance of the players, the NCAA had established rules to limit the type of compensation that the school could give to student athletes as to distinguish college athletics from professional sports.

In 2014, a class-action lawsuit O'Bannon v. NCAA was filed in the United States District Court for the Northern District of California. The plaintiffs, numerous college athletes, asserted that the NCAA and its colleges were profiting from their names and likeness in works related to the college athletic programs such as in video games but none of the athletes were receiving any compensation for that pay, in violation of the Sherman Antitrust Act. District Court judge Claudia Ann Wilken found for the plaintiffs, a decision upheld in part by the Ninth Circuit.

Subsequently, the NCAA had started review of its policies related to how to compensate players for names and likenesses, as well as the impact of California's Fair Pay to Play Act passed in October 2019 and due for enforcement in 2023 which would allow students to have more control on their names and likenesses for sponsorships and endorsements beyond the NCAA's control.

Subsequent to O'Bannon, a number of additional lawsuits challenging the NCAA's restrictions on educational compensation for athletes were raised, led by Shawne Alston and Justine Hartman. The cases were combined into NCAA v. Alston at the Northern District Court of California. Judge Wilken, also hearing this case, issued her decision in March 2019, ruling against the NCAA that their restrictions on "non-cash education-related benefits" violated antitrust law under the Sherman Antitrust Act and required the NCAA to allow for certain types of academic benefits beyond the previously established full scholarships from O'Bannon, such as for "computers, science equipment, musical instruments and other tangible items not included in the cost of attendance calculation but nonetheless related to the pursuit of academic studies". The ruling barred the NCAA from preventing athletes from receiving "post-eligibility scholarships to complete undergraduate or graduate degrees at any school; scholarships to attend vocational school; tutoring; expenses related to studying abroad that are not included in the cost of attendance calculation; and paid post-eligibility internships". Wilken's ruling also established that the conferences within the NCAA may set other allowances. The NCAA may still limit cash or cash-equivalent awards for academic purposes under the ruling. Wilken rationalized her ruling bases on the large differences in compensation that the NCAA receives from the student athletes' performance to what the students themselves receive. Wilken's ruling did not limit what individual athletic conferences may restrict in terms of compensation.

The NCAA appealed Wilken's ruling to the Ninth Circuit. The three-judge Ninth Circuit panel ruled in May 2020 to uphold the District Court's decision. The panel did agree that the NCAA had a necessary interest in "preserving amateurism and thus improving consumer choice by maintaining a distinction between college and professional sports", but their practices still violated antitrust law. Judge Milan Smith wrote "The treatment of Student-Athletes is not the result of free market competition. To the contrary, it is the result of a cartel of buyers acting in concert to artificially depress the price that sellers could otherwise receive for their services. Our antitrust laws were originally meant to prohibit exactly this sort of distortion."

== Supreme Court ==
The upheld decision went into effect in August 2020. The NCAA along with the American Athletic Conference filed petitions to the Supreme Court in October 2020 to hear their appeal. Both asked the Court to review the Ninth Circuit's decision, arguing that the decision created a new definition of items that could be "related to education" which could be abused by colleges and sponsors to create effective "pay for play" programs in all but name, such as a hypothetical US$500,000-a-semester "internship" with Nike that the NCAA described as "the antithesis of amateurism". The Supreme Court granted certiorari to both petitions in December 2020, consolidating the two petitions into NCAA v. Alston.

Oral arguments were heard on March 31, 2021, with observers stating that the Justices in general appeared to agree with arguments made by the students against the NCAA regulations but expressed concern about the potential effects of weakening the NCAA's objective of maintaining the appearance of amateur play within their leagues.

The Supreme Court issued its decision on June 21, 2021. The decision was unanimous, affirming the Ninth Circuit's ruling, with Justice Neil Gorsuch writing the opinion. Gorsuch wrote that the lower courts' decision is consistent with established antitrust principles, and thus the Court upheld the ruling, but did not attempt to make any judgment on the aspect related to whether student athletes should receive further pay as this was beyond the remit of the court. Gorsuch acknowledged that "some will see this as a poor substitute for fuller relief" in addressing the apparent discrepancy of compensation between student athletes and the coaches and administrators of the NCAA.

Justice Brett Kavanaugh wrote a concurring opinion, stating that antitrust laws "should not be a cover for exploitation of the student athletes." Kavanaugh's opinion also spoke to other NCAA regulations that he believed "also raise serious questions under the antitrust laws" and would be struck down if challenged under the same legal principles used by the lower courts in Alston.

== Legal impact ==
This ruling only concerned education-related payments and did not address restrictions on direct compensation payment to athletes. However, it also opened the door for the possibility of future court cases concerning this matter.

The changes from this court decision will cause many NCAA-affiliated athletic departments to adapt accordingly. A large part of this responsibility will be to keep the standard of Title IX as new opportunities for athletes to receive compensation appear. The title disallows sex-based discrimination and calls for equal opportunity for student-athletes. "For example, if a school allows its male basketball players to make money from their NIL (Note: name, image, or likeness), they must also allow female athletes to do the same."

The decision came as several states were on the verge of passing laws to give student athletes more control over the use of their likeness, and the U.S. Congress had been mulling legislation to provide better compensation for student athletes after years of inaction by the NCAA. President Joe Biden stated that he "believes that everyone should be compensated fairly for his or her labor", while Senate Commerce Chair Maria Cantwell said the ruling gave "new urgency" to their legislative efforts. The NCAA's then-president Mark Emmert said that the ruling affirms the association's efforts to qualify what counts as educational benefits, and that "we remain committed to working with Congress to chart a path forward, which is a point the Supreme Court expressly stated in its ruling."

== See also ==
- University of Southern California athletics scandal
- Southern Methodist University football scandal
