= NCAA March Madness 2001 =

2000 video game

- Developer(s): Black Ops Entertainment
- Publisher(s): EA Sports
- Series: NCAA March Madness
- Platform(s): PlayStation
- Release: NA: December 7, 2000
- Genre(s): Sports
- Mode(s): Single-player, multiplayer

NCAA March Madness 2001 is the 2000 installment in the NCAA March Madness series. Former Cincinnati player Kenyon Martin is featured on the cover.

== Reception ==
Reception

Aggregate score
Aggregator	Score
Metacritic	71/100

Review scores
Publication	Score
CNET Gamecenter	6/10
Electronic Gaming Monthly	4.17/10
Game Informer	8.25/10
GameSpot	8.3/10
GameZone	8.5/10
IGN	8.4/10
Official U.S. PlayStation Magazine	2/5 stars
Maxim	3/5 stars

The game received "average" reviews according to the review aggregation website Metacritic.

== See also ==
- NBA Live 2001
