= NCAA March Madness 99 =

- Developer: EA Sports
- Publisher: EA Sports
- Series: NCAA March Madness
- Platform: PlayStation
- Release: NA: December 15, 1998
- Genre: Sports
- Modes: Single-player, multiplayer

NCAA March Madness 99 is the 1998 installment in the NCAA March Madness series. Former North Carolina player Antawn Jamison is featured on the cover.

== Reception ==
Reception

Aggregate score
Aggregator	Score
GameRankings	63%

Review scores
Publication	Score
AllGame	2/5
Electronic Gaming Monthly	6.75/10
Game Informer	5.75/10
GameFan	89%
GamePro	4/5
GameRevolution	C−
GameSpot	6/10
IGN	7.4/10
Official U.S. PlayStation Magazine	3/5

The game received mixed reviews according to the review aggregation website GameRankings.

== See also ==
- NBA Live 99
