= NCAA March Madness 2003 =

2002 PS2 video game

- Developer: NuFX
- Publisher: EA Sports
- Series: NCAA March Madness
- Platform: PlayStation 2
- Release: NA: November 21, 2002
- Genre: Sports
- Modes: Single-player, multiplayer

NCAA March Madness 2003 is the 2002 installment in the NCAA March Madness series. Drew Gooden, who won National Player of the Year while playing at Kansas, is featured on the cover. The game's cover shows deformities within the artwork.

== Reception ==
Reception

Aggregate score
Aggregator	Score
Metacritic	74/100

Review scores
Publication	Score
Electronic Gaming Monthly	7.5/10
Game Informer	8/10
GamePro	4.5/5
GameSpot	7.3/10
GameZone	7.6/10
IGN	7.1/10
Official U.S. PlayStation Magazine	3/5
PlayStation: The Official Magazine	7/10

The game received "average" reviews according to the review aggregation website Metacritic.
