= NCAA March Madness 07 =

NCAA March Madness '07
- Developer: EA Canada
- Publisher: EA Sports
- Series: NCAA March Madness
- Platforms: PlayStation 2, Xbox 360
- Release: NA: January 17, 2007
- Genre: Sports
- Modes: Single-player, multiplayer, multiplayer online

NCAA March Madness 07 is the 2006 installment in the NCAA March Madness series. Former Gonzaga player Adam Morrison is featured on the cover.

== Features ==
- Using a new dynamic crowd environment, the game features a noticeable difference between high-energy schools such as Kentucky, Indiana, Duke, or North Carolina as opposed to smaller, more subdued crowds for less schools with less popular basketball programs. Having a winning program will unlock a pep band, a student section, and a cheerleading squad to help motivate the players on the floor. The team behind March Madness 2007 has worked to make sure that the location of all 325 school bands and student sections are as authentic as possible.
- The ability to upgrade facilities makes it possible to upgrade the player's program's success throughout the game. By completing challenges throughout the season, such as winning the home-opener or signing high-profile recruits lets players upgrade the facilities of your program, including a practice gym, a weight room, a study hall, and an injury clinic. With better facilities, players are more likely to land that prized recruit.
- The ability to interact with the crowd, opponents and teammates allows the player to raise the intensity of the arena by performing well. Inversely, performing poorly will lower the intensity making it difficult to make a comeback. Intensity points earned can be used to interact with the mascot, the cheerleaders, the pep band, or the crowd.

== Reception ==
Reception

Aggregate score
Aggregator	Score	
Aggregator	PS2	Xbox 360
Metacritic	63/100	67/100

Review scores
Publication	Score	
Publication	PS2	Xbox 360
Electronic Gaming Monthly	N/A	6.33/10
Game Informer	N/A	7.75/10
GameRevolution	N/A	D
GameSpot	6.4/10	6.7/10
GameSpy	2/5	N/A
GameTrailers	N/A	6.3/10
GameZone	6.9/10	8.5/10
IGN	5.9/10	7.9/10
Official Xbox Magazine (US)	N/A	6/10
PlayStation: The Official Magazine	8/10	N/A
The A.V. Club	B	B
Detroit Free Press	N/A	3/4

The game received "mixed or average reviews" on both platforms according to the review aggregation website Metacritic.

The A.V. Club gave it a B and called it "Sweet Sixteen gameplay with a Final Four atmosphere." Detroit Free Press gave the Xbox 360 version three stars out of four, stating, "From a strong matchmaking system to a deep dynasty mode that largely mirrors EA's NCAA football game, March Madness does a good job bringing the energy of college hoops home." However, 411Mania gave the PS2 version six out of ten, calling it "a mediocre game that has some good gameplay elements mixed in with some fun modes. However, it has numerous problems that might lead some astray."

== See also ==
- NBA Live 07
