= NCAA March Madness 06 =

2005 video game

NCAA March Madness '06
- Developer: EA Canada
- Publisher: EA Sports
- Series: NCAA March Madness
- Platforms: PlayStation 2, Xbox
- Release: NA: October 12, 2005
- Genre: Sports
- Modes: Single-player, multiplayer

NCAA March Madness 06 is the 2005 installment in the NCAA March Madness video games series. The former North Carolina and former NBA player Raymond Felton is featured on the cover.

The game features online multiplayer. The online servers were shut down by EA on September 1, 2007

== Soundtrack ==
The soundtrack uses college band versions of licensed songs. The songs used are "Waiting" by Not Forgotten, "Still Running" by Chevelle, "Because of You" by Nickelback, "Bundy" by Animal Alpha and "Paralyzer" by Finger Eleven.

== Reception ==
Reception

Aggregate score
Aggregator	Score	
Aggregator	PS2	Xbox
Metacritic	78/100	76/100

Review scores
Publication	Score	
Publication	PS2	Xbox
Electronic Gaming Monthly	8/10	8/10
Game Informer	7/10	7/10
GamePro	4/5	N/A
GameRevolution	C+	C+
GameSpot	7/10	7/10
GameSpy	4/5	4/5
GameZone	8.1/10	7.9/10
IGN	8.7/10	8.7/10
Official U.S. PlayStation Magazine	4/5	N/A
Official Xbox Magazine (US)	N/A	6/10

The game received "generally favorable reviews" on both platforms according to the review aggregation website Metacritic.

== See also ==
- NBA Live 06
