= Flick NBA Basketball =

2009 video game

- Developer(s): Freeverse
- Publisher(s): Freeverse
- Series: Flick Sports
- Platform(s): iOS
- Release: April 27, 2009
- Mode(s): Single-player

Flick NBA Basketball is a basketball video game developed and published by Freeverse. It was released on April 27, 2009, for the iOS. The game was the first for the platform to be officially licensed by the NBA and is a part of Freeverse's Flick Sports series of games.
