= NCAA March Madness 2002 =

- Developer: NuFX
- Publisher: EA Sports
- Series: NCAA March Madness
- Platform: PlayStation 2
- Release: NA: January 9, 2002
- Genre: Sports
- Modes: Single-player, multiplayer

NCAA March Madness 2002 is the 2001 installment in the NCAA March Madness series. Former Duke and Miami Heat player Shane Battier is featured on the cover.

== Modes ==
- Create-a-Player
- Single Game
- First College basketball game for the PlayStation 2
- Tournament Mode
- Roster Management

== Reception ==
Reception

Aggregate score
Aggregator	Score
Metacritic	54/100

Review scores
Publication	Score
Electronic Gaming Monthly	4.33/10
Game Informer	4.75/10
GamePro	3.5/5
GameSpot	7/10
GameSpy	(unfavorable)
GameZone	6.8/10
IGN	5/10
Official U.S. PlayStation Magazine	3/5
PlayStation: The Official Magazine	4/10
Maxim	1/5

The game received "mixed" reviews according to the review aggregation website Metacritic.

== See also ==
- NBA Live 2002
