= NCAA March Madness 2000 =

1999 video game

- Developer: Black Ops Entertainment
- Publisher: EA Sports
- Series: NCAA March Madness
- Platform: PlayStation
- Release: NA: December 1999
- Genre: Sports
- Modes: Single-player, multiplayer

NCAA March Madness 2000 is the 1999 installment in the NCAA March Madness series. Former Maryland player Steve Francis is featured on the cover.

== Reception ==
Reception

Aggregate score
Aggregator	Score
GameRankings	79%

Review scores
Publication	Score
AllGame	2/5
Electronic Gaming Monthly	8.375/10
Game Informer	8.25/10
GameFan	152/200
GamePro	5/5
GameRevolution	B
GameSpot	8.9/10
IGN	9.1/10
Official U.S. PlayStation Magazine	4/5
The Cincinnati Enquirer	3.5/4

The game received favorable reviews according to the review aggregation website GameRankings.

== See also ==
- NBA Live 2000
