= Gus Johnson (sportscaster) =

American sportscaster (born 1967)

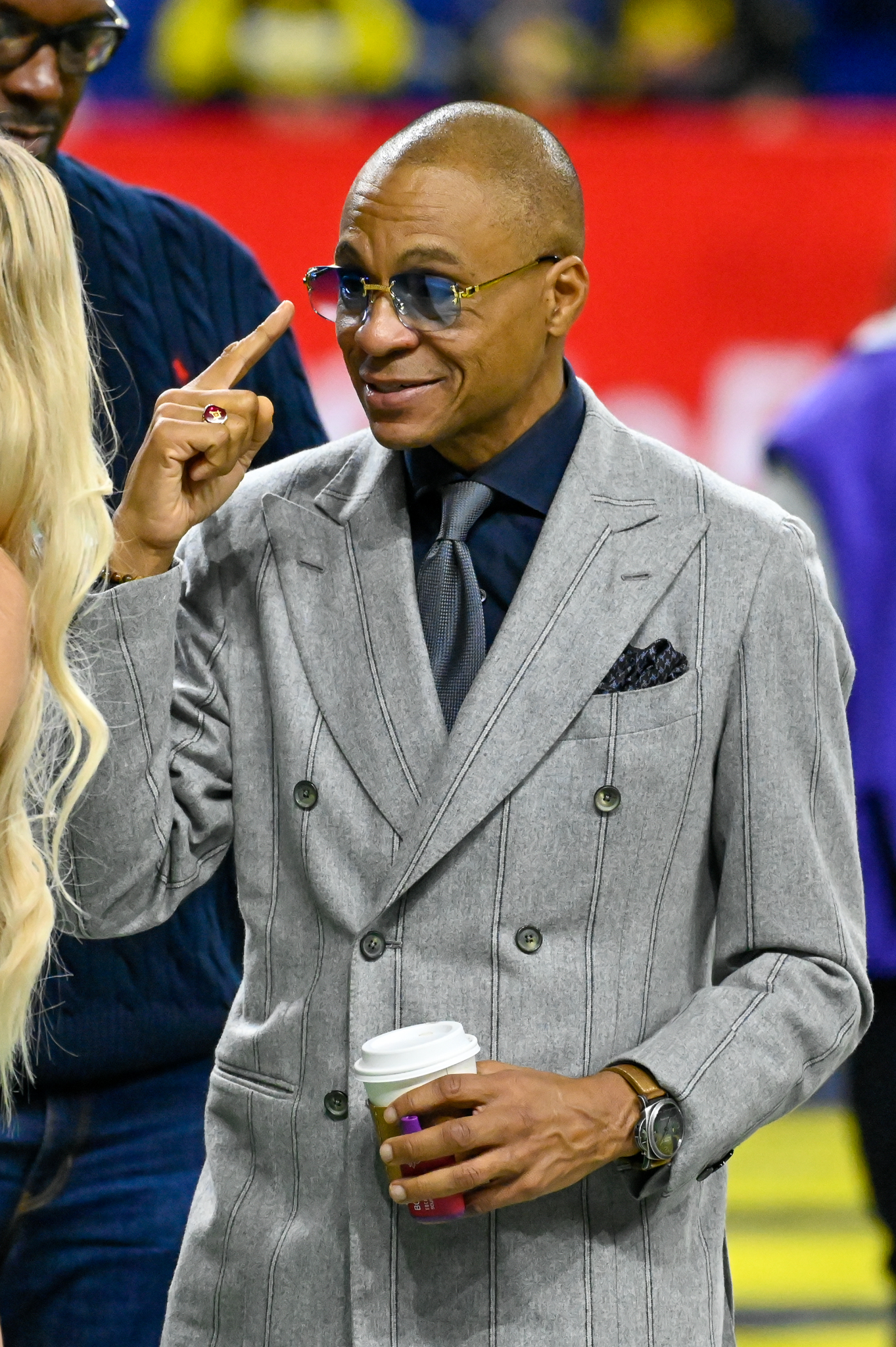
- Johnson in 2023
- Born: Augustus Cornelius Johnson Jr. August 10, 1967 (age 59); Detroit, Michigan, U.S.
- Education: Howard University
- Occupation: Sports commentator
- Sports commentary career
- Genre: Play-by-play
- Sports: Basketball; American football; Boxing; Mixed martial arts
- Employer: CBS Sports (1995–2011); Big Ten Network (2008–2011); Showtime Sports (2008–2011); Fox Sports (2011–present); TNT Sports (2022–present)

Augustus Cornelius Johnson Jr. (born August 10, 1967) is an American sportscaster. He is the lead play-by-play announcer for Fox Sports calling college football and college basketball. Prior to working with Fox, he was with CBS Sports. He also called select NBA playoff games for NBA on TNT and NBA TV. He is known for his highly enthusiastic and energetic style of playcalling.

== Early life and education ==
Johnson was born in Detroit, Michigan. He is a Catholic. He graduated from the University of Detroit Jesuit High School and Academy in 1985, where he played baseball, basketball, and football. Johnson attended Howard University, where he played on the baseball team all four years and graduated in 1990 with a degree in political science.

In 2022, Johnson enrolled in Harvard University's Advanced Leadership Initiative. A documentary chronicling his progress in the yearlong program was subsequently broadcast on Fox Sports.

== Career ==
=== Early career ===
Johnson called play-by-play for the NBA's Minnesota Timberwolves (1996–97), Big East basketball on the Big East Network, college hockey and college basketball on ESPN and Canadian Football League games for ESPN2, and NFL games for CBS from 1998 to 2010.

Johnson hosted ESPN's Black College Sports Today in 1991. After brief stints as an on-air personality with KXXV-TV in Waco, Texas, WAAY-TV in Huntsville, Alabama, and WXII-TV in Winston-Salem, North Carolina, he served as the weekend anchor for WTTG in Washington, D.C. from 1991 to 1992. He also had a small cameo as an announcer in the 1998 film He Got Game.

=== Roles ===
Johnson called play-by-play for numerous sports for CBS Sports, including the network's coverage of March Madness from 1996 to 2011. Among the memorable games that Johnson has called are UCLA's 17-point comeback over Gonzaga in 2006, the double-overtime Xavier vs. Kansas State game on March 25, 2010, and George Mason's upset of Villanova in 2011. He also announced the Big Ten Network's Sunday night basketball games.

Johnson worked for the Madison Square Garden Network (MSG) from 1994 to 2010, where he was the radio and backup television play-by-play announcer for the NBA's New York Knicks and the television play-by-play announcer for the WNBA's New York Liberty. Johnson has also hosted MSG studio shows focused on the Yankees, Rangers and Knicks. He called 20 Milwaukee Bucks games during the 2015–16 season on Fox Sports Wisconsin. Johnson also handled play-by-play duties for the inaugural season of BIG3 basketball.

He has announced preseason television games for the NFL's Baltimore Ravens, Buffalo Bills, Philadelphia Eagles and Detroit Lions as well as the Arena Football League's New York Dragons.

Johnson has called MSG's coverage of the Golden Gloves as well as Showtime Championship Boxing on Showtime, replacing longtime voice Steve Albert. Johnson was also a mixed martial arts commentator for both EliteXC and Strikeforce through until 2011. Johnson drew scorn for his commentary during the Kimbo Slice vs. Seth Petruzelli fight, in which he announced that the fight was "the most incredible victory in the history of mixed martial arts."

Johnson has lent his voice for the play-by-play commentary in the video games NCAA Basketball 10, Madden NFL 11 and Madden NFL 12. He was also heard as the play-by-play announcer for the fictional football games seen in commercials for Buffalo Wild Wings.

Before the 2010–11 NBA season, Johnson left MSG Network to spend more time with his son. CBS released him on May 5, 2011, following a contract dispute. On May 9, 2011, he finalized a deal to call college football and NFL telecasts for Fox Sports.

In 2012, Johnson served as radio play-by-play announcer of Major League Soccer's San Jose Earthquakes. He was named the lead Fox Soccer play-by-play announcer that year calling Barclays Premier League, FA Cup, and UEFA Champions League matches. His first soccer match was the UEFA Champions League round of 16 match on February 13, 2013. He then called the 2013 FA Cup final and the 2013 UEFA Champions League final, both held at Wembley Stadium. He then repeated this feat in both finals within a week apart, both along with color commentator and former USMNT star Eric Wynalda, except this time the 2014 UEFA Champions League final was played at Estadio da Luz in Lisbon, but he stepped down from that role on September 15, 2014.

In August 2021, Fox Sports announced that Johnson would announce "select" NFL games for the 2021 season with former NFL player Aqib Talib.

Johnson worked as a play-by-play announcer for the first round of the 2022 NBA Playoffs for TNT and NBA TV and did it again the next year. Johnson also worked the first round of the NBA playoffs for NBA TV in 2024 and 1 game for TNT with Jim Jackson and sideline reporter Dennis Scott.

Johnson returned to MSG Network to fill-in sporadically when both Mike Breen and Breen's backup, Kenny Albert, are unable to call games due to national game commitments starting with the 2023-24 NBA season.

== Announcing style ==
Johnson's high-energy style is polarizing, with some critics opining that Johnson's exuberance can overshadow the games he is calling, though ESPN's Bill Simmons wrote that Johnson "could make a chess match sound exciting." Johnson's signature phrases include emphatic uses of "pure!" and "count it!" Despite being known for his catchphrases, Johnson also utilizes silence at opportune times to let television viewers absorb the moment, such as during a 2015 college football matchup between Notre Dame and Stanford when Stanford kicked the game-winning field goal at the end of a high-scoring game.

=== Notable calls ===
December 16, 2001 – Johnson was the main play-by-play announcer alongside color analyst Brent Jones for the now-infamous Bottlegate incident between the Cleveland Browns and Jacksonville Jaguars where Browns fans threw plastic beer bottles onto the field following the referees going back two plays to reverse a call via instant replay, which is against NFL rules.

March 23, 2006 – During the 2006 NCAA Division I men's basketball tournament, Johnson was calling the Sweet 16 matchup between UCLA and Gonzaga. Gonzaga held a 71–70 lead with just 19.7 seconds left in the game, needing to wind the clock down while passing the ball in from its own side of the court:

Johnson: They throw it to Morrison. He holds on.
Analyst Len Elmore: You don't want to foul Morrison. You make them get it over half court, you know you gotta foul- [UCLA guard Jordan Farmar steals the ball from Gonzaga forward J. P. Batista] Woah!
Johnson: And a steal! Farmar! Inside... the freshman up- [nearly inaudible over the crowd cheering as UCLA forward Luc Mbah a Moute scores a layup] Oh and they go in front! Raivio! Last chance to dance! [inaudible as Mbah a Moute steals the ball via a jump ball before Gonzaga commits a foul, leaving just over two seconds left] Mbah a Moute!
Elmore: Unbelievable!
Johnson: Oh what a game!
Elmore: Unbelievable!
Johnson: What a game!
Elmore: Unbelievable!
Johnson: UCLA! Unbelievable!
Elmore: Are you kidding me?!
Johnson: After being down by 17, heartbreak city!
Elmore: Holy mackerel!

Following this sequence, Gonzaga had one last chance to score a game-winning basket, once again throwing the ball in from its side of the court.

Johnson: In the frontcourt, Batista with THE CAATCH! [Batista shoots before the buzzer, but misses] And that's it! WHAT A COMEBACK! UCLA defeats Gonzaga 73–71 after being down by 17!

As the game wound up having a tight finish, Johnson received praise for his enthusiastic announcing, earning the nickname "Screaming Gus Johnson". The next day, CBS Sports host Greg Gumbel later joked that Johnson would be "out of the hospital" by the next game.

September 13, 2009 – Johnson was calling an NFL regular season opening game between the Cincinnati Bengals and Denver Broncos. During the waning seconds of the game, Denver, down 6–7, needed to drive down the field to get into field goal range or score a touchdown. Quarterback Kyle Orton threw a pass to receiver Brandon Marshall near the sideline. Though the ball was tipped by Bengals defender Leon Hall, it landed into the hands of Broncos receiver Brandon Stokley, who ran it in for an improbable game-winning touchdown. Johnson's call of the play is as follows:

Johnson: Second down and 10 at the 13 [yard line].
Analyst Dan Fouts: In other words, about 60 yards [to get into field goal range].

Johnson: Orton in the gun, Buckhalter right next to him. Orton… pumps again to the sideline… batted up- OH, CAUGHT! STOKLEY! DOWN THE SIDELINE! CAN HE CATCH HIM!? STOKLEY! WOW! [Pause] Touchdown Denver! Unbelievable! [pause] Oh my goodness! What a play! 87 yards! [pause] Woah!"

In a later interview on The Dan Patrick Show, Johnson later explained of the play: "I thought I was gonna have a heart attack. It was the most incredible thing. I’ve seen a lot of great things in sports. I started doing this in 1990, but I’ve never seen anything; not like in that in football. I mean wow."

November 1, 2009 – Johnson was calling another regular season NFL game, this time between the Jacksonville Jaguars and Tennessee Titans when Titans running back Chris Johnson broke away for a 52-yard touchdown. This was Johnson's call:

First down and 10... Johnson... gets a shoulder he's- WOW! Watch out! He's got gettin' away from the cops speed! Touchdown! [pause] 52 yards!

Though Johnson received some criticism for this call, it has nonetheless become one of his most famous, as Complex magazine named it his top call in 2013.

November 14, 2010 – Johnson was announcing another Jacksonville Jaguars game, this time against their AFC South rivals the Houston Texans. With 0:03 left in regulation, the score tied at 24, and the ball at midfield, the Jaguars and quarterback David Garrard had a chance to win the game and avoid a potential overtime loss. The ball was snapped, Garrard stepped into the pocket, and launched the ball 50 yards downfield into the endzone intended to his target, receiver Mike Sims-Walker. Texans safety Glover Quin batted the ball down, but the ball miraculously landed in the hands of Jaguars receiver Mike Thomas, resulting in a touchdown, a win for the Jaguars, and one of Gus Johnson’s most memorable calls:

Johnson: Garrard… steps up… fires, Mike Sims-Walker…! [Ball is batted down] Knocked down- [Ball lands in the hands of Thomas] Color commentator Steve Tasker: OH, HE CAUGHT IT! Johnson: OHH! UNBELIEVABLE! MIKE THOMAS! TOUCHDOWN, JAGS! BALLGAME! FIFTY YARDS! [Pause] WHOA!

March 12, 2011 – Johnson was announcing the 2011 Pac-10 Men's Basketball Tournament championship game between the University of Arizona and the University of Washington. The game was tied with just over 10 seconds left on the game clock as Washington point guard Isaiah Thomas stepped across the half court line:

Johnson: Shot clock turned off. Game clock at 8... He's gonna do it himself. Thomas. Shake, crossover, step baaack [Isaiah Thomas shoots the game winning shot that goes through the net as the clock expires.] Johnson: Ahhhhh! At the buzzer! Young Zeke! And Washington wins it! On a last second J! Coooold blooded!

May 11, 2013 – He was the play-by-play announcer of the 2013 FA Cup final between heavily-favored Manchester City and Wigan Athletic at Wembley Stadium, Johnson went ecstatic after Ben Watson scored the cup-winning goal in the 91st minute to complete the upset, Johnson's enthusiasm was noted:

Here's [Shaun] Maloney, [as Ben Watson head the ball towards goal], head it… OH, BEN WATSON! OFF THE BENCH, WHAT A GOAL! [Ian Wright, the color commentator, laughs] Wigan take a 1-0 lead in the 90+1 minute of the FA Cup final, MIRACLE!

May 25, 2013 – As the play-by-play announcer of the 2013 UEFA Champions League Final between Der Klassiker rivals Borussia Dortmund and Bayern Munich in the same ground, Johnson lost his mind after Bayern striker Arjen Robben scored the winning goal in the 89th minute. His enthusiasm was noted:

Here's [Franck] Ribery [passes to his teammate Arjen Robben]… To Robben! [Ball slides into the net] Arjen Robben, [as he celebrates the winning goal] YES! The Dutchman!

May 24, 2014 – One year later, he was the play-by-play announcer of the 2014 UEFA Champions League final between Madrid rivals, Real Madrid and Atletico Madrid, Johnson totally lost his mind after Sergio Ramos scored the game tying goal that forced the game into extra time and eventually win the tournament for his team, Johnson's reaction was noted:

Painful for both sides. Luka Modric [as he lobs the ball to Sergio Ramos, who heads the ball toward the goal]. Headed down, AND IN!!! RAMOS AGAIN!!! AND WE'RE LEVEL!!! [pauses] 93rd minute, Sergio Ramos!

October 17, 2017 – While calling the Ohio State–Maryland game that season, Johnson was on the play-by-play when Buckeyes' Cornerback Denzel Ward delivered a big hit on a Terrapins player. However, after the play, Ward was ejected for targeting the "defenseless" player.

During a play involving Denzel Ward, Johnson exclaimed, "You got barbecue back there? And you didn't invite me?"

April 22, 2018 – Johnson called Game 1 of the 2018 Eastern Conference First Round match-up between the Milwaukee Bucks and the Boston Celtics, where Khris Middleton hit a buzzer beating 3 to tie the game at 99 just minutes after Terry Rozier hit a 3 to put the Celtics up with 0.5 seconds left in the 4th quarter.

Here’s Antetokounmpo… looking. Middletooonnnnnn. OHHHHHHHHHHHHHHHHH!!! HE HIT IT! OHHHAHHHHHHHHHHHGHHH!! Khris Middleton! What a shot!

December 8, 2018 – Johnson called the 2018 Citi Hoops Classic match-up between the Seton Hall Pirates and the 9th ranked Kentucky Wildcats at Madison Square Garden, where Keldon Johnson took a pass from P. J. Washington and made a half-court shot at the buzzer to tie the game at 70. Johnson's call of the final seconds of regulation:

Here's P.J. Washington, he can run the baseline. Throws it, midcourt, Keldon Johnson! [buzzer sounds] OHH! HE BURIED IT! WOW! AND WE'RE – LEVEL AT 70! Whoo! Unbelieveable. And we're going to overtime… at the Garden!

September 18, 2021 – On the 50th anniversary of the "Game of the Century" between Oklahoma and Nebraska, Johnson was the play-by-play announcer when the two teams faced each other again. During the fourth quarter, Oklahoma DB D.J. Graham made a one-handed interception on fourth down, leading to a notable call by Johnson, who referenced a similar one-handed touchdown catch made by Odell Beckham Jr. in 2014:

Martinez, steps up, throws… OHH, WHAT AN INTERCEPTION! OH MY GOSH! D.J. Graham! Gimme that Odell!

September 19, 2021 – After returning to NFL duties for Fox, Johnson called the Week 2 NFL matchup between the Vikings and Cardinals, which came down to the Vikings attempting a game-winning field goal at the end of regulation, behind 34–33. The kick from Greg Joseph sailed to the right of the goalposts, leaving Johnson flabbergasted:

Good snap, clean hold, for the winnnn...OHHHHH MY GOODNESS, HE MISSED IT! (pause) UNBELIEVABLE! And the Cardinals survive...34-33! You're watching the NFL, folks! On F-O-X!"

September 26, 2021 – Merely a week later in Week 3, Johnson was assigned again to a Cardinals game, this time against the Jaguars. Cardinal placekicker Matt Prater attempted a 68-yard field goal before halftime to top his previous league record 64-yarder in 2013, with the Jaguars readying Jamal Agnew for a possible return of a miss from the end zone. With Prater's kick trajectory short (by coincidence, Justin Tucker would hit a 66-yard winner in Detroit the same day, winning the game for Baltimore and earning the record), Agnew caught the ball 109 yards away in the Jaguars end zone, setting up Johnson for an enthusiastic call of his 'kick-six' runback:

So here we go, Matt Prater, ready to attempt a 68-yarder, for NFL history. Got it up...it's short! Agnew, brings it out of the end zone. Agnew...still running. AGNEW...DOWN THE SIDELINE! AGNEW! TOUCHDOWN, JACKSONVILLE! A hundred...and...nine...yards. INCREDIBLE! [pause] Oh my goodness, watch this! (cuts to replay with Aqib Talib's analysis of the play)

Johnson's call, which had him screaming at the top of his lungs, was well received by several fans and commentators.
