= NCAA Basketball 09 =

2008 video game

- Developer: EA Canada
- Publisher: Electronic Arts
- Series: NCAA Basketball
- Platforms: PlayStation 3, PlayStation 2, Xbox 360
- Release: NA: November 17, 2008; March Madness Edition: NA: March 11, 2009
- Genre: Sports
- Modes: Single-player, multiplayer, multiplayer online

NCAA Basketball 09 is the 2008 installment in the NCAA Basketball series. It was released on November 17, 2008 for the PlayStation 3, PlayStation 2, and Xbox 360. Utah Jazz player Kevin Love (who was a UCLA forward at the time) is featured on the cover. A special edition called NCAA Basketball 09: March Madness Edition was released only for Xbox 360 on March 11, 2009.

== Reception ==
Reception

Aggregate score
Aggregator	Score		
Aggregator	PS2	PS3	Xbox 360
Metacritic	55/100	68/100	(M.M.) 74/100; 70/100

Review scores
Publication	Score		
Publication	PS2	PS3	Xbox 360
1Up.com	C+	C+	C+
Game Informer	N/A	7.25/10	7.25/10
GameSpot	N/A	7/10	7/10
GameTrailers	N/A	7/10	N/A
GameZone	5.6/10	7.4/10	7/10
IGN	5.1/10	7.1/10	7.1/10 (M.M.) 6.5/10
Official Xbox Magazine (US)	N/A	N/A	6.5/10
PlayStation: The Official Magazine	N/A	3.5/5	N/A
TeamXbox	N/A	N/A	(M.M.) 9.1/10; 8.1/10
X-Play	N/A	N/A	3/5

The game received "mixed or average reviews" on all platforms according to the review aggregation website Metacritic.

After seeing his likeness in this game, used without his permission, Ed O'Bannon agreed to be the lead plaintiff in O'Bannon v. NCAA.

== See also ==
- NBA Live 09
