= Emeka Okafor =

American basketball player (born 1982)

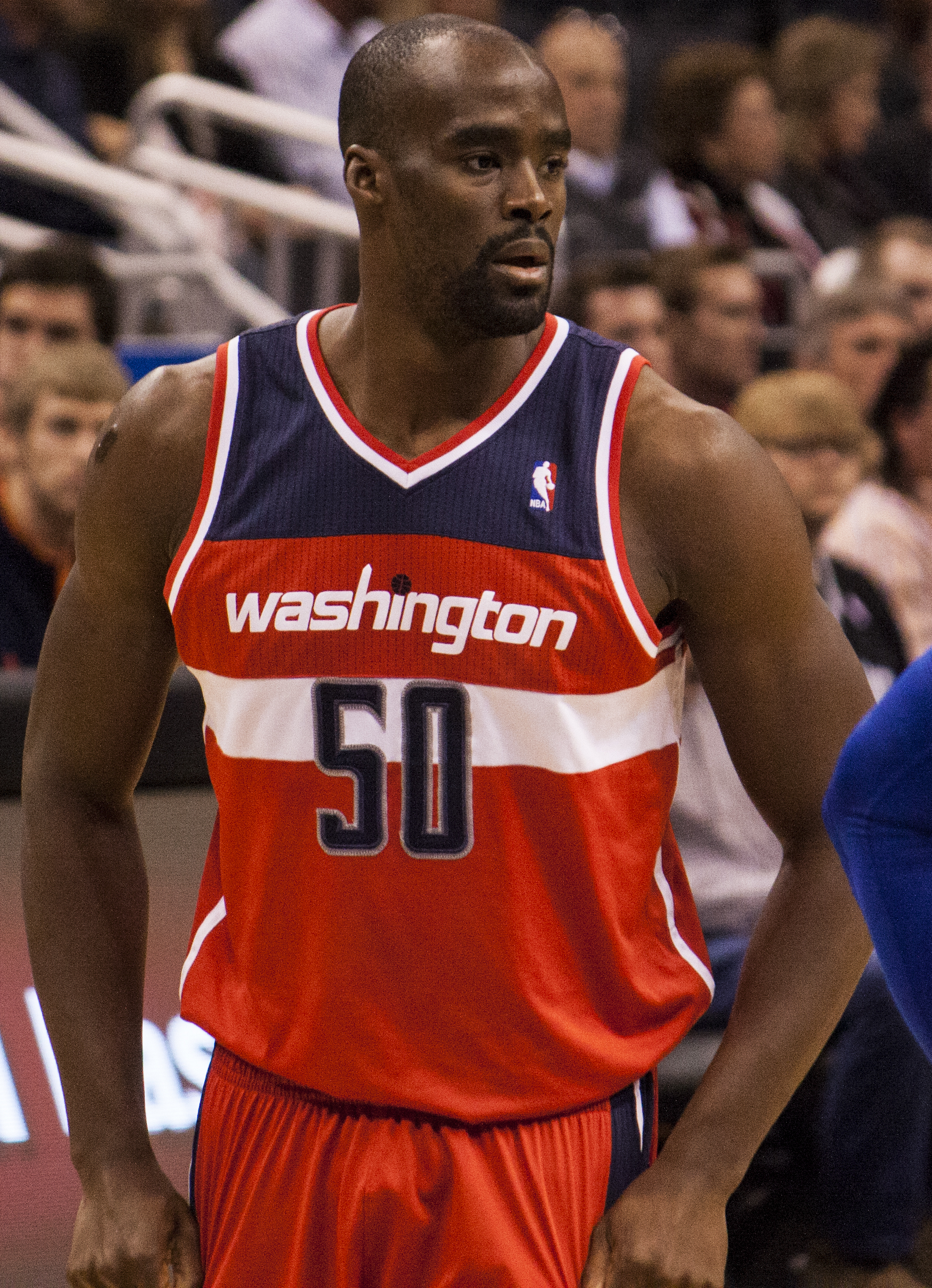
- Okafor with the Washington Wizards in 2012

Personal information
- Born: September 28, 1982 (age 44) Houston, Texas, U.S.
- Listed height: 6 ft 10 in (2.08 m)
- Listed weight: 255 lb (116 kg)

Career information
- High school: Bellaire (Bellaire, Texas)
- College: UConn (2001–2004)
- NBA draft: 2004: 1st round, 2nd overall pick
- Drafted by: Charlotte Bobcats
- Playing career: 2004–2013; 2017–2020
- Position: Center / power forward
- Number: 50

Career history
- 2004–2009: Charlotte Bobcats
- 2009–2012: New Orleans Hornets
- 2012–2013: Washington Wizards
- 2017–2018: Delaware 87ers
- 2018: New Orleans Pelicans
- 2019–2020: Ulsan Hyundai Mobis Phoebus

Career highlights
- NBA Rookie of the Year (2005); NBA All-Rookie First Team (2005); NCAA champion (2004); NCAA Final Four Most Outstanding Player (2004); NABC Co-Player of the Year (2004); Consensus first-team All-American (2004); Third-team All-American – NABC (2003); 2× NABC Defensive Player of the Year (2003, 2004); Chip Hilton Player of the Year (2004); Pete Newell Big Man Award (2004); Big East Player of the Year (2004); 2× First-team All-Big East (2003, 2004); 2× Big East Defensive Player of the Year (2003, 2004); No. 50 retired by UConn Huskies; NCAA blocks leader (2003)

Career NBA statistics
- Points: 7,370 (12.0 ppg)
- Rebounds: 5,967 (9.7 rpg)
- Blocks: 1,003 (1.6 bpg)
- Stats at NBA.com
- Stats at Basketball Reference
Medals
Men's basketball
Representing the United States
Olympic Games
Bronze medal – third place	2004 Athens	United States

Chukwuemeka Ndubuisi "Emeka" Okafor (born September 28, 1982) is an American former professional basketball player. Okafor attended Bellaire High School in Bellaire, Texas and the University of Connecticut, where in 2004 he won a national championship. In his first season in the National Basketball Association (NBA) in 2004–05, Okafor played for the Charlotte Bobcats and was named Rookie of the Year. He was traded to the New Orleans Hornets in 2009 and was then dealt to the Washington Wizards in 2012. However, a herniated disc in his neck caused Okafor to miss four consecutive seasons from 2013 to 2017 before being medically cleared to play.

== Early life ==
Okafor was born in Houston, Texas. Both of his parents are natives of Nigeria, and Emeka was the first member of his family born in the United States. His father, Pius Okafor, is a member of the Igbo ethnic group.

Okafor's family moved to Bartlesville, Oklahoma, when he was young because his father worked for Phillips Petroleum Company, headquartered in Bartlesville. While in Bartlesville, Okafor's father took his son to the Bartlesville YMCA to learn basketball.

== High school career ==
Okafor played at Bellaire High School with future Oklahoma State star John Lucas III. Okafor averaged 22 points, 16 rebounds and 7 blocks in his senior season. Bellaire was 26–5 in that season, losing 56–42 in the third round of the 2001 UIL state playoffs, to Willowridge High School and future Texas standout T. J. Ford. This game is particularly notable, however, because it featured five players who would go on to play in an NCAA Final Four (Bellaire had Lucas and Okafor, while Willowridge featured Ford, Oklahoma State's Ivan McFarlin and Duke's Daniel Ewing). All five of these players went on to play at least a season in the NBA.

Okafor flew under the recruiting radar for much of his high school career, but by the end of his senior year was receiving late interest from top programs and chose to accept a scholarship at the University of Connecticut, choosing the Huskies over Arkansas and Vanderbilt.

== College career ==
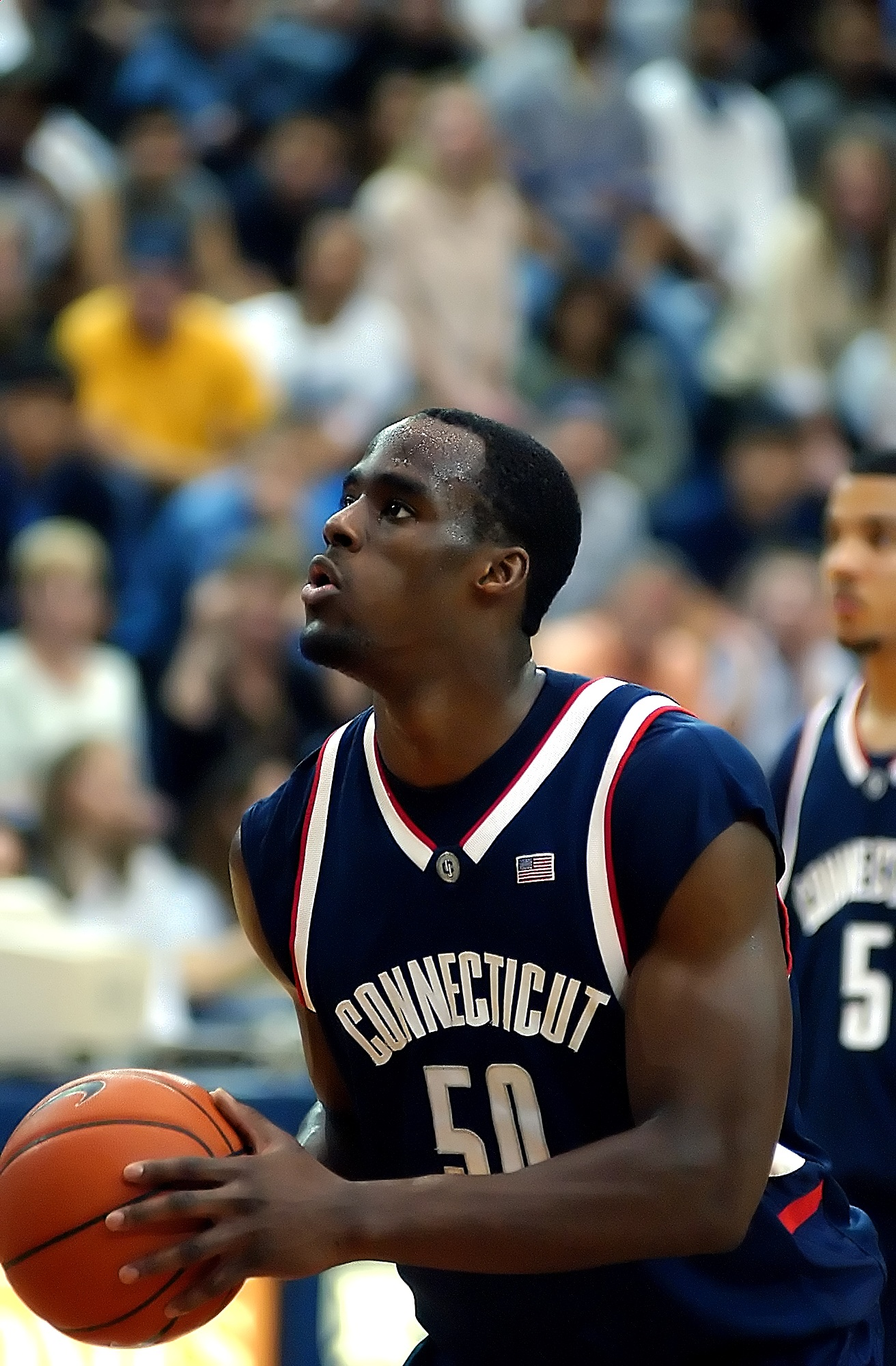
Okafor in 2004

Okafor played for Connecticut from 2001 to 2004. He was teammates with Charlie Villanueva, Marcus Williams, Ben Gordon, Hilton Armstrong and Josh Boone, who all went on to play in the NBA. He majored in finance and graduated with honors after three years in May 2004 with a 3.8 GPA. Okafor was named the Academic All-American of the Year in 2004 for his work on and off the court.

Okafor is noted for his defensive ability, especially his shot-blocking. Although plagued by back problems for most of the 2003–04 season, Okafor led UConn to the program's second national title in six seasons. He was crowned as the NCAA tournament's Most Outstanding Player. In addition, Okafor led the nation in blocks that season and was also named National Defensive Player of the Year by the National Association of Basketball Coaches. He also received the Big East Player of the Year award. Okafor graduated as Connecticut's leader in blocked shots with 441. For his collegiate achievements, Okafor was made a member of the 2004 U.S. National Men's Basketball Team that represented the U.S. at the Olympics in Athens.

On February 5, 2007, he was inducted to the Husky Ring Of Honor at Gampel Pavilion on the UConn campus in Storrs during halftime of the men's basketball game against the Syracuse Orange as part of a ceremony that recognized the accomplishments of 13 former players and 3 coaches.

On February 18th, 2026, Okafor's number that he wore with the Huskies, #50, was retired during halftime of the UConn vs Creighton game at Gampel Pavilion in Storrs. Okafor's number was the third men's player in UConn men's basketball history to have his number retired.

== Professional career ==
=== Charlotte Bobcats (2004–2009) ===
==== 2004–05 season: Rookie of the Year ====
On April 16, 2004, Okafor declared his eligibility for the 2004 NBA draft, giving up his one remaining year of college athletic eligibility. He did, however, receive his undergraduate degree in Accounting/Finance in three academic years at the University of Connecticut. On June 24, Okafor was selected second overall in the draft, becoming the first ever draft pick by the expansion Charlotte Bobcats. The following day, he accepted an invitation to join the United States team for the 2004 Summer Olympics, which finished with the bronze medal in Athens.

The 2004–05 season was a successful campaign as Okafor coped well with the pressures of being the star rookie on an expansion franchise. Highlights of the season included recording 19 straight double-doubles from November 21 through January 1, and finishing seventh among Eastern Conference forwards in NBA All-Star Game fan balloting with 408,082 votes, by far the highest number garnered by any rookie in 2005. At the end of the season, Okafor beat out his friend and former college teammate and roommate, Chicago Bulls guard Ben Gordon, to win the NBA Rookie of the Year Award.

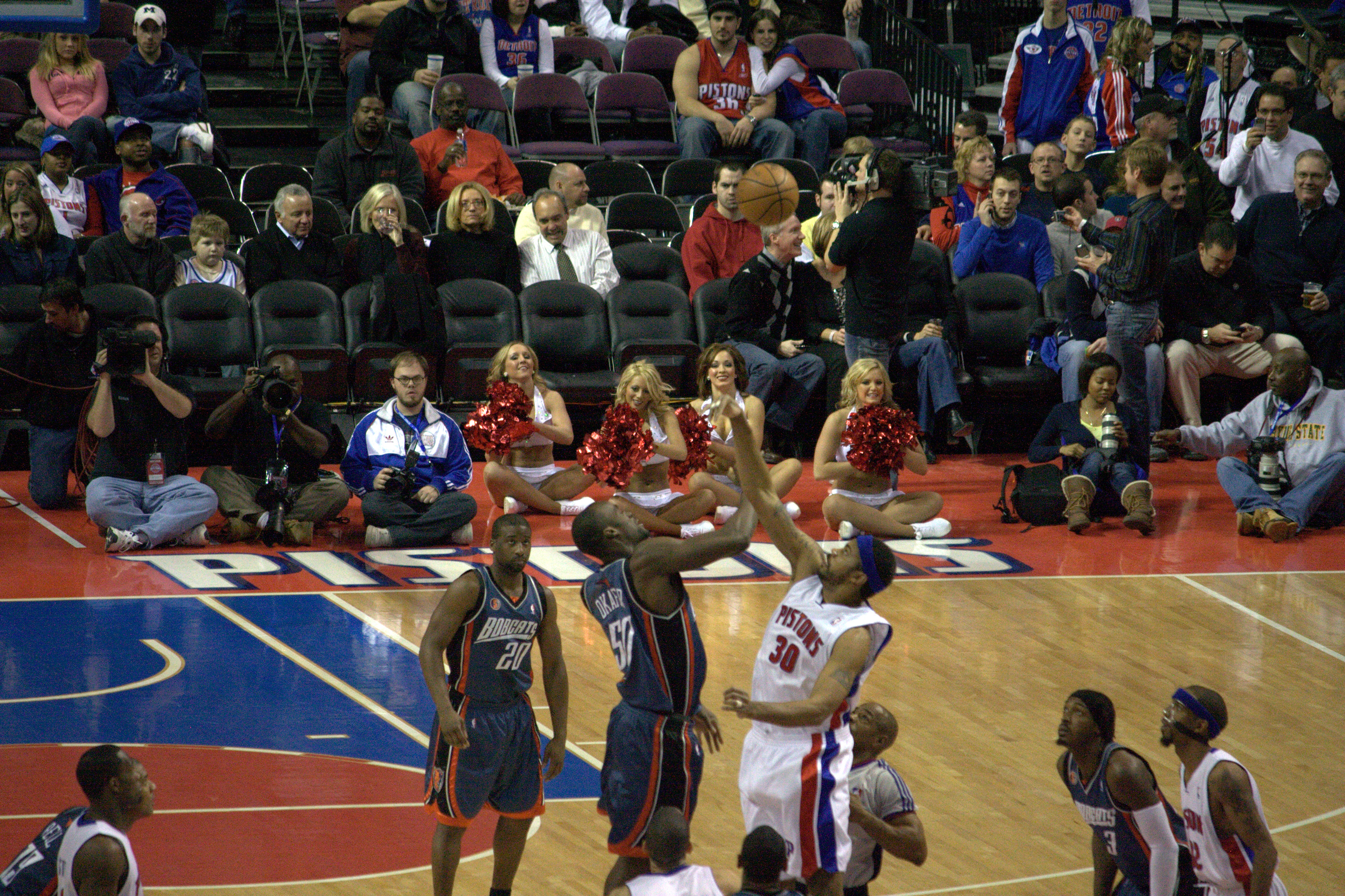
Okafor tipping-off against Rasheed Wallace

On June 24, 2005, the Bobcats picked up the option for the fourth year on Okafor's contract, as he quickly established himself as the face of the franchise, and a solid player for years to come. Okafor finished his rookie season with 44.7% field goal percentage and per-game averages of 15.1 points, 10.9 rebounds (ranked 4th in the league), and 1.7 blocks.

==== 2005–06 season ====
In the 2005 offseason, Okafor's weight increased from 260 to 280 lbs. It was this weight gain which he felt caused him to have trouble rehabbing his early season ankle injury and forced him to sit out most of the 2005–06 season with injuries to his ankle. Nonetheless, in the few games he played he was effective as he averaged a double-double for the second consecutive season. On November 4, 2005, Okafor scored a season high 24 points, alongside grabbing 11 rebounds, in a 110–93 victory over the Philadelphia 76ers. For the season he finished with averages of 13.2 points on 41.5% shooting, 10.0 rebounds and 1.9 blocks per game.

==== 2006–07 season ====
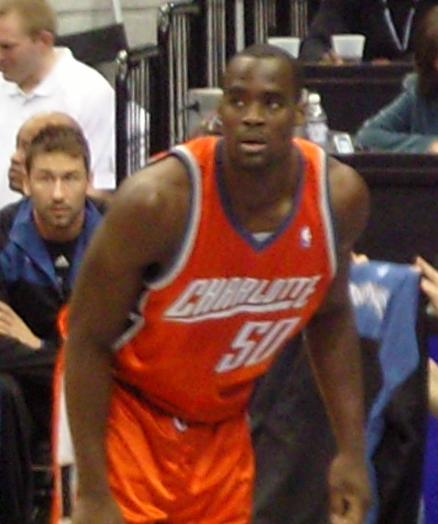
Okafor playing for Charlotte in 2007

During the offseason he continued his tutorials with Hakeem Olajuwon, which he took up after his rookie season, and lost the 20 pounds which he had gained for his second season. Okafor felt this weight loss gave him more energy and mobility. He led the Bobcats in rebounds per game, blocks per game, and field goal percentage. On December 29, 2006, in a home game against the Los Angeles Lakers, Emeka would record 22 points, 25 rebounds, and 4 blocks in over 51 minutes of play, in an epic 133–124 triple overtime victory. He also had eight blocks in games against the Dallas Mavericks and Boston Celtics. On January 12, 2007, he would record an NBA season high ten blocks in a game against the New York Knicks. His ten blocks were the most ever recorded in a single game at Madison Square Garden. In that game, he was one rebound away from recording the first ever triple-double in franchise history, finishing with 20 pts, 10 blocks, 9 rebounds, and 3 steals. Later in the season, he suffered an ankle injury which caused him to miss fifteen games. He finished the season averaging 14.4 points, 11.3 rebounds and 2.6 blocks in 67 games.

==== 2007–08 season ====
Prior to the start of the 2007–08 season, Okafor turned down a contract extension with the Charlotte Bobcats worth an estimated US$60 million over five years. Despite turning down the contract, Okafor maintained that he indeed wanted to remain with the Bobcats. Despite feuding with head coach Sam Vincent throughout the season, Okafor still managed to average a double-double for the fourth consecutive season of his career. He also played in all 82 games of the regular season for the first time in his career. At the end of the season head coach Sam Vincent was fired by part-owner Michael Jordan saying in a statement: "The decision to remove Sam as head coach after just one season was difficult, but it was a decision that had to be made because my first obligation is to do what is in the best interest of our team."

==== 2008–09 season ====
During the off-season, the Bobcats' top priority was to re-sign their face of the franchise. Through tough negotiations the Bobcats and Okafor eventually reached an agreement on a six-year, $72 million deal, the largest in franchise history. In a statement, Okafor voiced his pleasure with remaining in the organization now coached by the legendary Larry Brown: "The Bobcats and the entire Charlotte community embraced me from day one, and it's exciting to enter this season with a Hall of Fame coach and teammates who are committed to winning."

Okafor entered the 2008–09 season with active franchise-record streaks of 93 consecutive games played and 92 consecutive games started. That year Okafor played in all 82 regular season games for the second straight season (starting in all but one game) and averaged a double-double for a fifth straight season.

In his final season for the Bobcats, Okafor averaged 13.2 points, 10.1 rebounds, and 1.7 steals per game. But at the end of that 2008–2009 season, Bobcats head coach Larry Brown publicly questioned Okafor's passion. “I tease him that he’s got an A in stretching and pilates and yoga. I want him to have an A in basketball,” Brown said to reporters two days after Charlotte finished the season with a 35–47 record. “It makes older people feel great, but he’s got to work on his game.... There’s no better guy than him, I just want him to have a passion to play the sport because it ends so quickly.”

=== New Orleans Hornets (2009–2012) ===
On July 28, 2009, Okafor was traded to the New Orleans Hornets in exchange for Tyson Chandler. Charlotte head coach Larry Brown was reportedly willing jettison the franchise's first ever draft pick for another 26-year-old center who is three inches taller because it brought financial relief and because, at 6-foot-10, he felt Okafor had trouble guarding the NBA's top big men.

During the 2009–10 season, Okafor played in all 82 games for the third season in a row but just missed extending his streak of five seasons averaging a double-double with 10.4 points and 9.0 rebounds per game. Head coach Byron Scott was fired after a disappointing 3–6 start and replaced by GM Jeff Bower. The team finished last in the Southwest Division with a 37–45 record. At the end of the season, Bower stepped down from his coaching duties and returned to his position as a general manager. He was replaced by Monty Williams.

During the 2010–11 season, Okafor helped New Orleans make the playoffs and appeared in his first-ever NBA playoff series. The Hornets finished the regular season 46-36 good for third place in the Southwest Division. Facing the Los Angeles Lakers in the first round of the postseason, Okafor scored 15 points and grabbed 8 rebounds in a 100-86 Game 3 loss, both of which would end up being postseason career highs. The Hornets lost the series 4–2.

The following 2011–12 season, Okafor averaged 9.9 points and 7.9 rebounds per game. But the Hornets struggled and traded away their star point guard Chris Paul plus two second-round draft picks mid-season to the Los Angeles Clippers for Eric Gordon, Al-Farouq Aminu, Chris Kaman, and an unprotected first-round draft pick. On December 28, 2011, Okafor scored 13 points to go with a season-high 6 blocks in a 97–78 win over the Boston Celtics.

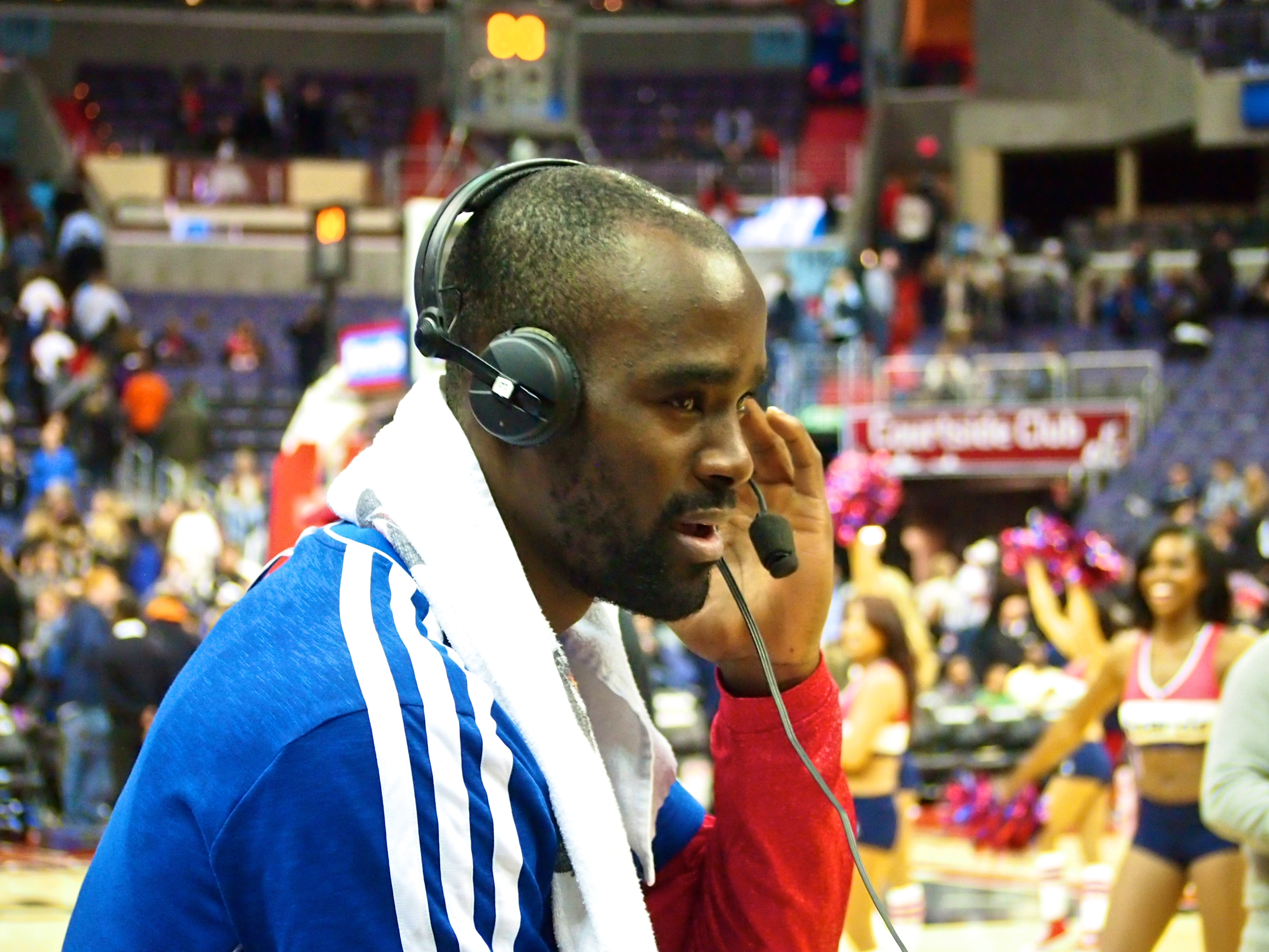
Okafor with a headset while playing with the Wizards in 2013

=== Washington Wizards (2012–2013) ===
On June 20, 2012, Okafor was traded, along with Trevor Ariza, to the Washington Wizards in exchange for Rashard Lewis and the 46th pick of the 2012 NBA draft. Okafor went on to be named a finalist for the inaugural Twyman–Stokes Teammate of the Year Award for his contributions with the team on and off the court.

On October 25, 2013, days before the start of the 2013–14 season, Okafor was traded, along with a 2014 protected first-round draft pick, to the Phoenix Suns in exchange for Marcin Gortat, Shannon Brown, Kendall Marshall and Malcolm Lee. However, he missed the entire season due to a herniated disc in his neck that was discovered in September 2013, and remained unsigned throughout the 2014–15 season, the 2015–16 season, and the 2016–17 season. On May 30, 2017, Okafor was medically cleared to play.

=== Delaware 87ers (2017–2018) ===
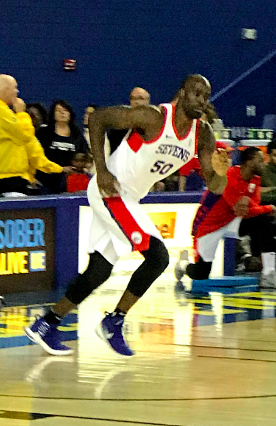
Okafor during his tenure with the Delaware 87ers

On September 25, 2017, Okafor signed with the Philadelphia 76ers. However, he was waived on October 14 after appearing in five preseason games. Later that month, he joined the Delaware 87ers of the NBA G League.

=== Return to New Orleans (2018) ===
On February 3, 2018, Okafor signed a 10-day contract with the New Orleans Pelicans. He made his Pelicans debut two days later, playing in the NBA for the first time since 2013. He played nine minutes and had three points and two rebounds in a 133–109 loss to the Utah Jazz. He signed a second 10-day contract on February 14, and a rest-of-season contract on February 26. Filling in for the injured DeMarcus Cousins, Okafor averaged 4.4 points, 4.6 rebounds and 1 block in 26 regular-season games, including 19 starts. He was waived by the Pelicans on September 19, 2018, just before the start of training camp.

Okafor signed with the Philadelphia 76ers on September 21, 2018, before being waived on October 13.

Because Okafor was waived by Philadelphia before the season started, the end of the 2017–18 season with the Pelicans ended up being his final playing time in the NBA. His final game was Game 3 of the 2018 Western Conference First Round against the Portland Trail Blazers on April 19, 2018. The Pelicans won the game 119–102 with Okafor playing 3 1/2 minutes and only recording 1 foul as a stat.

=== Ulsan Hyundai Mobis Phoebus (2019–2020) ===
On November 22, 2019, Ulsan Hyundai Mobis Phoebus reported that they had added Okafor to their roster. Okafor made his debut for them on December 4, 2019, coming off from bench with a double-double of 11 points, 12 rebounds, two assists and two blocks in a 60–65 loss to the Anyang KGC.

== NBA career statistics ==
Legend
GP	Games played	GS	Games started	MPG	Minutes per game
FG%	Field goal percentage	3P%	3-point field goal percentage	FT%	Free throw percentage
RPG	Rebounds per game	APG	Assists per game	SPG	Steals per game
BPG	Blocks per game	PPG	Points per game	**Bold**	Career high
*	Led the league

=== Regular season ===
Year	Team	GP	GS	MPG	FG%	3P%	FT%	RPG	APG	SPG	BPG	PPG
2004–05	Charlotte	73	73	**35.6**	.447	.000	.609	10.9	.9	.8	1.7	**15.1**
2005–06	Charlotte	26	25	33.6	.415	—	.656	10.0	**1.2**	.8	1.9	13.2
2006–07	Charlotte	67	65	34.8	.532	—	.593	**11.3**	**1.2**	**.9**	**2.6**	14.4
2007–08	Charlotte	**82***	**82***	33.1	.535	—	.570	10.7	.9	.8	1.7	13.8
2008–09	Charlotte	**82***	81	32.8	.561	—	.593	10.1	.6	.6	1.7	13.2
2009–10	New Orleans	**82***	**82***	28.9	.530	—	.562	9.0	.7	.7	1.5	10.4
2010–11	New Orleans	72	72	31.8	**.573**	.000	.562	9.5	.6	.6	1.8	10.3
2011–12	New Orleans	27	27	28.9	.533	—	.514	7.9	.9	.6	1.0	9.9
2012–13	Washington	79	77	26.0	.477	—	.571	8.8	**1.2**	.6	1.0	9.7
2017–18	New Orleans	26	19	13.6	.505	—	**.818**	4.6	.3	.3	1.0	4.4
Career		616	603	30.9	.512	.000	.586	9.7	.8	.7	1.6	12.0

=== Playoffs ===
Year	Team	GP	GS	MPG	FG%	3P%	FT%	RPG	APG	SPG	BPG	PPG
2011	New Orleans	**6**	**6**	**31.3**	**.645**	—	**.364**	**5.5**	.0	**1.0**	**1.0**	**7.3**
2018	New Orleans	1	0	4.0	.000	—	—	.0	.0	.0	.0	.0
Career		7	6	27.4	.625	—	.364	4.7	.0	.9	.9	6.3

== Personal life ==
Okafor's first name, Chukwuemeka, means "God has done well" in the Igbo language. He appeared on the cover of NCAA March Madness 2005 video game. Okafor appeared as himself in the second season of the TV show One Tree Hill. Okafor also appeared as himself in the second season of the TV show Power Book II: Ghost.

Okafor is a distant cousin of fellow NBA player Jahlil Okafor. He has two children with his wife Ilana Nunn, the daughter of former NBA referee and director of officiating - hall of famer Ronnie Nunn.

== See also ==
- List of NCAA Division I men's basketball career blocks leaders
- List of NCAA Division I men's basketball season blocks leaders
- List of NBA single-game blocks leaders
- U.S. men's basketball team at the 2004 Olympics
