= Coach K College Basketball =

1995 video game

- Developer: EA Canada (credited as Hitmen Productions)
- Publisher: EA Sports
- Composer: Jeff van Dyck
- Platform: Genesis
- Release: NA: February 1995
- Genre: Sports
- Modes: Single-player, multiplayer

Coach K College Basketball is the first college basketball video game published by EA Sports spun off from their NBA Live engine. Coach K College Basketball was released in 1995 for Sega Genesis.

== Gameplay ==
Coach K College Basketball is the only EA college basketball game to be produced for the Genesis. Endorsed by Duke head basketball coach Mike Krzyzewski, the game features 32 officially licensed teams in addition to eight classic teams. Among the 32 teams were Arizona, UCLA, Arkansas, UMass, Temple, Kentucky, Syracuse, and Kansas.

== Reception ==
GamePro commented in their review that "With seven trips to the tournament semifinals under his belt, Krzyzweski knows his stuff, and so does EA Sports - this game takes Dick Vitale's College Hoops to the hole", citing the numerous options, customizable rules, realistic-styled sprites, and strong voice effects. The two sports reviewers of Electronic Gaming Monthly gave it scores of 8 out of 10 and 7 out of 10, praising the wide selection of teams, the multiplayer mode, and the use of plays and animations from the NBA Live engine.

Next Generation reviewed the Genesis version of the game, rating it four stars out of five, and stated that "this game is easily the best attempt yet at capturing this excitement of March Madness."
