= Run and Gun II =

1996 video game

- Arcade cabinet
- Developer(s): Konami
- Publisher(s): Konami
- Platform(s): Arcade
- Release: March 1996
- Genre(s): Sports (basketball)

Run and Gun II is a basketball video game developed and published by Konami as an arcade video game in 1996.

== Background ==
The game is the sequel to Konami's 1993 arcade video game Run and Gun. The original game had earned $1,500,000 (equivalent to $3,300,000 in 2024) from European advance orders prior to release (mostly from Spain and Italy), and was America's top-grossing upright arcade cabinet in December 1993.

== Gameplay ==
Run and Gun II is a sequel that adds maneuvers like alley oops, spins, and defensive moves such as block outs.

== Reception ==
In Japan, Game Machine listed Run and Gun II on their May 1, 1996 issue as being the seventh most-successful arcade game of the month.

Hyper reviewed the arcade game, rating it 4½ out of 5 stars and calling it "an excellent game" that is "far superior" to its predecessor. Next Generation rated it three stars out of five, giving the praise to its multiplayer.
