= NBA Live 2004 =

2003 video game

- Cover art with Vince Carter
- Developer: EA Canada
- Publisher: Electronic Arts
- Series: NBA Live
- Platforms: PlayStation 2, Xbox, GameCube, Windows
- Release: GameCube, PS2, Xbox: NA: October 14, 2003; EU: November 7, 2003; Windows: NA: November 11, 2003; EU: November 28, 2003
- Genre: Sports (basketball)
- Modes: Single-player, multiplayer

NBA Live 2004 is the 2004 installment of the NBA Live sports video game series. The game was developed by EA Canada and released in 2003. The cover shows Vince Carter as a member of the Toronto Raptors; in Spain it is Raul Lopez instead. This was also the first game to feature the Charlotte Bobcats, who would play their first season of basketball in the fall of 2004. Since the game's rosters were finalized before the Bobcats would host their expansion draft, the Bobcats' lineup consisted of players named after their specific positions; for example, the point guard was named "Point Guard".

== Gameplay ==
=== Modes ===
Beyond the Play Now mode, the game features the following modes:

Season play allows the player to choose an NBA team to compete for the season trophy. Players can also choose how many games there are during the season. A custom player option also allows game players to create their own team of NBA players. Roster management allows players to sign and trade players from various teams.

Dynasty is a gameplay mode that shares similarities with the traditional season mode but introduces unique features and objectives. In Dynasty Mode, teams compete for the Dynasty Trophy. Players earn points through gameplay, which can then be utilized for improvements like player skill levels. These points can be allocated to conduct individual or team training sessions, aiming to enhance the skill levels of the player's team. A key aspect of Dynasty Mode involves the drafting and development of new players, emphasizing long-term team building, and management strategies.

Playoffs allows players to customize and play in the postseason.

One on one allows two players to compete on either a gym or street court.

Individual Practice allows for practicing and improving court skills.

The game also allows players to purchase items from the NBA Store to use in the game based on points they have earned during gameplay. Purchasable items are split in four categories: Hardwood Classics (Jerseys), Shoes, Team Gear and NBA Gear.

== Reception ==
Reception

Aggregate score
Aggregator	Score			
Aggregator	GameCube	PC	PS2	Xbox
Metacritic	84/100	80/100	86/100	85/100

Review scores
Publication	Score			
Publication	GameCube	PC	PS2	Xbox
Electronic Gaming Monthly	8.5/10	N/A	8.5/10	8.5/10
Famitsu	N/A	N/A	31/40	N/A
Game Informer	8.25/10	N/A	8.5/10	8.25/10
GamePro	4.5/5	N/A	4.5/5	4/5
GameRevolution	B+	N/A	B+	B+
GameSpot	8/10	7.8/10	8.3/10	8.3/10
GameSpy	4/5	3/5	4/5	4/5
GameZone	8.4/10	8.6/10	9.3/10	8.6/10
IGN	8.7/10	8.5/10	8.8/10	8.7/10
Nintendo Power	3.4/5	N/A	N/A	N/A
Official U.S. PlayStation Magazine	N/A	N/A	4.5/5	N/A
Official Xbox Magazine (US)	N/A	N/A	N/A	9.1/10
PC Gamer (US)	N/A	84%	N/A	N/A
Entertainment Weekly	A−	N/A	A−	A−

The game received "favorable" reviews on all platforms according to video game review aggregator Metacritic. In Japan, Famitsu gave the PlayStation 2 version a score of three, eights and one, seven for a total of 31 out of 40.

During the AIAS' 7th Annual Interactive Achievement Awards, NBA Live 2004 received a nomination for "Outstanding Achievement in Licensed Soundtrack", which was ultimately awarded to SSX 3.
