= List of PC games (N) =

The following page is an alphabetical section from the list of PC games.

== N ==
Name	Developer	Publisher	Genre(s)	Operating system(s)	Date released
Napoleon: Total War	The Creative Assembly, Feral Interactive	Sega, Typhoon Games, Feral Interactive	Turn-based strategy	Microsoft Windows	February 23, 2010
Natural Selection 2	Unknown Worlds Entertainment	Unknown Worlds Entertainment	First-person shooter, RTS	Microsoft Windows, Linux	October 30, 2012
NBA 2K9	Visual Concepts	2K Sports	Sports	Microsoft Windows	October 7, 2008
NBA 2K10	Visual Concepts	2K Sports	Sports	Microsoft Windows	October 12, 2009
NBA 2K11	Visual Concepts	2K Sports	Sports	Microsoft Windows	October 5, 2010
NBA 2K12	Visual Concepts	2K Sports	Sports	Microsoft Windows	October 4, 2011
NBA 2K13	Visual Concepts	2K Sports	Sports	Microsoft Windows	October 2, 2012
NBA 2K14	Visual Concepts	2K Sports	Sports	Microsoft Windows	November 15, 2013
NBA 2K15	Visual Concepts	2K Sports	Sports	Microsoft Windows	October 7, 2014
NBA 2K16	Visual Concepts	2K Sports	Sports	Microsoft Windows	September 29, 2016
NBA 2K17	Visual Concepts	2K Sports	Sports	Microsoft Windows	September 20, 2016
NBA 2K18	Visual Concepts	2K Sports	Sports	Microsoft Windows	September 19, 2017
NBA 2K19	Visual Concepts	2K Sports	Sports	Microsoft Windows	September 11, 2018
NBA 2K20	Visual Concepts	2K Sports	Sports	Microsoft Windows	September 6, 2019
NBA 2K21	Visual Concepts	2K Sports	Sports	Microsoft Windows, macOS	September 4, 2020
NBA 2K22	Visual Concepts	2K Sports	Sports	Microsoft Windows, macOS	September 10, 2021
NBA 2K23	Visual Concepts	2K Sports	Sports	Microsoft Windows	September 9, 2022
NBA 2K24	Visual Concepts	2K Sports	Sports	Microsoft Windows	September 8, 2023
NBA 2K25	Visual Concepts	2K Sports	Sports	Microsoft Windows	September 6, 2024
NBA 2K26	Visual Concepts	2K Sports	Sports	Microsoft Windows	September 5, 2025
NBA 2K Playgrounds 2	Saber Interactive	2K Sports	Sports	Microsoft Windows	October 16, 2018
NBA Hangtime	Midway, Funcom	Midway	Sports	Microsoft Windows	December 31, 1996
NBA Inside Drive	Microsoft Studios	Microsoft Studios	Sports	Microsoft Windows	August 17, 2000
NBA Jam Extreme	Sculptured Software	Acclaim	Sports	Microsoft Windows	January 31, 1997
NBA Live 95	EA Canada	EA Sports	Sports	MS-DOS	1995
NBA Live 96	EA Canada	EA Sports, THQ	Sports	MS-DOS	December 31, 1995
NBA Live 97	EA Sports	EA Sports	Sports	MS-DOS	December 1996
NBA Live 98	EA Canada	EA Sports	Sports	Microsoft Windows	October 28, 1997
NBA Live 99	EA Canada	EA Sports	Sports	Microsoft Windows	October 31, 1998
NBA Live 2000	EA Canada	Electronic Arts	Sports	Microsoft Windows	October 31, 1999
NBA Live 2001	Electronic Arts	Electronic Arts	Sports	Microsoft Windows	February 7, 2001
NBA Live 2003	EA Canada	EA Sports	Sports	Microsoft Windows	October 8, 2002
NBA Live 2004	EA Canada	Electronic Arts	Sports	Microsoft Windows	October 15, 2003
NBA Live 2005	EA Canada	Electronic Arts	Sports	Microsoft Windows	September 28, 2004
NBA Live 06	EA Canada	EA Sports	Sports	Microsoft Windows	October 4, 2005
NBA Live 07	EA Canada	EA Sports	Sports	Microsoft Windows	November 15, 2006
NBA Live 08	HB Studios	EA Sports	Sports	Microsoft Windows	October 2, 2007
NBA Playgrounds	Saber Interactive	Mad Dog Games	Sports	Microsoft Windows	May 9, 2017
Need for Speed	Pioneer Productions	Electronic Arts	Racing	MS-DOS	August 31, 1994
Need for Speed II	Electronic Arts	Electronic Arts	Racing	Microsoft Windows	March 31, 1997
Need for Speed III: Hot Pursuit	Electronic Arts	Electronic Arts	Racing	Microsoft Windows	March 25, 1998
Need for Speed: High Stakes	Electronic Arts	Electronic Arts	Racing	Microsoft Windows	March 8, 1999
Need for Speed: Porsche Unleashed	Electronic Arts	Electronic Arts	Racing	Microsoft Windows	February 29, 2000
Need for Speed: Hot Pursuit 2	Electronic Arts	Electronic Arts	Racing	Microsoft Windows	October 2, 2002
Need for Speed: Underground	EA Black Box	Electronic Arts	Racing	Microsoft Windows	October 2, 2002
Need for Speed Heat	Ghost Games	Electronic Arts	Racing	Microsoft Windows	November 8, 2019
Need for Speed Unbound	Criterion Games	Electronic Arts	Racing, open world	Microsoft Windows	December 2, 2022
Neighbours from Hell	JoWooD Vienna	JoWooD Productions	Puzzle	Microsoft Windows	June 20, 2003
Neighbours from Hell 2: On Vacation	JoWooD Vienna	JoWooD Productions	Puzzle	Microsoft Windows	May 5, 2004
Nether: Resurrected	Phosphor Games Studio	Nether Productions, LLC	Survival Horror, Open World, Action	Microsoft Windows	October 28, 2013
The Neverhood	The Neverhood, Inc.	DreamWorks Interactive	Point-and-click adventure game	Microsoft Windows	October 31, 1996
Neverwinter Nights	BioWare	Infogrames, MacSoft	Role-playing	Microsoft Windows, Linux, macOS	June 18, 2002
Neverwinter Nights: Shadows of Undrentide	BioWare, Floodgate Entertainment	Atari, MacSoft	Role-playing	Microsoft Windows, Linux, macOS	June 21, 2003
Neverwinter Nights: Hordes of the Underdark	BioWare	Atari, MacSoft	Role-playing	Microsoft Windows, Linux, macOS	December 2, 2003
Neverwinter Nights 2	Obsidian Entertainment	Atari	RPG	Microsoft Windows, macOS	October 31, 2006
Neverwinter Nights 2: Mask of the Betrayer	Obsidian Entertainment	Atari	RPG	Microsoft Windows, macOS	October 9, 2007
Neverwinter Nights 2: Storm of Zehir	Obsidian Entertainment	Atari	RPG	Microsoft Windows, macOS	November 18, 2008
Neverwinter Nights 2: Mysteries of Westgate	Obsidian Entertainment	Atari	RPG	Microsoft Windows, macOS	April 29, 2009
Next Car Game: Wreckfest	Bugbear Entertainment	Bugbear Entertainment	Racing, destruction	Microsoft Windows	June 14, 2018
Nickelodeon Party Blast	Data Design Interactive	Infogrames	Party	Microsoft Windows	October 30, 2002
Nier: Automata	PlatinumGames	Square Enix	Action role-playing	Microsoft Windows	March 17, 2017
Night in the Woods	Infinite Fall	Finji	Adventure	Microsoft Windows, Linux, macOS	February 21, 2017
Nikoderiko: The Magical World	Vea Games	Knights Peak	Platformer, action-adventure	Microsoft Windows	October 2024
Ninjabread Man	Data Design Interactive	Metro3D Europe	Platformer	Microsoft Windows	July 23, 2005
Nioh	Team Ninja	Koei Tecmo, Sony Interactive Entertainment	Action role-playing	Microsoft Windows	November 7, 2017
No Case Should Remain Unsolved	Somi	Somi	Adventure, puzzle	Microsoft Windows	January 18, 2024
No Man's Sky	Hello Games	Hello Games	Action-adventure	Microsoft Windows	August 9, 2016
No More Room in Hell	Matt Kazan	Steam	Survival horror	Microsoft Windows, Linux, macOS	October 31, 2013
Not for Broadcast	NotGames	tinyBuild	Simulation, adventure	Microsoft Windows	January 25, 2022
Nour: Play with Your Food	Terrifying Jellyfish	Panic	Casual, simulation, indie	Microsoft Windows, macOS	September 12, 2023
