= Ignite (game engine) =

Game engine by Electronic Arts

EA Sports Ignite
- Developer: EA Sports
- Platform: Microsoft Windows; PlayStation 4 Xbox One
- Type: Game engine
- License: Proprietary
- Website: www.ea.com/games/fifa/fifa-19/news/fifa-ea-sports-ignite

The EA Sports Ignite game engine (styled as EA SPORTS IGNITE) is a collection of video game technologies built by Electronic Arts and designed to make video game sports "alive". The technology was announced at Microsoft's Xbox One reveal event in May 2013 for three EA Sports franchise games for Xbox One and PlayStation 4: FIFA 14, Madden NFL 25 and NBA Live 14, all released in Fall 2013.

== Capabilities ==
Electronic Arts announced several features within the engine. Its Human Intelligence framework lets in-game players "think like real athletes", with the ability to make snap judgments, prepare for impact, and perform as a team player. For example, the new artificial intelligence creates a sense of urgency for computer players towards the end of an association football match to rush for more shots on goal. The True Player Motion framework makes players' bodies, limbs, and clothing each move according to physics. The Living Worlds framework models the stadium audience members and their behaviors individually. The audience will have expectations about the in-game sports matches, and will react accordingly to the match's progress. The Ignite artificial intelligence is able to use the next-gen hardware to handle four times as many calculations per second than older EA Sports titles. Animation detail is expected to improve "ten-fold".

Electronic Arts plans to use Ignite for future sports games and Frostbite for future action games (with the exception of Rory McIlroy PGA Tour, which also uses Frostbite, and current iterations of the Madden NFL, FIFA, UFC and NHL series, which use Frostbite instead of Ignite). The company had previously shared technology internally before moving to develop all future sports games on the same engine.

== History ==
Ignite was publicly announced at Microsoft's May 2013 Xbox One reveal event. Four upcoming EA Sports franchise games for Xbox One and PlayStation 4 were announced to be using the technology: FIFA 14, EA Sports UFC, Madden NFL 25, and NBA Live 14. Electronic Arts showed pre-rendered sequences of the games at the reveal event instead of real-time gameplay.

The engine was used for a number of EA Sports titles in the mid to late 2010s with two games using the engine in 2020. Use of the Ignite engine was later phased out of EA Sports titles in favor of Frostbite.

== Games using the Ignite engine ==
Title	Platform(s)	Release date	Genre(s)
FIFA 14	PlayStation 4, Xbox One	November 2013	Sports
Madden NFL 25	PlayStation 4, Xbox One	November 2013	Sports
NBA Live 14	PlayStation 4, Xbox One	November 2013	Sports
EA Sports UFC	PlayStation 4, Xbox One	June 2014	Sports
Madden NFL 15	PlayStation 4, Xbox One	August 2014	Sports
NHL 15	PlayStation 4, Xbox One	September 2014	Sports
FIFA 15	Microsoft Windows, PlayStation 4, Xbox One	September 2014	Sports
NBA Live 15	PlayStation 4, Xbox One	October 2014	Sports
Madden NFL 16	PlayStation 4, Xbox One	August 2015	Sports
NHL 16	PlayStation 4, Xbox One	September 2015	Sports
FIFA 16	Microsoft Windows, PlayStation 4, Xbox One	September 2015	Sports
NBA Live 16	PlayStation 4, Xbox One	September 2015	Sports
EA Sports UFC 2	PlayStation 4, Xbox One	March 2016	Sports
Madden NFL 17	PlayStation 4, Xbox One	August 2016	Sports
NHL 17	PlayStation 4, Xbox One	September 2016	Sports
NHL 18	PlayStation 4, Xbox One	September 2017	Sports
NBA Live 18	PlayStation 4, Xbox One	September 2017	Sports
EA Sports UFC 3	PlayStation 4, Xbox One	February 2018	Sports
EA Sports FC Online	Microsoft Windows	May 2018	Sports
NHL 19	PlayStation 4, Xbox One	September 2018	Sports
NBA Live 19	PlayStation 4, Xbox One	September 2018	Sports
NHL 20	PlayStation 4, Xbox One	September 2019	Sports
EA Sports UFC 4	PlayStation 4, Xbox One	August 2020	Sports
NHL 21	PlayStation 4, Xbox One	October 2020	Sports
