= NBA Live 14 =

2013 basketball video game

- Cover art featuring Kyrie Irving
- Developer: EA Tiburon
- Publisher: Electronic Arts
- Series: NBA Live
- Engine: Ignite
- Platforms: PlayStation 4 Xbox One
- Release: Xbox One: NA: November 19, 2013; EU: November 22, 2013; PlayStation 4: NA: November 19, 2013; EU: November 29, 2013
- Genre: Sports
- Modes: Single-player, multiplayer

NBA Live 14 is a basketball video game released on the PlayStation 4 and Xbox One in 2013. It is the first NBA Live game on the PlayStation 4 and the Xbox One. NBA Live 14 features Kyrie Irving of the Cleveland Cavaliers as its cover athlete. It is one of the most negatively received games in its franchise. NBA Live 14 was followed by NBA Live 15 which was released in October 2014. The game marks the first installment in the series since NBA Live 10 in 2009.

== Gameplay ==
The first gameplay for the game was shown at the Xbox One reveal event in a trailer by EA Sports, showing off the new IGNITE game engine. The game was released in November 2013.

== Reception ==
Reception

Aggregate score
Aggregator	Score
Metacritic	(XONE) 36/100 (PS4) 43/100

Review scores
Publication	Score
Game Informer	4/10
GameRevolution	3/5
GameSpot	4/10
GamesRadar+	2.5/5
IGN	4.3/10

NBA Live 14 received generally unfavorable reviews, according to review aggregator Metacritic. IGN gave the game a 4.3/10 with reviewer Jec Julio saying that "NBA Live's flaccid return is made all the more disappointing because we waited three years for it. After all that time, NBA Live 14 in no way advances the basketball sim genre and, worse, leaves little to be optimistic about for next year." However, he did say that the Big Moments and the Ultimate Team modes were a positive. GamesRadar gave it a 2.5/5, comparing it to NBA 2K14 with reviewer Richard Grisham saying "The on-court gameplay doesn't look very next-gen-like, especially when compared to its NBA 2K14 counterpart." While he praised the controls in 5-On-5, the Pick-and-Roll mechanic and the ESPN presentation, he critiqued the animations and physics, the glitches, and that the Rising Star mode wasn't fully built yet. GameSpot gave the game a 4/10, writing: "The on-court action is so sloppy and unsatisfying that even rubbing defeat in Carmelo Anthony's face loses its appeal. NBA Live needs serious work in just about every aspect in order to raise its game to a respectable level."

In November 2013, EA apologized for the low quality of the game. Executive producer Sean O'Brien stated "As you can imagine, this isn't exactly the NBA Live comeback story we were hoping for this year. We hear loud and clear that some of you are disappointed in various aspects of NBA Live 14, and I'm sorry if the game doesn't live up to your expectations."
