= 2K14 =

2K14 may refer to:

- the year 2014
- WWE 2K14, a video game of professional wrestling
- NBA 2K14, a video game of basketball
