= Team USA Basketball (video game) =

1992 video game

- European Mega Drive box art
- Developer: Electronic Arts
- Publisher: Electronic Arts (Note: Originally released under the Electronic Arts Sports Network banner)
- Designers: Lisa Ching; Edwin W. Reich Jr. Jeff A. Lefferts
- Programmers: Jeff A. Lefferts; Lisa Ching; Edwin W. Reich Jr.
- Composer: Rob Hubbard
- Series: NBA Playoffs
- Platform: Sega Genesis/Mega Drive
- Release: NA: August 1992; EU: October 7, 1992
- Genre: Sports (basketball)
- Modes: Single-player, Multiplayer

Team USA Basketball is a 1992 sports video game released on the Sega Genesis. The game is a spinoff following the success of the Bulls vs Lakers video game as well as the popularity explosion of the 1992 United States men's Olympic basketball team, also known as the "Dream Team". It is the third game in the NBA Playoffs series of games.

A three-card set was bundled with each copy of the game. Put together, the cards showed the entire roster against a sky background with the words, "BARCELONA '92" in red and white.

== Gameplay ==
The game could be played in various ways: players could play against each other, or against the computer. Games against the computer were divided into two modes, "Exhibition" or "Tournament". Players could pick from one of the countries around the world to represent in the Olympics:

- United States
- Yugoslavia
- Angola
- Australia
- Canada
- China
- CIS
- Croatia
- France
- Italy
- Lithuania
- Slovenia
- Netherlands
- Spain

In the actual Olympic tournament, Croatia took the silver medal in the USA's closest match, with Lithuania taking bronze after being defeated by the US in the semi-finals.

The player can also use an All-World team, comprising the best players among the non-US squads, including Toni Kukoč, Bill Wennington, Andrew Gaze, Rik Smits, Sarunas Marciulionis, Vlade Divac, Rick Fox, Alex Volkov, Dražen Petrović, Arvydas Sabonis, Jure Zdovc and Felix Courtinard.

Puerto Rico, Brazil, Germany and Venezuela participated at the 1992 Summer Olympics' men's basketball tournament but do not appear in the game. Meanwhile, six teams - Yugoslavia, Canada, France, Italy, Slovenia and the Netherlands - appear in the game but did not qualify for the actual Olympic tournament.

Games could be configured for international 20 minute halves. The court was also different from the usual NBA game since it followed international dimensions, with a trapezoidal area and a different 3-point line.

Reception

Review scores
Publication	Score
Mega	72%
MegaTech	80%

== USA Roster ==
The game had the entire Team USA Roster including late addition Clyde Drexler and NCAA star Christian Laettner.

The USA roster for the game is:

- 4 Christian Laettner – Duke University Blue Devils
- 5 David Robinson – San Antonio Spurs
- 6 Patrick Ewing – New York Knicks
- 7 Larry Bird – Boston Celtics
- 8 Scottie Pippen – Chicago Bulls
- 9 Michael Jordan – Chicago Bulls
- 10 Clyde Drexler – Portland Trail Blazers
- 11 Karl Malone – Utah Jazz
- 12 John Stockton – Utah Jazz
- 13 Chris Mullin – Golden State Warriors
- 14 Charles Barkley – Phoenix Suns
- 15 Magic Johnson – Free Agent; formerly with the Los Angeles Lakers

== Reception ==
Spanish magazine OK Consolas gave the game a score of 92.

== See also ==
- NBA 2K13 – video game featuring the 1992 USA basketball team
- List of Olympic video games
