= NBA Showdown (video game) =

1993 video game

- North American SNES box art
- Developer: EA Creative Development
- Publisher: EA Sports
- Series: NBA Playoffs
- Platforms: Super NES, Sega Genesis/Mega Drive
- Release: Super NES: NA: October 1993; Genesis/Mega Drive: PAL: March 29, 1994; NA: 1994
- Genre: Sports (basketball)
- Modes: Single-player, multiplayer

NBA Showdown is a 1993 basketball video game developed by EA Creative Development and published by EA Sports for the Super Nintendo Entertainment System. The game is a sequel to Bulls vs. Blazers video game. The game was re-released for the Sega Genesis/Mega Drive as NBA Showdown '94. It is the fifth and final game in the NBA Playoffs series of games, before the series was rebranded as NBA Live.

== Play mode ==
The game could be played in various ways: players could play against each other, or against the computer. Games against the computer were divided into two levels, "exhibition" or "playoffs". Players could pick from any of the NBA teams for the first time, including non-playoff teams. Games could be configured for 2, 5, 8, or 12 minute quarters.

== History ==
Reception

Review scores
Publication	Score
AllGame	SNES: 3/5
Electronic Gaming Monthly	SMD: 6/10 (Note: In Electronic Gaming Monthly's review of NBA Showdown 94, three critics scored it 6/10, one 5/10, another 7.); SNES: 7/10
GameFan	SMD: 91%
GamePro	SMD: 3.625/5 (Note: GamePro scored NBA Showdown 94 two 4/5 scores for graphics and fun factor, 3.5/5 for sound, and 3/5 for control.)
Hyper	SMD: 87%
Nintendo Power	SNES: 3.375/5 (Note: Nintendo Power scored NBA Showdown 3.3/5 for graphics/sound, 3.2/5 for play control, 3.4/5 for challenge, and 3.6/5 for theme/fun.)
Superjuegos	SNES: 84/100
Super Play	SNES: 89%
Total!	SNES: 50%
Video Games (DE)	SMD & SNES: 77%

- It was one of the first basketball games (at least in terms of technically EA Sports series of NBA Live games) to feature every NBA team in the league. Tecmo NBA Basketball, which was released in 1992, was the first game to do so.
- It was the first basketball game to feature in-game 3rd party advertisements for companies like Starter and Topps stadium.
- It was the first game to deviate from the traditional Eastern Conference finals team vs Western Conference finals team naming convention. Sequentially this title should have been called Bulls versus Suns following the 1993 Finals. There were controversies as to whether star players like Charles Barkley opting out of the players licensing had a profound effect on EA changing to a more generic name like NBA Showdown.
- It was the first basketball game in which EA Sports, the entity, within EA officially took over the game.
- It was the last basketball game produced at EA's San Mateo studio before production moved to Vancouver for the NBA Live series.
- It was the first EA Sports game to have the tenths of a second rule in the last minute.
- The Super NES version was the last NBA game to feature Michael Jordan before the release of NBA Live 2000 years after.
