= NBA Live 2002 =

2001 basketball video game

- Cover art featuring Steve Francis
- Developers: PlayStation: NuFX; Xbox/PlayStation 2: EA Canada
- Publisher: Electronic Arts
- Series: NBA Live
- Platforms: PlayStation 2, PlayStation, Xbox
- Release: PlayStation, PlayStation 2: NA: October 30, 2001; EU: November 23, 2001; Xbox: NA: November 15, 2001; EU: March 14, 2002
- Genre: Sports (Basketball)
- Modes: Single-player, Multiplayer

NBA Live 2002 is the 2002 installment of the NBA Live video games series. The cover features Steve Francis as a member of the Houston Rockets. The game was developed by EA Sports and released on October 30, 2001, for the PlayStation 2 and PlayStation, and November 15, 2001, for the Xbox. This game was commentated by Don Poier and former NBA player Bob Elliot. It was a launch title for Xbox in North America and Europe.

== Soundtrack ==
- Moka Only - Crunch
- Moka Only (feat Abstract Rude) - Rolling Along
- Swollen Members - Lady Venom
- Swollen Members - Deep End
- The Crystal Method - The Winner

== Reception ==
Reception

Aggregate score
| Aggregator | Score | | |
| Aggregator | PS | PS2 | Xbox |
|---|---|---|---|
| Metacritic | 81/100 | 70/100 | 76/100 |

Review scores
| Publication | Score | | |
| Publication | PS | PS2 | Xbox |
|---|---|---|---|
| Electronic Gaming Monthly | N/A | 4.83/10 (Note: Three critics of Electronic Gaming Monthly gave the PlayStation 2 version each a score of 4.5/10, 6/10, and 4/10.) | N/A |
| Famitsu | N/A | 29/40 | 28/40 |
| Game Informer | N/A | 8.5/10 | 8.5/10 |
| GameRevolution | N/A | C | C |
| GameSpot | N/A | 7.7/10 | 7.7/10 |
| GameSpy | N/A | N/A | 60% |
| GameZone | 8.5/10 | N/A | N/A |
| IGN | N/A | 7.6/10 | 7.8/10 |
| Next Generation | N/A | N/A | 2/5 |
| Official U.S. PlayStation Magazine | 3.5/5 | 2.5/5 | N/A |
| Official Xbox Magazine (US) | N/A | N/A | 7.6/10 |
| X-Play | N/A | 3/5 | N/A |

The PlayStation and Xbox versions received "generally favorable reviews", while the PlayStation 2 version received "average" reviews, according to video game review aggregator Metacritic. NextGen said in its final issue, "This Xbox version of EA Sports' hoops series is basically the same game you can find on every other platform – in other words, chock full of uninspiring graphics, plodding gameplay, and clumsy controls." In Japan, where the PlayStation 2 version was ported and published by Electronic Arts on January 1, 2002, followed by the Xbox version on March 7, Famitsu gave it a score of 29 out of 40 for the former, and 28 out of 40 for the latter.

Dan Elektro of GamePro's January 2002 issue said that the PlayStation 2 version "makes up for last year's missteps and then some. The gameplay finally matches the graphics, and the result is what basketball fans want and need in a PS2 game." (Note: GamePro gave the PlayStation 2 version two 4.5/5 scores for graphics and fun factor, and two 4/5 scores for sound and control.) An issue later, he said that the Xbox version "sets a great standard for Xbox basketball", (Note: GamePro gave the Xbox version two 4.5/5 scores for graphics and fun factor, 4/5 for sound, and 3.5/5 for control.) and that the PlayStation version "comes packed with all the gameplay and features you expect: lengthy season modes, a 1-on-1 streetball mode with any player in the league, and create-a-player options." (Note: GamePro gave the PlayStation version 3.5/5 for graphics, 3/5 for sound, 4.5/5 for control, and 4/5 for fun factor.)
