= NBA Live 13 =

Canceled basketball video game

- Developer: EA Tiburon
- Publisher: EA Sports
- Series: NBA Live
- Platforms: Xbox 360, PlayStation 3
- Release: Cancelled
- Genre: Sports
- Modes: Single-player, Multiplayer

NBA Live 13 was a cancelled installment in the NBA Live series, developed and published by Electronic Arts (EA). The game was to be a reboot of the series and would be departing from previous entries, with the focus on an "all-new experience that captures on the future of basketball". NBA Live 13 was to be released for Xbox 360 and PlayStation 3. There were reports that the game could have been released on Xbox Live Arcade and the PlayStation Network. However, on September 27, 2012, EA confirmed on their website that the game's launch had been cancelled due to the game's "disappointing" development. EA Vice President Andrew Wilson said the company would focus on the quality of the next year's title.
