= NBA Live 95 =

1994 basketball video game

- Cover featuring the 1994 NBA Finals between Houston Rockets and New York Knicks
- Developer: EA Canada (credited as Hitmen Productions)
- Publisher: EA Sports
- Composer: Traz Damji
- Series: NBA Live
- Platforms: MS-DOS, Genesis, Super NES
- Release: Super NES; NA: October 1994; EU: 1994; JP: December 16, 1994; Genesis; NA: 1994; EU: October 28, 1994; DOS; NA: 1995
- Genre: Traditional basketball simulation
- Modes: Single-player, Multiplayer

NBA Live 95 is the follow-up to NBA Showdown and the first NBA Live title in the NBA Live video games series from EA Sports. It was published by EA Sports and released in October 1994. The cover features an action shot from the 1994 NBA Finals.

It introduced what would become standard elements in the series, including the isometric on-court perspective and the turbo button used to give players a temporary burst of speed. The game's engine is a modified version of EA Sports' FIFA International Soccer engine, using the same perspective. The game was re-released with NBA Live 06 as part of the EA Retro Series. Game Players gave the Super NES version its "best sports game award" in their Super NES division on the January 1995 issue of their magazine.

NBA Live 95 was followed by NBA Live 96.

== Version differences ==
The SNES version of the game featured the 1993-94 NBA rosters, while the Genesis version of the game featured the up-to-date 1994-95 rosters (minus most of the year's rookie class). Both versions featured limited roster management functions, however in the Genesis version, only players in the starting lineup could be traded. Additionally, there was no Create-a-Player function or a Free Agent pool to draw from.

The PC release featured updated rosters accurate as of the 1994–95 season's trade deadline, and included the entire rookie class of 1994.

The Sega Genesis version was included in the PlayStation 2 version of NBA Live 06.

== Reception ==
Reception

Review scores
| Publication | Score |
|---|---|
| AllGame | 4.5/5 (SNES) |
| Famitsu | 8/10 (SNES) |
| Next Generation | 5/5 (SNES) |
| CD Player | 8/10 (PC) |

GamePro wrote of the SNES version that it "improves on last year's NBA Showdown with better graphics, more in-depth strategy, and more realistic game play." They particularly praised the game's 30-degree-overhead court view, saying it allows players a better view of the action while allowing the game to run more smoothly. In February 1995, Famitsu magazine's Reader Cross Review gave the Super Famicom version of the game an 8 out of 10.

GamePro rated the Genesis version positively, though they commented that the cooperative multiplayer tends to be confusing. They noted that players take command of basketball players, coaches, and general managers, saying that this adds variety and depth to the gameplay.

Next Generation review of the SNES version rated it five stars out of five, stating, "Live '95 emerges as the best basketball sim' available."

In 1996, Computer Gaming World declared the original NBA Live the 57th-best computer game ever released.

The game's notable success helped launch EA's other sports games. Both Madden NFL '95 and Triple Play Baseball outsold their competitors, NFL '95 and World Series Baseball, respectively, for the first time following NBA Live's release.
