= NBA Live 19 =

2018 basketball video game

- Cover art featuring Joel Embiid
- Developer: EA Tiburon
- Publisher: EA Sports
- Series: NBA Live
- Engine: Ignite
- Platforms: PlayStation 4, Xbox One
- Release: WW: September 7, 2018
- Genre: Sports
- Modes: Single-player, multiplayer

NBA Live 19 is a basketball simulation video game developed by EA Tiburon and published by EA Sports. It features Joel Embiid of the Philadelphia 76ers as its cover athlete and was released for PlayStation 4 and Xbox One on September 7, 2018. It was the 22nd and last installment in the NBA Live series and the follow-up to 2017's NBA Live 18 while being the latest entry in the franchise to date as of 2026. It received mixed-to-positive reviews from critics, who praised the improved gameplay, new additions and modes but criticized the AI and animations. On January 30, 2026, the online servers for the game were shut down.

== Features ==
NBA Live 19 features Joel Embiid of the Philadelphia 76ers on the cover. Much like EA's Madden NFL 19, gameplay improvements include the introduction of real-player motion and the expansion of one-on-one features. It is also the first basketball game to include the option to create a female player. In addition, NBA Live 19 received a new commentary team of New York Knicks radio play-by-play announcer Ed Cohen and ESPN basketball analyst Jay Williams, replacing Mike Breen and Jeff Van Gundy, who voiced the NBA Live series since NBA Live 14 and the canceled NBA Elite 11. New presentation elements debuted for this season, and career mode is enhanced with streetballer Grayson "The Professor" Boucher and ESPN's First Take as co-hosts Stephen A. Smith and Max Kellerman, among others, reacting to player performances.

=== Career Mode – "The One" ===
Career mode includes online features as well as offline modes, known collectively as "The One" for both NBA and street games. Players create either a male or female player followed by choosing to play as a guard, wing, or power forward/center. Players choose play styles determined by two upgradeable initial attributes and three unlockable attributes. They can then choose an icon corresponding to either a current NBA star or NBA legend that determines a special ability and an extra attribute that can be upgraded as well as various boosts as the character gains experience. Moreover, three WNBA stars also have icons inspired by them. For example, a player who creates a slashing guard can choose Beast Mode based on Russell Westbrook to increase dunking, The Answer based on Allen Iverson to increase steals or The Spark based on Candace Parker to increase shot blocking. The 25 icons and their associated players are as follows:

Play Style	Current NBA Icon	Classic NBA Icon	WNBA Icon
Guards
Backcourt Shooter	Chef; Stephen Curry, Golden State Warriors	Sniper; Ray Allen, Milwaukee Bucks	none
Slasher	Beast Mode; Russell Westbrook, Oklahoma City Thunder	The Answer; Allen Iverson, Philadelphia 76ers	The Spark; Candace Parker, Los Angeles Sparks
Backcourt Defender	The Wizard; John Wall, Washington Wizards	The Glove; Gary Payton, Seattle SuperSonics	none
Floor General	Point Gawd; Chris Paul, Houston Rockets	Maestro; Jason Kidd, Dallas Mavericks	none
Wings
Wing Shooter	The Reaper; Kevin Durant, Golden State Warriors	The Legend; Larry Bird, Boston Celtics	Triple Threat; Elena Delle Donne, Washington Mystics
Wing Scorer	The Assassin; DeMar DeRozan, San Antonio Spurs	Vinsanity; Vince Carter, Toronto Raptors	none
Wing Defender	The Claw; Kawhi Leonard, Toronto Raptors	Pip; Scottie Pippen, Chicago Bulls	none
Playmaker	The King; LeBron James, Los Angeles Lakers	Magic; Earvin "Magic" Johnson, Los Angeles Lakers	none
Bigs
Post Anchor	The Process; Joel Embiid, Philadelphia 76ers	The Dream; Hakeem Olajuwon, Houston Rockets	The Phenom; Brittney Griner, Phoenix Mercury
Rim Protector	The Evolution; Anthony Davis, New Orleans Pelicans	The Mountain; Dikembe Mutombo, Denver Nuggets	none
Stretch Big	Big Kat; Karl-Anthony Towns, Minnesota Timberwolves	The Marksman; Dirk Nowitzki, Dallas Mavericks	none

Attributes and Skills Breakdown

Every player has 6 different skill categories: Interior Offense, Interior Defense, Perimeter Offense, Perimeter Defense, Playmaking and Athleticism. All 6 categories are made up of 24 attributes (there are 25 attributes in the game, but "Injury" is an auto-generated number that can't be increased or decreased by a player, and "Draw Shooting Foul" isn't assigned to any of the 6 categories). Below is a breakdown of what attributes are included in each skill category.

Interior Offense

   - Driving Layup
   - Dunk
   - Inside Shot
   - Post Moves

Interior Defense

   - Defensive Awareness
   - Post Defense
   - Rebounding
   - Shot Block

Perimeter Offense

   - 3-Pt Shot
   - Contested Shot
   - Free Throw
   - Mid-Range Shot
   - Shot Off Dribble

Perimeter Defense

   - On-Ball Defense
   - Steal

Playmaking

   - Court Vision
   - Dribbling
   - Passing

Athleticism

   - Injury
   - Speed
   - Stamina
   - Strength
   - Vertical

Note - Depending on the player's position and their playstyle, all 25 attributes are grouped into Primary, Secondary, and Minor sub-sections. Primary are attributes that strongly affect the player's OVR. Secondary attributes slightly affect the player's OVR. Minor attributes have very little to no effect on the player's OVR. These 3 groups distinguish what attributes are important for each position/playstyle. For example: A Point-Guard/Backcourt Defender will have a high Perimeter Defense, as On-Ball Defense and Steal are important attributes to succeed in. But a Shooting-Guard/Slasher will be more focused on increasing their Dribbling and Layup attributes.

=== Court battles ===
Along with Live Run and Live Events as live multiplayer, the Court Battles mode allows each player to create and customize a home court and then specify a rule set (for example, Meet Me at the Rim, where bonus points are given for dunks and blocks) and a team to defend it. At the same time, the player tries to win games on opponents' home courts to take control of them. Unique rewards are available in this mode, including unlocking star players for Court Battles and the Streets World Tour. Each player may use a created player from The One for away games in this mode as long as the created player meets the home court requirements set by the defending team.

=== Soundtrack ===
The game's soundtrack features over 20 songs, including songs by Migos, J. Cole, Logic, Injury Reserve and Lil Pump. It was made available for streaming on Spotify.

== Reception ==
Reception

Aggregate score
Aggregator	Score
Metacritic	(XONE) 75/100 (PS4) 73/100

Review scores
Publication	Score
Electronic Gaming Monthly	4/5
Game Informer	7/10
GameSpot	7/10
Hardcore Gamer	4/5
IGN	7.9/10
Push Square	6/10
USgamer	3.5/5

NBA Live 19 was assigned "mixed or average" reviews on the PlayStation 4 and "generally favorable" reviews for the Xbox One by review aggregator Metacritic. Prior to its release, some reviewers questioned whether or not the game would be released due to the tepid reception and poor overall sales numbers of NBA Live 18.

IGN gave the game 7.9/10, saying: "I was pleasantly surprised by how much I liked playing NBA Live 19. The core basketball game and its various modes offer plenty of chances to have a fun basketball experience... NBA Live 19 is great at simulating basketball and has fun modes to shake things up, but its personality comes up a bit short." In its 7/10 review, GameSpot said, "NBA Live 19 is a capable and competent basketball game that offers a multitude of different ways to play and numerous reasons to keep coming back. Its impressive attention to detail complements the strong foundation set by its presentation and gameplay. However, the AI logic and animation problems are impossible to ignore given they're at the heart of the experience the entire game is based on."

=== Accolades ===
The game was nominated for "Control Design, 2D or Limited 3D" and "Control Precision" at the National Academy of Video Game Trade Reviewers Awards in 2019.
