= NHL 2017 =

NHL 2017 may refer to:

- 2016–17 NHL season
- 2017–18 NHL season
- NHL 17, video game
- 2017 National Hurling League
