= NBA Live 09 =

2008 video game

- Cover art featuring Tony Parker
- Developers: EA Canada (PS3, Xbox 360); HB Studios (Wii, PSP, PS2)
- Publisher: Electronic Arts
- Series: NBA Live
- Platforms: PlayStation 2 PlayStation 3 PlayStation Portable; Wii; Xbox 360
- Release: NA: October 7, 2008; AU: October 9, 2008; EU: October 10, 2008
- Genre: Sports
- Modes: Single-player, multiplayer

NBA Live 09, sometimes called NBA Live 2009, is the 2008 installment in the NBA Live series, developed and published by Electronic Arts. The original release date was October 7, 2008. The game features Tony Parker of the San Antonio Spurs on the cover in most markets. The Wii version of the game, developed by HB Studios, is titled NBA Live 09 All-Play and launched under EA Sports' new All-Play brand exclusive to the platform. This was the final NBA Live game to be released for the Wii as well as the final game in the series to be generally available on a Nintendo platform and the last for the PlayStation 2.

== Cover ==
While Parker appears on the cover in the US and most international markets, some international versions feature players from those areas:

- UK and Ireland: Luol Deng
- Italy: Andrea Bargnani (also appeared on the Italian cover of NBA Live 08)
- Spain: Pau Gasol (has appeared on the Spanish cover of all the versions since NBA Live 06)

== Features ==
=== Dynamic DNA ===
Dynamic DNA is a new feature in NBA Live 09 for the PlayStation 2, PlayStation 3, Xbox 360, and Wii, though it is not available for the PlayStation Portable. It breaks down how a team scores, sets up offense and how individual players go about on offense. It also updates players accessories, haircuts, facial hair changes and shoes. It is updated daily through NBA Live 365.

=== NBA LIVE 365 ===
NBA Live 365 is an addition to the NBA Live franchise. An update is downloadable every three or four months, updating player trades/injured players.

=== Live Rewind ===
The gamer can replay previous games with the updated statistical data that recreates identical conditions including injuries, hot/cold streaks, tendencies, and player DNA. If the game player does not have internet the gamer can still play games from the playoffs of the 2007–08 season.

=== Pick-and-Roll Control ===
This two-man game mechanic lets the player control both the ball handler and the screener, as they set screens and run two man plays, with on court instructions popping up to guide them through each play.

=== 5-on-5 Online Play ===
Up to 5 players on each team for each starting position are user controlled. Club play allows the player's set team to play against other teams in a league type game as they gain rankings and move up divisions with each win. It is also possible to play on team play without a club.

=== Quickstrike Anklebreakers ===
A defender can be forced to step up and guess what the player will do next. Players can trigger the turbo button and use the right analog stick for ball-handling moves to fake out their defenders and create scoring opportunities.

=== Lockdown Defense ===
This feature allows a player to stay with his opponent the whole way and cause a turnover or bad shot.

=== Signature Play Calling ===
An in-game play calling system has been introduced. Linked to LIVE 365, this feature will suggest authentic plays for NBA's stars to run on the court. The gamer can bring up plays by pressing a button and tendencies of the player successfully completing that move will be displayed. The players who will be shown on the play calling menu can be changed by changing it in the options menu.

=== Expanded FIBA teams ===
There are now 24 FIBA teams compared to NBA Live 08, which only had 8. An international tournament using authentic FIBA rosters and teams is available.

== Reception ==
Reception

Aggregate score
Aggregator	Score				
Aggregator	PS2	PS3	PSP	Wii	Xbox 360
Metacritic	55/100	75/100	61/100	51/100	77/100

Review scores
Publication	Score				
Publication	PS2	PS3	PSP	Wii	Xbox 360
1Up.com	N/A	B	N/A	N/A	B
Famitsu	27/40	33/40	28/40	N/A	33/10
Game Informer	N/A	7.75/10	N/A	N/A	7.75/10
GameSpot	N/A	7.5/10	N/A	N/A	7.5/10
GameSpy	N/A	3.5/5	N/A	N/A	3.5/5
GameTrailers	N/A	6.9/10	N/A	N/A	N/A
GameZone	N/A	8.2/10	N/A	N/A	8/10
IGN	5.5/10	6.5/10	6.1/10	5.4/10	N/A
Nintendo Life	N/A	N/A	N/A	7/10	N/A
Nintendo Power	N/A	N/A	N/A	4/10	N/A
Official Xbox Magazine (US)	N/A	N/A	N/A	N/A	8/10
PlayStation: The Official Magazine	N/A	4/5	N/A	N/A	N/A
411Mania	N/A	N/A	N/A	N/A	8.9/10

The Xbox 360 and PlayStation 3 versions received "generally favorable reviews", while the PSP, PlayStation 2, and Wii versions received "mixed" reviews, according to video game review aggregator Metacritic. In Japan, Famitsu gave the game a score of three eights and one nine for the PS3 and Xbox 360 versions; all four sevens for the PSP version; and two sevens, one six, and one seven for the PS2 version.

GameSpot nominated the game for the dubious honor of Least Improved Sequel in its 2008 video game awards (the award went to Animal Crossing: City Folk).

== See also ==
- NBA 2K9
