= NBA Live 2001 =

2000 basketball video game

- European PlayStation cover art featuring Kevin Garnett
- Developer: EA Canada
- Publisher: EA Sports
- Series: NBA Live
- Platforms: PlayStation, PlayStation 2, Windows
- Release: PlayStation: NA: October 12, 2000; EU: November 10, 2000; PlayStation 2: NA: January 23, 2001; EU: February 23, 2001; Windows: NA: February 13, 2001; EU: March 2, 2001
- Genre: Sports (Basketball)
- Modes: Single-player, Multiplayer

NBA Live 2001 is the 2001 installment of the NBA Live video games series. The cover features Kevin Garnett as a member of the Minnesota Timberwolves. The game was developed by EA Canada and published by Electronic Arts under the EA Sports Label. NBA Live 2001 is followed by NBA Live 2002. The PC version of the game for the second year included EA's "Face in the Game" feature that debuted in NBA Live 2000, allowing players to use custom facial photographs on created players.

== Gameplay ==
In NBA Live 2001, the player can run a full NBA season with complete stat tracking, guiding a chosen team through its schedule toward the championship. Exhibition games allow up to eight players to compete using a Multitap, and additional modes include one‑on‑one matches featuring Michael Jordan and a three‑point shootout against any NBA opponent. Season play begins with drafting teams and setting preferences such as game length, season length, and gameplay options. Players may also create custom athletes, who can then be drafted into season or exhibition play. An arcade mode is available, featuring exaggerated moves and effects. A challenge mode tasks the player with completing specific objectives—such as achieving a triple‑double—to earn points that can be spent on attribute upgrades for created players or to unlock new courts. The game includes updated rosters for all 31 NBA teams and offers access to classic dynasty teams. On the court, players control actions such as shooting, passing, turbo movement, jumping, spinning, juking, crossover dribbling, faking, calling for picks, posting up with multiple move options, and using icon passing. Defensive controls include facing up on an opponent, calling for double teams, and attempting steals or blocks. The computer‑controlled teams adjust their behavior based on game situations, including passing to the post when double‑teamed, taking open jump shots, slowing the pace when leading late, calling timeouts, or intentionally fouling when behind.

== Reception ==
Reception

Aggregate score
Aggregator	Score		
Aggregator	PC	PS	PS2
Metacritic	78/100	86/100	74/100

Review scores
Publication	Score		
Publication	PC	PS	PS2
CNET Gamecenter	N/A	7/10	N/A
Computer Gaming World	3/5	N/A	N/A
Electronic Gaming Monthly	N/A	7.5/10 (Note: Three critics of Electronic Gaming Monthly gave the PlayStation version each a score of 7/10, 8/10, and 7.5/10.)	6.67/10 (Note: Three critics of Electronic Gaming Monthly gave the PlayStation 2 version each a score of 8/10, 7/10, and 5/10.)
EP Daily	N/A	9/10	8/10
Famitsu	N/A	N/A	29/40
Game Informer	N/A	8/10	8.25/10
GameFan	N/A	89% (Note: In GameFan's viewpoint of the PlayStation version, one critic gave it 84, and the other 94.)	N/A
GameRevolution	N/A	N/A	B
GameSpot	8/10	8.9/10	8.5/10
GameSpy	85%	87%	60%
IGN	8.3/10	9/10	7.4/10
Next Generation	N/A	3/5	4/5
Official U.S. PlayStation Magazine	N/A	4/5	3/5
PC Gamer (US)	65%	N/A	N/A
The Cincinnati Enquirer	N/A	N/A	4.5/5
Maxim	N/A	N/A	8/10

The PlayStation and PC versions received "generally favorable reviews", while the PlayStation 2 version received "average" reviews, according to video game review aggregator Metacritic. Emmett Schkloven of NextGen said of the PS version, "If you like the franchise, it's a mild improvement. If you're not crazy about videogame basketball, this will not be the game to convert you." Rob Smolka of the same magazine later said of the PS2 version, "It's good looking and [it] plays well, but it isn't quite the leap it should (and arguably could) have been." In Japan, where the same console version was ported and published by Electronic Arts Victor on February 22, 2001, Famitsu gave it a score of 29 out of 40.

Gil Alexander Shif of GameZone gave the PC version 9.5 out of 10, calling it "the best basketball game you can buy for the PC, period." However, Michael Lafferty gave the PlayStation version 8 out of 10, calling it "a wonderful journey with the elite of the basketball world, providing a variety of options that will appeal to a variety of players and skills." William Abner of Computer Games Strategy Plus gave the PC version three stars out of five, saying, "NBA Live 2001 isn't a bad game. In fact, if you skipped last year's version you'll probably want to check it out. For longtime fans of the series there simply isn't enough new stuff to get excited about, however, and for every improvement there are missing features and lingering problems that drag the game down."

Human Tornado of GamePro said of the PlayStation version in one review, "If you want a game that's more tailored to individual play rather than team cooperation, then NBA Live is a great choice. It also ekes out a slightly better score on the graphics front, and there are some extra bells and whistles like the one-on-one game. Still, this year's hoops head-to-head is a very close call. Both ShootOut and Live will give gamers a run for their money, and they both have excellent production values. For this season it's really just a matter of taste." (Note: GamePro gave the PlayStation version two 5/5 scores for graphics and fun factor, 4.5/5 for sound, and 4/5 for control in one review.) In another GamePro review, Dan Elektro said of the same console version, "As usual, it's EA's attention to detail that lifts Live up above the competition. The changes aren't too dramatic from last year – they're tweaks, really – but the improved graphics and new Challenge mode make it worth the price. If you're looking for the best of the class of '01, Live is it." (Note: GamePro gave the PlayStation version 4.5/5 each for graphics, sound, control, and fun factor in another review.) However, Uncle Dust said of the PlayStation 2 version, "This ProReview may sound like a long list of complaints, yet overall NBA Live 2001 is the best hoops game on the PS2." (Note: GamePro gave the PlayStation 2 version two 4.5/5 scores for graphics and sound, and two 4/5 scores for control and fun factor.)

The PlayStation version of the game ranked 9th on NPD's list of Top Titles by units during the period from October 29 to November 11 in 2000.
