= Bulls vs. Blazers and the NBA Playoffs =

1992 video game

- European Mega Drive cover featuring (left to right) Terry Porter, Horace Grant, Scottie Pippen, Clifford Robinson, Kevin Duckworth and Will Perdue
- Developer: Electronic Arts
- Publisher: Electronic Arts (Note: Originally released in North America under the Electronic Arts Sports Network banner and in Europe under the EA Sports label.)
- Producer: Don Traeger
- Composer: Michael Bartlow
- Series: NBA Playoffs
- Platforms: Super NES, Sega Genesis/Mega Drive
- Release: Super NES: NA: December 1992; EU: 1992; Genesis/Mega Drive: NA/EU: 1993
- Genre: Sports (basketball)
- Modes: Single-player, multiplayer

Bulls vs. Blazers and the NBA Playoffs is a basketball video game developed and published by Electronic Arts, first released for the Super Nintendo Entertainment System in 1992. The following year, it was released for the Sega Genesis. It was then later released for the Mega Drive, under the title NBA Playoffs: Bulls vs Blazers.

The game is the sequel to Bulls vs Lakers and the NBA Playoffs. Like its predecessor, the game's title refers to the previous season's NBA championship series, the 1992 NBA Finals match-up between the Chicago Bulls and Portland Trail Blazers.

It is the first EA basketball game to feature in-game advertisements with the company's "EA Sports" logo.

== Gameplay ==
The game can be played in various ways: Players can play against each other or one player can face the CPU. Games against the CPU are divided into two modes: "One Game" or "Tournament". The latter simulates the 1992 NBA Playoffs. "Play Option" can be set to "Arcade" or "Simulation". The former allows for unlimited fouls and players do not get fatigued. "Play Level" (Difficulty) has three settings: "Pre-Season", "Reg-Season", and "Showtime". Games can be configured for 2, 5, 8, or 12 minute quarters. Players can pick from one of the 16 teams who competed in the 1992 NBA Playoffs, or can choose one of that season's All-Star teams.

Each team features at least one player with a signature move known as a "Marquee Shot". These only occur when a player presses the correct button under the right circumstances. The list of players for whom there exists a "Marquee Shot" is posted in the instruction manual. However, the move for some players will vary depending on the version of the game. Some examples are Michael Jordan's "Kiss the Rim", Larry Bird's "Turn Around Jumper/Fade Away Jump Shot", Earvin Johnson's "Fake No-Look Pass Into Lay-Up", Tim Hardaway's "UTEP 2-Step", Shawn Kemp's "Off-the-Glass Jam", Larry Nance's "Around the World Jam", Isiah Thomas' "Spinning 360 Lay-Up", Billy Owens' "Alley-Oop Slam", and Karl Malone's "In Your Face Slam".

== Teams ==
Western Conference:

- Portland Trail Blazers
- Los Angeles Clippers
- Utah Jazz
- Los Angeles Lakers
- San Antonio Spurs
- Phoenix Suns
- Seattle SuperSonics
- Golden State Warriors
- All Stars West

Eastern Conference:

- Chicago Bulls
- Cleveland Cavaliers
- Boston Celtics
- Miami Heat
- New York Knicks
- New Jersey Nets
- Indiana Pacers
- Detroit Pistons
- All Stars East

== Reception ==
Super Gamer reviewed the SNES version and gave an overall score of 79%, calling it "a comprehensive Basketball sim with great FX and music. Unfortunately, it runs too slowly." In 2018, Complex placed the game at number 95 on their list of "The Best Super Nintendo Games of All Time".
