= NBA Live 98 =

1997 basketball video game

- PlayStation cover art featuring Miami Heat's Tim Hardaway.
- Developers: EA Canada (PC, PS); Tiertex (Genesis, SNES); Realtime Associates (Saturn)
- Publishers: EA Sports (PlayStation, Sega Saturn, Windows); THQ (SNES, Genesis)
- Composers: Brian L. Schmidt (Genesis); Mark Ortiz (SNES); Traz Damji (PC)
- Series: NBA Live
- Platforms: Windows, PlayStation, Sega Saturn, Super NES, Genesis
- Release: October 28, 1997: Windows; NA: October 28, 1997; EU: 1997; PlayStation; NA: November 12, 1997; EU: December 1997 Genesis; NA: December 2, 1997; Sega Saturn; NA: December 17, 1997; EU: 1997; Super NES; NA: February 1998
- Genre: Sports (Basketball)
- Modes: Single-player, multiplayer

NBA Live 98 is a basketball video game based on the National Basketball Association and the fourth installment of the NBA Live series. Its cover art features Tim Hardaway of the Miami Heat. The game was published by EA Sports in 1997 for Windows, PlayStation, and Sega Saturn, while also being the final NBA Live game released for the Super NES, Genesis, and Sega Saturn.

The game introduced the now-standard feature of passing to any teammate with a single button press. Its graphical improvements included new player designs modeled after actual player photographs. The PC version introduced support for 3D acceleration, utilizing 3dfx's Glide API. The PlayStation, PC, and Saturn versions feature Ernie Johnson Jr. as studio announcer. Play-by-play commentary is performed by TNT/TBS color analyst Verne Lundquist in the PlayStation and PC versions. The game was met with generally positive reviews, with praise for its graphics and new gameplay features, though the Saturn port was criticized as being a slipshod conversion. NBA Live 98 is followed by NBA Live 99.

== Gameplay ==
The game features rosters from the 1997–98 NBA season. New features include the "Total Control" system, that allows players to choose between a dunk or layup or pass to any teammate with the press of a button. "Tight" player moves allow players to spin, crossover, back down, ball fake and more on command. Player lock lets players always control a specified player on court.

Though it is set during the 1997–98 season, Chicago Bulls superstar Michael Jordan is not featured in the game. This was because Jordan was not part of the National Basketball Players Association and at the time the cost of licensing his individual name and likeness for video games was approximately $15 million a year, beyond the total budget of most video games. Jordan is replaced by the fictional "Roster Player" in the Bulls lineup. However, Charles Barkley made his first appearance in Live 98 as a member of the Houston Rockets.

Motion capture work was done by NBA players Tim Hardaway, Mitch Richmond, Larry Johnson, Joe Dumars and Christian Laettner.

=== Features ===
New modes introduced include GM Mode, which lets players choose franchises, draft players and play custom seasons, and the Three-Point Shootout, which can be played using full or split screen. Four difficulty levels are available, including a new Superstar difficulty level, along with improved AI with smarter players and more accurate stats.

With the introduction of 3D players, courts, and jerseys came an opportunity to patch and update these aspects of the game, including with the EA Graphics Editor software.

== Reception ==
Reception

Review scores
Publication	Score
Electronic Gaming Monthly	8.125/10 (PS1); 6.5/10 (SAT)
GameSpot	7.9/10 (PS1); 4.4/10 (SAT); 8.1/10 (PC)
IGN	8/10 (PS1)
Sega Saturn Magazine	70% (SAT)

The PlayStation release received mostly positive reviews. Critics praised the detailed player graphics, new animations, interface, music, and the full motion video sequences. GamePro commented, "What makes Live '98 so enjoyable to play is its fantastic mixture of NBA realism and wild arcade action." GameSpot assessed it as an across-the-board improvement over NBA Live 97.

Critics hailed the number of new gameplay features, with the three-point competition, custom team feature, icon passing, and direct ducking all earning particular mention. A few criticisms were voiced, but they did little to impact the critic's overall recommendation. For example, Jay Boor of IGN found the dunks were not as dramatic as they should be, but still concluded NBA Live 98 to be the best basketball game presently on the market. Sushi-X wrote in Electronic Gaming Monthly that weak A.I. makes it "the easiest basketball game I've ever played." However, his three co-reviewers were more laudatory, with Kraig Kujawa summing up, "NBA Live 97 was easily the best basketball game last year, and now Live 98 has done it again."

As with NBA Live 97, critics reported the Saturn port to have much lower-resolution textures and jerkier frame rate than the PlayStation version, to the point where the action can be hard to follow. Critics also found the absence of play-by-play commentary in the Saturn port a severe shortcoming. Kraig Kujawa and John Ricciardi of Electronic Gaming Monthly, who both rated the PlayStation version a 9/10, gave the Saturn version a 5.5/10 and 6/10 respectively, with Kujawa remarking, "Obviously, this was a quick and easy port that was paid very little attention. ... EA could and should have done a better job." GameSpot and Sega Saturn Magazine, while noting that the Saturn port retains strong aspects of the PlayStation original, judged that it compared unfavorably with NBA Action 98, another Saturn basketball game which was released at the same time. Gary Cutlack of Sega Saturn Magazine summarized, "Live '98 isn't that bad, it's just unfortunate for EA that Sega are releasing their better NBA game at the same time."

NBA Live 98 was a runner-up for Computer Gaming World's 1997 "Sports Game of the Year" award, which ultimately went to Baseball Mogul and CART Precision Racing in a tie. Editors called NBA Live 98 "the latest and best [...] in EA's awesome action-oriented" series. During the inaugural Interactive Achievement Awards, the game received a nomination for "Console Sports Game of the Year" by the Academy of Interactive Arts & Sciences.
