= NBA Live 99 =

1998 basketball video game

- Cover art featuring Boston Celtics' Antoine Walker
- Developers: PlayStation/Windows: EA Canada; Nintendo 64: NuFX
- Publisher: EA Sports
- Composer: Traz Damji
- Series: NBA Live
- Engine: Virtual Stadium
- Platforms: PlayStation, Windows, Nintendo 64
- Release: Nintendo 64: NA: November 4, 1998; EU: December 1998; Windows, PlayStation: NA: November 10, 1998; EU: 1998
- Genre: Sports (Basketball)
- Modes: Single-player, Multiplayer

NBA Live 99 is the fifth installment of the NBA Live video games series. The cover features Antoine Walker of the Boston Celtics. The game was developed by EA Sports and released on November 4, 1998, for the Nintendo 64, and then on November 10, 1998, for the Windows and PlayStation. Don Poier is the play-by-play announcer. It was the first NBA Live game released for Nintendo 64. NBA Live 99 was followed by NBA Live 2000.

== Summary ==
NBA Live 99 is EA Sports' NBA release for the 1998–99 NBA season. Major additions include Practice Mode and multi-season play, which features player development between seasons. Although free agency or generated rookies were not included, this would be the forerunner to Franchise Mode.

Live 99 was shipped with 1997–98 NBA season rosters due to the 1998–99 NBA lockout, putting a hold on player movements and rookie signings during the summer of 1998. Prominent bugs led to the NBA Live Series Center fan site submitting a patch petition to EA Sports, resulting in two official patches which included roster updates for the 98–99 season.

As Live 99 kept the same file formats as Live 98, patchers were able to produce the same wide variety of patches using an updated version of the EA Graphics Editor and the NBA Live 99 Toolkit.

=== Features ===
LIVE Hoops

- Fresh new moves, including jab steps, fake passes and aggressive rebounding, plus high-flying new dunks.
- Real NBA stats, real NBA players, real NBA moves.
- Create a dynasty with new multiple seasons - players evolve over time.
- Enhanced GM mode with full NBA draft and realistic computer trading.

LIVE Technology

- New Sports Ticker via the Internet - check NBA scores as you play.
- Unreal 3D graphics with real-time lighting and hundreds of animations.
- Unbelievable player detail, including fully modeled heads and facial animations.

LIVE Style

- New Pro-Action AI includes smarter, more realistic player reactions.
- TV presentation - moving cameras focus on player highlights.
- New enhanced Play-by-Play and Color Commentary.

== Platform differences ==
The Nintendo 64 version is an updated port of NBA Live 98, which differs from the PC and PlayStation versions. The PC and PlayStation versions also featured a bug where players did not fatigue properly. The bug in the PC version was eventually patched.

== Reception ==
Reception

Aggregate score
Aggregator	Score		
Aggregator	N64	PC	PS
GameRankings	78%	86%	88%

Review scores
Publication	Score		
Publication	N64	PC	PS
CNET Gamecenter	8/10	8/10	N/A
Computer Gaming World	N/A	4.5/5	N/A
Electronic Gaming Monthly	7.5/10	N/A	8.67/10
Game Informer	7.25/10	N/A	7.75/10
GameFan	70% (Note: In GameFan's viewpoint of the Nintendo 64 version, one critic gave it a score of 68, and another gave it 71.)	N/A	90% (Note: In GameFan's viewpoint of the PlayStation version, one critic gave it a score of 91, and another gave it 89.)
GamePro	4.5/5 (Note: GamePro gave the Nintendo 64 version two 4.5/5 scores for graphics and overall fun factor, 3.5/5 for sound, and 4/5 for control.)	4.5/5 (Note: GamePro gave the PC version 4/5 for graphics, two 5.5 scores for sound and control, and 4.5/5 for overall fun factor.)	4.5/5 (Note: GamePro gave the PlayStation version 5/5 for graphics, two 4.5/5 scores for sound and overall fun factor, and 4/5 for control.)
GameRevolution	N/A	A−	B+
GameSpot	7.2/10	8.9/10	8/10
IGN	8/10	8.6/10	9/10
N64 Magazine	64%	N/A	N/A
Nintendo Power	7.1/10	N/A	N/A
Official U.S. PlayStation Magazine	N/A	N/A	4/5
PC Accelerator	N/A	8/10	N/A
PC Gamer (US)	N/A	92%	N/A
The Cincinnati Enquirer	N/A	4/4	N/A

The game received "favorable" reviews on all platforms according to video game review aggregator GameRankings. AllGame gave the PC version four stars out of five, saying that the game delivers "a full basketball experience. Multiple seasons could literally keep a player busy for years which makes one wonder if anyone will really need the next version." Computer Games Strategy Plus gave the same PC version three stars out of five, however, saying, "there's little compelling reason to choose NBA Live 99 over its previous version. Unlike the amazing FIFA games, the pressure to deliver an all-new game on a yearly basis is causing the NBA Live franchise to spin its wheels." In Japan, where the PlayStation version was ported for release on April 28, 1999, Famitsu gave it a score of 28 out of 40.

In its first month of release, the PlayStation version of NBA Live 99 was the seventh best-selling home console game in the United States. The PC version was nominated for the "Best Sports Game of the Year" award at IGN's Best of 1998 Awards, which ultimately went to NFL Blitz. It was also nominated for the "Sports Game of the Year" award at GameSpot's Best & Worst of 1998 Awards, which ultimately went to FIFA 99. However, it won the award for "Best Sports Game" at the Fifth Annual PC Gamer Awards.

== Notes ==
- Due to the NBA lockout, Live 99 featured final 1997–98 rosters accurate as of July 1, 1998, rather than early 1998–99 rosters featuring the draft class of 1998. EA Sports released two official patches, the first updating the rosters, adding the 50 game schedule and addressing several gameplay issues, while the second served as a midseason roster update.
- Multi-season play and Practice Mode were introduced in Live 99.
- Prior to the official roster update, Michael Jordan was once again represented by a "Roster Player" for the Chicago Bulls.
