= NBA Live 18 =

2017 basketball video game

- Cover art featuring James Harden
- Developer: EA Tiburon
- Publisher: EA Sports
- Series: NBA Live
- Engine: Ignite
- Platforms: PlayStation 4, Xbox One
- Release: WW: September 15, 2017
- Genre: Sports
- Modes: Single-player, multiplayer

NBA Live 18 is a basketball simulation video game developed by EA Tiburon and published by EA Sports, featuring James Harden of the Houston Rockets as its cover athlete. It was released for PlayStation 4 and Xbox One on September 15, 2017, as well as of their different version of the game NBA2K18. It is the 21st installment in the NBA Live series and the follow-up to 2015's NBA Live 16 after EA took a year off between games. Though it received criticism for its gameplay, the game was praised for improvements over recent installments and became the series' highest-rated game since NBA Live 10 according to Metacritic.

== Features ==
NBA Live 18 features Houston Rockets guard James Harden as the cover athlete. Harden previously shared the cover of NBA 2K16 with Steph Curry and Anthony Davis. The game's "UltimateTeam" mode allows players to draft different players to create a custom roster, similar to EA's Madden NFL franchise. It is the first basketball video game to feature a full WNBA roster. A single-player career mode, called "The One", is similar to 2K Sports' "MyCareer" mode. In this mode, the created player can use their skills across leagues and even join the NBA Draft and Combine, which features over-the-top analysis from segments of ESPN First Take, hosted by Max Kellerman and Stephen A. Smith. Hosts give their open-minded opinions in the direction the player is going to progress through the mode. The game mode allows players to experience basketball life both on- and off-court with more clothes and a Game Face app for iOS and Android devices, allowing players to scan their face for upload to the game.

=== Soundtrack ===
On August 8, 2017, EA Sports announced the soundtrack for the game, which would feature 31 songs, including Kendrick Lamar, Kid Cudi, Lil Uzi Vert and Rick Ross. The soundtrack was also made available for streaming on Spotify.

== Release ==
NBA Live 18 was released on September 15, 2017, several days before its rival, 2K Sports' NBA 2K18. In order to compete with 2K, EA announced all players who pre-order the game would receive the game for $39, compared to the standard $59 cost.

== Reception ==
Reception

Aggregate score
Aggregator	Score
Metacritic	(XONE) 72/100 (PS4) 72/100

Review scores
Publication	Score
Electronic Gaming Monthly	7.5/10
Game Informer	7/10
GameSpot	7/10
IGN	6.5/10
Polygon	7/10

NBA Live 18 received "average" reviews from critics, according to review aggregator Metacritic.

Many critics noted the game as an improvement over its predecessors, but wrote the gameplay still had room for improvement. In a positive review of the game, Chris Roling of Bleacher Report wrote: "Here, casual means good fun. It feels as accessible as a basketball game should and is a step or two ahead of what many fans might have anticipated for a game following up on an outright cancellation." EGMNow gave the game 7.5/10, writing: "NBA Live 18 has improved in almost every way over its predecessor, making a strong case for its continued existence. However, a lackluster franchise and a sense of been-there-done-that with that other basketball series puts Live 18 one step behind the competition."

IGN gave the game 6.5/10, saying: "NBA Live 18's simplistic and fluid mechanics make for an approachable game of NBA, or WNBA, basketball. But for all that it does well on the court, elsewhere it fails to live up to its potential. There are plenty of side modes, but few have the depth or interesting new ideas to be worth getting invested in." GameSpot said "Between the WNBA matches and the position variety of The One, NBA Live 18 succeeds–albeit barely–as a viable alternative to NBA 2K18."

Game Informer said "NBA Live 18 still doesn't match or best NBA 2K18's deep feature set, but this year does show progress. The stable online matches, interesting career mode concept, and adequate if arcadey gameplay all point to a more promising future for EA's most struggling sports franchise." It later gave the game the award for "Most Improved Game" in its 2017 "Sports Game of the Year" Awards.
