= NBA 2K14 =

2013 basketball video game

- Cover art featuring LeBron James
- Developer: Visual Concepts
- Publisher: 2K
- Series: NBA 2K
- Platforms: Android iOS; Windows; PlayStation 3 PlayStation 4 Xbox 360; Xbox One
- Release: NA: October 1, 2013; AU: October 3, 2013; EU: October 4, 2013; PlayStation 4: NA: November 15, 2013; PAL: November 29, 2013; Xbox One: WW: November 22, 2013
- Genre: Sports
- Modes: Single-player, multiplayer

NBA 2K14 is a 2013 basketball video game developed by Visual Concepts and published by 2K. The fifteenth installment in the series, it was released on October 1, 2013, for Windows, PlayStation 3, and Xbox 360, and the PlayStation 4 and the Xbox One versions were released on the consoles' respective launch dates. LeBron James of the Miami Heat became the cover athlete, and also served as the music curator for the game. 2K Sports also released the DLC pack that as a bonus for pre-ordering the game, they would receive 10,000 VC, bonus content for "Path to Greatness" mode, adding James in the Blacktop mode and a signature skill for MyCareer mode. On August 14, 2013, 2K Sports announced that Crew Mode would return to this year's installment of NBA 2K. NBA 2K14 is the successor to NBA 2K13 and was succeeded by NBA 2K15 in the NBA 2K series.

This is the last game in the series for the PC version where players can customize button configurations to suit their gameplay style.

== Development ==
On July 2, 2013, 2K Sports and EuroLeague signed an exclusive multi-year deal to include teams in the game. This marks the first time EuroLeague teams have appeared in the NBA 2K series, similar to EA's NBA Live series, which included FIBA teams and also the U.S. national basketball team found in 2K13, beginning with Live 08 and ending with Live 10.

== Reception ==
Reception

Aggregate score
Aggregator	Score
Metacritic	(PS3) 84/100 (X360) 87/100 (PS4) 85/100 (XONE) 86/100 (iOS) 59/100

Review scores
Publication	Score
Game Informer	8.5/10
GameRevolution	8/10
GameSpot	8/10
GamesRadar+	4/5
Giant Bomb	4/5
IGN	9.3/10
Push Square	8/10
TouchArcade	(iOS) 3/5

NBA 2K14 received "generally favorable" reviews from critics, according to review aggregator Metacritic.

Ryan McCaffrey of IGN rated the game a score of 9.3 out of 10, praising the gameplay saying, "With just enough new features, and tighter-than-ever gameplay, NBA 2K14 tops its predecessors and competitors... again". Tom McShea of GameSpot rated the game a score of 8.0 out of 10, praising the game as well but criticizing designing of the game. USA Today's Brett Molina rated the game 3.5 out of 4 stars, noting that the game's new dribble and shoot mechanics may be simpler to newcomers, but frustrating to veteran gamers. Matt Bertz of Game Informer stated that the presentation was "the best the sports genre has to offer", but criticized the lack of improvements made to both the My Career and Association modes. Andy Hartup of GamesRadar+ praised the amazingly realistic player models, My Career mode, and improved presentation while criticizing recycled content and the uncanny valley nature of the player models. Greg Giddens of Push Square concluded that "NBA 2K14 on the PS4 is a stunning digital facsimile of basketball. The title's visually jaw dropping, technically stunning, and represents a whole different ball game to its PS3 counterpart. The new My Career and My GM campaigns don't always score a slam dunk, but they're engaging enough to dribble your way through, making this is a top option..."

Shortly after release, the game was the best-selling sports game on 8th-consoles.

During the 17th Annual D.I.C.E. Awards, the Academy of Interactive Arts & Sciences nominated NBA 2K14 for "Sports Game of the Year".

== Additions and changes ==
As well as the aforementioned new soundtrack and inclusion of EuroLeague teams (at the expense of the "Celeb" team, "Team USA", "Dream Team" and 2001–2002 Sacramento Kings classic squad), several new changes have been made since 2K13:

- "LeBron: Path to Greatness" mode, which is not found on the PlayStation 4 and Xbox One versions of the game, is reminiscent of an expanded version of NBA 2K11's Jordan Challenge, where players get to control LeBron James' career in an alternate future of the NBA from the 2013–14 to the 2019–20 season (either as a member of the Miami Heat for the entire time, or a more complex route where LeBron plays for the Heat, before later leaving to join the New York Knicks, only for him to leave again to return to the Cleveland Cavaliers, before making one last return to the Heat.) as they attempt to win 7 NBA championships (while it is actually five championships as Lebron James had already won two in real life by the time of the beginning of the game mode). Lebron James' future is laid out by the game meaning players' choices are somewhat predetermined.
- New signature skills, including an exclusive pre-order "LeBron Coast to Coast" skill (Speed, Quickness and Ball-Handling attributes are boosted 4 points and the shot penalty enforced for hitting a defender is decreased), One Man Fastbreak (a speed and handling increase on a fastbreak), Pick Dodger (player doesn't get caught on screens), Tenacious Rebounder (increase in rebounding skill), Flashy Passer (less likelihood of a "flashy pass" going astray - see below), Screen Outlet/Pick & Roll Maestro (skills which give boosts in pick and roll situations). a new way of passing by holding a trigger and pressing a control stick in the direction the player want to pass (includes blind passes).
- The "potential" stat now limited and restricted the overall level a player can grow to, rather than increasing as the player improves as happened in previous NBA 2K titles. It curbed the amount by which players' attributes could improve in Association Mode (fixing the flaw of too many players turning into superstars in future seasons).
- More than 50 hours of new commentary from Kevin Harlan, Clark Kellogg, and Steve Kerr, new draft night audio and new "MyCareer" voiceovers.
- A new "Training Camp" mode, which is there to guide players to master the new controls.
- Training Drills now have their own menu in My Career mode, meaning players don't have to return to the main menu (and back again) to do multiple training sessions.
- Always Online DRM added in patch requiring users to be connected to 2K servers to play MyCareer and MyGM modes. However, the patch is only available on the PS4 and the Xbox One versions of the game and not on the PS3, Xbox 360 and PC versions of the game.
