= NBA Live 15 =

2014 basketball video game

- Cover featuring Damian Lillard
- Developer: EA Tiburon
- Publisher: EA Sports
- Series: NBA Live
- Platforms: PlayStation 4 Xbox One
- Release: NA: October 28, 2014; WW: October 31, 2014
- Genre: Sports
- Modes: Single-player, multiplayer

NBA Live 15 is a basketball simulation video game for the PlayStation 4 and Xbox One released on October 28, 2014, in North America and on October 31, 2014, in Europe. It features Damian Lillard of the Portland Trail Blazers as its cover athlete. The release date was moved due to EA Sports wanting to polish the title before release. This is the second installment of the game after taking a four-year hiatus starting in 2010.

NBA Live 15 was followed by NBA Live 16.

== Development ==
EA Sports introduced gameplay with 8-player 3D-scans. Changes include graphical improvements for jerseys, arenas, shot clocks, the basket, and more. On-court mechanics and animations are refined in such that its producers touted as a "realistic simulation". EA Sports scanned 70% of NBA players.

== Reception ==
Reception

Aggregate score
Aggregator	Score
Metacritic	(PS4) 59/100 (XONE) 53/100

Review scores
Publication	Score
Electronic Gaming Monthly	4.5/10
GameRevolution	3.5/5
GameSpot	5/10
GamesRadar+	3.5/5
GameTrailers	5.7/10
IGN	5.5/10

NBA Live 15 received mixed reviews, according to review aggregator Metacritic, though most critics noted it as an improvement over its predessecor. IGN gave it a 5.5/10, writing: "Although NBA Live 15 looks significantly better than NBA Live 14 at a glance, it still suffers from clumsy controls and stiff animations. A few nice changes and additional game modes can't make up for poor gameplay, but there are some great ideas here that just don't get a chance to shine." GameTrailers gave it a 5.7/10, saying: "While it's a big improvement over last year and a clear step in the right direction, NBA Live 15 forgets that basketball is a team sport. Dunks are overpowered, rendering ball movement and teamwork pointless. Hopefully further refinement can produce a great basketball game in the future, but for 2015, NBA Live's advances are still overshadowed by flawed fundamentals."

Electronic Gaming Monthly gave it a 4.5/10, saying: "NBA Live has had a tough time escaping the shadow of NBA 2K—and that trend continues with NBA Live 15, which doesn't deliver believable player movement, shooting, or gameplay flow. The 'Big Moments' mode shows the potential that the series might be able to execute in the coming years, but right now, it's like a .500 team trying to compete with a playoff juggernaut."
