= NBA Live =

Basketball video game series

- NBA Live video game series logo
- Genre: Sports
- Developers: EA Canada (1994–2010); EA Tiburon (2013–2018)
- Publisher: EA Sports
- Platforms: Game Boy; GameCube; Nintendo 64; Microsoft Windows (PC); PlayStation; PlayStation 2 PlayStation 3 PlayStation 4 PlayStation Portable; Sega Genesis; Sega Saturn; Super NES; Wii; Xbox; Xbox 360; Xbox One
- First release: NBA Live 95; October 1994
- Latest release: NBA Live 19; September 7, 2018

NBA Live was a series of basketball video games that was published by EA Sports. The series, which debuted in 1994, is the successor to the previous NBA Playoffs and NBA Showdown series.

Beginning in the late 2000s, NBA Live sales had dropped off compared to its main competitor, 2K's NBA 2K series. The last released installment to date is 2018's NBA Live 19. As of 2026, the series has been in an indefinite hiatus, and after the cancellations of NBA Live 20 and NBA Live 21, there has not been any official confirmation by EA on whether or not the series will continue.

== NBA Playoffs ==
The predecessor of the NBA Live series was the NBA Playoffs series, which featured Lakers vs. Celtics, released first in 1989 for MS-DOS-compatible PCs and later adapted for consoles in 1990 for the Sega Mega Drive. This game was played from a horizontal view (while later versions moved to an isometric view before ultimately moving to 3D on newer consoles). The game was one of the first to feature an NBA license, containing both real NBA teams and player likenesses and signature moves. Details such as Horace Grant's goggles are clearly visible, and Michael Jordan's "Air Reverse Layup" is animated with very high accuracy. Player numbers were also visible. The game featured only eight of the sixteen teams that qualified for the NBA playoffs that year, as well as both NBA All-Star teams.

The next game in the series was Bulls vs. Lakers, released in 1992, followed by Bulls vs. Blazers in the same year. Unlike the first game, these two releases were titled after the two teams who were in the NBA Finals the previous season, while the original release apparently chose the Lakers and Celtics due to both teams' historical success, in particular their rivalry in the 1980s. Each revision added more teams and players, as well as more signature moves. The series also included an Olympic basketball spinoff game, Team USA Basketball (1992) which uses the same engine. The final game in the series was NBA Showdown 94 for the Sega Genesis before the transition to the NBA Live naming.

Year	Game title	Features
1989	Lakers versus Celtics and the NBA Playoffs	NBA teams and players, signature moves in team game.
1992	Bulls vs Lakers and the NBA Playoffs	Co-operative play, instant replay in team game.
1992	Team USA Basketball	International player licenses.
1992	Bulls vs. Blazers and the NBA Playoffs	NBA teams and players, custom team.
1993	NBA Showdown	Multiple custom team, 3rd party in game advertisement, all NBA teams.

== History ==
In the fall of 1994, the annual EA basketball release received a simpler title of NBA Live 95. This naming pattern using the forthcoming year has continued, except for varying to use of all 4 digits of the year from 2000 to 2005. Each version's initial release was in the fall near the start of the NBA campaign, though additional ports were sometimes delayed until as late as January or February. After 16 consecutive seasons of releases, an effort to retool the game as NBA Elite 11 met with development troubles, and put the game on hiatus for three years. The series returned with NBA Live 14 in November 2013.

The pioneer NBA Live 95 release was for fourth generation video game systems Sega Genesis and SNES, as well as the MS-DOS operating system. NBA Live 96 included the first fifth generation version, with the PlayStation, and also the first handheld games version, on the Game Boy. Sixth generation production started with NBA Live 2001 and continued all the way through NBA Live 2009 on the high selling PlayStation 2. NBA Live 06 was the first to hit seventh generation consoles, after its release to the Xbox 360. Finally, with the release of NBA Live 14 for the Xbox One and PlayStation 4, EA continued its run on into eighth generation consoles. The game was released on PC each season until support was pulled after the NBA Live 08 season.

The Create-A-Player feature was not available in the 1995 versions of the game, but has been a mainstay since NBA Live 96.

NBA Live 99 was the first to feature Practice Mode and Multi-season play.

Starting in NBA Live 2000, the series featured NBA Live Legend All-Stars Teams, that included some biggest names from five decades (50s to 90s). These teams could be used instantly, but to use the players as regular players (e.g. traded, played on regular NBA Teams) they needed to be unlocked. Through the series, some of the Legend rosters were changed for various reasons. Michael Jordan was on the '90s team through 2004 before being removed due to licensing in later versions. Spud Webb, Kareem Abdul-Jabbar, and Tom Chambers were added to the rosters in NBA Live 06.

NBA Live 2005 brought the addition of the Freestyle Air, NBA All-Star Weekend, which includes the Rookie Challenge, Three Point Shootout, Slam Dunk Contest, and the NBA All-Star Game, and Freestyle Challenge, which two players or more can play the Three Point Shootout or the Slam Dunk Contest.

In NBA Live 08, a limited number of international teams were added under FIBA's license. This was also the last release for the Microsoft Windows platform.

NBA Live 09 added a feature called Dynamic DNA, the first concept of daily updates changing tendencies, rosters, and hot-cold streaks.

After the release of NBA Live 10, EA attempted to retool the series under a new name with NBA Elite 11. However, the game was met with bad publicity and development problems before release and was cancelled (though a playable demo was released for download, and several copies of the full release found their way to customers). In November 2010, development of the franchise was moved from EA Canada studio to Florida-based Tiburon studio. It was eventually announced that the series' next installment would be released in Fall 2012 and would return to the NBA Live name as NBA Live 13, but it would later be announced, on September 27, 2012, that they would cancel the release. It wasn't until the fall of 2013, that the next game, NBA Live 14, would be released. Prior to its release, EA Sports had sold 33.54 million copies of the video game series since NBA Live 95, just falling short of its main competitor, NBA 2K's 37.24 million copies sold since its inception in 1999.

NBA Live 16 was released on September 29, 2015. NBA Live Mobile was released on July 6, 2016. It is mostly used to play Ultimate Team modes in the game. NBA Live 18 was released on September 15, 2017, and features players from the WNBA. It also added a new single player mode called The One, in which the player controls an NBA prospect throughout his career. NBA Live 19 was released on September 7, 2018, and expanded on The One, by adding the ability to make a female player, as well as other game modes. NBA Live 20 was canceled by the development team due to them trying to expand into the next generation of consoles, as announced on the team's Twitter. NBA Live 21 was also cancelled for the same reason. An NBA Live title has since still not been released since, though it is unclear if the series has been officially discontinued as there has not been any official confirmation by EA on the subject matter.

== Games ==
Game title	Release date	Platforms	Cover
NBA Live 95	December 16, 1994	Super NES, Genesis, DOS	Seven player action shot from 1994 NBA Finals, Knicks vs. Rockets
NBA Live 96	December 31, 1995	Super NES, Genesis, DOS, PlayStation, Game Boy	Tip-off before Game 1 of the 1995 NBA Finals, Rockets vs. Magic (SNES and Genesis) (United States) Shaquille O'Neal (PC and PlayStation)
NBA Live 97	October 31, 1996	Super NES, Genesis, DOS, PlayStation, Saturn	(United States) Mitch Richmond
NBA Live 98	June 17, 1997	Super NES, Genesis, Windows, PlayStation, Saturn	(United States) Tim Hardaway
NBA Live 99	October 31, 1998	Windows, PlayStation, Nintendo 64	(United States) Antoine Walker
NBA Live 2000	October 31, 1999	Windows, PlayStation, Nintendo 64	(United States) Tim Duncan
NBA Live 2001	October 16, 2000	Windows, PlayStation 2, PlayStation	(United States) Kevin Garnett (Lithuania) Arvydas Sabonis
NBA Live 2002	October 29, 2001	PlayStation 2, PlayStation, Xbox	(United States) Steve Francis (United States) Michael Jordan
NBA Live 2003	October 8, 2002	PlayStation 2, PlayStation, Xbox, GameCube, Windows	(United States) Jason Kidd
NBA Live 2004	October 14, 2003	PlayStation 2, Xbox, GameCube, Windows	(United States) Vince Carter (Spain) Raül López (France) Tony Parker
NBA Live 2005	September 28, 2004	PlayStation 2, Xbox, GameCube, Windows	(United States) Carmelo Anthony (France) Tony Parker (Spain) Pau Gasol
NBA Live 06	September 26, 2005	PlayStation 2, Xbox, GameCube, Windows, PlayStation Portable, Mobile, Xbox 360	(United States) Dwyane Wade (Japan) Yuta Tabuse (France) Tony Parker (Spain) Pau Gasol
NBA Live 07	September 25, 2006	PlayStation 2, Xbox, Windows, PlayStation Portable, Mobile, Xbox 360	(United States) Tracy McGrady (Germany) Dirk Nowitzki (France) Tony Parker (France) Boris Diaw (Spain) Pau Gasol
NBA Live 08	October 1, 2007	PlayStation 3, PlayStation 2, PlayStation Portable, Xbox 360, Wii, Windows	(United States) Gilbert Arenas (Germany) Dirk Nowitzki (Italy) Andrea Bargnani (Spain) Pau Gasol (France) Tony Parker (France) Boris Diaw
NBA Live 09	October 7, 2008	PlayStation 3, PlayStation 2, PlayStation Portable, Xbox 360, Wii, Mobile	(France) Tony Parker (United Kingdom) Luol Deng (Italy) Andrea Bargnani (Spain) Pau Gasol
NBA Live 10	October 6, 2009	PlayStation 3, PlayStation Portable, Xbox 360, iOS	(United States) Dwight Howard (Spain) Pau Gasol (United Kingdom) Luol Deng (France) Tony Parker
NBA Elite 11	November 5, 2010	iOS, PS3	(United States) Kevin Durant
NBA Live 13	Cancelled in 2012		
NBA Live 14	November 19, 2013	PlayStation 4, Xbox One	(United States) Kyrie Irving
NBA Live 15	October 28, 2014	PlayStation 4, Xbox One	(United States) Damian Lillard
NBA Live 16	September 29, 2015	PlayStation 4, Xbox One	(United States) Russell Westbrook
NBA Live Mobile	July 6, 2016	Android, iOS	(United States) Russell Westbrook (United States) James Harden (United States) Allen Iverson (Cameroon) Joel Embiid (Slovenia) Luka Dončić (Greece) Giannis Antetokounmpo
NBA Live 18	September 15, 2017	PlayStation 4, Xbox One	(United States) James Harden
NBA Live 19	September 7, 2018	PlayStation 4, Xbox One	(Cameroon) Joel Embiid
NBA Live 20	Cancelled in 2019		

== NBA Live commentary ==
Games	Commentary team
NBA Live 98	Verne Lundquist
NBA Live 99	Don Poier
NBA Live 2000	Don Poier, Reggie Theus
NBA Live 2001	Don Poier, Bob Elliott
NBA Live 2002	Don Poier, Bob Elliott
NBA Live 2003	Don Poier, Bob Elliott
NBA Live 2004	Marv Albert, Mike Fratello
NBA Live 2005	Marv Albert, Mike Fratello
NBA Live 06	Marv Albert, Steve Kerr
NBA Live 07	Marv Albert, Steve Kerr
NBA Live 08	Marv Albert, Steve Kerr
NBA Live 09	Marv Albert, Steve Kerr
NBA Live 10	Marv Albert, Steve Kerr
NBA Live 14	Mike Breen, Jeff Van Gundy
NBA Live 15	Mike Breen, Jeff Van Gundy
NBA Live 16	Mike Breen, Jeff Van Gundy
NBA Live 18	Mike Breen, Jeff Van Gundy
NBA Live 19	Ed Cohen, Jay Williams

== See also ==
- NCAA Basketball series
- NBA 2K
