= Bob Elliott (basketball) =

American basketball player (born 1955)

Personal information
- Born: August 18, 1955 (age 71) Ann Arbor, Michigan, U.S.
- Listed height: 6 ft 9 in (2.06 m)
- Listed weight: 225 lb (102 kg)

Career information
- High school: Pioneer (Ann Arbor, Michigan)
- College: Arizona (1973–1977)
- NBA draft: 1977: 2nd round, 42nd overall pick
- Drafted by: Philadelphia 76ers
- Playing career: 1977–1983
- Position: Center / power forward
- Number: 55

Career history
- 1977–1978: Fernet Tonic Bologna
- 1978–1982: New Jersey Nets
- 1982–1983: Detroit Spirits

Career highlights
- CBA champion (1983); 3× First-team All-WAC (1975–1977)
- Stats at NBA.com
- Stats at Basketball Reference

Robert Alan Elliott (born August 18, 1955) is an American former basketball player. Elliott was a three-time academic and athletic All-American at the University of Arizona, leading his team to a Western Athletic Conference championship and two NCAA tournament appearances. He was a 1977 Third Team All American, a 1975, 1976 and 1977 Third Team All-WAC conference honoree, and a 1975, 1976, and 1977 Academic All American. Elliott received a bachelor of science in accounting, and later, an MBA from the University of Arizona as well. He is a past chairman of the Retired NBA Players Association.

== University of Arizona ==
Elliott came to the University of Arizona from Pioneer High School in Ann Arbor, Michigan. Many Arizona basketball advocates credit the young Elliott for introducing modern Arizona basketball to the nation under the coaching style of Fred "The Fox" Snowden (the first black head basketball coach in D1 collegiate basketball). At a time when UCLA was the west coast powerhouse athletic program, Tucson worked to move from being a small "Old Pueblo" town with a great university to the U of A metropolis that it is today. Sold-out games and revenue from the Snowden Era put basketball in the spotlight. Elliott was described as having "one of the best drop steps you will ever see." He had an 18.6 career scoring average while in college between 1973–1977. He is still second, behind Sean Elliott, on the University of Arizona's all time records list with 2,131 points, field goals (808), attempted field goals (1,512), free throws (515), and attempted free throws (767). He scored 39 points against Utah in 1977, which is noted as the fourth best all-time single game performance at U of A.

== NBA career ==
Elliott was drafted by the Philadelphia 76ers of the NBA, but never played for them. He spent half a year playing basketball in Europe and three seasons with the New Jersey Nets. Following his NBA career, Elliott briefly played for the Detroit Spirits of the Continental Basketball Association during the 1982–83 season. He won the CBA championship with the Spirits in 1983.

== EA Sports ==
Elliott may be best known in younger generations for his voice work as a color-commentator on NBA Live games with late sportscaster (and former Memphis Grizzlies announcer) Don Poier from 1999 to 2003.

== Community involvement ==
Elliott is involved with multiple charities and has established a scholarship in the names of him and his wife through the University of Arizona. He is an avid musician and plays at national events with the NBA Retired Players Association Band, which is closely linked with NBA Cares events. His wife is an involved and accredited member of the Tucson Unified School District and Behind The Bench (Retired Players Wives Association), has national counseling awards and multiple degrees, and also stays active in community groups and community relations groups.

== Author of "Tucson A Basketball Town" ==
Released on February 26, 2014, this book is the story of the foundations of basketball at The University of Arizona during the Fred Snowden era. Co-written by Elliott's teammate and former NBA player Eric Money, it discusses the rise of basketball's popularity, being the first team to play in McKale center, the racial barriers that were broken, and the undying support of Tucson for the players. The book also pays homage to the Arizona basketball teams of the pre-Snowden era, through Lute Olson, and into Sean Miller.c.

== Personal life ==
Elliott resides in Tucson, Arizona. He and his wife Beverely have four adult children and ten grandchildren. Elliott also owns a successful accounting practice, Elliott Accounting Group, in Tucson that has been active for over 30 years.

== Career statistics ==
Legend
GP	Games played	GS	Games started	MPG	Minutes per game
FG%	Field goal percentage	3P%	3-point field goal percentage	FT%	Free throw percentage
RPG	Rebounds per game	APG	Assists per game	SPG	Steals per game
BPG	Blocks per game	PPG	Points per game	**Bold**	Career high

=== NBA ===
==== Regular season ====
Year	Team	GP	MPG	FG%	3P%	FT%	RPG	APG	SPG	BPG	PPG
1978–79	New Jersey	14	**20.1**	**.562**		**.732**	**4.0**	1.6	.4	**.3**	**8.8**
1979–80	New Jersey	54	13.4	.443	.250	.684	3.4	1.0	**.5**	**.3**	5.7
1980–81	New Jersey	**73**	18.1	.511	**.500**	.599	3.6	**1.8**	**.5**	.2	7.5
Career		141	16.5	.494	.333	.649	3.6	1.4	.5	.2	7.0

== See also ==
- List of NCAA Division I men's basketball players with 2000 points and 1000 rebounds
