= Lakers versus Celtics and the NBA Playoffs =

1989 video game

- North American Genesis box art
- Developer: Electronic Arts
- Publisher: Electronic Arts
- Composer: Rob Hubbard
- Series: NBA Playoffs
- Platforms: MS-DOS, Sega Genesis/Mega Drive
- Release: MS-DOS: NA: 1989; Genesis/Mega Drive: NA: December 1990; PAL: 1991
- Genre: Sports (basketball)
- Modes: Single-player, Multiplayer

Lakers versus Celtics and the NBA Playoffs is a basketball video game developed and released by Electronic Arts. It was first released in 1989 for MS-DOS-compatible PCs and for the Sega Genesis in 1990. The game was highly successful; it was the first game endorsed by the NBA and was the first to contain multiple NBA stars and teams in one game. The game's title alludes to the 1980s rivalry between the Boston Celtics and Los Angeles Lakers. It is the first game in the NBA Playoffs series of games.

The game would be the first team basketball video game to acquire full players names and rights without actually relying on the NBA Players Association. Established stars in the game include Larry Bird, Kareem Abdul-Jabbar (DOS version only), Magic Johnson, Michael Jordan, and Patrick Ewing.

The game introduced innovations in presentation. It was the first NBA game to feature TV style starting line up prior to the opening tip. It also featured halftime shows and announcers to simulate an authentic feel. Later games would go further by replacing music during gameplay with audience cheers. The game was conceived by Producer Don Traeger, and principal work done by programmer Robert Weatherby and art director Michael Kosaka. It was the first game to feature the EASN logo, a standalone sports brand that Traeger had conceived with marketing partner Don Transeth and artist Michael Kosaka. This brand later evolved into EA Sports.

== Gameplay ==
The game can be played in various ways: players could play against each other, or against the computer. Games against the computer were divided into two modes, "Exhibition" or "Playoffs". There are also four difficulty levels: Pre-season, Regular season, Playoffs and Showtime. Games could be configured for 2, 5, 8 or 12 minute quarters.

Signature moves for individual star players who have their own were introduced, such as Charles Barkley's gorilla dunk.

=== Teams ===
Players can pick from one of eight teams who were among the 16 that had competed in the playoffs the year before the game was released. The MS-DOS version contained teams from the 1989 NBA Playoffs, while the Genesis version contained the playoff teams from the 1990 NBA Playoffs.

MS-DOS version:

East	West
Boston Celtics	Los Angeles Lakers
Chicago Bulls	Phoenix Suns
Detroit Pistons	Seattle SuperSonics
New York Knicks	Utah Jazz

Genesis version:

East	West
Boston Celtics	Los Angeles Lakers
Chicago Bulls	Phoenix Suns
Detroit Pistons	Portland Trail Blazers
Philadelphia 76ers	San Antonio Spurs

Both conferences' All-Star Teams were available as well. This was the only way to use players from teams that were not represented in the game - Hakeem Olajuwon, Dominique Wilkins, Chris Mullin and Reggie Miller being examples.

== Reception ==
Computer Gaming World praised Lakers versus Celtics' graphics, but stated that it was too easy to play for action gamers and that scoring was too high for statistics-oriented players, and unfavorably noted the lack of league play or custom lineups. The game scored 88% in Computer and Video Games. Mega placed the game at #24 in their Top Mega Drive Games of All Time.
