= NBA Live 07 =

2006 basketball video game

- Xbox 360 cover art featuring Tracy McGrady
- Developer: EA Canada
- Publisher: EA Sports
- Series: NBA Live
- Platforms: PlayStation 2 PlayStation Portable; Xbox 360; Xbox; Windows
- Release: NA: September 25, 2006; AU: October 5, 2006 (PC); EU: October 6, 2006; AU: October 12, 2006; AU: October 19, 2006 (X360); EU: October 20, 2006 (X360); KOR: November 8, 2006 (PSP); NA: November 15, 2006 (Mobile); JP: November 22, 2006 (PS2, X360); JP: December 21, 2006 (PSP)
- Genre: Sports
- Modes: Single-player, Multiplayer

NBA Live 07 is the 2006 installment of the NBA Live series by EA Sports. It was released on Xbox, Xbox 360, PlayStation 2, PlayStation Portable, and Windows.

== Cover ==
NBA Live 07 features Tracy McGrady of the Houston Rockets as the cover athlete in most versions, but some international versions have players from those areas:

- Spain: Pau Gasol
- Germany: Dirk Nowitzki
- France: Tony Parker & Boris Diaw

== Features ==
Players can create and name players which can be added to the roster. Players can also be upgraded to 99 using a special feature. Although the player can be named in any way, the commentator can speak out their last name if given certain names. Game modes include Dynasty, Season, Playoffs, NBA All Star Weekend, 1-on-1, Individual Practice and Slam Dunk Practice.

Teams can be unlocked by progressing through the game and completing unique challenges. The game features stars like Magic Johnson, Larry Bird, George Mikan, Wilt Chamberlain, and many others. They are all on one of the All-Star teams, which include the 50s All-Stars, 60s All-Stars, 70s All-Stars, 80s All-Stars, and 90s All-Stars. The Legend Teams are not available for the Xbox 360.

The game features the voices of Marv Albert and basketball player Steve Kerr. This was the last NBA Live game to be released on the original Xbox. A PlayStation 3 version was cancelled because the design was progressed ambitiously.

== Reception ==
Reception

Aggregate score
Aggregator	Score					
Aggregator	mobile	PC	PS2	PSP	Xbox	Xbox 360
Metacritic	N/A	61/100	63/100	64/100	69/100	59/100

Review scores
Publication	Score					
Publication	mobile	PC	PS2	PSP	Xbox	Xbox 360
Electronic Gaming Monthly	N/A	N/A	N/A	N/A	N/A	4/10
Eurogamer	N/A	N/A	N/A	N/A	N/A	5/10
Famitsu	N/A	N/A	28/40	29/40	N/A	32/40
Game Informer	N/A	N/A	7.5/10	N/A	7.5/10	5.25/10
GamePro	N/A	N/A	N/A	N/A	N/A	4/5
GameRevolution	N/A	N/A	N/A	N/A	N/A	D+
GameSpot	N/A	5.9/10	7.1/10	6.8/10	7.3/10	6.5/10
GameSpy	N/A	N/A	N/A	4/5	N/A	N/A
GameTrailers	N/A	N/A	N/A	N/A	N/A	4.5/10
GameZone	N/A	N/A	6.7/10	6.6/10	7/10	N/A
IGN	7.5/10	4.9/10	4.9/10	6/10	4.9/10	6/10
Official U.S. PlayStation Magazine	N/A	N/A	5/10	N/A	N/A	N/A
Official Xbox Magazine (US)	N/A	N/A	N/A	N/A	7.5/10	7/10
PC Gamer (US)	N/A	55%	N/A	N/A	N/A	N/A
Detroit Free Press	N/A	N/A	N/A	N/A	N/A	1/4

NBA Live 07 received "mixed or average reviews" on all platforms according to video game review aggregator Metacritic. This marks the first time an NBA Live game has been rated in this majority. In Japan, Famitsu gave the game a score of all four sevens for the PlayStation 2 version; all four eights for the Xbox 360 version; and one seven, one eight, and two sevens for the PSP version.

== See also ==
- NBA 2K7
