= NHL 17 =

2016 video game

- Cover art for most territories featuring Vladimir Tarasenko (Note: The cover art for the Swiss version features Nino Niederreiter.)
- Developer: EA Canada
- Publisher: EA Sports
- Series: NHL
- Engine: Ignite
- Platforms: PlayStation 4 Xbox One
- Release: NA: September 13, 2016; EU: September 15, 2016
- Genre: Sports (ice hockey)
- Modes: Single-player, multiplayer

NHL 17 is an ice hockey simulation video game developed by EA Canada and published by EA Sports. It is the 26th installment in the NHL game series and was released for the PlayStation 4 and Xbox One consoles in September 2016.

The development team focused solely on eighth generation console versions for NHL 17, citing an increased player base on those consoles over seventh generation ones. They utilized Electronic Arts' Ignite engine and built the game off of that, attempting to generally improve on the series' previous installment. They introduced gameplay improvements in terms of artificial intelligence and physics as well as new mode such as the World Cup of Hockey tournament mode and a revamped version of "Be a GM", a simulation mode where the player acts as a team's general manager, titled "Franchise Mode", which now features team owners and team relocation. A newer Creation Zone was also added, featuring an expansive team builder as well as an arena creator. Modes from its predecessor saw a return as well, including the trading card-based team building mode Hockey Ultimate Team (HUT), the online co-operative play mode known as EA Sports Hockey League, and Be a Pro, a career mode. Similar to the past two NHL titles, NHL 17 features presentation in the style of the NHL on NBC.

Prior to the game's release, there were several trailers were released to promote it. A public beta for the game was initiated prior to the game's release for testing. Critics who played the beta wrote generally positive reviews and noted it as a good precursor to the full game. Upon full release, NHL 17 received generally positive reviews from critics. The gameplay improvements and new additions to the game mainly received praise, while criticism was aimed at some lack of depth and general innovation. Online servers for the game were shut down on June 6, 2022.

== Gameplay ==
NHL 17 is an ice hockey simulation video game powered by the Ignite engine, created by Electronic Arts. It features game presentation in the style of the NHL on NBC, with commentary being provided by Mike Emrick (play-by-play), Eddie Olczyk (color) and Ray Ferraro (ice-side reporter), with the network's score bug appearing on-screen as well. The game can be played on five different difficulties; "Rookie", the lowest, "Semi-Pro", "Pro", "All-Star", and "Superstar", the highest. Players are able to select from three different control schemes, called "NHL '94 controls", "Skill Stick" and "Hybrid"; NHL '94 controls are very simplistic as they strictly use the controller's buttons for actions, aside from moving the player, which the left stick does; Skill Stick controls utilize the controller's right stick in order to both shoot and deke; Hybrid controls are similar to NHL '94 controls but have some more action options. All schemes have dedicated goalie controls, for when the player manually controls one, which are the same across all schemes. If they wish, the player can enable the On-Ice Trainer, a system made to assist the player as they play.

World Cup of Hockey gameplay in NHL 17. Visible is the NHL on NBC score bug (top-left) as well as the On-Ice Trainer (above center ice).

During a game, players maneuver around the ice with normal skating and deking and are able to seamlessly pass to teammates to create scoring chances. If a player scores a goal, they are able to celebrate the way they want to; many new celebrations were added to the game. One newly added celebration was a mimicked version of baseball player José Bautista's iconic bat flip that occurred during the 2015 American League Division Series. Defensively, the player can skate their way to the puck carrier and have a chance to break up the play. The player has multiple ways of doing so; pushing the carrier off of the puck, delivering a body check, or pushing them towards the boards of the ice.

Improvements were made to parts of the game's artificial intelligence and physics systems. A key improvement to the AI was the "Reactionary Save Intelligence" system made for goalies. This system has the goalie process the shooter's position and scoring angle before committing to a certain kind of save. The goalie will make either a technical or athletic save depending on the type of shot that they are facing; if the goalie has a good portion of the net covered already, they will block the puck with their body in their current position; if they are caught off guard, then they will resort to their athleticism and quick reflexes to make a save instead. EA also developed new motion capture for the goalies to match the movements of real-life goalies. In the area of player physics, battles between forwards and defenders in front of the net have been improved. These "net battles" were tuned to be more realistic; the player uses more stick play in these battles and can force tie-ups with the defender.

NHL 17 features several game modes including both new and returning ones. Play Now is an offline match that can be played solo or with a friend via local connection. Players can also play one-on-one matches with other NHL 17 users online in the Online Versus mode. Hockey Ultimate Team (HUT) has players create a custom team by opening packs containing trading cards to gain players and build a stronger team. Replacing the chemistry system of past NHL titles is the new Synergy system. Each player now has a special synergy, either a "Player Synergy" or "Team Synergy". These are activated when a certain number of players on a team have the same synergy. Player Synergies grant specific attribute boosts only to players while Team Synergies grant every player on the team attribute boosts. "Dynamic Sets" are also introduced to HUT. This is a crafting system in the mode that allows players to trade in items or players by putting them into a set and receiving a reward of higher value afterward. Newer and different sets were introduced over time. Be a Pro allows players to pursue a career in the National Hockey League with their own custom-made player. The EA Sports Hockey League (EASHL) allows players to create a custom player and join clubs formed by other NHL 17 users. Clubs can be custom-made, featuring custom names, logos, uniforms and arenas. The club's arena becomes larger and gets improved as the club progresses in the mode. EASHL can also be played outside of clubs in the Drop-In mode, where players can match up with other users and play a single 6-on-6 game together. This kind of game mode can also be played outside of EASHL with real-world teams in the Online Team Play mode. Other modes include Shootout Mode, where players can play a single round of shootout either offline or online, Practice Mode, where players can practice scenarios with a full team or practice as a goalie, Season Mode, where players assume control of a team in any hockey league and play a full season, and Playoff Mode, which is a one-off run of the Stanley Cup playoffs.

New modes were also introduced to the game. The Be a GM mode, which had the player become the general manager of any NHL team they choose, was expanded into the Franchise Mode. Team owners are introduced to the mode and players must now meet the team owner's expectations. The player can also potentially relocate their team to different city. If they relocate a team, they are free to build their own stadium and rebuild the team's image from the ground-up, similar to the team builder in EASHL. For the second time in the NHL series, the World Cup of Hockey is playable; NHL 2005 was the first NHL title to feature it. Players may play through the tournament with any team from the World Cup they choose. The actual players, jerseys and logos for each team all appear in-game. The Draft Champions mode is introduced to the series after a similar mode was featured in the Madden NFL series prior. A fantasy draft simulation, players are able to select NHL superstars in a 12-round draft and create their own team with them. After drafting, the player is then able to enter a tournament against the computer or other players online. The player also has a chance of reaching the Draft Championship during the tournament. Also added to NHL 17 is the ECHL, a North American hockey league. All 27 teams in the league are playable, with all team jerseys, logos and players appearing. The game also includes three Swiss league stadiums.

== Development and release ==
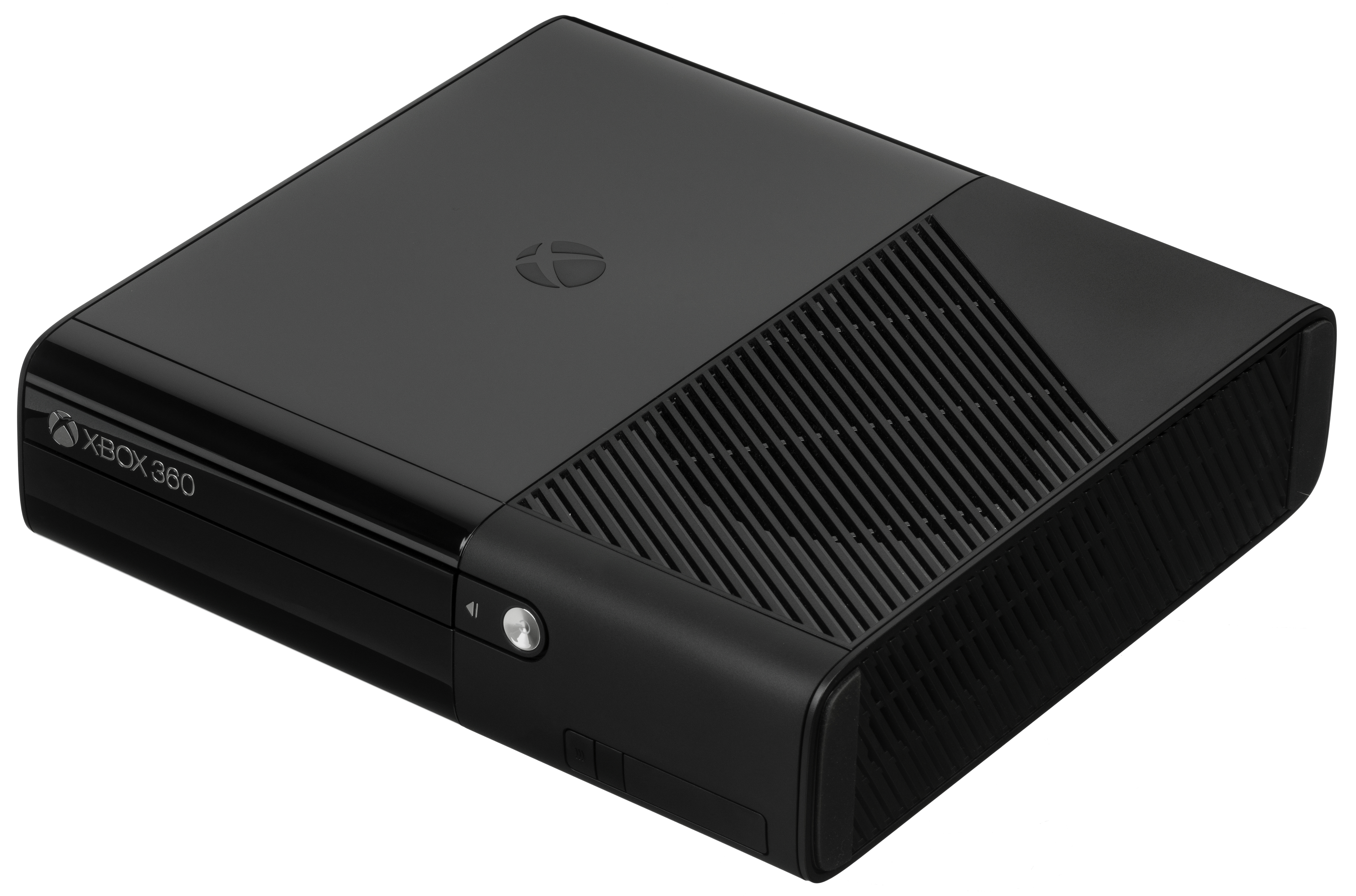
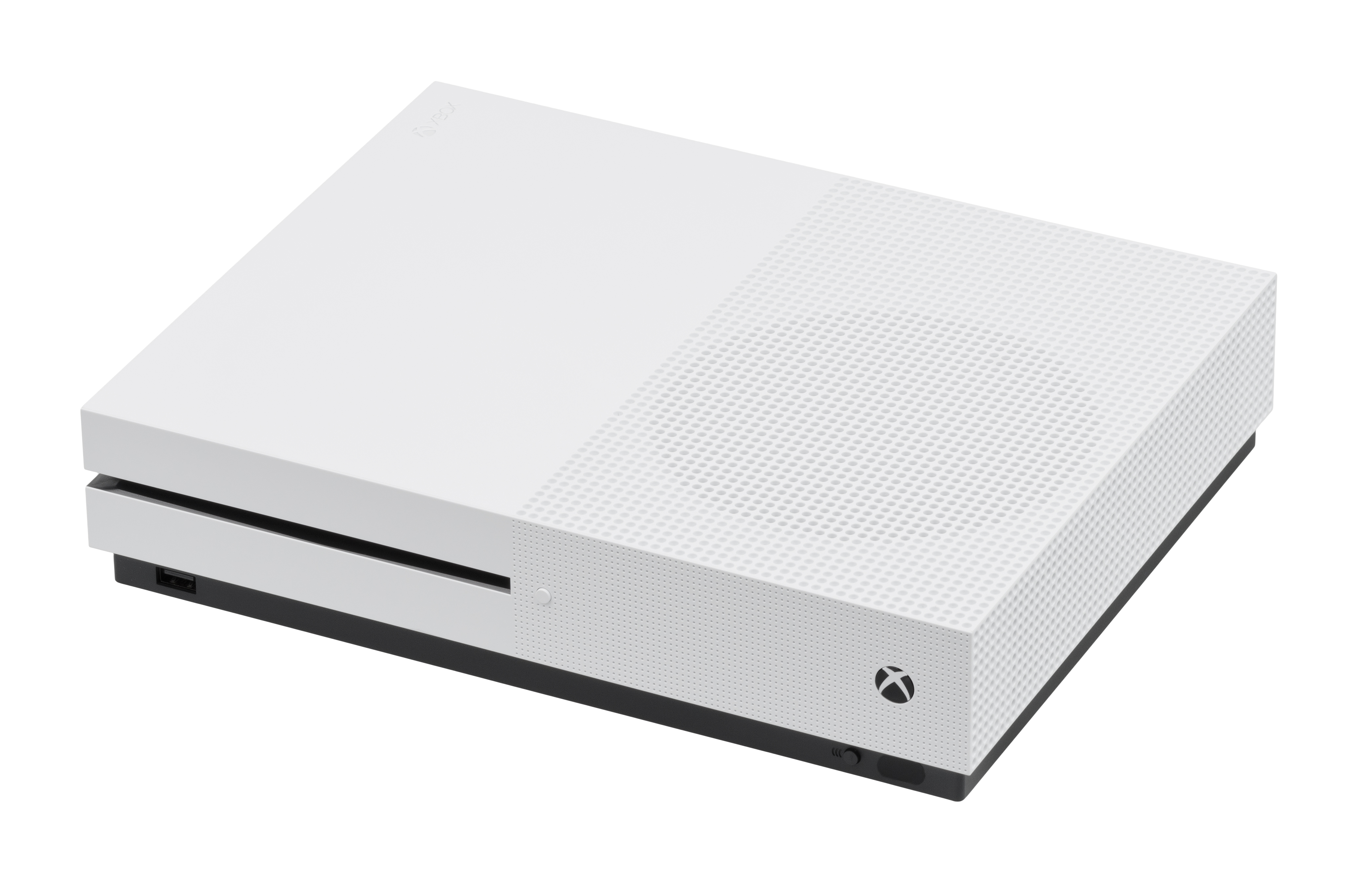
For NHL 17, EA Canada dropped support for seventh generation consoles, like the Xbox 360 (left; E model pictured), in order to have more development time for versions for eighth generation consoles, like the Xbox One (S model pictured), which had larger player bases.

According to NHL 17 lead producer Sean Ramjagsingh, the developers wanted to take from the series' previous installment and generally improve on it. The development team within EA Canada wanted to improve on the overall gameplay by introducing a better physics system and enhanced artificial intelligence. They utilized Electronic Arts' Ignite engine as a foundation to NHL 17 and built the game off of that. While the development team of FIFA within EA Canada had transitioned to the Frostbite engine from Ignite for that year's entry, the NHL development team continued to use Ignite, though Ramjagsingh speculated about possibly using Frostbite in future installments of the series. The game also dropped support for the older seventh generation of video game consoles for the first time, following the NHL: Legacy Edition port of the previous year. Ramjagsingh cited the increased player base on eighth generation consoles as a reason why the developers wanted to not port the game to the consoles of the previous generation.

The first trailer for NHL 17, dubbed the "Vision Trailer" was released on April 26, 2016. The video displayed the game's development and how the gameplay was built. In the video, the game's developers shared the vision that they had planned for the game during development, which included gameplay adjustments as well as customization improvements. On the same day, the voting for the game's cover athlete began. The vote featured 8 athletes, one from each country/team participating in the 2016 World Cup of Hockey. The final round of the voting was between Russian forward Vladimir Tarasenko, of the St. Louis Blues and American center Joe Pavelski, of the San Jose Sharks. Tarasenko won the vote, earning his spot on the game's cover art. Minnesota Wild forward Nino Niederreiter, a Swiss native, was named as the cover athlete for the Swiss version of the game.

A second trailer for the game, displaying cinematic gameplay, was released on June 22. A trailer was released on July 19 for the game's EASHL mode, displaying its improvements and new features. This was followed by a trailer displaying the new features in the HUT mode, released on July 26. The game's soundtrack was revealed on July 27; the EA Trax was unavailable in the previous two NHL titles. The soundtrack featured music from artists such as Nothing but Thieves, The Chainsmokers and The Sheepdogs among others. Similar to NHL 16, a public beta for the game was active from July 28 until August 4. Players who partook in the beta were able to access the EASHL, HUT and Online Versus modes as well as the game's team and arena creators (named the "Creation Zone"). A trailer exploring the new features in the Franchise Mode was released on August 9. On the following day, it was announced that EA Sports would be launching their NHL Rewards Program. People who registered in the program would be able to enter sweepstakes for a chance of winning hockey items. The game's World Cup of Hockey mode received a trailer that was first shown during the 2016 Gamescom convention on August 16.

NHL 17 was released for the PlayStation 4 and Xbox One consoles on September 13, 2016 in North America and September 15 in Europe. Pre-orders of any edition of the game came with a special EASHL equipment bundle as well as a unique goal celebration, imitating the one from NHL '94. The Deluxe and Super Deluxe editions came with extra gold packs for the Hockey Ultimate Team mode, delivered weekly for a certain amount of time, with the Super Deluxe edition offering more packs than the Deluxe. Pre-orders made through the Xbox Games Store came with a free month of EA Access. A large update for the game was released to coincide with its launch. The update brought in several new features, items and options, while also fixing certain issues and bugs.

The online servers for the game were shut down on June 6, 2022.

== Reception ==
=== Pre-release ===
The inclusion of the Bautista bat flip celebration, which could be viewed during the beta, received wide media coverage, with sites such as Yahoo! Sports, Fox Sports, CBS Sports, as well as the MLB's own Cut4 news subsidiary reporting on it. Critics who played the game's beta gave it generally positive reviews. Samit Sarkar of Polygon stated that "NHL 17 is shaping up to be the kind of game that could bring the series back to its previous-generation heights," complimenting the game's gameplay improvements and the new additions to the EASHL mode. Jake Sundstrom of SB Nation's Fear the Fin blog enjoyed the game's team and arena builders, but commented that they need "a little more depth". Brian Mazique of Forbes lauded the game's graphics, stating that "NHL continues to be one of the most attractive sports games available." He also praised the game's improved AI systems for CPU teammates and opponents as well as the online connectivity. He was more critical of the HUT mode's menus and the game's presentation, calling it "beyond stale and outdated." Mazique enjoyed the EASHL mode, but felt that the player creation feature was limited in options. SB Nation writer SkyonAir, of the Stanley Cup of Chowder blog, praised the player and team creators as well as the gameplay overhaul for goaltenders. While he criticized the beta's lack of game modes offered, he recommended the game to readers.

=== Post-release ===
Reception

Aggregate score
Aggregator	Score
Metacritic	78/100 (PS4); 77/100 (XONE)

Review scores
Publication	Score
Destructoid	8/10
Electronic Gaming Monthly	8.5/10
Game Informer	7.25/10
GameRevolution	4.5/5
GameSpot	7/10
Hardcore Gamer	3.5/5
IGN	8.4/10
PlayStation Official Magazine – UK	8/10
Polygon	7.5/10
Forbes	8.25/10

NHL 17 received mainly positive reviews from critics upon release. The PlayStation 4 version holds a 78/100 score on review aggregator site Metacritic, based on 26 reviews, while the Xbox One version holds a 77/100 score, based on 23 reviews. Critics mainly praised the new additions to the game, such as the Franchise Mode and team customization options as well as the improvements to gameplay. Criticism was aimed at some lack-of-depth, a lack of innovation and repetition in game presentation.

At Game Revolution, Devin Charles wrote a very positive review, awarding the game a 4.5/5 score. He felt that the game was very replayable, praising the amount of content that the game delivered as well as its online play. "The game's overall presentation is solid, with the commentary and action cutscenes always making you feel as if you are a part of the heated battles and help keep the game flowing and relevant," Charles stated in his review. His only criticism was the HUT mode and how little it was altered from the previous year.

IGN's Glenn Wigmore awarded the game an 8.4/10 score and stated that it "offers such variety that it's easy to recommend to many players." He noted the improved mechanics for goalies and stick battles between other players. He enjoyed the EASHL and Franchise Mode, saying that "NHL has needed this sort of management mode badly for a while now." He criticized the World Cup of Hockey mode for seeming too gimmicky and felt that it wouldn't receive much gameplay from players after one month.

Mat Paget of GameSpot wrote a less positive review, but gave the game a 7/10 score. Paget felt that the game presentation was repetitive and that the game was not too different from NHL 16, stating that "there isn't a standout mode or feature that makes this game substantially better than its predecessor." While he also aimed criticism at the Be a Pro mode, which he felt was barely touched, he complimented the adjusted user interface and felt that the HUT mode "remains an engaging experience."

At Game Informer, Matt Bertz gave the game a 7.25/10 score and wrote a mixed review. Bertz complimented the changes made to certain parts of the gameplay, saying that "shooting, passing and checking are all solid," although he felt that odd puck pickups and player pivots slowed down the game speed. He felt that EASHL was the game's standout mode that featured improvements with new customization options for players and teams, but also felt that these options were limited. Bertz criticized the lack of an in-depth career mode, comparing the NHL 17 Be a Pro mode to the story-driven NBA 2K MyCareer mode, which he enjoyed more. He finished his review stating that the developers continue to make only "minor improvements across the board, yet the NHL series has yet to tap its true potential this generation."

== Notes and references ==
Notes
