= NBA Live 2005 =

2004 video game

- Cover art with Carmelo Anthony
- Developer: EA Canada
- Publisher: Electronic Arts
- Series: NBA Live
- Platforms: PlayStation 2, Xbox, GameCube, Windows
- Release: PlayStation 2, Xbox, GameCube: NA: September 28, 2004; AU: October 21, 2004 (PS2); AU: October 26, 2004 (Xbox); EU: October 29, 2004; JP: December 2, 2004 (PS2); Windows: NA: October 26, 2004; EU: November 12, 2004
- Genre: Sports (basketball)
- Modes: Single-player, multiplayer

NBA Live 2005 is the 2004 installment of the NBA Live sports video game series. The game was developed by EA Canada and released in 2004 for PlayStation 2, Xbox, GameCube, and Microsoft Windows.

== Gameplay ==
In-game screenshot of NBA Live 2005 (Windows)

- EA Sports Freestyle Air. This mode allows the game player to become an offensive force with new style dunks, user controlled tip-ins, and more.
- NBA All-Star Weekend. This mode allows the game player to play in the NBA All-Star Weekend, year-after-year, in Dynasty mode or go right to the Weekend in features on the main menu page. NBA All-Star Weekend includes the Rookie vs Sophomore game, the NBA All-Star game, the Slam Dunk competition and the 3 point competition.
- Create-A-Player. In this mode, gamers can create their own player and can customize the looks, shoes, and the college attended of the fictitious created player.

== Reception ==
Reception

Aggregate score
Aggregator	Score			
Aggregator	GameCube	PC	PS2	Xbox
Metacritic	83/100	79/100	84/100	85/100

Review scores
Publication	Score			
Publication	GameCube	PC	PS2	Xbox
Electronic Gaming Monthly	8.33/10	N/A	8.33/10	8.33/10
Famitsu	N/A	N/A	32/40	N/A
Game Informer	8.25/10	N/A	8.25/10	8.25/10
GamePro	4.5/5	N/A	4.5/5	4.5/5
GameRevolution	B	N/A	B	B
GameSpot	7.7/10	8/10	7.9/10	8/10
GameSpy	4/5	3.5/5	4.5/5	4.5/5
GameZone	N/A	8.7/10	8.5/10	8.5/10
IGN	8.8/10	8.9/10	8.9/10	8.9/10
Nintendo Power	3.8/5	N/A	N/A	N/A
Official U.S. PlayStation Magazine	N/A	N/A	4/5	N/A
Official Xbox Magazine (US)	N/A	N/A	N/A	9.3/10
PC Gamer (US)	N/A	82%	N/A	N/A

By July 2006, the PlayStation 2 version of NBA Live 2005 had sold 1.6 million copies and earned $54 million in the United States. Next Generation ranked it as the 24th highest-selling game launched for the PlayStation 2, Xbox or GameCube between January 2000 and July 2006 in that country. Combined sales of NBA Live console games released in the 2000s reached 8 million units in the United States by July 2006.

The game received "favorable" reviews on all platforms according to video game review aggregator Metacritic. In Japan, Famitsu gave the PlayStation 2 version a score of 32 out of 40.

== See also ==
- ESPN NBA 2K5
