= Bulls vs Lakers and the NBA Playoffs =

1992 video game

- North American box art
- Developer: Electronic Arts
- Publisher: Electronic Arts (Note: Released under the Electronic Arts Sports Network banner)
- Producer: Don Traeger
- Designers: Lisa Ching; Jeff A. Lefferts; Edwin W. Reich Jr.
- Programmers: Lisa Ching; Jeff A. Lefferts; Edwin W. Reich Jr.
- Composer: Michael Bartlow
- Series: NBA Playoffs
- Platform: Sega Genesis/Mega Drive
- Release: NA: May 1992; EU: August 1992
- Genre: Sports (basketball)
- Modes: Single-player, multiplayer

Bulls vs Lakers and the NBA Playoffs is a 1992 basketball video game developed and published by Electronic Arts for the Sega Genesis. It is the second game in the NBA Playoffs series, following 1989's Lakers versus Celtics and the NBA Playoffs. The game features the previous season's NBA championship series, the 1991 NBA Finals matchup between the Chicago Bulls and Los Angeles Lakers.

Bulls vs Lakers introduced a television broadcast-style presentation on the fictional Electronic Arts Sports Network. EA chief creative officer Bing Gordon was featured as the game announcer. This was also the first game to depict NBA team logos on the courts.

== Gameplay ==
The game can be played in various ways: players could play against each other, or against the computer. Games against the computer are divided into two modes, "Exhibition" or "Playoffs". Players can choose from one of the 16 teams that competed in the 1991 NBA Playoffs (up from eight in the first game). Rosters featured many top NBA stars of the time, including Michael Jordan. Games can be configured for two, five, eight or twelve minute quarters. New to the series is a star underneath the player to let users easily know which player they are controlling.

== Reception ==
Reception

Review score
Publication	Score
MegaTech	80%

MegaTech said that the game had impressive graphics and atmosphere, but that it did not play as fast as David Robinson's Supreme Court.
