= NBA Live 16 =

2015 basketball video game

- Cover art featuring Russell Westbrook
- Developer: EA Tiburon
- Publisher: EA Sports
- Series: NBA Live
- Platforms: PlayStation 4, Xbox One
- Release: NA: September 29, 2015; WW: October 1, 2015
- Genre: Sports
- Modes: Single-player, multiplayer

NBA Live 16 is a basketball simulation video game developed by EA Tiburon and published by EA Sports released for the PlayStation 4, and Xbox One on September 29, 2015, in North America, simultaneously with 2K Sports' NBA 2K16, and on October 1, 2015, worldwide. The 20th installment of NBA Live, its cover athlete is Russell Westbrook of the Oklahoma City Thunder. EA did not release a new installment in the series the following year, instead resuming in 2017 with NBA Live 18. A mobile version of NBA Live 16 released in-between, beating NBA 2K to the mobile market.

== Development ==
Improved defense play, offense play, passing play, shooting play, dribbling play, and more animations are included in NBA Live 16 as well as Freestyle Control and Movement with improved visuals. This game mode allows players to play basketball life on and off the court with more clothes and a new Game Face app for iOS and Android devices.

Live Run, a 5v5 online multiplayer mode, returned for the first time since NBA Live 10, while introducing a new cooperative mode, Summer Circuit. Both modes are set in outdoor and indoor venues across various real-life cities, such as Venice Beach, Brooklyn, and Seattle. EA Sports describes their new league vs. league tournaments stating, "Work as a team and score as many points as possible to earn a win. Each member in the tournament will get to play 3 quarters. Select an opponent to play and score as many points as possible while playing good defense." The Rising Star game mode allows players to create a character and work their way up to stardom in the NBA, leveling-up by using Experience Points earned after playing NBA games and in Pro-Am games.

== Reception ==
Reception

Aggregate score
Aggregator	Score
Metacritic	(PS4) 59/100 (XONE) 60/100

Review scores
Publication	Score
Computer Games Magazine	5/10
Electronic Gaming Monthly	6.5/10
Game Informer	6.5/10
GameRevolution	7/10
GameSpot	5/10
Hardcore Gamer	3/5
IGN	6.0/10

NBA Live 16 received generally mixed reviews on Metacritic. Critics highlighted improvements in game modes and overall quality of picture, but common complaints were associated with lag. Dissatisfied with gameplay, IGN rated the game 6.0 out of 10, stating, "flashy presentation and interesting new game modes can only go as far as the stiff and laggy gameplay will take it." IGN also noted clumsy controls that can only go so far within this game. Bleacher Report rated it 7.4, giving mostly positive statements, saying, "at its best, NBA Live 16 flows incredibly well with smooth back-and-forth action at venues spanning the globe and most times details look great in the process". EGMNOW rated the game 6.5 out of 10, citing mixed feelings, stating, "NBA Live 16 takes a small baby step forward with the franchise, but there are still core gameplay elements that need to be smoothed out before it can be a championship caliber game".
