= NBA Live 10 =

2009 basketball video game

- Cover art featuring Dwight Howard.
- Developers: EA Canada, HB Studios (PSP version)
- Publisher: Electronic Arts
- Series: NBA Live
- Platforms: PlayStation 3 Xbox 360; PlayStation Portable iOS
- Release: NA: October 6, 2009; AU: October 7, 2009; EU: October 9, 2009; AU: October 15, 2009 (PSP); EU: October 16, 2009 (X360); NA: October 23, 2009 (iOS); JP: November 5, 2009
- Genre: Sports
- Modes: Single-player, Multiplayer

NBA Live 10 is the 2009 installment in the NBA Live series, developed by EA Canada and published by Electronic Arts. Dwight Howard of the Orlando Magic is the cover athlete. It was released in 2009 for PlayStation 3, Xbox 360, PSP, and iOS (the latter under the title NBA Live by EA Sports). NBA Live 10 was to be followed by NBA Elite 11 which was cancelled in late 2010. The NBA Live series was discontinued for four years until NBA Live 14 in 2013, and was the last installment available for the PlayStation 3, Xbox 360 and PSP.

== Features ==
A new training facility called "The Hanger" was included as well. There were many improvements to the details of the players including their tattoos, hair, shoes, uniforms, signature shots, and moves. Also, "Dynamic DNA," introduced in NBA Live 09, was improved. NBA Live 10 also contained 31 authentic, fully licensed FIBA teams. This was the first year that pre-game rituals were in an NBA Live game.

Due to NBA Elite 11 being canceled, EA released free DLC for NBA Live 10, including free roster updates for the 2010–11 NBA season and free daily Dynamic DNA updates, for the entire 2010–11 NBA season.

== Downloadable content ==
On December 20, EA released a DLC for the game on the PlayStation Store and Xbox Live Marketplace called "NBA Live 10 Holiday shoe pack". The DLC featured 23 new shoes which were added in-game.

== NBA Player Takeover ==
NBA Player Takeover is an official blog from EA Sports that features certain players every week who have been impressive throughout the season and they use NBA Live 10 to show screenshots and examples of that player.

== FIBA teams ==
Players can compete in an international tournament using one of 24 available FIBA national teams.

== Reception ==
Reception

Aggregate scores
Aggregator	Score			
Aggregator	iOS	PS3	PSP	Xbox 360
GameRankings	68%	81%	62%	81%
Metacritic	N/A	81/100	64/100	80/100

Review scores
Publication	Score			
Publication	iOS	PS3	PSP	Xbox 360
1Up.com	N/A	B	N/A	B
Famitsu	N/A	29/40	N/A	29/40
Game Informer	N/A	7.5/10	N/A	7.5/10
GamePro	N/A	N/A	N/A	3.5/5
GameSpot	N/A	7.5/10	N/A	7.5/10
GameTrailers	N/A	N/A	N/A	8.3/10
GameZone	N/A	8.5/10	6.9/10	8.5/10
IGN	N/A	8.2/10	6.8/10	8.2/10
Official Xbox Magazine (US)	N/A	N/A	N/A	8/10
PlayStation: The Official Magazine	N/A	4/5	N/A	N/A
411Mania	N/A	N/A	N/A	8/10

The PlayStation 3 and Xbox 360 versions received "favorable" reviews, while the PSP version received "mixed" reviews, according to video game review aggregator Metacritic. In Japan, Famitsu gave the PS3 and Xbox 360 versions a score of one eight and three sevens for a total of 29 out of 40.

== See also ==
- NBA Live (video game series)
- NCAA Basketball 10
- NBA 2K10
