= NBA Live 2000 =

1999 basketball video game

- PlayStation cover art featuring San Antonio Spurs' Tim Duncan and the Chicago Bulls' Michael Jordan (top right)
- Developers: Playstation/Windows: EA Canada; Nintendo 64: NuFX
- Publisher: EA Sports
- Series: NBA Live
- Engine: Virtual Stadium
- Platforms: Windows, PlayStation, Nintendo 64
- Release: Windows, Nintendo 64: NA: October 29, 1999; EU: 1999 (PC); EU: December 1999 (N64); PlayStation: NA: November 16, 1999; EU: 1999
- Genre: Sports (Basketball)
- Modes: Single-player, Multiplayer

NBA Live 2000 is the 2000 installment of the NBA Live video game series. The cover features Tim Duncan of the San Antonio Spurs. The game was developed by EA Sports and released in 1999. Don Poier is the play-by-play announcer with Reggie Theus on color commentary. The game features Michael Jordan in his first official appearance in the series. The PC version of the game introduced EA's "Face in the Game" feature, allowing players to use custom facial photographs on created players. It was the second and final NBA Live game released for Nintendo 64. NBA Live 2000 is followed by NBA Live 2001. A canceled Game Boy Color version was in development by Handheld Games for THQ, but it was scrapped during testing.

== Features ==
- Take on Legendary NBA Players: All-Star teams from each of five past decades. Play with the Legends 1-on-1 or 5-on-5.
- Play with Michael Jordan: Go 1-on-1 in a street court duel or play him on a Legends team.
- Enhanced Player Animations: New in-game speech; hear on-court player reactions. High fives, knuckle touches and more.
- Deeper Franchise Mode: Full NBA draft and total team management.
- Face in the game: Download your, or any face onto a player model and play with the pros. Create a whole team of you and your friends.

== Notes ==
- NBA Live 2000 was the first game to include legendary players, including Michael Jordan who made his first (official) appearance in the series.
- The PC and PlayStation version of NBA Live 2000 supported Dolby Digital audio compression technologies
- One-on-One Mode made its debut in the game.
- The game saw the debut of Face in the Game which gave players the opportunity to import a photo to be used as a cyberface for a created player.
- The first (and last) game to feature the team of Don Poier and Reggie Theus on commentary.
- Dipset rapper Juelz Santana referenced this game in a 2000 freestyle rap on the hip-hop radio station HOT 97. "Y'all cop PlayStation, play Live 2000," said Santana. "Imma cop guns, try to survive 2000."

== Reception ==
Reception

Aggregate score
Aggregator	Score		
Aggregator	N64	PC	PS
GameRankings	80%	88%	85%

Review scores
Publication	Score		
Publication	N64	PC	PS
CNET Gamecenter	8/10	9/10	7/10
Computer Gaming World	N/A	5/5	N/A
Electronic Gaming Monthly	9/10	N/A	8.5/10 (Note: In Electronic Gaming Monthly's review of the PlayStation version, one critic gave it 8.5/10, two gave it each a score of 9/10, and another gave it 7.5/10.)
Game Informer	8.25/10	N/A	8.5/10
GameFan	N/A	N/A	(J.B.) 89% 88% (Note: In GameFan's viewpoint of the PlayStation version, one critic gave it 89, and the other 87.)
GameRevolution	N/A	N/A	C+
GameSpot	7.4/10	8.1/10	8.2/10
GameSpy	N/A	90%	N/A
IGN	7.1/10	9.2/10	8.8/10
Next Generation	N/A	N/A	4/5
Nintendo Power	7.9/10	N/A	N/A
Official U.S. PlayStation Magazine	N/A	N/A	4.5/5
PC Accelerator	N/A	8/10	N/A
PC Gamer (US)	N/A	90%	N/A

The game received "favorable" reviews on all platforms according to video game review aggregator GameRankings. Rob Smolka of NextGen said of the PlayStation version, "This is as good as a basketball game gets on the PlayStation." In Japan, where the same console version was ported and published by Electronic Arts Square on February 24, 2000, Famitsu gave it a score of 27 out of 40.

Brett Alan Weiss of AllGame gave the PlayStation version four-and-a-half stars out of five, calling it "the most complete and most fun basketball game to ever grace the PlayStation." However, Anthony Baize of the same website gave the Nintendo 64 version three-and-a-half stars out of five, saying, "NBA Live 2000 is probably the best basketball simulation to hit the N64 in the late 1990s. If you like hard-driving basketball action, then NBA Live 2000 is a game you want in your collection." William Abner of Computer Games Strategy Plus gave the same PC version four stars out of five, saying, "NBA Live 2000 is a fun basketball game even with the quirks. If you are a fan of the NBA Live series then Live 2000 is a must buy." Martin Kitts of N64 Magazine gave the N64 version 65%, saying, "Dedicated Michael Jordan fans will lap it up but NBA Live 2000 isn't the basketball game for the rest of us."

The Rookie of GamePro said of the N64 version, "While it's not the most perfect hoops game in the world, it still offers the gameplay goods to satisfy any fan of the sport." (Note: GamePro gave the Nintendo 64 version two 4.5/5 scores for graphics and overall fun factor, and two 3.5/5 scores for sound and control in one review.) iBot said of the same console version, "Most of the innovations are good [...] but the graphical weaknesses and the useless Arcade mode make NBA Live 2000 seem like there's room at the top for another hoops title to take the crown on Nintendo 64." (Note: GamePro gave the Nintendo 64 version 3.5/5 for graphics, two 4/5 scores for sound and overall fun factor, and 3/5 for control in another review.) Andrew S. Bub said of the PC version, "All the new modes, the improved graphics, and the fantastic gameplay make NBA Live 2000 worth the extra cash." (Note: GamePro gave the PC version 5/5 for graphics, 3/5 for sound, 4/5 for control, and 4.5/5 for overall fun factor.) Uncle Dust stated in one review, "With all of the players and then some, terrific control, very solid graphics, and tight game play, NBA Live 2000 for the PlayStation is at the top of its division, much better than it's [sic] N64 counterpart and solid competition for any hoops title on any system." (Note: GamePro gave the PlayStation version two 4.5/5 scores for graphics and sound, and two 5/5 scores for control and overall fun factor in one review.) The Enforcer said that the same console version "continues the series' tradition of excellence, giving games all they could want in a basketball title with its stellar graphics, fast frame rate, and ungodly roster of all-time greats." (Note: GamePro gave the PlayStation version two 4.5/5 scores for graphics and control, 4/5 for sound, and 5/5 for overall fun factor in another review.)

Computer Games Strategy Plus, Computer Gaming World, and PC Gamer US nominated the PC version for their 1999 "Sports Game of the Year" (CGSP, CGW) and "Best Sports Game" (PCGUS) awards, all of which ultimately went to High Heat Baseball 2000. The staff of CGSP called it "Trash-talking hoops action of the finest blend. What it lacks in subtlety it makes up for in its Airness--as in Jordan"; and PCGUS' staff wrote, "the on-court play is the best in the business thanks to a major improvement of the computer AI, and the franchise mode is as much fun as the actual gameplay." It was also nominated for CNET Gamecenter's "Best Sports Game" award, which lost to NHL 2000; and for the "Sports Game of the Year" award at GameSpot's Best & Worst of 1999 Awards, which went to High Heat Baseball 2000.

Said PC version alone sold 73,101 units by April 2000.
