= NBA Live 08 =

2007 basketball video game

- PlayStation 3 cover art featuring Gilbert Arenas
- Developers: EA Canada (PS3, X360); HB Studios (PS2, PC, Wii, & PSP)
- Publisher: EA Sports
- Series: NBA Live
- Platforms: PlayStation 2; PlayStation 3; PlayStation Portable; Wii; Xbox 360; Windows
- Release: October 2, 2007: PlayStation 2 & Xbox 360; NA: October 2, 2007; AU: October 4, 2007; EU: October 5, 2007 PlayStation 3; NA: October 2, 2007; AU: October 11, 2007; EU: October 12, 2007 Wii; NA: October 2, 2007; AU: October 25, 2007; EU: October 26, 2007 PlayStation Portable; NA: October 2, 2007; AU: December 6, 2007; EU: December 7, 2007 Windows; AU: October 25, 2007; EU: October 26, 2007; NA: October 30, 2007
- Genre: Sports
- Modes: Single-player, multiplayer

In-game screenshot of NBA Live 08 (PC version)

NBA Live 08 is the 2007 installment of the NBA Live series by EA Sports. It was released for the PlayStation 2, Xbox 360, PlayStation 3, Wii, Windows and PlayStation Portable. This is the first NBA video game to include all three next-generation consoles, the first game to be released for Sony's PlayStation 3, and the last NBA Live game for the Windows platform.

== Reception ==
Reception

Aggregate score
| Aggregator | Score | | | | | |
| Aggregator | PC | PS2 | PS3 | PSP | Wii | Xbox 360 |
|---|---|---|---|---|---|---|
| Metacritic | 67/100 | 68/100 | 73/100 | 73/100 | 52/100 | 73/100 |

Review scores
| Publication | Score | | | | | |
| Publication | PC | PS2 | PS3 | PSP | Wii | Xbox 360 |
|---|---|---|---|---|---|---|
| 1Up.com | N/A | N/A | C+ | B | N/A | C+ |
| Electronic Gaming Monthly | N/A | N/A | 6.83/10 | N/A | N/A | 6.83/10 |
| Famitsu | N/A | 28/40 | 32/40 | 30/40 | N/A | 32/40 |
| Game Informer | N/A | N/A | 7.5/10 | N/A | N/A | 7.5/10 |
| GameSpot | N/A | 6.5/10 | 7.5/10 | 6.5/10 | 3/10 | 7.5/10 |
| GameSpy | N/A | 3.5/5 | 3.5/5 | 3.5/5 | N/A | 3.5/5 |
| GameZone | N/A | 6/10 | 7.8/10 | 6.8/10 | 6.5/10 | 8.3/10 |
| IGN | N/A | 5.5/10 | 6.9/10 | 7.3/10 | 4.9/10 | 6.9/10 |
| Nintendo Life | N/A | N/A | N/A | N/A | 2/10 | N/A |
| Official Xbox Magazine (US) | N/A | N/A | N/A | N/A | N/A | 8/10 |
| PC Gamer (UK) | 77% | N/A | N/A | N/A | N/A | N/A |
| PlayStation: The Official Magazine | N/A | 8/10 | 8.5/10 | N/A | N/A | N/A |
| USA Today | N/A | N/A | 8/10 | N/A | N/A | 8/10 |

The game received "mixed or average reviews" on all platforms according to video game review aggregator website Metacritic. In Japan, Famitsu gave it a score of all four eights for the PlayStation 3 and Xbox 360 versions; one seven, two eights, and one seven for the PSP version; and all four sevens for the PlayStation 2 version.

== See also ==
- NBA 2K8
