= NBA Live 06 =

2005 video game

- European cover featuring Dwyane Wade
- Developer: EA Canada
- Publisher: EA Sports
- Series: NBA Live
- Platforms: GameCube; PlayStation 2; Windows; Xbox; Xbox 360; PlayStation Portable; Mobile
- Release: September 26, 2005: GameCube, PS2, Windows, Xbox; NA: September 26, 2005; EU: October 7, 2005; AU: October 10, 2005; EU: October 21, 2005 (PC) PlayStation Portable; NA: October 4, 2005; AU: October 26, 2005; EU: October 28, 2005 Mobile; NA: October 11, 2005 Xbox 360; NA: November 17, 2005; EU: December 2, 2005; AU: March 23, 2006
- Genre: Sports
- Modes: Single-player, multiplayer

NBA Live 06 is a 2005 installment of the NBA Live series released for Windows, PlayStation 2, GameCube, Xbox, Xbox 360, PlayStation Portable, and mobile devices. It was developed by EA Canada and published by Electronic Arts under the EA Sports publishing label. The game features several game modes, including Dynasty, Season, Playoffs, or Free Play. It features Dwyane Wade of the Miami Heat on the cover. This was the last NBA Live game on the GameCube and it also was the first NBA Live game on the Xbox 360 as a launch title and on the PlayStation Portable.

== Gameplay ==
=== Dynasty mode ===
In Dynasty Mode, the game player chooses one team and runs a dynasty which overlaps many seasons. Decisions are made as to the number of games per season, the difficulty level, trade players, and sign new players along with hiring coaches. Games can be simulated. Dynasty Mode contains an All-Star weekend, except the players or rosters are according to the Dynasty Season. The game player hires the coaching staff and runs a training camp which may be simulated. There is also a trade deadline. This mode is not on the PSP version.

=== Season mode ===
In Season Mode, the gamer plays only a single season of basketball. The gamer can trade, sign, and drop players.

=== Playoffs mode ===
In the Playoffs, the game player participates in the playoffs with teams either from the Eastern or Western Conference. The default teams are those that were in the 2004-05 playoffs.

=== All-Star Weekend ===
In the All-Star Weekend mode, the game player can choose to participate in a rookie game, a dunk contest, or a 3-point contest. In the dunk contest, fancy dunks are attempted and the player with the most points wins. In the 3 point contest, as many 3 pointers are attempted as possible. All-Star Weekend is announced by TNT Inside the NBA host Ernie Johnson, and analyst Kenny Smith.

== Reception ==
Reception

Aggregate scores
Aggregator	Score						
Aggregator	GameCube	mobile	PC	PS2	PSP	Xbox	Xbox 360
GameRankings	74%	71%	69%	77%	78%	79%	65%
Metacritic	76/100	N/A	71/100	77/100	80/100	79/100	64/100

Review scores
Publication	Score						
Publication	GameCube	mobile	PC	PS2	PSP	Xbox	Xbox 360
Electronic Gaming Monthly	7.33/10	N/A	N/A	7.33/10	N/A	7.33/10	7.5/10
Famitsu	N/A	N/A	N/A	32/40	28/40	N/A	(X360) 32/40; 30/40
Game Informer	7.5/10	N/A	N/A	7.5/10	N/A	7.5/10	6.75/10
GamePro	N/A	N/A	N/A	4/5	4.5/5	4/5	3.5/5
GameRevolution	B−	N/A	N/A	B−	N/A	B−	D+
GameSpot	7.7/10	N/A	N/A	7.7/10	7.6/10	7.7/10	6.4/10
GameSpy	4/5	N/A	2.5/5	4.5/5	4/5	4.5/5	2.5/5
GameTrailers	N/A	N/A	N/A	N/A	N/A	N/A	6.5/10
GameZone	N/A	N/A	8.4/10	8.9/10	8.1/10	8.9/10	6/10
IGN	9/10	7.1/10	9/10	9/10	7.8/10	9/10	5.9/10
Nintendo Power	5.5/10	N/A	N/A	N/A	N/A	N/A	N/A
Official Nintendo Magazine	69%	N/A	N/A	N/A	N/A	N/A	N/A
Official U.S. PlayStation Magazine	N/A	N/A	N/A	3/5	3/5	N/A	N/A
Official Xbox Magazine (US)	N/A	N/A	N/A	N/A	N/A	8.7/10	7/10
PC Gamer (US)	N/A	N/A	78%	N/A	N/A	N/A	N/A
Detroit Free Press	N/A	N/A	N/A	3/4	N/A	N/A	N/A
Maxim	8/10	N/A	8/10	8/10	N/A	8/10	N/A

The Xbox, PSP, PlayStation 2 and GameCube versions received "generally favorable reviews", while the PC and Xbox 360 versions received "mixed or average reviews" according to video game review aggregator Metacritic. In Japan, Famitsu gave the PS2 version a score of all four eights for a total of 32 out of 40; the same magazine gave the Xbox 360 version a score of two eights and two sevens for a total of 30 out of 40, while giving the PSP version a score of one eight, two sevens, and one six, for a total of 28 out of 40. Famitsu Xbox 360, on the other hand, gave its Xbox 360 version a score of all four eights, for a total of 32 out of 40.

== See also ==
- NBA 2K6
