= Don Poier =

American sports announcer (1951–2005)

- Born: February 24, 1951; Snohomish, Washington, U.S.
- Died: January 21, 2005 (aged 53); Denver, Colorado, U.S.
- Occupations: Sportscaster, Play-by-play announcer, Area announcer
- Years active: 1970s–2005

Donald Robert Poier (February 24, 1951 – January 21, 2005) was an American sports play-by-play announcer who called telecasts of Pac-10 football and basketball games and was the radio and television voice for the Vancouver / Memphis Grizzlies.

== Early life ==
Born in Snohomish, northeast of Seattle, Poier was a three-sport standout in baseball, basketball and football at Snohomish High School, where he played first base, forward and punter/quarterback/tight end/defensive back. He starred on Dick Armstrong's first league-champion football team in 1968, earning all-state honors as a DB.

After playing basketball on the freshmen team at Washington State University, Poier transferred to Pacific Lutheran University, where he played defensive end on the football team from 1972 to 1973 for legendary coach Frosty Westering.

== Career ==
Poier spent more than 20 years of his broadcasting career in Seattle, announcing regional basketball and football games in the Pac-10 and hydroplane boat races. In the 1980s he was the sports director at KING-TV (NBC), and later worked at KCPQ (Fox) and Prime Sports Northwest.

In 1995, Poier moved to the professional ranks, joining the Vancouver Grizzlies of the NBA during their inaugural year. Before that, the only professional games he had called were in the NBA, providing play-by-play for the Seattle SuperSonics during the exhibition seasons of the early 1980s and major league baseball, as a broadcaster for the Seattle Mariners in the 1981 season. He and former NBA player and sportscaster Bob Elliott gained national recognition by lending their voices to EA Sports' NBA Live series video games from 1999 through 2003. After doing radio play-by-play for every Grizzlies game during his tenure in Vancouver and Memphis, he was promoted to television play-by-play for the 2004–05 NBA season.

== Death ==
On January 21, 2005, Poier was found dead of an apparent heart attack in his Denver hotel room before the Grizzlies' game against the Nuggets. The Grizzlies decided to play the game in spite of Poier's sudden death, and lost by a final score of 92–82. He was 53 years old, weeks away from his 54th birthday.

The media center at FedExForum, the Grizzlies' home arena in Memphis, has been named in honor of Poier. In addition, a memorial banner hangs from the ceiling at every Grizzlies home game.
