= List of United States Supreme Court cases, volume 525 =

This is a list of all the United States Supreme Court cases from volume 525 of the United States Reports:

Case name	Citation	Date decided
United States v. Louisiana	525 U.S. 1	1998
Marquez v. Screen Actors	525 U.S. 33	November 3, 1998
Pfaff v. Wells Electronics, Inc.	525 U.S. 55	1998
Wright v. Universal Maritime Service Corp.	525 U.S. 70	1998
Minnesota v. Carter	525 U.S. 83	1998
Knowles v. Iowa	525 U.S. 113	1998
Mosley v. United States	525 U.S. 120	1998
Haddle v. Garrison	525 U.S. 121	1998
NYNEX Corp. v. Discon, Inc.	525 U.S. 128	1998
Calderon v. Coleman	525 U.S. 141	1998
In re Kennedy	525 U.S. 153	1999
El Al Israel Airlines, Ltd. v. Tsui Yuan Tseng	525 U.S. 155	1999
Buckley v. American Constitutional Law Foundation, Inc.	525 U.S. 182	1999
West Covina v. Perkins	525 U.S. 234	1999
Roberts v. Galen of Va., Inc.	525 U.S. 249	1999
Department of Army v. Blue Fox, Inc.	525 U.S. 255	1999
Lopez v. Monterey County	525 U.S. 266	1999
Humana Inc. v. Forsyth	525 U.S. 299	1999
California Public Employees' Retirement System v. Felzen	525 U.S. 315	1999
Department of Commerce v. United States House of Representatives	525 U.S. 316	1999
Census figures adjusted for an undercount based on sampling may not be used for Congressional apportionment.
AT&T Corp. v. Iowa Utilities Bd.	525 U.S. 366	1999
Hughes Aircraft Co. v. Jacobson	525 U.S. 432	1999
Your Home Visiting Nurse Services, Inc. v. Shalala	525 U.S. 449	1999
National Collegiate Athletic Assn. v. Smith	525 U.S. 459	1999
Reno v. American-Arab Anti-Discrimination Committee	525 U.S. 471	1999
Murdaugh v. Livingston	525 U.S. 1301	November 18, 1998
