= NCAA v. Board of Regents of the University of Oklahoma =

1984 U.S. Supreme Court decision on antitrust

- Supreme Court of the United States

Argued March 20, 1984 Decided June 27, 1984
- Full case name: National Collegiate Athletic Association v. Board of Regents of the University of Oklahoma, et al.
- Citations: 468 U.S. 85 (more) 104 S. Ct. 2948; 82 L. Ed. 2d 70; 1984 U.S. LEXIS 130
- Decision: Opinion

Case history
- Prior: The Board of Regents of the University of Oklahoma, et al. v. National Collegiate Athletic Association, 546 F. Supp. 1276 (W.D. Okla. 1982), The Board of Regents of the University of Oklahoma, et al. v. National Collegiate Athletic Association, 707 F.2d 1147 (10th Cir. 1983); cert. granted, 464 U.S. 913 (1983).
- Subsequent: The Board of Regents of the University of Oklahoma, et al. v. National Collegiate Athletic Association, 601 F. Supp. 307 (W.D. Okla. 1984)

Holding
- The NCAA's television plan violates § 1 of the Sherman Act.

Court membership
- Chief Justice Warren E. Burger Associate Justices William J. Brennan Jr. · Byron White; Thurgood Marshall · Harry Blackmun; Lewis F. Powell Jr. · William Rehnquist; John P. Stevens · Sandra Day O'Connor

Case opinions
- Majority: Stevens, joined by Burger, Brennan, Marshall, Blackmun, Powell, O'Connor
- Dissent: White, joined by Rehnquist

Laws applied
- 15 U.S.C. §§ 1–7; 15 U.S.C. §§ 12–27; and 29 U.S.C. §§ 52–53

NCAA v. Board of Regents of the University of Oklahoma, 468 U.S. 85 (1984), was a landmark case in which the Supreme Court of the United States held that the National Collegiate Athletic Association (NCAA) television plan violated the Sherman and Clayton Antitrust Acts, which were designed to prohibit group actions that restrained open competition and trade.

The NCAA is an organization that regulates college athletics, and membership is voluntary, although NCAA schools are not allowed to play against non-NCAA teams. The case dealt with television rights to college football games, which were controlled by the NCAA and limited the appearance of university teams in each season. The NCAA believed that their control of television rights protected live attendance, which was disputed by a number of colleges.

These larger colleges formed the College Football Association to negotiate television contracts, until the NCAA advised the colleges that they would be banned from all NCAA competitions, not just in football. The Board of Regents of the University of Oklahoma and the University of Georgia Athletic Association sued to force the NCAA to stop the practice. The Supreme Court held 7–2 that the NCAA's actions were a restraint of trade and ruled for the universities.

== Background ==
=== Antitrust law ===
The Sherman Antitrust Act was enacted in 1890 to oppose the use of combinations, monopolies or cartels that harmed free and open trade. It prohibited the restraint of trade. The Clayton Antitrust Act was enacted in 1914 to address shortcomings discovered in the Sherman Act. It specified the prohibited conduct, an enforcement scheme, and remedial measures. The Clayton Act allows for private parties to bring suit for treble damages and for injunctive relief. From 1922 (when Federal Baseball Club v. National League ruled that baseball was not considered interstate commerce) until the late 1950s, sporting events were considered to be exempt from both acts, until the Supreme Court decision in International Boxing Club v. United States.

=== Control of televised games ===
The National Collegiate Athletics Association (NCAA) is a private non-profit organization founded in 1910 to regulate collegiate athletics. In the 1980s it consisted of approximately 900 college and university members, although only 187 participated in Division I football. (Note: As of March 2019, the NCAA membership is 1,117.) In 1938, the first college football game was commercially televised by the University of Pennsylvania. (Note: According to the Supreme Court opinion. It actually appears that the first commercially televised game was between Pennsylvania and the University of Maryland in 1940, while the absolute first televised college game was Fordham University and Waynesburg University in 1939.) From 1940 to 1950, all of Pennsylvania's home games were televised. Beginning in 1952 and continuing through 1957, the NCAA commissioned a study by National Opinion Research Center to determine the effect of televising college football games on a number of areas, including live attendance. The studies indicated that live television coverage of college football decreased attendance for teams that were not being televised. Based on these studies, the NCAA began to institute controls beginning in 1953 through its Football Television Committee (Committee). (Note: According to the opinion of the District Court. The Supreme Court stated that regulation began in 1951, prior to the studies.) The Committee initially determined that there would be only one televised game every Saturday and that no team would appear in a televised game more than once per season. In addition, it was determined that the revenue would be shared by the teams playing the televised game and the NCAA.

The initial restriction was supported by all of the NCAA member schools (Note: Of the approximately 850 voting members of the NCAA, only 187 played NCAA Division I football.) with the exception of Pennsylvania, who stated that they would continue to televise their home games. The NCAA declared that Pennsylvania was a member in bad standing, and the four schools scheduled to play them at home refused to do so. Pennsylvania then agreed to abide by the NCAA rules on televising games. From 1952 to 1977, the NCAA submitted an annual plan to all member schools, who voted on it by mail. After 1977, the member schools voted on "Principles of Negotiation" instead of the actual plan. Only one network would hold a contract with the NCAA to broadcast games at a time. Although all major television networks had held the contract at various times, from 1965 to 1981, the American Broadcasting Company (ABC) had held the contract.

=== College Football Association ===
Partially as a result of dissatisfaction with the NCAA's control of the television market, the College Football Association (CFA) was formed, consisting of major college football programs. (Note: The CFA consisted of members of the Atlantic Coast Conference, the Big Eight Conference, the Southeastern Conference, the Southwest Conference, the Western Athletic Conference and independents Notre Dame, Penn State, Pittsburgh, and the service academies. The Big Ten Conference and the Pacific-10 Conference did not participate.) In 1979, the CFA, through its executive director Chuck Neinas, began to negotiate a television contract for its members with the National Broadcasting Company (NBC), despite the then ongoing NCAA negotiations with both ABC and the Columbia Broadcasting System (CBS). On learning of the CFA's negotiations, the NCAA issued an "Official Interpretation" stating that "The Association shall control all forms of televising of the intercollegiate football games of member institutions during the traditional football season..." The CFA continued to work on a contract with NBC and came to an agreement on August 8, 1981. The NCAA swiftly stated that universities that participated in the CFA contract would face NCAA sanctions, not just in football, but in all other sports as well. Two member schools of the CFA, the University of Oklahoma and the University of Georgia, filed suit in the United States District Court for the Western District of Oklahoma seeking an injunction to prevent the NCAA from taking action against CFA members. (Note: Despite the injunction being granted, the CFA was unable to gain agreement from enough teams to meet their commitment to NBC, and the agreement was canceled.)

=== District court ===
On being filed on September 8, 1981, District Judge Lee Roy West recused himself from the case, being an alumnus of the University of Oklahoma for both his undergraduate and law degrees. Judge Juan Guerrero Burciaga of New Mexico was then appointed to hear the case. During the trial, the NCAA claimed that it was a voluntary organization and if the plaintiffs or other schools did not wish to abide by the NCAA rules, they were free to terminate their membership. It was shown that the amount of money paid by ABC to teams appearing on television was established by Thomas C. Hansen, the NCAA Television Program Director. (Note: For 1978, teams appearing on national television received US$533,600 and on regional broadcasts they received US$401,222. The NCAA took the rest (US$4,008,210), which included earmarks for Division II and III games.) Universities were not allowed to negotiate their own terms. Burciaga pointed out an example of the control and price fixing by noting that in 1981, Oklahoma and the University of Southern California (both then ranked in the top 5 of the AP Poll and the Coaches' Poll) appeared on 200 stations in a regional broadcast. On the same weekend, ABC televised a game between The Citadel and Appalachian State on four stations. All four teams received the same amount of money for appearing.

Burciaga found that not only did the NCAA engage in price fixing, they acted to limit production by restricting the number of games that could be broadcast. The NCAA further threatened universities with a group boycott if they did not agree to the terms dictated by the NCAA. He noted that ABC had encouraged the NCAA to seek an exemption from antitrust laws from Congress, but that the NCAA did not believe that they could obtain the exemption.

Burciaga then examined the conduct of the NCAA under both the per se rule and the rule of reason. Finding that the NCAA violated antitrust laws under both evaluations, Burciaga issued both a declaratory judgment and a permanent injunction prohibiting the NCAA from interfering with the individual universities' television contracts and declaring the NCAA-ABC contract null and void. The NCAA then appealed the decision to the Tenth Circuit Court of Appeals.

=== Circuit Court of Appeals ===
The Tenth Circuit heard the case before Chief Judge James E. Barrett and Judges James K. Logan and Stephanie K. Seymour. In the appeal, the NCAA argued that Oklahoma and Georgia did not have standing to bring the suit, claiming that the schools suffered no actual injury. Logan, who wrote the opinion, flatly rejected that argument.

The court then turned to whether the case should be evaluated under the per se rule or the rule of reason. Deciding on the per se rule, the court rejected the NCAA arguments that the television plan promoted live attendance, that it promoted balanced athletic competition, and that televised football competed with other, non-sports programs. The court noted that the NCAA plan restricted output and affirmed the trial court's per se ruling, while also holding that the district court erred in ruling television plan and contract constituted a group boycott.

Chief Judge Barrett dissented, believing that the restraints were reasonable under the rule of reason and that the NCAA has an overwhelming interest in preserving the amateur nature of intercollegiate athletics. He would have reversed the district court, quashed the injunction, and held that there was no antitrust violation.

The NCAA again appealed, and the Supreme Court granted certiorari to hear the case.

== Opinion of the Court ==
=== Arguments ===
Frank H. Easterbrook argued the case for the NCAA and Andy Coats represented Oklahoma and Georgia. The United States Solicitor General, Rex E. Lee, filed an amicus curae brief in support of Oklahoma and Georgia, and argued the cause to the court. Other amicus briefs were filed by the National Federation of State High School Associations (supporting the NCAA) and the Association of Independent Television Stations (supporting Oklahoma and Georgia).

=== Majority opinion ===
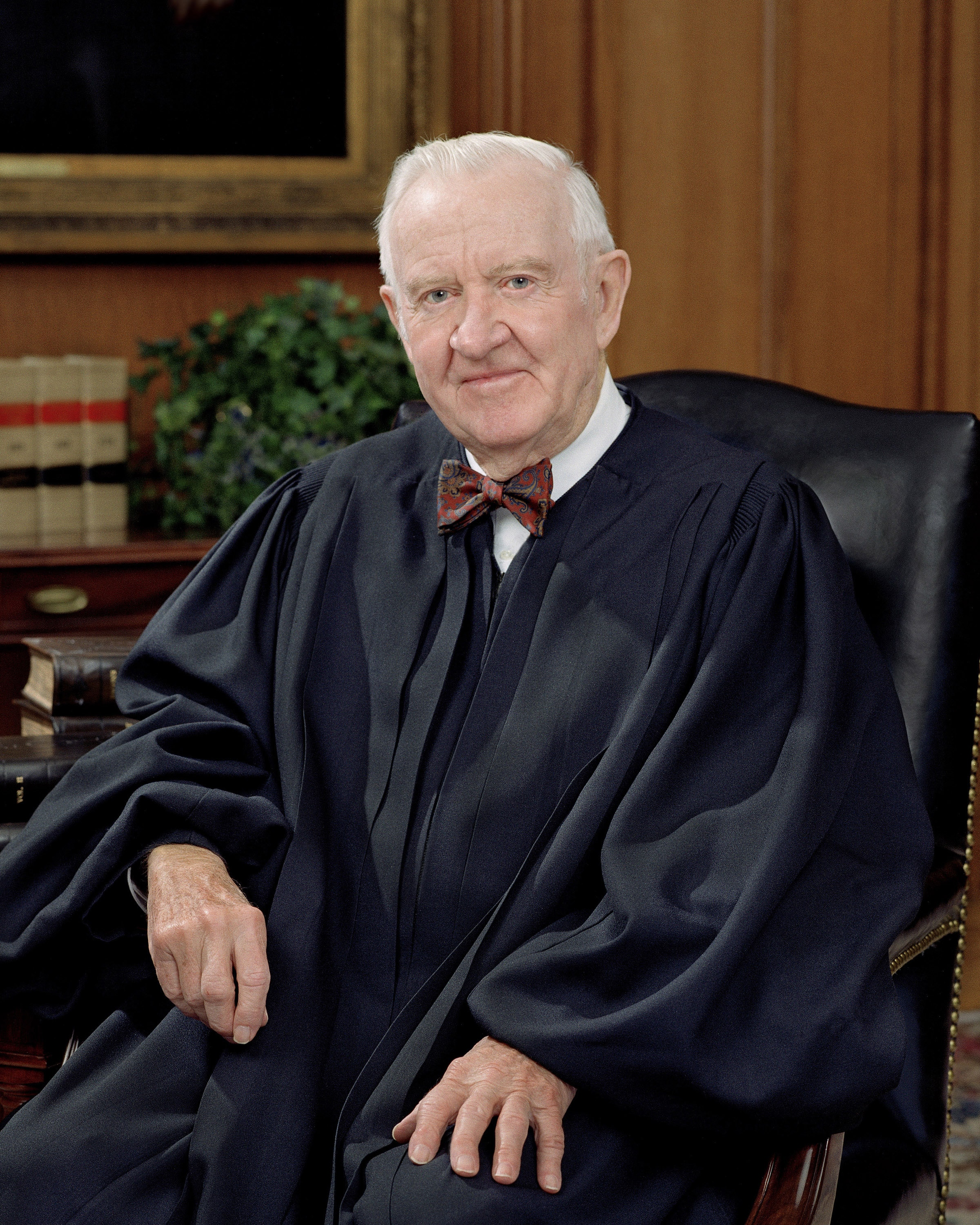
Justice John P. Stevens, author of the majority opinion

Justice John Paul Stevens delivered the opinion of the court. Stevens stated that "There can be no doubt that the challenged practices of the NCAA constitute a 'restraint of trade'" but noted not all restraints of trade were unreasonable, and that only an unreasonable restraint was prohibited by the Sherman Antitrust Act. Stevens noted that a league governing body was necessary for sporting events to take place and determined that the rule of reason, not per se rules applied to the case. Stevens determined that since the NCAA restrained price and output, it created a system that was unrelated to a free and competitive market. (Note: Stevens quoted the District Court opinion, noting that "In a competitive market, each college fielding a football team would be free to sell the right to televise its games for whatever price it could get. The prices would vary for the games, with games between prominent schools drawing a larger price than games between less prominent schools. Games between the more prominent schools would draw a larger audience than other games.") Since the NCAA television plan constituted a restraint of trade on its face, it placed the burden on the NCAA of establishing an affirmative defense that would justify the deviation from a free market.

Stevens then went through the justifications that were offered by the NCAA. First, although the NCAA claimed that the television plan was a joint venture, he noted that unlike Broadcast Music, Inc. v. Columbia Broadcast System, Inc., the NCAA was not acting as a selling agent and that the sales occurred in a noncompetitive market. Stevens evaluated the NCAA's claim that the television plan enhanced the competitiveness of college football. Since the district court found no procompetitive efficiencies from the arrangement, Stevens rejected this justification. He also said that there was no need to penetrate the market against "nonexistent" competitors. Stevens likewise rejected the defense that the television plan was designed to protect live attendance, stating " The NCAA's argument that its television plan is necessary to protect live attendance is not based on a desire to maintain the integrity of college football as a distinct and attractive product, but rather on a fear that the product will not prove sufficiently attractive to draw live attendance when faced with competition from televised games."

The NCAA position that an interest in maintaining a competitive balance justified the television plan was also rejected. While agreeing with the desire to maintain such a balance, Stevens noted that there was no evidence that the plan succeeded in that effort. (Note: Quoting the district court, Stevens noted that the "NCAA has been strikingly unsuccessful if it has indeed attempted to prevent the emergence of a 'power elite' in intercollegiate football.") The decision of the circuit court was affirmed.

=== Dissent ===
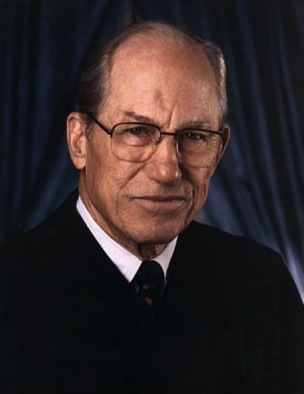
Justice Byron White, author of the dissent

Justice Byron White, joined by Justice William Rehnquist, dissented from the majority opinion. White, a former college football star at Colorado, stated that while intercollegiate athletics bore a superficial resemblance to professional sports, it was clear that other, non-commercial goals played the main role. Its actions are based on the unique nature of college athletics, and White felt that the restrictions were reasonable. He would have overturned the circuit court. White was not convinced that Oklahoma or Georgia had shown either an increase in prices or a decrease in output.

== Subsequent developments ==
As a direct result of this ruling, more games were televised which had the initial effect of driving television revenues down. This trend reversed, and by 1991, Notre Dame had signed a contract with NBC to broadcast all home games for a five-year period, a contract which has been renewed several times and remains in effect through 2029. In 2009–10, the University of Texas at Austin reported profits of almost $69 million just from football. Most of this money was earned in television contracts before Texas added its own Longhorn Network which paid approximately $15 million per year (the Longhorn Network was shut down on July 1, 2024 when Texas officially joined the Southeastern Conference). The major conferences have reshuffled multiple times, most dramatically in the early 2010s and the 2020s, and the landscape of college football has changed significantly. Individual universities, their associated athletic conferences, and the individual bowl games continue to increase their revenue streams from television. As the profits for the universities and their athletics departments have grown, some have argued that the sense of exploitation of the amateur athlete has also grown. In 2023, Andy Coats, the lawyer who had represented Oklahoma and Georgia, admitted to NBC News that the ruling "screwed up college football across the board ... [B]ut I don't think anyone could have predicted what would happen".

== See also ==
- List of United States Supreme Court cases, volume 468
- National Collegiate Athletic Association v. Smith
