= Pfaff v. Wells Electronics, Inc. =

- Supreme Court of the United States

Argued October 6, 1998 Decided November 10, 1998
- Full case name: Wayne K. Pfaff v. Wells Electronics, Incorporated
- Citations: 525 U.S. 55 (more) 119 S. Ct. 304; 142 L. Ed. 2d 261; 1998 U.S. LEXIS 7268; 67 U.S.L.W. 4009; 48 U.S.P.Q.2d (BNA) 1641; 98 Cal. Daily Op. Service 8319; 98 Daily Journal DAR 11535; 1998 Colo. J. C.A.R. 5775

Case history
- Prior: Summary judgment granted to defendant, 1992 U.S. Dist. LEXIS 22592 (N.D. Tex. 1992); reversed and remanded, 5 F.3d 514 (Fed. Cir. 1993); partial judgment granted to plaintiff, 995 U.S. Dist. LEXIS 21747 (N.D. Tex. 1995); affirmed in part, reversed in part, 124 F.3d 1429 (Fed. Cir. 1997); rehearing denied, 1997 U.S. App. LEXIS 28585 (Fed. Cir. 1997); certiorari granted in part, 523 U.S. 1003 (1998)
- Subsequent: Rehearing denied, 525 U.S. 1003 (1094)

Holding
- An invention is "on sale" within the meaning of the statutory bar of 35 U.S.C. § 102(b), if it is 1) the subject of a commercial transaction, and 2) capable of being patented because at that time, either because it had in fact been reduced to practice, or because it was sufficiently well described for another person skilled in the art to build the invention from the designs. Federal Circuit affirmed.

Court membership
- Chief Justice William Rehnquist Associate Justices John P. Stevens · Sandra Day O'Connor; Antonin Scalia · Anthony Kennedy; David Souter · Clarence Thomas; Ruth Bader Ginsburg · Stephen Breyer

Case opinion
- Majority: Stevens, joined by unanimous

Laws applied
- 35 U.S.C. § 102(b)

Pfaff v. Wells Electronics, Inc., 525 U.S. 55 (1998), was a decision by the Supreme Court of the United States that determined what constituted being "on sale" for the purposes of barring the grant of a patent for an invention.

== Background of the case ==
In November 1980, the plaintiff, engineer Wayne Pfaff, was asked by Texas Instruments to design for them a socket for the mounting and removal of semiconductor chip carriers. Pfaff proceeded to draw designs for the socket, which he showed to Texas Instruments in March 1981. On April 8, 1981, Texas Instruments provided a written purchase order to buy over 30,000 of the sockets. The sockets were not actually built, however, until July 1981.

Pfaff applied for a patent for the socket on April 19, 1982, and received the patent in 1985. He then proceeded to sue the defendant, Wells Electronics, Inc., for patent infringement when Wells made a socket that was too similar to Pfaff's design. Wells, in defense, claimed that Pfaff's patent was invalid. In support of this assertion, Wells pointed to 35 U.S.C. § 102(b), which states that an inventor shall not be entitled to a patent if:

...the invention was patented or described in a printed publication in this or a foreign country or in public use or on sale in this country, more than one year prior to the date of the application for patent in the US.

Wells asserted that by accepting the purchase order from Texas Instruments, Pfaff had placed the invention "on sale" one year and one week before applying for the patent, which would make it invalid under § 102(b). Pfaff countered that the invention had not been reduced to practice, meaning that a working model had not yet been made. Pfaff's contention was that the invention was not complete at the time of the purchase order, and therefore could not have been "on sale" yet.

The District Court for the Northern District of Texas upheld Pfaff's patent, but the Court of Appeals for the Federal Circuit reversed, finding the patent invalid because the invention was "substantially complete" at the time of the sale. Pfaff then appealed to the Supreme Court.

== Issue ==
The Supreme Court noted that lower courts had offered different opinions on the question of whether an invention could be "on sale" within the meaning of the statute before it had actually reduced to practice. The Court therefore had to set a standard for when an invention would be considered complete enough to be "on sale".

== The court's decision ==
The Court, in a unanimous opinion written by Justice John Paul Stevens, noted that an invention can actually be patented before it is reduced to practice, because the "invention" occurs when the inventor has a fully formed idea of how the invention will be made. Pfaff could have patented his idea based on the drawings that he had shown to Texas Instruments, because they were complete enough to allow another engineer to build the invention from the designs.

Furthermore, if an invention could be sold before it was reduced to practice without any consequence, then inventors would be able to evade the time limits placed on the patent itself by simply delaying the construction of a working model. This would, in turn, delay new inventions from reaching the public, undermining the primary goal of the patent system, "[t]o promote the Progress of Science and useful Arts..."

Based on these considerations, the Court concluded that the "on sale" bar applies if two conditions are met:

1. That the product was the subject of a commercial offer for sale; and
2. That the product could have been patented at that time, either because it had in fact been reduced to practice, or because it was sufficiently well described for another person skilled in the art to build the invention from the designs.

Because these conditions were satisfied, the Court held that Pfaff's patent was invalid.

== See also ==
- List of United States Supreme Court cases, volume 525
- List of United States Supreme Court cases
- Lists of United States Supreme Court cases by volume
