= National Collegiate Athletic Association =

North American athletic organization

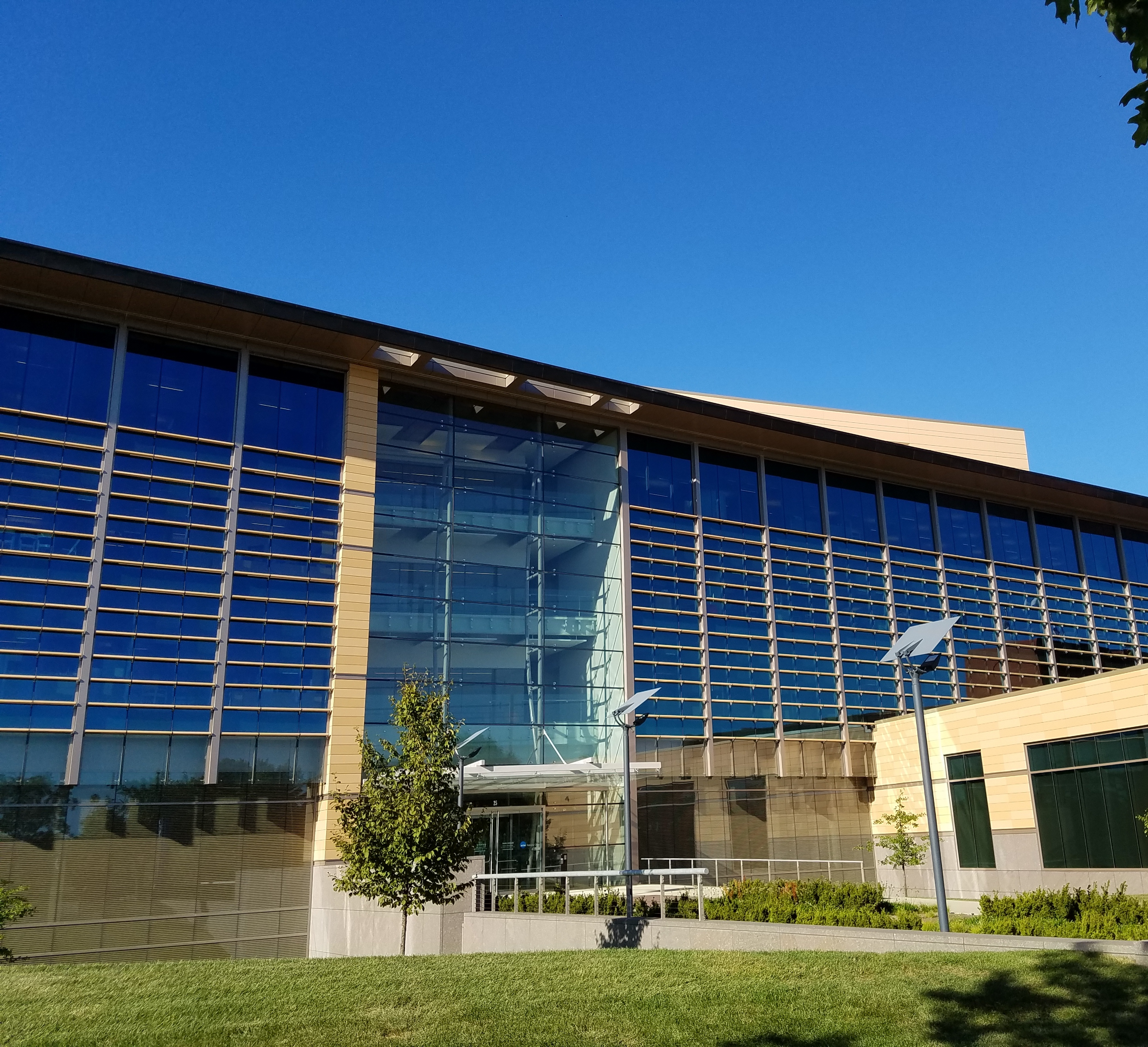
- NCAA's national office in Indianapolis
- Abbreviation: NCAA
- Founded: March 31, 1906; 120 years ago (Note: As "Intercollegiate Athletic Association of the United States" (IAAUS), renamed "National Collegiate Athletic Association" in 1910.)
- Founded at: Murray Hill Hotel
- Legal status: Association
- Headquarters: Indianapolis, Indiana, U.S.
- Region served: United States; Canada (one institution)
- Members: About 1,100 schools
- President: Charlie Baker
- Main organ: Board of Governors
- Website: ncaa.com; ncaa.org

The National Collegiate Athletic Association (NCAA) (Note: NCAA is commonly pronounced "N C double A" by the general public and in outside media reports, but generally pronounced one letter at a time, "N C A A", in the organization's official media. In its early decades, the pronunciation "N C two A" was also used – this variation is rarely used today.) is a nonprofit organization that regulates student athletics among about 1,100 schools in the United States, and 1 in Canada. It also organizes the athletic programs of colleges and helps over 500,000 college student athletes who compete annually in college sports. The headquarters is located in Indianapolis, Indiana.

Until the 1956–57 academic year, the NCAA was a single division for all schools. That year, the NCAA split into the University Division and the College Division. In August 1973, the current three-division system of Division I, Division II, and Division III was adopted by the NCAA membership in a special convention. Under NCAA rules, Division I and Division II schools can offer athletic scholarships to students. Division III schools may not offer any athletic scholarships. Generally, larger schools compete in Division I and smaller schools in II and III. Division I football was further divided into I-A and I-AA in 1978, while Division I programs that did not have football teams were known as I-AAA. In 2006, Divisions I-A and I-AA were, respectively, renamed the Football Bowl Subdivision (FBS) and Football Championship Subdivision (FCS). In its 2022–23 fiscal year, the NCAA generated $1.28 billion in revenue, $945 million (74%) of which came from airing rights to the Division I men's basketball tournament.

Controversially, the NCAA substantially restricts the kinds of benefits and compensation (including paid salary) that collegiate athletes could receive from their schools. The consensus among economists is these caps for men's basketball and football players benefit the athletes' schools (through rent-seeking) at the expense of the athletes. Economists have subsequently characterized the NCAA as a cartel. In 2021, the Supreme Court of the United States unanimously ruled that some of these NCAA restrictions on student athletes are in violation of US antitrust law. The NCAA settled a lawsuit in May 2024 allowing member institutions to pay Division I athletes who have played since 2016. However, the Protect College Sports Act, which passed by a bipartisan 77-22 vote in the Senate on September 28, 2026, grants the NCAA a limited antitrust exemption to enforce eligibility, transfer and NIL compensation rules, establish federal NIL compensation, eligibility and transfer rules, and regulate agent conduct. If the bill passes, it will grant a conditional antitrust exemption shielding NCAA, conferences, and institutions from federal and state antitrust liability when enforcing the Act's rules on compensation caps, eligibility, transfers, recruitments, and agent certification.

== History ==
=== Formation and early years ===
Intercollegiate sports began in the United States in 1852 when crews from Harvard and Yale universities met in a challenge race in the sport of rowing. As rowing remained the preeminent sport in the country into the late-1800s, many of the initial debates about collegiate athletic eligibility and purpose were settled through organizations like the Rowing Association of American Colleges and the Intercollegiate Rowing Association. As other sports emerged, notably football and basketball, many of these same concepts and standards were adopted. Football, in particular, began to emerge as a marquee sport, though its rules were in constant flux and often had to be adapted for each contest.

The NCAA dates its formation to two White House conferences convened by President Theodore Roosevelt in the early 20th century in response to repeated injuries and deaths in college football which had "prompted many college and universities to discontinue the sport." Following those White House meetings and the reforms which had resulted, Chancellor Henry MacCracken of New York University organized a meeting of 13 colleges and universities to initiate changes in football playing rules; at a follow-on meeting on December 28, 1905, at the Murray Hill Hotel in New York City, 62 higher-education institutions became charter members of the Intercollegiate Athletic Association of the United States (IAAUS). The IAAUS was officially established on March 31, 1906, and took its present name, the NCAA, in 1910.

For several years, the NCAA was a discussion group and rules-making body, but in 1921, the first NCAA national championship was conducted: the National Collegiate Track and Field Championships. (Note: The Inter-Varsity Athletics Board (IVAB) in England held its first inter-varsity track and field competition in 1919.) Gradually, more rules committees were formed and more championships were created, including a basketball championship in 1939.

A series of crises brought the NCAA to a crossroads after World War II. The "Sanity Code" – adopted to establish guidelines for recruiting and financial aid – failed to curb abuses, and the Association needed to find more effective ways to curtail its membership. Postseason football games were multiplying with little control, and member schools were increasingly concerned about how the new medium of television would affect football attendance.

The NCAA engaged in a bitter power struggle with the Amateur Athletic Union. The complexity of those problems and the growth in membership and championships demonstrated the need for full-time professional leadership.

Walter Byers, previously an assistant sports information director, was named executive director in 1951. The Harvard Crimson described Byers as "power-mad", The New York Times said that Byers was "secretive, despotic, stubborn and ruthless", The Washington Post described him as a dictator, and others described him as a "petty tyrant".

Byers wasted no time placing his stamp on the Association, and a national headquarters was established in Kansas City, Missouri, in 1952. A program to control live television of football games was approved, the annual Convention delegated enforcement powers to the Association's Council, and legislation was adopted governing postseason bowl games.

=== 1970s–1980s ===
The NCAA logo used from 1971 to 1979

As college athletics grew, the scope of the nation's athletics programs diverged, forcing the NCAA to create a structure that recognized varying levels of emphasis. In 1973, the association's membership was divided into three legislative and competitive divisions – I, II, and III. Five years later in 1978, Division I members voted to create subdivisions I-A and I-AA (renamed the Football Bowl Subdivision and the Football Championship Subdivision in 2006) in football.

Until the 1980s, the association did not govern women's athletics. Instead, the Association for Intercollegiate Athletics for Women (AIAW), with nearly 1,000 member schools, governed women's collegiate sports in the United States. The AIAW was in a vulnerable position that precipitated conflicts with the NCAA in the early-1980s. Following a one-year overlap in which both organizations staged women's championships, the AIAW discontinued operation, and most member schools continued their women's athletics programs under the governance of the NCAA. By 1982 all divisions of the NCAA offered national championship events for women's athletics. A year later in 1983, the 75th Convention approved an expansion to plan women's athletic program services and pushed for a women's championship program.

=== President's Commission ===
Proposals at every NCAA Convention are voted on by the institutional members of the NCAA. Each institutional member has one representative: the president/CEO or a representative designated by him/her. Attendance by the actual president/CEO was low; less than 30%. Southern Methodist University President A. Kenneth Pye commented, "In too many cases, presidents have not only delegated responsibility, they have abdicated it." Many presidents designated their athletic director as the institutional representative, something Pye compared to "entrusting a chicken coop to the supervision of a wolf and a fox." Beginning around 1980, a group of college presidents thought there was a crisis of integrity in collegiate sports and discussed ways to transform athletics to match the academic model. The American Council on Education (ACE) proposed a presidential board empowered to veto NCAA membership actions, while the NCAA Council, whose membership was mostly athletic officials, suggested a presidential commission with advisory powers. The council's proposal may have been intended to block the presidential effort to gain control of the NCAA. The two proposals were voted on by the membership at the NCAA Convention in January 1984. The ACE proposal was defeated by a vote of 313 to 328. The Council proposal passed on a voice vote without ballots. Publicly, the President's Commission (PC) was responsible for establishing an agenda for the NCAA, but the actual language of the proposal stated that their role was to be a presidential forum and to provide the NCAA with the president's position on major policy issues. The PC could study issues and urge action, call special meetings and sponsor legislation. Their one real power was to veto the selection of Executive Director. The composition of the commission was 22 CEOs from Division I and 11 CEOs each from Divisions II and III. The true intent of the PC was to shift control of intercollegiate athletics back to CEOs. Graduation rates were an important metric to chancellors and presidents and became a focus of the PC.

In June 1985 a special convention was held to review legislative proposals including academic integrity, academic-reporting requirements, differences in "major" and "secondary" violations including the "death penalty" and requiring an annual financial audit of athletic departments. All proposals passed overwhelmingly. Many presidents who did not attend sent a vice-president rather than their athletic director. University of Florida President Marshall Criser stated that "the ultimate responsibility must be assumed by the CEOs because we don't have enough NCAA cops to solve all of the problems."

The regular NCAA meeting in January 1986 presented proposals in regard to college eligibility, drug testing, and basketball competition limits. All passed but matters regarding acceptable academic progress, special-admissions and booster club activities were ignored. Many presidents did not attend and it appeared that athletic directors controlled the meeting. A survey of 138 Division I presidents indicated that athletic directors did control collegiate sports. Despite a moratorium on extending the season of any sport in 1985, the extension of basketball and hockey seasons were approved. Indiana University president John W. Ryan, outgoing chairman of the PC commented, "If the moratorium is vacated, it's being vacated not by the commission, but by this convention." Following the vote, a delegate was quoted, "A lot of Athletic Directors figure they've successfully waited out the presidents...unless the presidents fight back, NCAA reform is flat-ass dead in the water."

The PC proposed just one legislative issue at the January 1987 meeting: applying the minimum academic standards in Division I to Division II. It narrowly passed.

The PC attempted to again push the reform of college athletics by calling another special convention which was held in June 1987 to discuss cost-cutting measures and to address the overemphasis on athletics in colleges and universities. John Slaughter, Chancellor of the University of Maryland served as chairman. He stated, "This represents the second major thrust since our commission was formed three years ago. The first involved academics and infractions. This will be equally momentous and more sweeping. We want to achieve a balance between athletics and other institutional programs." Cost-cutting measures proposed included reductions in athletic financial aid, coaching staff sizes, and length of practice/playing seasons. A resolution was also floated that opposed coaches receiving outside financial compensation if outside activities interfere with regular duties. All the PC proposals were defeated, and two basketball scholarships were restored that were eliminated at the meeting in January. It was apparent that there was an open conflict between college presidents. The president of the Carnegie Foundation for the Advancement of Teaching, Ernest L. Boyer, summarized the situation: "There are presidents whose institutions are so deeply involved in athletics that their own institutional and personal futures hang in the balance. They feel they must resist such change because athletics are bigger than they are."

The PC sponsored no legislation at the January 1988 annual meeting, and there was not a vote of confidence.

However, a year later at the annual meeting, financial aid restrictions were proposed for specific Division I and II sports. Following extensive discussions, the measure was withdrawn and a Special Committee on Cost Reductions was formed to study the issue. Once again, a proposal from the PC was circumvented.

The President's Commission met in October 1989 to prepare for the 1990 NCAA annual meeting. Proposals were developed to shorten spring football and the basketball season; grant financial aid based on need to academically deficient athletes; and reporting of graduation rates. Chancellor Martin Massengale of the University of Nebraska–Lincoln was then chairman of the PC insisted that graduation rate data was needed to preclude "further need for federal legislation" that was being proposed by Representative Tom McMillen and Senator Bill Bradley (both former NCAA and NBA players). The proposals demonstrated that the PC was intent on regaining control of college athletics and the opposition was immediate. Commissioner of the Big Ten Conference Jim Delany responded, "They tend to want quick answers and you don't solve the complexities of intercollegiate athletics. Yes, presidents are involved, but the truth is, they really don't have time to be involved." Bo Schembechler, then University of Michigan head football coach and athletic director, was blunt, saying "Unfortunately, you're dealing with people who don't understand. We're trying to straddle the fence here because you still want me to put 100,000 (fans) in the stadium and the reason you want me to do it is because you're not going to help me financially at all." In 1990, he resigned his college jobs to become president of Major League Baseball's Detroit Tigers. Upon his departure, he predicted, "In the next five years, school presidents will completely confuse intercollegiate athletics directors, then they'll dump it back to athletics directors and say, 'You straighten this out.' About 2000, it may be back on track."

Presidential turnout for the January 1990 meeting was good and many who did not attend sent a delegate to vote for the PC. The graduation reporting proposal passed overwhelmingly, and the proposal for need-based non-athletic aid passed easily. The final proposal to shorten basketball and spring football generated fierce debate. There was a motion to defer the proposal for study that failed 383–363, but the many PC members relaxed, confident of victory. PC Chairman Massengale left the meeting for other business, but during lunch, council members began lobbying and twisting arms to change votes. When the session resumed, council members began criticizing the PC and quickly executed a parliamentary maneuver to refer the proposal to the NCAA Council. Many PC members were still at lunch when a roll call vote passed 170–150. University of Texas women's athletic director Donna Lopiano complained, "The President's Commission needs to do what it does best, and that is to macro-manage. Leave the micro-management to the various expert groups. We will bring back solutions." Numerous presidents were shocked, upset and angry, but the remaining PC members began their own lobbying and arm-twisting. An hour later, there was a sense that representatives who had voted against the direction of their respective presidents had reconsidered, and a motion was made to reconsider by Lattie F. Coor, president of Arizona State University. West Point Lieutenant General Dave Richard Palmer urged the vote, stating the NCAA needed "to make a mark on the wall...delay is the deadliest form of denial." Following discussion, compromise and voting on minor issues, the reconsideration motion passed, and the third proposal was adopted with a vote of 165–156.

The President's Commission held hearings beginning on May 9, 1991, to develop stronger academic standards.

The President's Commission lasted for 13 years and pushed through initiatives such as restricting the size of coaching staffs; limiting how much time student-athletes can spend on their sports; and setting more demanding academic standards for Divisions I and II. By the 1980s, televised college football had become a larger source of income for the NCAA. In September 1981, the Board of Regents of the University of Oklahoma and the University of Georgia Athletic Association filed suit against the NCAA in district court in Oklahoma. The plaintiffs stated that the NCAA's football television plan constituted price fixing, output restraints, boycott, and monopolizing, all of which were illegal under the Sherman Act. The NCAA argued that its pro-competitive and non-commercial justifications for the plan – protection of live gate, maintenance of competitive balance among NCAA member institutions, and the creation of a more attractive "product" to compete with other forms of entertainment – combined to make the plan reasonable. In September 1982, the district court found in favor of the plaintiffs, ruling that the plan violated antitrust laws. It enjoined the association from enforcing the contract. The NCAA appealed all the way to the United States Supreme Court, but lost in 1984 in a 7–2 ruling NCAA v. Board of Regents of the University of Oklahoma. (If the television contracts the NCAA had with ABC, CBS, and ESPN had remained in effect for the 1984 season, they would have generated some $73.6 million for the association and its members.)

=== Late 1990s ===
In 1999, the NCAA was sued for discriminating against female athletes under Title IX for systematically giving men in graduate school more waivers than a woman to participate in college sports. In National Collegiate Athletic Association v. Smith, 525 U.S. 459 (1999) the U.S. Supreme Court ruled that the NCAA was not subject to that law, without reviewing the merits of the discrimination claim.

Over the last two decades recruiting international athletes has become a growing trend among NCAA institutions. For example, most German athletes outside of Germany are based at US universities. For many European athletes, the American universities are the only option to pursue an academic and athletic career at the same time. Many of these students come to the US with high academic expectations and aspirations.

In 2009, Simon Fraser University in Burnaby, British Columbia, Canada, became the NCAA's first non-US member institution, joining Division II. In 2018, Division II membership approved allowing schools from Mexico to apply for membership; CETYS of Tijuana, Baja California expressed significant interest in joining at the time. However, Simon Fraser announced in 2025 that it had applied to return to Canada's national governing body of U Sports, and would leave the NCAA in 2027 if its application was accepted.

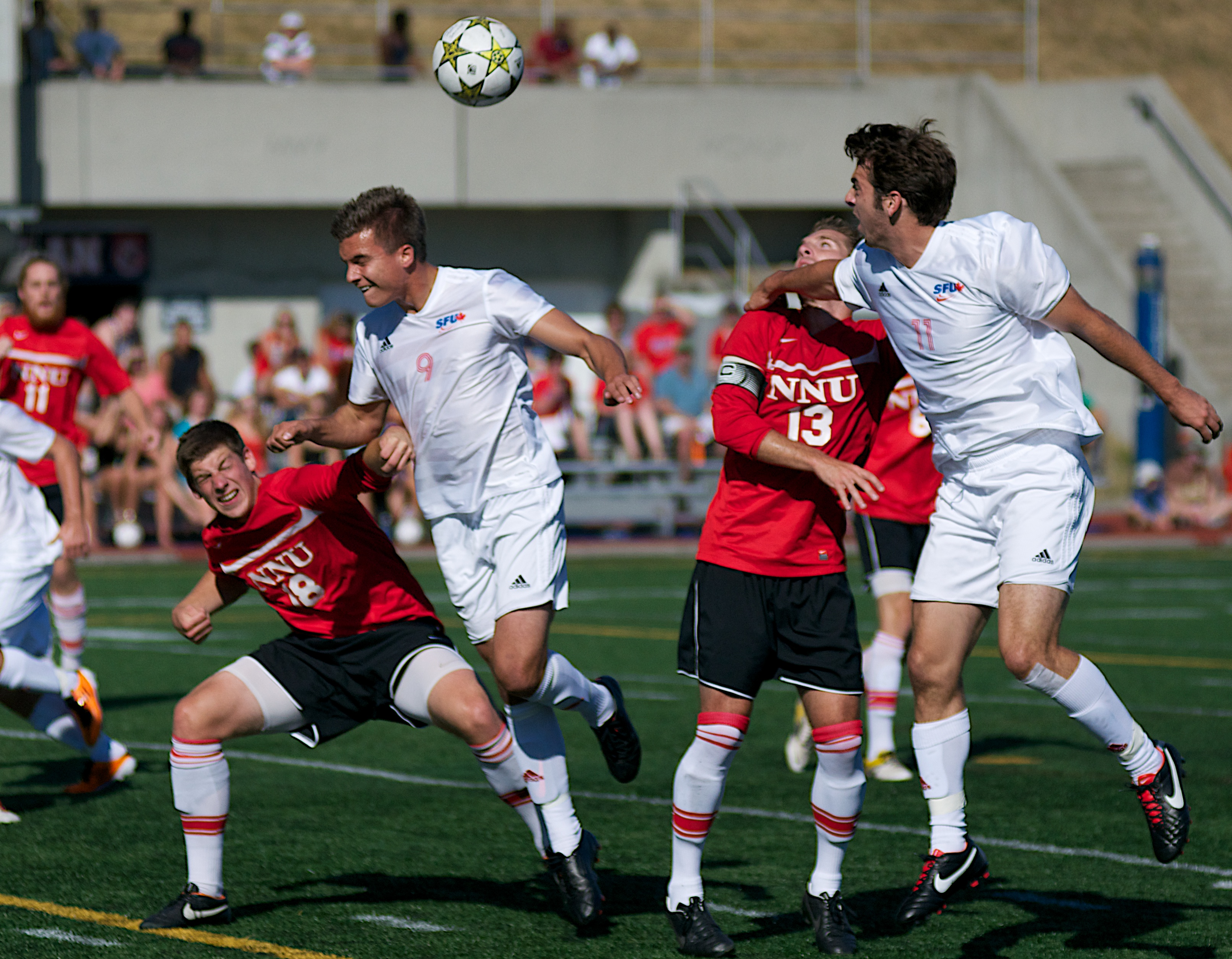
A men's soccer match between Canada's only NCAA school, Simon Fraser University, and Idaho's Northwest Nazarene University in 2012

In 2014, the NCAA set a record high of $989 million in net revenue. Just shy of $1 billion, it is among the highest of all large sports organizations.

During the NCAA's 2022 annual convention, the membership ratified a new version of the organization's constitution. The new constitution dramatically simplifies a rulebook that many college sports leaders saw as increasingly bloated.

It also reduced the size of the NCAA Board of Governors from 20 to 9, and guaranteed that current and former athletes have voting representation on both the NCAA board and the governing bodies of each NCAA division. The new constitution was the first step in a reorganization process in which each division will have the right to set its own rules, with no approval needed from the rest of the NCAA membership.

=== Notable court cases ===
- In the late-1940s, there were only two colleges in the country, Notre Dame and Pennsylvania, with national TV contracts, a considerable source of revenue. In 1951, the NCAA voted to prohibit any live TV broadcast of college football games during the season. No sooner had the NCAA voted to ban television than public outcry forced it to retreat. Instead, the NCAA voted to restrict the number of televised games for each team to stop the slide in gate attendance. University of Pennsylvania president Harold Stassen defied the monopoly and renewed its contract with ABC. Eventually, Penn dropped its suit when the NCAA, refusing Penn's request that the U.S. Attorney General rule on the legality of the NCAA's restrictive plan, threatened to expel the university from the association. Notre Dame continued televising its games through 1953, working around the ban by filming its games, then broadcasting them the next evening.
- In 1957, the Colorado Supreme Court dismissed a lawsuit filed by the family of deceased Trinidad College football player Ray Herbert Dennison. Despite suffering a lethal concussion injury on the field in a game versus Fort Lewis A&M College, Dennison was not entitled to any compensation because he was not under a contractual obligation to play football. Furthermore, the court stated that the "college did not receive a direct benefit from the activities, since the college was not in the football business and received no benefit from this field of recreation".
- In 1977, prompted partly by the Tarkanian Case, the US Congress initiated an investigation into the NCAA. It, combined with Tarkanian's case, forced the NCAA's internal files into the public record.
- In 1984, the U.S. Supreme Court ruled in NCAA v. Board of Regents of the University of Oklahoma that the NCAA's complete control of television rights violated the Sherman and Clayton Antitrust Acts, paving the way for schools and conferences to independently make deals with TV broadcasters directly.
- In 1998, the NCAA settled a $2.5 million lawsuit filed by former UNLV basketball coach, Jerry Tarkanian. Tarkanian sued the NCAA after he was forced to resign from UNLV, where he had been head coach from 1973 to 1992. The suit claimed the agency singled him out, penalizing the university's basketball program three times in that span. Tarkanian said, "They can never, ever, make up for all the pain and agony they caused me. All I can say is that for 25 years they beat the hell out of me". The NCAA said that it regretted the long battle and it now has more understanding of Tarkanian's position and that the case has changed the enforcement process for the better.
- In 1999, the NCAA was sued for discriminating against female athletes under Title IX for systematically giving men in graduate school more waivers than women to participate in college sports. In National Collegiate Athletic Association v. Smith, the U.S. Supreme Court ruled that the NCAA was not subject to that law, without reviewing the merits of the discrimination claim.
- In 2007, the case of White et al. v. NCAA, No. CV 06-999-RGK (C.D. Cal. September 20, 2006) was brought by former NCAA student-athletes Jason White, Brian Pollack, Jovan Harris, and Chris Craig as a class action lawsuit. They argued that the NCAA's current limits on a full scholarship or grant-in-aid was a violation of federal antitrust laws. Their reasoning was that in the absence of such a limit, NCAA member schools would be free to offer any financial aid packages they desired to recruit student athletes. The NCAA settled before a ruling by the court, by agreeing to set up the Former Student-Athlete Fund to "assist qualified candidates applying for receipt of career development expenses and/or reimbursement of educational expenses under the terms of the agreement with plaintiffs in a federal antitrust lawsuit."
- In 2013, Jay Bilas claimed that the NCAA was taking advantage of individual players through jersey sales in its store. Specifically, he typed the names of several top college football players, Tajh Boyd, Teddy Bridgewater, Jadeveon Clowney, Johnny Manziel, and A. J. McCarron, into the search engine of the NCAA's official online store. The search results returned corresponding numbered team jerseys. The NCAA subsequently removed the team jerseys listed on its site.
- In March 2014, four players filed a class action antitrust lawsuit (O'Bannon v. NCAA), alleging that the NCAA and its five dominant conferences are an "unlawful cartel". The suit charges that NCAA caps on the value of athletic scholarships have "illegally restricted the earning power of football and men's basketball players while making billions off their labor". Tulane University Sports Law Program Director Gabe Feldman called the suit "an instantly credible threat to the NCAA". On September 30, 2015, the U.S. Court of Appeals for the Ninth Circuit ruled that limiting compensation to the cost of an athlete's attendance at a university was sufficient. It simultaneously ruled against a federal judge's proposal to pay student athletes $5,000 per year in deferred compensation.
- In August 2015, the National Labor Relations Board reversed a decision settled in the prior year that classified members of Northwestern University's scholarship football players as employees, thus, granting them the right to collectively bargain for their rights. The unionization efforts were a direct effort led by the College Athletes Player Association and Kain Colter, who operated with the support of the United Steelworkers group. The case was ultimately struck down due to difficulties in applying the ruling across both public and private institutions. The NCAA made several improvements to the value of athletic scholarships and the quality of healthcare coverage in response to this movement by the Northwestern football players. These reforms included guaranteeing the entire four years of scholarship in the event of a career-ending injury, the implementation of "cost of attendance" stipends, the institution of "unlimited" athlete meal plans, and protections for the name, image, and likeness of athletes by third parties such as Electronic Arts.
- In 2018, former UCF kicker Donald De La Haye filed a lawsuit alleging that the university violated his First Amendment rights when it rescinded his full athletic scholarship over the income De La Haye made from his monetized YouTube channel, which he started before he attended college. UCF argued De La Haye violated the NCAA policy forbidding student-athletes from using their likenesses to make money. De La Haye ultimately settled with UCF so that he could obtain his degree from the university.
- In June 2021, the Supreme Court of the United States unanimously affirmed a ruling in NCAA v. Alston that provides for an incremental increase in how college athletes can be compensated. Justice Neil Gorsuch wrote the court's opinion, which upheld a district court judge's decision that the NCAA was violating antitrust law by placing limits on the education-related benefits that schools can provide to athletes. The decision allows schools to provide their athletes with unlimited compensation as long as it is some way connected to their education. The idea that college athletes should not be paid, a fundamental tenet of the 115-year-old NCAA, has faced increasing scrutiny in recent years. Federal antitrust lawsuits have slowly eroded strict amateurism rules during the past decade.

== Headquarters ==
The modern era of the NCAA began in July 1955 when its executive director, Kansas City, Missouri native Walter Byers, moved the organization's headquarters from the LaSalle Hotel in Chicago (where its offices were shared by the headquarters of the Big Ten Conference) to the Fairfax Building in Downtown Kansas City. The move was intended to separate the NCAA from the direct influence of any individual conference and keep it centrally located.

The Fairfax was a block from Municipal Auditorium which had hosted men's basketball Final Four games in 1940, 1941, and 1942. After Byers moved the headquarters to Kansas City, the championships would be held in Municipal Auditorium in 1953, 1954, 1955, 1957, 1961, and 1964. The Fairfax office consisted of three rooms with no air conditioning. Byers' staff consisted of four people: an assistant, two secretaries, and a bookkeeper.

In 1964, the NCAA moved three blocks away to offices in the Midland Theatre, moving again in 1973 to a $1.2 million building on 3.4 acres (14,000 m^{2}) on Shawnee Mission Parkway in suburban Mission, Kansas. In 1989, the organization moved 6 miles (9.7 km) farther south to Overland Park, Kansas. The new building was on 11.35 acres (45,900 m^{2}) and had 130,000 square feet (12,000 m^{2}) of space.

The NCAA was dissatisfied with its Johnson County, Kansas suburban location, noting that its location on the southern edges of the Kansas City suburbs was more than 40 minutes from Kansas City International Airport. They also noted that the suburban location was not drawing visitors to its new visitors' center.

In 1997, it asked for bids for a new headquarters. Various cities competed for a new headquarters with the two finalists being Kansas City and Indianapolis. Kansas City proposed to relocate the NCAA back downtown near the Crown Center complex and would locate the visitors' center in Union Station. However, Kansas City's main sports venue at the time, Kemper Arena, was nearly 23 years old. Indianapolis argued that it was in fact more central than Kansas City in that two-thirds of the members are east of the Mississippi River. The 50,000-seat RCA Dome (since replaced by the larger Lucas Oil Stadium) far eclipsed 19,500-seat Kemper Arena. In 1999, the NCAA moved its 300-member staff to its new headquarters in the White River State Park in a four-story 140,000-square-foot (13,000 m^{2}) facility on the west edge of downtown Indianapolis, Indiana. Adjacent to the headquarters is the 35,000-square-foot (3,300 m^{2}) NCAA Hall of Champions.

== Structure ==
The NCAA's Board of Governors (formerly known as the Executive Committee) is the main body within the NCAA. This body elects the NCAA's president.

The NCAA's legislative structure is broken down into cabinets and committees, consisting of various representatives of its member schools. These may be broken down further into sub-committees. The legislation is then passed on to the Management Council, which oversees all the cabinets and committees, and also includes representatives from the schools, such as athletic directors and faculty advisers. Management Council legislation goes on to the Board of Directors, which consists of school presidents, for final approval. The NCAA national office staff provides support by acting as guides, liaisons, researchers, and by managing public and media relations.

The NCAA runs the officiating software company ArbiterSports, based in Sandy, Utah, a joint venture between two subsidiaries of the NCAA, Arbiter LLC and eOfficials LLC. The NCAA's stated objective for the venture is to help improve the fairness, quality, and consistency of officiating across amateur athletics.

=== Presidents of the NCAA ===
The NCAA had no full-time administrator until 1951, when Walter Byers was appointed executive director. In 1998, the title was changed to president.

- Walter Byers 1951–1988 (Executive Director)
- James Frank 1981–1983 (Executive Director)
- Wilford Bailey 1987–88
- Dick Schultz 1988–1993
- Judith Sweet 1991–1993
- Cedric Dempsey 1994–2002
- Myles Brand 2003–2009
- Jim Isch 2009–2010 (interim)
- Mark Emmert 2010–2023
- Charlie Baker 2023–present

=== Chief medical officer ===
In 2013, the NCAA hired Brian Hainline as its first chief medical officer.

=== Division history ===
Before 1957, all NCAA sports used a single division of competition. In 1957 the NCAA split into two divisions for men's basketball only, with major programs making up the University Division and smaller programs making up the College Division. The names could be confusing, as some schools with "University" in their name still competed in the College Division while some with "College" in their name competed in the University Division. The split gradually took hold in other sports as well. Records from before the split were inherited by the University Division.

In 1973 the College Division split up between teams that wanted to grant athletic scholarships (becoming Division II, which inherited the College Division's records and history) and teams that did not (becoming Division III), and the University Division was renamed to Division I. Division I split into two subdivisions for football only in 1978 (though both still under the Division I name), with Division I-A consisting of major teams who would continue to compete in bowl games and use various polls to decide its champion and Division I-AA consisting of smaller teams who would compete in the new NCAA Football Tournament to decide its champion. Division I schools without football teams were known as Division I-AAA. In 2006, Division I-A became the Football Bowl Subdivision (FBS), Division I-AA became the Football Championship Subdivision (FCS), and Division I-AAA became Division I non-football. The changes were in name only with no significant structural differences to the organization.

Years	Division				
1906–1956	None				
1956–1973	University Division (Major Colleges)			College Division (Small Colleges)	
1973–present	Division I			Division II	Division III
1978–2006	Division I-A (football only)	Division I-AA (football only)	Division I-AAA	Division II	Division III
2006–present	Division I FBS (football only)	Division I FCS (football only)	Division I (non-football)	Division II	Division III

==== "National Collegiate" sports ====
For some less-popular sports, the NCAA does not separate teams into their usual divisions and instead holds only one tournament to decide a single national champion between all three divisions (except for women's ice hockey and men's indoor volleyball, where the National Collegiate championship only features teams from Division I and Division II and a separate championship is contested for only Division III). The 15 sports which use the National Collegiate format, also called the single-division format, are women's acrobatics & tumbling, women's bowling, men's fencing, women's fencing, men's gymnastics, women's gymnastics, women's ice hockey, rifle, skiing, women's stunt, men's indoor volleyball, women's beach volleyball, men's water polo, women's water polo, and women's wrestling. The newest such sports are the all-female sports of acrobatics & tumbling and stunt, the latter a cheerleading discipline, which will hold their first NCAA championships using this format in 2026–27. Women's wrestling held its first NCAA championship in the 2025–26 school year.

The NCAA considers a National Collegiate title equivalent to a Division I title even if the champion is primarily a member of Division II or III. These championships are largely dominated by teams that are otherwise members of Division I, but current non-Division I teams have won 41 National Collegiate championships since the University Division/College Division split as of March 2026 (2 in bowling, 20 in fencing, 8 in women's ice hockey, 10 in rifle, and 1 in women's wrestling). Division III schools are allowed to grant athletic scholarships to students who compete in National Collegiate sports, though most do not.

Men's ice hockey uses a similar but not identical "National Collegiate" format as women's ice hockey and men's indoor volleyball (Division III has its own championship but several Division III teams compete in Division I for men's ice hockey), but its top-level championship is branded as a "Division I" championship. While the NCAA has not explained why it is the only sport with this distinction, the NCAA held a separate Division II championship from 1978 to 1984 and again from 1993 to 1999. As of 2026, 12 Division I men's ice hockey championships have been won by current non-Division I teams since the University Division/College Division split. Like with National Collegiate sports, schools that are otherwise members of Division III who compete in Division I for men's ice hockey are allowed to grant athletic scholarships for the sport.

All sports used the National Collegiate format until 1957, when the NCAA was split into the University Division and College Division (which itself was split into Divisions II and III in 1973). The only sport that immediately saw a change after the 1957 split was men's basketball; (Note: At the time, the championship was known as the "NCAA Basketball Championship" rather than the "NCAA Men's Basketball Championship", as the NCAA did not sanction any women's sports until 1981.) all other sports continued to use the National Collegiate format for at least one season, and usually many more. Some sports that began after the split once used the format and no longer do. This include men's and women's lacrosse, women's rowing, women's soccer, and men's and women's indoor track & field.

Some sports, including men's and women's golf, men's ice hockey, men's lacrosse, and men's and women's soccer used to have a combined championship between Divisions II and III, but these were known as a "Division II/III championship" in most cases. The NCAA considered these titles equivalent to a Division II title. No sport currently uses this format.

== Player eligibility ==
The NCAA requires all of its athletes to be amateurs. All incoming athletes must be certified as amateurs. To remain eligible, athletes must not sign contract with sports clubs, earn a salary playing a sport, try out for professional sports, or enter into agreements with agents.

To participate in college athletics in their freshman year, the NCAA requires that students meet three criteria: having graduated from high school, be completing the minimum required academic courses, and having qualifying grade-point average (GPA).

The 16 academic credits are four courses in English, two courses in math, two classes in social science, two in natural or physical science, and one additional course in English, math, natural or physical science, or another academic course such as a foreign language.

To meet the Division I requirements for grade point average, the lowest possible high school GPA a student may have to be eligible with to play in their freshman year is a 2.30 (2.20 for Division II or III), but they are allowed to play beginning in their second year with a GPA of 2.00.

As of the 2017–18 school year, a high school student may sign a letter of intent to enter and play football for a Division I or Division II college in either of two periods. (Note: The NCAA prohibits Division III members from using the National Letter of Intent program, or requiring that prospective athletes sign any pre-enrollment document that is not executed by other prospective students at that institution. The NCAA does allow the signing of a standard, non-binding celebratory form upon the student's acceptance of enrollment, but this signing cannot take place at the institution's campus, and staff members of that school cannot be present at the signing.) The first, introduced in 2017–18, is a three-day period in mid-December, coinciding with the first three days of the previously existing signing period for junior college players. The second period, which before 2017 was the only one allowed for signings of high school players, starts on the first Wednesday in February. In August 2011, the NCAA announced plans to raise academic requirements for postseason competition, including its two most prominent competitions, football's now-defunct Bowl Championship Series (replaced in 2014 by the College Football Playoff) and the Division I men's basketball tournament; the new requirement, which are based on an "Academic Progress Rate" (APR) that measures retention and graduation rates, and is calculated on a four-year, rolling basis. The changes raise the rate from 900 to 930, which represents a 50% graduation rate.

Student-athletes can accept prize money from tournaments or competitions if they do not exceed the total expenses from the event. For example, during high school, D1 tennis players may take up to $10,000 in total prize money. If the student surpassed the amount of $10,000 of prize money in a calendar year, they would lose eligibility.

Students are only allowed to compete athletically for four years. Athletes are allowed to sit out a year while still attending school but not lose a year of eligibility by redshirting. In other words, a student has five years from the time they begin college to play four seasons before getting drafted to any professional sports teams.

== NCAA sponsored sports ==
The NCAA currently awards 94 national team championships yearly – 49 women's, 43 men's, and 2 coed championships for rifle and skiing. Sports sanctioned by the NCAA include the following: acrobatics & tumbling (women), basketball, baseball (men), track and field, softball (women), football (men), cross country, field hockey (women), bowling (women), golf, fencing, lacrosse, soccer, gymnastics, rowing (women), stunt (women), swimming & diving, beach volleyball (women), volleyball, ice hockey, water polo, rifle (coeducational), tennis, skiing (coeducational), and wrestling.

The newest sports to be officially sanctioned are acrobatics & tumbling and the cheerleading discipline of stunt, all-female sports which will hold their first official championships in spring 2027. Before then, the last sport to have been officially sanctioned was women's wrestling, which held its first championship in March 2026, preceded by beach volleyball, which held its first championship in spring 2016. The NCAA had called that sport "sand volleyball" until June 23, 2015, when it announced that it would use the internationally recognized name of "beach volleyball".

The Division I Council, acting on a recommendation from the NCAA Sports Oversight Committee, voted in June 2025 to separate men's and women's scoring in the fencing championship, which would effectively establish separate men's and women's championships in that sport. Because fencing is a National Collegiate sport with a single championship event for all divisions, Divisions II and III had to separately approve this change. The other divisions approved this change the following month.

In the 2027–28 school year, separate divisional championships will be established in two women's sports—Division II bowling and Division III wrestling.

The Football Bowl Subdivision of Division I determines its own champion separately from the NCAA via the College Football Playoff; this is not an official NCAA championship (see below).

The NCAA awards championships in the sports listed below. For the two coeducational championships, women's dates reflect the first championship that was open to women.

NCAA sports
Division I (M)	Division II (M)	Division III (M)	Sport	Division I (W)	Division II (W)	Division III (W)
			Acrobatics & tumbling	2027–		
1947–	1968–	1976–	Baseball			
1939–	1957–	1975–	Basketball	1982–	1982–	1982–
			Bowling	2004–	2028–	2004–
1938–	1958–	1973–	Cross country	1981–	1981–	1981–
1941–			Fencing (Note: Separate men's and women's team championships were held between 1982 and 1989, and resumed in 2026. From 1990–2025, a single coeducational team championship was held. Individual bouts have always involved members of the same sex, even in the championship's coeducational era.)	1982–		
			Field hockey	1981–	1981–	1981–
1978– (FCS)	1973–	1973–	Football			
1939–	1963–	1975–	Golf	1982–	1996–99; 2000–	1996–99; 2000–
1938–	1968–84		Gymnastics	1982–	1982–86	
1948–	1978–84; 1993–99	1984–	Ice hockey	2001–		2002–
1971–	1974–79; 1980–81; 1993–	1974–79; 1980–	Lacrosse	1982–	2001–	1985–
1980–			Rifle (Note: Men and women compete together in this sport as equals, making this the only NCAA sport in which men and women directly compete against one another..)	1980– (Note: Rifle was the only NCAA sport whose championship was open to women before the 1981–82 school year.)		
			Rowing	1997–	2002–	2002–
1954–			Skiing (Note: Men and women compete together as team members in this sport, but all races involve members of only one sex.)	1983–		
1954–	1972–	1974–	Soccer	1982–	1988–	1986–
			Softball	1982–	1982–	1982–
			Stunt	2027–		
1924–	1964–	1975–	Swimming & Diving	1982–	1982–	1982–
1946–	1963–	1976–	Tennis	1982–	1982–	1982–
1965–	1985–	1985–	Track & field (indoor)	1983–	1985; 1987–	1985; 1987–
1921–	1963–	1974–	Track & field (outdoor)	1982–	1982–	1982–
1970–		2012–	Volleyball (indoor)	1981–	1981–	1981–
			Volleyball (beach)	2016–		
1969–			Water polo	2001–		
1928–	1963–	1974–	Wrestling	2026–		2028–

- Through the 2026–27 school year, Division II schools will continue to compete for the National Collegiate bowling championship, and Division III schools will continue to compete for the National Collegiate women's wrestling championship.
- In addition to the sports above, the NCAA sanctioned a boxing championship from 1932 to 1960. The NCAA discontinued boxing following declines in the sport during the 1950s and following the death of a boxer at the 1960 NCAA tournament.
- The NCAA also formerly sanctioned a trampoline championship. Prior to 1969, it was one of the events in the men's gymnastics championship, but it was given its own championship in 1969 and 1970 before being dropped completely.

The number of teams (school programs) that compete in each sport in their respective division as of the 2021–22 academic year are as follows:

=== Men's programs ===
Sport	Division I	Division II	Division III
Baseball	293	257	391
Basketball	350	306	422
Cross Country	315	277	397
Fencing (Note: Coed Championship sport)	20	2	11
Football	253	169	242
Golf	292	214	297
Gymnastics	12	0	1
Ice Hockey	57	8	84
Lacrosse	72	75	247
Rifle	17	2	2
Skiing	10	6	16
Soccer	202	205	417
Swimming and Diving	130	77	241
Tennis	233	152	311
Track and Field (Indoor)	264	182	302
Track and Field (Outdoor)	287	227	331
Volleyball	25	32	113
Water Polo	25	9	16
Wrestling	76	67	116

=== Women's programs ===
Sport	Division I	Division II	Division III
Basketball	348	306	435
Beach Volleyball	62	17	6
Bowling	34	34	23
Cross Country	347	297	417
Fencing	27	2	15
Field Hockey	77	36	169
Golf	262	198	236
Gymnastics	61	5	15
Ice Hockey	34	6	72
Lacrosse	119	113	290
Rifle	22	2	2
Rowing	87	15	44
Skiing	10	7	15
Soccer	335	262	435
Softball	293	284	408
Swimming and Diving	190	104	269
Tennis	300	209	350
Track and Field (Indoor)	331	206	307
Track and Field (Outdoor)	339	258	342
Volleyball	332	296	430
Water Polo	34	12	19

=== Emerging sports for women ===
In addition to the above sports, the NCAA recognizes Emerging Sports for Women. These sports have roster (Division I) and scholarship (Division II) limitations for each sport, but do not currently have officially sanctioned NCAA championships. A member institution may use these sports to meet the required level of sports sponsorship for its division. An "Emerging Sport" must gain championship status (minimum 40 varsity programs for Division I team sports, 35 for Division II, 28 for Division III) within 10 years, or show steady progress toward that goal to remain on the list. Until then, it is under the auspices of the NCAA and its respective institutions. Emerging Sport status allows for competition to include club teams to satisfy the minimum number of competitions bylaw established by the NCAA.

The four sports currently designated as Emerging Sports for Women are:

- Equestrian (in Divisions I and II only)
- Flag football
- Rugby
- Triathlon

Wrestling was removed from the Emerging Sports program in January 2025 when it became an official championship sport, with the first season taking place in 2025–26. Similarly, acrobatics & tumbling and stunt were removed from the program in January 2026, with the first seasons to take place in 2026–27.

The newest Emerging Sport is flag football, added to the program in January 2026 with the first season under "emerging" status in spring 2026.

== Sports added and dropped ==
The popularity of each of these sports programs has changed over time. Between 1988–89 and 2010–11, NCAA schools had net additions of 510 men's teams and 2,703 women's teams.

The following tables show the changes over time in the number of NCAA schools across all three divisions combined sponsoring each of the men's and women's team sports.

=== Men's sports ===
The men's sports with the biggest net gains during the 1988–89 to 2010–11 period were indoor track and field, lacrosse, and cross country (each with more than 100 net gains). The men's sports with the biggest losses were wrestling (−104 teams), tennis, and rifle; the men's team sport with the most net losses was water polo. Other reports show that 355 college wrestling programs have been eliminated since 2000; 212 men's gymnastics programs have been eliminated since 1969 with only 17 programs remaining as of 2013.

Additionally, eight NCAA sports—all men's sports—were sponsored by fewer Division I schools in 2020 than in 1990, despite the D-I membership having increased by nearly 60 schools during that period. Four of these sports, namely wrestling, swimming & diving, gymnastics, and tennis, lost more than 20 net teams during that timeframe. As a proportion of D-I membership, men's tennis took the greatest hit; 71.5% of D-I members had men's tennis in 2020, compared to 93.2% in 1990.

Men's Team Sports: Number of Schools Sponsoring
No.	Sport	1981–82	2021–22	Change	Percent
1	Basketball	741	1,077	+336	+45%
2	Baseball	642	943	+301	+47%
3	Soccer	521	826	+305	+59%
4	Football	497	666	+169	+34%
5	Lacrosse	138	395	+257	+186%
6	Volleyball	63	173	+110	+175%
7	Ice hockey	130	151	+22	+17%
8	Water polo	49	51	+2	+4%

The following table lists the men's individual DI sports with at least 5,000 participating athletes. Sports are ranked by number of athletes.

Men's individual sports: Number of Schools Sponsoring
No.	Sport	1981-82	2021-22	Change	Percent	Athletes
1	Track (outdoor)	577	864	+287	+50%	31,278
2	Track (indoor)	422	772	+350	+83%	28,537
3	Cross country	650	992	+342	+53%	14,787
4	Swimming & diving	377	449	+72	+19%	9,945
5	Golf	590	809	+219	+37%	8,602
6	Wrestling	363	267	-96	-26%	8,309
7	Tennis	690	701	+11	+1%	7,549
8	Gymnastics	79	15	-64	-81%	304

=== Women's sports ===
The women's sports with the biggest net gains during the 1988–89 to 2010–11 period were soccer (+599 teams), golf, and indoor track and field; no women's sports programs experienced double-digit net losses.

Women's Team Sports: Number of Schools Sponsoring
No.	Sport	1981–82	2022–23	Change	Percent
1	Basketball	705	1,087	+382	+54%
2	Volleyball	603	1,058	+455	+75%
3	Soccer	80	1,035	+955	+1193%
4	Softball	348	986	+638	+183%
5	Lacrosse	105	522	+271	+258%
6	Field hockey	268	286	+18	+7%
7	Rowing	17	146	+129	+759%
8	Ice hockey	17	113	+96	+564%
9	Bowling	5*	99	+94	+1880%
10	Beach volleyball	14*	91	+77	+550%
11	Water polo	46*	66	+20	+43%
12	Acrobatics and tumbling	27*	37	+10	+37%
13	Triathlon	4*	34	+30	+750%
14	Rugby	2*	29	+27	+1350%
15	Stunt	2*	2	-	-

- Acrobatics and tumbling was not a women's varsity sport in 1982 and the NCAA report does not include the number of teams for that year. Bowling is first listed in the NCAA report in 2020–21 with 27 teams, and so the number of teams for that season is listed in the table above.
- Bowling was not a women's varsity sport in 1982 and the NCAA report does not include the number of teams for that year. Bowling is first listed in the NCAA report in 1998–99 with 5 teams, and so the number of teams for that season is listed in the table above.
- Beach volleyball was not a women's varsity sport in 1982 and the NCAA report does not include the number of teams for that year. Beach volleyball is first listed in the NCAA report in 2011–12 with 14 teams, and so the number of teams for that season is listed in the table above.
- Rugby was not a women's varsity sport in 1982 and the NCAA report does not include the number of teams for that year. Rugby is first listed in the NCAA report in 2002–03 with 2 teams, and so the number of teams for that season is listed in the table above.
- Stunt was not a women's varsity sport in 1982 and the NCAA report does not include the number of teams for that year. Stunt is first listed in the NCAA report in 2022–23 with 2 teams, and so the number of teams for that season is listed in the table above.
- Triathlon was not a women's varsity sport in 1982 and the NCAA report does not include the number of teams for that year. Triathlon is first listed in the NCAA report in 2015–16 with 4 teams, and so the number of teams for that season is listed in the table above.
- Water polo was not a women's varsity sport in 1982 and the NCAA report does not include the number of teams for that year. Water polo is first listed in the NCAA report in 2000–01 with 46 teams, and so the number of teams for that season is listed in the table above.

The following table lists the women's individual NCAA sports with at least 1,000 participating athletes. Sports are ranked by number of athletes.

Women's individual sports
No.	Sport	1981-82	2021-22	Change	Percent	Athletes
1	Track (outdoor)	427	957	+530	+124%	31,475
2	Track (indoor)	239	870	+631	+264%	29,391
3	Cross country	417	1,056	+639	+153%	14,621
4	Swimming & diving	348	560	+212	+61%	13,259
5	Tennis	610	858	+248	+41%	8,343
6	Golf	125	704	+579	+463%	5,733
7	Gymnastics	179	83	-96	-54%	1,715
8	Equestrian	41*	48	+7	+17%	1,443
9	Wrestling	4*	51	+47	+1175%	769

- Equestrian was not a women's varsity sport in 1982 and the NCAA report does not include the number of teams for that year. Equestrian is first listed in the NCAA report in 1988–89 with 41 teams, and so the number of teams for that season is listed in the table above.
- Wrestling was not a women's varsity sport in 1982 and the NCAA report does not include the number of teams for that year. Wrestling is first listed in the NCAA report in 2016–17 with 4 teams, and so the number of teams for that season is listed in the table above.

== Championships ==
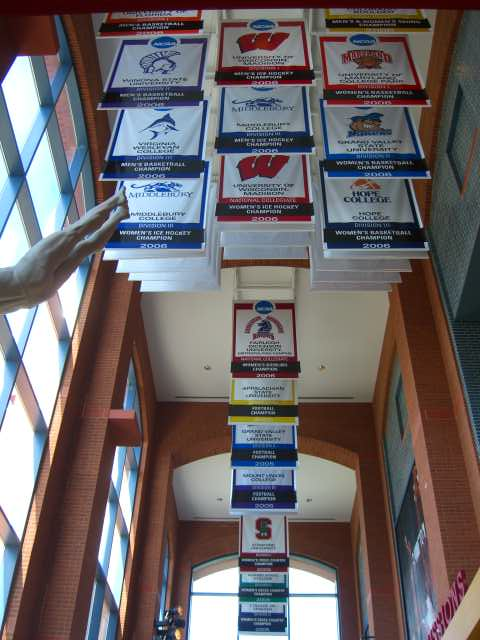
2006 NCAA championship banners hang from the ceiling of the NCAA Hall of Champions in Indianapolis

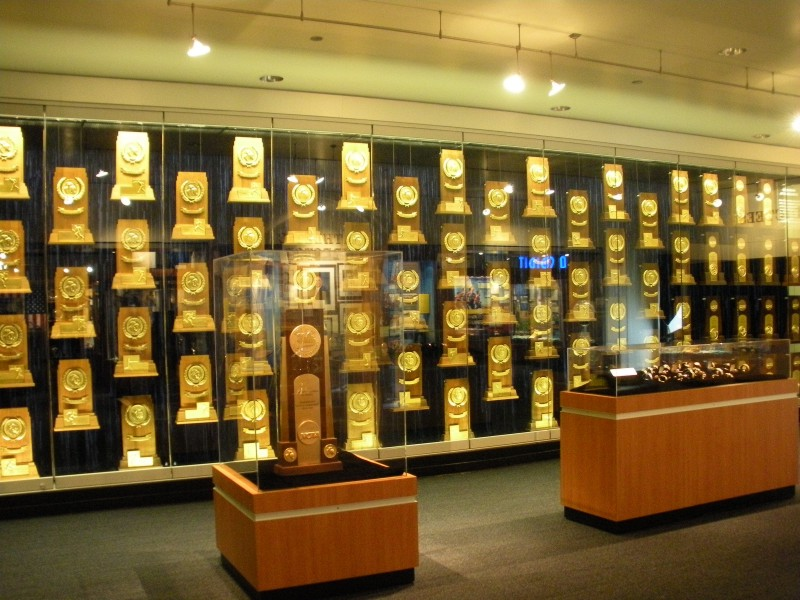
NCAA national championship trophies, rings, and watches won by UCLA teams

=== Trophies ===
For every NCAA sanctioned sport other than Division I FBS football, the NCAA awards trophies with gold, silver, and bronze plating for the first-, second-, and third-place teams, respectively. In the case of the NCAA basketball tournaments, both semifinalists who did not make the championship game receive bronze plated trophies for third place (prior to 1982 the teams played a "consolation" game to determine third place). Similar trophies are awarded to both semifinalists in the NCAA football tournaments (which are conducted in Division I FCS and both lower divisions), which have never had a third-place game. Winning teams maintain permanent possession of these trophies unless it is later found that they were won via serious rules violations.

Starting with the 2001–02 season, and again in the 2007–08 season, the trophies were changed. Starting in the 2006 basketball season, teams that make the Final Four in the Division I tournament receive bronze-plated "regional championship" trophies upon winning their Regional Championship which state the region they won and have the Final Four logo. The teams that make the National Championship game receive an additional trophy that is gold-plated for the winner. Starting in the mid-1990s, the National Champions in men's and women's basketball receive an elaborate trophy with a black marble base and crystal "neck" with a removable crystal basketball following the presentation of the standard NCAA Championship trophy.

As of May 30, 2022, Stanford, UCLA, and Southern California (USC) have the most NCAA championships. Stanford has won 131 and UCLA has won 119 NCAA team championships in men's and women's sports, while USC is third with 111.

=== Football Bowl Subdivision ===
The NCAA has never sanctioned an official championship for its highest level of football, now known as Division I FBS. Instead, several outside bodies award their own titles. The NCAA does not hold a championship tournament or game for Division I FBS football. In the past, teams that placed first in any of a number of season-ending media polls, most notable the AP Poll of writers and the Coaches Poll, were said to have won the "national championship".

From 2014 through 2023, the College Football Playoff – a consortium of the conferences and independent schools that compete in Division I FBS and six bowl games – has arranged to place the top four teams (based on a thirteen-member committee that selects and seeds the teams) into two semifinal games, with the winners advancing to compete in the College Football Playoff National Championship, which is not officially sanctioned or recognized by the NCAA. The winner of the game receives a trophy; since the NCAA awards no national championship for Division I FBS football, this trophy does not denote NCAA as other NCAA college sports national championship trophies do. The playoff expanded to 12 teams starting in 2024.

=== Current champions ===
Current NCAA Champions
Division I (M)	Division II (M)	Division III (M)	Sport	Division I (W)	Division II (W)	Division III (W)
			Acrobatics & tumbling	First championship in 2027		
Oklahoma	Tampa	Denison	Baseball (2026)			
Michigan	Gannon	Mary Washington	Basketball (2026)	UCLA	Grand Valley State	Denison
			Bowling (2026)	Jacksonville State; First Division II championship in 2028		
Oklahoma State	Wingate	Wisconsin-La Crosse	Cross country (2025)	NC State	Grand Valley State	NYU
Notre Dame			Fencing (2026)	Notre Dame		
			Field hockey (2025)	Northwestern	Shippensburg	Tufts
Indiana (FBS)+	Ferris State	Wisconsin–River Falls	Football (2025)			
Montana State (FCS)+	Ferris State	Wisconsin–River Falls	Football (2025)			
Auburn	Florida Southern	Claremont-Mudd-Scripps	Golf (2026)	Stanford	Dallas Baptist	Emory
Stanford			Gymnastics (2026)	Oklahoma		
Denver		Hamilton	Ice hockey (2026)	Wisconsin		Wisconsin-River Falls
Princeton	Tampa	Tufts	Lacrosse (2026)	Northwestern	Florida Southern	Middlebury
West Virginia			Rifle (2026)	West Virginia		
			Rowing (2026)	Texas	Western Washington	Tufts
Utah			Skiing (Note: Men and women compete together as team members in this sport, but all races involve members of only one sex.) (2026)	Utah		
Washington	Midwestern State	Tufts	Soccer (2025)	Florida State	Florida Tech	Washington (MO)
			Softball (2026)	Texas	Saint Leo	Redlands
			Stunt	First championship in 2027		
Texas	Tampa	Denison	Swimming & diving (2026)	Virginia	Nova Southeastern	NYU
Virginia	Flagler	Chicago	Tennis (2026)	Texas A&M	Nova Southeastern	Wesleyan (CT)
Arkansas	Pittsburg State	Rowan	Track & field (indoor) (2026)	Georgia	Pittsburg State	Washington (MO)
Arkansas	Grand Valley State	Wisconsin-La Crosse	Track & field (outdoor) (2026)	Georgia	West Texas A&M	Wisconsin-La Crosse
Hawaii		Springfield (MA)	Volleyball (indoor) (2025)	Texas A&M	MSU Denver	Wisconsin–Oshkosh
			Volleyball (beach) (2026)	UCLA		
UCLA			Water polo (2025)	Stanford		
Penn State	Nebraska-Kearney	Wartburg	Wrestling (2026)	McKendree; First Division III championship in 2028		

+: The Division I FCS National Championship is the official NCAA-sanctioned football championship for Division I. The NCAA doesn't officially endorse a national champion at the Division I FBS level but maintains a list of "official selectors" in its record books.

== Conferences ==
The NCAA is divided into three levels of conferences, Division I, Division II, and Division III, organized in declining program size, as well as numerous sub-divisions. Most schools belong to a primary "multisport conference" for most of their sports. Schools may belong to different conferences for different sports.

The Division I, Division II, and Division III "Independents" listed below are not conferences per se; it is a designation used for schools that do not belong to a conference for a particular sport. These schools may still have conference memberships for other sports. For example, Notre Dame primarily belongs to the Atlantic Coast Conference for most sports, but its ice hockey team competes in the Big Ten Conference and its football team is an independent.

=== Division I ===
Among the NCAA regulations, each Division I conference defined as a "multisport conference" must have at least seven active Division I member institutions. These conferences must sponsor at least 12 sports, including six sports for men and six for women. At least seven active members in a multisport conference must sponsor both men's and women's basketball. However, a conference may operate for up to 2 years with fewer active members under a hardship rule. For non-football conferences, they must sponsor at least two men's team sports other than basketball. Teams that consist of both men and women are counted as men's teams for sports sponsorship purposes.

For all institutions in the Division I Football Bowl Subdivision, they have additional requirements. Among them, they must participate in conference play in at least six men's and eight women's sports, including football, men's and women's basketball, and at least two other women's team sports. In 2023, the NCAA added new requirements for FBS membership, set to take effect in 2027–28. At that time, FBS institutions must fund the equivalent of 210 full scholarships across all of their NCAA sports; must spend at least $6 million annually on said scholarships; and must provide at least 90% of the required number of full scholarships across 16 sports (as chosen by the institution), including football.

Notes
- FBS conferences in football are denoted with an asterisk (*)
- FCS conferences in football are denoted with two asterisks (**)
- Conferences that do not sponsor football or basketball are in italics

- America East Conference
- American Conference (American) *
- Atlantic 10 Conference (A-10)
- Atlantic Coast Conference (ACC) *
- Atlantic Sun Conference (ASUN)
- Big 12 Conference (Big 12) *
- Big East Conference
- Big Sky Conference **
- Big South Conference
- Big Ten Conference (Big Ten or B1G) *
- Big West Conference
- Coastal Athletic Association (CAA) (Note: Although the CAA football league is administered by the all-sports CAA, the two sides of the CAA are legally separate entities.)
- Conference USA (CUSA) *
- Horizon League
- Ivy League **
- Metro Conference (Note: Known before July 2026 as the Metro Atlantic Athletic Conference. Not to be confused with the 20th-century Metro Conference, a precursor to Conference USA.)
- Mid-American Conference (MAC)*
- Mid-Eastern Athletic Conference (MEAC) **
- Missouri Valley Conference (MVC)
- Mountain Pacific Sports Federation (MPSF)
- Mountain West Conference (MW) *
- NEC (Northeast Conference before October 2025) **
- Ohio Valley Conference (OVC) **
- Pac-12 Conference (Pac-12) *
- Patriot League **
- Southeastern Conference (SEC) *
- Southern Conference (SoCon) **
- Southland Conference **
- Southwestern Athletic Conference (SWAC) **
- The Summit League (The Summit)
- Sun Belt Conference (SBC) *
- United Athletic Conference (UAC or The United) ** (Note: Known before July 2026 as the Western Athletic Conference.)
- West Coast Conference (WCC)
- NCAA Division I Independents (none in 2026–27)

==== Division I FCS football-only conferences ====
- Coastal Athletic Association Football Conference (CAA Football)
- Missouri Valley Football Conference
- Pioneer Football League

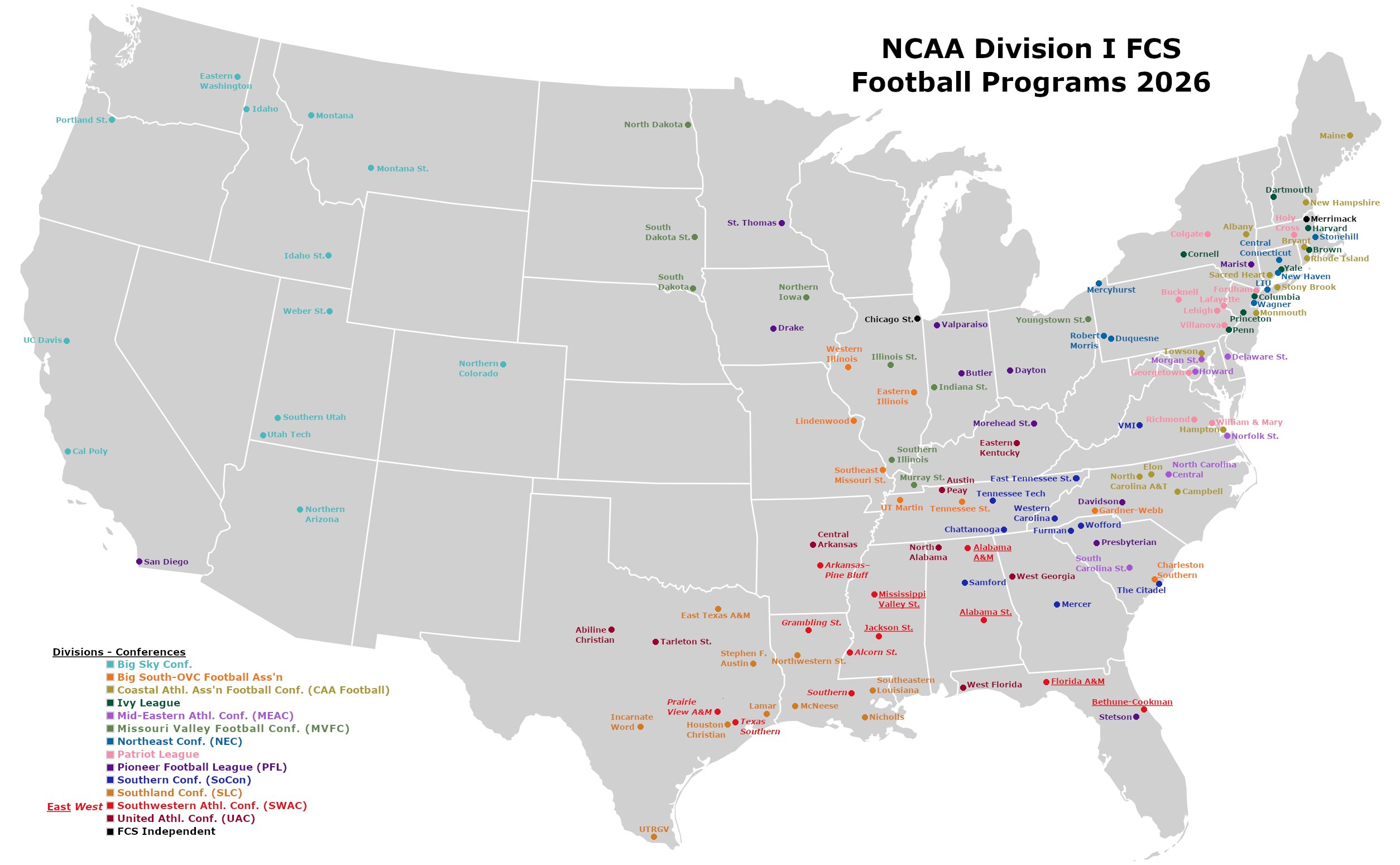
Map of the FCS football programs, 2024

==== Division I hockey-only conferences ====
Division I ice hockey has a different conference structure than the above multisport conferences. These schools have memberships in other conferences for other sports.

Men only

- Central Collegiate Hockey Association (CCHA) – revived in 2021; previously operated from 1971 to 2013
- National Collegiate Hockey Conference (NCHC)

Women only

- New England Women's Hockey Alliance (NEWHA)
- Western Collegiate Hockey Association (WCHA)

Men and women

- Atlantic Hockey America (AHA) – formed in 2024 by the merger of the men's Atlantic Hockey Association and the women's College Hockey America
- ECAC Hockey
- Hockey East (also HEA, from its full name of Hockey East Association)

=== Division II ===
Among the NCAA regulations, Division II institutions must sponsor at least five sports for men and five for women (or four for men and six for women), with two team sports for each sex, and each playing season represented by each sex. Teams that consist of both men and women are counted as men's teams for sports sponsorship purposes.

- California Collegiate Athletic Association (CCAA)
- Central Atlantic Collegiate Conference (CACC)
- Central Intercollegiate Athletic Association (CIAA)
- Conference Carolinas (CC)
- East Coast Conference (ECC)
- Great American Conference (GAC)
- Great Lakes Intercollegiate Athletic Conference (GLIAC)
- Great Lakes Valley Conference (GLVC)
- Great Midwest Athletic Conference (G-MAC)
- Great Northwest Athletic Conference (GNAC)
- Gulf South Conference (GSC)
- Lone Star Conference (LSC)
- Mid-America Intercollegiate Athletics Association (MIAA)
- Mountain East Conference (MEC)
- Northeast-10 Conference (NE-10)
- Northern Sun Intercollegiate Conference (NSIC)
- Pacific West Conference (PacWest)
- Peach Belt Conference (PBC)
- Pennsylvania State Athletic Conference (PSAC)
- Rocky Mountain Athletic Conference (RMAC)
- South Atlantic Conference (SAC)
- Southern Intercollegiate Athletic Conference (SIAC)
- Sunshine State Conference (SSC)
- NCAA Division II Independents

=== Division III ===
Unlike the other two divisions, Division III institutions cannot offer athletic scholarships. Among the other NCAA Division III requirements, all institutions, regardless of enrollment, must sponsor at least three team sports for each sex/gender, and each playing season represented by each sex/gender. Furthermore, a sports sponsorship rule unique to Division III is that the total number of sports that must be sponsored differs by a school's full-time undergraduate enrollment: schools with an enrollment of 1,000 or fewer must sponsor at least five sports for men and five for women; those with larger enrollments must sponsor six men's and six women's sports. As in the other divisions, teams that include both men and women are treated as men's sports for the purpose of these regulations.

- Allegheny Mountain Collegiate Conference (AMCC)
- American Rivers Conference (ARC)
- American Southwest Conference (ASC)
- Atlantic East Conference (AEC)
- Centennial Conference (Centennial)
- City University of New York Athletic Conference (CUNYAC)
- Coast to Coast Athletic Conference (C2C)
- College Conference of Illinois and Wisconsin (CCIW)
- Collegiate Conference of the South (CCS)
- Conference of New England (CNE)
- Empire 8 (E8)
- Great Northeast Athletic Conference (GNAC)
- Heartland Collegiate Athletic Conference (HCAC)
- Landmark Conference (Landmark)
- Liberty League (Liberty)
- Little East Conference (LEC)
- Massachusetts State Collegiate Athletic Conference (MASCAC)
- Michigan Intercollegiate Athletic Association (MIAA)
- Middle Atlantic Conferences (MAC) – An umbrella organization of the following three conferences:
  - MAC Commonwealth, sponsoring competition in 14 sports, but not football
  - MAC Freedom, sponsoring competition in the same set of 14 sports
  - Middle Atlantic Conference, sponsoring 13 sports, including football
- Midwest Conference (Midwest or MWC)
- Minnesota Intercollegiate Athletic Conference (MIAC)
- New England Small College Athletic Conference (NESCAC)
- New England Women's and Men's Athletic Conference (NEWMAC)
- New Jersey Athletic Conference (NJAC)
- North Atlantic Conference (NAC)
- North Coast Athletic Conference (NCAC)
- Northern Athletics Collegiate Conference (NACC)
- Northwest Conference (NWC)
- Ohio Athletic Conference (OAC)
- Old Dominion Athletic Conference (ODAC)
- Presidents' Athletic Conference (PAC)
- Skyline Conference (Skyline)
- Southern Athletic Association (SAA)
- Southern California Intercollegiate Athletic Conference (SCIAC)
- Southern Collegiate Athletic Conference (SCAC)
- State University of New York Athletic Conference (SUNYAC)
- St. Louis Intercollegiate Athletic Conference (SLIAC)
- United East Conference
- University Athletic Association (UAA)
- Upper Midwest Athletic Conference (UMAC)
- USA South Athletic Conference (USA South)
- Wisconsin Intercollegiate Athletic Conference (WIAC)
- NCAA Division III Independents

==== Division III ice hockey-only conferences ====
- ECAC East – men's and women's
- ECAC Northeast – men's only
- ECAC West – men's and women's
- Northern Collegiate Hockey Association (NCHA) – men's and women's
- United Collegiate Hockey Conference (UCHC) – men's and women's

==== Division III lacrosse-only conferences ====
- Midwest Lacrosse Conference (MLC) – men's only
- Midwest Women's Lacrosse Conference (MWLC) – women's only

==== Division III men's volleyball-only conferences ====
- Continental Volleyball Conference (CVC)
- Midwest Collegiate Volleyball League (MCVL)

== Media ==
The NCAA has current media rights contracts with CBS Sports, CBS Sports Network, ESPN/ABC/ESPN+, TNT Sports and Golf Channel for coverage of 43 of its 93 championships. According to the official NCAA website, ESPN and its associated networks have rights to 40 championships, CBS to two, TNT Sports to one and NBC's Golf Channel to two. The following are the most prominent championships and rights holders until the 2031–32 season:

- CBS Sports: Men's basketball (NCAA Division I men's basketball tournament, with TNT Sports, and NCAA Division II men's basketball championship).
- ESPN:
  - Men's Championships – soccer, football (FCS, DII & DIII), cross country, water polo, indoor track & field, swimming & diving, wrestling, ice hockey, gymnastics, fencing, volleyball, lacrosse, outdoor track & field, tennis, baseball and basketball (DII semifinals & DIII semifinals and championship).
  - Women's Championships – soccer, field hockey, volleyball (including DII & DIII), cross country, indoor track & field, swimming & diving, basketball (including DII & DIII), ice hockey, bowling, gymnastics, fencing, beach volleyball, lacrosse, outdoor track & field, tennis, softball and water polo.
  - Also, ESPN has the rights to men's National Invitation Tournament (NIT) and Women's Basketball Invitation Tournament (WBIT).
- TNT Sports: NCAA Division I men's basketball tournament with CBS Sports.
- NBC and Golf Channel: golf (Division I, both genders).
- The championships not broadcast by the media rights partners will be available through NCAA.com.

Westwood One has exclusive radio rights to the men's and women's basketball Final Fours and the Men's College World Series (baseball).

From 1998 to 2013, Electronic Arts had a license to develop college sports video games with the NCAA's branding, which included its NCAA Football, NCAA Basketball (formerly NCAA March Madness) and MVP Baseball series. The NCAA's licensing was not required to produce the games, as rights to use teams are not licensed through the NCAA, but through entities such as individual schools and the Collegiate Licensing Company. EA only acquired the license so that it could officially incorporate the Division I men's basketball tournament into its college basketball game series. The NCAA withdrew EA's license due to uncertainties surrounding a series of lawsuits, most notably O'Bannon v. NCAA, involving the use of player likenesses in college sports video games. After the legalization of NIL, EA revived the NCAA Football series in 2024 under the new name of EA Sports College Football.

== Office of Inclusion ==
=== Inclusion and Diversity Campaign ===
The week-long program took place October 1–5, 2018. The aim was to utilize social media platforms in order to promote diversity and inclusion within intercollegiate athletics. Throughout the NCAA's history, there has been controversy as to the levels of diversity present within intercollegiate athletics, and this campaign is the NCAA's most straightforward approach to combatting these issues.

==== NCAA Inclusion Statement ====
As a core value, the NCAA believes in and is committed to diversity, inclusion and gender equity among its student-athletes, coaches and administrators. It seeks to establish and maintain an inclusive culture that fosters equitable participation for student-athletes and career opportunities for coaches and administrators from diverse backgrounds. Diversity and inclusion improve the learning environment for all student-athletes and enhance excellence within the Association.

The Office of Inclusion will provide or enable programming and education, which sustains foundations of a diverse and inclusive culture across dimensions of diversity including but not limited to age, race, sex, class, national origin, creed, educational background, religion, gender identity, disability, gender expression, geographical location, income, marital status, parental status, sexual orientation and work experiences.

This statement was adopted by the NCAA Executive Committee in April 2010, and amended by the NCAA Board of Governors in April 2017.

==== Gender equity and Title IX ====
While no concrete criteria are given as to a state of gender equity on campuses, an athletics program is considered gender equitable when both women's and men's sports programs reach a consensus.

The basis of Title IX, when amended in 1972 to the 1964 Civil Rights Act, criminalized discrimination on the basis of sex. This plays into intercollegiate athletics in that it helps to maintain gender equity and inclusion in intercollegiate athletics. The NCAA provides many resources to provide information and enforce this amendment.

The NCAA has kept these core values central to its decisions regarding the allocation of championship bids. In April 2016, the Board of Governors announced new requirements for host cities that include protection against discrimination based on sexual orientation or gender identity for all people involved in the event. This decision was prompted by several states passing laws that permit discrimination based on sexual orientation or gender identity in accordance with religious beliefs.

==== LGBTQ ====
The LGBTQ community has been under scrutiny and controversy in the public eye of collegiate athletics, but the NCAA has gradually liberalized its policy on them. The NCAA provides many resources concerning the education of the college community on this topic and policies in order to foster diversity. Title IX protects the transgender community within intercollegiate athletics and on college campuses.

On January 19, 2022, the NCAA approved a new policy for transgender athletes, effective immediately, and this replaced their previous policy, which was in place since 2011. Now, the participation of transgender athletes in a particular sport is generally to be governed by the rules of the sport's national governing body, international federation policy, or International Olympic Committee policy criteria (though an NCAA committee may provide its own recommendation). This action prompted immediate critique from LGBTQ advocates, including Athlete Ally and former NCAA LGBTQ OneTeam facilitator Rhea Debussy.

Previously, the NCAA used testosterone levels to qualify transgender athletes for participation. A transgender male student-athlete was not allowed to compete on a male sports team unless they had undergone medical treatment of testosterone for gender transition, and a transgender female student-athlete was not allowed to compete on a women's sports team until completing one calendar year of testosterone suppression treatment. Under this policy, transgender males were ineligible to compete on a women's team, and transgender females were ineligible to compete on a men's team, without changing the team's status to be a mixed team. In December 2021, John Lohn, the editor-in-chief of Swimming World, criticized NCAA policy; writing about transgender swimmer Lia Thomas, he argued that the "one-year suppressant requirement is not nearly stringent enough to create a level playing field between Thomas and the biological females against whom she is racing".

In 2010, the NCAA Executive Committee announced its support and commitment to diversity, inclusion, and gender equality among its student-athletes, coaches, and administrators. The statement included the NCAA's commitment to ensuring that all students have equal opportunities to achieve their academic goals, and coaches and administrators have equal opportunities for career development in a climate of respect. In 2012, the LGBTQ Subcommittee of the NCAA association-wide Committee on Women's Athletics and the Minority Opportunities and Interests Committee commissioned Champions of Respect, a document that provides resources and advocacy that promotes inclusion and equality for LGBTQ student-athletes, coaches, administrators and all others associated with intercollegiate athletics. This resource uses guides from the Women's Sports Foundation It Takes a Team! project for addressing issues related to LGBTQ equality in intercollegiate athletics. The document provides information on specific issues LGBTQ sportspeople face, similarities and differences of these issues on women's and men's teams, policy recommendations and best practices, and legal resources and court cases.

The NCAA expressed concern over Indiana's Religious Freedom Restoration Act that allows businesses to discriminate against people based on their sexual orientation. This bill was proposed just before Indianapolis was set to host the 2015 Men's Basketball Final Four tournament. The bill clashed with the NCAA core values of inclusion and equality, and forced the NCAA to consider moving events out of Indiana. Under pressure from across the nation and fearing the economic loss of being banned from hosting NCAA events, the governor of Indiana, Mike Pence, revised the bill so that businesses could not discriminate based on sexual orientation, race, religion, or disability. The NCAA accepted the revised bill and continues to host events in Indiana. The bill was enacted into law on July 1, 2015.

On September 12, 2016, the NCAA announced that it would pull all seven planned championship events out of North Carolina for the 2016–2017 academic year. This decision was a response to the state passing the Public Facilities Privacy and Security Act (H.B. 2) on March 23, 2016. This law requires people to use public restrooms that correspond with their sex assigned at birth and stops cities from passing laws that protect against discrimination towards gay and transgender people. The NCAA Board of Governors determined that this law would make ensuring an inclusive atmosphere in the host communities challenging, and relocating these championship events best reflects the association's commitment to maintaining an environment that is consistent with its core values. After state lawmakers repealed the bill and replaced it with a less restrictive one, the NCAA announced in April 2017 that the championship ban on the state had been lifted.

In December 2024, Texas Attorney General Ken Paxton sued the NCAA, arguing that allowing trans women to compete in women's sporting events was "false, deceptive, and misleading" to attendees.

On February 6, 2025, the day after President Donald Trump signed the executive order Keeping Men Out of Women's Sports, the NCAA changed its policy to limit college competitions in women's sports to athletes who were assigned female at birth, effective immediately.

==== Race and ethnicity ====
Racial/Ethnic minority groups in the NCAA are protected by inclusion and diversity policies put in place to increase sensitivity and awareness to the issues and challenges faced across intercollegiate athletics. The NCAA provides a demographics database that can be openly viewed by the public.

Historically, the NCAA has used its authority in deciding on host cities to promote its core values. The Association also prohibits championship events in states that display the Confederate flag, and at member schools that have abusive or offensive nicknames or mascots based on Native American imagery. Board members wish to ensure that anyone associated with an NCAA championship event will be treated with fairness and respect.

==== Student-athletes with disabilities ====
The NCAA defines a disability as a current impairment that has a substantial educational impact on a student's academic performance and requires accommodation. Student-Athletes with disabilities are given education accommodations along with an adapted sports model. The NCAA hosts adapted sports championships for both track and field and swimming and diving as of 2015.

==== International student athletes ====
Over the last two decades recruiting international athletes has become a growing trend among NCAA institutions. For example, most German athletes outside of Germany are based at US universities. For many European athletes, the American universities are the only option to pursue an academic and athletic career at the same time. Some of these students go to the US with high academic expectations and aspirations.

== College team name changes ==
As of 2018, there has been a continuation of changing school mascots that are said by some to be based on racist or offensive stereotypes. Universities under NCAA policy are under scrutiny for specifically Native American-inspired mascots. While many colleges have changed their mascots, some have gotten legal permission from the tribe represented and will continue to bear the mascot. This Native American mascot controversy has not been completely settled; however, many issues have been resolved.

Here is a list of notable colleges that changed Native American mascots and/or nicknames in recent history:

- Stanford – Indians to Cardinals (1972); became Cardinal in 1981
- UMass – Redmen and Redwomen to Minutemen and Minutewomen (1972)
- Dartmouth – Indians to Big Green (1974)
- Siena – Indians to Saints (1988)
- Eastern Michigan – Hurons to Eagles (1991)
- St. Bonaventure - Brown Indians to Bonnies
- St. John's (NY) – Redmen to Red Storm (1994)
- Syracuse - Orangemen to Orange
- Marquette – Warriors to Golden Eagles (1994)
- Chattanooga – Moccasins to Mocs, suggestive of mockingbirds (1996)
- Miami (OH) – Redskins to RedHawks (1997)
- Seattle – Chieftains to Redhawks (2000)
- Colgate – Red Raiders to Raiders (2001)
- Quinnipiac – Braves to Bobcats (2002)
- Southeast Missouri State – Indians (men) and Otahkians (women) to Redhawks (2005)
- Louisiana–Monroe – Indians to Warhawks (2006)
- Arkansas State – Indians to Red Wolves (2008)
- North Dakota – Formally dropped Fighting Sioux in 2012; adopted Fighting Hawks in 2015

Others:

- Illinois – Removed Chief Illiniwek as official symbol in 2007. Athletics teams are still called Fighting Illini.
- Bradley, Alcorn State – Both schools stopped using Native American mascots but have retained their Braves nickname.
- William & Mary – Adjusted Tribe logo to remove feathers to comply with NCAA. Athletics teams are still called Tribe. (2007)
- Chattanooga – removed the mascot, Chief Moccanooga and the Moccasin Shoe imagery in 1996; Kept the term, "Mocs", but reassigned its representation to the official State Bird.

Of note: Utah (Utes), Central Michigan (Chippewas), Florida State (Seminoles) and Mississippi College (Choctaws) all appealed successfully to the NCAA after being deemed "hostile and offensive". Each cited positive relationships with neighboring tribes in appeal. UNC Pembroke (Braves), an institution originally created to educate Native Americans and enjoying close ties to the local Lumbee tribe, was approved to continue the use of native-derived imagery without needing an appeal.

== Rules violations ==
Member schools pledge to follow the rules promulgated by the NCAA. Creation of a mechanism to enforce the NCAA's legislation occurred in 1952 after careful consideration by the membership.

Allegations of rules violations are referred to the NCAA's enforcement staff, who monitor information about potential violations, investigate and process violations, provide notice of alleged violations, and bring cases before the NCAA's Committees on Infractions. A preliminary investigation is initiated to determine if an official inquiry is warranted and to categorize any resultant violations as secondary or major. If several violations are found, the NCAA may determine that the school as a whole has exhibited a "lack of institutional control". The institution involved is notified promptly and may appear on its own behalf before the NCAA Committee on Infractions.

Findings of the Committee on Infractions and the resultant sanctions in major cases are reported to the institution. Sanctions will generally include having the institution placed on "probation" for a period of time, in addition to other penalties. The institution may appeal the findings or sanctions to an appeals committee. After considering written reports and oral presentations by representatives of the Committee on Infractions and the institution, the committee acts on the appeal. Action may include accepting the infractions committee's findings and penalty, altering either, or making its own findings and imposing an appropriate penalty.

In cases of particularly egregious misconduct, the NCAA has the power to ban a school from participating in a particular sport, a penalty known as the "Death Penalty". Since 1985, any school that commits major violations during the probationary period can be banned from the sport involved for up to two years. However, when the NCAA opts not to issue a death penalty for a repeat violation, it must explain why it did not do so. This penalty has only been imposed three times in its modern form, most notably when Southern Methodist University's (SMU) football team had its 1987 season canceled due to massive rules violations dating back more than a decade. SMU opted not to field a team in 1988 as well due to the aftershocks from the sanctions, and the program has never recovered. The Mustangs did not post a winning season until 1997, did not appear in their next bowl game until 2009, did not post consecutive winning seasons until 2011 and 2012, did not return to the national rankings until 2019, and did not win a conference title again until 2023. The devastating effect the death penalty had on SMU has reportedly made the NCAA skittish about issuing another one. Since the SMU case, there are only three instances where the NCAA has seriously considered imposing it against a Division I school; it imposed it against Division II Morehouse College's men's soccer team in 2003 and Division III MacMurray College's men's tennis team in 2005. In addition to these cases, the most recent Division I school to be considered was Penn State. This was because of the Jerry Sandusky Incident that consequently almost landed Penn State on the hook for the death penalty. They received a $60 million fine, in addition to forfeited seasons and other sanctions as well. The NCAA later reversed itself by restoring all forfeited seasons and overturning the remaining sanctions.

Additionally, in particularly egregious cases of rules violations, coaches, athletic directors, and athletic support staff can be barred from working for any NCAA member school without permission from the NCAA. This procedure is known as a "show-cause penalty" (not to be confused with an order to show cause in the legal sense). Theoretically, a school can hire someone with a "show cause" on their record during the time the show cause order is in effect only with permission from the NCAA Infractions Committee. The school assumes the risks and stigma of hiring such a person. It may then end up being sanctioned by the NCAA and the Infractions Committee for their choice, possibly losing athletic scholarships, revenue from schools who would not want to compete with that other school, and the ability for their games to be televised, along with restrictions on recruitment and practicing times. As a result, a show-cause order essentially has the effect of blackballing individuals from being hired for the duration of the order.

One of the most famous scandals in NCAA history involved Heisman Trophy-winning quarterback Cam Newton of the Auburn Tigers in 2011. As a direct effect of not being compensated for his college athletics, Cam Newton's family allegedly sought upwards of $100,000 for him to instead play at Mississippi State. This was revealed days before the conference SEC championship game; however, Cam Newton was later reinstated as there was insufficient evidence against him.

== Sponsors ==
The NCAA has a two-tier sponsorship division. AT&T, Coca-Cola, and Capital One are NCAA Corporate Champions, all others are NCAA Corporate Partners.

Company	Category	Since
Buffalo Wild Wings	Bar and restaurant	2015
AT&T	Telecommunications	2001
Coca-Cola	Non-alcoholic beverages	2002
GEICO	Insurance	2018
Capital One	Banking and credit cards	2008
Nabisco (Ritz and Oreo)	Snack foods	2017
Hershey's (Reese's)	Confections	2009
Nissan (Infiniti)	Car & parts	2010
Wendy's	Fast-food restaurant	2016
Pizza Hut	Restaurant	2016
General Motors (Buick)	Car and parts	2013
Marriott	Hotels and hospitality	2017
Invesco QQQ	Financial services	2021
Intuit Turbotax	Tax preparation	2022
Aflac	Insurance	2021
Great Clips	Hair Salon	2020
LG	Consumer electronics	2021

== Finances ==
As a governing body for amateur sports the NCAA is classified as a tax-exempt not-for-profit organization. As such, it is not required to pay most taxes on income that for-profit private and public corporations are subject to. The NCAA's business model of prohibiting salaries for collegial athletes has been challenged in court, but a 2015 case was struck down. As of 2014 the NCAA reported that it had over $600 million in unrestricted net assets in its annual report. During 2014 the NCAA also reported almost a billion dollars of revenue, contributing to a "budget surplus" – revenues in excess of disbursements for that year – of over $80 million. Over $700 million of that revenue total was from licensing TV rights to its sporting events. In addition, the NCAA also earns money through investment growth of its endowment fund. Established in 2004 with $45 million, the fund has grown to over $380 million in 2014.

=== NCAA expenditures ===
According to the NCAA, it receives most of its annual revenue from two sources: Division I Men's Basketball television and marketing rights, and championships ticket sales. According to the NCAA, "that money is distributed in more than a dozen ways – almost all of which directly support NCAA schools, conferences and nearly half a million student-athletes."

In 2017 total NCAA revenues were in excess of $1.06 billion. Division I basketball television and marketing rights generated $821.4 million, and "championships ticket sales" totaled $129.4 million. Other "smaller streams of revenue, such as membership dues" contributed an unspecified amount.

==== Expenses by category ====
The NCAA provided a breakdown of how those revenues were in turn spent, organizing pay-outs and expenses into some 14 basic categories. By far the largest went to Sports Scholarship and Sponsorship Funds, funding for sports and student scholarships under the Division I Basketball Performance Fund, expenses incurred in producing Division I Championships (including team food, travel, and lodging), the Student Assistance Fund, and Student Athlete Services. Together these top five recipients accounted for 65% of all NCAA expenditures. General and Administrative expenses for running the NCAA day-to-day operations totaled approximately 4% of monies paid out, and other association-wide expenses, including legal services, communications, and business insurance totaled 8%.

The categories:

- $210.8M Sport Sponsorship and Scholarship Funds

Distributed to Division I schools to help fund NCAA sports and provide scholarships for college athletes.

- $160.5M Division I Basketball Performance Fund

Distributed to Division I conferences and independent schools based on their performance in the men's basketball tournament over a six-year rolling period. The money is used to fund NCAA sports and provide scholarships for college athletes.

- $96.7M Division I Championships

Provides college athletes the opportunity to compete for a championship and includes support for team travel, food, and lodging.

- $82.2M Student Assistance Fund

Distributed to Division I student-athletes for essential needs that arise during their time in college.

- $71.8M Student-Athlete Services

Includes funding for catastrophic injury insurance, drug testing, student-athlete leadership programs, postgraduate scholarships, and additional Association-wide championships support.

- $50.3M Division I Equal Conference Fund

Distributed equally among Division I basketball-playing conferences that meet athletic and academic standards to play in the men's basketball tournament. The money is used to fund NCAA sports and provide scholarships for college athletes.

- $46.7M Academic Enhancement Fund

Distributed to Division I schools to assist with academic programs and services.

- $42.3M Division II Allocation

Funds championships, grants, and other initiatives for Division II college athletes.

- $39.6M Membership Support Services

Covers costs related to NCAA governance committees and the annual NCAA Convention.

- $28.2M Division III Allocation

Funds championships, grants, and other initiatives for Division III college athletes.

- $9.5M Division I Conference Grants

Distributed to Division I conferences for programs that enhance officiating, compliance, minority opportunities, and more.

- $3.3M Educational Programs

Supports various educational services for members to help prepare student-athletes for life, including the Women Coaches Academy, the Emerging Leaders Seminars, and the Pathway Program.

- $74.3M Other Association-Wide Expenses

Includes support for Association-wide legal services, communications, and business insurance.

- $39.7M General and Administrative Expenses

Funds the day-to-day operations of the NCAA national office, including administrative and financial services, information technology, and facilities management.

According to the NCAA, the 2017 fiscal year was the first in which its revenues topped $1.0 billion. The increase in revenue from 2016 came from hikes in television and marketing fees, plus greater monies generated from championship events and investment income.

An ESPN critique of the organization's 2017 financials indicated some $560.3 million of the total $956 million paid out went back to its roughly 1,100 member institutions in 24 sports in all three divisions, as well as $200 million for a one-time payment the NCAA made to schools to fund additional programs.

The Division I basketball tournament alone generated some $761 million, with another $60 million in 2016–17 marketing rights. With increases in rights fees it is estimated the basketball tournament will generate some $869 million for the 2018 championship.

=== Player compensation proposals ===
The NCAA has limited the amount of compensation that individual players can receive to scholarships equal to school tuition and related expenses. This rule has generated controversy, in light of the large amounts of revenues that schools earn from sports from TV contracts, ticket sales, and licensing and merchandise. Several commentators have discussed whether the NCAA limit on player compensation violates antitrust laws. There is a consensus among economists that the NCAA's compensation caps for men's basketball and football players benefit the athletes' schools (through rent-seeking) at the expense of the athletes. Economists have subsequently characterized the NCAA as a cartel and collusive monopsony.

Pro-rating payouts to Division I basketball players in proportion to the size of revenues its championship tournament generates relative to the NCAA's total annual revenues would be one possible approach, but will open the door to litigation by students and schools adversely affected by such a formula.

According to a national study by the National College Players Association (NCPA) and the Drexel University Sport Management Department, the average FBS "full" athletic scholarship falls short of the full cost of attending each school by an average of $3285 during 2011–12 school year, and leaves the vast majority of full scholarship players living below the federal poverty line.

In 2020, the NCAA Board of Governors announced that they supported rule changes that would permit players to receive athletics-related endorsements from third-parties. All divisions were expected to adopt new rules relating to the use of players' names, images, and likenesses before the 2021–2022 academic year begins.

On May 6, 2021, Governor Brian Kemp signed Bill 617 into law, giving collegiate athletes the ability to profit off their Name, Image and Likeness. The University of Georgia have said they will immediately compensate their student athletes, while Georgia Tech and Georgia State University have not set anything yet.

On June 21, 2021, the U.S. Supreme Court held unanimously in National Collegiate Athletic Association v. Alston that the NCAA's restrictions on education-related payments were unlawfully in violation of Sherman Act's antitrust and trade regulations. Though this holding did not address restrictions on direct compensation payment to athletes, it also opened the door for the possibility of future court cases concerning this matter.

The NCAA announced on July 1, 2021, that as a result of O'Bannon and numerous state laws giving college players the ability to manage their publicity, the board had agreed to new rules that removed restrictions on college athletes from entering paid endorsements and other sponsorship deals, and from using agents to manage their publicity. Students would still be required to inform the school of all such activities, with the school to make determinations if those activities violate state and local laws.

On the first day of effect for the NIL rule change (July 1), athletes such as D'Eriq King (Miami (FL) quarterback), Justyn Ross (Clemson wide receiver), Bo Nix (Auburn quarterback), Antwan Owen (Jackson State defensive end), McKenzie Milton (Florida State quarterback), Malik Cunningham (Louisville quarterback), Michael Penix Jr. (Indiana quarterback), Spencer Rattler (Oklahoma quarterback), Lexi Sun (Nebraska volleyball), Paige Bueckers (UConn basketball) and twins Haley & Hanna Cavinder (Fresno State basketball), all signed deals and/or unveiled trademarks to profit off of their names, images, and likenesses. As of day one, LSU gymnast Olivia Dunne was projected to be the highest earning college athlete of 2021–22, out of both men's and women's sports.

The new NIL agreement has given student athletes lucrative deals and opportunities to put themselves out there and gain profit using their name, image, and likeness. For example, Ga'Quincy McKinstry, a cornerback from Alabama known since childhood as "Kool-Aid", signed a deal with Kool-Aid. Not only can they partner up with companies, student athletes can get paid for other talents (i.e. singing).

Russell Steinberg in 2021 says, "In addition to his prowess on the football field, where he has a shot at tying the school record for most starts, Marshall's Will Ulmer is a talented musician who wasn't able to earn money using his own name — until now. He had been going by "Lucky Bill" to avoid running afoul of NCAA regulations, but now says he is ready to book shows using his real name" (Steinberg 2021). The NIL has allowed Ulmer great opportunities to further pursue his football and musician career.

Some companies have partnered up with multiple athletes and created a team of their own. Degree, the deodorant brand, started a team of 14 student athletes to help promote their brand. Degree calls this team Breaking Limits. "The Unilever-owned antiperspirant brand has committed $5 million over the next five years to inspire people to break limits. The first group of athletes that Degree has selected represent a diverse range of backgrounds regarding race, gender, and sport, and their stories will be unveiled on Instagram. These athletes will also have the chance to participate in events to help their local communities" (Steinberg 2021).

On May 23, 2024, the NCAA and its five power conferences agreed to allow schools to directly pay players for the first time in the 100-plus-year history of college sports. The NCAA and its leagues announced their intention to enter into a multibillion-dollar agreement to settle three pending antitrust cases. In doing so, the NCAA will pay more than $2.7 billion in damages over ten years to more than 10,000 past and current athletes. It is anticipated that each player in the class will receive an annual check worth 10% of the money they are owed. Additionally, the NCAA and its league are also set to enter into a revenue-sharing plan, which allows each member school to share up to roughly $20 million per year with its athletes.

== Individual awards ==
The NCAA presents a number of different individual awards, including:

- NCAA Award of Valor (not given every year); selection is based on the heroic action occurring during the academic year.
- NCAA Gerald R. Ford Award, honoring an individual who has provided significant leadership as an advocate for intercollegiate athletics.
- NCAA Inspiration Award (not given every year); selection is based on inspirational action.
- NCAA Sportsmanship Award, honoring student-athletes who have demonstrated one or more of the ideals of sportsmanship.
- NCAA Theodore Roosevelt Award, the highest honor that the NCAA can confer on an individual.
- NCAA Woman of the Year Award, honoring a senior student-athlete who has distinguished herself throughout her collegiate career in academics, athletics, service, and leadership.
- Elite Scholar-Athlete Award, honoring the student-athlete with the highest cumulative GPA who has reached the competition at the finals site for each of the NCAA's 94 men's and women's championships (in Divisions I, II, and III, plus "National Collegiate" championships open to schools from more than one division).
- Silver Anniversary Awards, honoring six distinguished former student-athletes on the 25th anniversary of their college graduation.
- The Flying Wedge Award, one of the NCAA's highest honors exemplifying outstanding leadership and service to the NCAA.
- Today's Top 10 Award, honoring ten outstanding senior student-athletes.
- Walter Byers Scholarship, honoring the top male and female scholar-athletes.

In previous years, the NCAA has presented the following awards at its NCAA Honors event: Astronaut Salute, Business Leader Salute, Congressional Medal of Honor Salute, Governor Salute, Olympians Salute, Performing Arts Salute, President's Cabinet Salute, Prominent National Media Salute, Special Recognition Awards, U.S. House of Representatives Salute, and U.S. Senate Salute.

== Other collegiate athletic organizations ==
The NCAA is the dominant, but not the only, collegiate athletic organization in the United States. Several other such collegiate athletic organizations exist.

=== In the United States ===
- Association for Intercollegiate Athletics for Women (AIAW) – disbanded in 1982, after NCAA began sponsoring championships in women's sports
- California Community College Athletic Association (CCCAA) – two-year colleges in California
- National Association of Intercollegiate Athletics (NAIA)
- National Christian College Athletic Association (NCCAA)
- National Junior College Athletic Association (NJCAA) – two-year colleges (does not operate in California or the Pacific Northwest)
- Northwest Athletic Conference (NWAC) – two-year colleges in Oregon and Washington, plus one member in the Canadian province of British Columbia
- United States Collegiate Athletic Association (USCAA)

=== Foreign equivalents ===
- Australia: UniSport Australia
- Canada: U Sports, and Canadian Collegiate Athletic Association (CCAA)
- Indonesia: Liga Mahasiswa (LIMA)
- Nigeria: Nigerian University Games Association (NUGA)
- Philippines: National Collegiate Athletic Association (Philippines) (NCAA), and University Athletic Association of the Philippines (UAAP)
- Poland Academic Sports Association (AZS)
- South Africa: Varsity Sports (South Africa)
- United Kingdom: British Universities & Colleges Sport

== See also ==
- Lists of NCAA institutions
- College athletics in the United States
- College club sports in the United States
- College recruiting
- College rivalries
- Higher education in the United States
- Homosexuality in modern sports
- List of college athletic programs by U.S. state
- List of U.S. college mascots
- NCAA Native American mascot decision
