= NCAA v. Smith =

National Collegiate Athletic Association v. Smith
- Supreme Court of the United States

Argued January 20, 1999 Decided February 23, 1999
- Full case name: National Collegiate Athletic Association, Petitioner v. R. M. Smith
- Citations: 525 U.S. 459 (more) 119 S. Ct. 924; 142 L. Ed. 2d 929; 1999 U.S. LEXIS 1511; 67 U.S.L.W. 4130; 99 Cal. Daily Op. Service 1345; 99 Daily Journal DAR 1669; 1999 Colo. J. C.A.R. 878; 12 Fla. L. Weekly Fed. S 110
- Argument: Oral argument

Case history
- Prior: Smith v. NCAA, 978 F. Supp. 213 (W.D. Pa. 1997); affirmed in part, reversed in part, 139 F.3d 180 (3d Cir. 1998); cert. granted, 524 U.S. 982 (1998).
- Subsequent: Smith v. NCAA, 266 F.3d 152 (3d Cir. 2001)

Holding
- Dues payments from recipients of federal funds do not suffice to subject the NCAA to suit under Title IX.

Court membership
- Chief Justice William Rehnquist Associate Justices John P. Stevens · Sandra Day O'Connor; Antonin Scalia · Anthony Kennedy; David Souter · Clarence Thomas; Ruth Bader Ginsburg · Stephen Breyer

Case opinion
- Majority: Ginsburg, joined by unanimous

Laws applied
- Title IX of the Education Amendments of 1972, 20 U.S.C. § 1681, et seq.

National Collegiate Athletic Association v. Smith, 525 U.S. 459 (1999), was a case in which the Supreme Court of the United States ruled that the NCAA's receipt of dues payments from colleges and universities which received federal funds, was not sufficient to subject the NCAA to a lawsuit under Title IX.

== Background ==
Renee M. Smith, an intercollegiate volleyball player, had played volleyball for two seasons from the fall of 1991 to 1993 at St. Bonaventure University. Smith graduated from St. Bonaventure University during the 1994 - 1995 athletic year and later enrolled in a postgraduate program at the University of Pittsburgh for the 1995 - 1996 athletic year. Smith had hoped to play volleyball for the University of Pittsburgh but was denied athletic eligibility by the NCAA on the basis of its Post Baccalaureate restrictions. Smith and The University of Pittsburgh applied for a waiver from the National Collegiate Athletic Association, to lift the restrictions on the athletic eligibility of graduate students. However the waiver was denied by the NCAA.

=== Procedural history ===
In August 1996, Smith filed a lawsuit pro se against the NCAA, alleging that the NCAA’s decision to not allow her to play intercollegiate volleyball at the University of Pittsburgh and Hofstra University on the basis of her sex, in that the NCAA grants more waivers for athletic eligibility restrictions to male than female post graduate student athletes. The NCAA attempted to have the case dismissed on the grounds that it did not receive federal assistance. This would exempt the NCAA from compliance with Title IX which states that "No person in the United States shall, on the basis of sex, be excluded from participation in, be denied the benefits of, or be subjected to discrimination under any education program or activity receiving Federal financial assistance..." The district court dismissed the case, claiming that Smith could not claim that Title IX was applicable. Smith then amended her claim.

The Court of Appeals for the Third Circuit later reversed the district court's decision. The NCAA then petitioned for Supreme Court review. They claimed that the court decision did not agree with the previous court case Department of Transportation v. Paralyzed Veterans of America, which prohibits discrimination against any handicapped person in “any program or activity receiving any federal financial assistance.” The Supreme Court granted certiorari, in order to find out if a private organization such as the NCAA, that does not receive federal financial assistance, can be subject to Title IX simply because it receives funds from organizations that do receive federal financial assistance, making the NCAA indirectly federally funded.

== Opinion of the Court ==
The Supreme Court came to a unanimous decision ruling that the NCAA cannot be sued under Title IX of the Education Amendments of 1972 and remanded the case for further proceedings complying with this decision. The Supreme Court held that allegations did not exist that state that the NCAA uses the funds from its institutions that are federally funded, to provide any students with any form of financial aid. They stressed that only institutions that are federally funded directly can be subject to coverage by Title IX.

The NCAA was represented on its appeal to the Supreme Court by John Roberts, who would later become Chief Justice of the United States in 2005.

== See also ==
- NCAA v. Board of Regents of the University of Oklahoma
- List of United States Supreme Court cases, volume 525
