= Sanity Code =

1948 rules enacted by the National Collegiate Athletic Association

The Sanity Code (officially the Principles for the Conduct of Intercollegiate Athletics) was a set of rules adopted by the National Collegiate Athletic Association (NCAA) in 1948 to address student financial aid. The code barred athletes at member institutions from receiving any form of financial aid that was not solely needs-based and also required them to meet the same academic standards as all non-athlete students.

Since the NCAA's founding in 1906, it has specified that college sports should be purely amateur. Regulation and enforcement, however, were left to its member institutions. Several universities and athletic conferences, such as the Southeastern Conference, allowed for the use of athletic scholarships, a move that was opposed by universities and conferences in the Northern and Western United States, such as the Pacific Coast Conference. A 1946 conference was called to address this rift, with the Sanity Code being the result. Following several years of discussion and further voting, it was officially incorporated into the NCAA's constitution in January 1948. By 1949, the NCAA's compliance committee found seven institutions, primarily from the South, as being in violation of the code and recommended that they be expelled from the NCAA. However, at the 1950 convention, despite a majority of institutions voting for expulsion, the required two-thirds majority was not reached and the institutions, despite their code violations, remained in the association. Following the vote, many in the NCAA doubted that the code could ever be enforced, and at the 1951 convention, members voted to remove the code.

The code is considered the first attempt by the NCAA to act as a rules-enforcement organization, and according to economist Andrew Zimbalist, several economists have pointed to the code as the beginning of the NCAA's foray into cartelization. Following the code's repeal, the NCAA appointed Walter Byers as the association's initial full-time executive director and created a committee to oversee rules enforcement. In 1956, the NCAA reversed its position on scholarships and, for the first time, authorized the granting of financial aid for student athletes solely for athletic ability.

== Background ==
In 1906, the Intercollegiate Athletic Association of the United States (renamed in 1910 to the National Collegiate Athletic Association, NCAA) was established by administrators of several American universities to oversee college sports. In the association's 1906 bylaws, they specified that college athletics would solely consist of amateur sports. They defined an amateur as "one who participates in competitive physical sports only for the pleasure, and the physical, mental, moral and social benefits derived therefrom" in 1916. However, universities that were part of the NCAA were allowed to grant athletes needs-based financial aid, unrelated to athletics. The NCAA left enforcement of its amateurism policy up to its member universities, leading to several instance of collegiate athletes violating this policy throughout the first half of the 20th century. In 1929, the Carnegie Corporation of New York published a report alleging widespread recruiting and financial assistance in college football, stating that what was supposed to be an amateur sport contained elements of "professionalism". Two years later, Edward K. Hall, the chair of the NCAA's football rules committee gave a speech titled "A Return to Sanity", where he urged cooperative action from association members against the growing number of universities that were engaging in non-amateur activities. A 1935 survey of NCAA member institutions revealed that only about 36 percent of the association's members were fully complying with the pure amateurism rules, with a large percentage calling the rules "impossible" to comply with. Additionally, several athletic conferences by that time were allowing athletic scholarships, including the Southeastern Conference (SEC), with several more considering allowing them. In 1941, in a move to address the shortcomings of the self-enforcement policy, the NCAA adopted a new constitution that allowed for member institutions to be expelled from the association if they violated the rules.

The issue of amateurism became more evident immediately following World War II as many universities that had shuttered their athletics programs during the war revived them and college recruiting efforts focused on athletes who had served in the military. In 1946, sportswriter Francis Wallace reported extensively on these recruitment efforts from boosters, including generous financial offers made to high-profile American football athletes such as Bill DeCorrevont, Shorty McWilliams, and Buddy Young. In the case of McWilliams, Wallace reported that an unnamed university had offered him $15,000 (equivalent to $242,000 in 2024), the use of a car, and a job with a monthly salary of $300 ($4,800 in 2024). Universities and conferences disagreed on a standard approach to athlete compensation. Conferences in the Southern United States, such as the Missouri Valley Conference, the SEC, the Southern Conference (SoCon), and the Southwest Conference (SWC), all favored the awarding of athletic scholarships. Meanwhile, the Big Nine Conference (later known as the Big Ten Conference), the Pacific Coast Conference (PCC), and many independent schools in the Eastern United States (including later members of the Ivy League) were opposed. At the time, both the Big Nine and the PCC had conference rules prohibiting athletic scholarships.

== The Sanity Code ==
From July 22–23, 1946, the NCAA, led by NCAA President Karl Leib, held a conference in Chicago to address issues within college athletics, particularly with recruiting. At the time, individual athletic conferences were considered the primary regulatory bodies in college sports, and as a result, this special meeting was considered a "Conference of Conferences", attracting representatives of 20 different conferences. During the meeting, the association developed a set of "Principles for the Conduct of Intercollegiate Athletics". Initially nicknamed the "Purity Code", "Sanity Code" was eventually adopted as a less pejorative alternative, becoming the common nickname for the principles.

Much of the Sanity Code reiterated existing amateurism standards. The code stated that universities could only offer athletes scholarships that were needs-based and could not rescind scholarships if the recipient ceased to be a member of their athletics program. Additionally, university officials were barred from recruiting with financial incentives, and student athletes were required to meet the same academic standards as non-athletes. At the Chicago conference, a rule was discussed that would have barred off-campus recruiting of athletes, though it was ultimately voted down. To oversee enforcement, the NCAA would create two committees: the Fact Finding Committee and the Constitutional Compliance Committee. The former would investigate instances of code violation, while the latter would serve as arbiters, granted the power to interpret the code and assess whether an infraction had occurred. The only punishment stipulated by the code was expulsion from the NCAA, which could only be performed by a two-thirds vote of NCAA member institutions present at a convention. According to economist Andrew Zimbalist, the code was considered a compromise between the southern conferences and the future members of the Ivy League.

Following the Chicago convention, copies of the code were distributed to over 400 universities for review. About six months later, at the NCAA general convention held in New York City on January 8, 1947, representatives again met to formally vote on the draft proposals. The proposals were provisionally adopted at that time, and it was scheduled that a vote on adding the proposals to the constitution would be carried out during the 1948 general conference. The Big Nine and the PCC were highly supportive of the proposals, while representatives from several southern conferences were opposed. Among universities within the SEC, the president of Louisiana State University advocated for fellow members to abide only by conference rules and regulations and not those imposed by the NCAA, while the president of the University of Kentucky floated the idea of leaving the NCAA altogether while still maintaining its conference membership. Albert D. Kirwan, an administrator at Kentucky, was considered a major critic of the code during this time, alongside Curley Byrd, the president of the University of Maryland, College Park. Both Kirwan and Byrd had previously served as head coaches for their respective universities' football programs before becoming academic administrators. Despite the opposition, the Sanity Code was approved almost unanimously at the 1948 general convention, coming into effect on January 10.

Over the course of 1948, the compliance committee, granted a budget of $5,000 ($65,400 in 2024) was set up to investigate potential noncompliance issues with the code. In June of that year, the PCC levied fines against several members for violations of the code, amounting to between $120 and $5,500 ($1,590 and $72,700 in 2024). Overall though, there were very few complaints from NCAA member institutions regarding the code. However, in May 1949, representatives from the SEC, SoCon, and SWC met and came to an agreement that the code was too restrictive in its financial aid and that scholarships should include assistance other than just tuition, including room and board, food, laundry, and books. The three conferences also discussed possibly leaving the NCAA. Representatives from southern institutions also complained that the code favored elite universities, primarily from the northern and eastern United States, arguing in part that those universities had a wealthier alumni base that could more easily pay athletes in secret. According to sportswriter Kenneth Shropshire, the code led to the widespread proliferation of "under-the-table scholarships or other payments based on athletic abilities".

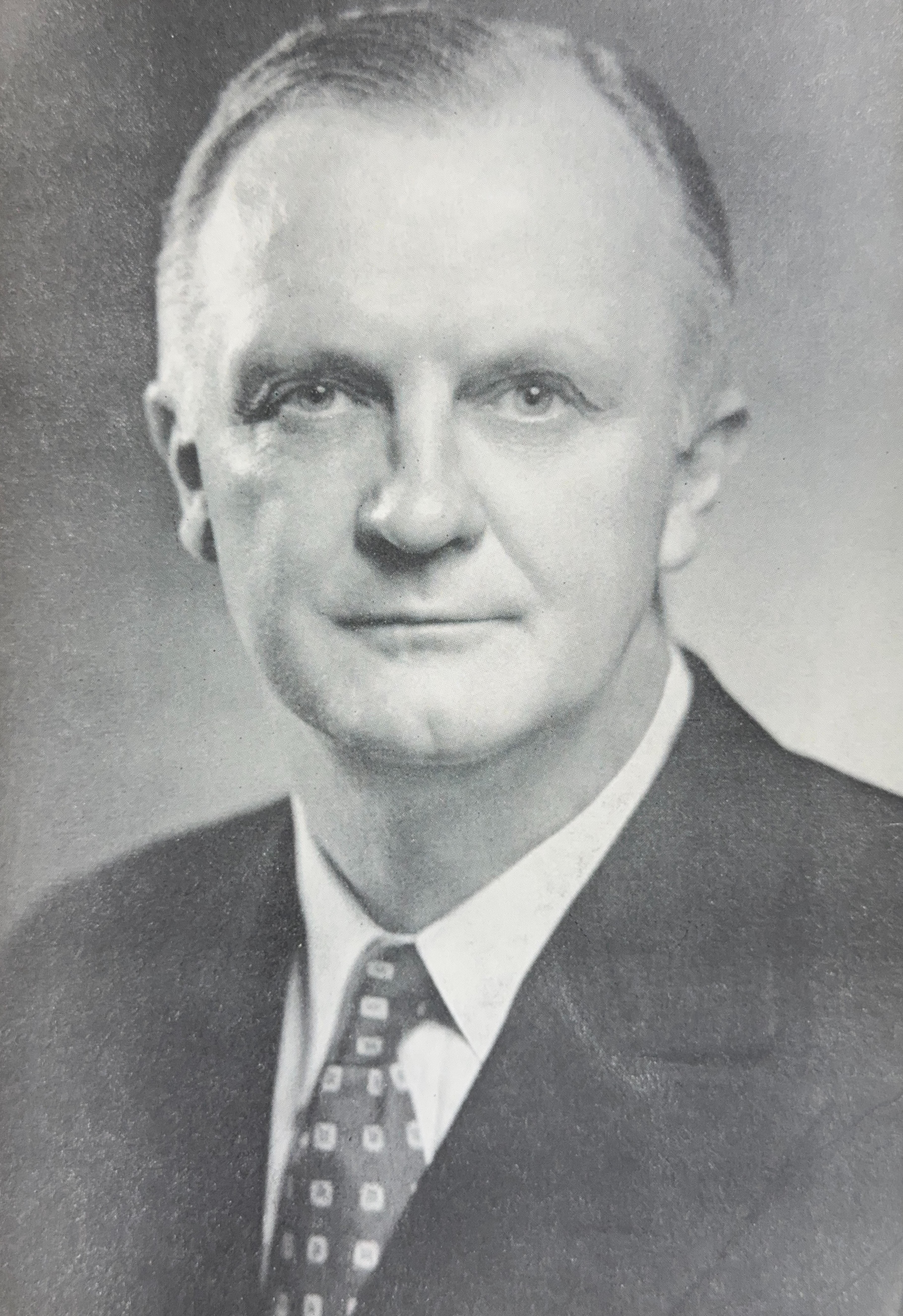
Colgate Darden (pictured c. 1958), president of the University of Virginia, threatened to withdraw the university from the NCAA because of the code.

Several universities refused to comply with the code, with recruiting and scholarship practices remaining unchanged as administrators awaited a test case for the new rules. The University of Virginia openly called the code unenforceable, and in mid-1949, university president Colgate Darden, with the support of the university's governing board, announced that the university would leave the NCAA unless the code were amended to allow for athletic scholarships. The board voted to approve these measures on July 21 and promptly notified the NCAA. The university announced that 24 football players had received financial aid from an alumni association that helped cover part or all of their tuition.

=== The "Seven Sinners" ===
In 1949, the compliance committee stated that they were looking to take possible action against 20 institutions that had been found to be in violation of the code, in addition to 19 other institutions that were in possible violation. Of the 20, 13 were able to return to good standing with the committee. Before the 1950 general convention, the committee announced that they would be recommending the seven universities that had not changed their practices for an expulsion vote. These institutions, nicknamed the "Sinful Seven" or the "Seven Sinners", were: the Augustinian College of Villanova, Boston College, The Citadel, the University of Maryland, College Park, the University of Virginia, the Virginia Military Institute, and the Virginia Polytechnic Institute. Specifically, the committee charged that these institutions were offering athletic scholarships to athletes regardless of their financial status. Of these seven, all were southern universities except for Boston College and Villanova, which were Catholic universities in the Northern United States.

At the NCAA convention in 1950, a motion was made to expel the seven institutions for failure to comply with the code, which was followed by six hours of debate. According to journalist Keith Dunnavant, the move to expel these universities from the association was "unprecedented". However, on January 14 of that year, representatives voted 111 for expulsion and 93 against. The seven institutions were allowed to remain in the NCAA, as the vote fell 25 members short of the prerequisite two-thirds needed for expulsion. Despite this, the seven universities were found by officers of the NCAA to be "not in good standing" with the association, and they were barred from postseason participation.

=== Repeal ===
Following the vote, the Chicago Tribune published an article declaring that the NCAA as an organization was dead, and many NCAA members doubted that the code could ever be effectively utilized to prevent the payment of athletes. The same day as the vote, Byrd requested that NCAA member institutions be resurveyed regarding their stances on the Sanity Code. This "Byrd Resolution" was approved by the NCAA, and the subsequent review found that, while most small universities were in favor of the code, larger universities were more resistant. Some university representatives felt that the institutions should be allowed to offer more aid to athletes, such as room and board. Per their arguments, many athletes were unable to work part-time jobs in addition to their scholastic and athletic responsibilities (and in the case of military academies, their military duties), leading to the creation of fake jobs for athletes and other forms of underhanded dealings. There were also concerns about the NCAA acting as a regulatory body, which some universities felt should be the sole responsibility of the universities and athletic conferences. During this time, several universities, primarily in the South, began to openly disclose that they would be providing academic aid on an athletic basis. In 1950, the Integrity Code was proposed as a replacement for the Sanity Code, though it was never adopted by the NCAA. This new code would have classified member institutions into one of five tiers based on the level of aid provided to athletes.

On January 12, 1951, during an NCAA convention, proposals were made for abolishing the enforcement provisions and the sections concerning financial aid from the Sanity Code, and the following day, member institutions voted to repeal the code. The modification required a two-thirds majority, with 130 voting for repeal and 60 voting to maintain it. The only portions of the code that remained on the books was a provision that included preventing universities from paying for the travel expenses for prospective students. As a replacement, the NCAA adopted a constitutional amendment that stated that "control and responsibility for the conduct of intercollegiate athletics shall be exercised by the institution itself or, in the case of the institution having membership in a regional athletic conference, by such conference."

== Aftermath and legacy ==
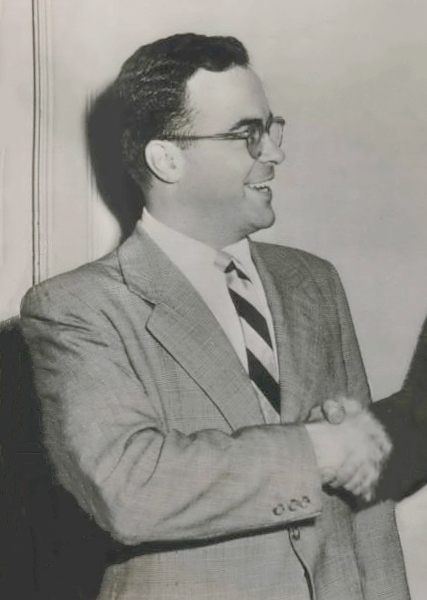
Walter Byers became the NCAA's first executive director in 1951 and led the association to take a more active role in rules enforcement.

The repeal of the Sanity Code occurred around the same time that several high-profile scandals were occurring in college athletics, including a point-shaving scandal involving several college basketball teams and an honor code violation involving members of the 1951 Army Cadets football team. According to academic John R. Thelin, these incidents raised concerns about whether or not college sports could function properly as is, calling it an "unregulated industry". In response, many universities chose to expand the NCAA's regulatory powers. In 1951, the NCAA appointed its first executive director, Walter Byers, who made rules enforcement a priority during his tenure. That same year, the Sanity Code was replaced with a Committee on Infractions that had broad authority to levy sanctions against institutions that are found to be not in good standing. For the 1952–53 college basketball season, the NCAA placed two universities (Kentucky and Bradley University) on suspension for rules violations, marking the first time that the association had suspended a member institution. In 1956, the NCAA authorized the grant-in-aid program, which allowed for the awarding of athletic scholarships solely for athletic abilities, without concern for academic achievement or financial need. By the 1960s, the NCAA's long-standing policy of self-regulation had largely been replaced by a more active association that was enforcing its own rules and assessing damages against violating institutions.

Multiple commentators note that the Sanity Code was significant as the first attempt by the NCAA to act as a regulatory body. However, this initial effort was widely considered a failure, with sportswriter Richard Hyland of the Los Angeles Times comparing the code to Prohibition in the United States, in that it was a wide-reaching act that was ultimately repealed. According to academic Mike Oriard, the code was also significant for being the first time that the NCAA had explicitly addressed the topic of scholarships for athletes. Howard Chudacoff called the code and its repeal as marking the beginning of "[t]he era of modern intercollegiate athletics". Byers similarly has noted that the defeat of the code was one of the most important developments in the history of college athletics. According to Zimbalist, several economists view the code as the beginning of the NCAA's transformation into a cartel. In a 1992 work cowritten by economist Robert Tollison, he and his coauthors said, "In the years 1946–53, the NCAA made the transition from a loosely tied, mostly voluntary association to an effective cartel".

== See also ==
- Knight Commission, a college sports reform organization

== Sources ==
- Berlow, Lawrence H. (1994). Sports Ethics: A Reference Handbook. Contemporary World Issues. Santa Barbara, California: ABC-Clio. ISBN 978-0-87436-769-0. OCLC 31011434.
- Byers, Walter (1995). Unsportsmanlike Conduct: Exploiting College Athletes. With Charles Hammer. Ann Arbor, Michigan: University of Michigan Press. ISBN 978-0-472-10666-0. OCLC 32430595.
- Carter, W. Burlette (Spring 2006). "The Age of Innocence: The First 25 Years of the National Collegiate Athletic Association, 1906 to 1931". Vanderbilt Journal of Entertainment and Technology Law. 8 (2). Vanderbilt University Law School: 211–291. Archived from the original on March 2, 2024.
- Chudacoff, Howard P. (2015). Changing the Playbook: How Power, Profit, and Politics Transformed College Sports. Sport and Society. Urbana, Illinois: University of Illinois Press. ISBN 978-0-252-03978-2. OCLC 933297877.
- Corrie, Bruce A. (1978). The Atlantic Coast Conference, 1953–1978: Silver Anniversary. Durham, North Carolina: Carolina Academic Press.
- Crowley, Joseph N. (2006). In the Arena: The NCAA's First Century. Indianapolis: National Collegiate Athletic Association. ISBN 978-0-9774946-0-6. OCLC 62901897.
- Dunnavant, Keith (2004). The Fifty-Year Seduction: How Television Manipulated College Football, from the Birth of the Modern NCAA to the Creation of the BCS. New York City: Thomas Dunne Books. ISBN 978-0-312-32345-5. OCLC 56108413.
- Falla, Jack (1981). NCAA: The Voice of College Sports: A Diamond Anniversary History, 1906–1981. Mission, Kansas: National Collegiate Athletic Association. ISBN 978-0-913504-70-3. OCLC 7795171.
- Figone, Albert J. (2012). Cheating the Spread: Gamblers, Point Shavers, and Game Fixers in College Football and Basketball. Sport and Society. Urbana, Illinois: University of Illinois Press. ISBN 978-0-252-03728-3. OCLC 1176314894.
- Fleisher, Arthur A. III; Goff, Brian L.; Tollison, Robert D. (1992). The National Collegiate Athletic Association: A Study in Cartel Behavior. Chicago: University of Chicago Press. ISBN 978-0-226-25326-8. OCLC 24064982.
- Lapchick, Richard E.; Slaughter, John Brooks (1989). The Rules of the Game: Ethics in College Sport. American Council on Education. New York City: Macmillan Publishing Company. ISBN 978-0-02-897401-9. OCLC 19556170.
- Miller, Richard I. (1953). The Truth About Big-Time Football. Cartoons by John Massey. New York City: William Sloane Associates.
- Montez de Oca, Jeffrey (2013). Discipline and Indulgence: College Football, Media, and the American Way of Life during the Cold War. Critical Issues in Sport and Society. New Brunswick, New Jersey: Rutgers University Press. doi:10.36019/9780813561288. ISBN 978-0-8135-6127-1. OCLC 859537568.
- Oriard, Michael (2001). King Football: Sport and Spectacle in the Golden Age of Radio and Newsreels, Movies and Magazines, the Weekly & the Daily Press. Chapel Hill, North Carolina: University of North Carolina Press. ISBN 978-0-8078-2650-8. OCLC 57706664.
- Oriard, Michael (2009). Bowled Over: Big-Time College Football from the Sixties to the BCS Era. Chapel Hill, North Carolilna: University of North Carolina Press. ISBN 978-0-8078-9865-9. OCLC 609863449.
- Rader, Benjamin G. (2004) [1983]. American Sports: From the Age of Folk Games to the Age of Televised Sports (5th ed.). Upper Saddle River, New Jersey: Prentice Hall. ISBN 978-0-13-097750-2. OCLC 52092108.
- Shropshire, Kenneth L. (1996). In Black and White: Race and Sports in America. Foreword by Kellen Winslow. New York City: New York University Press. ISBN 978-0-8147-8016-9. OCLC 33971530.
- Smith, Ronald A. (2001). Play-by-Play: Radio, Television, and Big-Time College Sport. Baltimore: Johns Hopkins University Press. ISBN 978-0-8018-6686-9. OCLC 51481223.
- Smith, Ronald A. (2011). Pay for Play: A History of Big-Time College Athletic Reform. Sport and Society. Urbana, Illinois: University of Illinois Press. ISBN 978-0-252-03587-6. OCLC 700709008.
- Thelin, John R. (1996) [1994]. Games Colleges Play: Scandal and Reform in Intercollegiate Athletics (Johns Hopkins Paperbacks ed.). Baltimore: Johns Hopkins University Press. ISBN 978-0-8018-5504-7. OCLC 28548193.
- Vincent, John; Williams, Dylan (2016). "College Sports and Society". In DeVitis, Joseph L.; Sasso, Pietro A. (eds.). Higher Education and Society. New York City: Peter Lang. pp. 119–145. ISBN 978-1-4331-2871-4. OCLC 918616272.
- Walsh, Christopher J. (2006). Where Football is King: A History of the SEC (First Taylor Trade Publishing ed.). Lanham, Maryland: Taylor Trade Publishing. ISBN 978-1-58979-355-2. OCLC 64335804.
- Zimbalist, Andrew (1999). Unpaid Professionals: Commercialism and Conflict in Big-Time College Sports. Princeton, New Jersey: Princeton University Press. ISBN 978-0-691-00955-1. OCLC 40698637.
- Zimbalist, Andrew (2011). Circling the Bases: Essays on the Challenges and Prospects of the Sports Industry. Philadelphia: Temple University Press. ISBN 978-1-4399-0282-0. OCLC 698590969.
