= Amateurism in the NCAA =

The definition of amateurism within the context of collegiate sports has evolved since it was first pronounced by the NCAA upon its inception in 1906. In its early stages, changes in the NCAA's core beliefs in what a student-athlete should be rewarded and allowed to accept financially for their athletic talents had its effects on the definition of amateurism. Over the course of the 20th and early 21st century, regulatory changes, court claims, and the beliefs of NCAA authority about student-athlete compensation further developed what an amateur collegiate athlete is entitled to receive. This evolution is what impacted the evolving logistics of the NCAA Bylaw 12, which explains the current definition of amateurism and what it grants or restricts a collegiate athlete to be able to receive as compensation for their participation. These guidelines have been described to both benefit and unjustifiably limit the student-athlete and the success of institutions’ athletic performance. This debate has been a strong driver in court claims against the NCAA and the mainstream controversy about what student-athletes should have the right to receive financially.

== Background ==
In 1906, one year after a college football season which resulted in the deaths of eighteen students and severe injuries to 150 more, 62 member schools formed the Intercollegiate Athletics Association (IAA). The IAA's main purpose was to regulate collegiate sports and ensure that players were treated fairly and kept safe. Just four years later, the IAA modified its name to become the National Collegiate Athletic Association (NCAA). By doing so, the NCAA was granted additional rule-making power which now allowed them to include amateurism and eligibility. The NCAA was designated as a non-profit institution whose focus was to establish amateurism as the core foundation for college sports. At this time, the NCAA did not allow any sort of payment to their amateur athletes from university faculty nor financial aid. Another effort to protect amateurism at this time was banning the recruitment of athletes from preparatory institutions. In 1916, the NCAA designated an amateur collegiate athlete as someone that played their sport purely for the enjoyment and developing their mental, physical, moral, and social skills. The founders of the NCAA wanted a clear line between college and professional sports, with college sport acting as one of the many branches of the educational program. This line was also drawn by the forbidding of any sort of scholarship for athletic performance.

In 1929, the Carnegie Foundation for the Advancement of Teaching published one of the first comprehensive studies on the tensions between amateurism and the economics of college athletics. The Carnegie report analyzed 112 college athletic programs, noting the threats that commercialism posed to the integrity of sport and the role of amateurism. Furthermore, it traced the roots of profit all the way back to 1880, in which the first ticket sales were recorded: "charges for admission to football contests advanced in some instances to $1.50...special financial support began to be solicited from alumni. One result was that alumni who made generous contributions to college athletics received, openly or covertly, in return, a generous share in their control".

In 1948, the introduction of a set of rules to "alleviate the proliferation of exploitative practices in the recruitment of student-athletes," deemed the Sanity Code, in part eliminated financial aid to athletes not available to other students at their school. The newly introduced Sanity Code prohibited colleges from providing student-athletes with additional financial aid unavailable to the ordinary college student. The amateur collegiate athlete was granted the right to receive payment to cover their tuition-and-fees in order to attend the school, but could not receive money towards their room and board. It is also important to note that the student needed to demonstrate financial need and meet the school's standard admissions requirements in order to be eligible for the scholarship.

In 1951, Walter Byers rose as the head authority of the NCAA. Upon his appointment to his position, he created the term “student-athlete” in order to place emphasis on collegiate athletes being students first before athletes. This tactic was used in order to further discourage universities from treating their athletes as professionals with compensation beyond the regulated level, thus solidifying their amateur status. However, towards the end of his career, Byers' views about athlete compensation changed in favor of allowing student-athletes to "endorse products and receive additional financial assistance". Although Byers would be pushed out of his position to lower his voice supporting commercial endorsement, the NCAA would allow athletic scholarships to cover room, board, and “laundry money” before Byers ended his term. The next major regulation change occurred in 2011, when the president of the NCAA Mark Emmert allowed Division 1 institutions to give a $2000 stipend to student-athletes on top of their cost of attendance. Emmert continues to seek additional financial support for student-athletes that covers necessary expenses outside of what is covered by athletic scholarship.

The case of O'Bannon v. NCAA in 2014, brought to court by former UCLA basketball player Ed O'Bannon, was regarding the legitimacy of the rights granted by the amateurism regulations O’Bannon argued his right to his public image and sought compensation for his image being depicted in an EA college basketball video game. Federal judge Claudia Wilken ruled in favor of O’Bannon, but did not completely remove the limits that the NCAA places on athlete compensation according to their rules of collegiate amateurism. The judge did not want athletes to have the ability to endorse products, so her solution to this issue was to raise the stipend cap from $2000 to $5000. The decision was later brought to the attention of the United States Court of Appeals for the Ninth Circuit by the NCAA, where the court solidified a 2-1 decision, partially affirmed and partially reversing the lower court's ruling. The court agreed with the judge that the NCAA amateurism rules violated antitrust laws, but it took away both the trust fund and stipend beyond the cost of attendance. The reasoning for this ruling was to ensure that cash compensation not related to education did not damage the status of student-athletes as amateurs.

A bill has been proposed in California for student-athletes to profit off their image and likeness from endorsements without losing their athletic scholarship or eligibility. It is Senate Bill 206 (SB 206) or the Fair Pay to Play Act. State Senators Nancy Skinner and Steven Bradford introduced the bill. Lebron James took to Twitter to back this bill, tweeting that it was a "GAME CHANGER". The bill will allow student-athletes in the state of California to use their platform and sport to make their own money. It also allows student-athletes to hire attorneys or agents for any business deal without losing their scholarship or eligibility. Governor Newsom signed this into law on September 30, 2019. It will go into effect in January 2023. Washington state, Oregon, and a number of other states introduced a similar bill; even though the bills have not been passed yet, they have received recognition.

Chloe V. Mitchell, a volleyball player at Aquinas College in Grand Rapids, Michigan, was one of the first collegiate athletes to create, post, and monetize her brand on social media.

In October 2020, the NAIA began allowing athletes to capitalize in the emerging market for college athletes on names, images and likenesses. Mitchell is already a seasoned veteran of social media with 2.5 million followers on TikTok, 41,000 followers on Instagram, and 5,400 fans on YouTube. Known as the “She Shed” maven, she has also co-founded the NIL platform Playbooked, in which she launched her first promotion, called D.I.Y.-A Gift for Dad. In the video, she promotes two different kinds of golf putters that her company has partnered with. Bundling her skills through creating new environments, she “activates” the golf partnership by designing an in-home miniature golf course.

In June 2021, following the United States Supreme Court's ruling in NCAA v. Alston, the NCAA allowed collegiate athletes to be compensated on their name, imagine, and likeness (NIL) through contact with third-party organizations. Later, a court settlement in June 2025 stemming from House v. NCAA introduced revenue-sharing between athletic departments and student-athletes, allowing schools to directly pay athletes for the first time.

=== Official Amateurism Regulations: NCAA Bylaw 12 ===
The below guidelines are some of the current NCAA regulations under Bylaw 12, which shape the current rules for an amateur collegiate athlete and the institutions that manage them. These rules are related to the current controversy of how much financial compensation a student-athlete should be entitled to being able to receive. These guidelines can be found in the NCAA Division 1 Manual, which is updated on a yearly basis and has been utilized since the organization's inception:

==== 12.1.2 ====
Athletes are stripped of their amateur status and therefore their right to participate within NCAA sporting events if they receive payment for their athletic skills.

==== 12.5.1.1 ====
The physical appearance, name, and pictures of a student-athlete can be used by the institution that he/she attends for both charitable and educational purposes. Items that do not single out one particular athlete's name or physical likeness can be sold by the institution or its outlets. Items containing one student-athlete can only be used for informational purposes.

==== 12.5.2.1 ====
A student-athlete will lose their ability to participate in NCAA sporting events if they are discovered to be receiving payment through commercial advertisement, promotion, or endorsement.

==== 12.5.2.2 ====
The names and pictures of student-athletes are to be made both aware and requested for use before they are utilized by a student-athlete or institution. It is the responsibility of both the student-athlete and the institution that this requirement is followed.

== Claimed benefits ==
Being an amateur collegiate athlete allows many students an opportunity to attend an institution that provides higher education that they otherwise may not be able to receive. The rules and approach to amateurism is said to ensure that the athletes are students first, thus protecting education as the primary reason for attending a college or university. The NCAA publicly reiterates their belief that their athletes are scholars first and athletes second, thus being student-athletes. The fear that the NCAA holds about compensating their student-athletes beyond the cost of attendance is the possible blurring of the line between professional and collegiate sports.

The NCAA utilizes the Professional and Amateur Sports Protection Act, which was passed in 1992. The purpose of this act is to protect student-athletes from some of the pressures of professional sports by halting the spread of state-sponsored sports gambling. The act protects the status of student-athletes as amateurs free from the corruption that comes with sports gambling. Participation in these gambling organizations are therefore prohibited. However, due to student-athletes being restricted from financial payment beyond what the NCAA allows, student-athletes are said to be more prone to take part in these illegal practices compared to professionals who do not have the same financial limitations.

Amateurism also helps to protect fair competition and the pro-competitiveness of collegiate sports. In the case of NCAA v. Smith, the emphasis on amateurism and its effects on fair competition is carried out through its ruling. The case involves a volleyball player that was stripped of her remaining years of eligibility due to her enrollment in a post-graduate institution that was separate from her undergraduate university where the eligibility was being used. The NCAA does not want post-graduate recruiting to be allowed. This prevents premier athletic institutions from using an ability to place their student-athletes in postgraduate programs outside of their institutions as a tool to further incentivize prospective athletes to join their program. The Board of Regents stated that the regulatory controls of the NCAA act to stimulate competition between athletic programs and further solidify collegiate sports as pro-competitive by enhancing the public's interest in collegiate sport.

== Claimed disadvantages ==
Both collegiate and Olympic athletes are considered amateur athletes. Unlike Olympic athletes, NCAA student-athletes did not have a right to receive payment for their public likeness. It is due to the NCAA's definition of amateurism that collegiate athletes do not have this right. An example of this can be seen in the case of Jeremy Bloom v. NCAA. Jeremy Bloom was an Olympic skier who had opportunities to receive endorsement deals for his skiing ability, but could not do so if he wished to be eligible to participate as an amateur collegiate athlete. Since NIL payments were allowed, more Olympians have participated in college athletics, most notably in gymnastics, where many competitors at international levels compete in college gymnastics either concurrent to or after their elite careers.

There have been other cases where the controversy has been in regards to athletes' rights to their public likeness. In the recent O'Bannon v. NCAA case, the allegation is in regards to student-athletes having an income level of zero for the use of their public likeness; the allegation is that the NCAA is in violation of Section 1 of the Sherman Antitrust Act due to the restriction of payment to student-athletes for their public likeness. In the Gertz v. Robert Welch, Inc. case, it is argued that student-athletes have a right to endorsements and other commercial promotional opportunities due to their status as public figures. It is stated within this case that public figures by definition are those with “pervasive fame or notoriety”, which many claim student-athletes to possess.

Another prohibition from the rules of amateurism that both student-athletes and coaches are impacted by is their inability to negotiate for compensation beyond the cost of tuition. In the Southeastern Conference, multiple football programs had come up with a stipend plan that would have been used to create more incentive for better-quality players to attend their university. Due to the rules of amateurism, this plan was not able to be carried out. The plan is claimed to have potentially produced more quality teams to better compete, thus stimulating increased fan satisfaction.

== Northwestern Football unionization efforts ==
One of the most notable challenges to the concept of amateurism began at Northwestern University in 2013. A group led by Northwestern Quarterback Kain Colter and Ramogi Huma, executive director of the freshly formed College Athletes Players Association (CAPA), set out to advocate for the rights of the modern college athlete. Together they testified in hearings before the National Labor Relations Board (NLRB) in February 2014; the Chicago division of the NLRB ruled on March 26, 2014 that the demands and expectations required of the athletes in question qualify them as employees. Thus, they were entitled to the right to unionize and the opportunity to bargain for improved working conditions.

At the center of the debate was whether or not NCAA student-athletes should be classified as employees of the university. According to the initial NLRB ruling, key factors in their decision included the highly lucrative economy that Division I College Football produces and the demands and regulations instilled by the athletic department and coaching staff. Furthermore, despite NCAA’s long standing claim that college athletes are students first, via the term “student-athlete” and the “amateurism” system, the CAPA argument was built upon comparing the demands of big time college athletics to a typical American workday:

“The players spend 50 to 60 hours per week on their football duties during a one-month training camp prior to the start of the academic year and an additional 40 to 50 hours per week on those duties during the three- or four-month football season. Not only is this more hours than many undisputed full-time employees work at their jobs, it is also many more hours than the players spend on their studies.”

In the aftermath of the NLRB Chicago ruling, Northwestern University stated that they would appeal the decision to a five-member NLRB board in Washington. Furthermore, the NCAA also immediately condemned the decision: “We strongly disagree with the notion that student-athletes are employees,” Donald Remy, the N.C.A.A.’s chief legal officer, wrote.” Furthermore, President of the NCAA Mark Emmert came out with a notably strong stance: “the notion of using a union-employee model to address the challenges that do exist in intercollegiate athletics is something that strikes most people as a grossly inappropriate solution to the problem.”

At the time, Mark Emmert was also dealing with several other public relation battles, including the repercussions from the Ed O’Bannon trial, in which the NCAA was accused of profiting directly off the likeness of their student-athletes. During the end of 2014, the NCAA moved to make several reforms including improved protections for athletic scholarships and monthly stipends for student-athletes to cover the cost of living expenses.

On August 17, 2015, the NLRB unanimously voted to reverse the decision, noting several key reasons why classifying scholarship football players as employees of their respective universities would not lead to stable, equitable labor improvements for NCAA athletes throughout the country. One main issue was that the NLRB only has jurisdiction over private entities, and although Northwestern University is a private institution, it would be far too logistically difficult to apply these standards to schools throughout the country:

“In particular, of the roughly 125 colleges and universities that participate in FBS football, all but 17 are state-run institutions. As a result, the Board cannot assert jurisdiction over the vast majority of FBS teams because they are not operated by “employers” within the meaning of Section 2(2) of the Act...More starkly, Northwestern is the only private school that is a member of the Big Ten, and thus the Board cannot assert jurisdiction over any of Northwestern’s primary competitors”.

Finally, the NLRB Washington committee concluded in their formal hearing that “There is thus a symbiotic relationship among the various teams, the conferences, and the NCAA”. As a result, labor issues directly involving only an individual team and its players would also affect the NCAA, the Big Ten, and the other member institutions. Consequently, “it would be difficult to imagine any degree of stability in labor relations”.

In response to the NLRB overturning the decision, Ramogi Huma expressed his displeasure with the outcome, but made it clear this was not the end of the road: “It’s notable they didn’t rule that players aren’t employees,” he said. “The door is still open.”

== See also ==
- 2017–18 NCAA Division I men's basketball corruption scandal
- O'Bannon v. NCAA
- Southern Methodist University football scandal
