= Tariffs, Blockades, and Inflation =

Book by Mark Thornton and Robert Ekelund

Tariffs, Blockades, and Inflation: The Economics of the Civil War
- Author: Mark Thornton, Robert Ekelund
- Language: English
- Publisher: Rowman & Littlefield Publishers
- Publication date: 2004
- Pages: 116
- ISBN: 978-0842029612
- OCLC: 688645943

Tariffs, Blockades, and Inflation: The Economics of the Civil War is an economics book written by Mark Thornton and Robert Ekelund. The book, written from an Austrian School viewpoint, covers the socioeconomic situations of the American Civil War.
