= War, Wine, and Taxes: The Political Economy of Anglo-French Trade, 1689–1900 =

2007 book by John V. C. Nye

- Cover
- Author: John V. C. Nye
- Language: English
- Series: The Princeton Economic History of the Western World
- Subject: Economic history, British trade policy, Anglo-French trade relations
- Genre: Economic history
- Publisher: Princeton University Press
- Publication date: 2007
- Publication place: United States
- Pages: 174
- ISBN: 978-0-691-12917-4

War, Wine, and Taxes: The Political Economy of Anglo-French Trade, 1689–1900 is a 2007 book by economic historian John V. C. Nye, published by Princeton University Press as part of its Princeton Economic History of the Western World series. Nye argues that Britain maintained higher average tariff rates than France throughout most of the nineteenth century, challenging the conventional characterization of Britain as the pioneer of free trade and France as protectionist. Nye traces British trade policy from the Glorious Revolution of 1689 to 1900, focusing on how prohibitive tariffs on French wine, brandy, and other imported wine and alcohol protected British brewing interests and enabled the government to impose heavy excise taxes on domestic beer production. The author contends that Britain did not become a genuine free trader until after the Anglo-French Commercial Treaty of 1860, and that British trade liberalization resulted from domestic fiscal considerations rather than ideological commitment to free trade principles. Nye's thesis has generated substantial scholarly debate, particularly regarding his use of average tariff rates as measures of protectionism and his interpretation of wine duties as protective rather than revenue-generating instruments.

== Summary ==
The work is a systematic challenge to conventional narratives about nineteenth-century trade liberalization. Economic historian Nye employs quantitative analysis of tariff data to demonstrate that Britain maintained higher average tariff rates than France throughout most of the nineteenth century, contradicting the established characterization of Britain as the pioneer of free trade and France as protectionist.

Nye studies the origins of British trade policy to the conflicts between England and France beginning with the Glorious Revolution of 1689. He argues that the Wars of the League of Augsburg (1689-1697) and Spanish Succession (1701-1714) created opportunities for British protectionists to impose prohibitive tariffs on French imports, particularly wine. These measures, initially conceived as economic warfare, evolved into a sophisticated fiscal system that fundamentally shaped both nations' economic development.

Nye's thesis hinges on the relationship between wine tariffs and domestic excise taxes on beer. The virtual prohibition of cheaper French wines through volume-based tariffs—which by the 1690s had reduced French wine from over 70 percent of British wine imports to approximately 3 percent by the 1720s—protected British brewers from foreign competition. This protection enabled the state to impose increasingly heavy excise taxes on domestic beer production without fear of consumer substitution to imported alternatives. By the 1780s, taxes on alcoholic beverages accounted for nearly 40 percent of British government revenue, with beer-related excises contributing the largest share.

Nye investigates how this fiscal arrangement influenced industrial organization. He documents the consolidation of the British brewing industry into an oligopolistic structure centered in London, where a handful of large porter breweries dominated production by the late eighteenth century. This was in contrast to the 1600s, when the government encouraged small retail brewing believing that this would raise revenue, but that was not the case. The government's ability to collect excise taxes efficiently depended on this concentration, creating mutual dependence between the state and brewing interests. The import restrictions were the carrot to promote compliance with government taxation, and the monopolistic arrangements made it easier to promote cooperation between large brewers and the state. The failed Walpole excise reform of 1733, which attempted to replace customs duties with domestic excises on wine and tobacco, illustrates the political constraints this system imposed on fiscal reform.

Nye's quantitative analysis reveals that Britain's average tariff rates (measured as customs revenue divided by total import value) exceeded those of France from the 1820s through the 1870s. He addresses the methodological critique that such measures fail to distinguish between revenue and protective tariffs by demonstrating that British wine duties, though imposed on a product Britain did not produce, effectively protected domestic brewing interests and thus functioned as protective rather than purely revenue-generating measures.

Recognizing the limitations of average tariff rates as a measure of protectionism, Nye conducted additional robustness calculations using more sophisticated metrics. He examined the scholarly literature on trade restrictiveness indices, particularly Anderson and Neary's Trade Restrictiveness Index (TRI) published in Econometrica, though he noted that even this measure fails to account for the market power of dominant economies like Britain. To address these methodological concerns, Nye developed his own rigorous comparative analysis of British and French tariffs, published in a separate article that formed the basis for the book's technical appendix. This analysis demonstrated that his core findings about relative British protectionism remained robust under alternative measurement approaches.

The study identifies the Anglo-French Commercial Treaty of 1860 (Cobden-Chevalier Treaty) as the watershed moment in European trade liberalization, arguing that this bilateral agreement, rather than Britain's unilateral repeal of the Corn Laws in 1846, catalyzed the creation of a European free trade network. The treaty reduced British wine duties and shifted their basis from volume to alcoholic content, removing discrimination against lighter French wines. Following the treaty, British imports of French wine increased 600 percent, while a series of most-favored-nation agreements rapidly extended tariff reductions throughout Europe. This view of trade promotion through reciprocal tariffs and bilateral agreements is also supported by the work of the political scientist Robert Pahre.

Nye's interpretation challenges hegemonic stability theory, which portrays Britain as exercising economic leadership in promoting global free trade. He contends that Britain failed to lead when European free trade was emerging in the 1860s and proved unable to prevent its collapse when France and Germany adopted protectionist policies in the 1890s. British trade liberalization, he argues, resulted from domestic fiscal considerations and bilateral negotiations rather than ideological commitment or hegemonic leadership.

The work includes technical appendixes employing computable general equilibrium models to assess the welfare effects of British tariffs. These simulations, developed with Sami Dakhlia and published in a peer-reviewed article, suggest that British tariffs in 1841 and 1854 were farther from optimal levels than French tariffs. The CGE analysis demonstrates that unilateral tariff reductions would have yielded greater welfare gains for Britain than for France, supporting Nye's contention that Britain was more protectionist than France during this period. This rigorous quantitative approach addresses critics' concerns about the reliability of average tariff rates as measures of protectionism.

The book's political economy implications extend beyond trade policy to broader questions of state formation, fiscal capacity, and economic development. Nye demonstrates how initial protectionist measures designed for wartime revenue generation created entrenched domestic coalitions that shaped British political economy for over a century. The brewing industry's oligopolistic structure, reinforced by the fiscal system, illustrates how temporary policies can generate path-dependent institutional arrangements with lasting consequences. The work challenges conventional narratives about the relationship between economic ideology and policy outcomes, showing how Britain's rhetorical commitment to free trade coexisted with protective practices, while France's protectionist discourse masked relatively liberal trade policies.

== Methodology ==
A central methodological contribution of Nye's work addresses the challenge of measuring and comparing protectionism across countries. While the book initially employs average tariff rates (customs revenue divided by total import value) as a standard metric used in historical trade studies, Nye acknowledges this measure's limitations and subjects his thesis to extensive robustness testing.

The book engages with the broader scholarly debate over trade restrictiveness measurement, noting that the field remains divided on optimal approaches. Nye examines Anderson and Neary's Trade Restrictiveness Index (TRI), widely considered the most rigorous theoretical measure, but identifies its failure to account for the market power effects of large economies like nineteenth-century Britain. In response, Nye developed alternative calculations that incorporate general equilibrium effects and market power considerations.

The technical appendix presents computable general equilibrium (CGE) models created with Sami Dakhlia, demonstrating that British tariffs in 1841 and 1854 were farther from optimal levels than French tariffs. These simulations show that a unilateral reduction in tariffs would have generated greater welfare gains for Britain than for France, supporting the book's central claim about relative protectionism independent of the specific measurement approach employed.

== Critical reception ==
Nye's thesis has generated substantial scholarly debate, particularly regarding methodology and measurement. While critics have questioned the use of average tariff rates, supporters note that Nye's analysis extends well beyond this simple metric to include sophisticated econometric modeling and careful consideration of alternative measures of trade restrictiveness. The debate has contributed to broader discussions in economic history about how to measure and compare trade policies across different institutional contexts.

Nye's thesis has generated substantial scholarly debate. Critics have questioned whether average tariff rates adequately measure protectionism and whether wine duties truly constituted protection in an economic sense. Nevertheless, the work has fundamentally challenged historians to reconsider the standard narrative of nineteenth-century trade policy and to examine more carefully the interconnections between fiscal needs, domestic political economy, and international commerce in the development of modern trade regimes.

Anthony Howe acknowledged that while "the Nye thesis is beset with difficulties," the work possessed "notable strengths." Howe praised the work as "the first substantial attempt to analyse the importance of the wine duties to the fiscal-military state," and noted that Nye "makes his case with elegance and economy." However, he criticized Nye for paying insufficient attention to the brewing industry's response to the removal of protections in the 1860s and for not adequately explaining why French leaders failed to recognize the liberalization of their own tariff policies before 1860. He concluded that readers willing to accept Nye's contention that trade policy should be assessed "not by contemporary perceptions but by the 'retroactive tools of discovery'" would find the book more rewarding than those with broader historical interests.

Michael S. Smith found Nye's arguments provocative but ultimately unconvincing. Smith acknowledged that Nye had "largely made good on his promise in the introduction to provoke thinking on a number of important historical issues," but doubted that many economic historians would accept Nye's claim to be initiating "a fundamental reassessment of our understanding of commercial policy in economic history." Smith particularly criticized Nye's reliance on average tariff rates as poor indicators of protectionism and found the technical appendix employing computer simulations to be "highly theoretical, and largely incomprehensible to noneconomists." He suggested that Nye's emphasis on proving British protectionism distracted from the valuable insights about eighteenth-century mercantilism.

Mark Thornton said the book showed "that England was a late comer to free trade while France was a relative trail blazer," though he noted this "modification does not change the overall historical story." He liked Nye's explanation of how the English could be economically successful yet "relatively backward in the areas of fine foods and beverages" while the French, though economically stagnant, built "their reputation for the finest gourmet foods and beverages." Thornton expressed surprise that Nye, as holder of the Frédéric Bastiat Chair in Political Economy, had "hardly mentioned" Bastiat's role in French tariff reduction campaigns of the 1840s.

Jonathan J. Liebowitz, from the University of Massachusetts Lowell, characterized the book as containing "provocative" arguments that "some of our fundamental beliefs about economic history are inadequate or just plain wrong." Liebowitz found Nye's analysis of how prohibitive tariffs on French wine shaped British consumption patterns compelling, and noted that "the English taste for these last two beverages [beer and gin] was thus not a genetic predisposition but arose from the absence of French wines 'at the very moment in history when mass consumer tastes were formed.'" Liebowitz appreciated Nye's use of economic evidence from earlier scholars but questioned whether tariffs should be neatly categorized as either protective or revenue-generating.

Jeff Horn, from Manhattan College, expressed sympathy with some of Nye's conclusions but regarded them as "unproven," finding himself "deeply troubled by the way Nye built his arguments." Horn criticized Nye for claiming originality while omitting "major recent works on the subject," particularly Will Ashworth's study on customs and excise that "put forward most of Nye's key arguments." Horn noted that despite the subtitle, "this book is not really about France," citing the absence of French-language sources and "spelling errors" in French documents. He suggested that "a longer book—this one is only 140 pages of text including the appendix—giving fuller treatment to and greater support for the chief claims and engaging the relevant literature thoroughly would have allowed Nye to make his case more convincingly."

James Shepherd, from Whitman College, praised it as an "excellent research monograph". Shepherd noted that while some of the research had appeared previously in journal articles, "it is most conveniently combined in this book." He emphasized that "of most interest to readers of this journal perhaps will be the author's emphasis upon the trade in French wine, and the protectionist actions of Britain against French wine, even through much of the nineteenth century."
