= Auernheimer =

Auernheimer is a Jewish surname. Notable people with the surname include:

- Leonardo Auernheimer (1936–2010), Argentinian economist
- Raoul Auernheimer (1876–1948), Austrian jurist and writer
- Andrew Auernheimer (born 1985), American hacker and neo-Nazi internet troll
