= The Myth of American Inequality =

2022 book

- Author: Phil Gramm, Robert Ekelund, John Early
- Publication date: 2022

The Myth of American Inequality is a 2022 book about American economics which asserts that "the federal government egregiously overstates the degree of inequality and poverty" in America. The book says that after transfers and taxes “the average household in the bottom, second, and middle quintiles all have roughly the same incomes—despite dramatic differences in work effort.” It was written by Phil Gramm, Robert Ekelund, and John Early; was named a Wall Street Journal Best Book of 2022; and won the 2024 Hayek Prize.

A Wall Street Journal book review by Charles W. Calomiris says:

Government statistical reports exclude “noncash” sources of income, which excludes most transfers from social programs. Taxes (paid disproportionately by high earners) are also ignored in official calculations.

and

Real income of the bottom quintile, the authors write, grew more than 681% from 1967 to 2017. The percentage of people living in poverty fell from 32% in 1947 to 15% in 1967 to only 1.1% in 2017.

George F. Will wrote:

He demonstrates that the nation's condition is much better than it is portrayed by numbers misused to advance political agendas.

== See also ==
- Poverty in America
- Measuring poverty
- Income inequality
