= Robert Ekelund =

American economist (1940–2023)

Robert Burton Ekelund Jr.
- Born: September 20, 1940; Galveston, Texas, U.S.
- Died: August 17, 2023 (aged 82)

Academic background
- Education: St. Mary's University, Texas; Louisiana State University

Academic work
- Discipline: Applied and cultural economics
- Institutions: Auburn University
- Website: Information at IDEAS / RePEc

Robert Burton Ekelund Jr. (September 20, 1940 – August 17, 2023) was an American economist.

== Early life and education ==
Born on Galveston Island, Texas, Ekelund attended St. Mary's University in San Antonio, Texas, earning his BBA in economics in 1962 and his MA in economics and history the next year. He was a member of the Order of the Barons and first worked as an instructor in economics while completing his master's degree.

Ekelund then moved to Baton Rouge, Louisiana, to teach and continue his graduate work at Louisiana State University. He finished his PhD in economics and political theory there in 1967. His doctoral dissertation was on Jules Dupuit, a French civil engineer and economist. Ekelund maintained this interest in Dupuit, making him the topic of a dozen journal articles and a 1999 book, Secret Origins of Modern Microeconomics: Dupuit and the Engineers.

== Career ==
In 1967, after the completion of his PhD, Ekelund was hired by Texas A&M University economics department, where he became Director of Graduate Students. He was made Professor of Economics in 1974. His students at Texas A&M included future Texas politicians Chet Edwards and Rick Perry.

In 1979, Ekelund moved to Auburn, Alabama to become a professor at Auburn University, where he was the first Director of Graduate Students in economics, for Auburn's new PhD program. Over the course of his academic career, he directed over 50 doctoral dissertations and dozens of master's theses. His students included Donald J. Boudreaux. Ekelund was a visiting scholar at the Hoover Institution at Stanford University, and in 2003 he served as the Vernon Taylor Distinguished Visiting Professor at Trinity University in San Antonio, Texas. Ekelund was also a policy advisor to the Heartland Institute, an Independent Institute research fellow, and an adjunct faculty member of the Mises Institute. Ekelund retired from Auburn University in 2003, becoming the Catherine and Edward Lowder Eminent Scholar Emeritus.

Over the course of his career, Ekelund authored over two dozen books, and over 200 academic papers.

== Significance in economics ==
Economic topics notably discussed by Ekelund include cultural economics, the history of economic thought, the economics of regulation, the economics of religion, public choice theory, mercantilism, and the economics of the American Civil War blockades.

Textbooks by Ekelund have sold successfully with his and Robert Tollison's basic book, "Economics" reached its seventh edition. The history of economic theory and its relevance to contemporary economic theory and policy was one of Ekelund's primary interests. His book with Robert Hebert, "A History of Economic Theory and Method" has entered its sixth edition and has been in continuous publication for five decades. The book illustrates how models can facilitate the analysis of economic theory as well as its interaction with both ancient and contemporary psychology, sociology, anthropology, and culture. This book, with various editions translated into five languages, remains a primary source in the development of modern economic theory.

His interests in the economics of regulation were combined with Sir Edwin Chadwick's historical study in 2012. Chadwick's sophisticated 19th-century conceptions of moral hazard, common pool problems, asymmetric information, and theory of "competition for the field" of service (franchising) were pioneering concepts in contemporary theory but were only rediscovered in the second half of the 20th century. Ekelund along with E. O. Price chronicled these stark innovations in a recent book entitled The Economics of Edwin Chadwick: Incentives Matter. According to Professor Sam Peltzman of the University of Chicago, "Economists owe a great debt to Ekelund and Price for making us aware of Edwin Chadwick's seminal contributions. Chadwick lived in the middle of the 19th century, but he anticipated many of the theoretical and practical advances that culminated in the law and economics revolution of the late 20th century. These include Coase's analysis of social cost and Demsetz's proposal for franchise bidding in natural monopolies. Read the summary of Chadwick's ideas about railroads and consider that Britain adopted many of them but only more than a century later. The book is full of similar examples where Chadwick's prescience is extraordinary. Economists, legal scholars and practitioners, especially those working at the intersection of law and economics, will want to read this book."

Ekelund's 1981 book with Tollison, Mercantilism as a Rent-Seeking Society, is cited as an exemplar of the school of thought that argues that mercantilism, rather than being the result of miscalculation, was a system designed by rent-seekers to enforce public policy favorable towards themselves.

=== Dupuit and the French engineers ===
His 1999 collaboration with Hébert, Secret Origins of Modern Microeconomics, has been praised for publicizing the theoretical and applied achievements of Jules Dupuit and others whose work in economics was often previously overlooked as mere engineering literature. In his review, economist Marcel Boumans of the University of Amsterdam asserts, "For too long they were neglected in the history of economics. Ekelund and Hebert's tribute to their work remedies this shortcoming." According to a July 1999 book review in the American Journal of Economics and Sociology,

The book succeeds in staking out a claim for Dupuit as one of the founders of formal economic theory and reasoning. This is a stellar performance and a book that will shake up the historiography of the discipline for decades to come. At future professional meetings we shall debate the origins of modern neoclassical economics: British or French?

According to Nicos Theocarakis of the University of Athens,

This is a beauty of a book! Erudite, well-researched, with a detailed knowledge of the primary sources, original, and high on economic analysis. This is not a book for the faint-hearted. It requires a good knowledge of economic theory and an interest in the History of Ideas. It also gives a first rate account of the history of the period and the history of institutions in pre- and post-revolutionary France that have created this strange beast: the French engineer whose skills made him attack from a formal and theoretical viewpoint practical problems. It certainly puts modern neoclassical microeconomics in a historical perspective. . . . A must for anyone with a serious interest in the subject!

=== Economics of religion ===
Sacred Trust and The Marketplace of Christianity have both spawned debate among those interested in one of the latest new "fields" in economics—the economics of religion. Economist John Wells argues in his March 1998 Journal of Markets and Morality review of Sacred Trust that,

The upshot from each of the chapters is that the Church consistently sought after profits and responded to economic incentives in a manner consonant with modern economic analysis. Taken as a whole, they propose numerous challenges to those who maintain a public-interest approach to Church history.

In his Chronicle of Higher Education review of The Marketplace of Christianity, David Glenn notes that arguments in the book that Westerners have demanded "cheaper" religions over time are at odds with assertions by economist Laurence R. Iannaccone that "strict churches are strong." Barry R. Chiswick in his 2009 review of the book in the Journal of Economic Literature, notes that Ekelund and his cohorts use income, education, the state of science and full price of alternative religious beliefs to predict the types of religions chosen. Factors affecting demand and risk profiles between mainline Protestant religions, on the one hand, and fundamentalist and traditionalist Roman Catholics, on the other relate

...to the issues of sex, including sexual behavior and identity (e.g., premarital sex, homosexuality and procreation (e.g., birth control, abortion). These issues are dividing Christianity within the developed countries, and between Christians in the developed and less-developed countries. It is because of sharp differences in views on these issues and doctrinal rigidity that schisms have emerged in some Protestant denominations and [the authors] predict a schism (or several schisms) in the Roman Catholic Church. These schisms, responding to heterogeneous demanders, increase the extent of product differentiation in this market.

Chiswick concludes that schisms are beneficial and that "[t]hese ideas seem to be particularly relevant in the current period where religious fundamentalism and liberalism/individualism are clashing to various degrees in all the world's religions. The application of microeconomic theory that is so successfully applied here to one major development in Christianity can, in principle, be applied to these other religions as well."

Building upon previous research Ekelund and Robert Tollison's "prequel" entitled Economic Origins of Roman Christianity draws upon the economics of networking, entrepreneurship, and industrial organization to explain Christianity's rapid ascent in the presence of Jewish and pagan competitors. The book introduces St. Paul as an entrepreneur, Constantine as a political strategist and the Merovingian and Carolingian monarchs as players with the Roman papacy to enhance the church's power and dominance over much of Western Europe—culminating in a virtual monopoly during the high Middle Ages. According to Professor Rachel M. McCleary of the John F. Kennedy School of Government at Harvard University, Economic Origins is "An engrossing and insightful account of the branding of early Christianity through entrepreneurship, networking, manipulation of civil governments, and the control of entry into the Roman religion market. This is a major contribution to the study of religion, giving us a fresh, analytical approach to early Christianity and how it became the powerful medieval church."

=== Cultural economics ===
The interface between culture and economics, including the study of specific markets and institutions relating to art and museums, caught the interest of economists, including Ekelund, decades ago. Economist David Throsby established "cultural economics" in the hierarchy of the American Economic Association's index of topics considered "economics" in 1994. Ekelund has been associated with such studies for several decades, conducting studies with colleagues in the late 20th and early 21st centuries using a small auction sample of Latin American art. Later, with colleagues and an acute interest in American art, he analyzed a database of 14,000 observations on 80 American artists born in the 19th and 20th centuries. A series of contributions was followed by a book, The Economics of American Art: Issues, Artists and Market Institutions, published in 2017. The book studies a number of critical issues including (a) how the market for American art developed historically from colonial times to the present; (b) how the age of an American artist is related to her productivity; (c) how returns to art investment in the pre-1950 and contemporary periods compare to other types of investments; (d) the economic underpinnings of art crime, such as theft and the creation of fakes; and (e) how the "bubble" observed in art markets is facilitated by the institutions through which art is marketed.

David Throsby of Macquarie University comments that

the book is an exemplary illustration of the way in which economics, when competently and sensitively applied, can illuminate important aspects of the role of art in human affairs.

Kathryn Graddy of Brandeis University and editor of the Journal of Cultural Economics, argues that the authors' approach is

unique … and should be of keen interest to collectors of American art, firms interest in art as an investment, and students that are interested in both American Art and the economics surrounding the sales of art.

Ekelund, in addition to his studies of art and economics, has also analyzed some of the economic factors affecting museums, including contemporary art bubbles and attendance related to the business cycle, and studied the effect of the hypothetical elimination of the National Endowment for the Arts on museums and the arts generally.

== Fine arts ==
In addition to his work in economics, Ekelund was an artist, whose work was shown regularly in juried and other shows during the latter two decades of his life, with solo and joint exhibitions in Alabama. Ekelund also designed book covers for the University of Chicago Press and Edward Elgar Publishing in London. He was an avid art collector and curator whose collection has been exhibited in several museums. He was a founding member of the advisory board for the Jule Collins Smith Museum of Fine Art in Auburn, Alabama and was the museum's acting co-director from 2006 to 2007 and chairman of the Advisory Board from 2010 to 2012.

Ekelund was also an accomplished pianist, having been classically trained since childhood, and recorded five albums: Solace (also called For the Piano); Reverie; Bach, Beethoven, Brahms; Musical Idioms; and Reflections on Childhood, which featured his performances of works by Bach, Chopin, Mozart, Beethoven, Brahms, Schumann, Debussy, Ravel, Grieg, Griffes, Scott Joplin, Turina, Granados, Gershwin, and others. He was a contestant in the 2008, 2009, 2012, and 2014 Van Cliburn Amateur Competition, and he created an homage to Chopin's 200th birthday. Many piano works, including his Van Cliburn entries, appear on his YouTube channel.

== Personal life and death ==
Ekelund was a keen cook and gastronome, and was a partner in the award-winning Greenhouse Restaurant in Opelika, which operated from 1979 to 1993. He also enjoyed gardening, and was selected for the Auburn tour of beautiful yards.

Robert Ekelund died on August 17, 2023, at the age of 82, after a years-long battle with Parkinson's disease, and later cancer. He was survived by his husband, Mark Thornton.

== Books ==
As author

- A History of Economic Theory and Method with Robert F. Hébert. (available in Spanish, Serbo-Croatian, Chinese, and Portuguese editions), McGraw-Hill, 1st edition, 1975. Sixth edition (Waveland Press, 2014, ISBN 1-4786-0638-X).
- Mercantilism as a Rent-Seeking Society: Economic Regulation in Historical Perspective with Robert Tollison. Texas A&M University Press, 1981.
- The Essentials of Money and Banking with Leonardo Auernheimer. John Wiley & Sons, 1982.
- Macroeconomics with Charles DeLorme. Business Publications, 1983.
- Economics: Private Markets and Public Choice with Robert Tollison. Little, Brown, and Company, 1986. (7th Edition. Addison-Wesley-Longman, 2006. ISBN 0-321-33630-5)
- Advertising and the Market Process: A Modern Economic View with David Saurman. Pacific Institute, 1988.
- A History of Economic Theory and Method, with Robert F. Hébert, New York: McGraw-Hill, 1990
- Intermediate Macroeconomics with Charles D. DeLorme and Dennis Jansen. West Educational Publishing, 1994.
- Intermediate Microeconomics: Price Theory and Applications with Richard Ault. D. C. Heath, 1995.
- Classics in Economic Thought with Robert F. Hébert. McGraw-Hill, 1996.
- Politicized Economies: Monarchy, Monopoly, and Mercantilism with Robert Tollison. Texas A&M University Press, 1997. (ISBN 0-8909-6745-8)
- Secret Origins of Modern Microeconomics: Dupuit and the Engineers with Robert F. Hébert. University of Chicago Press, March 1999. (ISBN 0-2261-9999-1)
- Sacred Trust: The Medieval Church as an Economic Firm with Robert F. Hébert, Robert Tollison, Gary Anderson, and Audrey Davidson. Oxford University Press, 2003. (ISBN 0-1951-0337-8)
- Tariffs, Blockades, and Inflation: The Economics of the Civil War with Mark Thornton. Scholarly Resource Books, 2004. (ISBN 0-8420-2961-3)
- The Persistence of Myth and Tragedy in Twentieth-Century Mexican Art with Catherine Walsh. Taylor Museum of Art, 2004.
- The Marketplace of Christianity with Robert F. Hébert and Robert D. Tollison. (available in Italian) MIT Press, November 2006. (ISBN 0-2620-5082-X)
- Economic Origins of Roman Christianity with Robert D. Tollison. University of Chicago Press, 2011. (ISBN 0-226-20002-7)
- The Economics of Edwin Chadwick with Edward. O. Price, III. Edward Elgar, 2012. (ISBN 978-1-78100-503-3)
- The Economics of American Art: Issues, Artists and Market Institutions with John D. Jackson and Robert Tollison. Oxford University Press, 2017. (ISBN 0190657898)
- The Myth of American Inequality: How Government Biases Policy Debate with Phil Gramm and John Early. Rowman and Littlefield Publishers, 2022. (ISBN 1538167387)

As editor

- The Evolution of Modern Demand Theory: A Collection of Essays with Eirik G. Furubotn and W. P. Gramm. D. C. Heath and Co., 1972
- The Foundations of Regulatory Economics in 3 volumes. Edward Elgar, 1988.
