= Mark Thornton =

American economist (born 1960)

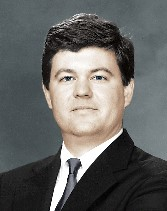
- Born: June 7, 1960 (age 66); United States
- Political party: Libertarian

Academic background
- Education: St. Bonaventure University (BS); Auburn University (PhD)
- Influences: Frederic Bastiat; Ludwig von Mises; Murray Rothbard; Lew Rockwell

Academic work
- Discipline: Economic history; political economy; prohibitionism; history of economic thought
- School or tradition: Austrian School
- Website: Information at IDEAS / RePEc

Mark Thornton (born June 7, 1960) is an American economist of the Austrian School. He has written on the topic of prohibition of drugs, the economics of the American Civil War, and the "Skyscraper Index". He is a Senior Fellow with the Ludwig von Mises Institute in Alabama and a Research Fellow with the Independent Institute.

== Life and academic career ==
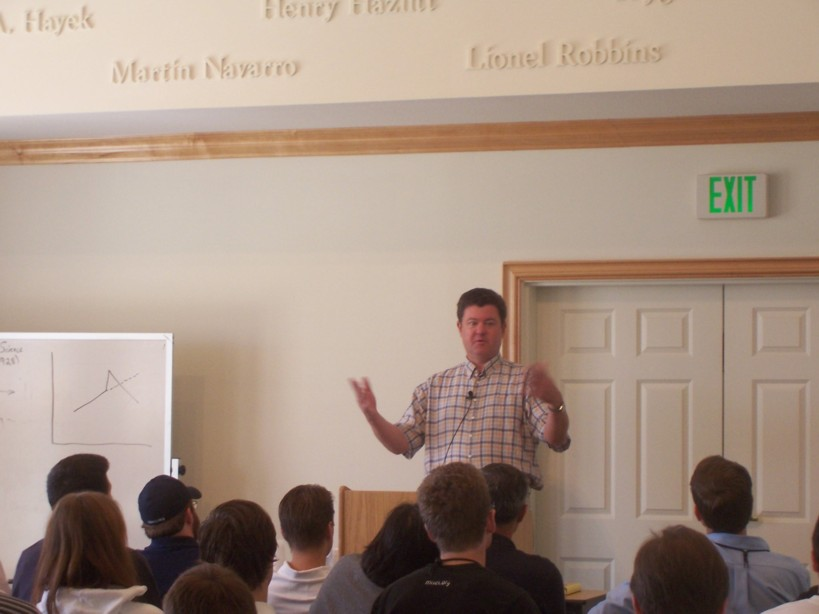
Thornton speaking about business cycles during the 2008 Mises University conference

Thornton grew up in Geneva, New York, in an Irish Catholic family of entrepreneurs who were "Democrat in politics".

Thornton received his Bachelor of Science degree from St. Bonaventure University (1982), and his Doctor of Philosophy degree from Auburn University (1989). Thornton taught economics at Auburn University. He formerly taught at Columbus State University where he was awarded the Faculty Research and Scholarship Award in 2002. He is now a Senior Fellow at the Ludwig von Mises Institute, where he is book review editor for its Quarterly Journal of Austrian Economics. As a writer for the Mises Institute, he is known for warning of a housing bubble in 2004. He has written about prohibition-related issues.

=== Prohibition studies ===
Thornton's first book, The Economics of Prohibition, was praised by Thornton's supervisor at the Mises Institute, its vice-president Murray Rothbard, who is quoted on the book cover of the 2007 edition as writing: "Thornton's book... arrives to fill an enormous gap, and it does so splendidly...This is an excellent work making an important contribution to scholarship as well as to the public policy debate." Reviewer David R. Henderson of the Hoover Institution wrote, "Thornton's book contains much valuable information on prohibition and cites many sources. But the economically literate book on prohibition that makes a case for legalization has yet to be written." Thornton debated the War on Drugs at Oxford Union in 2014.

Libertarian organizations have published Thornton's articles on drug and alcohol prohibition, and he was once interviewed on the topic of prohibition by Agence France-Presse. Thornton contributed a chapter to Jefferson Fish's book How to Legalize Drugs.

== Political activities ==
Thornton ran for US Congress in 1984. Thornton has been the vice chairman and chairman of the Libertarian Party of Alabama. In 1988, he became the first Libertarian Party office-holder in Alabama when he was elected Constable, a local law-enforcement position. He was the Libertarian Party's Candidate for the US Senate in 1996. He was also endorsed by the Reform Party, and came in third of four candidates.

== Books ==
- The Economics of Prohibition. Salt Lake City, Utah: University of Utah Press, 1991. (ISBN 0-87480-379-9)
- Tariffs, Blockades, and Inflation: The Economics of the Civil War (with Robert B. Ekelund, Jr). Delaware: Scholarly Resource Books, 2004. (ISBN 0-8420-2961-3)
- The Quotable Mises (editor). Auburn, AL: Ludwig von Mises Institute, 2005. (ISBN 0-945466-45-5)
- The Bastiat Collection (editor). Volume 1 and Volume 2. Auburn, AL: Ludwig von Mises Institute, 2007. (ISBN 978-1-933550-07-7)
- An Essay on Economic Theory: An English translation of Richard Cantillon’s Essai sur la Nature du Commerce en Général (Thornton, editor; Chantal Saucier, translator) Auburn, AL: Ludwig von Mises Institute, 2010. (ISBN 978-1-61016-001-8)

== See also ==
- List of Austrian-school economists
- List of Auburn University people
