= Robert Tollison =

American economist (1942–2016)

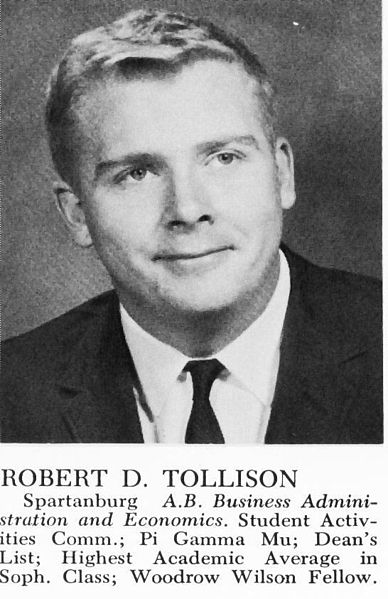
- 1964 yearbook photo
- Born: 1942; Spartanburg, South Carolina
- Died: October 24, 2016 (aged 73–74)

Academic work
- Discipline: Economics, Public Choice
- School or tradition: Public Choice school
- Website: Information at IDEAS / RePEc

Robert D. Tollison (1942–October 24, 2016) was an American economist who specialized in public choice theory.

== Education ==
A native of Spartanburg, South Carolina, Tollison attended local Wofford College where he earned an A.B. in business administration and economics in 1964. He completed an M.A. in economics at the University of Alabama a year later. After completing his master's in Tuscaloosa, Tollison moved to Virginia to begin teaching at Longwood University, then called "Longwood College." Shortly thereafter he commenced work on his Ph.D. in economics at the University of Virginia. He finished his doctoral degree in 1969.

== Professional life ==
Tollison's first academic position as a Ph.D. was at Cornell University, where he taught from 1969 until 1973. He then took a job at Texas A&M University where he became the economics department head after a little more than a year. He held this position with Texas A&M until 1977 when, after having spent a year as a visiting professor at the University of Miami's law school, he accepted a new post at Virginia Tech as professor in that school's economics department. Tollison left Virginia Tech in 1981 to work in various roles with the Federal Trade Commission until 1983.

After leaving the FTC, Tollison returned to academia, eventually teaching at Clemson University, George Mason University, the University of Mississippi, Arizona State University, and Florida State University. He was on the editorial boards for the Journal of Sports Economics, Constitutional Political Economy, and Public Choice. He was on the board of advisors for the Independent Institute.

At the time of his death, he was Professor of Economics and BB&T Senior Fellow at Clemson University in Clemson, South Carolina.

== Contributions ==
Tollison's areas of particular interest included the economics of religion, history of economic thought, sports economics, antitrust theory, and tobacco policy. His textbook with Robert Ekelund, Economics, went through seven editions.

=== Mercantilism ===
According to a Libertarian Forum review of Tollison and Ekelund's Mercantilism as a Rent Seeking Society, a study of the political economy of mercantilism,

...using public choice analysis, Ekelund and Tollison assert that English mercantilism declined because the rise of parliamentary power raised the lobbying costs for monopoly privileges. As parliament refused to delegate its newly won powers to anybody, any prospective monopolist had to secure majorities in the legislature as well as the acquiescence of the king.... [T]he authors stress the similarity between mercantilism and present-day economic regulation, despite the changes in the political system.

=== Economics of sports ===
Tollison's The National Collegiate Athletic Association: A Study in Cartel Behavior, in addition to a number of journal articles on the economics of sports, led to Tollison's work being frequently cited in the area of sports economics.

=== Economics of smoking ===
Robert Tollison came to the attention of the tobacco industry in 1977 when he co-authored an article: "Rational Choice and the Taxation of Sin", in the Journal of Public Economics, attacking the way governments imposed "their moral code upon consumers of goods that are thought to be undesirable." He was a professor of economics at Virginia Polytechnic at the time, and also the executive director of the Center for Study of Public Choice.

== Books ==
=== As author ===
- Balanced Budgets, Fiscal Responsibility, and the Constitution with Richard E. Wagner. San Francisco, CA: Cato Institute, 1980.
- Politicians, Legislation, and the Economy: An Inquiry into the Interest Group Theory of Government with R. McCormick. Boston, MA: Martinus Nijhoff, 1981.
- Mercantilism as a Rent Seeking Society with Robert Ekelund. College Station, TX: Texas A&M University Press, 1982.
- El Analisis Economico De Lo Politico with James M. Buchanan and R.E. McCormick. Madrid, Spain: Instituto de Estudios Economicos, 1984.
- Economics with R. Ekelund. Boston, MA: Little, Brown, 1986.
- Smoking and the State with R. Wagner. Lexington, MA: D.C. Heath, 1988.
- Concentration and Competition: The Economics of the Carbonated Soft Drink Industry with D. Kaplan and R. Higgins. Lexington, MA: D.C. Heath, 1990.
- The Economics of Smoking: Getting It Right with R. Wagner. Dordrecht, The Netherlands: Kluwer Academic Publishers, 1991.
- The National Collegiate Athletic Association: A Study in Cartel Behavior with A. Fleisher and B. Goff. Chicago, IL: University of Chicago Press, 1992.
- Sacred Trust: The Medieval Church as an Economic Firm with R. Ekelund, R. Hebert, G. Anderson, and A. Davis. London: Oxford University Press, 1996. ISBN 978-0195356038
- Politicized Economies: Monarchy, Monopolies, and Mercantilism with R. Ekelund. College Station, TX: Texas A&M Press, 1997.

=== Articles ===
- Tollison, Robert (2008). "Sportometrics". In David R. Henderson (ed.). Concise Encyclopedia of Economics (2nd ed.). Indianapolis: Library of Economics and Liberty. pp. 471–473. ISBN 978-0865976658. OCLC 237794267.

=== As editor ===
- Theory of Public Choice: Political Applications of Economics with James M. Buchanan. Ann Arbor, MI: University of Michigan Press, 1972.
- The Economic Approach to Public Policy: Selected Readings with R. Amacher and T. Willett. Ithaca, NY: Cornell University Press, 1976.
- What Should Economists Do? by James M. Buchanan; compiled and edited with Geoffrey Brennan. Indianapolis, IN: Liberty Press, 1979.
- The Political Economy of Antitrust Lexington, MA: D.C. Heath, 1980.
- Towards a Theory of the Rent Seeking Society with James M. Buchanan and Gordon Tullock. College Station, TX: Texas A&M University Press, 1980.
- Theory of Public Choice II with James M. Buchanan. Ann Arbor, MI: University of Michigan Press, 1984.
- Smoking and Society: Toward a Balanced Assessment Lexington, MA: D.C. Heath, 1986. (Japanese translation, 1987)
- Deficits with James M. Buchanan and Charles Rowley. Oxford, England: Basil Blackwell, 1987. (Japanese translation, 1990)
- Economics: Between Predictive Science and Moral Philosophy by James M. Buchanan; compiled and edited with V. Vanberg. College Station, TX: Texas A&M University Press, 1987.
- Clearing the Air: Perspectives on Environmental Tobacco Smoke Lexington, MA: D.C. Heath, 1988. (Spanish translation, 1989)
- The Political Economy of Rent Seeking with C. Rowley and G. Tullock. Boston, MA: Kluwer, 1988.
- Explorations into Constitutional Economics by James M. Buchanan; compiled and edited with V. Vanber. College Station, TX: Texas A&M University Press, 1989.
- Predicting Politics: Essays in Empirical Public Choice with M. Crain. Ann Arbor, MI: University of Michigan Press, 1990.
- Sportometrics with B. Goff. College Station, TX: Texas A&M University Press, 1990.
- The Next Twenty Five Years of Public Choice with C. Rowley and F. Schneider. Boston, MA: Kluwer, 1993.
- On the Trail of Homo Economicus by Gordon Tullock; compiled and edited with G. Brady. Fairfax, VA: George Mason University Press, 1994.
- The Economic Analysis of Rent Seeking with R. Congleton. London, England: Edward Elgar, 1995. (Japanese translation, 2002)
- The Collected Works of James M. Buchanan compiled and edited with G. Brennan and H. Kliemt. (20 volumes) Indianapolis, IN: Liberty Fund, 1999–2002.
- Method and Morals in Constitutional Economics: Essays in Honor of James M. Buchanan with G. Brennan and H. Kliemt. Berlin, Germany: Springer-Verlag, 2002.
- The Economics of Budget Deficits with W. Shughart and C. Rowley. (two volumes) London, England: Elgar, 2002.
