= Leonardo Auernheimer =

- Born: August 27, 1936; Argentina
- Died: 2010 (aged 73–74)
- Other name: Pepe
- Education: University of Buenos Aires (Undergraduate); University of Chicago (Ph.D. in Economics, 1973)
- Occupations: Economist, professor, international monetary consultant
- Known for: Research in monetary economics and open economy macroeconomics

Leonardo Auernheimer (August 27, 1936 – 2010) was an Argentine economist, professor, and international monetary consultant.

== Early life ==
Auernheimer was born in Argentina to Jose Ignacio Auernheimer and Maria Elena Savanti de Auernheimer. He graduated from the University of Buenos Aires and earned a Ph.D. in economics from the University of Chicago in 1973. Before completing his doctorate, he served as a visiting professor at the Universidade Federal de Viçosa in Brazil.

== Career ==
After obtaining his Ph.D., he joined the economics department at Texas A&M University, where he was a professor until his death in 2010. He was department head from 2002 to 2006.

While at Texas A&M he visited the World Bank and the International Monetary Fund as a visiting scholar, and was a visiting professor at ITAM, in Mexico City, the Université du centre d'études macroeconomiques d'Argentine, in Buenos Aires, and the University of Göttingen in Germany.

He was a member of the editorial board of the Journal of Applied Economics.

He consulted on macroeconomics policies for international organizations in several countries throughout Latin America and the Middle and Far East. He directed and served on dozens of dissertation committees for students around the world.

== Research ==
His research was in the area of monetary economics and open economy macroeconomics, particularly dynamic inconsistency and the fiscal theory of the price level. He published in the premier economic journals, including Journal of Political Economy, Econometrica, the American Economic Review, and the Journal of Monetary Economics. He was an associate editor of the Journal of Applied Economics and the Journal of Development Economics. He was a frequent consultant to the World Bank in the evaluation of macroeconomic programs in many Latin American countries, as well as in Mongolia, the Republic of Georgia and Lebanon.

== Books ==
- Leonardo Auernheimer, ed. (15 April 2010) [2003]. International Financial Markets: The Challenge of Globalization. University of Chicago Press. ISBN 978-0-226-03215-3.
- Essentials of Money and Banking, with Robert Ekelund, Jr., John Wiley and Sons Ltd., 1981.

== Select academic articles ==
- Auernheimer, Leonardo; George, Susan Mary (1997). "Shock Versus Gradualism in Models of Rational Expectations: The Case of Trade Liberalization". SSRN Electronic Journal. doi:10.2139/ssrn.882667. ISSN 1556-5068.
- "Policy design for rational-expectations models", Optimal Control, Expectations and Uncertainty, Cambridge University Press, 20 July 1989, pp. 148–168, doi:10.1017/cbo9780511521973.009, ISBN 978-0-521-26444-0
- Auernheimer, Leonardo (March 1987). "On the outcome of inconsistent programs under exchange rate and monetary rules". Journal of Monetary Economics. 19 (2): 279–305. doi:10.1016/0304-3932(87)90050-x. ISSN 0304-3932.
- Auernheimer, Leonardo (August 1983). "The Revenue-maximizing Inflation Rate and the Treatment of the Transition to Equilibrium". Journal of Money, Credit and Banking. 15 (3): 368–376. doi:10.2307/1992488. ISSN 0022-2879. JSTOR 1992488.
- Auernheimer, Leonardo; Saving, Thomas R. (January 1977). "Market Organization and the Durability of Durable Goods". Econometrica. 45 (1): 219. doi:10.2307/1913298. ISSN 0012-9682. JSTOR 1913298.
- Auernheimer, Leonardo (May 1974). "The Honest Government's Guide to the Revenue from the Creation of Money". Journal of Political Economy. 82 (3): 598–606. doi:10.1086/260216. ISSN 0022-3808.
