= Ramogi Huma =

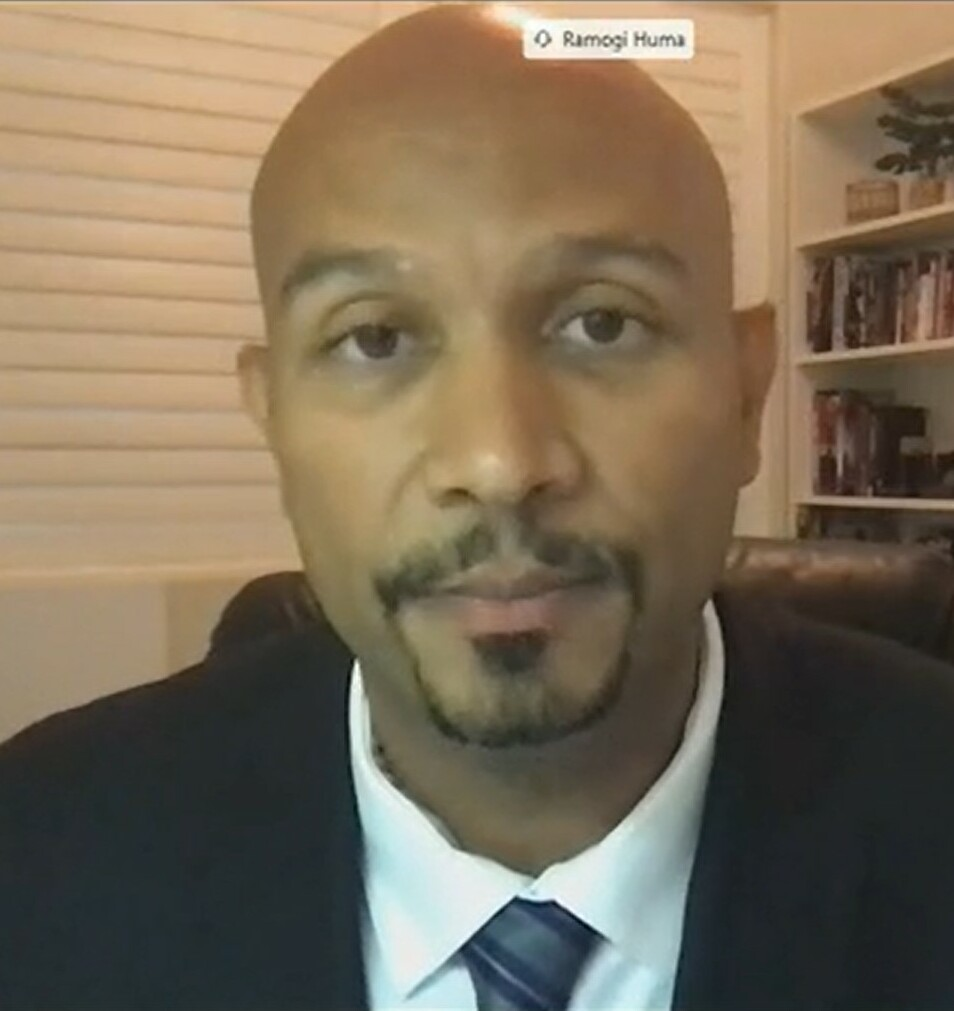
- Huma in 2020
- Education: University of California, Los Angeles
- Occupation: Executive Director of the National College Players Association (NCPA)

Ramogi Huma is the executive director of the National College Players Association (NCPA), a 501c3 nonprofit advocacy group launched by UCLA football players.

== Career ==
Huma became an advocate for college athletes' rights while playing football for UCLA when he founded a student group to give college athletes the means to voice their concerns and secure basic protections in NCAA sports. He started the organization after witnessing the NCAA suspend his All American teammate for eating groceries that were left anonymously on his doorstep when he had no food, and after being informed that the NCAA prevented colleges from paying for medical expenses for injuries that occurred during summer workouts.

The student group evolved into The National College Players Association (NCPA), a nonprofit advocacy group composed of players across the nation. Huma serves as the NCPA's Executive Director.

NCPA members have fought for college athletes' rights by speaking out in the media, during hearings held by lawmakers, in lawsuits, by petitioning college presidents, and during televised football games by wearing “APU” on their gear as a part of the NCPA's “All Players United” campaign. The NCPA has won a number of victories including the elimination of the NCAA's cap on player medical expenses, a $10 million fund for degree completion, and key safety rules to help prevent workout related deaths.

Huma has testified in support of college athletes' rights in US congressional hearings and briefings, state legislatures, and in front of the Boston City Council. The NCPA has successfully sponsored state laws such as The Student-Athletes Bill of Rights in California. The law requires colleges to pay for their athletes' sports-related medical expenses, prohibits them from taking scholarships away from athletes permanently injured in their sport, and requires them to extend scholarships up to one year for former players whose teams have low graduation rates. A version of this California law was introduced in Congress in November 2013. Huma has also served as a consultant in athletes' rights lawsuits including White v. NCAA, O'Bannon v. NCAA, and Jenkins v. NCAA.

Huma has co-authored several studies with Drexel University Sport Management professor Ellen Staurowsky including “The $6 Billion Heist: Robbing College Athletes Under the Guise of Amateurism”. The study estimates that the fair market value of FBS football and men's basketball players is approximately $137k and $289k, respectively; and that the NCAA will deny these athletes approximately $6 billion of their fair market value between 2011 and 2015.

On January 28, 2014, Huma announced the formation of The College Athletes Players Association (CAPA), the first college athletes' union, which he co-founded with former Northwestern quarterback Kain Colter and former UMASS basketball player Luke Bonner. Huma serves as CAPA's president. With the support of the United Steelworkers Union and under Colter's leadership, Northwestern football players asserted their rights under labor laws by signing CAPA union cards. The NLRB Regional Director, Peter Sung Ohr, ruled in favor of CAPA and the Northwestern football players. Ohr stated that college athletes are employees with the right to unionize; although this decision was overturned in 2015 by the national office of the NLRB.

Huma's activities concerning college athletes' rights have been covered by numerous media outlets including ESPN, Fox Sports, CNN, MSNBC, Fox News, CBS, ABC, NBC, 60 Minutes, Sports Illustrated, The Wall Street Journal, USA Today, and NPR. Huma's football team won back-to-back Pac-10 championships while he earned a bachelor's degree in sociology and a master of public health (MPH) degree at UCLA.

Huma was named one of sports' 50 most influential people in 2006/2007 by ArmchairGM.

Huma was named the 13th College Football's "25 Most Intriguing People in Suits" in 2014 by Yahoo! Sports.

Huma was included in Time magazine's "12 New Faces of Black Leadership" in 2015. TIME
