= John R. Thelin =

American scholar of higher education

John R. Thelin is an American professor of higher education and public policy in the United States. He taught at the University of Kentucky starting in 1996. He is currently a professor emeritus.

== Early life and awards ==
Thelin received his bachelor's in history from Brown University and his master's and PhD from the University of California, Berkeley. While at Brown University, he was on the varsity wrestling team. In 2011, he was given the Outstanding Research Achievement Award from the Association for the Study of Higher Education (ASHE). He served as the president of ASHE from 1999 to 2000. In 2023, Thelin was honored with the University of Kentucky Libraries Medallion for Intellectual Achievement. He is a member of Phi Beta Kappa, a prestigious honor society.

== Works ==
- A History of American Higher Education
- Going to College in the Sixties
