= Kenneth Shropshire =

Emeritus Professor American author, executive advisor, consultant and attorney

Kenneth L. Shropshire
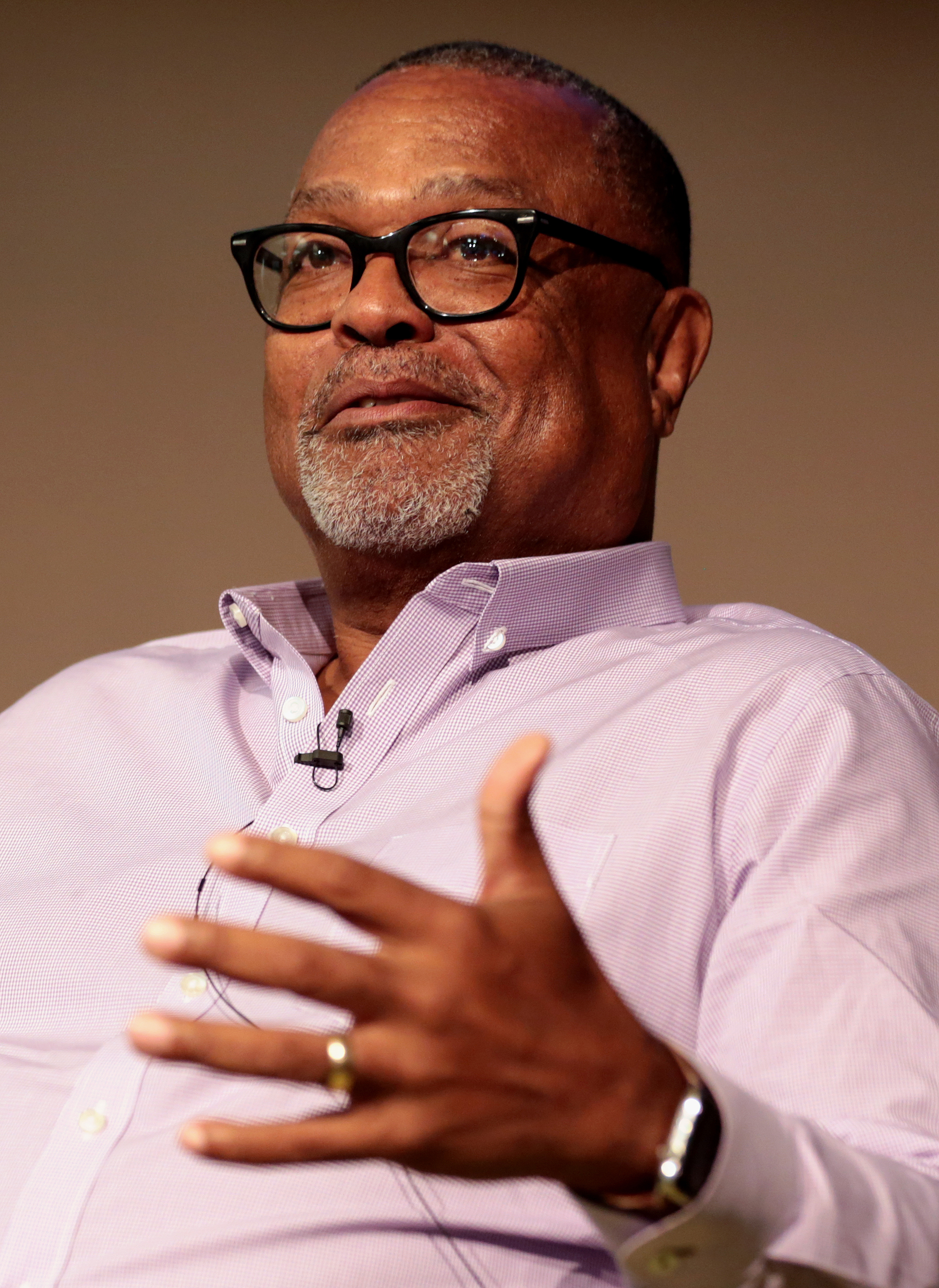
- Shropshire in 2017
- Born: Kenneth L. Shropshire; February 27, 1955 (age 71)
- Occupations: Author, attorney, consultant, educator
- Website: www.kennethshropshire.com

Kenneth L. Shropshire (born February 27, 1955) is an American academic and attorney. He is the former CEO of the Global Sport Institute and Adidas Distinguished Professor of Global Sport at Arizona State University (2017-2022).

== Career ==
Shropshire took up a post at the Wharton School of the University of Pennsylvania in 1986. He was the David W. Hauck Professor and the director of the Wharton Sports Business Initiative. For five years he was chair of the department of legal studies and business ethics. He left Wharton in 2017 to launch the Global Sport Institute at Arizona State University as its founding CEO. He returned to Wharton in 2022. In February 2026, Shropshire was named a strategic advisor at SeventySix Capital. He specializes in sports business and law, sports and social impact, and negotiations. He is a past president of the Sports Lawyers Association. He is the lead director at Moelis & Company.

When the National Football League sought to revive its career symposium, Shropshire assisted them in hosting the event at Wharton. This after leading the Business Management and Entrepreneurial Program for NFL players at Wharton since 2004.

== Books ==
- Agents of Opportunity: Sports Agents and Corruption in Collegiate Sports (University of Pennsylvania Press, 1990)
- The Sports Franchise Game: Cities in Pursuit of Sports Franchises, Events (University of Pennsylvania Press, 1995)
- In Black and White: Race and Sports in America (New York University Press, 1996)
- Being Sugar Ray: The Life of Sugar Ray Robinson, America's Greatest Boxer and the First Celebrity Athlete (Basic Books, 2009)
- Sport Matters: Leadership, Power, and the Quest for Respect in Sports (University of Pennsylvania Press, 2015)
- The Business of Sports Agents (with Timothy Davis and N. Jeremi Duru, University of Pennsylvania Press, 2003, 2nd ed., 2008, 3rd ed., 2016)
- The Miseducation of the Student Athlete: How to Fix College Sports (with Collin D. Williams, University of Pennsylvania Press, 2017)

His edited volumes include:

- The Business of Sports (edited with Scott Rosner, 2nd ed., Jones & Bartlett, 2011)
- Basketball Jones: America Above the Rim (edited with Todd Boyd, New York University Press, 2000)
